= List of The Rookie episodes =

The Rookie is an American drama series created by Alexi Hawley for ABC. The series follows John Nolan, a man in his forties, who becomes the oldest rookie at the Los Angeles Police Department. The series is produced by 20th Television and Lionsgate Television; it is based on real-life Los Angeles Police Department officer William Norcross, who moved to Los Angeles in 2015 and joined the department in his mid-40s.

The Rookie's first season premiered on October 16, 2018. On May 10, 2019, the series was renewed for a second season which premiered on September 29, 2019. On May 21, 2020, the series was renewed for a third season which premiered on January 3, 2021. The series premiere was delayed due to the COVID-19 pandemic. The pandemic also caused the series season to be shortened to 14 episodes. On May 14, 2021, the series was renewed for a fourth season which premiered on September 26, 2021. On March 30, 2022, ABC renewed the series for a fifth season which premiered on September 25, 2022. On April 17, 2023, ABC renewed the series for a sixth season which premiered on February 20, 2024. The season premiere was delayed due to the 2023 Writers Guild of America strike, which also caused the season to be shortened to 10 episodes. On April 15, 2024, ABC renewed the series for a seventh season. It premiered on January 7, 2025. In April 2025, the series was renewed for an eighth season, which premiered on January 6, 2026. On April 13, 2026 ABC renewed the series for a ninth season.

As of May 4, 2026, 144 episodes of The Rookie have aired, concluding the eighth season.

== Series overview ==
Season	Episodes	Originally released	
Season	Episodes	First released	Last released
1	20	October 16, 2018	April 16, 2019
2	20	September 29, 2019	May 10, 2020
3	14	January 3, 2021	May 16, 2021
4	22	September 26, 2021	May 15, 2022
5	22	September 25, 2022	May 2, 2023
6	10	February 20, 2024	May 21, 2024
7	18	January 7, 2025	May 13, 2025
8	18	January 6, 2026	May 4, 2026

== Episodes ==
=== Season 1 (2018–19) ===
No. overall	No. in season	Title	Directed by	Written by	Original release date	Prod. code	U.S. viewers (millions)
1	1	"Pilot"	Liz Friedlander	Alexi Hawley	October 16, 2018	101	5.43
Nine months after foiling a bank robbery in Foxburg, Pennsylvania, John Nolan, a 45-year-old divorcé, moves to Los Angeles and becomes a police officer. His assignment to the Mid-Wilshire Division of the LAPD is met with skepticism, particularly his watch commander, Sergeant Wade Grey. Nolan and his fellow rookie officers, Jackson West and Lucy Chen, are assigned to Training Officers (TO) Talia Bishop, Angela Lopez, and Tim Bradford, respectively. Jackson is son of a high-ranking LAPD Internal Affairs officer and eager to live up to the family legacy. Lucy, who became a cop against the wishes of her therapist parents, is carrying on a secret affair with Nolan despite the risk it poses to her career. Sergeant Grey tells Nolan that he will do everything in his power to discourage Nolan from continuing, as he fears Nolan's inexperience and age will endanger his officers. When Nolan replies that he believes being a cop might be his calling, Grey says then nothing he puts Nolan through will deter him.
2	2	"Crash Course"	Adam Davidson	Alexi Hawley	October 23, 2018	102	4.54
Nolan continues to face difficulties in navigating between his civilian instincts and how they affect his actions as a cop. Jackson is questioned as to why he didn't fire his weapon in a previous call, but Lopez covers for him then forces him to handle the arrest of a man on PCP, which he pulls off. Lucy is stuck with a lazy new training officer while Tim recovers from a gunshot wound, and winds up arresting a man for shoplifting. A kidnapping victim is rescued; while apprehending him, Talia stops Nolan from beating the suspect in a rage. Captain Zoe Andersen reminds him that it is not his job to punish criminals. Lucy finds out that Tim intentionally got her assigned to a poor officer to test her commitment.
3	3	"The Good, the Bad and the Ugly"	Greg Beeman	Liz Alper & Ally Seibert	October 30, 2018	103	4.53
Nolan and Talia chase a group of thieves and Nolan loses a bag of stolen money when a street performer runs off with it. The precinct learns that the thieves are part of a gang who have pulled off a string of heists and they begin searching for the remaining gang members. Meanwhile, Lucy helps Tim as he readjusts to being back on duty while also trying to help his drug addicted wife Isabel, who reveals to Lucy she was once a narcotics cop. Elsewhere, an arrest of a former college athlete causes Jackson and Lopez to talk about alternative careers to police work since Lopez still doubts Jackson's ability to handle the job.
4	4	"The Switch"	Toa Fraser	Vincent Angell	November 13, 2018	104	4.01
Sgt. Grey tests the rookies by assigning them new TOs, partnering Nolan with Lopez, Jackson with Tim, and Lucy with Talia. He tasks the rookies with gaining insight into their new TOs. Lopez takes Nolan to court and Nolan ends up chasing an escaped prisoner, leading to a potentially career-making bust for the pair. Tim, however, learns about Jackson's struggles when he freezes during a shootout and enraged, confronts Lopez over it. Tim later takes Jackson to meet an agoraphobe who gives Jackson advice on facing his fears. Meanwhile, Lucy defends her relationship with Nolan to Talia during their patrol, prompting Nolan and Lucy to have a talk about their relationship.
5	5	"The Roundup"	Nelson McCormick	Elizabeth Davis Beall	November 20, 2018	106	4.10
Nolan struggles to deal with his breakup with Lucy just as the TOs start an annual competition to see who can get the most arrests in a single shift. Tim plays to win, even bribing a dispatcher to get the best calls, which worries Lucy. Meanwhile, Jackson dives headfirst into the competition to prove himself while Nolan and Talia, who is refusing to play, find themselves dealing with a mob-connected banker.
6	6	"The Hawke"	Timothy Busfield	Fredrick Kotto	November 27, 2018	105	4.38
Upon learning that his former academy instructor, Jeremy Hawke, has fallen on hard times, Nolan offers to help him out. Jeremy politely declines but, the next morning, Lopez and Jackson answer a call from Jeremy's estranged wife. She claims Jeremy has become unstable and dangerous. Nolan and Talia get involved in the pursuit of Jeremy, which quickly escalates. Then, they discover Jeremy has his son with him, who is willingly participating with his father's fugitive activities. Meanwhile, Jackson and Lopez deal with a shooting victim and his father, both of whom they suspect aren't telling them the whole truth and Tim tries to teach Lucy to anticipate the behavior of criminals.
7	7	"The Ride Along"	Cherie Nowlan	Robert Bella	December 4, 2018	107	4.20
Nolan and Talia are assigned Hollywood director Rupert Payne, of whom Nolan is a fan, for a ride along to research his new film. Despite orders to keep him away from any dangerous situations, Rupert observes Nolan and Talia deescalate a situation involving a mentally impaired young man from a troubled neighborhood, which leads to a dangerous situation when Rupert tries to help the young man's family. Meanwhile, Jackson informs Lopez that she is being considered for detective, which prompts Lopez to attempt leveraging smaller criminals into giving up a major player, which ultimately backfires. Elsewhere, Tim's wife Isabel is arrested in a drug bust, forcing Tim to choose, once and for all, between his devotion to Isabel and his duty as a cop.
8	8	"Time of Death"	Mike Goi	Brynn Malone	December 11, 2018	108	4.27
While in pursuit of a robber, Nolan fatally shoots him in self defense. The episode centers on the processing of this event. Tim's wife Isabel is returning to be a CI. While trying to get evidence against a major drug trafficker, the connection to her wire is lost and Talia and Tim find the camera and blood upon searching the apartment. Isabel seems to have been taken by the drug traffickers. Lucy gives Nolan a ride home from the precinct and they sleep together. While Lucy is in the shower, the brother of the robber attacks Nolan. The episode ends with Nolan's attacker holding a gun on Nolan and a shot fired off camera.
9	9	"Standoff"	John Terlesky	Alexi Hawley	January 8, 2019	109	3.95
Nolan manages to fight off his attacker and calls for backup; he is assigned to desk duty during the investigation of his attack. Tim, Lopez, and Talia find Isabel, who has been shot in the head but will survive. Tim, Lucy, Jackson, Lopez, Talia, and Detectives Wolfe and Vestri hunt down Vance, the drug dealer who shot Isabel and left her for dead, and end up in a shootout with Vance and his men. The other officers, including Nolan, Commander Percy West, and the SWAT team arrive and arrest Vance and his men. Nolan lies about his affair with Lucy to Percy, who later informs Nolan that he has been cleared of all charges and can return to the police force immediately.
10	10	"Flesh and Blood"	Jessica Yu	Inda Craig-Galvan	January 15, 2019	110	3.83
Henry Nolan comes to visit his dad, who is surprised to learn that Jackson and Lucy already know Henry through social media. At morning roll call, Andersen announces she will ride along with Lucy, while Grey will partner with Nolan, and Tim and Talia will partner with each other. Grey's daughter Dominique also shows up unexpectedly for an internship. Henry and Dominique bond over their concern over their dads' work, and Tim and Talia clash over procedure, as each is used to being the boss of their rookie. The episode ends with Nolan and his son talking about Nolan's job. Henry worries about the danger he is in. Nolan agrees to text his son at the end of each day with a code word to let him know he is okay.
11	11	"Redwood"	Sylvain White	Ally Seibert & Liz Alper	January 22, 2019	111	3.84
The officers are forced to come in to work on their day off, as the Vice President has made an unexpected visit to Los Angeles. While breaking up a fight between two homeless women, Lucy gets pricked by a used needle and has to be tested to see if she was exposed to various diseases; Tim tries to comfort. Lopez and Jackson try to break up protestors and tell people who have obscene banners to take them down. Nolan and Talia engage in a shootout with several robbery suspects; when Lopez and Jackson defy Agent Danvers' orders and go help Talia and Nolan, Grey defends them, saying it was the right thing to do. Lucy gets good news about her test results. Jackson tells Lucy about his family problems. Nolan sells his house in Pennsylvania.
12	12	"Heartbreak"	Carol Banker	Vincent Angell	February 12, 2019	113	3.64
The evening before Valentine's Day, the rookies have dinner at the same location as Grey and his wife Luna. Nolan steps in when a man harasses a woman at the bar, causing a commotion that ruins Grey's evening. On Valentine's Day, Tim takes a day off to meet up with Isabel, who is in rehab, and ends their relationship, telling Isabel that she'll never move past who she was as an addict if they remain together. After having her life saved by Nolan, a recently widowed woman tries everything to get together with Nolan, even cozying up to Ben. Lopez and Jackson interrogate an alleged victim who claims to suffer from dementia, but turns out to be a dangerous criminal. Jackson hits it off with a male nurse. Lopez searches her boyfriend Wesley Evers' smartphone, assuming he cheats on her, but it turns out to be different than what she had thought. Nolan arranges a party for his first Valentine's Day as a single person in a long time and is surprised when Talia attends.
13	13	"Caught Stealing"	Omar Madha	David Radcliff	February 19, 2019	112	3.54
Responding to a car accident, Talia and Nolan find a stabbing victim who flees the scene before turning up at the station, claiming to be an undercover LAPD officer investigating a drug cartel that plans to transfer one million dollars that night. When the LAPD raids the home and stops the transfer, the rookies are left to guard the money until the counters arrive. The next morning, the rookies are informed that $250,000 is missing; the rookies are interrogated before being cleared. Lucy is ambushed by the cartel while driving; Nolan and Jackson rush to her aid. Meanwhile, the cartel boss catches up to Lucy and demands to know where she hid the stolen money. Lucy recognizes his boots as belonging to a man she saw leaving the house before the raid with a large duffel bag, and accuses the boss of stealing the money himself. The boss shoots his men and scuffles with Lucy before she and Nolan subdue him. Andersen visits the officer in the hospital and arrests him for having tipped off the boss. To avoid possible issues from taking financial advantage of his job, Nolan agrees to pay Ben what he can for his apartment.
14	14	"Plain Clothes Day"	Mike Goi	Terence Paul Winter	February 26, 2019	114	3.89
The rookies undergo Plain Clothes Day, where their TOs ride along out of uniform and do not assist in any capacity. Jackson is eager to break his father's records but gets stuck working behind a desk after their patrol car breaks down before departing; he eventually overcomes his frustrations and helps the widow of murder victim Richard Ocheda by returning her husband's watch to her. After responding to a noise complaint about a dog, the dog owner files a complaint about Lucy for threatening him; she later redeems herself by arresting the dog owner for murdering the woman who filed the noise complaint. While stopped at a hotel, Nolan dismissed a distressed woman with questions about credit card tracking, only to later find her to be a kidnapping victim of her abusive and violent husband. Talia decides to assist Nolan, while he distracts the husband, eventually arresting the husband and freeing the woman.
15	15	"Manhunt"	Bill Johnson	Robert Bella	March 5, 2019	115	4.51
A prisoner transport crashes while on the road and several violent criminals are on the loose in suburban Los Angeles. After tending the wounds of wounded deputy, Nolan is attacked by one of the prisoners, but quickly subdues him before Lopez and Jackson arrive. Tim and Lucy capture another prisoner on the loose in a neighborhood, and also clash with a local militia. Jackson and Lopez capture Oscar Hutchison in a parking garage. At the station, Oscar makes subtle hints that Jackson's father Percy was corrupt earlier in his career, which Jackson subsequently dismisses. Nolan and Talia inspect vehicles going into a neighborhood, and Nolan discovers one vehicle where the driver seems distressed. One of the prisoners is revealed to be hiding in the vehicle's trunk holding the driver's daughter hostage. Nolan chooses to let the driver go and, when he arrives home and pulls into the garage, the police are waiting and prisoner is arrested. Tim and Lucy, along with Tim's informant Deacon, find the last prisoner, Marcos Gibson, and protects him from angry members of the 5–4 gang, until backup arrives. Nolan single handedly tackles a hostage situation with Caleb Jost, the second last prisoner, based on advice from Jessica Russo. Tim also decides to start taking his sergeant exams.
16	16	"Greenlight"	Valerie Weiss	Brynn Malone	March 19, 2019	116	4.24
Internal Affairs is conducting random integrity tests at the precinct to ensure officers are following procedure. Nolan arrests an unruly woman and her dress's shoulder strap accidentally breaks, embarrassing her. After a gunman attempts to kill Nolan that evening, Nolan learns a hit has been put on his life by the unruly woman's boyfriend Cole Midas, whose father Leonard is the leader of a violent white supremacist gang, the Southern Front. After some soul-searching, Nolan returns to work the next morning and is partnered with Captain Andersen. Officers seize millions of the gang's assets as leverage to get Leonard to call off the hit, which works. However, Cole and his men capture Nolan and Andersen. Although Andersen frees herself and saves Nolan, she is fatally shot by a fleeing Cole. Nolan sits with Andersen's corpse as Tim, Talia, Lucy, Lopez, Jackson, and the other LAPD members arrive. The officers salute Andersen. Later, Grey revisits Leonard and demands he hand over his son. At the end, an ambush is set, and Cole is arrested by Nolan.
17	17	"The Shake Up"	Steve Robin	Alexi Hawley	March 26, 2019	117	4.24
Jessica arranges for Nolan, accompanied by Tim, to be put on a protective detail for a former border patrol guard who became a human trafficker. Grey struggles with the orders issued by the new captain, while Jackson deals with relationship issues. Lucy and Talia save a young man from a brutal exorcism performed by his mother, but Lucy confronts her father, a therapist whose arm was broken by a patient. She is forced to arrest him, causing disappointment from her father. However, she redeems herself by having the patient transferred to the help he needs. An earthquake then rocks the city, leaving Grey to try to coordinate the city's response while Nolan and Tim are attacked at the safehouse. It turns out that their human trafficker had a GPS tracker on him, which led the cartel to the safehouse and subsequently the beach which Nolan and Tim brought him to.
18	18	"Homefront"	April Mullen	Bill Rinier & Natalie Callaghan	April 2, 2019	118	3.91
Nolan comes under fire after a man claims Nolan used excessive force and inflicted an injury, and he is assigned to the youngest lawyer, Simon Parks Jr. (Robbie Kay), available for his case. A detective is also investigated and arrested by Internal Affairs. This causes three criminals to be released from prison early. Lopez and Jackson take the case of Samantha Bennett, while Tim and Lucy check in on Max Kegel, and Nolan and Talia investigate Terry Wright. Terry recognizes Talia, as his associate Dylan Scott is Talia's former foster brother. Dylan and Terry later kidnap Talia after she tries to arrest them, leading to Nolan leaving his court hearing early. Dylan kills Terry after Terry attempts to kill Talia, and Talia admits to Grey that she lied about Dylan being her foster brother when applying to the academy. Jackson also confronts his father Percy about the latter being a dirty cop, which strains their relationship when Jackson learns that is not true.
19	19	"The Checklist"	John Fortenberry	Elizabeth Davis Beall & Fredrick Kotto	April 9, 2019	119	3.63
A few days before the rookies' final exam, Tim and Lopez reveal that Lucy and Jackson still have seven and three types of crime to witness, respectively, and must do so in the next 48 hours. Since Nolan has no outstanding crimes, he is assigned to desk duty while Talia goes before Internal Affairs, but he asks to work with Wolfe instead. While on the streets, Lucy and Jackson come across Ben, who was the latest victim of a car theft ring. Nolan ends up helping to catch the thieves, and tries to plead Talia's case in front of Internal Affairs. The episode ends with Talia being offered an opportunity to become a mole for IA, and Nolan telling Ben both about the trauma he suffered after the bank robbery seen in the Pilot episode, and how he got over it.
20	20	"Free Fall"	Mike Goi	Alexi Hawley	April 16, 2019	120	4.06
On the day of an important rookie exam, an isolated terrorist cell plot to use a weaponized virus threatens to derail the rookies' advancement as well as put strain on Nolan's personal relationships. While responding to the threat, Tim may be infected with the virus, while Jessica shoots a surrendering terrorist, straining her relationship with Nolan. Meanwhile, Lopez and Jackson also save several people on a bus by apprehending a second terrorist, which allows Jackson to make amends with his father regarding their previous argument. Once the virus has been contained, Tim is given a dose of the experimental vaccine, but then collapses after leaving the house.

=== Season 2 (2019–20) ===
No. overall	No. in season	Title	Directed by	Written by	Original release date	Prod. code	U.S. viewers (millions)
21	1	"Impact"	Mike Goi	Alexi Hawley	September 29, 2019	201	4.11
Tim's collapse was due to an allergic reaction to the experimental vaccine, and he recovers in time to take out a third terrorist from the previous attack with Nolan. Talia resigned from the LAPD and has joined the ATF. Nolan has moved into a new home that he's renovating. The rookies learn the scores of their six-month exams: Nolan 97, Lucy 91, and Jackson 81. While all three pass, allowing them to wear short sleeves instead of long sleeves, Tim forces Lucy to continue wearing long sleeves. After getting the lowest score rattles Jackson, causing him to act out, Grey demotes him, stating Jackson cannot wear short sleeves until Grey can trust him again. After Nolan and Grey interrupt a robbery at a police store, the team learns of a plan involving fake police officers. They arrest the imposters following a shootout.
22	2	"The Night General"	Rob Bowman	Fredrick Kotto	October 6, 2019	202	3.83
Jackson arrests his landlord for dealing drugs, but he is forced to move as his building has been declared a "house of ill repute". Nolan is assigned as partner to new detective Nick Armstrong and their investigation into a recent murder leads to an unexpected reunion with Nolan's old love interest Grace. Lucy is also still upset at Tim because he will not allow her to wear short sleeves even though she passed the midterm exam. Meanwhile, the father of the murder victim kills one of the men who murdered his son, and nearly kills the other suspect as well by placing him in a concrete mold, before Nolan and Armstrong manage to save him. However, the father commits suicide by hanging himself from a metal cable in a warehouse despite Nolan's attempts to persuade him not to. Jackson attempts to move into Smitty's trailer park as he doesn't have a place to live. However, Lucy learns of his predicament, and she allows him to move into her apartment.
23	3	"The Bet"	Barbara Brown	Corey Miller	October 13, 2019	203	3.60
Nolan tries to navigate his relationship with Jessica and he builds a rapport with Grace while investigating a criminal case involving a homeland security agent with Lopez. Jackson is assigned to Officer Smitty for the day and he struggles to deal with the laid-back and lazy Smitty. Later, a criminal that Jackson is patting down escapes and the criminal drops his gun in a nearby yard. A young boy, believing that the gun is a toy, picks it up and accidentally shoots his mother fatally, infuriating Jackson. They are later able to capture the criminal following a search after learning that the gun was used in another murder as well. Lucy also sets up Tim on a date with Rachel Hall, a social services agent and a friend of Lucy's from college, as part of a bet. Lucy later discovers that Tim and Rachel are now dating, meaning that she has won the bet and can go back to wearing short sleeves.
24	4	"Warriors and Guardians"	Lisa Demaine	Brynn Malone	October 20, 2019	204	3.76
Nolan gets a new training officer, Nyla Harper, a former undercover detective. They pull over a car with no plates and one of the occupants flees, later falling from a roof top. Nolan suspects foul play but Harper's body cam shows he jumped himself. While on patrol, they encounter Ross Teagan, a known drug dealer from Harper's past. An operation is commenced to set up Ross, but another suspect, Osito, is spotted leaving the scene. Together with Tim and Lucy, Nolan and Harper arrest Osito. Grey has Harper apologize to Nolan for her treatment of him, which he accepts. Tim struggles to find a birthday gift for Rachel, and reluctantly accepts help from Lucy. Jackson and Lopez apprehend two boys who harassed a homeless woman, Alice Sheldon, who turns out to be responsible for a hit and run ten years ago that left the victim paralyzed and eventually caused Alice to suffer a breakdown. Despite initially being against Lopez's defence of Alice, the victim, Karin Arnoux, later decides to speak to the DA on Alice's behalf.
25	5	"Tough Love"	Rachel Feldman	Vincent Angell	October 27, 2019	205	3.24
Lucy's mother comes to stay with her after having an argument with Lucy's father, frustrating Lucy. Nolan deals with surprising news that his son Henry is now engaged with his girlfriend, Abigail. The rookies recruit their first confidential informants. Nolan's first informant is Bianca, a drug dealer who overdoses afterwards helping Nolan. Nolan's second informant is a forger, who turns out to be helping women on the run from the cartel. Tim and Lucy deal with a young woman who is selling her stepmother's belongings to a pawn shop out of revenge for her cruel treatment of her. Lopez and Jackson successfully flip a known FBI informant, leaving the FBI handler furious and impressing Grey, who allows Jackson to finally wear short sleeves. Nolan learns that Abigail committed arson in the past, and he brings it up to Henry and her. Abigail explains the truth about her arson, after which Nolan apologizes to her.
26	6	"Fallout"	Bill Johnson	Robert Bella	November 3, 2019	206	3.50
The officers deal with an impending missile attack and also deal with their own disasters. Nolan attends a probationary court hearing, and he, Jessica, and Wesley help calm people down during the threat. They all hide in a fallout shelter, and Nolan and Jessica help subdue two prisoners that attempt to escape. Harper picks up her daughter from school, and has Rachel watch her at the station. Tim and Lucy also help a store owner deal with looters while Lopez and Jackson help save several people who are preparing to jump off of a building. Harper's ex-husband Donovan is furious at her for picking up their daughter and wants her arrested, but Nolan helps convince him that she has changed for the better. Wesley is also stabbed by one of the prisoners, Oscar Hutchinson, during the escape attempt and is hospitalized, but he survives his injuries.
27	7	"Safety"	Sylvain White	Terence Paul Winter	November 10, 2019	207	3.73
The relationship between Nolan and Jessica gets a lot more complicated after she delivers news that she might be pregnant. Nolan also assists Grace at the hospital at a meeting for expectant mothers, where he helps to subdue the unruly boyfriend of one of the women. Lopez is on temporary leave from the force following Wesley's stabbing, and she takes a job in private security escorting a high profile businessman. Officers Tim and Jackson also help out the Watts Rams as volunteer coaches, and they help rescue the mother of one of the team's star players from several armed kidnappers. Lucy and Harper are also assigned to one another, and have several disagreements before they work together to subdue a serial bomber. Nolan and Jessica break up after Jessica asks him to have kids as Nolan isn't ready to have more kids of his own.
28	8	"Clean Cut"	Toa Fraser	Mary Trahan	November 17, 2019	208	3.61
Nolan kicks off his birthday by babysitting a crime scene at a law office. He meets Ellroy Basso, a professional cleaner, and they have to evade two criminals when they return to the scene looking for a hidden stash of money. Meanwhile, Tim is involved in an accident when he rear-ends a woman while on patrol. Jackson is also exposed to a substance during a traffic stop and begins to act like he is on drugs. Sgt. Grey also rides patrol with Officer Harper after she requests an early annual evaluation to better her chances of getting custody of her daughter, and Grey observes her compassion in dealing with a near-drunk driver who was depressed after a cancer diagnosis. In the end, it is revealed the boyfriend of the woman Tim hit is intentionally scamming people to earn money by disconnecting the brake lights on the woman's car. Tim and Lucy also thwart a potential murder that the woman's boyfriend is trying to commit. Jackson is evaluated at the hospital but his exposure to the substance is not as serious as initially feared, allowing both Tim and Jackson to receive a special award from the deputy chief.
29	9	"Breaking Point"	Leslie Libman	Alexi Hawley & Corey Miller	December 1, 2019	209	3.36
Nolan's trust is tested when he tries to help the previous owner of his home reconnect with his family. Nolan later has to subdue and arrest him when the other man breaks into the house in the middle of the night. Meanwhile, Officer Harper has finally earned an overnight visit with her daughter that is put into jeopardy when her past undercover life resurfaces again. Nolan also has to go undercover in order to save Harper's life. Tim and Lucy deal with a murder when a lost dog is found covered with blood, resulting in a disturbing case where a woman was killed by her own son because she broke up with her boyfriend. Wesley is brought in as the kid's lawyer, but struggles with PTSD from when he was stabbed after the boy brings up the knife. Lopez and Jackson assist the stars of a police drama by showing them proper LAPD procedure after running into the lead actor during an arrest, with Jackson hitting it off with the actor while Lopez assists his co-star in dealing with a stalker, learning that the stalker is one of the production crew who shoots Jackson before she is subdued.
30	10	"The Dark Side"	Bill Roe	Alexi Hawley	December 8, 2019	210	3.70
The department is tasked with assisting convicted serial killer Rosalind Dyer (Annie Wersching) to find the remains of 3 of her victims in exchange for commuting her death sentence to life in prison. While on the way to her gravesites, the team is forced to stop a man from killing her, and they discover new bodies in Rosalind's gravesites. Nolan talks to Rosalind about the possibility of there being a third victim, as two bodies were found along with Rosalind's original kills, having been killed by a different serial killer. Rosalind refuses to help them, and the team is forced to find the new victim on their own. Nolan and Harper manage to find the third victim alive but the killer manages to escape after attempting to drown Nolan in a storm drain. The episode ends with Lucy being drugged and forced into the back of a car by her date at a bar.
31	11	"Day of Death"	David McWhirter	Brynn Malone & Fredrick Kotto	February 23, 2020	211	4.92
Lucy awakes after being drugged by her date, tattooed by him with her "day of death". The station works to find Lucy after they realize they haven't seen her in 13 hours. It is revealed that her date, Caleb Wright, is the protégé of Rosalind Dyer. Caleb buries Lucy in a barrel in the middle of the desert then kidnaps Armstrong and takes him to a house that belonged to Rosalind's uncle, where Lucy is buried. Nolan and Harper track Caleb to the house, where Harper fatally shoots Caleb to save Armstrong. With Caleb dead, the officers spread out and search for Lucy, with Tim finding and performing CPR on her, saving her life. Lopez and Wesley discuss his mental health after she found him unconscious after mixing his pills with alcohol. Wesley decides to go to work after seeing what Lucy went through and acknowledges that he should seek help. Nolan visits Rosalind in prison, revealing that they found the locations where she buried her victims, meaning there will be no more deals. Rosalind tells him that she has one more secret, which is about Armstrong. Nolan tells her that he doesn't care about that but Rosalind replies that she knows he'll be back.
32	12	"Now and Then"	C. Chi-Yoon Chung	Robert Bella	March 1, 2020	212	4.55
Nolan takes his son's fiancé Abigail on a ride-along with Tim after she reveals she wants to be a police officer. Tim offers to put in a word for her at the police academy, but tells Nolan that she won't be able to become a cop due to her criminal record. Harper asks Tim to switch rookies for the week, where she will ride with a recovering Lucy. Lucy struggles to trust her judgment again, so Harper and Lopez take her to speed dating to try to regain her judgment. Lucy gets triggered and snaps when one of the men at the event pulls a loose thread on her sweater, throwing him to the ground. Lucy says that Harper will never understand what she went through, where Harper later reveals that she was raped by her UC handler and implies that she sent him to early retirement, throwing him down some stairs.
33	13	"Follow-Up Day"	Liz Friedlander	Alexi Hawley	March 8, 2020	213	5.12
Nolan learns of the news that his father has recently died, and inherits an old car. The rookies and their training officers are put through follow up day, where they're assigned dormant cases. Nolan and Harper investigate a robbery of lottery tickets while Jackson and Lopez investigate the theft of a statue. When Wesley's mother has been arrested for possessing an unlicensed gun, Wesley learns that she got the gun from Christian Roberts, who has a record of armed robberies, who Lopez and Jackson later arrest. Tim and Lucy investigate a case of money laundering involving Nevin Cooper, who has gone through rehab and working at a local bakery, but is still in debt to his former gang. Tim makes the bakery the go-to donut shop for fellow LAPD officers, forcing the gang to look elsewhere for laundering money due to cops frequenting the area. Tim receives his sergeant exam results, but turns down the offer of starting in North Hollywood, in favor of finishing training Lucy. Nolan meets his half-brother Pete (Pete Davidson), who twice steals the car he inherited, but they manage to work out a better relationship.
34	14	"Casualties"	Sylvain White	Bill Rinier	March 15, 2020	214	5.17
Lopez and Jackson are called to a man who is shot in the top of his head and seems to ramble. Tim and Lucy are called to a couple, where the wife reports to being stalked by a drone. Grey connects the two cases and solves them both. Nolan and Harper discover a body, identified as Joe Delacruz, in a warehouse. When they search Joe's hotel room, they find counterfeit money and encounter an Afghanistan war veteran, Mitch. Tim was Mitch's commanding officer when they served together. Grey, on orders from higher ups, orders them to let the case rest. Deciding against it, Tim learns that the DIA is behind the counterfeit related to an ongoing operation while Nolan is confronted by Norman Jangus, the main man of the operation, at his home. Tim makes Jangus give up who killed Joe Delacruz and decides that they should look away from the counterfeit. Lucy gives her dog, Kojo, to Tim, after he destroys her apartment and realizing she is not ready to be a dog owner.
35	15	"Hand-Off"	Michael Goi	Vincent Angell & Mary Trahan	March 22, 2020	215	5.18
Nolan's identity is stolen and he works to restore his credit score to remain a police officer and get his money back to fund Henry's college tuition. Grey and Lopez head to Lompoc Prison to testify at a parole hearing for a man who shot Grey and his partner Dennis Rowland, who died in Lopez's arms her first day on the job. Despite the man's parole being denied, Grey votes in favor of parole after interacting with the man and his son. While Grey and Lopez are at the hearing, Jackson is assigned to make sure the station is in compliance with all guidelines, during which he finds an unassigned unsolved vandalism case which leads to him solving a homicide. Tim meets Rachel's father, a former sheriff of a small town who reveals he does not want his daughter marrying a cop, especially since there's a chance Rachel might have Huntington's disease.
36	16	"The Overnight"	Stephanie Marquardt	Corey Miller & Rachael Seymour	April 5, 2020	216	5.87
Lucy and Tim respond to a call at the Los Angeles auditions of "American Idol" and Lucy ends up facing Ryan Seacrest and the judges. Lucy befriends a reporter (Roselyn Sanchez) whose motives are not clear, and later she and Tim have to save the reporter during an arrest. Harper asks Nolan to come along with her to her ex-husband Donovan's home to help her daughter who is having trouble sleeping. This leads to Nolan's life being put in danger during a domestic dispute with one of Donovan's neighbors. At the end, Wesley proposes to Lopez and she accepts his proposal. Note: This episode includes a joke referencing Melissa O'Neil's victory on the third season of Canadian Idol.
37	17	"Control"	Marcus Stokes	Alexi Hawley & Robert Bella	April 12, 2020	217	4.57
Nolan and Harper encounter Nolan's former C.I. Bianca, and she tells them that Ripper has returned with a large shipment of fentanyl. DEA Agent Michael Banks (Bailey Chase) arrives and they determine that Nolan and Harper must go in disguise to confront Ripper. They successfully agree to meet with Ripper, but everything goes wrong when Bianca confronts Ripper and tells him about the operation, but she is abducted. Meanwhile, Lucy meets a firefighter, Emmett, during a call and is intrigued by him. Lopez also interrogates a bank teller after a woman is murdered, and clashes with Detective Calderon on how the case should be handled. Banks offers Harper a job with the DEA after they successfully rescue and arrest Bianca, but she respectfully declines his offer.
38	18	"Under the Gun"	Tori Garrett	Terence Paul Winter & Elizabeth Davis Beall	April 26, 2020	218	4.96
Nolan and Harper are tasked with escorting four juvenile delinquents to a correctional facility, but find themselves entrapped in a prison riot during their processing. The pair find themselves forced to make an unlikely alliance with Oscar Hutchinson in order to safely evacuate their detainees from the prison, as well as saving the warden from the hostage situation. Meanwhile, Rachel and Tim have to rectify a mistake that caused a mother to lose custody of her ailing child after learning that a compromised water system was the cause of his sickness. Lopez and Jackson have to escort a tech analyst who has flagged Lopez as an officer most likely to cause problems in the department, and also have to subdue an active shooter at the tech analyst's office building.
39	19	"The Q Word"	David McWhirter	Natalie Callaghan & Nick Hurwitz	May 3, 2020	219	5.00
When a fellow rookie colleague Chris Rios (Christopher O'Shea) is fatally shot in broad daylight by a member of the Derian crime family, the entire police department commences a manhunt where multiple complications arise. Tim and Lucy raid the gunman's house and learn that an L.A.P.D. officer is on the crime family's payroll; Nolan and Harper recover the murder weapon from the crime scene, but find out it is stolen after a raid on Ruben Derian's residence; Jackson deals with the aftermath of Chris's death at the hospital while Lopez attempts to search for the mole. While viewing through the officers' body camera footage, Lopez learns that rookie officer Erin Cole (Hannah Kasulka) did not have her body camera function at all during her shift, with the Wilshire precinct conducting another manhunt on Erin. Nolan encounters a guilt-ridden Erin by himself and learns that she was the actual target of the assassination attempt, with Chris being collateral damage. Despite Nolan's successful attempt in calming her down, Erin is fatally shot by Armstrong. During the aftermath and inspired by a recent conversation with Harper, Nolan reviews his body camera footage and deduces that Armstrong was the actual mole working for the Derian family, and was working with (and betrayed) Erin.
40	20	"The Hunt"	Bill Roe	Alexi Hawley	May 10, 2020	220	4.66
Harper agrees to help Nolan after he shows her the footage. They lead Armstrong to an abandoned house to pick up his burner phone's signal in order to tap its records, but discover he had tossed it. Nolan talks to Rosalind, who reveals that, after Armstrong had broken into her house to secure evidence to arrest her, she broke into his and found a stash of guns, cash, and files that incriminate Armstrong. Nolan breaks into Armstrong's house and locates it before escaping, but Armstrong sees him as he departs. He alerts Serj Derian, who is arrested after a raid on his house. Armstrong invites Nolan back to his house, explaining that he got in too deep with the Derians once the costs for his deceased wife's medical bills became too much for him to handle. Armstrong reveals that he plans to incriminate Nolan as the mole before Nolan incapacitates Armstrong in a shootout, who reveals that he planted his stash in Nolan's house as Serj tells Grey that Nolan is the mole. Nolan finds the stash hidden inside a wall in his bedroom. Nolan is left standing in his bedroom as the police close in on him.

=== Season 3 (2021) ===
No. overall	No. in season	Title	Directed by	Written by	Original release date	Prod. code	U.S. viewers (millions)
41	1	"Consequences"	Bill Roe	Alexi Hawley	January 3, 2021	301	3.44
As Nolan finds the stash, Grey asks him to step out of his house but Nolan demands a warrant in order to buy time to hide the stash. He calls Wesley, who finds a positive pregnancy test. Armstrong implicates Harper as an accomplice of Nolan, but Harper explains Armstrong's corruption to Percy and Lopez is able to find Armstrong's go bag off of a tip from Rosalind. Nolan goes undercover to catch Ruben Derian, but his cover is blown when Armstrong escapes and makes a deal with Ruben after getting tipped off by Rosalind. As Armstrong prepares to execute Nolan, the gun he is given is revealed to be empty and the gang members kill him as part of a cover-up; Nolan is able to escape and arrest Ruben. Nolan and Harper both receive letters of reprimand in their personnel files. Nolan will be held in the training program for an additional month and must pass a disciplinary exam, with the reprimand also ruining any chance Nolan has of joining a specialized unit in the LAPD. Lopez receives a promotion to detective and opts to hold off on announcing her pregnancy out of fear that she will be treated differently.
42	2	"In Justice"	Michael Goi	Brynn Malone & Fredrick Kotto	January 10, 2021	302	3.15
As punishment for their part in the Armstrong fiasco, Nolan and Harper are assigned to a community policing center with the hope of rebuilding their station's reputation. While Nolan tries to make a positive impact, Harper has her doubts regarding his methods. Later, Harper bonds with James Murray, a man who works at the community center. Meanwhile, Lucy tries to find the person who stole her car, learning that the thief is a homeless teen named Tamara. Later, Lucy tries to help Tamara upon learning of her situation. Jackson gets off to a rocky start with his new training officer, Doug Stanton, who is revealed to be prejudiced against black people, and Lopez's first case as a detective is a difficult one as someone broke in to use a furnace to cremate a body. She later discovers that the body is one of many burned on the orders of a notorious gang.
43	3	"La Fiera"	Sylvain White	Terence Paul Winter & Natalie Callaghan	January 17, 2021	303	3.76
Nolan's life becomes more difficult when his mother (Frances Fisher) visits him. Distracted, Nolan fails his firearms re-qualification exam, and later stumbles upon a plot to assassinate a businesswoman with shady connections, La Fiera (Camille Guaty), when he returns to practice for the retake. Lopez, Nolan, Tim, Lucy, Jackson, and Doug successfully thwart the assassination. Also, Jackson and Doug continue to exchange blows when Doug opts to arrest an entire family who were not even connected to the crime the suspect that they're looking for committed. Jackson reports Doug to Grey with Tim's backing, but Jackson is outraged when Grey says that Doug will only be assigned to administrative duty. Grey later admits to his wife Luna that he and Jackson need to solve the issue with Doug.
44	4	"Sabotage"	Daniel Willis	Vincent Angell & Diana Mendez Boucher	January 24, 2021	304	3.39
As Grey and Jackson look to shut down Doug, Nolan and Grey are looped into a scam that their family members put money into—instigated by Nolan's troublesome visiting mother. Doug sets up Jackson by making it look like he was going to beat up a kid, but instead writes him up for failing to stay with the evidence after Jackson ran after him. Lopez is shocked when Wesley reveals that he is predisposed to fragile X syndrome, meaning the baby could have it. At the same time, Lopez confronts her supervisor, who she believes is not assigning her cases because of her pregnancy. Her supervisor, who was unaware that she was pregnant, tells her that's not the case, but it doesn't mean that he will be easy on her. Increasingly troubled by his mother's interference in his life and career, Nolan finally forces her to leave permanently.
45	5	"Lockdown"	Anna Mastro	Elizabeth Davis Beall & Robert Bella	February 14, 2021	305	4.08
As Nolan passes his disciplinary exam, he is once again reminded that he has a very little chance of ever getting promoted. He is later held hostage by a man (Josh Stewart) who threatens to blow up the police station unless the release of a dangerous felon happens, but Grey and Harper do not buy it and start to look for the real motive. Jackson and Doug reach a point of no return when Doug threatens to report a fireable offense against Jackson, with Jackson firing back that his father, the head of Internal Affairs, would rip apart Doug's career. Doug sets up Jackson to take a beating in a public housing complex, but it backfires when Jackson activates Doug's body camera, showing that Doug did not intervene in the beating. Doug is placed on suspension. Since he has no chance for a promotion, Nolan sets his sights becoming a training officer, which requires him to complete his degree.
46	6	"Revelations"	C. Chi-Yoon Chung	Corey Miller & Fredrick Kotto	February 21, 2021	307	4.11
Lucy gets a taste of what undercover work is like when she works with Harper and her Fresno PD colleague June Zhang in a narcotics operation, much to Tim's chagrin. Lucy's initial success brings her onboard an operation to take down Aldo Salonga. Nolan's return to school becomes difficult when he is outed as a police officer in his ethics class. After asking for advice from Tim and Harper, he is still unsure if it was a wise decision, and asks his professor, who expresses that one should be open, and that the other students will accept him again. Jackson befriends a mounted police officer, Isaac Young, while working with Smitty at the community policing centre. Tim, while working security at the undercover convention, meets a colleague, Mack Daniels, who appears to have an addiction problem—and an involvement in an extramarital affair. Despite taking firm action on Mack's behalf to help him, his trust with Mack's wife, Beth, sinks.
47	7	"True Crime"	Bill Roe	Alexi Hawley & Zoe Cheng	February 28, 2021	312	3.45
In a true crime documentary, the station breaks down a recent case of a former child actor, Corey Harris (guest star Frankie Muniz), known for his role in the fictional show Paul's Place, who turned into the leader of a cult that Lopez and Jackson had encountered previously. Harper and Nolan initially respond to a call where Corey was reported to have kidnapped a girl by her father; the father convinces her to leave with him. Corey is later reported missing after his house becomes a crime scene, with blood later identified to his former co-star, Charlotte Luster, and a mummified body of Charlie Chaplin is found under his bed. Charlotte is also reported missing, and her car found at LAX. Corey is later found alive, and remains silent for five hours before demanding a lawyer, revealed to be Wesley. Corey's mother is arrested after CCTV shows her parking Charlotte's car. She also confesses to the murder and claims sole responsibility. Corey himself is later murdered during a livestream to his followers, by Ronald Sanchez, a former student of his.
48	8	"Bad Blood"	Sylvain White	Paula Puryear & Bill Rinier	March 28, 2021	306	3.87
Nolan struggles to find the answer to a question he needs in order to take an exam for his ethics class. Lopez, Nolan, and Harper must work with Oscar Hutchinson (Matthew Glave) to find his previously unknown daughter (Molly C. Quinn), who is involved in the kidnapping of a judge's son. Tim looks for the tagger 3Eyez, who spray-painted his squad car as a rookie after the tagger resurfaces from retirement. He later discovers that she only came out of retirement because she wanted to feel young again after breaking up with her husband. Jackson is put in the middle of a debate between Grey and his father when the two argue about what Jackson should do once he completes the officers' field-training program. Jackson decides to accept advice from them both but makes it clear that it is too early for him to decide his career path. Nolan presents his answer to Professor Fiona Ryan, concluding that, based on insufficient information, all the given options would be wrong. She decides to let him take the exam.
49	9	"Amber"	Bill Roe	Brynn Malone & Natalie Callaghan	April 4, 2021	308	3.80
In what is Lucy and Jackson's final day as rookies, the department races against the clock when a newborn is kidnapped from the hospital. Nolan and Harper do a ride-along with Nolan's professor Fiona Ryan, who is working on a book about police reform, and Lopez, who is riding with Jackson on his final day as a rookie, contemplates what her future as a parent holds. She is reassured by Jackson and gets some advice from Harper during the search. The baby's father is later found after he crashes his car, but he is revealed to have never taken the baby. CCTV at the hospital reveal that a woman, Rita Cissane, kidnapped the baby after her own died of SIDS. They later find her on a bridge with the baby, and Nolan and Lopez manage to convince her to give up the baby. As Lucy and Jackson celebrate their last day as rookies, Harper invites Nolan for dinner with her and her daughter to cheer him up.
50	10	"Man of Honor"	Sylvain White	Elizabeth Davis Beall & Diana Mendez Boucher	April 11, 2021	309	3.70
Jackson and Lucy become full-fledged police officers. Jackson celebrates, but Lucy is hurt when her mother tries to get her to abandon her "thankless job". Ben comes to visit Nolan and reveals that Henry now works for him, which means he has dropped out of college. Harper feels awkward when she sees someone from her past. Tim assists Lopez with preparations for her and Wesley's wedding, and assures her to plan her own wedding the way she wants it. She later has him take over as her man of honor. Nolan responds to a call where a man is holding people hostage. He has the situation well in hand, but a nervous security guard shoots and kills the man. He later continues the investigation into the case with Harper's help. They discover that the man's family were disturbed by robbers who forced him to pay back, prompting him to rob a bank. His wife and daughter are abducted and the assailants force the wife to steal from her workplace. Nolan assists her while Harper causes a distraction, giving Lucy and Jackson enough time to find the daughter.
51	11	"New Blood"	Bill Roe	Corey Miller & Zoe Cheng	April 18, 2021	310	3.81
Nolan watches over Fiona, after threats escalate from a brick through her car window and harassing messages to a shootout with white supremacists in the middle of a street in broad daylight. As the new rookies arrive, one named Larry "the Badger" Macer—who fawned over Nolan, saying Nolan's academy success inspired him in turn—accidentally fires his gun, which ends his police career before it begins. Lucy becomes jealous of the way Tim treats the second rookie, Katie Barnes, a female former soldier who he tries to help readjust back to civilian life. Katie resigns at the end of the day, saying she needs to find her way. Tim assists Lopez and Wesley in planning their wedding, acting as a third party when Wesley's mother comes over to look over the plans. She later reconciles with Lopez and urges her to plan her wedding the way she wants it. Henry returns to Los Angeles to begin his new job, with Nolan struggling to be supportive of his son's choice to leave school. He becomes more accepting of his son's decision after a talk with Fiona, but then Henry collapses at dinner.
52	12	"Brave Heart"	Lisa Demaine	Vincent Angell & Paula Puryear	May 2, 2021	311	4.00
Henry is rushed to the hospital following his collapse. He tells his parents that he wants the more dangerous long-term surgery, then has a heart attack before he can tell the doctor. Nolan chooses the long-term option, and the gamble is successful. La Fiera has taken her injured son, Diego, to the same hospital, but the police soon realize she is actually there to negotiate an agreement with a major drug dealer, Tomás Madrigal, who is close to death and knows his son Cesar is incapable of running the business. Harper surreptitiously records the conversation. Lopez unsuccessfully confronts La Fiera twice, trying to warn her off. Billie, an addict slightly injured when arrested by Jackson and Lucy, is made to admit she is a drug mule carrying MDMA in her stomach and is offered a deal. When a condom bursts, she is taken for surgery. Cesar has Diego assassinated in the underground parking garage at the hospital, but La Fiera is protected by Lopez in the ensuing gunfight. After La Fiera grieves over her son, Grey realizes a drug war is coming. Mack has been reduced to temporary security work for the Madrigals, and Tim offers support for his addiction.
53	13	"Triple Duty"	Bill Johnson	Teleplay by : Natalie Callaghan & Zoe Cheng & Paula Puryear; Story by : Bill Rinier	May 9, 2021	313	3.91
La Fiera starts her war by massacring Cesar's men at a drug deal but comes to the attention of a DEA task force. Lopez negotiates with her to cease hostilities in exchange for Harper's hospital tape, which will convince Cesar's lieutenants of the agreement's validity. Tim and Nolan stakeout Cesar's girlfriend's house and prevent La Fiera's men from killing her baby as revenge for Diego's murder. DEA agent Taggert tries to belittle Lopez. He obtains the tape over her head and has Lopez deliver it on a USB stick, but La Fiera sees through his stratagem of including surveillance malware on the stick. The war highlights a need for undercover work so Harper puts Lucy though a series of intense tests: a social gathering with "criminals", a drug-cooking session, and a phony attempted kidnapping. Offered a last chance to pull out, Lucy remains determined to go undercover. Jackson learns Doug is still on the force and has not changed. He threatens to go public even though Grey thinks it may cost Jackson his career. Instead they improvise, having Doug's watch commander use the body-cam footage from the assault on Jackson as a "retraining" video to expose Doug to his colleagues; Jackson grimly remarks that this is the real Doug Stanton.
54	14	"Threshold"	Lisa Demaine	Alexi Hawley	May 16, 2021	314	3.77
The LAPD plan to make Cesar Madrigal an informant against La Fiera, and Nolan approaches Cesar's girlfriend about persuading him to talk. However, as Nolan and Smitty locate Cesar, he is assassinated. Later, on patrol, they chase a shoplifter who, after being arrested, is charged with assault instead of a misdemeanor, on the grounds that Nolan had accidentally dislocated his own finger during the pursuit. Nolan brings Fiona into the case and manages to get Grey's backing to force ADA Sean Del Monte to reduce the charge. Lucy starts her undercover work in a rundown motel and is grabbed by Aldo Salonga's brother Dahrio, who forces her to participate in a robbery to obtain ingredients for the drugs he wants her to cook. Her work is interrupted when La Fiera storms Dahrio's compound to force him to join her cartel but the police, alerted by Harper, arrive to arrest the gang. Lopez tells La Fiera that she has only herself to blame for her son's death. La Fiera later escapes out from her prisoner transport, and as Wesley and Lopez's wedding ceremony begins, Nolan enters the room and discovers Lopez's bracelet on the floor with Lopez herself missing.

=== Season 4 (2021–22) ===
No. overall	No. in season	Title	Directed by	Written by	Original release date	Prod. code	U.S. viewers (millions)
55	1	"Life and Death"	Bill Roe	Alexi Hawley	September 26, 2021	401	3.03
In the midst of Lopez's kidnapping, Jackson is killed by La Fiera's men while trying to save her. Grey and Wesley enlist the help of the DEA, but they are bound by the political ramifications of the case. Nolan, Tim and Harper enlist Max, who gives them a helicopter and arms to rescue Lopez, who has been brought to Guatemala. Wesley receives help from a criminal, Elijah Stone, in exchange for future favors before travelling there himself to make a deal with La Fiera. La Fiera threatens to kill Lopez once her baby is born. Nolan and the others resort to their backup plan. Wesley is separated from Lopez as she is brought to the hospital in a staged labor. Tim and Harper ambush La Fiera at the hospital and save Lopez, who shoots La Fiera dead before they escape in the helicopter, avenging Jackson. Nolan saves Wesley from La Fiera's remaining goons. Three months later, Lopez has given birth to her and Wesley's son, who they name Jackson in honor of Jackson West.: Because Titus Makin Jr. left the show after the third season, an uncredited stand-in played Jackson West in the security camera footage of his death.
56	2	"Five Minutes"	Lisa Demaine	Brynn Malone	October 3, 2021	402	3.09
Tim is promoted to Sergeant and leads the roll call as a new rookie, Aaron Thorsen, is handed to Harper. Harper is convinced Aaron does not have what it takes to become a cop, as he is suffering from memories of his trial for having allegedly murdered his roommate in Paris. However, Aaron takes on the courage to be motivated to become a cop, convincing Harper to change her mind. Nolan and Lucy pull over a notorious thief, Claire Ivey, for speeding, and she gives them a clue for an upcoming robbery. The department conduct a stakeout against Claire and her crew and manage to prevent the robbery by disguising themselves as the targeted convoy. Nolan gets the nerve to ask firefighter Bailey Nune out for a date, to which she agrees, but after a night together, she initially breaks up with him. Afterwards, he manages to convince her that she can change and try out a first relationship.
57	3	"In the Line of Fire"	Daniel Willis	Robert Bella	October 10, 2021	403	2.69
Nolan and Lucy respond to a house fire and rescue a man trapped inside. The LAFD discovers a body inside after the fire is put out; an autopsy reveals that he was killed before the fire occurred. While on a break, Nolan, Lucy, Tim, Harper and Webb witness a sniper shooting at a private escort vehicle. The sniper escapes, and Harper and Aaron discover that the sniper has military experience. Nolan and Lucy investigate a suspect pool and question Aidan Merritt, who briefly holds them hostage in his own home before Nolan subdues him. Caught in debt to crime boss Elijah Stone after Lopez's rescue in Guatemala, Wesley is forced to work for him, putting his career at risk. Elijah assigns him to defend Aidan. Lopez investigates the fire and the suspect pool, revealing to Nolan and Bailey that multiple similar fires occurred in Nevada, suggesting a serial killer is on the loose.
58	4	"Red Hot"	Lisa Demaine	Diana Mendez Boucher	October 17, 2021	404	2.83
Lopez returns to work, while Nolan investigates an alleged home dispute where a wife has escaped from her husband's house. Nolan later finds the woman, Linda Charles, walking in an alley, disoriented and speaking a foreign language. The husband and his assistant arrive and pull guns on them as Nolan's suspicions are heightened. All three of them are later revealed to be Russian agents, with Linda Charles, real name Katerina Antonov, having gone rogue. Harper and Aaron investigate a hit and run involving a bike, where the biker was taken away by the driver. Harper tracks the stolen car to a warehouse, where she finds the victim knocked unconscious. As she is about to run after the suspect, the warehouse is caught ablaze, but she manages to escape with the victim. Nolan and Bailey discover a chip that Katerina lost in his patrol car, only for her to hold Bailey hostage. They manage to break up the fight until the FBI arrest Katerina. Lopez concludes that the warehouse fire was caused by the same assailant from the previous episode. Elijah Stone has Aidan Merritt killed after Wesley can't work out a way for him to be released, serving as a last warning to him.
59	5	"A.C.H."	Daniel Willis	Zoe Cheng & Paula Puryear	October 31, 2021	405	2.64
Halloween in Los Angeles has Nolan and Harper detaining a crazed person in a park, in what initially seems like a zombie attack. They learn at the hospital that the woman took a drug, Bomb-X. Lucy assists a neighbor with two ghost hunters who wants to charge her more money than what she can afford. Lopez is handed the case, but the victim, Mrs. Crouch, later decides to drop the case. However, Lopez does learn that the apartment building is in fact haunted. Lucy and Tamara investigate the alleged ghosts that the ghost hunters mentioned, only to discover another neighbour being attacked by a stalker. Lucy manages to stop him. Tim encounters another person affected by Bomb-X. He and Nolan enlist Nolan's half brother, Pete, to wear a wire to buy the drug, and they later catch the supplier. Nolan later helps Pete reconcile with the latter's girlfriend.
60	6	"Poetic Justice"	C. Chi Yoon Chung	Bill Rinier & Natalie Callaghan	November 7, 2021	406	2.72
Tim is tasked by Grey to talk veteran officer Jerry McGrady into retiring, and Tim decides to take Jerry with him on patrol. Nolan, Lucy, and Harper start investigating a treasure hunt, based on a cryptic poem which Nolan and Harper found with a suspect. Tim and Jerry join the hunt, as evidence from an old case worked by Jerry proves to be connected to it. They decipher the poetic clues, which lead them to civilians harming each other, also in the hunt for the treasure. Nolan, Harper, and Lucy track the clues to an old abandoned 1920s subway, and are forced to tackle two men who end up in a brawl. The station bids farewell to Jerry after he announces his retirement himself. Jerry's daughter Ashley hints to Tim that she's interested in him. Nolan, Bailey and Lopez continue the investigation into the previously mentioned serial killer, who Nolan suspects to be Bailey's lieutenant, Fred Mitchell, after he discovers acetone similar to the one used by the killer in his garage, and Bailey searches for evidence in his house. Just as the police arrive with a search warrant, Fred's house explodes.
61	7	"Fire Fight"	Tori Garrett	Corey Miller	November 14, 2021	407	2.59
Bailey is severely injured in the explosion and has to use crutches. Lopez, Nolan, and Harper reopen the serial arson investigation after a colleague of Bailey reveals that Fred was in the hospital in Nevada at the time of the murders. They also conclude that the real killer was trying to frame him. Tim and Lucy investigate several cases of alleged illegal substances used in makeup and skin cream, and one of the rivals reveals that the other is planning to have her husband killed by a hitman. Tim goes in undercover as a hitman and arrests the woman in question after she admits to it. Nolan is captured by the real killer, revealed to be Fred's neighbor, Marcus. Nolan is subjected to a cat-and-mouse chase in an abandoned silo complex, eventually escaping and running Marcus over, arresting him in the process. Wesley continues his dealings for Elijah Stone, notably discrediting a witness. Having reached his limit following a near-beating from Elijah, due to a lack of communication on his part, he eventually comes clean to Lopez.
62	8	"Hit and Run"	Bill Roe	Vincent Angell	December 5, 2021	408	2.78
Lopez asks Wesley to record everything when in contact with Elijah Stone, but he refuses due to client confidentiality and privilege. Nolan and Lopez arrive to talk to "sovereign citizen" Marvin Reynolds, but he shoots at them and escapes, becoming a wanted felon. Tim's sister Genny arrives in Los Angeles to sell their father's house. Harper and Aaron search Marvin's RV, where they discover weapons and a manifesto. Aaron also gives Harper advice when she reveals that her ex-husband wants to move with their daughter to San Francisco, and Harper decides to fight the custody battle for her daughter. The police corner Marvin at the Battleship USS Iowa Museum and eventually shoot him. Tim decides to join Genny in renovating the house, but refuses to visit their father, and also officially endorses Nolan for union representative. Lopez builds a RICO case against Elijah, but learns that Wesley told Grey and that they plan to use Wesley as an informant.
63	9	"Breakdown"	C. Chi-Yoon Chung	Alexi Hawley	December 12, 2021	409	2.66
Tim and Lucy assist his sister, Genny, with refurbishing their childhood home. Tim discovers a gun in a wall, and he and Lucy open an investigation. The gun was suspected to have been used by Tim's father in a botched home invasion 25 years ago. His father had an affair with the neighbor's wife; she later confessed to having shot her husband in self-defense, and Tim's father helped her cover it up. Tim visits his father on his death bed, but still doesn't forgive him. Grey initiates Wesley's wiretapping operation, but his cover is blown by Elijah, who threatens Wesley's family. Sometime later, Elijah and his crew are attacked by a rival gang, which Elijah reveals to be led by La Fiera's security enforcer, Abril. Elijah is arrested shortly afterwards, and Abril warns Lopez not to hunt her down. Nolan has Bailey meet his son Henry for the first time, and considers proposing to her, which Henry approves of. However, as the two are out eating, a man walks up and reveals himself to be Bailey's husband.
64	10	"Heart Beat"	S. J. Main Muñoz	Fredrick Kotto	January 2, 2022	410	2.84
Nolan learns of Bailey's marriage to Jason Wyler, who abused her psychologically and has just been released from prison early for good behavior. A small plane crash on the streets has the precinct staggered when no pilot is found. The plane's owner, billionaire Levi Lincoln, convicted of murdering his wife, turns up alive and having paid another man to serve his prison time for him. Wesley's law license is suspended for six months over his forced dealings with Elijah, but his volunteering legal counsel at the community center takes a troubling turn involving a youth trying to free himself of a drug dealer's grip. Tim asks Lucy's help teaching the dog she gave him to get along with Ashley after their relationship becomes serious. Bailey confronts Jason and demands he make good on his promise to sign off on their divorce at last. Nolan is forced to turn to Oscar to gain information on both Levi and Jason. Nolan and Harper lead the precinct in capturing Levi at a small private airport following a shootout in a hangar. Jason plants drugs in Bailey's car and she is arrested. Nolan promises Bailey he will help set her free before confronting Jason.
65	11	"End Game"	Tori Garrett	Terence Paul Winter	January 9, 2022	411	2.85
Grey authorizes an investigation into Jason, and Nolan turns back to Oscar Hutchinson for further help along the way. Lucy and Tim investigate the murder of an 18 year old girl, Becca, who turns out to have been a friend of Tamara Colins. They learn that Becca had stolen a watch from a man she met on a social media app, and pawned it at a pawn shop. The shopkeeper also gives them the name of the perpetrator, Declan, who in turn was also a friend of Tamara and Becca. Harper discovers she is pregnant with James' child, and she is determined to keep it. Aaron struggles to decide if he wants to shoot a reality program with his mother to give his narrative of Patrick's murder, which he later decides to do. Nolan and Bailey expose Jason's motives to another woman, leading to him turning himself in and cooperating with the police in an undercover mission against the Southern Front. However, Oscar informs Nolan that he pulled a double-cross by informing the criminals about Jason, leading to Jason attempting to flee among the chaos, but eventually being arrested by Nolan.
66	12	"The Knock"	Charissa Sanja- rernsuithikul	Zoe Cheng	January 23, 2022	412	2.83
Nolan is elected as the station's union representative, aiming to accomplish changes, which is met with antagonism from the union president, Lt. Landon Briggs. Lucy and Tim discover a severed hand on the beach, which is identified to have belonged to Mark Klinke, who had managed to get himself to a hospital before dying. He worked for a biotech company, headed by Devin Swaine, who is reluctant to reveal any further information due to confidentiality. His lawyer, in a desperate attempt, tries to seek access to the culprit, Chester Frey's house, which Lopez denies. The police discover that Chester had obtained multiple human arms to test if they could be healed and animated. Tim and Lucy ambush him in the morgue and arrest him. Grey accompanies Italian detective Romeo Cabarelli in a hunt to find wanted fugitive Kai Zullo; however, upon them finding Kai, Romeo fires on him without signs of him pulling a gun. Grey becomes suspicious. Romeo is revealed to be under investigation for misconduct in Italy. Grey, Nolan, and Harper trick him into an arrest of Kai, leading to Romeo's own arrest in addition.
67	13	"Fight or Flight"	Lanre Olabisi	Brynn Malone	January 30, 2022	413	3.19
Nolan and Lucy pursue a stolen police helicopter, which a teen, Leo, stole. Leo refuses to land until they fulfill three quests of his, the first of which includes a known drug house, where they arrest the occupants. The second includes a man connected to his stepfather, who was dealing drugs. Leo's third quest is that he wants them to arrest his stepfather. Grey manages to get the drug dealer to give evidence against Leo's stepfather, who is then arrested. Leo is also arrested once the helicopter runs out of fuel; however, he is released on bail. Tim and Lopez investigate a string of burglaries with ties to a friend of Tim, Des Robinson, who gives up the robbers' identities. However, they find evidence connecting Des to the robbers, before arresting them. Aaron and Harper guard an escaped convict at the hospital, who allegedly killed a cop. Aaron is convinced of his innocence, and calls in James and Wesley to assist. CCTV footage from the prison proves that the convict injured a guard during the riot. Wesley manages to get a lawyer who wants to take the convict's case.
68	14	"Long Shot"	Fernando Sariñana	Natalie Callaghan	February 27, 2022	414	3.67
Skip Tracer Randy arrives at the station to meet Nolan and Harper about a bounty on a notorious Madam, Ivy Flynn, whom he sets out to capture. They roll out on a sting operation, where another bounty hunter, Alicia Kaufman, is about to apprehend Ivy before she escapes amid an argument. Alicia is revealed to be Randy's lover who wants to capture Ivy. A vice investigator tells Nolan and Harper that Ivy had wealthy and powerful clients and received funding from organized crime. At a hotel, they arrest Ivy, but are attacked. Alicia arrives and takes Ivy for herself, but Nolan assists her when they are ambushed. Lopez recommends Wesley for a legal consultant role in a new TV series, but the lead actress' odd behavior puts him on edge. Tim and Lucy look for Jordan Conner, who unleashed rats in the restaurant where she worked after getting fired and burned her ex-boyfriend's car. When they find her, she reveals she had cancer before learning it had gone into remission. Lucy tries to find her biological father, and learns from her aunt Amy that he was one of her mother's therapy patients who she had a relationship with.
69	15	"Hit List"	Robert Bella	Elizabeth Davis Beall	March 6, 2022	415	3.88
Aaron's Plain-Clothes Day gets tough when he and Harper discover his mother's film crew following them. He later encounters the father of Patrick Hayes, the friend whom he was accused of having killed; Aaron is forced to arrest Patrick's father after he tries to punch him, but decides to let him go out of respect. As Grey is heading to court to testify in a case against a mobster, two people are murdered, both of whom are revealed to have been witnesses in the same case Grey is testifying in. He is wounded by a female assassin, who he manages to kill. In a raid, the LAPD uncovers burned documents that points to attorney Kellen Myers, who Lopez learns sold the names of the witnesses and the prosecutors to Mateo Rubio in exchange for money. Kellen also reveals that ADA Sean Del Monte is on the hit list. Del Monte and Chris manage to avoid a second assassin and hold out until officers arrive to apprehend him. Grey contemplates retirement when he awakes in the hospital and soul searches with help from Nolan, returning the favor Grey did him after Nolan's first on-the-job kill.
70	16	"Real Crime"	Rob Seidenglanz	Bill Rinier & Paula Puryear	March 13, 2022	416	3.29
Aaron reality show crew interviews precinct officers about the crime investigation after the show's director, Morris Mackey, is murdered in Aaron's parents' home. Aaron himself is among the suspects. The documentary also brings up the murder of the second half of his father's rap duo, which is still unsolved. Patrick Hayes' father is also questioned, as are Aaron's friends who were with him in Paris. Patrick's case is brought back into the spotlight when the police suspect the murders are connected. Aaron's mother is also revealed to have been in Paris when Patrick was murdered, but reveals she had a sexual fling with a French footballer. The French investigation into the Hayes murder is criticized for its lack of attention to other suspects, one of them being the finance minister's son. The police eventually conclude that Aaron's friend Rowan Clausen committed both murders, having always been the instigator for friend activities and opportunity in order to use the latter to smuggle drugs on Aaron's private plane; Rowan killed Patrick for discovering and threatening to out his smuggling operation, and then Morris for figuring out he was behind the first murder. In the end, Patrick's father asks for forgiveness, which Aaron accepts.
71	17	"Coding"	Bill Roe	Nick Hurwitz & Sylvia Franklin	April 3, 2022	417	3.50
Nolan is first on the scene of a car accident whose lone occupant suffered catastrophic injuries, but is still conscious. He talks with her as she dies. She's an organ donor, so he accompanies her body to the hospital. A teenager is first in line for the victim's heart. Harper is at the same hospital due to potential pregnancy complications. Lucy is scheduled to give a deposition about her kidnapping for additional charges against Rosalind Dyer. Things start going wrong at the hospital because a man hacked the system to put his wife first on the list for a transplant. Officers try to talk him and his wife out of their plan, but fail. Despite instituting contingency plans, patients start dying and the hospital agrees to give the heart to the wife. Nolan lets the other recipient talk to the wife, who changes her mind and backs out of the plot. When the hacker tries to release the hospital, his ransomware partners switch to a pure money demand. The officers find them and upon the two being arrested, the hospital returns to normal. Harper closes an ongoing kidnapping case and after some rough times, Lucy decides not to contribute to the case against Rosalind.
72	18	"Backstabbers"	Tori Garrett	Vincent Angell	April 10, 2022	418	3.53
Nolan and Lucy join forces with Larry "Badger" Macer, who is now working for railway police, in investigating the robbery of a cargo train, where a vase was stolen from a freight car belonging to millionaire William Bloomfield. Together with Lopez and Harper, they learn that William's cellmate stole the vase, but is later found dead in his home. William himself points them towards his own teenaged children: Francis, Danielle and Zachary. Larry deduces that a missing piece of the vase had a bank account number on it, which might have been the motive for the theft. Nolan, Lucy, and Larry return to the train yard after a burning car on the tracks is called in. There they find William's children fighting over the money, with Francis revealed as the killer. Aaron struggles to find his "superpower" while patrolling with Tim. But after talking down a man on parole from visiting his child, Tim notes that his experience from being in jail gives him the ability to sympathize with people who experienced the same. Harper proposes to James, but he becomes uncertain afterwards due to her suddenness. They agree to marry and the wedding is attended by family and friends.
73	19	"Simone"	Liz Friedlander	Alexi Hawley & Terence Paul Winter	April 24, 2022	419	3.95
Nolan and Lucy narrowly escape a bomb at a power station. The FBI is called in when it is suspected that the bomber belongs to a terrorist cell. When the FBI learns that the suspect, Zeke Freemont, has a connection to FBI trainee Simone Clark, they call her in to assist, but she is soon dismissed. Nolan encourages her to stand up for herself. Lead agent Matt Garza calls her in to question Zeke as Zeke only wants to speak to her. He reveals that he built bombs but did not know what they were for. Lopez and Harper investigate a supposed break in at a professor's house, and with Simone's help, discover that it was the same suspect as the bombing, who is later identified as Trevor Gurin, who has a classified connection to Groom Lake. Garza reluctantly takes Simone on to his team. Through map evidence at the suspect's house and the codeword "Enervo", they deduce that Trevor was former military. Trevor steals more bombs from the National Guard's weapon storage, and initiates his plan to take down LA's infrastructure. Note: This episode is a crossover with The Rookie: Feds.
74	20	"Enervo"	Bill Roe	Alexi Hawley & Terence Paul Winter	May 1, 2022	420	4.17
The LAPD and FBI race to stop bombs that have been scattered throughout the city on vans. Deducing that the targets are every freeway, Simone leads herself and Nolan in the direction of one of the trucks and stops it. The police manages to stop all but one of the vans from detonating. Garza and Grey approach the CIA in hope of help, but its leader, Bill August, turns them down, though promises to look into the classified file on Trevor. Tim and Nolan meet one of the former's former associates, Kate Hill, who works for the CIA. She reveals that "Enervo" was a black Ops designed to destabilize foreign cities, headed by Bill and the lead perpetrator being Trevor, whose real name is Ilya Sokorov. Simone follows a lead with the help of Zeke identifying a Russian chocolate bar Ilya had. She confronts him near the aquarium before Nolan arrives. They track Ilya into the aquarium, where he explains that Bill deserted him and his crew and left them for dead, and his acts of terrorism was revenge. Just then, Bill's men arrive and a shootout ensues, but the LAPD and FBI are able to arrest them. Note: This episode is a crossover with The Rookie: Feds.
75	21	"Mother's Day"	Lisa Demaine	Fredrick Kotto & Diana Mendez Boucher	May 8, 2022	421	3.68
Grey expresses support for Nolan's desire to become a TO. They respond to a call at a film set, where a woman explains that another woman, Monica Ditmar, attempted to rob her. Tim and Lucy respond to a robbery, while Lopez and her mother-in-law are robbed. Grey and Nolan set up a boundary for Daniel Tran, a gang informant who is entering witness protection. Del Monte reluctantly allows Daniel to visit his mother, but he escapes protection. As Grey and Nolan find him, they incapacitate two men sent to kill Daniel. Nolan manages to disarm another assassin and save Daniel. Tim and Lucy discover Monica and her boyfriend Jonah Cahill, at a church, where they force forward their own wedding, but as Monica spots them, a shootout occurs. Jonah is injured, while Monica escapes. As Jonah is transferred to a surgery, Lopez lures a disguised Monica to another patient's room before arresting her. Wesley decides to take on a higher position at the DA's office following advice from his mother. Grey later informs Nolan that he will be transferred to a new station due to Nolan angering the union president, forcing him to miss his TO exam.
76	22	"Day in the Hole"	Alexi Hawley	Alexi Hawley	May 15, 2022	422	3.65
Nolan and Bailey travel to the border town of Frontera, where he is to spend his "day in the hole" with local trainee Gabrielle Navar. They arrest a man, Blair Darvill, who asks them to let him go before his gang gets suspicious, but Nolan refuses. Its leader arrives and tries to bribe Nolan, but when he refuses, the gang attacks the station-diner in an attempt to retrieve Blair. With a combined effort with Gabrielle and Ellroy, they defeat the gang and have the survivors arrested as the CHP arrives to assist. In Los Angeles, Lucy investigates the discovery of drugs in Tamara's new car, which turns out to belong to Jake Butler, a doppelganger of Tim. Reluctantly, he agrees to go in undercover to Jake's boss, Roy Hajek, who gives him another mission. Lucy is surprised to discover that Jake's girlfriend is a doppelganger of herself, and is tasked to work with Tim undercover, although they struggle to make an authentic backstory for the two and unexpectedly kiss. Harper approaches Grey and asks to stay on as a detective after her maternal leave, which he accepts and arranges for Aaron to receive a new TO.

=== Season 5 (2022–23) ===
No. overall	No. in season	Title	Directed by	Written by	Original release date	Prod. code	U.S. viewers (millions)
77	1	"Double Down"	Tori Garrett	Alexi Hawley	September 25, 2022	501	3.36
As a reward, Nolan is offered a "Golden Ticket", his choice of assignment in the LAPD. His fellow officers all have suggestions for him but the chief urges him to think it over. While Tim and Lucy continue their undercover assignment with Roy's crew, Nolan and Grey assist with securing the courthouse for the trial of Rosalind Dyer. With the help of her deranged attorney, Rosalind escapes by killing the deputy assigned to guard her. Grey gathers the loved ones of his officers at the station for protection while he, Nolan and Harper help with the manhunt. Tim and Lucy learn of the escape while en route to Las Vegas but Lucy insists on continuing with the assignment. They rendezvous with Lopez and Aaron at a casino and make a plan to take down Roy's crew and their employer, but their cover is blown by an ex of Tim's doppelganger. Lucy manages to subdue and arrest the crew. Nolan decides that he wants to become a TO. Rosalind is able to escape LA after robbing and murdering her attorney's parents as part of a favor and then slitting Chris' wrists in Lucy's apartment, where she and Tim find him.
78	2	"Labor Day"	Rob Seidenglanz	Elizabeth Davis Beall	October 2, 2022	502	2.93
Chris recovers from his injuries. Lucy is offered to go to undercover school, but is hesitant. Nolan passes his TO exam and is scheduled to attend a certification course, and Grey allows him to be Aaron's TO as a trial run. The two respond to a welfare check and discover a deputy sheriff's corpse. The ensuing investigation reveals that the deputy and his colleagues worked undercover against drug dealers, but instead took the cash from the criminals. The deputy left recordings of his interactions with his colleagues proving their corruption. Harper is on maternity leave and is due to give birth, but becomes suspicious of her and James' neighbors. Once gunshots are heard, Smitty arrives and investigates, but does not find any evidence of her claims. Harper later sees the neighbors putting a corpse in a car trunk and reports her suspicions to Grey. The night she is due to give birth, the neighbors break into her house and one of them attacks James as Grey arrives. Harper manages to incapacitate the second man and gives birth to a baby girl. Nolan expresses that he did not feel he taught Aaron much, but Aaron assures Nolan that he helped.
79	3	"Dye Hard"	Bethany Rooney	Natalie Callaghan	October 9, 2022	503	3.12
One month later, Nolan has finished his TO certification, Lucy has finished her undercover course and Harper has returned to work. Nolan is assigned rookie Celina Juarez. A vehicle in a traffic stop has a bloodstained carpet, linked to the disappearance of Jill Baskin, whose case Harper has taken on. With Lopez and Harper, Nolan and Celina follow Jill's suspected abductor Tyler Harvin, but he escapes. While looking through evidence, Celina has a dream about where Jill could be held. Nolan decides to give her a chance, and the two search a property in the woods, where they find Jill. Celina pursues Tyler and fights him before Nolan locates her and arrests Tyler. Lucy is locked inside an old warehouse while conducting a welfare check. She has an epiphany after looking through a document from the Dye Hards, an online group Chris joined looking into Rosalind. After Tim and Aaron find her, she and Chris approach the FBI with the suspicion of Rosalind being a user in the group, which they track to an address in Seattle. Lucy joins the team to the city and find two dead bodies, as well as a message from Rosalind.: Britt Robertson (Laura Stensen) and Felix Solis (Matt Garza) are credited as special guest stars.
80	4	"The Choice"	Bill Roe	Fredrick Kotto	October 16, 2022	504	3.08
While responding to a supposed medical emergency, Bailey falls through the floor of an old house into a tank. Nolan receives a call from Rosalind, who asks him to come and meet her one last time. The tank begins to fill up with water. Harper, Lopez and Aaron investigate a warehouse where an acolyte of Rosalind, Jeffrey Boyle, has stored materials for building booby traps for her victims. They spot Jeffrey and chase him, but he triggers explosives which detonate the warehouse, which they narrowly escape. With notes of how the traps work, the rescue team manage to disarm other traps while activating a last one before Bailey is recovered from the tank. Nolan arrives at Rosalind's meet up location and the two have a last supper before he is meant to kill her in order to save Bailey's life. But living up to his moral, Nolan does not kill her and decides to bring her in. However, as he calls it in, a concealed Jeffrey shoots and kills her. Nolan has a tearful reunion with Bailey as the FBI arrive to take over the case. Note: This episode begins a crossover event that concludes on The Rookie: Feds season 1 episode 4. Britt Robertson (Laura Stenson) and Kevin Zegers (Brendon Acres) are credited as special guest stars. This episode includes the last appearance of Annie Wersching, who died of breast cancer on January 29, 2023, at the age of 45.
81	5	"The Fugitive"	Cherie Nowlan	Diana Mendez Boucher	October 23, 2022	505	3.40
Lopez's mother is attacked by someone claiming one of her sons is "out of time." Harper takes the case, and Lopez calls in her three brothers in L.A. None of them admits to knowledge of their mother's assailant; Lopez later learns one brother, Benny, was in debt after investing money in the stock market and a loan shark came after him. They arrest the loan shark for attacking Lopez's mother. Nolan and Celina respond to a car accident, but the driver escapes from the ambulance upon arriving at the hospital. The driver, Rob Lukasey, killed a woman in a home invasion and was shot by her husband in self-defense. The hospital is put on lockdown as Rob tries to treat himself. He disguises himself as a paramedic and then a doctor before taking Celina hostage; she ultimately subdues him with morphine. While helping at the hospital, Tim is hospitalized with after effects of a previous bullet wound. He has a surgery and successfully recovers, but Ashley breaks up with him. Grey is also hospitalized with food poisoning after eating at a restaurant, leaving Smitty and Lucy in charge of the station with Lucy managing to successfully keep everything running.
82	6	"The Reckoning"	Lanre Olabisi	Leland Jay Anderson	October 30, 2022	506	3.52
Nolan and Celina respond to a money dispute at a bank, which is revealed to have been burned following a robbery. Celina suspects that the money is cursed after a woman from the bank is found dead. Harper and Lopez launch an investigation with a DEA agent after it is revealed that the money once belonged to drug smuggler Winslow Harris. Celina has another dream where she believes Winslow will depart by boat. Together with Nolan and Celina, they apprehend Winslow at the marina. Tim loses his radio while helping a director, who returns it to Lucy. She puts Tim and Aaron out on a hunt for it, before returning it, hoping it would help Tim move on from the breakup with Ashley. Wesley and Del Monte proceed with the case against Elijah, and Wesley is surprised to learn that his ex-girlfriend Monica Stevens is Elijah's defense attorney. She tries to portray Wesley and the LAPD as incompetent and goes out of her way to make the case personal for Wesley. Despite his warnings to her that Elijah is manipulative, she threatens Del Monte into dropping the case. Elijah later meets Wesley outside the office and intimidates him.
83	7	"Crossfire"	Jon Huertas	Glen Mazzara	November 6, 2022	507	3.02
Elijah launches a lawsuit against the LAPD. He also files a restraining order against Wesley and forces him to publicly apologize. Nolan and Celina investigate the murder of doctor Alvin Mitchelsen, who was already dead when he was shot by a former patient. Initially they discover that he was stabbed, but medical examination further adds that he was poisoned. His former patient reveals that she shot Alvin due to his mistreatment of her father's drugs, while his wife reveals he had heart problems before his death. Nolan and Celina deduce this as a cover-up of her actually having killed him with poisoning via drugs. Aaron connects with a young boy, Tabin Cordon, after he and Tim respond to a noise complaint, but Tabin is later revealed to be the brother of Vina Cordon, a member of the a gang led by Shana Quelli, who Harper, Lopez and Lucy are investigating for a murder. Lucy goes in undercover and makes connections with Shana, while Tabin is temporarily reunited with his sister. During debt collecting, Shana alludes to Vina having murdered the victim Harper and Lopez were investigating, and Vina is later arrested while trying to frame Tabin.
84	8	"The Collar"	Robert Bella	Paula Puryear	December 4, 2022	508	3.75
Aaron rides with Harper and Lopez as part of his desire to become a detective. The two give him an old case to solve and limits him to ask them five questions. Nolan and Celina attempt to stop a speeding driver, Pam Winfield, but she is revealed to have a collar around her neck. The police guide Pam to a secure spot and the bomb squad attempts to remove the collar, but it detonates. Tim and Lucy discover another driver, Creighton Mitchell, also wearing a collar. However, he panics and cuts the collar off. Creighton later identifies the assailant as Richard Dormer, a colleague at an oil company they both work for. He also reveals Richard's motives stems from his sister dying in captivity abroad and the company doing nothing. The police arrest Richard at his home. His last target is the company CEO Henri Parsons, who he wants to livestream an apology. The police evacuate the company building and Nolan works to disarm Henri's collar. Henri apologizes, but Celina deduces that Richard wants to see him dead despite the apology; and instructs Nolan to correctly disarm the bomb. Chris proposes house hunting to Lucy, which takes her aback.
85	9	"Take Back"	David McWhirter	Alexi Hawley	December 4, 2022	509	3.65
Grey and his wife visit their daughter Dominique in New York but become concerned when she does not meet them and contact the NYPD, who advise that it is too soon to worry. The couple investigate and learn from her roommate that Dominique has made some possibly dubious new friends. They trace her movements, which lead to an Uber driver who appears helpful but Grey spots his taxi has a broken tail-light, a trick he taught Dominique. They follow him and rescue her from her abductors. Celina fights and apprehends a jewelry store robber, Ryan Davis. Placed in a cell, he is injured in a fight with other prisoners. He later dies in hospital of a ruptured spleen. There is an investigation to determine whether Celina or the prisoners caused his death. Nolan supports her as her union rep during questioning by Wesley and Chris. An autopsy and camera footage proves her innocence. Lucy agonizes and rehearses scenarios with Aaron for her break-up but when the time comes blurts out Tim's blunt advice and asks Chris to "hand in his playbook". Nolan assists Tim's sister, Genny, to recover her lucky-charm bracelet, thrown away by her son Tyler, furious at her divorce. Lucy breaks up with Chris and starts a relationship with Tim.
86	10	"The List"	Robert Bella	Vincent Angell	January 3, 2023	510	4.69
Tim and Lucy go out on their first date, but find themselves tackling a dispute between a cook and chef. While taking out money at a bank, Harper and James find themselves in a middle of a robbery committed by serial robber Todd Shelf and three associates. Harper has an employee trigger the silent alarm and the police arrive. Todd and Roger Armistead escape, but Todd leaves him behind. The FBI are called in, and the LAPD works with Simone Clark (Niecy Nash) and her superior/training FBI Special Agent Carter Hope (James Lesure). They track an unusual money wiring to Taylor Barnes, who reveals he hacked the FBI's undercover agents and informant list to sell to the highest bidder. Taylor is shot by a sniper before he can reveal the buyer's identity. Tim, Lucy, and their reinforcements surround Roger taking a hostage in a neighborhood. Bradford hatches a plan to distract him and Roger is subsequently arrested. At a hospital, Todd's third associate, Amy Wright, escapes and reunites with Todd. They push Tim and Aaron's patrol car off a parking garage roof, but the two narrowly escape. Shortly after, Nolan and Celina find Todd dead in the truck he and Amy stole. Note: This episode begins a crossover event that concludes on The Rookie: Feds season 1 episode 10. Niecy Nash-Betts (Simone Clarke) and James Lesure (Carter Hope) are credited as Special Guest Stars.
87	11	"The Naked and the Dead"	Chi-Yoon Chung	Steph Garcia	January 10, 2023	511	4.03
Lopez is approached by her brother Damian, who asks her to look for a kid, Mateo, gone missing from his local shelter. She and Harper take the case, and learn that Matteo was involved with a gang run by Quinlan Wright. They meet with Nolan and Celina, and search an abandoned building were Matteo's phone last pinged. They discover several bodies, including Matteo's. Harper and Lopez question Moses Warden, Quinlan's rival who denies any wrongdoing. Just then, Quinlan's men arrive and attack the workshop. Lopez and Harper have Damian bring in the gang's informant Ricky, who reveals that Elijah told him to inform the police about a drug bust. Lucy is tasked with hosting the Citizen Academy at the station. She suspects one of the attendees, Kyra Cook, is facing domestic abuse after she raises a question about it. She convinces her to go to a shelter, but she leaves it after an incident with staff. Kyra calls her again when she again faces abuse from her boyfriend Oliver. Lucy arrives at their house and arrests Oliver before Kyra holds her at gunpoint. Lucy manages to talk her down and arrest her.
88	12	"Death Notice"	Tori Garrett	Brynn Malone	January 17, 2023	512	4.78
Oscar Hutchinson has prison leave to donate a kidney to his estranged daughter, but Nolan and Celina have their hands full trying to protect the ever-manipulative Oscar – whom makes constant attempts to delay the procedure so he can stay out of prison longer – from attempts on his life by past victims of his crimes. Lopez has a tense exchange with Harper while investigating one of Elijah's associates before apologizing and admitting the stress of her unexpected pregnancy weighing on her. Tim and Lucy continue struggle to keep their budding romance from interfering with their work, especially when they're assigned to ride together for a single day, until a transfer opportunity arises for each. Ultimately Tim decides to ask for a transfer. Nolan, Celina, Tim, and Lucy end a plot to block Oscar's surgeon from performing his surgery.
89	13	"Daddy Cop"	Anne Renton	Fredrick Kotto	January 24, 2023	513	4.37
A heat wave is causing rolling blackouts across the city, but the precinct has a backup generator. Nolan's trainee Celina misses a question from Sgt. Grey, causing him to be her partner for the day. They foil a robbery in progress, and Grey puts her on command post duty. She is overwhelmed, but the assignment was meant to teach her to ask for help, which she does when she can't get in contact with her mother. When the backup generator at the station fails to come on, Nolan and Aaron discover two people pretending to be cops to try and break a friend out of jail. They rat on a ghost gun seller who Lopez takes down in an undercover operation. The gun seller rolls on a fentanyl dealer processing raw product in a home. Surveillance shows there to be a child in the building. Celina is exposed while rescuing her, but resuscitated by a dose of Narcan. Lucy sets dominoes in motion to get Tim transferred to Metro, back on the street where he belongs. Celina carefully checks in with her mother from the hospital, who thinks she only does desk duty. A side story has most of the cast spending time at Nolan's, who installed a backup generator and has air conditioning.
90	14	"Death Sentence"	Faye Brenner	Diana Mendez Boucher	January 31, 2023	514	4.77
Tim starts work with Metro and experiences some initial setbacks during training, but eventually proves himself and is welcomed to his team. Bailey is in an ambulance that gets shot at, the start of a rage killing spree of firefighters and EMT workers. Nolan finds the perpetrator and arrests a fired firefighter. Wesley loses a routine preliminary decision related to Elijah, which makes him suspect that the judge working the case, Rivas, is on the take. He confronts Judge Rivas, who hints at the truth and then dies mysteriously of a heart attack. Wesley warns Monica that Elijah could be targeting her next. Tamara is working multiple jobs to try and move out of Lucy's place to give Lucy and Tim privacy. The parents at her babysitting gig act strangely, leading to the police investigating the mother's kidnapping due to the father's illegal activity. Tim participates in the rescue as part of Metro. Over the course of his day, Nolan receives calls from his mother, who wants to be paid for staying away from his wedding. He looks away from her "tricks", assuming that a doctor calling him is a fake sent by her, until finally learning that she died in the hospital.
91	15	"The Con"	Bill Roe	Leland Jay Anderson	February 14, 2023	515	4.10
With help from Matthew Garza's team at the FBI, Lopez puts everything on the line to help Elijah Stone take down Abril Rodas in exchange for her safety as part of an elaborate operation. Garza's team moves to utilize Abril's girlfriend Daylin as bait for Elijah. But the night he arrives to execute her, he withdraws at the last minute due to an unintended distraction caused by Aaron. Unbeknown to both the LAPD and FBI, Elijah approaches Abril and offers to work with her. Nolan and Bailey travel to Nolan's mother's now-vacant home in Foxburg, Pennsylvania, and must deal with the secrets and shady dealings his late mother left behind including someone masquerading as Nolan, drug dealers, and a foreclosed mortgage.: Britt Robertson (Laura Stenson), Felix Solis (Matthew Garza) and Kevin Zegers (Brendon Acres) are credited as Special Guest Stars.
92	16	"Exposed"	Ryan Krayser	Paula Puryear	February 21, 2023	516	4.15
The Mid-Wilshire station works with Victorville PD detective Noah Foster to stop a militia group from using sarin gas in a terrorist attack in the city. When a member of the militia turns up dead due to the gas, they bring in his sister for more info, but she plays dumb. However, a tap on her phone reveals that the group is targeting Union Station. A road block with spike strips is set up while Aaron and Harper force the truck with sarin gas towards it. Blocking the truck in, they order the driver out and arrest him. Bailey, Celina, and Harper work with the CDC to secure and quarantine three men returning from Nigeria who are suspected to be exposed to Ebola. Though all of them cooperate, the third forces an entire bus into quarantine due to potential exposure. Lucy detects animosity from Tim, which she learns is due to him learning that she was behind his transfer to Metro. She convinces him that it was the best move, despite not informing him beforehand. Lopez and Wesley increase their residential security by hiring a private security specialist. They receive a Valentine's Day "gift" from Elijah Stone – dead roses crawling with insects.
93	17	"The Enemy Within"	Lanre Olabisi	Vincent Angell	February 28, 2023	517	4.11
Elijah begins to question Monica's loyalty, but is convinced after she forms a plan to double play the LAPD on his trail. She approaches them under the guise of finally helping, but Grey and Harper quickly deduce her play. The second time Monica reports on Elijah's moves, the police manage to decode the real location at the Port of Los Angeles. A shootout ensues and Elijah subdues Harper, but Lopez wounds him and she and Harper arrest him. After Harper allows her to leave, Monica secretly contacts Abril and offers her assistance. Nolan re-opens Celina's sister Blanca's case, and with Celina discovers a new lead which fractures their mother's previous alibi. Nolan learns from a witness, that she and Celina's mother were taking opioids together while Blanca and Celina were left home alone, during which Blanca disappeared. Her mother is eventually brought in for questioning, and admits the truth to Celina. Note: This episode begins a crossover event that concludes on The Rookie: Feds season 1 episode 17.
94	18	"Double Trouble"	Jon Huertas	Caroline Bible & Glen Mazzara	March 21, 2023	518	3.95
Tim's look-alike Jake "Dim" Butler is out of prison, so he and his girlfriend Sava "Juicy" Wu go on a new crime spree. Their plan is to take jobs such as handyman or nanny for a rich and/or famous family, then steal from the family. After an initial score on Lance Bass, they move on to the Baudelaire family with a stash of very expensive and often illegal antiquities in a secret room. Dim goes missing and is later found dead, while the family's nanny is also found dead in their garden house. Mid-Wilshire question one of their previous handymen, who admits that had accidentally killed the nanny. Juicy receives threats from Turkish dealer, who the CIA had connected with an Iranian weapons deal. A video from Dim and Juicy's stolen car leads the police to her friend Lisa Miller, who Dim had an affair with and, when he broke it off, she took a historic gun from the Baudelaires and killed him. Nolan is shot during her arrest, but survived thanks to his bullet-proof vest. The story is told as an in-work documentary, with character interviews interspersing the action.
95	19	"A Hole in the World"	T.K. Shom	Brynn Malone	March 28, 2023	519	4.47
Celina visits her sister Blanca's grave on the anniversary of her abduction. Lopez finds that the abduction fits a pattern of cases dating back years before. Nolan and Celina get a call about a missing girl. An older officer, Joel Chambers, shows up at the scene who Celina recognizes from her case, and he makes Nolan suspicious by asking to enter the scene. Grey asks an old investigator about anything that did not make it into Blanca's kidnapping, which leads the team to a serial sex offender unable to be tied to the case. Harper asks Joel about details in the Juarez case, and he is caught in a lie. They release him with Tim following him, but he flees. Lucy finds a recent case Joel worked on where he cleared a house of squatters just a couple miles from the abduction. The team surrounds the house and talks Joel into letting the girl go, but when the team moves in, Joel raises his gun against Tim, who is forced to shoot him. Lucy offers to help Tim get through the experience, and he offers to help her study for her detective exam.
96	20	"S.T.R."	C. Chi-Yoon Chung	Natalie Callaghan	April 18, 2023	520	3.61
Tim's ex Isabel approaches him, asking for assistance in finding a missing girl, Dara Teska, whom she looked after during a past assignment. Together with Lucy, they determine that Dara went into hiding in a motel Isabel used to bring her to for safety. Upon securing Dara, Isabel and Lucy are forced to reveal their identities in order to help her escape hitman sent by her uncle. After securing her, they learn that her father, Frank, had her uncle killed, and Isabel promises to stay in touch. Grey assigns Aaron to assist Lopez during her day due to her second pregnancy. Harper and Nolan assist Skip Tracer Randy when he stumbles upon a dead body. Randy deduces that a friend of his with prior history has been threatening him through emojis, and he decides to confront him in order for Nolan and Harper to arrest him. Meanwhile, Bailey's friend from college, Libby, is dragging her around L.A. in an attempt to relive their college days, culminating in a meet-up with an untrustworthy man that leads to Bailey's arrest when she gets into a fight with him. Libby decides to return home, but not before accusing Bailey of being an alcoholic.
97	21	"Going Under"	Anne Renton	Alexi Hawley & Brynn Malone	April 25, 2023	521	3.55
Lucy goes undercover as a sales agent in order to gain Frank Teska's interest following his release from prison. Once Frank approaches her, he learns that his brother's crew is after him, while some of his own men have also turned on him. After a drive-by shooting, he determines a close associate was behind it, but Lucy stops Frank from killing him as Tim and the police descend on their location. Frank concedes that he has lost control over his crew after his prison time and wishes to reconcile with his daughter, which Lucy encourages him to do. Aaron assists Lopez with detective work while she is at home, and questions a witness of a robbery, which leads to a vehicle with a dead body and workshop with a deceased suspect. He manages to solve the case in addition to seven other tie-ins. Harper, Nolan and Celina tackle a cold case favor which involves a severed torso. A search recovers an arm belonging to it and two friends of the victim. Video footage in their possession reveals that they accidentally shot their friend while recording a video and tried to cover it up. Note: This episode begins a crossover event that concludes on The Rookie: Feds season 1 episode 21.
98	22	"Under Siege"	Bill Roe	Alexi Hawley	May 2, 2023	522	4.33
Aaron and Celina are ambushed by masked assailants after investigating a suspected disturbance, and are seriously wounded. When hospitalized, Celina recounts a riddle to Nolan said to her by one of the assailants. Mid-Wilshire is put on high alert, and even further when Nolan and Bailey are attacked and Harper's child is temporarily abducted. Lopez works with Wesley and Luna Grey in deducing the riddle. The police look into past run-ins, identifying one with a prior record and finding him dead in his boobytrapped house. They further narrow his possible prison encounters, with Tim and Lucy visiting Luke Moran. An army of masked men with police shields pursue them, but they're swiftly taken out with reinforcements on-scene. With Luke caught and surrounded, he chooses to try to fight back before being shot down. As further reinforcements roll in, an unknown man in a passing vehicle praises how well Luke served as a distraction.

=== Season 6 (2024) ===
No. overall	No. in season	Title	Directed by	Written by	Original release date	Prod. code	U.S. viewers (millions)
99	1	"Strike Back"	Bill Roe	Alexi Hawley	February 20, 2024	601	3.77
Following Luke Moran's death, the Mid-Wilshire officers learn that his attack was a diversion for a professional crew to rob the Federal Reserve Bank. Nolan and the others arrive at the bank and a shootout ensues, forcing the criminals to sacrifice three of their own to stall for time to escape. Six weeks later, one of the surviving thieves is hospitalized following a car crash and is killed while attempting to murder a nurse. A search of his rental house turns up a phone which leads them to the remaining crew, all of whom are arrested after a shootout at the airport. Lucy is studying for her detective exam and asks Tim to challenge her with outside the box tests. She makes a mistake that compromises evidence in a murder. Her self-doubt causes her to question Tim's motives. Aaron returns to duty following his shooting and is assigned to desk duty until the department psychiatrist, Dr. Blair London, signs off on him. Boyd, the leader of the crew, takes a deal with defense attorney Monica Stevens following his interrogation but is killed by a sniper (implied to have been sent by Monica) while en route to jail.
100	2	"The Hammer"	Alexi Hawley	Alexi Hawley & Brynn Malone	February 27, 2024	602	3.29
Nolan and Bailey's wedding day is just one day away, but first must contend with a seemingly endless stream of disasters, including a lawsuit against Nolan by Oscar Hutchinson. Skip Tracer Randy accidentally pawns Bailey's ring, and Tim and Lucy go to retrieve it from a known criminal called "The Hammer", who has a penchant for fighting. The two also take time to address their own fight over Lucy becoming an undercover detective, which Tim discovers he has more reservations over than he thought. Celina and Harper discover a heroin smuggling ring disguised as a pottery dealer and Celina uses it to try and land her first case. Grey ends up officiating when the minister gets stuck in traffic and the ceremony goes off well, with Randy filling in as DJ. Tim and Lucy agree to work through their issues, but Aaron is gently rebuffed when he tries to kiss Celina and gets drunk as a result. Celina goes to meet an informant and is kidnapped leading the rest of the team to come to her rescue.
101	3	"Trouble in Paradise"	TK Shom	Madeleine Coghlan & Glen Mazzara	March 5, 2024	603	3.49
Nolan and Bailey's secluded getaway honeymoon turns into an active crime scene when their housekeeper washes up dead on the beach. They suspect a bandaged loner also staying at the resort of being the killer and all efforts to escape and get help prove fruitless before they are abducted. Harper and Lopez join them as backup and use footage from Nolan's cameras to track them down, arriving just as he escapes and subdues the suspect. Celina is assigned to Tim in Nolan's absence while she also struggling with Aaron's kiss, and he struggles with his own feelings. Lucy continues to prepare for the detectives' exam and Tim cautions her about overpreparing. They and Celina soon get caught up trying to identify an amnesiac shoplifter. Lucy takes her detectives' exam, while Tim and Celina follow a lead and find the shoplifter's partner stuck in a wall, having got stuck during an attempted heist. Aaron and Celina mend their friendship and Lucy passes her exam but ranks low. Nolan and Bailey salvage their honeymoon by having a relaxing staycation back at home.
102	4	"Training Day"	Tori Garrett	Fredrick Kotto & Natalie Callaghan	March 26, 2024	604	3.06
Aaron is cleared to return to duty and undergoes tests with Tim to see if he can still overcome the workload. Aaron decides to be more thorough in the case they are given but is frustrated when it comes to an unexpected end, with the husband of a woman supplying a criminal with money, ends up dead in prison. Furthermore, the wife is revealed to have ordered his death due to his history of abuse. Nolan and Celina respond to a dead body discovery, which they soon learn could be another victim of the long-lost Pentagram killer. The case takes a turn when they learn that the victim was disliked at her school, and a man escapes after witnessing his wife being killed at his home. The victim's brother is revealed to be responsible when he shoots up the recovery scene, and Lucy is injured. Despite this she faces the brother solo, who she later learns survived his injuries, meaning that she will potentially be witnessing against him.
103	5	"The Vow"	C. Chi-Yoon Chung	Vincent Angell & Diana Mendez Boucher	April 2, 2024	605	3.40
Tim calls off a date night with Lucy, to meet a former army friend, Mark Greer, to discuss plans to eliminate Ray Watkins, who once betrayed them in the past. But he finds himself unable to go through with the mission after confronting Ray, deciding to take all the heat if Ray ever strikes back, with Mark ditching the plan shortly after. Nolan and Celina respond to a murder of a family, with only a mother and her toddler daughter surviving. However, the mother later dies in hospital and Nolan suggests he and Bailey could take care of the toddler until either relatives or a foster family is found. Bailey worries about taking care of the toddler due to past trauma looking after a neighbor's child. Harper and Lopez lead the investigation into the family's death and learn from their tenant that a coworker of the father became vengeful over a lottery ticket. A shootout ensues at the coworker's residence before a swift arrest. Meanwhile, Aaron encounters Blair at a bar, and she takes an apparent liking to him, but later denies it at a meeting. Nolan and Bailey decide to adopt the family's toddler, but are disappointed when her uncle arrives to take care of her instead.
104	6	"Secrets and Lies"	Bill Roe	Elizabeth Davis Beall & Leland Jay Anderson	April 9, 2024	606	3.31
Lopez inquiries into the nature of Tim's secrecy after learning about Lucy's worries. Eventually Tim comes clean to them after Ray visits Lucy's home. The trio determine that he is a gun for hire just as he abducts a Venezuelan activist, which they manage to stop, and an IA investigation is launched. The investigation, during which Tim lies to Percy West, the late Jackson West's father, clears him of any wrongdoing against Ray, but internal ramifications await. Additionally, Tim decides to break up with Lucy. Nolan and Celina track an escaped inmate from a community event, learning that she sought retaliation against whoever cheated with her boyfriend, surprisingly revealed to be her own mother. A bag from the same event leads Harper and Aaron to reopen the investigation into Karina Lewis' murder, which they gradually determine had a false confession and murder weapon. After pinpointing the gun's make, model, residue and owner, ADA Del Monte reverses the original verdict in favor of the new evidence. Bailey is more determined to have a baby, but Nolan is hesitant, citing his old age and work schedule, but eventually decides in favor of having another baby.
105	7	"Crushed"	Tori Garrett	Brynn Malone & Natalie Callaghan	April 30, 2024	607	3.72
Tim is demoted and placed back on patrol. He also receives a psychological evaluation from Blair, who concludes that he still is fit for duty. Meanwhile, Nolan and Celina track down a man who had an affair with his babysitter. They and the others later learn that the babysitter's friend also was kidnapped alongside her, but later find her dead in a parking garage. The babysitter later manages to escape, and they find the man dead in his car. En route to the hospital, the babysitter escapes and wields a knife at police. She reveals that she is pregnant and had killed the man when he broke things off and abused her, as well as her friend when she wanted to call the police about the murder. Tim decides to go to therapy despite Blair's positive conclusion. As Tamara moves out, Celina asks Lucy if she can become her new roommate, which she accepts. Harper and Lopez share babysitter advice and vet a new babysitter, which they ultimately decide to share, with her taking care of both of their children when required.
106	8	"Punch Card"	Lanre Olabisi	Vincent Angell & Fredrick Kotto	May 7, 2024	608	2.87
Tim and Aaron are placed on watch duty for a Metro raid. Meanwhile, the LAPD has to handle a massive gang war between the Eastern Front and a rival gang that finds its way to the hospital. After repeatedly intervening to help, Nolan and Bailey eventually get to their doctor's appointment and learn that she can't bear children. Although IVF is suggested as a solution, Bailey decides against it. The SWAT raid is compromised and an officer is left paralyzed. Tim suspects "Mad Dog", the leader of the Metro team, is a mole and confronts him on a rooftop. Mad Dog confesses to his suspicions and commits suicide, but not before giving Tim a tiny hint. Celina moves in with Lucy, and shortly afterwards receives a birthday card from Tim. Monica Stevens is assaulted by a professional hitman in her home. The hitman is killed by Monica in the hospital, and it is also implied that Monica is working with Blair and Mad Dog. Meanwhile, Harper and Lopez both suspect Monica in the hitman's death, which they currently cannot prove.
107	9	"The Squeeze"	Michael Goi	Diana Mendez Boucher & Leland Jay Anderson	May 14, 2024	609	2.98
IA investigates the suspicious circumstances surrounding Mad Dog's death, but Tim finds himself being tainted by the IA investigator Pearson, who it is implied has a vendetta against him and is later revealed to be working for Blair. Nolan and Celina secretly investigate Blair and later turn to Smitty, asking him to keep an eye on her comings and goings and her patients. Monica investigates who might be looking to kill her, which leads her to the city's money laundering top criminal, Christian Batista. Concurrently, Lucy goes undercover as a new babysitter at the Batista home after Harper and Lopez learn that their babysitter formerly worked for Christian, and his enforcer shows up at Lopez's home. Nolan confronts Blair with evidence from Mad Dog's flat that implicates her, and she eventually agrees to testify in exchange for immunity. A lead from a computer search leads Grey, Harper and Lopez to proof that Pearson was in on the conspiracy. Monica tracks down her attackers and learns that they were hired by Eric Ramsey. In exchange for assistance against Ramsey, she agrees to help Oscar Hutchinson escape prison.
108	10	"Escape Plan"	Bill Roe	Alexi Hawley	May 21, 2024	610	3.14
Nolan and Harper team up with Garza and his FBI team to uncover the conspiracy. Monica's hit crew starts killing any witnesses against her, which includes Pearson, before later capturing Blair. Christian's men attempt to kill the hired gun Gundo after he double-crosses Monica and she tips Christian off, but are thwarted by Tim, Lucy, and Lopez. Monica makes plans of her own for revenge against Ramsey, in which, after confronting him, she resorts to blackmail against him over an affair he had with the wife of Swiss businessman Jakob Olmstead. She takes Blair to Argentina, and reveals her plans to reel Jakob over to her side against Ramsey. Nolan and Harper rescue Blair in Argentina with the assistance of the CIA and FBI, but Nolan is injured during the rescue, which allows Monica to escape. Garza ensures that an Interpol warrant is placed on Monica. Tim apologizes to Lucy, lets her know he will always hold her kindness and repay as much as he can. Oscar and Jason Wyler, Bailey's psychologically abusive ex-husband, break out of prison. Grey contacts Nolan while he and Bailey are talking about adoption, letting them know that Oscar and Jason have escaped.

=== Season 7 (2025) ===
No. overall	No. in season	Title	Directed by	Written by	Original release date	Prod. code	U.S. viewers (millions)
109	1	"The Shot"	Alexi Hawley	Alexi Hawley	January 7, 2025	701	3.41
The LAPD and SWAT raid a house searching for Jason Wyler and Oscar Hutchinson but instead encounter four unrelated criminals, leading to a shootout and a foot pursuit involving Tim, Lucy, Celina and Nolan. While all four suspects are arrested, Jason and Oscar remain at large. Celina reveals that Aaron Thorsen transferred to another division due to Blair London's crimes. Lucy is temporarily promoted to P3 and begins training rookie Seth Ridley, while Tim trains rookie Miles Penn. Celina and Nolan witness a pharmacy robbery, but Nolan's failure to take a shot results in a civilian's death. Lucy and Tim make a bet over whose rookie would perform better. Seth later contaminates a crime scene by vomiting after discovering a pharmacy robber from earlier who had overdosed. However, he later reveals it was due to a memory of seeing his high school girlfriend overdose. Meanwhile, Miles's arrogance causes friction during training. The LAPD and FBI team up and cautiously pursue criminals transporting a nuclear device. The chase ends with Nolan successfully neutralizing a suspect, redeeming himself. Back home, Nolan reflects on the absence of Bailey who is out of the country due to the threat of Oscar and Jason. It is also revealed that Miles is homeless and living out of his car.
110	2	"The Watcher"	Bill Roe	Natalie Callaghan	January 14, 2025	702	3.45
Celina and Nolan pursue a suspect who was handcuffed by a masked vigilante known as "The Watcher". Celina begins her plainclothes day. Seth is late to roll call and tells Lucy that he's a cancer survivor and his tardiness was due to a doctor's appointment. Tim discovers Miles living in a car and warns him to find housing within 24 hours or face expulsion from the LAPD. Harper and Lopez temporarily return to patrol. Lucy and Seth encounter a man shot by the masked vigilante, but Seth fails to note key details, leading to a reprimand by Lieutenant Grey. Celina and Nolan respond to a home invasion where an elderly man accidentally and nonfatally shot his granddaughter, mistaking her for an intruder. There is tension between Celina and Nolan over leadership during Celina's plainclothes day. Harper, Lopez, Tim, and Miles devise a plan and capture the Watcher, only to discover that he is not the real shooter. The entire team converges on the shooter's house, where they apprehend the shooter and members of the "6th Street Devils" gang who stormed the property. Nolan later visits the traumatized grandfather in the hospital, and Miles moves in with Smitty in his RV.
111	3	"Out of Pocket"	Tessa Blake	Jenny Lynn	January 21, 2025	703	3.34
Nolan arms his house with a security system, anticipating a break-in from Jason. The alarm goes off because of a woman who accidentally wandered onto Nolan's property. Wesley listens to tapes from Blair's sessions, discovering that Detective Keith Graham has fantasies about Angela. Grey finds out that Tim and Lucy have been betting on their rookies, causing him to swap them. Rachel returns from New York after losing her job and moves in with Lucy. Nolan and Celina look for clues to find Jason. A suspect holds a woman hostage in her house. Miles and Seth, despite orders not to, go in and arrest the suspect. They are lauded as heroes on social media and avoid being fired due to the department trying to reform its image. Wesley, James, Harper, and Lopez have dinner together, which ends in a heated argument about the justice system. It is revealed that Jason is wanted dead by other criminals, but Nolan wants to arrest Jason as part of his morality; he spends the night following a hitman named Malvado, who plans to murder Jason. The rest of the team finds Nolan, but Malvado escapes. Bailey returns home early, much to Nolan's surprise.
112	4	"Darkness Falling"	John Hyams	Madeleine Coghlan	January 28, 2025	704	2.56
Celina and Bailey swap houses to confuse Jason, while Wesley returns to the D.A.'s office and confides in Del Monte about his discomfort with Graham's crush on Lopez. Seth reveals to Miles that his girlfriend died in a car crash, raising Lucy's suspicions. Nolan discovers a live body in a car trunk linked to Harrison Novak, a serial killer. The LAPD tracks and arrests Novak, taking custody of several bodies. Bailey realizes Malvado is following her, and questions him. He claims he is searching for Jason, giving her his untraceable number. During questioning, Novak insists that half of the bodies are not his, revealing that he has a copycat—someone he grew up with in a psychiatric ward. Lopez and Harper investigate the facility but find nothing. They notice a neighboring building with the same green tarp used to bury the victims. In the basement, Harper is injected with an unknown substance by the copycat, leaving her temporarily unable to feel her legs. Backup and LAPD officers arrive, securing the scene and rushing Harper to safety. Grey informs Nolan that Jason has been heading east. Bailey moves back in with Nolan but secretly keeps Malvado's number.
113	5	"Til Death"	Jennifer Lynch	Nick Hurwitz	February 4, 2025	705	2.55
Seth confesses to Lucy that the two stories he told were both lies, and that he will try not to lie anymore. Nolan and Celina apprehend Ryan Dearbourne, who is suspected to be the copycat, but Harper suspects vending machine supplier Liam Glasser, even when Ryan confesses. Harper later confirms Glasser's connection to the murders and lets him know that she will arrest him eventually. Bailey, meanwhile, calls Malvado and informs him about Jason. It is revealed that Jason paid someone to plant his fingerprints east, and the woman who wandered onto Nolan's property is Jason's partner. Jason kidnaps Bailey, but she fights back, forcing him and his partner to flee. Malvado and Nolan separately follow them, with Malvado shooting Jason's partner with a sniper rifle. As Nolan corners Jason, Malvado assassinates Jason and escapes. Lucy decides to remove Seth from the LAPD, but before she can speak to Grey, Seth reveals that his cancer has returned. Miles's long-distance girlfriend Camilla surprises him and moves to LA. Nolan visits Bailey in the hospital to take her home but discovers Malvado's burner phone and that Bailey texted him.
114	6	"The Gala"	Lanre Olabisi	Moira Kirland	February 11, 2025	706	2.77
On Valentine's Day, Tim and Lucy are partnered up in an event where people can report their exes for criminal behavior. A woman reports her ex, and Tim and Lucy arrest him. The man refuses to report his ex-girlfriend out of love. Meanwhile, Nolan and Celina investigate a case with a missing girl, learning that she was dating the daughter of a criminal and attempted to help her escape. However, the father of the missing girl confronts the criminal, resulting in the police saving the girls and arresting the criminal. At the charity gala, Lopez and Wesley set up Graham with one of Wesley's friends, while James introduces Harper to his friend, Anita, and her husband, Teddy. Teddy is revealed to be an abusive alcoholic and hits Anita. While breaking up the fight, Tim is injured. Lucy helps Tim dress his wound, and the two end up having sex but later agree not to do it again. Nolan privately confronts Bailey about Malvado, leading to an argument where Bailey breaks the burner phone and storms out angrily, refusing to talk to him. Camilla breaks up with Miles due to not feeling like she fits in with his new life.
115	7	"The Mickey"	Tara Miele	Amanda Mercedes	February 18, 2025	707	3.31
Tim and Miles respond to a call of a man trying to break into a women's shelter. Diana, a worker at the shelter, is injured in the scuffle and connects with Bailey, who tackled the man. Miles threatens the man and is reprimanded by Tim, but the two also share a positive connection when Miles reveals to Tim that he worked on a domestic violence case in Texas where the victim died, and Tim supports him emotionally. On Celina's final day as Nolan's rookie, their car gets stolen by the Hammer and his partner, Mickey Barnes, but both criminals are caught and decide to do a deal to rat out a higher-up criminal. Mickey betrays the deal by holding Tim hostage, but Hammer redeems himself by stopping Mickey. Lucy is hesitant to trust Seth due to his history of dishonesty. She allows him to be part of an undercover operation as Tamara's boyfriend, which nearly goes awry when Seth deviates from the plan. Seth and Tamara develop an interest in each other. Bailey confronts her past trauma, with help from Diana, and recognizes the extent of the psychological abuse she endured in her relationship with Jason.
116	8	"Wildfire"	Michael Goi	Brynn Malone	February 25, 2025	708	3.12
A wildfire breaks out in Los Angeles, creating chaos. Harper continues her pursuit of suspected serial killer Liam Glasser, watching him personally after official surveillance is reduced. As the Glasser family evacuates, she searches his home but finds nothing. Glasser uses the chaos to abduct a homeless man but is ultimately caught with help from his wife and son, who realize his guilt. Tim and Lucy become trapped in a fire due to Seth's failure to report a road closure. Taking shelter under a fireproof blanket, Tim confesses his love, and Lucy acknowledges her feelings but highlights the fact that Tim is her superior, and therefore, they cannot be in a relationship. Later, Lucy considers the sergeant's exam. Seth tries to cover up his mistake, but Tim and Lucy are suspicious. At a community shelter, James breaks up a dispute with a woman named Kylie, who unexpectedly kisses him. He reaffirms his commitment to Harper, unaware that Nolan is looking. Later, a Sixth Street Devils member hunting Kylie attacks the shelter in a drive-by shooting, gravely wounding both her and James.
117	9	"The Kiss"	Bill Roe	Elizabeth Davis Beall & Fredrick Kotto	March 11, 2025	709	3.29
Immediately following the shooting, Celina calls for an ambulance to take Kylie and James to the hospital. There, Nolan meets up with Bailey, who faints due to dehydration. The shooter is identified as a man named Connor, with Tim and Lucy attempting to pursue him, only for Connor to escape after striking a rich elderly woman with his car. The dying woman's maid and daughter fight over the woman's money, with Tim and Lucy having to stop the maid from stealing the woman's ring. Meanwhile, Wesley brings up the kiss between James and Kylie to Grey, resulting in a search of Harper's house, where they find a photo of James and a fugitive at the house. ADA Vivian, who has a grudge against Grey, interrogates Harper without his permission and threatens Grey into putting Harper on admin leave. Nolan manages to prove the fugitive's innocence by searching through the case files and arresting the real culprit. Later, he, Tim, and Lucy manage to arrest Connor. James wakes up and tells Harper everything, reaffirming his commitment to her, while Kylie is also expected to survive due to Celina's quick thinking. Bailey helps Celina arrest two men who robbed a meth lab.
118	10	"Chaos Agent"	Tasha Smith	Alexi Hawley	March 18, 2025	710	3.27
A typical day at Mid-Wilshire starts innocently enough with Miles being assigned to track and capture a raccoon in the station and with Celina assisting her new boyfriend Rodge in locating his stolen music equipment. Things soon turn hectic, though, with Nolan and Lucy investigating three teenage girls who were stabbed in a local park while the rest of the station has to deal with a group of inmates being housed at Mid-Wilshire while their prison deals with a riot, a situation that is complicated further by a computer system outage and, later, a power outage. Nolan and Lucy, assisted by Lopez and Wesley, soon learn that two of the girls were prompted into attacking the third girl, who was bullying them, by an advanced AI chatbot, which soon becomes fixated with Nolan. Meanwhile, Lucy suspects that Seth is lying about his cancer diagnosis, and Luna reveals his oncologist is a habitual disciplinary problem for the hospital. Lucy, Tim, and Grey later confront Seth and request a blood test to verify his cancer diagnosis. Seth refuses and is promptly fired, but not before threatening a lawsuit against the department.
119	11	"Speed"	Daryn Okada	Natalie Callaghan	March 25, 2025	711	3.72
Celina and Nolan go undercover as civilians on the bus as part of the LAPD's crackdown on transit crime. Celina is excited as this is her first undercover assignment. Things quickly take a turn when two brothers take the bus hostage with a bomb and demand access to a cryptowallet in government custody. One brother gets shot in a scuffle, leading to Nolan and Celina trying to convince the other brother to allow them to go to the hospital. When he refuses, SWAT gets Bailey on the bus to help. Eventually, Nolan is able to subdue the brother and save everyone on the bus. Meanwhile, Lopez and Harper go check out a house connected to the brothers only to find it booby trapped. When they run down leads on who may have set the trap, they tie it back to a woman who was posing as pregnant on the bus, and arrest her. Unbeknownst to them, the woman stole a government employee's secure data card for Monica Stevens, who is threatening her child's life in exchange for her silence. Miles has to raise $10,000 quickly to pay back his ex-girlfriend's father, and the only way to do so is to sell his college championship ring, which he does after a talk with Grey.
120	12	"April Fools"	Ryan Krayser	Amanda Mercedes	April 1, 2025	713	3.27
Lucy and Tim decide to use April Fool's Day as an excuse to hook up. Nolan is assigned a rookie, Connor Craig, who is one month away from completing the program but is underqualified. While on a domestic violence case involving Teddy and Anita, Connor gets injured and Nolan confronts Connor's previous T.O. The T.O. reveals that he put in very little effort training Connor. Wesley is assigned a case that is going to trial the next day and has to quickly decide what to do about it, and it raises Lopez's and Harper's suspicions. It is eventually revealed that the investigating detective is the one responsible for the murder. Tim clashes with the station's social media intern Livy, who makes several posts people mistake as real. When Tim notifies Livy that she has been fired, she retaliates by posting that all crime is legal for the next few hours, inciting a riot across the district which the LAPD is forced to stop, arresting Livy. Teddy is revealed to have been killed, and Connor safely retrieves evidence implicating Anita in the crime. Grey allows Connor to stay in the program but has him transferred to a quieter division.
121	13	"Three Billboards"	Gina Lamar	Aleks Biskis & Chelsea Urech	April 8, 2025	712	3.21
Nolan and Bailey are trying to adopt a baby, but Nolan spots a billboard accusing him as a dirty cop. On patrol, Lucy and Nolan stop a car with expired plates but witness a bombing. When Celina arrives at the suspected bomber's house, she enters the house, and sees someone getting tortured, but the suspect flees. Nolan and Lucy arrive to support Celina, but are unable to help when they have to take cover from another bombing. The victim reveals to Lopez and Harper that the bomber killed his accomplice when he refused to rob a celebrity's home. Miles meets a childhood friend who is a famous football player and attends his party, but notices his friend's assistant steal valuables. He also spots Rachel, Lucy's friend, and gets caught up in a gunfight. Lucy, Celina and Rodge arrive to assist Miles. Further posters are seen accusing Nolan, Harper and Lopez of being dirty. Nolan and Bailey meet with the social worker, who indicates that adoption is unlikely. It is revealed that Liam Glasser was responsible for the billboards. Nolan and Bailey decide to mentor children at James' community center.
122	14	"Mad About Murder"	Dinh Thai	Madeleine Coghlan	April 15, 2025	714	2.97
While pulling traffic cams, Nolan identifies a civilian as Malvado. The FBI reveals that they have linked the murders to a hitman site and they have arrested a couple connected to it. The boyfriend quickly breaks and reveals that it is a scam. Nolan reveals to Bailey that Malvado is back and she fears that if he was caught that he would try to use her contact with him as a form of leverage. LAPD and the FBI go to a golf course, anticipating that Malvado would attempt to go after Mitch Yancy, a wealthy client. They arrest Mitch and find Malvado on a roof of a country club. He flees and is chased by Nolan and Tim, overpowering both officers until he is confronted by Lopez. He tries to shoot her with a hidden gun but she shoots him dead. Meanwhile, Celina and Lucy investigate a missing woman and her baby, discovering that she was kidnapped by a deranged woman, and manage to save both her and the baby. Tim agrees to help Miles record new training videos in exchange for the latter helping the LAPD win the flag football game against the LAFD.
123	15	"A Deadly Secret"	Ashley Williams	Nick Hurwitz	April 22, 2025	715	2.83
In another documentary, the Mid-Wilshire officers and their friends and family recount the tale of Henry's ex-fiancee Abigail as she goes missing investigating the case of the Westview Psychiatric Hospital. Despite numerous people, including Shane Madej and Ryan Bergara, attempting to prove the abandoned facility is haunted, Nolan and Celina instead discover a vast criminal conspiracy involving mind altering drugs and wealthy patients. They also discover an unharmed Abigail, who had been trapped in the facility when she fell through the floor, and she provides further insight on the case while trying to produce her own documentary on the facility. It is revealed that the hospital director is the one responsible for the crimes, and the LAPD arrest her, with Abigail able to successfully finish her documentary. Meanwhile, during their investigation of the facility, Tim and Lucy are accidentally dosed with truth serum and have an honest conversation about their breakup and Lucy lets slip that she has forgiven Tim.
124	16	"The Return"	John Terlesky	Moira Kirland	April 29, 2025	716	2.84
Seth Ridley successfully sues to get reinstated to the FTO program but is shunned by his fellow officers, particularly Lucy and Miles. Nolan is assigned as his new T.O. and they get called to a silent alarm where a civilian talks down the robber. However, that civilian is revealed to have been released erroneously from a Nevada prison with five years remaining on his sentence. When Nolan and Seth arrive to take him into custody, he runs. Meanwhile, Tim and Miles arrest a social media influencer who was livestreaming his reckless driving. He uses his internet fame to turn his followers against Wesley and Angela. Angela and Nyla confront the influencer's girlfriend, who leaks a video of him insulting his most loyal fans. When Nolan and Seth follow the civilian's wife to two known criminals, the latter gets shot in the leg while saving the former. Seth's leg is amputated and Nolan advises he take the opportunity to become a better person. The civilian is later cleared of charges and set free. Seth comes clean to Tamara about his lies and she breaks up with him. Lucy finally takes her sergeant's exam, so she and Tim contemplate what's next for them if she passes.
125	17	"Mutiny and the Bounty"	Rob Seidenglanz	Brynn Malone	May 6, 2025	717	3.11
Skip Tracer Randy turns up at John Nolan's house and reveals that he has gotten rich off crypto. He wants to use that newfound wealth to marry Pete Nolan's girlfriend, Chastity. When Randy proposes, she turns him down but allows him to be her sugar daddy. However, criminals kidnap Chastity, demanding a ransom. Randy accidentally makes the situation worse by paying the initial ransom and making an announcement to have vigilantes arrest the criminals. Chastity escapes, and Nolan and the others arrest the criminals. Randy accidentally forgets his crypto wallet password, but remains on good terms with Chastity. Meanwhile, Angela and Nyla help their mothers catch a woman who has frauded other women out of their houses. Also, while on a case, Wesley learns that Sean Del Monte's son has been involved with drug dealers. Wesley convinces Sean to stand up and put his son in rehab, but criminals attack. Sean holds off the criminals long enough for the LAPD to arrive, and later informs Wesley that he will be dropping out of the DA race. Lucy learns that she had the highest score in the sergeant's exam, but is being transferred to night shift due to her promotion.
126	18	"The Good, the Bad, and the Oscar"	Bill Roe	Alexi Hawley	May 13, 2025	718	3.02
Lucy starts her new job as the supervising sergeant in the night shift and has trouble adjusting. Miles includes his profession as part of his dating app profile. He goes out with a girl who is the sister of a gang member. He evades the criminals and is saved by Lucy. Angela deals with a man who robbed a bank in order to give money to an AI-generated woman he met online. It is revealed the man's wife is trying to catfish him. Nolan and Harper track Oscar to a motel. Oscar spots Nolan, abducts him, and forces him to help find diamonds a fellow prisoner hid. Harper enlists the help of a boy with a drone to find Nolan. The drone interrupts Oscar before he can kill Nolan. Nolan fights Oscar, but the latter escapes empty-handed via a helicopter. Tim comes to Lucy's house to make her breakfast and ask her to move in with him; Lucy falls asleep and misses his speech. Garza reveals that someone stole classified NSA documents, using them as leverage to get immunity. That person happens to be Monica, who walks by the team as a free woman, much to everyone's dismay.

=== Season 8 (2026) ===
No. overall	No. in season	Title	Directed by	Written by	Original release date	Prod. code	U.S. viewers (millions)
127	1	"Czech Mate"	Bill Roe	Alexi Hawley	January 6, 2026	801	N/A
As part of her immunity agreement, Monica agrees to assist an inter-agency task force in taking down a list of notorious criminals. Their first assignment is in Prague, where she arranges a meet with an arms trafficker under Nolan and Bailey's supervision, while Garza and Harper run point, and the rest of the Mid-Wilshire crew coordinates back in L.A. to arrest the trafficker's associates. The operation becomes complicated when Monica is targeted by hitmen sent by Jakob Olmstead. Back in L.A., Grey and Luna face complications in their marriage caused by their careers, while Tim and Lucy continue to dance around whether or not to reunite as a couple, and Miles is surprised by Smitty telling him that Shangri-La is becoming a homeowners' association, and Miles must now pay rent or face eviction. After the Prague operation is a success, Garza offers Harper a permanent role on the task force, then offers it to Grey when Harper declines. Grey accepts, while Tim and Lucy reconcile and agree to move in together, rescuing Miles, who agrees to move in with Celina. Nolan and Bailey use their remaining stay in Prague as a do-over honeymoon after their first was a disaster.
128	2	"Fast Andy"	Wendey Stanzler	Brynn Malone	January 13, 2026	802	N/A
Following Grey's reassignment, Tim is promoted to watch commander, and Lucy is transferred back to day shift as supervisor while Nolan is assigned as Miles's T.O., in time for a presidential visit to L.A. Following a less-than-glamorous case, Lopez and Harper contemplate alternate careers as they are tasked with tracking suspected criminals for the Secret Service. One such person, Jerry Hudson, is found to own numerous dangerous weapons and is unable to be located, beginning a manhunt. Nolan helps Miles cultivate his first C.I., and Miles chooses local criminal Fast Andy against Nolan's advice, leading to trouble when Miles promises he can let Andy go on small crimes, and Andy robs a dispensary. Lucy is assigned to finalize the motorcade route for the president and, in an effort to compartmentalize her relationship with Tim, declines his help. Harper and Lopez learn that Hudson is going after his ex-girlfriend, and they, along with Nolan and Miles, track him down to her workplace, where he is arrested. In the end, Lopez decides not to quit, and settles on a date with Wesley, while Tim and Lucy celebrate finally moving in together with a night out of their own with Kojo.
129	3	"The Red Place"	John Terlesky	Alexi Hawley & Brynn Malone	January 20, 2026	803	N/A
Nolan arrests a seemingly harmless homeless man named Ezra Kane on a simple breaking and entering charge, but it flags a three-year-old triple homicide case in Oregon. While Harper and Lopez dig into the case, they ask Nolan to conduct the interview. As he does and as the rest of the Mid-Wilshire crew dig deeper into the case, the terrifying truth begins to become clear, particularly when Samantha, the believed deceased teenage daughter of Ezra's other victims, is found alive. Ezra soon reveals he has taken a new girl, and the team mobilizes to find her, which Nolan soon does in a downtown parking garage. Lucy is able to help Samantha to begin healing by recounting her own trauma from when she was kidnapped and buried alive by Caleb Wright. Meanwhile, Miles reaches out to Seth and tries to convince him to get his life back in order. Seth is initially still locked in self-pity and standoffish with Miles, but soon agrees to let Miles help him get back on track. Elsewhere, Lopez freaks out over having forgotten her anniversary, and Tim and Lucy work on getting her unpacked while Grey takes Nolan out for a drink.
130	4	"Cut and Run"	Tori Garrett	Natalie Callaghan	January 26, 2026	804	N/A
Nolan and Bailey have dinner with her former CO. He offers her a job in D.C. before they witness a murder. The police learn the shooters were from rival gangs and pursue one of them, which ends with him dying. They learn the shooters committed the murder because the victim injured their foster mother. The second shooter, Kingston, turns to his gang for help, but they turn on him. The police intervene, subduing all the suspects, though Kingston is killed. Meanwhile, Wesley and Lopez consider buying a bigger house. Wesley is approached by the Democratic Party to run against Vivian in the upcoming DA election. Harper, James, and Lopez support the idea, as he would be able to make change in the judicial system. Lucy needs to find evidence Smitty incorrectly files it. Tim begins to doubt his abilities as watch commander. They find the evidence, and Lucy assures Tim he is more than capable. Bailey and Nolan talk about the job offer. He is against it as moving to D.C. would mean starting his police career all over again, but Bailey admits she does not want to turn it down.
131	5	"The Network"	Ryan Krayser	Fredrick Kotto	February 2, 2026	805	N/A
Aaron returns to Mid-Wilshire to assist with the task force. Garza and Grey have him reconnect with Kadeer Gazmi, his former cellmate and a drug trafficker, to infiltrate a private network for elite criminals by having him warn Kadeer. The ruse works, and they track the network to a server farm, which Nolan infiltrates with a team including Garza's niece, Elena, and Aaron in an attempt to upload malware. The team succeeds and escapes when the facility is torched. Monica secretly calls to warn Kadeer about the network breach. The police have to find a C.I. who shot two deputy sheriffs. The police confront the C.I. at a cemetery, where they take him into custody. Lucy and Celina notice evidence that contradicts the sheriffs' statements. The evidence and the C.I.'s statement point to them having an affair, leading to an argument in which they shot each other. When confronted by Lopez and Harper, the deputies instantly admit. Wesley prepares to announce his candidacy for district attorney. The attempt initially goes poorly, but Wesley is able to make a good first impression as a candidate. Nolan and Bailey argue over the job offer, and Bailey storms out.
132	6	"Burn 4 Love"	Lanre Olabisi	Moira Kirland	February 9, 2026	806	N/A
On Valentine's Day, Nolan and Bailey have to solve a string of romantically themed arsons. The method of starting the fires is similar to a known serial arsonist, Arnold McKenna, who is questioned. However, the trail leads to another arsonist, Mandy Fisk, who set the fires with her girlfriend as a Valentine's Day celebration using Arnold's method. Meanwhile, Harper is deposed in the Liam Glasser trial but a previous threat she made to him threatens to derail Wesley's prosecution and he has to report her behavior to Internal Affairs. The father of one of Glasser's victims attacks Wesley at a fundraiser he is throwing and is subdued. The video circulates the internet, helping Wesley's campaign, but he still feels guilty. Tim and Lucy have problems with the Valentine's Day gifts they originally planned and try to find last-minute replacements while Celina feels guilty over Miles supposedly being cursed by her crystal supplier. Arnold attaches a rigged explosive to Lucy and Celina's shop and it explodes inside the station's garage, though no one is killed. Nolan gives Bailey his blessing to take the job in D.C., promising they can navigate a long-distance relationship.
133	7	"Baja"	Jon Huertas	Amanda Mercedes	February 16, 2026	807	N/A
After finding two dead women in a van, Lucy discovers that they were working for a drug cartel in Baja, Mexico. She and Harper convince Grey to allow them to run an undercover operation. While undercover, they are approached by Rafael "Rafa" Navarro, a lieutenant for the cartel, who recruits them for a mule job. After an exchange, Rafa blackmails them into making another run with more hardcore drugs. In the middle of the deal, they learn that Chase, a member of a rival cartel, killed the women. The team arrests Rafa, his associates, and Chase. Meanwhile, Nolan begins navigating his long-distance relationship with Bailey when he and Miles are assigned to watch the girlfriend of Hamster, a criminal. Hamster appears at the house but he flees and Miles loses him. Miles recruits Seth to go on an unauthorized stakeout. Hamster shows up and captures Miles. Seth calls Nolan for backup and he and Tim arrive as Seth rescues Miles. Miles is fired for going rogue but Nolan manages to convince Tim to instead give him a two-week suspension and a six-month extension in the FTO program, advising Miles to use the opportunity to get over his confidence issues.
134	8	"Grand Theft Aircraft"	Bill Roe	Nick Hurwitz	February 23, 2026	808	N/A
Nolan is assigned to help Garza supervise a prisoner transport flight from Vegas to L.A. Among the prisoners is Oscar and private military head Heath Everett. Thirty minutes in, the pilot drugs his partner and attempts to divert the plane to Bakersfield as Everett's people are holding his family hostage. Tim and Metro manage to rescue the family. However, Lucy and Celina learn that a marshal was bribed to facilitate Everett's escape. After the plane crashes, the prisoners escape. Nolan and Garza survive and the LAPD and FBI pursues the escapees. Nolan is forced to let Oscar escape to stop a cannibal. Everett and the other prisoners are apprehended. Tim receives a surprise visit from his mother, Joy, who is introduced to Lucy. Lucy is upset that Tim never mentioned her to Joy, who is likewise upset that Tim never told her that Lucy moved in. Joy tells Lucy that Tim has always strove to protect the people he cares about. Lucy advises Joy to have a heart-to-heart with Tim. Harper is put back on patrol. At home, Nolan receives a call from Oscar, who promises he is going to be more careful to avoid getting caught in the future.
135	9	"Fun and Games"	Stephanie Martin	Madeleine Coghlan	March 2, 2026	809	N/A
Miles and Harper are paired together, and she refuses advice from Nolan and Tim, instead opting to let Miles treat her as a rookie to test his knowledge. They intercept a getaway car with two bank robbers, both of whom have been shot. One dies in surgery but Harper and Miles are assigned by Lopez to interview the other to get leads on a third suspect. Nolan and Celina get called to the set of Game Changer for a reported robbery but find the cast unhelpful when taking witness statements. Nolan is reunited with Dash, the drone pilot who helped Harper find him after being kidnapped by Oscar, and he helps with the investigation. When Sam Reich accidentally texts Dash that he hired actors to play robbers as part of a stunt, Nolan discovers he accidentally hired real robbers. While dealing with a toxic couple that is part of a ghost gun ring, Grey finds evidence that Luna may have been fooling around with a doctor coworker. When he confronts her about it, she admits to having complicated feelings for the man, upsetting Grey. Lucy tries to get Tim to communicate with Joy more. Note: This episode is a crossover with the cast of Game Changer.
136	10	"His Name Was Martin"	Alexi Hawley	Alexi Hawley	March 9, 2026 July 20, 2026 (extended cut)	810	N/A
Nolan, Harper and Miles, along with Dash, get called for a wellness check for workers at Westview Psychiatric. They discover the workers got exposed to chemicals that turned them into "zombies". Due to signal trouble, they are forced to stay ahead of the mob until help can arrive. Lucy and Celina are sent to investigate when the others do not check in. Lucy gets separated from Celina and cornered by Martin, a worker. He attacks her and Lucy is forced to kill him in self-defense, leaving her severely traumatized. Wesley sits down for a deposition with Ryan Dearbourne, the mental patient who Glasser convinced to take credit for the murders, which initially goes well. However, Angela informs Wesley that Ryan had a psychotic episode and Wesley returns to his office to find Ryan attempting to harm himself. Wesley talks him down and he and Angela discover that someone dosed Ryan with amphetamines. They suspect Malcolm Walsh, Glasser's attorney, but Wesley cautions that they will need evidence to prove it. Grey, still struggling to deal with his issues with Luna, contacts Bailey to investigate a Pentagon office that has ties to Everett. Bailey finds a mysterious woman who begins investigating her. Note: On July 20, 2026, a 5-and-a-half-minute expanded version of this episode premiered on Hulu.
137	11	"Aftermath"	Tori Garrett	Chelsea Urech	March 16, 2026	811	N/A
Wesley is instructed by the D.A. to offer Liam Glasser a plea deal but even that becomes compromised when Harrison Novak comes forward to confess to Glasser's murders, leading Wesley, Angela and Nyla to suspect that Vivian is colluding with Malcolm to sabotage Wesley's campaign. Lucy is still dealing with trauma from killing Martin in self-defense and Tim advises her to take it easy, especially after Lucy is confronted by Martin's sister demanding answers for his death. Despite Tim advising against it, Lucy meets with the woman and tells her the truth. Lucy and Tim assist John and Celina in investigating a murder and they discover the victim was being tracked by Randy, who was hired by the matriarch of a notorious crime family seeking revenge for her granddaughter's death. John receives a warning from Zuzu, the rogue AI, that Bailey is being followed after her encounter with the mysterious woman at the Pentagon. Grey, John and Bailey set up a fake meet back in Los Angeles to try and draw out the people following her. Glasser is released from prison and Wesley, Angela and Nyla decide to redouble their efforts to bring him to justice.
138	12	"Spy Games"	Antonio Negret	Natalie Callaghan & Fatima Eldigair	March 23, 2026	812	N/A
John picks up Bailey at LAX and they along with Garza, Elena and the Mid-Wilshire crew, immediately launch into a sting operation to try and draw out Bailey's stalkers. The sting succeeds and they are able to identify the four stalkers and identify them as members of Everett's team working for a top DOD official, Brigadier General Adam Pressman. The Mid-Wilshire team learns from Zuzu that Pressman hired assassins to go after Everett's team. The police are able to bring the team in for protective custody. Wesley faces more heat in his campaign when Elijah Stone makes a public allegation that Wesley was having an affair with Monica while they were both in Elijah's employ. Wesley asks Monica to release a statement denying the affair. Zuzu contacts Angela to give her dirt on Vivian but decides not to use it. Wade and Luna begin mending fences, Bailey decides to move home and Zuzu is finally shut down.
139	13	"The Thinker"	Troian Bellisario	Moira Kirland & Aleks Biskis	March 30, 2026	813	N/A
After the Shangri-La officers (except Smitty) quit after winning the lottery, Tim, Lucy, Celina and Miles hold a recruitment drive which turns up two candidates. The first is a woman who wants to join to be close to her boyfriend, who is actually a criminal posing as a cop to rip off drug dealers with the help of a former LAPD captain, whom Angela and Nyla quickly arrest. The other candidate is Seth, hoping to earn his way back into the LAPD. Tim makes Seth take a polygraph, during which Seth's cover-up during the wildfire is revealed, disqualifying him. However, Tim and Lucy commend him for his honesty and he hits it off with the other applicant. On her first day back with LAFD, Bailey is assigned a rookie, Oakley, to train and asks John to ride along to give tips. However, they are abducted while trying to treat a gunshot victim by the criminals who shot him. Oakley gets shot but John and Bailey are able to incapacitate the crooks and save him. Luna and Grey agree to move back in together and Wesley loses the D.A. race, deciding to return to being a defense attorney.
140	14	"Tiger Bear"	Jennifer Lynch	Madeleine Coghlan & Jackson Deakins	April 6, 2026	814	N/A
Tim decides to take his leadership out on the streets. Celina starts temporary assignment with the detectives' bureau and chooses to work in Missing Persons. Despite discouragement from her supervisor, Detective Desmond, Celina digs deep to find a solvable case, eventually solving the disappearance of a young woman who lives in her building. Dash calls Nolan to report a dead body of one of his teachers. After solving the case, Dash is picked up by his deadbeat father and calls Nolan for help when criminals invade. Dash talks them into robbing his classmates and Nolan and Tim follow, arriving in time to rescue them. Sean Del Monte attempts to convince Wesley to stay at the D.A.'s office to counter Vivian's tough on crime approach. Vivian orders Wesley and Sean to get offenders to agree to plea deals on upgraded charges, but they both convince the various defense attorneys to take their chances at trial. They both end up quitting and decide to open a firm together.
141	15	"Survive the Streets"	Ashley Williams	Natalie Callaghan & Nick Hurwitz	April 13, 2026	815	N/A
In another true crime documentary, the Mid-Wilshire crew detail the case of Rich Rowley, a former LAPD officer who had seemingly died years prior in a boating accident, when Nolan and Celina find a crazed Rich after he stabbed himself. After finding the body of a murder victim in Rich's garage, Smitty recognizes a tattoo on the victim's arm from one of Rich's old training videos. This leads Lucy to find more clues tied to multiple cold cases hidden in Rich's videos. Rich believed the cases were tied to a dangerous cult that believed random citizens were being possessed by a demon called Malaphus. The case leads to the entertainment industry, even involving a meeting with Jensen Ackles and Jared Padalecki, before it is discovered that the murders were not motivated by demonic possession but were arranged by a B-movie horror director who was using the cult to eliminate his personal enemies.
142	16	"Out of Time"	John Terlesky	Moira Kirland & Amanda Mercedes	April 20, 2026	816	N/A
Someone tries to kill Liam Glasser and the Mid-Wilshire team is assigned to protect him. While John and Miles shadow him, Nyla tries to follow the trail of Glasser's attacker, a trail that eventually leads to the son of one of Glasser's victims. John is wounded in the ensuing shootout but survives. However, Glasser's ex-wife panics and runs away with their kids. Wesley and Del Monte start their new firm and are referred a client by Monica. Their new client, Ethan McAvoy, is suspected of killing a missing person that Angela is trying to find and the evidence points to him. Ethan reveals he was hired to throw a party and gain access to the victim's crypto wallet and Wesley and Del Monte realize he was set up to be a fall guy, agreeing to take his case. Tim is thinking about proposing to Lucy and Joy gives him his grandmother's ring to use, which everyone else advises he not use. He decides not to use the ring, and offers to let Joy consult when he picks out a ring for Lucy. Monica uses Grey and the task force to manipulate Aiden Warner into getting one last big payday.
143	17	"Dead Ringer"	Ryan Krayser	Alexi Hawley & Brynn Malone	April 27, 2026	817	N/A
Aaron is carjacked, also losing his expensive new watch. Tim and Lucy volunteer to help recover Aaron's property and Aaron pays them back by connecting Tim with his jeweler to find the perfect ring for Lucy. Celina volunteers to feel out what Lucy wants but her malfunctioning phone leads to misunderstandings with both Aaron and Rodge. John and Nyla are able to track down Miranda and convince her to return to court and face Glasser. John is unexpectedly called to testify and his testimony convinces the judge to deny Glasser custody. In revenge, Glasser leaves John with an ominous warning that he is responsible for what happens next. Aiden Warner tasks Monica with setting the task force on rival Cooper Johnson but Grey and Garza are already onto her. They are able to find Monica's leverage and issue a warrant for her arrest. Monica flees and briefly visits Wesley to say goodbye. As Monica is headed to the airport, the cab driver assassinates her.
144	18	"The Bandit"	Bill Roe	Alexi Hawley	May 4, 2026	818	N/A
The LAPD and FBI team up in order to move Heath Everett to a court hearing. Malcolm approaches Wesley with an offer to join Everett's legal team regarding minor crimes, which Wesley accepts, angering Tim. During the transport, Everett's mercenaries attack and retrieve him using a helicopter magnet. Tim loses his ring in the process, but Lopez later retrieves it and informs him that Wesley joined Everett's team to find dirt on Malcolm. The team traces Everett to a boat, which they raid. In the process, Everett is captured by Tim, while Nolan stays behind to hold off the mercenaries and manages to escape. Miles is horrified after a criminal he processed pulls out a gun and attempts to escape, until Harper informs him that the gun was a result of a night shift error. At a beach, Tim proposes to Lucy, and she accepts, but two passersby working for Everett drug and abduct them.

== Ratings ==
=== Season 1 ===
Viewership and ratings per episode of List of The Rookie episodes
No.	Title	Air date	Rating (18–49)	Viewers (millions)	DVR (18–49)	DVR viewers (millions)	Total (18–49)	Total viewers (millions)
1	"Pilot"	October 16, 2018	1.0	5.43	0.8	4.26	1.8	9.68
2	"Crash Course"	October 23, 2018	0.8	4.54	0.8	4.29	1.6	8.83
3	"The Good, the Bad and the Ugly"	October 30, 2018	0.8	4.53	0.7	3.82	1.5	8.35
4	"The Switch"	November 13, 2018	0.7	4.01	0.9	4.19	1.6	8.20
5	"The Roundup"	November 20, 2018	0.7	4.10	0.9	4.43	1.6	8.53
6	"The Hawke"	November 27, 2018	0.8	4.38	0.8	4.26	1.6	8.64
7	"The Ride Along"	December 4, 2018	0.7	4.20	0.8	3.98	1.5	8.18
8	"Time of Death"	December 11, 2018	0.8	4.27	0.7	3.94	1.5	8.21
9	"Standoff"	January 8, 2019	0.6	3.95	0.7	3.47	1.4	7.43
10	"Flesh and Blood"	January 15, 2019	0.7	3.83	0.8	4.29	1.5	8.12
11	"Redwood"	January 22, 2019	0.7	3.84	0.9	4.42	1.6	8.26
12	"Heartbreak"	February 12, 2019	0.6	3.64	0.9	4.49	1.5	8.13
13	"Caught Stealing"	February 19, 2019	0.6	3.54	0.8	4.09	1.4	7.63
14	"Plain Clothes Day"	February 26, 2019	0.6	3.89	0.9	4.18	1.5	8.09
15	"Manhunt"	March 5, 2019	0.8	4.51	0.7	4.02	1.5	8.54
16	"Greenlight"	March 19, 2019	0.7	4.24	0.8	4.36	1.5	8.60
17	"The Shake Up"	March 26, 2019	0.7	4.24	0.8	4.12	1.5	8.37
18	"Homefront"	April 2, 2019	0.7	3.84	0.8	4.06	1.5	7.91
19	"The Checklist"	April 9, 2019	0.6	3.63	0.8	4.29	1.4	7.92
20	"Free Fall"	April 16, 2019	0.7	4.06	0.8	4.41	1.5	8.48

=== Season 2 ===
Viewership and ratings per episode of List of The Rookie episodes
No.	Title	Air date	Rating (18–49)	Viewers (millions)	DVR (18–49)	DVR viewers (millions)	Total (18–49)	Total viewers (millions)
1	"Impact"	September 29, 2019	0.7	4.11	0.7	4.02	1.4	8.13
2	"The Night General"	October 6, 2019	0.6	3.83	0.7	3.91	1.3	7.74
3	"The Bet"	October 13, 2019	0.6	3.60	0.7	3.92	1.3	7.52
4	"Warriors and Guardians"	October 20, 2019	0.6	3.76	0.7	3.83	1.3	7.55
5	"Tough Love"	October 27, 2019	0.5	3.24	0.8	3.91	1.3	7.15
6	"Fallout"	November 3, 2019	0.5	3.50	0.7	3.90	1.2	7.40
7	"Safety"	November 10, 2019	0.6	3.73	0.7	3.87	1.3	7.60
8	"Clean Cut"	November 17, 2019	0.5	3.61	0.7	3.67	1.2	7.28
9	"Breaking Point"	December 1, 2019	0.5	3.36	0.7	3.97	1.2	7.34
10	"The Dark Side"	December 8, 2019	0.6	3.70	0.7	4.12	1.3	7.82
11	"Day of Death"	February 23, 2020	0.8	4.92	0.6	3.99	1.4	8.91
12	"Now and Then"	March 1, 2020	0.7	4.55	0.7	3.96	1.4	8.51
13	"Follow-Up Day"	March 8, 2020	0.8	5.12	0.7	3.69	1.5	8.82
14	"Casualties"	March 15, 2020	0.8	5.17	0.7	3.90	1.5	9.07
15	"Hand-Off"	March 22, 2020	0.8	5.18	0.6	3.60	1.4	8.78
16	"The Overnight"	April 5, 2020	0.8	5.87	0.6	3.69	1.4	9.55
17	"Control"	April 12, 2020	0.6	4.57	0.7	3.71	1.3	8.27
18	"Under the Gun"	April 26, 2020	0.7	4.96	0.6	3.92	1.3	8.88
19	"The Q Word"	May 3, 2020	0.7	5.00	0.6	3.87	1.3	8.86
20	"The Hunt"	May 10, 2020	0.6	4.66	0.7	3.83	1.3	8.49

=== Season 3 ===
Viewership and ratings per episode of List of The Rookie episodes
No.	Title	Air date	Rating (18–49)	Viewers (millions)	DVR (18–49)	DVR viewers (millions)	Total (18–49)	Total viewers (millions)
1	"Consequences"	January 3, 2021	0.5	3.44	0.5	3.43	1.0	6.87
2	"In Justice"	January 10, 2021	0.5	3.15	0.5	3.41	1.0	6.56
3	"La Fiera"	January 17, 2021	0.5	3.76	0.5	3.40	1.0	7.16
4	"Sabotage"	January 24, 2021	0.4	3.39	—N/a	—N/a	—N/a	—N/a
5	"Lockdown"	February 14, 2021	0.6	4.08	0.5	3.51	1.2	7.60
6	"Revelations"	February 21, 2021	0.6	4.11	0.5	3.48	1.1	7.59
7	"True Crime"	February 28, 2021	0.4	3.45	0.5	3.52	0.9	6.97
8	"Bad Blood"	March 28, 2021	0.4	3.87	—N/a	—N/a	—N/a	—N/a
9	"Amber"	April 4, 2021	0.5	3.80	0.5	3.50	1.0	7.30
10	"Man of Honor"	April 11, 2021	0.4	3.70	0.5	3.42	1.0	7.12
11	"New Blood"	April 18, 2021	0.5	3.81	0.5	3.18	0.9	6.99
12	"Brave Heart"	May 2, 2021	0.5	4.00	0.5	3.29	1.0	7.29
13	"Triple Duty"	May 9, 2021	0.6	3.91	0.5	3.23	1.1	7.14
14	"Threshold"	May 16, 2021	0.5	3.77	0.5	3.28	1.0	7.06

=== Season 4 ===
Viewership and ratings per episode of List of The Rookie episodes
No.	Title	Air date	Rating (18–49)	Viewers (millions)	DVR (18–49)	DVR viewers (millions)	Total (18–49)	Total viewers (millions)
1	"Life and Death"	September 26, 2021	0.4	3.03	—N/a	—N/a	—N/a	—N/a
2	"Five Minutes"	October 3, 2021	0.3	3.09	—N/a	—N/a	—N/a	—N/a
3	"In the Line of Fire"	October 10, 2021	0.3	2.69	—N/a	—N/a	—N/a	—N/a
4	"Red Hot"	October 17, 2021	0.4	2.83	—N/a	—N/a	—N/a	—N/a
5	"A.C.H."	October 31, 2021	0.3	2.64	—N/a	—N/a	—N/a	—N/a
6	"Poetic Justice"	November 7, 2021	0.3	2.72	—N/a	—N/a	—N/a	—N/a
7	"Fire Fight"	November 14, 2021	0.3	2.59	—N/a	—N/a	—N/a	—N/a
8	"Hit and Run"	December 5, 2021	0.3	2.78	0.4	3.23	0.7	6.01
9	"Breakdown"	December 12, 2021	0.3	2.66	0.4	3.20	0.7	5.86
10	"Heart Beat"	January 2, 2022	0.3	2.84	—N/a	—N/a	—N/a	—N/a
11	"End Game"	January 9, 2022	0.4	2.85	—N/a	—N/a	—N/a	—N/a
12	"The Knock"	January 23, 2022	0.3	2.83	—N/a	—N/a	—N/a	—N/a
13	"Fight or Flight"	January 30, 2022	0.3	3.19	—N/a	—N/a	—N/a	—N/a
14	"Long Shot"	February 27, 2022	0.4	3.67	—N/a	—N/a	—N/a	—N/a
15	"Hit List"	March 6, 2022	0.5	3.88	0.4	3.22	0.9	7.09
16	"Real Crime"	March 13, 2022	0.4	3.29	0.4	3.14	0.8	6.43
17	"Coding"	April 3, 2022	0.4	3.50	0.4	3.04	0.7	6.54
18	"Backstabbers"	April 10, 2022	0.4	3.53	0.3	3.12	0.7	6.65
19	"Simone"	April 24, 2022	0.4	3.95	0.4	3.26	0.8	7.19
20	"Enervo"	May 1, 2022	0.5	4.17	—N/a	—N/a	—N/a	—N/a
21	"Mother's Day"	May 8, 2022	0.4	3.68	—N/a	—N/a	—N/a	—N/a
22	"Day In The Hole"	May 15, 2022	0.4	3.65	—N/a	—N/a	—N/a	—N/a

=== Season 5 ===
Viewership and ratings per episode of List of The Rookie episodes
No.	Title	Air date	Rating (18–49)	Viewers (millions)	DVR (18–49)	DVR viewers (millions)	Total (18–49)	Total viewers (millions)
1	"Double Down"	September 25, 2022	0.3	3.36	0.3	2.99	0.6	6.35
2	"Labor Day"	October 2, 2022	0.3	2.93	0.3	2.88	0.6	5.81
3	"Dye Hard"	October 9, 2022	0.3	3.12	0.4	2.94	0.6	6.05
4	"The Choice"	October 16, 2022	0.4	3.08	0.4	2.96	0.7	6.05
5	"The Fugitive"	October 23, 2022	0.4	3.40	0.4	2.89	0.7	6.28
6	"The Reckoning"	October 30, 2022	0.3	3.52	0.4	3.01	0.6	6.53
7	"Crossfire"	November 6, 2022	0.3	3.02	0.3	2.93	0.6	5.95
8	"The Collar"	December 4, 2022	0.4	3.75	0.3	2.58	0.7	6.33
9	"Take Back"	December 4, 2022	0.4	3.65	0.3	2.84	0.7	6.49
10	"The List"	January 3, 2023	0.6	4.69	0.3	2.57	1.0	7.26
11	"The Naked and The Dead"	January 10, 2023	0.5	4.03	0.3	2.60	0.8	6.63
12	"Death Notice"	January 17, 2023	0.6	4.78	0.3	2.46	0.9	7.23
13	"Daddy Cop"	January 24, 2023	0.5	4.37	—N/a	—N/a	—N/a	—N/a
14	"Death Sentence"	January 31, 2023	0.5	4.77	—N/a	—N/a	—N/a	—N/a
15	"The Con"	February 14, 2023	0.5	4.10	—N/a	—N/a	—N/a	—N/a
16	"Exposed"	February 21, 2023	0.6	4.15	—N/a	—N/a	—N/a	—N/a
17	"The Enemy Within"	February 28, 2023	0.5	4.11	—N/a	—N/a	—N/a	—N/a
18	"Double Trouble"	March 21, 2023	0.5	3.95	—N/a	—N/a	—N/a	—N/a
19	"A Hole in the World"	March 28, 2023	0.5	4.47	—N/a	—N/a	—N/a	—N/a
20	"S.T.R."	April 18, 2023	0.4	3.61	—N/a	—N/a	—N/a	—N/a
21	"Going Under"	April 25, 2023	0.4	3.55	—N/a	—N/a	—N/a	—N/a
22	"Under Siege"	May 2, 2023	0.5	4.33	—N/a	—N/a	—N/a	—N/a

=== Season 6 ===
Viewership and ratings per episode of List of The Rookie episodes
No.	Title	Air date	Rating/share (18–49)	Viewers (millions)	Ref.
1	"Strike Back"	February 20, 2024	0.4	3.77	
2	"The Hammer"	February 27, 2024	0.4	3.29	
3	"Trouble in Paradise"	March 5, 2024	0.3	3.49	
4	"Training Day"	March 26, 2024	0.3	3.06	
5	"The Vow"	April 2, 2024	0.4	3.39	
6	"Secrets and Lies"	April 9, 2024	0.3	3.36	
7	"Crushed"	April 30, 2024	0.2	3.69	
8	"Punch Card"	May 7, 2024	0.3	2.87	
9	"The Squeeze"	May 14, 2024	0.3	2.98	
10	"Escape Plan"	May 21, 2024	0.3	3.14	

=== Season 7 ===
Viewership and ratings per episode of List of The Rookie episodes
No.	Title	Air date	Rating/share (18–49)	Viewers (millions)	Ref.
1	"The Shot"	January 7, 2025	0.3	3.41	
2	"The Watcher"	January 14, 2025	0.3	3.45	
3	"Out of Pocket"	January 21, 2025	0.3	3.34	
4	"Darkness Falling"	January 28, 2025	0.2	2.56	
5	"Til Death"	February 4, 2025	0.2	2.55	
6	"The Gala"	February 11, 2025	0.2	2.77	
7	"The Mickey"	February 18, 2025	0.3	3.31	
8	"Wildfire"	February 25, 2025	0.3	3.12	
9	"The Kiss"	March 11, 2025	0.3	3.29	
10	"Chaos Agent"	March 18, 2025	0.3	3.27	
11	"Speed"	March 25, 2025	0.3	3.72	
12	"April Fools"	April 1, 2025	0.3	3.27	
13	"Three Billboards"	April 8, 2025	0.2	3.21	
14	"Mad About Murder"	April 15, 2025	0.3	2.97	
15	"A Deadly Secret"	April 22, 2025	0.2	2.83	
16	"The Return"	April 29, 2025	0.2	2.84	
17	"Mutiny and the Bounty"	May 6, 2025	0.3	3.11	
18	"The Good, the Bad, and the Oscar"	May 13, 2025	0.3	3.02	
