= The Rookie series 2 =

Second series of The Rookie

The Rookie
- Series 2
- Starring: Nathan Fillion; Alyssa Diaz; Richard T. Jones; Titus Makin Jr.; Melissa O'Neil; Eric Winter; Mekia Cox
- No. of episodes: 20

Release
- Original release: September 29, 2019 – May 10, 2020

Series chronology
- ← Previous; Series 1 Next → Series 3

The series season of the American police procedural television series The Rookie premiered on ABC on 29 September 2019, and concluded on 10 May 2020.

The season consists of 20 episodes and continues the story of John Nolan (Nathan Fillion), and his fellow officers at the Los Angeles Police Department's Mid-Wilshire Division.

The second season continues following John Nolan as he progresses through his career as the oldest rookie in the LAPD.

Jackson West faces new challenges involving his career and relationships, while Angela Lopez deals with developments in her relationship with Wesley Evers (Shawn Ashmore).

A new training officer, Nyla Harper (Mekia Cox), joins the Mid-Wilshire Division and becomes Nolan's new training officer. Harper has a background in undercover work and takes an unconventional approach to policing.

== Cast ==
- Nathan Fillion as John Nolan
- Alyssa Diaz as Angela Lopez
- Richard T. Jones as Wade Grey
- Titus Makin Jr. as Jackson West
- Melissa O'Neil as Lucy Chen
- Eric Winter as Tim Bradford
- Mekia Cox as Nyla Harper

== Episodes ==
No. overall	No. in season	Title	Directed by	Written by	Original release date	Prod. code	U.S. viewers (millions)
21	1	"Impact"	Mike Goi	Alexi Hawley	September 29, 2019	201	4.11
Tim's collapse was due to an allergic reaction to the experimental vaccine, and he recovers in time to take out a third terrorist from the previous attack with Nolan. Talia resigned from the LAPD and has joined the ATF. Nolan has moved into a new home that he's renovating. The rookies learn the scores of their six-month exams: Nolan 97, Lucy 91, and Jackson 81. While all three pass, allowing them to wear short sleeves instead of long sleeves, Tim forces Lucy to continue wearing long sleeves. After getting the lowest score rattles Jackson, causing him to act out, Grey demotes him, stating Jackson cannot wear short sleeves until Grey can trust him again. After Nolan and Grey interrupt a robbery at a police store, the team learns of a plan involving fake police officers. They arrest the imposters following a shootout.
22	2	"The Night General"	Rob Bowman	Fredrick Kotto	October 6, 2019	202	3.83
Jackson arrests his landlord for dealing drugs, but he is forced to move as his building has been declared a "house of ill repute". Nolan is assigned as partner to new detective Nick Armstrong and their investigation into a recent murder leads to an unexpected reunion with Nolan's old love interest Grace. Lucy is also still upset at Tim because he will not allow her to wear short sleeves even though she passed the midterm exam. Meanwhile, the father of the murder victim kills one of the men who murdered his son, and nearly kills the other suspect as well by placing him in a concrete mold, before Nolan and Armstrong manage to save him. However, the father commits suicide by hanging himself from a metal cable in a warehouse despite Nolan's attempts to persuade him not to. Jackson attempts to move into Smitty's trailer park as he doesn't have a place to live. However, Lucy learns of his predicament, and she allows him to move into her apartment.
23	3	"The Bet"	Barbara Brown	Corey Miller	October 13, 2019	203	3.60
Nolan tries to navigate his relationship with Jessica and he builds a rapport with Grace while investigating a criminal case involving a homeland security agent with Lopez. Jackson is assigned to Officer Smitty for the day and he struggles to deal with the laid-back and lazy Smitty. Later, a criminal that Jackson is patting down escapes and the criminal drops his gun in a nearby yard. A young boy, believing that the gun is a toy, picks it up and accidentally shoots his mother fatally, infuriating Jackson. They are later able to capture the criminal following a search after learning that the gun was used in another murder as well. Lucy also sets up Tim on a date with Rachel Hall, a social services agent and a friend of Lucy's from college, as part of a bet. Lucy later discovers that Tim and Rachel are now dating, meaning that she has won the bet and can go back to wearing short sleeves.
24	4	"Warriors and Guardians"	Lisa Demaine	Brynn Malone	October 20, 2019	204	3.76
Nolan gets a new training officer, Nyla Harper, a former undercover detective. They pull over a car with no plates and one of the occupants flees, later falling from a roof top. Nolan suspects foul play but Harper's body cam shows he jumped himself. While on patrol, they encounter Ross Teagan, a known drug dealer from Harper's past. An operation is commenced to set up Ross, but another suspect, Osito, is spotted leaving the scene. Together with Tim and Lucy, Nolan and Harper arrest Osito. Grey has Harper apologize to Nolan for her treatment of him, which he accepts. Tim struggles to find a birthday gift for Rachel, and reluctantly accepts help from Lucy. Jackson and Lopez apprehend two boys who harassed a homeless woman, Alice Sheldon, who turns out to be responsible for a hit and run ten years ago that left the victim paralyzed and eventually caused Alice to suffer a breakdown. Despite initially being against Lopez's defence of Alice, the victim, Karin Arnoux, later decides to speak to the DA on Alice's behalf.
25	5	"Tough Love"	Rachel Feldman	Vincent Angell	October 27, 2019	205	3.24
Lucy's mother comes to stay with her after having an argument with Lucy's father, frustrating Lucy. Nolan deals with surprising news that his son Henry is now engaged with his girlfriend, Abigail. The rookies recruit their first confidential informants. Nolan's first informant is Bianca, a drug dealer who overdoses afterwards helping Nolan. Nolan's second informant is a forger, who turns out to be helping women on the run from the cartel. Tim and Lucy deal with a young woman who is selling her stepmother's belongings to a pawn shop out of revenge for her cruel treatment of her. Lopez and Jackson successfully flip a known FBI informant, leaving the FBI handler furious and impressing Grey, who allows Jackson to finally wear short sleeves. Nolan learns that Abigail committed arson in the past, and he brings it up to Henry and her. Abigail explains the truth about her arson, after which Nolan apologizes to her.
26	6	"Fallout"	Bill Johnson	Robert Bella	November 3, 2019	206	3.50
The officers deal with an impending missile attack and also deal with their own disasters. Nolan attends a probationary court hearing, and he, Jessica, and Wesley help calm people down during the threat. They all hide in a fallout shelter, and Nolan and Jessica help subdue two prisoners that attempt to escape. Harper picks up her daughter from school, and has Rachel watch her at the station. Tim and Lucy also help a store owner deal with looters while Lopez and Jackson help save several people who are preparing to jump off of a building. Harper's ex-husband Donovan is furious at her for picking up their daughter and wants her arrested, but Nolan helps convince him that she has changed for the better. Wesley is also stabbed by one of the prisoners, Oscar Hutchinson, during the escape attempt and is hospitalized, but he survives his injuries.
27	7	"Safety"	Sylvain White	Terence Paul Winter	November 10, 2019	207	3.73
The relationship between Nolan and Jessica gets a lot more complicated after she delivers news that she might be pregnant. Nolan also assists Grace at the hospital at a meeting for expectant mothers, where he helps to subdue the unruly boyfriend of one of the women. Lopez is on temporary leave from the force following Wesley's stabbing, and she takes a job in private security escorting a high profile businessman. Officers Tim and Jackson also help out the Watts Rams as volunteer coaches, and they help rescue the mother of one of the team's star players from several armed kidnappers. Lucy and Harper are also assigned to one another, and have several disagreements before they work together to subdue a serial bomber. Nolan and Jessica break up after Jessica asks him to have kids as Nolan isn't ready to have more kids of his own.
28	8	"Clean Cut"	Toa Fraser	Mary Trahan	November 17, 2019	208	3.61
Nolan kicks off his birthday by babysitting a crime scene at a law office. He meets Ellroy Basso, a professional cleaner, and they have to evade two criminals when they return to the scene looking for a hidden stash of money. Meanwhile, Tim is involved in an accident when he rear-ends a woman while on patrol. Jackson is also exposed to a substance during a traffic stop and begins to act like he is on drugs. Sgt. Grey also rides patrol with Officer Harper after she requests an early annual evaluation to better her chances of getting custody of her daughter, and Grey observes her compassion in dealing with a near-drunk driver who was depressed after a cancer diagnosis. In the end, it is revealed the boyfriend of the woman Tim hit is intentionally scamming people to earn money by disconnecting the brake lights on the woman's car. Tim and Lucy also thwart a potential murder that the woman's boyfriend is trying to commit. Jackson is evaluated at the hospital but his exposure to the substance is not as serious as initially feared, allowing both Tim and Jackson to receive a special award from the deputy chief.
29	9	"Breaking Point"	Leslie Libman	Alexi Hawley & Corey Miller	December 1, 2019	209	3.36
Nolan's trust is tested when he tries to help the previous owner of his home reconnect with his family. Nolan later has to subdue and arrest him when the other man breaks into the house in the middle of the night. Meanwhile, Officer Harper has finally earned an overnight visit with her daughter that is put into jeopardy when her past undercover life resurfaces again. Nolan also has to go undercover in order to save Harper's life. Tim and Lucy deal with a murder when a lost dog is found covered with blood, resulting in a disturbing case where a woman was killed by her own son because she broke up with her boyfriend. Wesley is brought in as the kid's lawyer, but struggles with PTSD from when he was stabbed after the boy brings up the knife. Lopez and Jackson assist the stars of a police drama by showing them proper LAPD procedure after running into the lead actor during an arrest, with Jackson hitting it off with the actor while Lopez assists his co-star in dealing with a stalker, learning that the stalker is one of the production crew who shoots Jackson before she is subdued.
30	10	"The Dark Side"	Bill Roe	Alexi Hawley	December 8, 2019	210	3.70
The department is tasked with assisting convicted serial killer Rosalind Dyer (Annie Wersching) to find the remains of 3 of her victims in exchange for commuting her death sentence to life in prison. While on the way to her gravesites, the team is forced to stop a man from killing her, and they discover new bodies in Rosalind's gravesites. Nolan talks to Rosalind about the possibility of there being a third victim, as two bodies were found along with Rosalind's original kills, having been killed by a different serial killer. Rosalind refuses to help them, and the team is forced to find the new victim on their own. Nolan and Harper manage to find the third victim alive but the killer manages to escape after attempting to drown Nolan in a storm drain. The episode ends with Lucy being drugged and forced into the back of a car by her date at a bar.
31	11	"Day of Death"	David McWhirter	Brynn Malone & Fredrick Kotto	February 23, 2020	211	4.92
Lucy awakes after being drugged by her date, tattooed by him with her "day of death". The station works to find Lucy after they realize they haven't seen her in 13 hours. It is revealed that her date, Caleb Wright, is the protégé of Rosalind Dyer. Caleb buries Lucy in a barrel in the middle of the desert then kidnaps Armstrong and takes him to a house that belonged to Rosalind's uncle, where Lucy is buried. Nolan and Harper track Caleb to the house, where Harper fatally shoots Caleb to save Armstrong. With Caleb dead, the officers spread out and search for Lucy, with Tim finding and performing CPR on her, saving her life. Lopez and Wesley discuss his mental health after she found him unconscious after mixing his pills with alcohol. Wesley decides to go to work after seeing what Lucy went through and acknowledges that he should seek help. Nolan visits Rosalind in prison, revealing that they found the locations where she buried her victims, meaning there will be no more deals. Rosalind tells him that she has one more secret, which is about Armstrong. Nolan tells her that he doesn't care about that but Rosalind replies that she knows he'll be back.
32	12	"Now and Then"	C. Chi-Yoon Chung	Robert Bella	March 1, 2020	212	4.55
Nolan takes his son's fiancé Abigail on a ride-along with Tim after she reveals she wants to be a police officer. Tim offers to put in a word for her at the police academy, but tells Nolan that she won't be able to become a cop due to her criminal record. Harper asks Tim to switch rookies for the week, where she will ride with a recovering Lucy. Lucy struggles to trust her judgment again, so Harper and Lopez take her to speed dating to try to regain her judgment. Lucy gets triggered and snaps when one of the men at the event pulls a loose thread on her sweater, throwing him to the ground. Lucy says that Harper will never understand what she went through, where Harper later reveals that she was raped by her UC handler and implies that she sent him to early retirement, throwing him down some stairs.
33	13	"Follow-Up Day"	Liz Friedlander	Alexi Hawley	March 8, 2020	213	5.12
Nolan learns of the news that his father has recently died, and inherits an old car. The rookies and their training officers are put through follow up day, where they're assigned dormant cases. Nolan and Harper investigate a robbery of lottery tickets while Jackson and Lopez investigate the theft of a statue. When Wesley's mother has been arrested for possessing an unlicensed gun, Wesley learns that she got the gun from Christian Roberts, who has a record of armed robberies, who Lopez and Jackson later arrest. Tim and Lucy investigate a case of money laundering involving Nevin Cooper, who has gone through rehab and working at a local bakery, but is still in debt to his former gang. Tim makes the bakery the go-to donut shop for fellow LAPD officers, forcing the gang to look elsewhere for laundering money due to cops frequenting the area. Tim receives his sergeant exam results, but turns down the offer of starting in North Hollywood, in favor of finishing training Lucy. Nolan meets his half-brother Pete (Pete Davidson), who twice steals the car he inherited, but they manage to work out a better relationship.
34	14	"Casualties"	Sylvain White	Bill Rinier	March 15, 2020	214	5.17
Lopez and Jackson are called to a man who is shot in the top of his head and seems to ramble. Tim and Lucy are called to a couple, where the wife reports to being stalked by a drone. Grey connects the two cases and solves them both. Nolan and Harper discover a body, identified as Joe Delacruz, in a warehouse. When they search Joe's hotel room, they find counterfeit money and encounter an Afghanistan war veteran, Mitch. Tim was Mitch's commanding officer when they served together. Grey, on orders from higher ups, orders them to let the case rest. Deciding against it, Tim learns that the DIA is behind the counterfeit related to an ongoing operation while Nolan is confronted by Norman Jangus, the main man of the operation, at his home. Tim makes Jangus give up who killed Joe Delacruz and decides that they should look away from the counterfeit. Lucy gives her dog, Kojo, to Tim, after he destroys her apartment and realizing she is not ready to be a dog owner.
35	15	"Hand-Off"	Michael Goi	Vincent Angell & Mary Trahan	March 22, 2020	215	5.18
Nolan's identity is stolen and he works to restore his credit score to remain a police officer and get his money back to fund Henry's college tuition. Grey and Lopez head to Lompoc Prison to testify at a parole hearing for a man who shot Grey and his partner Dennis Rowland, who died in Lopez's arms her first day on the job. Despite the man's parole being denied, Grey votes in favor of parole after interacting with the man and his son. While Grey and Lopez are at the hearing, Jackson is assigned to make sure the station is in compliance with all guidelines, during which he finds an unassigned unsolved vandalism case which leads to him solving a homicide. Tim meets Rachel's father, a former sheriff of a small town who reveals he does not want his daughter marrying a cop, especially since there's a chance Rachel might have Huntington's disease.
36	16	"The Overnight"	Stephanie Marquardt	Corey Miller & Rachael Seymour	April 5, 2020	216	5.87
Lucy and Tim respond to a call at the Los Angeles auditions of "American Idol" and Lucy ends up facing Ryan Seacrest and the judges. Lucy befriends a reporter (Roselyn Sanchez) whose motives are not clear, and later she and Tim have to save the reporter during an arrest. Harper asks Nolan to come along with her to her ex-husband Donovan's home to help her daughter who is having trouble sleeping. This leads to Nolan's life being put in danger during a domestic dispute with one of Donovan's neighbors. At the end, Wesley proposes to Lopez and she accepts his proposal. Note: This episode includes a joke referencing Melissa O'Neil's victory on the third season of Canadian Idol.
37	17	"Control"	Marcus Stokes	Alexi Hawley & Robert Bella	April 12, 2020	217	4.57
Nolan and Harper encounter Nolan's former C.I. Bianca, and she tells them that Ripper has returned with a large shipment of fentanyl. DEA Agent Michael Banks (Bailey Chase) arrives and they determine that Nolan and Harper must go in disguise to confront Ripper. They successfully agree to meet with Ripper, but everything goes wrong when Bianca confronts Ripper and tells him about the operation, but she is abducted. Meanwhile, Lucy meets a firefighter, Emmett, during a call and is intrigued by him. Lopez also interrogates a bank teller after a woman is murdered, and clashes with Detective Calderon on how the case should be handled. Banks offers Harper a job with the DEA after they successfully rescue and arrest Bianca, but she respectfully declines his offer.
38	18	"Under the Gun"	Tori Garrett	Terence Paul Winter & Elizabeth Davis Beall	April 26, 2020	218	4.96
Nolan and Harper are tasked with escorting four juvenile delinquents to a correctional facility, but find themselves entrapped in a prison riot during their processing. The pair find themselves forced to make an unlikely alliance with Oscar Hutchinson in order to safely evacuate their detainees from the prison, as well as saving the warden from the hostage situation. Meanwhile, Rachel and Tim have to rectify a mistake that caused a mother to lose custody of her ailing child after learning that a compromised water system was the cause of his sickness. Lopez and Jackson have to escort a tech analyst who has flagged Lopez as an officer most likely to cause problems in the department, and also have to subdue an active shooter at the tech analyst's office building.
39	19	"The Q Word"	David McWhirter	Natalie Callaghan & Nick Hurwitz	May 3, 2020	219	5.00
When a fellow rookie colleague Chris Rios (Christopher O'Shea) is fatally shot in broad daylight by a member of the Derian crime family, the entire police department commences a manhunt where multiple complications arise. Tim and Lucy raid the gunman's house and learn that an L.A.P.D. officer is on the crime family's payroll; Nolan and Harper recover the murder weapon from the crime scene, but find out it is stolen after a raid on Ruben Derian's residence; Jackson deals with the aftermath of Chris's death at the hospital while Lopez attempts to search for the mole. While viewing through the officers' body camera footage, Lopez learns that rookie officer Erin Cole (Hannah Kasulka) did not have her body camera function at all during her shift, with the Wilshire precinct conducting another manhunt on Erin. Nolan encounters a guilt-ridden Erin by himself and learns that she was the actual target of the assassination attempt, with Chris being collateral damage. Despite Nolan's successful attempt in calming her down, Erin is fatally shot by Armstrong. During the aftermath and inspired by a recent conversation with Harper, Nolan reviews his body camera footage and deduces that Armstrong was the actual mole working for the Derian family, and was working with (and betrayed) Erin.
40	20	"The Hunt"	Bill Roe	Alexi Hawley	May 10, 2020	220	4.66
Harper agrees to help Nolan after he shows her the footage. They lead Armstrong to an abandoned house to pick up his burner phone's signal in order to tap its records, but discover he had tossed it. Nolan talks to Rosalind, who reveals that, after Armstrong had broken into her house to secure evidence to arrest her, she broke into his and found a stash of guns, cash, and files that incriminate Armstrong. Nolan breaks into Armstrong's house and locates it before escaping, but Armstrong sees him as he departs. He alerts Serj Derian, who is arrested after a raid on his house. Armstrong invites Nolan back to his house, explaining that he got in too deep with the Derians once the costs for his deceased wife's medical bills became too much for him to handle. Armstrong reveals that he plans to incriminate Nolan as the mole before Nolan incapacitates Armstrong in a shootout, who reveals that he planted his stash in Nolan's house as Serj tells Grey that Nolan is the mole. Nolan finds the stash hidden inside a wall in his bedroom. Nolan is left standing in his bedroom as the police close in on him.
