= The Rookie series 1 =

First series of The Rookie

The Rookie
- Series 1
- Starring: Nathan Fillion; Alyssa Diaz; Richard T. Jones; Titus Makin Jr.; Mercedes Mason; Melissa O'Neil; Eric Winter; Afton Williamson
- No. of episodes: 20

Release
- Original release: October 16, 2018 – April 16, 2019

Series chronology
- Next → Series 2

The first season of the American police procedural television series The Rookie premiered on ABC on 16 October 2018, and concluded on 16 April 2019.

The season consists of 20 episodes and follows John Nolan (Nathan Fillion), a 45-year-old man who decides to pursue a new career as a police officer with the Los Angeles Police Department (LAPD). Following a life-changing experience, Nolan leaves his previous life behind and moves to Los Angeles to attend the police academy.

After graduating, he is assigned to the Mid-Wilshire Division, where he begins his career alongside fellow rookie officers Lucy Chen (Melissa O'Neil), and Jackson West (Titus Makin Jr).

== Cast ==
- Nathan Fillion as John Nolan
- Alyssa Diaz as Angela Lopez
- Richard T. Jones as Wade Grey
- Titus Makin Jr. as Jackson West
- Melissa O'Neil as Lucy Chen
- Eric Winter as Tim Bradford
- Mercedes Mason as Zoe Andersen
- Afton Williamson as Talia Bishop

== Episodes ==
No. overall	No. in season	Title	Directed by	Written by	Original release date	Prod. code	U.S. viewers (millions)
1	1	"Pilot"	Liz Friedlander	Alexi Hawley	October 16, 2018	101	5.43
Nine months after foiling a bank robbery in Foxburg, Pennsylvania, John Nolan, a 45-year-old divorcé, moves to Los Angeles and becomes a police officer. His assignment to the Mid-Wilshire Division of the LAPD is met with skepticism, particularly his watch commander, Sergeant Wade Grey. Nolan and his fellow rookie officers, Jackson West and Lucy Chen, are assigned to Training Officers (TO) Talia Bishop, Angela Lopez, and Tim Bradford, respectively. Jackson is son of a high-ranking LAPD Internal Affairs officer and eager to live up to the family legacy. Lucy, who became a cop against the wishes of her therapist parents, is carrying on a secret affair with Nolan despite the risk it poses to her career. Sergeant Grey tells Nolan that he will do everything in his power to discourage Nolan from continuing, as he fears Nolan's inexperience and age will endanger his officers. When Nolan replies that he believes being a cop might be his calling, Grey says then nothing he puts Nolan through will deter him.
2	2	"Crash Course"	Adam Davidson	Alexi Hawley	October 23, 2018	102	4.54
Nolan continues to face difficulties in navigating between his civilian instincts and how they affect his actions as a cop. Jackson is questioned as to why he didn't fire his weapon in a previous call, but Lopez covers for him then forces him to handle the arrest of a man on PCP, which he pulls off. Lucy is stuck with a lazy new training officer while Tim recovers from a gunshot wound, and winds up arresting a man for shoplifting. A kidnapping victim is rescued; while apprehending him, Talia stops Nolan from beating the suspect in a rage. Captain Zoe Andersen reminds him that it is not his job to punish criminals. Lucy finds out that Tim intentionally got her assigned to a poor officer to test her commitment.
3	3	"The Good, the Bad and the Ugly"	Greg Beeman	Liz Alper & Ally Seibert	October 30, 2018	103	4.53
Nolan and Talia chase a group of thieves and Nolan loses a bag of stolen money when a street performer runs off with it. The precinct learns that the thieves are part of a gang who have pulled off a string of heists and they begin searching for the remaining gang members. Meanwhile, Lucy helps Tim as he readjusts to being back on duty while also trying to help his drug addicted wife Isabel, who reveals to Lucy she was once a narcotics cop. Elsewhere, an arrest of a former college athlete causes Jackson and Lopez to talk about alternative careers to police work since Lopez still doubts Jackson's ability to handle the job.
4	4	"The Switch"	Toa Fraser	Vincent Angell	November 13, 2018	104	4.01
Sgt. Grey tests the rookies by assigning them new TOs, partnering Nolan with Lopez, Jackson with Tim, and Lucy with Talia. He tasks the rookies with gaining insight into their new TOs. Lopez takes Nolan to court and Nolan ends up chasing an escaped prisoner, leading to a potentially career-making bust for the pair. Tim, however, learns about Jackson's struggles when he freezes during a shootout and enraged, confronts Lopez over it. Tim later takes Jackson to meet an agoraphobe who gives Jackson advice on facing his fears. Meanwhile, Lucy defends her relationship with Nolan to Talia during their patrol, prompting Nolan and Lucy to have a talk about their relationship.
5	5	"The Roundup"	Nelson McCormick	Elizabeth Davis Beall	November 20, 2018	106	4.10
Nolan struggles to deal with his breakup with Lucy just as the TOs start an annual competition to see who can get the most arrests in a single shift. Tim plays to win, even bribing a dispatcher to get the best calls, which worries Lucy. Meanwhile, Jackson dives headfirst into the competition to prove himself while Nolan and Talia, who is refusing to play, find themselves dealing with a mob-connected banker.
6	6	"The Hawke"	Timothy Busfield	Fredrick Kotto	November 27, 2018	105	4.38
Upon learning that his former academy instructor, Jeremy Hawke, has fallen on hard times, Nolan offers to help him out. Jeremy politely declines but, the next morning, Lopez and Jackson answer a call from Jeremy's estranged wife. She claims Jeremy has become unstable and dangerous. Nolan and Talia get involved in the pursuit of Jeremy, which quickly escalates. Then, they discover Jeremy has his son with him, who is willingly participating with his father's fugitive activities. Meanwhile, Jackson and Lopez deal with a shooting victim and his father, both of whom they suspect aren't telling them the whole truth and Tim tries to teach Lucy to anticipate the behavior of criminals.
7	7	"The Ride Along"	Cherie Nowlan	Robert Bella	December 4, 2018	107	4.20
Nolan and Talia are assigned Hollywood director Rupert Payne, of whom Nolan is a fan, for a ride along to research his new film. Despite orders to keep him away from any dangerous situations, Rupert observes Nolan and Talia deescalate a situation involving a mentally impaired young man from a troubled neighborhood, which leads to a dangerous situation when Rupert tries to help the young man's family. Meanwhile, Jackson informs Lopez that she is being considered for detective, which prompts Lopez to attempt leveraging smaller criminals into giving up a major player, which ultimately backfires. Elsewhere, Tim's wife Isabel is arrested in a drug bust, forcing Tim to choose, once and for all, between his devotion to Isabel and his duty as a cop.
8	8	"Time of Death"	Mike Goi	Brynn Malone	December 11, 2018	108	4.27
While in pursuit of a robber, Nolan fatally shoots him in self defense. The episode centers on the processing of this event. Tim's wife Isabel is returning to be a CI. While trying to get evidence against a major drug trafficker, the connection to her wire is lost and Talia and Tim find the camera and blood upon searching the apartment. Isabel seems to have been taken by the drug traffickers. Lucy gives Nolan a ride home from the precinct and they sleep together. While Lucy is in the shower, the brother of the robber attacks Nolan. The episode ends with Nolan's attacker holding a gun on Nolan and a shot fired off camera.
9	9	"Standoff"	John Terlesky	Alexi Hawley	January 8, 2019	109	3.95
Nolan manages to fight off his attacker and calls for backup; he is assigned to desk duty during the investigation of his attack. Tim, Lopez, and Talia find Isabel, who has been shot in the head but will survive. Tim, Lucy, Jackson, Lopez, Talia, and Detectives Wolfe and Vestri hunt down Vance, the drug dealer who shot Isabel and left her for dead, and end up in a shootout with Vance and his men. The other officers, including Nolan, Commander Percy West, and the SWAT team arrive and arrest Vance and his men. Nolan lies about his affair with Lucy to Percy, who later informs Nolan that he has been cleared of all charges and can return to the police force immediately.
10	10	"Flesh and Blood"	Jessica Yu	Inda Craig-Galvan	January 15, 2019	110	3.83
Henry Nolan comes to visit his dad, who is surprised to learn that Jackson and Lucy already know Henry through social media. At morning roll call, Andersen announces she will ride along with Lucy, while Grey will partner with Nolan, and Tim and Talia will partner with each other. Grey's daughter Dominique also shows up unexpectedly for an internship. Henry and Dominique bond over their concern over their dads' work, and Tim and Talia clash over procedure, as each is used to being the boss of their rookie. The episode ends with Nolan and his son talking about Nolan's job. Henry worries about the danger he is in. Nolan agrees to text his son at the end of each day with a code word to let him know he is okay.
11	11	"Redwood"	Sylvain White	Ally Seibert & Liz Alper	January 22, 2019	111	3.84
The officers are forced to come in to work on their day off, as the Vice President has made an unexpected visit to Los Angeles. While breaking up a fight between two homeless women, Lucy gets pricked by a used needle and has to be tested to see if she was exposed to various diseases; Tim tries to comfort. Lopez and Jackson try to break up protestors and tell people who have obscene banners to take them down. Nolan and Talia engage in a shootout with several robbery suspects; when Lopez and Jackson defy Agent Danvers' orders and go help Talia and Nolan, Grey defends them, saying it was the right thing to do. Lucy gets good news about her test results. Jackson tells Lucy about his family problems. Nolan sells his house in Pennsylvania.
12	12	"Heartbreak"	Carol Banker	Vincent Angell	February 12, 2019	113	3.64
The evening before Valentine's Day, the rookies have dinner at the same location as Grey and his wife Luna. Nolan steps in when a man harasses a woman at the bar, causing a commotion that ruins Grey's evening. On Valentine's Day, Tim takes a day off to meet up with Isabel, who is in rehab, and ends their relationship, telling Isabel that she'll never move past who she was as an addict if they remain together. After having her life saved by Nolan, a recently widowed woman tries everything to get together with Nolan, even cozying up to Ben. Lopez and Jackson interrogate an alleged victim who claims to suffer from dementia, but turns out to be a dangerous criminal. Jackson hits it off with a male nurse. Lopez searches her boyfriend Wesley Evers' smartphone, assuming he cheats on her, but it turns out to be different than what she had thought. Nolan arranges a party for his first Valentine's Day as a single person in a long time and is surprised when Talia attends.
13	13	"Caught Stealing"	Omar Madha	David Radcliff	February 19, 2019	112	3.54
Responding to a car accident, Talia and Nolan find a stabbing victim who flees the scene before turning up at the station, claiming to be an undercover LAPD officer investigating a drug cartel that plans to transfer one million dollars that night. When the LAPD raids the home and stops the transfer, the rookies are left to guard the money until the counters arrive. The next morning, the rookies are informed that $250,000 is missing; the rookies are interrogated before being cleared. Lucy is ambushed by the cartel while driving; Nolan and Jackson rush to her aid. Meanwhile, the cartel boss catches up to Lucy and demands to know where she hid the stolen money. Lucy recognizes his boots as belonging to a man she saw leaving the house before the raid with a large duffel bag, and accuses the boss of stealing the money himself. The boss shoots his men and scuffles with Lucy before she and Nolan subdue him. Andersen visits the officer in the hospital and arrests him for having tipped off the boss. To avoid possible issues from taking financial advantage of his job, Nolan agrees to pay Ben what he can for his apartment.
14	14	"Plain Clothes Day"	Mike Goi	Terence Paul Winter	February 26, 2019	114	3.89
The rookies undergo Plain Clothes Day, where their TOs ride along out of uniform and do not assist in any capacity. Jackson is eager to break his father's records but gets stuck working behind a desk after their patrol car breaks down before departing; he eventually overcomes his frustrations and helps the widow of murder victim Richard Ocheda by returning her husband's watch to her. After responding to a noise complaint about a dog, the dog owner files a complaint about Lucy for threatening him; she later redeems herself by arresting the dog owner for murdering the woman who filed the noise complaint. While stopped at a hotel, Nolan dismissed a distressed woman with questions about credit card tracking, only to later find her to be a kidnapping victim of her abusive and violent husband. Talia decides to assist Nolan, while he distracts the husband, eventually arresting the husband and freeing the woman.
15	15	"Manhunt"	Bill Johnson	Robert Bella	March 5, 2019	115	4.51
A prisoner transport crashes while on the road and several violent criminals are on the loose in suburban Los Angeles. After tending the wounds of wounded deputy, Nolan is attacked by one of the prisoners, but quickly subdues him before Lopez and Jackson arrive. Tim and Lucy capture another prisoner on the loose in a neighborhood, and also clash with a local militia. Jackson and Lopez capture Oscar Hutchison in a parking garage. At the station, Oscar makes subtle hints that Jackson's father Percy was corrupt earlier in his career, which Jackson subsequently dismisses. Nolan and Talia inspect vehicles going into a neighborhood, and Nolan discovers one vehicle where the driver seems distressed. One of the prisoners is revealed to be hiding in the vehicle's trunk holding the driver's daughter hostage. Nolan chooses to let the driver go and, when he arrives home and pulls into the garage, the police are waiting and prisoner is arrested. Tim and Lucy, along with Tim's informant Deacon, find the last prisoner, Marcos Gibson, and protects him from angry members of the 5–4 gang, until backup arrives. Nolan single handedly tackles a hostage situation with Caleb Jost, the second last prisoner, based on advice from Jessica Russo. Tim also decides to start taking his sergeant exams.
16	16	"Greenlight"	Valerie Weiss	Brynn Malone	March 19, 2019	116	4.24
Internal Affairs is conducting random integrity tests at the precinct to ensure officers are following procedure. Nolan arrests an unruly woman and her dress's shoulder strap accidentally breaks, embarrassing her. After a gunman attempts to kill Nolan that evening, Nolan learns a hit has been put on his life by the unruly woman's boyfriend Cole Midas, whose father Leonard is the leader of a violent white supremacist gang, the Southern Front. After some soul-searching, Nolan returns to work the next morning and is partnered with Captain Andersen. Officers seize millions of the gang's assets as leverage to get Leonard to call off the hit, which works. However, Cole and his men capture Nolan and Andersen. Although Andersen frees herself and saves Nolan, she is fatally shot by a fleeing Cole. Nolan sits with Andersen's corpse as Tim, Talia, Lucy, Lopez, Jackson, and the other LAPD members arrive. The officers salute Andersen. Later, Grey revisits Leonard and demands he hand over his son. At the end, an ambush is set, and Cole is arrested by Nolan.
17	17	"The Shake Up"	Steve Robin	Alexi Hawley	March 26, 2019	117	4.24
Jessica arranges for Nolan, accompanied by Tim, to be put on a protective detail for a former border patrol guard who became a human trafficker. Grey struggles with the orders issued by the new captain, while Jackson deals with relationship issues. Lucy and Talia save a young man from a brutal exorcism performed by his mother, but Lucy confronts her father, a therapist whose arm was broken by a patient. She is forced to arrest him, causing disappointment from her father. However, she redeems herself by having the patient transferred to the help he needs. An earthquake then rocks the city, leaving Grey to try to coordinate the city's response while Nolan and Tim are attacked at the safehouse. It turns out that their human trafficker had a GPS tracker on him, which led the cartel to the safehouse and subsequently the beach which Nolan and Tim brought him to.
18	18	"Homefront"	April Mullen	Bill Rinier & Natalie Callaghan	April 2, 2019	118	3.91
Nolan comes under fire after a man claims Nolan used excessive force and inflicted an injury, and he is assigned to the youngest lawyer, Simon Parks Jr. (Robbie Kay), available for his case. A detective is also investigated and arrested by Internal Affairs. This causes three criminals to be released from prison early. Lopez and Jackson take the case of Samantha Bennett, while Tim and Lucy check in on Max Kegel, and Nolan and Talia investigate Terry Wright. Terry recognizes Talia, as his associate Dylan Scott is Talia's former foster brother. Dylan and Terry later kidnap Talia after she tries to arrest them, leading to Nolan leaving his court hearing early. Dylan kills Terry after Terry attempts to kill Talia, and Talia admits to Grey that she lied about Dylan being her foster brother when applying to the academy. Jackson also confronts his father Percy about the latter being a dirty cop, which strains their relationship when Jackson learns that is not true.
19	19	"The Checklist"	John Fortenberry	Elizabeth Davis Beall & Fredrick Kotto	April 9, 2019	119	3.63
A few days before the rookies' final exam, Tim and Lopez reveal that Lucy and Jackson still have seven and three types of crime to witness, respectively, and must do so in the next 48 hours. Since Nolan has no outstanding crimes, he is assigned to desk duty while Talia goes before Internal Affairs, but he asks to work with Wolfe instead. While on the streets, Lucy and Jackson come across Ben, who was the latest victim of a car theft ring. Nolan ends up helping to catch the thieves, and tries to plead Talia's case in front of Internal Affairs. The episode ends with Talia being offered an opportunity to become a mole for IA, and Nolan telling Ben both about the trauma he suffered after the bank robbery seen in the Pilot episode, and how he got over it.
20	20	"Free Fall"	Mike Goi	Alexi Hawley	April 16, 2019	120	4.06
On the day of an important rookie exam, an isolated terrorist cell plot to use a weaponized virus threatens to derail the rookies' advancement as well as put strain on Nolan's personal relationships. While responding to the threat, Tim may be infected with the virus, while Jessica shoots a surrendering terrorist, straining her relationship with Nolan. Meanwhile, Lopez and Jackson also save several people on a bus by apprehending a second terrorist, which allows Jackson to make amends with his father regarding their previous argument. Once the virus has been contained, Tim is given a dose of the experimental vaccine, but then collapses after leaving the house.
