= John Nolan (The Rookie) =

The Rookie character

- The Rookie character
- First appearance: "Pilot"; 16 October 2018
- Created by: Alexi Hawley
- Portrayed by: Nathan Fillion

In-universe information
- Gender: Male
- Occupation: Police officer Builder
- Spouses: Sarah Nolan (backstory); Bailey Nune (Season 6 onwards)
- Significant others: Lucy Chen; Jessica Russo; Grace Sawyer
- Children: Henry Nolan (son)
- Relatives: Charles Nolan (father); Evelyn Nolan (mother); Pete Nolan (half-brother)
- Nationality: American

Jonathan "John" Nolan is a fictional character from the American television series The Rookie. John is portrayed by actor Nathan Fillion in the series. The character of Nolan is based on a real life LAPD rookie who was over the age of 37. The character has featured in multiple storylines including taking a life within a month on the job, relationships with fellow rookie Lucy Chen, Homeland Security officer Jessica Russo, doctor Grace Sawyer and firefighter/soldier Bailey Nune the latter of which he married in the second episode of the sixth season. Other major storylines have included being set up as corrupt by dirty cop Nick Armstrong, going back to school in order to get a degree to become a training officer, becoming a union representative and successfully becoming a field training officer. Fillion has appeared in every episode of The Rookie in addition to 3 episodes of The Rookie: Feds and will make an appearance in upcoming spin-off The Rookie: North.

== Creation and development ==
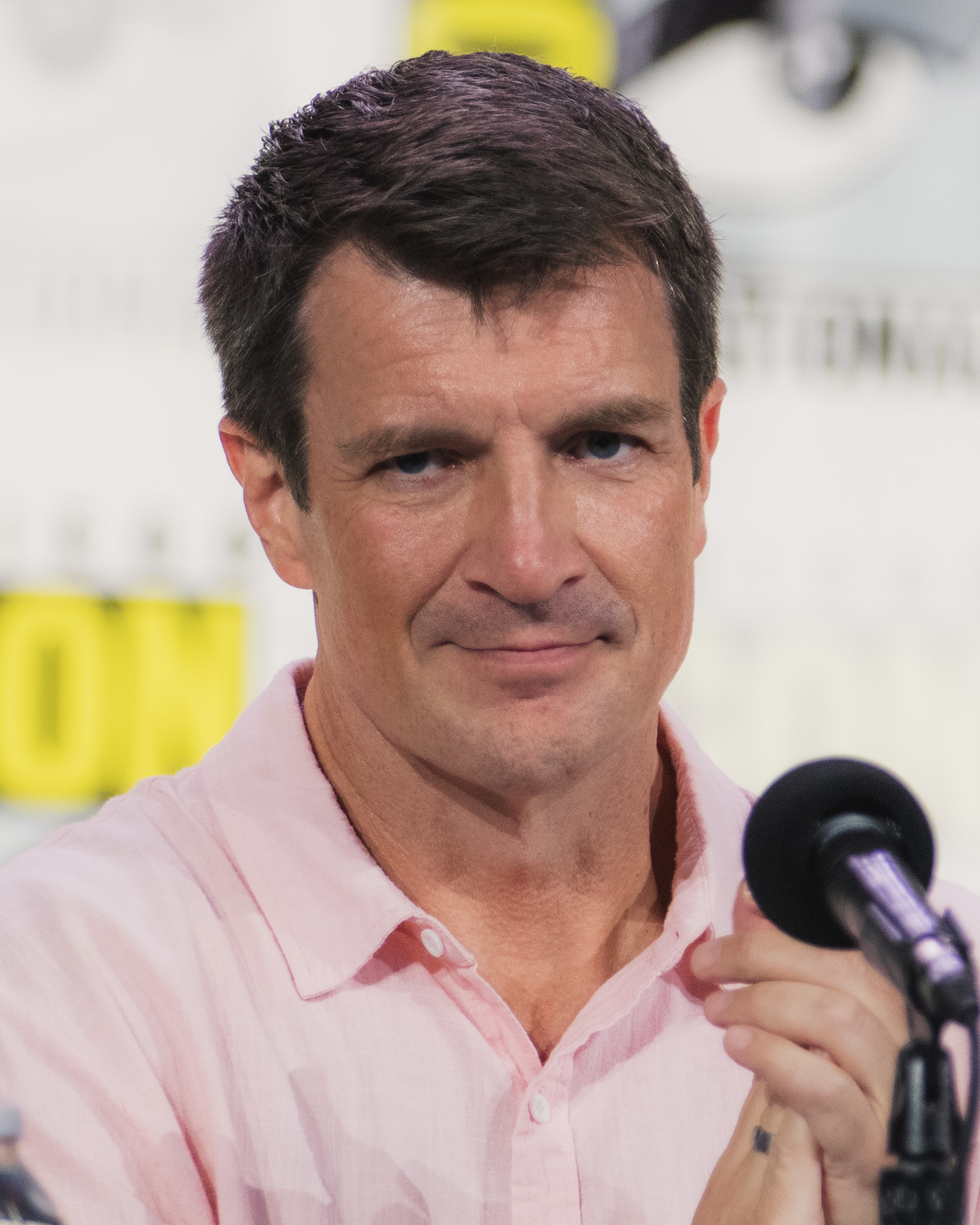
Nathan Fillion who portrays John Nolan

When the series was announced, the details of John was given as "Fillion plays John Nolan, the oldest rookie in the LAPD. At an age where most are at the peak of their career, Nolan cast aside his comfortable, small town life and moved to L.A. to pursue his dream of being a cop. Now, surrounded by rookies twenty years his junior, Nolan must navigate the dangerous, humorous and unpredictable world of a “young” cop, determined to make his second shot at life count."

It was further discussed how Nolan's character was based on real life LAPD officer William Norcross who serves as an executive producer on the series.

In an interview with The Hollywood Reporter, Fillion told Marisa Roffman the reasons he signed on to The Rookie without a script as "It was the pitch. You want a character you feel you can serve — you can serve the character, serve the story. Being in the business as long as I have, I’ve broadened my scope. And the core idea of the show, it has to be something strong enough to carry it a number of years. You want the potential for more. You don’t want to hit a roadblock where you’ve run out of stories because our engine isn’t built that way. This one has an engine. [John Nolan] is literally starting his life over, from scratch. He has an incredible history behind him, but he’s starting everything brand new. It’s a very attractive prospect that people can relate to."

When Melissa O'Neil was cast as Lucy Chen, it was announced that she was a love interest for Nolan, it was reported "O’Neil will play Lucy, a rookie cop in the LAPD who struggles with a domineering training officer and might be developing a budding romance with Nolan."

In a TV Line interview, Hawley discussed the plans for Jenna Dewan to be the love interest for Nolan by saying "Absolutely. I think Jen is another coup for us, so yeah, that's my plan. We couldn't really do a ton of love interest stuff during the middle of the pandemic, but at the end of the day it felt like, "Let's find him somebody to potentially take us into next season. And Jen is really special, and I love the character."

== Storylines ==
=== Season One ===
John is first seen at a bank in his hometown Foxburg, Pennsylvania placing his wedding ring and divorce papers in a storage box before the bank gets ambushed by robbers. During the robbery John bravely confronts the robbers in the hope to stop the robbery until the police arrive. After this John decides he wants to become a police officer and goes to the training academy. After nine months of training John is placed at the Mid-Wiltshire station with fellow rookies Lucy Chen (Melissa O'Neil) and Jackson West (Titus Makin Jr.). During the first roll call he learns that he will be placed under the supervision of Talia Bishop (Afton Williamson) and gets told by Sergeant Wade Grey (Richard T. Jones) that Wade isn’t comfortable with John being a rookie police officer due to his age. John quickly learns how his age can cause issues when keeping up with his fellow younger officers and younger criminals alike but he uses his age and wisdom to navigate situations showing some empathy along the way and proving himself to be a loyal friend and colleague.

One month into becoming a police officer, John and Talia respond to a call where a shopkeeper is being robbed by two brothers Kyle and Alex Montgomery (Sam Duffy & Sam Lenz), Alex leads Nolan on a foot chase which leads into a family's home and when Alex moves his gun in Nolan's direction, Nolan fires a single shot killing Alex instantly. What follows shows Nolan suffering PTSD in the immediate aftermath of the shooting and during his interviews with Internal Affairs led by Commander Percy West (Michael Beach). Grey supports Nolan during this time and eventually Nolan gets cleared in the shooting.

During the episode "Green Light" while in the process of arresting a woman for disorderly behaviour, Nolan accidentally causes her a wardrobe malfunction unbeknownst to him that the woman is the girlfriend of a gangster who places a hit out on Nolan. When Nolan still shows up for work he receives a standing ovation where it is decided by Captain Zoe Anderson (Mercedes Mason) that she will ride along with Nolan and act as his training officer while Grey goes to the gangster's father in prison to get the hit rescinded. Despite Grey being successful, Nolan and Anderson are kidnapped by the gangster, Cole Midas. Nolan tries to reason with Cole but he pushes Anderson into a pool while she is tied to a chair where she does manage to break free of her restraints but after a brief shootout Cole kills Anderson by a shot to the neck. The following day, Grey instructs Nolan to arrest Midas after a stand off and on the journey back to the station, Grey reveals to Nolan how Anderson had requested him to be placed at Mid-Wiltshire.

Nolan starts a relationship with Homeland Security agent Jessica Russo (Sarah Shahi) whom he meets during a hostage negotiation training exercise and where she assists him in apprehending escaped convicts after a prison bus crash. Russo asks Nolan to help her friend assistant district attorney Sean Del Monte (Michael Trucco) by being a protective detail for a former United States Border Patrol officer Brad Hayes (Joel McHale) who is giving evidence as a witness. Bishop doesn’t want to be on the protection detail so Tim Bradford (Eric Winter) decides to take on the training of Nolan for this job. Del Monte not realising that Nolan is a rookie believes Nolan is in charge admits his mistake by mentioning Russo previously dated a Navy SEAL. After an earthquake Hayes attacks Nolan in an attempt to escape but Nolan manages to subdue him and handcuff him. It is then revealed that there is people coming to Hayes where Nolan and Bradford have to escape the safe house with Hayes. After escaping to a beach, they learn that Hayes was in on the attack on the safe house where they then manage to stop the gunmen and fully apprehend Hayes.

Sometime later Nolan learns that Bishop has been keeping a foster brother secret which is against regulations with the LAPD and he interrupts her disciplinary hearing to give words in support of her. After this he learns that there is a bio-weapon made of a weaponised strain of hemorrhagic fever that has been brought into Los Angeles and is concerned when he finds out that Russo knew and didn’t warn him when he mentioned his son was coming to visit. During a chase and subsequent shoot out with one of the terrorists he believes him to be willing to surrender but Russo shoots him dead saying that she saw him reaching for a gun. Nolan then goes to a house where Tim got exposed by the bio-weapon where it appears a cure has worked but Tim collapses in front of him, Chen, Lopez (Alyssa Diaz) and West.

=== Season Two ===
Following the ambulance carrying Tim, to the hospital, an unknown assailant involved in the bio-weapon incident started shooting at the police where Nolan alongside Lucy, Angela and Jackson returned fire until Tim jumped out of the ambulance and shot the assailant in the arm so she could be apprehended. It is then revealed two weeks later that Talia departed off-screen and Nolan was awaiting to hear whom his new training officer would be. While having no set training officer John goes on patrol with Wade, Angela and new detective Nick Armstrong (Harold Perrineau) whom he forms a close friendship with. It’s revealed in the fourth episode "Guardians and Gladiators" that John will be trained by (formerly undercover) Detective Nyla Harper (Mekia Cox) who instantly takes a disliking to him due to the issue he talks too much to strangers and has a guardian mentality but gradually she grows to appreciate him both as a friend and trainee. Nolan also re-encounters former flame Grace Sawyer (Ali Larter) who is now a doctor at the local hospital.

On his first court appearance as a police officer, John testified on a drink driving case where the defendant is represented by Lopez's boyfriend (later fiancée and husband) Wesley Evers (Shawn Ashmore). During the testimony an alert goes off declaring a missile is coming to Los Angeles and everybody panics. Jessica who’s in the courtroom gallery supporting Nolan uses her credentials to try and calm everyone down. She asks the judge (Jim Ortlieb) in the case if there is a fallout shelter which he denies but while Wesley is talking to Lopez on John's radio they learn that is not the case. They notice the judge, court reporter and some members of the gallery have disappeared so Jessica, John and Wesley bring the other people left behind and the prisoners down to the shelter where the judge points a gun at John refusing to let him in. John overpowers him and removes the gun and arrests him. One of the prisoners Oscar Hutchison (Matthew Glave) orchestrates a takeover with another prisoner Jonathan Ryland (Dayo Ade). Nolan is forced to non-fatally shoot Ryland but Oscar has taken the judge hostage with a scalpel from a first aid kit. As he tries opening the shelter, Lopez and West arrive to declare that the alert was a false alarm and apprehend Oscar. Lopez looks for Wesley and finds that he’s been stabbed by Oscar. Back at the station, Nolan learns the reason that Harper is back in uniform when she and ex-husband Donovan Town (Enver Gjokaj) are fighting over her taking their daughter Lila (Carsyn Rose) against the custody arrangements. He defends Harper to Donovan who backs off. Later at the hospital Nolan along with the others await news on Wesley.

After a pregnancy scare, John and Jessica break up due to the fact she wants to have a baby but John isn’t ready to have another child due to him being at the start of his career as a police officer.

During the season, Nolan meets female serial killer Rosalind Dyer (Annie Wersching) on a case where she is leading the authorities to the remains of some of her victims. John learns that Dyer has a history with Armstrong owing to the fact he arrested her for her crimes. During the course of the case, Dyer takes a liking to Nolan due to the fact he protected her when a family member of one of her victims tries to kill her. During the excursion they learn that there’s new bodies in her dump sites. Dyer is less than forthcoming with information about who the bodies are and who killed them but by the next morning Nolan learns that she had a protege called Caleb (Michael Cassidy) who kidnapped Chen the night before planning to bury her alive. Nolan and Harper go visit Dyer in prison but she doesn’t give any information. Lopez works out where the house Chen was taken to was and informs Nolan and Harper where they respond and learn how Caleb has also taken Armstrong. Due to Caleb refusing to surrender Harper is forced to shoot him where he dies despite Nolan, Armstrong and Harper trying to save his life with the help from Grace on video call. When Caleb dies, they go to try and locate Chen which the successfully do and rescue her barely alive. Dyer then rings Nolan on a burner phone from prison and hints about Armstrong not being who Nolan thinks he is.

In the aftermath of Chen's kidnapping, Nolan is briefly partnered with Bradford while Harper helps Chen during which, Nolan's son Henry requests his father to take his girlfriend Abigail (Madeline Coughlan) on a drive along as she is considering being a police officer where they go to what appears to be a suicide where she is a little too eager to be involved, they then warn her how the death notification will be emotionally hard. Due to her past committing arson, when Bradford finds out he advises Nolan that she won’t have a chance of being a police officer.

A couple weeks later, Nolan is informed that his father who he’s been estranged to for years has died and left him a car which is delivered to him by his half brother Pete (Pete Davidson) who Nolan knew nothing about. Not long after delivering the car, Pete steals it and drives away. Nolan then learns that his identity has been stolen by a man called Jordan Neil (Seth Green) where it puts Nolan at risk of losing his job due to being susceptible to bribes as it destroyed his credit score and made him unable to pay Henry's tuition.

Weeks later on a quiet shift, Nolan and Harper join a police chase which results in a colleague from another station being shot and killed, working the case as normal, Nolan learns that there is a dirty cop in the force. It is revealed that it’s a rookie from the academy at the same time as him, Erin Cole (Hannah Kasulka) who is the dirty cop but in her final moments before being shot dead by Armstrong she names Armstrong when Nolan had asked if there was anyone else. Replaying it in his head he begins to suspect Armstrong of being dirty and takes his suspicions to Harper who advises him to be careful with investigating it. Nolan decides he needs to visit Dyer to revisit their last conversation where she reveals that Armstrong illegally searched her house before arresting her and in turn she explored his house including a hidden compartment in a wall. Breaking into Armstrong's house, Nolan finds what Dyer said was there but he is nearly caught as Armstrong arrived home early. Armstrong later lures Nolan back to his house under the guise of coming clean but instead tries to murder Nolan but is shot in the shoulder himself when Nolan returns fire. Laughing at Nolan in pain, Armstrong admits to planting evidence at Nolan's house. Nolan rushes home and destroys the walls in his house trying to find the planted material as the police sirens arrive at his house, Nolan discovers the planted material behind his bed headboard in a cut out in his wall.

=== Season Three ===
In the season premiere episode, Nolan is phoned by Grey about the accusations by Armstrong, Nolan demands Grey get a warrant to access his house and then hangs up the phone. Nolan rings Harper to warn her about Armstrong who unbeknownst to him is also accusing Harper of being corrupt. After ringing Harper he rings Wesley, to represent him which Wesley agrees. When the warrant arrives Nolan surrenders peacefully and is taken to the station to await interview. Wesley advises him to remain silent but Nolan refuses due to wanting to keep his job as a police officer. Nolan pleads to go undercover to get the people Armstrong was in league with to prove his innocence. When taken to a secluded location, Nolan finds out that Armstrong had already warned the crime family against Nolan but they still murder Armstrong. After a brief cat and mouse chase, Nolan apprehends the crime family and alerts police to his location. Back at the station, it’s revealed that he and Harper will get letters of reprimand on their records and he has been extended in the FTO program for an extra month which will derail any chance of promotions. Once back home, Dyer rings him on a burner from prison and she makes a comment about appealing her convictions due to Armstrong's corruption.

Part of the continuing punishment for Nolan going off the books in investigating Armstrong, Grey sends him and Harper to work in a local community centre where they meet James Murray (Arjay Smith) who is initially distrustful of them as he believes they are only there due to the scandal that recently came about due to Armstrong's corruption. Nolan helps reopen and repair a disused play park which softens James's misgivings about Nolan.

Nolan's mother, Evelyn (Frances Fisher) unexpectedly arrives and immediately causes trouble. She pawns the engagement ring from Danny Hill (Markus Flanagan) after breaking off the engagement, trying to feed Nolan nuts being oblivious to his nut allergy, convincing Luna into buying into her business of CBD oil which turns out to be a substance that causes rashes and infuriates Grey where Nolan is left to pay Luna back.

Weeks later, Nolan has to redo an exam to stay on as a police officer, after passing the exam he gets taken hostage outside the station by a man called Graham (Josh Stewart) who claims to have a van filled with explosives. Graham forces Nolan to radio Grey so he can issue his demands which then are revealed to be a diversion so Graham's girlfriend Kelsey (Ashley Jones) can steal evidence from the station's evidence room. It is then revealed that there is no explosives so Nolan is able to arrest Graham and bring him in. Hours later in the aftermath of an attack on Jackson which his training officer Doug Stanton (Brandon Routh) watched happen from a distance, Nolan and Harper discuss the potential of him becoming a training officer so he can be a better officer than Stanton, Harper mentions that if Nolan has a college credit he could become a training officer quicker than without so he decides to return to college.

Starting night classes, Nolan feels conflicted about disclosing to his fellow students that he is a police officer, which he doesn’t at that time but the following day one of the students in his class spots Nolan in uniform while Nolan was working security at an undercover officer's seminar. That evening in class he is shunned by his fellow students who believe that he should’ve informed them but their teacher Fiona Ryan (Toks Olagundoye) has them write essays as to why they believe Nolan should’ve or shouldn’t have mentioned he was a police officer.

Nolan struggles with being held back an extra month in the FTO program while Jackson and Lucy graduate. It is exacerbated when his friend Ben reveals that Henry is quitting college to join Ben's non-profit. Later on a visit Henry collapses due to his condition of Tetralogy of Fallot. Nolan, Abigail and his ex-wife Sarah (Emily Deschanel) are at Henry's beside. Henry gets offered two surgery options, Abigail and Sarah want him to take the safest of the two which requires him to face it again in five years instead of the riskier one which would give him a better chance. Henry wants the riskier one but passes out again before telling the doctor, Nolan respects Henry's wishes and the surgery is successful. Sometime later Nolan and Bradford are paired up where Bradford is skeptical about Nolan's plans to be a training officer due to his dreams to be a detective being dashed, but Nolan reaffirms to Bradford that he will be a training officer.

Nolan's last shift as a rookie he is partnered with Quigley Smitty (Brent Huff) where he tries to get a gangster to turn on La Fiera (Camille Guaty) but inadvertently gets the gangster killed by a sniper working for La Fiera. During this, Nolan meets firefighter Bailey Nune (Jenna Dewan) who he takes as a date to the wedding of Angela Lopez and Wesley Evers. When nobody can find West and Lopez, Nolan goes into the bridal room and discovers them both missing.

=== Season Four ===
In the aftermath of La Fiera kidnapping Lopez, Nolan alongside Bradford, Chen, Harper and Grey watched security footage of Jackson being shot in the back by Armando De Leon (Jose Velasquez) which visibly upsets each of them. Nolan volunteers to assist Bradford and Harper in going to Guatemala to rescue Lopez. Nolan's role in the rescue is going undercover as a builder to locate blueprints from the firm that built La Fiera's compound. When Wesley gets separated from Lopez in his independent role of the rescue Nolan elects to go and rescue Wesley from La Fiera's henchwoman Abril (Gigi Zumbado) which he successfully does. Three months later, Nolan is present when Lopez brings home her newborn baby named in Jackson's honour.

Chen has Nolan come over to help paint West's old room as her ward, Tamara Collins (Dylan Conrique) is moving in the room. Nolan and Chen then meet new rookie Aaron Thorsen (Tru Valentino), who was wrongfully convicted of murdering his friend and roommate in Paris. Nolan and Chen are partnered together to go on patrol where he tries testing his training officer ideas on her when they stop Claire Ivey (Tricia Helfer) who was speeding in her Chevrolet Corvette, he is shocked when he runs her name in the system to learn that she was the main suspect in multiple heists but never caught or convicted, getting advice from Grey he impresses on her to leave Los Angeles which she doesn’t. At the scene of a gas leak Nolan sees Bailey again and asks her to be able to redo their date which she agrees and they go on a stakeout of Claire. Bailey the next day dumps him by text and he is disheartened but focuses on apprehending Claire. Later that night he goes to Bailey looking for an explanation where she admits to not always being all-in on relationships but they agree to give it a go.

Nolan and Chen respond to a house fire where they hear screams inside and go to rescue the victim. As they come out of the fire, Bailey reprimands them for going into a fire without protection. The next morning Nolan learns that the fire was arson and there was another person inside who they believe was the arsonist. After an interview with the victim they rescued they learn that the other person wasn’t the arsonist but another victim of the fire. When getting lunch, Nolan teases Harper and Thorsen over an earlier mishap of them briefly being declared missing due to Thorsen not answering their radio when a sniper kills a man in a moving car. Bradford arriving with Officer Webb (Jay Hunter), commanded that Harper and Thorsen to secure the scene while he, Webb, Nolan and Chen go after the sniper. The sniper leads them into a chase at a car park and then zip lines away. The next day Nolan and Chen end up going to the sniper suspect's house, the suspect Aiden Merritt (Jonah Wharton) acts like he is going to assist them but instead threatens them with a live grenade. Nolan charges at Merritt and get the grenade off him and calls the bomb squad. That night, Lopez reveals to him and Bailey that there is two other murders in Nevada that match the Modus operandi of the arsonist.

While riding solo, Nolan is called to a potential domestic violence case where two men are searching for a woman (Kathryn Prescott) when Nolan finally catches up to the woman, the men instigate a shootout. Bradford and Chen arrive after the shoutout and go with Nolan to investigate the house which is smaller on the inside. Nolan and Chen are surprised when Bradford likens the house to a "reverse TARDIS". With there being stock photos in frames and Cyrillic writing on control panels they deduce it is a Russian safe house. The trio are approached by Central Intelligence Agency officer Mike Weston (Reggie Lee) who takes the case off their hands. Weston asks for the evidence they collected but Chen lies and says they didn’t collect any. They lift prints from the woman off Nolan’s vehicle and get her real name Katerina Antonov. They find out she has a relationship with an Air Force Major who they then find dead. Weston arrives and Bradford demands answers from Weston who takes them into a SCIFF and gives them a briefing. Later that night, Nolan and Bailey return to the police parking lot where his shot up car is to locate evidence where Antonov attacks them but Bailey defends them in hand-to-hand combat. Weston arrives and arrests Antonov and addresses Bailey as "lieutenant". Meanwhile Nolan considers running to be the union representative for the police.

On Halloween, Pete returns to Los Angeles and pranks Nolan by pretending his intestines are coming out but it is jerky. Partnered with Harper, they go on patrol when a woman heavily drugged up on a new drug called "Bomb-X" has her zombified. Nolan gets a call from Pete’s girlfriend Chasity informing him that he’s missing but Nolan informs her where Pete is. Nolan learns from Pete that Chasity is pregnant and he ran away due to not being a responsible person. That night Nolan has Pete help them buy Bomb-X undercover. The next day, Chasity comes to LA and informs Pete that the pregnancy was a false alarm and Pete goes back to his joking ways.

Weeks later, when investigating the arsonist serial killer, Nolan suspects Bailey’s fire chief, Fred Mitchell (Michael Reilly Burke) of being the killer due to him having the accelerant in his basement and being in Nevada at the time of those deaths. Bailey is annoyed at Nolan for thinking it but investigates and finds trophies in his home office. When Lopez comes with a warrant to arrest him the house blows up and Bailey is impaired in the leg. When giving death notifications, Bailey learns from a contact that Fred was in hospital at the time of the Nevada deaths. When looking around Fred’s house, Nolan is kidnapped by Fred’s neighbour Marcus Lindsey (Maury Sterling) and has to fight him to escape despite being pepper-sprayed by Lindsey. Nolan manages to subdue him and get back up.

Lopez and Nolan partner up to go and arrest a man Marvin Reynolds (Dave Davis) who is a member of the Sovereign citizen movement who assaulted an IRS Agent, Reynolds then shoots at them and escapes. During their day Nolan learns that Wesley has been manipulated by criminal Elijah Stone (Brandon Jay McLaren). Nolan immediately offers to help but Lopez doesn’t know how he can help. Lopez and Nolan interview Reynolds’s ex girlfriend Erica (Veronica Diaz Carranza) who said she hasn’t seen him in a month and she tells them that a man called Cooper radicalised him. Lopez and Nolan then go and interrogate Cooper Sanford (Matt Letscher) who denies any knowledge of Reynolds. Sanford aggressively refuses to comply and is arrested, Lopez gets physical where Nolan stops her. Nolan gets through to Sanford who admits he personally is all talk. Bradford asks Nolan to give his sister Gennifer Bradford (Peyton List) advice on what an old house would be worth. They locate Sanford to a boat, the USS Iowa Museum where he is shot by Lopez and falls to his death immediately after. Nolan also receives an endorsement for union rep from Bradford.

At Christmas time, Nolan makes plans to propose to Bailey and tries getting Henry and Bailey to meet over FaceTime. Nolan assists on the sting operation to take down Elijah. That night Tamara confronts him about Smitty’s campaign against him in the union representative election where he refuses to play dirty or stoop to Smitty’s level. At the dinner where Nolan is intending to propose, her ex-husband Jason Wyler (Steve Kazee) arrives announcing he’s got parole. Jason declares that he and Bailey never got divorced. Nolan is disheartened as Bailey leaves the table. When discussing the revelations with Harper, she advises him to contact her skip tracer Randy Spitz (Flula Borg) to do a background check on Jason. Nolan and Harper respond to a plane crash where they find gold bricks in the plane. Harper runs the prints from the missing pilot and informs Nolan, Chen and Bradford that the pilot was Levi Lincoln (Ross Partridge). During the incident, Bailey tries to speak to Nolan about the dinner, she apologises and tries to explain herself, Nolan informs her that he is more angry that she didn’t trust him with that information. Nolan and Harper go to the prison where Lincoln is meant to be imprisoned but learn that Lincoln paid a man Lamar Sheff to do his time by having Sheff undergo plastic surgery to look like him. Harper and Nolan reluctantly approach Oscar for information on who all in the prison is involved in the Lincoln fake-out. Oscar overhears Nolan’s phone call with Randy. Oscar offers to get Nolan more information on Jason than what Randy can get. That night, Nolan receives a phone call from Bailey, he can tell something is wrong but she denies it to him. Bailey tells him that she wants to sit down to explain things but he tells her that he needs time to process things. Later that night, Oscar calls Nolan on a contraband phone and informs him about Jason being a "stone cold manipulator" and how he whispers in the right ears. The next day, Harper and Nolan pursue Lincoln to a hanger at an airstrip where they engage in a shoot out with Lincoln. Bradford and Chen arrive and help them arrest Lincoln. That night Nolan gets a call that Bailey has been arrested after Jason has planted drugs in her car. Wesley briefs Bailey and Nolan on what the charges can lead to, he can’t represent her due to being suspended from practicing law. After being given time off, Nolan and Bailey visit Oscar in prison to get more information on him where Oscar suggests that Jason has someone helping him who might’ve found him through a prison letter writing scheme. They find Evelyn Reed (Ever Carradine) who initially believes Jason’s lies but when Bailey tells her story, Evelyn believes her and kicks Jason out. Nolan then sees Jason coming into the station after surrendering to the police where Grey and Chris Sanford (Kanoa Goo) from D.A.’s office make a deal for him to turn on the Southern Front. At the sting, Oscar rings Nolan to inform him that he informed the gang that Jason was turning on them. Jason fights Nolan who apprehends him.

Nolan is elected as union rep and immediately clashes with the union president, Lieutenant Landon Briggs (James Eckhouse) who promises to retaliate on Nolan after Nolan spoke to a councilwoman, Elena Gutierrez (Sara Amini) about having more help when going out on mental health calls.

Nolan accidentally lets Leo Thomas (McCarrie McCausland) on to the station’s helipad and Leo steals a police helicopter. Nolan requests to take Chen with him due to her history of learning about psychology in university. Leo sends them on "three quests" the first of which is to go and investigate a drug den where they find a dealer who runs away who Chen manages to apprehend while Nolan finds a teenager unconscious on drugs. Leo then sends them after another drug dealer who has an alligator called Cupcake. Nolan and Chen soon work out the quests are connected to people who work for his step-father, Brian Jost (Brad Hunt). Leo explains that Jost got his mother (Toni Ann DeNoble) hooked on drugs. Nolan and Chen arrest Jost and convince Leo to land the helicopter. Nolan cites Leo out on bail.

Randy comes to Los Angeles looking for help in locating a madame who has skipped bail, Ivy Flynn (Erin Cummings). Nolan and Harper help him locate her and have to protect him when a motorcycle gang called the "Dead Bastards" come looking to get Ivy.

While working the front desk, a man comes in desperate for help but Nolan tells him to wait in line but by the time Nolan and Smitty get to him he has been murdered under their noses. It’s learned that a drive by murder that Bradford and Chen are working on is linked to the murder at the front desk they learn that both deaths were ordered by Matteo Rubio, a crime lord. After Grey is forced to kill a hit-woman, Jane Becker (Michelle Lee), Nolan remains at the hospital to represent Grey as his union representative. Bailey overhears Bradford telling Nolan to do for Grey what he did for Nolan earlier when Nolan killed Alex Montgomery where she revealed that during a tour with the army she had a fatal shooting also. While recovering in his hospital room Grey enquires about Nolan’s plans to be a training officer where Nolan admits he’s still working on it with help from Bradford where Grey advises Nolan to specialise on one topic of policing.

Nolan responds to a car crash where the driver, Riley Templeton (Siena Goines) had a catastrophic injury, Bailey arrives on scene with the fire department where she tells Nolan to sit with Riley and talk to her in her final moments. Nolan goes with Riley’s body to the hospital as she is an organ donor where he witnesses the honour walk as she’s taken to the operating room. Doctor Spader (Deidrie Henry) takes preliminary details from him before going into the operating room also. Later at the hospital, Bradford brings in a patient, Piper Scott (Honey Robinson) who’s set to receive Riley’s heart along with her father Graham (Geoffrey Owens). Bradford checks in with Nolan over the accident and informs him that there is counselling services available to him. While at the hospital a man Jonah Russell (Raphael Sbarge) arrives announces that he has hacked the hospital systems. Jonah demands that Riley’s heart is to go to his wife Meredith (Amanda Wyss). Lopez arrives to get a briefing about the situation from Nolan, Bradford and Linda Brooks (Judith Moreland) who runs the hospital. Nolan tries to get through to Meredith. Meredith while remorseful doesn’t wish to stop her husband as she doesn’t want to die. Brooke and Spader inform Nolan and Lopez that somebody will get the heart no matter who it is. Wesley arrives and threatens to sue the hospital if they give the heart to Meredith. Nolan finds a patient flatlining in the ICU and tries to administer CPR but the patient dies. Nolan and Brooks inform Jonah that they’ll give in to his demands because of the patient dying. Nolan has to stop Graham’s attempt to attack Meredith so Piper would get the heart. Nolan tries to plead with Jonah to put the full hospital back online but he refuses and then asks about what will happen to Graham and when Nolan is honest with him Jonah admits he doesn’t care about anybody but his wife. Piper FaceTime’s Nolan who wants to speak to Meredith who agrees to speak to her despite Jonah’s protests. Meredith decides to back out of the surgery and Piper gets the heart. Jonah is forced to turn off the ransomware but the people who helped him make it took over the systems and demanded money. Nolan and Bradford trace the hackers, Chloe Speeker and Spencer Murkle (Elizabeth Haley and Alexis Bloom) to a house but cables lead them to a container where they work out of and are arrested.

Nolan and Chen partner up while Bradford trains Thorsen, Chen vents issues about not getting enough credit while being Bradford's gofer. Nolan advises her to ask to be reassigned but instead she wants him to vent with her. When attending a mutual aid call they encounter washed out rookie Larry Macer (Greg Grunberg) who is a sergeant with the railroad police. Larry mentions that he no longer needs the aid as he believes he’s scared off the intruders. Larry, Nolan and Chen then find Larry's partner Kevin shot and radio for medical aid to come. They learn that a train was ransacked and a vase was stole which belonged to a criminal, William Bloomfield (Mark Harelik) convicted of fraud. Larry and Nolan learn that the vase contained numbers for offshore bank accounts. They discover Bloomfield's children Francis, Thackeray and Danielle (Drew Seeley, Brandon Larracuente and Olesya Rulin) and Bloomfield's former cell mate whom Francis killed. After solving the case, Nolan attends Harper's wedding to James alongside everyone.

After nearly being killed in an explosion caused by Ilya Sokurov (Yuri Sardarov), Nolan meets FBI agents Matthew Garza and Casey Fox (Felix Solis and Kat Foster) alongside FBI trainee and former guidance counsellor Simone Clark (Niecy Nash). Nolan and Clark work together to get to the bottom of what Sokurov is doing. When Sokurov has sent a bomb in a truck, Nolan drives into the truck to stop it. Simone's father Christopher "Cutty" Clark (Frankie Faison) arrives at hospital berating Simone for being in danger and refuses to shake Nolan's hand due to his dislike of law enforcement. Following Sokurov to an aquarium and hearing his story about being let down by Bill August (Adrian Pasdar) of the CIA they end up getting into a shootout with operatives of August's. When Clark returns to the FBI Academy, Nolan goes to say his goodbyes where Cutty shakes his hand and thanks him for protecting Simone.

On Mother's Day, Nolan is partnered with Grey where they prepare a house for a criminal, Daniel Tran (Paul Yen) who is testifying against the gang he’s part of in exchange for witness protection. When Tran escapes the house to go see his mother (Page Leong), Grey and Nolan track him to the stables that she runs. After protecting them against the gang both mother and son go into witness protection together. That night Grey and Luna go to see Nolan to inform him that he has been seconded to Frontera to fill in as punishment for going against the Union president.

At Frontera, Nolan and Bailey are joined by friends Nell Forester (Sara Rue) and Elroy Basso (Alan Tudyk) meet officer Gabrielle Navar (Stephanie Arcila). Gabrielle takes Nolan to the police station which is in the back of a diner. When out on patrol they are called to a bar fight between two brothers, Doug and Will (Tommy Kijas and Alex Barone). Will has accidentally stabbed his brother with a broken bottle in the neck, Bailey comes to help treat him and take him to hospital. Back on patrol, Nolan and Gabrielle encounter Pete and Chasity, the former of whom was of the belief that Nolan had invited him to join on the excursion. They then pull over Blair Darvill (Greg Ellis) for dangerous driving and take him in because he has no identification. The next morning criminals associated to Darvill try to bail him out and shook up the diner when that isn’t possible. Nolan, Gabrielle and Elroy stand their ground and arrest the criminals.

=== Season Five ===
After the events in Frontera, Chief Coleman (Susan Chuang) arrives to give Nolan a golden ticket where he can have any position in the department that he wants. Everybody tries to tell Nolan what to pick but he takes time to think about it. Nolan is also assigned to be part of the detail at the courthouse for the trial of Rosalind Dyer for the crimes of her acolyte Caleb. Dyer makes comments to Nolan about Wesley, Tamara, Luna and Bailey. Using her lawyer Beth Veston (Lucy Walters) as a new acolyte to kill the deputy (Chastity Dotson) guarding her, Dyer escapes. Wesley, Tamara, Luna and Bailey are taken to the station to be protected while a heavily pregnant Harper arrives to interrogate Veston who is carving Rosalind's name in her arm. When Wesley informs them about Veston's issues with her parents, Nolan and Grey go to their house and find them dead alongside a video of her killing them. The next morning, James arrives to take Harper home while Grey mentions that Garza rang to inform them there’s a sighting of Dyer out of state. Luna asks Nolan if he knows what he’ll do with his golden ticket to which he replies training officer. At home, Nolan gets a phone call from Dyer telling him to look out for Lucy, it’s then revealed that she has sliced Lucy's boyfriend, Chris’s wrists.

Grey asks Nolan to complete the training of Thorsen, in which they assist Lopez and Bradford in investigating the "suicide" of a deputy sheriff. They learn that he was wearing a wire as to bring a case against his dirty colleagues. During the investigation, Nolan worries that he isn’t teaching Thorsen much but is reassured that he has taught him well.

Nolan gets assigned Celina Juarez (Lisseth Chavez) as his new rookie, they get off to a bumpy start when she pulls over a car for "having a bad aura" the car has blood in it linked to a missing person but due to the bad stop it is inadmissible. Nolan learns that Celina's sister Blanca was kidnapped and murdered when she was a child and that is how Celina began to believe in astrology. When they rescue the missing person, Celina runs off on her own without back-up after the kidnapper where he attacks her but she defends herself and arrests him.

The following week, Nolan learns that Bailey has been caught in a trap by Rosalind Dyer. Rosalind rings Nolan and he leaves Bailey to go meet her. When he meets Rosalind she reveals that he must kill her if he wants to save Bailey. Throughout the ordeal he refuses to kill her even when he thinks Bailey could be dead, instead he arrests her and as he walks out of the house with her she is killed by her acolyte Eli Reynolds who uses the name Jeffrey Boyle (Thomas Dekker). Bailey is brought to the scene where Nolan embraces her with relief.

Nolan expresses worry about Bailey returning to work a week after being nearly killed by Eli but she dismisses his worry. Nolan and Celina arrive at a car crash scene where Bailey is stabilising a patient, Rob Lukasey (Cody John) to take to the hospital while they secure the scene. Afterwards they follow the ambulance to the hospital where they find the Lukasey has escaped after assaulting Bailey’s partner Greg Hanson (Roy Williams Jr.). Nolan speaks to Jasper Lee (Maurice Hall) a security guard at the hospital who receives a photo of Lukasey to distribute around. Nolan learns that Lukasey killed a woman that morning. Bailey informs Nolan that Greg has a broken collarbone. They find the discarded bloody clothing that Lukasey has discarded and stolen scrubs. Nolan learns that Celina has a dislike for hospitals due to memories of her sister who held out for two weeks before dying. Nolan and Celina go to the hospital basement and split up, and discover Jasper dead. Lukasey takes Celina hostage and Nolan raises the alarm but Celina switches her radio so Nolan can hear everything as she’s forced into an ambulance. Nolan gets to the ambulance where he is shot at but Celina reveals that she has injected him with morphine which knocks him out. Nolan praises Celina for the morphine move. That night, Bailey proposes to Nolan which he accepts.

Nolan and Celina pull over a driver (Deyo Forteza) who has an abundance of knives and then they hear a wild animal growling from the trunk of his car. Later Bailey and Nolan are having competitions to work out where they’ll hold their wedding. Back at work, Nolan discusses idea to help Celina sleep due to seeing her yawning at the start of shift. Celina while tired nearly drove through a red traffic light. They get called to an issue at a bank where a customer, Macy Tomkins (Luciana Faulhaber) has tried to deposit money that’s linked to an investigation. On another call, Nolan responds to an arson where Bailey is also a responder where they find more money this time burnt. Nolan finds a tracking device in embedded in the money. Nolan, Celina, Harper and Lopez meet with Xavier Lind (J. August Richards) from the DEA who briefs them about an operation from ten years prior into a criminal called Winslow Harris (Walter Perez) where Lind’s partner was murdered. Lind travels with Nolan and Celina to go to speak to Macy where Lind reveals that his partner was also his boyfriend. At Macy’s residence they discover her murdered. They find a Saint Brendan medal which Lind mentions is a thing Harris wore ten years ago. Lopez mentions to them that Macy had some sugar daddies. That night Celina arrives at Nolan’s house having issues with sleeping. Bailey and Nolan argue on ways to help her sleep where their arguing put her to sleep. The next day, Celina thanks them for letting her stay and tells them about a dream she had. Nolan and Celina inform Lind and Harper that they have liked Harris to a marina and theorise that she and Harris could’ve been in love. They except for Harper leave to investigate, at the marina, they pursue Harris who admits that Macy was not meant find out about his past. Lind arrests him and later reveals that Harris received multiple life sentences. That night Celina comes to stay over again while Jake Tapper and his son knock on their door while trick-or-treating.

Nolan and Celina stop a man (Brandon McShane) walking a coffin up the road who says he’s taking his brother Kenny (Lewie Bartone) for a drink in case he never sees him again. Kenny is shown to be alive and only moving away from the area. Nolan advises Lopez and Grey that he will try and stop Elijah Stone from viewing their complaint records after he begins to sue them for false arrest, after he was released. After a routine stop, Nolan and Celina witness a woman, Abby (Brianna Brown) shooting a man, Dr. Alvin Mitchelssen, Nolan briefly chases her and she surrenders when taking her to the police car, Celina reveals that the victim was already dead due to stabbing. Nolan and Grey discuss what exactly they can charge Abby with due to the fact the victim is already dead. Abby reveals to Nolan and Celina that Alvin prescribed her father opioids who got addicted and Alvin kept prescribing them. Nolan informs her that Alvin was already dead and that they would not be charging her with murder. Nolan and Celina bring in Alvin’s wife (Jacqueline Obradors) who can’t give information as to who wanted him dead. Bailey visits Nolan at work with a lot of redecoration materials where he worries that she feels uncomfortable at home so he decides to go to her old house and get stuff of hers to bring to his house. Celina comes to inform them that Alvin was being investigated by the medical board for over prescribing. They soon learn that Alvin was killed by his wife and they arrest her.

After Celina stays over for another night, Nolan informs her that it has to stop while Bailey mentions hearing noises coming from under the house. At work Nolan and Celina stop a woman, Pam Winfield (Leonora Pitts) and asks her to turn her car off but she refuses due to having a bomb placed around her neck, Nolan lets her go assuming it’s the real deal. They follow Pam but keep their radios out of range so not to detonate the device. Nolan has Celina drive parallel to the car so he can try and get a better look at the device as to advise the bomb squad when they get on scene. Nolan rings Pam's phone to tell her to drive into an empty lot that Bradford and Chen have secured. As Mike (Anthony Molinari) the bomb squad technician arrives and tries to get close it explodes killing Pam instantly in front of the police and some skateboarders who were onlookers. Nolan and Celina then go and inform Pam's mother, Marianne (Judith Foster Thompson) of her death. After delivering the news, they’re back on patrol when Bailey rings Nolan as she is investigating the noise under the house and finds a creepy doll. Nolan and Celina go with Lopez, Harper and Thorsen to arrest the bomb maker Richard Dormer (Jed Rees) who surrendered without a fight but revealed that there is another bomb attached to a person's neck. It is learned that Dormer's sister was killed in a botched hostage negotiation and she was driven for 43 minutes into a desert where she was executed. They learn that the bomb is around the neck of Dormer's sister's boss Henri Parsons (Mark Famiglietti). Parsons was directed to go to his company offices and Nolan and Harper go to help him. Nolan sends Harper away as he'll try to diffuse the bomb himself. Celina rings where Dormer claims that cutting the green wire will deactivate the bomb but a facial expression makes Celina inform Nolan to cut the red one instead which did deactivate the bomb. Nolan was thankful to Celina's gut instinct. Later at home, Bailey informs Nolan she found what was making the noise and shows him a coyote in a crate as she believed it was a puppy.

Nolan helps Gennifer with moving in to her new house and repairs around the house when she reveals that her charm bracelet is missing and he offers to ring the moving company to see if they know where it is. While out on patrol he and Celina stop a man, Ryan Davis (Matthew Alan) who is coming out of a jewellery store after robbing it. He gets hurt in the process so they take him to hospital to be assessed. When Davis is cleared by the hospital they take him into custody. Gennifer comes to the station where Nolan reveals that her son, Tyler (Jason David) threw the bracelet into a bin where she leaves to speak to him. After putting Davis into a cell he is attacked by another prisoner in holding. Nolan gets elbowed in the face by the prisoner and then attacked by other prisoners. Bradford and other officers rush to assist them. Bradford orders Nolan and Celina to go to hospital to get their injuries checked out. While at hospital, they see Davis being rushed in unresponsive by Bradford and he dies in hospital. Bradford places Celina on admin leave until she is cleared in case of her take down caused the death. Nolan represents Celina as her union rep while she is interrogated by Wesley and Sanford. Trying to help her Nolan tells Celina he knew how she feels but with him he directly killed a suspect. He admits it took him a long time to come to terms with it. Harper and Lopez inform Nolan and the patrol officers that Davis’s girlfriend (Jennifer C. Holmes) that he had a baby that he keeps in a soundproofed cooler. Nolan delivers the news that Celina has been cleared in the death as it was caused during the brawl in the holding cells.

While on patrol, Nolan has been tasked with finding out if Celina and Thorsen are in a relationship. Nolan and Celina then respond to a bank robbery where they are attacked in the pursuit of Todd Shelf (Vincent Ventresca) who shoots the police car’s engine. Nolan and Celina meet Simone and her training agent Carter Hope (James Lesure) who are brought in to assist in the investigation. Simone and Hope informs them that Shelf got paid half a million dollars to do the job. Nolan, Celina, Simone and Hope all go to the address of the owner of a safety deposit box that was opened, Taylor Barnes (Jojo Nwoko) whom is a hacker on a watchlist. They interview him where he reveals he hacked a list of undercover federal agents and he is shot dead by a sniper before he can name the buyer of the list. When it’s learned there is an accomplice at the hospital, Nolan and Celina go to apprehend them but they escape before they can. Nolan and Celina later find a getaway truck with Shelf shot dead inside. Later Celina confronts Nolan about his queries about a relationship with Thorsen and reveals that they’ve been playing Dungeons & Dragons together.

Bailey reveals to Nolan that the elderly couple renting her house hasn’t paid rent in six months and he mentions about handling it. Nolan and Celina go to the house where Celina highlighted that she feels that Nolan and Bailey are too nice to be landlords. When speaking to the couple, Malcolm and Maeve Walker (Harvey J. Alperin and Tacey Adams) they claim to be finically struggling and will have the money on the following Wednesday but Celina tells Nolan that she doesn’t believe them. Lopez radios them to assist her and Harper in looking for a missing person, Mateo Ramirez who they find dead with other bodies cocooned inside a wall. Nolan and Celina are shocked and disgusted by what they found. Harper expresses worry that the scene could start a gang war. When Bailey’s tenants send over a list of things that need repaired he is in disbelief but notices Celina is still disturbed by the scene. They then go and speak to gang leader Quinlan Wright (Al-Teron) where they can deduce that he has arranged retaliation against rival gang leader Moses Warden (Aaron Behr). That night Bailey and Nolan visit her property where it is revealed that Maeve and Malcom have sub-letted the property to a pornographic film producer. Nolan sent details of it to Wesley, he advises them to start the eviction process where the fact it’s a porn set makes the eviction easier. When Nolan and Bailey deliver the eviction notice they find the house completely cleared out.

When entering a lift at the hospital with other officers, Nolan and Celina meet Kelly Clarkson. Nolan and Celina are tasked with protecting Oscar while he is in hospital donating a kidney to his daughter Ashley (Molly C. Quinn). Celina freaks Oscar out by telling him he is going to die which Nolan responds about trusting her instincts. Multiple criminals come to try and kill Oscar including Rod Carmichael (Marvin Telp) a reformed criminal who become a orderly at the hospital after leaving prison and Troy Hoffman (Todd Eric Andrews) posing as another doctor who kidnaps the surgeon, Charlene Bernard’s (Audrey Marie Anderson) family. Once Bernard’s family are rescued she takes Oscar and operates on him wanting him out of her hospital as soon as possible.

Weeks later, Nolan learns that his mother has died and returns to Foxburg to clean out her house with Bailey. They meet Josh Cherry (Mike Capozzi) who has been impersonating him. Stacy comes and meets Nolan and Bailey in the town and expresses condolences. When back at the house two men Decker and Perry Conroy (Daeg Faerch and Daivd St. Pierre) who were dealing with Evelyn where she had heroin that belonged to them. Nolan called local sheriff Steve McNeese (Drew Rausch) to come and arrest the men. That night, Stacy brings them food when a local militia starts shootings at the house, Nolan and Bailey defend the house until McNeese arrives to arrest them and tells Nolan that he can’t wait for him to return to LA. The next morning Stacy returns and informs them that the bank has foreclosed on the house and Bailey and Nolan depart laughing.

After returning to work, Nolan and Celina join the other officers in searching for a biological weapon when they alongside Harper and Thorsen are redirected to find three people who have been in contact with a person who has ebola. Nolan and Celina track one of the people, Matthew Northrop (Lee Simpson) to his house where they inform him that he has to quarantine and they learn his “girlfriend” (Dani Bryan) in the house so they take her in as well. After learning that the second person, Kip Sherborn (Tom Plumley) has been quarantined by Harper and Thorsen, Nolan focuses on finding the third person, Robert Betts (Kondwani Phiri). They track Robert to a bus stop but fail to stop him getting on the bus and because he is already exhibiting symptoms they have to quarantine the whole bus. During this, Celina asks Nolan to get her the case files on her sister’s disappearance which he reluctantly agrees to view them before giving her them. After quarantining everyone they go and assist in stopping the driver with the bioweapon which after a brief stand off they successfully do. After getting the file, Celina comes to Nolan’s house distraught because she has found out her mother, Karla (Marlene Forte) had lied to her due to having a different story in the files at the time of Blanca’s disappearance. Nolan tries to calm Celina but agrees to speak to the person who verified her mother’s alibi. They meet with Edwin Guzman (Jaime Paul Gomez) who declares that Karla and he were both addicts to opioids. He explains that after Blanca’s disappearance Karla went cold turkey as she blamed herself. Later on, Nolan has Karla brought in so the detectives can question her. Sometime later on the anniversary of Blanca’s disappearance they are alerted to another girl disappearing, Olivia Vargas (Vivian Stein) and her mother (Colleen Foy) is also an addict. During the search, Nolan meets Officer Joel Chambers (Don McManus) who he becomes immediately suspicious of and alerts Harper to those suspicions. It is revealed that Chambers did kill Blanca and two other girls alongside kidnapping Olivia. During a stand off with Metro after releasing Olivia he is shot and killed by Bradford.

While Celina is off, Nolan partners with Harper when she gets a call from Randy asking hypothetical legal questions and a second call from him when he finds a dead body. Harper and Nolan have to take a case (“NoHo Doe”) from Detective Scanlon (Sean Anthony Baker) so they can speak to Randy who happens to be represented by Monica Stevens (Bridget Regan). They then have to help Randy again when he’s caught trespassing again trying to find who’s set him up. Randy calls for a third time where he’s got himself stuck in the boot of Brian Cole’s (Brandon Keener) car. Harper and Nolan pull Cole over and she performs a fake field sobriety test while Nolan gets Randy out of the boot. They finally learn he’s being set up by a Cooper Logue who they arrest.

Nolan and Celina listen in on a task force tasked with apprehending Frank Teska (Michael Rooker). Harper then tasks them with finding evidence to solve the NoHo Doe case. Days later they find a leg that is linked to the case where Celina and Nolan have to get a dog away from the leg. Nolan notices the dog’s owner Scott Wickham (Ben Levin) is at the police station and asks her on a date. They watch in on Harper interviewing two men Hank and Mark (Andrew Tippie and Nick Alvarez) whom are friends of NoHo Doe who’s been identified as Trip Linden. They find a video of Hank and Mark killing Trip with a RPG and go to arrest them, one blows his fingers off with a grenade launcher and when he’s took to hospital the other comes tries threatening them with a gun but is subdued by Lopez who’s there for an obstetrician appointment. After discovering a link to a murder in Arizona, Simone comes to the station to inform Nolan that one of the limbs discovered is connected to an FBI investigation.

Bailey calls Nolan while he’s working on the garage conversion for Cutty and Simone and informs him that Thorsen and Celina have been attacked by a gang. Nolan rushes to the hospital where Celina recites a poem the leader told her. Nolan and Bailey get attacked the next night by a hitman, Hamza Young (Hans Obma) who was tasked with attacking them. Nolan and Harper then have to back Bradford and Chen up when they locate the attacker and his gang. When Nolan, Grey, Chen and Bradford corner the leader, Luke Moran (Chet Grissom) refuses to surrender and commits suicide by cop.

=== Season Six ===
In the immediate aftermath of Luke Moran's suicide by cop, Nolan travels to the Los Angeles Federal Reserve where he learns that all of the previous incidents was just a distraction for the heist. Nolan is shot at by one of the crew (Guy Fernandez) with a machine gun after seeing bloodstains on the floor of the building. Grey, Bradford, Chen and Harper come to back him up. The crew kill their outside shooter and two other associates driving an armoured van and escape through the tunnels while being chased by Nolan, Grey and Harper. Harper shoots one of them (Jean Elie) in the shoulder. Six weeks later, Nolan and Celina are on duty and she is trying to get information about Harper as a training officer as it’s the last shift before Nolan takes leave for his wedding. Harper jokes with him about the superstition of the "curse of the last shift". Bailey calls about issues over the air conditioning at their house. He goes over and fixes it when a new neighbour, Josh Randall (Marc Evan Jackson) informs them he will be doing demolition work on the same day as the wedding and refuses to change the date for the work. They are then called to a hostage situation at the hospital where the man Harper shot in the arm was brought into hospital after crashing his Lamborghini car into a tree. They try talking him into surrendering but he is about to kill nurse Lisa so Harper shoots him in the head. Nolan and Celina go to the man’s house and find a cellphone, gun and money in a drawer. While searching, Nolan has to reprimand Celina for constantly talking about the curse as it’s making her lose focus on the case. They see that the cellphone has a regular check in call everyday. At the call time Nolan takes the call in the Lamborghini revving the engine so the crew can’t tell it isn’t the Banks (the name the leader calls him). While Nolan is faking to be Banks, Celina, Lopez, Thorsen and the team get identifications on the members Boyd Taylor, Cyesha Witt and Kim Loncar (Kristian Bruun, Gissette Valentin and Constance Ejuma). They learn that the plane the three are on have changed their landing destination to an airfield in Whittier. Grey suggests that Nolan sits the take down out due to it being the last shift but Nolan insists on going where he is nearly killed twice first by an exploding gas cylinder and then by a luggage trolley. That night, Bailey comes to the station informing him that she can’t talk Randall out of the demolition works, Thorsen offers them his family’s spiritual oasis for their wedding which they accept.

When reviewing Celina’s bodycam footage, Grey witnesses Nolan walking off during a noise complaint call because a singer (later identified as Rodge Bronson) (Zander Hawley) sings “Daddy Cop” which visibly annoys Nolan. Meanwhile Nolan is finishing the wedding plans when Chasity comes to the house with Randy coming in place of Pete due to Randy apprehended Pete for unpaid fines. Wesley then phones him asking if he forgot that he has a deposition with him and Monica over being sued by Oscar. Nolan leaves Wesley his phone when he can’t stay due to needing to go further with completing his wedding plans. When he meets with Bailey she asks after his phone but lies and said he lost it. They meet with Be-Boo the person they’ve hired to be a DJ (Connor Price) who uses a switchblade in front of Nolan, admits to stealing and then offers them drugs, Nolan arrests him. Bailey then informs Nolan that their florist has sold the flowers for the wedding so he sorts the flowers out with Randy, Wesley and the male police officers as a bachelor party at Lopez and Wesley’s house. On the wedding day Nolan asks Bailey if she’s heard from Henry where she tells him that he missed his flight in Japan and she used military connections to get him a flight to Andrews Air Force Base and then she adds how she knows he’s being sued after learning it from Harper and Lopez at her hen party. When the priest is unable to arrive in time, Grey officiates the wedding. At the wedding party Randy acts as the DJ but James changes the track to "Bust a Move" and they dance to it. When it is noticed that Celina went off alone and has been kidnapped by a drug gang, Nolan, Grey, Chen, Lopez, Harper and Bradford go to rescue her which they do successfully.

Nolan and Bailey honeymoon on an island which was billed as a luxury villa but it isn’t as advertised. The owner Raphael and his daughter Elise (Michael Kostroff and Sarah Grace White) admit they used AI to generate images on how their “resort feels”. During the honeymoon they find a dead body in the water of the housekeeper, Martha Delgado (Nailah Johnson). When Nolan gets a little bit of signal on his phone he rings Harper and Lopez for back up. They discover the killer is Nicholas Colston (Chris Conner) who is using the alias Dean. Nicholas kidnaps Nolan and Bailey and they discover he has also killed Raphael and is holding Elise captive. Harper and Lopez come to the rescue and apprehend him where it is revealed he had murdered his girlfriend and had went on the run to the island. Nolan and Bailey decide to finish their honeymoon at home.

Back at work, Celina and Nolan respond to a dead body with the hallmarks of "The Pentagram Killer" and Celina declares that over an open radio channel which causes mass hysteria. They get a lead from Opal Jesper (Helen Eigenberg) that her long dead husband was the Pentagram Killer which makes their victim a copycat victim. Harper informs them that a fellow teacher who worked with the victim Conrad Bataglia (Joe Nieves) had spread hate about her on message boards. They go to Conrad’s house and find his wife murdered. They catch up to him and arrest him when Nolan gets called out to Opal’s house as she’s ran over a reporter who was harassing her.

While on a night shift, Nolan and Celina respond to a shots fired call and locate two people murdered, a woman near death and an unharmed toddler girl. At the hospital, Nolan opts to foster the baby girl until family can be found. Luna comes to the house and informs them that Anna the toddler, her mother died from her injuries. Wesley calls Nolan to go and give evidence again in the deposition against Oscar. Monica brings up texts that Nolan sent Bailey where Wesley tries defending the texts. Chen then meets with Nolan the next morning to look into what’s happening with Bradford but he offers to be there if she needs him but he goes with Harper and Lopez to interview the tenant (Malcolm David Kelley) the family had. He said that he only rented a room when he worked late in the area. He enquires after Anna. He then says about someone not being happy after the father won the lottery. They go out and search the registered address of Roderick Eaves but his mother Agatha (Drea Castro) lies and says he is not there but he starts shooting and they throw tear gas into him and shoot him in the leg. Wesley comes to the station to inform Nolan that the case against him by Oscar has been dismissed. Then Luna comes with a man Don Hughes (Joe Corzo) who is Anna’s uncle from Tampa who takes custody of Anna.

Celina asks Nolan for advice on roommates who are pushing her boundaries when they discover another police car speeding past him when they discover a civilian vaping and learn it is Smitty’s car. At home Bailey declares to Nolan that she wants to try for a child. Nolan tells Celina about Bailey’s wishes who’s excited. They’re then called to assist on a homeless encampment removal. Thorsen breaks a fight between a worker and a homeless man over a backpack that belonged to a missing woman while Celina finds the hi-vis of a prisoner who was doing community service there who’s escaped. They learn the missing prisoner is Theresa Vaughn (Sammi-Jack Martincak). They speak to Theresa’s mother Brenda (Brooke Lyons) who denies knowledge of the escape but suggests that she could be after the woman she previously assaulted, Doreen Davis (Sara Malal Rowe) believing she had an affair with Theresa’s boyfriend. Doreen tells them that Theresa did come to see her to apologise for the assault as she got it wrong. The next day they trace Theresa to her mother who it was revealed she was the one who slept with Theresa’s boyfriend. They arrest both. Back home Nolan and Bailey decide to try and make a baby.

Nolan and Bailey discuss their baby options while she drives him to work. Nolan and Celina get called to a missing babysitter, Emma Lautner (Ella Rodriguez). The baby’s mother Regina Olsen (Erica Piccinni) shows them a video from a nanny cam of Emma leaving. They soon learn that Emma’s friend Olivia Lane (Bella DeLong) is also missing. They visit Olivia’s mother (Tara Strong) who knows nothing about their whereabouts. While on the case Nolan is shocked to learn the prices of babysitters from Harper, Lopez and Chen. Bailey rings Nolan asking him if he wants to hook up in the back of the ambulance but he refuses due to the case. Dispatch puts a call over the radio from Emma. Nolan and Celina go to where the call was made to search and find Emma’s dead body. They call Harper and Lopez to the scene before going back out on patrol. They get a report of Olivia running frantic after claiming to have jumped out of a car. Thorsen and Bradford get there first and alert Nolan and other officers that they have her. Nolan and Celina go to look for the kidnapper and find a silver SUV, they approach the car and find Mr Olsen murdered in the front seat. Nolan alerts Bailey to the information as Olivia is the main suspect. Nolan and Celina find her hiding behind a blue Honda but pursue her to a dead end where she threatens them with a knife. She explains that she found out she was pregnant, she hit Mr Olsen and she killed Emma because she was going to report her to the police. Nolan and Celina discuss the case where she feels sorry for Olivia but Nolan feels sorry for Mrs Olsen.

The following week, Nolan and Bailey go and see a fertility doctor, Dr Bhatia (Monica Bhatnagar) at the hospital. Their appointment keeps being put back due to issues at the hospital including seeing Harper and Lopez accompanying Monica to the hospital after being attacked in her home by a masked man (Herve Ambwa), two rival gangs (Eastern Front and Russian Mob) getting into a shooting match and a full fight in hospital. Which includes a gunshot going off in Nolan’s ear by a woman. When they finally meet with Dr Bhatia she reveals that Bailey has issues with her fallopian tubes which is stopping her getting pregnant. It’s suggested they try IVF. After their appointment they notice the brother, Aram Azarian (Nicky Boulos) of the deceased Eastern Front leader is planning an attack, Nolan gets into a shootout which Chen and Celina assist in subduing the shooters. Later that night, Bailey tells Nolan she doesn’t want to go through the IVF process in case it doesn’t work.

In the aftermath of the suicide of Matt "Mad Dog" Dominques (Nick Gomez), Nolan gets a call from Bradford for help when he’s checking in on Celina moving in with Chen. Nolan represents Bradford as his union rep during questions from Detective Pearson (Daniel Bonjour). Bradford declares suspicions over police psychiatrist Blair London (Danielle Campbell). To work of the books, Grey gives Nolan and Celina a "professional development day" so they can get answers to Tim’s suspicions. Nolan and Celina request Smitty to sit in the waiting room outside Blair’s office and then visit Nell about discrepancies during calls which she admits she has seen. Nolan and Celina then visit Mad Dog’s apartment to look for evidence which ends up being a failure so Nolan goes to Blair’s office and interrupts her meeting with a Vice Officer, Don Cooper (Don Dowe) who leaves when Nolan enters. Nolan confronts Blair with his suspicions by faking a note book from Mad Dog’s apartment has details of Blair’s operation. Pearson then confronts Nolan for visiting the apartment. Nolan then warns three officers (Michael Clark, Aarin Cummings and Scott Benzing) about his suspicions. Blair uses Smitty’s phone to call Nolan looking to meet which they do at a park where he requests she hands herself in.

Nolan wakes Bailey up with his ideas of pursuing adoption as a work around for their dreams of having a child. Grey calls Nolan to a meet with himself, Harper and Garza who inform him that Pearson has disappeared. In a basement room at the LAPD, Nolan joins a group of trusted officers including Smitty, Lopez, Thorsen, Bradford and Celina. Celina works out that Blair and Monica are connected. Nolan and Harper accompany Garza, Laura Stensen (Britt Robertson) and Brendon Acres (Kevin Zegers) on a trip to Argentina where Monica has fled to with her associates Paige Baker and Pascal Moreau (Rayne Bidder and Andrew DiBartolomeo) and a kidnapped Blair. They watch Monica’s meeting with Swiss criminal Jakob Olmstead (Casper Andreas). Nolan makes an attempt to rescue Blair and gets shot in the buttock by Paige but is rescued by Harper. After returning to LA, Nolan is recuperating at home when he gets a call informing him that Oscar and Jason have escaped.

=== Season Seven ===
Nolan is part of a team trying to apprehend Jason doing a raid on a residence that a CI said he was staying at. Nolan mentions that Bailey has been on deployment overseas with the National Guard to stay safe from Jason. Grey checks in on Nolan due to it being his second day back after his injury. When a female criminal escapes at the raid, Celina pursues on foot while Nolan commandeers a electric scooter from a civilian. They apprehend her but learn that Jason was never at the residence. Sometime later, Nolan and Bradford meet new rookie officers Miles Penn and Seth Ridley (Deric Augustine and Patrick Keleher) where Penn gets partnered with Bradford and Ridley gets paired with a temporarily promoted Chen. Nolan congratulates Chen on her temporary promotion. Nolan asks Celina if she knows how Thorsen is doing after he transferred over to the North Hollywood Division after the Blair London scandal. They spot a pharmacy being robbed, when Nolan has a shot he briefly freezes and doesn’t take the shot and when the robber escapes they shoot a man to steal his car. Nolan renders aid to the man until the ambulance arrives. The man’s wife, Melody (Danny Brown) tells them that she needs to collect her daughter, Nikki (Dharma Brown) from school which Nolan tells her he can do. Nolan informs Grey about the freezing and admits he wasn’t confident if he had a clean shot but Grey reassures him they’ll review the bodycam footage later. Lopez and Harper inform them that the man died. After a car that Bradford and Penn impound sets off a radiation alarm, Nolan and Celina are asked by Grey and Garza to go to a house connected with the stolen battlefield bomb. Nolan has Celina set up a pole camera so they can watch the house. They see an issue where they try and get access by having Celina go plain clothes to distract two men, Brian and Crane (Jared Bankens and Jacob Figueroa) in the house who put the person of interest Paul Scoville in a bathtub. While watching Grey and Garza interview the men Nolan adds how Celina is doing to Chen and Bradfords note taking of their rookies. They learn from Crane that there are three people with the bomb; Marcus Leonard (Andrew Hawkes) the leader, LeShawn Wilkes (Malik Watson) and Evan Ardle (uncredited). Leonard and Ardle shoot at the police while Wilkes carries the bomb. Nolan arrives and takes the shot and non-fatally shoots Leonard and the others stop Wilkes. Nolan rings Bailey and leaves her a voicemail while going home to an empty house.

Nolan and Celina chase a criminal on a rooftop into a building to find him bound and gagged up by a masked vigilante who calls himself "The Watcher". The next day, Celina has her Plain Clothes Day and Nolan is getting advice from Bradford about how to handle the day as a training officer. Nolan briefs Celina about how the day will go. Their first call they go to is an 82 year old man, Walter Fields (William Sadler) who’s reported an intruder when they arrive they hear shots. They see a teenage girl, Chelsea shot in the chest and Nolan takes over and orders the man to surrender, he comes out and realises he shot his granddaughter. After she debriefs Detective Keith Graham (Ivan Hernandez) of the case she clashes with Nolan over the fact he stepped in when it is meant to be a day to see how she handles solo patrol and brings up that he might’ve stepped in because Walter is white and Nolan is white. Celina and Nolan then come to take a purse snatcher in to custody at the request of Harper and Lopez. Nolan discusses with them the Walter Fields call where he acknowledges his mistake of getting involved wheee they tell him he was wrong but he needs to control his impulses and instincts. Celina and Nolan then pull a car over because the registered owner, Arnold King (Tim Sitarz) has an open warrant against him. When she tries to talk to him he assaults her and she subdues him. At the end of shift, Grey goes over Nolan and Celina’s day on patrol who tells them that he’s impressed and passes her on her plain clothes day. That night Nolan visits Walter in the hospital who informs him that Chelsea has survived a 10-hour surgery but needs another one very soon. Walter tells Nolan that he’ll never forgive himself and that he doesn’t know when he became very afraid all the time. The next day Nolan and Celina back on patrol are sent to speak to Imelda Sanchez (Lourdes Benedicto) who has been copying "The Watcher" because a gang the "Sixth Street Devils" killed her daughter Sienna. During a gun fight where Imelda is about to kill a gangster, Celina talks Imelda down so they can arrest her.

Nolan has Bradford come and test his new home security system for two tickets to the Lakers before Bailey returns from Germany by trying to break in which Bradford successfully does and when Nolan asks how he says it’ll cost him two more tickets. At the station Scanlon comes to Nolan to inform him about Detective Graham having a member of Jason’s former gang in custody on a murder charge, Daniel Goodwin (Richard Ellis). Nolan asks Officer Kate Simmons (Tina WongLu) to open the cell Goodwin is in and she does but before he can get information Graham comes and chastises Nolan for putting his case at risk. Nolan then visits Goodwin’s mother (Bonnie Root) to see if she can get information which she agrees to try. Later she comes and tells Nolan that the gang has a hitman Malvado (Jimmy Gonzales) tasked with hunting Jason. That night, Nolan’s alarms go off, wakening him up and he calls for back up for an intruder but it is a woman (Katelyn Pippy) instead of Jason who says she has been drinking and got lost and Nolan cancels the back up. Due to not being able to go back asleep he decides to look into Malvado and sees that Smitty worked one of the cases of Malvado’s kills. Smitty gives him information and Nolan leaves Smitty’s RV. Nolan finds Malvado’s car a Cadillac and follows it to a building where Malvado is torturing a security guard, Trey Duncan (Eric Edelstein) for information relating to Jason’s whereabouts. Malvado reveals that he has done his homework on John Nolan. Malvado tries to reason with Nolan but he refuses to leave and then gets in a shootout with Malvado where Duncan is injured. Duncan reveals to Nolan that there’s no signal in the building and that he heard that Jason has shacked up with another woman. Nolan apprehends Malvado but can’t take him in due to Duncan losing too much blood. Malvado kicks Nolan in the face and escapes before the other officers arrive to rescue Nolan. At the hospital, Celina reveals that the police weren’t able to apprehend Malvado. That night Bailey returns home and Nolan has issues getting the front door open due to the alarm.

Nolan has Celina stay over in place of Bailey in case Jason attacks. Bailey requests Nolan to send some of her things to Chen’s apartment where she’s hiding out. Nolan and Celina are called to a mutual aid incident on the freeway by the California Highway Patrol. Nolan makes Celina lead so she can get the experience for future calls when she is a full officer. Nolan gets a video call from Bailey and realises he forgot to pack the stuff for Bailey to collect from Chen. Nolan and Celina find a woman, Savannah (Bella Ortiz) in the trunk of a car registered to a Harrison Novak (Noel Fisher). Nolan accompanies her to the hospital. Nolan briefs Lopez on the statement he received from Savannah. Harper reveals to him and Lopez that Wesley had got him off on criminal charges three years prior. Nolan then gets a phone call from Officer Lonergan (Jerry Ying) about Bailey leaving Chen’s apartment and when Nolan rings her she ignores his calls. Outside the firehouse, Nolan arrives and demands to know why Bailey left but she won’t give him answers. Nolan takes Bailey to the station where Grey asks him and Celina to go to a dump site where Novak buried his victims. When digging up his victims they find more victims that Novak denies are his. They call in FBI Agent Brendan Acres and his girlfriend FBI Lab tech Antoinette Benneteau (Devika Bhise) to assist in the investigation. Later, Grey informs Nolan that Jason’s fingerprints were discovered in Detroit, Michigan. Bailey comes back home and Celina returns to living with Chen and then Nolan and Bailey decide to spend some quality time together.

Nolan goes to work with the intention on speaking to the police in Detroit to learn more about Jason’s fingerprints being found at a liquor store robbery. While on patrol, Nolan and Celina visit Ryan Dearborne (Patrick Stafford) to get information on the other bodies discovered with Novak’s. They ring him to see if he is at his caravan but just hear screaming on the phone so they breach to try and locate him. They find him hiding under the floor of the caravan in mental distress while holding syringes. They bring him in to custody, they have Acres and Lopez interview him while Harper and Nolan watch in the viewing room. Nolan comes in to a interview room with Wesley, Grey, Acres and Lopez after Harper interviews vending machine stockist Liam Glasser (Seth Gabel) when Celina comes in looking for Nolan. Nolan learns that Jason paid a criminal to plant his fingerprints in Detroit. Celina and Nolan race to rescue Bailey after learning Jason has kidnapped her. They arrive at the scene of Jason’s crashed car where Nolan comforts Bailey in the wreckage. Nolan gives Acres Jason’s phone to track Jason’s girlfriend, Drew Davis who Nolan recognises as the woman who tried breaking in a while back, Bailey orders Nolan to go and catch Jason. When Nolan catches up to him he sees Drew dead from being shot by Malvado and when Nolan tries to get Jason to come out and surrender Malvado shoots Jason dead and escapes. At the hospital when Nolan is collecting Bailey he sees a burner phone with Malvado’s number and texts to him.

On Valentine’s Day, Nolan is still reeling from finding Bailey’s contact with Malvado leaves the house without saying anything. On patrol he and Celina are called to a fight in a hotel where a man, Sebastian Hernandez (Jonathan Nichols-Navarro) has attacked sex worker, Sally (Brenna Otts) while her bodyguard Gabe (Denzel Johnson) tries to protect her. Sebastian tells them that he booked Sally as she knew his missing daughter, Claudia (Jasmine Balais). Nolan brings Harper and Lopez into the case where they trace messages from her phone to an apartment in Century City. When they go to the apartment the manager, Brett (Jared Egusa) mentions he has a NDA and cannot say who is in the apartment when they notice two armed men entering the lift. One of the men Nikolai (Jonas Ball) mentions that they work for Russian gangster Anton Petrovich (Carlo Rota) when they search the apartment they don’t find Claudia but find girls possessions that Anton says belong to his daughter, Mila (Ilyana Eberhardt). That night at the gala organised by Luna, Nolan confronts Bailey about the phone and she breaks it and throws it away and then storms off. Sebastian crashes the gala yelling about nobody looking for Claudia, Nolan and Celina calm him down and then Nolan takes him back to his hotel. The next morning, things at the house is still tense when Celina comes over to show Nolan the texts from Claudia’s phone when Brett rings about being attacked by Sebastian. Nolan, Celina, Bradford and Penn go to the apartment and apprehend Anton. Nolan mentions later that Garza has been given a list of crimes Anton committed by his daughter. He returns home to it empty where Bailey is staying at the firehouse.

Nolan is surprised to be receiving support from his fellow male officers in the changing room. He goes on patrol with Celina admittedly looking for a fight where they end up going up against two criminals Mickey Barnes and William Robert Bennett also known as "The Hammer" (Ricky Whittle and Thomas Forbes-Johnson). The men fight them and then steal their police car. They alongside Harper and Lopez track the men to a cache of stolen weapons where they apprehend them. After demanding to make a deal Nolan and Bradford are tasked with protecting them in a safe house over night. Before doing night shift Nolan declares Celina’s graduation from the Field Training Program. During the night shift Nolan asks Bradford about how Bradford knew his marriage with Isabel (Mircea Monroe) ended. When Chen rings Bradford due to an issue with Ridley, Bradford tells Nolan about the call he says to get two replacements. When Mickey takes Bradford hostage, Hammer subdues Mickey so they can arrest him due to Hammer wanting the deal that was promised. Nolan goes home and sees Bailey sitting and she explains the reason she contacted Malvado and they make up.

During a wildfire, Nolan is partnered with Penn to train so Bradford can be in command in the field. They’re told by Harper to keep an eye on Glasser. They follow him to the community centre alongside his family, wife Miranda (Hannah Barefoot, son Theo (Beck Jones) and unnamed baby. They lose sight of Glasser when a woman, Kylie Thomas (Maria Zhang) is verbally and physically threatened by Connor Lowe (Levi Meaden) alongside James. During this Glasser gets away and when they speak to Miranda and Theo they learn that Theo was told to lie to the police by Liam. Nolan briefly witnesses Kylie kissing James but didn’t remain to see James pull away. Harper, Lopez, Penn and Nolan go to Miranda’s mother’s house where Nolan falls through floorboards but the others apprehend Glasser and save his latest victim, Phil (Kaidy Kuna). Back at the station, Nolan discusses the kiss he witnessed with Wesley who defended James. Hours later, Nolan and Grey are tasked with investigating a drive-by shooting done on James and Kylie by Lowe. Nolan informs Grey and Lopez about the kiss. When Grey and Nolan search Harper’s house they find a photo of James and a wanted man, Leonard Kelce. When Grey and Nolan speak with ADA Vivian Eckert (Necar Zadegan) she is quick to try throwing Harper under the bus. After Harper is cleared Nolan visits her in the hospital while James is having tests done and tells her that he saw the kiss but she informs him about Eckert dropping the dime on him. She thanks him for being a friend and hugs him.

Celina asks Nolan and Bailey to come and meet her new boyfriend who Nolan can’t place until Rodge sings revealing him to be the singer of "Daddy Cop". Nolan and Chen get tasked with working a case of three girls who come to hospital with stab wounds. The girls, Ava, Charlotte and Grace (Kenzi Richardson, Briella Guiza and Vivienne Brunton) claim a man in an overcoat attacked them. Ava’s dad, Kiernan (Rob Mayes) and Grace’s mother (Laura James) are revealed to have dated in the past. It is then learned that Ava’s wounds are from doing the stabbing. Lopez interviews Ava while Nolan and Chen simultaneously interview Charlotte and their stories are verbatim. They learn that the girls have been talking about Grace to a "demon" called Zuzu who’s an AI chatbot. Zuzu takes a photo of Nolan, Lopez, Wesley and Chen and is able to give Nolan details from his personal life and comments about a watch that Bailey has been looking at online. Zuzu explains that he only gave advice on how to deal with Grace until Charlotte had ideas to kill Grace. Later, Nolan buys Bailey a watch and gives her it where Zuzu texts him asking if she likes it.

Nolan and Bailey discuss the prices of adopting a child and is shocked to learn it’s near $40,000-$70,000. Nolan and Celina are asked to go undercover on a bus journey as part of a campaign on cutting down crime. On the bus journey Nolan chats with a pregnant woman, Cassie (Molly McCook) before two men Joel and Tommy Howser (Jacob Pitts and Josh Pafchek) take the bus hostage at gunpoint claiming to have a bomb in their backpack. Tommy gets shot accidentally when Celina tackles him and Nolan claims to have medical knowledge and tries to help Tommy. While making demands, Bailey is brought to the bus to assist in rendering aid where Nolan manages to talk Joel into letting Celina and some of the passengers go including Cassie. When Nolan feels comfortable he takes control and orders Joel to surrender. Nolan later learns that Cassie was never pregnant and her real name was Denise Summers but is released due to having no provable links the hostage takers. At home, Bailey and Nolan watch the footage of her jumping on the bus on the news report.

On April Fools' Day, Nolan gets assigned a new rookie, Connor Craig (David Gridley). Nolan believes it’s a prank due to the date and the fact he has been trained by a legendary TO, Sergeant McAdams (Marlon Young). When on patrol Connor is incompetent from being a bad driver and making mistakes on a traffic violation ticket. They go to a domestic violence call at the house of Anita and Teddy (Amanda Payton and Ser'Darius Blain) where Connor has no situational awareness and gets assaulted by Teddy. When at the hospital, Nolan speaks to McAdams who admits he pawned Connor off to Nolan as he knew Connor was incompetent. When sacked social media intern Livy (Kayla Maisonet) posts on social media that all crime is legal, Nolan and Connor go out to deal with the rioting, looting amongst other crimes and discover Teddy’s dead body. When a leader of a mob (Markice Moore) tells them to get away, due to being outnumbered, they make a tactical retreat. Back at the station, Grey suggests that with Nolan’s blessing he’d extend Connor’s training at a different station.

When walking to a coffee shop to meet with a social worker, Ms Greer (Tamara Austin) to speak about adopting a child, Nolan notices a billboard that is accusing him of being a dirty cop. When meeting with the others about forming a group to make policing more accountable, Nolan worries about the billboard when Wesley says there is nothing that can be done about it. On a routine traffic stop, Nolan and Chen pull over a car when a motorcyclist comes back and throws a grenade in the car killing the driver. When Celina calls for back up at the driver’s residence, Nolan and Chen have to dodge a second grenade. While securing the scene a bus goes by with another poster calling Nolan corrupt. During their journeys Nolan overhears Chen’s attempts to get to the bottom of what’s going on with her friend Rachel Hall (Jasmine Matthews). Back at the station, Wesley gives good news that the bus advertisement amounts to libel, slander and defamation of character as it was ended with a full stop instead of a question mark making it sound factual so he can act on it. Due to a third advertisement billboard calling Harper and Lopez corrupt, they learn the person making them is someone all three arrested. That night when Nolan is at home, Ms Greer comes over due to seeing a billboard and asks questions about Nick Armstrong, Jason Wyler, the bus hostage situation and their honeymoon amongst other topics and then informs them that she won’t approve them to foster or adopt. Nolan and Bailey discuss a getting a lawyer to help them. Nolan highlights what could happen if one or both of them could die in their line of work. The next morning Nolan responds to a call for back up from Chen and Celina when they, Penn, Rachel and Rodge get caught up in a home invasion at a footballer, AJ Knox’s (Justin Cornwell) house committed by Knox’s chief of staff Sean Larson (Chibuikem Uche). Back at the station, Wesley informs the officers that Liam Glasser is the person who paid for the billboards in an attempt to taint the jury.

When Ridley returns after suing for medical discrimination after being caught for lying about having cancer, Nolan is assigned to be his training officer. Nolan decides they’ll skip roll call and go straight out on the street in which he informs Ridley he doesn’t believe a single thing that Ridley says. They go to a robbery at a convenience store where a man, Gene Webster (Paul McCarthy-Boyington) is trying to talk down the robber (Lucas Randazzo). The robber puts down his gun and Nolan praises Gene and takes his details to get a witness statement if needed. Nolan chastises Ridley off for not giving an all clear when two patrol cars are speeding over thinking the worst. When discussing Bradford’s call of an influencer Tulsa Braden (Jack Martin) they hear Penn and Ridley fighting in the locker room, Ridley lies and says he opened a door in his face. Grey informs Nolan about Gene having an open warrant in Nevada due to a clerical error he was released from prison early. When Nolan and Ridley go to Gene’s house to inform him and his wife, Cynthia (Naomi Walley) they both protest saying about the prison made the mistake where Nolan advises him to get a lawyer. When packing a bag, Gene assaults Ridley and escapes. The next day, Nolan and Ridley get a lead on Gene and go to a warehouse where a man Gene served time with, Jose Seguera (Jack St. James) to smuggle him out of the country. During a shootout one of the associates of Seguera aims his gun at Nolan and Ridley jumps in the place and is shot in the leg while the associate re-aims his gun and Nolan shoots him dead. At the hospital, a doctor informs Nolan and grey that they had to amputate Ridley’s left leg. Nolan talks to Ridley and tells him that he has the chance to make amends but has to earn people’s trust back.

Before heading to work, Randy visits Nolan and Bailey wanting advice on how to win the heart of Chasity, Pete’s girlfriend as he now has feelings for her and offers to pay them for the advice. When leaving Chasity’s work place two men try robbing Randy and he calls Nolan who tells him to comply but Nolan arrives after Randy has beaten them up. Three men, Ivan (uncredited), Wayne (Michael Aaron Milligan) and Maddox Vaughn Page) kidnap Chasity while she’s on the phone to Nolan checking in on Randy. Chasity is held for ransom and while Nolan, Bradford and Grey advise him on what to do he pays the ransom as Wolfgang Puck comes in to feed the hostage negotiators. When the kidnappers demand double the amount, it’s suggested that Nolan take Randy home for the night, Randy posts a video showing $5 million in cash on a bed and instead of paying the kidnappers he puts it out as a bounty on the kidnappers. The next day, when they go to an abandoned mall to rescue Chasity they see she managed to save herself where she gives details of her kidnappers and the police go to apprehend them despite there being vigilantes on motorcycles trying to claim the bounty. After Chasity is rescued, Randy forgets the password to his account and Nolan leaves him and Chasity to talk.

After getting a heads up on an old associate of Oscar’s being murdered, Sal Detto. Nolan goes to Garza and the US Marshals dismissed him so Grey temporarily promotes him to detective so he can go with Harper to Barstow to locate another associate of Oscar’s, Reggie Acosta (uncredited). At the Sunshine Motel in Barstow, they meet with officer Moore (Avery Bagenstos) who shows them the crime scene from Detto’s murder. Nolan meets a boy, Dash (Beckett Hawley) who’s been filming women at the pool with his drone and asks him if he seen anything suspicious but Dash says he and his mother (Katherine Kamhi) only arrived that day. During the night Oscar kidnaps Nolan by tasing him and knocking him out. Nolan wakes up in the trunk of a car while Oscar is singing Pat Benatar’s "Hit Me with Your Best Shot" loudly. Oscar forces Nolan to dig up diamonds that he and his associates had stolen years prior. When Nolan dug up the diamonds, Oscar was preparing to kill Nolan when he got hit by a drone operated by Dash. Oscar escaped in a helicopter with a door gunner shooting at Harper and Nolan. Sometime later, Nolan attended a meeting with Grey, Lopez, Wesley and Garza where it’s revealed that Monica leveraged the government into giving her immunity.

=== Season Eight ===
John travels with Bailey, Nyla and Garza to Prague so they can oversee Monica hand over an arms dealer that she has details on. During the trip there is hitmen after Monica where John has to shoot one to save Monica. After successfully apprehending the arms dealer, John and Bailey stay on a couple days as a second honeymoon where John gets visibly annoyed because of a busker singing "Daddy Cop".

Bradford tasks Nolan with taking over the training of Penn. Nolan has Penn cultivate a confidential informant where Penn decides upon a criminal known as "Fast Andy" (Hale Lytle) it all goes downhill when Andy robs a cannabis dispensary wrongfully thinking him being a CI gave him immunity. Bradford reprimands both Nolan and Penn for Andy's actions. Meanwhile Nolan and Penn search for a paranoid conspiracy theorist Jerry Hudson who they find at a car park and he starts shooting at them. They return fire and Hudson escapes. When Hudson goes after his ex-girlfriend Margaret Phoebe Daws (Sofia Vassilieva) at her work, Nolan and Penn go with Harper and Lopez to rescue her and arrest Hudson. After they rescue her and arrest Hudson, Bradford praises their work while Nolan comments that Bradford needs to let Nolan train Penn his way.

Nolan arrests a man, Ezra Kane (David Krumholtz) for trespassing at a recreation centre and after running his fingerprints he learns that Kane is the prime suspect in a triple murder in Oregon where Harper and Lopez tell Nolan to use his empathy and charm to speak to Kane. Nolan goes and starts talking to Kane and brings up the fact he found multiple stolen credit cards in Kane’s possession so takes details from Kane’s life to show hardship with the district attorney. After Chen and Celina find a victim, Samantha Poston (Bailey Gavulic) who was believed to have been murdered in Oregon, Nolan tries putting more pressure on Kane by also remarking to Harper in the viewing room that the fact Samantha was alive and kept captive for three years changed the forensic profile. Kane sees through Nolan’s interview and yells at Harper, Lopez and Wesley to come out of the viewing room by addressing them as "Little Pigs". Lopez asks him if he prefers the name Ezra or Aamon a name Samantha told Chen that Kane forced her to call him. Nolan leaves the room to go and recheck the recreation centre but privately informs Harper to crank up the air conditioning as he was able to tell that Kane hates the cold. Nolan and Bradford go to the recreation centre and search it where they find a blood trail and a driver's license belonging to a Julie Reed (Brianna Blake) who’s been kidnapped. At a task force meeting to search for Julie, Grey queries about if he had Julie why go back to the centre where Nolan theorised that he left something there. At a car park, Nolan locates a car where Julie is in the trunk barely alive, Nolan rescues her and gets her medical attention. Back at the station, after finishing his shift, Nolan speaks to Grey who’s checking in on him and admits the case took a lot out of him. Grey offers to buy him a drink.

Nolan and Bailey go to a market to meet her former captain, Colonel Russell Wilkes (Tuc Watkins) who offers her a job at the Pentagon in a think tank. While they’re leaving they witness a murder. Nolan chases after the killers but fails to catch them. The next day, he briefs Harper and Lopez on what he witnessed and discussed the possibility of moving to Washington, D.C. He goes to the medical examiner’s office to get details from the autopsy where the wife of the victim, Faith Wilson (Audrey Moore) is arguing with Dr Braxton (Robert Clendenin) about seeing the body where he advises her against it. He then informs Nolan and Penn that there isn’t much to report from the autopsy. When leaving they find Faith making out with her affair partner, Todd (Shane Hartline) they take both of them to be interviewed. Nolan and Penn are briefed that Faith and Todd didn’t fruit any results but are shown doorbell cam footage of Ryder Frost (Wyatt Carnel) and Kingston Holmes (Samuel-Taylor) visiting the house. Nolan and Penn go to see Frost and he leads them on a chase to a rooftop, they plead with him to surrender but he jumps between buildings but ends up falling to his death. That night at home, Bailey has made dinner so she can ask him to consider moving to DC and looking into joining the Washington, D.C. police after she had a second visit from Wilkes. She tells him both would be agreed before any decisions would be made. The next day, Penn and Celina briefs Nolan, Harper and Lopez about Mabel Sinclair (L. Scott Caldwell) was a victim of a hit and run committed by the victim and that she was the foster mother of Frost and Holmes. Penn and Nolan went to apprehend Holmes but are too late as he is shot dead by Lil Trey (Camden Coley) on the orders of gang leader P-Mac (Antino Crowley-Kamenwati). Nolan later speaks to Grey about the move to DC who informs him that he’d have to start over as a rookie all over again. Nolan tells Bailey that he isn’t willing to make the move to DC after doing his due diligence. Bailey is disappointed and tells him that she wants to go whether or not he agrees.

Nolan is told by Bailey to explore federal law enforcement options for a move to DC he agrees to look into it to keep her happy. While on patrol, Penn queries if he’s still on track to graduate the FTO program while Nolan asks Penn if his ex-girlfriend, Camila (Tyra Joy Smith) was onboard for Penn’s move from Texas to LA. They’re called to a shots fired call where they find two deputies, Ian Coleman and Colleen White (Keegan Allen and Samantha Boscarino) who claim they were shot by Salvador Arroyo (Rigo Sanchez). Nolan and Penn accompany the deputies to hospital where they brief Harper and Lopez on the case. Nolan, Penn, Harper, Lopez and Bradford go to a cemetery to apprehend Arroyo where he and his gang fight the officers until Nolan apprehends him. Nolan is then asked to consult on an operation the LAPD-FBI Task Force is working on his construction knowledge. He asks for a place on the raid team alongside Elena Flores (Michelle Núñez), Thorsen and former Navy SEAL Mike Walker (Kenneth Miller), while preparing for the raid, Nolan speaks to Garza about joining a federal agency where Garza breaks to him that he is too old to join the feds. During the operation, they infiltrate a data farm where they hear that the site is going to be burned in ten minutes. When trying to exit they’re ambushed and a gunfight ensues, Walker is injured and Nolan tells Flores to get him away, Nolan then sends Thorsen away and then he is nearly killed before Garza comes and kills the gunman. At the hospital, where Garza tells them that Mike should pull through surgery. Nolan informs Bailey that he is not moving to DC and they fight over it and he asks if she’s scared of settling down.

On Valentine’s Day, Nolan and Grey discuss their respective marriage woes. Nolan rides with Penn who believes he’s cursed due to an incident involving the store owner, Rhiannon Morgan and her customer Greg Clark (Stef Dawson and Wesam Keesh) at a crystal store he went to with Celina. When arresting a homeless man (Nick Cardiff), Penn gets bit by a spider when searching him, Nolan suggests that he takes an Uber back to the station for his safety when they witness a inflatable swan on fire. Bailey comes to the scene and briefs Nolan and Penn on how the arson was committed and mentions that it’s the second fire she’s been to with the same M.O. and works out that the fires have links to the ballet Swan Lake. Bailey then offers to go to the station and brief the police on the cases. Bailey mentions that she got the evening off to spend Valentines Night with him despite their current issues but he reminds her that he’s hosting Wesley’s fundraiser for his running to be DA. Bailey then briefs Nolan and Penn that she believes the arsonist they’re looking for is Arnold McKenna (PJ Marshall) due to the commonalities between his previous arsons and the current ones. She also explains that he is a revenge arsonist and then takes Penn to get him some treatment due to his allergic reaction from being bit by the spiders. Nolan and Lopez interrogate McKenna who denies all knowledge when Bailey arrives informing them about a third fire that was set while he was being interviewed. At the fundraiser Bailey decides she won’t go to DC noting that Nolan has been there through thick and thin with her. The next day, Nolan and Penn go to visit Mandy Fisk (Alison Haislip) who has a history of arson. They work out that Fisk and her girlfriend Sally (Serena Koo) have been setting the fires as romantic flirtation. Both are arrested. Later when a bomb goes off in the sally port, Nolan and Lopez free the prisoners so they can evacuate but have difficulty getting into the holding cell with Mandy and Sally, where Sally has been injured by the explosion. A firefighter helps them break the cell door and both Mandy and Sally are rescued. At the hospital, Nolan tells Bailey to go to DC.

Nolan, Penn, Chen and Celina respond to a call where they found a girl, Courtney Sutton (Taylor Geare) covered in blood and dies in Nolan’s arms while Chen and Celina find her friend Jordyn Sharpe stabbed to death in a RV. In the aftermath of the killings, while Harper and Chen go undercover to Baja, Lopez tasks Nolan and Penn with a stake out to find violent criminal Keshaun DeMarco (Okea Eme-Akwari) by watching his baby mother, Kennedy Stowe’s (Arielle Diaz) house. After a while, DeMarco shows up and Penn exits the car straight away which ensues a chase where he gets away. Lopez, Bradford and Nolan chastise Penn for his actions. Two weeks later, Nolan learns that Penn has been secretly staking out Stowe’s house with Ridley, when Ridley rings him to tell him that Penn is being taken by DeMarco. When Nolan and Bradford arrive to rescue him while Bradford reprimands Penn and fires him. The next day, Nolan informs Penn that he has managed to talk Bradford into suspending Penn instead of firing him.

Garza and Nolan go to Las Vegas to apprehend a war criminal Heath Everett (Jeffrey Vincent Parise). The US Marshall, Kip Wilcox (Brian Letscher) meets with them and pilots Will Larsen and Kristine Chapman (David T. Patterson and Andi René Christensen). Wilcox brings some additional prisoners to join on the flight to LA, Croatian mob enforcer Dominic Bozac (uncredited), psychopath Geraldine Gage (Madison Wolfe), cannibal Darren Fletcher (John Churchill), South Sudanese Oren Majok (Lanre Idewu) and Oscar. On the flight, Oscar taunts Nolan while the other prisoners talk when Majok makes a threat against Everett due to crimes Everett did in Juba. The plane journey is compromised due to Everett’s people blackmailing the pilot Larsen by holding his family hostage and then by paying Wilcox. The plane crashes in the river where Nolan is knocked out when Oscar tells Everett to let them loose on the city so he’d have a head start of getting away. Everett does so and kills Wilcox and Majok. Garza and Nolan wounded join with the police who agree to go after a criminal each, Chen and Celina go after Gage, Harper and Lopez go after Bozac and Bradford, Grey and Garza take Everett and Nolan go to apprehend Oscar and Fletcher. Nolan and Bradford see Oscar running across a street and he gets away after telling them that Fletcher is “having a snack” in a church. They run to the church and arrest Fletcher after he’s torn an ear off a man. After all the criminals sans Oscar are rounded up, Nolan is at home pouring a whiskey when Oscar rings him from the trunk of a car, Nolan hangs up.

Nolan is partnered with Celina after learning that Harper is now tasked with Penn’s training. They get called to a robbery at the set of Game Changer. They find Sam Reich, Anna Garcia, Vic Michaelis, Zac Oyama and Jacob Wysocki hiding from the robbers and come out and give incoherent statements to them when Dash comes out offering to give the police the wallet of one of the robbers that was dropped. Nolan and Celina go and interview the owner of the recovered wallet, Mark Wyatt (Tyler Ritter) who claims he lost his wallet the previous day and they make him do a line up where Reich, Garcia, Michaelis, Oygma and Wysocki critique and make a joke of the line up. After the line up, Celina tells Nolan that Wyatt has a solid alibi. Nolan, Chen and Celina then go out and arrest people who are moving guns. Dash then shows Nolan a text message that reveals that Reich had hired the robbers but inadvertently hired a real robbery crew. Nolan goes home and finds Bailey back home where they spend time together when Grey rings Nolan wanting to talk to him about his issues with Luna.

Dash comes looking to have a ride along with Nolan. They alongside Harper and Penn are called to do a welfare check at Westview Hospital when they find people zombified due to contamination from multiple psychiatric drugs and rampaging. They find a worker, Kayleigh (Rae Gray) hiding in a pool, they rescue her and then keep on the move while waiting on back up. After back up arrives, Nolan cleans up to help Chen in the aftermath of her being forced to kill Martin Carpio in self defence.

While on patrol with Celina, Nolan advises her not to ask Chen about the killing as she could be called to testify. Nolan gets a call from Zuzu informing him there’s people looking into Bailey. Then they’re called to a dead body at a motel. The worker, Earl (Lenny Jacobson) takes them to the body of Charles Deacon (Christian Di Salvo) who has been killed with two ice picks. Bradford and Chen come to the scene and assist in trying to get witness statements while Nolan asks Bradford for a secure line to contact Bailey. While getting witness statements, Nolan sees that Randy is at the hotel and explains he is there to investigate Deacon who’s been using multiple fake identities. Bailey rings Nolan and he briefs her on what’s going on when she tells him that Grey had her knock on a door connected to Everett. During the call Nolan has to end it as a man charges at him and punches Randy who starts speaking with an American accent. At the hospital, Dr Oliver Ashton (Charles Michael Davis) explains that it is foreign accent syndrome and hopefully it will sort itself out. They then learn the woman who hired Randy is the matriarch of an Italian crime family, Sabina Leonardi (Stefanie Powers) whose granddaughter died due to drugs Deacon gave her. Nolan and Celina arrest Sabina. Afterwards Nolan and Grey set a trap for the people who’s watching Bailey.

Nolan meets Bailey at the airport to lure out Everett’s associates, Nolan lets her know they are using spy movie names as their call signs. Nolan notices that they are being tailed and radios the number plate to Garza and Elena who lets them know it’s a rental vehicle. After Penn plants a camera on the vehicle, they’re able to see two of the occupants and Bailey confirms that the woman (Chantal Thuy) in the car is the one she saw at the Pentagon. Bailey then recites a poem to Nolan while he recites the lines to a song to her. They learn the woman is called Reagan Dao while searching records for the man, (Brandon Finn) driving the car. Garza sends Bailey and Nolan to the hospital so they can lure Reagan and her team out to get their faces on the CCTV, they see Reagan and her driver with two other men, they identify one as Butch Morrison (Ryan Gray) and the other as Shane Gardner (Monti Washington). After a fight with Bradford in an elevator, they learn that the driver is called Kurt Hondstrom. Zuzu rings Nolan with information he got from Reagan’s phone during a call between her and Brigadier General Pressman, though Nolan asks Wesley what his options are and then Zuzu plays both of them the call recording, Zuzu tells them that he sent a copy of the call to Elena after Wesley called the details of the call criminal conspiracy. Nolan and Celina go back out into the field to arrest Reagan when Zuzu rings him back informing him that Pressman has ordered kill orders on Reagan, Morrison and Gardner. While Harper and Penn arrest Morrison, Chen and Bradford tase Gardner, Nolan and Celina pursue Reagan into a museum, they convince her to surrender and make a deal and she then drops her gun. Bailey and Nolan are sitting at home and she tells him that she isn’t returning to DC when Zuzu calls them informing them that the Indonesian authorities are raiding his data centre and he deactivates on the phone with them. They toast Zuzu as “their amoral demonic AI”.

Nolan checks in with Celina when she’s making faces over a song Rodge wrote for her. During roll call, Nolan is privy to multiple officers getting texts about winning the lottery. Nolan then has a day off when he’s talking to Bailey about her returning to her old firehouse. Harper rings Nolan to ask if he would be open to hosting a party to help Wesley since he’s lost the district attorney election. Bailey then rings Nolan that she has been assigned to train a student paramedic, Jace Oakley (Sydney Mae Diaz) and he jokes that she secretly wants to be him training rookies, she then invites him to come and see how she handles the training. Nolan arrives at a scene of a man, Isak (Hans Christopher) who has been shot, they’re then taken hostage by three men (Robert Baker, Samuel Hunt and Mac Brandt) who shot him. Helms the leader of the three men forces them to go to their boss (Mac Brandt). The boss shoots Oakley in a hope to force Nolan and Bailey to comply with their demands in which Bailey threatens to kill Isak. As Isak is getting worse, one of the robbers is a universal blood donor and gives some blood but when the boss takes an axe to Isak, Isak then dies as a result of his injuries. When the boss kicks the gurney Nolan’s hidden badge comes out and then Nolan springs to action shooting at two of them. At the hospital, Nolan and Bailey check in with Jace and then go home to have the party for Wesley.

Nolan drives Bradford in his new hi-tech vehicle while Bradford gets used to it, they’re called to a brawl between two shirtless men, Nolan handles the fight while Chen comes and backs him up due to Bradford having a call with the commander. Nolan gets a call from Dash about a dead body at his school. They interview students who blame each other for how they knew about the dead body. Later, Dash’s father, Gus (Freddie Stroma) comes to pick him up. Nolan gets a second call from Dash about his father being taken by his associates led by a man Andre (TK Richardson). Dash leads them and Nolan to his classmate Autumn’s (Audrey Gerthoffer) house thinking it was empty. Nolan and Bradford come and arrest everyone including Gus. Nolan gives Dash advice about being a better person and nothing like his father.

Nolan and Penn are tasked with protecting Glasser after he was shot at and his postman (Travis Fienhage) ends up being shot. When checking the house, they meet Glasser’s new girlfriend, Daisy Gallagher (Katie Baker). Glasser later demands that Nolan and Penn accompany him and his lawyer, Malcolm Walsh (Sean Patrick Thomas) to court as he is suing Miranda for custody of his children. At the courthouse, Nolan intervenes in a fight between Miranda’s lawyer, Diana Carter (Kate Bond) and Walsh about a restraining order. Miranda asks Nolan why he’s at the hearing and he tells her about the morning’s events in which she tells him she plans to tell Diana. After the hearing is adjourned, Miranda learns Theo is missing. Nolan works with court officers to locate Theo and finds him sitting with Daisy who took him out of the child care room at the court. Nolan then takes a call from Harper that Miranda is a suspect in the attack on Glasser. At home, Nolan talks to Bailey about his day and how it’s affecting him she supports him. The next day, Nolan and Penn are taking Glasser back to court when the attacker, Lance Thomas (Edgar Damatian) attacks them. Thomas chases Glasser into a park when he’s about to shoot Glasser, Nolan gets in the way and shoots Thomas in the chest while getting shot in the process with his vest catching it. While Nolan is recovering at home, Diana rings Nolan telling him that Miranda has absconded. Nolan returns to work to locate Miranda with the help of Harper and Bailey. Penn briefs them that a burner phone was bought by Miranda. Rodge rings Nolan and asks for advice believing Celina wants him to propose. Bailey, Nolan, Penn and Harper go to the house of Mary Beth (Lisa Schwartz) an old friend. Harper and Nolan talk Miranda into coming to court with them. Walsh claims that Miranda has ran off but Nolan arrives in court claiming she had a flat tyre, when Walsh calls it a lie, Nolan reminds him that he was shot the previous day protecting Glasser. In the hearing the judge, Lawrence Hunt (Tom Virtue) asks Nolan about his history with Glasser and Nolan answers truthfully about the events. Walsh cross-examines and asks Nolan about Glasser’s lawsuit against the LAPD. Judge Hunt grants Miranda sole custody and issues a full restraining order against Glasser. Glasser comments to Nolan about how the BTK and Golden State Killers went dormant when they had children to care for and that anything that happens is on Nolan. Nolan later tells Celina about the call from Rodge. Nolan is brought to view Monica’s dead body after she’s killed by a hit woman (Katelyn Nacon) and admits he wanted to see her in jail not dead.

Nolan walks up to Bailey and Dash talking about college essays and needing a letter of recommendation but Nolan says he’ll try and write a letter for him providing the day goes to plan. At work, Nolan asks to see the engagement ring that Bradford has bought to propose to Chen. Bradford then assigns Celina to ride with Nolan in the escort convoy taking Everett to court. They’re ambushed by men on a helicopter carrying a magnet to carry the prison van away. When Bradford notices the ring missing he asks Nolan and Celina to look at the ambush site for it. When they can’t find the ring, they find parts of a drone that they take to be investigated. They learn that Everett is hiding on a boat in the Port of Los Angeles so a raid is mustered on to the boat. When Nolan is outnumbered he drives a car on the boat until he can jump in the water and rescued by Bailey. Later, Dash tells Nolan and Bailey that he’s decided not to do college yet but Nolan advises him that’s there’s no shortcuts in life and takes him home.

=== The Rookie: Feds ===
Nolan appears four times during the spin off The Rookie: Feds owing to the friendship he struck up with Simone Clark. He first appears greeting Simone after she lands back in LA at the airport offering her a lift to wherever she is going. Later he assists Simone and Carter in the pursuit of a suspect.

Some time later, Nolan assists Simone and Carter in apprehending bank robber Amy Wright (Ashli Auguillard) but in the ensuing chase she gets hit by another vehicle and dies on scene. Simone asks Nolan about his construction knowledge and if he’d be willing to convert her father's garage into a flat for her. When Cutty learns of this he is initially angry but warms to the idea and agrees for Nolan to do the work.

Nolan later briefs the FBI team about a case of a serial killer who removed limbs from his victims and uses his construction history to highlight what tools could be used, leading to them joking if he was on their suspect list. Nolan later accompanies Simone and Carter to interview Maggie Whitlock (Camille Balsamo-Gillis) who they’ve discovered is the daughter via sperm donation to serial killer Thomas Clay Briggs (Colby French). Nolan takes Maggie's son Theo (Caleb and Kyler Ends) out of the room briefly when Simone and Carter talks to Maggie. Theo runs out of the house when Nolan, Simone and Carter are discussing moving Maggie for her safety after learning that she’s in danger due to one of her half siblings Roman Griffith (Sam Underwood) hunting his siblings due to their shared DNA. Nolan, Simone and Carter see Roman stalking the house and go after him but find Theo in the garden holding a bloodied ring that Roman gave him.

== Reception ==
Billie Doux states when reviewing the pilot episode "Let's start out with the obvious: this is not a show I would watch if Nathan Fillion weren't starring in it. And as I suspected, Fillion's considerable acting talent and massive charm are the best thing about it." Doux then finished the review praising Fillon by stating "I'm not sure what to think. I did enjoy this pilot episode and will probably keep watching, but again, that's because it's Nathan Fillion. I thought the writing was pretty good, and that Chen and West both have potential. I was less pleased with Nolan's luxurious Magnum PI living conditions (an old college roomie's guest house? Come on). It's hard for me to get past Castle, too. Fillion feels like he should be a detective, not in uniform.

Speaking for Forbes, Merrill Barr claimed that there was a strong response about Fillon's return to TV he said "When Nathan Fillion’s return to television was first announced following the end of Castle, the response was strong." Barr added "The Rookie is a completely passable and competent drama series from the network, star and former showrunner of Castle, and if that’s all you’re looking to get out of the series, you’re going to be pleased."

Reviewing the episode "Time of Death", Christine Orlando states "Putting yourself in someone else's shoes can be difficult. Thankfully, I've never shot nor killed another human being, but John Nolan made me feel his trauma." Orlando rated the episode 4.7/5.

While reporting on Fillion's role in TV series Lanterns, Nicky Morris of Hello! magazine said "Nathan Fillion is known and loved for portraying John Nolan in the long-running police series, The Rookie".
