= Titus Makin Jr. =

American actor, singer, and dancer (born 1989)

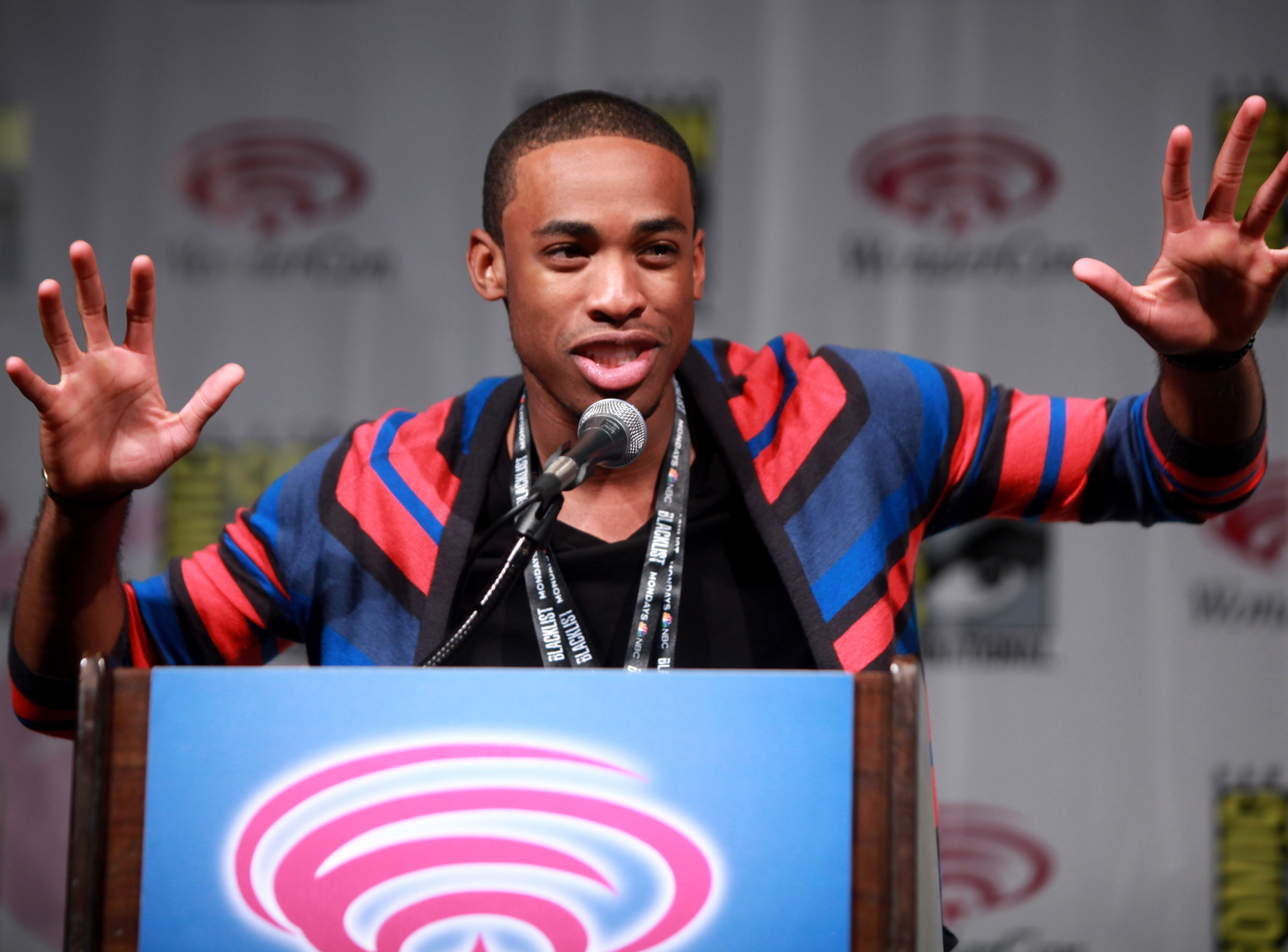
- Makin in 2014
- Born: June 10, 1989 (age 37); Honolulu, Hawaii, United States
- Other name: Butterfly Ali
- Education: New York Conservatory for Dramatic Arts
- Occupations: Actor; dancer; singer; songwriter
- Years active: 2009–present
- Musical career
- Genres: Soul; R&B; funk; hip hop

Titus Odell Makin Jr. (born June 10, 1989), also known by his musical stage name Butterfly Ali, is an American actor, singer, dancer, and songwriter. He is best known for his role as Jackson West in the ABC police procedural television series The Rookie (2018–2021). He has also portrayed characters in television series such as David in Glee (2010–2012), Lukas Parnell in Star-Crossed (2014), Clark Wilkins in Pretty Little Liars (2015), and Caleb Matthews in The Path (2018). Additionally, Makin also played Trey in the 2021 feature film On the Come Up. Furthermore, he is a singer and songwriter, blending elements of soul, R&B, funk, and hip hop in his work.

== Early life and education ==
Titus Makin Jr. was born on June 10, 1989, in Honolulu, Hawaii, where he lived for the first three years of his life. His father was a soldier and his family moved around the United States, including stops in Colorado and Arizona, as well as in Germany. He also has a sister. Growing up, Makin took up sports, singing and performing, and practiced gymnastics and dance. He began acting in high school, performing in school musicals, and after graduating, he attended the New York Conservatory for Dramatic Arts. While there, he also became an acrobat and dancer for the cheerleading teams of the New York Knicks and New York Liberty.

== Acting career ==
In 2009, Makin moved to Los Angeles, where he began acting in films and television series. From 2010 to 2012, he portrayed David, a recurring character in the Fox musical comedy drama Glee, and in 2011, he played Mickey O'Malley in the direct-to-video teen comedy musical film A Cinderella Story: Once Upon a Song. Later, Makin portrayed Lukas Parnell in The CW science fiction romantic teen drama series Star-Crossed (2014), Clark Wilkins in the Freeform mystery teen drama series Pretty Little Liars (2015), and Caleb Matthews in the Hulu drama series The Path (2018). From 2018 to 2021, he also had the leading role of Jackson West in the first three seasons of the ABC police procedural television series The Rookie. Furthermore, he appeared in television series such as The Closer (2011), Grimm (2012), Castle (2013), Grey's Anatomy (2014), NCIS (2014), FBI (2019), and NCIS: Hawaiʻi (2021). In 2022, Makin portrayed Trey in the Paramount+ musical drama feature film On the Come Up.

== Musical career ==
Makin is also a singer and songwriter, blending elements of soul, R&B, funk, and hip hop, among others. Since 2020, he has performed under the stage name Butterfly Ali, in homage to Muhammad Ali. His singles include "Pray for 'Em", "5 Minutes", "Listen to Me", "Rose", and "Righteous".

== Personal life ==
Makin identifies as Christian.

== Filmography ==
=== Films ===
Year	Title	Role	Notes
2009	Ticked	Jamie	Short film
2009	Tran-si-tions	Subway boyfriend	Short film
2010	Taking a Stand	Shawn	Short film
2011	A Cinderella Story: Once Upon a Song	Mickey O'Malley	Direct-to-video film
2011	Game of Your Life	Zach Taylor	Direct-to-video film
2011	Glee: The 3D Concert Movie	David	Documentary film
2011	Glee: The 3D Concert Movie	Himself	Documentary film
2013	So This Is Christmas	Jason	Direct-to-video film
2017	Once Upon a Date	Charlie	Television series
2018	Marital Bliss	Rick	Short film
2021	Aliens on Halloween	Jerry Butterfly	Short film
2022	Pool Service, Inc.	Xavier	Short film
2022	On the Come Up	Trey	Feature film
2024	Sins of the Bride	Jack Benson	Feature film

=== Television series ===
Year	Title	Role	Notes
2009	Celebrity Ghost Stories	Rob's brother	Episode no. 9
2010–2012	Glee	David	Recurring role; 10 episodes
2011	The Closer	Lewis Rivers	Episode: "Necessary Evil" (no. 99)
2011	Victorious	Dancer	2 episodes
2012	Grimm	Brandon Kingston	Episode: "The Other Side" (no. 30)
2012	Castle	Tim Cabot	Episode: "Secret Santa" (no. 90)
2013–2014	Buffering	Roger Murtaugh	2 episodes
2014	Grey's Anatomy	Rick Schultz	Episode: "Risk" (no. 228)
2014	NCIS	Thomas Burke	Episode: "Alleged" (no. 255)
2014	Perception	Charlie Clark	Episode: "Brotherhood" (no. 22)
2014	Star-Crossed	Lukas Parnell	Leading role; 10 episodes
2015	Key & Peele	Young man at a bar	Episode: "A Cappella Club" (no. 45)
2015	NCIS: New Orleans	Officer Boone	Episode: "I Do" (no. 27)
2015	Pretty Little Liars	Clark Wilkins	Recurring role; 5 episodes
2018	The Path	Caleb Matthews	Recurring role; 11 episodes
2018–2021	The Rookie	Jackson West	Leading role; 54 episodes
2019	FBI	Art Perkins	Episode: "What Lies Beneath" (no. 20)
2019	Millennials: The Musical	Elise	Webseries; 3 episodes
2019	Millennials: The Musical	DJ Downward Dog	Webseries; 3 episodes
2020	Wayward Guide for the Untrained Eye	Silas Torsen	Recurring role; webseries; 10 episodes
2021	NCIS: Hawaiʻi	Adam Parish	Episode: "The Tourist" (no. 6)
