= The Rookie series 8 =

Eight series of The Rookie

The Rookie
- Series 8
- Starring: Nathan Fillion; Alyssa Diaz; Richard T. Jones; Melissa O'Neil; Eric Winter; Mekia Cox; Shawn Ashmore; Jenna Dewan; Lisseth Chavez; Deric Augustine
- No. of episodes: 18

Release
- Original release: January 6 – May 4, 2026

Series chronology
- ← Previous; Series 7

The eight season of the American police procedural television series The Rookie premiered on ABC on January 6, 2026, and concluded on May 5, 2026.

The season consists of 18 episodes and continues the story of John Nolan (Nathan Fillion), and his fellow officers at the Los Angeles Police Department's Mid-Wilshire Division.

The series stars Nathan Fillion as John Nolan, alongside Alyssa Diaz, Richard T. Jones, Melissa O'Neil, Eric Winter, Mekia Cox, Shawn Ashmore, Jenna Dewan, Lisseth Chavez, and Deric Augustine.

The eighth season begins just days after the events of the seventh season finale. John Nolan (Nathan Fillion), Nyla Harper (Mekia Cox) and Bailey Nune (Jenna Dewan) travel to Prague to work alongside FBI agent Matthew Garza (Felix Solis) and criminal lawyer Monica Stevens (Bridget Regan) as part of an international operation targeting a notorious arms dealer.

The operation becomes increasingly dangerous as the team attempts to prevent the criminal organisation from carrying out its plans. Meanwhile, the remaining officers of the Mid-Wilshire Division continue their investigations in Los Angeles, working to dismantle the organisation's local operations.

Back in Los Angeles, the season follows Nolan and his colleagues as they deal with new criminal investigations and personal challenges. Nolan continues his work as a training officer, while Celina Juarez (Lisseth Chavez) and Miles Penn (Deric Augustine) develop their policing careers.

Tim Bradford (Eric Winter) takes on additional leadership responsibilities, while Lucy Chen (Melissa O'Neil) continues her progression within the LAPD. Their relationship develops further as they attempt to rebuild their future together.

The season also introduces Tim's mother, Joy Bradford (Sela Ward), bringing a new perspective to his family history. Meanwhile, Aaron Thorsen (Tru Valentino) makes a return to the series.

== Cast ==
- Nathan Fillion as John Nolan
- Alyssa Diaz as Angela Lopez
- Richard T. Jones as Wade Grey
- Melissa O'Neil as Lucy Chen
- Eric Winter as Tim Bradford
- Mekia Cox as Nyla Harper
- Shawn Ashmore as Wesley Evers
- Jenna Dewan as Bailey Nune
- Lisseth Chavez as Celina Juarez
- Deric Augustine as Miles Penn

=== Recurring ===
- Patrick Keleher as Seth Ridley
- Tru Valentino as Aaron Thorsen

== Episodes ==
No. overall	No. in season	Title	Directed by	Written by	Original release date	Prod. code	U.S. viewers (millions)
127	1	"Czech Mate"	Bill Roe	Alexi Hawley	January 6, 2026	801	N/A
As part of her immunity agreement, Monica agrees to assist an inter-agency task force in taking down a list of notorious criminals. Their first assignment is in Prague, where she arranges a meet with an arms trafficker under Nolan and Bailey's supervision, while Garza and Harper run point, and the rest of the Mid-Wilshire crew coordinates back in L.A. to arrest the trafficker's associates. The operation becomes complicated when Monica is targeted by hitmen sent by Jakob Olmstead. Back in L.A., Grey and Luna face complications in their marriage caused by their careers, while Tim and Lucy continue to dance around whether or not to reunite as a couple, and Miles is surprised by Smitty telling him that Shangri-La is becoming a homeowners' association, and Miles must now pay rent or face eviction. After the Prague operation is a success, Garza offers Harper a permanent role on the task force, then offers it to Grey when Harper declines. Grey accepts, while Tim and Lucy reconcile and agree to move in together, rescuing Miles, who agrees to move in with Celina. Nolan and Bailey use their remaining stay in Prague as a do-over honeymoon after their first was a disaster.
128	2	"Fast Andy"	Wendey Stanzler	Brynn Malone	January 13, 2026	802	N/A
Following Grey's reassignment, Tim is promoted to watch commander, and Lucy is transferred back to day shift as supervisor while Nolan is assigned as Miles's T.O., in time for a presidential visit to L.A. Following a less-than-glamorous case, Lopez and Harper contemplate alternate careers as they are tasked with tracking suspected criminals for the Secret Service. One such person, Jerry Hudson, is found to own numerous dangerous weapons and is unable to be located, beginning a manhunt. Nolan helps Miles cultivate his first C.I., and Miles chooses local criminal Fast Andy against Nolan's advice, leading to trouble when Miles promises he can let Andy go on small crimes, and Andy robs a dispensary. Lucy is assigned to finalize the motorcade route for the president and, in an effort to compartmentalize her relationship with Tim, declines his help. Harper and Lopez learn that Hudson is going after his ex-girlfriend, and they, along with Nolan and Miles, track him down to her workplace, where he is arrested. In the end, Lopez decides not to quit, and settles on a date with Wesley, while Tim and Lucy celebrate finally moving in together with a night out of their own with Kojo.
129	3	"The Red Place"	John Terlesky	Alexi Hawley & Brynn Malone	January 20, 2026	803	N/A
Nolan arrests a seemingly harmless homeless man named Ezra Kane on a simple breaking and entering charge, but it flags a three-year-old triple homicide case in Oregon. While Harper and Lopez dig into the case, they ask Nolan to conduct the interview. As he does and as the rest of the Mid-Wilshire crew dig deeper into the case, the terrifying truth begins to become clear, particularly when Samantha, the believed deceased teenage daughter of Ezra's other victims, is found alive. Ezra soon reveals he has taken a new girl, and the team mobilizes to find her, which Nolan soon does in a downtown parking garage. Lucy is able to help Samantha to begin healing by recounting her own trauma from when she was kidnapped and buried alive by Caleb Wright. Meanwhile, Miles reaches out to Seth and tries to convince him to get his life back in order. Seth is initially still locked in self-pity and standoffish with Miles, but soon agrees to let Miles help him get back on track. Elsewhere, Lopez freaks out over having forgotten her anniversary, and Tim and Lucy work on getting her unpacked while Grey takes Nolan out for a drink.
130	4	"Cut and Run"	Tori Garrett	Natalie Callaghan	January 26, 2026	804	N/A
Nolan and Bailey have dinner with her former CO. He offers her a job in D.C. before they witness a murder. The police learn the shooters were from rival gangs and pursue one of them, which ends with him dying. They learn the shooters committed the murder because the victim injured their foster mother. The second shooter, Kingston, turns to his gang for help, but they turn on him. The police intervene, subduing all the suspects, though Kingston is killed. Meanwhile, Wesley and Lopez consider buying a bigger house. Wesley is approached by the Democratic Party to run against Vivian in the upcoming DA election. Harper, James, and Lopez support the idea, as he would be able to make change in the judicial system. Lucy needs to find evidence Smitty incorrectly files it. Tim begins to doubt his abilities as watch commander. They find the evidence, and Lucy assures Tim he is more than capable. Bailey and Nolan talk about the job offer. He is against it as moving to D.C. would mean starting his police career all over again, but Bailey admits she does not want to turn it down.
131	5	"The Network"	Ryan Krayser	Fredrick Kotto	February 2, 2026	805	N/A
Aaron returns to Mid-Wilshire to assist with the task force. Garza and Grey have him reconnect with Kadeer Gazmi, his former cellmate and a drug trafficker, to infiltrate a private network for elite criminals by having him warn Kadeer. The ruse works, and they track the network to a server farm, which Nolan infiltrates with a team including Garza's niece, Elena, and Aaron in an attempt to upload malware. The team succeeds and escapes when the facility is torched. Monica secretly calls to warn Kadeer about the network breach. The police have to find a C.I. who shot two deputy sheriffs. The police confront the C.I. at a cemetery, where they take him into custody. Lucy and Celina notice evidence that contradicts the sheriffs' statements. The evidence and the C.I.'s statement point to them having an affair, leading to an argument in which they shot each other. When confronted by Lopez and Harper, the deputies instantly admit. Wesley prepares to announce his candidacy for district attorney. The attempt initially goes poorly, but Wesley is able to make a good first impression as a candidate. Nolan and Bailey argue over the job offer, and Bailey storms out.
132	6	"Burn 4 Love"	Lanre Olabisi	Moira Kirland	February 9, 2026	806	N/A
On Valentine's Day, Nolan and Bailey have to solve a string of romantically themed arsons. The method of starting the fires is similar to a known serial arsonist, Arnold McKenna, who is questioned. However, the trail leads to another arsonist, Mandy Fisk, who set the fires with her girlfriend as a Valentine's Day celebration using Arnold's method. Meanwhile, Harper is deposed in the Liam Glasser trial but a previous threat she made to him threatens to derail Wesley's prosecution and he has to report her behavior to Internal Affairs. The father of one of Glasser's victims attacks Wesley at a fundraiser he is throwing and is subdued. The video circulates the internet, helping Wesley's campaign, but he still feels guilty. Tim and Lucy have problems with the Valentine's Day gifts they originally planned and try to find last-minute replacements while Celina feels guilty over Miles supposedly being cursed by her crystal supplier. Arnold attaches a rigged explosive to Lucy and Celina's shop and it explodes inside the station's garage, though no one is killed. Nolan gives Bailey his blessing to take the job in D.C., promising they can navigate a long-distance relationship.
133	7	"Baja"	Jon Huertas	Amanda Mercedes	February 16, 2026	807	N/A
After finding two dead women in a van, Lucy discovers that they were working for a drug cartel in Baja, Mexico. She and Harper convince Grey to allow them to run an undercover operation. While undercover, they are approached by Rafael "Rafa" Navarro, a lieutenant for the cartel, who recruits them for a mule job. After an exchange, Rafa blackmails them into making another run with more hardcore drugs. In the middle of the deal, they learn that Chase, a member of a rival cartel, killed the women. The team arrests Rafa, his associates, and Chase. Meanwhile, Nolan begins navigating his long-distance relationship with Bailey when he and Miles are assigned to watch the girlfriend of Hamster, a criminal. Hamster appears at the house but he flees and Miles loses him. Miles recruits Seth to go on an unauthorized stakeout. Hamster shows up and captures Miles. Seth calls Nolan for backup and he and Tim arrive as Seth rescues Miles. Miles is fired for going rogue but Nolan manages to convince Tim to instead give him a two-week suspension and a six-month extension in the FTO program, advising Miles to use the opportunity to get over his confidence issues.
134	8	"Grand Theft Aircraft"	Bill Roe	Nick Hurwitz	February 23, 2026	808	N/A
Nolan is assigned to help Garza supervise a prisoner transport flight from Vegas to L.A. Among the prisoners is Oscar and private military head Heath Everett. Thirty minutes in, the pilot drugs his partner and attempts to divert the plane to Bakersfield as Everett's people are holding his family hostage. Tim and Metro manage to rescue the family. However, Lucy and Celina learn that a marshal was bribed to facilitate Everett's escape. After the plane crashes, the prisoners escape. Nolan and Garza survive and the LAPD and FBI pursues the escapees. Nolan is forced to let Oscar escape to stop a cannibal. Everett and the other prisoners are apprehended. Tim receives a surprise visit from his mother, Joy, who is introduced to Lucy. Lucy is upset that Tim never mentioned her to Joy, who is likewise upset that Tim never told her that Lucy moved in. Joy tells Lucy that Tim has always strove to protect the people he cares about. Lucy advises Joy to have a heart-to-heart with Tim. Harper is put back on patrol. At home, Nolan receives a call from Oscar, who promises he is going to be more careful to avoid getting caught in the future.
135	9	"Fun and Games"	Stephanie Martin	Madeleine Coghlan	March 2, 2026	809	N/A
Miles and Harper are paired together, and she refuses advice from Nolan and Tim, instead opting to let Miles treat her as a rookie to test his knowledge. They intercept a getaway car with two bank robbers, both of whom have been shot. One dies in surgery but Harper and Miles are assigned by Lopez to interview the other to get leads on a third suspect. Nolan and Celina get called to the set of Game Changer for a reported robbery but find the cast unhelpful when taking witness statements. Nolan is reunited with Dash, the drone pilot who helped Harper find him after being kidnapped by Oscar, and he helps with the investigation. When Sam Reich accidentally texts Dash that he hired actors to play robbers as part of a stunt, Nolan discovers he accidentally hired real robbers. While dealing with a toxic couple that is part of a ghost gun ring, Grey finds evidence that Luna may have been fooling around with a doctor coworker. When he confronts her about it, she admits to having complicated feelings for the man, upsetting Grey. Lucy tries to get Tim to communicate with Joy more. Note: This episode is a crossover with the cast of Game Changer.
136	10	"His Name Was Martin"	Alexi Hawley	Alexi Hawley	March 9, 2026 July 20, 2026 (extended cut)	810	N/A
Nolan, Harper and Miles, along with Dash, get called for a wellness check for workers at Westview Psychiatric. They discover the workers got exposed to chemicals that turned them into "zombies". Due to signal trouble, they are forced to stay ahead of the mob until help can arrive. Lucy and Celina are sent to investigate when the others do not check in. Lucy gets separated from Celina and cornered by Martin, a worker. He attacks her and Lucy is forced to kill him in self-defense, leaving her severely traumatized. Wesley sits down for a deposition with Ryan Dearbourne, the mental patient who Glasser convinced to take credit for the murders, which initially goes well. However, Angela informs Wesley that Ryan had a psychotic episode and Wesley returns to his office to find Ryan attempting to harm himself. Wesley talks him down and he and Angela discover that someone dosed Ryan with amphetamines. They suspect Malcolm Walsh, Glasser's attorney, but Wesley cautions that they will need evidence to prove it. Grey, still struggling to deal with his issues with Luna, contacts Bailey to investigate a Pentagon office that has ties to Everett. Bailey finds a mysterious woman who begins investigating her. Note: On July 20, 2026, a 5-and-a-half-minute expanded version of this episode premiered on Hulu.
137	11	"Aftermath"	Tori Garrett	Chelsea Urech	March 16, 2026	811	N/A
Wesley is instructed by the D.A. to offer Liam Glasser a plea deal but even that becomes compromised when Harrison Novak comes forward to confess to Glasser's murders, leading Wesley, Angela and Nyla to suspect that Vivian is colluding with Malcolm to sabotage Wesley's campaign. Lucy is still dealing with trauma from killing Martin in self-defense and Tim advises her to take it easy, especially after Lucy is confronted by Martin's sister demanding answers for his death. Despite Tim advising against it, Lucy meets with the woman and tells her the truth. Lucy and Tim assist John and Celina in investigating a murder and they discover the victim was being tracked by Randy, who was hired by the matriarch of a notorious crime family seeking revenge for her granddaughter's death. John receives a warning from Zuzu, the rogue AI, that Bailey is being followed after her encounter with the mysterious woman at the Pentagon. Grey, John and Bailey set up a fake meet back in Los Angeles to try and draw out the people following her. Glasser is released from prison and Wesley, Angela and Nyla decide to redouble their efforts to bring him to justice.
138	12	"Spy Games"	Antonio Negret	Natalie Callaghan & Fatima Eldigair	March 23, 2026	812	N/A
John picks up Bailey at LAX and they along with Garza, Elena and the Mid-Wilshire crew, immediately launch into a sting operation to try and draw out Bailey's stalkers. The sting succeeds and they are able to identify the four stalkers and identify them as members of Everett's team working for a top DOD official, Brigadier General Adam Pressman. The Mid-Wilshire team learns from Zuzu that Pressman hired assassins to go after Everett's team. The police are able to bring the team in for protective custody. Wesley faces more heat in his campaign when Elijah Stone makes a public allegation that Wesley was having an affair with Monica while they were both in Elijah's employ. Wesley asks Monica to release a statement denying the affair. Zuzu contacts Angela to give her dirt on Vivian but decides not to use it. Wade and Luna begin mending fences, Bailey decides to move home and Zuzu is finally shut down.
139	13	"The Thinker"	Troian Bellisario	Moira Kirland & Aleks Biskis	March 30, 2026	813	N/A
After the Shangri-La officers (except Smitty) quit after winning the lottery, Tim, Lucy, Celina and Miles hold a recruitment drive which turns up two candidates. The first is a woman who wants to join to be close to her boyfriend, who is actually a criminal posing as a cop to rip off drug dealers with the help of a former LAPD captain, whom Angela and Nyla quickly arrest. The other candidate is Seth, hoping to earn his way back into the LAPD. Tim makes Seth take a polygraph, during which Seth's cover-up during the wildfire is revealed, disqualifying him. However, Tim and Lucy commend him for his honesty and he hits it off with the other applicant. On her first day back with LAFD, Bailey is assigned a rookie, Oakley, to train and asks John to ride along to give tips. However, they are abducted while trying to treat a gunshot victim by the criminals who shot him. Oakley gets shot but John and Bailey are able to incapacitate the crooks and save him. Luna and Grey agree to move back in together and Wesley loses the D.A. race, deciding to return to being a defense attorney.
140	14	"Tiger Bear"	Jennifer Lynch	Madeleine Coghlan & Jackson Deakins	April 6, 2026	814	N/A
Tim decides to take his leadership out on the streets. Celina starts temporary assignment with the detectives' bureau and chooses to work in Missing Persons. Despite discouragement from her supervisor, Detective Desmond, Celina digs deep to find a solvable case, eventually solving the disappearance of a young woman who lives in her building. Dash calls Nolan to report a dead body of one of his teachers. After solving the case, Dash is picked up by his deadbeat father and calls Nolan for help when criminals invade. Dash talks them into robbing his classmates and Nolan and Tim follow, arriving in time to rescue them. Sean Del Monte attempts to convince Wesley to stay at the D.A.'s office to counter Vivian's tough on crime approach. Vivian orders Wesley and Sean to get offenders to agree to plea deals on upgraded charges, but they both convince the various defense attorneys to take their chances at trial. They both end up quitting and decide to open a firm together.
141	15	"Survive the Streets"	Ashley Williams	Natalie Callaghan & Nick Hurwitz	April 13, 2026	815	N/A
In another true crime documentary, the Mid-Wilshire crew detail the case of Rich Rowley, a former LAPD officer who had seemingly died years prior in a boating accident, when Nolan and Celina find a crazed Rich after he stabbed himself. After finding the body of a murder victim in Rich's garage, Smitty recognizes a tattoo on the victim's arm from one of Rich's old training videos. This leads Lucy to find more clues tied to multiple cold cases hidden in Rich's videos. Rich believed the cases were tied to a dangerous cult that believed random citizens were being possessed by a demon called Malaphus. The case leads to the entertainment industry, even involving a meeting with Jensen Ackles and Jared Padalecki, before it is discovered that the murders were not motivated by demonic possession but were arranged by a B-movie horror director who was using the cult to eliminate his personal enemies.
142	16	"Out of Time"	John Terlesky	Moira Kirland & Amanda Mercedes	April 20, 2026	816	N/A
Someone tries to kill Liam Glasser and the Mid-Wilshire team is assigned to protect him. While John and Miles shadow him, Nyla tries to follow the trail of Glasser's attacker, a trail that eventually leads to the son of one of Glasser's victims. John is wounded in the ensuing shootout but survives. However, Glasser's ex-wife panics and runs away with their kids. Wesley and Del Monte start their new firm and are referred a client by Monica. Their new client, Ethan McAvoy, is suspected of killing a missing person that Angela is trying to find and the evidence points to him. Ethan reveals he was hired to throw a party and gain access to the victim's crypto wallet and Wesley and Del Monte realize he was set up to be a fall guy, agreeing to take his case. Tim is thinking about proposing to Lucy and Joy gives him his grandmother's ring to use, which everyone else advises he not use. He decides not to use the ring, and offers to let Joy consult when he picks out a ring for Lucy. Monica uses Grey and the task force to manipulate Aiden Warner into getting one last big payday.
143	17	"Dead Ringer"	Ryan Krayser	Alexi Hawley & Brynn Malone	April 27, 2026	817	N/A
Aaron is carjacked, also losing his expensive new watch. Tim and Lucy volunteer to help recover Aaron's property and Aaron pays them back by connecting Tim with his jeweler to find the perfect ring for Lucy. Celina volunteers to feel out what Lucy wants but her malfunctioning phone leads to misunderstandings with both Aaron and Rodge. John and Nyla are able to track down Miranda and convince her to return to court and face Glasser. John is unexpectedly called to testify and his testimony convinces the judge to deny Glasser custody. In revenge, Glasser leaves John with an ominous warning that he is responsible for what happens next. Aiden Warner tasks Monica with setting the task force on rival Cooper Johnson but Grey and Garza are already onto her. They are able to find Monica's leverage and issue a warrant for her arrest. Monica flees and briefly visits Wesley to say goodbye. As Monica is headed to the airport, the cab driver assassinates her.
144	18	"The Bandit"	Bill Roe	Alexi Hawley	May 4, 2026	818	N/A
The LAPD and FBI team up in order to move Heath Everett to a court hearing. Malcolm approaches Wesley with an offer to join Everett's legal team regarding minor crimes, which Wesley accepts, angering Tim. During the transport, Everett's mercenaries attack and retrieve him using a helicopter magnet. Tim loses his ring in the process, but Lopez later retrieves it and informs him that Wesley joined Everett's team to find dirt on Malcolm. The team traces Everett to a boat, which they raid. In the process, Everett is captured by Tim, while Nolan stays behind to hold off the mercenaries and manages to escape. Miles is horrified after a criminal he processed pulls out a gun and attempts to escape, until Harper informs him that the gun was a result of a night shift error. At a beach, Tim proposes to Lucy, and she accepts, but two passersby working for Everett drug and abduct them.
