= The Rookie series 7 =

Seventh series of The Rookie

The Rookie
- Series 7
- Starring: Nathan Fillion; Alyssa Diaz; Richard T. Jones; Melissa O'Neil; Eric Winter; Mekia Cox; Shawn Ashmore; Jenna Dewan; Lisseth Chavez
- No. of episodes: 18

Release
- Original release: January 7 – May 13, 2025

Series chronology
- ← Previous; Series 6 Next → Series 8

The seventh season of the American police procedural television series The Rookie premiered on ABC on January 7, 2025, and concluded on May 13, 2025.

The season consists of 18 episodes and continues the story of John Nolan (Nathan Fillion), and his fellow officers at the Los Angeles Police Department's Mid-Wilshire Division.

The series stars Nathan Fillion as John Nolan, alongside Alyssa Diaz, Richard T. Jones, Melissa O'Neil, Eric Winter, Mekia Cox, Shawn Ashmore, Jenna Dewan, and Lisseth Chavez.

The seventh season begins following the attack on John Nolan (Nathan Fillion), who is recovering from a gunshot wound sustained at the end of the previous season. Meanwhile, two dangerous criminals, Oscar Hutchinson and Jason Wyler, have escaped from prison, leaving Nolan and his colleagues determined to track them down.

The Mid-Wilshire Division welcomes two new police officers, Miles Penn (Deric Augustine) and Seth Ridley (Patrick Keleher). Miles is a transfer from Texas who has previous policing experience, while Seth is a new recruit who struggles with making quick decisions under pressure.

Tim Bradford (Eric Winter) becomes Miles' training officer, while Lucy Chen (Melissa O'Neil) is assigned to train Seth. Their new responsibilities bring additional challenges as they navigate their professional and personal relationships.

== Cast ==
- Nathan Fillion as John Nolan
- Alyssa Diaz as Angela Lopez
- Richard T. Jones as Wade Grey
- Melissa O'Neil as Lucy Chen
- Eric Winter as Tim Bradford
- Mekia Cox as Nyla Harper
- Shawn Ashmore as Wesley Evers
- Jenna Dewan as Bailey Nune
- Lisseth Chavez as Celina Juarez

=== Recurring ===
- Deric Augustine as Miles Penn
- Patrick Keleher as Seth Ridley

== Episodes ==
No. overall	No. in season	Title	Directed by	Written by	Original release date	Prod. code	U.S. viewers (millions)
109	1	"The Shot"	Alexi Hawley	Alexi Hawley	January 7, 2025	701	3.41
The LAPD and SWAT raid a house searching for Jason Wyler and Oscar Hutchinson but instead encounter four unrelated criminals, leading to a shootout and a foot pursuit involving Tim, Lucy, Celina and Nolan. While all four suspects are arrested, Jason and Oscar remain at large. Celina reveals that Aaron Thorsen transferred to another division due to Blair London's crimes. Lucy is temporarily promoted to P3 and begins training rookie Seth Ridley, while Tim trains rookie Miles Penn. Celina and Nolan witness a pharmacy robbery, but Nolan's failure to take a shot results in a civilian's death. Lucy and Tim make a bet over whose rookie would perform better. Seth later contaminates a crime scene by vomiting after discovering a pharmacy robber from earlier who had overdosed. However, he later reveals it was due to a memory of seeing his high school girlfriend overdose. Meanwhile, Miles's arrogance causes friction during training. The LAPD and FBI team up and cautiously pursue criminals transporting a nuclear device. The chase ends with Nolan successfully neutralizing a suspect, redeeming himself. Back home, Nolan reflects on the absence of Bailey who is out of the country due to the threat of Oscar and Jason. It is also revealed that Miles is homeless and living out of his car.
110	2	"The Watcher"	Bill Roe	Natalie Callaghan	January 14, 2025	702	3.45
Celina and Nolan pursue a suspect who was handcuffed by a masked vigilante known as "The Watcher". Celina begins her plainclothes day. Seth is late to roll call and tells Lucy that he's a cancer survivor and his tardiness was due to a doctor's appointment. Tim discovers Miles living in a car and warns him to find housing within 24 hours or face expulsion from the LAPD. Harper and Lopez temporarily return to patrol. Lucy and Seth encounter a man shot by the masked vigilante, but Seth fails to note key details, leading to a reprimand by Lieutenant Grey. Celina and Nolan respond to a home invasion where an elderly man accidentally and nonfatally shot his granddaughter, mistaking her for an intruder. There is tension between Celina and Nolan over leadership during Celina's plainclothes day. Harper, Lopez, Tim, and Miles devise a plan and capture the Watcher, only to discover that he is not the real shooter. The entire team converges on the shooter's house, where they apprehend the shooter and members of the "6th Street Devils" gang who stormed the property. Nolan later visits the traumatized grandfather in the hospital, and Miles moves in with Smitty in his RV.
111	3	"Out of Pocket"	Tessa Blake	Jenny Lynn	January 21, 2025	703	3.34
Nolan arms his house with a security system, anticipating a break-in from Jason. The alarm goes off because of a woman who accidentally wandered onto Nolan's property. Wesley listens to tapes from Blair's sessions, discovering that Detective Keith Graham has fantasies about Angela. Grey finds out that Tim and Lucy have been betting on their rookies, causing him to swap them. Rachel returns from New York after losing her job and moves in with Lucy. Nolan and Celina look for clues to find Jason. A suspect holds a woman hostage in her house. Miles and Seth, despite orders not to, go in and arrest the suspect. They are lauded as heroes on social media and avoid being fired due to the department trying to reform its image. Wesley, James, Harper, and Lopez have dinner together, which ends in a heated argument about the justice system. It is revealed that Jason is wanted dead by other criminals, but Nolan wants to arrest Jason as part of his morality; he spends the night following a hitman named Malvado, who plans to murder Jason. The rest of the team finds Nolan, but Malvado escapes. Bailey returns home early, much to Nolan's surprise.
112	4	"Darkness Falling"	John Hyams	Madeleine Coghlan	January 28, 2025	704	2.56
Celina and Bailey swap houses to confuse Jason, while Wesley returns to the D.A.'s office and confides in Del Monte about his discomfort with Graham's crush on Lopez. Seth reveals to Miles that his girlfriend died in a car crash, raising Lucy's suspicions. Nolan discovers a live body in a car trunk linked to Harrison Novak, a serial killer. The LAPD tracks and arrests Novak, taking custody of several bodies. Bailey realizes Malvado is following her, and questions him. He claims he is searching for Jason, giving her his untraceable number. During questioning, Novak insists that half of the bodies are not his, revealing that he has a copycat—someone he grew up with in a psychiatric ward. Lopez and Harper investigate the facility but find nothing. They notice a neighboring building with the same green tarp used to bury the victims. In the basement, Harper is injected with an unknown substance by the copycat, leaving her temporarily unable to feel her legs. Backup and LAPD officers arrive, securing the scene and rushing Harper to safety. Grey informs Nolan that Jason has been heading east. Bailey moves back in with Nolan but secretly keeps Malvado's number.
113	5	"Til Death"	Jennifer Lynch	Nick Hurwitz	February 4, 2025	705	2.55
Seth confesses to Lucy that the two stories he told were both lies, and that he will try not to lie anymore. Nolan and Celina apprehend Ryan Dearbourne, who is suspected to be the copycat, but Harper suspects vending machine supplier Liam Glasser, even when Ryan confesses. Harper later confirms Glasser's connection to the murders and lets him know that she will arrest him eventually. Bailey, meanwhile, calls Malvado and informs him about Jason. It is revealed that Jason paid someone to plant his fingerprints east, and the woman who wandered onto Nolan's property is Jason's partner. Jason kidnaps Bailey, but she fights back, forcing him and his partner to flee. Malvado and Nolan separately follow them, with Malvado shooting Jason's partner with a sniper rifle. As Nolan corners Jason, Malvado assassinates Jason and escapes. Lucy decides to remove Seth from the LAPD, but before she can speak to Grey, Seth reveals that his cancer has returned. Miles's long-distance girlfriend Camilla surprises him and moves to LA. Nolan visits Bailey in the hospital to take her home but discovers Malvado's burner phone and that Bailey texted him.
114	6	"The Gala"	Lanre Olabisi	Moira Kirland	February 11, 2025	706	2.77
On Valentine's Day, Tim and Lucy are partnered up in an event where people can report their exes for criminal behavior. A woman reports her ex, and Tim and Lucy arrest him. The man refuses to report his ex-girlfriend out of love. Meanwhile, Nolan and Celina investigate a case with a missing girl, learning that she was dating the daughter of a criminal and attempted to help her escape. However, the father of the missing girl confronts the criminal, resulting in the police saving the girls and arresting the criminal. At the charity gala, Lopez and Wesley set up Graham with one of Wesley's friends, while James introduces Harper to his friend, Anita, and her husband, Teddy. Teddy is revealed to be an abusive alcoholic and hits Anita. While breaking up the fight, Tim is injured. Lucy helps Tim dress his wound, and the two end up having sex but later agree not to do it again. Nolan privately confronts Bailey about Malvado, leading to an argument where Bailey breaks the burner phone and storms out angrily, refusing to talk to him. Camilla breaks up with Miles due to not feeling like she fits in with his new life.
115	7	"The Mickey"	Tara Miele	Amanda Mercedes	February 18, 2025	707	3.31
Tim and Miles respond to a call of a man trying to break into a women's shelter. Diana, a worker at the shelter, is injured in the scuffle and connects with Bailey, who tackled the man. Miles threatens the man and is reprimanded by Tim, but the two also share a positive connection when Miles reveals to Tim that he worked on a domestic violence case in Texas where the victim died, and Tim supports him emotionally. On Celina's final day as Nolan's rookie, their car gets stolen by the Hammer and his partner, Mickey Barnes, but both criminals are caught and decide to do a deal to rat out a higher-up criminal. Mickey betrays the deal by holding Tim hostage, but Hammer redeems himself by stopping Mickey. Lucy is hesitant to trust Seth due to his history of dishonesty. She allows him to be part of an undercover operation as Tamara's boyfriend, which nearly goes awry when Seth deviates from the plan. Seth and Tamara develop an interest in each other. Bailey confronts her past trauma, with help from Diana, and recognizes the extent of the psychological abuse she endured in her relationship with Jason.
116	8	"Wildfire"	Michael Goi	Brynn Malone	February 25, 2025	708	3.12
A wildfire breaks out in Los Angeles, creating chaos. Harper continues her pursuit of suspected serial killer Liam Glasser, watching him personally after official surveillance is reduced. As the Glasser family evacuates, she searches his home but finds nothing. Glasser uses the chaos to abduct a homeless man but is ultimately caught with help from his wife and son, who realize his guilt. Tim and Lucy become trapped in a fire due to Seth's failure to report a road closure. Taking shelter under a fireproof blanket, Tim confesses his love, and Lucy acknowledges her feelings but highlights the fact that Tim is her superior, and therefore, they cannot be in a relationship. Later, Lucy considers the sergeant's exam. Seth tries to cover up his mistake, but Tim and Lucy are suspicious. At a community shelter, James breaks up a dispute with a woman named Kylie, who unexpectedly kisses him. He reaffirms his commitment to Harper, unaware that Nolan is looking. Later, a Sixth Street Devils member hunting Kylie attacks the shelter in a drive-by shooting, gravely wounding both her and James.
117	9	"The Kiss"	Bill Roe	Elizabeth Davis Beall & Fredrick Kotto	March 11, 2025	709	3.29
Immediately following the shooting, Celina calls for an ambulance to take Kylie and James to the hospital. There, Nolan meets up with Bailey, who faints due to dehydration. The shooter is identified as a man named Connor, with Tim and Lucy attempting to pursue him, only for Connor to escape after striking a rich elderly woman with his car. The dying woman's maid and daughter fight over the woman's money, with Tim and Lucy having to stop the maid from stealing the woman's ring. Meanwhile, Wesley brings up the kiss between James and Kylie to Grey, resulting in a search of Harper's house, where they find a photo of James and a fugitive at the house. ADA Vivian, who has a grudge against Grey, interrogates Harper without his permission and threatens Grey into putting Harper on admin leave. Nolan manages to prove the fugitive's innocence by searching through the case files and arresting the real culprit. Later, he, Tim, and Lucy manage to arrest Connor. James wakes up and tells Harper everything, reaffirming his commitment to her, while Kylie is also expected to survive due to Celina's quick thinking. Bailey helps Celina arrest two men who robbed a meth lab.
118	10	"Chaos Agent"	Tasha Smith	Alexi Hawley	March 18, 2025	710	3.27
A typical day at Mid-Wilshire starts innocently enough with Miles being assigned to track and capture a raccoon in the station and with Celina assisting her new boyfriend Rodge in locating his stolen music equipment. Things soon turn hectic, though, with Nolan and Lucy investigating three teenage girls who were stabbed in a local park while the rest of the station has to deal with a group of inmates being housed at Mid-Wilshire while their prison deals with a riot, a situation that is complicated further by a computer system outage and, later, a power outage. Nolan and Lucy, assisted by Lopez and Wesley, soon learn that two of the girls were prompted into attacking the third girl, who was bullying them, by an advanced AI chatbot, which soon becomes fixated with Nolan. Meanwhile, Lucy suspects that Seth is lying about his cancer diagnosis, and Luna reveals his oncologist is a habitual disciplinary problem for the hospital. Lucy, Tim, and Grey later confront Seth and request a blood test to verify his cancer diagnosis. Seth refuses and is promptly fired, but not before threatening a lawsuit against the department.
119	11	"Speed"	Daryn Okada	Natalie Callaghan	March 25, 2025	711	3.72
Celina and Nolan go undercover as civilians on the bus as part of the LAPD's crackdown on transit crime. Celina is excited as this is her first undercover assignment. Things quickly take a turn when two brothers take the bus hostage with a bomb and demand access to a cryptowallet in government custody. One brother gets shot in a scuffle, leading to Nolan and Celina trying to convince the other brother to allow them to go to the hospital. When he refuses, SWAT gets Bailey on the bus to help. Eventually, Nolan is able to subdue the brother and save everyone on the bus. Meanwhile, Lopez and Harper go check out a house connected to the brothers only to find it booby trapped. When they run down leads on who may have set the trap, they tie it back to a woman who was posing as pregnant on the bus, and arrest her. Unbeknownst to them, the woman stole a government employee's secure data card for Monica Stevens, who is threatening her child's life in exchange for her silence. Miles has to raise $10,000 quickly to pay back his ex-girlfriend's father, and the only way to do so is to sell his college championship ring, which he does after a talk with Grey.
120	12	"April Fools"	Ryan Krayser	Amanda Mercedes	April 1, 2025	713	3.27
Lucy and Tim decide to use April Fool's Day as an excuse to hook up. Nolan is assigned a rookie, Connor Craig, who is one month away from completing the program but is underqualified. While on a domestic violence case involving Teddy and Anita, Connor gets injured and Nolan confronts Connor's previous T.O. The T.O. reveals that he put in very little effort training Connor. Wesley is assigned a case that is going to trial the next day and has to quickly decide what to do about it, and it raises Lopez's and Harper's suspicions. It is eventually revealed that the investigating detective is the one responsible for the murder. Tim clashes with the station's social media intern Livy, who makes several posts people mistake as real. When Tim notifies Livy that she has been fired, she retaliates by posting that all crime is legal for the next few hours, inciting a riot across the district which the LAPD is forced to stop, arresting Livy. Teddy is revealed to have been killed, and Connor safely retrieves evidence implicating Anita in the crime. Grey allows Connor to stay in the program but has him transferred to a quieter division.
121	13	"Three Billboards"	Gina Lamar	Aleks Biskis & Chelsea Urech	April 8, 2025	712	3.21
Nolan and Bailey are trying to adopt a baby, but Nolan spots a billboard accusing him as a dirty cop. On patrol, Lucy and Nolan stop a car with expired plates but witness a bombing. When Celina arrives at the suspected bomber's house, she enters the house, and sees someone getting tortured, but the suspect flees. Nolan and Lucy arrive to support Celina, but are unable to help when they have to take cover from another bombing. The victim reveals to Lopez and Harper that the bomber killed his accomplice when he refused to rob a celebrity's home. Miles meets a childhood friend who is a famous football player and attends his party, but notices his friend's assistant steal valuables. He also spots Rachel, Lucy's friend, and gets caught up in a gunfight. Lucy, Celina and Rodge arrive to assist Miles. Further posters are seen accusing Nolan, Harper and Lopez of being dirty. Nolan and Bailey meet with the social worker, who indicates that adoption is unlikely. It is revealed that Liam Glasser was responsible for the billboards. Nolan and Bailey decide to mentor children at James' community center.
122	14	"Mad About Murder"	Dinh Thai	Madeleine Coghlan	April 15, 2025	714	2.97
While pulling traffic cams, Nolan identifies a civilian as Malvado. The FBI reveals that they have linked the murders to a hitman site and they have arrested a couple connected to it. The boyfriend quickly breaks and reveals that it is a scam. Nolan reveals to Bailey that Malvado is back and she fears that if he was caught that he would try to use her contact with him as a form of leverage. LAPD and the FBI go to a golf course, anticipating that Malvado would attempt to go after Mitch Yancy, a wealthy client. They arrest Mitch and find Malvado on a roof of a country club. He flees and is chased by Nolan and Tim, overpowering both officers until he is confronted by Lopez. He tries to shoot her with a hidden gun but she shoots him dead. Meanwhile, Celina and Lucy investigate a missing woman and her baby, discovering that she was kidnapped by a deranged woman, and manage to save both her and the baby. Tim agrees to help Miles record new training videos in exchange for the latter helping the LAPD win the flag football game against the LAFD.
123	15	"A Deadly Secret"	Ashley Williams	Nick Hurwitz	April 22, 2025	715	2.83
In another documentary, the Mid-Wilshire officers and their friends and family recount the tale of Henry's ex-fiancee Abigail as she goes missing investigating the case of the Westview Psychiatric Hospital. Despite numerous people, including Shane Madej and Ryan Bergara, attempting to prove the abandoned facility is haunted, Nolan and Celina instead discover a vast criminal conspiracy involving mind altering drugs and wealthy patients. They also discover an unharmed Abigail, who had been trapped in the facility when she fell through the floor, and she provides further insight on the case while trying to produce her own documentary on the facility. It is revealed that the hospital director is the one responsible for the crimes, and the LAPD arrest her, with Abigail able to successfully finish her documentary. Meanwhile, during their investigation of the facility, Tim and Lucy are accidentally dosed with truth serum and have an honest conversation about their breakup and Lucy lets slip that she has forgiven Tim.
124	16	"The Return"	John Terlesky	Moira Kirland	April 29, 2025	716	2.84
Seth Ridley successfully sues to get reinstated to the FTO program but is shunned by his fellow officers, particularly Lucy and Miles. Nolan is assigned as his new T.O. and they get called to a silent alarm where a civilian talks down the robber. However, that civilian is revealed to have been released erroneously from a Nevada prison with five years remaining on his sentence. When Nolan and Seth arrive to take him into custody, he runs. Meanwhile, Tim and Miles arrest a social media influencer who was livestreaming his reckless driving. He uses his internet fame to turn his followers against Wesley and Angela. Angela and Nyla confront the influencer's girlfriend, who leaks a video of him insulting his most loyal fans. When Nolan and Seth follow the civilian's wife to two known criminals, the latter gets shot in the leg while saving the former. Seth's leg is amputated and Nolan advises he take the opportunity to become a better person. The civilian is later cleared of charges and set free. Seth comes clean to Tamara about his lies and she breaks up with him. Lucy finally takes her sergeant's exam, so she and Tim contemplate what's next for them if she passes.
125	17	"Mutiny and the Bounty"	Rob Seidenglanz	Brynn Malone	May 6, 2025	717	3.11
Skip Tracer Randy turns up at John Nolan's house and reveals that he has gotten rich off crypto. He wants to use that newfound wealth to marry Pete Nolan's girlfriend, Chastity. When Randy proposes, she turns him down but allows him to be her sugar daddy. However, criminals kidnap Chastity, demanding a ransom. Randy accidentally makes the situation worse by paying the initial ransom and making an announcement to have vigilantes arrest the criminals. Chastity escapes, and Nolan and the others arrest the criminals. Randy accidentally forgets his crypto wallet password, but remains on good terms with Chastity. Meanwhile, Angela and Nyla help their mothers catch a woman who has frauded other women out of their houses. Also, while on a case, Wesley learns that Sean Del Monte's son has been involved with drug dealers. Wesley convinces Sean to stand up and put his son in rehab, but criminals attack. Sean holds off the criminals long enough for the LAPD to arrive, and later informs Wesley that he will be dropping out of the DA race. Lucy learns that she had the highest score in the sergeant's exam, but is being transferred to night shift due to her promotion.
126	18	"The Good, the Bad, and the Oscar"	Bill Roe	Alexi Hawley	May 13, 2025	718	3.02
Lucy starts her new job as the supervising sergeant in the night shift and has trouble adjusting. Miles includes his profession as part of his dating app profile. He goes out with a girl who is the sister of a gang member. He evades the criminals and is saved by Lucy. Angela deals with a man who robbed a bank in order to give money to an AI-generated woman he met online. It is revealed the man's wife is trying to catfish him. Nolan and Harper track Oscar to a motel. Oscar spots Nolan, abducts him, and forces him to help find diamonds a fellow prisoner hid. Harper enlists the help of a boy with a drone to find Nolan. The drone interrupts Oscar before he can kill Nolan. Nolan fights Oscar, but the latter escapes empty-handed via a helicopter. Tim comes to Lucy's house to make her breakfast and ask her to move in with him; Lucy falls asleep and misses his speech. Garza reveals that someone stole classified NSA documents, using them as leverage to get immunity. That person happens to be Monica, who walks by the team as a free woman, much to everyone's dismay.
