= The Rookie series 6 =

Sixth series of The Rookie

The Rookie
- Series 6
- Starring: Nathan Fillion; Alyssa Diaz; Richard T. Jones; Tru Valentino; Melissa O'Neil; Eric Winter; Mekia Cox; Shawn Ashmore; Jenna Dewan; Lisseth Chavez
- No. of episodes: 10

Release
- Original release: February 20 – May 21, 2024

Series chronology
- ← Previous; Series 5 Next → Series 7

The sixth season of the American police procedural television series The Rookie premiered on ABC on February 20, 2024, and concluded on May 21, 2024.

The season consists of 10 episodes and continues the story of John Nolan (Nathan Fillion), and his fellow officers at the Los Angeles Police Department's Mid-Wilshire Division.

The series stars Nathan Fillion as John Nolan, alongside Alyssa Diaz, Richard T. Jones, Melissa O'Neil, Eric Winter, Mekia Cox, Shawn Ashmore, Jenna Dewan, Tru Valentino, and Lisseth Chavez.

The sixth season begins in the aftermath of the attack on the Mid-Wilshire Division at the end of the fifth season. John Nolan and his colleagues investigate the reasons behind the attack and discover that the assault was part of a larger criminal operation.

Meanwhile, Lucy Chen (Melissa O'Neil) continues working towards becoming a detective and faces challenges in her relationship with Tim Bradford (Eric Winter). Their relationship is put under considerable pressure when Tim's past returns, eventually leading to their separation.

Elsewhere, Celina Juarez (Lisseth Chavez) continues developing as a police officer under Nolan's guidance. Aaron Thorsen (Tru Valentino) returns to duty following the injuries he sustained in the previous season.

== Cast ==
- Nathan Fillion as John Nolan
- Alyssa Diaz as Angela Lopez
- Richard T. Jones as Wade Grey
- Tru Valentino as Aaron Thorsen
- Melissa O'Neil as Lucy Chen
- Eric Winter as Tim Bradford
- Mekia Cox as Nyla Harper
- Shawn Ashmore as Wesley Evers
- Jenna Dewan as Bailey Nune
- Lisseth Chavez as Celina Juarez

== Episodes ==
No. overall	No. in season	Title	Directed by	Written by	Original release date	Prod. code	U.S. viewers (millions)
99	1	"Strike Back"	Bill Roe	Alexi Hawley	February 20, 2024	601	3.77
Following Moran's death, the Mid-Wilshire officers learn that his attack was a diversion for a professional crew to rob the Federal Reserve Bank. Nolan and the others arrive at the bank and a shootout ensues, forcing the criminals to sacrifice three of their own to stall for time to escape. Six weeks later, one of the surviving thieves is hospitalized following a car crash and is killed while attempting to murder a nurse. A search of his rental house turns up a phone which leads them to the remaining crew, all of whom are arrested after a shootout at the airport. Lucy is studying for her detective exam and asks Tim to challenge her with outside the box tests. She makes a mistake that compromises evidence in a murder. Her self-doubt causes her to question Tim's motives. Aaron returns to duty following his shooting and is assigned to desk duty until the department psychiatrist, Dr. Blair London, signs off on him. Boyd, the leader of the crew, takes a deal with defense attorney Monica Stevens following his interrogation but is killed by a sniper (implied to have been sent by Monica) while en route to jail.
100	2	"The Hammer"	Alexi Hawley	Alexi Hawley & Brynn Malone	February 27, 2024	602	3.29
Nolan and Bailey's wedding day is just one day away, but first must contend with a seemingly endless stream of disasters, including a lawsuit against Nolan by Oscar Hutchinson. Skip Tracer Randy accidentally pawns Bailey's ring, and Tim and Lucy go to retrieve it from a known criminal called "The Hammer", who has a penchant for fighting. The two also take time to address their own fight over Lucy becoming an undercover detective, which Tim discovers he has more reservations over than he thought. Celina and Harper discover a heroin smuggling ring disguised as a pottery dealer and Celina uses it to try and land her first case. Grey ends up officiating when the minister gets stuck in traffic and the ceremony goes off well, with Randy filling in as DJ. Tim and Lucy agree to work through their issues, but Aaron is gently rebuffed when he tries to kiss Celina and gets drunk as a result. Celina goes to meet an informant and is kidnapped leading the rest of the team to come to her rescue.
101	3	"Trouble in Paradise"	TK Shom	Madeleine Coghlan & Glen Mazzara	March 5, 2024	603	3.49
Nolan and Bailey's secluded getaway honeymoon turns into an active crime scene when their housekeeper washes up dead on the beach. They suspect a bandaged loner also staying at the resort of being the killer and all efforts to escape and get help prove fruitless before they are abducted. Harper and Lopez join them as backup and use footage from Nolan's cameras to track them down, arriving just as he escapes and subdues the suspect. Celina is assigned to Tim in Nolan's absence while she also struggling with Aaron's kiss, and he struggles with his own feelings. Lucy continues to prepare for the detectives' exam and Tim cautions her about overpreparing. They and Celina soon get caught up trying to identify an amnesiac shoplifter. Lucy takes her detectives' exam, while Tim and Celina follow a lead and find the shoplifter's partner stuck in a wall, having got stuck during an attempted heist. Aaron and Celina mend their friendship and Lucy passes her exam but ranks low. Nolan and Bailey salvage their honeymoon by having a relaxing staycation back at home.
102	4	"Training Day"	Tori Garrett	Fredrick Kotto & Natalie Callaghan	March 26, 2024	604	3.06
Aaron is cleared to return to duty and undergoes tests with Tim to see if he can still overcome the workload. Aaron decides to be more thorough in the case they are given but is frustrated when it comes to an unexpected end, with the husband of a woman supplying a criminal with money, ends up dead in prison. Furthermore, the wife is revealed to have ordered his death due to his history of abuse. Nolan and Celina respond to a dead body discovery, which they soon learn could be another victim of the long-lost Pentagram killer. The case takes a turn when they learn that the victim was disliked at her school, and a man escapes after witnessing his wife being killed at his home. The victim's brother is revealed to be responsible when he shoots up the recovery scene, and Lucy is injured. Despite this she faces the brother solo, who she later learns survived his injuries, meaning that she will potentially be witnessing against him.
103	5	"The Vow"	C. Chi-Yoon Chung	Vincent Angell & Diana Mendez Boucher	April 2, 2024	605	3.40
Tim calls off a date night with Lucy, to meet a former army friend, Mark Greer, to discuss plans to eliminate Ray Watkins, who once betrayed them in the past. But he finds himself unable to go through with the mission after confronting Ray, deciding to take all the heat if Ray ever strikes back, with Mark ditching the plan shortly after. Nolan and Celina respond to a murder of a family, with only a mother and her toddler daughter surviving. However, the mother later dies in hospital and Nolan suggests he and Bailey could take care of the toddler until either relatives or a foster family is found. Bailey worries about taking care of the toddler due to past trauma looking after a neighbor's child. Harper and Lopez lead the investigation into the family's death and learn from their tenant that a coworker of the father became vengeful over a lottery ticket. A shootout ensues at the coworker's residence before a swift arrest. Meanwhile, Aaron encounters Blair at a bar, and she takes an apparent liking to him, but later denies it at a meeting. Nolan and Bailey decide to adopt the family's toddler, but are disappointed when her uncle arrives to take care of her instead.
104	6	"Secrets and Lies"	Bill Roe	Elizabeth Davis Beall & Leland Jay Anderson	April 9, 2024	606	3.31
Lopez inquiries into the nature of Tim's secrecy after learning about Lucy's worries. Eventually Tim comes clean to them after Ray visits Lucy's home. The trio determine that he is a gun for hire just as he abducts a Venezuelan activist, which they manage to stop, and an IA investigation is launched. The investigation, during which Tim lies to Percy West, the late Jackson West's father, clears him of any wrongdoing against Ray, but internal ramifications await. Additionally, Tim decides to break up with Lucy. Nolan and Celina track an escaped inmate from a community event, learning that she sought retaliation against whoever cheated with her boyfriend, surprisingly revealed to be her own mother. A bag from the same event leads Harper and Aaron to reopen the investigation into Karina Lewis' murder, which they gradually determine had a false confession and murder weapon. After pinpointing the gun's make, model, residue and owner, ADA Del Monte reverses the original verdict in favor of the new evidence. Bailey is more determined to have a baby, but Nolan is hesitant, citing his old age and work schedule, but eventually decides in favor of having another baby.
105	7	"Crushed"	Tori Garrett	Brynn Malone & Natalie Callaghan	April 30, 2024	607	3.72
Tim is demoted and placed back on patrol. He also receives a psychological evaluation from Blair, who concludes that he still is fit for duty. Meanwhile, Nolan and Celina track down a man who had an affair with his babysitter. They and the others later learn that the babysitter's friend also was kidnapped alongside her, but later find her dead in a parking garage. The babysitter later manages to escape, and they find the man dead in his car. En route to the hospital, the babysitter escapes and wields a knife at police. She reveals that she is pregnant and had killed the man when he broke things off and abused her, as well as her friend when she wanted to call the police about the murder. Tim decides to go to therapy despite Blair's positive conclusion. As Tamara moves out, Celina asks Lucy if she can become her new roommate, which she accepts. Harper and Lopez share babysitter advice and vet a new babysitter, which they ultimately decide to share, with her taking care of both of their children when required.
106	8	"Punch Card"	Lanre Olabisi	Vincent Angell & Fredrick Kotto	May 7, 2024	608	2.87
Tim and Aaron are placed on watch duty for a Metro raid. Meanwhile, the LAPD has to handle a massive gang war between the Eastern Front and a rival gang that finds its way to the hospital. After repeatedly intervening to help, Nolan and Bailey eventually get to their doctor's appointment and learn that she can't bear children. Although IVF is suggested as a solution, Bailey decides against it. The SWAT raid is compromised and an officer is left paralyzed. Tim suspects "Mad Dog", the leader of the Metro team, is a mole and confronts him on a rooftop. Mad Dog confesses to his suspicions and commits suicide, but not before giving Tim a tiny hint. Celina moves in with Lucy, and shortly afterwards receives a birthday card from Tim. Monica Stevens is assaulted by a professional hitman in her home. The hitman is killed by Monica in the hospital, and it is also implied that Monica is working with Blair and Mad Dog. Meanwhile, Harper and Lopez both suspect Monica in the hitman's death, which they currently cannot prove.
107	9	"The Squeeze"	Michael Goi	Diana Mendez Boucher & Leland Jay Anderson	May 14, 2024	609	2.98
IA investigates the suspicious circumstances surrounding Mad Dog's death, but Tim finds himself being tainted by the IA investigator Pearson, who it is implied has a vendetta against him and is later revealed to be working for Blair. Nolan and Celina secretly investigate Blair and later turn to Smitty, asking him to keep an eye on her comings and goings and her patients. Monica investigates who might be looking to kill her, which leads her to the city's money laundering top criminal, Christian Batista. Concurrently, Lucy goes undercover as a new babysitter at the Batista home after Harper and Lopez learn that their babysitter formerly worked for Christian, and his enforcer shows up at Lopez's home. Nolan confronts Blair with evidence from Mad Dog's flat that implicates her, and she eventually agrees to testify in exchange for immunity. A lead from a computer search leads Grey, Harper and Lopez to proof that Pearson was in on the conspiracy. Monica tracks down her attackers and learns that they were hired by Eric Ramsey. In exchange for assistance against Ramsey, she agrees to help Oscar Hutchinson escape prison.
108	10	"Escape Plan"	Bill Roe	Alexi Hawley	May 21, 2024	610	3.14
Nolan and Harper team up with Garza and his FBI team to uncover the conspiracy. Monica's hit crew starts killing any witnesses against her, which includes Pearson, before later capturing Blair. Christian's men attempt to kill the hired gun Gundo after he double-crosses Monica and she tips Christian off, but are thwarted by Tim, Lucy, and Lopez. Monica makes plans of her own for revenge against Ramsey, in which, after confronting him, she resorts to blackmail against him over an affair he had with the wife of Swiss businessman Jakob Olmstead. She takes Blair to Argentina, and reveals her plans to reel Jakob over to her side against Ramsey. Nolan and Harper rescue Blair in Argentina with the assistance of the CIA and FBI, but Nolan is injured during the rescue, which allows Monica to escape. Garza ensures that an Interpol warrant is placed on Monica. Tim apologizes to Lucy, lets her know he will always hold her kindness and repay as much as he can. Oscar and Jason Wyler, Bailey's psychologically abusive ex-husband, break out of prison. Grey contacts Nolan while he and Bailey are talking about adoption, letting them know that Oscar and Jason have escaped.
