= Czech Mate (The Rookie) =

- The Rookie episode
- Episode no.: Season 8 Episode 1
- Directed by: Bill Roe
- Written by: Alexi Hawley
- Original air date: January 6, 2026
- Running time: 43 mins

Guest appearances
- Felix Solis as Matthew Garza; Bridget Regan as Monica Stevens; Angel Parker as Luna Grey; Brent Huff as Quigley Smitty; Jon Øigarden as Lucas Wegner

Episode chronology
← Previous "The Good, the Bad, and the Oscar"	Next → "Fast Andy"

"Czech Mate" is an episode of American TV series The Rookie. It is the first episode of the eighth season of the show and first aired on January 6, 2026. This episode centers around members of the team travelling to Prague to take down a weapons trafficker. The episode received generally positive reviews though some criticism over the direction of the storyline involving Monica Stevens and her villainy. Other moments in the episode featured the reunion of the "Chenford" relationship.

== Premise ==
In Prague, John Nolan (Nathan Fillion), Bailey Nune (Jenna Dewan) and Monica Stevens (Bridget Regan) arrive at a hotel while Matthew Garza (Felix Solis) and Nyla Harper (Mekia Cox) brief local authorities on the plans for Stevens to assist them in taking down a weapons dealer named Lukas Wegner (Jon Øigarden) while simultaneous raids are planned for Wagner's operations in Los Angeles, London and Berlin. Bailey tries convincing John into trying to extend their time in Prague to make it a second honeymoon. (Note: First honeymoon as seen in "Trouble in Paradise") Meanwhile in Los Angeles, Lucy Chen (Melissa O'Neil) comes home from nightshift and talks about her shift with Celina Juarez (Lisseth Chavez) who then enquires about Lucy's potential relationship with Tim Bradford (Eric Winter). While Tim is also discussing it with Angela Lopez (Alyssa Diaz) before going to update the task force alongside Wade Grey (Richard T. Jones), Quigley Smitty (Brent Huff) and Miles Penn (Deric Augustine). Smitty then informs Penn about the parking lot they live in beside the police station is starting a HOA.

The police in Los Angeles, go to the port of Los Angeles to stake it out and find a member of Wegner's crew who they plan to apprehend but he rams a car upon realizing the police are after him and ends up crashing his car and getting injured. Wade follows him to hospital to get answers despite protests from the doctors and his wife Luna (Angel Parker) who is a patient advocate. Luna is angry with Wade for what he done to get information. Wade gives the information to his officers and requests Lopez to get her husband Wesley Evers (Shawn Ashmore) who is also an Assistant District Attorney to tag along to make sure everything done is above board for if it goes to court.

In Prague, Monica tries to escape the hotel room but is caught by Bailey. Monica admits that she wants to go out and see Prague, Bailey suggests that they go with Monica where she requests John get a new outfit to appear as her bodyguard. While walking in Prague, Nolan asks how Monica got the information she leveraged the government to make an immunity deal with and she reveals she was behind a hostage situation on a bus which John was on. (Note: As seen in "Speed") While on the walk Nolan notices that they are being followed by someone who they apprehend and take back to the hotel for Nyla and Garza to investigate. Wegner phones Monica and informs her that he has the items she wants where he sets the location and time for the meeting while Nyla alerts the other locations to prepare for the raids.

Lucy comes after her nightshift to assist the other officers in the raid when she is set up to speak with Tim about their relationship and they agree to give it another go and for her to move into his house.

In Prague, the operation goes down successfully and Wegner is arrested and Monica makes another attempt at escape where she is found in a church by Nolan and Bailey where she was getting items that a courier got from a safety deposit box for her and they learn that the man who was following them was sent by Jakob Olmstead in retaliation for bringing the FBI to his door. (Note: As seen in "Escape Plan") During a shootout, Bailey and Nolan manage to protect Monica. Back in LA, the raid at the port is successful.

On the plane back to America, Garza gives Monica a single necklace as it's the only thing from the bag the courier brought that they can verify she bought with clean money and he mentions it's apprised at around 100 grand. He then offers Nyla a spot on the task force to which she declines. Celina offers Miles, Lucy's old room to which he accepts, and Wade accepts a place on the task force.

It's then shown that Nolan and Bailey stayed in Prague and standing on a bridge, Nolan gets annoyed and frustrated that a busker is singing "Daddy Cop".

== Production and Development ==
It was revealed that The Rookie was going to be filming in Prague for the eighth season premiere episode via behind the scenes clips posted by Jenna Dewan on her Instagram. It was also shown from the clips that Nathan Fillion and Mekia Cox was also on location filming for the episode.

In an interview with PureWow, Dewan said to Danielle Long "It felt like a film... The locations were gorgeous, and the action scenes were major." She also added "I do think The Rookie fans will be so happily fulfilled when they see this first episode because it's different for us and it's bigger for us".

Jeffrey Harris notes that while the show has featured characters going to international locations in the past, such as Guatemala in season 4 it was all filmed in Malibu as reported in Collider. And theorised that the season 6 scenes in Argentina was not shot there but likely somewhere in Southern California.

During the filming of the episode, Fillion revealed that Bridget Regan had to be briefly hospitalised due to food poisoning.

This episode was also the first episode in which Deric Augustine appeared as a main cast member.

== Reception ==
Raquel Morales of Fangirlish reviewed the Tim and Lucy scenes by saying "a part of me thinks this was a rushed conversation and that Chenford still has some tough conversations to have. Lucy herself admitted to Tim that her scars weren't fully healed yet. So we think they'll have all those difficult conversations throughout the season, as obstacles arise for them, and we hope we can see them truly communicate" She also added in a note about the episode "The only aspect of The Rookie Season 8 Episode 1 "Czech Mate" that we didn't like was what they did to Grey and Luna. They are precious, and we're not going to forgive them for messing with them."

A reviewer for TheTVCave said in their review "The Rookie returned last night and I hope I'm not jumping the gun here, but this just may be their best season yet. From the moment the episode began, I was locked in and admittedly I haven't been able to say that for quite some time."

Jeffrey Harris from Collider highlighted that the show needed to move on from the Monica Stevens storyline by saying "Although it was a great, entertaining episode, Monica received a rather anticlimactic ending, so it's time to showcase why it's time for The Rookie to move on from Monica as the show's main villain." He also added, "Ultimately, Monica being mostly cooperative this week, with very few hitches, came off as frustrating because it came off like a half-hearted attempt to bleach the character of her past offenses."

Jasmine Blu of TVFanatic, gave the episode a positive review highlighting the season premiere was "highly anticipated" She also added "Not only is it good to have the series back, but it's better to have it in top form, proving that eight years in, The Rookie can still bring it home as one of the best shows that broadcast has to offer. And for the most part, The Rookie Season 8 Episode 1 offered intrigue, strong dynamics, romance, and some intriguing conflict and new opportunities. All of the above made up for the Bailey, Rodge, and Monica of it all." Though Blu also highlighted some dissatisfaction over Monica's villainy storyline by saying "Has the Monica situation gotten old? Yes. And your girl has talked ad-nauseum about that, so there's no need to beat that dead horse here, lest I risk becoming a hypocrite for not letting Monica go. But, overall, even Monica had her endearing moments and her placement in all of this. Maybe it's just the general high of having a beloved series back on the air after such a long break, but The Rookie treating Monica like its pet villain who'll never fully be tamed had its amusing moments." But did add in a positive note "And dare I say it even has some potential because the very idea that Monica would have to slum it like "a poor" by trying to live in LA and sustain herself with the $100K she may or may not cash in from that necklace is admittedly hilarious."
