= Czech Mate =

Czech Mate may refer to:

- "Czech Mate", The Real Housewives of Cheshire series 6, episode 63 (2017)
- "Czech Mate", The Rookie season 8, episode 1 (2026)
