= Patrick Keleher =

American actor and filmmaker (born 2002)

- Born: August 1, 2002 (age 24); Carbondale, Colorado, United States
- Education: Full Sail University
- Occupations: Actor, screenwriter, film director

Patrick Keleher (born August 1, 2002) is an American actor, screenwriter, and film director. He is best known for portraying Seth Ridley, a recurring character on the ABC police procedural television series The Rookie (2025–2026). Keleher also appeared as Mateo Garcia on the CBS military police procedural series NCIS in 2026. He starred as Jackson, a lead character in the docudrama play Fatherland, written and directed Stephen Sachs, and performed at the New York City Center. Keleher also wrote and directs the upcoming indie coming-of-age comedy drama film Frick!, in which he also stars as the lead character, Noah.

== Biography ==
Patrick Keleher was born on August 1, 2002 in the town of Carbondale in Colorado, United States, where he grew up. Growing up he performed in local theatres and created short films. He finished the Roaring Fork High School in Carbondale, and in 2023, he graduated from the Full Sail University in Winter Park, Florida. Keleher also spent time living in Paraguay and traveling across the United States and Africa.

In 2024, Keleher portrayed Jackson, a lead character in the docudrama play Fatherland, written and directed Stephen Sachs, and performed at the New York City Center. In 2025, he was nominated for his performance for the Drama Desk Award for Outstanding Lead Performance in a Play. Keleher moved to Los Angeles, California in 2024.

From 2025, Keleher has portrayed Seth Ridley, a recurring character on the ABC police procedural television series The Rookie. In 2026, he also appeared on the CBS military police procedural series NCIS, portraying Mateo Garcia.

Keleher also wrote and directs the upcoming indie coming-of-age comedy drama film Frick!, in which he also stars as the lead character, Noah. It was based on his previous short film, which he released in 2023.

== Personal life ==
Keleher resides in Los Angeles in California, United States.

== Filmography ==
=== Film ===
Year	Title	Role	Notes
2022	A $1.00 Friendship	Blind person	Short film; also director and writer
2022	Disconnect	Eli	Short film
2022	Dog Tags	Parker	Short film
2022	Nuggets	Wayne	Short film
2022	Saucy	Addict	Short film
2022	Soldering Doesn't Fix It	Joseph	Short film
2022	Reincarnation	Ryan Harris	Short film
2022	'Til Death Do Us Part	Tim	Short film
2022	Zombies in the Antique Shop	No data	Short film
2023	The Creature Under the Bed	Chance	Short film
2023	Committed	Brennan	Short film
2023	The Culinary Crossroads	—N/a	Short film; director and writer
2023	Ding Ding	Pizza delivery person	Short film
2023	Dr. Alan Venture Man	Dr. Alan Venture	Short film
2023	Dream Slasher	Police dispatcher	Short film
2023	Frick!	Frickbird	Short film; also director and writer
2023	Gray Noise	Paul	Short film
2023	Marianas	Walter	Short film
2023	Peril in Disguise	Chase	Short film
2023	The Therapy Session	Guitar player	Short film
2023	Where Are the Strawberry Fields?	Dani	Short film
2024	Axes and Os	Mark	Feature film
2024	Barbenheimer and the Cult of Walt Disney	Patrick	Feature film
2024	Buy My Camera	—N/a	Short film; director and writer
2026	Stagehand	No data	Short film
2026	Valentines Lake	Mark	Feature film
TBA	Frick!	Noah	Upcoming feature film; also writer and director

=== Television ===
Year	Title	Role	Notes
2022	The Egos	Patrick	Episode: "The Cult of Walt Disney"
2022	The Egos	Russian criminal	Episode: "Russia Takes Reedy Creek"
2022	The Egos	Erick	Episode: "Behind Closed Stalls"
2022	The Egos	Evan	Episode: "Lego Land Training"
2022	The Egos	Patrick	Episode: "Bad Parent Stories At The House of Blues"
2025–2026	The Rookie	Seth Ridley	Recurring role; 12 episodes
2026	NCIS	Mateo Garcia	2 episodes

== Theater credits ==
Year	Title	Role	Venue	Director	Ref.
2024	Fatherland	Jackson	New York City Center (New York City)	Stephen Sachs	

== Accolades and nominations ==
Awards and nominations received by Patrick Keleher
Award	Year	Category	Nominated work	Result	Ref.
Drama Desk Awards	2025	Outstanding Lead Performance in a Play	Fatherland	Nominated	
