= The Rookie =

American television series (2018–present)

- Genre: Police procedural; Crime drama; Action
- Created by: Alexi Hawley
- Starring: Nathan Fillion; Alyssa Diaz; Richard T. Jones; Titus Makin Jr.; Mercedes Mason; Melissa O'Neil; Afton Williamson; Eric Winter; Mekia Cox; Shawn Ashmore; Jenna Dewan; Tru Valentino; Lisseth Chavez; Deric Augustine
- Opening theme: "Kings & Queens" by ChinChin
- Composer: Jordan Gagne
- Country of origin: United States
- Original language: English
- No. of seasons: 8
- No. of episodes: 144 (list of episodes)

Production
- Executive producers: Alexi Hawley; Nathan Fillion; Mark Gordon; Nicholas Pepper; Michelle Chapman; Jon Steinberg; Liz Friedlander; William Norcross; Terence Paul Winter
- Producers: Michele Greco; Patrick Mckee; Marco Black; Helen Pai; Diana Mendez Boucher
- Production location: Los Angeles, California
- Cinematography: Doug Emmett
- Editors: C. Chi-Yoon Chung; Emily E. Greene
- Running time: 42–45 minutes
- Production companies: Entertainment One (seasons 1–5); Lionsgate Television (season 6–present); Perfectman Pictures; ABC Signature (seasons 1–6) (Note: Credited as ABC Studios for seasons 1–2); 20th Television (season 7–present)

Original release
- Network: ABC
- Release: October 16, 2018 – present

Related
- The Rookie: Feds; The Rookie: North

The Rookie is an American police procedural television series created by Alexi Hawley for ABC. The series stars Nathan Fillion, Alyssa Diaz, Richard T. Jones, Titus Makin Jr., Mercedes Mason, Melissa O'Neil, Eric Winter, Afton Williamson, Mekia Cox, Shawn Ashmore, Jenna Dewan, Tru Valentino, Lisseth Chavez, and Deric Augustine. It follows John Nolan, a man in his 40s, who becomes the oldest rookie at the Los Angeles Police Department (LAPD). It is based on real-life LAPD officer William Norcross, who moved to Los Angeles in 2015 and joined the department in his mid-40s.

Produced by 20th Television and Lionsgate Television, The Rookie premiered on October 16, 2018. In April 2026, the series was renewed for a ninth season, becoming the third longest running series currently airing on ABC, which will premiere on January 6, 2027.

A spin-off series, The Rookie: Feds (2022–2023), followed the oldest rookie in the Federal Bureau of Investigation. A second spin-off, The Rookie: North, is set to debut on January 6, 2027.

== Premise ==
The series follows John Nolan, a 40-year-old newly divorced man from Pennsylvania, who – nine months after helping police officers during a bank robbery in his hometown, Foxburg – moves to Los Angeles to pursue a new career as a police officer in the LAPD. After graduating from the police academy as the oldest rookie on the force, Nolan must navigate the dangerous, unpredictable nature of his job. He is determined to make it in his new career despite the challenges.

During an interview, series lead Nathan Fillion said that the drama was inspired by a true story, as the LAPD is one of just two agencies that accepts new officers over the age of 37 years old. The man whose story inspired the premise of the show was later revealed to be William Norcross, a college friend of executive producer Jon Steinberg's, who based the show on his story. Norcross continues to serve in the LAPD and also as executive producer on The Rookie.

== Cast and characters ==
=== Main ===
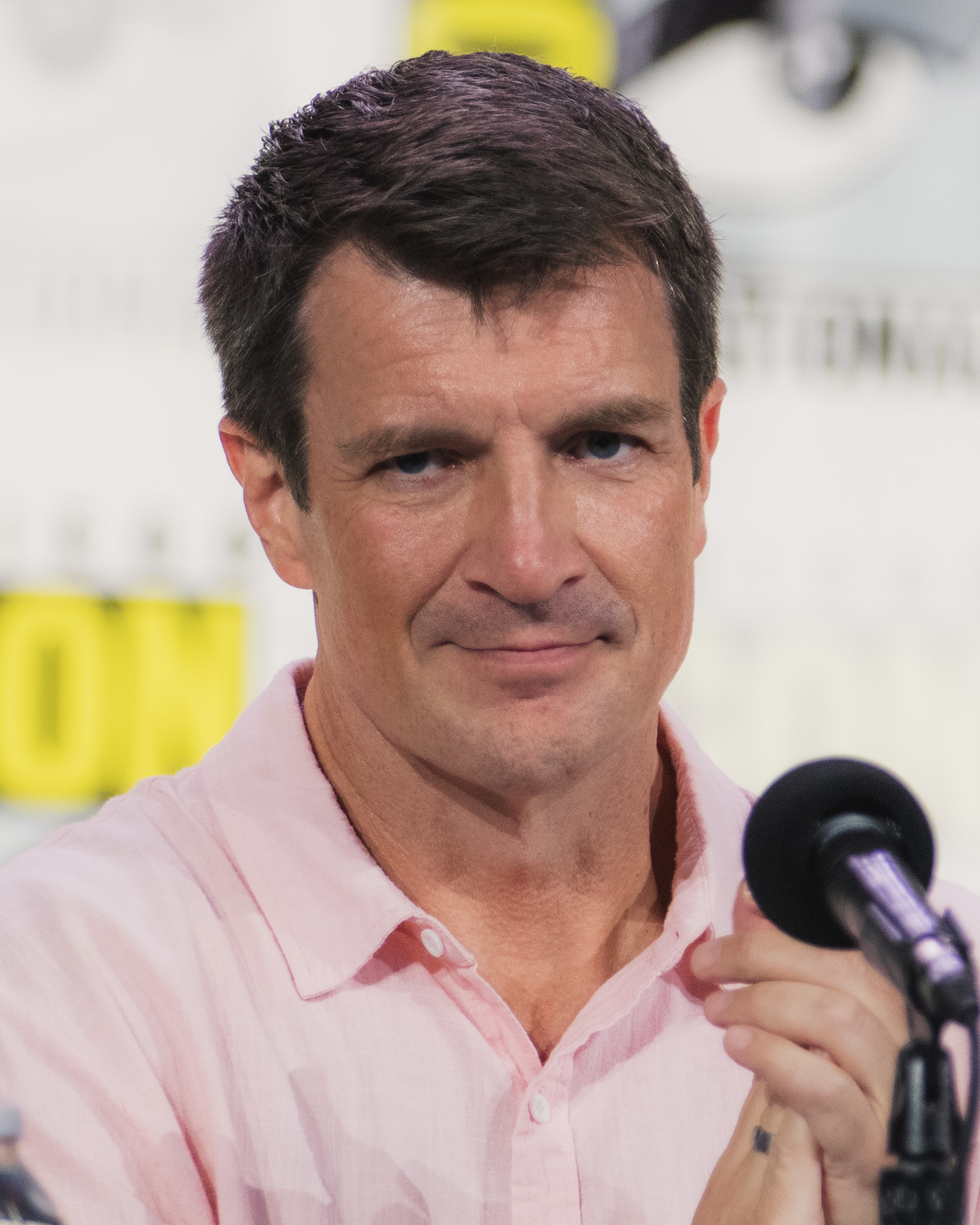
Nathan Fillion (John Nolan) at the 2026 San Diego Comic-Con

- Nathan Fillion as Jonathan "John" Nolan: The oldest rookie at the Los Angeles Police Department (LAPD), he is assigned to the Mid-Wilshire Division. He was studying at Pennsylvania State University, but dropped out and went into the construction business upon learning Sarah, his girlfriend (and eventual wife), was pregnant. At the age of 45, when facing a divorce notice, Nolan talks down a robbery attempt at a bank in his hometown of Foxburg. With a newfound purpose, he closes his construction company in Pennsylvania and moves out west to become a police officer. He is divorced, and Henry, his son, is away at college. Nolan becomes a training officer in the later seasons to teach the next generation of cops and help make positive change in the LAPD.
- Alyssa Diaz as Angela Lopez: An LAPD officer, she is assigned as the training officer to Jackson West. She marries Wesley Evers and becomes a detective and mother of two in the later seasons.
- Richard T. Jones as Wade Grey: A sergeant (later lieutenant), watch commander at the Mid-Wilshire Station, Grey initially believes Nolan may be changing careers because of a midlife crisis and doubts he is suitable for police work, but later comes to recognize him as a capable and competent police officer and friend. Grey served in the Army before joining the LAPD. He has a daughter who is attending college in New York City. He later takes a job in the FBI as a senior liaison.
- Titus Makin Jr. as Jackson West (seasons 1–3): An eager, if somewhat naive, rookie, he is the son of Commander Percy West, head of the LAPD's Internal Affairs Division. At the top of his class at the police academy, he is firmly committed to the LAPD and strives to be the best officer he can be, as he wants to maintain his family's traditions. He is killed in the fourth season premiere while trying to resist his and Lopez's abductions by La Fiera.
- Mercedes Mason as Zoe Andersen (season 1; guest season 3): Nolan's confident and irreverent commanding officer. Andersen, a police captain, used to be a Marine serving with the military police. After leaving the Marine Corps, she spent a year with the United States Pentagon Police Criminal Investigations Directorate before joining the LAPD. Because of her prior experience, Andersen has risen through the ranks very quickly, to the point where some of her officers see her more as a boss than a fellow officer. She is shot and killed late in the first season while protecting Nolan from a vengeful criminal.
- Melissa O'Neil as Lucy Chen: An ambitious rookie, she struggles to prove herself to Tim Bradford, her training officer. Her parents are psychologists who remain opposed to her choice of career. She later qualifies to become an undercover officer and starts dating Tim. She becomes a temporary training officer and a sergeant afterwards.
- Afton Williamson as Talia Bishop (season 1): A newly promoted training officer, her first assignment is Nolan. Ambitious, she tries hard to make detective and hopes to eventually work her way up to chief of police. She leaves the LAPD between the first and second seasons after information from her past that she withheld is brought to light and threatens to stall her career. She then joins the ATF for a fresh start.
- Eric Winter as Timothy "Tim" Bradford: A strict, no-nonsense training officer, he is assigned Lucy as a rookie and gives her a hard time, but treats her fairly. He used to be a U.S. Army staff sergeant who served in Iraq and Afghanistan before joining the LAPD. He later becomes a sergeant and watch commander.
- Mekia Cox as Nyla Harper (season 2 – present): Nolan's second training officer, a tough, experienced detective who is leaving behind four years of undercover work so she can return to patrol. After training Nolan and Aaron, marrying James Murray, and giving birth to a daughter named Leah, she returns to being a detective and is partnered with Angela Lopez. An incident in season 8 forces Harper to go back into uniformed service, where she takes over Miles Penn's training after his suspension.
- Shawn Ashmore as Wesley Evers (season 3 – present; recurring seasons 1–2): A defense lawyer with whom Lopez initially clashes, but later starts dating. The two eventually marry and have a son named Jackson, or "Jack", and a daughter named Emmy. He later takes a job as an assistant district attorney, before running and losing the race for Los Angeles County District Attorney in season 8. The victor's actions then spur him to quit the DA's office and go back to being a defense attorney.
- Jenna Dewan as Bailey Nune (season 4 – present; guest season 3): A firefighter lieutenant, she first appears at Nolan's door in only a towel and later becomes his wife by the sixth season. Before joining the LAFD, she served in the Army and remains a reservist.
- Tru Valentino as Aaron Thorsen (seasons 5–6; recurring season 4; guest season 8): A new rookie who was involved in a French murder case in which he was found not guilty. He comes from a wealthy background and was an internet celebrity before his arrest and trial. He transfers to the Hollywood Division for a fresh start following the scandal caused by corrupt police psychologist Blair London.
- Lisseth Chavez as Celina Juarez (season 6 – present; recurring season 5): Nolan's enthusiastic new rookie. She joined the academy to solve her sister's disappearance. Initially, she causes trouble for Nolan, as she is very superstitious. She is close friends with Bailey Nune and Aaron Thorsen.
- Deric Augustine as Miles Penn (season 8 – present; recurring season 7): One of the newest rookies in the LAPD. He spent two years with the Sugar Land Police Department in Texas after being injured during a football career in college. He is assigned to Tim, then Nolan, and then Harper as his training officer. He receives a six-month extension as a rookie in season 8 after performing a rogue investigation, but eventually graduates.

| Actor | Character | Seasons | | | | | | | | |
| Actor | Character | 1 | 2 | 3 | 4 | 5 | 6 | 7 | 8 | 9 |
|---|---|---|---|---|---|---|---|---|---|---|
| Nathan Fillion | John Nolan | Main | Main | Main | Main | Main | Main | Main | Main | Main |
| Alyssa Diaz | Angela Lopez | Main | Main | Main | Main | Main | Main | Main | Main | Main |
| Richard T. Jones | Wade Grey | Main | Main | Main | Main | Main | Main | Main | Main | Main |
| Titus Makin Jr. | Jackson West | Main | Main | Main | | | | | | |
| Mercedes Mason | Zoe Andersen | Main | | Guest (Note: Uncredited.) | | | | | | |
| Melissa O'Neil | Lucy Chen | Main | Main | Main | Main | Main | Main | Main | Main | Main |
| Afton Williamson | Talia Bishop | Main | | | | | | | | |
| Eric Winter | Tim Bradford | Main | Main | Main | Main | Main | Main | Main | Main | Main |
| Mekia Cox | Nyla Harper | | Main | Main | Main | Main | Main | Main | Main | Main |
| Shawn Ashmore | Wesley Evers | Recurring | Recurring | Main (Note: In season 3, Ashmore is only credited with the main cast in episodes he appears in.) | Main | Main | Main | Main | Main | Main |
| Jenna Dewan | Bailey Nune | | | Guest | Main (Note: Dewan is credited as a guest star prior to episode 4x10. She is only credited with the main cast in episodes she appears in.) | Main | Main | Main | Main | Main |
| Tru Valentino | Aaron Thorsen | | | | Recurring | Main | Main | | Guest | Guest |
| Lisseth Chavez | Celina Juarez | | | | | Recurring | Main | Main | Main | Main |
| Deric Augustine | Miles Penn | | | | | | | Recurring | Main (Note: Augustine is only credited with the main cast in episodes he appears in.) | Main |

=== Recurring ===
Introduced in Season 1

- Mircea Monroe as Isabel Bradford (season 1; guest season 5): Tim Bradford's ex-wife. She is a former undercover narcotics officer who developed a drug addiction as a result of her work. Tim breaks up with her to give her time to recover. She later reappears in season 5, after becoming sober, so she and Lucy can go undercover together.
- Sara Rue as Nell Forester (seasons 1–2; guest seasons 4, 6): A dispatcher for the LAPD. Tim bribes her to get the best calls. She is later revealed to be dating Elroy Basso.
- Currie Graham as Ben McRee (season 1; guest season 3): Nolan's friend since their school days. He lets Nolan stay in his mansion as a house guest until Nolan moves out. He leaves Los Angeles after being assaulted by a mugger who steals his car.
- Sarah Shahi as Jessica Russo (seasons 1–2): A former FBI hostage negotiator. She now runs her own security firm and is a published author. She later takes a job with the Department of Homeland Security while briefly dating Nolan. They break up when she realizes he is not ready to have more kids.
- Demetrius Grosse as Kevin Wolfe (season 1): A detective who is assigned to Isabel's case. He does not return after the death of his friend Detective Vestri.
- David DeSantos as Elijah Vestri (season 1): A detective who is assigned to Isabel's case. He dies of gunshot injuries sustained in an ambush that also wounds his friend Detective Wolfe.
- Zayne Emory as Henry Nolan (seasons 1–3; guest seasons 4, 6): John Nolan's son. He is a freshman in college, but drops out to work for Ben McRee's foundation. He becomes engaged to his girlfriend, Abigail, in the second season. In season 3, he is revealed to have tetralogy of Fallot, a congenital heart condition. He and Abigail eventually split up, as revealed in season 7.
- Michael Beach as Percy West (seasons 1, 3; guest season 6): Jackson's father, the commander of Internal Affairs. Oscar Hutchinson accuses him to Jackson of being a dirty cop back in the old days, causing a momentary rift between him and Jackson.
- Brent Huff as Quigley Smitty: A well-intentioned yet lazy police officer who does the bare minimum. He lives in "Shangri-La", a trailer community parked across the street from Mid-Wilshire. He was the station's union representative for years before being voted out and replaced by Nolan in season 4.
- Michael Trucco as Sean Del Monte: An assistant district attorney who assigns Nolan and Tim to a protective detail. He later decides to run for district attorney, but drops out after his son's life is threatened.
- Angel Parker as Luna Grey (seasons 1, 3–present): Wade Grey's wife and mother of their daughter Dominique.
- Matthew Glave as Oscar Hutchinson: A prisoner who escapes from a prison bus crash. He is later apprehended by Lopez and Jackson. Oscar eventually helps the precinct officers as an informant on several cases involving former prisoners, even helping Nolan and Harper save the warden's life. It is revealed he has a daughter Ashley from a previous relationship, when his DNA is a partial match in a crime. He later escapes prison.

Introduced in Season 2

- Jasmine Mathews as Rachel Hall (seasons 2, 7): Lucy Chen's friend from college. She becomes romantically involved with Tim Bradford before taking a job in New York.
- Harold Perrineau as Nicholas "Nick" Armstrong (season 2; guest season 3): A new night detective recently reassigned to Mid-Wilshire. Initially a role model for Nolan, he is later revealed to be a dirty cop working for a crime family.
- Daniel Lissing as Sterling Freeman / Skipper Young (season 2; guest season 3): A celebrity actor starring in a popular police procedural show. He briefly becomes Jackson's boyfriend before he is revealed to be a former Australian criminal named Skipper Young.
- Ali Larter as Dr. Grace Sawyer (season 2): A doctor at Shaw Memorial Hospital and Nolan's former college girlfriend with whom he briefly reconciles. They end things after she decides to give her marriage another try for her son.
- Enver Gjokaj as Donovan Town (seasons 2, 4): Harper's ex-husband, who initially has full custody of their daughter Lila. He later agrees to split custody for Lila's sake following Harper's decision to leave undercover work
- Carsyn Rose as Lila Town (seasons 2, 4; guest seasons 5, 8): Harper's daughter from her marriage to Donovan
- Madeleine Coghlan as Abigail Tierney (seasons 2–3; guest seasons 7-8): Henry Nolan's ex-fiancée. She has a criminal record for arson, despite it being retaliation against her ex for revenge porn.
- Annie Wersching as Rosalind Dyer (seasons 2, 5; guest season 3): A serial killer. She was arrested by Nick Armstrong, which led to her conviction for multiple murders. Rosalind later escapes prison.
- Jeff Pierre as Emmett Lang (season 2): A firefighter who is a friend of Tim Bradford's. He briefly dates Lucy.
- Hrach Titizian as Ruben Derian (season 2; guest season 3): A member of the Derian crime family

Introduced in Season 3

- Brandon Routh as Doug Stanton (season 3): Jackson's new training officer after Lopez is promoted to detective. He has immoral ethics and is prone to racial profiling.
- Arjay Smith as James Murray (season 3–present): A resident in the neighbourhood where Nolan and Harper are assigned to community outreach. He and Harper date and eventually marry.
- Toks Olagundoye as Fiona Ryan (season 3): A professor in ethics and criminal justice. Nolan attends her night classes to finish school and qualify as a training officer. She is also a well-known activist in civil rights and police reform. She has authored a book about racial inequality in the justice system.
- Dylan Conrique as Tamara Colins (season 3–7, 9): A homeless and orphaned high school student who steals Lucy's car. Lucy ultimately decides not to press charges, and they later become roommates and close friends.
- Camille Guaty as Sandra "La Fiera" de la Cruz (season 3; guest season 4): A Guatemalan businesswoman and drug lord who initially makes gestures of friendship to Lopez. She kidnapped Lopez after her son, Diego, was killed by a rival gang, hoping to steal the baby. Her plan failed, and she was shot dead by Angela Lopez.

Introduced in Season 4

- Brandon Jay McLaren as Elijah Stone (seasons 4–5; guest season 8): A crime boss who forces Wesley onto his payroll in exchange for information on how to retrieve Lopez from Guatemala. He is later arrested after several encounters with the LAPD.
- Gigi Zumbado as Abril Rodas (seasons 4–5): A vengeful hitwoman working for La Fiera as her right-hand woman and trusted enforcer
- Kanoa Goo as Chris Sanford (seasons 4–5): A deputy district attorney and Lucy Chen's ex-boyfriend
- Flula Borg as "Skip Tracer" Randy Spitz (season 4–present): A German bounty hunter and skip tracer. He occasionally works with the LAPD, first with Harper and eventually with Nolan in particular. He is eccentric and fails to understand personal boundaries.
- Peyton List as Genny Bradford (seasons 4-5, 7-present): Tim Bradford's younger sister.
- Steve Kazee as Jason Wyler (season 4; guest seasons 6–7): Bailey's psychologically abusive ex-husband.

Introduced in Season 5

- Bridget Regan as Monica Stevens (season 5–8): A lawyer and criminal mastermind who has represented many criminals in Los Angeles. She is first introduced as Elijah's new lawyer and Wesley's ex-fiancée.

Introduced in Season 6

- Danielle Campbell as Blair London (season 6): An LAPD psychiatrist who is assigned to help many officers, including Aaron Thorsen.

Introduced in Season 7

- Patrick Keleher as Seth Ridley (season 7–present): A nervous rookie who is good friends with Miles, Seth is a pathological liar who created several false, self-serving narratives, notably faking a cancer relapse. Seth leaves the force after saving Nolan during a shootout at the cost of a below-knee amputation and later comes clean about his lies.
- Zander Hawley as Rodge Bronson (season 7–present; guest seasons 5–6): A musician Nolan runs into while responding to a call. He writes and sings humorous songs about his encounters with Nolan. He begins dating Celina in season 7.
- Seth Gabel as Liam Glasser (season 7–present): A vending machine supplier whom Harper suspects of being a serial killer.
- Necar Zadegan as Vivian Eckert (seasons 7–8): An ambitious ADA whom Wesley runs against in the race for District Attorney of Los Angeles.

Introduced in Season 8

- Sean Patrick Thomas as Malcolm Walsh (season 8): The defense lawyer for Liam Glasser. Wesley suspects he is unethical and engaging in criminal behavior to get his client acquitted.

Introduced in Season 9

- Troian Bellisario as Stephanie "Stevie" Monroe (season 9): Nolan's newest rookie who is a recently divorced mother of two.
- Dulé Hill as Lt. Hughes (season 9): A veteran officer who becomes the new watch commander at Mid-Wilshire Station.
- Molly Kunz as Quinn (season 9): A small-town girl who moves to Los Angeles to make it big as an EMT.

=== Notable guests ===
- Danny Nucci as Sanford Motta: An arrogant assault detective who looks down on rookies
- Shawn Christian as Jeremy Hawke: Nolan's former training officer at the academy who goes rogue
- Joelle Carter as Megan Mitchell: Jeremy's ex-wife who is fighting with him over custody of their son Logan
- Niko Nicotera as Carson Miller: Isabel's former boyfriend and a drug dealer
- Jose Pablo Cantillo as Franco DeSantis: A drug dealer who steals money from a drug bust after being tipped off
- Beau Garrett as Denise: A woman whom Nolan rescues on Valentine's Day, who has an unhealthy obsession with him.
- Sean Maher as Caleb Jost: A prisoner who escapes from a prison bus crash but is later apprehended by Nolan, Talia, and Jessica.
- Mario Lopez as himself: A celebrity pulled over by Tim and Lucy for running a stop sign who tries to talk his way out of a ticket as part of an integrity test by Internal Affairs
- Joel McHale as Brad Hayes: A former border patrol officer who smuggles people for a cartel and is under the protective detail of Tim and Nolan
- Ashley Argota as Bella: A woman arrested by Tim and Lucy
- Jim Lau as Patrick Chen: Lucy Chen's father, who is injured by one of his patients and forced to go to the hospital. He later has an argument with Lucy regarding the LAPD's handling of mental health cases.
- will.i.am as himself: A celebrity who appears when a silent alarm is tripped at his residence, caused by a man who accidentally parachuted into the wrong yard and became stuck in a tree
- Stephen Lang as Trent Williams: The LAPD chief of police. He administers the oral exam to Nolan, Lucy, and Jackson during their midterm exam.
- Felicia Day as Dr. Morgan: A CDC task-force specialist in infectious diseases
- Mark Cuban as himself: A celebrity who appears when Nolan and Grey respond to a disturbance at his restaurant
- Mitch Pileggi as Rex: A bounty hunter and retired LAPD officer. He is good friends with Tim.
- Seamus Dever as Chaz Bachman: A lawyer who is arrested by Nolan and Lopez for buying drugs
- Jon Huertas as Alejandro Mejia / Cesar Ojeda: An undercover DHS agent who is compromised and nearly killed by two assailants seeking information from him
- Lauren Tom as Mrs. Chen: Lucy Chen's mother, who comes to stay at her apartment briefly after arguing with Lucy's father
- Eric Weddle as himself: An NFL player who appeared during a Los Angeles Rams junior football camp. He was a high school football adversary of Tim's.
- Robert Woods as himself: An NFL player who appeared during a Los Angeles Rams junior football camp
- Alan Tudyk as Elroy Basso: An employee of the LAPD who helps clean up crime scenes. He and Nolan later apprehend a group of criminals when they return to the scene of a crime. He is later seen to be in a relationship with Nell Forester.
- Michael Cassidy as Caleb Wright: A man Lucy meets at a bar who later turns out to be a serial killer and Rosalind Dyer's associate
- Pete Davidson as Pete Nolan: John Nolan's half-brother, whom he meets following their father's death
- Seth Green as Jordan Neil: A man who steals Nolan's identity, causing his credit score to go down
- Greg Grunberg as Larry "Badger" Macer: A former LAPD officer who was released after he misfired his gun during his first roll call. He is now a sergeant with the railroad police.
- Roselyn Sánchez as Valerie Castillo: An ambitious reporter
- Bailey Chase as Michael Banks: A DEA agent who assists Nolan and Harper during a drug raid
- Don Swayze as Sharp: A prison guard at the California Correctional Facility who assists Nolan and Harper during a riot
- Hannah Kasulka as Erin Cole: A rookie officer who is later revealed to be a dirty cop working for the Derians and who is shot dead by Armstrong
- Christopher O'Shea as Chris Rios: A rookie officer who is fatally shot by Serj Derian, leaving Jackson devastated as the two had been close friends
- Armin Shimerman as Judge Paloma: The on-call judge who approves the warrant for Nolan's arrest during the third season
- Frances Fisher as Evelyn Nolan: John Nolan's overbearing and manipulative mother
- Frankie Muniz as Corey Harris: A former child actor who now runs a cult
- Skyler Samuels as Charlotte Luster: Corey's childhood co-star and friend
- Rainn Wilson as himself: A celebrity who owns the mummified body of Charlie Chaplin and is interviewed by a true crime documentary
- Molly Quinn as Ashley: The daughter of prisoner Oscar Hutchinson, who is a person of interest in a kidnapping case
- Katy O'Brian as Katie Barnes: A new rookie in the LAPD who is a war veteran. Tim is assigned as her training officer, but she later resigns from the job.
- Emily Deschanel as Sarah Nolan: Nolan's ex-wife and mother to their son Henry
- Kyle Secor as Sam Taggart: A DEA special agent assigned to the La Fiera case
- Joshua Malina as Max: A man with ties to U.S. intelligence
- Tricia Helfer as Claire Ivey: A master thief whom Angela Lopez was after for five years but was unable to capture
- Kathryn Prescott as Katerina Antonov / Linda Charles: A Russian FSB case officer who went rogue and was planning to kill all the men involved in a drone strike that killed her brother
- Piper Curda as Billie Park: A drug mule who was arrested by Jackson and Lucy when she attempted to flee during a rolling stop
- Peter Onorati as Jerry McGrady: A police officer who rides his final shift with Tim before finally retiring after 43 years of service
- Helena Mattson as Ashley McGrady: Jerry McGrady's daughter. She is a lifeguard who has a brief relationship with Tim.
- James Remar as Tom Bradford: Tim and Genny Bradford's alcoholic and abusive father
- Eric Winter and Melissa O'Neil as Jake Butler and Sava Wu, a drug trafficker and his girlfriend who are the doppelgängers of Tim and Lucy, consequently nicknamed "Dim" and "Juicy" by the other. Tim and Lucy go undercover as them to take down a drug operation.
- Tamala Jones as Yvonne Thorsen: Aaron Thorsen's wealthy mother. She is trying to publicize his life as a police officer.
- Thomas Dekker as Jeffrey Boyle / Eli Reynolds: An acolyte of Rosalind Dyer
- Kelly Clarkson as herself
- Kyle Schmid as Noah Foster: An undercover detective who was a classmate of Lucy's
- Preeti Desai as Charlie Bristow: A private security agent hired by Wesley
- Nisalda Gonzalez as Daylin Morales: The girlfriend of Abril Rodas and first lieutenant of the Malos Dorales under her leadership
- Lance Bass as himself
- Jake Tapper as himself
- David Dastmalchian as Ray Watkins: A former member of Tim's army squad who betrayed him in the past
- Neil Hopkins as Eric Ramsey: An enigmatic businessman and criminal
- Jimmy Gonzales as Malvado: A hitman who is trying to kill Jason Wyler
- Noel Fisher as Harrison Novak: A serial killer
- Maria Zhang as Kylie Thomas: A friend of James who is being targeted by the Sixth Street Devils gang
- Cooper Manning as himself
- Beckett Hawley as Dash: A teenager who is skilled with cameras and drones
- Sela Ward as Joy Bradford: Tim and Genny's mother, from whom Tim concealed his divorce from Isabel and his relationship with Lucy
- Charles Michael Davis as Oliver Ashton: A doctor at St. Stephens Hospital whom Luna admits to Wade she is having emotional feelings for
- Michael Nouri as Pierre: Aaron's personal jeweler, who helps Tim pick out an engagement ring for Lucy

=== Crossover characters ===
From The Rookie: Feds

- Niecy Nash as Simone Clark (seasons 4–5): A trainee FBI agent who has the same priorities as John Nolan and is the protagonist of The Rookie: Feds
- James Lesure as Carter Hope (seasons 5–7): Simone's training agent
- Britt Robertson as Laura Stensen (seasons 5–7): Simone's FBI colleague
- Felix Solis as Matthew "Matt" Garza (seasons 4–present): An FBI special agent in charge and team leader
- Kevin Zegers as Brendan Acres (seasons 5–7), Simone's friend and FBI colleague
- Devika Bhise as Antoinette Benneteau (season 7): An FBI agent and Brendan's partner
- Michelle Nuñez as Elena Flores (season 8): Garza's niece and the Special Investigative Unit's tech analyst

Other

- Ryan Seacrest, Katy Perry, Luke Bryan and Lionel Richie as themselves: The host and judges of American Idol
- The cast of Game Changer (Anna Garcia, Vic Michaelis, Zac Oyama, Sam Reich, and Jacob Wysocki) as themselves

== Episodes ==
| Season | Episodes | Originally released | |
| Season | Episodes | First released | Last released |
|---|---|---|---|
| 1 | 20 | October 16, 2018 | April 16, 2019 |
| 2 | 20 | September 29, 2019 | May 10, 2020 |
| 3 | 14 | January 3, 2021 | May 16, 2021 |
| 4 | 22 | September 26, 2021 | May 15, 2022 |
| 5 | 22 | September 25, 2022 | May 2, 2023 |
| 6 | 10 | February 20, 2024 | May 21, 2024 |
| 7 | 18 | January 7, 2025 | May 13, 2025 |
| 8 | 18 | January 6, 2026 | May 4, 2026 |

== Production ==
=== Development ===
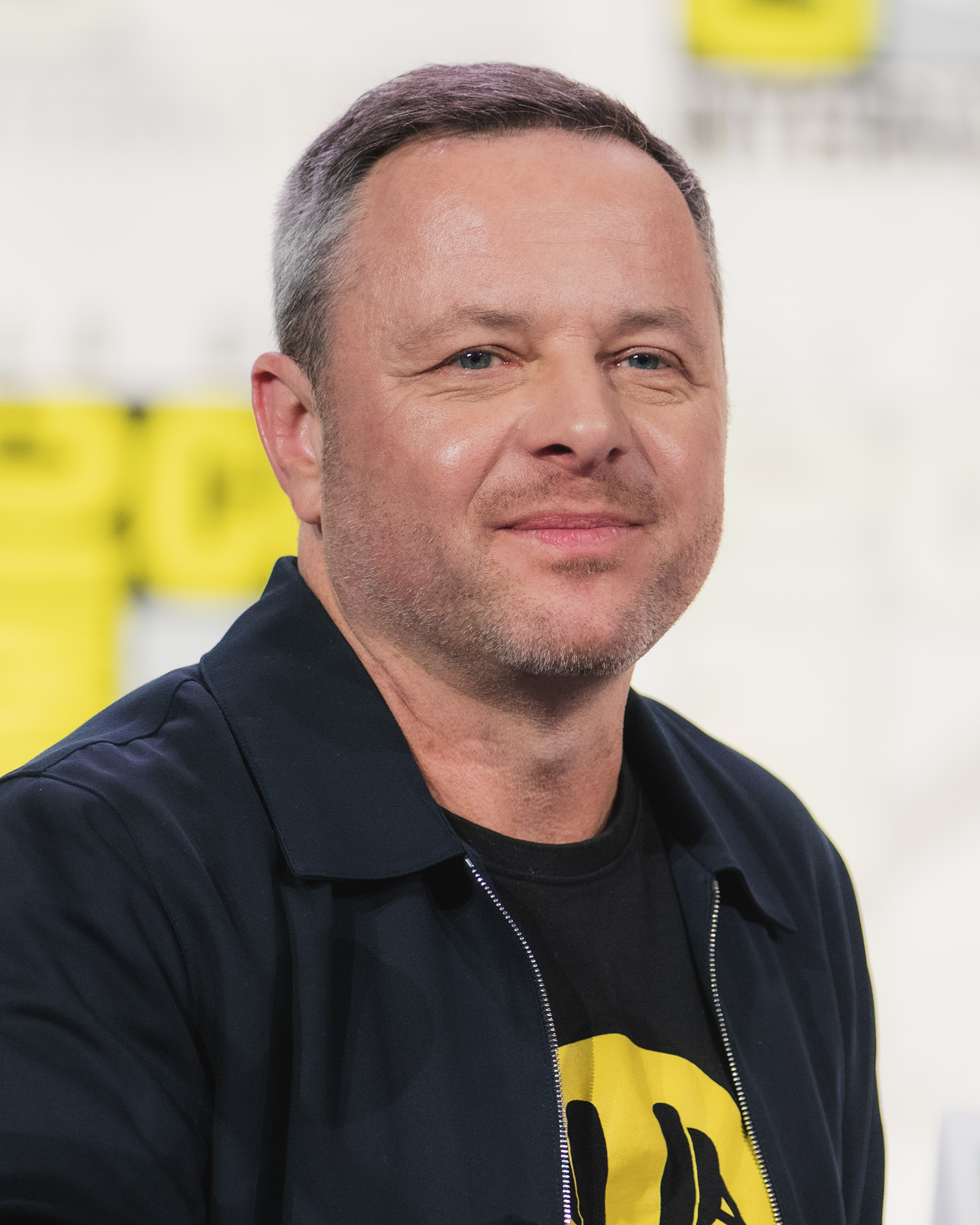
The Rookie creator Alexi Hawley

On October 26, 2017, ABC announced a straight-to-series order for The Rookie, starring Castle star Nathan Fillion, and written by Castle executive producer and co-showrunner Alexi Hawley. Fillion and Hawley serve as executive producers, along with Mark Gordon, Nicholas Pepper, Michelle Chapman, and Jon Steinberg. The series is produced by ABC Studios and the Mark Gordon Company, and premiered on October 16, 2018. On November 5, 2018, The Rookie was picked up for full season of 20 episodes. On May 10, 2019, ABC renewed the series for a second season which premiered on September 29, 2019. On October 28, 2019, the series received a full season order of 20 episodes for the second season.

On May 21, 2020, ABC renewed the series for a third season which premiered on January 3, 2021. On May 14, 2021, ABC renewed the series for a fourth season, which premiered on September 26, 2021. On March 30, 2022, ABC renewed the series for a fifth season which premiered on September 25, 2022. On April 17, 2023, ABC renewed the series for a sixth season which premiered on February 20, 2024. On February 17, 2024, executive producer and showrunner Alexi Hawley confirmed in an interview with TVLine that the sixth season would contain ten episodes. On April 15, 2024, ABC renewed the series for a seventh season, which premiered on January 7, 2025. On April 3, 2025, ABC renewed the series for an eighth season, which premiered on January 6, 2026. On April 13, 2026, ABC renewed the series for a ninth season, which is scheduled to premiere on January 6, 2027.

=== Casting ===
With the series order in October 2017, Fillion was cast as John Nolan. On February 7, 2018, Afton Williamson and Eric Winter were cast as Talia Bishop and Tim Bradford, respectively. They were shortly followed by Melissa O'Neil as Lucy Chen, Richard T. Jones as Sergeant Wade Grey, Titus Makin Jr. as Jackson West, Alyssa Diaz as Angela Lopez, and Mercedes Mason as Captain Zoe Andersen.

On August 4, 2019, it was announced that Williamson would not be returning for the second season due to the alleged racial discrimination, sexual harassment, and sexual assault she suffered during the first season. On October 2, 2019, Mekia Cox joined the cast as a new series regular, Nyla Harper, for the second season.

On September 27, 2021, it was announced that Makin Jr. would not be returning to the show due to his personal conviction that the show's portrayal of a Black police officer did not adequately address the realities of police brutality and racial injustice, particularly in the wake of the George Floyd and Breonna Taylor killings. On November 1, 2021, Jenna Dewan was upped to regular for season 4. On July 21, 2022, Tru Valentino joined the main cast for season 5. On August 8, 2024, it was confirmed he would exit the series before season 7 due to creative reasons.

On December 14, 2023, Lisseth Chavez was promoted to regular for season 6. On April 22, 2025, it was announced that Deric Augustine will be upped to regular for season 8.

=== Filming ===
In January 2018, Liz Friedlander signed on to direct and executive produce the pilot. Production on the pilot began on March 7, 2018, with filming taking place in Los Angeles, Oxnard, Burbank and New York City. On April 15, 2021, police received a call of a possible shooting while filming was taking place between Hartford Avenue and West 5th Street in Los Angeles. Three gunshots were heard by various eyewitnesses, and the production crew confirmed that no one from the show was injured during the incident. Filming in the area was shut down as a result of the reports, but filming continued at other already scheduled locations. Following the death of cinematographer Halyna Hutchins on October 21, 2021, on the set of the film Rust, live weapons were banned from The Rookie while filming. Prior to the ban, the series occasionally used quarter or half rounds on large outdoor set pieces. Showrunner Alexi Hawley stated that "any risk is too much risk" and explained that, going forward, only airsoft guns would be used, with muzzle flashes being added in post-production using computer-generated imagery.

In 2025, the show filmed scenes in Prague, Czech Republic, for the premiere of season 8.

=== On-set misconduct and harassment allegations ===
On July 26, 2019, TVLine reported that Afton Williamson, who portrays Talia Bishop, would not be returning for the second season. While the outlet initially claimed that the split was amicable, Williamson, in a lengthy Instagram post, stated that she left the series due to having "experienced racial discrimination/racially charged inappropriate comments from the hair department". The head of the hair department was identified as Sallie Ciganovich. Williamson also alleged that she was sexually harassed by guest star Demetrius Grosse, who portrays Kevin Wolfe in a recurring role, as well as an incident of bullying that escalated into sexual assault at a party. Williamson claimed that she had gone to the showrunners multiple times with these allegations, but was ignored.

Everyone involved in the allegations denied them. An investigation was commissioned through the law firm Mitchell Sillerberg and Knupp along with a third-party firm, EXTTI, which conducted nearly 400 hours of interviews and examined video and other evidence. The results of the investigation were published on September 17, 2019, which found that the allegations made by Williamson had no merit and could not be proven. Williamson stood by her claims, calling the results of the investigation "heartbreaking" and postulated that the producers had lied to cover up the truth of what happened.

== Release ==
=== Broadcast ===
The Rookie is broadcast in the United States on ABC and repeats are syndicated across 95% of the country. The first season aired on Tuesday, while the second season aired on Sunday. The Rookie has been licensed in more than 180 countries and territories under distribution from Lionsgate Television. As of April 1, 2025, the first five seasons of The Rookie were made available for streaming on Disney+ via the Star content hub in Australia and New Zealand. It is also streaming on Netflix in most regions and on Paramount+, Crave and Netflix in Canada.

=== Syndication ===
In 2024, reruns of The Rookie began airing on Lifetime.

=== Home media ===
The first season was released on DVD in Region 1 on August 27, 2019, and in Region 4 (Australia) on January 22, 2020.

| DVD name | Release dates | | | Episodes | Discs |
| DVD name | Region 1 | Region 2 | Region 4 | Episodes | Discs |
|---|---|---|---|---|---|
| 1 | August 27, 2019 | —N/a | January 22, 2020 | 20 | 4 |
| 2 | —N/a | —N/a | February 24, 2021 | 20 | 5 |
| 3 | —N/a | —N/a | February 16, 2022 | 14 | 4 |
| 4 | —N/a | —N/a | August 31, 2022 | 22 | 6 |
| 5 | —N/a | —N/a | February 12, 2025 | 22 | 6 |
| 6 | —N/a | —N/a | July 2, 2025 | 10 | 3 |
| 7 | —N/a | —N/a | April 8, 2026 | 18 | 4 |

== Reception ==
=== Critical response ===
The review aggregation website Rotten Tomatoes reported a 68% approval rating with an average rating of 6.3/10 based on 22 reviews for Season 1. The website's consensus reads, "Nathan Fillion's reliably likable presence makes The Rookie worth tuning in, even if the show around him isn't particularly memorable." Metacritic, which uses a weighted average, assigned a score of 64 out of 100 based on 12 critics, indicating "generally favorable reviews".

=== Ratings ===
Viewership and ratings per season of The Rookie
| Season | Timeslot (ET) | Episodes | First aired | | Last aired | | TV season | Viewership rank | Avg. viewers (millions) | 18–49 rank | Avg. 18–49 rating |
| Season | Timeslot (ET) | Episodes | Date | Viewers (millions) | Date | Viewers (millions) | TV season | Viewership rank | Avg. viewers (millions) | 18–49 rank | Avg. 18–49 rating |
|---|---|---|---|---|---|---|---|---|---|---|---|
| 1 | Tuesday 10:00 p.m. | 20 | October 16, 2018 | 5.43 | April 16, 2019 | 4.06 | 2018–19 | 48 | 7.79 | 50 | 1.4 |
| 2 | Sunday 10:00 p.m. | 20 | September 29, 2019 | 4.11 | May 10, 2020 | 4.66 | 2019–20 | 32 | 8.19 | 33 | 1.3 |
| 3 | Sunday 10:00 p.m. | 14 | January 3, 2021 | 3.44 | May 16, 2021 | 3.77 | 2020–21 | 29 | 7.11 | 34 | 1.0 |
| 4 | Sunday 10:00 p.m. | 22 | September 26, 2021 | 3.03 | May 15, 2022 | 3.65 | 2021–22 | 33 | 6.44 | 33 | 0.8 |
| 5 | Sunday 10:00 p.m. (2022); Tuesday 8:00 p.m. (2023) | 22 | September 25, 2022 | 3.36 | May 2, 2023 | 4.33 | 2022–23 | 25 | 6.47 | 32 | 0.7 |
| 6 | Tuesday 9:00 p.m. | 10 | February 20, 2024 | 3.77 | May 21, 2024 | 3.14 | 2023–24 | 33 | 5.92 | 40 | 0.6 |
| 7 | Tuesday 10:00 p.m. (1–6, 16); Tuesday 9:00 p.m. (7–15, 17–18) | 18 | January 7, 2025 | 3.41 | May 13, 2025 | 3.02 | 2024–25 | 10 | 10.80 | 3 | 2.49 |
| 8 | Tuesday 10:00 p.m. (1–3); Monday 10:00 p.m. (4–18) | 18 | January 6, 2026 | 3.36 | May 4, 2026 | 2.97 | 2025–26 | 6 | 10.6 | 5 | 2.61 |
| 9 | Wednesday 9:00 p.m. | TBA | January 6, 2027 | TBD | TBA | TBD | 2026–27 | TBD | TBD | TBD | TBD |

== Spin-offs ==
On February 8, 2022, ABC ordered a pilot for a planned FBI spin-off of the series starring Niecy Nash. It was introduced in a two-episode backdoor pilot during Season 4. On March 9, 2022, Kat Foster and Felix Solis joined the cast of the spin-off. Also that month, Frankie Faison joined the cast. On May 13, 2022, ABC gave a series order under the title The Rookie: Feds. It was then reported that the series had undergone creative tweaks that cut Foster's character, Special Agent Casey Fox. In June 2022, Britt Robertson, Kevin Zegers and James Lesure joined the cast as series regulars. The Rookie: Feds aired from September 27, 2022, to May 2, 2023. It was canceled on November 9, 2023, after one season as a consequence of the 2023 WGA and SAG-AFTRA strikes.

On December 5, 2024, it was reported that a second spin-off series was in development. The series would be set in Washington state and center around a "male cop who is stepping into a new phase of life in his second act". Created by Hawley; Fillion, Norcross, and Chapman would serve as executive producers. The series will be co-produced by Lionsgate Television and 20th Television. By July 2025 the project had entered the casting stage under the working title The Rookie: North, and was on track to receive an order for a pilot episode. Casting was delayed in September to allow more development time for the script and in hopes that a more well-known actor would become available. At this time, Hawley anticipated that filming would begin in early 2026. In May 2026, The Rookie: North received a series order. In October 2026, it was announced during New York Comic Con 2026 that the series will premiere on January 6, 2027.
