= Deric Augustine =

American actor and writer (born 1990)

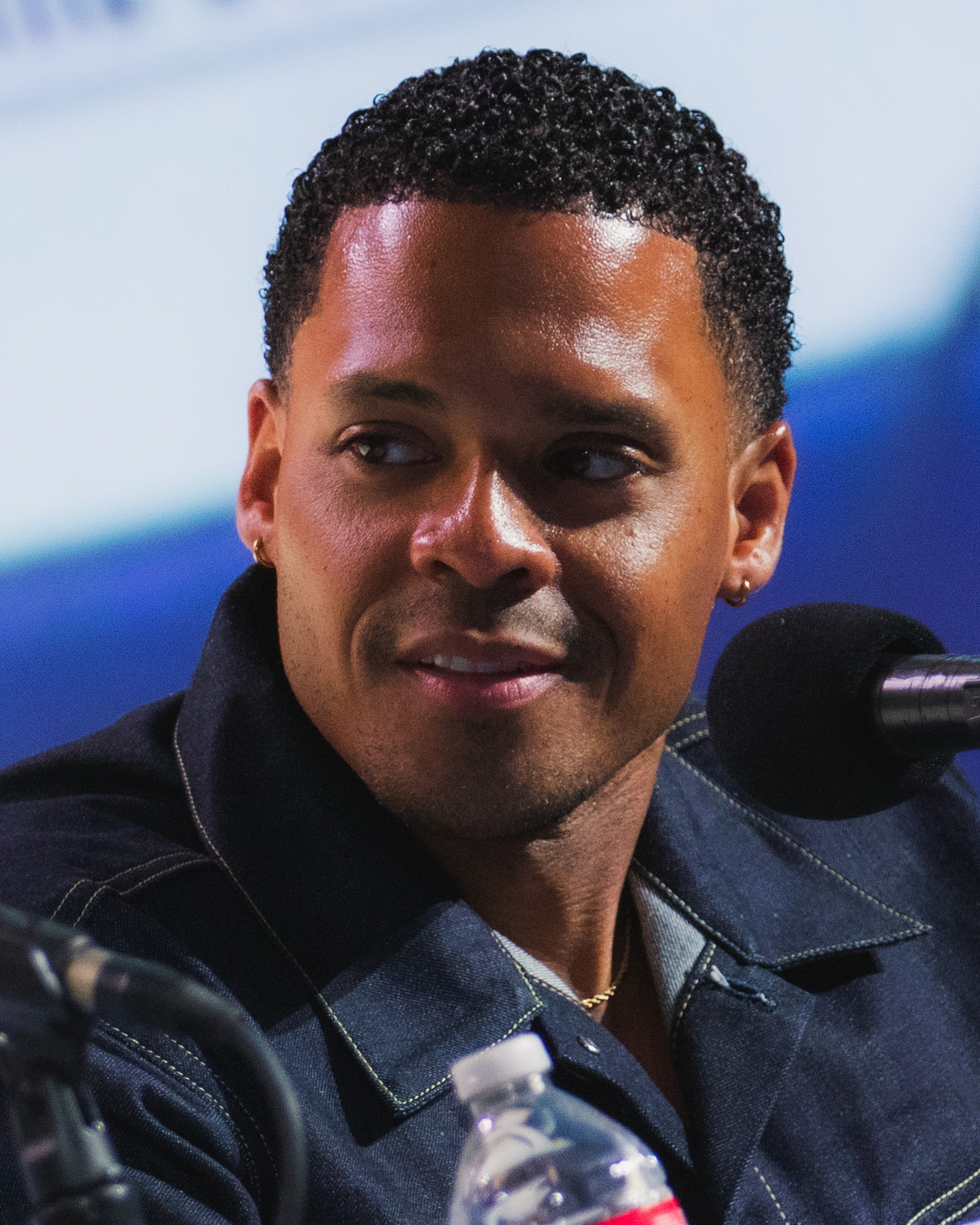
- Augustine in 2026
- Born: April 3, 1990 (age 36)
- Education: University of New Orleans
- Occupations: Actor; novelist; producer
- Writing career
- Period: 2025
- Genres: Young adult; fantasy

Deric Augustine (born April 3, 1990) is a film and television actor, and novelist. He stars as Miles Penn, one of the main characters in the ABC police procedural series The Rookie (2025–2026). He also had recurring roles of Muhammad Ali in the MGM+ crime drama series Godfather of Harlem (2019–2021, 2025), Clay Taylor in the CW sports drama series All American (2021–2023), and Jace in the BET+ crime family drama series The Family Business: New Orleans (2025). He also appeared in the television series such as Queen Sugar (2016), The Vampire Diaries (2016), Cloak & Dagger (2018), Criminal Minds (2018), Shameless (2020–2021), and Swagger (2021). In 2025, Augustine published a young adult fantasy novel, titled Nawlins.

== Biography ==
Deric Augustine grew up in New Orleans in Louisiana, United States. He was a theatre actor in high school, and graduated in theatre arts from the University of New Orleans. Following the graduation, he moved to New York City, acting for the Negro Ensemble Company and William Esper Studio. Later he moved to Los Angeles, California.

Augustine appeared in the television series such as Queen Sugar (2016), The Vampire Diaries (2016), Cloak & Dagger (2018), Criminal Minds (2018), Shameless (2020–2021), and Swagger (2021). He also starred as DJ Yella in the 2016 biographical drama television film Surviving Compton: Dre, Suge & Michel'le. Augustine had recurring roles of Muhammad Ali in the MGM+ crime drama series Godfather of Harlem (2019–2021, 2025), Clay Taylor in the CW sports drama series All American (2021–2023), and Jace in the BET+ crime family drama series The Family Business: New Orleans (2025). Since 2025, he stars as Miles Penn, one of the main characters in the ABC police procedural series The Rookie.

Augustine wrote a young adult fantasy novel, titled Nawlins, which he self-published in 2025. He also founded the Augustine's Love Foundation, a nonprofit organization supporting families affected by stroke and intracranial aneurysm. It is dedicated in memory of his late mother, Donna Augustine.

== Filmography ==
=== Films ===
Year	Title	Role	Notes
2014	The Seven Hands of God	Lazarus	Feature film
2014	When the Game Stands Tall	Senior student #2	Feature film
2016	Surviving Compton: Dre, Suge & Michel'le	DJ Yella	Television film
2017	S.L.A.G.	Chad Trace	Television film
2017	Secrets	Chris	Feature film
2017	Where I Stand	Young Lawrence	Feature film
2018	The Delta Girl	Isaiah	Short film
2020	It's Time	Deano Orr	Feature film
2020	Monster	Scott	Short film
2020	Us Against the End	Brandon	Short film
2022	Night Night	Detective Sheppard	Feature film
2023	Hours.	Bradley	Short film; also executive producer
2024	Eyes on Me	Deric	Short film
2025	Negro League Nights	Doc Sykes	Short film; also executive producer

=== Television series ===
Year	Title	Role	Notes
2016	Side Chick	James	2 episodes
2016	Notorious	Imran	Episode: "Pilot"
2016	Queen Sugar	Felix Evans	Episode: "Give Us This Day"
2016	The Vampire Diaries	College fraternity member	Episode: "I Went to the Woods"
2016–2017	Saints & Sinners	Young Levi Sterling	4 episodes
2017	The Quad	Mitchell #80	Episode: "Pilot"
2018	Cloak & Dagger	Rockwell	2 episodes
2018	Criminal Minds	Ray Murphy	Episode: "Annihilator"
2018	Giants	Boobie	Episode: "Okay in the Silence"
2019–2021, 2025	Godfather of Harlem	Muhammad Ali	Recurring role; 4 episodes
2020–2021	Shameless	Milton	2 episodes
2021	Swagger	Lester Davis	2 episodes
2021–2023	All American	Clay Taylor	Recurring role; 11 episodes
2022	Soulmates	Dmitri	Episode: "Got It All Figured Out"; also producer
2025	The Family Business: New Orleans	Jace	Recurring role; 7 roles
2025–2026	The Rookie	Miles Penn	Main role; 29 episodes

=== Video games ===
Year	Title	Role	Notes
2019	NBA 2K20	Che	Voice
2020	NBA 2K21	Che	Voice
2021	NBA 2K22	Che	Voice

== Books ==
Title	Publication date	Publisher	ISBN	Notes
Nawlins	August 5, 2025	Self-published	9798218880255	Novel
