= Lisseth Chavez =

American actress (born 1989)

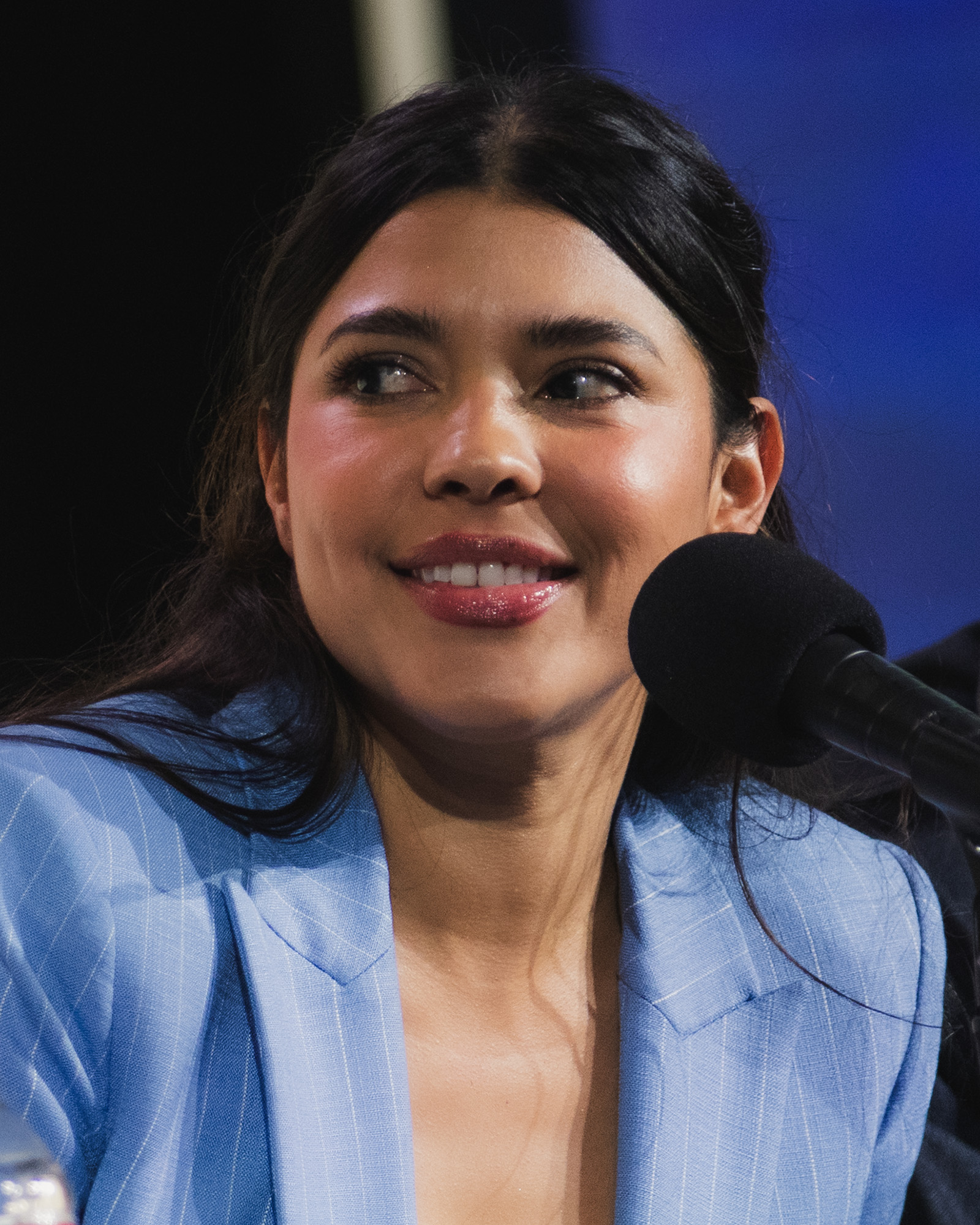
- Chavez in 2026
- Born: May 25, 1989 (age 37); U.S.
- Occupation: Actress
- Years active: 2009–present
- Known for: The Fosters; Chicago P.D. DC's Legends of Tomorrow; The Rookie
- Height: 5 ft 6 in (168 cm)

Lisseth Chavez (born May 25, 1989) is an American actress known for her roles in Chicago P.D., The Rookie, and The Fosters. Chavez appeared as Esperanza "Spooner" Cruz in the sixth and seventh seasons of the CW superhero series Legends of Tomorrow.

== Early life ==
Chavez is of Salvadoran heritage. She was born on May 25, 1989.

== Career ==
Chavez worked as a model early in her career. She first appeared to TV audiences in 2009's reality beauty contest, True Beauty. She acted professionally for the first time in an episode of The Baby (2011). Chavez has appeared in individual episodes of Southland, Shameless, Lucifer, Rizzoli & Isles, and others. She started to garner more significant roles starting in 2016 with her work on The Night Shift, followed by a featured character run on The Fosters. She played characters with multiple episode-arcs on Station 19 and The OA in 2019.

Chavez lead role has grown to include her playing rookie officer Vanessa Rojas on NBC's "Chicago" franchise shows (Chicago P.D., Chicago Med, and Chicago Fire), a role originally designed to create long-term romantic tension with character Kevin Atwater, initiated in season seven of the series, but cut short by the COVID-19 pandemic. The character arc ended there, as it was announced during the break that Chavez could not return to complete her character's story-line. This was due to the fact the character "...never entirely clicked with fans or the producers." The timing of the change, however, allowed Chavez to take on the new role of a tech-geek with a tragic past, Esperanza "Spooner" Cruz, in The CW's Legends of Tomorrow sixth season. In the episode "The Fixed Point" (2022), Cruz comes out as asexual; she is the first Arrowverse character to do so.

Then starting in 2022 she began appearing on ABC police procedural drama The Rookie in its fifth season in a recurring role then being promoted to the main cast as Officer Celina Juarez.

== Awards and recognition ==
In 2020, the Imagen Awards, referred to by the industry as the "Latino Golden Globes," nominated Chavez in the 'Best Supporting Actress: Television' category for her work on Chicago P.D.

== Filmography ==
=== Film ===
| Year | Title | Role | Notes |
|---|---|---|---|
| 2016 | BFFs | Bella | Short film |
| 2021 | Terror Eyes | Rebecca | Aka Voyeur |

=== Television ===
| Year | Title | Role | Notes |
|---|---|---|---|
| 2009 | True Beauty | Herself | |
| 2011 | The Baby | Maritza | Episode: "The Interviews" |
| 2013 | Southland | Carmen Martinez | Episode: "Bleed Out" |
| 2015 | The Adversaries | Cindy | TV film |
| 2015 | Shameless | Marita | Episode: "Crazy Love" |
| 2015 | The Night Shift | Ana | Episode: "Fog of War" |
| 2016 | Rush Hour | clerk | Episode: "Badass Cop" |
| 2016 | Lucifer | Nikki | Episode: "A Priest Walks Into a Bar" |
| 2016 | Murder in the First | Skylar Jennings | 3 episodes |
| 2016 | Rizzoli & Isles | Carmen | Episode: "Dangerous Curve Ahead" |
| 2017 | Grey's Anatomy | Kate Endris | Episode: "Civil War" |
| 2017 | One Day at a Time | Young Lydia | Episode: "A Snowman's Tale" |
| 2017 | One of Us | Haley Cooper | TV film |
| 2017 | S.W.A.T. | Ariana Acosta | Episode: "Fences" |
| 2017–18 | The Fosters | Ximena Sinfuego | Recurring role; 18 episodes |
| 2018 | Get Christie Love | Val | TV film |
| 2019 | Station 19 | Kathleen "Kat" Noonan | 2 episodes |
| 2019 | The OA | Carmen | 2 episodes |
| 2019 | Chicago Fire | Officer Vanessa Rojas | Episode: "Infection, pt. 1" |
| 2019 | Chicago Med | Officer Vanessa Rojas | Episode: "Infection, pt. 2" |
| 2019−20 | Chicago P.D. | Officer Vanessa Rojas | Main role; 19 episodes |
| 2021–22 | Legends of Tomorrow | Esperanza "Spooner" Cruz | Main role; Seasons 6–7; 28 episodes |
| 2022−present | The Rookie | Officer Celina Juarez | Recurring role, Season 5; Main role, Season 6–present |
