= Mekia Cox =

American actress and dancer

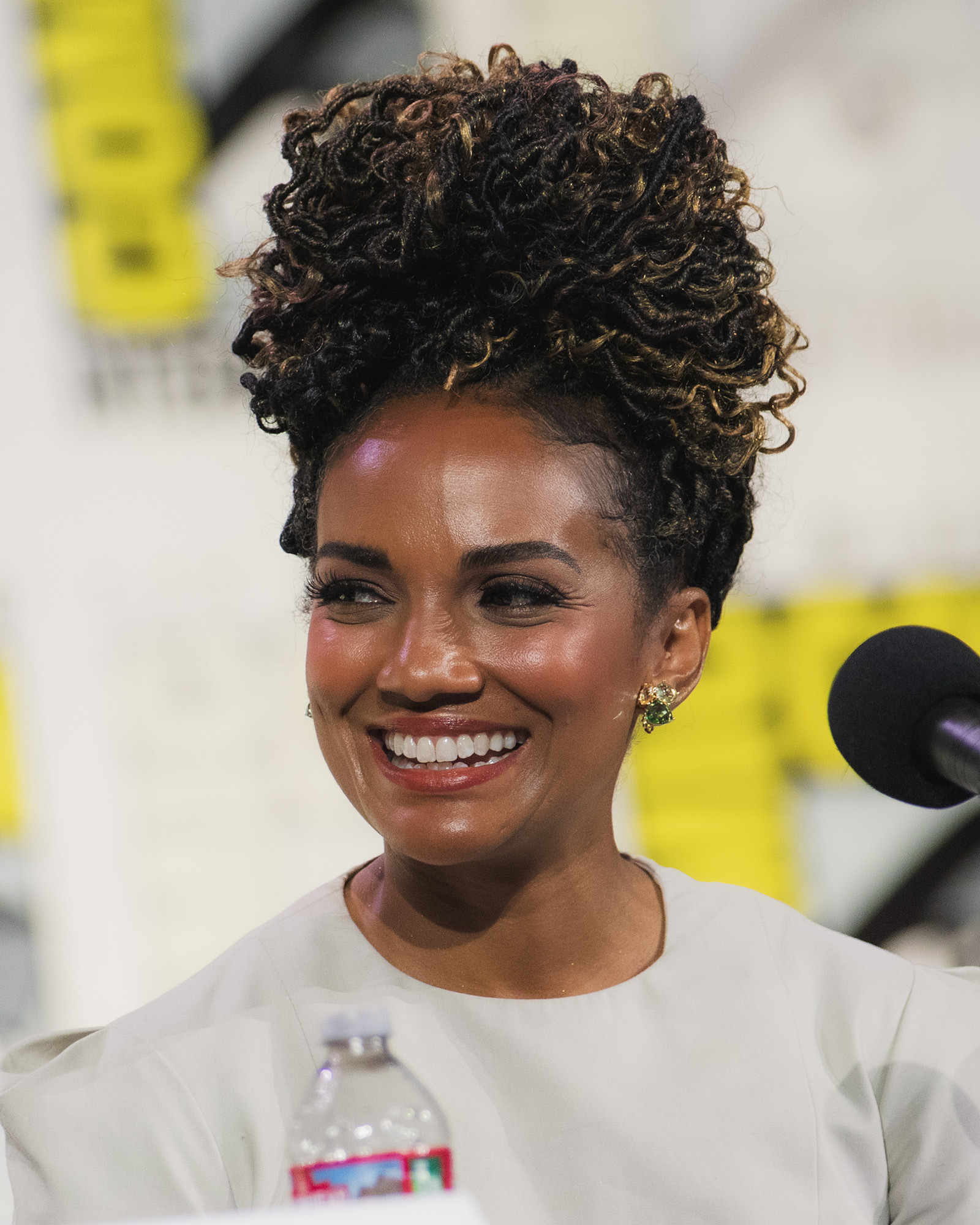
- Cox in 2026
- Education: Florida State University (BM)
- Occupations: Actress, dancer, vocal artist
- Years active: 1994–present
- Spouse: Britt Leach (m. 2018)
- Children: 2

Mekia Cox is an American actress and dancer, known for her roles as Sasha in the CW drama 90210, Dr. Robin Charles in the NBC medical drama Chicago Med, Princess Tiana in Once Upon A Time, and Detective Nyla Harper in the ABC police drama The Rookie.

In 2010, she co-starred as Lizzy Gilliam in the short-lived NBC spy drama Undercovers. She is also known for her role as a dancer in the Michael Jackson concert series This Is It and the related film Michael Jackson's This Is It, and for portraying Princess Tiana in the ABC fantasy drama Once Upon a Time.

As a youth, Cox had a history of dance and theater training experience. Much of her early work was associated with Universal Studios and Nickelodeon. She continued to train in the performing arts in high school and college. Subsequently, she toured nationally in stage productions of musicals, including Fame.

== Early life and education ==
Cox is originally from St. Croix (U.S. Virgin Islands). She moved with her family to Orlando, Florida, at age seven after spending five years of her youth studying dance in the U.S. Virgin Islands. In 1989, Cox was invited to participate in the Disney's Magic Kingdom Christmas Spectacular. As a child actor, Cox appeared in Nickelodeon shows, including My Brother and Me, Kenan & Kel and All That.

Cox was a 1999 graduate of Dr. Phillips High School where she was enrolled in the Visual and Performing Arts magnet program for vocal performance. She earned a Bachelor of Music degree from Florida State University in 2003 after being accepted to their Musical Theater program. During her summers she worked at the Heritage Repertory Theater in Charlottesville, Virginia, where she played roles in Smokey Joe's Cafe and Anything Goes one summer and performed as a recurring character in the Nickelodeon sitcom Noah Knows Best during another. Other regional theater credits include Rent, where she played club dancer and drug addict Mimi Márquez, the Chicago role of Liz, and Frenchie in Cabaret.

After graduating, she played Sarah in Ragtime, the musical at Merry-Go-Round Theater in Auburn, New York. Then Cox toured nationally for two years as Carmen in Fame, as well as revisiting her role as Brenda in Smokey Joe's Café. After touring and landing her first television role, she moved to Los Angeles, where she established a permanent residence.

== Career ==
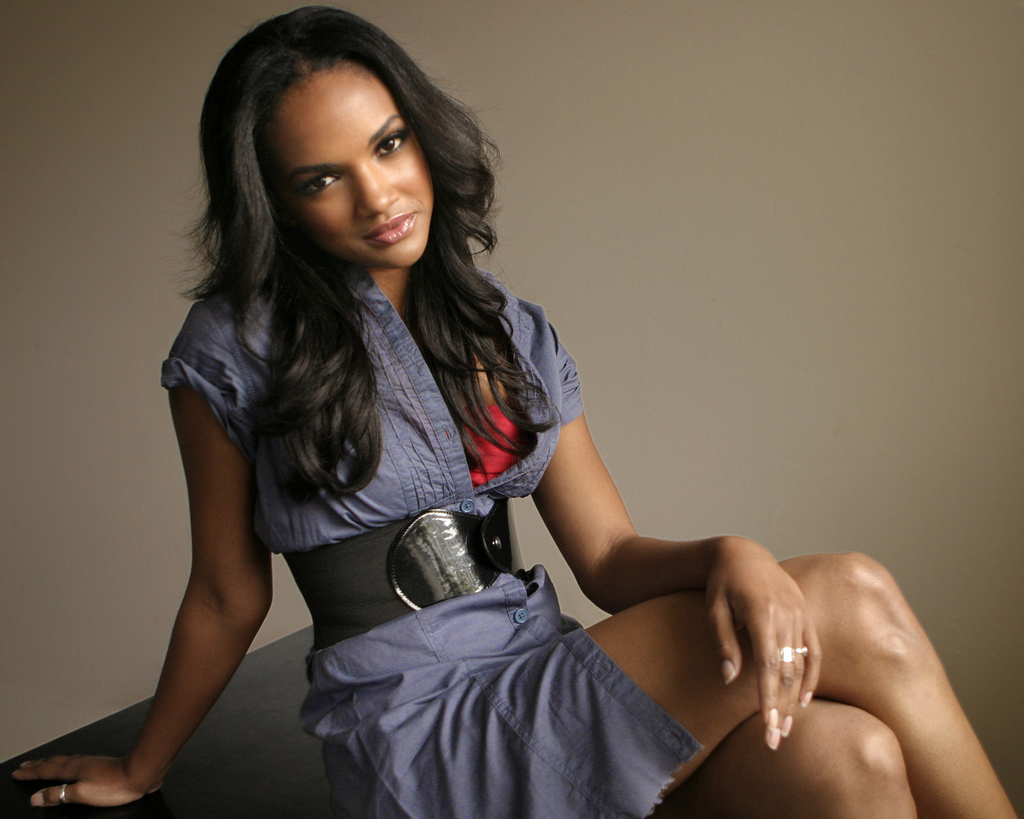
Cox in 2007

Prior to her role on Undercovers, Cox guest-starred in a number of television series. In 2005, she appeared in CSI: NY, and Half & Half, and she appeared in One Tree Hill as Faith in season 3 episode 10 the following year. She also appeared in the romantic comedy-drama Crazy, Stupid, Love., which was released in July 2011.

Cox was one of only two women selected for the 11-member dance group from a field of over 500 for the This Is It concert series. She was one of the featured dancers in the documentary film Michael Jackson's This Is It. She can be seen dancing with Jackson during the rehearsal of "The Way You Make Me Feel".

During the 2009 second season of 90210 she appeared in six episodes. She also appears in the fourth episode of season three (October 4, 2010). Her 20-something character, Sasha, becomes the controversial love interest of Tristan Wilds' 17-year-old character, Dixon Wilson. The character is a DJ who met his character at a pizza parlor and a party she DJed on a yacht. Dixon led her to believe he was her age. One of the things that helped them bond despite his status as a high school junior was that they had the same cell phone ringtone. Eventually, Cox's character lies about becoming pregnant to keep Dixon from breaking up with her.

On October 29, 2009, she was one of the This Is It dancers who appeared on The Ellen DeGeneres Show to fulfill host Ellen DeGeneres' birthday wish.

She appeared in all first-season episodes of the short-lived NBC spy drama Undercovers. She played Lizzy Gilliam, who is the sister of the female lead and who is unaware of her family's involvement in Central Intelligence Agency activities. Originally, Jessica Parker Kennedy was cast in the role, but Cox replaced her in June 2010 before the first episode of the first season was aired in September 2010. Her character is described as "Boy crazy". Cox says that Lizzy's character, which spends much of her onscreen time running the family catering business, embodied much of her own true character and described the character as follows: "Lizzy's a good character; very light-hearted, very fun loving, she’s got a good heart and an interesting past and she’s trying to deal with it".

In 2015, she was cast in the second season of the crime drama Secrets and Lies. In 2016, Cox appeared in the Modern Family episode "The Cover-Up". On August 23, 2016, Cox began a recurring role in the NBC medical drama Chicago Med as Dr. Robyn Charles, an epidemiologist and daughter of the chief of psychiatry Dr. Daniel Charles (Oliver Platt). She played Tiana, known as Sabine under the curse in Hyperion Heights in the seventh and final season of Once Upon a Time. Tiana is regarded as the first African-American Disney Princess. In August 2017, Cox was promoted to a series regular. She appeared in 15 episodes of the season.

In 2019, she began co-starring in the second season of the ABC police procedural drama The Rookie as Detective Nyla Harper, first appearing in the fourth episode of season two named "Warriors and Guardians".

== Personal life ==
On April 28, 2018, Cox married basketball analyst Britt Leach. In December 2018, she gave birth to their daughter. She announced her pregnancy with their second child in January 2022; it was written into her role as Detective Nyla Harper on The Rookie. Cox expressed gratitude for the show's writers doing this. On May 18, 2022, Cox posted a photo of her second daughter on Instagram, giving the baby's date of birth as May 13, 2022. Her second daughter also appeared as her The Rookie’s character’s younger daughter, Leah Murray, in the season 8 of the show.

== Filmography ==
=== Film ===
Year	Title	Role	Notes
2009	Michael Jackson's This Is It	Herself	
2010	I Kissed a Vampire	Nikki No	
2011	Crazy, Stupid, Love.	Hip Hairdresser aka Tiffany	
2012	Battlefield America	Sarah Miller	
2013	The Exchange	Lisa	Short
2013	After Dark	Bree	
2015	The Squeeze	Lana	
2019	If Not Now, When?	Suzanne	

=== Television ===
Year	Title	Role	Notes
1994	My Brother and Me	Myra	Episode: "The Weekend Aunt Helen Came"
2005	CSI: NY	Kia Rowe	Episode: "Dancing with the Fishes"
2005	Half & Half	Alicia	Episode: "The Big State of the Reunion Episode"
2006	One Tree Hill	Faith Banks	Episode: "Brave New World"
2008	Bones	Celeste Cutler	Episode: "Player Under Pressure"
2009–10	90210	Sasha	Recurring Cast: Season 2, Guest: Season 3
2010	Undercovers	Lizzy Gillian	Main Cast
2011	The Mentalist	Tracy Zuniga	Episode: "Strawberries and Cream: Part 1"
2012	Necessary Roughness	Zetty Liston	Recurring Cast: Season 2
2012	Common Law	Destiny	Episode: "Role Play"
2012	Leverage	Katrina Hardt	Episode: "The Frame-Up Job"
2012–14	Key and Peele	Various	Guest Cast: Season 2–4
2013	Mob City	Anya	Recurring Cast
2013–14	Almost Human	Anna	Recurring Cast
2014	Gotham	Dr. Thawson	Episode: "Penguin's Umbrella"
2015	Grey's Anatomy	Blair Vinson	Episode: "Don't Dream It's Over"
2016	Modern Family	Angie	Episode: "The Cover-Up"
2016	Impastor	Jasmine	Recurring Cast: Season 2
2016	Secrets and Lies	Amanda Warner	Main Cast: Season 2
2016–19, 2025	Chicago Med	Dr. Robin Charles	Recurring Cast: Seasons 2–4, Guest: Season 5, Season 10
2017–18	Once Upon a Time	Tiana / Sabine	Main Cast: Season 7
2019–present	The Rookie	Det. Nyla Harper	Main Cast: Season 2–present
2023	Celebrity Family Feud	Herself/Contestant	Episode: "Episode #10.8"
