= Alyssa Diaz =

American film and television actress (born 1985)

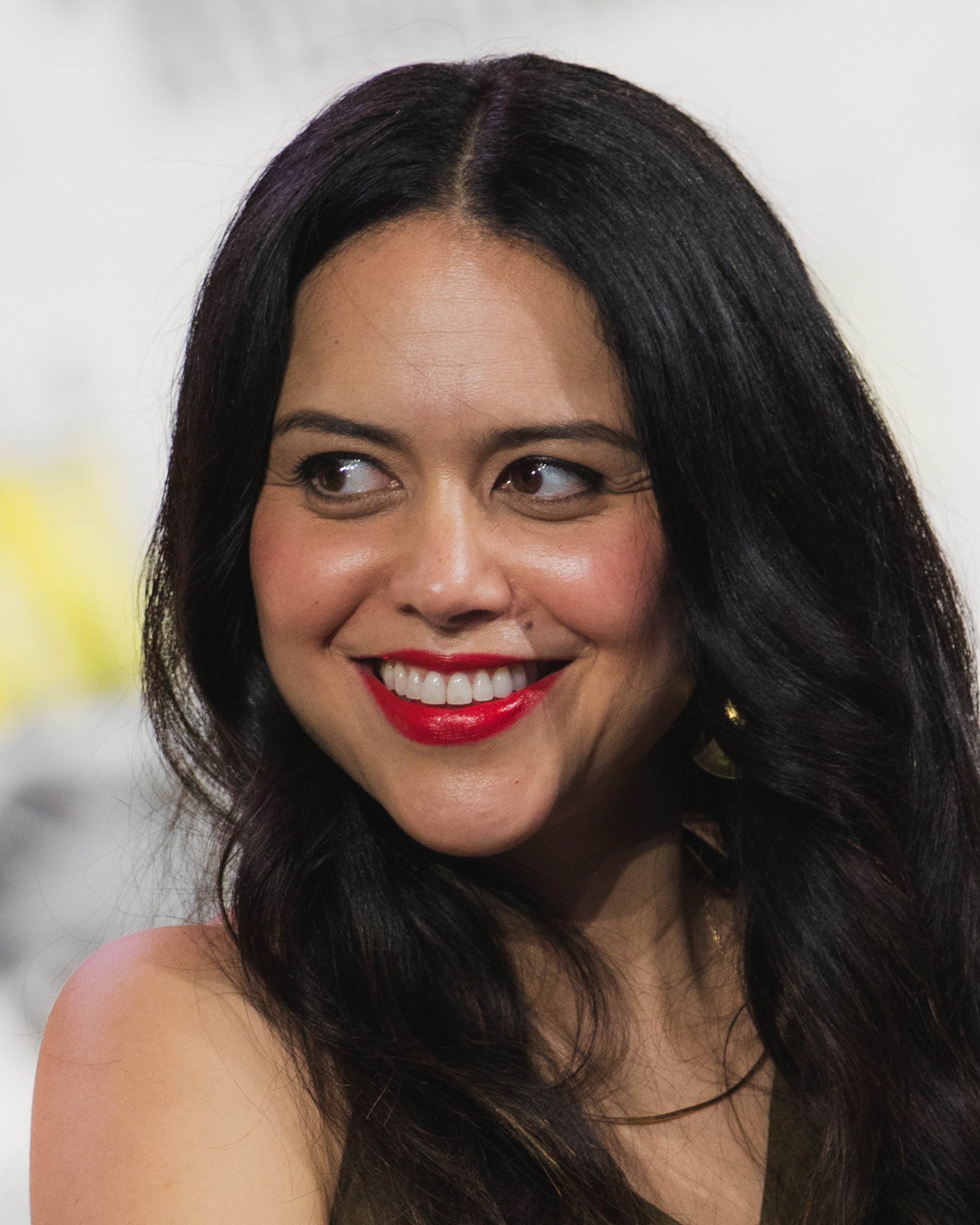
- Diaz in 2026
- Born: Alyssa Elaine Diaz; September 7, 1985 (age 41); Los Angeles, California, U.S.
- Education: Bishop Alemany High School
- Occupation: Actress
- Years active: 2001–present
- Spouse: Gustavo Galindo (2023–present)
- Children: 2

Alyssa Elaine Diaz (born September 7, 1985) is an American actress. She is known for her roles on television, such as Celia Ortega on the CBS daytime soap opera As the World Turns, Jasmine on the ABC Family series The Nine Lives of Chloe King, Gloria Cruz on Lifetime's Army Wives, Teresa on Showtime's Ray Donovan, Dariela Marzan on the CBS series Zoo, and Detective Angela Lopez on the ABC series The Rookie.

== Early life and education ==
Diaz was born in the Northridge neighborhood of Los Angeles, California, on September 7, 1985. She is of Colombian and Mexican parentage. She began acting in the seventh grade when she signed up to do her school's production of Huckleberry Finn.

== Career ==
Diaz is known for her recurring roles on several series, including Army Wives, Ray Donovan, and the soap opera As The World Turns. She had her breakout film role in the remake of Red Dawn. She has made other appearances, guest-starring in television shows, including Southland, CSI: NY, and Lie to Me. She starred in the film How the Garcia Girls Spent Their Summer and in such television films as Ben 10: Alien Swarm and The Jensen Project.

In 2011, she was cast in the starring role of Jasmine on the ABC Family series The Nine Lives of Chloe King. In 2012, she landed the recurring role of Gloria Cruz on Army Wives. She was upgraded to series regular for the seventh season, which started in March 2013. She has also appeared in The Vampire Diaries. In March 2016, Diaz landed the role of Dariela, a series regular, on the CBS drama Zoo for its second season. In 2018, she played Mika Camarena, the wife of Kiki Camarena, slain DEA agent, in the Netflix series Narcos: Mexico. She currently plays a main role in The Rookie as LAPD training officer/detective Angela Lopez on the ABC drama.

== Personal life ==
Diaz married singer/songwriter Gustavo Galindo in November 2023. On December 28, 2020, Diaz announced on her Instagram that they had welcomed their first child. Her pregnancy was written into the storyline of her character Angela Lopez on The Rookie.. Diaz and Galindo welcomed a daughter in 2023, roughly in line with Lopez being pregnant with her second child on The Rookie, but it has not been confirmed that the character's pregnancy was specifically written to mirror Diaz's real-life pregnancy.

== Filmography ==
=== Film ===
Year	Title	Role	Notes
2004	Wednesday Afternoon	Gisella	Short film
2004	Anyone		Short film
2004	Echoes	Jackie	Short film
2005	How the Garcia Girls Spent Their Summer	Rose	
2008	Oh Baby! Avatar	Maria	
2010	The Jensen Project	Samantha	
2011	Shark Night	Maya	
2011	Shark Night Cast: Shark Bite	Herself	Short film
2012	Red Dawn	Julie Goodyear	
2012	American Citizen	Giselle Castellanos	Short film
2015	Other People's Children	Trina	
2018	Parallel	Carmen	
2018	The Way We Weren't	Rita	
2018	Magnetic Plasma for mass(es) Enlightenment	Faith / Lust	Short film
2021	Batman: The Long Halloween, Part Two	Renee Montoya	Direct-to-video; voice role

=== Television ===
Year	Title	Role	Notes
2001	The Brothers García	Marilee	Episode: "Meal Ticket"
2002	American Family	Alicia	Episode: "The Fighting Fridas"
2004	CSI: Miami	Chelsea Lopez	Episode: "Hell Night"
2005	As the World Turns	Celia Ortega	59 episodes
2006	The Unit	Delores	Episode: "Off the Meter"
2008	Shark	Rosa Diaz	Episode: "Leaving Las Vegas"
2008	Greek	Chrissy Snow	Episode: "Three's a Crowd"
2009	CSI: NY	Tracy James	Episode: "She's Not There"
2009–2010	Southland	Mercedes Moretta	2 episodes
2009	Valentine	Wendy Rojas	Episode: "She's Gone"
2009	Three Rivers	Christy	Episode: "Ryan's First Day"
2009	Ben 10: Alien Swarm	Elena Valadis	Television film
2010	Lie to Me	Ava Torres	Episode: "Delinquent"
2010	The Jensen Project	Sam	Television film
2011	The Nine Lives of Chloe King	Jasmine	Main role; 10 episodes
2011	Law & Order: LA	Malia Gomez	Episode: "Westwood"
2011	Necessary Roughness	Tallis Lang	Episode: "Forget Me Not"
2012–2013	Army Wives	Gloria Cruz	Main role (seasons 6–7); 30 episodes
2012	Revolution	Mia Clayton	Episode: "Ties That Bind"
2012	The Vampire Diaries	Kimberly	3 episodes
2013	The Last Ship	Quartermaster Rios	2 episodes
2014	The Bridge	Lucy	3 episodes
2014	Grimm	Belem Hoyos	Episode: "Chupacabra"
2015–2018	Ray Donovan	Teresa	Recurring role (seasons 3–6); 24 episodes
2016	Lucifer	Dani	Episode: "Sweet Kicks"
2016	Bones	Kerry Napoli	Episode: "The Fight in the Fixer"
2016–2017	Zoo	Dariela Marzan	Main role (seasons 2–3)
2016–2019	NCIS: Los Angeles	NCIS Special Agent Jasmine Garcia	3 episodes
2016	How to Get Away with Murder	Dani Alvodar	Episode: "Is Somebody Really Dead?"
2016	Frequency	Miracella Corrado	Episode: "Break, Break, Break "
2016	Lethal Weapon	Hannah	Episode: "Jingle Bell Glock"
2018	Life Sentence	Kayla	3 episodes
2018–present	The Rookie	Angela Lopez	Main role
2018	Narcos: Mexico	Mika Camarena	Main role (season 1)
2022	Ray Donovan: The Movie	Teresa	Television film
2023	The Rookie: Feds	Angela Lopez	Episodes "Day One" and "Standoff"

== See also ==
- List of Colombians
- List of Mexicans
