= The Rookie series 4 =

Fourth series of The Rookie

The Rookie
- Series 4
- Starring: Nathan Fillion; Alyssa Diaz; Richard T. Jones; Tru Valentino; Melissa O'Neil; Eric Winter; Mekia Cox; Shawn Ashmore; Jenna Dewan
- No. of episodes: 22

Release
- Original release: September 26, 2021 – May 15, 2022

Series chronology
- ← Previous; Series 3 Next → Series 5

The fourth season of the American police procedural television series The Rookie premiered on ABC on September 26, 2021, and concluded on May 15, 2022.

The season consists of 22 episodes and continues the story of John Nolan (Nathan Fillion), and his fellow officers at the Los Angeles Police Department's Mid-Wilshire Division.

John Nolan and the rest of the team travel to Guatemala to rescue Lopez and her unborn child. Meanwhile, Sergeant Wade Grey (Richard T. Jones) and Wesley Evers (Shawn Ashmore) work to deal with the consequences. Elsewhere, Nyla Harper (Mekia Cox) takes on a new rookie, Aaron Thorsen (Tru Valentino), while Lucy Chen (Melissa O'Neil) and Tim Bradford (Eric Winter) continue developing their professional and personal relationship.

== Cast ==
- Nathan Fillion as John Nolan
- Alyssa Diaz as Angela Lopez
- Richard T. Jones as Wade Grey
- Tru Valentino as Aaron Thorsen
- Melissa O'Neil as Lucy Chen
- Eric Winter as Tim Bradford
- Mekia Cox as Nyla Harper
- Shawn Ashmore as Wesley Evers
- Jenna Dewan as Bailey Nune

== Episodes ==
No. overall	No. in season	Title	Directed by	Written by	Original release date	Prod. code	U.S. viewers (millions)
55	1	"Life and Death"	Bill Roe	Alexi Hawley	September 26, 2021	401	3.03
In the midst of Lopez's kidnapping, Jackson is killed by La Fiera's men while trying to save her. Grey and Wesley enlist the help of the DEA, but they are bound by the political ramifications of the case. Nolan, Tim and Harper enlist Max, who gives them a helicopter and arms to rescue Lopez, who has been brought to Guatemala. Wesley receives help from a criminal, Elijah Stone, in exchange for future favors before travelling there himself to make a deal with La Fiera. La Fiera threatens to kill Lopez once her baby is born. Nolan and the others resort to their backup plan. Wesley is separated from Lopez as she is brought to the hospital in a staged labor. Tim and Harper ambush La Fiera at the hospital and save Lopez, who shoots La Fiera dead before they escape in the helicopter, avenging Jackson. Nolan saves Wesley from La Fiera's remaining goons. Three months later, Lopez has given birth to her and Wesley's son, who they name Jackson in honor of Jackson West.: Because Titus Makin Jr. left the show after the third season, an uncredited stand-in played Jackson West in the security camera footage of his death.
56	2	"Five Minutes"	Lisa Demaine	Brynn Malone	October 3, 2021	402	3.09
Tim is promoted to Sergeant and leads the roll call as a new rookie, Aaron Thorsen, is handed to Harper. Harper is convinced Aaron does not have what it takes to become a cop, as he is suffering from memories of his trial for having allegedly murdered his roommate in Paris. However, Aaron takes on the courage to be motivated to become a cop, convincing Harper to change her mind. Nolan and Lucy pull over a notorious thief, Claire Ivey, for speeding, and she gives them a clue for an upcoming robbery. The department conduct a stakeout against Claire and her crew and manage to prevent the robbery by disguising themselves as the targeted convoy. Nolan gets the nerve to ask firefighter Bailey Nune out for a date, to which she agrees, but after a night together, she initially breaks up with him. Afterwards, he manages to convince her that she can change and try out a first relationship.
57	3	"In the Line of Fire"	Daniel Willis	Robert Bella	October 10, 2021	403	2.69
Nolan and Lucy respond to a house fire and rescue a man trapped inside. The LAFD discovers a body inside after the fire is put out; an autopsy reveals that he was killed before the fire occurred. While on a break, Nolan, Lucy, Tim, Harper and Webb witness a sniper shooting at a private escort vehicle. The sniper escapes, and Harper and Aaron discover that the sniper has military experience. Nolan and Lucy investigate a suspect pool and question Aidan Merritt, who briefly holds them hostage in his own home before Nolan subdues him. Caught in debt to crime boss Elijah Stone after Lopez's rescue in Guatemala, Wesley is forced to work for him, putting his career at risk. Elijah assigns him to defend Aidan. Lopez investigates the fire and the suspect pool, revealing to Nolan and Bailey that multiple similar fires occurred in Nevada, suggesting a serial killer is on the loose.
58	4	"Red Hot"	Lisa Demaine	Diana Mendez Boucher	October 17, 2021	404	2.83
Lopez returns to work, while Nolan investigates an alleged home dispute where a wife has escaped from her husband's house. Nolan later finds the woman, Linda Charles, walking in an alley, disoriented and speaking a foreign language. The husband and his assistant arrive and pull guns on them as Nolan's suspicions are heightened. All three of them are later revealed to be Russian agents, with Linda Charles, real name Katerina Antonov, having gone rogue. Harper and Aaron investigate a hit and run involving a bike, where the biker was taken away by the driver. Harper tracks the stolen car to a warehouse, where she finds the victim knocked unconscious. As she is about to run after the suspect, the warehouse is caught ablaze, but she manages to escape with the victim. Nolan and Bailey discover a chip that Katerina lost in his patrol car, only for her to hold Bailey hostage. They manage to break up the fight until the FBI arrest Katerina. Lopez concludes that the warehouse fire was caused by the same assailant from the previous episode. Elijah Stone has Aidan Merritt killed after Wesley can't work out a way for him to be released, serving as a last warning to him.
59	5	"A.C.H."	Daniel Willis	Zoe Cheng & Paula Puryear	October 31, 2021	405	2.64
Halloween in Los Angeles has Nolan and Harper detaining a crazed person in a park, in what initially seems like a zombie attack. They learn at the hospital that the woman took a drug, Bomb-X. Lucy assists a neighbor with two ghost hunters who wants to charge her more money than what she can afford. Lopez is handed the case, but the victim, Mrs. Crouch, later decides to drop the case. However, Lopez does learn that the apartment building is in fact haunted. Lucy and Tamara investigate the alleged ghosts that the ghost hunters mentioned, only to discover another neighbour being attacked by a stalker. Lucy manages to stop him. Tim encounters another person affected by Bomb-X. He and Nolan enlist Nolan's half brother, Pete, to wear a wire to buy the drug, and they later catch the supplier. Nolan later helps Pete reconcile with the latter's girlfriend.
60	6	"Poetic Justice"	C. Chi Yoon Chung	Bill Rinier & Natalie Callaghan	November 7, 2021	406	2.72
Tim is tasked by Grey to talk veteran officer Jerry McGrady into retiring, and Tim decides to take Jerry with him on patrol. Nolan, Lucy, and Harper start investigating a treasure hunt, based on a cryptic poem which Nolan and Harper found with a suspect. Tim and Jerry join the hunt, as evidence from an old case worked by Jerry proves to be connected to it. They decipher the poetic clues, which lead them to civilians harming each other, also in the hunt for the treasure. Nolan, Harper, and Lucy track the clues to an old abandoned 1920s subway, and are forced to tackle two men who end up in a brawl. The station bids farewell to Jerry after he announces his retirement himself. Jerry's daughter Ashley hints to Tim that she's interested in him. Nolan, Bailey and Lopez continue the investigation into the previously mentioned serial killer, who Nolan suspects to be Bailey's lieutenant, Fred Mitchell, after he discovers acetone similar to the one used by the killer in his garage, and Bailey searches for evidence in his house. Just as the police arrive with a search warrant, Fred's house explodes.
61	7	"Fire Fight"	Tori Garrett	Corey Miller	November 14, 2021	407	2.59
Bailey is severely injured in the explosion and has to use crutches. Lopez, Nolan, and Harper reopen the serial arson investigation after a colleague of Bailey reveals that Fred was in the hospital in Nevada at the time of the murders. They also conclude that the real killer was trying to frame him. Tim and Lucy investigate several cases of alleged illegal substances used in makeup and skin cream, and one of the rivals reveals that the other is planning to have her husband killed by a hitman. Tim goes in undercover as a hitman and arrests the woman in question after she admits to it. Nolan is captured by the real killer, revealed to be Fred's neighbor, Marcus. Nolan is subjected to a cat-and-mouse chase in an abandoned silo complex, eventually escaping and running Marcus over, arresting him in the process. Wesley continues his dealings for Elijah Stone, notably discrediting a witness. Having reached his limit following a near-beating from Elijah, due to a lack of communication on his part, he eventually comes clean to Lopez.
62	8	"Hit and Run"	Bill Roe	Vincent Angell	December 5, 2021	408	2.78
Lopez asks Wesley to record everything when in contact with Elijah Stone, but he refuses due to client confidentiality and privilege. Nolan and Lopez arrive to talk to "sovereign citizen" Marvin Reynolds, but he shoots at them and escapes, becoming a wanted felon. Tim's sister Genny arrives in Los Angeles to sell their father's house. Harper and Aaron search Marvin's RV, where they discover weapons and a manifesto. Aaron also gives Harper advice when she reveals that her ex-husband wants to move with their daughter to San Francisco, and Harper decides to fight the custody battle for her daughter. The police corner Marvin at the Battleship USS Iowa Museum and eventually shoot him. Tim decides to join Genny in renovating the house, but refuses to visit their father, and also officially endorses Nolan for union representative. Lopez builds a RICO case against Elijah, but learns that Wesley told Grey and that they plan to use Wesley as an informant.
63	9	"Breakdown"	C. Chi-Yoon Chung	Alexi Hawley	December 12, 2021	409	2.66
Tim and Lucy assist his sister, Genny, with refurbishing their childhood home. Tim discovers a gun in a wall, and he and Lucy open an investigation. The gun was suspected to have been used by Tim's father in a botched home invasion 25 years ago. His father had an affair with the neighbor's wife; she later confessed to having shot her husband in self-defense, and Tim's father helped her cover it up. Tim visits his father on his death bed, but still doesn't forgive him. Grey initiates Wesley's wiretapping operation, but his cover is blown by Elijah, who threatens Wesley's family. Sometime later, Elijah and his crew are attacked by a rival gang, which Elijah reveals to be led by La Fiera's security enforcer, Abril. Elijah is arrested shortly afterwards, and Abril warns Lopez not to hunt her down. Nolan has Bailey meet his son Henry for the first time, and considers proposing to her, which Henry approves of. However, as the two are out eating, a man walks up and reveals himself to be Bailey's husband.
64	10	"Heart Beat"	S. J. Main Muñoz	Fredrick Kotto	January 2, 2022	410	2.84
Nolan learns of Bailey's marriage to Jason Wyler, who abused her psychologically and has just been released from prison early for good behavior. A small plane crash on the streets has the precinct staggered when no pilot is found. The plane's owner, billionaire Levi Lincoln, convicted of murdering his wife, turns up alive and having paid another man to serve his prison time for him. Wesley's law license is suspended for six months over his forced dealings with Elijah, but his volunteering legal counsel at the community center takes a troubling turn involving a youth trying to free himself of a drug dealer's grip. Tim asks Lucy's help teaching the dog she gave him to get along with Ashley after their relationship becomes serious. Bailey confronts Jason and demands he make good on his promise to sign off on their divorce at last. Nolan is forced to turn to Oscar to gain information on both Levi and Jason. Nolan and Harper lead the precinct in capturing Levi at a small private airport following a shootout in a hangar. Jason plants drugs in Bailey's car and she is arrested. Nolan promises Bailey he will help set her free before confronting Jason.
65	11	"End Game"	Tori Garrett	Terence Paul Winter	January 9, 2022	411	2.85
Grey authorizes an investigation into Jason, and Nolan turns back to Oscar Hutchinson for further help along the way. Lucy and Tim investigate the murder of an 18 year old girl, Becca, who turns out to have been a friend of Tamara Colins. They learn that Becca had stolen a watch from a man she met on a social media app, and pawned it at a pawn shop. The shopkeeper also gives them the name of the perpetrator, Declan, who in turn was also a friend of Tamara and Becca. Harper discovers she is pregnant with James' child, and she is determined to keep it. Aaron struggles to decide if he wants to shoot a reality program with his mother to give his narrative of Patrick's murder, which he later decides to do. Nolan and Bailey expose Jason's motives to another woman, leading to him turning himself in and cooperating with the police in an undercover mission against the Southern Front. However, Oscar informs Nolan that he pulled a double-cross by informing the criminals about Jason, leading to Jason attempting to flee among the chaos, but eventually being arrested by Nolan.
66	12	"The Knock"	Charissa Sanja- rernsuithikul	Zoe Cheng	January 23, 2022	412	2.83
Nolan is elected as the station's union representative, aiming to accomplish changes, which is met with antagonism from the union president, Lt. Landon Briggs. Lucy and Tim discover a severed hand on the beach, which is identified to have belonged to Mark Klinke, who had managed to get himself to a hospital before dying. He worked for a biotech company, headed by Devin Swaine, who is reluctant to reveal any further information due to confidentiality. His lawyer, in a desperate attempt, tries to seek access to the culprit, Chester Frey's house, which Lopez denies. The police discover that Chester had obtained multiple human arms to test if they could be healed and animated. Tim and Lucy ambush him in the morgue and arrest him. Grey accompanies Italian detective Romeo Cabarelli in a hunt to find wanted fugitive Kai Zullo; however, upon them finding Kai, Romeo fires on him without signs of him pulling a gun. Grey becomes suspicious. Romeo is revealed to be under investigation for misconduct in Italy. Grey, Nolan, and Harper trick him into an arrest of Kai, leading to Romeo's own arrest in addition.
67	13	"Fight or Flight"	Lanre Olabisi	Brynn Malone	January 30, 2022	413	3.19
Nolan and Lucy pursue a stolen police helicopter, which a teen, Leo, stole. Leo refuses to land until they fulfill three quests of his, the first of which includes a known drug house, where they arrest the occupants. The second includes a man connected to his stepfather, who was dealing drugs. Leo's third quest is that he wants them to arrest his stepfather. Grey manages to get the drug dealer to give evidence against Leo's stepfather, who is then arrested. Leo is also arrested once the helicopter runs out of fuel; however, he is released on bail. Tim and Lopez investigate a string of burglaries with ties to a friend of Tim, Des Robinson, who gives up the robbers' identities. However, they find evidence connecting Des to the robbers, before arresting them. Aaron and Harper guard an escaped convict at the hospital, who allegedly killed a cop. Aaron is convinced of his innocence, and calls in James and Wesley to assist. CCTV footage from the prison proves that the convict injured a guard during the riot. Wesley manages to get a lawyer who wants to take the convict's case.
68	14	"Long Shot"	Fernando Sariñana	Natalie Callaghan	February 27, 2022	414	3.67
Skip Tracer Randy arrives at the station to meet Nolan and Harper about a bounty on a notorious Madam, Ivy Flynn, whom he sets out to capture. They roll out on a sting operation, where another bounty hunter, Alicia Kaufman, is about to apprehend Ivy before she escapes amid an argument. Alicia is revealed to be Randy's lover who wants to capture Ivy. A vice investigator tells Nolan and Harper that Ivy had wealthy and powerful clients and received funding from organized crime. At a hotel, they arrest Ivy, but are attacked. Alicia arrives and takes Ivy for herself, but Nolan assists her when they are ambushed. Lopez recommends Wesley for a legal consultant role in a new TV series, but the lead actress' odd behavior puts him on edge. Tim and Lucy look for Jordan Conner, who unleashed rats in the restaurant where she worked after getting fired and burned her ex-boyfriend's car. When they find her, she reveals she had cancer before learning it had gone into remission. Lucy tries to find her biological father, and learns from her aunt Amy that he was one of her mother's therapy patients who she had a relationship with.
69	15	"Hit List"	Robert Bella	Elizabeth Davis Beall	March 6, 2022	415	3.88
Aaron's Plain-Clothes Day gets tough when he and Harper discover his mother's film crew following them. He later encounters the father of Patrick Hayes, the friend whom he was accused of having killed; Aaron is forced to arrest Patrick's father after he tries to punch him, but decides to let him go out of respect. As Grey is heading to court to testify in a case against a mobster, two people are murdered, both of whom are revealed to have been witnesses in the same case Grey is testifying in. He is wounded by a female assassin, who he manages to kill. In a raid, the LAPD uncovers burned documents that points to attorney Kellen Myers, who Lopez learns sold the names of the witnesses and the prosecutors to Mateo Rubio in exchange for money. Kellen also reveals that ADA Sean Del Monte is on the hit list. Del Monte and Chris manage to avoid a second assassin and hold out until officers arrive to apprehend him. Grey contemplates retirement when he awakes in the hospital and soul searches with help from Nolan, returning the favor Grey did him after Nolan's first on-the-job kill.
70	16	"Real Crime"	Rob Seidenglanz	Bill Rinier & Paula Puryear	March 13, 2022	416	3.29
Aaron reality show crew interviews precinct officers about the crime investigation after the show's director, Morris Mackey, is murdered in Aaron's parents' home. Aaron himself is among the suspects. The documentary also brings up the murder of the second half of his father's rap duo, which is still unsolved. Patrick Hayes' father is also questioned, as are Aaron's friends who were with him in Paris. Patrick's case is brought back into the spotlight when the police suspect the murders are connected. Aaron's mother is also revealed to have been in Paris when Patrick was murdered, but reveals she had a sexual fling with a French footballer. The French investigation into the Hayes murder is criticized for its lack of attention to other suspects, one of them being the finance minister's son. The police eventually conclude that Aaron's friend Rowan Clausen committed both murders, having always been the instigator for friend activities and opportunity in order to use the latter to smuggle drugs on Aaron's private plane; Rowan killed Patrick for discovering and threatening to out his smuggling operation, and then Morris for figuring out he was behind the first murder. In the end, Patrick's father asks for forgiveness, which Aaron accepts.
71	17	"Coding"	Bill Roe	Nick Hurwitz & Sylvia Franklin	April 3, 2022	417	3.50
Nolan is first on the scene of a car accident whose lone occupant suffered catastrophic injuries, but is still conscious. He talks with her as she dies. She's an organ donor, so he accompanies her body to the hospital. A teenager is first in line for the victim's heart. Harper is at the same hospital due to potential pregnancy complications. Lucy is scheduled to give a deposition about her kidnapping for additional charges against Rosalind Dyer. Things start going wrong at the hospital because a man hacked the system to put his wife first on the list for a transplant. Officers try to talk him and his wife out of their plan, but fail. Despite instituting contingency plans, patients start dying and the hospital agrees to give the heart to the wife. Nolan lets the other recipient talk to the wife, who changes her mind and backs out of the plot. When the hacker tries to release the hospital, his ransomware partners switch to a pure money demand. The officers find them and upon the two being arrested, the hospital returns to normal. Harper closes an ongoing kidnapping case and after some rough times, Lucy decides not to contribute to the case against Rosalind.
72	18	"Backstabbers"	Tori Garrett	Vincent Angell	April 10, 2022	418	3.53
Nolan and Lucy join forces with Larry "Badger" Macer, who is now working for railway police, in investigating the robbery of a cargo train, where a vase was stolen from a freight car belonging to millionaire William Bloomfield. Together with Lopez and Harper, they learn that William's cellmate stole the vase, but is later found dead in his home. William himself points them towards his own teenaged children: Francis, Danielle and Zachary. Larry deduces that a missing piece of the vase had a bank account number on it, which might have been the motive for the theft. Nolan, Lucy, and Larry return to the train yard after a burning car on the tracks is called in. There they find William's children fighting over the money, with Francis revealed as the killer. Aaron struggles to find his "superpower" while patrolling with Tim. But after talking down a man on parole from visiting his child, Tim notes that his experience from being in jail gives him the ability to sympathize with people who experienced the same. Harper proposes to James, but he becomes uncertain afterwards due to her suddenness. They agree to marry and the wedding is attended by family and friends.
73	19	"Simone"	Liz Friedlander	Alexi Hawley & Terence Paul Winter	April 24, 2022	419	3.95
Nolan and Lucy narrowly escape a bomb at a power station. The FBI is called in when it is suspected that the bomber belongs to a terrorist cell. When the FBI learns that the suspect, Zeke Freemont, has a connection to FBI trainee Simone Clark, they call her in to assist, but she is soon dismissed. Nolan encourages her to stand up for herself. Lead agent Matt Garza calls her in to question Zeke as Zeke only wants to speak to her. He reveals that he built bombs but did not know what they were for. Lopez and Harper investigate a supposed break in at a professor's house, and with Simone's help, discover that it was the same suspect as the bombing, who is later identified as Trevor Gurin, who has a classified connection to Groom Lake. Garza reluctantly takes Simone on to his team. Through map evidence at the suspect's house and the codeword "Enervo", they deduce that Trevor was former military. Trevor steals more bombs from the National Guard's weapon storage, and initiates his plan to take down LA's infrastructure. Note: This episode is a crossover with The Rookie: Feds.
74	20	"Enervo"	Bill Roe	Alexi Hawley & Terence Paul Winter	May 1, 2022	420	4.17
The LAPD and FBI race to stop bombs that have been scattered throughout the city on vans. Deducing that the targets are every freeway, Simone leads herself and Nolan in the direction of one of the trucks and stops it. The police manages to stop all but one of the vans from detonating. Garza and Grey approach the CIA in hope of help, but its leader, Bill August, turns them down, though promises to look into the classified file on Trevor. Tim and Nolan meet one of the former's former associates, Kate Hill, who works for the CIA. She reveals that "Enervo" was a black Ops designed to destabilize foreign cities, headed by Bill and the lead perpetrator being Trevor, whose real name is Ilya Sokorov. Simone follows a lead with the help of Zeke identifying a Russian chocolate bar Ilya had. She confronts him near the aquarium before Nolan arrives. They track Ilya into the aquarium, where he explains that Bill deserted him and his crew and left them for dead, and his acts of terrorism was revenge. Just then, Bill's men arrive and a shootout ensues, but the LAPD and FBI are able to arrest them. Note: This episode is a crossover with The Rookie: Feds.
75	21	"Mother's Day"	Lisa Demaine	Fredrick Kotto & Diana Mendez Boucher	May 8, 2022	421	3.68
Grey expresses support for Nolan's desire to become a TO. They respond to a call at a film set, where a woman explains that another woman, Monica Ditmar, attempted to rob her. Tim and Lucy respond to a robbery, while Lopez and her mother-in-law are robbed. Grey and Nolan set up a boundary for Daniel Tran, a gang informant who is entering witness protection. Del Monte reluctantly allows Daniel to visit his mother, but he escapes protection. As Grey and Nolan find him, they incapacitate two men sent to kill Daniel. Nolan manages to disarm another assassin and save Daniel. Tim and Lucy discover Monica and her boyfriend Jonah Cahill, at a church, where they force forward their own wedding, but as Monica spots them, a shootout occurs. Jonah is injured, while Monica escapes. As Jonah is transferred to a surgery, Lopez lures a disguised Monica to another patient's room before arresting her. Wesley decides to take on a higher position at the DA's office following advice from his mother. Grey later informs Nolan that he will be transferred to a new station due to Nolan angering the union president, forcing him to miss his TO exam.
76	22	"Day in the Hole"	Alexi Hawley	Alexi Hawley	May 15, 2022	422	3.65
Nolan and Bailey travel to the border town of Frontera, where he is to spend his "day in the hole" with local trainee Gabrielle Navar. They arrest a man, Blair Darvill, who asks them to let him go before his gang gets suspicious, but Nolan refuses. Its leader arrives and tries to bribe Nolan, but when he refuses, the gang attacks the station-diner in an attempt to retrieve Blair. With a combined effort with Gabrielle and Ellroy, they defeat the gang and have the survivors arrested as the CHP arrives to assist. In Los Angeles, Lucy investigates the discovery of drugs in Tamara's new car, which turns out to belong to Jake Butler, a doppelganger of Tim. Reluctantly, he agrees to go in undercover to Jake's boss, Roy Hajek, who gives him another mission. Lucy is surprised to discover that Jake's girlfriend is a doppelganger of herself, and is tasked to work with Tim undercover, although they struggle to make an authentic backstory for the two and unexpectedly kiss. Harper approaches Grey and asks to stay on as a detective after her maternal leave, which he accepts and arranges for Aaron to receive a new TO.
