= The Rookie series 5 =

Fifth series of The Rookie

The Rookie
- Series 5
- Starring: Nathan Fillion; Alyssa Diaz; Richard T. Jones; Tru Valentino; Melissa O'Neil; Eric Winter; Mekia Cox; Shawn Ashmore; Jenna Dewan; Lisseth Chavez
- No. of episodes: 22

Release
- Original release: September 25, 2022 – May 2, 2023

Series chronology
- ← Previous; Series 4 Next → Series 6

The fifth season of the American police procedural television series The Rookie premiered on ABC on September 25, 2022, and concluded on May 2, 2023.

The season consists of 22 episodes and continues the story of John Nolan (Nathan Fillion), and his fellow officers at the Los Angeles Police Department's Mid-Wilshire Division.

The series stars Nathan Fillion as John Nolan, alongside Alyssa Diaz, Richard T. Jones, Melissa O'Neil, Eric Winter, Mekia Cox, Shawn Ashmore, Jenna Dewan and Tru Valentino.

The fifth season follows John Nolan as he progresses in his career with the Los Angeles Police Department (LAPD), taking on new responsibilities and preparing to become a training officer.

Nolan eventually becomes a training officer and is assigned rookie police officer Celina Juarez (Lisseth Chavez). Her unconventional approach to policing presents challenges for Nolan as he learns how to mentor and train a new officer.

== Cast ==
- Nathan Fillion as John Nolan
- Alyssa Diaz as Angela Lopez
- Richard T. Jones as Wade Grey
- Tru Valentino as Aaron Thorsen
- Melissa O'Neil as Lucy Chen
- Eric Winter as Tim Bradford
- Mekia Cox as Nyla Harper
- Shawn Ashmore as Wesley Evers
- Jenna Dewan as Bailey Nune
- Lisseth Chavez as Celina Juarez

== Episodes ==
No. overall	No. in season	Title	Directed by	Written by	Original release date	Prod. code	U.S. viewers (millions)
77	1	"Double Down"	Tori Garrett	Alexi Hawley	September 25, 2022	501	3.36
As a reward, Nolan is offered a "Golden Ticket", his choice of assignment in the LAPD. His fellow officers all have suggestions for him but the chief urges him to think it over. While Tim and Lucy continue their undercover assignment with Roy's crew, Nolan and Grey assist with securing the courthouse for the trial of Rosalind Dyer. With the help of her deranged attorney, Rosalind escapes by killing the deputy assigned to guard her. Grey gathers the loved ones of his officers at the station for protection while he, Nolan and Harper help with the manhunt. Tim and Lucy learn of the escape while en route to Las Vegas but Lucy insists on continuing with the assignment. They rendezvous with Lopez and Aaron at a casino and make a plan to take down Roy's crew and their employer, but their cover is blown by an ex of Tim's doppelganger. Lucy manages to subdue and arrest the crew. Nolan decides that he wants to become a TO. Rosalind is able to escape LA after robbing and murdering her attorney's parents as part of a favor and then slitting Chris' wrists in Lucy's apartment, where she and Tim find him.
78	2	"Labor Day"	Rob Seidenglanz	Elizabeth Davis Beall	October 2, 2022	502	2.93
Chris recovers from his injuries. Lucy is offered to go to undercover school, but is hesitant. Nolan passes his TO exam and is scheduled to attend a certification course, and Grey allows him to be Aaron's TO as a trial run. The two respond to a welfare check and discover a deputy sheriff's corpse. The ensuing investigation reveals that the deputy and his colleagues worked undercover against drug dealers, but instead took the cash from the criminals. The deputy left recordings of his interactions with his colleagues proving their corruption. Harper is on maternity leave and is due to give birth, but becomes suspicious of her and James' neighbors. Once gunshots are heard, Smitty arrives and investigates, but does not find any evidence of her claims. Harper later sees the neighbors putting a corpse in a car trunk and reports her suspicions to Grey. The night she is due to give birth, the neighbors break into her house and one of them attacks James as Grey arrives. Harper manages to incapacitate the second man and gives birth to a baby girl. Nolan expresses that he did not feel he taught Aaron much, but Aaron assures Nolan that he helped.
79	3	"Dye Hard"	Bethany Rooney	Natalie Callaghan	October 9, 2022	503	3.12
One month later, Nolan has finished his TO certification, Lucy has finished her undercover course and Harper has returned to work. Nolan is assigned rookie Celina Juarez. A vehicle in a traffic stop has a bloodstained carpet, linked to the disappearance of Jill Baskin, whose case Harper has taken on. With Lopez and Harper, Nolan and Celina follow Jill's suspected abductor Tyler Harvin, but he escapes. While looking through evidence, Celina has a dream about where Jill could be held. Nolan decides to give her a chance, and the two search a property in the woods, where they find Jill. Celina pursues Tyler and fights him before Nolan locates her and arrests Tyler. Lucy is locked inside an old warehouse while conducting a welfare check. She has an epiphany after looking through a document from the Dye Hards, an online group Chris joined looking into Rosalind. After Tim and Aaron find her, she and Chris approach the FBI with the suspicion of Rosalind being a user in the group, which they track to an address in Seattle. Lucy joins the team to the city and find two dead bodies, as well as a message from Rosalind.: Britt Robertson (Laura Stensen) and Felix Solis (Matt Garza) are credited as special guest stars.
80	4	"The Choice"	Bill Roe	Fredrick Kotto	October 16, 2022	504	3.08
While responding to a supposed medical emergency, Bailey falls through the floor of an old house into a tank. Nolan receives a call from Rosalind, who asks him to come and meet her one last time. The tank begins to fill up with water. Harper, Lopez and Aaron investigate a warehouse where an acolyte of Rosalind, Jeffrey Boyle, has stored materials for building booby traps for her victims. They spot Jeffrey and chase him, but he triggers explosives which detonate the warehouse, which they narrowly escape. With notes of how the traps work, the rescue team manage to disarm other traps while activating a last one before Bailey is recovered from the tank. Nolan arrives at Rosalind's meet up location and the two have a last supper before he is meant to kill her in order to save Bailey's life. But living up to his moral, Nolan does not kill her and decides to bring her in. However, as he calls it in, a concealed Jeffrey shoots and kills her. Nolan has a tearful reunion with Bailey as the FBI arrive to take over the case. Note: This episode begins a crossover event that concludes on The Rookie: Feds season 1 episode 4. Britt Robertson (Laura Stenson) and Kevin Zegers (Brendon Acres) are credited as special guest stars. This episode includes the last appearance of Annie Wersching, who died of breast cancer on January 29, 2023, at the age of 45.
81	5	"The Fugitive"	Cherie Nowlan	Diana Mendez Boucher	October 23, 2022	505	3.40
Lopez's mother is attacked by someone claiming one of her sons is "out of time." Harper takes the case, and Lopez calls in her three brothers in L.A. None of them admits to knowledge of their mother's assailant; Lopez later learns one brother, Benny, was in debt after investing money in the stock market and a loan shark came after him. They arrest the loan shark for attacking Lopez's mother. Nolan and Celina respond to a car accident, but the driver escapes from the ambulance upon arriving at the hospital. The driver, Rob Lukasey, killed a woman in a home invasion and was shot by her husband in self-defense. The hospital is put on lockdown as Rob tries to treat himself. He disguises himself as a paramedic and then a doctor before taking Celina hostage; she ultimately subdues him with morphine. While helping at the hospital, Tim is hospitalized with after effects of a previous bullet wound. He has a surgery and successfully recovers, but Ashley breaks up with him. Grey is also hospitalized with food poisoning after eating at a restaurant, leaving Smitty and Lucy in charge of the station with Lucy managing to successfully keep everything running.
82	6	"The Reckoning"	Lanre Olabisi	Leland Jay Anderson	October 30, 2022	506	3.52
Nolan and Celina respond to a money dispute at a bank, which is revealed to have been burned following a robbery. Celina suspects that the money is cursed after a woman from the bank is found dead. Harper and Lopez launch an investigation with a DEA agent after it is revealed that the money once belonged to drug smuggler Winslow Harris. Celina has another dream where she believes Winslow will depart by boat. Together with Nolan and Celina, they apprehend Winslow at the marina. Tim loses his radio while helping a director, who returns it to Lucy. She puts Tim and Aaron out on a hunt for it, before returning it, hoping it would help Tim move on from the breakup with Ashley. Wesley and Del Monte proceed with the case against Elijah, and Wesley is surprised to learn that his ex-girlfriend Monica Stevens is Elijah's defense attorney. She tries to portray Wesley and the LAPD as incompetent and goes out of her way to make the case personal for Wesley. Despite his warnings to her that Elijah is manipulative, she threatens Del Monte into dropping the case. Elijah later meets Wesley outside the office and intimidates him.
83	7	"Crossfire"	Jon Huertas	Glen Mazzara	November 6, 2022	507	3.02
Elijah launches a lawsuit against the LAPD. He also files a restraining order against Wesley and forces him to publicly apologize. Nolan and Celina investigate the murder of doctor Alvin Mitchelsen, who was already dead when he was shot by a former patient. Initially they discover that he was stabbed, but medical examination further adds that he was poisoned. His former patient reveals that she shot Alvin due to his mistreatment of her father's drugs, while his wife reveals he had heart problems before his death. Nolan and Celina deduce this as a cover-up of her actually having killed him with poisoning via drugs. Aaron connects with a young boy, Tabin Cordon, after he and Tim respond to a noise complaint, but Tabin is later revealed to be the brother of Vina Cordon, a member of the a gang led by Shana Quelli, who Harper, Lopez and Lucy are investigating for a murder. Lucy goes in undercover and makes connections with Shana, while Tabin is temporarily reunited with his sister. During debt collecting, Shana alludes to Vina having murdered the victim Harper and Lopez were investigating, and Vina is later arrested while trying to frame Tabin.
84	8	"The Collar"	Robert Bella	Paula Puryear	December 4, 2022	508	3.75
Aaron rides with Harper and Lopez as part of his desire to become a detective. The two give him an old case to solve and limits him to ask them five questions. Nolan and Celina attempt to stop a speeding driver, Pam Winfield, but she is revealed to have a collar around her neck. The police guide Pam to a secure spot and the bomb squad attempts to remove the collar, but it detonates. Tim and Lucy discover another driver, Creighton Mitchell, also wearing a collar. However, he panics and cuts the collar off. Creighton later identifies the assailant as Richard Dormer, a colleague at an oil company they both work for. He also reveals Richard's motives stems from his sister dying in captivity abroad and the company doing nothing. The police arrest Richard at his home. His last target is the company CEO Henri Parsons, who he wants to livestream an apology. The police evacuate the company building and Nolan works to disarm Henri's collar. Henri apologizes, but Celina deduces that Richard wants to see him dead despite the apology; and instructs Nolan to correctly disarm the bomb. Chris proposes house hunting to Lucy, which takes her aback.
85	9	"Take Back"	David McWhirter	Alexi Hawley	December 4, 2022	509	3.65
Grey and his wife visit their daughter Dominique in New York but become concerned when she does not meet them and contact the NYPD, who advise that it is too soon to worry. The couple investigate and learn from her roommate that Dominique has made some possibly dubious new friends. They trace her movements, which lead to an Uber driver who appears helpful but Grey spots his taxi has a broken tail-light, a trick he taught Dominique. They follow him and rescue her from her abductors. Celina fights and apprehends a jewelry store robber, Ryan Davis. Placed in a cell, he is injured in a fight with other prisoners. He later dies in hospital of a ruptured spleen. There is an investigation to determine whether Celina or the prisoners caused his death. Nolan supports her as her union rep during questioning by Wesley and Chris. An autopsy and camera footage proves her innocence. Lucy agonizes and rehearses scenarios with Aaron for her break-up but when the time comes blurts out Tim's blunt advice and asks Chris to "hand in his playbook". Nolan assists Tim's sister, Genny, to recover her lucky-charm bracelet, thrown away by her son Tyler, furious at her divorce. Lucy breaks up with Chris and starts a relationship with Tim.
86	10	"The List"	Robert Bella	Vincent Angell	January 3, 2023	510	4.69
Tim and Lucy go out on their first date, but find themselves tackling a dispute between a cook and chef. While taking out money at a bank, Harper and James find themselves in a middle of a robbery committed by serial robber Todd Shelf and three associates. Harper has an employee trigger the silent alarm and the police arrive. Todd and Roger Armistead escape, but Todd leaves him behind. The FBI are called in, and the LAPD works with Simone Clark (Niecy Nash) and her superior/training FBI Special Agent Carter Hope (James Lesure). They track an unusual money wiring to Taylor Barnes, who reveals he hacked the FBI's undercover agents and informant list to sell to the highest bidder. Taylor is shot by a sniper before he can reveal the buyer's identity. Tim, Lucy, and their reinforcements surround Roger taking a hostage in a neighborhood. Bradford hatches a plan to distract him and Roger is subsequently arrested. At a hospital, Todd's third associate, Amy Wright, escapes and reunites with Todd. They push Tim and Aaron's patrol car off a parking garage roof, but the two narrowly escape. Shortly after, Nolan and Celina find Todd dead in the truck he and Amy stole. Note: This episode begins a crossover event that concludes on The Rookie: Feds season 1 episode 10. Niecy Nash-Betts (Simone Clarke) and James Lesure (Carter Hope) are credited as Special Guest Stars.
87	11	"The Naked and the Dead"	Chi-Yoon Chung	Steph Garcia	January 10, 2023	511	4.03
Lopez is approached by her brother Damian, who asks her to look for a kid, Mateo, gone missing from his local shelter. She and Harper take the case, and learn that Matteo was involved with a gang run by Quinlan Wright. They meet with Nolan and Celina, and search an abandoned building were Matteo's phone last pinged. They discover several bodies, including Matteo's. Harper and Lopez question Moses Warden, Quinlan's rival who denies any wrongdoing. Just then, Quinlan's men arrive and attack the workshop. Lopez and Harper have Damian bring in the gang's informant Ricky, who reveals that Elijah told him to inform the police about a drug bust. Lucy is tasked with hosting the Citizen Academy at the station. She suspects one of the attendees, Kyra Cook, is facing domestic abuse after she raises a question about it. She convinces her to go to a shelter, but she leaves it after an incident with staff. Kyra calls her again when she again faces abuse from her boyfriend Oliver. Lucy arrives at their house and arrests Oliver before Kyra holds her at gunpoint. Lucy manages to talk her down and arrest her.
88	12	"Death Notice"	Tori Garrett	Brynn Malone	January 17, 2023	512	4.78
Oscar Hutchinson has prison leave to donate a kidney to his estranged daughter, but Nolan and Celina have their hands full trying to protect the ever-manipulative Oscar – whom makes constant attempts to delay the procedure so he can stay out of prison longer – from attempts on his life by past victims of his crimes. Lopez has a tense exchange with Harper while investigating one of Elijah's associates before apologizing and admitting the stress of her unexpected pregnancy weighing on her. Tim and Lucy continue struggle to keep their budding romance from interfering with their work, especially when they're assigned to ride together for a single day, until a transfer opportunity arises for each. Ultimately Tim decides to ask for a transfer. Nolan, Celina, Tim, and Lucy end a plot to block Oscar's surgeon from performing his surgery.
89	13	"Daddy Cop"	Anne Renton	Fredrick Kotto	January 24, 2023	513	4.37
A heat wave is causing rolling blackouts across the city, but the precinct has a backup generator. Nolan's trainee Celina misses a question from Sgt. Grey, causing him to be her partner for the day. They foil a robbery in progress, and Grey puts her on command post duty. She is overwhelmed, but the assignment was meant to teach her to ask for help, which she does when she can't get in contact with her mother. When the backup generator at the station fails to come on, Nolan and Aaron discover two people pretending to be cops to try and break a friend out of jail. They rat on a ghost gun seller who Lopez takes down in an undercover operation. The gun seller rolls on a fentanyl dealer processing raw product in a home. Surveillance shows there to be a child in the building. Celina is exposed while rescuing her, but resuscitated by a dose of Narcan. Lucy sets dominoes in motion to get Tim transferred to Metro, back on the street where he belongs. Celina carefully checks in with her mother from the hospital, who thinks she only does desk duty. A side story has most of the cast spending time at Nolan's, who installed a backup generator and has air conditioning.
90	14	"Death Sentence"	Faye Brenner	Diana Mendez Boucher	January 31, 2023	514	4.77
Tim starts work with Metro and experiences some initial setbacks during training, but eventually proves himself and is welcomed to his team. Bailey is in an ambulance that gets shot at, the start of a rage killing spree of firefighters and EMT workers. Nolan finds the perpetrator and arrests a fired firefighter. Wesley loses a routine preliminary decision related to Elijah, which makes him suspect that the judge working the case, Rivas, is on the take. He confronts Judge Rivas, who hints at the truth and then dies mysteriously of a heart attack. Wesley warns Monica that Elijah could be targeting her next. Tamara is working multiple jobs to try and move out of Lucy's place to give Lucy and Tim privacy. The parents at her babysitting gig act strangely, leading to the police investigating the mother's kidnapping due to the father's illegal activity. Tim participates in the rescue as part of Metro. Over the course of his day, Nolan receives calls from his mother, who wants to be paid for staying away from his wedding. He looks away from her "tricks", assuming that a doctor calling him is a fake sent by her, until finally learning that she died in the hospital.
91	15	"The Con"	Bill Roe	Leland Jay Anderson	February 14, 2023	515	4.10
With help from Matthew Garza's team at the FBI, Lopez puts everything on the line to help Elijah Stone take down Abril Rodas in exchange for her safety as part of an elaborate operation. Garza's team moves to utilize Abril's girlfriend Daylin as bait for Elijah. But the night he arrives to execute her, he withdraws at the last minute due to an unintended distraction caused by Aaron. Unbeknown to both the LAPD and FBI, Elijah approaches Abril and offers to work with her. Nolan and Bailey travel to Nolan's mother's now-vacant home in Foxburg, Pennsylvania, and must deal with the secrets and shady dealings his late mother left behind including someone masquerading as Nolan, drug dealers, and a foreclosed mortgage.: Britt Robertson (Laura Stenson), Felix Solis (Matthew Garza) and Kevin Zegers (Brendon Acres) are credited as Special Guest Stars.
92	16	"Exposed"	Ryan Krayser	Paula Puryear	February 21, 2023	516	4.15
The Mid-Wilshire station works with Victorville PD detective Noah Foster to stop a militia group from using sarin gas in a terrorist attack in the city. When a member of the militia turns up dead due to the gas, they bring in his sister for more info, but she plays dumb. However, a tap on her phone reveals that the group is targeting Union Station. A road block with spike strips is set up while Aaron and Harper force the truck with sarin gas towards it. Blocking the truck in, they order the driver out and arrest him. Bailey, Celina, and Harper work with the CDC to secure and quarantine three men returning from Nigeria who are suspected to be exposed to Ebola. Though all of them cooperate, the third forces an entire bus into quarantine due to potential exposure. Lucy detects animosity from Tim, which she learns is due to him learning that she was behind his transfer to Metro. She convinces him that it was the best move, despite not informing him beforehand. Lopez and Wesley increase their residential security by hiring a private security specialist. They receive a Valentine's Day "gift" from Elijah Stone – dead roses crawling with insects.
93	17	"The Enemy Within"	Lanre Olabisi	Vincent Angell	February 28, 2023	517	4.11
Elijah begins to question Monica's loyalty, but is convinced after she forms a plan to double play the LAPD on his trail. She approaches them under the guise of finally helping, but Grey and Harper quickly deduce her play. The second time Monica reports on Elijah's moves, the police manage to decode the real location at the Port of Los Angeles. A shootout ensues and Elijah subdues Harper, but Lopez wounds him and she and Harper arrest him. After Harper allows her to leave, Monica secretly contacts Abril and offers her assistance. Nolan re-opens Celina's sister Blanca's case, and with Celina discovers a new lead which fractures their mother's previous alibi. Nolan learns from a witness, that she and Celina's mother were taking opioids together while Blanca and Celina were left home alone, during which Blanca disappeared. Her mother is eventually brought in for questioning, and admits the truth to Celina. Note: This episode begins a crossover event that concludes on The Rookie: Feds season 1 episode 17.
94	18	"Double Trouble"	Jon Huertas	Caroline Bible & Glen Mazzara	March 21, 2023	518	3.95
Tim's look-alike Jake "Dim" Butler is out of prison, so he and his girlfriend Sava "Juicy" Wu go on a new crime spree. Their plan is to take jobs such as handyman or nanny for a rich and/or famous family, then steal from the family. After an initial score on Lance Bass, they move on to the Baudelaire family with a stash of very expensive and often illegal antiquities in a secret room. Dim goes missing and is later found dead, while the family's nanny is also found dead in their garden house. Mid-Wilshire question one of their previous handymen, who admits that had accidentally killed the nanny. Juicy receives threats from Turkish dealer, who the CIA had connected with an Iranian weapons deal. A video from Dim and Juicy's stolen car leads the police to her friend Lisa Miller, who Dim had an affair with and, when he broke it off, she took a historic gun from the Baudelaires and killed him. Nolan is shot during her arrest, but survived thanks to his bullet-proof vest. The story is told as an in-work documentary, with character interviews interspersing the action.
95	19	"A Hole in the World"	T.K. Shom	Brynn Malone	March 28, 2023	519	4.47
Celina visits her sister Blanca's grave on the anniversary of her abduction. Lopez finds that the abduction fits a pattern of cases dating back years before. Nolan and Celina get a call about a missing girl. An older officer, Joel Chambers, shows up at the scene who Celina recognizes from her case, and he makes Nolan suspicious by asking to enter the scene. Grey asks an old investigator about anything that did not make it into Blanca's kidnapping, which leads the team to a serial sex offender unable to be tied to the case. Harper asks Joel about details in the Juarez case, and he is caught in a lie. They release him with Tim following him, but he flees. Lucy finds a recent case Joel worked on where he cleared a house of squatters just a couple miles from the abduction. The team surrounds the house and talks Joel into letting the girl go, but when the team moves in, Joel raises his gun against Tim, who is forced to shoot him. Lucy offers to help Tim get through the experience, and he offers to help her study for her detective exam.
96	20	"S.T.R."	C. Chi-Yoon Chung	Natalie Callaghan	April 18, 2023	520	3.61
Tim's ex Isabel approaches him, asking for assistance in finding a missing girl, Dara Teska, whom she looked after during a past assignment. Together with Lucy, they determine that Dara went into hiding in a motel Isabel used to bring her to for safety. Upon securing Dara, Isabel and Lucy are forced to reveal their identities in order to help her escape hitman sent by her uncle. After securing her, they learn that her father, Frank, had her uncle killed, and Isabel promises to stay in touch. Grey assigns Aaron to assist Lopez during her day due to her second pregnancy. Harper and Nolan assist Skip Tracer Randy when he stumbles upon a dead body. Randy deduces that a friend of his with prior history has been threatening him through emojis, and he decides to confront him in order for Nolan and Harper to arrest him. Meanwhile, Bailey's friend from college, Libby, is dragging her around L.A. in an attempt to relive their college days, culminating in a meet-up with an untrustworthy man that leads to Bailey's arrest when she gets into a fight with him. Libby decides to return home, but not before accusing Bailey of being an alcoholic.
97	21	"Going Under"	Anne Renton	Alexi Hawley & Brynn Malone	April 25, 2023	521	3.55
Lucy goes undercover as a sales agent in order to gain Frank Teska's interest following his release from prison. Once Frank approaches her, he learns that his brother's crew is after him, while some of his own men have also turned on him. After a drive-by shooting, he determines a close associate was behind it, but Lucy stops Frank from killing him as Tim and the police descend on their location. Frank concedes that he has lost control over his crew after his prison time and wishes to reconcile with his daughter, which Lucy encourages him to do. Aaron assists Lopez with detective work while she is at home, and questions a witness of a robbery, which leads to a vehicle with a dead body and workshop with a deceased suspect. He manages to solve the case in addition to seven other tie-ins. Harper, Nolan and Celina tackle a cold case favor which involves a severed torso. A search recovers an arm belonging to it and two friends of the victim. Video footage in their possession reveals that they accidentally shot their friend while recording a video and tried to cover it up. Note: This episode begins a crossover event that concludes on The Rookie: Feds season 1 episode 21.
98	22	"Under Siege"	Bill Roe	Alexi Hawley	May 2, 2023	522	4.33
Aaron and Celina are ambushed by masked assailants after investigating a suspected disturbance, and are seriously wounded. When hospitalized, Celina recounts a riddle to Nolan said to her by one of the assailants. Mid-Wilshire is put on high alert, and even further when Nolan and Bailey are attacked and Harper's child is temporarily abducted. Lopez works with Wesley and Luna Grey in deducing the riddle. The police look into past run-ins, identifying one with a prior record and finding him dead in his boobytrapped house. They further narrow his possible prison encounters, with Tim and Lucy visiting Luke Moran. An army of masked men with police shields pursue them, but they're swiftly taken out with reinforcements on-scene. With Luke caught and surrounded, he chooses to try to fight back before being shot down. As further reinforcements roll in, an unknown man in a passing vehicle praises how well Luke served as a distraction.
