= The Rookie series 3 =

Third series of The Rookie

The Rookie
- Series 3
- Starring: Nathan Fillion; Alyssa Diaz; Richard T. Jones; Titus Makin Jr.; Melissa O'Neil; Eric Winter; Mekia Cox; Shawn Ashmore
- No. of episodes: 14

Release
- Original release: January 3 – May 16, 2021

Series chronology
- ← Previous; Series 2 Next → Series 4

The third season of the American police procedural television series The Rookie premiered on ABC on January 3, 2021, and concluded on May 16, 2021.

The season consists of 14 episodes and continues the story of John Nolan (Nathan Fillion), and his fellow officers at the Los Angeles Police Department's Mid-Wilshire Division.

The season continues the storylines from the second season, following the aftermath of Nolan's investigation into corrupt detective Nick Armstrong (Harold Perrineau). It also explores police reform, racial discrimination within the police department, new career developments and the personal lives of the officers.

Meanwhile, Angela Lopez is promoted to detective, leaving Jackson West with a new training officer, Doug Stanton (Brandon Routh). However, Jackson soon discovers that Stanton holds discriminatory views and regularly treats him unfairly because of his race. Their increasingly difficult relationship leads Jackson to seek assistance from Sergeant Wade Grey.

Elsewhere, Lucy Chen and Jackson West approach the end of their rookie training. Lucy develops a friendship with Tamara Collins (Dylan Conrique), a homeless teenager who initially steals her car. Their relationship eventually becomes an important part of Lucy's personal life.

Nolan and Nyla Harper are temporarily assigned to a community policing centre as the department attempts to rebuild its relationship with the local community. During this assignment, Harper develops a relationship with community activist James Murray (Arjay Smith).

As the season progresses, Detective Lopez becomes increasingly involved in a dangerous conflict with Guatemalan businesswoman and drug lord Sandra de la Cruz (Camille Guaty).

== Cast ==
- Nathan Fillion as John Nolan
- Alyssa Diaz as Angela Lopez
- Richard T. Jones as Wade Grey
- Titus Makin Jr. as Jackson West
- Melissa O'Neil as Lucy Chen
- Eric Winter as Tim Bradford
- Mekia Cox as Nyla Harper
- Shawn Ashmore as Wesley Evers

== Episodes ==
No. overall	No. in season	Title	Directed by	Written by	Original release date	Prod. code	U.S. viewers (millions)
41	1	"Consequences"	Bill Roe	Alexi Hawley	January 3, 2021	301	3.44
As Nolan finds the stash, Grey asks him to step out of his house but Nolan demands a warrant in order to buy time to hide the stash. He calls Wesley, who finds a positive pregnancy test. Armstrong implicates Harper as an accomplice of Nolan, but Harper explains Armstrong's corruption to Percy and Lopez is able to find Armstrong's go bag off of a tip from Rosalind. Nolan goes undercover to catch Ruben Derian, but his cover is blown when Armstrong escapes and makes a deal with Ruben after getting tipped off by Rosalind. As Armstrong prepares to execute Nolan, the gun he is given is revealed to be empty and the gang members kill him as part of a cover-up; Nolan is able to escape and arrest Ruben. Nolan and Harper both receive letters of reprimand in their personnel files. Nolan will be held in the training program for an additional month and must pass a disciplinary exam, with the reprimand also ruining any chance Nolan has of joining a specialized unit in the LAPD. Lopez receives a promotion to detective and opts to hold off on announcing her pregnancy out of fear that she will be treated differently.
42	2	"In Justice"	Michael Goi	Brynn Malone & Fredrick Kotto	January 10, 2021	302	3.15
As punishment for their part in the Armstrong fiasco, Nolan and Harper are assigned to a community policing center with the hope of rebuilding their station's reputation. While Nolan tries to make a positive impact, Harper has her doubts regarding his methods. Later, Harper bonds with James Murray, a man who works at the community center. Meanwhile, Lucy tries to find the person who stole her car, learning that the thief is a homeless teen named Tamara. Later, Lucy tries to help Tamara upon learning of her situation. Jackson gets off to a rocky start with his new training officer, Doug Stanton, who is revealed to be prejudiced against black people, and Lopez's first case as a detective is a difficult one as someone broke in to use a furnace to cremate a body. She later discovers that the body is one of many burned on the orders of a notorious gang.
43	3	"La Fiera"	Sylvain White	Terence Paul Winter & Natalie Callaghan	January 17, 2021	303	3.76
Nolan's life becomes more difficult when his mother (Frances Fisher) visits him. Distracted, Nolan fails his firearms re-qualification exam, and later stumbles upon a plot to assassinate a businesswoman with shady connections, La Fiera (Camille Guaty), when he returns to practice for the retake. Lopez, Nolan, Tim, Lucy, Jackson, and Doug successfully thwart the assassination. Also, Jackson and Doug continue to exchange blows when Doug opts to arrest an entire family who were not even connected to the crime the suspect that they're looking for committed. Jackson reports Doug to Grey with Tim's backing, but Jackson is outraged when Grey says that Doug will only be assigned to administrative duty. Grey later admits to his wife Luna that he and Jackson need to solve the issue with Doug.
44	4	"Sabotage"	Daniel Willis	Vincent Angell & Diana Mendez Boucher	January 24, 2021	304	3.39
As Grey and Jackson look to shut down Doug, Nolan and Grey are looped into a scam that their family members put money into—instigated by Nolan's troublesome visiting mother. Doug sets up Jackson by making it look like he was going to beat up a kid, but instead writes him up for failing to stay with the evidence after Jackson ran after him. Lopez is shocked when Wesley reveals that he is predisposed to fragile X syndrome, meaning the baby could have it. At the same time, Lopez confronts her supervisor, who she believes is not assigning her cases because of her pregnancy. Her supervisor, who was unaware that she was pregnant, tells her that's not the case, but it doesn't mean that he will be easy on her. Increasingly troubled by his mother's interference in his life and career, Nolan finally forces her to leave permanently.
45	5	"Lockdown"	Anna Mastro	Elizabeth Davis Beall & Robert Bella	February 14, 2021	305	4.08
As Nolan passes his disciplinary exam, he is once again reminded that he has a very little chance of ever getting promoted. He is later held hostage by a man (Josh Stewart) who threatens to blow up the police station unless the release of a dangerous felon happens, but Grey and Harper do not buy it and start to look for the real motive. Jackson and Doug reach a point of no return when Doug threatens to report a fireable offense against Jackson, with Jackson firing back that his father, the head of Internal Affairs, would rip apart Doug's career. Doug sets up Jackson to take a beating in a public housing complex, but it backfires when Jackson activates Doug's body camera, showing that Doug did not intervene in the beating. Doug is placed on suspension. Since he has no chance for a promotion, Nolan sets his sights becoming a training officer, which requires him to complete his degree.
46	6	"Revelations"	C. Chi-Yoon Chung	Corey Miller & Fredrick Kotto	February 21, 2021	307	4.11
Lucy gets a taste of what undercover work is like when she works with Harper and her Fresno PD colleague June Zhang in a narcotics operation, much to Tim's chagrin. Lucy's initial success brings her onboard an operation to take down Aldo Salonga. Nolan's return to school becomes difficult when he is outed as a police officer in his ethics class. After asking for advice from Tim and Harper, he is still unsure if it was a wise decision, and asks his professor, who expresses that one should be open, and that the other students will accept him again. Jackson befriends a mounted police officer, Isaac Young, while working with Smitty at the community policing centre. Tim, while working security at the undercover convention, meets a colleague, Mack Daniels, who appears to have an addiction problem—and an involvement in an extramarital affair. Despite taking firm action on Mack's behalf to help him, his trust with Mack's wife, Beth, sinks.
47	7	"True Crime"	Bill Roe	Alexi Hawley & Zoe Cheng	February 28, 2021	312	3.45
In a true crime documentary, the station breaks down a recent case of a former child actor, Corey Harris (guest star Frankie Muniz), known for his role in the fictional show Paul's Place, who turned into the leader of a cult that Lopez and Jackson had encountered previously. Harper and Nolan initially respond to a call where Corey was reported to have kidnapped a girl by her father; the father convinces her to leave with him. Corey is later reported missing after his house becomes a crime scene, with blood later identified to his former co-star, Charlotte Luster, and a mummified body of Charlie Chaplin is found under his bed. Charlotte is also reported missing, and her car found at LAX. Corey is later found alive, and remains silent for five hours before demanding a lawyer, revealed to be Wesley. Corey's mother is arrested after CCTV shows her parking Charlotte's car. She also confesses to the murder and claims sole responsibility. Corey himself is later murdered during a livestream to his followers, by Ronald Sanchez, a former student of his.
48	8	"Bad Blood"	Sylvain White	Paula Puryear & Bill Rinier	March 28, 2021	306	3.87
Nolan struggles to find the answer to a question he needs in order to take an exam for his ethics class. Lopez, Nolan, and Harper must work with Oscar Hutchinson (Matthew Glave) to find his previously unknown daughter (Molly C. Quinn), who is involved in the kidnapping of a judge's son. Tim looks for the tagger 3Eyez, who spray-painted his squad car as a rookie after the tagger resurfaces from retirement. He later discovers that she only came out of retirement because she wanted to feel young again after breaking up with her husband. Jackson is put in the middle of a debate between Grey and his father when the two argue about what Jackson should do once he completes the officers' field-training program. Jackson decides to accept advice from them both but makes it clear that it is too early for him to decide his career path. Nolan presents his answer to Professor Fiona Ryan, concluding that, based on insufficient information, all the given options would be wrong. She decides to let him take the exam.
49	9	"Amber"	Bill Roe	Brynn Malone & Natalie Callaghan	April 4, 2021	308	3.80
In what is Lucy and Jackson's final day as rookies, the department races against the clock when a newborn is kidnapped from the hospital. Nolan and Harper do a ride-along with Nolan's professor Fiona Ryan, who is working on a book about police reform, and Lopez, who is riding with Jackson on his final day as a rookie, contemplates what her future as a parent holds. She is reassured by Jackson and gets some advice from Harper during the search. The baby's father is later found after he crashes his car, but he is revealed to have never taken the baby. CCTV at the hospital reveal that a woman, Rita Cissane, kidnapped the baby after her own died of SIDS. They later find her on a bridge with the baby, and Nolan and Lopez manage to convince her to give up the baby. As Lucy and Jackson celebrate their last day as rookies, Harper invites Nolan for dinner with her and her daughter to cheer him up.
50	10	"Man of Honor"	Sylvain White	Elizabeth Davis Beall & Diana Mendez Boucher	April 11, 2021	309	3.70
Jackson and Lucy become full-fledged police officers. Jackson celebrates, but Lucy is hurt when her mother tries to get her to abandon her "thankless job". Ben comes to visit Nolan and reveals that Henry now works for him, which means he has dropped out of college. Harper feels awkward when she sees someone from her past. Tim assists Lopez with preparations for her and Wesley's wedding, and assures her to plan her own wedding the way she wants it. She later has him take over as her man of honor. Nolan responds to a call where a man is holding people hostage. He has the situation well in hand, but a nervous security guard shoots and kills the man. He later continues the investigation into the case with Harper's help. They discover that the man's family were disturbed by robbers who forced him to pay back, prompting him to rob a bank. His wife and daughter are abducted and the assailants force the wife to steal from her workplace. Nolan assists her while Harper causes a distraction, giving Lucy and Jackson enough time to find the daughter.
51	11	"New Blood"	Bill Roe	Corey Miller & Zoe Cheng	April 18, 2021	310	3.81
Nolan watches over Fiona, after threats escalate from a brick through her car window and harassing messages to a shootout with white supremacists in the middle of a street in broad daylight. As the new rookies arrive, one named Larry "the Badger" Macer—who fawned over Nolan, saying Nolan's academy success inspired him in turn—accidentally fires his gun, which ends his police career before it begins. Lucy becomes jealous of the way Tim treats the second rookie, Katie Barnes, a female former soldier who he tries to help readjust back to civilian life. Katie resigns at the end of the day, saying she needs to find her way. Tim assists Lopez and Wesley in planning their wedding, acting as a third party when Wesley's mother comes over to look over the plans. She later reconciles with Lopez and urges her to plan her wedding the way she wants it. Henry returns to Los Angeles to begin his new job, with Nolan struggling to be supportive of his son's choice to leave school. He becomes more accepting of his son's decision after a talk with Fiona, but then Henry collapses at dinner.
52	12	"Brave Heart"	Lisa Demaine	Vincent Angell & Paula Puryear	May 2, 2021	311	4.00
Henry is rushed to the hospital following his collapse. He tells his parents that he wants the more dangerous long-term surgery, then has a heart attack before he can tell the doctor. Nolan chooses the long-term option, and the gamble is successful. La Fiera has taken her injured son, Diego, to the same hospital, but the police soon realize she is actually there to negotiate an agreement with a major drug dealer, Tomás Madrigal, who is close to death and knows his son Cesar is incapable of running the business. Harper surreptitiously records the conversation. Lopez unsuccessfully confronts La Fiera twice, trying to warn her off. Billie, an addict slightly injured when arrested by Jackson and Lucy, is made to admit she is a drug mule carrying MDMA in her stomach and is offered a deal. When a condom bursts, she is taken for surgery. Cesar has Diego assassinated in the underground parking garage at the hospital, but La Fiera is protected by Lopez in the ensuing gunfight. After La Fiera grieves over her son, Grey realizes a drug war is coming. Mack has been reduced to temporary security work for the Madrigals, and Tim offers support for his addiction.
53	13	"Triple Duty"	Bill Johnson	Teleplay by : Natalie Callaghan & Zoe Cheng & Paula Puryear; Story by : Bill Rinier	May 9, 2021	313	3.91
La Fiera starts her war by massacring Cesar's men at a drug deal but comes to the attention of a DEA task force. Lopez negotiates with her to cease hostilities in exchange for Harper's hospital tape, which will convince Cesar's lieutenants of the agreement's validity. Tim and Nolan stakeout Cesar's girlfriend's house and prevent La Fiera's men from killing her baby as revenge for Diego's murder. DEA agent Taggert tries to belittle Lopez. He obtains the tape over her head and has Lopez deliver it on a USB stick, but La Fiera sees through his stratagem of including surveillance malware on the stick. The war highlights a need for undercover work so Harper puts Lucy though a series of intense tests: a social gathering with "criminals", a drug-cooking session, and a phony attempted kidnapping. Offered a last chance to pull out, Lucy remains determined to go undercover. Jackson learns Doug is still on the force and has not changed. He threatens to go public even though Grey thinks it may cost Jackson his career. Instead they improvise, having Doug's watch commander use the body-cam footage from the assault on Jackson as a "retraining" video to expose Doug to his colleagues; Jackson grimly remarks that this is the real Doug Stanton.
54	14	"Threshold"	Lisa Demaine	Alexi Hawley	May 16, 2021	314	3.77
The LAPD plan to make Cesar Madrigal an informant against La Fiera, and Nolan approaches Cesar's girlfriend about persuading him to talk. However, as Nolan and Smitty locate Cesar, he is assassinated. Later, on patrol, they chase a shoplifter who, after being arrested, is charged with assault instead of a misdemeanor, on the grounds that Nolan had accidentally dislocated his own finger during the pursuit. Nolan brings Fiona into the case and manages to get Grey's backing to force ADA Sean Del Monte to reduce the charge. Lucy starts her undercover work in a rundown motel and is grabbed by Aldo Salonga's brother Dahrio, who forces her to participate in a robbery to obtain ingredients for the drugs he wants her to cook. Her work is interrupted when La Fiera storms Dahrio's compound to force him to join her cartel but the police, alerted by Harper, arrive to arrest the gang. Lopez tells La Fiera that she has only herself to blame for her son's death. La Fiera later escapes out from her prisoner transport, and as Wesley and Lopez's wedding ceremony begins, Nolan enters the room and discovers Lopez's bracelet on the floor with Lopez herself missing.
