= Crutch (disambiguation) =

A crutch is a mobility aid that transfers weight from the legs to the upper body.

Crutch may also refer to:

- Crutch (film), a 2004 American film directed by Rob Moretti
- Crutch (TV series), a 2025 television series starring Tracy Morgan
- Aletheian, formerly Crutch, an American metal band
- Crutch, Worcestershire, a former extra-parochial place in Halfshire, a medieval hundred of Worcestershire, UK
- Crutches, also known as filler (linguistics) involved in turn-talking.
- The Crutch, a col on a ridge on the shore of Cumberland West Bay, South Georgia
- Crutch, in smoking, a type of mouthpiece for a roach
- Crutch, an adjustable handrest on a bassoon
- "Crutch", a 2000 song by Matchbox Twenty from Mad Season

== See also ==
- Crutching, in sheep husbandry, a hygienic shearing practice
