= Yuri Sardarov =

American actor and producer

- Born: January 28, 1988 (age 38); Baku, Azerbaijan SSR, Soviet Union
- Education: University of Michigan
- Occupations: Actor, producer
- Years active: 2008–present

Yuri Sardarov, a.k.a. Yuriy Sardarov, (born January 28, 1988) is an American actor and producer. He has done extensive work in the theater. He starred on NBC's Chicago Fire, seasons 1 through 8.

== Early life ==
Yuri Sardarov is half-Georgian and half-Armenian; he moved to the United States at age two as a refugee. His parents and grandparents were musicians. Sardarov was named after his grandfather, with whom he is very close, and they have matching Cyrillic tattoos. Because his grandfather was named "Yuri," Sardarov began to spell his name with an extra "y" at the end to differentiate himself. He has a brother, Nick, who is eleven years younger. Sardarov attended Glenbrook North High School, near Chicago, starting his junior year. He graduated in 2006. In 2010 he graduated with a BFA in Theatre Performance at the University of Michigan School of Music, Theatre & Dance where he was in a fraternity.

== Personal life ==
He divides his time between Los Angeles and Chicago. During filming for Chicago Fire, he lived with his costars Joe Minoso and Charlie Barnett. He has a partner, Madeleine. Sardarov enjoys comedy and took classes at The Second City during his free time in Chicago.

== Filmography ==
=== Television ===
Year	Title	Role	Notes
2012–2019	Chicago Fire	Brian "Otis" Zvonecek	Main role
2013	Apex	Phillip	Also executive producer
2014	Chicago P.D.	Brian "Otis" Zvonecek	Minor role
2018	Chicago Med	Brian "Otis" Zvonecek	Season 4; Episode 2: "When to Let Go"
2022	The Rookie	Ilya Sokurov	2 Episodes: Simone/Enervo
2023	FBI: International	Sergei Diatchenko	Guest Star: "Blood Feud"; as Yuriy Sadarov

=== Film ===
Year	Title	Role	Notes
2011	The Double	Leo	As Yuriy Sardarov
2011	The Ides of March	Mike	As Yuriy Sardarov
2011	S.W.A.T.: Firefight	Bulgarian Man/Mr. Krav	As Yuriy Sardarov
2012	Argo	Rossi	As Yuriy Sardarov
2020	Adam	Nick Khan	

=== Shorts ===
Year	Title	Role	Notes
2008	Agoraphobia at 2530 Brian Dr.	Me	As Yuriy Sardarov, also a producer
2008	Dupe		As Yuriy Sardarov
2010	Student Housing: Zombie Edition	Counselor	As Yuriy Sardarov
2010	Lift Gate	Isaac	As Yuriy Sardarov, also a producer
2011	Shark Tank	Cree	As Yuriy Sardarov
