= The Dog Problem (play) =

Play by David Rabe

The Dog Problem is a play by David Rabe that premiered, May 6, 2001, in New York City at the Atlantic Theater Company.

The cast included Joe Pacheco as Ronnie, Larry Clarke as Ray, David Wike as Joey, Victor Argo as Uncle Malvolio, Tony Cucci as Tommy Stones, Andrea Gabriel as Teresa, Robert Bella as Priest, and Buddy as The Dog. The Creative team included: Director: Scott Ellis, producer Noel Ashman, Costumes: Michael Krass, Lighting: Brian Nason, Sets: Allen Moyer, Sound: Eileen Tague, Fight Direction: Rick Sordelet.

== History ==
The first version of the play premiered at the Williamstown Theater Festival in the summer of 1998 as a one-act play entitled Corners. The cast included Joe Pacheco as Ronnie, Robert Pastorelli as Ray, Christopher Meloni as Joey, Victor Argo as Uncle Malvolio, Ty Burrell as Tommy Stones, and Kathryn Hahn as Theresa. The production team included Scott Ellis (director), Allen Moyer (set design), Brian Nason (lights), Eilenn Hague (sound), and Constance Hoffman (costumes).

An expanded version of Corners premiered in 2000 at the Long Wharf Theatre (Stage 2) under the name The Dog Problem. Scott Ellis directed that production and the cast included Joe Pacheco as Ronnie, Larry Clarke as Ray, David Wike as Joey, Victor Argo as Uncle Malvolio, Andrea Gabriel as Theresa, Michael Kell as Priest, and Ed Lemert as The Dog.
