= Adam (2020 film) =

- Directed by: Michael Uppendahl
- Written by: Michael Burke; Brett Johnson; Robin Veith; Mike Young
- Produced by: Gary Gilbert; Jordan Horowitz
- Starring: Aaron Paul; Jeff Daniels; Tom Berenger
- Cinematography: Tobias Datum
- Edited by: Joseph Talbot
- Release date: May 19, 2020 (iTunes)
- Running time: 100 minutes
- Country: United States
- Language: English

Adam (also known as Grounded, and Quad) is a 2020 American drama film starring Aaron Paul, Jeff Daniels and Tom Berenger.

Filming took place in Detroit in 2010, but the film was not released until 2020.

== Plot ==
Adam Niskar (Aaron Paul) is a hardworking mortgage broker who appears to have it all — a successful career, a supportive family, and close friends. His seemingly perfect life takes a dramatic turn when his boss (Jeff Daniels) offers him a big promotion at work. Caught up in the excitement and under the influence of alcohol, Adam suffers a tragic diving accident that leaves him a quadriplegic.

Struggling to accept his new reality, Adam becomes consumed by anger and despair, believing his life to be over. His relationships begin to deteriorate as he wrestles with his physical limitations and emotional pain. Everything changes when he meets Yevgenia (Lena Olin), a spirited and outspoken Russian nurse who challenges his outlook on life. Through her tough love and support, Adam gradually learns to find hope, rediscover his sense of purpose, and realise that his life is far from over — it has only just begun.

== Cast ==
- Aaron Paul as Adam Niskar
- Jeff Daniels as Mickey
- Tom Berenger as Jerry
- Lena Olin as Yevgenia
- Tom Sizemore as "Lucky"
- Shannon Lucio as Christine
- Michael Weston as Ross
- Stephanie Koenig as Brandy
- Celia Weston as Arlene
- Yuri Sardarov as Nick Khan
- Paul Walter Hauser as Trent
