= Colin Fitz Lives! =

1997 independent film

- Directed by: Robert Bella
- Written by: Tom Morrissey
- Produced by: Robert Bella
- Starring: John C. McGinley; Matt McGrath; William H. Macy; Andy Fowle; Julianne Phillips; Martha Plimpton; Mary McCormack; Chris Bauer
- Music by: Jason Downs (Original Music) Matthew Puckett (Original Music)
- Distributed by: IFC Films
- Release date: 1997
- Running time: 87 minutes
- Country: United States
- Language: English

Colin Fitz Lives!, also known simply as Colin Fitz is a 1997 independent film directed by Robert Bella. Colin Fitz Lives! was shot on 35mm in New York City. The budget was $150,000 and the film was shot in 14 days. It had its world premiere in Dramatic Competition at the 1997 Sundance Film Festival. The film won awards at several film festivals, including the Austin Film Festival and the Long Island Film Festival. However, it did not receive theatrical distribution, as Bella lacked the funds to finish the film's post-production, pay deferred salaries, and secure music rights for more than a decade after the festival.

In August 2010, IFC Films released a newly remastered version of the film as part of its Video On Demand platform.

== Plot ==
On the anniversary of a famous rock star's death, security guards Paul (Matt McGrath) and Grady (Andy Fowle) must try to protect his grave, where a group of his fanatical admirers had killed themselves the year before.

== Cast ==
- John C. McGinley as Groundskeeper
- Matt McGrath as Paul
- William H. Macy as Mr. O'Day
- Andy Fowle as Grady
- Julianne Phillips as Justice Fitz
- Robert Bella as Pepe
- Will McCormack as Todd
- Erik Jensen as Dean
- Martha Plimpton as Ann
- Mary McCormack as Moira
- Chris Bauer as Tony Baby Shark
- Casper Andreas as Mats (as Casper Andreasson)
- Toni Pearen as Pandemonium Fan
- Kristen Johnston as Stalker Fan

== Awards and nominations ==
- Sundance Film Festival
  - Nominated, 1997, Grand Jury Prize for Dramatic (Robert Bella)
- Austin Film Festival
  - Nominated, 1997, Feature Film Award (Tom Morrissey (writer)/Robert Bella (director))
  - Won, 1997, Feature Film Award for Cinematography (Henry Cline)
  - Won, 1997, Feature Film Award for Best Feature (Robert Bella)
  - Won, 1997, Audience Award (Robert Bella)
- Florida Film Festival
  - Nominated, 1997, Grand Jury Award for Narrative (Robert Bella)
- Long Island Film Festival
  - Won, 1997, Best of Fest (Robert Bella)
- WorldFest Houston awards
  - Won, 1997, Gold Award for Comedy (Robert Bella)

== Reception ==
On the review aggregator Rotten Tomatoes, the film has only 2 reviews, both positive. Prairie Miller of NewsBlaze praises the characters and "goof chemistry", while Mark R. Leeper of Leeper's Reviews admires the focus on the screenplay.
