= Frankie Faison =

American actor (born 1949)

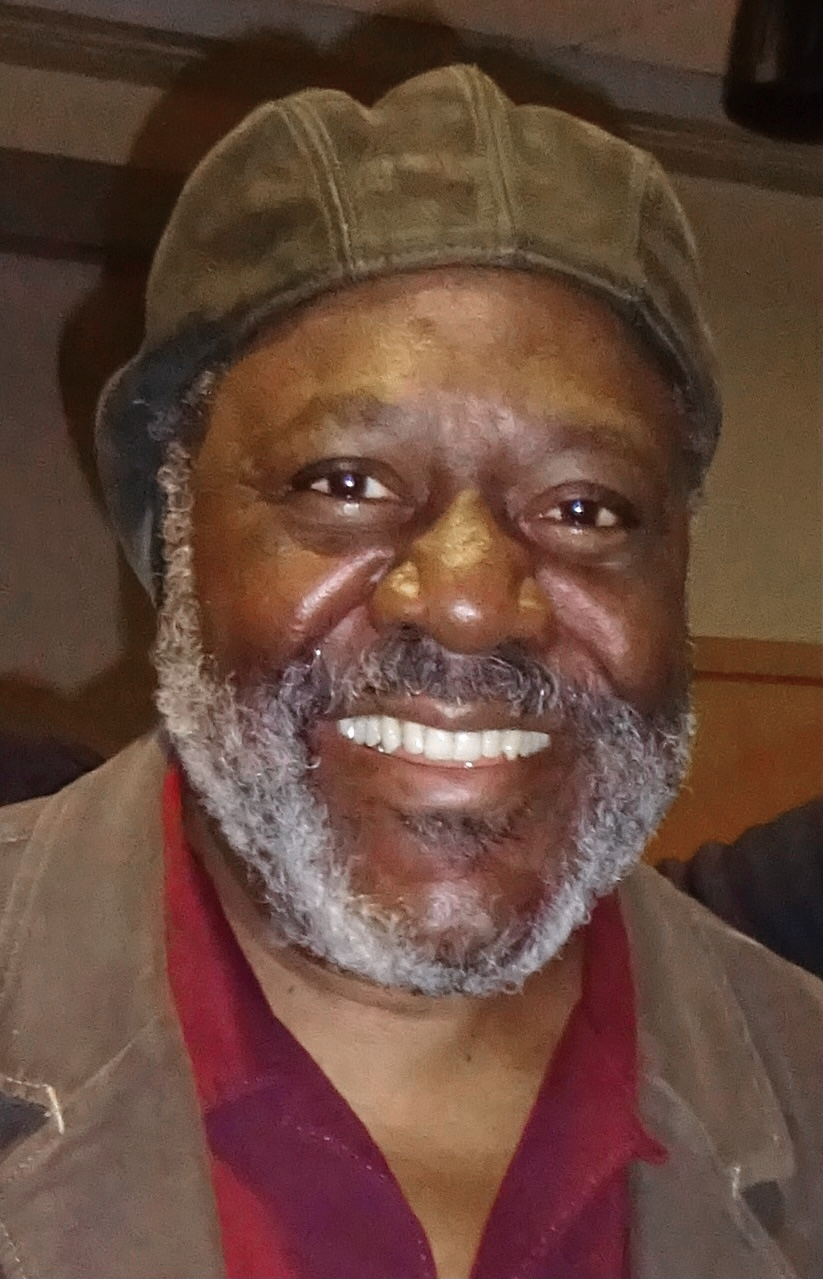
- Faison in 2016
- Born: Frankie Russel Faison; June 10, 1949 (age 77); Newport News, Virginia, U.S.
- Education: Illinois Wesleyan University (BA); New York University (MFA)
- Occupation: Actor
- Years active: 1974–present
- Spouse: Samantha Jupiter Faison
- Children: 3

Frankie Russel Faison (born June 10, 1949) is an American actor known for his role as Commissioner Ervin Burrell in the HBO series The Wire, as Barney Matthews in the Hannibal Lecter franchise, and as Sugar Bates in the Cinemax series Banshee.

== Early life and education ==
Faison was born in Newport News, Virginia, the son of Carmena (née Gantt) and Edgar Faison. He studied drama at Illinois Wesleyan University in Bloomington, Illinois, where he joined Theta Chi fraternity. He went on to obtain a Master of Fine Arts degree from New York University's Tisch School of the Arts, graduating in 1974. Frankie has been married to Samantha Jupiter Faison since 2017.

== Career ==
Faison started his acting career in 1974 in the New York Shakespeare Festival production of King Lear, with James Earl Jones in the title role. Faison later appeared opposite Jones in the Broadway premiere of Fences, for which he received a nomination for a Tony Award for Best Featured Actor in a Play. Faison's next role came in TV, in the short-lived series Hot Hero Sandwich in 1979. Faison did not make it to the big screen until 1980, when he appeared in Permanent Vacation as "Man in Lobby". A string of small roles followed until 1986, when he played the part of Lt. Fisk in Manhunter. Also that year, he appeared in the comedy The Money Pit, as an unruly construction worker, and in the Stephen King film Maximum Overdrive. In 1988, he appeared alongside Eddie Murphy and James Earl Jones in Coming to America in the role of a landlord, and won a minor role in the 1989 Spike Lee film Do the Right Thing. Faison also appeared in 1996's The Rich Man's Wife as Detective Ron Lewis. He also appeared in the 1999 remake of The Thomas Crown Affair as Detective Paretti. Faison is notable for being the most frequent actor to appear in adaptations of Thomas Harris' Hannibal books: along with Manhunter, he also appeared as Lecter's jailer Barney in The Silence of the Lambs, the sequel Hannibal, and the prequel Red Dragon.

During the 1990–1991 season, he starred in the Fox situation comedy True Colors with Stephanie Faracy and Nancy Walker about an interracial couple. He was replaced by Cleavon Little for the second season of the program. In 1991, Faison again appeared alongside Hopkins in the film Freejack, which also starred Mick Jagger and Maximum Overdrive co-star Emilio Estevez. In 1998, he was a regular on the science-fiction TV show Prey. In 1992, he played the patriarch Bailey in the Cheryl West play Before It Hits Home. In the 2003 film Gods and Generals, Faison played the role of Jim Lewis, a freed slave, who shares his religious faith and optimism with CSA General Thomas J. "Stonewall" Jackson as the general's personal cook. In 2004, he starred as JoJo Anderson in The Cookout and appeared in White Chicks. Faison had a starring role as the Baltimore City Police Commissioner Ervin Burrell on the HBO drama The Wire.

Faison appeared in Tyler Perry's Meet the Browns, a movie about a single mom who takes her family to Georgia for the funeral of her father—a man she never met. There, her clan is introduced to the crass, fun-loving Brown family. Faison played the role of Brown and Vera's brother, L.B. Brown. In 2009, he was in the ensemble cast of John Krasinski's adaptation of Brief Interviews With Hideous Men playing the son of a toilet attendant who caustically recounts his father's experiences in one of the titular monologues.

Faison played Richard Evans on One Life to Live from 2009 through 2012.

He appeared in episodes of Blue Bloods, which also stars Tom Selleck, as an assistant police commissioner. His main film role in this period was as Harlan in the film Adam. He also appeared in a third-season episode of Lie to Me.

Faison played the role of Sugar Bates, a prizefighter turned tavernkeeper, on the Cinemax program Banshee. He appeared as Henry "Pop" Hunter in the Netflix series Luke Cage, and played a supporting role in the 2016 Amazon Studios original special An American Girl Story – Melody 1963: Love Has to Win.

In 2017, Faison appeared in the music video for "Holding On" by The War on Drugs, from their fourth album A Deeper Understanding.

== Filmography ==
=== Film ===
Year	Title	Role	Notes
1980	Permanent Vacation	Man in Lobby	
1981	Ragtime	Gang Member No. 1	
1982	Cat People	Detective Brandt	
1982	A Little Sex	Electrician	
1982	Hanky Panky	Cop Driver	
1984	C.H.U.D.	Sergeant Parker	
1984	Exterminator 2	Be Gee	
1986	The Money Pit	James	
1986	Maximum Overdrive	Handy	
1986	Manhunter	Lieutenant Fisk	
1988	Coming to America	Mr. Townsend	
1988	Mississippi Burning	Eulogist	
1989	Do the Right Thing	Coconut Sid	
1990	Betsy's Wedding	Zack Monroe	
1991	The Silence of the Lambs	Barney Matthews	
1991	City of Hope	Levonne	
1992	Freejack	Eagle Man	
1993	Sommersby	Joseph	
1993	Money for Nothing	Madigan	
1994	Heading Home	Horace Jones	
1994	I Love Trouble	Police Chief	
1995	Roommates	Professor Martin	
1996	The Stupids	The Lloyd	
1996	Mother Night	Robert Sterling Wilson	
1996	Albino Alligator	Agent Marv Rose	
1996	The Rich Man's Wife	Detective Ron Lewis	
1997	Julian Po	Sheriff Leon	
1998	Jaded	Henry Broker	
1999	The Thomas Crown Affair	Detective Paretti	
1999	A Little Inside	Tom Donner	
1999	Oxygen	Phil Kline	
1999	Orson Welles Sells His Soul to the Devil	Carter	Short subject
2000	Where the Money Is	Security Guard	
2001	Gina, an Actress, Age 29	Albert	Short subject
2001	The Sleepy Time Gal	Jimmy Dupree	
2001	Hannibal	Barney Matthews	
2001	Down to Earth	Whitney Daniels	
2001	Thirteen Conversations About One Thing	Richard 'Dick' Lacey	
2002	Showtime	Captain Winship	
2002	Red Dragon	Barney Matthews	
2003	Gods and Generals	Jim Lewis	
2004	Highwaymen	Will Macklin	
2004	America Brown	Coach Bryant	
2004	White Chicks	Chief Elliott Gordon	
2004	Messengers	Tom Mabry	
2004	The Cookout	Jojo Andersen	
2004	Crutch	Jerry	
2004	In Good Company	Corwin	
2006	Premium	Phil	
2007	My Blueberry Nights	Travis	
2008	Meet the Browns	L.B.	
2008	Nick & Norah's Infinite Playlist	Ticket Salesman	
2009	Brief Interviews with Hideous Men	Subject #42	
2009	Adam	Harlan	
2009	Splinterheads	Pope	
2009	Cirque du Freak: The Vampire's Assistant	Rhamus Twobellies	
2009	For Sale by Owner	Gene Woodman	
2009	Breaking Point	Judge Green	
2011	Mayor Cupcake	Lenny Davis	
2011	The Cookout 2	Jojo Anderson	
2012	Cowgirls 'n Angels	Augustus	
2013	Tio Papi	Gilly	
2013	Danger Word	Grandpa Joe	Short subject
2014	Clipped Wings, They Do Fly	Mayor Goode	
2014	Assumption of Risk	Dr. Paulson	
2014	Away from Here	Carl	
2016	An American Girl Story – Melody 1963: Love Has to Win	Frank Ellison	
2016	Smoke Filled Lungs	Stanley	
2017	The Case for Christ	Joe Dubois	
2017	The Sounding	Roland	
2018	An Actor Prepares	Deacon Frank Dodge	
2019	The Killing of Kenneth Chamberlain	Kenneth Chamberlain Sr.	
2020	The Grudge	William Matheson	
2020	I'm Your Woman	Art	
2021	Fatherhood	Mike	
2022	Till	John Carthan	
TBA	Untitled Stephen Merchant film	TBA	Filming

=== Television ===
Year	Title	Role	Notes
1974	Great Performances	Captain	Episode: "King Lear"
1979	Hot Hero Sandwich	-	TV series
1982	Another World	Captain Hancock	Episode #1.4478
1983	The Edge of Night	Ralph Pettibone	Regular cast
1983	Sessions	Intern	TV movie
1985	Search for Tomorrow	Willard Clovis	Episode #1.8643
1985	Kate & Allie	Detective	Episode: "The Bad Seed"
1987	The Equalizer	Zudo	Episode: "Mission: McCall"
1989	A Man Called Hawk	Mr. Carver	Episode: "Choice of Chance"
1989	Monsters	Jack Lyle	Episode: "The Mandrake Root"
1990	Common Ground	-	Miniseries
1990	Law & Order	Lester Crawford	Episode: "Out of the Half-Light"
1990–91	True Colors	Ron Freeman	Main cast
1992	All My Children	Minister Bauer	Episode #1.5910
1994	The Spider and the Fly	Detective Turner	TV movie
1995	The Langoliers	Don Gaffney	2 episodes
1996	New York Undercover	Captain Wilton	Episode: "Fire Show"
1997	Oz	Cornelius Keane	Episode: "Capital P"
1997–98	Cosby	Ron	Episode: "I'm OK, You're Hilton" & "On the Rocks"
1998	Prey	Ray Peterson	Main cast
1998–99	All My Children	Frank Dawson	Regular cast
2001	Call Me Claus	Dwayne	TV movie
2002–08	The Wire	Ervin Burrell	Main cast (season 1-4), recurring cast (season 5)
2004	The Jury	Nick Van Lier	Episode: "Bangers"
2007–08	Law & Order: Special Victims Unit	FBI Agent Tom Nickerson	Episode: "Florida" & "Signature"
2008	Army Wives	General Baxter	Episode: "Departures, Arrivals"
2008	Play or Be Played	Detective Lyle	TV movie
2008–12	One Life to Live	Richard Evans	Regular cast
2009–20	Grey's Anatomy	William Bailey	4 episodes
2010	Blue Bloods	Jeffords	Episode: "Samaritan"
2010	Lie to Me	Teddy	Episode: "Smoked"
2010–15	The Good Wife	Jeremiah Easton	4 episodes
2013	Elementary	Judge Brewster O'Hare	Episode: "Tremors"
2013–16	Banshee	Sugar Bates	34 episodes
2014	Unforgettable	Mayor Beverly	Episode: "Omega Hour"
2014	Black Box	Wade	Episode: "Sing Like Me"
2014	Forever	Pepper Evans	Episode: "6 A.M."
2016	Luke Cage	Henry "Pop" Hunter	Guest star, 2 episodes
2017	The Good Fight	Jeremiah Easton	Episode: "Reddick v Boseman"
2017	Ryan Hansen Solves Crimes on Television	Captain Jackson #5	Episode: "Hungry for Justice"
2018	Hawaii Five-0	Leroy Davis	Episode: "Aohe Mea Make I Ka Hewa; Make No I Ka Mihi Ole"
2019	The Village	Ron	10 episodes
2020	God Friended Me	Mr. Johnson	Episode: "Harlem Cinema House"
2020	The Expanse	Charles	Episode: "Churn"
2021	The Blacklist	Abraham Moores	Episode: "The Fribourg Confidence"
2021	Bull	Lee Donaldson	Episode: "King Bull"
2021	Redemption in Cherry Springs	Joe	TV movie
2022	The Rookie	Christopher "Cutty" Clark	2 episodes
2022–23	The Rookie: Feds	Christopher "Cutty" Clark	Main cast
2023	Hello Tomorrow!	Buck Manzell	4 episodes
2025	The Upshaws	Clarence	1 episode
2025	Ballard	Paw Paw	1 episode
2025	Ripple	Walter	Main role; 8 episodes
