= Crutch (film) =

- Directed by: Rob Moretti
- Written by: Paul Jacks; Rob Moretti
- Produced by: Michael Philip Anthony; Rob Moretti; Eric Smith
- Cinematography: Brian Fass
- Edited by: Jennifer Erickson; Rob Moretti
- Music by: Ben Goldberg
- Distributed by: Ardustry Home Entertainment LLC; HP Releasing
- Release date: September 17, 2004
- Running time: 88 minutes
- Country: United States
- Language: English

Crutch is a 2004 autobiographical coming-of-age drama film written and directed by Rob Moretti.

== Synopsis ==
16-year-old David seems to have a normal middle-class life in the suburban world outside New York City. When David's father leaves his alcoholic wife after 17 years, David is forced to become parent to his siblings and caregiver to his alcoholic mother. Theater coach Kenny becomes enamored of David. Overwhelmed by his home situation, David is weakened and falls prey to Kenny's advances, which leads to his own involvement with drugs and alcohol.

== Cast ==
- Eben Gordon as David Graham
- Rob Moretti as Kenny Griffith
- Juanita Walsh as Katie Graham
- Jennifer Laine Williams as Julia
- Jennifer Katz as Maryann
- James A. Earley as Jack Graham
- Robert Bray as Michael Graham
- Laura O'Reilly as Lisa Graham
- Tim Loftus as Zack
- Sylvia Norman as Linda
- Frankie Faison as Jerry
- Tia Dionne Hodge as Janice

== Critical response ==
Anita Gates of The New York Times wrote: "'Crutch' doesn't have the texture or power of Blue Car, Karen Moncrieff's 2002 film with Agnes Bruckner as the neglected, emotionally needy teenager and David Strathairn as the high school poetry teacher who takes advantage ... [it] does sound a note of real anguish, however." Don Willmott of Filmcritic.com wrote, "'Crutch' comes across as an extremely personal exorcism of Moretti's suburban gothic adolescence, for better and for worse. Like the scribblings in a teenager's diary, the film vacillates between insight and exaggeration". Movies Online opined Crutch "is a captivating and brutally honest look into love, loss, lies and our own dark secrets". In a negative review, DVD Verdict opined that "Rob Moretti's Crutch is the kind of film I feel bad for not liking. It's awfully sincere, and, darn it, everyone involved tries real hard, but the movie still comes up short".
