= Simone/Enervo =

Simone and Ernevo
- The Rookie episodes
- Episode nos.: Season 4 Episodes 19 & 20
- Directed by: Liz Friedlander (19); Bill Roe (20)
- Written by: Alexi Hawley; Terence Paul Winter
- Original air dates: April 24, 2022 (19); May 1, 2022 (20)
- Running time: 2 episodes, 43 minutes each

Guest appearances
- Niecy Nash-Betts as Simone Clark; Felix Solis as Matthew Garza; Kat Foster as Casey Fox; Frankie Faison as Christopher Clark; Yuri Sardarov as Trevor Gurin / Ilya Sokurov; Arye Gross as Professor Meadows (19); Arjay Smith as James Murray (20); Adrian Pasdar as Bill August (20); Elizabeth Grullón as Kate Hill (20); Brent Huff as Quigley Smitty (20)

Episode chronology
← Previous ""Backstabbers""	Next → ""Mother's Day""

"Simone" and "Enervo" are two episodes of American television series The Rookie. The episodes serve as the back door pilot for The Rookie: Feds. The episodes center around a domestic terror plot that introduces characters from the FBI who are planned to appear in the potential spin off of The Rookie: Feds. Critics for the episodes praised the chemistry between Nash and Fillion alongside other members of The Rookie cast.

== Premise ==
=== Simone ===
A couple out for exercise are approached by a man (Yuri Sardarov) who tries to get them to go into a power station that he has rigged to explode. The couple refuse and call the police where John Nolan and Lucy Chen (Nathan Fillion and Melissa O'Neil) arrive and enter the power station to find the bomb and escape before the power station blows up. While being treated by paramedics, Wade Grey checks on them and then briefs FBI agents Matthew Garza and Casey Fox (Felix Solis and Kat Foster) on the case and gets Garza to agree to having a joint task force.

Meanwhile detectives Angela Lopez and Nyla Harper (Alyssa Diaz and Mekia Cox) arrive at a house where a man, Professor Meadows (Arye Gross) claims to have been briefly held hostage by an alien who took maps of the roads of Los Angeles, the detectives don't take him seriously.

Prints recovered from the bomb leads the LAPD and FBI to Ezekiel Freemont (Keith Machekanyanga) but he has already fled his residence when it is revealed that his former guidance counsellor, Simone Clark (Niecy Nash-Betts) is currently training to become an agent at the FBI Academy so Garza requests for her to be brought to Los Angeles. When she arrives, she disagrees with the profiler's profile of Freemont but isn't taken serious by anyone except for Nolan where Garza then tells her to return to Quantico. Nolan and Clark soon find Freemont hiding in a tunnel where he is apprehended and brought to the police station. Garza chastises Clark for not returning to Quantico as she is going to leave Fox comes out to inform her and Nolan that Freemont will only speak to her. After the interview she informs Nolan that she has to get him a lawyer.

While Lopez and Harper are working on the case of Meadows, Tim Bradford (Eric Winter) pulls them to assist on working out what the bomber's target could be and they all realize he is going after the local National Guard armory and manipulates a soldier into helping him by kidnapping his husband. Nolan's girlfriend Bailey Nune is working in the national guard, and she reports to Nolan that the armory has been infiltrated. It's believed he is escaping in a Humvee but it's revealed it's being drove by the soldier he manipulated.

Simone visits her father (Frankie Faison) who isn't impressed to see her due to her joining the FBI when he is part of the Defund the police movement. She asks her father to help in getting a lawyer for Freemont and admits how she feels the FBI don't truly want her where he shows compassion and tells her that "nobody tells my baby girl that she doesn't belong".

The next day Garza informs the LAPD, that other federal agencies are getting involved due to the number of explosives stolen from the armory. While Harper approaches Lopez about prints on the professor's door but they came back classified where they've been classified by the "Air Force base at Groom Lake" also known as Area 51. Simone goes back to the station hoping to join the taskforce. Fox tries to inform her that the FBI is still a "boy's club". While Lopez and Harper try to speak to Professor Meadows, Simone gives advise on how to deal with him and speaks with him and then learns that his attacker was the man who bombed the power station. They learn that the name the bomber is using is Trevor Gurin. Garza mentions to Simone that she feels she should be on the taskforce. When they raid the house Gurin is using, they find the manipulated soldier's husband dead in a cage. Lucy discovers a small piece of map ripped off the wall where pins would've been placed. Lucy finds a word "Enervo" where they theorize that he could have links to CIA. Gurin using Meadows' identity plants bombs in five vans and convinces five random drivers to drive the vans in a ruse of conducting an experiment.

=== Enervo ===
The five vans leave Gurin while Lopez and Harper brief everyone about the trucks. Grey and Garza go in a helicopter. When one of the vans arrives at a location, Gurin remotely detonates it wrecking a section of the freeway. Bradford and Chen stop one of the vans where the driver is shaken to know that he was driving a bomb. Garza informs where one of the other vans is located, while Smitty (Brent Huff) stops the fourth van. Nolan and Clark drive head on into the fifth van successfully stopping it. Bailey arrives on scene and berates Nolan for being reckless.

Garza and Grey go and visit the CIA in the hope to get answers where they meet an agent, Bill August (Adrian Pasdar) who would rather discuss things in the SCIF. August denies any knowledge of Gurin or the word Enervo. But when they leave, he sends agents to try and cover things up.

At the hospital, Cutty shows concern for Simone after the crash but isn't happy to see her with Nolan due to Nolan being a police officer. Cutty berates Fox for Simone being in danger where she says that Simone will be going to the office to work on data where he approves. Meanwhile Bradford informs Nolan that he will be making contact with an old acquaintance, Kate Hill (Elizabeth Grullón) of his. When they meet Kate, she isn't amused over being called for information and gets scared when Nolan uses the word Enervo due to it meant to be secret and she is scared that someone will be coming for her which she is correct about. August's man, Colin verbally threatens Nolan and Bradford to let Kate get into his car. When Kate was leaving, Nolan slipped his phone into Kate's pocket. When learning of this Garza calls Elena Flores (Note: Later portrayed by Michelle Núñez in The Rookie: Feds and season 8 of The Rookie) who he reveals to Grey is his niece. After getting the LAPD showing in force, Bradford and Nolan rescue Kate from Colin and take her to the station.

At the FBI offices, Fox asks Simone to go through the tip line to find tips related to a man with a Russian accent. Fox reveals that Garza wants to launch a new unit who deals with crimes on the street as they happen instead of being there to clean up. Simone makes an excuse to go to the bathroom so she can go speak to Freemont in custody. She gives him a music player that she found in lost in found. She asks him for more details of Gurin to which he reveals that he eats a Russian candy bar she asks him to draw the wrapper for her.

Gurin leaves his car in an alleyway, calls the police to get them to come out because he has planted some of August's DNA on a hairbrush in the car. Lopez and Harper call Simone and Fox to come to investigate the car with them.

At the station, Kate berates Bradford for everything that happened while Garza tells her she has to tell them what happened as the CIA won't be protecting her anymore by threatening to arrest her. Kate reveals that the bomber is called Ilya Sokurov who was being used as an asset after being captured by Russian authorities.

Simone goes to the local community center to speak to her father who is there helping James Murray and Wesley Evers (Arjay Smith and Shawn Ashmore) contact the families of people who may have been affected by the earlier bombing. It is revealed that James used to have a crush on Simone. Cutty is able to tell Simone where sells the candy bar and she rings Nolan to ask him to join her.

While waiting on Nolan, Simone sees Sokurov and approaches him pretending to be lost despite Nolan protesting her doing that on the phone. Sokurov beats Simone a little as Nolan arrives and they chase him into the aquarium. August learns from Colin that the police are on the tail of Sokurov where he orders them to kill him while Grey and Garza arrive to arrest August. At the aquarium Sokurov reveals that August promised to protect his family in Russia but abandoned them and they were killed. When leaving the aquarium, they are ambushed by Colin and his men in which Simone and Nolan get into a shootout until other police arrive to back them up.

Garza berates Simone for her lack of following rules and protocols but does admit she did help within solving the case. Cutty is shown to be waiting to take her back to the airport where Nolan is also waiting outside. Due to saving Simone's life, Cutty accepts Nolan. Simone says her goodbyes to Nolan as she leaves.

== Development ==
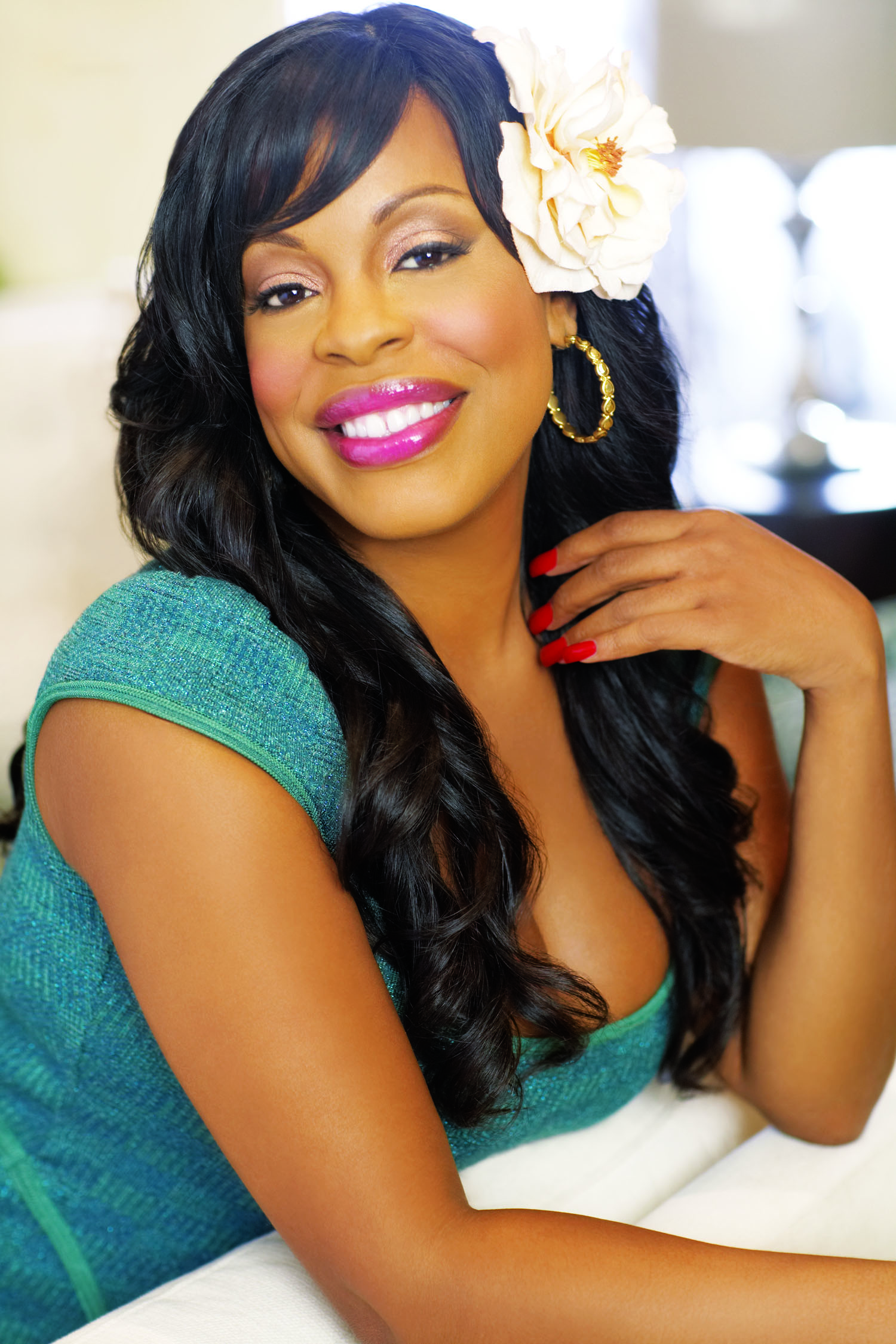
Niecy Nash-Betts (pictured in 2008), was praised for her chemistry with Nathan Fillion

In February 2022, it was announced that The Rookie was going to make a backdoor pilot for a potential FBI spin-off. It was announced that Niecy Nash-Betts was cast as Simone Clark. Nash said "I'm so excited to guest star on The Rookie and bring Simone Clark to life! She is a spirited and spicy fish out of water,"... "The cast is amazing and I can't wait to play!"

It was then announced that Kat Foster and Felix Solis were cast as characters Casey Fox and Matthew Garza. It was reported that "Foster will guest star as Special Agent Casey Fox. Fox has been on the job for five years and has succeeded by being both whip-smart and a team player. She is a rule-follower who knows how to work the system to get the best assignments. As a training agent, she is determined to instill conformity in her trainees – the way to survive and thrive is to fit in and get ahead… Solis will play Special Agent Matthew Garza, a 20-year veteran of the FBI who has been a true believer in the "Agency way" his whole career. A senior agent on the cusp of being promoted to a leadership role, Garza is tough, smart and filled with a little too much self-importance."

A week later, it was announced that Frankie Faison was cast as Christopher "Cutty" Clark, Simone's father. It was said "Faison will play Christopher "Cutty" Clark, a man whose dreams were shattered when he was falsely imprisoned in the '80s. He worked hard to put his life back together after he was exonerated. Cutty is a proud, no-nonsense man with a subversive sense of humor."

== Reception ==
In a review for the "Simone" episode, Raquel Morales of Fangirlish says "The Rookie 4×19 "Simone" is two main things: the first part of a two-part event and a pilot pitch for a potential spin-off. This makes the plot leave us in the middle – something that, although frustrating, is logical." She added "In The Rookie 4×19 "Simone" we have a bit of everything. In other words, it's undeniable that the episode was focused on introducing us to Simone for us to discover her as a character. We became interested in her story, and we began to love her." Morales praised the chemistry between Simone, Nolan, Lopez and Harper by saying "But, at the same time, Simone fits in with the "original" characters that we love. Of course, her clearest reflection in The Rookie was Nolan but not only did she fit in with him, but she also had a good time with Angela and Harper and I don't know...it's that kind of on-screen chemistry that makes you just can't look away. And it worked." Although when reviewing the following episode, Morales did fault how it was more about Simone than The Rookie cast by saying "Because we love Simone, she has potential…but we don't love feeling like she took time away from the important plotlines of our show." When discussing the apprehension of Sokurov, Morales said "The villain was too easy to catch. That's probably because the show established that this villain was so good and so capable of doing everything without getting caught, that the capture felt completely anticlimactic. I was disappointed in a big way." And added "the capture of the villain is not only too quick and anticlimactic but also very poorly planned."

Jasmine Blu of TVFanatic wrote "As a backdoor pilot, they balanced things well. We spent a significant amount of time with Simone and got to know her rather well, and because of the "all hands on deck" approach to the case, nearly all the other characters were involved." She added "Nash-Betts and Fillion had serviceable chemistry. She did a lot of the heavy lifting selling us on this character, rounding her out as much as possible despite everything else happening." She also talked about the performance given by Sadarov by saying "It was good to see Chicago Fire's Yuriy Sardarov again, even though he's playing a mysterious Russian terrorist who may have some sort of ties to the CIA. He's perfectly sinister and mysterious here as the man with the scar. He's a slippery guy, and he keeps evading them at every turn. When reviewing the following episode, Blu said "By the end of the hour, it's still hard to say what Ilya's larger plan was and the significance of setting multiple bombs to get back at the station manager for his actions." They added "The hour didn't lose the momentum of The Rookie, but it shifted its focus and tone a bit, making it much stronger as the new characters settled into their roles more." They finished by saying "Overall, the hour was fun, action-packed, and it further developed these new characters, even though most of the other Rookie characters fell by the wayside. Setting aside that we have to suspend some belief with some of the logistics, Niecey Nash-Betts has been fabulous as Simone, and the character is an endearing one. It would be a shame if we don't get more of her in some capacity. And by the second half of this two-parter, I can better grasp what this spinoff would look like, and I'm not hating it one bit.
