= The Rookie: Feds =

2022 American police procedural drama TV series

- Genre: Police procedural; Crime drama; Action
- Created by: Alexi Hawley; Terence Paul Winter
- Starring: Niecy Nash-Betts; Frankie Faison; James Lesure; Britt Robertson; Felix Solis; Kevin Zegers
- Composer: Jordan Gagne
- Country of origin: United States
- Original language: English
- No. of seasons: 1
- No. of episodes: 22

Production
- Executive producers: Alexi Hawley; Terence Paul Winter; Niecy Nash; Nathan Fillion; Michelle Chapman; Bill Norcross; Corey Miller; Mark Gordon; Bibby Dunn
- Production location: Los Angeles, California
- Running time: 43 minutes
- Production companies: ABC Signature; Entertainment One; Perfectman Pictures; Winterworks

Original release
- Network: ABC
- Release: September 27, 2022 – May 2, 2023

Related
- The Rookie

The Rookie: Feds is an American police procedural television series and spin-off of The Rookie. Created by Alexi Hawley and Terence Paul Winter for ABC, the series follows Simone Clark, the oldest rookie in the FBI Academy. Niecy Nash-Betts, Felix Solis, Frankie Faison, Britt Robertson, Kevin Zegers, and James Lesure were cast in starring roles. The basic premise of the series and its characters were introduced through a two-episode backdoor pilot in The Rookie. It aired from September 27, 2022, to May 2, 2023. In November 2023, the series was cancelled after one season at least in part by the 2023 Hollywood double strike. Despite being cancelled, Solis, Robertson, and Zegers reprised their roles in Seasons 6 and 7 of The Rookie, with Solis reappearing in Season 8.

== Cast and characters ==
=== Main ===
- Niecy Nash-Betts as Simone Clark, a former Washington, D.C. school counselor who, at the age of 48, finally achieved her lifelong dream of joining the FBI as a special agent. After spending her first day with the Los Angeles Field Office's Background Check Unit, she was assigned to SSA Garza's Special Investigative Unit. Her training agent is SA Carter Hope.
- Frankie Faison as Christopher "Cutty" Clark, Simone's father. He was wrongfully convicted when Simone was nine years old and spent eight years in prison before being exonerated. As a leader of the Black Lives Matter movement, he is initially unhappy about his daughter's career change. However, he eventually reconciles with her and allows her to move back in with him.
- James Lesure as Carter Hope, a career FBI special agent assigned to SSA Garza's Special Investigative Unit. He serves as SA Simone Clark's training agent, and is usually annoyed by Simone's more unorthodox methods. However, he comes to respect her methods as they show success. As the series begins, he and his estranged wife are pursuing a divorce, and he is looking for a promotion to New Orleans to be near his children as his estranged wife looks to relocate.
- Britt Robertson as Laura Stensen, an FBI special agent who is a former member of the FBI Behavioral Science Unit now assigned to SSA Garza's Special Investigative Unit. She also serves as SSA Garza's confidant and SA Brendon Acres' training agent. Once the youngest agent of the BSU, she went on leave when she caught her fiancé, Sam, in bed with her best friend. She is hoping to use her time in the Unit as a step towards the career she once had.
- Felix Solis as Matthew "Matt" Garza, a supervisory special agent and team leader of the newly formed Special Investigative Unit with the Los Angeles Field Office (which his superiors agreed to let him run but plan to scrap the second his unit fails), intending to focus more on police work than "FBI bureaucratic procedure". He's also dealing with some health issues.
- Kevin Zegers as Brendon Acres (birth name Brendon Butkus), Simone's fellow graduate of the FBI Academy who is also a special agent assigned to SSA Garza's Special Investigative Unit. His training agent is SA Laura Stensen. Before joining the Bureau, he was an award-winning actor who starred on the popular young-adult television series Vampire Cop for six years. He was pushed into acting by his single father after his mother left the family.

=== Recurring ===
- Michelle Nuñez as Elena Flores, the Special Investigative Unit's tech analyst and SSA Garza's niece
- Devika Bhise as Antoinette Benneteau, an FBI Laboratory Technician and Forensic Biologist, Brendon's love interest.
- Courtney Ford as Tracy Chiles, a FBI special agent in charge of FBI Los Angeles Field Office and Garza's immediate superior
- Jessica Betts as DJ, Simone's love interest

=== Guest ===
- Thomas Dekker as Eli Reynolds (alias Jeffrey Boyle), an acolyte of Rosalind Dyer
- Eric Roberts as Josh Reynolds, Eli's father
- Oceanne Iradukunda as Simone Clark's fellow inmate during an operation when she went undercover at a prison
- Deniz Akdeniz as Mark Atlas, Laura Stensen's former partner in the BSU
- Tom Arnold as Miles Butkus, Brendon's manipulative father
- David Ramsey as Greg Wright
- Dia Nash as Billie, Simone's daughter
- Mateo Pollock as Max, Simone's son
- Wallace Langham as Alan Brady
- Teddy Sears as George Rice
- Donna Mills as Layla Laughlin, a cosmetics businesswoman
- Carlos Leal as Tobias Kazan, drug dealer
- John Douglas as Heath Radnor
- Josh Coxx as Owen Ripley, a seasoned DEA special agent-in-charge of the DEA Los Angeles Field Office

=== Crossover characters from The Rookie ===
- Nathan Fillion as John Nolan, the oldest rookie of the LAPD, turned Training Officer, who befriended Simone Clark when she was in Los Angeles.
- Alyssa Diaz as Angela Lopez, a detective with the LAPD Mid-Wilshire Division
- Brent Huff as Quigley Smitty, a veteran, but lazy officer with the LAPD Mid-Wilshire Division
- Melissa O'Neil as Lucy Chen, a police officer at LAPD Mid-Wilshire Division
- Eric Winter as Tim Bradford, an LAPD liaison sergeant between the elite Metro Division and Mid-Wilshire Division.
- Richard T. Jones as Wade Grey, a Watch Commander at LAPD Mid-Wilshire Division
- Shawn Ashmore as Wesley Evers, a defense lawyer turned Assistant District Attorney and Angela Lopez's husband
- Brandon Jay McLaren as Elijah Stone, a crime boss who forces Wesley to be his attorney.

== Episodes ==
=== Backdoor pilot (2022) ===
For the backdoor pilot, "No. overall" and "No. in season" refer to the episode's place in the order of episodes of The Rookie.

No. overall	No. in season	Title	Directed by	Written by	Original release date	Prod. code	U.S. viewers (millions)
73	19	"Simone"	Liz Friedlander	Alexi Hawley & Terence Paul Winter	April 24, 2022	419	3.95
Nolan and Lucy respond to a call of a suspicious person near a power station, which they quickly realize has a bomb in it. They escape before it detonates. The FBI's Los Angeles division is called in when it is suspected that the bomber belongs to a terrorist cell. When the FBI learns that the suspect, Zeke Freemont, has a connection to trainee Simone Clark, they call her in to assist, but she is soon dismissed. Nolan encourages her to stand up for herself and they find common ground with both having been the oldest trainee. Lead agent Matt Garza calls her in to question Zeke as he only wants to speak to her. He reveals that he built bombs for the bomber, but didn't know what they were for. Lopez and Harper investigate a supposed break in at a professor's house, and with Simone's help, discover that it was the same suspect as with the bombing, who is later identified as Trevor Gurin, with a classified connection to Groom Lake. With reluctance, Garza takes Simone on to his team. Through map evidence at the suspect' house and the codeword "Enervo", they deduce that Trevor was former military. He steals further bombs from the National Guard's weapon storage, and initiates his plan to take down the city's infrastructure, starting with the roads.
74	20	"Enervo"	Bill Roe	Alexi Hawley & Terence Paul Winter	May 1, 2022	420	4.17
The Mid-Wilshire station and the LA Division of the FBI race to stop bombs that have been scattered throughout the city on board separate vans. Deducing that the targets are every freeway, Simone leads herself and Nolan in the direction of one of the trucks and narrowly sideswipe it just before it reaches a freeway bridge. Grey and Garza take to the skies to get an overview from there, while Tim, Lucy, and LAPD and FBI cavalcades manage to stop the remaining vans, although one still detonates, killing 17 people. Garza and Grey approach the LA CIA station in hopes of help, but its chief, Bill August, turns them down, though he promises to look into the classified file on Trevor. Tim and Nolan meet one of the former's former associates, Kate Hill, who works for the CIA, who are quick to shut them down, but are shut down by the LAPD in return. Kate reveals that "Enervo" was a black Ops designed to destabilise foreign cities, headed by Bill and the lead perpetrator being Trevor, whose real name is Ilya Sokorov. Simone follows a lead with the help of Zeke identifying a Russian chocolate bar Ilya had. She meets him near the aquarium before the two fight before Nolan arrives. They track Ilya into the aquarium, where he explains that Bill deserted him and his crew and left them for dead, and his acts of terrorism was revenge against Bill. Just then, Bill's men arrive and a shootout endures as they flee outside, where the LAPD and FBI arrive to arrest Bill's men.

=== Season 1 (2022–23) ===
No.	Title	Directed by	Written by	Original release date	Prod. code	U.S. viewers (millions)
1	"Day One"	Bill Roe	Alexi Hawley & Terence Paul Winter	September 27, 2022	101	2.28
Simone begins her first official day in the Los Angeles FBI, accompanied by her friend Brendon Acres, a former actor, the two now FBI Special Agents or Probies. Brendon is invited to join Garza's new unit, but Simone is initially relegated to the profiling department as Garza's team investigate a man beaten to death during an apparent break-in. Simone is able to get involved in the case when her LAPD contacts alert her to a suspect under arrest linked to a participant in the break-in, which leads to the realization that the thieves intend to break into the federal reserve. Simone's advice leads to the team's first case being a success, but Garza's supervisor Tracey Chiles is still trying to get the unit shut down, to the point of attempting to blackmail Simone's training agent Carter Hope to give her incriminating data on Garza.
2	"Face Off"	Michael Goi	Wendy Calhoun	October 4, 2022	102	1.77
Simone and Brendon try to pass their first test as agents by getting their first informant. Brendon's attempt to use the bellhop at his hotel lead to him angering a senator, but Simone's recent arrest of a drug dealer leads to them finding an arms dealer on the Most Wanted list who has paid two people to undergo plastic surgery to use as decoys. The team are able to track down the original dealer (who had given himself a new appearance with plastic surgery) and successfully arrest him. Brendon manages to get a new informant when he realizes that a film producer he met with during a script read is using his studio to launder dirty money, offering to keep the producer out of prison if he serves as an informant.
3	"Star Crossed"	Robert Bella	Nancy Kiu	October 11, 2022	103	1.57
Simone and Brandon's first attempt at a surveillance op involves planting cameras in a restaurant where two gangs are about to meet, but the effort is interrupted when their elderly supervising officer dies in his sleep. While they are able to get incriminating evidence on tape, the situation becomes complicated when they return to retrieve the cameras and realize that the families' two children are involved in a relationship before they witness the children being abducted. The subsequent investigation reveals that Aliz Kazan, daughter of meth distributor Tobias Kazan, staged the relationship and the kidnapping to get money of her own, but the deception is exposed and Aliz is sent to prison. Meanwhile, Laura faces her own complex feelings when her old best friend reveals that she is now engaged to Laura's ex-fiancé, while Simone pursues a secret relationship with the daughter of her father's latest partner.
4	"To Die For"	Tori Garrett	Nick Hurwitz	October 18, 2022	104	2.01
Sociopathic serial killer Rosalind Dyer's death while taken back into LAPD custody sends the FBI team hunting her killer. He's a presumed Dyer accomplice who devises booby-trapped, watery death tanks to kill his victims—including the one from which LAFD officer Bailey Nune was rescued—based upon childhood tortures inflicted by his abusive father. While working the case, Laura reunites with a former FBI partner, Mark Atlas, who challenges her as she also grapples with her feelings for him in the wake of her ex-fiancé's betrayal. As well as working the investigation, Simone and Matt each try to encourage Carter to begin moving forward from his broken marriage. Note: This episode concludes a crossover event that begins on The Rookie season 5 episode 4. Eric Winter (Tim Bradford) is credited as a Special Guest Star.
5	"Felicia"	Eric Dean Seaton	Stacy A. Littlejohn	October 25, 2022	105	1.87
After overseeing the extradition of a witness on the run in the Bahamas, Simone and Carter find themselves trapped and hiding after the local police sell them out to his criminal employers. After getting back to Los Angeles with their prisoner, she and Carter discover that a rogue District Attorney was actually behind the sell out, but are able to neutralize him and recover the evidence needed. Laura and Brendon investigate a cold diamond theft/murder after Elena finds diamonds sewn into her new purse.
6	"The Reaper"	Cheryl Dunye	Stephanie Hicks	November 1, 2022	106	1.81
Simone and Carter go undercover in a Ventura County jail to gain information from the girlfriend of a sniper. While Simone tries to gain her trust, Carter is recognized by a prisoner whom he busted three years ago. Simone is able to get information about the boyfriend, before she and the team realize that the girlfriend is actually the sniper. After she escapes by posing as a warden, the team races to find out where she is and who her target is. Brendon's father is caught breaking and entering into his storage unit, forcing him to confront his father's behavior. Simone breaks up with DJ after feeling she needs to focus on her career, and that their relationship should not suffer because of that.
7	"Countdown"	Cherie Nowlan	Corey Miller	November 15, 2022	107	1.55
The team is called to help find a scientist who disappeared while exploring the Angeles National Forest but things change when the scientist is found dead along with traces of radioactive material, sending the team along with their counterparts at the LAPD into a race against time to find and stop a terrorist who's planning on detonating dirty bombs around downtown Los Angeles while as Laura celebrates her birthday, Brendon uses his own profiling skills in the hope of finding the ideal gift for her.
8	"Standoff"	P.J. Pesce	Amanda Mercedes	November 22, 2022	108	1.74
As Los Angeles prepares to celebrate Thanksgiving, the team investigate when a father and his young daughter are kidnapped by a mysterious group, the search leading to a hostage situation at the District Attorney's Office as the team struggle to apprehend the criminals with assistance from both Wesley Evers and Angela Lopez, a District Attorney and Detective assigned to LAPD Mid-Wiltshire's division while Simon and Cutty get a surprise when Simone's twin children, Billie and Max arrive home for Thanksgiving. Later, after arresting the group responsible, the team gather at Simone's house and along with Cutty, Billie and Max, for a late Thanksgiving dinner.
9	"Flashback"	Tessa Blake	Alexi Hawley	November 29, 2022	109	2.47
When Garza is arrested on charges of espionage, the team go off the grid to investigate and discover it's connected to an operation Garza worked five years ago, one that resulted in the death of the woman he was seeing at the time. The episode ends with Garza arriving at the gravesite of his dead lover and collapsing seconds later.
10	"The Silent Prisoner"	Michael Goi	Terence Paul Winter	January 3, 2023	110	3.80
While Garza undergoes surgery, the team and LAPD team up to find and arrest a criminal who is in possession of a list containing the names of undercover FBI agents. The criminal uses his ownership of the list to negotiate an inmate's release, which creates a race against the clock for the team. The case becomes personal when one agent whose cover is blown is stabbed and dies despite Brendon attempting to help him. Meanwhile, Simone enlists John Nolan's help as she plans on remodeling her father's garage into a living space. Brendon prepares to confess his feelings to Antoinette. Note: This episode concludes a crossover event that begins on The Rookie season 5 episode 10. Nathan Fillion (John Nolan) is credited as a Special Guest Star.
11	"Close Contact"	Oz Scott	Teleplay by : Wendy Calhoun & Amanda Mercedes; Story by : Nancy Kiu	January 10, 2023	111	2.62
When Congressman Damien Roberts avoids being killed by a car bomb, the team investigates the attempted murder. While Simone and Carter are assigned to guard Damien at work and his place of residence, Laura and Brendon investigate potential suspects. Simone and Damien rekindle their previous relationship, exploring the reasons they broke it off, and talking about their future. Brendon prepares to take the next step in his relationship with Antoinette.
12	"Out for Blood"	Lanre Olabisi	Teleplay by : Stacy A. Littlejohn & Stephanie Hicks; Story by : Nick Hurwitz	January 17, 2023	112	2.99
The episode was shot like a documentary, with the FBI agents being interviewed by a producer, as well as LAPD agent Quigley Smitty. The team investigates a murder where the victim was exsanguinated (drained of blood). Brendon shares his expertise as "Vampire Cop" to help his teammates solve the case and find the murderer. During the investigation, the agents discover a beauty industry conspiracy involving the founder of a successful company and her son.
13	"The Remora"	Michael Goi	Corey Miller	January 24, 2023	113	2.81
When the team are acting as 'supporting extras' in a sting operation to intercept the sale of satellite defense plans, the sale goes wrong when the original seller doesn't turn up. The team realize that they are dealing with a criminal that Carter terms "the Remora"; he stalks other criminals and kills them once they have completed a big heist to take the profits for himself, but the satellite plans were just too large for his usual approach. Meanwhile, Simone and her father are surprised to be visited by Simone's daughter and her new boyfriend, and have to decide how to deal with the young man in question.
14	"The Offer"	Jon Huertas	Wendy Calhoun & Nancy Kiu	January 31, 2023	114	3.19
The team's intended "housekeeping" day is complicated when billionaire Pierce Langham offers a ten million dollar bounty for the safe return of his abducted daughter Brie. Meanwhile Garza's ex-wife, Candace Thurlow, visits the team to see them in action, and offers Simone a chance to become a more public figure in the Bureau. The investigation into Brie's kidnapping reveals that it was organised by her brother Tate to prevent her taking part in a key vote that would have allowed him to take over the company, but by the time Tate's role is exposed Brie has been taken prisoner by a pair of mercenaries. When Langham refuses to pay the offered money under these circumstances, Brie betrays her father's location to her abductors, but the team are able to convince Tate to help in time to save Pierce's life. With Pierce hospitalized, Brie is able to take over the company. Simone ultimately declines Candace's offer, wanting to make changes from the inside rather than as a public figure forced to play by her rules.
15	"Dead Again"	Lanre Olabisi	Stephanie Hicks & Amanda Mercedes	February 14, 2023	115	2.62
The team investigate when an investment banker is found dead even though he was declared dead six years ago and his wife accused of the crime. The subsequent investigation reveals that he was working for criminals to launder money and stole the cash for himself to run away with his mistress, who subsequently turned him over to his old associates when he was planning to run away again. Meanwhile, Simone puts the victim's ex-wife in contact with her father to help the woman rebuild her life and get back in contact with her son.
16	"For Love and Money"	Jean E. Lee	Stacy A. Littlejohn & Nick Hurwitz	February 21, 2023	116	2.60
A sting operation to catch a serial Casanova scamming women out of money results in the team meeting detective Naomi Voss, who had been tracking the man on behalf of a past victim. The team attempt to use the man to get an in to the drug empire of Tobias Kazan, as one of the women he scammed was Tobias's wife Cora, but the scammer is subsequently found dead in his boat. When Aliz is threatened in prison, Kazan seemingly agrees to turn state's evidence in exchange for his daughter being transferred to a new prison, but the team discover in time that it was an attempt to kill Garza by blowing up the lab. Kazan gets off without consequences, while his wife refuses to turn state's evidence to ensure her daughter's protection. Meanwhile Carter and Brendon's relationships are complicated by their differing Valentines' plans with their significant others, as Carter wasn't sure it was soon enough to plan anything with Fortune and Antoinette claimed she didn't want anything.
17	"Payback"	Robert Bella	Kate Sargeant	February 28, 2023	117	2.80
With Elijah Stone having been arrested by the LAPD, the FBI, with the help of seasoned DEA agent Owen Ripley, find themselves tracking Elijah's new partner, Abril Rodas. In the USA, Laura and Brendon look into Elijah's associates, while Simone and Carter fly to Guatemala to investigate a lead on Abril Rodas. Instead of locating Abril, they discover the corpse of a priest, Father Juan. Laura and Mark determine that the murder doesn't fit her MO (modus operandi), which hints at a personal vendetta. Elena's phone is bugged by Abril's right hand and girlfriend, Daylin Morales, which gives the criminals access to the FBI's investigation. Eventually, the agents track down Abril's father's murderer, revealed to be Owen, through the priest, and reach her as she tries to kill him. Despite Simone attempting to talk her down, Abril kills Owen before Carter shoots her. The agent's personal lives are also challenged ; Mark Atlas and Laura confront their feelings after Brendon invites him to work on the case, Carter Hope meets an old acquaintance, DEA agent Lind, and they discuss their old conflict. Simone and Cutty visit the cop who framed him, giving themselves the gift of forgiveness. Note: This episode concludes a crossover event that begins on The Rookie season 5 episode 17.
18	"Seeing Red"	Patrick Cady	Corey Miller & Wendy Calhoun	March 21, 2023	118	2.30
The seemingly simple attack on a dog-walker leads to the theft of a diplomatic bag from Belarus. When the team investigate, they discover that the bag contains forged plates for US dollars, smuggled in by the consul's son without his father's knowledge. Using Brandon's popularity in Belarus, the team attempt to sneak in to a party and retrieve the plates, but the consular's son manages to steal them for himself. Simone talks with one of her father's friends who has connections to old counterfeiting rings and they are able to find the printer and capture the son when he attempts to kill another member of the embassy staff. Brandon struggles when his sobriety sponsor falls off the wagon, but Antoinette and Simone affirm that they will be there to support him. Naomi Voss encourages Simone to find a hobby to help herself relax.
19	"Burn Run"	Hernán Otaño	Jessica Flowers & Scott Kolp	March 28, 2023	119	2.88
With four months having passed since they joined the team, Simone and Brendon find themselves doing inventory work with Simone's office inventory work ultimately leading her to investigate the case of a dead woman which leads the team to a reclusive business tycoon as Laura and Brendon oversee a burn run- the process of evidence being burnt but things change when a thief steals some evidence and files and Carter finds himself searching for a way to prove Fortune is innocent.
20	"I Am Many"	Cheryl Dunye	Stacy A. Littlejohn & Nancy Kiu	April 18, 2023	120	2.24
Garza is contacted by Foster Mills, a serial killer on death row he arrested years ago, who mockingly informs Garza that further murders will take place, followed by a drone strike on an office releasing anthrax poison. The team determine that Mills was able to set up a cult of followers while in prison who are planning large-scale attacks on the day of his execution, while Mills sees as a means of ensuring his reputation lives in infamy. Simone confronts Mills and is able to determine how he was passing messages through to the outside world (codes in the prison library books after converting the librarian to his cause), and also trick him into revealing that his final target is the only person to escape his previous murder spree. Simone makes it clear she has no interest in hearing more of Mills' speeches and leaves him to face his execution and last meal.
21	"Bloodline"	Rob Seidenglanz	Alexi Hawley	April 25, 2023	121	2.49
Investigating severed human limbs taken from living bodies, the team determine that the limbs were removed by a rare industrial cutting tool. DNA analysis of the limbs reveals that the original victims were half-siblings; their father is Thomas Clay Briggs, a serial killer serving six life sentences, who donated sperm when he was a teenager. Although not in time to stop a third victim being claimed, the team identify the killer as Roman Griffith, one of Briggs' children, who has dealt with psychotic tendencies all his life and decided to kill his half-siblings on the chance that they have also inherited his father's tendencies. The team witness him outside the house of another half-sibling, Maggie Whitlock, but he departs despite confronting her young son Theo. Griffith abducts Laura to ask for her analysis on why he didn't kill Theo, but when she dismisses his justification, he attempts to kill her. She escapes and holds him off long enough for Brendan and a visiting Atlas to rescue her, but Griffith subsequently kills himself while claiming that any crimes committed by his other siblings are now Laura's responsibility. Note: This episode concludes a crossover event that begins on The Rookie season 5 episode 21.
22	"Red One"	Michael Goi	Terence Paul Winter	May 2, 2023	122	2.98
The season finale plunges Garza's unit into a high-stakes, discreet investigation. When an internal investigation agent is drugged and buried alive in the desert, the team is tasked with uncovering the truth, a mission that sidelines Simone's own birthday plans. The episode delivers the typical "Rookie" procedural drama with a heightened sense of urgency, tying up some loose ends.

== Production ==
=== Development ===
On February 8, 2022, it was announced that ABC was in the process of developing a spin-off of The Rookie centered around the FBI. It was also reported that the series would be introduced through a two-episode backdoor pilot in the parent series. At the time it was reported ABC was looking to expand its franchises after losing Black-ish, in an effort to compete with NBC's Chicago and Law & Order franchises as well as the FBI and NCIS franchises that air on CBS. On May 13, 2022, it was ordered to series under the title The Rookie: Feds. The Rookie creator Alex Hawley, co-created the series with Terence Paul Winter, both of whom also executive produce alongside Michelle Chapman, Bill Norcross, Corey Miller, star Niecy Nash, and The Rookie star Nathan Fillion. ABC Signature and Entertainment One serve as production companies. Entertainment One will also distribute the series internationally. On October 21, 2022, the series received a full season order, bringing up the season to a total of 22 episodes. On November 9, 2023, ABC canceled the series after one season.

=== Casting ===
Niecy Nash-Betts was the first to be cast as Simone Clark, "a tour de force and the oldest rookie at the FBI Academy." Kat Foster and Felix Solis were cast in March 2022 to portray Casey Fox and Matthew Garza, five- and twenty-year FBI veterans, respectively. Frankie Faison also joined the cast as Christopher "Cutty" Clark, Simone's father. When the series was ordered it was reported that Foster and her character Fox would not progress past the backdoor pilot. Britt Robertson joined the main cast in June 2022 to play Laura Stensen, a former member of the FBI behavioral analysis unit. Later that month, Kevin Zegers was cast as Brendon Acres, a former actor who recently joined the FBI. The following day, Deadline reported that James Lesure was also cast as Carter Hope, a former lawyer in the Department of Justice who is now training Clark. In September 2022, it was announced that Jessica Betts, Tom Arnold, Eric Roberts, and Deniz Akdeniz had been cast in guest-starring roles. Nathan Fillion and Alyssa Diaz appeared in the series premiere as John Nolan and Angela Lopez, respectively, their characters from The Rookie.

== Release ==
When ABC announced its fall schedule for the 2022–23 television season, it was revealed that the series would air on Tuesdays at 10:00 p.m. ET leading out of Bachelor in Paradise. ABC Entertainment President Craig Erwich defended the decision not to pair The Rookie: Feds with The Rookie, by saying that they wanted to keep The Rookie in its Sunday timeslot and that they felt that Bachelor in Paradise would be a strong lead-in for a new series. Erwich also stated that in spite of not airing together, crossovers between The Rookie and The Rookie: Feds would still be possible. The series aired from September 27, 2022, to May 2, 2023.

The Rookie: Feds would later be added to Disney+ in Australia and New Zealand as well as selected territories on November 1, 2025 following the previous addition of its parent show The Rookie earlier in the year, due to both shows being made by Disney's ABC Signature and a licensing agreement with EOne's parent company Lionsgate.

== Reception ==
=== Critical response ===
The review aggregator website Rotten Tomatoes reported an 86% approval rating with an average rating of 7.7/10, based on 7 critic reviews.

=== Ratings ===
Viewership and ratings per episode of The Rookie: Feds
No.	Title	Air date	Rating (18–49)	Viewers (millions)	DVR (18–49)	DVR viewers (millions)	Total (18–49)	Total viewers (millions)
1	"Day One"	September 27, 2022	0.3	2.28	0.3	2.13	0.6	4.31
2	"Face Off"	October 4, 2022	0.3	1.77	0.2	1.84	0.5	3.61
3	"Star Crossed"	October 11, 2022	0.2	1.57	0.2	1.90	0.5	3.48
4	"To Die For"	October 18, 2022	0.3	2.01	0.2	2.09	0.5	4.10
5	"Felicia"	October 25, 2022	0.2	1.87	0.2	1.96	0.5	3.83
6	"The Reaper"	November 1, 2022	0.3	1.81	0.2	1.76	0.4	3.57
7	"Countdown"	November 15, 2022	0.2	1.55	0.3	1.97	0.5	3.51
8	"Standoff"	November 22, 2022	0.2	1.74	—N/a	—N/a	—N/a	—N/a
9	"Flashback"	November 29, 2022	0.3	2.47	—N/a	—N/a	—N/a	—N/a
10	"The Silent Prisoner"	January 3, 2023	0.4	3.80	0.3	2.24	0.7	6.03
11	"Close Contact"	January 10, 2023	0.3	2.62	0.2	1.88	0.5	4.50
12	"Out for Blood"	January 17, 2023	0.4	2.99	0.2	1.67	0.6	4.66
13	"The Remora"	January 24, 2023	0.4	2.81	—N/a	—N/a	—N/a	—N/a
14	"The Offer"	January 31, 2023	0.3	3.19	—N/a	—N/a	—N/a	—N/a
15	"Dead Again"	February 14, 2023	0.3	2.62	—N/a	—N/a	—N/a	—N/a
16	"For Love and Money"	February 21, 2023	0.3	2.60	—N/a	—N/a	—N/a	—N/a
17	"Payback"	February 28, 2023	0.3	2.80	—N/a	—N/a	—N/a	—N/a
18	"Seeing Red"	March 21, 2023	0.3	2.30	—N/a	—N/a	—N/a	—N/a
19	"Burn Run"	March 28, 2023	0.3	2.88	—N/a	—N/a	—N/a	—N/a
20	"I Am Many"	April 18, 2023	0.3	2.24	—N/a	—N/a	—N/a	—N/a
21	"Bloodline"	April 25, 2023	0.2	2.49	—N/a	—N/a	—N/a	—N/a
22	"Red One"	May 2, 2023	0.3	2.98	—N/a	—N/a	—N/a	—N/a
