= Robert Bella =

American actor

- Born: Robert Bella; Brooklyn, New York, United States
- Occupations: Filmmaker, Director, Producer, Writer, Actor
- Years active: 1985–present

Robert Bella is an American filmmaker, best known for his work as a television Director, Writer & Producer on shows such as The Rookie, The Rookie: Feds, Castle and The Following. Bella has also worked on over 100 plays as an actor, director, producer and writer. He is a co-author of Training of the American Actor, and he wrote the stage adaptation of the film Stand and Deliver.

== Early life ==
Bella was born in Brooklyn, New York. He received a Bachelor of Fine Arts from the Tisch School of the Arts at New York University, where he studied acting with Stella Adler, David Mamet and William H. Macy.

== Career ==
When he was 23 years old, Bella became an NYU adjunct faculty member. By the time he was 25, he was teaching Master Classes around the world, on subjects such as directing, script analysis, performance technique, on-camera acting and audition skills. His former acting students include Jessica Alba, Rose Byrne, Heather Burns, Eddie Cahill, Justin Chatwin, Abbie Cornish, Peter Facinelli, Matthew Fox, Bryan Greenberg, Simon Helberg, Diane Neal, Jason Ritter, Gina Rodriguez, Shaun Sipos, and Skeet Ulrich.

Bella became one of the founding members the Atlantic Theater Company, where he served as the managing director, Associate Artistic Director and executive Director of the Atlantic Acting School. His experience producing and directing numerous Off-Broadway plays ultimately led him to try his hand at filmmaking.

=== TV and film ===
In 1996, Bella produced and directed the independent film Colin Fitz Lives!. The film tells the story of two security guards who must protect a rock star's grave against excitable fans who may attempt suicide there. It was shot on 35mm in New York City. The budget was $150,000, and the film was shot in 14 days. It had its World Premiere in Dramatic Competition at the 1997 Sundance Film Festival. The film won awards at numerous film festivals, including the Austin Film Festival, WorldFest-Houston International Film Festival and the Long Island Film Festival, but it did not receive distribution until IFC Films released the movie on-demand in 2010.

Bella has worked as an ADR Director with numerous actors, including: Chevy Chase, Judi Dench, Jimmy Fallon, Whoopi Goldberg, Bill Hader, Freddie Highmore, Harvey Keitel, William H. Macy, James McAvoy, Catherine O'Hara, Christina Ricci and Jon Stewart.

Bella also worked as a Post Production Supervisor for various film studios, including DreamWorks Pictures. His credits include Delivery Man, Lincoln, War Horse, Real Steel, The Help and I Am Number Four, and he has worked as a TV Director/Writer/Producer on shows such as The Rookie, The Rookie: Feds, Castle and The Following.

== Personal life ==
Bella is currently resides in Los Angeles, California.

== Filmography ==
Year	Film & Television	Credited as							Notes
Year	Film & Television	Director	Executive producer	Producer	Post production	Writer	Actor	Role	Notes
1988	Things Change						Yes	Bellboy #1	Written and Directed by David Mamet.
1991	Homicide						Yes	Bodyguard	Written and Directed by David Mamet.
1993	Hitsville						Yes	Mick	Written and Directed by Peter Biegen.
1993	Amid Summer's Night Dreams						Yes	Skip	Written and Directed by Glen Gers.
1993	The Contenders						Yes	Skip	Written and Directed by Tobias Meinecke.
1993	Money for Nothing						Yes	Junior Bookie	Written and Directed by Ramón Menéndez.
1997	Colin Fitz Lives!	Yes		Yes	Yes		Yes	Pepe	In 2010, IFC Films released the film as part of: Sundance Selects – Colin Fitz Lives!.
1997	Gerald's Farm						Yes	Chris	Short Film. Written and Directed by Jonathan Abrahams.
1999	Magnolia						Yes	Detective #2 (uncredited)	Written and Directed by Paul Thomas Anderson.
2004	Spartan						Yes	Davio	Written and Directed by David Mamet.
2005	This Revolution						Yes	Bob Kramer	Written and Directed by Stephen Marshall.
2006	Knot						Yes	Dad	Short film.
2006	Doogal aka The Magic Roundabout	Yes			Yes				US Voice Director for The Weinstein Company.
2006	Penelope				Yes				Post Production Supervisor for Summit Entertainment and The Weinstein Company.
2006	Factory Girl				Yes				Post Production Supervisor for The Weinstein Company.
2007	Elite Squad				Yes				Post Production Supervisor for The Weinstein Company.
2008	The Promotion				Yes				Post Production Supervisor for Dimension Films.
2008	Revengers, Inc.	Yes		Yes	Yes	Yes	Yes	Mr. G	NYU UG Drama Department film project.
2009	Fanboys				Yes				Post Production Supervisor for The Weinstein Company.
2009	Road Kill: A Day in the Life of Henry David Road	Yes	Yes		Yes	Yes	Yes	Henry David Road	World Premiere at the 2009 Palm Springs International Festival of Short Films.
2009	Fighting				Yes				Post Production Supervisor for Relativity Media and Rogue Pictures.
2010	My Soul To Take				Yes				Post Production Supervisor for Relativity Media and Rogue Pictures. Written and Directed by Wes Craven.
2011	I Am Number Four				Yes				Post Production Supervisor for Bay Films and DreamWorks Pictures. Produced by Michael Bay. Directed by D. J. Caruso.
2011	The Help				Yes				Post Production Supervisor for DreamWorks Pictures. Written and Directed by Tate Taylor.
2011	Real Steel				Yes				Post Production Consultant for DreamWorks Pictures. Produced and Directed by Shawn Levy. Starring Hugh Jackman.
2011	War Horse				Yes				Post Production Consultant for DreamWorks Pictures. Produced and Directed by Steven Spielberg.
2012	Lincoln				Yes				Post Production Consultant for DreamWorks Pictures. Produced and Directed by Steven Spielberg.
2013	Best Friends Forever		Yes		Yes				World Premiere at the 2013 Slamdance Film Festival. Directed by Brea Grant.
2013	Delivery Man				Yes				Post Production Supervisor for DreamWorks Pictures. Written and Directed by Ken Scott.
2014	Need for Speed				Yes				Post Production Consultant for DreamWorks Pictures. Directed by Scott Waugh.
2014	The Hundred-Foot Journey				Yes				Post Production Consultant for DreamWorks Pictures. Directed by Lasse Hallström.
2015	The Following					Yes			Staff Writer (Season 3) for Warner Bros. Television. Created by Kevin Williamson.
2015–2016	Castle					Yes			Staff Writer (Season 8) for ABC. Created by Andrew W. Marlowe.
2018–	The Rookie	Yes		Yes		Yes			Director/Writer/Producer (Seasons 1–4) for ABC. Created by Alexi Hawley.
2022–2023	The Rookie: Feds	Yes							Director; 2 episodes

== Theater ==
Year	Play	Credited as					Notes
Year	Play	Theatre Director	Theatrical producer	Playwright	Actor	Role	Notes
1985	The Water Engine				Yes	Mr. Wallace, Understudy	Presented by The Goodman Theatre. Written by David Mamet.
1985	Home Free!	Yes	Yes		Yes	Lawrence	Written by Lanford Wilson.
1986	Been Taken		Yes				Presented by The Atlantic Theater Company. Directed by William H. Macy.
1986	After Magritte		Yes				Presented by The Atlantic Theater Company. Written by Tom Stoppard.
1986	A Night Out		Yes				Presented by The Atlantic Theater Company. Written by Harold Pinter.
1987	Knuckle	Yes	Yes				Presented by The Atlantic Theater Company. Written by David Hare.
1987	The Woods		Yes				Presented by The Atlantic Theater Company. Written by David Mamet.
1987	Audrey's Complaint		Yes				World Premiere. Presented by The Atlantic Theater Company. Written by Tom Donaghy. Directed by Clark Gregg.
1987	Reckless		Yes				Presented by The Atlantic Theater Company. Written by Craig Lucas.
1987	Boys' Life		Yes		Yes	Don, Understudy	World Premiere. Presented by The Atlantic Theater Company. Written by Howard Korder. Directed by William H. Macy. Off-Broadway Premiere presented by The Lincoln Center for the Performing Arts.
1989	True West	Yes					Off-Off Broadway. Written by Sam Shepard.
1989	Measure for Measure				Yes	Varrius	Presented by The Lincoln Center for the Performing Arts. Starring: Kate Burton and Campbell Scott.
1989	Julius Caesar	Yes					Off-Off Broadway. Written by William Shakespeare.
1990	Spike Heels	Yes					Off-Off Broadway. Written by Theresa Rebeck.
1991	Anton Chekhov's Three Sisters				Yes	Solyony	Presented by The Atlantic Theater Company. Adapted by David Mamet. Directed by William H. Macy.
1991	The Virgin Molly				Yes	Pvt. Molly Peterson	Presented by The Atlantic Theater Company.
1992	Mad Forest	Yes					Off-Off Broadway. Written by Caryl Churchill.
1994	The Crucible	Yes					Off-Off Broadway. Written by Arthur Miller.
1994	Stand and Deliver			Yes			Adapted from the film Stand and Deliver.
1995	Oleanna				Yes	John, Understudy.	National Tour. Written by David Mamet.
1995	J. B. Priestley's Dangerous Corner				Yes	Gordon	Presented by The Atlantic Theater Company. Adapted and Directed by David Mamet.
1997	Trust	Yes			Yes	Roy	Sydney, Australia. Written by Steven Dietz.
2001	The Front Page	Yes					Off-Off Broadway. Written by Ben Hecht and Charles MacArthur.
2001	The Dog Problem				Yes	The Priest	Presented by The Atlantic Theater Company. Written by David Rabe.
2002	Balm in Gilead	Yes					Off-Off Broadway. Written by Lanford Wilson.
2004	Unidentified Human Remains and the True Nature of Love	Yes					Off Broadway. Written by Brad Fraser.

== Awards and nominations ==
- Film Festival Awards
  - Gold Award: Won, 1997, for Comedy
  - Grand Jury Prize: Nomination, 1997, for Dramatic
  - Best of Fest: Won, 1997, for Feature Film Competition
  - Grand Jury Award: Nomination, 1997, for Narrative
  - Feature Film Award: Nomination, 1997 (shared with Tom Morrissey)
  - Feature Film Award: Won, 1997, for Best Feature
  - Audience Award: Won, 1997.
