= List of Chicago Fire episodes =

American procedural drama series parts

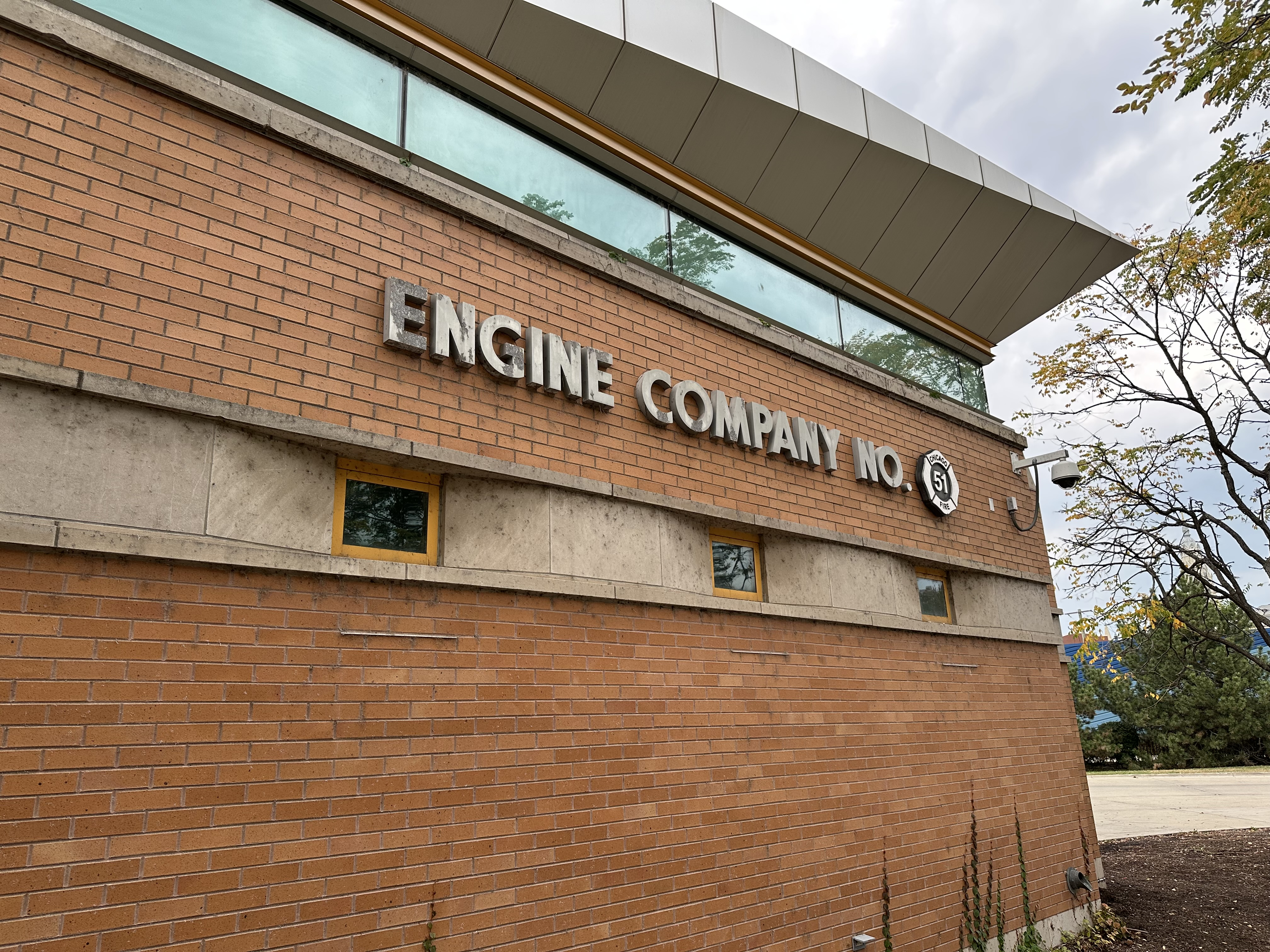
The actual Chicago Fire Department station Engine 18 doubles as the fictional Firehouse 51 for Chicago Fire and here has the '51' number on it for filming

Chicago Fire is an American television drama created by Michael Brandt and Derek Haas, who serve as executive producers alongside Joe Chappelle, Peter Jankowski, Danielle Gelber, Matt Olmstead and Dick Wolf. The series, which premiered on October 10, 2012, airs on NBC. The series follows the lives of the firefighters and paramedics working at the Chicago Fire Department at the firehouse of Engine Company 51, Truck Company 81, Rescue Squad Company 3, Ambulance 61 and Battalion 25, starring Jesse Spencer as Lieutenant Matthew Casey, Taylor Kinney as Lieutenant Kelly Severide, Yuri Sardarov as firefighter Brian "Otis" Zvonecek who left after the eighth-season premiere, Charlie Barnett as firefighter candidate Peter Mills, who left the series in the third-season episode "You Know Where to Find Me", Monica Raymund as Paramedic in Charge Gabriela Dawson, who left in the seventh-season premiere, Lauren German as Paramedic Leslie Elizabeth Shay, who left after the third-season premiere, Eamonn Walker as Deputy District Chief (formerly Battalion Chief) Wallace Boden, David Eigenberg as firefighter Christopher Herrmann, and Teri Reeves as Dr. Hallie Thomas. Other characters joined the series in later seasons.

In March 2024, the series was renewed for a thirteenth season which premiered on September 25, 2024. In May 2025, the series was renewed for a fourteenth season which premiered on October 1, 2025.

As of November 18, 2026, 302 episodes of Chicago Fire have aired, currently in its fifteenth season.

== Series overview ==
| Season | Episodes | Originally released | | Rank | Average viewers (million) |
| Season | Episodes | First released | Last released | Rank | Average viewers (million) |
|---|---|---|---|---|---|
| 1 | 24 | October 10, 2012 | May 22, 2013 | 51 | 7.78 |
| 2 | 22 | September 24, 2013 | May 13, 2014 | 31 | 9.70 |
| 3 | 23 | September 23, 2014 | May 12, 2015 | 47 | 9.65 |
| 4 | 23 | October 13, 2015 | May 17, 2016 | 31 | 10.47 |
| 5 | 22 | October 11, 2016 | May 16, 2017 | 26 | 9.92 |
| 6 | 23 | September 28, 2017 | May 10, 2018 | 29 | 9.67 |
| 7 | 22 | September 26, 2018 | May 22, 2019 | 14 | 11.37 |
| 8 | 20 | September 25, 2019 | April 15, 2020 | 8 | 11.70 |
| 9 | 16 | November 11, 2020 | May 26, 2021 | 7 | 10.23 |
| 10 | 22 | September 22, 2021 | May 25, 2022 | 5 | 9.84 |
| 11 | 22 | September 21, 2022 | May 24, 2023 | 7 | 9.25 |
| 12 | 13 | January 17, 2024 | May 22, 2024 | 7 | 8.68 |
| 13 | 22 | September 25, 2024 | May 21, 2025 | 13 | 10.22 |
| 14 | 21 | October 1, 2025 | May 13, 2026 | 11 | 9.80 |
| 15 | 21 | October 7, 2026 | TBA | TBA | TBA |

== Episodes ==
=== Season 1 (2012–13) ===
| No. overall | No. in season | Title | Directed by | Written by | Original release date | Prod. code | U.S. viewers (millions) |
|---|---|---|---|---|---|---|---|
| 1 | 1 | "Pilot" | Jeffrey Nachmanoff | Michael Brandt & Derek Haas | October 10, 2012 | 101 | 6.61 |
| 2 | 2 | "Mon Amour" | Tom DiCillo | Michael Brandt & Derek Haas | October 17, 2012 | 102 | 5.85 |
| 3 | 3 | "Professional Courtesy" | Joe Chappelle | Matt Olmstead | October 24, 2012 | 103 | 6.42 |
| 4 | 4 | "One Minute" | Gloria Muzio | Andrea Newman | October 31, 2012 | 104 | 5.62 |
| 5 | 5 | "Hanging On" | Jean de Segonzac | Marc Dube | November 7, 2012 | 105 | 7.03 |
| 6 | 6 | "Rear View Mirror" | Joe Chappelle | Thania St. John | November 14, 2012 | 106 | 5.77 |
| 7 | 7 | "Two Families" | Michael Slovis | Michael Brandt & Derek Haas | November 21, 2012 | 107 | 5.55 |
| 8 | 8 | "Leaving the Station" | Constantine Makris | Bryan Oh | December 5, 2012 | 108 | 7.21 |
| 9 | 9 | "It Ain't Easy" | Tom DiCillo | Hilly Hicks, Jr. | December 12, 2012 | 109 | 4.87 |
| 10 | 10 | "Merry Christmas, Etc." | Steve Shill | Michael Gilvary | December 19, 2012 | 110 | 6.75 |
| 11 | 11 | "God Has Spoken" | Daniel Sackheim | Andrea Newman & Marc Dube | January 2, 2013 | 111 | 8.54 |
| 12 | 12 | "Under the Knife" | Alex Chapple | Matt Olmstead & Ryan Rege Harris | January 9, 2013 | 112 | 8.04 |
| 13 | 13 | "Warm and Dead" | Alik Sakharov | Michael Brandt & Derek Haas | January 30, 2013 | 113 | 7.31 |
| 14 | 14 | "A Little Taste" | Arthur W. Forney | Matt Olmstead & Hilly Hicks, Jr. | February 6, 2013 | 114 | 6.60 |
| 15 | 15 | "Nazdarovya!" | Joe Chappelle | Andrea Newman | February 13, 2013 | 115 | 6.65 |
| 16 | 16 | "Viral" | Michael Brandt | Michael Gilvary | February 20, 2013 | 116 | 6.50 |
| 17 | 17 | "Better to Lie" | Joe Chappelle | Matt Olmstead & Ryan Rege Harris | February 27, 2013 | 117 | 6.62 |
| 18 | 18 | "Fireworks" | Karen Gaviola | Tim Talbott | March 20, 2013 | 118 | 6.39 |
| 19 | 19 | "A Coffin That Small" | Darnell Martin | Story by : Steve Chickerotis; Teleplay by : Michael Brandt & Derek Haas | March 27, 2013 | 119 | 6.85 |
| 20 | 20 | "Ambition" | Arthur W. Forney | Andrea Newman & Michael Gilvary | April 3, 2013 | 120 | 6.37 |
| 21 | 21 | "Retaliation Hit" | Jean de Segonzac | Matt Olmstead & Hilly Hicks, Jr. | May 1, 2013 | 121 | 6.35 |
| 22 | 22 | "Leaders Lead" | Michael Slovis | Story by : Dick Wolf & Matt Olmstead; Teleplay by : Michael Brandt & Derek Haas | May 8, 2013 | 122 | 6.89 |
| 23 | 23 | "Let Her Go" | Joe Chappelle | Story by : Dick Wolf & Matt Olmstead; Teleplay by : Michael Brandt & Derek Haas | May 15, 2013 | 123 | 6.90 |
| 24 | 24 | "A Hell of a Ride" | Alex Chapple | Andrea Newman & Michael Gilvary | May 22, 2013 | 124 | 6.13 |

=== Season 2 (2013–14) ===
| No. overall | No. in season | Title | Directed by | Written by | Original release date | Prod. code | U.S. viewers (millions) |
|---|---|---|---|---|---|---|---|
| 25 | 1 | "A Problem House" | Joe Chappelle | Michael Brandt & Derek Haas | September 24, 2013 | 201 | 8.90 |
| 26 | 2 | "Prove It" | Tom DiCillo | Andrea Newman | October 1, 2013 | 202 | 8.74 |
| 27 | 3 | "Defcon 1" | Joe Chappelle | Michael Gilvary | October 8, 2013 | 203 | 7.43 |
| 28 | 4 | "A Nuisance Call" | Steve Shill | Matt Olmstead & Hilly Hicks, Jr. | October 15, 2013 | 204 | 8.08 |
| 29 | 5 | "A Power Move" | Jann Turner | Andi Bushell | October 22, 2013 | 205 | 7.45 |
| 30 | 6 | "Joyriding" | Steve Shill | Derek Haas & Tim Talbott | November 12, 2013 | 206 | 7.66 |
| 31 | 7 | "No Regrets" | Michael Slovis | Michael Brandt & Ryan Rege Harris | November 19, 2013 | 207 | 7.49 |
| 32 | 8 | "Rhymes with Shout" | Joe Chappelle | Andrea Newman | November 26, 2013 | 208 | 6.91 |
| 33 | 9 | "You Will Hurt Him" | Sanford Bookstaver | Michael Gilvary | December 3, 2013 | 209 | 8.22 |
| 34 | 10 | "Not Like This" | Alex Chapple | Michael Brandt & Derek Haas | December 10, 2013 | 210 | 9.32 |
| 35 | 11 | "Shoved in My Face" | Jean de Segonzac | Hilly Hicks, Jr. | January 7, 2014 | 211 | 6.87 |
| 36 | 12 | "Out with a Bang" | Alik Sakharov | Andrea Newman | January 14, 2014 | 212 | 6.76 |
| 37 | 13 | "Tonight's the Night" | Jann Turner | Derek Haas & Tim Talbott | January 21, 2014 | 213 | 7.13 |
| 38 | 14 | "Virgin Skin" | Karen Gaviola | Michael Brandt & Ryan Rege Harris | February 25, 2014 | 214 | 7.06 |
| 39 | 15 | "Keep Your Mouth Shut" | Holly Dale | Michael Gilvary | March 4, 2014 | 215 | 7.07 |
| 40 | 16 | "A Rocket Blasting Off" | Sanford Bookstaver | Matt Olmstead & Hilly Hicks, Jr. | March 11, 2014 | 216 | 7.21 |
| 41 | 17 | "When Things Got Rough" | Jann Turner | Andrea Newman | March 18, 2014 | 217 | 6.96 |
| 42 | 18 | "Until Your Feet Leave the Ground" | Michael Slovis | Matt Olmstead & Mick Betancourt | April 8, 2014 | 218 | 6.96 |
| 43 | 19 | "A Heavy Weight" | Reza Tabrizi | Michael Gilvary | April 15, 2014 | 219 | 6.90 |
| 44 | 20 | "A Dark Day" | Joe Chappelle | Story by : Dick Wolf & Matt Olmstead; Teleplay by : Michael Brandt & Derek Haas | April 29, 2014 | 220 | 7.06 |
| 45 | 21 | "One More Shot" | Jean de Segonzac | Andrea Newman | May 6, 2014 | 221 | 6.92 |
| 46 | 22 | "Real Never Waits" | Michael Brandt | Michael Brandt & Derek Haas | May 13, 2014 | 222 | 7.12 |

=== Season 3 (2014–15) ===
| No. overall | No. in season | Title | Directed by | Written by | Original release date | Prod. code | U.S. viewers (millions) |
|---|---|---|---|---|---|---|---|
| 47 | 1 | "Always" | Joe Chappelle | Michael Brandt & Derek Haas | September 23, 2014 | 301 | 9.14 |
| 48 | 2 | "Wow Me" | Tom DiCillo | Andrea Newman | September 30, 2014 | 302 | 8.71 |
| 49 | 3 | "Just Drive the Truck" | Sanford Bookstaver | Michael Gilvary | October 7, 2014 | 303 | 8.39 |
| 50 | 4 | "Apologies Are Dangerous" | Steve Shill | Michael Brandt & Ryan Rege Harris | October 14, 2014 | 304 | 7.11 |
| 51 | 5 | "The Nuclear Option" | Joe Chappelle | Tim Talbott | October 21, 2014 | 305 | 7.45 |
| 52 | 6 | "Madmen and Fools" | Rod Holcomb | Tiller Russell | October 28, 2014 | 306 | 7.23 |
| 53 | 7 | "Nobody Touches Anything" | Alex Chapple | Story by : Dick Wolf & Jill Weinberger; Teleplay by : Matt Olmstead & Jill Weinberger | November 11, 2014 | 307 | 9.06 |
| 54 | 8 | "Chopper" | Jann Turner | Derek Haas & Michael A. O'Shea | November 18, 2014 | 308 | 7.75 |
| 55 | 9 | "Arrest in Transit" | Jean de Segonzac | Andrea Newman | November 25, 2014 | 309 | 6.02 |
| 56 | 10 | "Santa Bites" | Holly Dale | Michael Brandt & Derek Haas | December 2, 2014 | 310 | 7.36 |
| 57 | 11 | "Let Him Die" | Steve Shill | Michael Gilvary | January 6, 2015 | 311 | 6.77 |
| 58 | 12 | "Ambush Predator" | Joe Chappelle | Story by : Steve Chikerotis & Tiller Russell; Teleplay by : Tiller Russell | January 13, 2015 | 312 | 6.66 |
| 59 | 13 | "Three Bells" | Arthur W. Forney | Jill Weinberger | February 3, 2015 | 313 | 6.52 |
| 60 | 14 | "Call It Paradise" | Reza Tabrizi | Matt Olmstead & Michael A. O'Shea | February 10, 2015 | 314 | 6.29 |
| 61 | 15 | "Headlong Toward Disaster" | Joe Chappelle | Michael Gilvary | February 17, 2015 | 315 | 6.26 |
| 62 | 16 | "Red Rag the Bull" | Sanford Bookstaver | Tiller Russell | March 3, 2015 | 316 | 9.07 |
| 63 | 17 | "Forgive You Anything" | Reza Tabrizi | Story by : Dick Wolf & Matt Olmstead; Teleplay by : Andrea Newman | March 10, 2015 | 317 | 8.57 |
| 64 | 18 | "Forgiving, Relentless, Unconditional" | Karyn Kusama | Michael A. O'Shea & Jill Weinberger | March 17, 2015 | 318 | 6.96 |
| 65 | 19 | "I Am the Apocalypse" | Joe Chappelle | Story by : Dick Wolf & Matt Olmstead; Teleplay by : Michael Brandt & Derek Haas | April 7, 2015 | 319 | 8.43 |
| 66 | 20 | "You Know Where to Find Me" | Jean de Segonzac | Michael Gilvary | April 21, 2015 | 320 | 6.72 |
| 67 | 21 | "We Called Her Jellybean" | Joe Chappelle | Story by : Matt Olmstead & Tiller Russell; Teleplay by : Tiller Russell | April 28, 2015 | 321 | 6.85 |
| 68 | 22 | "Category 5" | Dan Lerner | Andrea Newman | May 5, 2015 | 322 | 6.76 |
| 69 | 23 | "Spartacus" | Michael Brandt | Michael Brandt & Derek Haas | May 12, 2015 | 323 | 6.66 |

=== Season 4 (2015–16) ===
| No. overall | No. in season | Title | Directed by | Written by | Original release date | Prod. code | U.S. viewers (millions) |
|---|---|---|---|---|---|---|---|
| 70 | 1 | "Let It Burn" | Joe Chappelle | Andrea Newman & Michael Gilvary | October 13, 2015 | 401 | 7.37 |
| 71 | 2 | "A Taste of Panama City" | Sanford Bookstaver | Tiller Russell | October 20, 2015 | 402 | 7.64 |
| 72 | 3 | "I Walk Away" | Tom DiCillo | Sarah Kucserka & Veronica West | October 27, 2015 | 403 | 7.80 |
| 73 | 4 | "Your Day Is Coming" | Reza Tabrizi | Jill Weinberger | November 3, 2015 | 404 | 8.11 |
| 74 | 5 | "Regarding This Wedding" | Joe Chappelle | Michael A. O'Shea | November 10, 2015 | 405 | 8.15 |
| 75 | 6 | "2112" | Holly Dale | Ian McCulloch | November 17, 2015 | 406 | 7.95 |
| 76 | 7 | "Sharp Elbows" | Dan Lerner | Tiller Russell & Liz Alper & Ally Seibert | November 24, 2015 | 407 | 7.34 |
| 77 | 8 | "When Tortoises Fly" | Haze Bergeron | Michael Gilvary | December 1, 2015 | 408 | 8.62 |
| 78 | 9 | "Short and Fat" | Joe Chappelle | Michael Brandt & Derek Haas | December 8, 2015 | 409 | 9.13 |
| 79 | 10 | "The Beating Heart" | Reza Tabrizi | Andrea Newman | January 5, 2016 | 410 | 7.43 |
| 80 | 11 | "The Path of Destruction" | Drucilla Carlson | Sarah Kucserka & Veronica West | January 19, 2016 | 411 | 8.16 |
| 81 | 12 | "Not Everyone Makes It" | Reza Tabrizi | Tiller Russell | January 26, 2016 | 412 | 8.46 |
| 82 | 13 | "The Sky Is Falling" | Joe Chappelle | Michael Brandt & Michael A. O'Shea | February 2, 2016 | 413 | 8.18 |
| 83 | 14 | "All Hard Parts" | Sanford Bookstaver | Jill Weinberger | February 9, 2016 | 414 | 8.13 |
| 84 | 15 | "Bad For the Soul" | Jann Turner | Andrea Newman & Michael Gilvary | February 16, 2016 | 415 | 7.53 |
| 85 | 16 | "Two Ts" | Reza Tabrizi | Derek Haas & Ian McCulloch | February 23, 2016 | 416 | 7.80 |
| 86 | 17 | "What Happened to Courtney" | Jeffrey Hunt | Story by : Matt Olmstead; Teleplay by : Liz Alper & Ally Seibert | March 29, 2016 | 417 | 8.66 |
| 87 | 18 | "On the Warpath" | Joe Chappelle | Sarah Kucserka & Veronica West | April 5, 2016 | 418 | 7.68 |
| 88 | 19 | "I Will Be Walking" | Sanford Bookstaver | Tiller Russell | April 19, 2016 | 419 | 8.17 |
| 89 | 20 | "The Last One for Mom" | Fred Berner | Story by : Matt Olmstead; Teleplay by : Gwen Sigan | April 26, 2016 | 420 | 8.22 |
| 90 | 21 | "Kind of a Crazy Idea" | Joe Chappelle | Andrea Newman & Michael Gilvary | May 3, 2016 | 421 | 7.79 |
| 91 | 22 | "Where the Collapse Started" | Sanford Bookstaver | Sarah Kucserka & Veronica West | May 10, 2016 | 422 | 7.98 |
| 92 | 23 | "Superhero" | Michael Brandt | Story by : Ian McCulloch & Michael A. O'Shea; Teleplay by : Michael Brandt & Derek Haas | May 17, 2016 | 423 | 7.91 |

=== Season 5 (2016–17) ===
| No. overall | No. in season | Title | Directed by | Written by | Original release date | Prod. code | U.S. viewers (millions) |
|---|---|---|---|---|---|---|---|
| 93 | 1 | "The Hose or the Animal" | Joe Chappelle | Michael Brandt & Derek Haas | October 11, 2016 | 501 | 7.52 |
| 94 | 2 | "A Real Wake-Up Call" | Reza Tabrizi | Andrea Newman & Michael Gilvary | October 18, 2016 | 502 | 7.40 |
| 95 | 3 | "Scorched Earth" | Joe Chappelle | Sarah Kucserka & Veronica West | October 25, 2016 | 503 | 6.93 |
| 96 | 4 | "Nobody Else is Dying Today" | Sanford Bookstaver | Jill Weinberger | November 1, 2016 | 504 | 6.65 |
| 97 | 5 | "I Held Her Hand" | Reza Tabrizi | Roger Grant | November 15, 2016 | 505 | 6.99 |
| 98 | 6 | "That Day" | Dan Lerner | Michael A. O'Shea | November 22, 2016 | 506 | 6.48 |
| 99 | 7 | "Lift Each Other" | Alex Chapple | Liz Alper & Ally Seibert | November 29, 2016 | 507 | 7.94 |
| 100 | 8 | "One Hundred" | Joe Chappelle | Michael Brandt & Derek Haas | December 6, 2016 | 508 | 7.77 |
| 101 | 9 | "Some Make It, Some Don't" | Drucilla Carlson | Andrea Newman | January 3, 2017 | 509 | 7.62 |
| 102 | 10 | "The People We Meet" | David Rodriguez | Sarah Kucserka & Veronica West | January 17, 2017 | 510 | 7.15 |
| 103 | 11 | "Who Lives and Who Dies" | Haze J. F. Bergeron III | Michael Gilvary | January 24, 2017 | 511 | 7.38 |
| 104 | 12 | "An Agent of the Machine" | Jann Turner | Jill Weinberger | February 7, 2017 | 512 | 6.87 |
| 105 | 13 | "Trading in Scuttlebutt" | Reza Tabrizi | Roger Grant | February 14, 2017 | 513 | 6.77 |
| 106 | 14 | "Purgatory" | Joe Chappelle | Michael Brandt & Derek Haas | February 21, 2017 | 514 | 7.16 |
| 107 | 15 | "Deathtrap" | Joe Chappelle | Andrea Newman | March 1, 2017 | 515 | 9.01 |
| 108 | 16 | "Telling Her Goodbye" | Reza Tabrizi | Michael A. O'Shea | March 21, 2017 | 516 | 7.21 |
| 109 | 17 | "Babies and Fools" | Holly Dale | Michael Gilvary & Liz Alper & Ally Seibert | March 28, 2017 | 517 | 6.68 |
| 110 | 18 | "Take a Knee" | Joe Chappelle | Michael Brandt & Derek Haas | April 4, 2017 | 518 | 6.29 |
| 111 | 19 | "Carry Their Legacy" | Reza Tabrizi | Michael A. O'Shea | April 25, 2017 | 519 | 6.91 |
| 112 | 20 | "Carry Me" | Eric Laneuville | Jill Weinberger | May 2, 2017 | 520 | 6.08 |
| 113 | 21 | "Sixty Days" | Sanford Bookstaver | Michael Gilvary | May 9, 2017 | 521 | 5.92 |
| 114 | 22 | "My Miracle" | Michael Brandt | Michael Brandt & Derek Haas | May 16, 2017 | 522 | 6.30 |

=== Season 6 (2017–18) ===
| No. overall | No. in season | Title | Directed by | Written by | Original release date | Prod. code | U.S. viewers (millions) |
|---|---|---|---|---|---|---|---|
| 115 | 1 | "It Wasn't Enough" | Reza Tabrizi | Derek Haas | September 28, 2017 | 601 | 7.19 |
| 116 | 2 | "Ignite on Contact" | John Hyams | Andrea Newman | October 5, 2017 | 602 | 6.13 |
| 117 | 3 | "An Even Bigger Surprise" | Sanford Bookstaver | Jill Weinberger | October 12, 2017 | 603 | 6.16 |
| 118 | 4 | "A Breaking Point" | Matt Earl Beesley | Michael A. O'Shea | October 19, 2017 | 604 | 6.35 |
| 119 | 5 | "Devil's Bargain" | Jono Oliver | Michael Gilvary | October 26, 2017 | 605 | 6.55 |
| 120 | 6 | "Down Is Better" | Reza Tabrizi | Derek Haas | November 2, 2017 | 606 | 5.88 |
| 121 | 7 | "A Man's Legacy" | Joe Chappelle | Alvaro Rodriguez | January 4, 2018 | 607 | 5.96 |
| 122 | 8 | "The Whole Point of Being Roommates" | Stephen Cragg | Jamila Daniel | January 11, 2018 | 608 | 5.30 |
| 123 | 9 | "Foul Is Fair" | Sanford Bookstaver | Derek Haas | January 18, 2018 | 609 | 5.68 |
| 124 | 10 | "Slamigan" | Bill Johnson | Andrea Newman | January 25, 2018 | 610 | 6.06 |
| 125 | 11 | "Law of the Jungle" | Reza Tabrizi | Michael A. O'Shea | February 1, 2018 | 611 | 5.67 |
| 126 | 12 | "The F Is For" | James Hanlon | Jill Weinberger | March 1, 2018 | 612 | 5.67 |
| 127 | 13 | "Hiding Not Seeking" | Leslie Libman | Derek Haas & Andrea Newman & Michael Gilvary | March 8, 2018 | 613 | 6.24 |
| 128 | 14 | "Looking for a Lifeline" | Joe Chappelle | Derek Haas | March 22, 2018 | 614 | 6.88 |
| 129 | 15 | "The Chance to Forgive" | Reza Tabrizi | Michael A. O'Shea & Jamila Daniel | March 22, 2018 | 615 | 6.88 |
| 130 | 16 | "The One that Matters the Most" | Bill Johnson | Michael Gilvary | March 29, 2018 | 616 | 5.42 |
| 131 | 17 | "Put White on Me" | Matt Earl Beesley | Story by : Jill Weinberger; Teleplay by : Derek Haas | April 5, 2018 | 617 | 5.48 |
| 132 | 18 | "When They See Us Coming" | Lin Oeding | Andrea Newman & Michael Gilvary | April 12, 2018 | 618 | 5.64 |
| 133 | 19 | "Where I Want to Be" | Eric Laneuville | Michael A. O'Shea | April 19, 2018 | 619 | 5.39 |
| 134 | 20 | "The Strongest Among Us" | Reza Tabrizi | Derek Haas | April 26, 2018 | 620 | 5.55 |
| 135 | 21 | "The Unrivaled Standard" | Joe Chappelle | Jeff Drayer | May 3, 2018 | 621 | 5.54 |
| 136 | 22 | "One for the Ages" | Leslie Libman | Michael Gilvary & Andrea Newman | May 10, 2018 | 622 | 5.95 |
| 137 | 23 | "The Grand Gesture" | Reza Tabrizi | Derek Haas | May 10, 2018 | 623 | 5.95 |

=== Season 7 (2018–19) ===
| No. overall | No. in season | Title | Directed by | Written by | Original release date | Prod. code | U.S. viewers (millions) |
|---|---|---|---|---|---|---|---|
| 138 | 1 | "A Closer Eye" | Sanford Bookstaver | Derek Haas | September 26, 2018 | 701 | 8.08 |
| 139 | 2 | "Going to War" | Reza Tabrizi | Andrea Newman & Michael Gilvary | October 3, 2018 | 702 | 8.10 |
| 140 | 3 | "Thirty Percent Sleight of Hand" | Eric Laneuville | Michael A. O’Shea | October 10, 2018 | 703 | 8.41 |
| 141 | 4 | "This Isn't Charity" | Batán Silva | Matt Whitney | October 17, 2018 | 704 | 7.88 |
| 142 | 5 | "A Volatile Mixture" | Sanford Bookstaver | Andrea Newman | October 24, 2018 | 705 | 7.70 |
| 143 | 6 | "All the Proof" | Leslie Libman | Jamila Daniel | October 31, 2018 | 706 | 7.97 |
| 144 | 7 | "What Will Define You" | Olivia Newman | Michael A. O'Shea | November 7, 2018 | 707 | 8.26 |
| 145 | 8 | "The Solution to Everything" | Mark Tinker | Michael Gilvary | November 14, 2018 | 708 | 7.29 |
| 146 | 9 | "Always a Catch" | Reza Tabrizi | Derek Haas | December 5, 2018 | 709 | 7.94 |
| 147 | 10 | "Inside These Walls" | Jono Oliver | Matt Whitney | January 9, 2019 | 710 | 8.01 |
| 148 | 11 | "You Choose" | Paul McCrane | Jamila Daniel | January 16, 2019 | 711 | 8.03 |
| 149 | 12 | "Make This Right" | Milena Govich | Andrea Newman | January 23, 2019 | 712 | 8.43 |
| 150 | 13 | "The Plunge" | Leslie Libman | Michael A. O'Shea | February 6, 2019 | 713 | 8.79 |
| 151 | 14 | "It Wasn't About Hockey" | Carl Seaton | Elizabeth Sherman & Derek Haas | February 13, 2019 | 714 | 8.43 |
| 152 | 15 | "What I Saw" | Reza Tabrizi | Andrea Newman & Michael Gilvary | February 20, 2019 | 715 | 8.85 |
| 153 | 16 | "Fault in Him" | Eric Laneuville | Matt Whitney | February 27, 2019 | 716 | 8.27 |
| 154 | 17 | "Move a Wall" | Olivia Newman | Derek Haas | March 27, 2019 | 717 | 8.26 |
| 155 | 18 | "No Such Thing as Bad Luck" | Jann Turner | Michael Gilvary | April 3, 2019 | 718 | 8.24 |
| 156 | 19 | "Until the Weather Breaks" | Reza Tabrizi | Michael O'Shea | April 24, 2019 | 719 | 8.11 |
| 157 | 20 | "Try Like Hell" | Stephen Cragg | Matt Whitney & Jamila Daniel | May 8, 2019 | 720 | 7.74 |
| 158 | 21 | "The White Whale" | Joe Chappelle | Andrea Newman & Michael Gilvary | May 15, 2019 | 721 | 7.96 |
| 159 | 22 | "I'm Not Leaving You" | Reza Tabrizi | Derek Haas | May 22, 2019 | 722 | 7.51 |

=== Season 8 (2019–20) ===
| No. overall | No. in season | Title | Directed by | Written by | Original release date | Prod. code | U.S. viewers (millions) |
|---|---|---|---|---|---|---|---|
| 160 | 1 | "Sacred Ground" | Reza Tabrizi | Derek Haas | September 25, 2019 | 801 | 7.32 |
| 161 | 2 | "A Real Shot in the Arm" | Sanford Bookstaver | Andrea Newman & Michael Gilvary | October 2, 2019 | 802 | 7.64 |
| 162 | 3 | "Badlands" | Olivia Newman | Michael A. O'Shea | October 9, 2019 | 803 | 7.70 |
| 163 | 4 | "Infection: Part I" | Reza Tabrizi | Teleplay by : Derek Haas; Story by : Dick Wolf & Derek Haas | October 16, 2019 | 804 | 8.23 |
| 164 | 5 | "Buckle Up" | Leslie Libman | Matt Whitney | October 23, 2019 | 805 | 7.87 |
| 165 | 6 | "What Went Wrong" | Sanford Bookstaver | Jamila Daniel | October 30, 2019 | 806 | 7.45 |
| 166 | 7 | "Welcome to Crazytown" | Carl Seaton | Andrea Newman & Michael Gilvary | November 6, 2019 | 807 | 7.68 |
| 167 | 8 | "Seeing Is Believing" | Eric Laneuville | Ron McCants | November 13, 2019 | 808 | 7.17 |
| 168 | 9 | "Best Friend Magic" | Reza Tabrizi | Derek Haas | November 20, 2019 | 809 | 8.36 |
| 169 | 10 | "Hold Our Ground" | Matt Earl Beesley | Michael A. O'Shea | January 8, 2020 | 810 | 7.95 |
| 170 | 11 | "Where We End Up" | Batán Silva | Matt Whitney | January 15, 2020 | 811 | 8.17 |
| 171 | 12 | "Then Nick Porter Happened" | Reza Tabrizi | Andrea Newman & Michael Gilvary | January 22, 2020 | 812 | 8.18 |
| 172 | 13 | "A Chicago Welcome" | Paul McCrane | Derek Haas | February 5, 2020 | 813 | 8.18 |
| 173 | 14 | "Shut It Down" | Leslie Libman | Neil McCormack | February 12, 2020 | 814 | 8.28 |
| 174 | 15 | "Off the Grid" | Reza Tabrizi | Matt Whitney | February 26, 2020 | 815 | 8.66 |
| 175 | 16 | "The Tendency of a Drowning Victim" | Matt Earl Beesley | Andrea Newman & Michael Gilvary | March 4, 2020 | 816 | 8.26 |
| 176 | 17 | "Protect a Child" | Brenna Malloy | Derek Haas | March 18, 2020 | 817 | 9.02 |
| 177 | 18 | "I'll Cover You" | Eric Laneuville | Teleplay by : Michael Gilvary & Andrea Newman; Story by : Ron McCants & Michael A. O'Shea | March 25, 2020 | 818 | 9.20 |
| 178 | 19 | "Light Things Up" | Nicole Rubio | Elizabeth Sherman | April 8, 2020 | 819 | 8.99 |
| 179 | 20 | "51's Original Bell" | Eric Laneuville | Matt Whitney | April 15, 2020 | 820 | 9.46 |

=== Season 9 (2020–21) ===
| No. overall | No. in season | Title | Directed by | Written by | Original release date | Prod. code | U.S. viewers (millions) |
|---|---|---|---|---|---|---|---|
| 180 | 1 | "Rattle Second City" | Reza Tabrizi | Derek Haas | November 11, 2020 | 901 | 7.23 |
| 181 | 2 | "That Kind of Heat" | Reza Tabrizi | Andrea Newman & Michael Gilvary | November 18, 2020 | 902 | 7.77 |
| 182 | 3 | "Smash Therapy" | Eric Laneuville | Matt Whitney | January 13, 2021 (Note: This episode was originally scheduled to air on January 6, 2021, in the United States and Canada. In the United States it was replaced by a rerun of season 8 episode "Best Friend Magic" in the Pacific and Mountain time zone as a result of the January 6 United States Capitol attack, however the episode still partially aired on its originally scheduled air date for Canada's east coast on CityTV before being switched for a re-run of episode 2.) | 903 | 7.26 |
| 183 | 4 | "Funny What Things Remind Us" | Matt Earl Beesley | Elizabeth Sherman | January 27, 2021 (Note: This episode was originally scheduled to air on January 13, 2021 in the United States and Canada, but was replaced in the United States by "Smash Therapy", which was postponed from the previous Wednesday.) | 904 | 6.95 |
| 184 | 5 | "My Lucky Day" | Reza Tabrizi | Michael Gilvary & Andrea Newman & Derek Haas | February 3, 2021 (Note: This episode was originally scheduled to air on January 20, 2021, in the United States and Canada, but was preempted in the United States for news coverage of the Inauguration of Joe Biden.) | 905 | 7.31 |
| 185 | 6 | "Blow This Up Somehow" | Matt Earl Beesley | Andrea Newman & Michael Gilvary | February 10, 2021 | 906 | 7.50 |
| 186 | 7 | "Dead of Winter" | Brenna Malloy | Kimberly Ndombe | February 17, 2021 | 907 | 7.29 |
| 187 | 8 | "Escape Route" | Matt Earl Beesley | Neil McCormack | March 10, 2021 | 908 | 7.04 |
| 188 | 9 | "Double Red" | Reza Tabrizi | Derek Haas | March 17, 2021 | 909 | 7.48 |
| 189 | 10 | "One Crazy Shift" | Milena Govich | Ashley Cooper | March 31, 2021 | 910 | 7.35 |
| 190 | 11 | "A Couple Hundred Degrees" | Brenna Malloy | Andrea Newman & Michael Gilvary | April 7, 2021 | 911 | 6.65 |
| 191 | 12 | "Natural Born Firefighter" | Eric Laneuville | Matt Whitney | April 21, 2021 | 912 | 6.92 |
| 192 | 13 | "Don't Hang Up" | Reza Tabrizi | Derek Haas | May 5, 2021 (Note: This episode was originally scheduled to air on April 28, 2021, in the United States and Canada, but was preempted in the United States due to President Joe Biden's presidential address to the joint session of Congress.) | 913 | 7.22 |
| 193 | 14 | "What Comes Next" | Eric Laneuville | Elizabeth Sherman | May 12, 2021 | 914 | 7.08 |
| 194 | 15 | "A White-Knuckle Panic" | Reza Tabrizi | Andrea Newman & Michael Gilvary | May 19, 2021 | 915 | 6.84 |
| 195 | 16 | "No Survivors" | Lisa Robinson | Derek Haas | May 26, 2021 | 916 | 7.26 |

=== Season 10 (2021–22) ===
| No. overall | No. in season | Title | Directed by | Written by | Original release date | Prod. code | U.S. viewers (millions) |
|---|---|---|---|---|---|---|---|
| 196 | 1 | "Mayday" | Reza Tabrizi | Andrea Newman & Michael Gilvary | September 22, 2021 | 1001 | 7.28 |
| 197 | 2 | "Head Count" | Matt Earl Beesley | Matt Whitney | September 29, 2021 | 1002 | 7.36 |
| 198 | 3 | "Counting Your Breaths" | Heather Cappiello | Elizabeth Sherman | October 6, 2021 | 1003 | 7.18 |
| 199 | 4 | "The Right Thing" | Stephen Cragg | Andrea Newman & Michael Gilvary | October 13, 2021 | 1004 | 7.25 |
| 200 | 5 | "Two Hundred" | Reza Tabrizi | Derek Haas | October 20, 2021 | 1005 | 7.36 |
| 201 | 6 | "Dead Zone" | Matt Earl Beesley | Ashley Cooper | October 27, 2021 | 1006 | 6.80 |
| 202 | 7 | "Whom Shall I Fear?" | Reza Tabrizi | Victor Teran | November 3, 2021 | 1007 | 7.00 |
| 203 | 8 | "What Happened at Whiskey Point?" | Stephen Cragg | Andrea Newman & Michael Gilvary | November 10, 2021 | 1008 | 6.63 |
| 204 | 9 | "Winterfest" | Reza Tabrizi | Derek Haas | December 8, 2021 | 1009 | 6.77 |
| 205 | 10 | "Back with a Bang" | Matt Earl Beesley | Andrea Newman & Michael Gilvary | January 5, 2022 | 1010 | 7.15 |
| 206 | 11 | "Fog of War" | Lisa Robinson | Matt Whitney | January 12, 2022 | 1011 | 7.41 |
| 207 | 12 | "Show of Force" | Lisa Demaine | Teleplay by : Andrea Newman & Michael Gilvary; Story by : Elizabeth Sherman | January 19, 2022 | 1012 | 7.27 |
| 208 | 13 | "Fire Cop" | Kantú Lentz | Andrea Newman & Michael Gilvary | February 23, 2022 | 1013 | 6.83 |
| 209 | 14 | "An Officer with Grit" | Stephen Cragg | Matt Demblowski | March 2, 2022 | 1014 | 6.89 |
| 210 | 15 | "The Missing Piece" | Daniel Willis | Andrea Newman & Michael Gilvary | March 9, 2022 | 1015 | 7.14 |
| 211 | 16 | "Hot and Fast" | Lisa Demaine | Elizabeth Sherman | March 16, 2022 | 1016 | 6.66 |
| 212 | 17 | "Keep You Safe" | Reza Tabrizi | Ashley Cooper | April 6, 2022 | 1017 | 7.39 |
| 213 | 18 | "What's Inside You" | Brenna Malloy | Derek Haas | April 13, 2022 | 1018 | 7.20 |
| 214 | 19 | "Finish What You Started" | Carlos Bernard | Matt Whitney | April 20, 2022 | 1019 | 7.21 |
| 215 | 20 | "Halfway to the Moon" | Lisa Robinson | Andrea Newman & Michael Gilvary | May 11, 2022 | 1020 | 6.78 |
| 216 | 21 | "Last Chance" | Brenna Malloy | Victor Teran | May 18, 2022 | 1021 | 6.79 |
| 217 | 22 | "The Magnificent City of Chicago" | Reza Tabrizi | Andrea Newman & Michael Gilvary | May 25, 2022 | 1022 | 7.03 |

=== Season 11 (2022–23) ===
| No. overall | No. in season | Title | Directed by | Written by | Original release date | Prod. code | U.S. viewers (millions) |
|---|---|---|---|---|---|---|---|
| 218 | 1 | "Hold on Tight" | Reza Tabrizi | Andrea Newman & Michael Gilvary | September 21, 2022 | 1101 | 6.75 |
| 219 | 2 | "Every Scar Tells a Story" | Brenna Malloy | Matt Whitney | September 28, 2022 | 1102 | 6.76 |
| 220 | 3 | "Completely Shattered" | Matt Earl Beesley | Derek Haas | October 5, 2022 | 1103 | 7.35 |
| 221 | 4 | "The Center of the Universe" | Stephen Cragg | Andrea Newman & Michael Gilvary | October 12, 2022 | 1104 | 7.16 |
| 222 | 5 | "Haunted House" | Reza Tabrizi | Victor Teran | October 19, 2022 | 1105 | 7.03 |
| 223 | 6 | "All-Out Mystery" | Brenna Malloy | Andrea Newman & Michael Gilvary | November 2, 2022 | 1106 | 6.56 |
| 224 | 7 | "Angry Is Easier" | Kantu Lentz | Elizabeth Sherman | November 9, 2022 | 1107 | 6.19 |
| 225 | 8 | "A Beautiful Life" | Lisa Robinson | Teleplay by : Andrea Newman & Michael Gilvary; Story by : Ashley Cooper | November 16, 2022 | 1108 | 6.90 |
| 226 | 9 | "Nemesis" | Reza Tabrizi | Victor Teran | December 7, 2022 | 1109 | 6.85 |
| 227 | 10 | "Something For the Pain" | Matt Earl Beesley | Matt Whitney | January 4, 2023 | 1110 | 7.06 |
| 228 | 11 | "A Guy I Used to Know" | Oscar Rene Lozoya II | Michael Gilvary | January 11, 2023 | 1111 | 6.84 |
| 229 | 12 | "How Does It End?" | Heather Cappiello | Matt Demblowski | January 18, 2023 | 1112 | 7.19 |
| 230 | 13 | "The Man of the Moment" | Matt Earl Beesley | Andrea Newman | February 15, 2023 | 1113 | 6.73 |
| 231 | 14 | "Run Like Hell" | William Eichler | Elizabeth Sherman | February 22, 2023 | 1114 | 6.99 |
| 232 | 15 | "Damage Control" | Lisa Demaine | Victor Teran | March 1, 2023 | 1115 | 6.72 |
| 233 | 16 | "Acting Up" | Reza Tabrizi | Andrea Newman & Michael Gilvary | March 22, 2023 | 1116 | 6.78 |
| 234 | 17 | "The First Symptom" | Paul McCrane | Matt Whitney | March 29, 2023 | 1117 | 6.84 |
| 235 | 18 | "Danger Is All Around" | Tayo Amos | Elizabeth Sherman | April 5, 2023 | 1118 | 6.77 |
| 236 | 19 | "Take a Shot at the King" | Stephen Cragg | Ashley Cooper | May 3, 2023 | 1119 | 6.11 |
| 237 | 20 | "Never, Ever Make a Mistake" | Lisa Demaine | Andrea Newman | May 10, 2023 | 1120 | 5.95 |
| 238 | 21 | "Change of Plans" | Lisa Robinson | Victor Teran | May 17, 2023 | 1121 | 6.02 |
| 239 | 22 | "Red Waterfall" | Reza Tabrizi | Andrea Newman & Michael Gilvary | May 24, 2023 | 1122 | 6.09 |

=== Season 12 (2024) ===
| No. overall | No. in season | Title | Directed by | Written by | Original release date | Prod. code | U.S. viewers (millions) |
|---|---|---|---|---|---|---|---|
| 240 | 1 | "Barely Gone" | Reza Tabrizi | Andrea Newman | January 17, 2024 | 1201 | 7.00 |
| 241 | 2 | "Call Me McHolland" | Lisa Demaine | Matt Whitney | January 24, 2024 | 1202 | 6.58 |
| 242 | 3 | "Trapped" | Reza Tabrizi | Michael Gilvary | January 31, 2024 | 1203 | 6.73 |
| 243 | 4 | "The Little Things" | Lisa Robinson | Victor Teran | February 7, 2024 | 1204 | 6.30 |
| 244 | 5 | "On the Hook" | Matt Earl Beesley | Matt Demblowski | February 21, 2024 | 1205 | 6.40 |
| 245 | 6 | "Port in the Storm" | Reza Tabrizi | Andrea Newman | February 28, 2024 | 1206 | 6.58 |
| 246 | 7 | "Red Flag" | William Eichler | Matt Whitney | March 20, 2024 | 1207 | 6.33 |
| 247 | 8 | "All the Dark" | Paul McCrane | Natalie Wood | March 27, 2024 | 1208 | 6.26 |
| 248 | 9 | "Something About Her" | Heather Cappiello | Victor Teran | April 3, 2024 | 1209 | 6.07 |
| 249 | 10 | "The Wrong Guy" | Reza Tabrizi | Danielle Nicki | May 1, 2024 | 1210 | 6.05 |
| 250 | 11 | "Inside Man" | Brenna Malloy | Matt Whitney | May 8, 2024 | 1211 | 6.08 |
| 251 | 12 | "Under Pressure" | Lisa Demaine | Jessica D. Johnson | May 15, 2024 | 1212 | 5.86 |
| 252 | 13 | "Never Say Goodbye" | Reza Tabrizi | Andrea Newman | May 22, 2024 | 1213 | 5.79 |

=== Season 13 (2024–25) ===
| No. overall | No. in season | Title | Directed by | Written by | Original release date | Prod. code | U.S. viewers (millions) |
|---|---|---|---|---|---|---|---|
| 253 | 1 | "A Monster in the Field" | Reza Tabrizi | Andrea Newman | September 25, 2024 | 1301 | 5.60 |
| 254 | 2 | "Ride the Blade" | Paul McCrane | Matt Whitney | October 2, 2024 | 1302 | 5.65 |
| 255 | 3 | "All Kinds of Crazy" | Reza Tabrizi | Nancy Kiu | October 9, 2024 | 1303 | 5.43 |
| 256 | 4 | "Through the Skin" | Brenna Mallory | Victor Teran | October 16, 2024 | 1304 | 5.64 |
| 257 | 5 | "Down the Rabbit Hole" | Lisa Demaine | Alec Wells | October 23, 2024 | 1305 | 5.90 |
| 258 | 6 | "Birds of Prey" | Matt Earl Beesley | Danielle Nicki | November 6, 2024 | 1306 | 5.77 |
| 259 | 7 | "Untouchable" | Lisa Robinson | Matt Whitney | November 13, 2024 | 1307 | 5.72 |
| 260 | 8 | "Quicksand" | Heather Cappiello | Andrea Newman | November 20, 2024 | 1308 | 5.72 |
| 261 | 9 | "A Favor" | Reza Tabrizi | Nancy Kiu | January 8, 2025 | 1309 | 5.77 |
| 262 | 10 | "Chaos Theory" | William Eichler | Alec Wells | January 22, 2025 | 1310 | 5.64 |
| 263 | 11 | "In the Trenches: Part I" | Reza Tabrizi | Victor Teran | January 29, 2025 | 1311 | 6.31 |
| 264 | 12 | "Relief Cut" | Paul McCrane | Matt Whitney | February 5, 2025 | 1312 | 5.92 |
| 265 | 13 | "Born of Fire" | Lisa Robinson | Danielle Nicki | February 19, 2025 | 1313 | 5.89 |
| 266 | 14 | "Bar Time" | Sheelin Choksey | Nancy Kiu | February 26, 2025 | 1314 | 5.61 |
| 267 | 15 | "Too Close" | Pete Chatmon | Andrea Newman | March 5, 2025 | 1315 | 5.66 |
| 268 | 16 | "In the Rubble" | Matt Earl Beesley | Victor Teran | March 26, 2025 | 1316 | 5.73 |
| 269 | 17 | "A Beast Like This" | Chris DeAngelis | Julia Keimach | April 2, 2025 | 1317 | 5.86 |
| 270 | 18 | "Post-Mortem" | Reza Tabrizi | Alec Wells | April 16, 2025 | 1318 | 5.58 |
| 271 | 19 | "Permanent Damage" | William Eichler | Matt Whitney | April 23, 2025 | 1319 | 5.28 |
| 272 | 20 | "Cut Me Open" | Lisa Robinson | Danielle Nicki Motley & Meridith Friedman | May 7, 2025 | 1320 | 5.41 |
| 273 | 21 | "The Bad Guy" | Lisa Demaine | Victor Teran | May 14, 2025 | 1321 | 5.40 |
| 274 | 22 | "It Had to End This Way" | Reza Tabrizi | Andrea Newman & Alec Wells | May 21, 2025 | 1322 | 5.61 |

=== Season 14 (2025–26) ===
| No. overall | No. in season | Title | Directed by | Written by | Original airdate | Prod. code | U.S. viewers (millions) |
|---|---|---|---|---|---|---|---|
| 275 | 1 | "Kicking Down Doors" | Reza Tabrizi | Andrea Newman & Alec Wells | October 1, 2025 | 1401 | 5.34 |
| 276 | 2 | "Primary Search" | Matt Earl Beesley | Matt Whitney | October 8, 2025 | 1402 | 4.79 |
| 277 | 3 | "In the Blood" | Lisa Robinson | Victor Teran | October 15, 2025 | 1403 | 5.14 |
| 278 | 4 | "Mercy" | Reza Tabrizi | Alec Wells | October 22, 2025 | 1404 | 5.24 |
| 279 | 5 | "Ghosts" | Lisa Demaine | Davon Briggs | October 29, 2025 | 1405 | 4.95 |
| 280 | 6 | "Broken Things" | Avi Youabian | Matt Whitney & Julia Keimach | November 5, 2025 | 1406 | 5.01 |
| 281 | 7 | "Pierce the Vein" | William Eichler | Victor Teran | November 12, 2025 | 1407 | 5.11 |
| 282 | 8 | "A Man Possessed" | Reza Tabrizi | Alec Wells | January 7, 2026 | 1408 | N/A |
| 283 | 9 | "Crime of Passion" | Steve Robin | Teleplay by : Alec Wells; Story by : Matt Whitney | January 14, 2026 | 1409 | N/A |
| 284 | 10 | "Carry a Torch" | Sheelin Choksey | Andrea Newman & Davon Briggs | January 21, 2026 | 1410 | N/A |
| 285 | 11 | "Frostbite Blue" | Chris DeAngelis | Hussain Pirani | January 28, 2026 | 1411 | N/A |
| 286 | 12 | "Coming in Hot" | Lisa Demaine | Victor Teran | February 4, 2026 | 1412 | N/A |
| 287 | 13 | "Reckoning, Part I" | Reza Tabrizi | Victor Teran | March 4, 2026 | 1415 | N/A |
| 288 | 14 | "Hit and Run" | Anthony Nardolillo | Alec Wells | March 11, 2026 | 1413 | N/A |
| 289 | 15 | "Do Not Resuscitate" | Sheelin Choksey | Matt Whitney | March 18, 2026 | 1414 | N/A |
| 290 | 16 | "Firehouse 66" | Paul McCrane | Hussain Pirani | April 1, 2026 | 1416 | N/A |
| 291 | 17 | "Sway" | Matt Earl Beesley | Natalie Bartlett | April 8, 2026 | 1417 | N/A |
| 292 | 18 | "Instinct" | Reza Tabrizi | Alec Wells | April 22, 2026 | 1418 | N/A |
| 293 | 19 | "Exit Point" | William Eichler | Matt Whitney | April 29, 2026 | 1419 | N/A |
| 294 | 20 | "Speak of the Devil" | Steve Robin | Victor Teran | May 6, 2026 | 1420 | N/A |
| 295 | 21 | "Thank You" | Reza Tabrizi | Andrea Newman | May 13, 2026 | 1421 | N/A |

=== Season 15 (2026) ===
| No. overall | No. in season | Title | Directed by | Written by | Original airdate | Prod. code | U.S. viewers (millions) |
|---|---|---|---|---|---|---|---|
| 296 | 1 | "New Blood" | Reza Tabrizi | Victor Teran | October 7, 2026 | 1501 | 5.13 |
| 297 | 2 | "Rattle the Cage" | Lisa Demaine | Desta Tedros Reff | October 14, 2026 | 1502 | 5.24 |
| 298 | 3 | "Take the Hit" | Paul McCrane | Hussain Pirani | October 21, 2026 | 1503 | 4.72 |
| 299 | 4 | "A Perfect Arson" | Steve Robin | Alec Wells | October 28, 2026 | 1504 | 4.63 |
| 300 | 5 | "Three Hundred" | Reza Tabrizi | Matt Whitney | November 4, 2026 | 1505 | 5.36 |
| 301 | 6 | "Over the Edge" | Lisa Robinson | Christina Nieves | November 11, 2026 | 1506 | 5.34 |
| 302 | 7 | "No Love Lost" | TBA | Amelia Swedeen | November 18, 2026 | TBA | TBD |

== Ratings ==
=== Season 13 ===
Viewership and ratings per episode of List of Chicago Fire episodes
| No. | Title | Air date | Rating (18–49) | Viewers (millions) | DVR (18–49) | DVR viewers (millions) | Total (18–49) | Total viewers (millions) | Ref. |
|---|---|---|---|---|---|---|---|---|---|
| 1 | "A Monster in the Field" | September 25, 2024 | 0.4 | 5.60 | —N/a | —N/a | —N/a | —N/a | |
| 2 | "Ride the Blade" | October 2, 2024 | 0.4 | 5.65 | —N/a | —N/a | —N/a | —N/a | |
| 3 | "All Kinds of Crazy" | October 9, 2024 | 0.4 | 5.43 | —N/a | —N/a | —N/a | —N/a | |
| 4 | "Through the Skin" | October 16, 2024 | 0.4 | 5.64 | 0.2 | 2.03 | 0.6 | 7.67 | |
| 5 | "Down the Rabbit Hole" | October 23, 2024 | 0.4 | 5.90 | 0.2 | 2.06 | 0.6 | 7.96 | |
| 6 | "Birds of Prey" | November 6, 2024 | 0.5 | 5.77 | 0.3 | 2.28 | 0.7 | 8.05 | |
| 7 | "Untouchable" | November 13, 2024 | 0.4 | 5.72 | 0.3 | 2.24 | 0.7 | 7.96 | |
| 8 | "Quicksand" | November 20, 2024 | 0.4 | 5.72 | 0.2 | 2.06 | 0.6 | 7.78 | |
| 9 | "A Favor" | January 8, 2025 | 0.4 | 5.77 | 0.2 | 1.82 | 0.6 | 7.58 | |
| 10 | "Chaos Theory" | January 22, 2025 | 0.4 | 5.64 | 0.2 | 2.22 | 0.6 | 7.87 | |
| 11 | "In the Trenches: Part I" | January 29, 2025 | 0.5 | 6.31 | 0.2 | 1.97 | 0.7 | 8.30 | |
| 12 | "Relief Cut" | February 5, 2025 | 0.4 | 5.92 | 0.2 | 2.18 | 0.7 | 8.10 | |
| 13 | "Born of Fire" | February 19, 2025 | 0.4 | 5.89 | 0.3 | 2.26 | 0.7 | 8.15 | |
| 14 | "Bar Time" | February 26, 2025 | 0.4 | 5.61 | 0.3 | 2.24 | 0.7 | 7.85 | |
| 15 | "Too Close" | March 5, 2025 | 0.3 | 5.66 | 0.2 | 2.06 | 0.6 | 7.74 | |
| 16 | "In the Rubble" | March 26, 2025 | 0.3 | 5.73 | 0.2 | 2.27 | 0.6 | 7.99 | |
| 17 | "A Beast Like This" | April 2, 2025 | 0.4 | 5.86 | —N/a | —N/a | —N/a | —N/a | |
| 18 | "Post-Mortem" | April 16, 2025 | 0.3 | 5.58 | —N/a | —N/a | —N/a | —N/a | |
| 19 | "Permanent Damage" | April 23, 2025 | 0.3 | 5.28 | —N/a | —N/a | —N/a | —N/a | |
| 20 | "Cut Me Open" | May 7, 2025 | 0.3 | 5.41 | —N/a | —N/a | —N/a | —N/a | |
| 21 | "The Bad Guy" | May 14, 2025 | 0.4 | 5.40 | —N/a | —N/a | —N/a | —N/a | |
| 22 | "It Had to End This Way" | May 21, 2025 | 0.4 | 5.61 | —N/a | —N/a | —N/a | —N/a | |

=== Season 14 ===
Viewership and ratings per episode of List of Chicago Fire episodes
| No. | Title | Air date | Rating (18–49) | Viewers (millions) | DVR (18–49) | DVR viewers (millions) | Total (18–49) | Total viewers (millions) | Ref. |
|---|---|---|---|---|---|---|---|---|---|
| 1 | "Kicking Down Doors" | October 1, 2025 | 0.4 | 5.34 | 0.2 | 1.99 | 0.6 | 7.33 | |
| 2 | "Primary Search" | October 8, 2025 | 0.3 | 4.79 | 0.1 | 1.91 | 0.4 | 6.70 | |
| 3 | "In the Blood" | October 15, 2025 | 0.4 | 5.14 | 0.2 | 2.02 | 0.6 | 7.16 | |
| 4 | "Mercy" | October 22, 2025 | 0.4 | 5.24 | 0.5 | 1.89 | 0.5 | 7.14 | |
| 5 | "Ghosts" | October 29, 2025 | 0.3 | 4.95 | 0.2 | 1.94 | 0.5 | 6.90 | |
| 6 | "Broken Things" | November 5, 2025 | 0.4 | 5.01 | 0.1 | 1.86 | 0.5 | 6.89 | |
| 7 | "Pierce the Vein" | November 12, 2025 | 0.3 | 5.11 | —N/a | —N/a | —N/a | —N/a | |

== Home media ==
| Season | Episodes | DVD release dates | | | | Bonus features |
| Season | Episodes | Region 1 | Region 2 | Region 4 | Discs | Bonus features |
|---|---|---|---|---|---|---|
| 1 | 24 | September 10, 2013 | October 14, 2013 | May 1, 2014 | 5 | Behind the Scenes; Otis' Podcasts |
| 2 | 22 | September 2, 2014 | November 10, 2014 | December 4, 2014 | 5 | Behind the Scenes; I Am a Firefighter Digital Series; "Stepping Stone"—Chicago P.D. Pilot Episode; "8:30 PM"—The conclusion of a two-part crossover event that begins on "A Dark Day" |
| 3 | 23 | September 1, 2015 | November 23, 2015 | February 18, 2016 | 6 | Behind the Scenes; Chicago P.D. Season 2 Crossover Episodes "They'll Have to Go Through Me", (Note: "Chicago Crossover" and "They'll Have to Go Through Me" are parts two and three of the crossover event that begins on "Nobody Touches Anything".) "A Little Devil Complex" (Note: "A Little Devil Complex" is the conclusion of the crossover event that begins on "Three Bells".) and "The Number of Rats" (Note: "The Number of Rats" and "Daydream Believer" are parts two and three of the crossover event that begins on "We Called Her Jellybean".); Law & Order: SVU Season 16 Crossover Episodes "Chicago Crossover" and "Daydream Believer" |
| 4 | 23 | August 30, 2016 | November 7, 2016 | March 22, 2017 | 6 | Behind the Scenes; Chicago Med Season 1 Crossover Episode "Malignant" (Note: "Malignant" and "Now I'm God" are parts two and three of the crossover event that begins on "The Beating Heart".); Chicago P.D. Season 3 Crossover Episode "Now I'm God" |
| 1-4 | 92 | N/A | N/A | March 22, 2017 | 22 | Same as individual releases. |
| 5 | 22 | August 29, 2017 | December 4, 2017 | February 7, 2018 | 6 | Behind the Scenes; Chicago P.D. Season 4 Crossover Episodes "Don't Bury This Case" (Note: "Don't Bury This Case" is the conclusion of the crossover event that begins on "Some Make It, Some Don't".) and "Emotional Proximity" (Note: "Emotional Proximity" and "Fake" are parts two and three of the crossover event that begins on "Deathtrap".); Chicago Justice Season 1 Crossover Episode "Fake" |
| 1-5 | 114 | N/A | N/A | February 7, 2018 | 28 | Same as individual releases. |
| 6 | 23 | August 28, 2018 | October 22, 2018 | September 19, 2018 | 6 | Chicago P.D. Season 5 Crossover Episode "Profiles" (Note: "Profiles" is part one of the crossover event that concludes on "Hiding Not Seeking".) |
| 1-6 | 137 | N/A | October 22, 2018 | N/A | 34 | Released both DVD and Blu-Ray. |
| 7 | 22 | August 27, 2019 | September 23, 2019 | 18 September 2019 | 6 | Chicago Med Season 4 Crossover Episode "When to Let Go" (Note: "When to Let Go" and "Endings" are parts two and three of the crossover event that begins on "Going to War".); Chicago P.D. Season 6 Crossover Episodes "Endings" and "Good Men" (Note: "Good Men" is part two of the crossover event that begins on "What I Saw".) |
| 1-7 | 159 | N/A | September 23, 2019 | N/A | 40 | Same as individual releases. |

== See also ==
- Chicago (franchise)
- List of Chicago P.D. episodes
- List of Chicago Med episodes
- List of Chicago Justice episodes
