= Deanna Dunagan =

American actress

- Born: Monahans, Texas, United States
- Occupation: Actress
- Years active: 1970–present

Deanna Dunagan is an American actress. While principally active as a stage actress, she has also worked in television and film. She is best known for her Tony Award-winning portrayal of Violet Weston in Tracy Letts' August: Osage County and for her portrayal of Nana in M. Night Shyamalan's 2015 film The Visit. She has also appeared in the recurring roles of Mother Bernadette on the Fox television series The Exorcist and Mrs. Charles on Chicago Med. She portrayed Dr. Willa Sipe in the 2018 film An Acceptable Loss by writer Joe Chappelle; and starred as Sharon in the 2021 film Stillwater alongside Matt Damon and Abigail Breslin.

== Early life and education ==
Dunagan was born and raised in Monahans, Texas, United States, the daughter of Kathlyn (Cosper) and John Conrad Dunagan. The eldest of five children, her father was a Coca-Cola bottler and president of the Texas Historical Association; her mother was a stay-at-home parent with an active presence in the community. In an interview, Dunagan light-heartedly described her extended family, "My heritage is a long line of Southern Baptist and Methodist preachers. And aren't they all just frustrated actors?"

Dunagan earned a degree in music education from the University of Texas, Austin. She briefly dated Charles Whitman, the infamous "Texas Tower Sniper", while a college student. She married her high school sweetheart and gave birth to a son; but the marriage ended a few years later. Following her divorce, Dunagan's parents agreed to fund graduate studies at Trinity University, Texas through the Dallas Theater Center. While writing her Master's thesis, Dunagan lived in Mexico. She was engaged to a bullfighter, but they never married, and she went on to pursue her acting career in the United States.

== Career ==
Dunagan began her acting career touring in dinner theater and later performing in regional theaters such as the Asolo Repertory Theatre in Sarasota, Florida, and the Actors Theatre of Louisville before trying her luck in New York City. She made her Broadway debut in the 1979 production of George Bernard Shaw's Man and Superman at Circle in the Square as an understudy for Ann Sachs. Sachs became ill at one point during the show's run and Dunagan filled in for her with great success. This exposure led to her to being signed with International Creative Management.

In 1981, Dunagan performed in the first national tour of Children of a Lesser God. During the tour, Dunagan visited Chicago for the first time and immediately fell in love with the city. After the end of the tour, Dunagan moved to Chicago and has lived there ever since, performing in more than 30 theaters in the Chicago area. Her work on the Chicago stage has garnered her three Joseph Jefferson Awards and three After Dark Awards.

She has worked in films including The Visit, The Naked Face, Running Scared, Men Don't Leave, and Losing Isaiah. She has also appeared in made for television movies, in the TV mini-series A Will of Their Own and Amerika, and as a guest star on the television shows Prison Break, What About Joan, Missing Persons, and The Strain. She has had recurring roles in Unforgettable and The Exorcist.

In 2007-2008, Dunagan returned to Broadway in the Steppenwolf Theatre's production of Tracy Letts' August: Osage County, having originated the role in Chicago. For her performance, Dunagan won a Tony Award, Theatre World Award, Drama Desk Award, and an Outer Critics Circle Award. She went on to portray Violet Weston in productions in London's West End in 2009 and in Sydney, Australia in 2010.

She returned to New York in 2017 to Playwrights Horizons Off-Broadway to perform in the world premiere of The Treasurer by Max Posner.

== Filmography ==
=== Film ===
Year	Title	Role	Notes
1984	The Naked Face	Mrs. Hadley	
1986	Running Scared	Sister Rebecca	
1990	Men Don't Leave	Fay	
1995	Losing Isaiah	Dr. Goldstein	
2002	Janey Van Winkle	Mom Van Winkle	Short
2007	Dimension	Annabelle	
2011	Mariachi Gringo	Monica	
2013	The Cherokee Word for Water	Irene Mankiller	
2015	The Visit	Nana	Fright Meter Award for Best Supporting Actress; Nominated - Fangoria Chainsaw Award for Best Supporting Actress
2018	An Acceptable Loss	Dr. Willa Sipe	
2021	Stillwater	Sharon	
2022	So Cold the River	Anne	
2023	Asteroid City	Waitress	
2024	Ghostlight	Herself	

=== Television ===
Year	Title	Role	Notes
1982	American Playhouse	Emily Dickenson	Episode: "Any Friend of Nicholas Nickleby Is a Friend of Mine"
1984	American Playhouse	Various	3 episodes
1987	Amerika	Betty Milford	Episode: "Part VII"
1994	Two Fathers: Justice for the Innocent	Janice Bradley	Television movie
2000	What About Joan?	Sandy	Episode: "Quid Pro Quo"
2005	Prison Break	Judy Pope	2 episodes
2008	Law & Order	Estelle Adams	Episode: "Zero"
2009	The Big D	Donna Dupree	Television movie
2009	Psych	Myrtle	Episode: "Let's Get Hairy"
2009	Cold Case	Iris Keening	Episode: "WASP"
2010	Ugly Betty	Lee	Episode: "Back in Her Place"
2011	Detroit 1-8-7	Helen Lakeland	Episode: "Beaten/Cover Letter"
2011	Unforgettable	Alice	5 episodes
2011	Have a Little Faith	Sarah	Television film
2012	Private Practice	Dr. Vivian Carlsmith	Episode: "Apron Strings"
2014	House of Cards	Susan Marbury	Episode: "Chapter 18"
2016	The Strain	Ancharia	Episode: "First Born"
2016	The Exorcist	Mother Bernadette	4 episodes
2019	Proven Innocent	Deborah Vandenhey	Episode: "Shaken"
2019 - 2026	Chicago Med	Margaret Charles	Recurring role
2020	Dispatches from Elsewhere	Nana	2 episodes
2021	Tell Me Your Secrets	Esther Moses	3 episodes

== Theatre ==
Year	Title	Role	Notes
1979	Man and Superman	Understudy	Circle in the Square Theatre (Broadway)
1980	Sunset/Sunrise	Diane	Actors Theatre of Louisville (Louisville, KY)
1981	Children of a Lesser God	Performer	National Tour
1988	Stepping Out	Performer	Steppenwolf Theatre Company (Chicago, IL)
1991	Still Waters	Performer	Victory Gardens Theater (Chicago, IL)
1991	Coriolanus	Performer	Next Theatre Company (Chicago, IL)
1992	Private Passage	Performer	Odyssey Theatre (Chicago, IL)
1992	The Song of Jacob Zulu	Performer	Steppenwolf Theatre Company (Chicago, IL)
1992	Inspecting Carol	Performer	Steppenwolf Theatre Company (Chicago, IL)
1996	A Touch of the Poet	Deborah Harford	Goodman Theatre (Chicago, IL)
1996	The Washington-Sarajevo Talks	Rhonda	Victory Gardens Theatre (Chicago, IL)
1996	Slaughterhouse-Five	Performer	Steppenwolf Theatre Company (Chicago, IL)
2001	Cahoots	Gwendoline	Victory Gardens Theatre (Chicago, IL)
2001	The Glamour House	Trudi Stein	Victory Gardens Theatre (Chicago, IL)
2001	Butley	Edna Shaft	Writers Theatre (Chicago, IL)
2002	Cat on a Hot Tin Roof	Performer	Apple Tree Theatre (Chicago, IL)
2002	A Lie of the Mind	Performer	American Theatre Company (Chicago, IL)
2003	Wedding Band	Herman's Mother	Steppenwolf Theatre Company (Chicago, IL)
2003	James Joyce's The Dead	Aunt Julia Morkan	Court Theatre (Chicago, IL)
2003	Bounce	Ensemble	Goodman Theatre (Chicago, IL)
2004	A Delicate Balance	Performer	Remy Bumppo (Chicago, IL)
2006	I Never Sang for My Father	Margaret	Steppenwolf Theatre Company (Chicago, IL)
2006	The Best Man	Performer	Remy Bumppo (Chicago, IL)
2006	Ten Little Indians	Emily Brent	Drury Lane Oakbrook (Chicago, IL)
2007–2010	August: Osage County	Violet Weston	Broadway, Chicago, London, & Sydney
2012	A Little Night Music	Madame Armfeldt	Writers Theatre (Chicago)
2013	Other Desert Cities	Polly Wyeth	Goodman Theatre (Chicago)
2013	The North China Lover	M	Lookingglass Theatre Company
2015	Marvin's Room	Aunt Ruth	Shattered Globe Theater, Chicago
2017	The Treasurer	Ida Armstrong	Playwrights Horizons
2018	Blind Date	Nancy Reagan	Goodman Theatre (Chicago)
