= Antonio Dawson =

Fictional character in the Chicago PD series

- Antonio Dawson
- First appearance: CF: "Professional Courtesy" (episode 1.03); CPD: "Stepping Stone" (episode 1.01); CJ: "Fake" (episode 1.01)
- Last appearance: CPD: "Reckoning" (episode 6.22)
- Created by: Matt Olmstead
- Portrayed by: Jon Seda

In-universe information
- Gender: Male
- Occupation: Chief Investigator, Cook County ASA's Office (formerly); Detective, CPD; Boxing coach/trainer (off-duty)
- Family: Ramón Dawson (father); Camilla Dawson (mother); Gabriela Dawson (sister)
- Spouse: Laura (divorced)
- Significant other: Sylvie Brett (ex-girlfriend)
- Children: Diego Dawson (son); Eva Dawson (daughter)
- Relatives: Matthew Casey (former brother-in-law)
- Nationality: American

Police career
- Department: Chicago Police Department: Intelligence Unit; Vice Squad (CF: S1)
- Years of service: 2000s – 2019
- Rank: Senior Detective
- Badge No.: 50259

Antonio Dawson, portrayed by Jon Seda, is a fictional character in the Chicago franchise and is a main character in Chicago P.D. and Chicago Justice. He was introduced as a recurring character on Chicago Fire before the spin-off Chicago P.D. was created. He is the former second-in-command of the Intelligence Unit of the Chicago Police Department (CPD) and regularly appears on Chicago Fire. He is also the older brother of Gabriela "Gabby" Dawson, formerly a paramedic-turned-firefighter at Firehouse 51.

The character is first introduced in Chicago Fire as one of several recurring characters from the CPD who cross paths with the firefighters. In October 2016, Seda confirmed that the character would move to the third spin-off Chicago Justice, debuting in March 2017, after resigning from his position in the CPD to take up a job with the State's Attorney's Office. After the cancellation of Chicago Justice, the character is written to have returned to the CPD due to his frustration with the bureaucratic red tape he often encounters.

Antonio Dawson has two kids. However, subsequent events in Season 1 and Dawson's dedication to his job take a toll on his and his wife's marriage, resulting in his wife leaving with their two children. They eventually divorce under acrimonious terms, and she prevents the children from seeing their father for some time. Eva took it particularly hard and even resorted to running away to see her father. The custody issue was never fully explained on the show; the children live with their mother, and Dawson keeps in touch with them by phone.

Dawson was raised Catholic and once quipped to Olinsky about being "in a confessional every other day" as a boy. A boxing enthusiast (like actor Jon Seda), he had a difficult adolescence, and boxing was his outlet, as shown by the fact that he runs his own gym and moonlights as a trainer when off duty. He is the older brother of Chicago Fire character Gabriela "Gabby" Dawson. The siblings come from a large extended family and share a close relationship.

The character is frequently seen on Chicago Fire and was first introduced in the episode "Professional Courtesy" after Gabby and her colleagues from Firehouse 51 rescue a boy and his father in a car accident caused by a drunk Justin Voight, Hank's son. He is generally well-liked by the firefighters at 51.

Before transferring to Intelligence, Dawson worked on the Vice Squad. He was partnered with Detective Julie "Jules" Willhite, with whom he shared a close friendship until she was killed by drug lord Andres "Pulpo" Diaz in "Stepping Stone."

It has been mentioned by Gabriela Dawson that Antonio Dawson is in the crisis response team in the Bahamas in "Best Friend Magic".

== In Chicago Fire ==
Antonio is a cop who takes pride in his job. He has been involved in numerous sting and undercover operations, some of which include drug busts, high-profile arrests, and more personal cases. Antonio has a close relationship with his sister, Gabriela Dawson, a paramedic for CFD. When Antonio is shot in a drive-by shooting and severely wounded, she makes a deal with Voight, who was incarcerated at the time, for information about who shot Antonio. When Voight harasses Lieutenant Matthew Casey and his then-fiancée Dr. Hallie Thomas, Dawson sets up a sting to arrest Voight. The arrest goes successfully, and Voight is incarcerated.

== In Chicago P.D. ==
When Pulpo, a Colombian drug lord is arrested, Diego is kidnapped by a man named Mateo. Mateo demands that Pulpo be released or Diego will be killed. Antonio's devotion to his son is unwavering. Mateo attempts to take Diego to Indianapolis by bus, but Intelligence is able to stop him.

During his rookie years, Antonio had a partner, Sean Patterson. Sean had mistakenly filed double overtime pay, a minor infraction. However, Gradishar of Internal Affairs (IA) had Sean fired and took away his pension. The shame caused him to commit suicide a year later, leaving behind a wife and kids. Antonio has never forgiven Gradishar for using Sean as her way of climbing the corporate ladder.

He also worked with Trudy Platt, now the desk sergeant at the 21st District, during his patrol years and saved her life when she was shot by pulling her out of the line of fire. During the shooter's subsequent interrogation, Dawson broke his jaw.

He was critically wounded when Pulpo's wife helped Pulpo escape, while three other officers were killed in the aftermath. Unlike Voight, he has limits on how far he will go to catch a criminal, as shown by the fact that he asked Jay Halstead to stop Voight from killing anyone while on the hunt for Pulpo as he did not want it on his conscience.

In "Chicken, Dynamite, Chainsaw", in the locker room at the end of the shift, Sean Roman tells him about his security business. Antonio takes the job and is tempted to have an affair with the client's seductive wife.

In "An Honest Woman," he was assigned to protect Asher Roslyn. In "Assignment of the Year," he didn't know Roslyn was a felon until Roslyn was found dead, and he was implicated in the murder investigation. He confronted Roman about it, and it was revealed that Roman himself didn't know about Roslyn's criminal history. Since Roman was involved with the unit on this case, he had to cooperate with the unit in apprehending Roslyn's killer (Roslyn's own wife, who had seduced her errand boy, Terry, into committing the murder which allowed her to escape prosecution. During the course of these episodes, it was shown that Roslyn's wife, Layla, was flirting with and trying to seduce Dawson, but he turned down her advances.

In "A Little Devil Complex", he shoots and kills Trenton Lamont after he traps Gabriela Dawson in an elevator with gasoline which was poured on her and holding the lighter, when she receives a false text from Sylvie Brett telling Dawson to meet her.

In "300,000 Likes" Antonio is offered a job as lead investigator at the State's Attorney's Office, which he accepts in the next episode, "A Shot Heard Around the World".

At the end of "Reform", he gets the offer to return to Intelligence after his stint in the State's Attorney's Office.

== Appearances and Crossovers ==
The character is frequently seen on Chicago Fire as Gabby's colleagues sometimes ask him for help or advice and he is generally well-liked by the firefighters at Firehouse 51, and some after to get more information on investigations, and in Chicago P.D., after his departure.

- Chicago Fire season 1:
  - "Professional Courtesy" (October 24, 2012)
  - "Hanging On" (November 7, 2012)
  - "Rear View Mirror" (November 14, 2012)
  - "A Little Taste" (February 6, 2013)
  - "Nazdarovya!" (February 13, 2013)
  - "Retaliation Hit" (May 1, 2013)
  - "Leaders Lead" (May 8, 2013)
  - "Let Her Go" (May 15, 2013)
- Chicago Fire season 2:
  - "A Problem House" (September 24, 2013)
  - "Prove It" (October 1, 2013)
  - "A Nuisance Call" (October 15, 2013)
  - "Joyriding" (November 12, 2013)
  - "You Will Hurt Him" (December 3, 2013)
  - "Not Like This" (December 10, 2013)
  - "Shoved in My Face" (January 7, 2014)
  - "Virgin Skin" (February 25, 2014)
  - "A Dark Day (1)" (April 29, 2014)
- Chicago Fire season 3:
  - "Three Bells" (February 3, 2015)
  - "We Called Her Jellybean" (April 28, 2015)
  - "Category 5" (May 5, 2015)
  - "Spartacus" (May 12, 2015)
- Chicago Fire season 4:
  - "Let It Burn" (October 12, 2015)
  - "Your Day Is Coming" (November 3, 2015)
  - "When Tortoises Fly" (December 1, 2015)
  - "Short and Fat" (December 8, 2015)
  - "The Path of Destruction" (January 19, 2016)
  - "The Sky Is Falling" (February 2, 2016)
  - "All Hard Parts" (February 9, 2016)
  - "On the Warpath" (April 5, 2016)
  - "I Will Be Walking" (April 19, 2016)
  - "Where the Collapse Started" (May 10, 2016)
- Law & Order: Special Victims Unit - "Nationwide Manhunt" (February 10, 2016)
- Chicago Fire season 5:
  - "The Hose or the Animal" (October 11, 2016)
  - "Scorched Earth" (October 25, 2016)
  - "That Day" (November 22, 2016)
  - "Lift Each Other" (November 29, 2016)
  - "One Hundred" (December 6, 2016)
  - "An Agent of the Machine" (February 7, 2017)
- Chicago P.D. - "Seven Indictments" (February 15, 2017)
- Chicago P.D. - "Emotional Proximity" (March 1, 2017)
- Chicago Fire season 6:
  - "A Man's Legacy" (January 4, 2018)
  - "The Whole Point of Being Roommates" (January 11, 2018)
  - "Slamigan" (January 25, 2018)
  - "Hiding Not Seeking" (March 8, 2018)
  - "Looking for a Lifeline" (March 14, 2018)
  - "The Chance to Forgive" (March 22, 2018)
  - "Where I Want To Be" (April 19, 2018)
  - "Make This Right" (January 23, 2019)

== Reception ==
Regarding his exit, Gina Zippilli of the Meet Us at Molly's podcast stated that "Antonio deserved better."
