= Chicago Fire season 2 =

Chicago Fire
- Season 2
- Chicago Fire Season 2 DVD cover
- Showrunners: Matt Olmstead; Michael Brandt; Derek Haas
- No. of episodes: 22

Release
- Original network: NBC
- Original release: September 24, 2013 – May 13, 2014

Season chronology
- ← Previous; Season 1 Next → Season 3

The second season of Chicago Fire, an American drama television series with executive producer Dick Wolf, and producers Derek Haas, Michael Brandt, and Matt Olmstead, premiered on September 24, 2013, but on a new timeslot on Tuesday at 10:00 pm from Wednesday at 10:00 pm, on the NBC television network. The season concluded on May 13, 2014, and consisted of 22 episodes.

== Overview ==
The show follows the lives of the firefighters and paramedics working for the Chicago Fire Department at the firehouse of Engine 51, Truck 81, Squad 3, Ambulance 61 and Battalion 25.

== Cast and characters ==
=== Main cast ===
- Jesse Spencer as Lieutenant Matthew Casey, Truck 81
- Taylor Kinney as Lieutenant Kelly Severide, Squad 3
- Monica Raymund as Paramedic in Charge Gabriela Dawson, Ambulance 61
- Lauren German as Paramedic Leslie Shay, Ambulance 61
- Charlie Barnett as Firefighter Peter Mills, Truck 81/Squad 3
- Eamonn Walker as Battalion Chief Wallace Boden, Battalion 25
- David Eigenberg as Firefighter Christopher Hermann, Truck 81
- Yuri Sardarov as Firefighter Brian "Otis" Zvonecek, Truck 81
- Joe Minoso as Firefighter/Driver Joe Cruz, Truck 81
- Christian Stolte as Firefighter Randy "Mouch" McHolland, Truck 81

=== Recurring cast ===
- Jeff Hephner as Firefighter Jeff Clarke, Squad 3
- Randy Flagler as Firefighter Harold Capp, Squad 3
- Anthony Ferraris as Firefighter Tony Ferraris, Squad 3
- Treat Williams as Benny Severide
- Chaon Cross as Heather Darden
- Michelle Forbes as Gail McLeod
- John Hoogenakker as Lieutenant Spellman, Engine 51
- Vedette Lim as Devon
- William Smillie as Kevin Hadley
- David Pasquesi as Paramedic Erik McAuley, Ambulance 61
- Victoria Blade as Lisa Clarke
- Alex Weisman as Paramedic Alan Chout, Ambulance 61
- Melissa Ponzio as Donna Robbins
- Dylan Baker as Doctor David Arata
- Brittany Curran as Katie Nolan
- Daisy Betts as Firefighter Candidate Rebecca Jones, Truck 81
- Christine Evangelista as Paramedic Allison Rafferty, Ambulance 61
- Brent Seabrook as friend of Clarke
- Duncan Keith as friend of Clarke

=== Chicago P.D. characters ===
- Jon Seda as Detective Antonio Dawson
- LaRoyce Hawkins as Officer Kevin Atwater
- Jesse Lee Soffer as Detective Jay Halstead
- Jason Beghe as Sergeant Henry "Hank" Voight
- Sophia Bush as Detective Erin Lindsay
- Elias Koteas as Detective Alvin Olinsky
- Marina Squerciati as Officer Kim Burgess
- Amy Morton as Desk Sergeant Trudy Platt
- Melissa Mercer Laneville as nurse in hallway

== Episodes ==
| No. overall | No. in season | Title | Directed by | Written by | Original release date | Prod. code | U.S. viewers (millions) |
|---|---|---|---|---|---|---|---|
| 25 | 1 | "A Problem House" | Joe Chappelle | Michael Brandt & Derek Haas | September 24, 2013 | 201 | 8.90 |
Severide finds himself being targeted by a dangerous arsonist, after building fires turn up the same incendiary device known to be the arsonist's typical weapon. Firehouse 51 takes on new blood and new rules to avoid shuttering its doors due to budget cuts. Casey finds himself with new responsibilities after Heather Darden asks his help with her sons, the older of whom struggles deeper after his father's death. Heather's night out with her girlfriends ends with Heather in a drunk driving crash that injures her friend seriously.
| 26 | 2 | "Prove It" | Tom DiCillo | Andrea Newman | October 1, 2013 | 202 | 8.74 |
Casey needs to get involved deeper with Heather's sons now that she's been jailed for drunk driving, and he tells the boys only that their mother went on a trip. Severide goes in pursuit of the arsonist after another close call—and, after his first suspect is disproven, he notices a particular pattern to the fires. The state official in charge of searching for budget cuts in the fire department enlists a mole in Firehouse 51, a firefighter transferred to 51 after his house was closed. Fearful of arbitrary budget cutting, and suspicious of the candidate for the union presidency, Mouch decides to run for the position. When Heather's friend dies of her crash injuries, Heather faces vehicular manslaughter and takes a fateful plea bargain before Casey can talk to her again.
| 27 | 3 | "Defcon 1" | Joe Chappelle | Michael Gilvary | October 8, 2013 | 203 | 7.43 |
As Molly's bar continues to struggle, Mouch gets a campaign assist from a friend of Dawson's. Severide tries to find proof that Kevin Hadley, one of his former men on Squad 3, was the arsonist. Dawson makes an unexpected move.
| 28 | 4 | "A Nuisance Call" | Steve Shill | Matt Olmstead & Hilly Hicks, Jr. | October 15, 2013 | 204 | 8.08 |
A routine call becomes the suicide of a diabetic acquaintance of Shay's, causing a rift between her and Dawson. The men of 51 are on alert for a mole in the firehouse. Meanwhile, Severide goes stealth in his pursuit of Hadley. Dawson gets some shocking news about one of Arthur's henchmen Jay.
| 29 | 5 | "A Power Move" | Jann Turner | Andi Bushell | October 22, 2013 | 205 | 7.45 |
Pressure is on Boden to resign from the firehouse. The mole is revealed and the men form a plan to run him out of the house. Arthur the thug continues to cause trouble at Molly's, while Dawson struggles letting Jay—whom she now knows is an undercover cop trying to bring Arthur down—do his job.
| 30 | 6 | "Joyriding" | Steve Shill | Derek Haas & Tim Talbott | November 12, 2013 | 206 | 7.66 |
Severide gets an unexpected visitor and troublesome news about his father. His day goes from bad to worse after his morning jog turns into a rescue when he sees a boy trapped in an excavator. Mouch and fellow union presidential candidate Greg Sullivan participate in a debate that threatens to become nasty. Arthur comes to harass Dawson at Molly's again. Concurrently, rival bar Game Day down the street is also in peril and fingers point to Molly's. Boden's alarm over the missing Severide is matched only by his continuing feud with McLeod.
| 31 | 7 | "No Regrets" | Michael Slovis | Michael Brandt & Ryan Rege Harris | November 19, 2013 | 207 | 7.49 |
McLeod threatens to break Boden and Firehouse 51 after Boden refuses to sign the forced retirement agreement. The men are called to a train which derailed into a factory. McLeod's budget cuts mean that they are stretched to their limits dealing with a flaming propane tank and multiple victims. After Mouch's campaign manager Isabella tells Casey she'll reach out to state contacts on Heather's behalf, Heather is released from prison early and makes a life-changing decision.
| 32 | 8 | "Rhymes with Shout" | Joe Chappelle | Andrea Newman | November 26, 2013 | 208 | 6.91 |
After helping her sons reconcile to their father's death at last, Casey says an emotional good-bye to Heather and the boys, who are moving to Florida to start over. Still weary over her dispute with Shay, Dawson also struggles with a new, overly sensitive, too-talkative paramedic. Severide tries befriending his newly-discovered half sister Katie. Cruz takes his relationship with Zoya one step further as her visa is due to expire. Isabella seeks a relationship with Mills and springs for his tuxedo to escort her to a political dinner. Otis and Severide return to their apartment after their shift and discovers it's been ransacked, especially Shay's room. Casey rethinks his feelings for Dawson.
| 33 | 9 | "You Will Hurt Him" | Sanford Bookstaver | Michael Gilvary | December 3, 2013 | 209 | 8.22 |
Dawson and Casey's romance escalates. A broken Shay contemplates suicide and Severide asks Dawson to help her. Joe's younger brother Leon helps Voight's Intelligence Unit imprison the new leader of his former gang for killing a young girl. Severide continues bonding with half-sister Katie. Mills learns that he has a place at the Police Academy. Boden gets a visit from McLeod, who has found more than a few ways to close down 51. Otis re-thinks living with Severide and Shay after Shay's girlfriend Devon's burglary leaves Shay further distraught in hand with her continuing discomfort at 51.
| 34 | 10 | "Not Like This" | Alex Chapple | Michael Brandt & Derek Haas | December 10, 2013 | 210 | 9.32 |
With 51 on the verge of closing, the community rallies in protest; Casey, Mouch and Severide each do their part in a last ditch attempt to stop the closure while Boden gets some help from an unlikely person. Dawson gets some career-changing news: she's been accepted as a firefighter candidate. Mouch tries to get union president Sullivan into going to bat for 51, as Sullivan's shaky personal life unexpectedly makes headlines, and the union and state senator come through. The men of 51 come together when they nearly lose one of their own at a massive apartment fire and Clarke becomes a suspect in the murder of his wife's former lover.
| 35 | 11 | "Shoved in My Face" | Jean de Segonzac | Hilly Hicks, Jr. | January 7, 2014 | 211 | 6.87 |
Casey returns to the firehouse after nearly being killed in the apartment fire but experiences spells of double vision. Shay meets her new partner, Allison, who takes to everyone in 51 except Shay, whose sexuality unnerves her. Dawson starts her training at the Fire Academy. Severide starts his temporary teaching job at the Academy and has misgivings about a particularly eager candidate. Molly's continues on shaky ground. Clarke continues refusing to talk to police about the murder of his wife's lover—even after the murder weapon turns out to resemble a weapon Clarke owns from his days as a Marine.
| 36 | 12 | "Out with a Bang" | Alik Sakharov | Andrea Newman | January 14, 2014 | 212 | 6.76 |
Casey tries to convince everyone, and himself, at the firehouse that he is alright. Meanwhile Shay is being targeted by lawyers asking about witnessing her friend Darryl's suicide. Boden helps out a citizen, Donna, with a neglectful landlord—and Donna surprises him by flirtatiously giving him a cooked cover dish as thanks. Dawson must overcome her claustrophobia and having seen a fellow candidate—Rebecca Jones, the daughter of a deputy district fire chief—cheat on a test. Mills makes the squad but quickly finds himself in hot water with a reporter. Otis bonds with Severide's half-sister Katie over board games.
| 37 | 13 | "Tonight's the Night" | Jann Turner | Derek Haas & Tim Talbott | January 21, 2014 | 213 | 7.13 |
During a frigid, cold night in Chicago, Firehouse 51 responds to a car crash when a blackout occurs and leaves an entire district without electricity or power. The men are swamped when locals flock to firehouse seeking a warm place during the blackout. Clarke gets caught up in a looting and held at gunpoint while getting supplies at a store and Boden has to deal with unwelcome guests at the firehouse—even as a romance with Donna continues. Severide breaks up a nasty confrontation among the firehouse guests. Casey struggles with memory loss and headaches. Herrmann, Dawson and Otis continue to debate on future plans for Molly's. Severide's sister Katie goes missing.
| 38 | 14 | "Virgin Skin" | Karen Gaviola | Michael Brandt & Ryan Rege Harris | February 25, 2014 | 214 | 7.06 |
Severide continues his search for Katie—who's been kidnapped by associates of the thug he threw out of the firehouse during the blackout—and turns to Chicago police for help. Casey begins bleeding in his ear and the doctor's diagnosis could potentially end his career. Firehouse 51 gets a call about a person crushing his hand in a conveyor belt. Severide takes matters into his own hands to find Katie. Rafferty is sued by a victim claiming his religious beliefs trump her effort to save his life. Fearing his past relationship mistakes will ruin his new relationship, Boden reluctantly breaks up with Donna. Shay gets an unexpected tip from a pair of professional hockey players. The men find a way to repay a young victim who had supported them when 51 was nearly closed down.
| 39 | 15 | "Keep Your Mouth Shut" | Holly Dale | Michael Gilvary | March 4, 2014 | 215 | 7.07 |
Firehouse 51 gets a call of a person stuck in a donation bin. Having failed at the Fire Academy, Dawson returns to Ambulance 61. But her fellow candidate Rebecca Jones is 51's new candidate. Casey and his crew are frustrated with Rebecca. Severide gets some unwelcome news about Vince Keeler, the man who orchestrated Katie's kidnapping. Mouch learns Boden's secretary Connie can be his worst enemy or his best friend.
| 40 | 16 | "A Rocket Blasting Off" | Sanford Bookstaver | Matt Olmstead & Hilly Hicks, Jr. | March 11, 2014 | 216 | 7.21 |
Severide and Otis are among the 51 members questioned about the disappearance of Katie's kidnappers, with Severide now a possible suspect. Dawson considers reapplying to the academy. Meanwhile, Hermann wants to get a vasectomy as an anniversary gift for his wife, much to his colleagues' horror. Casey and Boden are ordered by Rebecca's father, the Deputy District Chief, to force her to transfer to a desk job.
| 41 | 17 | "When Things Got Rough" | Jann Turner | Andrea Newman | March 18, 2014 | 217 | 6.96 |
Firehouse 51 get a call to a house engulfed in flames. Casey discovers that the father had thrown himself over his children to shield them from the fire and the team mourn his heroic sacrifice. Unfortunately, the crew are sued by the deceased man's wife for failing to save him. Mouch gets dumped by his girlfriend. Dawson is being stalked by a dispatcher. Severide saves a man whose arm got stuck in a wheel well and also finds out that he's a former firefighter.
| 42 | 18 | "Until Your Feet Leave the Ground" | Michael Slovis | Matt Olmstead & Mick Betancourt | April 8, 2014 | 218 | 6.96 |
Firehouse 51 attends a call of a man wedged between two buildings. Severide attempts to get the former firefighter he previously rescued, Dave, to go to rehab to help with alcohol and pain killer addictions after he is arrested for DUI. Dawson and Casey run into relationship issues. Meanwhile, Dawson and Shay have a girls only weekend retreat together and Mouch is gearing up for his first date since his breakup with help from his colleagues who augment his Internet dating profile. The team helps a man who wants to commit suicide by jumping off a high ledge. Casey tries to help Rebecca—who knows her father's machinations—with her situation.
| 43 | 19 | "A Heavy Weight" | Reza Tabrizi | Michael Gilvary | April 15, 2014 | 219 | 6.90 |
After Rebecca's suicide, everybody at Firehouse 51 is affected by it and tension is high within the ranks of the firehouse. Dawson receives Rebecca's suicide note but will not say what it says. Meanwhile, Casey is looking for rings to propose to Dawson. During a call at a gas station fire, one of the bystanders tries to help a victim, almost with disastrous results. Severide brings in firefighters from Colorado to help Dave by telling him that he made the right decision in the fire five years ago. Boden finds out that Donna is pregnant.
| 44 | 20 | "A Dark Day" | Joe Chappelle | Story by : Dick Wolf & Matt Olmstead; Teleplay by : Michael Brandt & Derek Haas | April 29, 2014 | 220 | 7.06 |
A major explosion occurs at the start line of a CFD and CPD 10k charity run outside a Chicago Medical Center which Dawson and Casey are taking part in. It sends the people of Chicago into chaos with both local and federal law enforcement agencies rushing to find the perpetrators. Mills discovers and races coolly to disarm a second bomb in an underground parking garage. Dawson is trapped under the rubble and Casey and Severide race against time to find her while their colleagues continue to assist victims above ground. This episode begins a crossover with Chicago P.D. that concludes on "8.30 PM". It is included on the Chicago P.D. Season 1 DVD set.
| 45 | 21 | "One More Shot" | Jean de Segonzac | Andrea Newman | May 6, 2014 | 221 | 6.92 |
Firehouse 51 receives a call of a man stuck in a wood chipper. Dawson prepares to retake the firefighters exam and Squad 3 gets a new firefighter. Meanwhile, Casey asks Antonio for Dawson's hand in marriage, for which Antonio gives his blessing. Elsewhere, Shay deals with the fallout with the reappearance of Devon, her runaway ex who had stolen from her, Severide and Otis. Boden finally shakes his past away and—with her students as witnesses—proposes to Donna.
| 46 | 22 | "Real Never Waits" | Michael Brandt | Michael Brandt & Derek Haas | May 13, 2014 | 222 | 7.12 |
A victim found at a boarding school fire has Severide questioning if he could have done more. Dawson retakes her firefighter's exam, which she passes, and is scheduled to transfer to a different firehouse with Casey's full support. Meanwhile, Mills still questions his father's mysterious death. Severide throws out Shay's ex-girlfriend. After Herrmann can't swing a church wedding for Boden and Donna, he surprises them with a firehouse wedding—where Casey proposes to Dawson and Mouch meets a woman who seems interested in him. Before Dawson can answer Casey's proposal, 51 gets another call of a mysterious building fire. As communications from inside the building to Boden become blocked, the building explodes while everyone is inside, leaving the lives of everyone inside of the building hanging in the balance and Boden frantically screaming on his radio for Firehouse 51 to call for help as he watches from his command post.

== Production ==
On April 26, 2013, NBC renewed Chicago Fire for a second season and moved its time slot to Tuesdays at 10:00 pm EST. The season debuted on September 24, 2013.

=== Crossovers ===
A crossover between the two Chicago shows aired on April 29 and 30, 2014, depicting an explosion that brings the fire and police departments together.

== Home media ==
The DVD release of season two was released in Region 1 on September 2, 2014.

The Complete Second Season
| Set details | | | Special features |
| 22 episodes; 934 minutes (Region 1); 5-disc set; 1.78:1 aspect ratio; Languages: English (Dolby Digital 5.1); Subtitles: English (Region 1) | | | Behind the Scenes; I Am a Firefighter Digital Series; "Stepping Stone" – Chicago P.D. Pilot Episode; "8:30 PM" – The conclusion of the two-part Chicago Fire/Chicago P.D. crossover event |
| Release dates | | | Behind the Scenes; I Am a Firefighter Digital Series; "Stepping Stone" – Chicago P.D. Pilot Episode; "8:30 PM" – The conclusion of the two-part Chicago Fire/Chicago P.D. crossover event |
| United States | United Kingdom | Australia | Behind the Scenes; I Am a Firefighter Digital Series; "Stepping Stone" – Chicago P.D. Pilot Episode; "8:30 PM" – The conclusion of the two-part Chicago Fire/Chicago P.D. crossover event |
| September 2, 2014 | | | Behind the Scenes; I Am a Firefighter Digital Series; "Stepping Stone" – Chicago P.D. Pilot Episode; "8:30 PM" – The conclusion of the two-part Chicago Fire/Chicago P.D. crossover event |
