= Switch (game show) =

American game show

- Genre: Game show
- Directed by: Rob George
- Presented by: Jeff Hephner
- Country of origin: United States
- Original language: English
- No. of seasons: 3
- No. of episodes: 165

Production
- Executive producers: Tony DiSanto; Nick Rigg; Rich Sirop
- Running time: 20–22 minutes
- Production companies: Panenka; DIGA Studios; Game Show Enterprises

Original release
- Network: Game Show Network
- Release: January 30, 2023 – July 16, 2024

Switch is an American game show hosted by Jeff Hephner and premiered on Game Show Network from January 30, 2023 to July 16, 2024. It was based on the Belgian game show of the same name.

== Gameplay ==
The game is played over a qualifying speed round and three rounds of questions, in which five contestants stand behind numbered podiums and attempt to take the #1 podium while avoiding the lowest ranks. The player occupying podium #1 at the end of the show plays the "Big Switch" for $10,000.

=== Speed Round ===
The game begins with a qualifying "speed round" of four questions. Host Hephner asks a question, and the first player to buzz in is allowed to answer. If the contestant is correct, they begin the game at the highest-ranked unoccupied podium (beginning with podium #1), while if the contestant is wrong, they begin at the lowest-ranked unoccupied podium (beginning with #5). Once four podiums are occupied, the last contestant takes the remaining podium.

=== Round 1 ===
Hephner asks a series of five questions, each with three choices, and the contestants then secretly lock in their answers. Usually, Hephner will then ask one of the contestants what answer they locked in. After the correct answer is given, the question results are revealed. Any contestant who answered the question correctly has their podium light up in green, while a wrong answer lights up their podium in red.

The contestants are then reranked so that the contestants who got that question right are given the highest-ranked podiums in descending order of previous ranking, followed by the contestants who got it wrong in descending order; the contestants then switch their positions (hence the title of the show) if necessary to correspond to their new ranking. For example, if the contestants at podiums 2 and 4 got the question right, and the contestants at 1, 3, and 5 got it wrong, the contestants that were at 2 and 4 would move up to podiums 1 and 2, respectively, and the contestants that were at 1, 3, and 5 would move down to 3, 4, and 5, respectively.

After five questions, the contestant that occupies podium #5 is eliminated from further play. The remaining four contestants carry their current rankings and podiums into the second round.

=== Round 2 ===
This round is played similarly to Round 1, with the contestants being asked four questions. The contestant that occupies podium #4 at the end of this round is also eliminated.

=== Round 3 ===
This round is played similarly, with the contestants being asked three questions. After the third question, the contestant that occupies podium #1 wins $1,000 and plays the "Big Switch" to increase their winnings to $10,000.

=== The Big Switch ===
The day's winner begins the round at podium #5. Hephner asks a series of open-ended questions. For each correct answer, the contestant moves up one podium, while for every incorrect answer, the contestant must move down one podium. However, the contestant cannot move back past podium #5. (This is in contrast to the original Belgian version, in which an incorrect answer required the contestant to return to podium #5).

The contestant has 60 seconds to work their way up the podiums in this manner and answer a question correctly while at podium #1. If the contestant is successful, their winnings are increased to $10,000. If not, they leave with their winnings from the main game.

== Production ==
The series was announced on November 2, 2022, with Jeff Hephner as host. The show premiered on January 30, 2023.

== International versions ==
Legend:

- Currently airing
- No longer airing
- Upcoming version

Country	Title	Channel	Presenter(s)	Airdates
Belgium (original format)	Switch	Eén; VRT 1	Adriaan Van den Hoof (2016–2022); Fien Germijns (2022–present)	June 27, 2016 – present
Brazil	Quem Sabe, Sobe! (segment of Domingo Legal)	SBT	Celso Portiolli	August 2, 2026 – present
Germany	Quizz dich auf 1	WDR	Guido Cantz	March 27 – August 31, 2020
Greece	Switch	ERT1	Evgenia Samara	September 18, 2023 – June 27, 2025
Netherlands	Switch	NPO 3	Klaas van der Eerden	January 29 – August 2, 2018

The quiz show, according to the VRT, is currently in development in Spain, Mexico and Turkey.
