= An Acceptable Loss =

2018 film directed by Joe Chappelle

- Directed by: Joe Chappelle
- Written by: Joe Chappelle
- Produced by: Colleen Griffen
- Starring: Tika Sumpter; Jamie Lee Curtis; Ben Tavassoli; Jeff Hephner; Deanna Dunagan
- Cinematography: Petra Korner
- Edited by: Joe Rabig
- Music by: Valgeir Sigurðsson
- Production company: CorradoMooncoin
- Distributed by: IFC Films
- Release dates: October 13, 2018 (Chicago); January 18, 2019 (United States)
- Running time: 102 minutes
- Country: United States
- Language: English
- Box office: $32,452

An Acceptable Loss is a 2018 American political thriller film written and directed by Joe Chappelle and starring Tika Sumpter and Jamie Lee Curtis. It had its world premiere at the Chicago International Film Festival on October 13, 2018. It was released on January 18, 2019, by IFC Films.

== Plot ==
National security expert Elizabeth "Libby" Lamm is hired as an adjunct professor of foreign policy at the prestigious Grant University. She is the former national security adviser to U.S. Vice President Rachel Burke. She arrives amid protests and the university employees are cold to her, including her assistant and another professor who confronts her at a university mixer. Dr. Lamm is recognizable due to a Capital Dispatch op-ed where she explains and defends her role in an attack by US forces, revealed later in the film to be a strike on Homs.

Dr. Lamm is extra cautious about security, preferring to live her daily life without an email address, cell phone, landline or computer. Every night, she comes home to her study and writes feverishly on note pads at her desk. She has over a dozen of them completely filled and locks them in a vintage safe that she purchased from an antique shop. She walks around her home with a loaded Glock 17 and is always alerted to unfamiliar sounds. Dr. Lamm is being stalked by Martin Salhi, a graduate student at the university. Martin is withdrawn and sullen, and is intentionally standoffish from his roommate Jordan. Martin follows her home and later creates fake lawn service flyers as pretext to case her home. He breaks into her home and installs miniature cameras to observe her movements. He watches Dr. Lamm place the note pads in the safe.

One day, Dr. Lamm is approached at her home by Adrian, the president's chief of staff. It is revealed that they were lovers when he was a policy adviser in the White House. He wants assurances that she will not reveal details of the Homs operation but she rebuffs him. A few days later, Adrian returns, this time demanding fidelity to the administration. Dr. Lamm angrily refuses. This incident prompts her to dismiss her class and rush home where she finds Martin breaking into her safe. While holding him at gunpoint, Martin admits to stalking and states that he was trying to understand how someone who could commit such an enormous atrocity, referring to the attack on Homs. He tells her that his parents and siblings lived in Homs and that he wanted "to understand the face of evil." Dr. Lamm then gives him the note pads she had been writing on to read. She is writing a memoir that she wants to be published that exposes the aggression behind the attack.

Four years earlier, Dr. Lamm is in the White House situation room and advises on a plan with a high-security group including the president and vice-president. She tells the group that five leaders of the most dangerous terrorist groups in the world, plus a nuclear scientist, will be meeting in Homs, Syria to discuss strategy. Dr. Lamm favors more conventional action but she is interrupted by Vice President Burke who overwhelmingly endorses Plan 712. The plan involves a nuclear strike that will result in an extreme mass casualty loss. Dr. Lamm ultimately and reluctantly endorses the plan. The attack kills the intended targets as well as causing the deaths of 150,000 civilians. It's revealed that the intel used in the attack was manufactured by Dr. Lamm on Burke's orders.

As Martin finishes reading, her home is broken into by undercover agents. Dr. Lamm and Martin escape and go on the run. Her intention is to take the memoir to her father Phillip Lamm, chief editor of the Springfield Register. They spend the night on the beach but Martin awakens to find Dr. Lamm gone, but the note pads were left with him. Dr. Lamm awakes in a basement and is approached by Adrian and current President Rachel Burke. President Burke tries to convince her to join her cabinet as Secretary of State in exchange for burying the memoir. Dr. Lamm realizes that the agents left the memoir with Martin and are surveilling him, hoping that he would lead them to more copies if there are any. She refuses President Burke's offer and is prepared to accept whatever consequences that come from its publication.

The president leaves and tells Adrian to release Dr. Lamm and end the surveillance on Martin. She believes she will be exonerated by the public by asserting the years of domestic safety as proof of its success. Adrian objects, believing that by not neutralizing the two, it will be political suicide. The president disagrees and overrules him. Dr. Lamm is released across the street from the Springfield Register. She enters the lobby and sees Martin and her father there. Suddenly a bomb explodes and destroys the lobby. It is revealed that Adrian acted on his own. Twenty-three people are confirmed dead including Dr. Lamm, her father and Martin, with the attack being blamed on him. After the apartment they shared was searched by the FBI, Jordan opens an email from Martin that was sent earlier. It's revealed that Martin had secretly bought a burner phone after losing the men that were following him, scanned the memoir and then emailed it to Jordan, asking him to give it to the media to reveal the truth.

== Cast ==
- Tika Sumpter as Elizabeth "Libby" Lamm
- Jamie Lee Curtis as Rachel Burke
- Ben Tavassoli as Martin Sali
- Jeff Hephner as Adrian
- Deanna Dunagan as Dr. Willa Sipe
- Alex Weisman as Jordan
- Clarke Peters as Phillip Lamm
- Rex Linn as The President
- Ali Burch as Dee

== Production ==
Chappelle completed the final draft of the script, originally titled The Pages, in January 2017. Tika Sumpter, Jamie Lee Curtis and Ben Tavassoli were cast as leads in June 2017. Production began shortly thereafter in Chicago, Illinois. A large portion of the film was shot at Northwestern University, Chappelle and producer Colleen Griffen's alma mater.

== Release ==
IFC Films acquired distribution rights to the film in October 2018. It had its world premiere at the Chicago International Film Festival on October 13, 2018. It was released on January 18, 2019. Its release for Blu-ray and DVD sales took place on July 2, 2019 by Shout! Factory.

== Reception ==
=== Box office ===
An Acceptable Loss grossed $32,452 in the United States and Canada.

=== Critical response ===
On review aggregator Rotten Tomatoes, the film holds a 12% approval rating based on 33 reviews, with an average rating of 4.6/10. The website's critics consensus reads, "An Acceptable Loss attempts a political thriller approach to a serious issue, but ends up sacrificing thrills -- as well as a satisfying story -- in the bargain." Metacritic reports a weighted average score of 40 out of 100, based on 11 reviews, indicating "mixed or average" reviews.
