= Thieves Quartet =

- Directed by: Joe Chappelle
- Written by: Joe Chappelle
- Produced by: Colleen Griffen
- Starring: Michele Cole; James Denton
- Cinematography: Greg Littlewood
- Edited by: Randy Bricker; Scott Taradash
- Music by: John Zorn
- Production company: Mooncoin
- Distributed by: Headliner Entertainment Group
- Release date: 1993
- Running time: 90 minutes
- Country: United States
- Language: English

Thieves Quartet is a 1993 American thriller film directed by Joe Chappelle and starring Michele Cole and James Denton.

== Premise ==
In Chicago, four desperate criminals kidnap a businessman's daughter, only to find their plans unravel.

== Cast ==
- Phillip Van Lear as Jimmy Fuqua
- Joe Guastaferro as Art Bledsoe
- Michele Cole as Jessica Sutter
- James "Ike" Eichling as Mike Quinn
- Richard Henzel as Morgan Luce
- Jamie Denton as Ray Higgs
- Dawn Maxey as Jill Luce

== Reception ==
Steven Gaydos of Variety wrote that the film features "first-rate performances" but has "a routine, by-the-numbers plot". Stephen Holden of The New York Times wrote, "Although a standard genre movie with film-noir overtones, it nevertheless has a conviction that is missing in many of its slicker Hollywood forerunners."
