= Jeff Hephner =

American actor

Jeffrey Hephner
- Education: Sand Creek High School (MI)
- Alma mater: Calvin College; Ferris State University
- Occupation: Actor
- Years active: 2000–present

Jeffrey Hephner is an American actor, best known for the role of Jeff Clarke, first on the NBC television series Chicago Fire and then on its sister show, Chicago Med. On film, he co-starred with Jennifer Garner in the action thriller film Peppermint (2018). He also appears in the 2016 National Geographic TV series MARS and the Apple TV+ original science fiction space drama series For All Mankind. In January 2019, he co-starred in the film An Acceptable Loss. In 2023, he began hosting the game show Switch on Game Show Network.

Hephner has appeared in over 50 other films and television shows, including as Morgan Stanley Buffkin in the CW series Easy Money (2008–2009), and as Ben Zajac in the Starz political drama Boss (2011–2012). In 2015, he starred as the title character in the short-lived TNT action drama Agent X.

== Early life ==
Hephner is the youngest of three children born to Tom and Patti Hephner. He grew up in the small town of Sand Creek, Michigan, in southern Michigan near Adrian. Hephner was athletic growing up, playing basketball and football, and he graduated from Sand Creek High School. Hephner was named to the all-state team for Class C-D for the 1993–1994 season.

He attended and played basketball for Calvin College in Grand Rapids, Michigan for two years before transferring to Ferris State University in Big Rapids, Michigan for two years.

== Career ==
Hephner began his Hollywood career with small roles in two feature films, Tigerland (2000) and Maid in Manhattan (2002). After starring in the short-lived Fox series The Jury in 2004, in 2005, he guest-starred in the NBC series Law & Order: Criminal Intent in season 4: episode 21 titled "The Unblinking Eye". Hephner starred as author Pat Conroy in the Hallmark Hall of Fame TV movie The Water Is Wide (2006), based on Conroy's book and a remake of the drama Conrack (1974).

He starred in The CW series Easy Money, which aired for four episodes in October 2008 before being cancelled. The other four episodes aired in mid-2009. Following the cancellation of Easy Money, Hephner guest-starred in Private Practice, CSI: Crime Scene Investigation, NCIS, Castle and had a recurring role in four episodes of the NBC medical drama Mercy. In 2010, Hephner replaced Ben Browder in a recurring role in the CW series Hellcats as football coach Red Raymond.

BuddyTV ranked Hephner #86 on its list of "TV's Sexiest Men of 2011". In 2011, Hephner was cast in the NBC series The Playboy Club, but was replaced by Eddie Cibrian before filming began. From 2011 to 2012, Hephner played Ben Zajac in the Starz political drama series Boss. From 2013 to 2014, Hephner had a recurring role in the second season of the NBC drama Chicago Fire. In 2015, Hephner co-starred with Sharon Stone in the TNT series Agent X.

From 2016 to 2017, Hephner reprised his role as Jeff Clarke in Chicago Fire's medical spinoff Chicago Med, where Clarke returns to medical school. He appeared in the first season finale and recurred in the show until towards the end of the second season. In 2018, Hephner starred as Kurt Hurrelle in season two of Mars on NatGeo.

From 2021 to 2023 he had a recurring role as Kevin Whitman in the Starz series Power Book II: Ghost. Since 2023 Hephner has hosted the Game Show Network’s Switch.

== Personal life ==
Hephner is married and has three children.

== Filmography ==
=== Film ===
Year	Title	Role	Notes
2000	Tigerland	McManus	
2002	So How Do You Feel About Your Watch	Jason	Short film
2002	Maid in Manhattan	Harold the Room Service Waiter	
2002	The Outlands	Adam	Short film
2003	Romantic Love	Romek Skalski	Short film
2008	What Makes Alex Tick	Rob	Short film
2008	Shoot First and Pray You Live (Because Luck Has Nothing to Do with It)	Red Pierre	
2013	Free Ride	Bossman	
2014	Interstellar	Doctor	
2018	Peppermint	Chris North	
2019	An Acceptable Loss	Adrian	
2021	The Shuroo Process	Adrian	
2023	Oppenheimer	Congressman	

=== Television ===
Year	Title	Role	Notes
2004	The Jury	Keenan O'Brien	10 episodes
2005	Law & Order: Criminal Intent	Michael Pike	Episode: "The Unblinking Eye"
2005	Criminal Minds	Boy in Image (Uncredited)	Episode: "Extreme Aggressor"
2005–2006	The O.C.	Matt Ramsey	13 episodes
2006	The Wedding Album	Jake	TV movie
2006	Capitol Law	Jason	TV movie
2006	The Water Is Wide	Pat Conroy	TV movie
2007	CSI: Miami	Keith Reynolds	Episode: "Bang, Bang, Your Debt"
2007	Without a Trace	Roy	Episode: "Run"
2008	Nip/Tuck	Kyle Ainge	Episode: "Kyle Ainge"
2008	House	Sean	Episode: "Frozen"
2008	Cold Case	David Nelson	Episode: "The Road"
2008–2009	Easy Money	Morgan Stanley Buffkin	8 episodes
2009	CSI: Crime Scene Investigation	Wayne Smith	Episode: "Death and the Maiden"
2009	Mercy	Pete Boswick	4 episodes
2010	NCIS	Commander Peter Sheridan	Episode: "Ignition"
2010	Private Practice	Jerry	Episode: "Shotgun"
2010	Ghost Whisperer	Alex	Episode: "Dead Eye"
2010	Drop Dead Diva	Jack Bryant	Episode: "Home Away from Home"
2010	The 19th Wife	Hiram	TV movie
2010–2011	Hellcats	Red Raymond	13 episodes
2011	Castle	Edmund / Zalman Drake	Episode: "Poof! You're Dead"
2011–2012	Boss	Ben Zajac / Alex Zajac	18 episodes
2012	CSI: NY	Evan Westcott	Episode: "Unspoken"
2013	King & Maxwell	Brady Ritter	2 episodes
2013–2017	Chicago Fire	Jeff Clarke	20 episodes
2014	Madam Secretary	Isaac Bishop	Episode: "Another Benghazi"
2015	Agent X	John Case / Agent X	10 episodes
2016	Code Black	Ed Harbert	5 episodes
2016–2017	Chicago Med	Jeff Clarke	16 episodes
2018	Mars	Kurt Hurrelle	Season 2, 6 episodes
2018	Queen of the South	Theo Carson	Episode: "El Diablo"
2019	Love Takes Flight	Charlie Allen	TV movie (Hallmark Hall of Fame)
2019–2020	Almost Family	Nick Cameron	5 episodes
2021	Our Kind of People	Jack Harmon	3 episodes
2021–2022	For All Mankind	Sam Cleveland	Seasons 2–3, 4 episodes
2021–2023	Power Book II: Ghost	Kevin Whitman	11 episodes
2023–present	Switch	Himself	Host
2024	Eric	Costello	Miniseries
