= Joe Chappelle =

American film director

- Born: Joseph Chappelle; 1961 (age 64–65); New Jersey, U.S.
- Occupations: Director, producer, writer
- Years active: 1993–present

Joseph Chappelle (born 1961) is an American screenwriter, producer, and director of film and television. He is perhaps best known for his work on the critically acclaimed HBO series The Wire, where he directed six episodes and served as co-executive producer for three seasons. In 2018, his episode "Middle Ground" was named the 6th Best TV Episode of the Century by pop culture website The Ringer. He has also produced and directed several other popular cable television programs, including CSI: Miami, Fringe and Chicago Fire.

Chappelle wrote and directed the political thriller An Acceptable Loss, starring Tika Sumpter and Jamie Lee Curtis, which was released by IFC Films in January 2019.

== Career ==
Chappelle was born in New Jersey. He graduated from Northwestern University with a Master of Fine Arts in Film and worked in Chicago's advertising community before working in film and television.

=== 1990s ===
Chappelle began his career with the independently produced film Thieves Quartet in 1994. He wrote and directed the feature. He went on to direct the horror sequel Halloween: The Curse of Michael Myers (1995) and shot additional scenes for Hellraiser: Bloodline (1996), replacing Kevin Yagher due to his fallout with the studio over creative differences. He directed the thriller Phantoms in 1998, based on the Dean Koontz novel of the same name.

=== 2000s ===
Chappelle directed the film Takedown in 2000. Also in 2000 Chappelle made his television debut with the feature Dark Prince: The True Story of Dracula.

In 2001, Chappelle became a director for the first season of espionage drama The Agency. Chappelle directed the episodes ""Viva Fidel", "God's Work" and "The Year of Living Dangerously". Chappelle did not return to work on the series' second season.

Later, in 2001, he became a director for the short-lived werewolf drama Wolf Lake. He directed the first season episodes "Soup to Nuts" and "Legend of Lost Lenore".

In 2002, Chappelle directed the second season premiere "Emergence" for the series Witchblade. He also directed the direct-to-video thriller sequel The Skulls II in 2002.

In 2002, Chappelle became a director for three new series; the 2002 reimagining of The Twilight Zone, HBO crime drama The Wire and the procedural spin-off CSI: Miami. He helmed The Twilight Zone episodes "Upgrade" and "To Protect and Serve". Chappelle remained involved with The Wire as a co-executive producer and with CSI: Miami as a producer throughout the 2000s.

In 2005, Chappelle served as a consultant and director for new CBS drama CSI: NY. The series was the second spin-off from CSI: Crime Scene Investigation. Chappelle directed the first season episode "Supply and Demand".

==== The Wire ====
Chappelle joined the crew of the HBO crime drama The Wire as a director for the first season in 2002. The Wire was created by David Simon and examines the city of Baltimore one faltering institution at a time. Chappelle directed the first season episode "One Arrest".

Chappelle returned to The Wire as co-executive producer, episodic director and second unit director for the third season in 2004. Chappelle directed the season's penultimate episode "Middle Ground". "Middle Ground" received the show's only Emmy Award nomination, for writers Simon and George Pelecanos in the category Outstanding Writing for a Drama Series. Simon credits Chappelle with choosing the music for the season three closing montage; Solomon Burke's cover of Van Morrison's "Fast Train" which appeared in the season finale "Mission Accomplished".

Chappelle returned as a co-executive producer, episodic director and second unit director for the fourth season of The Wire in 2006. He directed the season premiere "Boys of Summer" and the penultimate episode "That's Got His Own".

Chappelle returned as a co-executive producer and director for the fifth and final season of The Wire in 2008. Chappelle directed the season premiere "More with Less" and the penultimate episode "Late Editions". The series ended after five seasons. Chappelle and Ernest Dickerson were the series most prolific directors having helmed six episodes each. Chappelle and the other senior producers were nominated for a BAFTA Award for Best International Series at the 2009 ceremony for their work on the fifth season.

==== CSI: Miami ====
Chappelle directed the pilot episode "Golden Parachute" for the CBS crime drama CSI: Miami. The series was a spin-off from the successful procedural CSI: Crime Scene Investigation. Chappelle became a producer and director for the first season once the series was picked up. Chappelle directed a further four episodes for the first season; "Losing Face", "Evidence of Things Unseen", "Double Cap" and the season finale "Body Count".

Chappelle remained a producer and director for the second season of CSI: Miami in 2003. He directed a further six episodes; "Dead Zone", "Hurricane Anthony", "Big Brother", "Slow Burn", "Not Landing" and the season finale "Innocent".

While working on the third season of The Wire Chappelle reduced his involvement with CSI: Miami. He was no longer a producer but remained an episodic director for the third season in 2005. He directed the episodes "Recoil" and "10-7".

Chappelle did not work on the fourth season of CSI: Miami as he was working on the fourth season of The Wire. He returned as a consulting producer and director for the fifth season in fall 2006. He directed the season premiere "Rio" and the episodes "Curse of the Coffin", "Come As You Are" and "Throwing Heat". Chappelle again scaled back his involvement for the sixth season in fall 2007; he returned to being an episodic director only. He directed the episodes "Stand Your Ground" and "All In".

Chappelle returned to CSI: Miami as a consulting producer and director for the seventh season in fall 2008. He directed a further six episodes for the season; the premiere "Resurrection", "Wrecking Crew", "Power Trip", "Smoke Gets in Your CSI's", "Flight Risk" and the finale "Seeing Red".

Chappelle left the CSI: Miami production staff to work on the series Fringe in 2009. Chappelle continued to work as an episodic director for CSI: Miami while working on Fringe. He helmed the eighth season finale "All Fall Down" in 2010.

==== Fringe ====
In fall 2009, Chappelle joined the crew of the science-fiction/crime drama Fringe as a co-executive producer and director for the second and third season. Afterwards, in its fourth season, Chappelle served as an executive producer. The series follows a team of FBI agents and scientists investigating Fringe phenomena.

==== Chicago Fire ====
In winter 2012–2013, Chappelle joined the crew of the crime drama Chicago Fire as executive producer, and in five episodes as director.

==== An Acceptable Loss ====
In May 2017, Chappelle left Chicago Fire to begin production on his independent film An Acceptable Loss (formerly The Pages). The film, a political thriller starring Tika Sumpter and Jamie Lee Curtis, marked Chappelle's return to feature filmmaking after over 15 years of working in television.

An Acceptable Loss was acquired by IFC Films in September 2018 with plans for a January 2019 theatrical release.

== Personal life ==
Chappelle grew up in northern New Jersey.

== Filmography ==
=== Television ===
==== Production staff ====
Year	Show	Role	Season
2025	Smoke	co-executive producer	
2019	Godfather of Harlem	co-executive producer	"The Nitty Gritty"
2012-2017	Chicago Fire	co-executive producer	Seasons 1, 2, 3, 4, 5, 6, 7
2009-2011	Fringe	co-executive producer (seasons 2 & 3), executive producer (season 3–season 4)	Seasons 2, 3, 4
2008	Fringe	co-executive producer (seasons 2 & 3), executive producer (season 3–season 4)	Seasons 2, 3, 4
2008	The Wire	co-executive producer	Season 5
2007-2008	CSI: Miami	consulting producer	Season 5, 6
2006	CSI: Miami	consulting producer	Season 5, 6
2006	The Wire	co-executive producer	Season 4
2005	CSI: NY	consultant	Season 1
2004	The Wire	co-executive producer	Season 3
2004	CSI: Miami	producer	Season 2
2003	CSI: Miami	producer	Season 2
2003	CSI: Miami	producer	Season 1

==== Director ====
Year	Show	Season	Episode title	Episode	Notes
2025	Tulsa King	3	"Bubbles"	6	
2025	Tulsa King	3	"On the Rocks"	5	
2025	Smoke	1	"Mirror Mirror"	9	
2025	Smoke	1	"Whitewashed Tombs"	7	
2025	Smoke	1	"Strawberry"	5	
2025	Smoke	1	"Weird Milk"	3	
2025	Smoke	1	"Your Happy Makes Me Sad"	2	
2023	Godfather of Harlem	3	"Our Shining Black People"	10	
2023	Godfather of Harlem	3	"All Roads Lead to Malcolm"	7	
2023	Godfather of Harlem	3	"The Negro in White America"	1	
2022	Black Bird	1	"You Promised"	6	
2022	Black Bird	1	"The Place I Lie"	5	
2021	Godfather of Harlem	2	"The Hate That Hate Produced"	10	
2021	Godfather of Harlem	2	"Ten Harlems"	8	
2021	Godfather of Harlem	2	The Geechee"	4	
2021	Godfather of Harlem	2	"The French Connection"	1	
2020	neXt	1	"file #8"	8	
2020	Manifest	2	"Call Sign"	28	
2020	Manifest	2	"Fasten Your Seatbelts"	17	
2019	Godfather of Harlem	1	"The Nitty Gritty"	2	
2019	Godfather of Harlem	1	"Our Day Will Come"	3	
2019	Chicago Fire	7	"The White Whale"	21	
2018	Chicago Fire	6	"The Unrivaled Standard"	21	
2018	Chicago Fire	6	"Looking for a Lifeline"	14	
2018	Chicago Fire	6	"A Man's Legacy"	7	
2017	Chicago Fire	5	"Take a Knee"	18	
2017	Chicago Fire	5	"Deathtrap"	15	
2017	Chicago Fire	5	"Purgatory"	14	
2016	Chicago Fire	5	"One Hundred"	8	
2016	Chicago Fire	5	"Scorched Earth"	3	
2016	Chicago Fire	5	"The Hose or the Animal	1	
2016	Chicago Fire	4	"Kind of Crazy Idea"	21	
2016	Chicago Fire	4	"On the Warpath"	18	
2016	Chicago Fire	4	"The Sky Is Falling	13	
2015	Chicago Fire	4	"Short and Fat"	9	
2015	Chicago Fire	4	"Regarding This Wedding"	5	
2015	Chicago Fire	4	"Let It Burn"	1	
2015	Chicago Fire	3	"We Called Her Jellybean"	21	
2015	Chicago Fire	3	"I Am the Apocalypse"	19	
2015	Chicago Fire	3	"Headlong Toward Disaster"	15	
2015	Chicago Fire	3	"Ambush Predator"	12	
2014	Chicago Fire	3	"The Nuclear Option"	5	
2014	Chicago Fire	3	"Always"	1	
2014	Chicago Fire	2	"A Dark Day"	20	
2014	Chicago P.D.	1	"Wrong Side of the Bars"	2	
2013	Chicago Fire	2	"Rhymes with Shout"	8	
2013	Chicago Fire	2	"Defcon 1"	3	
2013	Chicago Fire	2	"A Problem House"	1	
2013	Chicago Fire	1	"Let Her Go"	23	
2013	Chicago Fire	1	"Better to Lie"	17	
2013	Chicago Fire	1	"Nazdarovya!"	15	
2012	Chicago Fire	1	"Rear View Mirror"	6	
2012	Chicago Fire	1	"Professional Courtesy"	3	
2012	Fringe	4	"Brave New World (Part 2)"	22	
2012	Fringe	4	"Brave New World (Part 1)"	21	
2012	Fringe	4	"Letters of Transit"	19	
2012	Fringe	4	"A Better Human Being"	13	
2012	Fringe	4	"Enemy of My Enemy"	9	
2011	Fringe	4	"Subject 9"	4	
2011	Fringe	4	"Neither Here Nor There"	1	
2011	Fringe	3	"The Day We Died"	22	
2011	Fringe	3	"Lysergic Acid Diethylamide"	19	
2010	Fringe	3	"Marionette"	9	
2010	Fringe	3	"6955 kHz"	6	
2010	Fringe	3	"Olivia"	1	
2010	CSI: Miami	8	"All Fall Down"	24	
2010	Fringe	2	"Northwest Passage"	21	
2010	Fringe	2	"Johari Window"	12	
2009	Fringe	2	"Of Human Action"	7	
2009	Fringe	2	"Momentum Deferred"	4	
2009	CSI: Miami	7	"Seeing Red"	25	
2009	CSI: Miami	7	"Flight Risk"	18	
2009	CSI: Miami	7	"Smoke Gets in Your CSI's"	14	
2008	CSI: Miami	7	"Power Trip"	9	
2008	CSI: Miami	7	"Wrecking Crew"	6	
2008	CSI: Miami	7	"Resurrection"	1	
2008	The Wire	5	"Late Editions"	9	
2008	The Wire	5	"More with Less"	1	
2008	CSI: Miami	6	"All In"	16	
2007	CSI: Miami	6	"Stand Your Ground"	9	
2007	CSI: Miami	5	"Throwing Heat"	13	
2006	CSI: Miami	5	"Come as You Are"	10	
2006	CSI: Miami	5	"Curse of the Coffin"	6	
2006	CSI: Miami	5	"Rio"	1	
2006	The Wire	4	"That's Got His Own"	12	
2006	The Wire	4	"Boys of Summer"	1	
2005	CSI: NY	1	"Supply & Demand"	20	
2005	CSI: Miami	3	"10-7"	24	
2005	CSI: Miami	3	"Recoil"	21	
2004	The Wire	3	"Middle Ground"	11	
2004	CSI: Miami	2	"Innocent"	24	
2004	CSI: Miami	2	"Not Landing"	21	
2004	CSI: Miami	2	"Slow Burn"	14	
2003	CSI: Miami	2	"Big Brother"	8	
2003	CSI: Miami	2	"Hurricane Anthony"	6	
2003	CSI: Miami	2	"Dead Zone"	2	
2003	CSI: Miami	1	"Body Count"	24	
2003	CSI: Miami	1	"Double Cap"	19	
2003	CSI: Miami	1	"Evidence of Things Unseen"	16	
2002	The Twilight Zone	1	"To Protect and Serve"	15	
2002	The Twilight Zone	1	"Upgrade"	14	
2002	CSI: Miami	1	"Losing Face"	2	
2002	CSI: Miami	1	"Golden Parachute"	1	
2002	The Wire	1	"One Arrest"	7	
2002	Witchblade	2	"Emergence"	1	
2002	Wolf Lake	1	"Legend of Lost Lenore"	8	
2001	Wolf Lake	1	"Soup to Nuts"	3	
2001	The Agency	1	"The Year of Living Dangerously"	3	
2001	The Agency	1	"God's Work"	2	
2001	The Agency	1	"Viva Fidel"	1	
2000	Dark Prince: The True Story of Dracula				Television feature

=== Film ===
- Thieves Quartet (1994)
- Halloween: The Curse of Michael Myers (1995)
- Hellraiser: Bloodline (1996) (Additional photography, uncredited)
- Phantoms (1998)
- Track Down (2000)
- The Skulls II (2002)
- An Acceptable Loss (2019)
