= Chicago Fire season 1 =

Chicago Fire
- Season 1
- Chicago Fire Season 1 DVD cover
- Showrunners: Matt Olmstead; Michael Brandt; Derek Haas
- No. of episodes: 24

Release
- Original network: NBC
- Original release: October 10, 2012 – May 22, 2013

Season chronology
- Next → Season 2

The first season of Chicago Fire, an American drama television series with executive producer Dick Wolf, and producers Derek Haas, Michael Brandt, and Matt Olmstead premiered on October 10, 2012, at Wednesday 10:00 p.m. EST, on the NBC television network. The season concluded after 24 episodes on May 22, 2013.

== Overview ==
The show follows the lives of the firefighters and paramedics working for the Chicago Fire Department at the firehouse of Engine 51, Truck 81, Squad 3, Ambulance 61, and Battalion 25.

== Cast and characters ==
=== Regular cast members ===
- Jesse Spencer as Lieutenant Matthew Casey-Truck Company 81
- Taylor Kinney as Lieutenant Kelly Severide-Squad Company 3
- Monica Raymund as Paramedic in Charge Gabriela Dawson-Ambulance Unit 61
- Lauren German as Paramedic Leslie Shay-Ambulance Unit 61
- Charlie Barnett as Firefighter Candidate Peter Mills-Truck Company 81
- Eamonn Walker as Battalion Chief Wallace Boden-Battalion 25
- David Eigenberg as Firefighter Christopher Hermann-Truck Company 81
- Teri Reeves as Doctor Hallie Thomas (Main, episodes 1–7; guest, episodes 20–22)

=== Recurring cast members ===
- Yuri Sardarov as Firefighter Brian "Otis" Zvonecek-Truck Company 81
- Joe Minoso as Firefighter/Chauffeur Joe Cruz-Truck Company 81
- Christian Stolte as Firefighter Randy "Mouch" McHolland-Truck Company 81
- Jon Seda as Detective Antonio Dawson
- Robyn Coffin as Cindy Hermann
- Jason Beghe as Detective Hank Voight
- Mo Gallini as Firefighter Jose Vargas-Truck Company 81/Squad Company 3
- William Smillie as Firefighter Kevin Hadley-Squad Company 3
- Randy Flagler as Firefighter Harold Capp-Squad Company 3
- Anthony Ferraris as Firefighter Tony Ferraris-Squad Company 3
- Chaon Cross as Heather Darden
- Jeff Lima as Leon Cruz
- Linda Powell as Ingrid Mills
- Alexandra Metz as Elise Mills
- Shiri Appleby as Clarice Carthage
- Treat Williams as Benny Severide
- Nicole Forester as Christie Casey Jordan
- Kathleen Quinlan as Nancy Casey
- Cody Sullivan as Ernie
- Shane McRae as Lieutenant Eric Whaley

=== Guest stars ===
- Corey Sorenson as Firefighter Andy Darden-Truck 81
- Melissa Sagemiller as Detective Jules Wilhite
- LaRoyce Hawkins as Officer Kevin Atwater

=== Special guest ===
- Rahm Emanuel as himself (Mayor of Chicago)

== Episodes ==
No. overall	No. in season	Title	Directed by	Written by	Original release date	Prod. code	U.S. viewers (millions)
1	1	"Pilot"	Jeffrey Nachmanoff	Michael Brandt & Derek Haas	October 10, 2012	101	6.61
The men and women of Firehouse 51 try to recuperate after the tragic loss of one of their own. One month later, the two Lieutenants at 51, Matthew Casey and Kelly Severide, are still at odds with each other over Andy Darden's death. They are forced to settle their differences when one of their colleagues, Christopher Herrmann, is at risk of losing his life. Paramedic Gabriela Dawson is facing disciplinary action after trying to save a girl by doing a risky procedure in the field. Peter Mills reports to Firehouse 51 for his first day of duty as a Firefighter/EMT Candidate. Casey tries to sort out his relationship with his fiancée, Hallie.
2	2	"Mon Amour"	Tom DiCillo	Michael Brandt & Derek Haas	October 17, 2012	102	5.85
Severide struggles with an ongoing shoulder injury as he tries to save a construction worker in a collapsed building. The men get a call to an apartment basement fire and mediate between an elderly tenant and his angry landlady. Still consumed with guilt over Darden's death, Severide finds out that Darden's widow Heather also blames him for the tragedy. The team rescues two teens trapped in a car. Casey and Hallie have more problems in their shaky relationship, while Otis tries to solve the mystery behind Truck 81's goat mascot. At the end of his shift, Severide visits the widow of the construction worker who died in the rubble to relay a special message.
3	3	"Professional Courtesy"	Joe Chappelle	Matt Olmstead	October 24, 2012	103	6.42
Casey is forced to make a difficult decision about whether or not he wants to report CPD Detective Voight's son for DUI. Severide finally makes an appointment to see the doctor about his injured arm, which turns out to be a fractured vertebra. Peter Mills finds that splitting his time between his mom and her restaurant and his own job is difficult. This episode is included on the Chicago P.D. Season 1 DVD set.
4	4	"One Minute"	Gloria Muzio	Andrea Newman	October 31, 2012	104	5.62
Chief Boden is accused of leaving a homeless man to die in a warehouse fire after ordering his men to evacuate the scene, creating negative press and bad feelings within the department. Meanwhile, Lieutenant Severide helps an elderly woman facing some neighborhood problems. Detective Voight ramps up his intimidation tactics aimed at Casey in an attempt to discourage him from testifying against his son. Shay is forced to revisit her heartbreak over her ex-girlfriend Clarice, when she finds herself face-to-face with the ex and her husband during a call. Herrmann's temper flares during a rescue call at a Halloween block party.
5	5	"Hanging On"	Jean de Segonzac	Marc Dube	November 7, 2012	105	7.03
Casey fights back against Detective Voight and ends up dealing with the repercussions, Dawson faces disciplinary action due to on the job conduct, and Severide's arm fails during a rescue on a roof.
6	6	"Rear View Mirror"	Joe Chappelle	Thania St. John	November 14, 2012	106	5.77
Casey is distracted by his issues with Detective Voight---especially after he and Hallie are set up for a trumped-up drug trafficking arrest---which worries Chief Boden and Dawson. Boden again notices a teenager who has an unusual interest in a large apartment fire. Dawson prepares for her disciplinary hearing and is pleasantly surprised when Mouch brings in a special witness to testify on her behalf. Dawson's brother, Antonio, a cop in Voight's precinct, arranges a sting to stop Voight after a young man Casey rescued in the apartment fire comes forward to help.
7	7	"Two Families"	Michael Slovis	Michael Brandt & Derek Haas	November 21, 2012	107	5.55
Everyone in the firehouse is ordered to take a drug test after a call to a daycare center exposes them to a makeshift meth lab, and Severide stalls, not wanting the painkillers he takes for his injury to be discovered. Boden is furious when he finds out his firefighters were caught in the middle of a gang turf war while out on a call. Firehouse 51's customary Thanksgiving dinner is interrupted twice, by a cooking mishap involving an exploded burnt turkey, and then a highway multi-vehicle pile up. Casey delivers a baby out in the middle of the pile up, prompting him to talk to Hallie about their future. The firehouse gets a teenage visitor and Boden and Herrman have their doubts. Otis starts a podcast.
8	8	"Leaving the Station"	Constantine Makris	Bryan Oh	December 5, 2012	108	7.21
Mills is particularly affected after discovering the dismembered body of a young girl inside a train tunnel and questions his future as a firefighter. 51 hosts some visiting firefighters from Toronto, Canada, bringing out a side of Mouch that his colleagues have never seen. Dawson and Shay save a 6-year-old girl whose mother is abusing her but their confrontation nearly ends in a tragedy. Meanwhile, Severide aggravates his injury while rescuing a victim suffering from low blood sugar, Casey tends to some personal business and Shay sends Clarice, her married and pregnant ex-girlfriend, back home to her husband.
9	9	"It Ain't Easy"	Tom DiCillo	Hilly Hicks, Jr.	December 12, 2012	109	4.87
After his lungs are damaged in an auto machine shop fire, Jose Vargas is forced to go on disability and leave his life as a firefighter behind - a task he finds incredibly difficult. Chief Boden tries to help a suspected teenage firebug. Also, Severide receives an enticing invitation from Renee, a woman who he saved from a car crash incident involving live electrical wires. Meanwhile, Cruz tries to save his younger brother Leon from the gang he is involved with. Casey and Severide try to stop Vargas from a desperate act.
10	10	"Merry Christmas, Etc."	Steve Shill	Michael Gilvary	December 19, 2012	110	6.75
After putting out a kitchen fire in an upscale townhouse, Casey, Herrmann, Mouch, Cruz, Otis and Mills find themselves accused of stealing a $50,000 diamond necklace from the home, which sparks an internal investigation led by Casey's nemesis from his academy days. Cruz's brother Leon is caught in the middle of an escalating gang war, leaving Cruz to make a desperate choice to save him. Meanwhile, Dawson invites Casey to her cousin's fancy Christmas party, and a frustrated Shay has reached her limit with Severide. Dawson and Shay's lives are left in jeopardy as they're involved in an ambulance crash.
11	11	"God Has Spoken"	Daniel Sackheim	Andrea Newman & Marc Dube	January 2, 2013	111	8.54
Eaten up by his guilt over Flaco's death in the fire, Cruz goes to Casey to confess. While Shay recovers from a head injury sustained in the ambulance crash, Severide asks Dawson for her help in dealing with his own injury. Casey is caught in the middle of a family conflict between his mother, Nancy---imprisoned for killing his abusive father but now facing possible parole---and his sister, Christie, who rejects their mother over it. Elsewhere, Herrmann finds a business deal hard to stomach. Meanwhile, things get spicy between Dawson and Mills.
12	12	"Under the Knife"	Alex Chapple	Matt Olmstead & Ryan Rege Harris	January 9, 2013	112	8.04
Severide finally addresses Chief Boden about his injury and makes some important personal decisions about his future, one of which involves Renee. Meanwhile, Casey struggles with family matters after Nancy asks him to appear at her parole hearing. Dawson takes matters into her own hands when she discovers a young girl who is the sole survivor at the scene of a rescue call.
13	13	"Warm and Dead"	Alik Sakharov	Michael Brandt & Derek Haas	January 30, 2013	113	7.31
A troubled Chief Boden goes to the police when a man dies in a hardware store fire set by Ernie, the troubled teenage firebug he's been trying to help, and his Uncle Ray. Meanwhile, Severide reaches out to his father after deciding a radical new surgery could require shorter recovery time while he has second thoughts about moving to Madrid to be with Renee. Elsewhere, Otis finds camaraderie when he fills in for a few shifts at the slowest firehouse in the city, and makes a decision of his own, while Dawson and Shay find themselves in a bad predicament during a call to a tenement apartment.
14	14	"A Little Taste"	Arthur W. Forney	Matt Olmstead & Hilly Hicks, Jr.	February 6, 2013	114	6.60
Severide returns to the firehouse and discovers he has an only too-familiar past with Eric Whaley, the Lieutenant who was brought into the firehouse to help during Kelly's absence---Whaley's sister is Severide's former fiancee. Dawson lets Shay in on her secret. Newly-paroled Nancy Casey moves in with her son, causing further issues between Casey and his sister. Meanwhile, a bad batch of heroin on the streets has Boden and the team scrambling while Dawson's detective brother Antonio is determined to stop it no matter what cost. Clarice gives birth to a baby boy, and Shay and Clarice find they have a new problem to overcome.
15	15	"Nazdarovya!"	Joe Chappelle	Andrea Newman	February 13, 2013	115	6.65
Dawson attempts to help her brother Antonio unravel the details of his drugs-and-gang investigation, and goes behind his back in turning to an unlikely source for assistance---which could impact her friendship with Casey. Casey and Nancy struggle with their new relationship. Having learned the truth about Severide's breakup with his sister Renee, Eric Whaley convinces Severide to try to find her. Herrmann and Otis learn some hard truths about their "silent partner" in the bar. Casey and Christie struggle over their mother, leading Casey to confront Nancy about his father's death.
16	16	"Viral"	Michael Brandt	Michael Gilvary	February 20, 2013	116	6.50
The anguish that haunts Cruz over his previous actions boils over, as he puts himself and his fellow firefighters in jeopardy. Casey and his sister Christie try to solve their issues with Nancy and each other. Meanwhile, Severide confronts Renee Whaley---who's now working in a strip club. The squad gains new perspective after assisting the bomb squad on an extremely dangerous call. Shay's attempt to prove herself a good mother to Clarice's baby is compromised when a homeless man hits her with a possibly-tainted needle.
17	17	"Better to Lie"	Joe Chappelle	Matt Olmstead & Ryan Rege Harris	February 27, 2013	117	6.62
Old emotional wounds are opened when Lieutenant Severide's father Benny comes to town and clashes with Chief Boden over the death of their former colleague Henry Mills. Peter Mills talks a distraught driver who caused an accident out of suicide. Shay's breakup with Clarice doesn't stop her from wanting a child of her own. Herrmann, Otis and Dawson get to the bottom of a mystery about their bar. At a fireman's charity ball, Dawson and Mills announce themselves as a couple, while Casey attends with Andy Darden's widow Heather as his date for the evening. Boden and Benny Severide argue outside the ballroom over Henry Mills's death---unaware that Dawson happens to be nearby and overhears that Boden and Henry's wife had an affair that prompted Henry's reckless action at the fire that killed him.
18	18	"Fireworks"	Karen Gaviola	Tim Talbott	March 20, 2013	118	6.39
With tensions still running high between Chief Boden and Benny Severide, things boil over when Mills confronts Benny about the fire that killed his father---and punches Benny after Benny insults him. Meanwhile, Severide, Casey and Benny uncover the truth behind two mysterious diner fires that only seem to be union intimidation tactics at first. Shay takes a new direction with her plan to have a baby. Heather Darden surprises Casey by inviting herself to make him dinner and share a movie with him for an evening.
19	19	"A Coffin That Small"	Darnell Martin	Story by : Steve Chickerotis; Teleplay by : Michael Brandt & Derek Haas	March 27, 2013	119	6.85
Tragedy strikes when a rescue attempt at a tenement building proves unsuccessful, leaving the men and women of firehouse 51 affected by the loss of the victim. Severide's decision to put Mills on the fast track to move from Truck to Squad doesn’t sit well with some of the others. Tension arises between Severide and Casey when Severide thinks Heather slept with him---unaware that Casey rejected the idea out of respect for Andy's memory. Shay and Dawson are forced to deal with a junkie's crazy behavior while on a call. Shay considers a different way to have a family, involving Severide. Meanwhile, the team draws the ire of local drug dealers who threaten the peace and safety of the neighborhood and firehouse---and shoot at the firehouse. A fireman's sparsely-attended funeral prompts Herrmann to try reconnecting with his own family.
20	20	"Ambition"	Arthur W. Forney	Andrea Newman & Michael Gilvary	April 3, 2013	120	6.37
Mills finds himself the target of resentment from some colleagues when Severide supports his desire to join Squad. Mills also thinks Casey's resentment ties to his relationship with Dawson. Tara, a paramedic candidate, joins Dawson and Shay on the job for a few shifts. Meanwhile, Shay comes to the aid of Cindy Herrmann, who suffers from pregnancy complications while her husband Christopher is out of town. Elsewhere, Dawson and Casey draw closer as the grand opening of Molly's draws near. Casey is surprised by former fiancee Hallie.
21	21	"Retaliation Hit"	Jean de Segonzac	Matt Olmstead & Hilly Hicks, Jr.	May 1, 2013	121	6.35
Detective Voight returns, looking to collect on the favor that Dawson owes him for helping her brother, Antonio. Tara accuses Severide of sexual harassment. Meanwhile, Casey falls back into old patterns in his personal life, reuniting with Hallie---and facing corrupt detective Voight's release from prison. Dawson, Herrmann and Otis become the proud owners of a real neighborhood bar as Molly's prepares for its grand opening.
22	22	"Leaders Lead"	Michael Slovis	Story by : Dick Wolf & Matt Olmstead; Teleplay by : Michael Brandt & Derek Haas	May 8, 2013	122	6.89
A frustrated Severide discovers Tara once forced an advertising executive---now working as a copy service manager---out of his high-powered career on a trumped up harassment charge. Mills and Dawson face personal challenges involving a secret about Mills's mother---Dawson finally reveals what she knows about his mother, his father, and Boden. After Severide confronts Tara with her old deception, Tara resigns her job and leaves town. Casey and Hallie continue happily reunited until a fire at the medical clinic where she now works erupts. Meanwhile, the squad is called to the scene of a harrowing apartment building collapse.
23	23	"Let Her Go"	Joe Chappelle	Story by : Dick Wolf & Matt Olmstead; Teleplay by : Michael Brandt & Derek Haas	May 15, 2013	123	6.90
Hallie's unexpected death in the clinic fire forces Casey to team up with the police Intelligence Unit, now run by Voight, who doesn’t appear to have changed his crooked ways after his stint in prison. Shay’s excitement at the prospect of becoming a parent grows, while Mills and Dawson face some personal challenges. Casey, Antonio, and Voight discover and chase the arsonist who set the fire that killed Hallie onto a Chicago elevated rapid transit train. Meanwhile, the house comes together to support the opening of Molly’s. This episode serves as the backdoor pilot for Chicago P.D.
24	24	"A Hell of a Ride"	Alex Chapple	Andrea Newman & Michael Gilvary	May 22, 2013	124	6.13
When a call comes in from the Cook County jail, the squad steps into a volatile predicament and are tasked with trying to defuse an escalating situation. Shay remains hopeful about her baby dreams and Hermann’s wife Cindy goes into labor with their fifth child. Meanwhile, Mills and Dawson face key decisions in their personal lives while Mills faces one involving his career. Mouch has a happy first in-person meeting with his months-long online Japanese love. Casey can finally grieve over Hallie---and receives unexpected private comfort.

== Production ==
The series pilot, co-written by creators Michael Brandt and Derek Haas, was filmed in Chicago and, according to an NBC representative, the series will continue to be filmed there. Mayor of Chicago Rahm Emanuel made an appearance in the series' pilot episode. Emanuel stated: "It's easier being mayor than playing mayor. I told them I'd do it under one condition: the TV show is making an investment to the Firefighters' Widows and Orphans Fund".

The network placed an order for the series in May 2012. After receiving an additional script order in October, Chicago Fire was picked up for a full season on November 8, 2012. On January 29, 2013, Chicago Fire had its episode total increased from 22 to 23. One week later, on February 6, 2013, Chicago Fire received one more episode, giving it a total of 24 episodes for season one.

The firehouse shown is Engine 18's quarters, located at 1360 S. Blue Island Ave. between 13th & Racine. Housed here is Engine 18, 2-2-1 (Deputy District Chief - 1st District), 4-5-7 (Paramedic Field Chief - EMS District 7), 6-4-16 (High-Rise Response Unit), and Ambulance 65.

== Spinoff ==
On March 27, 2013, NBC announced plans for a proposed spin-off of Chicago Fire. Nellie Andreeva of Deadline Hollywood reported they heard the spin-off would involve the Chicago Police Department, the spin-off series being created and produced by Dick Wolf, with Derek Haas, Michael Brant, and Matt Olmstead serving as executive producers. It premiered on January 8, 2014.

The show follows an Intelligence Unit and is filmed entirely in Chicago. The main cast includes Jason Beghe, Jon Seda, Sophia Bush, Jesse Lee Soffer, Patrick Flueger, Elias Koteas, Marina Squerciati, LaRoyce Hawkins, and Archie Kao.

A crossover between the two Chicago shows aired on April 29 and 30, 2014, depicting an explosion that brings the fire and police departments together.

== Home media ==
The DVD release of season one was released in Region 1 on September 10, 2013.

The Complete First Season
Set details			Special features
24 episodes; 1,026 minutes (Region 1); 5-disc set; 1.78:1 aspect ratio; Languages: English (Dolby Digital 5.1); Subtitles: English (Region 1)			Behind the Scenes; Otis' Podcasts
Release dates			Behind the Scenes; Otis' Podcasts
United States	United Kingdom	Australia	Behind the Scenes; Otis' Podcasts
September 10, 2013			Behind the Scenes; Otis' Podcasts
