= Chicago P.D. season 12 =

Chicago P.D.
- Season 12
- Chicago P.D. Season 12 DVD cover
- Showrunner: Gwen Sigan
- Starring: Jason Beghe; Marina Squerciati; Patrick John Flueger; LaRoyce Hawkins; Benjamin Levy Aguilar; Toya Turner; Amy Morton
- No. of episodes: 22

Release
- Original network: NBC
- Original release: September 25, 2024 – May 21, 2025

Season chronology
- ← Previous; Season 11 Next → Season 13

The twelfth season of the American police procedural television series Chicago P.D. was renewed in March 2024, along with its sister shows Chicago Fire and Chicago Med. and premiered on September 25, 2024, on NBC, for the 2024–25 television season.

== Cast and characters ==
=== Main ===
- Jason Beghe as Sergeant Henry "Hank" Voight
- Marina Squerciati as Officer/Detective Kim Burgess
- Patrick John Flueger as Officer Adam Ruzek
- LaRoyce Hawkins as Officer Kevin Atwater
- Benjamin Levy Aguilar as Officer Dante Torres
- Toya Turner as Officer Kiana Cook
- Amy Morton as Desk Sergeant Trudy Platt

=== Recurring ===
- Sara Bues as ASA Nina Chapman
- Ramona Edith Williams as Makayla Burgess
- Yara Martinez as Gloria Perez
- Jack Coleman as Disco Bob Ruzek
- Shawn Hatosy as Deputy Chief Charlie Reid

=== Crossover ===
- Christian Stolte as Lieutenant Randall "Mouch" McHolland

== Episodes ==
No. overall	No. in season	Title	Directed by	Written by	Original release date	Prod. code	U.S. viewers (millions)
222	1	"Ten Ninety-Nine"	Chad Saxton	Gwen Sigan	September 25, 2024	1201	4.31
A month has passed since Voight's near-death experience; the Intelligence unit is focused now on taking down a large drug trafficking ring in Chicago. Meanwhile, Ruzek is introduced to a new partner, Emily Martel, following Upton's departure. The episode ends with Ruzek and Martel getting caught in a crossfire with Martel getting shot and killed.
223	2	"Blood Bleeds Blue"	Victor Macias	Gavin Harris	October 2, 2024	1202	4.82
Ruzek and the Intelligence unit work together to track down a perpetrator responsible for the murder of Officer Emily Martel. Meanwhile, Ruzek partners up with rookie patrol officer Kiana Cook to assist with the case.
224	3	"Off Switch"	Takashi Doscher	Matthew Browne	October 9, 2024	1203	4.34
The Intelligence unit investigates an armed robbery of a store with the manager being the only survivor being the witness of the crime. Meanwhile, Atwater tries to balance work with his personal life when a forensic psychologist he met at a bar joins the case.
225	4	"The After"	Marc Roskin	Mellori Velasquez	October 16, 2024	1204	4.75
Voight and the Intelligence unit teams up with an ASA to track a serial killer who kidnaps and tortures their victims with a dangerous chemical. This case brings back painful memories for Voight as he continues to struggle with PTSD.
226	5	"Water and Honey"	Chad Saxton	Gwen Sigan	October 23, 2024	1205	4.77
The Intelligence unit offers assistance to Officer Cook on a case when which she and her partner disagree on an investigation all while dealing with a major rainstorm.
227	6	"Pawns"	John Hyams	Joe Halpin	November 6, 2024	1206	4.45
Burgess asks Voight and the Intelligence unit for assistance on a case when she is looking to get promoted as a detective.
228	7	"Contrition"	Gonzalo Amat	Gavin Harris	November 13, 2024	1207	4.34
Torres is horrified to discover that his past romance and CI, Gloria has resurfaced as a leader of a new drug cartel at the same time Cook is put undercover to gather evidence to take down the cartel.
229	8	"Penance"	Chad Saxton	Gwen Sigan	November 20, 2024	1208	4.36
After being made in the undercover operation to take down a cartel, Torres is forced to confess his sexual relationship with his former CI who is now the leader of the cartel. Meanwhile, Deputy Chief Reid keeps interrogating Voight and the Intelligence unit for information on the case which leads to him discovering Torres' secret forcing an ultimatum.
230	9	"Friends and Family"	Takashi Doscher	Tiffany Bratcher & Bridget Tyler	January 8, 2025	1209	4.73
Cook witnesses a traffic accident and tries to help the victim, a father who reveals that his family has been kidnapped and ransom money is demanded. Later on, the intelligence unit fails to come up with enough money for the ransom money, which forces Cook to ask her estranged mother for a loan.
231	10	"Zoe"	Lisa Robinson	Teleplay by : Gwen Sigan & Matthew Browne; Story by : Gwen Sigan & Gavin Harris	January 22, 2025	1210	4.86
Ruzek responds to a call of a welfare check only to discover a double homicide and a young child left alone in the house. Soon after, Ruzek discovers that the child's DNA doesn't match with any of the victims to get an ID leading to believe that she had been kidnapped. Meanwhile, Ruzek's father makes a surprise visit to reveal he had been diagnosed with Alzheimer's.
232	11	"In the Trenches: Part III"	Chad Saxton	Joe Halpin	January 29, 2025	1211	6.39
Voight and the Intelligence Unit continue to investigate the gas explosion at a high rise with the Chicago Fire Department, where a terrible secret is uncovered and it's revealed that someone who they thought was on their side might actually not be. Meanwhile, Platt recovers from her shooting at the hands of one of the offenders, while Ruzek and Stella Kidd continue searching for a way to be rescued from the underground subway car and root out the perpetrator hiding amongst them. Note: This episode concludes a crossover event that begins on Chicago Fire season 13 episode 11 and continues on Chicago Med season 10 episode 11.
233	12	"The Good Shepherd"	Brenna Malloy	Mellori Velasquez	February 5, 2025	1212	4.47
While on routine court calls, Torres and the Intelligence unit discover the body of young teen found beaten to death in a garage. Voight soon discovers that the teen had escaped a juvenile detention center where Torres has previously served time. As Torres volunteers to go undercover, he learns that the inmates are being used by the warden for sexual favors.
234	13	"Street Jesus"	John Polson	Rick Eid & Joe Halpin	February 19, 2025	1213	4.68
Atwater and the Intelligence unit investigate the murder of a young teen killed as an innocent bystander. Soon after, Atwater discovers after a second drive by shooting caught on surveillance and discovers that his friend and a former gang member turn entrepreneur might be the key witness to the first crime.
235	14	"Marie"	Carl Seaton	Teleplay by : Gavin Harris; Story by : Gwen Sigan & Gavin Harris	February 26, 2025	1214	4.60
Ruzek and the Intelligence unit continue to investigate and track down a serial killer who is wanted for 9 murders and the kidnapping of a little girl going by the name "Zoe." Meanwhile, Ruzek continues to deal with his dad's health deterioration.
236	15	"Greater Good"	Victor Macias	Gavin Harris & Gwen Sigan	March 5, 2025	1215	4.40
Voight and the Intelligence unit are thrown into Deputy Chief’s new initiative of reducing violence after learning a series of gang are trying to claim territory all over the city. Meanwhile, Voight asks for help to find evidence of wrongdoing try to take down Reid.
237	16	"Seen and Unseen"	Stephen Surjik	Gavin Harris & Gwen Sigan	March 26, 2025	1216	4.83
When a diner that Kim Burgess was recently frequented was shot at which resulted in the deaths of five people, then she must remember what led up to this mass shooting.
238	17	"Transference"	Chad Saxton	Matthew Browne	April 2, 2025	1217	4.66
The Intelligence unit investigates a shooting that has a connection to Atwater and his relationship with Val and her patient. Later on, Atwater soon discovers that Val allowed her patient to express feelings that turned to an obsession.
239	18	"Demons"	Paul McCrane	Gavin Harris	April 16, 2025	1218	4.44
Deputy chief Reid goes behind Voight's back and sends an injured Torres to find leads to a car suspected of transporting drugs around Chicago. Meanwhile, Voight is worried for Torres when he reveals that he has not slept for weeks. At the same time, Voight and ASA Chapman build a case with the team to take down Reid for protecting drug kingpin Jesus Otero.
240	19	"Name Image Likeness"	Keesha Sharp	Mellori Velasquez	April 23, 2025	1219	4.17
Cook recruits her first confidential informant while investigating a robbery that went wrong with 2 dead—a star college athlete is the primary person of interest. Meanwhile, Cook's persistent mother continues to reach out to make amends.
241	20	"Black Ice"	John Polson	Gwen Sigan & Tiffany Bratcher	May 7, 2025	1220	4.42
Ruzek tries to help a man off a bridge only to fall to his death. Ruzek soon discovers a big gash in the man’s stomach leading to the Intelligence unit to find out that the victim had been involved in a sex trafficking operation. Meanwhile, Ruzek continues to look after his dad.
242	21	"Open Casket"	Victor Macias	Gavin Harris	May 14, 2025	1221	4.29
Voight, Chapman and the Intelligence try to track down Otero and get him to flip to build a case against Chief Reid. Later on, the team gets made from the inside leading to Otero to be killed on Reid's order. Later on, Reid shows up to the precinct to arrest Torres for misconduct and to dismiss Burgess for aiding and obstructing an investigation and to disband the Intelligence unit.
243	22	"Vows"	Chad Saxton	Gwen Sigan	May 21, 2025	1222	4.75
Voight and the Intelligence are forced to work underground after being disbanded by Reid when he learns that Voight is close to finding hard evidence that will take him down. Meanwhile, Burgess and Ruzek contemplate postponing their wedding.

== Production ==
=== Casting ===
Following the departure of Tracy Spiridakos at the end of the previous season, it was announced on July 31, 2024, that Toya Turner was cast as Officer Kiana Cook. Turner's character made her first appearance in the second episode. On September 4, 2024, it was announced that Shawn Hatosy was cast in a recurring role as Deputy Chief Charlie Reid.

As with the previous season, all of the main cast (with the exception of Jason Beghe), missed at least one episode due to budget reasons, which was a condition of the show being renewed.

Turner's contract was not renewed after the end of the season, due to budget cuts, with her character making her final appearance in the season finale.

=== Crossover ===
In January 2025, the Chicago shows aired their first full crossover since 2019. The episodes, called "In the Trenches", were filmed in late 2024 and saw the casts of the three shows dealing with a gas explosion at a government building that also caused a subway car to be trapped underground. The episodes were described as a "three-hour action movie" by Anastasia Puglisi, Wolf Entertainment Executive Vice President and co-executive producer of the One Chicago series.

== Ratings ==
Viewership and ratings per episode of Chicago P.D. season 12
No.	Title	Air date	Rating (18–49)	Viewers (millions)	DVR (18–49)	DVR viewers (millions)	Total (18–49)	Total viewers (millions)	Ref.
1	"Ten Ninety-Nine"	September 25, 2024	0.3	4.31	—N/a	—N/a	—N/a	—N/a	
2	"Blood Bleeds Blue"	October 2, 2024	0.4	4.82	—N/a	—N/a	—N/a	—N/a	
3	"Off Switch"	October 9, 2024	0.3	4.34	—N/a	—N/a	—N/a	—N/a	
4	"The After"	October 16, 2024	0.4	4.75	0.3	2.35	0.6	7.09	
5	"Water and Honey"	October 23, 2024	0.4	4.77	0.3	2.38	0.6	7.15	
6	"Pawns"	November 6, 2024	0.4	4.45	0.3	2.50	0.7	6.95	
7	"Contrition"	November 13, 2024	0.3	4.34	0.3	2.51	0.6	6.85	
8	"Penance"	November 20, 2024	0.3	4.36	0.2	2.26	0.6	6.62	
9	"Friends and Family"	January 8, 2025	0.4	4.73	0.2	2.00	0.5	6.73	
10	"Zoe"	January 22, 2025	0.4	4.86	0.3	2.58	0.6	7.44	
11	"In the Trenches: Part III"	January 29, 2025	0.5	6.39	0.2	2.40	0.7	8.78	
12	"The Good Shepherd"	February 5, 2025	0.4	4.47	0.3	2.56	0.6	7.04	
13	"Street Jesus"	February 19, 2025	0.4	4.68	0.3	2.39	0.6	7.07	
14	"Marie"	February 26, 2025	0.4	4.60	0.2	2.34	0.6	6.94	
15	"Greater Good"	March 5, 2025	0.3	4.40	0.2	2.40	0.5	6.80	
16	"Seen and Unseen"	March 26, 2025	0.4	4.83	0.2	2.40	0.6	7.23	
17	"Transference"	April 2, 2025	0.3	4.66	—N/a	—N/a	—N/a	—N/a	
18	"Demons"	April 16, 2025	0.3	4.44	—N/a	—N/a	—N/a	—N/a	
19	"Name Image Likeness"	April 23, 2025	0.3	4.17	—N/a	—N/a	—N/a	—N/a	
20	"Bird Gets Worm"	May 7, 2025	0.3	4.42	—N/a	—N/a	—N/a	—N/a	
21	"Open Casket"	May 14, 2025	0.4	4.29	—N/a	—N/a	—N/a	—N/a	
22	"Vows"	May 21, 2025	0.4	4.75	—N/a	—N/a	—N/a	—N/a	
