= Chicago P.D. season 13 =

Chicago P.D.
- Season 13
- Promotional poster
- Showrunner: Gwen Sigan
- Starring: Jason Beghe; Marina Squerciati; Patrick John Flueger; LaRoyce Hawkins; Benjamin Levy Aguilar; Arienne Mandi; Amy Morton
- No. of episodes: 21

Release
- Original network: NBC
- Original release: October 1, 2025 – May 13, 2026

Season chronology
- ← Previous; Season 12 Next → Season 14

The thirteenth season of the American police procedural television series Chicago P.D. was commissioned on May 6, 2025. The season premiered on October 1, 2025 and concluded on May 13, 2026. The season consisted of 21 episodes.

== Cast and characters ==
=== Main ===
- Jason Beghe as Sergeant Henry "Hank" Voight
- Marina Squerciati as Detective Kim Burgess
- Patrick John Flueger as Officer Adam Ruzek
- LaRoyce Hawkins as Officer Kevin Atwater
- Benjamin Levy Aguilar as Officer Dante Torres
- Arienne Mandi as Officer Eva Imani
- Amy Morton as Desk Sergeant Trudy Platt

=== Recurring ===
- Joel Murray as Commander Mark Devlin
- Ramona Edith Williams as Makayla Ward Burgess
- Jack Coleman as Disco Bob Ruzek
- Barry Del Sherman as Raymond Bell
- Karen Obilom as Officer Tasha Fox

=== Special guest stars ===
- Jesse Lee Soffer as Jay Halstead
- Tracy Spiridakos as Hailey Upton

== Episodes ==
No. overall	No. in season	Title	Directed by	Written by	Original airdate	Prod. code	U.S. viewers (millions)
244	1	"Consequences"	Chad Saxton	Gwen Sigan	October 1, 2025	1301	4.39
With the Intelligence Unit disbanded, Voight, now a patrol sergeant, looks into trying to get the team back together when crime rate begins to spike in Chicago. Upon meeting undercover ATF agent Eva Imani, Voight realizes she might be the key to get the unit reinstated. Meanwhile, Burgess and Torres struggle adjusting to the loss of their badges.
245	2	"Open Wounds"	Jesse Lee Soffer	Edgar Castillo	October 8, 2025	1304	3.92
The reinstated Intelligence Unit work together with Torres to track down an abducted man who lives in his neighborhood. Meanwhile, Torres reconsiders his faith.
246	3	"Canaryville"	Marc Roskin	Mellori Velasquez	October 15, 2025	1303	4.22
The Intelligence Unit investigates a homicide where Burgess and Ruzek live. Things get complicated when Burgess and Ruzek are forced to investigate their neighbors.
247	4	"Root Cause"	Victor Macias	Gavin Harris	October 22, 2025	1302	4.42
Officer Eva Imani and the Intelligence Unit investigates the formerly wealthy Bell family when one of their members commits a series of brutal attacks on random strangers, brutally damaging their hands and then later apologizing for his actions. Meanwhile, Voight asks Platt for help after discovering someone left a photo of his father with an incriminating message on the windshield of his car.
248	5	"Miami"	Chad Saxton	Stephen Scaia	October 29, 2025	1305	4.28
Atwater reunites with Officer Tasha Fox, an old friend of his from the police academy, when a bombing rocks a downtown Chicago office building, leading to a manhunt to prevent the bomber from setting off any further explosions and killing more civilians. At the same time, Atwater deals with tension between him and Fox as she's transferring over to the Miami PD soon.
249	6	"Send Me"	Lisa Robinson	Teleplay by : Gwen Sigan; Story by : Gwen Sigan & Tiffany Bratcher	November 5, 2025	1306	3.99
While running an errand for Platt, Torres' car is hit by a police van that is transporting Odell Morgan, a convict accused of murdering his wife, who takes Torres hostage and demands he help clear his name. As Intelligence goes out hunting for the fugitive, they soon discover he may have been right about a frame-up and set out to uncover the truth.
250	7	"Impulse Control"	Chad Saxton	Matthew Browne	November 12, 2025	1307	4.14
When Voight's suspicions about Raymond Bell, the father of deceased violent murderer Gary Bell, begin to ring true when a male prostitute is found murdered with Gary's signature, the Intelligence Unit takes on the case in order to prove that Bell is just as murderous as his son, sending them down a dark and twisted trail of bloodshed. Meanwhile, Imani becomes emotionally attached to Bell's granddaughter Julie, which later leads to the case getting complicated for her, and Voight narrows in on his blackmailer after receiving another childhood photo.
251	8	"Born Screaming"	Paul McCrane	Gavin Harris	January 7, 2026	1308	N/A
After Imani breaks into Bell's house in an attempt to rescue Julie, things go horribly wrong, and Raymond escapes with his granddaughter. Intellingence race against the clock to take down Bell and save Julie before more lives are put at risk. Meanwhile, Voight discovers that Commander Devlin has been blackmailing him, leading to a tense confrontation.
252	9	"Heroes"	Stephen Surjik	Gavin Harris & Matthew Browne	January 14, 2026	1309	N/A
While working on a case, Platt is shocked to find out the next day the cop she was working with, Rob, took his own life. However Platt believes someone targeted Rob and staged his suicide.
253	10	"Faith"	Hanelle Culpepper	Mellori Velasquez	January 21, 2026	1310	N/A
Torres is pushed to his limits, as he and Intelligence dig deeper into the Morgan Case, where they discover that the death of Simone resulted from her witnessing a murder.
254	11	"On the Way"	Keesha Sharp	Stephen Scaia	January 28, 2026	1311	N/A
After witnessing a carjacking that took the life of a salesman, Atwater goes undercover in the world of street racing.
255	12	"Missing"	Chad Saxton	Gwen Sigan	February 4, 2026	1312	N/A
A long-term missing child case hits home for Imani, when Intelligence discover that the man who claimed to be the kidnapped son, is actually a con man, who took advantage of a grieving mother's deteriorated mental health to steal money.
256	13	"Reckoning, Part III"	Chad Saxton	Edgar Castillo	March 4, 2026	1314	6.12
In 2001, Hank Voight saves the life of Tommy Marr who was trapped when the apartment caught on fire. Now in present day, Tommy is targeting Voight, Pascal and Goodwin. Voight confesses to the Intelligent team saying that the apartment was due for inspection and told them to hold it off for two days, since he was doing an ongoing investigation. As a result, the apartment caught fire two days later. The CPD and CFD race against the clock to track down Marr before more people fall victim to the chemical attack he staged. Note: This episode concludes a crossover event that begins on Chicago Fire season 14 episode 13 and continues on Chicago Med season 11 episode 13.
257	14	"Meant to Be"	Victor Macias	Gavin Harris	March 11, 2026	1313	N/A
Burgess takes a rookie officer from college for her first mission on a drug case. During the gunfire, one of the officers is shot and taken to Med. When the officer later dies, Kim learns that the bullet was fired from Katie's gun.
258	15	"Live and Die By Your C.I."	Chris Grismer	Edgar Castillo	March 18, 2026	1315	N/A
After a routine mission goes wrong, Ruzek begins to grow suspicious when a DEA agent contacts him about a missing person.
259	16	"Restored"	Milena Govich	Teleplay by : Matthew Browne; Story by : William Angelico & Matthew Browne	April 1, 2026	1316	N/A
Dante takes Malik under his wing to do the right thing after he throws a molotov cocktail at a neighbor's fence. While Dante is getting extra paint from his car, Malik is shot and killed by an unknown driver. Dante learns through Malik's socials that he assaulted the wrong person, who wanted to take revenge.
260	17	"Partners"	Lisa Robinson	Gwen Sigan	April 8, 2026	1317	N/A
Voight witnesses an ATM being stolen in broad daylight. The owner has a tracker on it and when Voight follows it, he unexpectedly meets a criminal informant from his past. Intelligence dig deeper into the robbery, where Voight and Imani's partnership gets put to the test.
261	18	"The Wicked River"	John Hyams	Stephen Scaia	April 22, 2026	1318	N/A
Atwater and Fox are walking home from dinner when a person calls for them at a party where one of the guests is shot in a robbery gone wrong. Atwater later discovers that the person who called them over was actually the obsessive ex-boyfriend of the victim, who had staged the whole thing under his mother's intructions.
262	19	"Going Back"	Paul McCrane	Gavin Harris & D. Dona Le & Matthew Browne	April 29, 2026	1319	N/A
While combing through some memories, Ruzek sees something unusual on an old VHS tape. When he shows it to his father, he doesn't remember a thing, as his demntia is worsening. Adam looks through and notices Room 7 and the motel where an apparent murder occurred. When Adam goes to the motel, he notices the owner is secretly surveiling people from his security setup. Adam gets ambushed and wakes up in the hospital. As Ruzek slowly regains his memory, he remembers chasing after someone in a alley. Ruzek tried to climb over a fence but slipped and fell on his head, rendering him unconscious. Intelligence manages to track down the man, who explains what he witnessed that night in Room 7, and that he was the one who sent the tape over to Adam's father. After successfully closing the case, Adam gets informed that his dad is near death, so he rushes over to the hospital to say goodbye, promising to hold on to their father-son memories they had shared.
263	20	"The Lost Years"	Victor Macias	Gavin Harris & Gwen Sigan	May 6, 2026	1320	N/A
In search of her missing sister, Imani and Voight stumble across a woman's corpse that was found near the lake. Imani peruses the victims phone and is shocked when her sister Shari appears in a photo next to the victim. Now with the phone in possession, Imani races against the clock to track down her missing sister.
264	21	"Born or Made"	Chad Saxton	Gavin Harris & Gwen Sigan	May 13, 2026	1321	N/A
Imani risks her life and goes off book to apprehend her sister, who is a suspect in the case of the murder victim found by the lake. Later, after getting lured into a trap and nearly getting shot by her own sister, as well as the latter's suicide attempt after Voight brutally kills her captor, Imani meets with Voight, who reveals that her sister's DNA was found on her colleague's dead body, and the two are left to decide whether to bury the evidence or charge Imani's sister for murder.

== Production ==
=== Casting ===
Arienne Mandi joined the series as Officer Eva Imani, formerly an ATF agent who joins the newly reformed Intelligence in the season premiere. She replaced Toya Turner, whose character was written out after the Season 12 finale.

On October 21, 2025, it was announced that Patrick John Flueger was taking a leave of absence "to deal with a personal matter.” Flueger’s character is intended to return to the show at a later date.

Former cast members Jesse Lee Soffer and Tracy Spiridakos were announced to be returning for the 2026 crossover episodes in March 2026. Their characters had last appeared in Seasons 10 and 11 respectively.

=== Crossover ===
A new three part crososver between Chicago PD and its two sister shows Chicago Fire and Chicago Med was announced on January 21, 2026. The episodes will form the 13th episodes of the season for each show, and they aired on March 4, 2026.

== Ratings ==
Viewership and ratings per episode of Chicago P.D. season 13
No.	Title	Air date	Rating (18–49)	Viewers (millions)	DVR (18–49)	DVR viewers (millions)	Total (18–49)	Total viewers (millions)	Ref.
1	"Consequences"	October 1, 2025	0.3	4.39	0.2	2.23	0.5	6.62	
2	"Open Wounds"	October 8, 2025	0.3	3.92	0.2	2.08	0.4	6.00	
3	"Canaryville"	October 15, 2025	0.3	4.22	0.2	2.09	0.5	6.31	
4	"Root Cause"	October 22, 2025	0.3	4.42	0.1	1.93	0.4	6.34	
5	"Miami"	October 29, 2025	0.3	4.28	0.2	1.90	0.4	6.18	
6	"Send Me"	November 5, 2025	0.3	3.99	0.2	1.91	0.4	5.90	
7	"Impulse Control"	November 12, 2025	0.3	4.14	—N/a	—N/a	—N/a	—N/a	
