= Chicago P.D. season 5 =

Chicago P.D.
- Season 5
- Chicago P.D. Season 5 DVD cover
- Showrunner: Rick Eid
- No. of episodes: 22

Release
- Original network: NBC
- Original release: September 27, 2017 – May 9, 2018

Season chronology
- ← Previous; Season 4 Next → Season 6

The fifth season of Chicago P.D., an American police drama television series by executive producer Dick Wolf, premiered on September 27, 2017, and concluded on May 9, 2018. It contained 22 episodes, including the series' 100th. It is the final season featuring Elias Koteas as Alvin Olinsky.

== Cast ==
=== Regular ===
- Jason Beghe as Sergeant Henry "Hank" Voight
- Jon Seda as Detective Antonio Dawson
- Jesse Lee Soffer as Detective Jay Halstead
- Tracy Spiridakos as Detective Hailey Upton
- Patrick John Flueger as Officer Adam Ruzek
- Marina Squerciati as Officer Kim Burgess
- LaRoyce Hawkins as Officer Kevin Atwater
- Amy Morton as Desk Sergeant Trudy Platt
- Elias Koteas as Detective Alvin Olinsky

=== Recurring ===
- Mykelti Williamson as Lieutenant Denny Woods
- Esai Morales as Chief Lugo
- Chris Agos as Assistant State's Attorney Steve Kot
- Wendell Pierce as Alderman Ray Price
- Anabelle Acosta as Camila Vega
- John Pankow as Judge Tommy Wells
- Michael McGrady as Assistant State's Attorney James Osha

=== Crossover ===
- Jesse Spencer as Captain Matthew Casey
- Taylor Kinney as Lieutenant Kelly Severide
- Monica Raymund as Paramedic in Charge Gabriela Dawson
- Eamonn Walker as Chief Wallace Boden
- David Eigenberg as Firefighter Christopher Herrmann
- Christian Stolte as Firefighter Randy "Mouch" McHolland
- Kara Killmer as Paramedic Sylvie Brett
- Joe Minoso as Firefighter Joe Cruz
- Nick Gehlfuss as Dr. Will Halstead
- Yaya DaCosta as April Sexton
- Monica Barbaro as Assistant State's Attorney Anna Valdez
- Lorena Diaz as Nurse Doris

== Episodes ==
No. overall	No. in season	Title	Directed by	Written by	Original release date	Prod. code	U.S. viewers (millions)
85	1	"Reform"	Eriq La Salle	Rick Eid	September 27, 2017	501	6.11
Halstead, who has been partnered with new team member Hailey Upton, has to deal with Erin Lindsay's departure and the news that she will not return. Burgess returns from her leave and the Intelligence unit investigates an escalating gang war that winds up involving the accidental death of a young child, for which Halstead is blamed. Under pressure from his former partner-turned-independent auditor, Lieutenant Denny Woods, Voight seeks help from Antonio Dawson and after closing the case, later asks him to return to Intelligence full time.
86	2	"The Thing About Heroes"	Rohn Schmidt	John Dove	October 4, 2017	503	6.19
The Intelligence unit teams up with the FBI after a deadly bomb explodes during an annual street festival. The case turns personal for Burgess when an officer she helped train goes missing after the explosion and evidence linking him to the bomb and a terrorist group mounts. Desperate to prove her friend's innocence, Burgess goes against Voight and the investigation to dig deeper on her own and discovers her friend was running his own undercover operation on the terrorist group.
87	3	"Promise"	John Whitesell	Timothy J. Sexton	October 11, 2017	502	6.07
With Dawson back in Intelligence, he takes on a case that involves the brutal murder of a young Latina woman who is suspected to be a drug mule. Dawson later begins to hit roadblocks when he has trouble finding strong witnesses.
88	4	"Snitch"	Terry Miller	Story by : Rick Eid & Gavin Harris; Teleplay by : Rick Eid	October 18, 2017	504	5.79
The Intelligence unit investigates a series of murders that has a personal connection with Atwater as his younger brother might be involved. Meanwhile, Upton questions Ruzek's actions following an altercation with a suspect. Also, Voight suspects that Dawson might be tipping off to the wrong people as his eye witnesses to the murders turn up dead.
89	5	"Home"	Eriq La Salle	Sharon Lee Watson	October 25, 2017	505	6.16
When Intelligence busts a meth lab run by gang leader Marshall Carter, they uncover a re-homing scam in which children adopted from foreign countries are abandoned, then sold online. Meanwhile, Atwater struggles with the difficult decision about whether to move his siblings Jordan and Vinessa to a safer environment outside of Chicago.
90	6	"Fallen"	Nick Gomez	Gavin Harris	November 8, 2017	506	5.16
A picture perfect family is shot dead in their home and the team goes in search of a drug dealer with a likely connection. Voight asks for the help of Vice Sergeant Sean McGrady who has an old beef with Upton. When McGrady turns up dead during the investigation, the case takes an unlikely turn as the suspected killer turns out to be the drug dealer Intelligence is investigating, but the evidence doesn't add up.
91	7	"Care Under Fire"	Lily Mariye	Gwen Sigan	November 15, 2017	507	6.39
In the wake of several gang-related child abductions, Intelligence must race against time to find a kidnapped boy. Owing to the kidnappers' swiftness and military precision, the team scours the VA records and narrows it down to a former Army Ranger. Because of his previous experience as a Ranger, Halstead convinces Voight to send him undercover to try and get information from inside, but the longer he stays the more he begins to form a friendship with the suspect and his sister, which causes Halstead some problems.
92	8	"Politics"	Mark Tinker	Kinan Copen	November 29, 2017	508	6.95
The Intelligence unit investigates the murder of a young woman and a powerful Congressman found unconscious with him in his hotel room. Voight begins to think he might have been set up. Meanwhile, Burgess begins to see a new guy, a prosecutor, however, things become rocky quickly as he becomes involved in the case.
93	9	"Monster"	Valerie Weiss	Timothy J. Sexton	December 6, 2017	509	6.52
The Intelligence unit investigates a string of opioid overdoses, one of the victims is the daughter of a well respected Chicago judge. The deaths lead to an epidemic when it spreads into family neighborhoods. Meanwhile, Ruzek continues to get blackmailed by Lieutenant Woods into finding dirt on Voight to take him down. The episode ends with Ruzek and Olinsky heading to an unknown area to meet one of Olinsky's CI's who is later revealed to be none other than Voight which leaves Ruzek stunned.
94	10	"Rabbit Hole"	Carl Seaton	Rick Eid & Gwen Sigan	January 3, 2018	510	6.78
The relationship between Halstead and his new girlfriend Camila takes a dramatic turn when he unintentionally gets himself in the middle of a drug operation and a murder of an undercover DEA agent. He later finds out that Camila is a person of interest and with Camila thinking that Halstead is another person, he fears to reveal his true identity. Meanwhile, Voight discovers that Ruzek is a mole but to Ruzek's surprise, works with him to take down Woods.
95	11	"Confidential"	Mark Tinker	Rick Eid & Sharon Lee Watson	January 10, 2018	511	6.86
Voight restricts Halstead to desk duty, and orders him to go see a psychologist. Burgess' confidential informant reveals a possible murder which Burgess discounts but Upton pursues, revealing a corpse which ultimately leads to a prostitution ring. Upton and Burgess butt heads on how to handle confidential informants. Wrapping the stressful case sees Burgess turn to her former lover Ruzek.
96	12	"Captive"	Eriq La Salle	Gavin Harris	January 17, 2018	512	6.66
Atwater is kidnapped while visiting an ex-felon whose son he was forced to shoot in self-defense back when he was a patrol cop and is later forced to make an impossible decision when he is accused of stealing drugs while, the Intelligence Unit desperately begins to track down Atwater's whereabouts.
97	13	"Chasing Monsters"	Terry Miller	John Dove	January 31, 2018	513	6.72
The squad work with a visiting detective to put an end to a gang's vicious tactics. However, Burgess and Antonio discover the visiting detective is hiding a secret. Meanwhile, a body is found and Lieutenant Woods is convinced that Voight is the one who buried it.
98	14	"Anthem"	John Hyams	Timothy J. Sexton	February 7, 2018	515	7.25
Voight and Woods put their differences aside when an African-American teenager is murdered at an anti-police rally after kneeling in protest. Things get complicated when Woods' own daughter, Brianna, is involved along with her boyfriend.
99	15	"Sisterhood"	Rohn Schmidt	Rick Eid & Katherine Visconti	February 28, 2018	514	6.09
After the body of a rape victim turns up, the Intelligence unit discovers the perpetrators of the crime dead and castrated. The investigation forces the team to work with street gangs in order to solve the murders. Meanwhile, the case reminds Burgess of the sexual violence her sister suffered and leaves her questioning whether justice was truly served to the men responsible.
100	16	"Profiles"	Eriq La Salle	Gwen Sigan	March 7, 2018	516	6.62
A bombing in a TV studio where Sergeant Platt is being interviewed is broadcast live. The Intelligence unit investigates and discovers that this bomber is targeting members of the media. Voight goes to Firehouse 51 for help with the investigation. Meanwhile, Dawson discovers that his daughter has two social media accounts and lied about it. This episode begins a crossover with Chicago Fire that concludes on "Hiding Not Seeking." It is included on the Chicago Fire Season 6 DVD set.
101	17	"Breaking Point"	Terry Miller	Sharon Lee Watson	March 14, 2018	517	6.54
The Intelligence unit investigates the murder of a wealthy and prominent black alderman and his son who tried to change their old neighborhood, only to get caught up in a violent heroin scandal. Meanwhile, Olinsky receives an ultimatum from Woods after he is accused of a crime when his DNA was found on a body.
102	18	"Ghosts"	Nick Gomez	Gavin Harris	March 21, 2018	518	6.92
The Intelligence unit investigates of a meth dealer that Upton knows, and she is forced to revisit her undercover days to stop the meth ring. Meanwhile, Voight calls in a favor in order to help Olinsky.
103	19	"Payback"	Nicole Rubio	Story by : John Dove; Teleplay by : John Dove & Timothy J. Sexton	April 11, 2018	519	5.89
The Unit investigates a string of house robberies that leads to one of their own. Meanwhile, Voight looks for evidence and a witness in order to exonerate Olinsky.
104	20	"Saved"	Paul McCrane	Gwen Sigan	April 18, 2018	520	6.62
Voight witnesses a young woman who has connections to his past being kidnapped in broad daylight. Intelligence searches for connections to the kidnapping that might help find the people responsible for several bank robberies. Meanwhile, Ruzek gets wind that they are selecting a grand jury for Olinsky’s trial.
105	21	"Allegiance"	Carl Seaton	Rick Eid & Timothy J. Sexton	May 2, 2018	521	6.06
Voight attempts a last minute scramble in order to exonerate Olinsky after he gets arrested and charged for the murder. Meanwhile, Halstead and Atwater go undercover in order to stop the production of high grade military weapons from hitting the streets.
106	22	"Homecoming"	Eriq La Salle	Rick Eid & Timothy J. Sexton	May 9, 2018	522	6.34
When Olinsky gets stabbed in prison and dies from his injuries, the team are left devastated by the loss and begin conducting an investigation to find out who was responsible for the hit on their colleague as Woods looks to take down Voight once and for all. Later, Voight confronts Woods, who has a witness of his own, who claims to have seen Voight and Bingham together the night of the murder. However, the witness wants $20,000, which Woods gives to her on the condition that she exaggerate what she saw to seal the case. Later, Voight tells Woods that he doesn’t understand the difference between dirty and necessary. While Woods hurts innocents for his own ambition, Voight bends the rules to put away the truly evil and dangerous. Then Voight asks about the witness, even mentioning her by name. Woods is arrested by Internal Affairs for bribing the fake witness. The episode ends with an emotional Voight drinking, punching a door and breaking down as he cries, “I’m sorry, Al. So sorry.”: This episode marks the final appearance of Detective Alvin Olinsky (Elias Koteas).

== Production ==
=== Cast changes ===
On May 25, 2017, it was announced that Sophia Bush would be departing the series following the season four finale, while Jon Seda is set to return after the cancellation of Chicago Justice. After recurring last season as Detective Hailey Upton, Tracy Spiridakos has been promoted to a series regular for this season.

Mykelti Williamson reprises his role of Lieutenant Denny Woods in a recurring role, and Wendell Pierce join the cast as Alderman Ray Price, in a recurring role.

Wil Traval guest stars as Sergeant McGrady, who shares a history with Upton. Anabelle Acosta joins the cast in the recurring role of Camila, and began appearing from episode 7, while Zach Appelman made his debut as Burgess' boyfriend and federal prosecutor, Matt Miller from episode 8.

== Ratings ==
Viewership and ratings per episode of Chicago P.D. season 5
No.	Title	Air date	Rating/share (18–49)	Viewers (millions)	DVR (18–49)	DVR viewers (millions)	Total (18–49)	Total viewers (millions)
1	"Reform"	September 27, 2017	1.3/5	6.11	1.0	4.05	2.3	10.16
2	"The Thing About Heroes"	October 4, 2017	1.2/5	6.19	1.1	3.95	2.3	10.14
3	"Promise"	October 11, 2017	1.2/5	6.07	1.0	4.14	2.2	10.21
4	"Snitch"	October 18, 2017	1.1/4	5.79	1.1	4.30	2.2	10.08
5	"Home"	October 25, 2017	1.1/4	6.16	1.1	4.06	2.1	10.22
6	"Fallen"	November 8, 2017	0.9/3	5.16	1.1	4.12	2.0	9.29
7	"Care Under Fire"	November 15, 2017	1.2/5	6.39	1.0	3.95	2.2	10.34
8	"Politics"	November 29, 2017	1.3/5	6.95	1.0	4.19	2.3	11.14
9	"Monster"	December 6, 2017	1.2/5	6.52	1.0	4.12	2.2	10.63
10	"Rabbit Hole"	January 3, 2018	1.4/5	6.78	—N/a	—N/a	—N/a	—N/a
11	"Confidential"	January 10, 2018	1.3/5	6.86	1.1	4.18	2.4	11.04
12	"Captive"	January 17, 2018	1.4/5	6.66	1.0	3.86	2.4	10.53
13	"Chasing Monsters"	January 31, 2018	1.2/5	6.72	1.1	4.13	2.3	10.85
14	"Anthem"	February 7, 2018	1.2/5	7.25	1.1	4.12	2.3	11.37
15	"Sisterhood"	February 28, 2018	1.2/5	6.09	1.1	4.41	2.3	10.50
16	"Profiles"	March 7, 2018	1.2/5	6.62	1.3	4.79	2.5	11.44
17	"Breaking Point"	March 14, 2018	1.2/5	6.54	1.1	4.26	2.3	10.80
18	"Ghosts"	March 21, 2018	1.3/5	6.92	1.0	4.03	2.3	10.96
19	"Payback"	April 11, 2018	1.1/4	5.89	1.0	4.07	2.1	9.96
20	"Saved"	April 18, 2018	1.2/5	6.62	0.9	4.00	2.1	10.62
21	"Allegiance"	May 2, 2018	1.2/5	6.06	1.0	3.90	2.1	9.78
22	"Homecoming"	May 9, 2018	1.2/5	6.34	0.9	3.79	2.1	10.13

== Home media ==
The DVD release of season five was released in Region 1 on September 11, 2018.

The Complete Fifth Season
Set details			Special features
22 episodes; 976 minutes (Region 1); 6-disc set; 1.78:1 aspect ratio; Languages: English (Dolby Digital 5.1); Subtitles: English (Region 1); French (Region 1)			Chicago Fire Season 6 Crossover Episode - "Hiding Not Seeking"
Release dates			Chicago Fire Season 6 Crossover Episode - "Hiding Not Seeking"
United States	United Kingdom	Australia	Chicago Fire Season 6 Crossover Episode - "Hiding Not Seeking"
September 11, 2018			Chicago Fire Season 6 Crossover Episode - "Hiding Not Seeking"
