= Chicago P.D. season 4 =

Chicago P.D.
- Season 4
- Chicago P.D. Season 4 DVD cover
- Showrunners: Matt Olmstead; Michael Brandt; Derek Haas
- No. of episodes: 23

Release
- Original network: NBC
- Original release: September 21, 2016 – May 17, 2017

Season chronology
- ← Previous; Season 3 Next → Season 5

The fourth season of Chicago P.D., an American police drama television series with executive producer Dick Wolf, and producers Derek Haas, Michael Brandt, and Matt Olmstead, premiered on September 21, 2016 and concluded on May 17, 2017. The season contained 23 episodes. It is the final season featuring Sophia Bush as Erin Lindsay.

== Cast ==
=== Regular ===
- Jason Beghe as Sergeant Henry "Hank" Voight
- Jon Seda as Senior Detective Antonio Dawson (episode 1–8)
- Sophia Bush as Detective Erin Lindsay
- Jesse Lee Soffer as Detective Jay Halstead
- Patrick John Flueger as Officer Adam Ruzek
- Marina Squerciati as Officer Kim Burgess (episode 1–19 and episode 20–23 credit only)
- LaRoyce Hawkins as Officer Kevin Atwater
- Amy Morton as Desk Sergeant Trudy Platt
- Elias Koteas as Undercover Senior Detective Alvin Olinsky

=== Recurring ===
- Samuel Hunt as Greg "Mouse" Gerwitz
- Barbara Eve Harris as Commander Emma Crowley
- Markie Post as Barbara "Bunny" Fletcher
- Chris Agos as Assistant State's Attorney Steve Kot
- Esai Morales as Chief Lugo
- Nick Wechsler as Detective Kenny Rixton
- Li Jun Li as Officer Julie Tay
- Jules Willcox as Nicole Silver
- Kevin Kane as Officer Mike Sorensen
- Ian Bedford as Commander Ed Fogel
- Tony Crane as Jimmy Sanguinetti
- Tracy Spiridakos as Detective Hailey Upton

=== Special guest star ===
- Billy Burke as Jake McCoy
- Arthur-Angelo Sarinas as Loo

=== Crossover ===
- Jesse Spencer as CFD Lieutenant Matthew Casey
- Taylor Kinney as CFD Lieutenant Kelly Severide
- Monica Raymund as CFD Paramedic Gabriela Dawson
- Eamonn Walker as CFD Battalion Chief Wallace Boden
- David Eigenberg as CFD Firefighter Christopher Herrmann
- Yuri Sardarov as CFD Firefighter Brian "Otis" Zvonecek
- Christian Stolte as CFD Firefighter Randy "Mouch" McHolland
- Kara Killmer as CFD Paramedic in Charge Sylvie Brett
- Nick Gehlfuss as Dr. Will Halstead
- Torrey DeVitto as Dr. Natalie Manning
- Yaya DaCosta as Nurse April Sexton
- Rachel DiPillo as Dr. Sarah Reese
- Colin Donnell as Dr. Connor Rhodes
- Brian Tee as Dr. Ethan Choi
- Marlyne Barrett as Nurse Maggie Lockwood
- S. Epatha Merkerson as Sharon Goodwin
- Oliver Platt as Dr. Daniel Charles
- Carl Weathers as State's Attorney Mark Jefferies
- Philip Winchester as Assistant State's Attorney Peter Stone
- Jon Seda as Chief Investigator Antonio Dawson
- Monica Barbaro as Assistant State's Attorney Anna Valdez
- Deanna Reed-Foster as Tina Cantrell
- Nora Dunn as Dr. Richardson

== Episodes ==
| No. overall | No. in season | Title | Directed by | Written by | Original release date | Prod. code | U.S. viewers (millions) |
|---|---|---|---|---|---|---|---|
| 62 | 1 | "The Silos" | Mark Tinker | Matt Olmstead | September 21, 2016 | 401 | 6.87 |
Sergeant Voight continues to grieve following his son's death. Detective Lindsay tries to keep quiet her knowledge of what happened between Voight and Justin's killer, and an internal investigation by the Chicago Police is conducted. Meanwhile, the Intelligence unit investigates an arson case which later turns to murder, and Officer Burgess meets her new partner Julie Tay (guest star Li Jun Li).
| 63 | 2 | "Made a Wrong Turn" | Fred Berner | Craig Gore & Tim Walsh | September 28, 2016 | 402 | 6.14 |
As Chicago experiences the hottest day of the summer, the Intelligence unit investigates the case of a missing woman in a notorious African American neighbourhood with her fiancé being found alive and brought to Chicago Med for treatment. Platt is threatened by Commander Fogel (guest star Ian Bedford) over her decision to have Tay reassigned to the 21st, and Mouse announces his plans to reenlist in the Army Rangers.
| 64 | 3 | "All Cylinders Firing" | Nick Gomez | Mike Weiss | October 5, 2016 | 404 | 6.22 |
The Intelligence unit investigates after Platt is attacked while walking to her car. As the investigation develops, the unit finds Platt's father beaten to death and that his much younger girlfriend may have been involved. Meanwhile, after Burgess lets a key piece of case information slip, Platt escapes the hospital to find her own justice for her father.
| 65 | 4 | "Big Friends, Big Enemies" | Rohn Schmidt | Gwen Sigan | October 12, 2016 | 405 | 6.15 |
The Intelligence unit investigates a drive-by shooting, which kills a local rap star. Voight initially suspects a terrorist group may be involved, but, after a second shooting in gang territory, the unit considers the possibility that both crimes are part of a gang war. Meanwhile, Burgess spots Atwater's younger brother while out visiting potential shooters and targets.
| 66 | 5 | "A War Zone" | Eriq La Salle | Tiller Russell | October 26, 2016 | 403 | 5.82 |
The Intelligence Unit investigates after a body and a bag full of fentanyl, a drug that has been linked to a string of overdoses throughout Chicago, wash ashore. Meanwhile, Platt informs Tay that she has been reassigned to her original post, and Mouse causes tension within the unit as he continues to try and have a felony charge dropped so he can reenlist in the Army.
| 67 | 6 | "Some Friend" | Mark Tinker | Timothy J. Sexton | November 9, 2016 | 406 | 5.70 |
Burgess and new partner Officer Sorensen (guest star Kevin Kane) respond to a noise complaint from a house, only to find a dead teenage girl inside. The unit investigates the murder, which turns out to be the home of famous local baseball player Jake McCoy (guest star Billy Burke), who happens to be an old friend of Olinsky's. Also, after Lindsay mysteriously receives an arrangement of daisies, Halstead tracks them to a florist near Leavenworth Penitentiary, a prison which Erin reveals her father has served time in.
| 68 | 7 | "300,000 Likes" | Charlotte Brandström | Jamie Pachino | November 16, 2016 | 407 | 6.11 |
The unit investigates the murder of a key witness in an ongoing high profile rape trial. After pulling over an erratic driver, Burgess and Sorensen find the driver wearing a skirt, fishnet stockings and a chastity belt, recording it on their body cams. Sorensen later posts the video to his Facebook account. Meanwhile, Antonio is offered a lead investigator job at the attorney's office by Peter Stone (guest star Philip Winchester).
| 69 | 8 | "A Shot Heard Around the World" | Terry Miller | Matt Olmstead & Gwen Sigan | November 16, 2016 | 408 | 6.11 |
The Intelligence unit deals with a highly trained sniper who has targeted and killed two patrol officers. Meanwhile, having accepted Stone's job offer, Antonio deals with the aftermath of telling the team, and, later at his farewell party, Voight offers Burgess a position in Intelligence. Also, Bunny drops a bombshell on Lindsay: her biological father is in town and wants to meet her.
| 70 | 9 | "Don't Bury This Case" | Cherie Nowlan | Craig Gore & Tim Walsh | January 3, 2017 | 409 | 7.89 |
Severide is accused of a hit-and-run accident, which later turns into a vehicular homicide when one of the victims, a child, dies from her injuries. Lindsay and Voight suspect that Severide was set up while friendships and relationships are put to the test as the detectives and cops are forced to toe a very thin line with their friends at Firehouse 51 as the evidence against Severide mounts. Meanwhile, Burgess begins her first day in Intelligence and immediately clashes with Olinsky. Also, Lindsay contemplates meeting her father. This episode concludes a crossover with Chicago Fire which began on "Some Make It, Some Don't". It is included on the Chicago Fire Season 5 DVD set.
| 71 | 10 | "Don't Read the News" | Nick Gomez | Mike Weiss | January 4, 2017 | 410 | 6.30 |
The Intelligence unit investigates the murder of a young woman, and later discovers that her murder may be connected to a potential serial killer who has murdered more than 10 women. Meanwhile, Voight introduces Kenny Rixton (guest star Nick Wechsler) to the unit as a temporary replacement for Ruzek while he is on an undercover assignment and Lindsay finally meets her biological father (guest star Tony Crane).
| 72 | 11 | "You Wish" | Mark Tinker | Tiller Russell | January 11, 2017 | 411 | 6.60 |
The Intelligence unit investigates the murder of a sex offender, who has been killed and his body mutilated. A search of the victim's past brings Intelligence into conflict with The Special Police, a private, sanctioned police force that patrols private properties and operates independently of the CPD's rules and regulations. Meanwhile, much to Lindsay's dismay, Halstead runs a DNA on Jimmy and discovers that he is not Erin's father.
| 73 | 12 | "Sanctuary" | John Hyams | Timothy J. Sexton | January 18, 2017 | 412 | 7.11 |
The Intelligence unit is put in a precarious situation when the suspects of the murder of a jogger seek refuge in a church, and the priest and parishioners block law enforcement from entering. Rixton goes behind Voight's back to question a gang member in relation to the case, and when Voight finds out, he threatens to bounce Rixton from the unit. Burgess saves Olinsky's life and gains his respect. Also, Atwater performs his first comedy gig at Molly's.
| 74 | 13 | "I Remember Her Now" | David Rodriguez | Gwen Sigan | February 8, 2017 | 413 | 6.27 |
The team investigates the murder of a 15-year-old girl, who died of severe injuries. The girl, Sam, was enrolled in a program for troubled girls. Halstead goes undercover at the program when the team discovers suspicious behavior by the staff members. Platt finds out that Sam had visited District 21 and feels bad for not remembering her.
| 75 | 14 | "Seven Indictments" | Mark Tinker | Jamie Pachino | February 15, 2017 | 414 | 6.68 |
The Intelligence unit investigates after a house explosion leaves a body burned beyond recognition. With no witnesses, Intelligence finds it difficult to track down the person responsible. Meanwhile, tensions run high when Lindsay and Halstead discover that Rixton's old unit is up on indictment charges and suspect that Rixton ratted them out. While trying to help a homeless man, Platt gets pricked by a dirty needle. Ruzek returns after his lengthy undercover operation.
| 76 | 15 | "Favor, Affection, Malice or Ill-Will" | Holly Dale | Craig Gore & Tim Walsh | February 22, 2017 | 415 | 6.68 |
Lindsay enlists Olinsky to go undercover as a hitman for hire after a tipoff from an old friend about a grieving father wanting to avenge his daughter's murder. Meanwhile, Ruzek returns from his undercover assignment and is surprised when Voight demotes him to patrol. Later, Rixton offers Ruzek his original spot in the Intelligence back, revealing he has accepted a position on a narcotics team.
| 77 | 16 | "Emotional Proximity" | Reza Tabrizi | Matt Olmstead | March 1, 2017 | 416 | 9.59 |
Intelligence investigates in the wake of the warehouse fire that left Olinsky's daughter Lexi in critical condition. The team is on edge as they race to find the person responsible for starting the fire. After Lexi succumbs to her injuries and dies, a grief-stricken Olinsky pitches in to track down the suspect. During a candlelight vigil for the 39 victims, Lindsay spots the suspect and, after taking him into custody, they hand the case over to Antonio Dawson (guest star Jon Seda) and Peter Stone (guest star Philip Winchester) at the State's Attorney's Office. This episode continues a crossover with Chicago Fire and Chicago Justice that began on "Deathtrap" and concludes on "Fake." It is included on the Chicago Fire Season 5 and Chicago Justice Season 1 DVD sets.
| 78 | 17 | "Remember the Devil" | Rohn Schmidt | Mike Weiss | March 22, 2017 | 417 | 6.39 |
The Intelligence unit investigates a woman being held captive in a shipping container who refuses to help find the suspect involved. When a video goes viral, the team realizes that there is a second hostage, and they race against time to find her. Meanwhile an ex-girlfriend of Halstead's turns up in Chicago and drops the bombshell that they are still married, and Olinsky returns to work following his daughter's death.
| 79 | 18 | "Little Bit of Light" | Lin Oeding | Gwen Sigan | March 29, 2017 | 418 | 6.10 |
The Intelligence unit investigates the murder of a "night crawler", a freelance videographer who films crime scenes. When Olinsky and Ruzek find hidden video footage, the team realise the victim was blackmailing one of the wealthiest families in Chicago after filming a rape confession. Meanwhile, Burgess' sister Nicole is in town and immediately clashes with Ruzek, before revealing to a stunned Burgess that she is getting a divorce.
| 80 | 19 | "Last Minute Resistance" | John Hyams | Timothy J. Sexton | April 5, 2017 | 419 | 6.52 |
After a night out with friends, Burgess' sister Nicole is drugged and sexually assaulted. The Intelligence unit bands together to investigate the brutal attack, and soon find one of Nicole's friends is missing, only to later be found dead, having escaped the men who took both women. Lindsay and Burgess head undercover to draw out the suspects, and when one of the suspects tries to assault Burgess, the rest of the team move in to make an arrest. Later, Burgess takes temporary leave from Intelligence to care for her sister.
| 81 | 20 | "Grasping for Salvation" | David Rodriguez | Tiller Russell | April 26, 2017 | 420 | 6.27 |
When a teenage boy is shot dead, the Intelligence unit begins to investigate, soon discovering the gun recovered is the same gun used in a case Voight investigated 17 years earlier. As the victim's father, a prominent lawyer, tries to get the case taken from Intelligence, Voight digs into his past case, becoming suspicious of his old partner. As both Intelligence and Voight close in on the truth, Voight's ex-partner and now lieutenant, Denny Woods (guest star Mykelti Williamson), puts him up in front of the review board for disobeying direct orders.
| 82 | 21 | "Fagin" | Fred Berner | Craig Gore & Tim Walsh | May 3, 2017 | 421 | 6.15 |
Lindsay and Halstead respond to an in-progress bank robbery. As the Intelligence unit opens an investigation, Detective Hailey Upton (guest star Tracy Spiridakos) from Robbery-Homicide tries to take over; however, Chief Lugo (guest star Esai Morales) grants Voight and his team ownership of the case. While investigating, Lindsay becomes involved in another in-progress robbery and a split-second decision leads to her fatally shooting one of the perpetrators, a member of a teenage gang run by an ex-bank robber.: This episode marks the first appearance of Detective Hailey Upton (Tracy Spiridakos).
| 83 | 22 | "Army of One" | John Whitesell | Tiller Russell & Timothy J. Sexton | May 10, 2017 | 422 | 6.17 |
The Intelligence unit investigates the murder of a man burned alive after it was streamed live on Facebook. Detective Upton joins Intelligence. During the investigation, the unit discovers the victim was accused of statutory rape. When a second man convicted of pedophilia is also burned alive, Olinsky goes undercover to draw out the perpetrator. Later, while the perpetrator is in custody, Lindsay assaults him.
| 84 | 23 | "Fork in the Road" | Mark Tinker | Mike Weiss | May 17, 2017 | 423 | 6.50 |
While in front of the review board facing disciplinary actions, Lindsay receives a distressed call from her mother who has found her boyfriend shot. Intelligence takes on the case and quickly discovers their case is related to high school students who are overdosing, before learning that Bunny is more involved than they were first led to believe while, Lugo gives Voight an ultimatum regarding Lindsay, which prompts him to broker a deal with the FBI and Halstead plans on proposing to Lindsay, but before he can, Lindsay accepts a job with the FBI in New York, resulting in her resigning from the Intelligence Unit and the Chicago Police Department.: This episode marks the final appearance of Detective Erin Lindsay (Sophia Bush).

== Production ==
=== Casting ===
Li Jun Li joins the cast as Officer Julie Tay for a three episode guest spot. She is set to replace Brian Geraghty's character Officer Sean Roman as Officer Kim Burgess' (Marina Squerciati) partner, after he left the series at the end of last season. On September 28, it was reported that Jon Seda as character Antonio Dawson would move from P.D. to Justice, where Antonio became an investigator for the SA's office. It was further reported on October 5 that Seda's last episode of P.D. would be episode 8.

Nick Wechsler joins the cast as Kenny Rixton, a former protégé of Voight's, for a multi-episode arc. On February 7, 2017, it was revealed that Esai Morales join the cast as Chief Lugo, a veteran of the Police Department who is trying to steer the CPD into a new style of policing. His first appearance was in the three-way crossover with Chicago Fire and Chicago Justice, before recurring throughout the remainder of the season.

Set to recur as Hailey Upton, a robbery homicide Detective, Tracy Spiridakos joins the cast, with her first episode slated to air in early May. Squerciati took maternity leave from the show in March 2017, and Kim made her temporary departure in "Last Minute Resistance".

On May 25, 2017, following the season four finale, Sophia Bush announced that she would be departing the series.

=== Crossovers ===
A crossover starting on Chicago Fire and concluding on Chicago P.D. aired on January 3, 2017.

A three-way crossover between Chicago Fire, Chicago P.D. and the premiere of Chicago Justice aired on March 1, 2017, with heavy involvement from Chicago Med.

== Ratings ==
Viewership and ratings per episode of Chicago P.D. season 4
| No. | Title | Air date | Rating/share (18–49) | Viewers (millions) | DVR (18–49) | DVR viewers (millions) | Total (18–49) | Total viewers (millions) |
|---|---|---|---|---|---|---|---|---|
| 1 | "The Silos" | September 21, 2016 | 1.6/5 | 6.87 | 1.0 | 3.83 | 2.4 | 10.71 |
| 2 | "Made a Wrong Turn" | September 28, 2016 | 1.5/5 | 6.14 | 1.1 | 3.74 | 2.6 | 9.88 |
| 3 | "All Cylinders Firing" | October 5, 2016 | 1.4/5 | 6.22 | 1.0 | 3.77 | 2.4 | 9.99 |
| 4 | "Big Friends, Big Enemies" | October 12, 2016 | 1.4/5 | 6.15 | 1.1 | 3.62 | 2.5 | 9.78 |
| 5 | "A War Zone" | October 26, 2016 | 1.3/4 | 5.82 | 1.0 | 3.76 | 2.3 | 9.58 |
| 6 | "Some Friend" | November 9, 2016 | 1.3/5 | 5.70 | 0.8 | 2.76 | 2.1 | 8.46 |
| 7 | "300,000 Likes" | November 16, 2016 | 1.2/4 | 6.11 | 1.1 | 3.63 | 2.3 | 9.74 |
| 8 | "A Shot Heard Around the World" | November 16, 2016 | 1.2/4 | 6.11 | 1.1 | 3.63 | 2.3 | 9.74 |
| 9 | "Don't Bury This Case" | January 3, 2017 | 1.7/6 | 7.89 | 0.9 | 3.36 | 2.6 | 11.25 |
| 10 | "Don't Read the News" | January 4, 2017 | 1.5/6 | 6.30 | 0.9 | 3.24 | 2.4 | 9.59 |
| 11 | "You Wish" | January 11, 2017 | 1.5/5 | 6.60 | 1.0 | 3.83 | 2.5 | 10.43 |
| 12 | "Sanctuary" | January 18, 2017 | 1.5/6 | 7.11 | 1.1 | 3.73 | 2.6 | 10.84 |
| 13 | "I Remember Her Now" | February 8, 2017 | 1.3/5 | 6.27 | 1.0 | 3.76 | 2.3 | 10.03 |
| 14 | "Seven Indictments" | February 15, 2017 | 1.3/5 | 6.68 | 1.1 | 3.80 | 2.4 | 10.48 |
| 15 | "Favor, Affection, Malice or Ill-Will" | February 22, 2017 | 1.3/5 | 6.68 | 1.0 | 3.70 | 2.3 | 10.38 |
| 16 | "Emotional Proximity" | March 1, 2017 | 1.9/7 | 9.59 | —N/a | —N/a | —N/a | —N/a |
| 17 | "Remember The Devil" | March 22, 2017 | 1.2/5 | 6.39 | 1.1 | 3.82 | 2.3 | 10.20 |
| 18 | "Little Bit of Light" | March 29, 2017 | 1.2/5 | 6.10 | 1.0 | 3.88 | 2.2 | 9.98 |
| 19 | "Last Minute Resistance" | April 5, 2017 | 1.3/5 | 6.52 | 0.9 | 3.52 | 2.2 | 10.03 |
| 20 | "Grasping For Salvation" | April 26, 2017 | 1.2/4 | 6.27 | —N/a | —N/a | —N/a | —N/a |
| 21 | "Fagin" | May 3, 2017 | 1.2/4 | 6.15 | 1.0 | 3.89 | 2.2 | 10.04 |
| 22 | "Army of One" | May 10, 2017 | 1.3/5 | 6.17 | 1.0 | 3.84 | 2.3 | 10.01 |
| 23 | "Fork in the Road" | May 17, 2017 | 1.3/5 | 6.50 | 1.0 | 3.86 | 2.3 | 10.35 |

== Home media ==
The Complete Fourth Season
| Set details | | | Special features |
| 23 episodes; 1,110 minutes (Region 1); 6-disc set; 1.78:1 aspect ratio; Languages: English (Dolby Digital 5.1); Subtitles: English (Region 1); French (Region 1) | | | Chicago Fire Season 5 Crossover Episodes; "Some Make It, Some Don't"; "Deathtrap"; Chicago Justice Season 1 Crossover Episode - "Fake" |
| Release dates | | | Chicago Fire Season 5 Crossover Episodes; "Some Make It, Some Don't"; "Deathtrap"; Chicago Justice Season 1 Crossover Episode - "Fake" |
| United States | United Kingdom | Australia | Chicago Fire Season 5 Crossover Episodes; "Some Make It, Some Don't"; "Deathtrap"; Chicago Justice Season 1 Crossover Episode - "Fake" |
| September 12, 2017 | | October 4, 2017 | Chicago Fire Season 5 Crossover Episodes; "Some Make It, Some Don't"; "Deathtrap"; Chicago Justice Season 1 Crossover Episode - "Fake" |
