= Chicago P.D. season 11 =

Chicago P.D.
- Season 11
- Chicago P.D. Season 11 DVD cover
- Showrunner: Gwen Sigan
- Starring: Jason Beghe; Tracy Spiridakos; Marina Squerciati; Patrick John Flueger; LaRoyce Hawkins; Benjamin Levy Aguilar; Amy Morton
- No. of episodes: 13

Release
- Original network: NBC
- Original release: January 17 – May 22, 2024

Season chronology
- ← Previous; Season 10 Next → Season 12

The eleventh season of the American police procedural television series Chicago P.D. premiered on January 17, 2024, on NBC, for the 2023–24 television season. Chicago P.D. revolves around the members of the Intelligence Unit of the 21st District of the Chicago Police Department. The season stars Jason Beghe, Tracy Spiridakos, Marina Squerciati, Patrick John Flueger, LaRoyce Hawkins, Benjamin Levy Aguilar, and Amy Morton. The season concluded on May 22, 2024, and contained 13 episodes. The season was affected by strikes undertaken by the Writers Guild of America (which began on May 2 and ended on September 27) and SAG-AFTRA (which began on July 14 and ended on November 9). This season marks the final appearance of Detective Hailey Upton (portrayed by Tracy Spiridakos).

== Cast and characters ==
=== Main ===
- Jason Beghe as Sergeant Henry "Hank" Voight
- Tracy Spiridakos as Detective Hailey Upton
- Marina Squerciati as Officer Kim Burgess
- Patrick John Flueger as Officer Adam Ruzek
- LaRoyce Hawkins as Officer Kevin Atwater
- Benjamin Levy Aguilar as Officer Dante Torres
- Amy Morton as Desk Sergeant Trudy Platt

=== Recurring ===
- Sara Bues as ASA Nina Chapman
- Yara Martinez as Gloria Perez
- Bojana Novakovic as Detective Josephine "Jo" Petrovic

=== Special guest star ===
- Elias Koteas as Alvin Olinsky

== Episodes ==
No. overall	No. in season	Title	Directed by	Written by	Original release date	Prod. code	U.S. viewers (millions)
209	1	"Unpacking"	Chad Saxton	Gwen Sigan	January 17, 2024	1101	5.82
Six months after Ruzek is shot, he is now struggling to get back in shape to get back on the job. During a day of shadowing in a social worker diversion program, Upton struggles with a case due to ongoing changes in her personal life.
210	2	"Retread"	Lisa Robinson	Gavin Harris	January 24, 2024	1102	5.48
While waiting for news on whether he'll be allowed to join Intelligence once again, Ruzek attends a late night poker game which is soon robbed, leaving one man dead. As Intelligence investigate, Voight goes to great lengths to protect Ruzek.
211	3	"Safe Harbor"	Takashi Doscher	Scott Gold	January 31, 2024	1103	5.53
While working an extra shift in the 13th District, Burgess is caught in a cross fire while tending to a homeless facility, sending the team on a hunt for the killer while Ruzek returns to Intelligence following his rehabilitation.
212	4	"Escape"	Chad Saxton	David Rambo	February 7, 2024	1104	5.07
As Torres returns from a leave of absence, he goes undercover to apprehend a high profile drug trafficker that the Intelligence unit tried and failed to make a case for conviction in the past.
213	5	"Split Second"	Eric Laneuville	Tiffany Bratcher	February 21, 2024	1105	5.35
After a jewellery heist turns deadly, Atwater turns to an unlikely ally to help with the case while struggling with guilt over his failure to save one of the victims during the robbery.
214	6	"Survival"	Victor Macias	Matthew Browne	February 28, 2024	1106	5.16
The Intelligence unit investigates the abduction and torture of a homeless teenager with evidence revealing that it's a homophobic hate crime while Voight makes a decision when he discovers that the victim's family have disowned him for being gay.
215	7	"The Living and the Dead"	Chad Saxton	Teleplay by : Gwen Sigan; Story by : Gavin Harris & Gwen Sigan	March 20, 2024	1107	5.06
The Intelligence unit continues to work on a case which soon revealed to be a serial killer after discovering two more bodies with the same MO as Voight tries to get Noah to open up about his trauma and what happened to him to help with the case.
216	8	"On Paper"	Nicole Rubio	Teleplay by : Jeffrey M. Lee; Story by : Gavin Harris & Jeffrey M. Lee	March 27, 2024	1108	5.17
With the case involving a serial killer reaches a standpoint, the Intelligence unit looks into a new case involving the abduction of an infant child while Upton looks into a profiler, who is helping with the cases past as to why she won't work in the field.
217	9	"Somos Uno"	Chad Saxton	Gavin Harris	April 3, 2024	1109	4.75
The Intelligence unit continues to investigate and take down a drug kingpin while Torres is put into a difficult situation while undercover after Burgess discovers that he is in a romantic relationship with a Confidential Informant.
218	10	"Buried Pieces"	Brenna Malloy	Gwen Sigan	May 1, 2024	1110	5.01
While Voight is out of town following a lead on a cold case, Upton takes the lead of the intelligence unit. When a lead on a missing persons case turn from cold to hot, Upton asks profiler Petrovic for assistance. Upton is forced to make a decision when Petrovic's alcoholism becomes a problem.
219	11	"The Water Line"	Gia-Rayne Harris	Scott Gold	May 8, 2024	1111	4.73
When Voight returns to Chicago, the Intelligence unit investigates a string of violent robberies with one of Atwater’s CI becoming extremely close to the case. Atwater’s ongoing guilt with a past case affects his job.
220	12	"Inventory"	Jesse Lee Soffer	Gavin Harris & Gwen Sigan	May 15, 2024	1112	4.99
The Intelligence might have caught a break in the serial murder cold case. Voight discovers that the killer might be a police officer. Meanwhile, Upton checks in with Petrovic after she returns to work from a stint in rehab.
221	13	"More"	Chad Saxton	Teleplay by : Gwen Sigan; Story by : Rick Eid & Gavin Harris & Gwen Sigan	May 22, 2024	1113	4.89
As she considers a huge life-changing decision, Upton and the Intelligence unit race against the clock to search for Voight after he is kidnapped by Frank Matson, the serial killer cop they were investigating. Meanwhile, Voight does everything in his power to stay alive long enough for his team to rescue him and take down Matson.: This episode marks the final appearance of Detective Hailey Upton (Tracy Spiridakos).

== Production ==
On October 24, 2023, it was announced that Tracy Spiridakos, who has portrayed Detective Hailey Upton since the fifth season, would exit at the end of the season.

In March 2024, it was announced that Jesse Lee Soffer would return to direct another episode.

== Ratings ==
Viewership and ratings per episode of Chicago P.D. season 11
No.	Title	Air date	Rating (18–49)	Viewers (millions)	DVR (18–49)	DVR viewers (millions)	Total (18–49)	Total viewers (millions)
1	"Unpacking"	January 17, 2024	0.6	5.82	—N/a	—N/a	—N/a	—N/a
2	"Retread"	January 24, 2024	0.5	5.48	—N/a	—N/a	—N/a	—N/a
3	"Safe Harbor"	January 31, 2024	0.5	5.53	—N/a	—N/a	—N/a	—N/a
4	"Escape"	February 7, 2024	0.5	5.07	—N/a	—N/a	—N/a	—N/a
5	"Split Second"	February 21, 2024	0.5	5.40	—N/a	—N/a	—N/a	—N/a
6	"Survival"	February 28, 2024	0.5	5.16	—N/a	—N/a	—N/a	—N/a
7	"The Living and the Dead"	March 20, 2024	0.4	5.06	—N/a	—N/a	—N/a	—N/a
8	"On Paper"	March 27, 2024	0.5	5.17	—N/a	—N/a	—N/a	—N/a
9	"Somos Uno"	April 3, 2024	0.4	4.75	—N/a	—N/a	—N/a	—N/a
10	"Buried Pieces"	May 1, 2024	0.4	5.01	—N/a	—N/a	—N/a	—N/a
11	"The Water Line"	May 8, 2024	0.4	4.73	—N/a	—N/a	—N/a	—N/a
12	"Inventory"	May 15, 2024	0.5	4.99	—N/a	—N/a	—N/a	—N/a
13	"More"	May 22, 2024	0.4	4.89	—N/a	—N/a	—N/a	—N/a
