= Chicago Fire season 6 =

Chicago Fire
- Season 6
- Chicago Fire Season 6 DVD cover
- Showrunner: Derek Haas
- No. of episodes: 23

Release
- Original network: NBC
- Original release: September 28, 2017 – May 10, 2018

Season chronology
- ← Previous; Season 5 Next → Season 7

The sixth season of Chicago Fire, an American drama television series with executive producer Dick Wolf, and producers Derek Haas and Matt Olmstead, was ordered on May 10, 2017, by NBC. The season premiered on September 28, 2017 with a timeslot change from Tuesday at 10:00 p.m. to Thursday at 10:00 p.m. The season contained twenty-three episodes and concluded on May 10, 2018.

== Overview ==
The show follows the lives of the firefighters and paramedics working at the Chicago Fire Department at the firehouse of Engine 51, Truck 81, Squad 3, Ambulance 61 and Battalion 25.

== Cast and characters ==
=== Main cast ===
- Jesse Spencer as Lieutenant, Later Captain, Matthew Casey, Truck 81
- Taylor Kinney as Lieutenant Kelly Severide, Squad 3
- Monica Raymund as Firefighter/Paramedic Gabriela Dawson, Ambulance 61, Truck 81
- Kara Killmer as Paramedic in Charge Sylvie Brett, Ambulance 61
- David Eigenberg as Firefighter Christopher Herrmann, Truck 81
- Yuri Sardarov as Firefighter Brian "Otis" Zvonecek, Truck 81
- Joe Minoso as Firefighter Joe Cruz, Squad 3
- Christian Stolte as Firefighter Randy "Mouch" McHolland, Truck 81
- Miranda Rae Mayo as Firefighter Stella Kidd, Truck 81
- Eamonn Walker as Chief Wallace Boden, Battalion 25

=== Recurring ===
- Randy Flagler as Firefighter Harold Capp, Rescue Squad 3
- Anthony Ferraris as Firefighter Tony Ferraris, Rescue Squad 3
- DuShon Brown as Connie
- Damon Dayoub as Firefighter Jake Cordova, Truck 81
- Sarah Shahi as Renee Royce
- Treat Williams as Captain Benjamin "Benny" Severide
- Kim Delaney as Jennifer Sheridan
- Jeff Lima as Leon Cruz
- Daniel Di Tomasso as Lieutenant Zach Torbett, Hazmat 2
- Melissa Ponzio as Donna Robbins-Boden
- Robyn Coffin as Cindy Herrmann
- Gordon Clapp as Chaplain Orlovsky
- Gary Cole as Chief Carl Grissom
- Eloise Mumford as Hope Jacquinot
- Daniel Zacapa as Ramón Dawson
- Deanna Reed-Foster as Tina Cantrell
- Quinn Cooke as Bria

=== Crossover characters ===
- Jason Beghe as Sergeant Henry "Hank" Voight
- Jon Seda as Detective Antonio Dawson
- Jesse Lee Soffer as Detective Jay Halstead
- Tracy Spiridakos as Detective Hailey Upton
- Patrick Flueger as Officer Adam Ruzek
- Marina Squerciati as Officer Kim Burgess
- Amy Morton as Desk Sergeant Trudy Platt
- Nick Gehlfuss as Dr. Will Halstead
- Yaya DaCosta as April Sexton, RN
- Colin Donnell as Dr. Connor Rhodes
- Brian Tee as Dr. Ethan Choi
- Marlyne Barrett as Maggie Lockwood

== Episodes ==
| No. overall | No. in season | Title | Directed by | Written by | Original release date | Prod. code | U.S. viewers (millions) |
|---|---|---|---|---|---|---|---|
| 115 | 1 | "It Wasn't Enough" | Reza Tabrizi | Derek Haas | September 28, 2017 | 601 | 7.19 |
With most of Firehouse 51 still trapped in the warehouse fire, Boden makes a split decision and uses water cannons in order to save his men despite the dangers caused by the resulting steam. Two months later, Casey, along with Mouch and the rest of the Firehouse have survived. Casey receives a Medal of Valor and it is revealed he is being considered for promotion to Captain; Casey's view on the matter is that he has had enough politics. Meanwhile, Dawson's father moves out without notice and finds employment once more. Meanwhile, Mouch returns to 51 with a new fitness persona. Also, Brett reunites with a childhood friend, Hope, who strikes up a relationship with Severide. A teacher gets burned in a fire at the high school where Boden's wife, Donna, recently started teaching. Donna later reveals that the fire was not an accident. Kidd moves in with/crashes with Severide.
| 116 | 2 | "Ignite on Contact" | John Hyams | Andrea Newman | October 5, 2017 | 602 | 6.13 |
Boden, Casey, and Severide investigate the fire at Donna's school and discover that it was arson and that one of the kids might be involved. Meanwhile, after a heated exchange at a call, Mouch challenges Firehouse 87 to win the firefighter muster and recruits Brett, Hermann, Otis, Kidd, Casey, and Cruz along with the rest of the Firehouse. Severide discovers the first suspect in the fire at Donna's school wasn't the actual arsonist.
| 117 | 3 | "An Even Bigger Surprise" | Sanford Bookstaver | Jill Weinberger | October 12, 2017 | 603 | 6.16 |
When Boden gets put on a morning detail assignment, a new chief takes over and begins to butt heads with Casey, Brett, and Dawson in regards to Firehouse rules and decisions on calls. Mouch, Otis, and Hermann pull an elaborate surprise for Cruz by flying in Leon, Cruz's brother for his birthday. Brett discovers the real reason Hope left their hometown—right after she's hired at the firehouse. When Boden returns to the firehouse, the new chief surprises Casey after Casey's daring rescue of a would-be suicide jumper.
| 118 | 4 | "A Breaking Point" | Matt Earl Beesley | Michael A. O'Shea | October 19, 2017 | 604 | 6.35 |
During a personal errand, Dawson notices that there is falling concrete from a parking garage worked on by construction workers. The garage soon collapses, trapping Dawson inside along with others. Meanwhile, Casey begins to get overwhelmed with his new found duties as Captain and dreading the promotion ceremony. Also, Brett confronts Hope about the rumor that she stole money.
| 119 | 5 | "Devil's Bargain" | Jono Oliver | Michael Gilvary | October 26, 2017 | 605 | 6.55 |
Severide and Casey come to blows after a dangerous rescue. Brett goes out on a date with a doctor after a call. Otis shows a new tool to the Firehouse. Some money problems cause tension for Hope, Brett, and Stella.
| 120 | 6 | "Down Is Better" | Reza Tabrizi | Derek Haas | November 2, 2017 | 606 | 5.88 |
Kidd receives shocking news that she is being transferred out of 51 following a successful call, Casey and Herrmann look into it thinking that she might be set up. Tensions between Dawson and her father Ramon come to blows. Casey and Boden prove Hope forged Chief Mullins's signature on Kidd's transfer, and Hope is fired from 51. Also, Otis looks into expand Molly's to a second location after finding a perfect location—a bar near his apartment that's going out of business. The episode ends with Dawson and Brett on a call of a stab victim only to Dawson's surprise it's her father Ramon.
| 121 | 7 | "A Man's Legacy" | Joe Chappelle | Alvaro Rodriguez | January 4, 2018 | 607 | 5.96 |
During a call, Dawson is shocked to find her father stabbed and left for dead. She rushes him to Chicago Med where he survives and recovers. Meanwhile, Otis, Kidd, and Hermann prepare for the opening of Molly's North with an advertising blitz. Boden deals with the aftershocks of a call where the victim is a famous blues singer. Brett rekindles her relationship with Antonio Dawson.
| 122 | 8 | "The Whole Point of Being Roommates" | Stephen Cragg | Jamila Daniel | January 11, 2018 | 608 | 5.30 |
Following a call, Dawson keeps a close eye on one of the victims, Bria, and discovers Bria’s father is addicted to painkillers and she is in a bad environment. Meanwhile, Boden meets Donna's brother, Julian, and immediately becomes skeptical of him when he asks for a financial favor. Also, Cruz and Otis investigate into who Brett is dating and Brett again gets cold feet in her relationship with Antonio Dawson.
| 123 | 9 | "Foul Is Fair" | Sanford Bookstaver | Derek Haas | January 18, 2018 | 609 | 5.68 |
Casey and Dawson's relationship becomes strained when she spends most of her time trying to find the missing teen along with Severide. Meanwhile, Otis, Mouch, and Herrmann investigate an overwhelming scent permeating through 51. Kidd and Brett fight for the affection of a good looking Lieutenant from the HAZMAT Unit.
| 124 | 10 | "Slamigan" | Bill Johnson | Andrea Newman | January 25, 2018 | 610 | 6.06 |
Dawson and Casey continue to track down Bria's whereabouts. Meanwhile, Cruz enlists the help from Brett, Otis and Hermann on creating a new rescue tool. Also, Kidd goes on her first date with HAZMAT unit Lieutenant Zach.
| 125 | 11 | "Law of the Jungle" | Reza Tabrizi | Michael A. O'Shea | February 1, 2018 | 611 | 5.67 |
Severide and Casey disagree at a rescue which leads to an outside offer from Chief Grissom to help Severide accelerate through the ranks, but Severide turns it down. Meanwhile, Hermann brings his daughter to work and asks for help from 51 to help entertain her. Dawson offers Brett a spa treatment getaway with a friend and Kidd climbs up the social ladder.
| 126 | 12 | "The F Is For" | James Hanlon | Jill Weinberger | March 1, 2018 | 612 | 5.67 |
Casey and Severide jump from a five-story building’s roof into a river to avoid an explosion and survive. Following the call, a photographer is asked to take pictures of a day in life at Firehouse, however, Casey finds the photographer trying to get photos of Dawson taking a shower. Meanwhile, Kidd begins to search for a new apartment much to Severide's disappointment. Dawson and Brett investigate a homeless person campsite where Gerald, one of its residents, keeps getting assaulted. Hermann is recruited to become a life coach after being seen in action as a compassionate bartender.
| 127 | 13 | "Hiding Not Seeking" | Leslie Libman | Derek Haas & Andrea Newman & Michael Gilvary | March 8, 2018 | 613 | 6.24 |
Hank Voight and the Intelligence unit asks for Firehouse 51's help with Dawson and Brett to go undercover to further their investigation into a serial bomber targeting members of the media. Casey, Boden, and Severide lend their expertise in the investigation. Meanwhile, Kidd's relationship with Zach hits a bump in the road when she discovers that she still has feelings for Severide. This episode concludes a crossover with Chicago P.D. that begins on "Profiles." It is included in the Chicago P.D. Season 5 DVD set.
| 128 | 14 | "Looking for a Lifeline" | Joe Chappelle | Derek Haas | March 22, 2018 | 614 | 6.88 |
Following a call out to a car accident involving a husband and wife, Casey suspects a case of domestic violence when the husband is aggressive and domineering. Meanwhile, Kidd lends Severide a helping hand. meanwhile, Cruz begins to get annoyed when Hermann, Otis and Mouch bring in outside investors for his invention. Elsewhere, Brett confides in Dawson, who suggests that Brett might be pregnant.
| 129 | 15 | "The Chance to Forgive" | Reza Tabrizi | Michael A. O'Shea & Jamila Daniel | March 22, 2018 | 615 | 6.88 |
Firehouse 51 responds to a call of a residential fire, but things take a dramatic turn when gunshots are fired in the home and Otis is severely injured. The gunfire turns out to come not from a shooter but from the ignited cache of ammunition the family's teen son owns. After a negative pregnancy test, Brett discovers her true feelings for Antonio Dawson but is disappointed when she finds out that he had been set up on a blind date. Also, Casey pushes Severide into showing his true feelings for Kidd, which he does. After the mother in the house fire dies, tragedy comes to the teen after criminal charges against him are dropped.
| 130 | 16 | "The One that Matters the Most" | Bill Johnson | Michael Gilvary | March 29, 2018 | 616 | 5.42 |
With Otis out of the firehouse, with complications from the bullet injury, tensions rise when fill-in replacement Cordova rubs Hermann the wrong way. Severide and Stella seem to be getting into a "More than just Friends" relationship. Grissom has a brief fallout with Severide but later, while observing the firehouse on a call, the two combine their efforts to successfully rescue a trapped victim of a scaffolding accident, and they reconcile. Boden considers whether to pursue a major promotion.
| 131 | 17 | "Put White on Me" | Matt Earl Beesley | Story by : Jill Weinberger; Teleplay by : Derek Haas | April 5, 2018 | 617 | 5.48 |
Otis returns to the Firehouse after being released from the hospital and is immediately put on desk work as he continues to go through a long recovery. Meanwhile, Severide's mother (Kim Delaney) comes to Chicago and immediately clashes with Kidd. Casey and Dawson's relationship is seriously tested after a public third party revelation about Dawson’s long past fling with Cordova. A private ambulance company joins Brett and Dawson on several calls and tempts Dawson to consider joining them, until she witnesses their less-than-Hippocratic ethics. After Otis tracks the parents of a young boy rescued from a swimming pool scoreboard accident, and gives the boy to his father, the mother threatens to sue the CFD and the city—until Otis discovers it's a fraud. Severide and Stella get a shock from Severide's father Benny when they return home from a shift.
| 132 | 18 | "When They See Us Coming" | Lin Oeding | Andrea Newman & Michael Gilvary | April 12, 2018 | 618 | 5.64 |
Kelly deals poorly with his parents apparent reconciliation, and later has a major argument with his father. Cruz attempts to mentor Tay, a local youth, which is complicated when the FBI commandeers Firehouse 51 to conduct a stakeout in search for cop killers. Severide's mother gives some advice to Stella, who ponders a big decision. Meanwhile, Otis continues to recover, from his near death injury and is glad to be back at the firehouse helping Connie with “bullpen” duties.
| 133 | 19 | "Where I Want to Be" | Eric Laneuville | Michael A. O'Shea | April 19, 2018 | 619 | 5.39 |
A fire at a cartel stash house leads to a major escalation of violence in the area, when the cartel learns of a $100,000 discrepancy reported in the amount recovered by the police. Cordova's career is put at risk, because of the missing money. Otis' attempt to fast-track his physical therapy bears no fruit and he must consider his long-term future. Cordova has to make a major decision regarding his ability to truly blend into the 51 family. After learning about Kelly’s past marriage and love life, Kidd reconsiders her living arrangements with him. Hermann deals with the fallout of his son moving into his own apartment.
| 134 | 20 | "The Strongest Among Us" | Reza Tabrizi | Derek Haas | April 26, 2018 | 620 | 5.55 |
Otis returns to active duty following his accident and immediately butts heads with Kidd, who wants to continue driving Truck 81. Meanwhile, Severide and Boden receive an anonymous bribe following a call. Also, Bria returns to Dawson's life to help her with prom, and Cruz asks Brett for advice about dating a married woman.
| 135 | 21 | "The Unrivaled Standard" | Joe Chappelle | Jeff Drayer | May 3, 2018 | 621 | 5.54 |
Severide is shocked when he discovers that his old flame Renee Royce (guest star Sarah Shahi) returns to Chicago and asks for a favor of him. Meanwhile, Herrmann and another firehouse lieutenant do not see eye to eye when it comes to their kids basketball game. Also, Casey and Severide actively encourage Boden to seek a promotion. Later, Hermann grieves the loss of his friend, the lieutenant.
| 136 | 22 | "One for the Ages" | Leslie Libman | Michael Gilvary & Andrea Newman | May 10, 2018 | 622 | 5.95 |
Boden runs for Fire Commissioner of Chicago with the Mayor of Chicago endorsing him. Meanwhile, after a call Brett meets a man who is interested in purchasing several of Cruz's Slamigans. Also, Kidd becomes skeptical of Renee's intentions with Severide.
| 137 | 23 | "The Grand Gesture" | Reza Tabrizi | Derek Haas | May 10, 2018 | 623 | 5.95 |
Boden's run for commissioner becomes complicated when his personal life comes to light. Meanwhile, Brett deals with the aftermath following a call that turned dangerous. Also, it is revealed that Dawson and Casey cannot conceive a child of their own and Casey considers adoption much to Dawson's dismay.

== Ratings ==
Viewership and ratings per episode of Chicago Fire season 6
| No. | Title | Air date | Rating/share (18–49) | Viewers (millions) | DVR (18–49) | DVR viewers (millions) | Total (18–49) | Total viewers (millions) |
|---|---|---|---|---|---|---|---|---|
| 1 | "It Wasn't Enough" | September 28, 2017 | 1.5/6 | 7.19 | 1.1 | 4.27 | 2.6 | 11.46 |
| 2 | "Ignite on Contact" | October 5, 2017 | 1.2/4 | 6.13 | 1.1 | 4.21 | 2.3 | 10.33 |
| 3 | "An Even Bigger Surprise" | October 12, 2017 | 1.1/4 | 6.16 | 1.0 | 3.87 | 2.1 | 10.03 |
| 4 | "A Breaking Point" | October 19, 2017 | 1.1/4 | 6.35 | 1.0 | 3.91 | 2.1 | 10.25 |
| 5 | "Devil's Bargain" | October 26, 2017 | 1.2/5 | 6.55 | 1.0 | 3.85 | 2.2 | 10.40 |
| 6 | "Down is Better" | November 2, 2017 | 1.0/4 | 5.88 | 1.1 | 4.01 | 2.1 | 9.89 |
| 7 | "A Man's Legacy" | January 4, 2018 | 1.1/4 | 5.96 | 0.8 | 3.32 | 1.9 | 9.28^{1} |
| 8 | "The Whole Point of Being Roommates" | January 11, 2018 | 0.9/3 | 5.30 | 1.1 | 4.19 | 2.0 | 9.49 |
| 9 | "Foul is Fair" | January 18, 2018 | 1.0/4 | 5.68 | 1.0 | 3.98 | 2.0 | 9.66 |
| 10 | "Slamigan" | January 25, 2018 | 1.1/4 | 6.06 | 1.0 | 4.03 | 2.1 | 10.09 |
| 11 | "Law of the Jungle" | February 1, 2018 | 1.0/4 | 5.67 | 1.1 | 4.08 | 2.1 | 9.75 |
| 12 | "The F is For" | March 1, 2018 | 1.1/5 | 5.67 | 1.1 | 4.14 | 2.2 | 9.81 |
| 13 | "Hiding Not Seeking" | March 8, 2018 | 1.2/5 | 6.24 | 1.1 | 4.34 | 2.3 | 10.62 |
| 14 | "Looking for a Lifeline" | March 22, 2018 | 1.2/5 | 6.88 | 1.0 | 3.87 | 2.2 | 10.55 |
| 15 | "The Chance to Forgive" | March 22, 2018 | 1.2/5 | 6.88 | 1.0 | 3.87 | 2.2 | 10.55 |
| 16 | "The One that Matters the Most" | March 29, 2018 | 1.0/4 | 5.42 | 1.1 | 4.12 | 2.1 | 9.54 |
| 17 | "Put White on Me" | April 5, 2018 | 1.0/4 | 5.48 | 1.1 | 4.11 | 2.1 | 9.59 |
| 18 | "When They See Us Coming" | April 12, 2018 | 1.0/4 | 5.64 | 1.0 | 4.12 | 2.0 | 9.76 |
| 19 | "Where I Want to Be" | April 19, 2018 | 1.0/4 | 5.39 | 0.9 | 4.12 | 1.9 | 9.51 |
| 20 | "The Strongest Among Us" | April 26, 2018 | 0.9/4 | 5.55 | 1.0 | 3.97 | 1.9 | 9.52 |
| 21 | "The Unrivaled Standard" | May 3, 2018 | 1.0/4 | 5.54 | 1.0 | 3.94 | 2.0 | 9.49 |
| 22 | "One for the Ages" | May 10, 2018 | 1.0/4 | 5.95 | 0.9 | 3.67 | 1.9 | 9.62 |
| 23 | "The Grand Gesture" | May 10, 2018 | 1.0/4 | 5.95 | 0.9 | 3.67 | 1.9 | 9.62 |

^1 Live +7 ratings were not available, so Live +3 ratings have been used instead.

== Home media ==
The DVD release of season six was released in Region 1 on August 28, 2018.

The Complete Sixth Season
| Set details | | | Special features |
| 23 episodes; 936 minutes (Region 1); 6-disc set; 1.78:1 aspect ratio; Languages: English (Dolby Digital 5.1); Subtitles: English (Region 1); French European (Region 1) | | | Chicago P.D. Season 5 Crossover Episode – "Profiles" |
| Release dates | | | Chicago P.D. Season 5 Crossover Episode – "Profiles" |
| United States | United Kingdom | Australia | Chicago P.D. Season 5 Crossover Episode – "Profiles" |
| August 28, 2018 | | | Chicago P.D. Season 5 Crossover Episode – "Profiles" |
