= Kill for Me =

2013 American thriller film

- DVD cover
- Directed by: Michael Greenspan
- Written by: Christopher Dodd; Michael Greenspan; Christian Forte
- Produced by: Kyle Mann
- Starring: Katie Cassidy; Tracy Spiridakos
- Cinematography: James Liston
- Edited by: Mark Shearer
- Music by: Michael Brook
- Production company: Independent Edge Films
- Distributed by: Sony Pictures Home Entertainment
- Release date: February 12, 2013
- Running time: 95 minutes
- Country: United States
- Language: English

Kill for Me is a 2013 American thriller film directed by Michael Greenspan and starring Katie Cassidy and Tracy Spiridakos. The film was released direct-to-video on February 12, 2013.

== Plot ==
Amanda has a violent ex-boyfriend, Cameron. After her roommate Natalie goes missing, Hayley moves in. When Cameron threatens Amanda, Hayley kills him, and they bury his body. In return for helping her, Hayley asks Amanda to assist in getting rid of her abusive father, Garrett.

== Cast ==
- Katie Cassidy as Amanda Rowe
- Tracy Spiridakos as Hayley Jones
- Donal Logue as Garrett Jones
- Adam DiMarco as Mark
- Shannon Chan-Kent as Zoe
- Torrance Coombs as Cameron
- Chelah Horsdal as Maria Klein
- Ryan Robbins as Detective Ferris
- Colin Lawrence as Detective Howe
- Leah Gibson as Natalie Ross
- Andrew Zachar as Steve
- Graham Croft as Vet
- Joanne Wilson as Newscaster
- Crystal Mudry as Girl Outside Bar

== Reception ==
Ali Davis of AfterEllen said about the film: "Kill for Me is a rainy-day thriller. It's not something you need to alter your life to seek out, but it sure beats getting out of your pajamas on a day when you really don't have to."

Love Horror gave the film two stars out of five, stating: "Drawing from several sources such as Strangers on a Train and Single White Female to name a few, Kill For Me is a twisted tale with a[sic] interesting story that deals with the cycle of abuse and the difficulties people have breaking free".

Ken Tasho of EDGE Media Network wrote: "As per usual, the lesbianism in "Kill for Me" is downplayed and the love affair between Amanda and Hailey is minimal. But the sight of the two female leads dragging dead bodies and playing with guns is outlandish, if not laughable."
