= Wrecked (2010 film) =

- Theatrical release poster
- Directed by: Michael Greenspan
- Written by: Christopher Dodd
- Produced by: Kyle Mann; Adrien Brody
- Starring: Adrien Brody; Caroline Dhavernas; Ryan Robbins
- Cinematography: James Liston
- Edited by: Wiebke von Carolsfeld
- Music by: Michael Brook
- Production companies: Independent Edge Films; Telefilm Canada; Three-Seven Entertainment; Wrecked Productions
- Distributed by: Alliance Films
- Release date: October 15, 2010
- Running time: 91 minutes
- Country: Canada
- Language: English
- Box office: $8,020

Wrecked is a 2010 Canadian thriller film, directed by Michael Greenspan, written by Christopher Dodd, produced by Kyle Mann and starring Adrien Brody. It was released by IFC Midnight Films on April 1, 2011.

== Plot ==
A "Man" wakes up, severely injured, in a wrecked car near the bottom of a steep ravine. His right leg is broken and stuck between the dashboard and the door, and he is suffering from amnesia. Two other passengers are dead nearby. The Man hallucinates about a "Woman" finding him.

The Man scares off a cougar by firing two shots from a revolver he finds inside the car. He hears on the car radio about an armed robbery by a man named Raymond Plazzy. Finding a credit card under the passenger seat in the name of Raymond Plazzy, the Man assumes that he is Plazzy. After a few days, he finally manages to pry his leg free.

The Man splints his leg and crawls around the car. He finds bags of money in the trunk. When he starts to crawl up the hill, a man emerges from the woods and starts to loot the car. The Man tries to stop the woodsman, who just aims his gun at him before he runs away with some of the stolen money. A Belgian Shepherd dog appears, and the Man follows it into the woods. He finds a working cell phone inside a cave, discovering the body of the woodsman, who appears to have been attacked by the cougar. The Man cannot obtain a cell signal.

Frequently hallucinating about the Woman, he finally shoots her with the revolver after realizing the hallucinations have led him back to the car. He then becomes determined to get out of the ravine. After crawling for days, he finds a road and a dead body with a matching photo ID card that says Raymond Plazzy. He then remembers what happened to him: he was running errands with his wife (the Woman) when he witnessed an armed bank robbery, where a security guard is shot and the Man is taken hostage by Plazzy. In the present, the cougar appears and the Man kicks Plazzy's corpse toward the cougar, which drags it away. The Man now has a cell phone signal and calls for help.

The Man is picked up by a park ranger. When getting in the truck, he asks about the dog, but it is nowhere to be seen. When he clicks his seat belt on, it triggers a memory of putting on his seatbelt while Plazzy and his two fellow robbers were arguing, with Plazzy holding a gun to the Man's head. The Man uses their distraction to grab the wheel, causing the car to crash. The scene returns to the rescued man in the park ranger's car, and the scene blacks out.

== Cast ==
- Adrien Brody as Man
- Caroline Dhavernas as Woman
- Ryan Robbins as George Weaver, Plazzy's accomplice
- Adrian Hughes as Raymond Plazzy
- Adrian Holmes as Man in the Woods
- Lloyd Adams as Eric Stapleton, Plazzy's getaway driver
- Mark McConchie as Security Guard
- Jacob Blair as Park Ranger

== Production ==
At the film's global premiere, which took place on October 15, 2010, at Emirates Palace as part of the Abu Dhabi Film Festival, Adrien Brody spoke candidly about why he chose to work on a project with a novice feature film director: "I believed that Michael had the ability to make something special. And I had a blueprint to work with from the script, and in the conversations that Michael and I had. You can't just make safe bets. Even directors and actors who do great work, do not always do great work. And I don't feel like you can wait around until someone of note comes to you and says come work with me. You have to seek out new things that inspire you. The key to this working is that he really didn't have to babysit me. You have to have trust in each other, and I trust Michael."

== Reception ==
Wrecked received mixed to favorable reviews from film critics. Rotten Tomatoes rates the film 48% with an average score of 5.3 out of 10, based on 27 reviews. Metacritic, which uses a weighted score, gives the film a score of 61 out of 100, indicating "generally favorable reviews", based on 10 reviews.

Writing for IndieWire and giving it a "B" grade, Eric Kohn calls Adrien Brody's performance "committed" and Michael Greenspan's debut "has the stable definition of a one-act play" but finds the film "falls apart when it starts to repeat itself", but that "Brody's engagement with the material prevents "Wrecked" from falling apart." Kirk Honeycutt of The Hollywood Reporter calls the film "never less than gripping", saying it "builds tension steadily", "is visually inventive", not tedious, and yet "comes up a bit flat with a perfunctory ending where something more feral or dramatic is needed."

Contrastingly, Brad Brevett of ComingSoon describes the conclusion as "interesting", but complains of the film going in circles too much of the time, arguing that the story is too small for a feature film, while conceding that Adrien Brody gives "a solid performance, despite having very little to work with." Alex DiVicenzo concurs: "Christopher Dodd's script would have benefited from a few more twists and turns; something that puts the man in peril but remains grounded in reality to avoid taking the viewer out of the movie. Director Michael Greenspan does the best that he can with what he has, aided in no small part by the fine cinematography by James Liston." In a very brief New York Times review, Jeannette Catsoulis also complains that the film moves slowly at first and lacks suspense.
