= Goblin (film) =

2010 Canadian film

- Written by: Raul Inglis
- Directed by: Jeffery Scott Lando
- Starring: Gil Bellows; Tracy Spiridakos; Camille Sullivan; Donnelly Rhodes; Reilly Dolman; Andrew Wheeler; Colin Cunningham; Erin Boyes; Jordan Moore; Brett Dier
- Theme music composer: Christopher Nickel
- Country of origin: Canada
- Original language: English

Production
- Producer: John Prince
- Cinematography: Tom Harting
- Editors: Jamie Alain; Jeffery Scott Lando
- Running time: 100 minutes
- Production companies: Syfy; Reel One Pictures; CineTel Films; Gobi Productions

Original release
- Network: Syfy
- Release: July 17, 2010

Goblin is a 2010 television film directed by Jeffery Scott Lando and written by Raul Inglis. The movie was released on the Syfy channel on July 7, 2010. Filming for Goblin took place in Pitt Meadows, British Columbia, Canada.

== Plot ==
In 1831 a hamlet holds a yearly ritual to cleanse their home of anything they view as unclean. As a result, the deformed infant of a witch is thrown into a bonfire, which enrages her. She curses the town, saying that every Halloween a goblin will come to the town and try to take its children. Anyone attempting to stand in its way will be killed brutally.

Years later in modern day, Neil Perkins (Gil Bellows) travels to the hamlet (now called Hollowglen) with the intent of developing the town. With him are his wife Kate (Camille Sullivan), their two children, teenager Nikki (Tracy Spiridakos) and the infant Nathan, as well as Nikki's best friend. They're warned of the town's curse and that as they are arriving on Halloween eve, Nathan's life is in danger. The Perkins ignore the threat, only to find themselves in mortal danger.

== Cast ==
- Gil Bellows as Neil Perkins
- Tracy Spiridakos as Nikki Perkins
- Camille Sullivan as Kate Perkins
- Donnelly Rhodes as Charlie Glover
- Reilly Dolman as Kyle Waters
- Andrew Wheeler as Sheriff Ben Milgreen
- Chilton Crane as Bea Milgreen
- Erin Boyes as Cammy
- Brett Dier as Matt
- Julia Maxwell as Jane
- Colin Cunningham as Owen
- Roy Campsall as Goblin
- Jordan Moore as Nathan Perkins
- Ryan Grantham as Ben Milgreen

== Reception ==
Critical reception for Goblin was mostly negative. Dread Central gave the film 1 1/2 blades, calling it an "entirely unfulfilling piece of strictly by-the-numbers Syfy filler". PopMatters gave a similarly themed review, stating that it should be "avoided at all costs". HorrorNews.net gave a slightly more positive review, criticizing it while also stating that it would best appeal to people who have "a certain affinity for these kinds of movies". A staff member for HorrorTalk gave an overall positive review for Goblin, calling it a "guilty pleasure".
