= Chicago Fire season 5 =

Chicago Fire
- Season 5
- Chicago Fire Season 5 DVD cover
- Showrunners: Matt Olmstead; Michael Brandt; Derek Haas
- No. of episodes: 22

Release
- Original network: NBC
- Original release: October 11, 2016 – May 16, 2017

Season chronology
- ← Previous; Season 4 Next → Season 6

The fifth season of Chicago Fire, an American drama television series with executive producer Dick Wolf, and producers Derek Haas, Michael Brandt, and Matt Olmstead, was ordered on November 9, 2015, by NBC. The eighth episode "One Hundred" is the show's 100th episode and served as the fall finale. The season premiered on October 11, 2016 and contained 22 episodes. The season concluded on May 16, 2017.

== Overview ==
The show follows the lives of the firefighters and paramedics working at the Chicago Fire Department at the firehouse of Engine 51, Truck 81, Squad 3, Ambulance 61 and Battalion 25.

== Cast and characters ==
=== Main cast ===
- Jesse Spencer as Lieutenant Matthew Casey, Truck 81
- Taylor Kinney as Lieutenant Kelly Severide, Squad 3
- Monica Raymund as Firefighter/Paramedic Gabriela Dawson, Truck 81/Ambulance 61
- Kara Killmer as Paramedic in Charge Sylvie Brett, Ambulance 61
- David Eigenberg as Firefighter Christopher Herrmann, Truck 81
- Yuri Sardarov as Firefighter Brian "Otis" Zvonecek, Truck 81
- Joe Minoso as Firefighter Joe Cruz, Squad 3
- Christian Stolte as Firefighter Randy "Mouch" McHolland, Truck 81
- Miranda Rae Mayo as Firefighter Stella Kidd, Truck 81
- Steven R. McQueen as Firefighter Candidate/Paramedic Jimmy Borelli, Truck 81/ Ambulance 61 (Episodes 1–2)
- Eamonn Walker as Chief Wallace Boden, Battalion 25

=== Recurring ===
- Randy Flagler as Firefighter Harold Capp, Rescue Squad 3
- Anthony Ferraris as Firefighter Tony Ferraris, Rescue Squad 3
- DuShon Brown as Connie
- Robyn Coffin as Cindy Herrmann
- Kamal Angelo Bolden as Firefighter Jason Kannell, Squad 6/Squad 3
- Jeff Hephner as Jeff Clarke
- Melissa Ponzio as Donna Robbins-Boden
- Gordon Clapp as Chaplain William Orlovsky
- Daniel Zacapa as Ramón Dawson
- Charlotte Sullivan as Anna Turner
- Nick Boraine as Dennis Mack, District Chief with the City of Springfield FD
- Scott Elrod as Travis Brenner
- Lauren Stamile as Susan Weller
- Holly Robinson Peete as Tamara Jones, School Teacher.
- Alex Weisman as Paramedic Allen "Chatty" Chout
- Mia Hulen as Marcy Prescott
- Deanna Reed-Foster as Tina Cantrell, DCFS Social Worker

=== Guest ===
- Treat Williams as Retired Battalion Chief Benjamin "Benny" Severide (episode 18)

=== Crossover ===
- Jon Seda as Detective Antonio Dawson
- Jason Beghe as Sergeant Hank Voight
- Sophia Bush as Detective Erin Lindsay
- Jesse Lee Soffer as Detective Jay Halstead
- Marina Squerciati as Officer Kim Burgess
- Elias Koteas as Detective Alvin Olinsky
- Li Jun Li as Officer Julie Tay
- Barbara Eve Harris as Commander Emma Crowley
- Oliver Platt as Dr. Daniel Charles
- S. Epatha Merkerson as Sharon Goodwin
- Nick Gehlfuss as Dr. Will Halstead
- Torrey DeVitto as Dr. Natalie Manning
- Yaya DaCosta as April Sexton
- Rachel DiPillo as Dr. Sarah Reese
- Brian Tee as Dr. Ethan Choi
- Marlyne Barrett as Maggie Lockwood
- Carl Weathers as State's Attorney Mark Jefferies
- Amy Morton as Sergeant Trudy Platt
- America Olivo as Laura Dawson
- Zach Garcia as Diego Dawson
- Alina Taber as Lexi Olinsky

== Episodes ==
No. overall	No. in season	Title	Directed by	Written by	Original release date	Prod. code	U.S. viewers (millions)
93	1	"The Hose or the Animal"	Joe Chappelle	Michael Brandt & Derek Haas	October 11, 2016	501	7.52
Dawson and Casey are back together after she has Louie. After spending the night with Severide, Stella finds out that her unstable ex-husband Grant has escaped from psychiatric hold and is after her and Severide. Borelli files a grievance against Boden questioning his leadership following his brother's death. Thinking of her future now that she has Louie, Dawson returns to Ambulance 61 following Borelli's suspension. Also, Brett discovers Mouch is writing erotic fiction and agrees to help him out. She also receives some unexpected attention from Antonio Dawson (Jon Seda) following a call.
94	2	"A Real Wake-Up Call"	Reza Tabrizi	Andrea Newman & Michael Gilvary	October 18, 2016	502	7.40
Following Grant's attack on Stella and Severide, he is charged with attempted murder and placed back in psychiatric hold leading Stella to not press charges which infuriates Severide. Later on, Stella makes a difficult decision. Meanwhile, after a falling out at Molly's, tensions grow worse with Jimmy when Herrmann, Mouch, Otis, and Kidd refuse to work with him because his grief was affecting his attitude and they believed he was not mentally ready. Mouch and Brett continue to pursue writing an erotic book. Also, Casey finds himself in a tough spot after an alderman who had discovered the favor that lead to Dawson fostering Louie and uses it as leverage. Later on, the firehouse responds to an accident and despite orders to stand back, Borelli walks towards the fire and gets burned and severely injured in the fiery flames. He is taken to Chicago Med and it is determined that he can no longer be a firefighter.: This is the final appearance of Steven R. McQueen as Jimmy Borelli.
95	3	"Scorched Earth"	Joe Chappelle	Sarah Kucserka & Veronica West	October 25, 2016	503	6.93
Casey continues to pursue information into who tipped off the aldermen about Louie, after he learns that DCFS wants to put Louie in another foster home. He seeks help from his consultant Susan Weller, but later finds out she was the one who told the alderman. Meanwhile, Stella helps out a child with hepatitis C who stole medication following a call. Severide continues to hang out with local celebrity Travis Brenner (guest star Scott Elrod). Also, Brett continues to pursue Antonio Dawson.: Guest appearances by S. Epatha Merkerson as Sharon Goodwin from Chicago Med, and Carl Weathers as State's Attorney Mark Jefferies from Chicago Justice.
96	4	"Nobody Else is Dying Today"	Sanford Bookstaver	Jill Weinberger	November 1, 2016	504	6.65
While acting as alderman, Casey investigates a warehouse, which takes a dramatic turn when an acid spill occurs and he does everything in his power to prevent a major disaster. Meanwhile, Dawson and Brett tend to an elderly woman who had a seizure and they deal with a demanding advocate in which hospital to bring her to. Brett and Mouch run into trouble when publishing their erotic novel. Also, Otis and Cruz pull pranks on each other.
97	5	"I Held Her Hand"	Reza Tabrizi	Roger Grant	November 15, 2016	505	6.99
Tensions rise when Severide and Casey disagree on whether an apartment fire that killed a woman was accidental or arson murder. Meanwhile, Mouch and Brett get their novel published but it is later shot down when the Chief of department finds out and are forced to choose their novel or their job. Casey continues to suspect the dead woman's husband after learning from her sister that she and her husband fought constantly. Herrmann investigates into who is vandalizing 51 with graffiti. Also, Dawson and Brett respond to a call when a kid fell out of a tree to propose homecoming to his girlfriend.
98	6	"That Day"	Dan Lerner	Michael A. O'Shea	November 22, 2016	506	6.48
While on the way to a call, Dawson accidentally hits a pedestrian with the ambulance which leads to the victim's son suing CFD and Dawson. Meanwhile, Casey and Severide continue to investigate the fire from the last call and it is revealed that the husband set it by a remote Internet device. Herrmann considers a promotion to lieutenant and Casey shadows him. Boden considers taking a trip to New York while his stepson is visiting. Also, Brett takes her relationship with Antonio to the next level. Boden recalls his participation in rescue efforts the day after 9/11 and goes to New York after all.
99	7	"Lift Each Other"	Alex Chapple	Liz Alper & Ally Seibert	November 29, 2016	507	7.94
Casey begins to get down on himself following a last call giving CPR to a child, surviving then dying days later. Cruz comes to Severide about Boden's stepson James and suspects abuse. Meanwhile, Dawson and Antonio's parents celebrate their wedding anniversary but later announce that they are divorcing. Herrmann recruits Stella and Otis into sponsoring a tough mudding competition to help promote Molly's. Boden confronts his former wife's new boyfriend—whom he confirmed abused his stepson—and faces department consequences for defending his stepson. Dawson learns Casey kept his grief over the dying boy quiet so as not to disrupt her family's party.
100	8	"One Hundred"	Joe Chappelle	Michael Brandt & Derek Haas	December 6, 2016	508	7.77
Severide seeks treatment for a neck injury following a call and runs into former firefighter turned medical student Jeff Clarke (guest star Jeff Hephner) who asks him for a bone marrow transplant for another patient. Meanwhile, Dawson and Casey run into a hurdle when trying to adopt Louie permanently and later on they get married. Also, Otis comes up with an idea to celebrate the 100th anniversary of Molly's.
101	9	"Some Make It, Some Don't"	Drucilla Carlson	Andrea Newman	January 3, 2017	509	7.62
Louis' biological father confronts Casey and Dawson and demands custody of Louie. Casey and Dawson fight for custody. Meanwhile, 51 finds a ping-pong table and begin tournaments inside the firehouse. Severide finds out he is a match for a patient for a bone marrow transplant; however, complications ensue and he begins going to his old ways of drinking. Later on, 51 responds to a hit-and-run accident involving Severide's car with no driver. This episode begins a crossover with Chicago P.D. which concludes on "Don't Bury This Case". It is included on the Chicago P.D. Season 4 DVD set.
102	10	"The People We Meet"	David Rodriguez	Sarah Kucserka & Veronica West	January 17, 2017	510	7.15
Severide is informed that the bone marrow transplant patient is eligible again, but complications arise when Severide is injured after being thrown out of a window during a call. He is unable to donate because he cannot have an epidural for his donation but, despite the complications, forces the donation anyway. Meanwhile, Louie's father fights for full custody of him but Dawson and Casey try to fight back. But after seeing the amount of support on the father's side, Casey and Dawson were left with no choice but to give up Louie. Also, Mouch and Otis create a video encouraging people to join the CFD.
103	11	"Who Lives and Who Dies"	Haze J. F. Bergeron III	Michael Gilvary	January 24, 2017	511	7.38
Following Louie's departure, Dawson's emotions get the better of her at a call involving a woman who did not know she was pregnant; the woman's father loses his temper. Casey's attitude is on the edge and he takes it out at 51. Casey makes a last minute decision following a call to save two victims and one goes missing. Meanwhile, Severide is forced to decide whether to stay with Anna or Stella.
104	12	"An Agent of the Machine"	Jann Turner	Jill Weinberger	February 7, 2017	512	6.87
Following the last call, 51 is put on high alert when the criminal escapes and returns to kill Casey and target 51. The CPD steps in to find and capture him. Meanwhile, Brett's and Antonio's relationship hits a low when Antonio's ex-wife shows up, which prompts Brett to question if Antonio is ready to be in a relationship. Also, Casey considers giving the engagement ring to Dawson as a present and a friend of Severide's father comes to 51 and shadows him.
105	13	"Trading in Scuttlebutt"	Reza Tabrizi	Roger Grant	February 14, 2017	513	6.77
Tensions run high at a call when another house shows up first and Boden makes a life-saving decision that doesn't sit well with another Chief on scene, Anderson, who had just received a promotion. Fearing his reputation had been damaged, Chief Anderson makes things miserable at 51—especially after provoking but being shown up by Boden at a department party. Severide makes a decision whether to leave Chicago and become a Battalion Chief in Springfield—where Anna lives. Also, Dawson tries to find a date for Brett following her break up. Hermann leads a 51 team in an appearance at his sons school.
106	14	"Purgatory"	Joe Chappelle	Michael Brandt & Derek Haas	February 21, 2017	514	7.16
Chief Anderson has reassigned most of the members to different fire houses, with only Dawson, Casey and Severide left behind. Stella and Brett are reassigned to the house where Stella formerly worked, uncomfortably. Cruz and Capp are re-assigned to the 9-1-1- call center. Boden tries unsuccessfully to appeal the reassignments as Anderson has the power to reassign staff as he sees fit. Severide tries to dig up dirt on Anderson while members try to adjust to their new locations, while he still struggles with a decision to take the Springfield job and his feelings about Anna.
107	15	"Deathtrap"	Joe Chappelle	Andrea Newman	March 1, 2017	515	9.01
51 responds to an out of control warehouse fire with dozens of victims inside. The team races against time to try and save them all. One of the victims is Alvin Olinsky's (guest star Elias Koteas) daughter Lexi who was found in critical condition. Later on, 51 joins forces with Hank Voight (guest star Jason Beghe) and the police department when they discover that the fire was intentionally set. Also, Severide tries to get in contact with Anna. This episode begins a crossover with Chicago P.D. and Chicago Justice that continues on "Emotional Proximity" and concludes on "Fake." It is included on the Chicago P.D. Season 4 and Chicago Justice Season 1 DVD sets.
108	16	"Telling Her Goodbye"	Reza Tabrizi	Michael A. O'Shea	March 21, 2017	516	7.21
Firehouse 51 is put into a hostage situation when a group of gang members run into 51 to take refuge when dealing with an escalating gang retaliation. One of their members is seriously injured and Stella is forced to tend him because Dawson and Brett are on a call. Severide does everything he can to stay hidden and figure out a plan.
109	17	"Babies and Fools"	Holly Dale	Michael Gilvary & Liz Alper & Ally Seibert	March 28, 2017	517	6.68
After an accident in which a lump of concrete smashes through the windscreen of a car resulting in a rollover, Dawson pushes for further action, which escalates after the same individual saves occupants of another vehicle on the same day. Casey tries to help one of his constituents who wants a noisy construction site next to his house silenced. Meanwhile, Severide does everything he can to make Anna feel welcome in Chicago.
110	18	"Take a Knee"	Joe Chappelle	Michael Brandt & Derek Haas	April 4, 2017	518	6.29
Casey discovers a new crack house on the way to the firehouse and goes to great lengths to close it down when he discovers a helpless victim is involved. Meanwhile, Severide's father Benny (guest star Treat Williams) returns to Chicago and meets Anna. Also, Dawson and Brett are dealt with a new trainee and Hermann loses his temper when he finds out that his son, Lee Henry was suspended from School after he refused to stand for the Pledge of Allegiance because he didn't like how the school raised their vending machine prices.
111	19	"Carry Their Legacy"	Reza Tabrizi	Michael A. O'Shea	April 25, 2017	519	6.91
Casey reunites with an old friend who is assigned as a temporary Squad replacement as Severide's truck has broken. While at a call, Casey makes a big decision. Meanwhile, Severide makes strides in figuring out why Anna abruptly left, Dawson and Brett are forced to be retrained as EMT's following an incident. Also, Connie returns to work and the members on truck makes bets to see how long her temporary replacement will last.
112	20	"Carry Me"	Eric Laneuville	Jill Weinberger	May 2, 2017	520	6.08
With support from Boden, Casey goes out of his way to help one of his fellow firefighters who is taking the blame for the loss of his team. Meanwhile, Severide continues to be by Anna's side when her health continues to deteriorate, at the same time responding to a call of an elderly woman refusing to leave her burned out home. Also, Otis and Cruz look for a roommate for their apartment.
113	21	"Sixty Days"	Sanford Bookstaver	Michael Gilvary	May 9, 2017	521	5.92
Cruz faces disciplinary action when trying to escort a drunk out of a bar when he discovers that Cruz has a tattoo with the CFD logo. Meanwhile, Casey goes head to head with another Alderman when trying to pass a bill for First Responders. Members of Firehouse 51 help Severide grieve the loss of Anna and Dawson's father makes a visit to the firehouse. Also, Squad 3 welcomes its newest member Jason Kannell (Guest star Kamal Angelo Bolden).
114	22	"My Miracle"	Michael Brandt	Michael Brandt & Derek Haas	May 16, 2017	522	6.30
After Cruz receives a 60 day unpaid suspension, tensions grow worse for Mouch and Cruz. Meanwhile, Casey continues to fight for his first responders bill, but faces more setbacks—including his troubled father-in-law's interference—and he makes an important decision about his future. At the same time, he clashes with Dawson as her father continues to stay at their apartment longer than first thought. Herrmann goes the extra mile to make an injured child smile. At the end of the episode, the firefighters find themselves trapped in a warehouse fire. Herrmann desperately tries to save Mouch who's suffering a heart attack in the middle of the blaze, and a trapped Casey takes off the mask and says goodbye to Dawson knowing he will not get out alive. Cruz and Dawson wait outside and break down as the team tries desperately to get out. Special guest appearances: Chicago Cubs players Kris Bryant, David Ross, and Jake Arrieta, and sportscaster Mike Tirico.

== Ratings ==
Viewership and ratings per episode of Chicago Fire season 5
No.	Title	Air date	Rating/share (18–49)	Viewers (millions)	DVR (18–49)	DVR viewers (millions)	Total (18–49)	Total viewers (millions)
1	"The Hose or the Animal"	October 11, 2016	1.8/7	7.52	1.1	3.89	2.9	11.41
2	"A Real Wake-Up Call"	October 18, 2016	1.6/6	7.40	1.2	3.89	2.8	11.29
3	"Scorched Earth"	October 25, 2016	1.6/6	6.93	0.9	3.58	2.5	10.51
4	"Nobody Else is Dying Today"	November 1, 2016	1.5/5	6.65	0.9	3.43	2.4	10.08
5	"I Held Her Hand"	November 15, 2016	1.5/6	6.99	1.0	3.68	2.5	10.68
6	"That Day"	November 22, 2016	1.5/5	6.48	1.1	4.11	2.6	10.58
7	"Lift Each Other"	November 29, 2016	1.7/7	7.94	1.0	3.73	2.7	11.67
8	"One Hundred"	December 6, 2016	1.7/6	7.77	1.0	3.93	2.7	11.71
9	"Some Make It, Some Don't"	January 3, 2017	1.6/5	7.62	0.8	2.94	2.4	10.56
10	"The People We Meet"	January 17, 2017	1.6/6	7.15	1.0	3.79	2.6	10.94
11	"Who Lives and Who Dies"	January 24, 2017	1.8/7	7.38	0.9	3.76	2.7	11.14
12	"An Agent of the Machine"	February 7, 2017	1.5/5	6.87	1.0	3.83	2.5	10.70
13	"Trading in Scuttlebutt"	February 14, 2017	1.5/6	6.77	1.0	3.80	2.5	10.57
14	"Purgatory"	February 21, 2017	1.6/6	7.16	0.9	3.80	2.5	10.96
15	"Deathtrap"	March 1, 2017	1.7/7	9.01	—	—	—	—
16	"Telling Her Goodbye"	March 21, 2017	1.5/6	7.21	1.0	3.50	2.5	10.71
17	"Babies and Fools"	March 28, 2017	1.4/5	6.68	0.9	3.71	2.3	10.37
18	"Take a Knee"	April 4, 2017	1.3/5	6.29	0.9	3.49	2.2	9.78
19	"Carry Their Legacy"	April 25, 2017	1.3/5	6.91	—	—	—	—
20	"Carry Me"	May 2, 2017	1.2/5	6.08	0.9	3.67	2.1	9.75
21	"Sixty Days"	May 9, 2017	1.2/5	5.92	1.0	3.70	2.2	9.62
22	"My Miracle"	May 16, 2017	1.3/5	6.30	1.0	3.88	2.3	10.14

== Home media ==
The DVD release of season five was released in Region 1 on August 29, 2017.

The Complete Fifth Season
Set details			Special features
22 episodes; 917 minutes (Region 1); 6-disc set; 1.78:1 aspect ratio; Languages: English (Dolby Digital 5.1); Brazilian Portuguese (Dolby Digital 5.1); Latin American Spanish (Dolby Digital 5.1); Subtitles: English (Region 1); Brazilian Portuguese (Region 1); French European (Region 1); Latin American Spanish (Region 1)			Chicago P.D. Season 4 Crossover Episodes; "Don't Bury This Case"; "Emotional Proximity"; Chicago Justice Season 1 Crossover Episode – "Fake"
Release dates			Chicago P.D. Season 4 Crossover Episodes; "Don't Bury This Case"; "Emotional Proximity"; Chicago Justice Season 1 Crossover Episode – "Fake"
United States	United Kingdom	Australia	Chicago P.D. Season 4 Crossover Episodes; "Don't Bury This Case"; "Emotional Proximity"; Chicago Justice Season 1 Crossover Episode – "Fake"
August 29, 2017			Chicago P.D. Season 4 Crossover Episodes; "Don't Bury This Case"; "Emotional Proximity"; Chicago Justice Season 1 Crossover Episode – "Fake"
