= Tracy Spiridakos =

Canadian actress

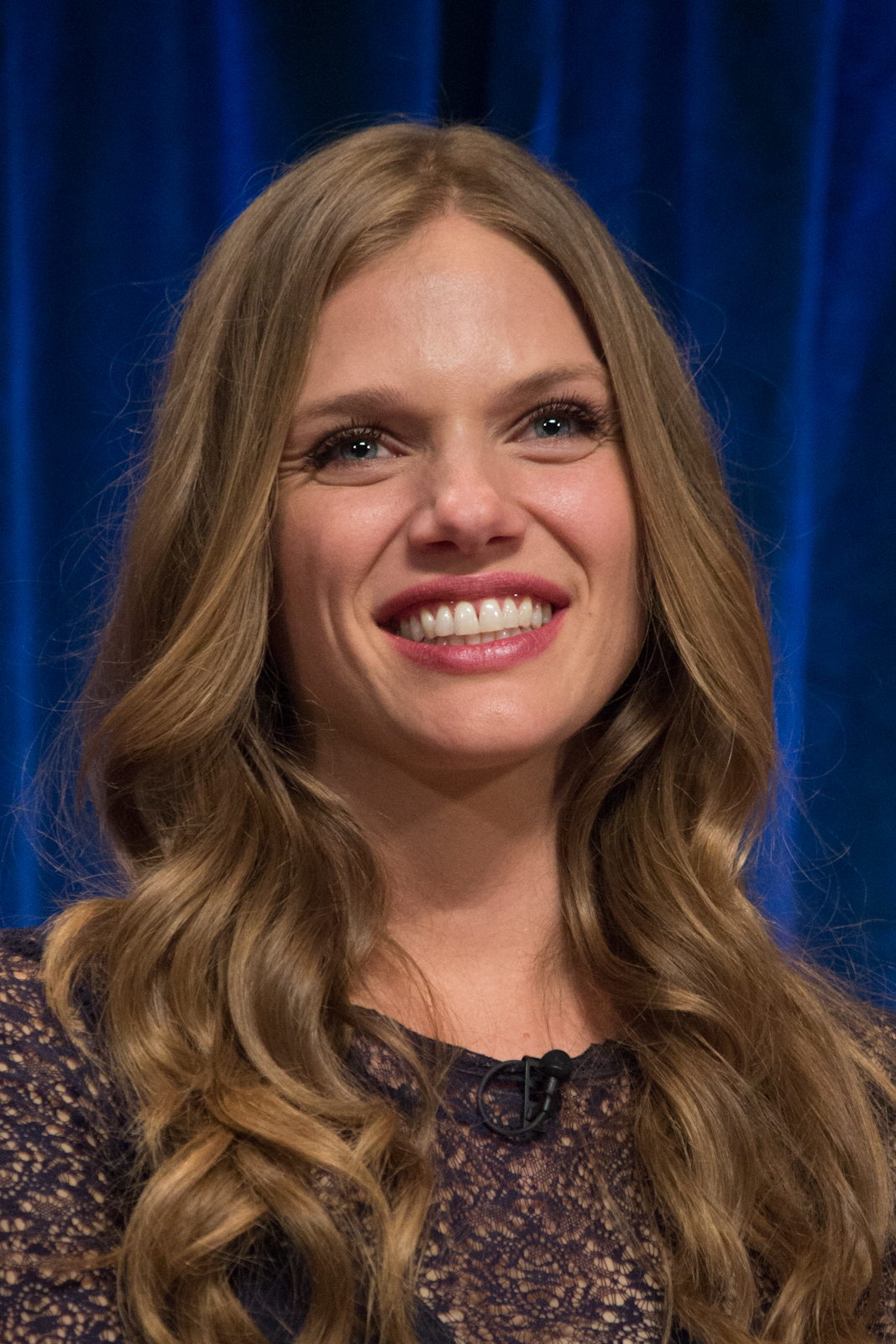
- Spiridakos at PaleyFest 2013
- Born: Panagiota Spiridakos; Winnipeg, Manitoba, Canada
- Other name: Patricia Spiridakos
- Occupation: Actress
- Years active: 2007–present

Panagiota Spiridakos (Greek: Παναγιώτα Σπυριδάκου), known professionally as Tracy Spiridakos (Greek: Τρέισι Σπυριδάκος), is a Canadian actress. She starred as Becky Richards on the Teletoon children's comedy series Majority Rules! from 2009 to 2010. She then starred as Charlotte "Charlie" Matheson on the NBC post-apocalyptic science fiction series Revolution from 2012 to 2014, for which she was nominated for a Saturn Award for Best Actress on Television. She played Annika Johnson on the A&E television drama Bates Motel. From 2017 to 2024, Spiridakos starred on the NBC police drama Chicago P.D. playing the role of Detective Hailey Upton. Starting in 2026, she starred as the titular character on the Anna Pigeon crime drama.

== Early life ==
Spiridakos was born in Winnipeg, Manitoba, to Greek-born parents, restaurant owners George and Anastasia Spiridakos. (Note: Her father was from a village called Grammousa north of Skala, and her mother is from Athens. George Spiridakos died on August 10, 2013; he was 62.) She has two brothers. The family moved to her father's hometown, Skala, south of Sparta, a few years after she was born, and returned to Canada in 1992. (Note: She moved to Skala with her family when she was four years old, then came back to Canada at age nine.) She strongly identifies with her Greek heritage and speaks fluent Greek. Spiridakos began acting in junior high school, and studied at the Actors Training Centre of Manitoba. She graduated from Oak Park High School in Winnipeg in 2000.

== Career ==
Spiridakos moved to Vancouver in 2007 to pursue acting, and within weeks landed her first television role, a small part on Supernatural. She continued working in television, with walk-on roles on Bionic Woman, The L Word, Hellcats, and Psych. Spiridakos appeared in the TV movie Goblin, and the web series Mortal Kombat: Legacy. She also had a recurring role on Being Human as werewolf Brynn McLean.

In 2009, she won her first starring role in the Canadian Teletoon series Majority Rules!, playing 15-year-old Becky Richards. She made her feature film debut in 2011 with Rise of the Planet of the Apes, and filmed the low-budget Michael Greenspan-helmed thriller, Kill for Me, starring across from Donal Logue and Katie Cassidy. Spiridakos appeared as Sammi in the 2012 Nickelodeon original movie, Rags. She then landed a lead role on the NBC television series Revolution as Charlotte "Charlie" Matheson, a survivalist in a dystopian future civilization. She auditioned for the role while attending her first pilot season in Los Angeles. Spiridakos shot the pilot in Atlanta, and filmed the first season in Wilmington, North Carolina. She was nominated for a Saturn Award for Best Actress on Television for her performance in the first season, losing out to Fringe's Anna Torv. Production moved to Austin, Texas for the series' second season.

Spiridakos guest-starred on season 3 of the Showtime sitcom, Episodes, as Dawn, a daughter of character Morning Randolph (Mircea Monroe). In August 2014, Spiridakos helped to raise awareness of the disease ALS by participating in the Ice Bucket Challenge. Spiridakos began a recurring role on the A&E television drama, Bates Motel in 2015, playing Annika Johnson, a prostitute who arrives at the hotel at the start of the third season. She will also star opposite Jonathan Rhys Meyers in the romantic comedy Byrd & the Bees, directed by Finola Hughes. Spiridakos filmed an untitled television pilot for CBS in 2015, directed by Pamela Fryman. She stars as Holly opposite Adam Brody, playing childhood friends who reconnect later in life.

In 2017, Spiridakos appeared in the three final episodes of the fourth season of the NBC police drama series Chicago P.D., as Detective Hailey Upton, a former Robbery-Homicide detective who joins the Intelligence Unit, before being promoted to a series regular for the series' fifth season and remaining until the end of the eleventh season.

== Filmography ==
Key
†	Denotes films that have not yet been released

=== Film ===
Year	Title	Role	Notes
2011	Rise of the Planet of the Apes	Party Girl #2	
2013	Kill for Me	Hayley Jones	
TBA	Byrd and the Bees †	Rebecca Byrd	Unreleased
TBA	After †	TBA	

=== Television ===
Year	Title	Role	Notes
2007	Supernatural	Nurse	Episode: "Bedtime Stories"
2007	Bionic Woman	Annie	Episode: "The List"
2007	Aliens in America	Liz	Episode: "Church"
2008	Every Second Counts	Girl #1	Television film
2008	The Secret Lives of Second Wives	Meredith	Television film
2009	The L Word	Pretty Young Woman	Episode: "LMFAO"
2009	Web of Desire	Megan	Television film
2009–2010	Majority Rules!	Becky Richards	Main role
2010	Psych	Saralyn	Episode: "Viagra Falls"
2010	Hellcats	Ella	Episode: "Beale St. After Dark"
2010	Tower Prep	Penny Stosic	Episode: "Book Report"
2010	The Boy She Met Online	Cami Winters	Television film
2010	Goblin	Nikki Perkins	Television film
2011	Soldiers of the Apocalypse	Forty	Unsold television pilot
2011	Mortal Kombat: Legacy	Blue	Web series; episode: "Raiden"
2012	Being Human	Brynn McLean	4 episodes
2012	Rags	Sammi	Television film
2012–2014	Revolution	Charlotte "Charlie" Matheson	Main role Nominated—Saturn Award for Best Actress on Television
2014	Episodes	Dawn Randolph	Episode Six
2015	Bates Motel	Annika Johnson	Episodes: "A Death in the Family", "Persuasion", "Unbreak-Able"
2015	Untitled O’Shannon/Warren Project	Holly	Unsold television pilot
2016	Recon	Alexa	Unsold television pilot
2016	MacGyver	Nikki Carpenter	Episodes: "The Rising", "Corkscrew", "Screwdriver"
2017–2024, 2026	Chicago P.D.	Detective/ FBI Special Agent Hailey Upton	Recurring role (season 4); main role (seasons 5–11; guest role (season 13)
2018–2024, 2026	Chicago Med	Detective/ FBI Special Agent Hailey Upton	5 episodes
2018–2024, 2026	Chicago Fire	Detective/ FBI Special Agent Hailey Upton	8 episodes
2020	FBI	Detective/ FBI Special Agent Hailey Upton	Episode: "Emotional Rescue"
2026–present	Anna Pigeon	Anna Pigeon	Main role
