= Michael Greenspan =

Canadian filmmaker

- Born: Laval, Quebec, Canada
- Education: York University (BFA); American Film Institute (MFA)
- Occupations: Director, Writer, Producer

Michael Greenspan is a film director, producer and writer best known for the psychological thriller Wrecked, which debuted at the 2010 Abu Dhabi Film Festival and starred Academy Award-winning actor Adrien Brody and actress Caroline Dhavernas.

== Early life ==
Michael was born and raised in Laval, Quebec. From a young age he had a passion for theater, art and the movies. He moved to Toronto to study film and video production at York University and later moved to Los Angeles to study at the American Film Institute.

Michael began his career in Canada where his work was recognized by The National Film Board of Canada, the Academy of Canadian Cinema and Television and the Canadian Society of Cinematographers.

Michael’s films Fishtales and Lost & Found were received with critical acclaim at festivals in Los Angeles, Toronto, Montreal and Tel Aviv.

The Legend Of Razorback starring Academy Award® nominee Kevin McCarthy (Invasion of the Body Snatcher, Death Of A Salesman, Innerspace), won awards in Hollywood, Fort Lauderdale and Temecula where it won the Audience Choice Award and Houston WorldFest where it received the Eastman Kodak Scholarship Award and the Gold Special Jury Award for Best Dramatic Student Film.

Wrecked starring Academy Award® winner Adrien Brody premiered in 2010 at the Abu Dhabi Film Festival and was distributed by IFC Films. In 2012, Michael co-wrote and directed the Kill For Me starring Katie Cassidy and Donal Logue. The film was loosely based on Strangers on a Train and Single White Female, and was released in 2013.

SEAT 23B had its world premiere at the L.A. Shorts International Film Festival in July 2023.

STAR-CROSSED had its world premiere in July 2025 and has since screened at over 25 film festivals worldwide.

Michael also teaches filmmaking at The Los Angeles Film School and at Chapman University.

== Awards and honors ==
Film	Festival	Awards & Nominations	Year
Star-Crossed	Norwescon Speculative Film Fest	WINNER - Best Science Fiction film	2026
	Sci-On Film Festival	WINNER - Area 51 Award	2026
	FP Arts Short Film Festival	NOMINATED - Best Short Film	2026
	The Galactic Imaginarium Film Festival	WINNER - Best Comedy/Parody Short Film WINNER - TGIFF Award	2025
	Happy Fright Film Festival	WINNER - Best Horror/Sci-Fi	2025
	MystiCon Independent Film Festival	NOMINATED - Finalist - Best Short Film	2025
	Zed Fest Film Festival & Screenplay Competition	NOMINATED - Semi-Finalist - Best Short Film	2025
	Nashville Film Festival Pitch Competition	NOMINATED - Semi-Finalist - Best Short Film	2025
	SModcastle Film Festival FilmQuest Brooklyn SciFi Film Festival Slash and Bash Horror Sci-Fi Film Festival Anomaly - The Rochester Genre Film Festival LUSCA Fantastic Film Fest Scream Horror Film Festival, New Orleans Grand Rapids Comic Con Film Festival Miami International Science Fiction Film Festival The Minnesota Genre Film Exposition Pensacon Short Film Festival Dam Short Film Festival May 4 Sci-fi Film Festival Indy Film Fest Gasparilla International Film Festival Awesome Con Short Film Festival Origins Film Festival Panic Fest	Official Selection	2025, 2026
Seat 23B	Burbank International Film Festival	Official Selection	2024
	Beyond Hollywood International Film Festival	WINNER - Best Thriller	2024
	North Hollywood Cinefest	WINNER - Best Director NOMINATED - Best Actor NOMINATED - Best Thriller	2023
	L.A Shorts International Film Festival	Official Selection	2023
	Torino Underground Cinefest	Official Selection	2023
Wrecked	Shanghai International Film Festival	Official Selection	2011
	Whistler Film Festival	NOMINATED - Best Canadian Feature	2010
	Abu Dhabi Film Festival	Official Selection - New Horizons Competition	2010
The Legend of Razorback	Temecula Valley Film Festival	WINNER - Audience Choice Award	2003
	Fort Lauderdale International Film Festival	Official Selection	2003
	Rochester International Film Festival	WINNER - Shoestring Award	2003
	American Society of Cinematographers	NOMINATED - John F. Seitz Heritage Award for Outstanding Cinematography	2003
	Palm Springs International Festival of Short Films	Official Selection	2003
	Milwaukee International Film Festival	Official Selection	2003
	St. Louis International Film Festival	Official Selection	2003
	Newport Beach International Film Festival	Official Selection	2003
	Pacific Palisades Film Festival	Official Selection	2003
	Seh Suchte International Student Film Festival	Official Selection	2003
	Flicker Film Festival	Official Selection	2003
	Yorkton Short Film and Video Festival	NOMINATED - Best Production NOMINATED - Best Actor	2003
	International Hollywood Student Film Festival	WINNER - Best Cinematography	2003
Lost & Found	Tel Aviv International Student Film Festival	Official Selection	2000
	Canadian Society of Cinematographers	WINNER - Best Cinematography	2000
	Palm Springs International Short Film Festival Market	Official Selection	2000
	The Academy of Canadian Cinema and Television	Post-Graduate Filmmaker’s Scholarship, Apprenticeship Grant	2000
Fishtales	TVO Telefest Awards	WINNER - Best Student Short Film HONORABLE MENTION - Best Student Comedy	1999
	CANPRO	WINNER - Best Performing Arts and Entertainment Award WINNER - Best Educational Program Award	1999
	Montreal World Student Film Festival	Official Selection	1999
	National Film Board of Canada	AWARDED - Filmmaker Apprenticeship	1998

== Filmography ==
Year	Title	Role	Distributor
2025	Star-Crossed	Producer	
2024	Something Out There	Producer, Director, Editor	
2023	Seat 23B	Producer, Director, Editor	YouTube, Stash Films
2013	Kill For Me	Co-Writer, Director	Sony
2010	Wrecked	Director	IFC Films
2002	The Legend of Razorback	Director	Dark Matter Films
1999	Lost & Found	Producer, Director	
1998	Fishtales	Writer, Producer, Director	
