= LaRoyce Hawkins =

American actor (born 1988)

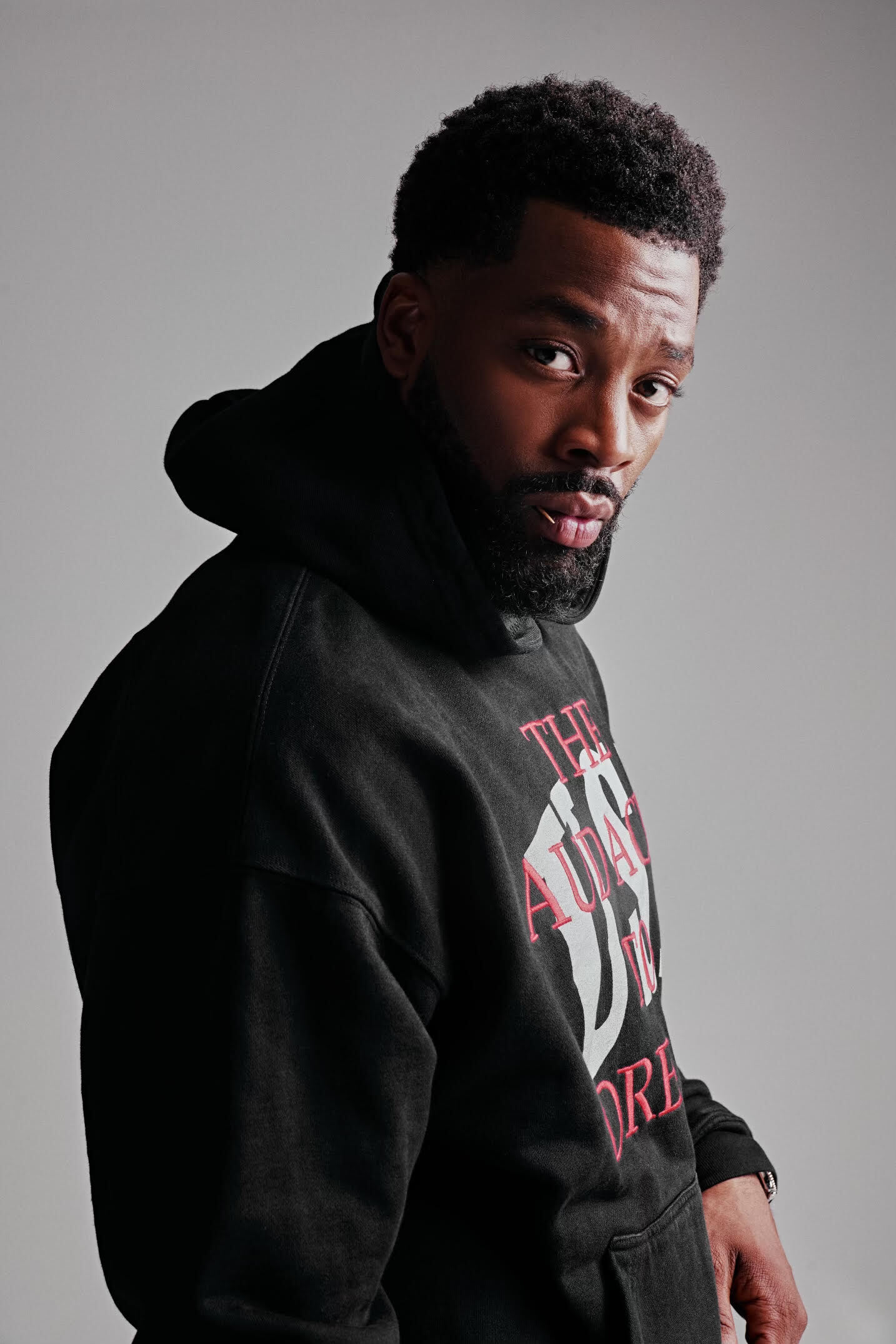
- Hawkins in 2022
- Born: May 4, 1988 (age 38); Harvey, Illinois, US
- Education: Illinois State University
- Occupations: Actor; Comedian; Poet
- Years active: 2008–present
- Children: 1

LaRoyce C. Hawkins (born May 4, 1988) is an American actor, stand-up comedian, spoken word artist, and musician. Hawkins starred on NBC's police drama Chicago P.D., where he portrayed Officer Kevin Atwater. Hawkins also has a regular role on the crossover show Chicago Fire. He left Chicago P.D. in October 2026.

== Early life and education ==
Hawkins was born and raised in Harvey, Illinois, a southern suburb of Chicago. His parents are Leah Bradley and Leonard Hawkins. While Hawkins was growing up he lived with his grandparents until he was 13 and he credits them with shaping his life and the lives of his siblings.

Hawkins attended Thornton High School, where he initially played basketball. Influenced by his grandfather's advice to "choose what makes you feel better," Hawkins left the basketball team sophomore year and joined the speech team, where he became a two-time state champion.

In 2005, Hawkins won the state title in the Illinois High School Association's Original Comedy event, also placing third at the IHSA state competition in Humorous Interpretation. In 2006, he and a partner won the state title in Humorous Duet Acting, while Hawkins also placed fourth at state that year in Original Comedy. He graduated later that year.

Hawkins attended Illinois State University on a full tuition scholastic scholarship where he majored in theatre arts. In his first college play, he starred as Toledo from the August Wilson production Ma Rainey's Black Bottom. While in college, he landed his first major motion picture role in the feature film The Express: The Ernie Davis Story, the biopic of Ernie Davis, portraying Davis' teammate Art Baker. He took a year-and-a-half off from school, returning in 2007 and graduating in 2012. He is a member of Omega Psi Phi fraternity.

== Career ==
In 2008, the same year Hawkins starred as Art Baker in The Express: The Ernie Davis Story, Hawkins appeared in Tyler Perry's House of Payne. Hawkins appeared in one episode of ABC's Detroit 1-8-7 in 2011. In 2012, he appeared in an episode of MTV's Underemployed. In 2013, Hawkins began appearing in a recurring role as Kevin Atwater in Chicago Fire. In 2014, Hawkins was cast in a main role in Chicago Fire's spin-off, Chicago P.D.. Starting in 2019, Hawkins began appearing in a recurring role in a second spin-off, Chicago Med. Hawkins has also made appearances in HBO's Ballers and TBS' Tyler Perry's House of Payne. In 2018, Hawkins appeared in Canal Street and Hope Springs Eternal. In 2019, Hawkins was cast as Kenneth Chamberlain Jr. in The Killing of Kenneth Chamberlain. Hawkins also had a recurring role as Michael "Shaw" Owens on the television show South Side from 2019–2022. In July 2026, it was announced that Hawkins would be leaving Chicago P.D., following the beginning of the show's upcoming fourteenth season.

== Personal life ==
His son, Roman John, was born April 13, 2017.

== Filmography ==
=== Film ===
Year	Title	Role	Notes
2008	The Express: The Ernie Davis Story	Art Baker	
2018	Canal Street	Amari Crawford	
2018	Hope Springs Eternal	Mr. Baser	
2019	The Killing of Kenneth Chamberlain	Kenneth Chamberlain Jr.	
2021	Hands Up	Ty Lord	
2022	North of the 10	Kyle Shaw	Streaming film

=== Television ===
Year	Title	Role	Notes
2008	Tyler Perry's House of Payne	N\A	1 episode
2011	Detroit 1-8-7	Dorcey Gamble	Episode: "Ice Man/Malibu"
2012	Underemployed	N\A	Episode: "The Gig"
2013–2026	Chicago Fire	Officer Kevin Atwater	Recurring role, 12 episodes
2014–2026	Chicago P.D.	Officer Kevin Atwater	Main role
2015	Ballers	Rodney	1 episode
2019–22	South Side	Michael 'Shaw' Owens	Recurring role
2019–2026	Chicago Med	Officer Kevin Atwater	3 episodes
2025	Ironheart	Gary Williams	Miniseries; 4 episodes
2025	Power Book IV: Force	Jojo	Episode: "Build Back Better"
2026	Toon In with Me	Himself	Episode: "The Great Purge"
