= Patrick Flueger =

American actor (born 1983)

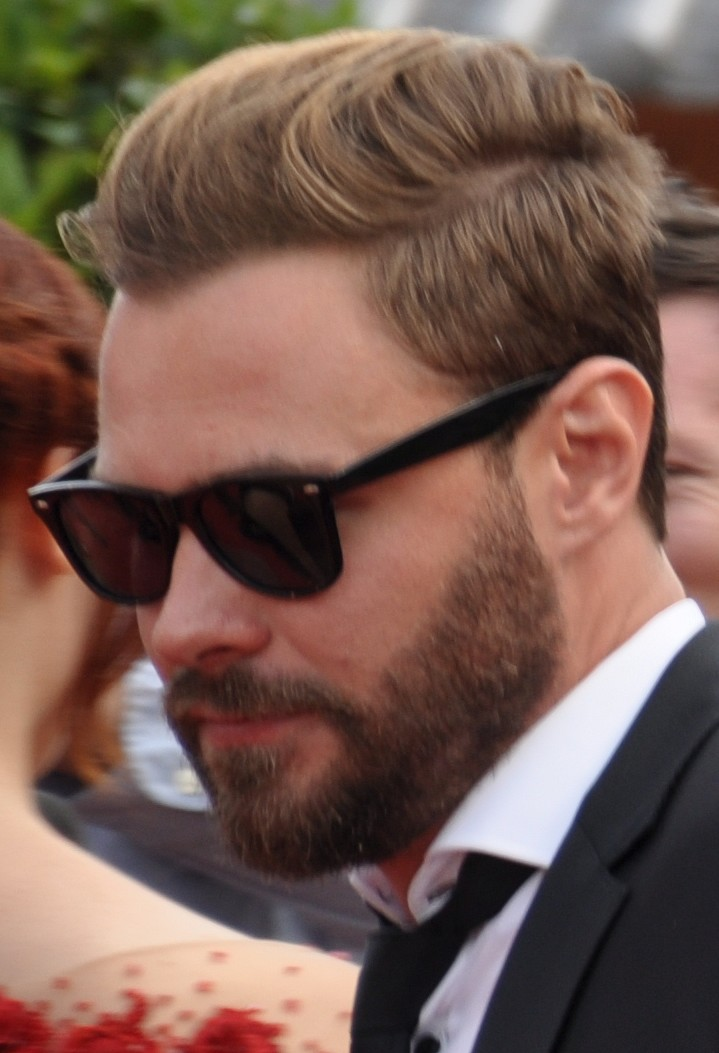
- Patrick Flueger in 2015
- Born: Patrick John Flueger; December 10, 1983 (age 42); Red Wing, Minnesota, US
- Occupation: Actor
- Years active: 2001–present

Patrick John Flueger (born December 10, 1983) is an American actor, first known for a principal role as Shawn Farrell in the television series The 4400. He currently appears in a lead role on Chicago P.D., playing Adam Ruzek.

== Life and career ==
Patrick John Flueger was born in Red Wing, Minnesota, on December 10, 1983, the eldest of three siblings. Flueger attended Red Wing High School graduating in 2002. Flueger's first significant role was in the Disney film The Princess Diaries. Next, Flueger followed several television appearances, including JAG, Law & Order: Special Victims Unit, and CSI: Miami. He then landed the role of Shawn Farrell in the USA Network series The 4400 (2004–07). While still working on The 4400, Flueger got the role of Rusty in the film The World's Fastest Indian, starring Anthony Hopkins. In The World's Fastest Indian, Flueger starred alongside Antony Starr. Flueger was later cast as the American version of the character Starr played in Outrageous Fortune, retitled in the American version as Scoundrels, airing on ABC during the summer of 2010.

He is also known for his role as Chuck Cranston in the 2011 Footloose remake, originally played by Jim Youngs in the 1984 original version.

Since 2011, his performances have been credited using his full name - Patrick John Flueger.

In August 2013, Flueger joined the cast for the Chicago Fire spin-off Chicago P.D. as rookie officer Adam Ruzek. The show premiered January 8, 2014.

He has also appeared in episodes of Law & Order: Special Victims Unit and Criminal Minds.

== Filmography ==
=== Film ===
Year	Title	Role	Notes
2001	The Princess Diaries	Jeremiah Hart	
2005	The World's Fastest Indian	Rusty	
2007	Spin	Ryan	
2009	Kill Theory	Michael	
2009	The Job	Bubba	
2009	Brothers	Private Joe Willis	
2010	VideoDome Rent-O-Rama	Dick	Short film
2010	Mother's Day	Izaak 'Ike' Koffin	
2011	Footloose	Chuck Cranston	
2013	Present Trauma	Keith	Short film
2014	San Patricios	Sean Donnelly	
2014	The Tell-Tale Heart	Sean	
2015	Loaded	Ethan	
2016	Lawless Range	Sean Donnelly	
2017	The Super	Phil Lodge	
2018	Lawless Range	Sean Donnelly	

=== Television ===
Year	Title	Role	Notes
2002	Septuplets	Zeke Wilde	Unaired pilot
2003	Judging Amy	Mark Thurber	Episode: "Judging Eric"
2003	The Pitts	'Pipe' Keith	Episode: "Miss American Pipe"
2003	CSI: Miami	Brad Kenner	Episode: "Freaks and Tweaks"
2003	Boston Public	Joseph Prager	Episode: "Chapter Sixty-Seven"
2003	Twelve Mile Road	Will Coffey	TV film
2003	Grounded for Life	Caleb	Episode: "Been Caught Stealing"
2003	JAG	P.O. Miles Yates	Episode: "Pulse Rate"
2004	Law & Order: Special Victims Unit	Aiden Connor	Episode: "Families"
2004	Paradise	Luke Paradise	TV film
2004	It's All Relative	Lance	Episode: "Tackleboxxx/The Love Below"
2004–2007	The 4400	Shawn Farrell	Main role
2010	Scoundrels	Logan West / Cal West	Main role
2013	Hatfields & McCoys	Jack McCoy	Unaired pilot
2013	Criminal Minds	Paul Westin	Episode: "Broken"
2013	Warehouse 13	Ranger Evan Smith	Episode: "Parks and Rehabilitation"
2014–present	Chicago Fire	Adam Ruzek	Recurring role
2014–present	Chicago P.D.	Adam Ruzek	Main role
2017	Special Skills	Paddy	Episode: "We Are Party Animals"
2019	Beta	Chad	TV series, post-production
2019	Chicago Med	Adam Ruzek	Guest Star
2022	4400	Caleb	Guest Star
