= Naiqui Macabroad =

American actor

- Occupation: Actor
- Years active: 2016–present

Naiqui Macabroad is an American actor best known for playing Officer Donovan "Penny" Watts in the TV series Chicago P.D. on NBC. He debuted on the show in October 2026.

== Career ==
Macabroad is a graduate of Howard University in Washington, D.C., where he obtained a Bachelor of Fine Arts in acting.

Macabroad played in a number of roles between 2016 and 2026, including in the TV shows Kingdom, Power, Startup, Timeless, Rise, The Conners, and Law & Order.

In addition to TV, Macabroad has worked actively in theater, including the role of Effie in I am Delivered't at the Dallas Theater Center (2023), and the Actors Theatre of Louisville (2024). He also took part in productions of Bye Bye Birdie, The Bluest Eye, and Trigger.

In 2026, he was cast in the role of Officer Donovan "Penny" Watts on the TV series Chicago P.D.. He debuted on October 28, 2026, in Season 14, Episode 4, entitled "My Eye, My Call." He plays an officer who stands out for his bravery and his knowledge of people in the community and is recruited by Sergeant Voight to be part of the Intelligence Unit.

== Selected filmography ==
Filmography credits from IMDb

=== Television ===
Year	Title	Role	Notes
2016	Kingdom	Dan	Episode: "Cut Man"
2016	Power	Dirt	Episodes: "I Got This on Lock" and "Don’t Worry Baby"
2016	Startup	Oskar	7 episodes
2017–2018	In the Moment	Kamahl	Episodes: "When Actors Have to Slate" and "The Power of Stillness"
2018	Timeless	Robert Leroy Johnson	Episode: "The King of the Delta Blues"
2018	Rise	Barklay	Episode: "This Will God Willing Get Better"
2019	Crashing	Jeremy	Episode: "The Secret"
2020	The Conners	Gabriel	Episode: "Plastics, Trash Talk & Darlene Antoinette"
2024	Diarra from Detroit	Brother Troy	Episode: "The One That Got Away"
2026	Law & Order	Raymond Booker	Episode: "New Normal"
2026	Maximum Pleasure Guaranteed	Tech	Episodes: "YABA" and "Chunnel"
2026–present	Chicago P.D.	Donovan Watts	3 episodes

=== Video games ===
Year	Title	Role	Notes
2026	Grand Theft Auto VI	Dre'Quan Priest	Voice, motion capture and likeness
