= List of Chicago P.D. episodes =

Chicago P.D. is an American television drama on NBC spun off from Chicago Fire. The series focuses on a uniformed police patrol and the Intelligence Unit that pursues the perpetrators of the city's high-profile major street offenses. The series premiered on January 8, 2014. In May 2025, the series was renewed for a thirteenth season, which premiered on October 1, 2025.

As of November 18, 2026, 271 episodes of Chicago P.D. have aired, currently in its fourteenth season.

== Series overview ==
Season	Episodes	Originally released		Rank	Average viewers (million)
Season	Episodes	First released	Last released	Rank	Average viewers (million)
Pilot		May 15, 2013		—N/a	6.90
1	15	January 8, 2014	May 21, 2014	50	8.03
2	23	September 24, 2014	May 20, 2015	51	8.74
3	23	September 30, 2015	May 25, 2016	47	8.71
4	23	September 21, 2016	May 17, 2017	36	8.48
5	22	September 27, 2017	May 9, 2018	24	10.32
6	22	September 26, 2018	May 22, 2019	18	11.18
7	20	September 25, 2019	April 15, 2020	11	11.23
8	16	November 11, 2020	May 26, 2021	10	9.73
9	22	September 22, 2021	May 25, 2022	13	9.15
10	22	September 21, 2022	May 24, 2023	13	8.27
11	13	January 17, 2024	May 22, 2024	13	7.87
12	22	September 25, 2024	May 21, 2025	16	9.61
13	21	October 1, 2025	May 13, 2026	18	9.10
14	21	October 7, 2026	TBA	TBA	TBA

== Episodes ==
=== Backdoor pilot (2013) ===
No. overall	No. in season	Title	Directed by	Written by	Original release date	Prod. code	US viewers (millions)
23	23	"Let Her Go"	Joe Chappelle	Story by : Dick Wolf & Matt Olmstead; Teleplay by : Michael Brandt & Derek Haas	May 15, 2013	123	6.90

=== Season 1 (2014) ===
No. overall	No. in season	Title	Directed by	Written by	Original release date	Prod. code	U.S. viewers (millions)
1	1	"Stepping Stone"	Michael Slovis	Matt Olmstead	January 8, 2014	101	8.59
2	2	"Wrong Side of the Bars"	Joe Chappelle	Michael Brandt & Derek Haas	January 15, 2014	102	5.50
3	3	"Chin Check"	Sanford Bookstaver	David Hoselton	January 22, 2014	103	6.24
4	4	"Now Is Always Temporary"	Mark Tinker	Denitria Harris-Lawrence	January 29, 2014	104	6.89
5	5	"Thirty Balloons"	Karen Gaviola	Craig Gore & Tim Walsh	February 5, 2014	105	6.00
6	6	"Conventions"	Alik Sakharov	Maisha Closson	February 26, 2014	106	8.00
7	7	"The Price We Pay"	Mark Tinker	Michael Brandt & Derek Haas	March 5, 2014	107	6.05
8	8	"Different Mistakes"	Fred Berner	Bryan Garcia	March 12, 2014	108	5.84
9	9	"A Material Witness"	Sanford Bookstaver	Michael Batistick	March 19, 2014	109	5.74
10	10	"At Least It's Justice"	Michael Slovis	Craig Gore & Tim Walsh	April 2, 2014	110	5.75
11	11	"Turn the Light Off"	Nick Gomez	David Hoselton	April 9, 2014	111	6.49
12	12	"8:30 PM"	Mark Tinker	Story by : Dick Wolf & Matt Olmstead; Teleplay by : Michael Brandt & Derek Haas	April 30, 2014	112	7.28
13	13	"My Way"	Karen Gaviola	Matt Olmstead & Michael Batistick	May 7, 2014	113	5.39
14	14	"The Docks"	Nick Gomez	Craig Gore & Tim Walsh	May 14, 2014	114	6.06
15	15	"A Beautiful Friendship"	Mark Tinker	Story by : Michael Batistick; Teleplay by : Michael Brandt & Derek Haas	May 21, 2014	115	6.27

=== Season 2 (2014–15) ===
No. overall	No. in season	Title	Directed by	Written by	Original release date	Prod. code	U.S. viewers (millions)
16	1	"Call It Macaroni"	Mark Tinker	Matt Olmstead	September 24, 2014	201	8.51
17	2	"Get My Cigarettes"	Arthur W. Forney	Craig Gore & Tim Walsh	October 1, 2014	202	6.63
18	3	"The Weigh Station"	Nick Gomez	Michael Batistick	October 8, 2014	203	6.67
19	4	"Chicken, Dynamite, Chainsaw"	Reza Tabrizi	Mo Masi	October 15, 2014	204	6.78
20	5	"An Honest Woman"	Mark Tinker	Michael Weiss	October 22, 2014	205	6.85
21	6	"Prison Ball"	Sanford Bookstaver	Eduardo Javier Canto & Ryan Maldonado	November 5, 2014	206	6.15
22	7	"They'll Have to Go Through Me"	Sanford Bookstaver	Story by : Dick Wolf & Matt Olmstead; Teleplay by : Maisha Closson	November 12, 2014	207	9.54
23	8	"Assignment of the Year"	Nick Gomez	Mick Betancourt	November 19, 2014	208	7.29
24	9	"Called in Dead"	Alik Sakharov	Craig Gore & Tim Walsh	December 10, 2014	209	6.71
25	10	"Shouldn't Have Been Alone"	Fred Berner	Michael Weiss	January 7, 2015	210	7.41
26	11	"We Don't Work Together Anymore"	Mario Van Peebles	Michael Bastick & Mo Masi	January 14, 2015	211	6.77
27	12	"Disco Bob"	Holly Dale	Maisha Closson & Cole Maliska	January 21, 2015	212	7.00
28	13	"A Little Devil Complex"	Steve Shill	Michael Brandt & Derek Haas	February 4, 2015	213	7.58
29	14	"Erin's Mom"	Mark Tinker	Craig Gore & Tim Walsh	February 11, 2015	214	6.58
30	15	"What Do You Do"	Nick Gomez	Michael Brandt & Derek Haas	February 18, 2015	215	7.08
31	16	"What Puts You On That Ledge"	Fred Berner	Eduardo Javier Canto & Ryan Maldonado	February 25, 2015	216	7.43
32	17	"Say Her Real Name"	Nick Gomez	Story by : Dick Wolf & Matt Olmstead; Teleplay by : Craig Gore & Tim Walsh	March 25, 2015	217	6.34
33	18	"Get Back to Even"	Jann Turner	Michael Weiss	April 1, 2015	218	6.59
34	19	"The Three Gs"	Sanford Bookstaver	Craig Gore & Tim Walsh	April 8, 2015	219	6.73
35	20	"The Number of Rats"	Nick Gomez	Story by : Matt Olmstead & Warren Leight; Teleplay by : Matt Olmstead & Cole Maliska	April 29, 2015	220	8.07
36	21	"There's My Girl"	Mark Tinker	Michael Batstick & Mo Masi	May 6, 2015	221	6.54
37	22	"Push the Pain Away"	Sanford Bookstaver	Story by : Eduardo Javier Canto & Ryan Maldonado; Teleplay by : Michael Weiss	May 13, 2015	222	6.94
38	23	"Born Into Bad News"	Mark Tinker	Craig Gore & Tim Walsh	May 20, 2015	223	7.21

=== Season 3 (2015–16) ===
No. overall	No. in season	Title	Directed by	Written by	Original release date	Prod. code	U.S. viewers (millions)
39	1	"Life Is Fluid"	Arthur W. Forney	Craig Gore & Tim Walsh	September 30, 2015	301	6.65
40	2	"Natural Born Storyteller"	Mark Tinker	Mike Weiss	October 7, 2015	302	6.49
41	3	"Actual Physical Violence"	Fred Berner	Eduardo Javier Canto & Ryan Maldonado	October 14, 2015	303	6.58
42	4	"Debts of the Past"	Rohn Schmidt	Michael Brandt & Derek Haas	October 21, 2015	304	6.24
43	5	"Climbing Into Bed"	Mark Tinker	Cole Maliska	October 28, 2015	305	6.14
44	6	"You Never Know Who's Who"	Lin Oeding	Craig Gore & Tim Walsh	October 28, 2015	306	6.14
45	7	"A Dead Kid, a Notebook and a Lot of Maybes"	Charlotte Brändström	Timothy J. Sexton	November 4, 2015	307	6.48
46	8	"Forget My Name"	Nick Gomez	Mike Weiss	November 11, 2015	308	6.79
47	9	"Never Forget I Love You"	Terry Miller	Story by : Ryan Maldonado & Eduardo Javier Canto; Teleplay by : Craig Gore & Tim Walsh	November 18, 2015	309	6.47
48	10	"Now I'm God"	Holly Dale	Jamie Pachino	January 6, 2016	310	8.75
49	11	"Knocked the Family Right Out"	Mark Tinker	Mo Masi	January 13, 2016	311	7.99
50	12	"Looking Out for Stateville"	Fred Berner	Craig Gore & Tim Walsh	January 20, 2016	312	6.52
51	13	"Hit Me"	Rohn Schmidt	Mike Weiss & Cole Maliska	February 3, 2016	313	7.22
52	14	"The Song of Gregory Williams Yates"	Michael Grossman	Jamie Pachino	February 10, 2016	314	8.28
53	15	"A Night Owl"	Nick Gomez	Timothy J. Sexton	February 17, 2016	315	7.45
54	16	"The Cases that Need to Be Solved"	Jean de Segonzac	Matt Olmstead	February 24, 2016	316	6.99
55	17	"Forty-Caliber Bread Crumb"	Jann Turner	Craig Gore & Tim Walsh	March 2, 2016	317	7.17
56	18	"Kasual with a K"	David Rodriguez	Eduardo Javier Canto & Ryan Maldonado	March 23, 2016	318	6.27
57	19	"If We Were Normal"	Mark Tinker	Mo Masi	March 30, 2016	319	6.79
58	20	"In a Duffel Bag"	Nick Gomez	Jamie Pachino	May 4, 2016	320	6.32
59	21	"Justice"	Jean de Segonzac	Story by : Dick Wolf; Teleplay by : Michael Brandt & Derek Haas & Matt Olmstead	May 11, 2016	321	6.75
60	22	"She's Got Us"	Lin Oeding	Mike Weiss	May 18, 2016	322	6.93
61	23	"Start Digging"	Mark Tinker	Craig Gore & Tim Walsh	May 25, 2016	323	6.88

=== Season 4 (2016–17) ===
No. overall	No. in season	Title	Directed by	Written by	Original release date	Prod. code	U.S. viewers (millions)
62	1	"The Silos"	Mark Tinker	Matt Olmstead	September 21, 2016	401	6.87
63	2	"Made a Wrong Turn"	Fred Berner	Craig Gore & Tim Walsh	September 28, 2016	402	6.14
64	3	"All Cylinders Firing"	Nick Gomez	Mike Weiss	October 5, 2016	404	6.22
65	4	"Big Friends, Big Enemies"	Rohn Schmidt	Gwen Sigan	October 12, 2016	405	6.15
66	5	"A War Zone"	Eriq La Salle	Tiller Russell	October 26, 2016	403	5.82
67	6	"Some Friend"	Mark Tinker	Timothy J. Sexton	November 9, 2016	406	5.70
68	7	"300,000 Likes"	Charlotte Brandström	Jamie Pachino	November 16, 2016	407	6.11
69	8	"A Shot Heard Around the World"	Terry Miller	Matt Olmstead & Gwen Sigan	November 16, 2016	408	6.11
70	9	"Don't Bury This Case"	Cherie Nowlan	Craig Gore & Tim Walsh	January 3, 2017	409	7.89
71	10	"Don't Read the News"	Nick Gomez	Mike Weiss	January 4, 2017	410	6.30
72	11	"You Wish"	Mark Tinker	Tiller Russell	January 11, 2017	411	6.60
73	12	"Sanctuary"	John Hyams	Timothy J. Sexton	January 18, 2017	412	7.11
74	13	"I Remember Her Now"	David Rodriguez	Gwen Sigan	February 8, 2017	413	6.27
75	14	"Seven Indictments"	Mark Tinker	Jamie Pachino	February 15, 2017	414	6.68
76	15	"Favor, Affection, Malice or Ill-Will"	Holly Dale	Craig Gore & Tim Walsh	February 22, 2017	415	6.68
77	16	"Emotional Proximity"	Reza Tabrizi	Matt Olmstead	March 1, 2017	416	9.59
78	17	"Remember the Devil"	Rohn Schmidt	Mike Weiss	March 22, 2017	417	6.39
79	18	"Little Bit of Light"	Lin Oeding	Gwen Sigan	March 29, 2017	418	6.10
80	19	"Last Minute Resistance"	John Hyams	Timothy J. Sexton	April 5, 2017	419	6.52
81	20	"Grasping for Salvation"	David Rodriguez	Tiller Russell	April 26, 2017	420	6.27
82	21	"Fagin"	Fred Berner	Craig Gore & Tim Walsh	May 3, 2017	421	6.15
83	22	"Army of One"	John Whitesell	Tiller Russell & Timothy J. Sexton	May 10, 2017	422	6.17
84	23	"Fork in the Road"	Mark Tinker	Mike Weiss	May 17, 2017	423	6.50

=== Season 5 (2017–18) ===
No. overall	No. in season	Title	Directed by	Written by	Original release date	Prod. code	U.S. viewers (millions)
85	1	"Reform"	Eriq La Salle	Rick Eid	September 27, 2017	501	6.11
86	2	"The Thing About Heroes"	Rohn Schmidt	John Dove	October 4, 2017	503	6.19
87	3	"Promise"	John Whitesell	Timothy J. Sexton	October 11, 2017	502	6.07
88	4	"Snitch"	Terry Miller	Story by : Rick Eid & Gavin Harris; Teleplay by : Rick Eid	October 18, 2017	504	5.79
89	5	"Home"	Eriq La Salle	Sharon Lee Watson	October 25, 2017	505	6.16
90	6	"Fallen"	Nick Gomez	Gavin Harris	November 8, 2017	506	5.16
91	7	"Care Under Fire"	Lily Mariye	Gwen Sigan	November 15, 2017	507	6.39
92	8	"Politics"	Mark Tinker	Kinan Copen	November 29, 2017	508	6.95
93	9	"Monster"	Valerie Weiss	Timothy J. Sexton	December 6, 2017	509	6.52
94	10	"Rabbit Hole"	Carl Seaton	Rick Eid & Gwen Sigan	January 3, 2018	510	6.78
95	11	"Confidential"	Mark Tinker	Rick Eid & Sharon Lee Watson	January 10, 2018	511	6.86
96	12	"Captive"	Eriq La Salle	Gavin Harris	January 17, 2018	512	6.66
97	13	"Chasing Monsters"	Terry Miller	John Dove	January 31, 2018	513	6.72
98	14	"Anthem"	John Hyams	Timothy J. Sexton	February 7, 2018	515	7.25
99	15	"Sisterhood"	Rohn Schmidt	Rick Eid & Katherine Visconti	February 28, 2018	514	6.09
100	16	"Profiles"	Eriq La Salle	Gwen Sigan	March 7, 2018	516	6.62
101	17	"Breaking Point"	Terry Miller	Sharon Lee Watson	March 14, 2018	517	6.54
102	18	"Ghosts"	Nick Gomez	Gavin Harris	March 21, 2018	518	6.92
103	19	"Payback"	Nicole Rubio	Story by : John Dove; Teleplay by : John Dove & Timothy J. Sexton	April 11, 2018	519	5.89
104	20	"Saved"	Paul McCrane	Gwen Sigan	April 18, 2018	520	6.62
105	21	"Allegiance"	Carl Seaton	Rick Eid & Timothy J. Sexton	May 2, 2018	521	6.06
106	22	"Homecoming"	Eriq La Salle	Rick Eid & Timothy J. Sexton	May 9, 2018	522	6.34

=== Season 6 (2018–19) ===
No. overall	No. in season	Title	Directed by	Written by	Original release date	Prod. code	U.S. viewers (millions)
107	1	"New Normal"	Eriq La Salle	Rick Eid	September 26, 2018	601	7.14
108	2	"Endings"	David Rodriguez	Gwen Sigan	October 3, 2018	602	7.78
109	3	"Bad Boys"	Nick Gomez	Timothy J. Sexton	October 10, 2018	603	7.16
110	4	"Ride Along"	Nicole Rubio	Gavin Harris	October 17, 2018	604	6.95
111	5	"Fathers and Sons"	Eriq La Salle	Jeffrey Nachmanoff	October 24, 2018	605	6.64
112	6	"True or False"	Paul McCrane	Story by : Rick Eid & Gavin Harris; Teleplay by : Rick Eid	October 31, 2018	606	6.95
113	7	"Trigger"	Carl Seaton	Todd Robinson	November 7, 2018	607	6.84
114	8	"Black and Blue"	Christine Swanson	Kim Rome	November 14, 2018	608	6.00
115	9	"Descent"	Nicole Rubio	Rick Eid & Timothy J. Sexton	December 5, 2018	609	6.82
116	10	"Brotherhood"	Mykelti Williamson	Gwen Sigan	January 9, 2019	610	6.86
117	11	"Trust"	Lily Mariye	Gavin Harris	January 16, 2019	611	7.26
118	12	"Outrage"	Vincent Misiano	Story by : Timothy J. Sexton & April Fitsimmons; Teleplay by : Timothy J. Sexton	January 23, 2019	612	7.22
119	13	"Night in Chicago"	Eriq La Salle	Rick Eid & Ike Smith	February 6, 2019	613	7.38
120	14	"Ties That Bind"	Paul McCrane	Kim Rome & Katherine Visconti	February 13, 2019	614	7.49
121	15	"Good Men"	Donald Petrie	Gwen Sigan	February 20, 2019	615	8.91
122	16	"The Forgotten"	Eriq La Salle	Gavin Harris	February 27, 2019	616	7.15
123	17	"Pain Killer"	Nicole Rubio	Timothy J. Sexton	March 27, 2019	617	7.01
124	18	"This City"	Carl Seaton	Rick Eid & Gwen Sigan	April 3, 2019	618	6.86
125	19	"What Could Have Been"	Eriq La Salle	Rick Eid & Gwen Sigan	April 24, 2019	619	6.99
126	20	"Sacrifice"	John Hyams	Gavin Harris	May 8, 2019	620	6.29
127	21	"Confession"	Carl Seaton	Timothy J. Sexton	May 15, 2019	621	6.73
128	22	"Reckoning"	Eriq La Salle	Rick Eid & Gwen Sigan	May 22, 2019	622	6.59

=== Season 7 (2019–20) ===
No. overall	No. in season	Title	Directed by	Written by	Original release date	Prod. code	U.S. viewers (millions)
129	1	"Doubt"	Eriq La Salle	Rick Eid & Gavin Harris	September 25, 2019	701	6.49
130	2	"Assets"	Carl Seaton	Rick Eid & Gavin Harris	October 2, 2019	702	5.90
131	3	"Familia"	Eriq La Salle	Timothy J. Sexton	October 9, 2019	703	6.34
132	4	"Infection: Part III"	Eriq La Salle	Teleplay by : Gwen Sigan; Story by : Dick Wolf & Derek Haas	October 16, 2019	704	8.62
133	5	"Brother's Keeper"	Vince Misiano	Joe Halpin	October 23, 2019	705	6.64
134	6	"False Positive"	David Rodriguez	Scott Gold	October 30, 2019	706	6.29
135	7	"Informant"	Vince Misiano	Gwen Sigan	November 6, 2019	707	6.44
136	8	"No Regrets"	Mykelti Williamson	Kim Rome	November 13, 2019	708	6.47
137	9	"Absolution"	Paul McCrane	Gavin Harris	November 20, 2019	709	6.88
138	10	"Mercy"	Olivia Newman	Timothy J. Sexton	January 8, 2020	710	7.02
139	11	"43rd and Normal"	Chad Saxton	Rick Eid & Gwen Sigan	January 15, 2020	711	6.78
140	12	"The Devil You Know"	Eriq La Salle	Scott Gold	January 22, 2020	712	6.91
141	13	"I Was Here"	Charles S. Carroll	Gwen Sigan	February 5, 2020	713	7.14
142	14	"Center Mass"	Lisa Demaine	Gavin Harris	February 12, 2020	714	7.00
143	15	"Burden of Truth"	Eriq La Salle	Rick Eid & Gwen Sigan	February 26, 2020	715	8.12
144	16	"Intimate Violence"	Mykelti Williamson	Teleplay by : Timothy J. Sexton; Story by : Timothy J. Sexton & Ike Smith	March 4, 2020	716	7.07
145	17	"Before the Fall"	Nicole Rubio	Scott Gold & Jake Tinker	March 18, 2020	717	7.50
146	18	"Lines"	Alex Chapple	Kim Rome & Gwen Sigan	March 25, 2020	718	7.75
147	19	"Buried Secrets"	Paul McCrane	Teleplay by : Timothy J. Sexton; Story by : Timothy J. Sexton & Gwen Sigan	April 8, 2020	719	7.75
148	20	"Silence of the Night"	Eriq La Salle	Rick Eid & Gavin Harris	April 15, 2020	720	7.82

=== Season 8 (2020–21) ===
No. overall	No. in season	Title	Directed by	Written by	Original release date	Prod. code	U.S. viewers (millions)
149	1	"Fighting Ghosts"	Eriq La Salle	Teleplay by : Rick Eid; Story by : Rick Eid & Gavin Harris	November 11, 2020	801	6.43
150	2	"White Knuckle"	Nicole Rubio	Gwen Sigan	November 18, 2020	802	6.38
151	3	"Tender Age"	Eriq La Salle	Gwen Sigan	January 13, 2021 (Note: This episode was originally scheduled to air on January 6, 2021,, but was replaced by a rerun of season 7 episode "Before the Fall" in the Pacific and Mountain time zone, due to news coverage of the January 6 United States Capitol attack.)	803	6.58
152	4	"Unforgiven"	Chad Saxton	Rick Eid & Gavin Harris	January 27, 2021 (Note: This episode was originally scheduled to air on January 13, 2021, but was replaced in the United States by "Tender Age", which was postponed from the previous Wednesday.)	804	5.97
153	5	"In Your Care"	Charles S. Carroll	Gwen Sigan	February 3, 2021 (Note: This episode was originally scheduled to air on January 20, 2021, but was replaced by a rerun of season 7 episode "Silence of the Night", due to news coverage of the inauguration of Joe Biden.)	805	6.09
154	6	"Equal Justice"	Eric Laneuville	Daniel Arkin	February 10, 2021	806	6.31
155	7	"Instinct"	Chad Saxton	Scott Gold	February 17, 2021	807	5.87
156	8	"Protect and Serve"	Eriq La Salle	Gwen Sigan & Ike Smith	March 10, 2021	808	5.89
157	9	"Impossible Dream"	Charles S. Carroll	Rick Eid & Gavin Harris	March 17, 2021	809	6.21
158	10	"The Radical Truth"	Lisa Demaine	Scott Gold	March 31, 2021	810	6.42
159	11	"Signs of Violence"	Bethany Rooney	Gwen Sigan	April 7, 2021	811	5.80
160	12	"Due Process"	Guy Ferland	Rick Eid & Gavin Harris	April 21, 2021	812	5.89
161	13	"Trouble Dolls"	John Polson	Scott Gold	May 5, 2021 (Note: This episode was originally scheduled to air on April 28, 2021, but was preempted due to President Joe Biden's presidential address to the joint session of Congress.)	813	5.67
162	14	"Safe"	S. J. Main Muñoz	Gavin Harris	May 12, 2021	814	5.94
163	15	"The Right Thing"	Vince Misiano	Rick Eid & Gwen Sigan	May 19, 2021	815	5.64
164	16	"The Other Side"	Chad Saxton	Rick Eid & Gwen Sigan	May 26, 2021	816	6.33

=== Season 9 (2021–22) ===
No. overall	No. in season	Title	Directed by	Written by	Original release date	Prod. code	U.S. viewers (millions)
165	1	"Closure"	Vince Misiano	Rick Eid & Gwen Sigan	September 22, 2021	901	6.54
166	2	"Rage"	Chad Saxton	Gavin Harris & Matthew Newman	September 29, 2021	902	6.22
167	3	"The One Next to Me"	Bethany Rooney	Scott Gold	October 6, 2021	903	5.75
168	4	"In the Dark"	Carl Seaton	Gwen Sigan	October 13, 2021	904	5.98
169	5	"Burnside"	Brenna Malloy	Ike Smith	October 20, 2021	905	5.57
170	6	"End of Watch"	Marc Roskin	Gavin Harris	October 27, 2021	906	5.62
171	7	"Trust Me"	Chad Saxton	Matthew Newman	November 3, 2021	907	5.58
172	8	"Fractures"	Charles S. Carroll	Scott Gold	November 10, 2021	908	5.58
173	9	"A Way Out"	Lisa Robinson	Gwen Sigan	December 8, 2021	909	5.64
174	10	"Home Safe"	Lisa Demaine	Elena Perez	January 5, 2022	910	6.06
175	11	"Lies"	Eif Rivera	Teleplay by : Ike Smith; Story by : Gavin Harris & Ike Smith	January 12, 2022	911	5.81
176	12	"To Protect"	Bethany Rooney	Gavin Harris	January 19, 2022	912	5.79
177	13	"Still Water"	Chad Saxton	Gwen Sigan	February 23, 2022	913	6.01
178	14	"Blood Relation"	Guy Ferland	Scott Gold	March 2, 2022	914	5.81
179	15	"Gone"	Brenna Malloy	Matthew Newman	March 9, 2022	915	6.38
180	16	"Closer"	Chad Saxton	Gwen Sigan	March 16, 2022	916	5.33
181	17	"Adrift"	Marc Roskin	Gavin Harris	April 6, 2022	917	5.71
182	18	"New Guard"	Takashi Doscher	Scott Gold	April 13, 2022	918	5.92
183	19	"Fool's Gold"	Bethany Rooney	Ike Smith	April 20, 2022	919	6.08
184	20	"Memory"	Benny Boom	Gwen Sigan	May 11, 2022	920	5.56
185	21	"House of Cards"	Vince Misiano	Gavin Harris	May 18, 2022	921	5.47
186	22	"You and Me"	Chad Saxton	Gwen Sigan	May 25, 2022	922	5.98

=== Season 10 (2022–23) ===
No. overall	No. in season	Title	Directed by	Written by	Original release date	Prod. code	U.S. viewers (millions)
187	1	"Let It Bleed"	Chad Saxton	Gwen Sigan	September 21, 2022	1001	5.48
188	2	"The Real You"	Lisa Robinson	Gavin Harris	September 28, 2022	1002	5.32
189	3	"A Good Man"	Carl Seaton	Scott Gold	October 5, 2022	1003	5.95
190	4	"Dónde Vives"	Brenna Malloy	Kevin Deiboldt	October 12, 2022	1004	5.65
191	5	"Pink Cloud"	Chad Saxton	Gwen Sigan	October 19, 2022	1005	5.58
192	6	"Sympathetic Reflex"	Bethany Rooney	Ike Smith	November 2, 2022	1006	5.06
193	7	"Into the Deep"	Takashi Doscher	Scott Gold	November 9, 2022	1007	4.69
194	8	"Under the Skin"	Marc Roskin	Gavin Harris	November 16, 2022	1008	5.39
195	9	"Proof of Burden"	Chad Saxton	Gwen Sigan	December 7, 2022	1009	5.39
196	10	"This Job"	John Hyams	Jeffrey M. Lee	January 4, 2023	1010	5.59
197	11	"Long Lost"	Oz Scott	Kevin Deiboldt	January 11, 2023	1011	5.45
198	12	"I Can Let You Go"	Gia-Rayne B. Harris	Teleplay by : Scott Gold; Story by : Gwen Sigan & Scott Gold	January 18, 2023	1012	5.58
199	13	"The Ghost in You"	Benny Boom	Gavin Harris	February 15, 2023	1013	5.20
200	14	"Trapped"	Chad Saxton	Gwen Sigan	February 22, 2023	1014	5.71
201	15	"Blood and Honor"	Vince Misiano	Gwen Sigan & Kevin Deiboldt	March 1, 2023	1015	5.03
202	16	"Deadlocked"	Jesse Lee Soffer	Matthew Brown	March 22, 2023	1016	4.97
203	17	"Out of the Depths"	Guy Ferland	Elena Perez	March 29, 2023	1017	5.20
204	18	"You Only Die Twice"	Jon Cassar	Gavin Harris	April 5, 2023	1018	5.04
205	19	"The Bleed Valve"	Bethany Rooney	Scott Gold	May 3, 2023	1019	5.01
206	20	"Fight"	Victor Macias	Sean Collins-Smith	May 10, 2023	1020	4.87
207	21	"New Life"	Carl Seaton	Gavin Harris	May 17, 2023	1021	4.91
208	22	"A Better Place"	Chad Saxton	Teleplay by : Gwen Sigan; Story by : Brian Luce	May 24, 2023	1022	4.76

=== Season 11 (2024) ===
No. overall	No. in season	Title	Directed by	Written by	Original release date	Prod. code	U.S. viewers (millions)
209	1	"Unpacking"	Chad Saxton	Gwen Sigan	January 17, 2024	1101	5.82
210	2	"Retread"	Lisa Robinson	Gavin Harris	January 24, 2024	1102	5.48
211	3	"Safe Harbor"	Takashi Doscher	Scott Gold	January 31, 2024	1103	5.53
212	4	"Escape"	Chad Saxton	David Rambo	February 7, 2024	1104	5.07
213	5	"Split Second"	Eric Laneuville	Tiffany Bratcher	February 21, 2024	1105	5.35
214	6	"Survival"	Victor Macias	Matthew Browne	February 28, 2024	1106	5.16
215	7	"The Living and the Dead"	Chad Saxton	Teleplay by : Gwen Sigan; Story by : Gavin Harris & Gwen Sigan	March 20, 2024	1107	5.06
216	8	"On Paper"	Nicole Rubio	Teleplay by : Jeffrey M. Lee; Story by : Gavin Harris & Jeffrey M. Lee	March 27, 2024	1108	5.17
217	9	"Somos Uno"	Chad Saxton	Gavin Harris	April 3, 2024	1109	4.75
218	10	"Buried Pieces"	Brenna Malloy	Gwen Sigan	May 1, 2024	1110	5.01
219	11	"The Water Line"	Gia-Rayne Harris	Scott Gold	May 8, 2024	1111	4.73
220	12	"Inventory"	Jesse Lee Soffer	Gavin Harris & Gwen Sigan	May 15, 2024	1112	4.99
221	13	"More"	Chad Saxton	Teleplay by : Gwen Sigan; Story by : Rick Eid & Gavin Harris & Gwen Sigan	May 22, 2024	1113	4.89

=== Season 12 (2024–25) ===
No. overall	No. in season	Title	Directed by	Written by	Original release date	Prod. code	U.S. viewers (millions)
222	1	"Ten Ninety-Nine"	Chad Saxton	Gwen Sigan	September 25, 2024	1201	4.31
223	2	"Blood Bleeds Blue"	Victor Macias	Gavin Harris	October 2, 2024	1202	4.82
224	3	"Off Switch"	Takashi Doscher	Matthew Browne	October 9, 2024	1203	4.34
225	4	"The After"	Marc Roskin	Mellori Velasquez	October 16, 2024	1204	4.75
226	5	"Water and Honey"	Chad Saxton	Gwen Sigan	October 23, 2024	1205	4.77
227	6	"Pawns"	John Hyams	Joe Halpin	November 6, 2024	1206	4.45
228	7	"Contrition"	Gonzalo Amat	Gavin Harris	November 13, 2024	1207	4.34
229	8	"Penance"	Chad Saxton	Gwen Sigan	November 20, 2024	1208	4.36
230	9	"Friends and Family"	Takashi Doscher	Tiffany Bratcher & Bridget Tyler	January 8, 2025	1209	4.73
231	10	"Zoe"	Lisa Robinson	Teleplay by : Gwen Sigan & Matthew Browne; Story by : Gwen Sigan & Gavin Harris	January 22, 2025	1210	4.86
232	11	"In the Trenches: Part III"	Chad Saxton	Joe Halpin	January 29, 2025	1211	6.39
233	12	"The Good Shepherd"	Brenna Malloy	Mellori Velasquez	February 5, 2025	1212	4.47
234	13	"Street Jesus"	John Polson	Rick Eid & Joe Halpin	February 19, 2025	1213	4.68
235	14	"Marie"	Carl Seaton	Teleplay by : Gavin Harris; Story by : Gwen Sigan & Gavin Harris	February 26, 2025	1214	4.60
236	15	"Greater Good"	Victor Macias	Gavin Harris & Gwen Sigan	March 5, 2025	1215	4.40
237	16	"Seen and Unseen"	Stephen Surjik	Gavin Harris & Gwen Sigan	March 26, 2025	1216	4.83
238	17	"Transference"	Chad Saxton	Matthew Browne	April 2, 2025	1217	4.66
239	18	"Demons"	Paul McCrane	Gavin Harris	April 16, 2025	1218	4.44
240	19	"Name Image Likeness"	Keesha Sharp	Mellori Velasquez	April 23, 2025	1219	4.17
241	20	"Black Ice"	John Polson	Gwen Sigan & Tiffany Bratcher	May 7, 2025	1220	4.42
242	21	"Open Casket"	Victor Macias	Gavin Harris	May 14, 2025	1221	4.29
243	22	"Vows"	Chad Saxton	Gwen Sigan	May 21, 2025	1222	4.75

=== Season 13 (2025–26) ===
No. overall	No. in season	Title	Directed by	Written by	Original airdate	Prod. code	U.S. viewers (millions)
244	1	"Consequences"	Chad Saxton	Gwen Sigan	October 1, 2025	1301	4.39
245	2	"Open Wounds"	Jesse Lee Soffer	Edgar Castillo	October 8, 2025	1304	3.92
246	3	"Canaryville"	Marc Roskin	Mellori Velasquez	October 15, 2025	1303	4.22
247	4	"Root Cause"	Victor Macias	Gavin Harris	October 22, 2025	1302	4.42
248	5	"Miami"	Chad Saxton	Stephen Scaia	October 29, 2025	1305	4.28
249	6	"Send Me"	Lisa Robinson	Teleplay by : Gwen Sigan; Story by : Gwen Sigan & Tiffany Bratcher	November 5, 2025	1306	3.99
250	7	"Impulse Control"	Chad Saxton	Matthew Browne	November 12, 2025	1307	4.14
251	8	"Born Screaming"	Paul McCrane	Gavin Harris	January 7, 2026	1308	N/A
252	9	"Heroes"	Stephen Surjik	Gavin Harris & Matthew Browne	January 14, 2026	1309	N/A
253	10	"Faith"	Hanelle Culpepper	Mellori Velasquez	January 21, 2026	1310	N/A
254	11	"On the Way"	Keesha Sharp	Stephen Scaia	January 28, 2026	1311	N/A
255	12	"Missing"	Chad Saxton	Gwen Sigan	February 4, 2026	1312	N/A
256	13	"Reckoning, Part III"	Chad Saxton	Edgar Castillo	March 4, 2026	1314	6.12
257	14	"Meant to Be"	Victor Macias	Gavin Harris	March 11, 2026	1313	N/A
258	15	"Live and Die By Your C.I."	Chris Grismer	Edgar Castillo	March 18, 2026	1315	N/A
259	16	"Restored"	Milena Govich	Teleplay by : Matthew Browne; Story by : William Angelico & Matthew Browne	April 1, 2026	1316	N/A
260	17	"Partners"	Lisa Robinson	Gwen Sigan	April 8, 2026	1317	N/A
261	18	"The Wicked River"	John Hyams	Stephen Scaia	April 22, 2026	1318	N/A
262	19	"Going Back"	Paul McCrane	Gavin Harris & D. Dona Le & Matthew Browne	April 29, 2026	1319	N/A
263	20	"The Lost Years"	Victor Macias	Gavin Harris & Gwen Sigan	May 6, 2026	1320	N/A
264	21	"Born or Made"	Chad Saxton	Gavin Harris & Gwen Sigan	May 13, 2026	1321	N/A

=== Season 14 (2026) ===
No. overall	No. in season	Title	Directed by	Written by	Original release date	Prod. code	U.S. viewers (millions)
265	1	"Demolition"	Chad Saxton	Gwen Sigan & Gavin Harris	October 7, 2026	1401	3.98
266	2	"Don't Blink"	Jesse Lee Soffer	Gwen Sigan	October 14, 2026	1402	4.03
267	3	"Under the Surface"	Takashi Doscher	Jonathan Abrahams	October 21, 2026	1403	3.66
268	4	"My Eye, My Call"	Chad Saxton	Edgar Castillo & Gwen Sigan	October 28, 2026	1404	3.59
269	5	"Dark Imaginings"	Victor Macias	Gavin Harris	November 4, 2026	1405	3.95
270	6	"The Thin Grey Line"	Chris Grismer	D. Dona Le	November 11, 2026	1406	4.09
271	7	"Persons Yet Unknown"	TBA	Matthew Browne	November 18, 2026	TBA	TBD

== Home media ==
Season	Episodes	DVD release dates				Bonus features
Season	Episodes	Region 1	Region 2	Region 4	Discs	Bonus features
1	15	September 2, 2014	April 27, 2015	April 2, 2015	4	Chicago Fire Episode "A Dark Day"—The beginning of a two-part crossover event that concludes with "8:30 PM"; "Professional Courtesy"—Bonus Episode from Chicago Fire Season One
2	23	September 1, 2015	October 26, 2015	December 3, 2015	6	Behind the Scenes; Chicago Fire Season 3 Crossover Episodes "Nobody Touches Anything", (Note: "Nobody Touches Anything" and "Chicago Crossover" are parts one and two of the crossover event that concludes with "They'll Have to Go Through Me".) "Three Bells" (Note: "Three Bells" is part one of the crossover event that concludes with "A Little Devil Complex".) and "We Called Her Jellybean" (Note: "We Called Her Jellybean" and "Daydream Believer" are parts one and three of the crossover event that continues with "The Number of Rats".); Law & Order: SVU Season 16 Crossover Episodes "Chicago Crossover" and "Daydream Believer"
3	23	September 13, 2016	October 24, 2016	October 26, 2016	6	Behind the Scenes; Chicago Fire Season 4 Crossover Episode "The Beating Heart" (Note: "The Beating Heart" and "Malignant" are parts one and two of the crossover event that concludes with "Now I'm God".); Chicago Med Season 1 Crossover Episode "Malignant"; Law & Order: SVU Season 17 Crossover Episode "Nationwide Manhunt" (Note: "Nationwide Manhunt" is part one of the crossover event that concludes with "The Song of Gregory William Yates".)
1–3	61	N/A	N/A	October 26, 2016	16	Same as individual seasons.
4	23	September 12, 2017	December 11, 2017	October 4, 2017	6	Chicago Fire Season 5 Crossover Episodes "Some Make It, Some Don't" (Note: "Some Make It, Some Don't" is part one of the crossover event that concludes with "Don't Bury This Case".) and "Deathtrap" (Note: "Deathtrap" and "Fake" are parts one and three of the crossover event that continues with "Emotional Proximity".); Chicago Justice Season 1 Crossover Episode "Fake"
5	22	September 11, 2018	October 1, 2018	October 17, 2018	6	Chicago Fire Season 6 Crossover Episode "Hiding Not Seeking" (Note: "Hiding Not Seeking" is the conclusion of the crossover event that begins with "Profiles".)
6	22	September 10, 2019	November 11, 2019	September 18, 2019	6	Chicago Fire Season 7 Crossover Episodes "Going to War" (Note: "Going to War" and "When to Let Go" are parts one and two of the crossover event that concludes with "Endings") and "What I Saw" (Note: "What I Saw" is part one of the crossover event that concludes with "Good Men".); Chicago Med Season 4 Crossover Episode "When to Let Go"
1–6	128	N/A	November 11, 2019	N/A	34	Same as individual seasons.

== See also ==
- Chicago (franchise)
- List of Chicago Fire episodes
- List of Chicago Med episodes
- List of Chicago Justice episodes
