= Chicago Justice =

American television series (2017)

- Genre: Legal drama; Crime drama
- Created by: Dick Wolf
- Developed by: Derek Haas; Michael Brandt; Matt Olmstead
- Showrunner: Michael S. Chernuchin
- Starring: Philip Winchester; Jon Seda; Joelle Carter; Monica Barbaro; Carl Weathers
- Composer: Atli Örvarsson
- Country of origin: United States
- Original language: English
- No. of seasons: 1
- No. of episodes: 13

Production
- Executive producers: Dick Wolf; Michael S. Chernuchin; Matt Olmstead; Derek Haas; Michael Brandt; Arthur W. Forney; Peter Jankowski
- Producer: Carla Corwin
- Production location: Chicago, Illinois
- Camera setup: Single-camera
- Running time: 43 minutes
- Production companies: Wolf Films; Universal Television

Original release
- Network: NBC
- Release: March 1 – May 14, 2017

Related
- Chicago Fire; Chicago Med; Chicago P.D.

Chicago Justice is an American legal drama television series created by Dick Wolf, the fourth series of the Chicago franchise. It stars Philip Winchester, Jon Seda, Joelle Carter, Monica Barbaro, and Carl Weathers. It aired on NBC from March 1 to May 14, 2017. A backdoor pilot aired on May 11, 2016, as part of the third season of Chicago P.D. before being ordered to series. The show follows the prosecutors and investigators at the Cook County State's Attorney's Office as they navigate their way through Chicago area politics, the legal arena, and media coverage while pursuing justice.

On May 22, 2017, NBC canceled the series after one season, making it the first series in the Chicago franchise to end. After the show ended, Philip Winchester's character Peter Stone became a regular on Law & Order: Special Victims Unit where Chernuchin became showrunner, while Jon Seda's character Antonio Dawson returned to Chicago P.D. The show averaged a 1.5 rating (adults 18–49, Live+7) in comparison to 1.9 for Chicago P.D. and Chicago Med, with Chicago Fire receiving a 2.3 rating that season. Despite the show performing marginally better than Shades of Blue and Taken, NBC executives stated it was canceled due to sustainability and space for other programs.

== Premise ==
Set in Chicago, Chicago Justice follows the State's Attorney team of prosecutors and investigators who work to bring justice to victims.

== Cast and characters ==
=== Main ===
- Philip Winchester as Assistant State's Attorney Peter Stone, the Deputy Bureau Chief of the State's Attorney's Office Special Prosecutions Bureau. His father is Benjamin Stone, an assistant district attorney in New York City. Stone would later become the ADA of the sex crimes bureau in New York. He previously played professional baseball in the Chicago Cubs organization but an injury ended his career.
- Jon Seda as Chief Investigator Antonio Dawson. Before joining the State's Attorney's office, he worked as a detective in the 21st District with the Chicago P.D..
- Joelle Carter as Investigator Laura Nagel. Also, a former Chicago police officer like Dawson, Nagel left the force and developed an addiction to painkillers after a line-of-duty injury. She has been clean for months and is struggling to regain custody of her daughter.
- Monica Barbaro as Assistant State's Attorney Anna Valdez, Stone's second chair.
- Carl Weathers as Cook County State's Attorney Mark Jefferies. He served as a Marine during the Vietnam War.

=== Recurring ===
- Lindsey Pearlman as Joy Fletcher
- Matthew C. Yee as Ronnie Chen
- Tyrone Phillips as Tyrone Jones
- Tim Kazurinsky as Judge Emerson
- Gary Basaraba as William O'Boyle
- James Vincent Meredith as Judge
- Rammel Chan as Virgil Li
- John Lu as Clerk

== Episodes ==
=== Backdoor pilot (2016) ===
No. overall	No. in season	Title	Directed by	Written by	Original release date	Prod. code	U.S. viewers (millions)
59	21	"Justice"	Jean de Segonzac	Story by : Dick Wolf; Teleplay by : Michael Brandt & Derek Haas & Matt Olmstead	May 11, 2016	321	6.75

=== Season 1 (2017) ===
No.	Title	Directed by	Written by	Original release date	Prod. code	U.S. viewers (millions)
1	"Fake"	Donald Petrie	Michael S. Chernuchin	March 1, 2017	101	8.73
Assistant State's Attorney Peter Stone and Chief Investigator Antonio Dawson prepare to prosecute the suspect responsible for the warehouse fire. When the suspect's supposed confession is deemed inadmissible and the defense prevents a cross-examination of the defendant by Stone, the State's Attorney's office must find a motive and bring justice to both the victims and their families. This episode concludes a crossover with Chicago Fire and Chicago P.D. that begins on "Deathtrap" and continues on "Emotional Proximity." It is included on the Chicago Fire Season 5 and Chicago P.D. Season 4 DVD sets.
2	"Uncertainty Principle"	Norberto Barba	William N. Fordes	March 5, 2017	102	7.21
After a suspect dies in custody, Dawson is put into an uncomfortable situation when the State's Attorney's office begins accusing Officer Kevin Atwater (guest star LaRoyce Hawkins) of using excessive force when apprehending the man accused of drug dealing. Subsequently, Stone is forced to charge Atwater with murder.
3	"See Something"	Fred Berner	Story by : Dick Wolf & Michael S. Chernuchin; Teleplay by : Michael S. Chernuchin	March 7, 2017	103	6.07
The State's Attorney's office is in a sensitive situation when a Muslim graduate student is found brutally murdered. Stone and Valdez try to convict a prejudiced frat member but find he was set up, leading Dawson and Nagel to arrest the victim's best friend. During the trial, the best friend admits to the killing, but claims it was because he found out the victim was plotting a major terrorist attack, leaving Stone and Valdez to question whether this was a heroic act or a cold-blooded homicide.
4	"Judge Not"	Elodie Keene	April Fitzsimmons	March 12, 2017	104	6.42
Valdez is in hot water when she witnesses the murder of a popular judge after having drinks with him at a bar. Stone questions Valdez's relationship with the victim and, when she does not give him a straight answer, he refuses to allow her to work the case. In court, the team unearths the killer as the ex-husband of a rape victim whose attacker was given a lenient sentence by the judge.
5	"Friendly Fire"	Stephen Cragg	Richard Sweren & April Fitzsimmons	March 19, 2017	105	5.74
The team investigates the brutal murder of a Navy SEAL veteran. Stone and Valdez discover at the autopsy that the victim ingested a flash drive containing classified information about a botched Navy mission in which he was involved. Jeffries, a military veteran, forbids Stone from using the video as evidence, causing friction between the two.
6	"Dead Meat"	Eriq La Salle	Lawrence Kaplow	March 26, 2017	106	5.84
Dawson and Nagel investigate the murder of a Chicago police officer. They initially ruled it a suicide because the officer had cancer, but the medical examiner found that the victim had a broken neck. Stone and Valdez determine that the prime suspect was previously exonerated for deadly arson.
7	"Double Helix"	Donald Petrie	Elizabeth Rinehart	April 2, 2017	107	5.91
Nagel and Dawson are disturbed when they investigate the brutal murder of a pregnant woman whose unborn baby was cut from her stomach. Stone and Valdez begin to prosecute the person involved. Soon after, the evidence points to the killer being related to a serial killer that Stone put away. Meanwhile, Nagel files a petition for joint custody of her daughter.
8	"Lily's Law"	Donald Petrie	Allison Intrieri	April 9, 2017	108	5.53
After a guilty verdict is handed down, a juror on the case is found dead in a lake. The team investigates and discovers that she actually committed suicide because she was being cyber stalked and heavily harassed. Stone does everything in his power to bring the person responsible to justice.
9	"Comma"	Alex Zakrzewski	Michael S. Chernuchin & Allison Intrieri	April 16, 2017	109	4.93
The State's Attorney's office investigates the murder of a college student, and their prime suspect is a college student who was acquitted of murdering her boyfriend in Spain. Stone digs deeper and thinks it might not be her.
10	"Drill"	Vincent Misiano	Richard Sweren	April 23, 2017	110	5.63
An innocent child is caught in the crossfire of an escalating gang war. The State's Attorney's office investigates and discovers that both gangs use social media to fuel their battles. Stone makes a controversial decision to try to shut off the members' smartphones.
11	"AQD"	Victor Nelli Jr.	Lawrence Kaplow & Elizabeth Rinehart	April 30, 2017	111	6.15
The team investigates the murder of an Anti-Environmental Alderman who was murdered in a hit and run accident. Dawson and Nagel try to find the person responsible but have trouble finding any witnesses. Valdez discovers that the driver was a mother frantically trying to find her kidnapped daughter, but later finds out it was a scam. Meanwhile, Dawson runs into Sylvie Brett (guest star Kara Killmer) during the investigation and thinks about their former relationship.
12	"Fool Me Twice"	Martha Mitchell	Bill Chais & William N. Fordes	May 7, 2017	112	5.35
The team investigates the shooting of a man left for dead, but is road blocked by detectives (guest star Dylan Walsh) working the same case. Later, Nagel reveals that the victim was her confidential informant, and Stone bars her from working the case because she is too close to it.
13	"Tycoon"	Fred Berner	Bill Chais	May 14, 2017	113	5.73
The State's Attorney's office investigates a deadly crane accident that took out half a building and killed a man below in his car. Nagel grows suspicious when the victim is identified to be the son-in-law of a powerful real estate developer who owns the building that collapsed.

== Production ==
=== Development ===
The show was confirmed on January 21 during the 2016 Television Critics Association winter press tour, with the working title Chicago Law. By March 11, the title was changed to Chicago Justice. Filming began on March 28 for the backdoor pilot that aired on May 11 as the 21st episode of the third season of Chicago P.D. The pilot is partially based on historical events and is based on a true story. On May 12, 2016, a day after the backdoor pilot aired on Chicago P.D., NBC gave the show a series order. The series premiered on March 1, 2017, concluding a crossover with Chicago Fire and Chicago P.D. It then ran in its scheduled time slot beginning March 5, 2017.

=== Casting ===
Philip Winchester was the first to be cast on February 19, 2016, as Peter Stone, the prosecutor who put Voight in prison years ago. His father is Benjamin Stone, an assistant district attorney on the first four seasons of Law & Order. Nazneen Contractor joined the series on March 11, 2016, and Joelle Carter on March 14, 2016. Rocky alum Carl Weathers joined the cast on March 19 as Cook County State's Attorney Mark Jefferies, while Ryan-James Hatanaka was added to the cast on March 24. Lorraine Toussaint reprised her role in the pilot as defense attorney Shambala Green, who appeared in seven episodes of Law & Order. Contractor exited the show on July 7, 2016, to join the cast of the CBS police procedural drama Ransom. On August 25, 2016, Monica Barbaro was added to the cast. On September 28, it was reported that Jon Seda's character Antonio Dawson would move from P.D. to Justice, where Antonio would become an investigator for the State's Attorney's office. With this move, Hatanaka departed the series. Richard Brooks reprised his Law & Order role of Paul Robinette in the episode "Uncertainty Principle". Tovah Feldshuh appeared on the premiere episode as her Law & Order character Danielle Melnick who has become a judge.

== Reception ==
=== Critical response ===
The review aggregation website Rotten Tomatoes reported a 70% approval rating, with an average rating of 5.21 out of 10 based on 10 reviews. The website's critical consensus reads: "Chicago Justice's first season won't sway procedural nonbelievers, but for fans of the franchise, it marks another solid entry that should satisfy faithful viewers and newcomers alike." On Metacritic, which uses a weighted average, the show scored 57 out of 100, based on 9 critics, indicating "mixed or average reviews".

=== Ratings ===
==== Overall ====
Viewership and ratings per season of Chicago Justice
Season	Timeslot (ET)	Episodes	First aired		Last aired		TV season	Viewership rank	Avg. viewers (millions)	18–49 rank	Avg. 18–49 rating
Season	Timeslot (ET)	Episodes	Date	Viewers (millions)	Date	Viewers (millions)	TV season	Viewership rank	Avg. viewers (millions)	18–49 rank	Avg. 18–49 rating
1	Wednesday 10:00 p.m. (1); Sunday 9:00 p.m. (2, 4–13); Tuesday 10:00 p.m. (3)	13	March 1, 2017	8.73	May 14, 2017	5.73	2016–17	TBD	TBD	TBD	TBD

==== Season 1 ====
Viewership and ratings per episode of Chicago Justice
No.	Title	Air date	Rating/share (18–49)	Viewers (millions)	DVR (18–49)	DVR viewers (millions)	Total (18–49)	Total viewers (millions)
1	"Fake"	March 1, 2017	1.7/7	8.73	—N/a	—N/a	—N/a	—N/a
2	"Uncertainty Principle"	March 5, 2017	1.4/4	7.21	—N/a	—N/a	—N/a	—N/a
3	"See Something"	March 7, 2017	1.3/5	6.07	0.7	3.22	2.0	9.28
4	"Judge Not"	March 12, 2017	1.2/4	6.42	—N/a	2.34	—N/a	8.77
5	"Friendly Fire"	March 19, 2017	1.0/4	5.74	0.6	2.64	1.6	8.38
6	"Dead Meat"	March 26, 2017	1.0/4	5.84	0.6	2.65	1.6	8.49
7	"Double Helix"	April 2, 2017	0.9/3	5.91	0.6	2.59	1.5	8.50
8	"Lily's Law"	April 9, 2017	1.0/4	5.53	—N/a	2.50	—N/a	8.03
9	"Comma"	April 16, 2017	0.9/3	4.93	0.6	2.69	1.5	7.61
10	"Drill"	April 23, 2017	1.0/4	5.63	0.5	2.38	1.5	8.01
11	"AQD"	April 30, 2017	1.1/4	6.15	—N/a	—N/a	—N/a	—N/a
12	"Fool Me Twice"	May 7, 2017	1.0/4	5.35	—N/a	2.43	—N/a	7.78
13	"Tycoon"	May 14, 2017	1.1/4	5.73	—N/a	2.48	—N/a	8.20

== Home media ==
The Complete First Season
Set details			Special features
13 episodes; 556 minutes (Region 1); 3-disc set; 1.78:1 aspect ratio; Languages: English (Dolby Digital 5.1); Spanish (Dolby Digital 5.1); Subtitles: English (Region 1); French (Region 1); Spanish (Region 1)			Chicago Fire Season 5 Crossover Episode - "Deathtrap"; Chicago P.D. Season 4 Crossover Episode - "Emotional Proximity"
Release dates			Chicago Fire Season 5 Crossover Episode - "Deathtrap"; Chicago P.D. Season 4 Crossover Episode - "Emotional Proximity"
United States	United Kingdom	Australia	Chicago Fire Season 5 Crossover Episode - "Deathtrap"; Chicago P.D. Season 4 Crossover Episode - "Emotional Proximity"
September 12, 2017	September 25, 2017	February 7, 2018	Chicago Fire Season 5 Crossover Episode - "Deathtrap"; Chicago P.D. Season 4 Crossover Episode - "Emotional Proximity"

== See also ==
- Chicago (franchise)
- List of Chicago Fire episodes
- List of Chicago Med episodes
- List of Chicago P.D. episodes
