= Benjamin Levy Aguilar =

Guatemalan-American actor

- Born: June 19, 1993 (age 33)
- Occupation: Actor
- Years active: 2014–present

Benjamin Levy Aguilar (born 1993) is a Guatemalan-American actor, best known for playing Officer Dante Torres in the TV series Chicago P.D. on NBC. He debuted in the role in 2022.

== Life and career ==
Aguilar was born and grew up in Guatemala. He described his childhood as "not so much growing up or living there, but surviving," with his escape and passion being soccer. As a teenager he was scouted by AC Milan for their youth team in Italy, but a femur fracture forced him to return to Guatemala, where he trained in the self-defense sport Krav Maga, in which he earned a black belt.

At 18, he moved to Los Angeles to study acting, after his mother gave gave him a one-way plane ticket and told him "don't come back until you make it." He eventually got several small parts before landing a role as Antonio Rivera in Fox's 2020 series Filthy Rich. In 2022, he played the character Rex in Netflix’s dark comedy miniseries The Woman in the House Across the Street from the Girl in the Window.

In 2019, Aguilar played a minor role on the TV series Chicago P.D., Season 7, Episode 1 (2019). He later was added to the main cast as Officer Dante Torres, debuting in Season 9, Episode 18 (2022), entitled "New Guard". His character was introduced as a "broody young cop." He has been a regular since then.

Aguilar and fellow cast member Arienne Mandi ("Officer Eva Imani") knew each other and were friends before being on the show, initially from a Jiu-Jitsu class in 2020 in Los Angeles.

== Selected Filmography ==
Filmography credits from IMDb

=== Film ===
Year	Title	Role	Notes
2016	Special Norm	Drama student (credited as Benjamin Levy)	
2017	My Life For Yours	Juan Ramirez (credited as Benjamin Levy)	
2019	Cultural Clash	-	
2019	Before the Dawn	Jason's friend (credited as Benjamin Levy)	
2023	Hiding Places	Florian	

=== Television ===
Year	Title	Role	Notes
2014	Out The Box	Levy (credited as Benjamin Levy)	1 episode
2015	Aloha Haha	Ben Bleu	3 episodes
2020	Filthy Rich	Antonio Rivera	10 episodes
2022	The Woman in the House Across the Street from the Girl in the Window	Rex Bakke	3 episodes
2026	Chicago Med	Dante Torres	1 episode
2019, 2022-2026	Chicago P.D.	Franco Chavaro (2019, 1 episode); Dante Torres (2022-)	Main cast
