= Chicago P.D. season 3 =

Chicago P.D.
- Season 3
- Chicago P.D. Season 3 DVD cover
- Showrunners: Matt Olmstead; Michael Brandt; Derek Haas
- No. of episodes: 23

Release
- Original network: NBC
- Original release: September 30, 2015 – May 25, 2016

Season chronology
- ← Previous; Season 2 Next → Season 4

The third season of Chicago P.D., an American police drama television series with executive producer Dick Wolf, and producers Derek Haas, Michael Brandt, and Matt Olmstead, was ordered on February 5, 2015. It premiered on September 30, 2015, and concluded on May 25, 2016. The season contained 23 episodes.

== Cast ==
=== Regular ===
- Jason Beghe as Sergeant Henry "Hank" Voight
- Jon Seda as Detective Antonio Dawson
- Sophia Bush as Detective Erin Lindsay
- Jesse Lee Soffer as Detective Jay Halstead
- Patrick John Flueger as Officer Adam Ruzek
- Marina Squerciati as Officer Kim Burgess
- LaRoyce Hawkins as Officer Kevin Atwater
- Amy Morton as Desk Sergeant Trudy Platt
- Brian Geraghty as Officer Sean Roman
- Elias Koteas as Detective Alvin Olinsky

=== Recurring ===
- Samuel Hunt as Greg "Mouse" Gerwitz
- Madison McLaughlin as Michelle Sovana
- Charisma Carpenter as Brianna Logan
- Markie Post as Barbara "Bunny" Fletcher
- Barbara Eve Harris as Deputy Chief/Commander Emma Crowley
- James McDaniel as Captain James Whitaker
- Kevin J. O'Connor as Commander Fischer
- Josh Segarra as Justin Voight
- Chris Agos as Assistant State's Attorney Steve Kot

=== Special guest ===
- Philip Winchester as Assistant State's Attorney Peter Stone
- Nazneen Contractor as Assistant State's Attorney Dawn Patel
- Joelle Carter as Investigator Laura Nagel
- Ryan-James Hatanaka as Investigator Daren Okada
- Lorraine Toussaint as Defense Attorney Shambala Green
- Carl Weathers as State's Attorney Mark Jefferies
- Clancy Brown as Eddie Little
- Andrea Susan Bush as Vikky

=== Crossover characters ===
- Mariska Hargitay as Lieutenant Olivia Benson
- Ice-T as Detective Fin Tutuola
- Nick Gehlfuss as Dr. Will Halstead
- Torrey DeVitto as Dr. Natalie Manning
- Rachel DiPillo as Sarah Reese
- Colin Donnell as Dr. Connor Rhodes
- Brian Tee as Dr. Ethan Choi
- S. Epatha Merkerson as Sharon Goodwin
- Oliver Platt as Dr. Daniel Charles
- Marlyne Barrett as Maggie Lockwood
- Taylor Kinney as Lieutenant Kelly Severide
- Monica Raymund as Firefighter Gabriela Dawson
- David Eigenberg as Firefighter Christopher Herrmann
- Yuri Sardarov as Firefighter Brian "Otis" Zvonecek
- Eamonn Walker as Battalion Chief Wallace Boden
- Joe Minoso as Firefighter Joe Cruz
- Christian Stolte as Firefighter Randy "Mouch" McHolland
- Steven R. McQueen as Candidate Jimmy Borelli
- Brian J. White as Captain Dallas Patterson
- Randy Flagler as Firefighter Harold Capp
- Anthony Ferraris as Firefighter Tony
- Andy Ahrens as Firefighter Danny Borelli

== Episodes ==
No. overall	No. in season	Title	Directed by	Written by	Original release date	Prod. code	U.S. viewers (millions)
39	1	"Life Is Fluid"	Arthur W. Forney	Craig Gore & Tim Walsh	September 30, 2015	301	6.65
The Intelligence unit tracks down one of Chicago's most wanted fugitives, which leads to Halstead being abducted and tortured when the leader of the group responsible wants the identities of all of Intelligence's confidential informants as ransom. Meanwhile, Lindsay continues to make bad choices, but gets called in by Olinsky to help Halstead. Also, Olinsky opens up to Platt about his secret daughter, while Roman shows concerns about Burgess' engagement to Adam.
40	2	"Natural Born Storyteller"	Mark Tinker	Mike Weiss	October 7, 2015	302	6.49
Burgess and Roman discover a child found murdered in an abandoned house while on a call. Meanwhile, Voight asks Halstead to keep an eye on Lindsay as she continues her recovery. Also, Burgess questions Roman about a needle she found in Roman's jacket, and Olinsky tries to get closer to his newly discovered daughter.
41	3	"Actual Physical Violence"	Fred Berner	Eduardo Javier Canto & Ryan Maldonado	October 14, 2015	303	6.58
A man whose daughter is missing takes a member of the team hostage. In other events, Voight learns that Bunny has made new accusations regarding an old case; and Antonio is shocked by a secret that Olinsky has been keeping.
42	4	"Debts of the Past"	Rohn Schmidt	Michael Brandt & Derek Haas	October 21, 2015	304	6.24
The team goes after an ex-con who murdered an officer and tried to take out Voight and his family. Elsewhere, Burgess starts to have doubts about her engagement to Adam after finding out that he has been engaged more than twice. Also, Olinsky continues to bond with his new daughter.
43	5	"Climbing Into Bed"	Mark Tinker	Cole Maliska	October 28, 2015	305	6.14
Ruzek finds himself in hot water when his unauthorized undercover operation ends with a missing gun-wielding psychopath on the loose, a restaurant owner's wife dead and more questions than answers. While on suspension, Ruzek struggles with guilt after his CI is found dead. Lindsay moves back into her apartment for good.
44	6	"You Never Know Who's Who"	Lin Oeding	Craig Gore & Tim Walsh	October 28, 2015	306	6.14
Burgess and her rookie find a dead man with supposed links to the CIA inside his bullet and bomb-proof SUV. At the man's home they find a bunker with a large supply of weapons. When the man's body is stolen from the morgue they catch a man who claims to be CIA and working as part of a domestic program called "Street Cleaner". It is found that the man, whom they identified as Victor Cullen, was in fact CIA but several years before and only for a short while before suffering a mental breakdown. He had in fact been diagnosed as delusional and had used a large inheritance to fund his personal team of pseudo-CIA agents, information Dr. Daniel Charles of Chicago Med later reveals to the team. The captured man leads them to the other two "agents" with Olinsky posing as a contact from CIA headquarters. At the meeting one of the men is killed and another is apprehended after Atwater disables his special SUV using a city snowplow. Meanwhile, Ruzek's career is saved when Platt calls in a favor on his behalf, and Halstead and Lindsay take their relationship to the next level.
45	7	"A Dead Kid, a Notebook and a Lot of Maybes"	Charlotte Brändström	Timothy J. Sexton	November 4, 2015	307	6.48
The Unit investigates the death of a prep school student who was planning to bomb his school. They track down his partner and eventually uncover that the boys were molested by their swim coach and only planned to get back at him by blowing up his car. It is found that the dead student was in fact murdered by a man hired by the swim coach to cover up his crimes. The case gets personal for Halstead and he bonds with the young victim. Meanwhile, Olinsky's wife throws him out over his refusal to abandon his new daughter, leading him to move in with Ruzek, interrupting a date with Burgess. Also, Atwater tries to get in good with a legendary police captain from another district.
46	8	"Forget My Name"	Nick Gomez	Mike Weiss	November 11, 2015	308	6.79
The Intelligence Unit receive a tip from a reliable source about a major drug trade which also leads into a murder investigation of a government official. Meanwhile, Mouch asks Burgess for Platt's ring size so he could surprise her with a marriage proposal.
47	9	"Never Forget I Love You"	Terry Miller	Story by : Ryan Maldonado & Eduardo Javier Canto; Teleplay by : Craig Gore & Tim Walsh	November 18, 2015	309	6.47
The team investigates a body of a stripper found in Lake Michigan who has connections to Voight's social circle in Chicago and causes tension between him and Lindsay. It was later revealed that the victim was pregnant and it is suspected that the killer was the father of the child. Meanwhile, Roman makes a mistake that causes him to feel guilty.
48	10	"Now I'm God"	Holly Dale	Jamie Pachino	January 6, 2016	310	8.75
The case of cancer-free patients being overdosed on chemotherapy takes a turn when it is revealed that the doctor responsible treated the late wife of Voight. Distraught over this, Voight does everything he can to convict him. Meanwhile, Burgess investigates an incident that got Roman suspended. This episode concludes a crossover with Chicago Fire and Chicago Med that begins on "The Beating Heart" and continues on "Malignant". It is included on the Chicago Fire Season 4 and Chicago Med Season 1 DVD sets.
49	11	"Knocked the Family Right Out"	Mark Tinker	Mo Masi	January 13, 2016	311	7.99
The team investigates a home invasion in which the suspects put a gas in the house and knocked the victims out. The investigation turns into a rape case because one of the female victims was raped by one of the suspects. When the Chicago P.D. believes they have caught a suspect, another home invasion occurs and the female is raped again. Lindsay questions the victim, which leads to a trap and Lindsay is kidnapped. Meanwhile, Voight helps his old cellmate restart his life after he is released from prison.
50	12	"Looking Out for Stateville"	Fred Berner	Craig Gore & Tim Walsh	January 20, 2016	312	6.52
The Intelligence unit investigates and tries to break up a cocaine ring with the help of Voight's old cellmate who makes him a personal C.I. for the unit. Meanwhile, Burgess starts to have doubts about marrying Adam after Adam stays at work instead of meeting Burgess' mother. Also, Platt experiences stress from planning her upcoming wedding.
51	13	"Hit Me"	Rohn Schmidt	Mike Weiss & Cole Maliska	February 3, 2016	313	7.22
Lindsay and Halstead go undercover to bust a group of men who impersonate police officers and assault women who win money at a casino. Meanwhile, Burgess requests a transfer following her breakup with Ruzek.
52	14	"The Song of Gregory Williams Yates"	Michael Grossman	Jamie Pachino	February 10, 2016	314	8.28
Gregory Yates, the man who murdered Lindsay's friend Nadia, has escaped from a New York state prison and fled to Chicago to continue his killing spree. Voight does everything he can to keep Lindsay from getting too close to the case. Olivia Benson (guest star Mariska Hargitay) and Fin (guest star Ice-T) from New York's SVU assist with the case. This episode concludes a crossover with Law & Order: Special Victims Unit that begins on "Nationwide Manhunt". It is included on the Law & Order: Special Victims Unit Season 17 DVD set.
53	15	"A Night Owl"	Nick Gomez	Timothy J. Sexton	February 17, 2016	315	7.45
Burgess is called up to the intelligence unit following her bust of a college professor (guest star Richard Thomas) trying to smuggle ten kilos of heroin to Canada. Platt helps out Roman to become a Field Training Officer, and Mouse sets Halstead up with a security job at a medical marijuana clinic.
54	16	"The Cases that Need to Be Solved"	Jean de Segonzac	Matt Olmstead	February 24, 2016	316	6.99
The city of Chicago is shaken when the Intelligence unit investigates the murder of a six-year old African American boy. After another shooting in gang territory, Mouse, Lindsay and Halstead search for evidence of a connection between the two shootings.
55	17	"Forty-Caliber Bread Crumb"	Jann Turner	Craig Gore & Tim Walsh	March 2, 2016	317	7.17
Halstead's part-time security job is ambushed by masked gunmen shooting at them while on a bank run. The intelligence unit launches a full-scale investigation into the firm.
56	18	"Kasual with a K"	David Rodriguez	Eduardo Javier Canto & Ryan Maldonado	March 23, 2016	318	6.27
The team investigate the kidnapping of women at a secret shelter. Meanwhile, Burgess and Roman go undercover to retrieve stolen items from a man at a motel.
57	19	"If We Were Normal"	Mark Tinker	Mo Masi	March 30, 2016	319	6.79
The team investigates a real estate agent who kidnaps women and rapes them. Meanwhile, Roman fills in for Platt as acting desk Sergeant as she continues to plan her wedding.
58	20	"In a Duffel Bag"	Nick Gomez	Jamie Pachino	May 4, 2016	320	6.32
The Intelligence members are horrified to discover an abandoned newborn left out in the freezing weather, and are determined to bring those responsible to justice. Meanwhile, Voight is surprised to discover that his son is in town, Platt returns following her wedding and Burgess and Roman's romantic relationship continues to develop.
59	21	"Justice"	Jean de Segonzac	Story by : Dick Wolf; Teleplay by : Michael Brandt & Derek Haas & Matt Olmstead	May 11, 2016	321	6.75
After a hooded man opens fire on their patrol car while they're sharing a clandestine, intimate moment, Roman is left wounded and Burgess takes off after the shooter and shoots when she finds him turning in her direction with a glimmer of silver in his hand. No gun has been found at the crime scene and the shooter is identified as a 17-year-old African American teenager. Assistant State Attorney Peter Stone, who sent Voight to prison, and his team need to collect enough evidence to indict the teen and clear Burgess, but must tread with caution on this high profile case as tensions run high, and Roman and Burgess's illicit affair is revealed. This episode serves as a backdoor pilot for the spin-off series Chicago Justice.
60	22	"She's Got Us"	Lin Oeding	Mike Weiss	May 18, 2016	322	6.93
While responding to a call of shots fired at a family residence, Lindsay and Halstead discover the only survivor is the youngest daughter who is traumatized. While Lindsay and Dr. Charles evaluate the girl and see if she can help identify the killer, Antonio and Olinsky look into a pyramid scheme "self-help" group for potential suspects. Meanwhile, Platt tries to make a case to Commander Crowley for Burgess and Roman to remain partners despite their ongoing sexual relationship.
61	23	"Start Digging"	Mark Tinker	Craig Gore & Tim Walsh	May 25, 2016	323	6.88
The Intelligence unit investigates the murder of a widowed mother. During the investigation it is discovered that she has been in contact with Voight's son Justin. Meanwhile, being taken off the beat following his accident, Roman decides to quit the force and move to San Diego and wants Burgess to go with him. Voight is offered a meritorious promotion to Lieutenant, but a vicious assault on someone close to him results in him risking his career to take justice into his own hands.

== Production ==
A three-way crossover between Chicago Fire, Chicago Med and Chicago P.D. aired on January 5 and 6, 2016. A crossover with Law & Order: Special Victims Unit aired on February 10, 2016, where Intelligence helps SVU track down Greg Yates after he escapes from prison in New York.

== Ratings ==
Viewership and ratings per episode of Chicago P.D. season 3
No.	Title	Air date	Rating/share (18–49)	Viewers (millions)	DVR (18–49)	DVR viewers (millions)	Total (18–49)	Total viewers (millions)
1	"Life Is Fluid"	September 30, 2015	1.7/6	6.65	1.0	3.27	2.7	9.93
2	"Natural Born Storyteller"	October 7, 2015	1.5/5	6.49	1.0	3.14	2.5	9.62
3	"Actual Physical Violence"	October 14, 2015	1.5/5	6.58	1.0	3.07	2.5	9.65
4	"Debts of the Past"	October 21, 2015	1.4/4	6.24	1.1	3.41	2.5	9.65
5	"Climbing Into Bed"	October 28, 2015	1.5/5	6.14	1.0	3.27	2.5	9.41
6	"You Never Know Who's Who"	October 28, 2015	1.5/5	6.14	1.0	3.27	2.5	9.41
7	"A Dead Kid, a Notebook and a Lot of Maybes"	November 4, 2015	1.4/5	6.48	1.2	3.61	2.6	10.09
8	"Forget My Name"	November 11, 2015	1.6/5	6.79	1.2	3.65	2.8	10.44
9	"Never Forget I Love You"	November 18, 2015	1.4/5	6.47	1.1	3.49	2.5	9.96
10	"Now I'm God"	January 6, 2016	1.9/6	8.75	1.2	4.06	3.1	12.81
11	"Knocked the Family Right Out"	January 13, 2016	2.0/7	7.99	1.0	3.46	3.0	11.48
12	"Looking Out for Stateville"	January 20, 2016	1.5/5	6.52	1.0	3.47	2.5	9.97
13	"Hit Me"	February 3, 2016	1.7/6	7.22	1.0	3.56	2.7	10.78
14	"The Song of Gregory Williams Yates"	February 10, 2016	2.0/7	8.28	1.4	4.45	3.4	12.70
15	"A Night Owl"	February 17, 2016	1.6/6	7.45	1.1	3.66	2.7	11.11
16	"The Cases that Need to be Solved"	February 24, 2016	1.6/6	6.99	1.1	3.72	2.7	10.70
17	"Forty-Caliber Bread Crumb"	March 2, 2016	1.5/5	7.17	1.2	3.80	2.7	10.97
18	"Kasual with a K"	March 23, 2016	1.4/5	6.27	1.2	3.84	2.6	9.97
19	"If We Were Normal"	March 30, 2016	1.5/5	6.79	1.1	3.75	2.6	10.52
20	"In a Duffel Bag"	May 4, 2016	1.3/4	6.32	1.0	3.36	2.3	9.68
21	"Justice"	May 11, 2016	1.4/5	6.75	1.0	3.30	2.4	10.05
22	"She's Got Us"	May 18, 2016	1.4/5	6.93	1.1	3.54	2.5	10.47
23	"Start Digging"	May 25, 2016	1.4/5	6.88	1.0	3.48	2.4	10.32

== Home media ==
The DVD release of season three was released in Region 1 on September 13, 2016.

The Complete Third Season
Set details			Special features
23 episodes; 1102 minutes (Region 1); 6-disc set; 1.78:1 aspect ratio; Languages: English (Dolby Digital 5.1); Spanish (Dolby Digital 5.1); Subtitles: English (Region 1); Spanish (Region 1)			Behind the Scenes; Chicago Fire Season 4 Crossover Episode - "The Beating Heart"; Chicago Med Season 1 Crossover Episode - "Malignant"; Law & Order: SVU Season 17 Crossover Episode - "Nationwide Manhunt"
Release dates			Behind the Scenes; Chicago Fire Season 4 Crossover Episode - "The Beating Heart"; Chicago Med Season 1 Crossover Episode - "Malignant"; Law & Order: SVU Season 17 Crossover Episode - "Nationwide Manhunt"
United States	United Kingdom	Australia	Behind the Scenes; Chicago Fire Season 4 Crossover Episode - "The Beating Heart"; Chicago Med Season 1 Crossover Episode - "Malignant"; Law & Order: SVU Season 17 Crossover Episode - "Nationwide Manhunt"
September 13, 2016	October 24, 2016	October 26, 2016	Behind the Scenes; Chicago Fire Season 4 Crossover Episode - "The Beating Heart"; Chicago Med Season 1 Crossover Episode - "Malignant"; Law & Order: SVU Season 17 Crossover Episode - "Nationwide Manhunt"
