= Chicago P.D. season 14 =

Chicago P.D.
- Season 14
- Showrunner: Gwen Sigan
- Starring: Jason Beghe; Marina Squerciati; Patrick John Flueger; LaRoyce Hawkins; Benjamin Levy Aguilar; Arienne Mandi; Amy Morton
- No. of episodes: 7

Release
- Original network: NBC
- Original release: October 7, 2026 – present

Season chronology
- ← Previous; Season 13

The fourteenth season of Chicago P.D., an American drama television series with the executive producer Dick Wolf, was ordered on March 27, 2026 and began airing on October 7, 2026.

== Cast and characters ==
=== Main ===
- Jason Beghe as Sergeant Henry "Hank" Voight
- Marina Squerciati as Detective Kim Burgess
- Patrick John Flueger as Officer Adam Ruzek
- LaRoyce Hawkins as Officer Kevin Atwater (episodes 1-2)
- Benjamin Levy Aguilar as Officer Dante Torres
- Arienne Mandi as Officer Eva Imani
- Amy Morton as Desk Sergeant Trudy Platt

=== Recurring ===
- Kyle Selig as FBI Agent Charlie Boyden

== Episodes ==
No. overall	No. in season	Title	Directed by	Written by	Original release date	Prod. code	U.S. viewers (millions)
265	1	"Demolition"	Chad Saxton	Gwen Sigan & Gavin Harris	October 7, 2026	1401	3.98
266	2	"Don't Blink"	Jesse Lee Soffer	Gwen Sigan	October 14, 2026	1402	4.03
267	3	"Under the Surface"	Takashi Doscher	Jonathan Abrahams	October 21, 2026	1403	3.66
268	4	"My Eye, My Call"	Chad Saxton	Edgar Castillo & Gwen Sigan	October 28, 2026	1404	3.59
269	5	"Dark Imaginings"	Victor Macias	Gavin Harris	November 4, 2026	1405	3.95
270	6	"The Thin Grey Line"	Chris Grismer	D. Dona Le	November 11, 2026	1406	4.09
271	7	"Persons Yet Unknown"	Chad Saxton	Matthew Browne	November 18, 2026	1407	3.47

== Production ==
=== Casting ===
Jason Beghe was confirmed to have signed a new deal in May 2026. In July 2026 it was announced that original cast member LaRoyce Hawkins was exiting the series in the first two episodes of the season.

=== Behind the Scenes ===
Former cast member Jesse Lee Soffer, who played Jay Halstead, has been confirmed to be returning to direct the second episode of the season. Soffer has previously directed episodes in Seasons 10, 11 and 13.

== Ratings ==
Viewership and ratings per episode of Chicago P.D. season 14
No.	Title	Air date	Rating (18–49)	Viewers (millions)	DVR (18–49)	DVR viewers (millions)	Total (18–49)	Total viewers (millions)	Ref.
1	"Demolition"	October 7, 2026	0.3	3.98	TBD	TBD	TBD	TBD	
2	"Don't Blink"	October 14, 2026	0.3	4.03	TBD	TBD	TBD	TBD	
3	"Under the Surface"	October 21, 2026	0.3	3.66	TBD	TBD	TBD	TBD	
4	"My Eye, My Call"	October 28, 2026	0.2	3.59	TBD	TBD	TBD	TBD	
5	"Dark Imaginings"	November 4, 2026	0.3	3.95	TBD	TBD	TBD	TBD	
