= Chicago P.D. (TV series) =

American television series (2014–present)

- Genre: Action; Police procedural; Crime drama
- Created by: Dick Wolf; Matt Olmstead
- Developed by: Derek Haas; Michael Brandt
- Showrunners: Matt Olmstead; Dick Wolf; Michael Brandt; Derek Haas; Rick Eid; Gwen Sigan
- Starring: Jason Beghe; Jon Seda; Sophia Bush; Jesse Lee Soffer; Patrick Flueger; Marina Squerciati; LaRoyce Hawkins; Archie Kao; Elias Koteas; Amy Morton; Brian Geraghty; Tracy Spiridakos; Lisseth Chavez; Benjamin Levy Aguilar; Toya Turner; Arienne Mandi
- Composer: Atli Örvarsson
- Country of origin: United States
- Original language: English
- No. of seasons: 14
- No. of episodes: 271 (list of episodes)

Production
- Executive producers: Dick Wolf; Matt Olmstead; Danielle Gelber; Michael Brandt; Derek Haas; Mark Tinker; Arthur W. Forney; Peter Jankowski; Rick Eid; Terry Miller; Gwen Sigan; Jason Beghe (season 10–)
- Producers: Terry Miller; Jamie Pachino; Jeremy Beim; Michele Greco; Maisha Closson; Kim Rome; Chad Saxton; Craig Cannold; Brian Luce
- Production location: Chicago, Illinois
- Camera setup: Single-camera
- Running time: 40–44 minutes
- Production companies: Wolf Entertainment (Note: Also credited as Wolf Films (2014–19).); Universal Television

Original release
- Network: NBC
- Release: January 8, 2014 – present

Related
- Chicago Fire; Chicago Justice; Chicago Med

Chicago P.D. is an American police procedural television series broadcast by NBC and created by Dick Wolf as the second installment of the Chicago franchise. It stars Jason Beghe, Jon Seda, Sophia Bush, Jesse Lee Soffer, Patrick Flueger, Marina Squerciati, LaRoyce Hawkins, Archie Kao, Elias Koteas, Amy Morton, Brian Geraghty, Tracy Spiridakos, Lisseth Chavez, Benjamin Levy Aguilar, Toya Turner, and Arienne Mandi; the series premiered on January 8, 2014. The show follows the uniformed patrol officers and the Intelligence Unit of the 21st District of the Chicago Police Department as they pursue the perpetrators of the city's major street offenses.

In March 2026, the series was renewed for a fourteenth season, which premiered on October 7, 2026.

== Plot ==
A spin-off of Chicago Fire, Chicago P.D. focuses on the fictional 21st District, which houses patrol officers and the department's elite Intelligence Unit, led by Sergeant Hank Voight (Jason Beghe) through their action-packed daily lives as they strive to keep the city peaceful. Voight must learn to adjust to a changing geopolitical context and adopt new strategies to combat crime in the city he loves.

== Cast ==
- Jason Beghe as Sergeant Henry "Hank" Voight, the enigmatic and often mercurial chief of the Chicago P.D.'s Intelligence Unit. Despite his brutal, tough exterior, he is loyal to the cops and detectives serving under him and highly "dedicated" to the victims of the crimes his unit investigates to the point of committing human rights violations, mainly torture, and not respecting the law. He is first introduced in Chicago Fire as a dirty cop who clashes with CFD Lieutenant Matthew Casey after Voight's son, Justin, causes an accident in which a teenager is paralyzed, and Casey, who was first on scene, had intended to testify that Justin was DUI. He is arrested by Det. Antonio Dawson for trying to have Casey silenced by force but is later released from prison and reinstated to the police force by Internal Affairs. As a result, many of Casey's colleagues dislike him, and Casey's superior Chief Boden has a love-hate working relationship with him. It is eventually revealed in the Chicago Fire episode "Let Her Go" that his dirty cop alter ego was part of an undercover operation to catch criminals and other dirty cops. Prior to taking command of Intelligence, Voight worked in the Gang Unit. His father Richard was a former CPD officer who was killed in the line of duty. Voight is a widower; his wife, Camille, died of cancer some years prior. His son, Justin, served in the Army and was killed in the last episode of season 3 while trying to help a friend. Voight took an interest in Erin Lindsay when she was 14 and raised her as his daughter.
- Jon Seda as Senior Detective Antonio Dawson (seasons 1–6), an Intelligence Unit detective who previously arrested Voight for harassment and has since worked alongside him. Unlike Voight, he has limits on how far he will go to get criminals off the streets, as shown by the fact that he asks Halstead to stop Voight from killing anyone while on the hunt for Pulpo because he does not want it on his conscience. He and his former wife Laura have two children: Diego and Eva. He is the older brother of Chicago Fire character Gabriela "Gabby" Dawson. In season 4, he is offered a job at the State's Attorney's Office as Lead Investigator, which he accepts. After becoming disillusioned with the job, he returns to the unit in the first episode of season 5. In season 6, Antonio struggles with recovering from a shoulder injury and dependency on the oxycodone he is taking for the pain. After a dealer he owes kidnaps, beats, and rapes his daughter, Antonio, high on oxy, kills him in revenge. Though Voight and Ruzek manage to cover up the incident as self-defense, and Antonio successfully recovers in rehab, mayor-hopeful Superintendent Brian Kelton later gets the case reopened in order to take down the Intelligence Unit, and in the season finale, Antonio relapses after Ruzek is arrested after taking the blame for everything to protect him. In the season 7 premiere, it is revealed that Voight found Antonio and checked him into an off-the-books rehab clinic to get him clean again while also protecting his career. It was revealed several episodes later that Antonio resigned and moved to Puerto Rico to spend more time with his family. He was replaced by Vanessa Rojas in season seven.
- Sophia Bush as Detective Erin Lindsay (seasons 1–4), a tough Intelligence Unit detective and former CI whom Voight took under his wing when she was a juvenile delinquent. Because of this, she is closer to Voight than the other members of the unit. She has a half-brother, Teddy Courtney, who was taken by a pedophile ring at age thirteen and was found turning tricks in New York City 10 years later. She was in a relationship with her partner Jay Halstead from seasons 2 to 4. Near the end of the fourth season, Lindsay is accused of assault after she sticks her gun down a pedophile's throat in the interrogation room; facing possible dismissal from the police force, she accepts a job offer at the FBI in New York and leaves Chicago.
- Jesse Lee Soffer as Senior Detective Jay Halstead (seasons 1–10, guest season 13), an Intelligence Unit detective who was Detective Lindsay's partner. A former Army Ranger, he is confident in his abilities and sometimes comes across as cocky. He also has post-traumatic stress disorder, shown progressively during Season 5, later seeking therapy for it. He is the younger brother of Chicago Med character Dr. Will Halstead. He was in a relationship with his partner Erin Lindsay from season 2 until she transferred to the FBI in New York at the end of season 4. He later marries fellow detective Hailey Upton in season 9. Following Olinsky's death and Antonio's resignation, Halstead becomes Voight's right-hand. He later resigns from the force early in season 10 after becoming disillusioned with the gray area the Intelligence Unit has to work in, and returns to the Army in a new job hunting drug cartels in Bolivia.
- Patrick John Flueger as Officer Adam Ruzek, a younger police officer recruited straight out of the academy by Olinsky to do undercover work. Early in the series he is often portrayed as an overeager amateur who dives headfirst into a situation without thinking. His parents are separated, and he split time between his father, "Disco Bob" Ruzek (Jack Coleman), a longtime patrol officer with the 26th District who lives in Beverly, and his mother in Canaryville. He was engaged to fellow police officer Kim Burgess before commitment issues end the engagement, but he and Burgess continue to have an on-and-off relationship over the following years, including a pregnancy and its loss (after Burgess is assaulted by a suspect) and adopting a young girl after the girl's immediate family is murdered and other relatives are unable to care for her, before finally getting engaged again in season 11.
- Marina Squerciati as Detective Kim Burgess, a former flight attendant turned uniformed patrol officer who was Atwater's partner. She was then partnered with Sean Roman before his departure. Burgess is shot in "Called in Dead" and spends the next episode recovering. She was engaged to Adam Ruzek; the relationship is later broken off because of commitment issues. She later develops feelings for Roman before he moves to San Diego. In season 4, she is offered a job in Intelligence, which she accepts. She and Ruzek continue to have an on-and-off relationship over the following years, including a pregnancy and its loss (after Burgess is assaulted by a suspect) and adopting a young girl after the girl's immediate family is murdered and other relatives are unable to care for her, before finally getting engaged again in season 11. In season 12, she is promoted to detective following the departures of Halstead and Upton and the murder of Emily Martel.
- LaRoyce Hawkins as Officer Kevin Atwater (seasons 1–14), a uniformed patrol officer who was Burgess' former partner until he was promoted to the Intelligence Unit. He is responsible for caring for his younger siblings, his brother, Jordan, and sister, Vanessa. After his brother testifies to a grand jury about a crime he witnessed, and Vanessa is threatened with rape for her brother being a snitch, he sends them to live with their aunt in Texas. He leaves the Intelligence Unit in season 14 and moves to Atlanta to teach at the police academy there after becoming a father.
- Archie Kao as Detective Sheldon Jin (season 1), a tech and surveillance expert. He was discovered to be a reluctant mole working for Internal Affairs sergeant Edwin Stillwell, who had leverage to make him cooperate. He is found murdered in the first-season finale episode, "A Beautiful Friendship".
- Elias Koteas as Senior Detective Alvin Olinsky (seasons 1–5; guest season 11), a veteran undercover officer and a friend of Voight who previously worked with him in the Gang Unit. Before joining the force, Olinsky served in the 173rd Airborne Brigade Combat Team stationed in Vicenza, Italy. Olinsky mentions in "Called in Dead" that he has eight confirmed kills in the line of duty. At the end of the fifth season, Olinsky is arrested for the murder of Kevin Bingham, the man who murdered Voight's son, Justin, and is later stabbed to death via a hit in prison while awaiting trial.
- Amy Morton as Sergeant Gertrude "Trudy" Platt (season 2 – present; recurring season 1), a sarcastic desk sergeant of District 21, and the immediate superior of the district's patrol officers. Before taking a desk job, she was a uniformed patrol officer, and worked with Dawson. She passed the detective's exam twice. Platt is married to Chicago Fire character Randy "Mouch" McHolland.
- Brian Geraghty as Officer Sean Roman (seasons 2–3; guest season 7), a brash patrol officer who partners with Burgess after transferring to the 2-1 from District 31. He transferred out because of his relationship with Jenn Cassidy (Spencer Grammer), who is now a K-9 officer, to avoid breaking fraternization rules. He has his own private security company on the side. After being wounded in the line of duty, and with the department feeling he would be unable to return to patrol, he resigns and decides to join the San Diego Police Department.
- Tracy Spiridakos as Detective Hailey Upton (seasons 5–11, guest season 13; recurring season 4), a tough former robbery-homicide detective and Erin Lindsay's replacement following her departure to New York. Upton gets transferred to the FBI field office in New York City in season 7 episode 18, "Lines", to temporarily fill in for an agent undercover. She has great relationships with her CIs and goes to many lengths to protect them. Despite a dark turn in Season 7, she is mostly a "by the book" detective. She was married to former Detective Jay Halstead, however, they have gotten divorced in the beginning of season 11. After going through several traumatic events during seasons 10 and 11, including rescuing Voight from a serial killer at the end of the latter season, she leaves Chicago PD to start fresh.
- Lisseth Chavez as Officer Vanessa Rojas (season 7), a rookie and Antonio Dawson's replacement following his resignation. She previously worked in an undercover operations unit. She leaves Intelligence after the seventh season for reasons unknown.
- Benjamin Levy Aguilar as Officer Dante Torres (season 10 – present; guest season 9), a recruit who has a complicated past and was recruited under Detective Halstead's wing.
- Toya Turner as Officer Kiana Cook (season 12), a former tactical officer demoted to patrol by her supervisor after having noted his tendencies to avoid any real work to preserve his pension. She catches the attention of Intelligence after helping catch the killer of their latest addition Detective Emily Martel, and is later recruited by Voight after helping regarding a case of teenage girls killing their abusers. She later takes a permanent position in the 17th District following the Intelligence Unit's disbandment at the end of the twelfth season.
- Arienne Mandi as Officer Eva Imani (season 13–present), a special agent from the ATF who transfers to Intelligence after helping on the case that brings the unit back from suspension.
- Naiqui Macabroad as Officer Donovan "Penny" Watts (season 14), a uniformed patrol officer who shows exceptional bravery and initiative on a case that Voight and others are involved with. Because of his actions, his relationships in the community, and the departure of Atwater, Voight asks him to join the Intelligence Unit.

== Episodes ==
Season	Episodes	Originally released		Rank	Average viewers (million)
Season	Episodes	First released	Last released	Rank	Average viewers (million)
Pilot		May 15, 2013		—N/a	6.90
1	15	January 8, 2014	May 21, 2014	50	8.03
2	23	September 24, 2014	May 20, 2015	51	8.74
3	23	September 30, 2015	May 25, 2016	47	8.71
4	23	September 21, 2016	May 17, 2017	36	8.48
5	22	September 27, 2017	May 9, 2018	24	10.32
6	22	September 26, 2018	May 22, 2019	18	11.18
7	20	September 25, 2019	April 15, 2020	11	11.23
8	16	November 11, 2020	May 26, 2021	10	9.73
9	22	September 22, 2021	May 25, 2022	13	9.15
10	22	September 21, 2022	May 24, 2023	13	8.27
11	13	January 17, 2024	May 22, 2024	13	7.87
12	22	September 25, 2024	May 21, 2025	16	9.61
13	21	October 1, 2025	May 13, 2026	18	9.10
14	21	October 7, 2026	TBA	TBA	TBA

=== Crossovers ===
- "A Dark Day" (Chicago Fire Season 2, Episode 20) – In the first crossover with Fire, concluding on "8:30 PM", an explosion occurs at Chicago Med, sending the fire and police departments in a race against the clock to find the culprits.
- "Nobody Touches Anything" (Chicago Fire Season 3, Episode 7) / "Chicago Crossover" (Law & Order: Special Victims Unit Season 16, Episode 7) – In the first crossover with Fire and SVU, concluding on "They'll Have to Go Through Me", a routine house fire uncovers evidence of a pedophile ring spanning from Chicago to New York.
- "Three Bells" (Chicago Fire Season 3, Episode 13) – In the second crossover with Fire, concluding on "A Little Devil Complex", Firehouse 51 and Intelligence search for the serial arsonist who killed Leslie Shay.
- "We Called Her Jellybean" (Chicago Fire Season 3, Episode 21) / "Daydream Believer" (Law & Order: Special Victims Unit Season 16, Episode 20) – In the second crossover with P.D. and SVU, continuing on "The Number of Rats", a fire uncovers evidence of a serial arsonist suspected of committing rape and murder in Chicago and New York.
- "The Beating Heart" (Chicago Fire Season 4, Episode 10) / "Malignant" (Chicago Med Season 1, Episode 5) – In the first crossover with Fire and Med, concluding on "Now I'm God", a member of Firehouse 51 is rushed to Chicago Med for a stabbing while an attempted suicide uncovers four cases of chemo overdose, leading to an investigation that becomes personal for Voight.
- "Nationwide Manhunt" (Law & Order: Special Victims Unit Season 17, Episode 14) – In the third crossover with SVU, concluding on "The Song of Gregory William Yates", the New York and Chicago police departments hunt for escaped criminal Greg Yates.
- "Some Make It, Some Don't" (Chicago Fire Season 5, Episode 9) – In the third crossover with Fire, concluding on "Don't Bury This Case", Severide becomes the prime suspect in a case of vehicular manslaughter.
- "Deathtrap" (Chicago Fire Season 5, Episode 15) / "Fake" (Chicago Justice Season 1, Episode 1) – In the only crossover with Fire and Justice, continuing on "Emotional Proximity", the prime suspect in a warehouse fire is put on trial.
- "Hiding Not Seeking" (Chicago Fire Season 6, Episode 13) – In the fourth crossover with Fire, beginning on "Profiles", Firehouse 51 helps Intelligence investigate a series of bombings targeting members of the media.
- "Going to War" (Chicago Fire Season 7, Episode 2) / "When to Let Go" (Chicago Med Season 4, Episode 2) – In the second crossover with Fire and Med, concluding on "Endings", the victims of an apartment complex fire are rushed into Chicago Med and Intelligence races to find the culprit.
- "What I Saw" (Chicago Fire Season 7, Episode 15) – In the fifth crossover with P.D., concluding on "Good Men", Cruz helps Intelligence track down robbers who have been using a firehouse lockbox key.
- "Infection" (Chicago Fire Season 8, Episode 4/Chicago Med Season 5, Episode 4/Chicago P.D. Season 7, Episode 4) – In the third crossover with Fire and Med, a bioterrorist spreads a deadly virus throughout Chicago.
- "Off the Grid" (Chicago Fire Season 8, Episode 15) – In the sixth crossover with Fire, concluding on "Burden of Truth", Sean Roman gets involved in the investigation of opioid overdoses connected to his sister.
- "Emotional Rescue" (FBI Season 2, Episode 19) – Chicago PD Detective Hailey Upton (guest star Tracy Spiridakos) temporarily joins the FBI's New York City's Field Office as a part of their interagency training program and finds her methods clash with the Bureau's by-the-book environment.

== Spin-off ==
At the 2016 Television Critics Association winter press tour, NBC Entertainment president Jennifer Salke revealed that the network had discussions with Dick Wolf about a fourth series in the Chicago franchise centered on the legal system. The working title was Chicago Law. Salke has since confirmed that the series was officially in development. The series was a spin-off of Chicago P.D. by introducing Assistant State's Attorney (ASA) characters in the 21st episode of P.D.'s third season. Philip Winchester was the first to be cast. Nazneen Contractor joined the series in March 2016 and the title was changed to Chicago Justice. Rocky alum Carl Weathers played Cook County State's Attorney Mark Jefferies, while Joelle Carter also starred. Lorraine Toussaint reprised her role as defense attorney Shambala Green, who appeared in seven episodes of Law & Order. On May 12, 2016, NBC gave Chicago Justice a series order. On September 28, it was reported that Jon Seda would join the cast and that his character Antonio would become an investigator for the DA's office. The series ran from March 1, to May 14, 2017. In July 2017, it was announced that Seda would rejoin Chicago P.D. full-time.

== Production ==
On March 27, 2013, it was reported that NBC was considering plans for a spin-off of Chicago Fire. Deadline Hollywood revealed that the proposed spin-off would involve the Chicago Police Department, and would be created and executive produced by Dick Wolf, Derek Haas, Michael Brandt, and Matt Olmstead. On May 10, 2013, NBC picked up the show for the 2013–14 United States network television schedule. On May 12, 2013, the show was announced as an unscheduled midseason replacement. The show premiered on January 8, 2014.

It came to light in November 2017 that Bush had left the show because of Beghe's behavior behind the scenes. Bush's claims led NBC to open an investigation into Beghe's behavior. On November 21, 2017, Deadline reported that Beghe was investigated for behavior that was considered overly aggressive. Beghe released a statement in which he admitted to engaging in aggressive behavior and apologized for it.

The seventh season premiered on September 25, 2019. More recently, Gwen Sigan was promoted to showrunner and signed an overall deal with Universal Television.

On February 27, 2020, NBC renewed the series for an eighth, ninth and tenth season. The eighth season premiered on November 11, 2020. The ninth season premiered on September 22, 2021. The tenth season premiered on September 21, 2022. On May 5, 2025, NBC renewed the series for a thirteenth season. On March 27, 2026, the series was renewed for a fourteenth season.

=== Filming ===
The series is filmed entirely in Chicago. The exterior of the station house is the Old Maxwell Street Police Station (943 West Maxwell Street) and is the same location that was used in the series Hill Street Blues. It is located about half a mile from the firehouse location of Chicago Fire at 1360 S. Blue Island Ave.

On March 13, 2020, Universal Television production of the seventh season was shut down due to the impact of COVID-19 pandemic.

=== Casting ===
Cast members include Jason Beghe as the Intelligence team leader Sergeant Hank Voight and Jon Seda as Detective Antonio Dawson. Actors Tania Raymonde, Kelly Blatz, Scott Eastwood, and Melissa Sagemiller were initially cast as well.

However, as the show went into pre-production, the cast began to change. On June 13, 2013, it was announced that Melissa Sagemiller would no longer be a part of the show and Jesse Lee Soffer officially joined the cast as a series regular. On August 23, 2013, Patrick Flueger and One Tree Hill star Sophia Bush joined the cast as Officer Adam Ruzek and Detective Erin Lindsay, respectively. Marina Squerciati joined the cast on August 28, 2013. On August 30, Elias Koteas became a regular. Archie Kao was announced as a regular on September 27, 2013. On October 21, 2013, Stella Maeve was cast in a recurring role as Nadia, a pretty 18-year-old escort who is addicted to heroin and goes through a very difficult withdrawal. Sydney Tamiia Poitier was announced as a guest star in December 2013. On December 20, 2013, it was announced that both Eastwood and Raymonde had departed the series over creative differences.

In September 2016, it was reported that Seda would move to the legal drama spin-off Chicago Justice as a regular. In May 2017, it was announced that Bush would depart the series after four seasons. After Chicago Justice's cancellation, in July 2017, it was announced that Seda would move back to Chicago P.D. as a series regular for season five. In July 2017, Tracy Spiridakos was promoted to series regular as Det. Hailey Upton after a three-episode guest stint in season four. On April 19, 2019, NBC announced that Seda would leave the series again at the end of the sixth season. In July 2022, Benjamin Levy Aguilar, who portrayed Officer Dante Torres in one episode in season 9, is upgraded to series regular. On August 29, 2022, it was announced that Jesse Lee Soffer would be leaving the drama during season ten. On October 24, 2023, it was reported that Spiridakos would be leaving the drama during season eleven. In July 2024, it was announced that Toya Turner would join as a new series regular. In June 2025, it was reported that Turner would depart the series after one season. In July 2025, it was reported that Arienne Mandi joined the cast as a new series regular for the thirteenth season. In October 2025, it was reported that Flueger would be taking a leave of absence to deal with a personal matter. In July 2026, it was reported that LaRoyce Hawkins would depart the series after thirteen seasons, with him planning to leave in the beginning of the fourteenth season.

== Reception ==
=== Ratings ===
Viewership and ratings per season of Chicago P.D.
Season	Timeslot (ET)	Episodes	First aired		Last aired		TV season	Viewership rank	Avg. viewers (millions)
Season	Timeslot (ET)	Episodes	Date	Viewers (millions)	Date	Viewers (millions)	TV season	Viewership rank	Avg. viewers (millions)
1	Wednesday 10:00 pm	15	January 8, 2014	8.59	May 21, 2014	6.27	2013–14	50	8.03
2	Wednesday 10:00 pm	23	September 24, 2014	8.51	May 20, 2015	7.21	2014–15	51	8.74
3	Wednesday 10:00 pm	23	September 30, 2015	6.65	May 25, 2016	6.88	2015–16	47	8.71
4	Wednesday 10:00 pm	23	September 21, 2016	6.87	May 17, 2017	6.50	2016–17	36	8.48
5	Wednesday 10:00 pm	22	September 27, 2017	6.11	May 9, 2018	6.34	2017–18	24	10.32
6	Wednesday 10:00 pm	22	September 26, 2018	7.14	May 22, 2019	6.59	2018–19	18	11.18
7	Wednesday 10:00 pm	20	September 25, 2019	6.49	April 15, 2020	7.82	2019–20	11	11.23
8	Wednesday 10:00 pm	16	November 11, 2020	6.43	May 26, 2021	6.33	2020–21	10	9.73
9	Wednesday 10:00 pm	22	September 22, 2021	6.54	May 25, 2022	5.98	2021–22	13	9.15
10	Wednesday 10:00 pm	22	September 21, 2022	5.48	May 24, 2023	4.76	2022–23	11	8.27
11	Wednesday 10:00 pm	13	January 17, 2024	5.82	May 22, 2024	4.89	2023–24	13	7.96
12	Wednesday 10:00 pm	22	September 25, 2024	4.31	May 21, 2025	4.75	2024–25	TBD	TBD
13	Wednesday 10:00 pm	21	October 1, 2025	4.39	May 13, 2026	N/A	2025–26	TBD	TBD
14	Wednesday 10:00 pm	21	October 7, 2026	3.98	TBA	TBD	2026–27	TBD	TBD

=== Reviews ===
Chicago P.D. has received mixed reviews from critics. Metacritic, which assigns a normalized rating out of 100 to reviews from mainstream critics, gives the drama a rating of 50 based on 22 reviews, indicating "mixed or average reviews". Rotten Tomatoes gives season 1 a rating of 61% based on reviews from 31 critics, with an average rating of 5.29/10 and a consensus which states "Though it suggests potential for greater success, Chicago P.D. is ultimately an old school cop show, content to mimic Hill Street Blues and other classic procedurals".

Ray Rahman of Entertainment Weekly gave the drama a favorable review: "It's hard to imagine the series capturing the compelling, can't-watch-just-one magic that makes the Law & Order franchise so marathonable, but it moves just fast enough to keep you from changing the channel in search of an SVU re-run." Alessandra Stanley of The New York Times also gave the series a positive review when it premiered on January 8: "Chicago P.D. is, in many ways, a throwback to an earlier, male-dominated era of crime shows, yet it carves out room for strong female characters who are good at their jobs and taken seriously by their colleagues." Robert Bianco of USA Today expressed disappointment: "When did Wolf's work, which used to show some grace and wit, become this ugly, plodding and crass?"

Chicago P.D. has been criticized by some for glorifying police brutality, particularly in the context of the Black Lives Matter Movement.

== Broadcast and streaming ==
- US: Chicago P.D. airs new episodes on NBC. Reruns of the show air on NBC's sister networks USA and Oxygen. On USA, it airs Mondays from 9 am to 8 pm ET before Monday Night Raw, and on Fridays and Saturdays from 9 am to 11 pm ET. On Oxygen, it airs Thursdays from 10 am to 2 am ET. Reruns are aired Tuesday evenings from 8 pm to 9 pm ET on MyNetworkTV and all day Thursday from 11 am to 3 am ET on Ion. Chicago P.D. is also available through electronic sell-through platforms including iTunes, Amazon Prime Video, and Vudu. The series is also available for streaming on Peacock along with Chicago Fire, Chicago Med, Law & Order, Law & Order: Special Victims Unit and Law & Order: Criminal Intent.
- Canada: Chicago P.D. was broadcast on Global for six seasons, then moved to Citytv. Episodes for the sixth season in the Atlantic time zone air three hours ahead of the U.S. eastern/central broadcast due to the time difference.
- UK: Chicago P.D. is broadcast on 5USA in the United Kingdom and Ireland. The first season aired Wednesdays at 9:00 p.m. between July 16 and October 22, 2014. Repeats were later broadcast on parent channel, Channel 5, prior to the broadcast of the second season beginning April 8, 2015, From late 2019, the show now airs on Sky Witness.
- Australia: Chicago P.D. premiered on the Universal Channel on November 20, 2014.
- Southeast Asia: Chicago P.D. premiered on the HITS Now on February 6, 2023.

== Awards and nominations ==
Awards and nominations for Chicago P.D.
Year	Award	Category	Nominee(s)	Result
2014	Imagen Foundation Awards	Best Supporting Actor/Television	Jon Seda	Won
2014	Imagen Foundation Awards	Best Primetime Television Program: Drama or Comedy	Chicago P.D.	Nominated
2015	Imagen Foundation Awards	Best Supporting Actor/Television	Jon Seda	Nominated
2015	Prism Awards	Drama Series Episode – Substance Use	Chicago P.D. – Episode: "Thirty Balloons"	Nominated
2016	Imagen Foundation Awards	Best Actor/Television	Jon Seda	Won
2017	People's Choice Awards	Favorite TV Crime Drama Actress	Sophia Bush	Nominated
