= Overdrive (2017 film) =

2017 film by Antonio Negret

- Theatrical release poster
- Directed by: Antonio Negret
- Written by: Michael Brandt; Derek Haas
- Produced by: Pierre Morel; Grégoire Melin; Christopher Tuffin; Michael Brandt; Derek Haas
- Starring: Scott Eastwood; Freddie Thorp; Ana de Armas; Gaia Weiss; Simon Abkarian; Clemens Schick
- Cinematography: Laurent Barès
- Edited by: Samuel Danési; Sophie Fourdrinoy
- Music by: Pascal Lengagne
- Production companies: Overdrive Productions; Kinology; TF1 Studio; Nexus Factory; Umedia; Sentient Pictures; Brandt/Haas Productions
- Distributed by: Océan Films (France); Belga Films (Belgium); Paramount Pictures (United States)
- Release dates: 15 June 2017 (Slovenia); 9 August 2017 (Belgium); 16 August 2017 (France); 6 October 2017 (United States)
- Running time: 93 minutes
- Countries: France; Belgium; United States
- Languages: English; French
- Budget: €24.3 million
- Box office: $9.6 million

Overdrive is a 2017 action thriller film directed by Antonio Negret and written by Michael Brandt and Derek Haas. An international co-production of France, Belgium and the United States, the film stars Scott Eastwood, Freddie Thorp, Ana de Armas, Gaia Weiss, Simon Abkarian and Clemens Schick. Principal photography began on 4 January 2016 in Paris and Marseille, France.

Andrew and Garret Foster, half-brothers and skilled car thieves, are sent to steal a crime lord's luxury car, and get more than what they bargained for.

The film was first released in theaters on June 15, 2017 and was a box office bomb.

== Plot ==
Half-brothers Andrew and Garret Foster operate as international car thieves, targeting high-end of the market vehicles. They steal a rare Bugatti in transit after it is purchased at auction in France, unaware that the car was bought by Marseille crime boss Jacomo Morier.

Morier's men capture the Fosters when they try to sell the car and take them to his house, where he shows them his garage full of cars. He then means to shoot them but, to escape their punishment, the brothers offer to help Morier complete his collection by stealing a rare 1962 Ferrari 250 GTO (worth $38,000,000) owned by ruthless tycoon and rival, Max Klemp. He agrees but sets the condition that the theft must be carried out within one week.

The brothers hurriedly recruit a team in Marseille to carry out the job, including Andrew's girlfriend Stephanie and her pickpocket friend Devin. Andrew tells Garret that this will be his last job. They also have to cope with Morier's cousin Laurent overseeing their operation, as well as a pair of Interpol agents. Garret, who had recently been conned by a woman who pretended to fall in love with him, begins a relationship with Devin.

For insurance, Morier's men kidnap Stephanie in the Marseille marketplace. Andrew and Garret arrive in their flat and Devin tells them Stephanie has been taken. They head to Morier's house to find Stephanie bound and gagged under a spinning car wheel, which Laurent threatens to lower onto her face. Andrew and Garret promise to finish the job in order to save Stephanie.

When the day of the robbery comes, the brothers put their plan into effect. Stephanie, locked in a room in Morier's house, attempts to seduce Laurent and fails, although she manages to steal his key to the door and escape. She sets off the house alarms and leaves with a rifle to meet Andrew, Garret and their team at the door.

Morier realises that the events that led up to this point have been part of an elaborate diversion to allow them to steal his own car collection. Morier only understands what is happening as the gang are making their escape and he chases them to the docks.

During the pursuit, Andrew proposes to Stephanie and she agrees to marry him. In a final confrontation, Morier is killed when his Maserati Quattroporte is rammed into the water by a large motor coach driven by Devin. Devin leaves, promising to call Garret.

Andrew and Garret give all of Morier's cars to Klemp, revealing that this had been the plan all along, and that they had partnered with him to get back at Morier. In a further plot twist, the two Interpol agents were also partnered with Klemp. But as Devin leaves, she has in her hand the code to the garage where Klemp keeps his prized Ferrari.

Garret, Stephanie and Andrew are later seen together in Paris. Garrett fears he has been stood up again when Devin shows up in Klemp's Ferrari and gives the keys to Andrew. When Andrew then gives the car to Garret, Garret thinks this means Andrew is leaving the business. However, Stephanie mentions that there is a very rare car in Barcelona, one out of only nine in the world, and the three are tempted to steal it. Andrew decides to join them and the re-established team begins to make plans.

== Cast ==
- Scott Eastwood as Andrew Foster, Garrett's older half-brother
- Freddie Thorp as Garret Foster, Andrew's younger half-brother
- Ana de Armas as Stephanie
- Gaia Weiss as Devin
- Clemens Schick as Max Klemp
- Joshua Fitoussi as Leon
- Lester Makedonsky as Rémy
- Philippe Ohrel as Klemp guard
- Anais Pedri as Clair
- Abraham Pelaga as Laurent Morier
- Moussa Maaskri as Panahi
- Manuel Jimenez as Racer #6
- Pierre-Marie Mosconi as Officer Closson
- Frédéric Anscombre as Officer Depaul
- Kaaris as Frank
- Simon Abkarian as Jacomo Morier

== Production ==
On 12 May 2011, it was announced that Pierre Morel would produce the action thriller film Overdrive. Antonio Negret signed on to direct the film based on the script by Michael Brandt and Derek Haas, who would also produce the film. Sentient Pictures would produce the film. On 1 September 2015 Christopher Tuffin was also announced to produce the film. In November 2015, Kinology sold the film's international rights to different buyers. Alex Pettyfer, Matthew Goode, Garrett Hedlund, Jamie Bell, Karl Urban, Ben Barnes, Emilia Clarke and Sam Claflin were all once attached separately at various points during development.

Principal photography on the film began on 4 January 2016 in Paris and Marseille, France.

== Release ==
Overdrive was first released theatrically in Slovenia on 15 June 2017. The film was then released in Belgium on 9 August 2017 by Belga Films and in France on 16 August 2017 by Océan Films. In the United States, it was released in select theaters and on demand and digital on 6 October 2017 by Paramount Pictures.

== Reception ==
On the review aggregator website Rotten Tomatoes, the film holds an approval rating of 29% based on 14 reviews, with an average rating of 4.1/10. The Hollywood Reporter referred to the film as a "formulaic adolescent-male button-pusher, which is witless and brainless but not entirely joyless." Danny Korecki of Supercar Blondie wrote, "The movie is not the best car movie ever, so if you accept that you can enjoy it just for what it is – a good time."
