= Catch That Kid =

2004 film by Bart Freundlich

- Theatrical release poster
- Directed by: Bart Freundlich
- Written by: Michael Brandt; Derek Haas
- Based on: Klatretøsen by: Nikolaj Arcel; Hans Fabian Wullenweber; Erlend Loe
- Produced by: Andrew Lazar; Uwe Schott
- Starring: Kristen Stewart; Corbin Bleu; Max Thieriot; Jennifer Beals; Sam Robards; John Carroll Lynch; James Le Gros
- Cinematography: Julio Macat
- Edited by: Stuart Levy
- Music by: George S. Clinton
- Production companies: Fox 2000 Pictures; Mediastream III; Mad Chance; Nimbus Film
- Distributed by: 20th Century Fox
- Release date: February 6, 2004
- Running time: 92 minutes
- Countries: Germany; Denmark; United States
- Language: English
- Budget: $12 million
- Box office: $17 million

Catch That Kid (also known as Mission Without Permission) is a 2004 family action comedy film directed by Bart Freundlich, written by Michael Brandt and Derek Haas, and starring Kristen Stewart, Corbin Bleu, Max Thieriot, Jennifer Beals, Sam Robards, John Carroll Lynch, and James Le Gros. It is a remake of the Danish film Klatretøsen (2002) and tells the story of three kids who rob a bank to obtain the money to pay for the expensive and experimental surgery needed for the father of one of them when the insurance company and the bank president won't help his wife.

The film's working titles were Mission Without Permission (also the film's British title as well as part of one of the taglines), Catch That Girl, and Catch That Kid! The film received negative reviews.

== Plot ==
Madeline Rose "Maddy" Phillips is a 12-year-old girl who loves to climb, often ascending the nearby water tower. Her father Tom shares her passion, but fell more than 100 feet during a climb years earlier. Tom and his wife Molly are afraid Maddy may suffer a similar accident and have forbidden her from climbing. Latent injuries from Tom's fall have recently paralyzed him from the neck down.

The family hears of an experimental operation which can save him, but insurance will not pay for the operation and the family does not have $250,000 for the treatment. Harderbach Financial's president Donald Brisbane refuses to loan the amount, despite Molly being employed by the bank to design a security system. Maddy comes up with a plan to rob the bank for the money with her knowledge of her mother's system.

Maddy steals three go-karts from her father's racecourse and recruits her two friends Gus and Austin to help her. To convince them, she separately tells each one she loves him and gives him one-half of her friendship necklace. In addition, they also trick family friend/bank employee Al Hartman to pre-record a certain scene.

They break into Harderbach Financial on the night of a party Brisbane is throwing, bringing along Max, Maddy's infant brother, whom she is supposed to be babysitting. Maddy distracts the security guards Ferrell and Gus' older brother Chad. Maddy and Gus progress to a room with thousands of security deposit boxes while Austin watches Max and manipulates the cameras and alarms to keep the guards away from them. After a sudden equipment failure with her climbing gear, Maddy is forced to free-climb the rest of the way up to the main vault containing hundreds of thousands of dollars. Upon reaching the vault door, she accidentally triggers a timer, then with seconds left, cracks the code ("Madeline"), grabs $250,000 from the vault, and flees the room, unintentionally setting off the alarm after forgetting to type the exit code. The trio manages to escape the bank's Rottweilers and re-escapes Chad who tasers Ferrell, but then lets them go before accidentally tasering himself.

Molly arrives at the bank and Brisbane accuses her system of being useless and fires Hartmann. Brisbane's guest Francois Nuffaut apologizes to Molly and redirects the blame onto Brisbane for throwing a party at the bank before the security system was operable.

Gus and Austin find out that Maddy played them after seeing each other's necklaces and leave her, but the trio reunites during a police chase and evades them successfully.

Maddy and her friends go to the hospital with the money to pay for the surgery, but Molly realizes who the thieves are due to different clues and also arrives at the hospital. Molly realizes her daughter was only doing what she thought was right for her father and does a cover-up by telling the police that the robbery was an unplanned test she performed. As they leave, reporters outside the hospital give the public the full story.

The next morning, Molly forgives Maddy for her actions. The public and the news studios sympathize with the Phillips family and donate money for Tom's surgery. Hartmann has been promoted to bank president and gives them the loan with Brisbane no longer working there.

Three months later, Tom has recovered from the surgery. Maddy, Gus, and Austin continue to argue playfully about who will be a better boyfriend for Maddy.

== Cast ==
- Kristen Stewart as Madeline "Maddy" Rose Phillips, a young girl who is an expert climber.
- Corbin Bleu as Austin, a friend of Maddy who is an expert hacker.
- Max Thieriot as Gus, a friend of Maddy who is a mechanical expert.
- Jennifer Beals as Molly Phillips, the mother of Maddy who works as a security consultant at Harderbach Financial.
- Sam Robards as Tom Phillips, the proprietor of a go-kart business whose internal injuries from an earlier climbing activity have left him paralyzed enough to motivate Maddy's bank-robbing plot.
- John Carroll Lynch as Al Hartmann, a family friend of the Phillips family and worker at Harderbach Financial.
- James Le Gros as Ferrell, a security guard at Harderbach Financial.
- Michael Des Barres as Donald Brisbane, the bank president of Harderbach Financial.
- Stark Sands as Chad, Gus' older brother who works as a security guard trainee at Harderbach Financial under Ferrell.
- Grant Hayden Scott and Shane Avery Scott as Maxwell "Max" Phillips, the baby brother of Maddy.
- François Gideroy as Francois Nuffaut, a guest at Brisbane's banquet at Harderbach Financial.
- Christine Estabrook as Sharon
- Kevin G. Schmidt as Skip, a boy who Maddy, Austin, and Gus know.
- Meagen Fay as Doctor
- Audrey Wasilewski as Nurse

== Production ==
Mara Wilson revealed she auditioned for the role of Maddy Phillips, despite knowing she was too old for the role, in a 2016 article written by the actress for The Guardian.

== Reception ==
=== Box office ===
Catch That Kid opened at #6 in the weekend of February 6, 2004, raking in $5.8 million in its first opening weekend. The film spent two weeks at the U.S. box office top ten. The film made $16.7 million in the United States and $226,963 in other countries for a worldwide total of $16.9 million, against a budget of $12 million.

=== Critical response ===
On Rotten Tomatoes, the film received an approval rating of 13% based on 86 reviews and an average score of 3.82/10. The site's critical consensus reads: "An unimaginative heist movie aimed strictly at the preteen set." On Metacritic, the film holds a score of 33 out of 100, based on 27 critics, indicating "generally unfavorable" reviews. Audiences polled by CinemaScore gave the film an average grade of "A−" on an A+ to F scale.

Critics overall expressed dislike towards the film's questionable morals and lack of originality, comparing it unfavorably to the Spy Kids trilogy. Despite these negative reviews, Roger Ebert of Ebert & Roeper and the Chicago Sun Times gave Catch That Kid "thumbs up", stating that it lacks the flash of Spy Kids and is more fun than Agent Cody Banks.

== Novelization ==
A novelization of the story was released in conjunction with the film. The novel was written by Suzanne Weyn, Michael Brandt, and Derek Haas.

== See also ==
- List of American films of 2004
