= Filthy Rich (2020 TV series) =

American prime time soap opera

- Genre: Comedy drama; Soap opera
- Based on: Filthy Rich by: Gavin Strawhan; Rachel Lang
- Developed by: Tate Taylor
- Starring: Kim Cattrall; Melia Kreiling; Steve Harris; Aubrey Dollar; Corey Cott; Benjamin Levy Aguilar; Mark L. Young; Olivia Macklin; Aaron Lazar; Gerald McRaney; Cranston Johnson
- Narrated by: Olivia Macklin
- Music by: Jeff Toyne
- Country of origin: United States
- Original language: English
- No. of seasons: 1
- No. of episodes: 10

Production
- Executive producers: Brian Grazer; Francie Calfo; Tate Taylor; John Norris; Abe Sylvia
- Producers: Kim Cattrall; Jason Roberts; Sheri Holman
- Cinematography: Christina Voros
- Editors: James D. Wilcox; Amanda Pollack; Sheri Bylander; Edward Chin
- Camera setup: Single-camera
- Running time: 41–44 minutes
- Production companies: Wyolah Entertainment; Imagine Television Studios; Fox Entertainment; 20th Century Fox Television

Original release
- Network: Fox
- Release: September 21 – November 30, 2020

Filthy Rich is an American comedy drama television series created by Tate Taylor for the Fox Broadcasting Company. It is based on the New Zealand series of the same name. The series was originally supposed to premiere as a spring entry during the 2019–20 television season, but ended up being pushed to fall 2020 upon the outbreak of the COVID-19 pandemic. In October 2020, the series was canceled five episodes into its freshman run. The series concluded the following month.

== Premise ==
Described as a "Gothic family drama in which wealth, power and religion collide—with outrageously soapy results", the series centers on a mega-rich Southern family who made their money through a Christian television network based in Louisiana. The sudden passing of the network's founder in a plane crash brings out three more family members (his other children from other relationships outside his marriage who were written into his will), all of whom want to inherit the empire for their own reasons.

== Cast and characters ==
=== Main ===
- Kim Cattrall as Margaret Monreaux, a TV host and co-founder of the Sunshine Network, who is determined to control the business by any means necessary when her co-founder husband unexpectedly dies
- Melia Kreiling as Ginger Sweets, the vengeful daughter of a Las Vegas cocktail waitress and one of Eugene's children outside of his marriage, who runs a cam-girl website; she stands in the way of Margaret's plans to get her, Antonio, and Jason out of the business
- Steve Harris as Franklin Lee, a lawyer and legal advisor to the Monreaux family who helped them build the Sunshine Network; he assists Margaret as she deals with the fallout of Eugene's death
- Aubrey Dollar as Rose Monreaux, a fashion designer trying to distance herself from her mother, who she feels doesn't support her ambitions
- Corey Cott as Eric Monreaux, the VP of the Sunshine Network and aspiring heir apparent to his father's business
- Benjamin Levy Aguilar as Antonio Rivera, a single dad and MMA fighter, and one of Eugene's children of his marriage.
- Mark L. Young as Jason Conley / Mark, a Colorado marijuana grower who is also one of Eugene's children outside of his marriage, and has a different agenda that he's keeping to himself; he later reveals to Rose that he's really Mark, the adoptive brother of the real Jason who is in a coma, and is assuming Jason's identity for the money
- Olivia Macklin as Becky Monreaux, Eric's snooty wife and sister of Reverend Thomas; she is pregnant at the start of the series
- Aaron Lazar as Reverend Paul Luke Thomas, a beloved, popular, influential and very ambitious televangelist who is considered the most popular personality on the Sunshine Network other than Margaret; he seeks to sow discord between Margaret and her family so he can usurp control of the business
- Gerald McRaney as Eugene Monreaux, Margaret's minister husband and a conservative icon who founded the Sunshine Network, and whose apparent death revealed his secret life; however, Eugene is revealed at the end of the first episode to still be alive

=== Recurring ===
- Deneen Tyler as Norah Ellington, Margaret's friend and loyal director of the Sunshine Network
- Aqueela Zoll as Rachel, Ginger's best friend and co-worker in her online porn business
- Rachel York as Tina Sweet, Ginger's fragile mother who had an affair with Eugene years ago
- Cranston Johnson as Luke Taylor, an investigative journalist trying to uncover the Monreaux family secrets
- Annie Golden as Ellie, a pious woman who rescues Eugene from the plane crash wreckage in the swamp, and as Margaret's mother in flashbacks
- Alanna Ubach as Yopi Candalaria, Antonio's ambitious mother who is using her son for her own ends
- Kenny Alfonso as Don Bouchard, a MMA promoter, who is one of three Sunshine Network investors and a member of the 18:20 working with Reverend Thomas to wrest control from Margaret
- Carl Palmer as Townes Dockerty, one of three Sunshine Network investors and a member of the 18:20 working with Reverend Thomas to wrest control from Margaret
- Thomas Francis Murphy as Hagamond Sheen, a scripture-spouting thug and enforcer who works for the 18:20
- Gia Carides as Veronica, the promiscuous wife of Townes Dockerty, who is secretly the mother of the real Jason Conley

=== Guest ===
- Juliette Lewis as Juliette, a store manager who hires Eugene (in "Psalm 25:3", "Romans 8:30"), and Eugene's mother (in "1 Corinthians 3:13")
- John McConnell as Virgil Love, the Governor of Louisiana, a member of the 18:20 and one of three Sunshine Network investors who is working with Reverend Thomas to wrest control from Margaret (in "Psalm 25:3", "Romans 8:30", and "Proverbs 20:6")
- Tina Lifford as Monique, Franklin's mother (in "Romans 8:30", "Romans 12:21", and "1 Corinthians 3:13")

== Episodes ==
No.	Title	Directed by	Written by	Original release date	Prod. code	U.S viewers (millions)
1	"Pilot"	Tate Taylor	Teleplay by : Tate Taylor	September 21, 2020	1BWJ01	3.03
The death of Eugene Monreaux, founder and president of the televangelist Sunshine Network, in a plane crash reveals his secret will, which instructs an equal share of the company to be awarded to not just his son Eric and daughter Rose, but also three children he fathered outside of his marriage. Margaret Monreaux, his widow, has her lawyer Franklin Lee contact the three children: marijuana farmer Jason Conley, boxer Antonio Rivera, and adult video producer Ginger Sweet, with an offer: $1 million each in exchange for their promised shares in the company. Jason and Antonio accept the deal, but Ginger digs in her heels and demands more. Margaret also decides to appoint herself president of the Sunshine Network instead of Eric, driving a wedge between them. Franklin gives Ginger a letter supposedly written by Eugene confessing how much he loved her, but she realizes it's a fake and calls Luke Taylor, a reporter who gave her his card earlier, to break the story of Eugene's infidelity. However, Margaret, having been warned by Antonio, preempts her by publicly welcoming Eugene's children into the Monreaux family. Eugene wakes up to discover that he survived the crash.
2	"John 3:3"	Tate Taylor	Abe Sylvia	September 28, 2020 (Note: "John 3:3" was released on September 22, 2020, on fox.com and Hulu.)	1BWJ02	2.14
Margaret changes her agreement with Ginger and Antonio; they will both receive $10,000 in allowance per week. Antonio is hired as a member of Margaret's security detail, but Ginger uses the money to bring her studio to New Orleans. Franklin meets with Luke, who warns him that Eugene's "accident" might have been planned. Margaret's public admission of her husband's infidelity damages the recruitment drive for the Sunshine Network's new online retail operation. In desperation, she turns to Reverend Thomas, who asks her to let him baptize Ginger on his show and put Eric in charge of the network's "Sunny Missions". Rose is sent to Colorado to find "Jason", who turns out to be his brother Mark; furthermore, their mother admits that Eugene fathered neither of her sons. Rose forgives Mark and invites him to continue living with her family as Jason when he explains that he only did what he did to pay his brother's hospital bills. Ginger sabotages her baptism by turning it into a promotion for her studio. Eugene is rescued by a swamp hermit who sends him on a journey to redeem his sins before he can return to his family.
3	"Psalm 25:3"	Jann Turner	Blair Singer	October 5, 2020 (Note: "Psalm 25:3" was released on September 22, 2020, on fox.com and Hulu.)	1BWJ03	1.63
4	"Romans 8:30"	Tate Taylor	Sheri Holman	October 19, 2020	1BWJ04	1.71
5	"Proverbs 20:6"	Howie Deutch	Gerald Cuesta & C.A. Johnson	October 26, 2020	1BWJ05	1.39
6	"Hebrews 9:15"	Tate Taylor	Rhett Rossi & Nina Stiefel	November 2, 2020	1BWJ06	1.10
7	"2 Corinthians 3:17"	Howie Deutch	Bryan Goluboff	November 9, 2020	1BWJ07	1.19
8	"James 4:1"	Christina Voros	Sheri Holman	November 16, 2020	1BWJ08	1.16
9	"Romans 12:21"	Billie Woodruff	Gerald Cuesta & Blair Singer	November 23, 2020	1BWJ09	1.20
10	"1 Corinthians 3:13"	Tate Taylor	Teleplay by : Sheri Holman & Bryan Goluboff; Story by : Sheri Holman	November 30, 2020	1BWJ10	1.27
Margaret announces the impending launch of Sunshine Club, while onscreen graphics show over 30 million members. She gives Antonio and Mark seats on the board, but shuns Ginger who refused shares in the business and instead took a cash buyout to invest in Rose's clothing business. Rose plans to marry Mark, but doesn't go through with it after Margaret reveals another stunning secret from Mark's past. A conflicted Eric confesses to police that he watched Luke Taylor die, but Luke soon enters the room, very much alive. He confesses that he is an FBI agent, not a reporter, and tells Eric the 18:20 is much larger than the three known Sunshine Network investors. In exchange for his freedom, he wants Eric to wear a wire around his family. Franklin's backstory is further revealed, showing that Eugene's mother agreed to always take care of him following his assault at the hands of Eugene and his friends. In the present, Franklin tells Norah that he has a substantial net worth and plans to retire, mainly to distance himself from the Monreaux family. Eugene reveals himself to more family members, ultimately showing up at the Monreaux encampment home in view of Margaret and others. He drops one more stunner, stating he has a sixth child: Becky's infant daughter. Proclaiming he's given his shares to Ginger and renounced all his worldly possessions, he asks only for the house so he'll have a place to raise his newborn child. After Eugene departs, Franklin helps Margaret burn down the house.

== Production ==
=== Development ===
On December 19, 2018, it was announced that Fox had given a pilot order to an adaptation of Filthy Rich pitched by Tate Taylor, who also served as executive producer. Production companies involved with the pilot included Imagine Television Studios, Wyolah Films, Fox Entertainment, and the Disney-owned 20th Century Fox Television. On May 9, 2019, it was announced that the production had been given a series order. Originally intended to air in the fall of 2019, the series was pushed back to Spring due to scheduling conflicts involving Taylor. The outbreak of the COVID-19 pandemic resulted in the series premiere being further pushed to fall 2020, in order to shore-up the network's schedule. On October 30, 2020, Fox cancelled the series after one season. The remaining episodes continued to air at their regular timeslot, before concluding on November 30, 2020.

=== Casting ===
In February 2019, it was announced that Kim Cattrall had been cast in the lead role for the pilot, then others including Aubrey Dollar, Benjamin Levy Aguilar, Corey Cott and Mark L. Young had joined the pilot. It was then announced in March 2019 that Gerald McRaney had joined the cast. Alongside the pilot's order announcement, in March 2019 it was reported that Steve Harris, Melia Kreiling, David Denman and Olivia Macklin had joined the cast. On May 11, 2019, it was reported that Denman, who was originally cast to play the male lead opposite Cattrall in the series, had exited and his role would be recast. On September 13, 2019, Aaron Lazar was cast as Reverend Paul Luke Thomas, replacing both Denman and Steven Pasquale.

Similarity to previous show

A 1982 sitcom, Filthy Rich created by Linda Bloodworth-Thomason, had a similar plot line in which the family of a deceased wealthy land baron would not see a dime of his inheritance unless they accepted his son other and family into their own.

== Release ==
On May 13, 2019, Fox released the first official trailer for the series, where it premiered on September 21, 2020.

In Canada, the series premiered on CTV on September 21, 2020. In India, the series premiered on Disney+ Hotstar on September 22, 2020.

In selected international territories, the series premiered on Disney+ under the dedicated streaming hub Star as an original series, starting March 12, 2021.

== Reception ==
=== Critical response ===
For the series, review aggregator Rotten Tomatoes reported a critic approval rating of 64% based on 14 reviews, with an average rating of 6.55/10. The website's critics consensus reads, "Kim Cattrall shines, but Filthy Rich is neither filthy nor rich enough to fulfill its soapy aspirations." Metacritic gave the series a weighted average score of 54 out of 100 based on 14 reviews, indicating "mixed or average reviews".

=== Ratings ===
Viewership and ratings per episode of Filthy Rich
No.	Title	Air date	Rating (18–49)	Viewers (millions)	DVR (18–49)	DVR viewers (millions)	Total (18–49)	Total viewers (millions)
1	"Pilot"	September 21, 2020	0.5	3.03	0.2	1.40	0.7	4.43
2	"John 3:3"	September 28, 2020	0.3	2.14	0.2	1.07	0.5	3.21
3	"Psalm 25:3"	October 5, 2020	0.3	1.63	—N/a	—N/a	—N/a	—N/a
4	"Romans 8:30"	October 19, 2020	0.4	1.71	0.3	1.12	0.7	2.83
5	"Proverbs 20:6"	October 26, 2020	0.3	1.39	0.2	0.97	0.5	2.36
6	"Hebrews 9:15"	November 2, 2020	0.3	1.10	0.2	1.04	0.5	2.14
7	"2 Corinthians 3:17"	November 9, 2020	0.3	1.19	0.1	0.88	0.4	2.05
8	"James 4:1"	November 16, 2020	0.2	1.16	0.2	0.72	0.4	1.92
9	"Romans 12:21"	November 23, 2020	0.3	1.20	—N/a	—N/a	—N/a	—N/a
10	"1 Corinthians 3:13"	November 30, 2020	0.3	1.27	0.2	0.83	0.5	2.10
