= The Double (2011 film) =

2011 film by Michael Brandt

- Theatrical release poster
- Directed by: Michael Brandt
- Written by: Derek Haas; Michael Brandt
- Produced by: Ashok Amritraj; Derek Haas
- Starring: Richard Gere; Topher Grace; Stephen Moyer; Odette Yustman; Stana Katic; Chris Marquette; Tamer Hassan; Martin Sheen
- Cinematography: Jeffrey L. Kimball
- Edited by: Steve Mirkovich
- Music by: John Debney
- Production companies: Hyde Park Entertainment; Imagenation Abu Dhabi
- Distributed by: Image Entertainment
- Release date: October 28, 2011
- Running time: 98 minutes
- Country: United States
- Language: English
- Budget: $13 million
- Box office: $4.7 million

The Double is a 2011 American spy film directed by Michael Brandt, written by Brandt and Derek Haas, and starring Richard Gere, Topher Grace, Stephen Moyer and Martin Sheen. The film tells the story about a retired CIA operative working with a rookie FBI agent to solve the murder of a US senator caused by a Soviet assassin. It was released on October 28, 2011. The film garnered negative reviews from critics, and was a box office bomb.

== Plot ==
Two FBI agents are conducting surveillance at a warehouse. As U.S. Senator Dennis Darden walks out of the door, he is approached by an assassin from behind who slits his throat and escapes. The agents rush to the scene to find the man dead. However, they could not identify the assassin as he committed the murder in darkness. Later, CIA officers arrive on the scene and take charge.

Retired operative Paul Shepherdson is summoned by CIA director Tom Highland to look into the murder. He is introduced to a young FBI agent, Ben Geary who is an expert on a former Soviet operative known as Cassius. Geary reasons that Cassius is the assassin due to his signature garrotting method.

Paul and Ben visit Brutus, one of Cassius's proteges, who is locked up in prison, to learn the whereabouts of Cassius. They provide him with a radio and leave. The prisoner then swallows the batteries from the radio and fakes a poisoning/upset stomach. Upon arriving at a hospital, he regurgitates and spits out the batteries, overpowers the medical staff, and escapes. In the basement's garage, he is attacked by Paul, who reveals himself to be Cassius, the very operative who had previously trained the fugitive. Cassius slits his throat. He then moves to eliminate Ben too, only stopping when interrupted by Ben's wife—Cassius is unable to murder Geary in front of his family. Upon investigating the crime scene, Ben grows increasingly suspicious of Paul. Meanwhile, a Russian terrorist and murderer, Bozlovski, has entered the U.S.

As the investigation deepens, Paul warns Ben to pull out, due to the possibility of harm not only to himself but his family. Ben, who has become obsessed with the idea that Paul is Cassius, starts his own parallel investigation. Meanwhile, Paul tries to contact Bozlovski in a factory where he escapes after an intense firefight. Ben examines another throat-slitting murder of Bozlovski's associate at the same site and is now convinced Paul is indeed Cassius.

Ben pieces together the events of Paul's life and determines that not only is Paul actually Cassius, but also that he is systematically murdering the people involved in the death of his wife and child, who were assassinated by Bozlovski.

Paul has now tracked down Bozlovski to a shipyard warehouse. A while later, Ben also arrives at the building. After being confronted with the evidence, Paul confesses everything. Paul then confronts Ben with the fact that Ben is a Russian spy, which Paul learned at one of Ben's informant drop-offs. He is able to convince Ben that Bozlovski is the actual threat. When Ben reveals that he has plans to return to Russia after this is over, Paul tries to convince him to stay in the FBI and with the family he has grown to love.

Together they hunt down Bozlovski inside the shipyard's warehouse. Bozlovski attacks Paul and Ben, and in the ensuing struggle, a mortally wounded Paul slits Bozlovski's throat using his garrote-watch. However, Paul himself later succumbs to his own injuries. As the only witness, FBI agent Ben relays the incident to his superiors and claims that Bozlovski was Cassius, thereby securing Paul's reputation and recognizing his heroism. As Ben departs, the CIA director Highland asks him whether he would ever consider working at the CIA.

The film ends with Ben returning to his home. Whether he has silently defected to the American government or just became an even deeper Russian asset is left to the audience.

== Cast ==
- Richard Gere as Paul Shepherdson
- Topher Grace as Ben Geary
- Martin Sheen as Tom Highland
- Tamer Hassan as Bozlovski
- Stephen Moyer as Brutus
- Chris Marquette as Oliver
- Odette Yustman as Natalie Geary
- Stana Katic as Amber
- Jeffrey Pierce as Agent Pierce
- Nicole Forester as Molly
- Ed Kelly as Senator Dennis Darden
- Lawrence Gilliard Jr. as Agent Burton
- Randy Flagler as Martin Miller
- Yuri Sardarov as Leo
- Hugh Maguire as Senator Friedman

== Production ==
In April 2010, it was reported that Richard Gere and Topher Grace would star in The Double, an espionage themed thriller film written by Derek Haas and Michael Brandt with the latter set to make his directorial debut with the film. Brandt described The Conversation, Three Days of the Condor, and No Way Out as influences on the film and hoped he could create something of that level.

Haas and Brandt wrote the script for The Double back in 2004.

In June of that year, filming took place in Detroit.

In May 2011, it was reported that Image Entertainment had acquired the distribution rights to The Double.

== Reception ==
The Double received mostly negative reviews from critics. The film holds a 21% approval rating on Rotten Tomatoes, based on 52 reviews, with an average score of 4/10. The website's critics consensus reads, "Riddled with hollow characters and ludicrous plotting, The Double just isn't worth the trouble." Stephanie Merry of The Washington Post gave note of Brandt's scripting of the story, saying that "questionable motives and unbelievable decisions are relatively small potatoes compared with the Sputnik-size plotholes." She also gave credit to his style of direction for having "sweeping shots of the nation's capital, along with some claustrophobic shots that add anxiety to early scenes" but said that "It's not enough to boost up this botched attempt to tinker with something that, while predictable, is at least dependable." Randy Cordova of The Arizona Republic criticized Brandt's direction and screenwriting for lacking any "menace or mystery to the proceedings" and its two main leads' characters for having no chemistry and feeling by-the numbers, saying that, "With its convoluted plot and fading stars, The Double feels like a straight-to-DVD feature that somehow sneaked onto the big screen. It's simply not very good." In a review for the A.V. Club, Noel Murray gave the film a "C−". He felt that Brandt and Haas waste their premise by setting it up like "a typical episode of any basic-cable action series" saying that "while it holds a few surprises, the twists feel writerly, not organic." Roger Ebert highlighted Gere's "subtle catlike body language" in his performance that displays his well-worn screen presence but was critical of Brandt and Haas's script containing thriller clichés and "familiar action-movie tropes" compared to their previous effort 3:10 to Yuma, concluding that it "doesn't approach it in terms of quality. None of it is particularly compelling. Most of the time we're waiting for the other shoe to drop. When, very late in the film, the screenplay comes up with a third shoe, that's going too far." Paste writer Annlee Ellingson gave the film praise for being "a throwback genre flick, complete with a throwback lead that gives away its double cross early yet maintains enough mystery to keep viewers moderately intrigued."
