= Derek Haas =

American writer and producer (born 1970)

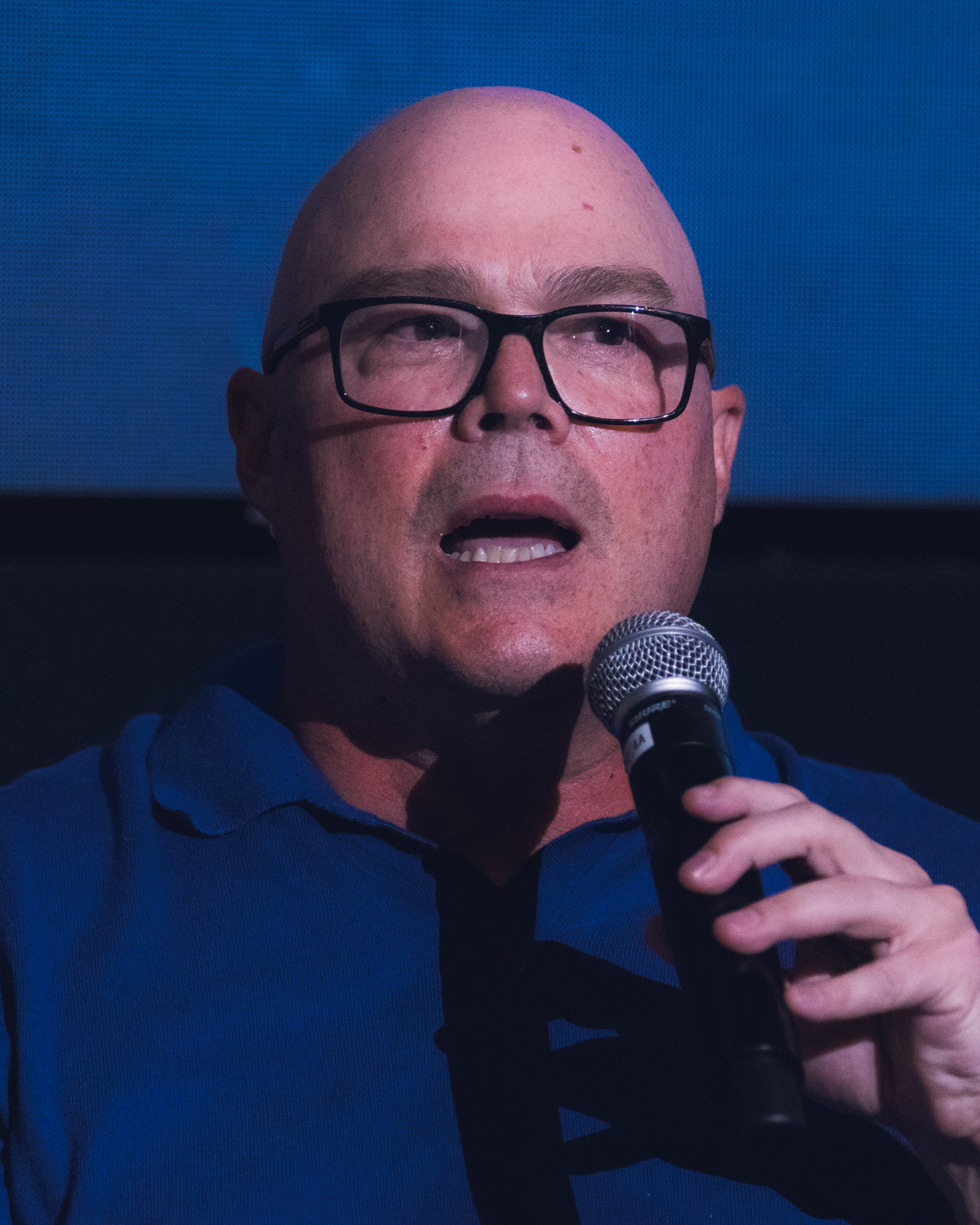
- Haas in 2025
- Born: June 30, 1970 (age 56); Dallas, Texas, U.S
- Occupations: Writer, producer
- Years active: 2001–present

Derek Haas (born June 30, 1970) is an American writer and producer.

== Life and career ==
Derek Haas attended Baylor University in Waco, Texas, where he earned both his B.A. and M.A. in English Literature. He lives in Los Angeles, and has made a name as a screenwriter and co-author of several successful Hollywood films. In 2008 he published his novel The Silver Bear about the young contract killer Columbus. The sequel Columbus was released in 2009, and in 2011, Dark Men was published to complete the Silver Bear trilogy. His fourth novel, The Right Hand, was released in 2012. Haas was the editor of popcornfiction.com, where he published short stories by different authors. One of his own works, "Shake," was sold to Bruckheimer Films. Popcornfiction.com stopped publishing new stories in 2013 after Haas became too busy with television. Haas created and executive produces the NBC drama Chicago Fire, along with his writing partner Michael Brandt. His brother, Clay, has appeared in five episodes. Brandt and Haas also developed and executive produced Chicago P.D., a spin-off of Chicago Fire. Chicago Med, the second spin off of Chicago Fire premiered in November 2015.

== Filmography ==
Films

Year	Title	Writer	Producer
2003	2 Fast 2 Furious	Yes	No
2004	Catch That Kid	Yes	No
2007	3:10 to Yuma	Yes	No
2008	Wanted	Yes	No
2011	The Double	Yes	Yes
2017	Overdrive	Yes	Yes

Television

Year	Title	Writer	Executive producer	Creator	Notes
2001	Invincible	Yes	No	No	TV movie
2012–present	Chicago Fire	Yes	Yes	Yes	Wrote 226 episodes
2014–present	Chicago P.D.	Yes	Yes	Yes	Wrote 195 episodes
2015–present	Chicago Med	Yes	Yes	Developer	Wrote 150 episodes
2017	Chicago Justice	Yes	Yes	Developer	Wrote 13 episodes
2021–25	FBI: International	Yes	Yes	Yes	Wrote 30 episodes
2025	Countdown	Yes	Yes	Yes	Wrote 13 episodes

== Literature ==
=== Novels ===
Silver Bear series

1. 2008 The Silver Bear
2. 2009 Columbus, published as The Hunt for the Bear in the UK
3. 2011 Dark Men
4. 2015 A Different Lie
5. 2018 The Way I Die

Others

- 2012 The Right Hand

=== Short stories ===
- 2009 “Shake” - Popcorn Fiction
- 2011 “Western Law” - Popcorn Fiction
- 2012 “A Bad Feeling” - Popcorn Fiction
- 2013 “Claustrophobia” - Popcorn Fiction
- 2013 “Lie” - Kwik Krimes
- 2015 “West 31st and South Halsted” - Don't Take Pictures
- 2020 “Benchley” - In League with Sherlock Holmes
- 2022 “Snitches Get Stitches” - Ellery Queen Mystery Magazine
