= Michael Brandt =

American screenwriter

- Born: October 1, 1968 (age 58)
- Occupation: Screenwriter
- Notable work: Wanted

Michael Brandt (born October 1, 1968) is an American screenwriter.

== Life and career ==
Brandt is an alumnus of Baylor University in Waco, Texas, where as an undergrad he earned a BBA and in graduate school earned Master of Arts in Communication Studies, with a concentration in Film. His Master's Thesis focused on digital nonlinear editing and the effects of the tool on the final film product. While studying at Baylor, Brandt met frequent collaborator Derek Haas. In the late 1990s, Brandt and Haas began collaborating on screenplays long distance, while Haas lived and worked in Atlanta.

They optioned their first spec script, The Courier, in 1999 while Brandt was working as an assistant editor for Robert Rodriguez on the set of The Faculty in Austin, Texas. In the director's commentary on the Spy Kids 2 DVD, Rodriguez shared that he was impressed that Brandt never revealed he had written a script that had Hollywood interest during his time on set, not wanting to muddy the waters of his working relationship with Rodriguez.

Brandt and Haas's first production, 2003's 2 Fast 2 Furious with Universal, amassed over $236 million worldwide and launched their career. The duo went on to write the remake of the Elmore Leonard short story 3:10 to Yuma, starring Russell Crowe and Christian Bale and directed by James Mangold. Yuma opened at #1 at the box office in September 2007 and received wide critical acclaim. In 2009, the Brandt and Haas adaptation of Wanted starring James McAvoy, Morgan Freeman and Angelina Jolie grossed more than $404 million worldwide.

In 2011, Brandt made his directorial debut with his and Haas's original screenplay The Double, starring Richard Gere, Topher Grace and Martin Sheen. Most recently, Brandt and Haas were the executive producers of the NBC drama Chicago Fire, along with Dick Wolf. He also wrote the script for and produced the film Overdrive. He has three children, Sadie, Ruby, and Decker.

== Filmography ==
Film

Year	Title	Director	Writer	Executive producer
2003	2 Fast 2 Furious	No	Yes	No
2004	Catch That Kid	No	Yes	No
2007	3:10 to Yuma	No	Yes	No
2008	Wanted	No	Yes	No
2011	The Double	Yes	Yes	No
2017	Overdrive	No	Yes	Yes
2024	Arthur the King	No	Yes	Yes

Television

Year	Title	Director	Writer	Executive producer	Creator	Notes
2001	Invincible	No	Yes	No	No	TV movie
2012–present	Chicago Fire	Yes	Yes	Yes	Yes	Directed 5 episodes; Wrote 226 episodes
2014–present	Chicago P.D.	No	Yes	Yes	Developer	Wrote 195 episodes
2015–present	Chicago Med	No	Yes	Yes	Developer	Wrote 150 episodes
