= Project Chanology =

Protest movement against the practices of the Church of Scientology

- Part of Scientology and the Internet and Anonymous on the internet
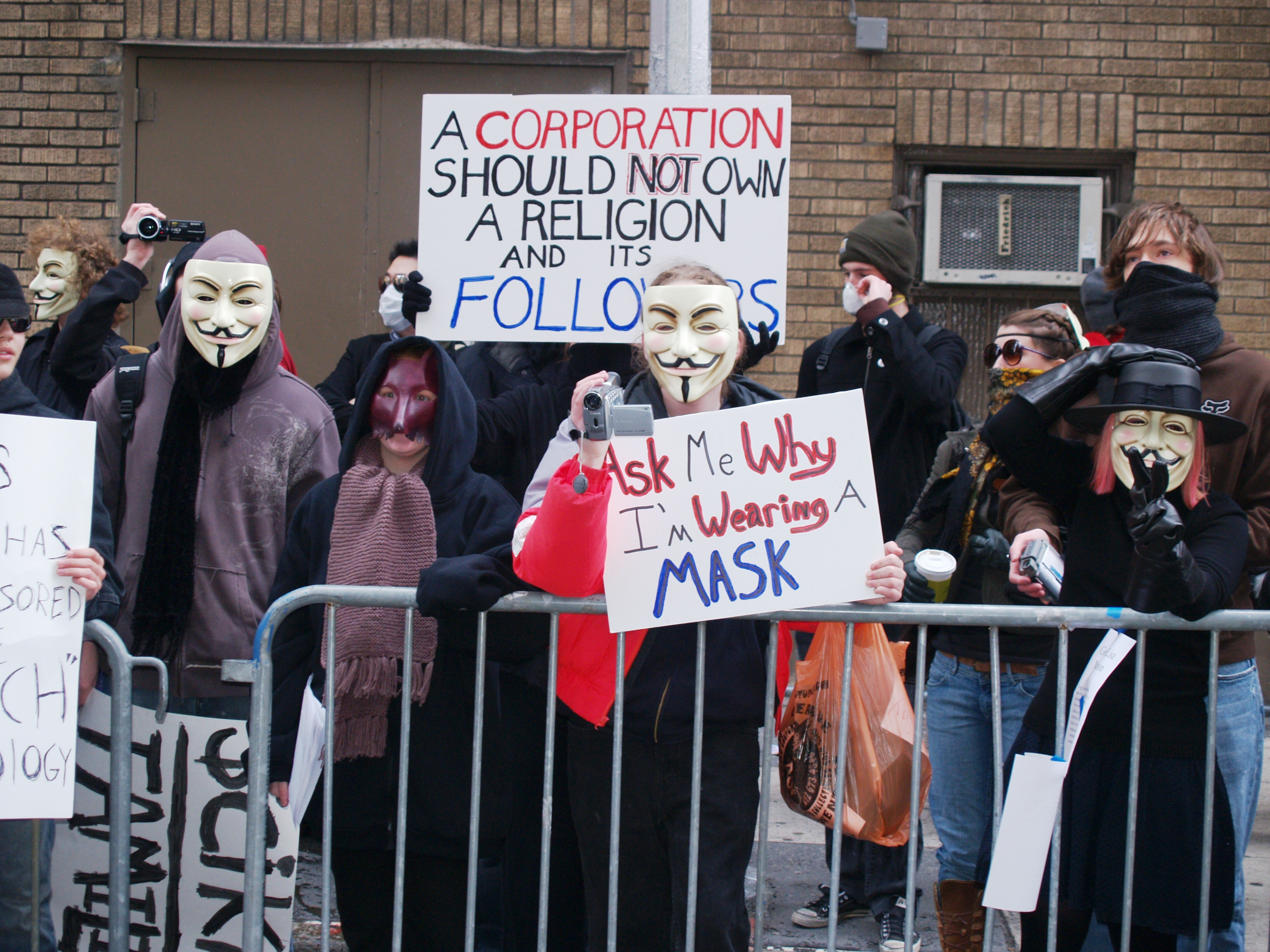
- Protesters in Guy Fawkes masks outside a Scientology center at the February 10, 2008, Project Chanology protest
- Date: January 16, 2008 - c. 2010
- Methods: Internet vigilantism, real world protests

Parties
Anonymous: 4chan; 711chan; Other activists and hackers	Church of Scientology

Lead figures
Non-centralized leadership	David Miscavige

Number
- around 6,000 to 8,300 real life protestors at peak

Project Chanology (also called Operation Chanology) was a protest movement against the practices of the Church of Scientology by members of Anonymous, a leaderless Internet-based group. "Chanology" is a portmanteau of "4chan" (the site where the project originated) and "Scientology". The project was started in response to the Church of Scientology's attempts to remove material from a highly publicized interview with Scientologist Tom Cruise from the Internet in January 2008.

The project was publicly launched in the form of a video posted to YouTube, "Message to Scientology", on January 21, 2008. The video states that Anonymous views Scientology's actions as Internet censorship, and asserts the group's intent to "expel the church from the Internet". This was followed by distributed denial-of-service attacks (DDoS), and soon after, black faxes, prank calls, and other measures intended to disrupt the Church of Scientology's operations. In February 2008, the focus of the protest shifted to legal methods, including nonviolent protests and an attempt to get the Internal Revenue Service to investigate the Church of Scientology's tax-exempt status in the United States.

Reactions from the Church of Scientology regarding the protesters' actions have varied. Initially, one spokesperson stated that members of the group "have got some wrong information" about Scientology. Another referred to them as "computer geeks". Later, the Church of Scientology started referring to Anonymous as "cyberterrorists" perpetrating "religious hate crimes" against the church.

Detractors of Scientology have also criticized the actions of Project Chanology, asserting that they merely provide the Church of Scientology with the opportunity to "play the religious persecution card". Other critics such as Mark Bunker and Tory Christman initially questioned the legality of Project Chanology's methods, but have since spoken out in support of the project as it shifted towards nonviolent protests and other legal methods.

== Background ==
The Church of Scientology has a history of conflict with groups on the Internet. In 1995, attorneys for the Church of Scientology attempted to get the newsgroup alt.religion.scientology (a.r.s.) removed from Usenet. This attempt backfired and generated a significant amount of press for a.r.s. The conflict with a.r.s led the hacker group Cult of the Dead Cow to declare war on the Church of Scientology. The Church of Scientology mounted a 10-year legal campaign against Dutch writer Karin Spaink and several Internet service providers after Spaink and others posted documents alleged to be secret teachings of the organization. The Church of Scientology's efforts ended in a legal defeat in a Dutch court in 2005. This series of events is often referred to as "Scientology versus the Internet".

=== Tom Cruise video ===
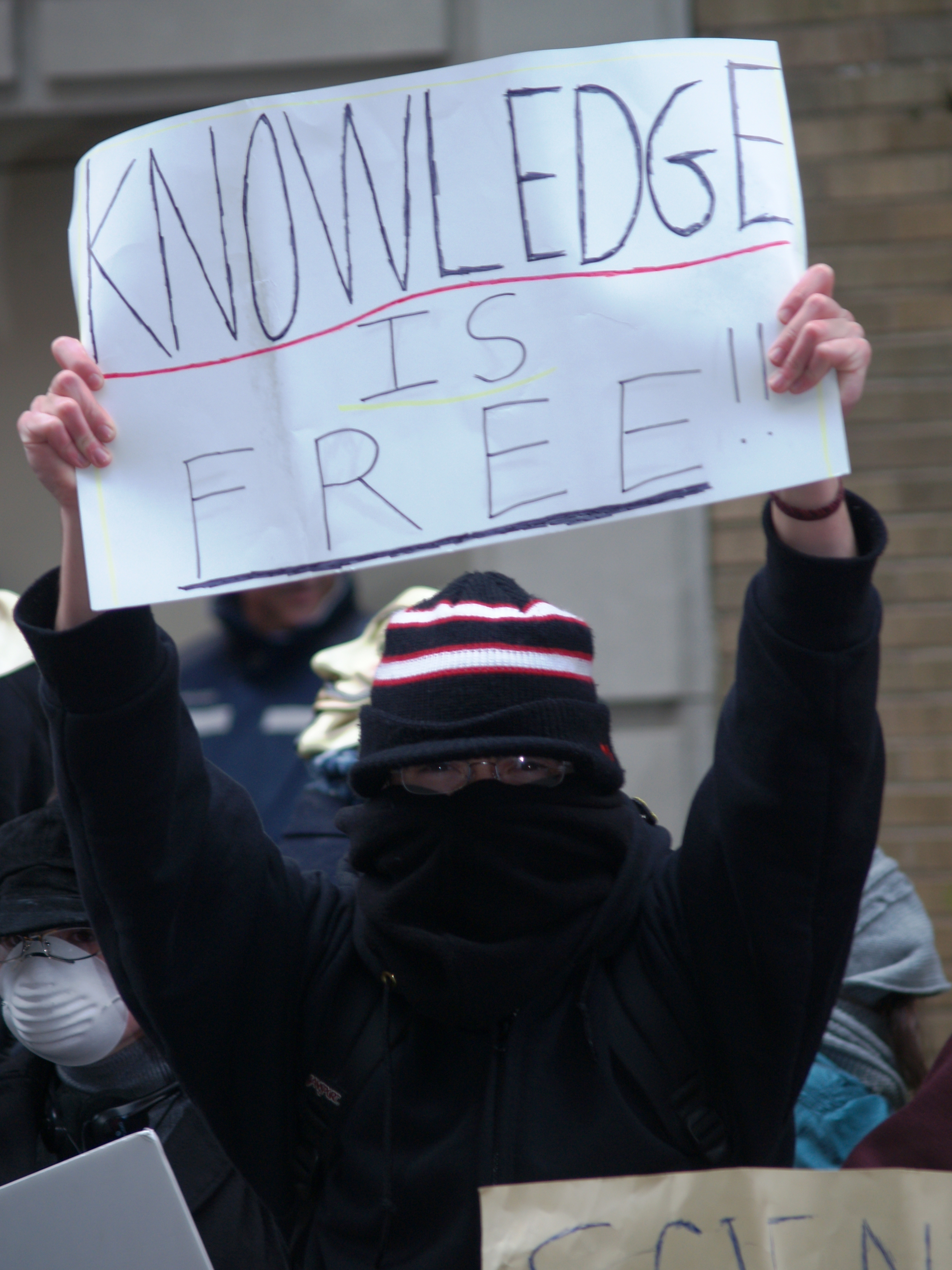
Removal of the Tom Cruise Scientology video from YouTube prompted allegations that Scientology is censoring information about itself.

On January 14, 2008, a video produced by the Church of Scientology featuring an interview with the actor Tom Cruise was posted on YouTube. In the video, music from Cruise's Mission: Impossible films plays in the background, and Cruise makes various statements, including saying that Scientologists are the only people who can help after a car accident and that Scientologists are the authority on getting addicts off drugs. According to The Times, Cruise can be seen in the video "extolling the virtues of Scientology". The Australian newspaper The Daily Telegraph characterized Cruise as "manic-looking", "gush[ing] about his love for Scientology".

The Church of Scientology asserted that the video material was "pirated and edited" and taken from a three-hour video produced for members of Scientology. YouTube removed the Cruise video from their site under threat of litigation. The website Gawker did not take down their copy of the Tom Cruise video, and other sites have posted the entire video. Lawyers for the Church of Scientology wrote to Gawker requesting the removal of the video, but Nick Denton of Gawker stated: "It's newsworthy and we will not be removing it."

=== Formation ===
Project Chanology was formulated by users of the English-speaking imageboards 711chan.org and 4chan, the associated partyvan.info wiki, and several Internet Relay Chat channels, all part of a group collectively known as Anonymous, on January 16, 2008, after the Church of Scientology issued a copyright violation claim against YouTube for hosting material from the Cruise video. The effort against Scientology has also been referred to by group members as "Operation Chanology". A webpage called "Project Chanology", part of a larger wiki, is maintained by Anonymous and chronicles planned, ongoing and completed actions by project participants. The website includes a list of suggested guerrilla tactics to use against the Church of Scientology. Members use other websites as well to coordinate action, including Encyclopedia Dramatica and the social networking site Facebook, where two groups associated with the movement had 3,500 members as of February 4, 2008. A member of Anonymous told the Los Angeles Times that, as of February 4, 2008, the group consisted of "a loose confederation of about 9,000 people" who post anonymously on the Internet. A security analyst told The Age that the number of people participating anonymously in Project Chanology could number in the thousands: "You can't pin it on a person or a group of people. You've thousands of people engaged to do anything they can against Scientology."

Members of Project Chanology say their main goal is "to enlighten the Church of Scientology (CoS) by any means necessary." Their website states: "This will be a game of mental warfare. It will require our talkers, not our hackers. It will require our dedicated Anon across the world to do their part." Project Chanology's stated goals include the complete removal of the Church of Scientology's presence from the Internet and to "save people from Scientology by reversing the brainwashing". Project Chanology participants plan to join the Church of Scientology posing as interested members in order to infiltrate the organization.

Andrea Seabrook of National Public Radio's All Things Considered reported Anonymous was previously known for "technologically sophisticated pranks" such as spamming chat rooms online and "ordering dozens of pizzas for people they don't like". Ryan Singel of Wired appeared on the program on January 27, 2008, and told Seabrook that members of Anonymous were motivated by "the tactics the Church of Scientology uses to control information about itself" rather than the "controversial nature of Scientology itself".

== Activities ==
=== Internet activities ===
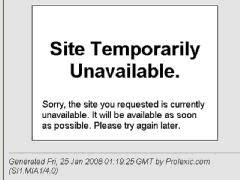
Error message shown by Prolexic Technologies during the January 25, 2008 denial-of-service attack on Scientology.org

Project Chanology began its campaign by organizing and delivering a series of denial-of-service attacks against Scientology websites and flooding Scientology centers with prank calls and black faxes. The group was successful in taking down local and global Scientology websites intermittently from January 18, 2008, until at least January 25, 2008. Anonymous had early success rendering major Scientology websites inaccessible and leaking documents allegedly stolen from Scientology computers. This resulted in a large amount of coverage on social bookmarking websites.

The denial-of-service attacks on Scientology.org flooded the site with 220 megabits of traffic, a mid-range attack. Speaking with SCMagazineUS.com, a security strategist for Top Layer Networks, Ken Pappas said that he thought that botnets were involved in the Anonymous operation: "There are circles out there where you could take ownership of the bot machines that are already owned and launch a simultaneous attack against [something] like the church from 50,000 PCs, all at the same time".

In response to the attacks, on January 21, 2008, the Scientology.org site was moved to Prolexic Technologies, a company specializing in safeguarding web sites from denial-of-service attacks. Attacks against the site increased, and CNET News reported that "a major assault" took place at 6 p.m. EST on January 24, 2008. Anonymous escalated the attack on Scientology on January 25, 2008, and on January 25, 2008, the Church of Scientology's official website remained inaccessible.

"Message to Scientology" video (January 21, 2008)

On January 21, 2008, Anonymous announced its goals and intentions via a video posted to YouTube entitled "Message to Scientology", and a press release declaring "War on Scientology", against both the Church of Scientology and the Religious Technology Center. In the press release, the group stated that the attacks against the Church of Scientology would continue in order to protect freedom of speech and to end what they characterized as the financial exploitation of church members.

The Tom Cruise video is referred to specifically at the start of the Anonymous YouTube video posting, and is characterized as a "propaganda video". The video utilizes a synthesized voice and shows floating cloud images using a time lapse method as the speaker addresses the leaders of Scientology directly: "We shall proceed to expel you from the Internet and systematically dismantle the Church of Scientology in its present form [...]" The video goes on to state: "We recognize you as serious opponents, and do not expect our campaign to be completed in a short time frame. However, you will not prevail forever against the angry masses of the body politic. Your choice of methods, your hypocrisy, and the general artlessness of your organization have sounded its death knell. You have nowhere to hide because we are everywhere [...] We are Anonymous. We are Legion. We do not forgive. We do not forget. Expect us." By January 25, 2008, only four days after its release, the video had been viewed 800,000 times, and by February 8, 2008, had been viewed over 2 million times. Author Warren Ellis called the video "creepy in and of itself" and a "manifesto, declaration of war, sharp political film".

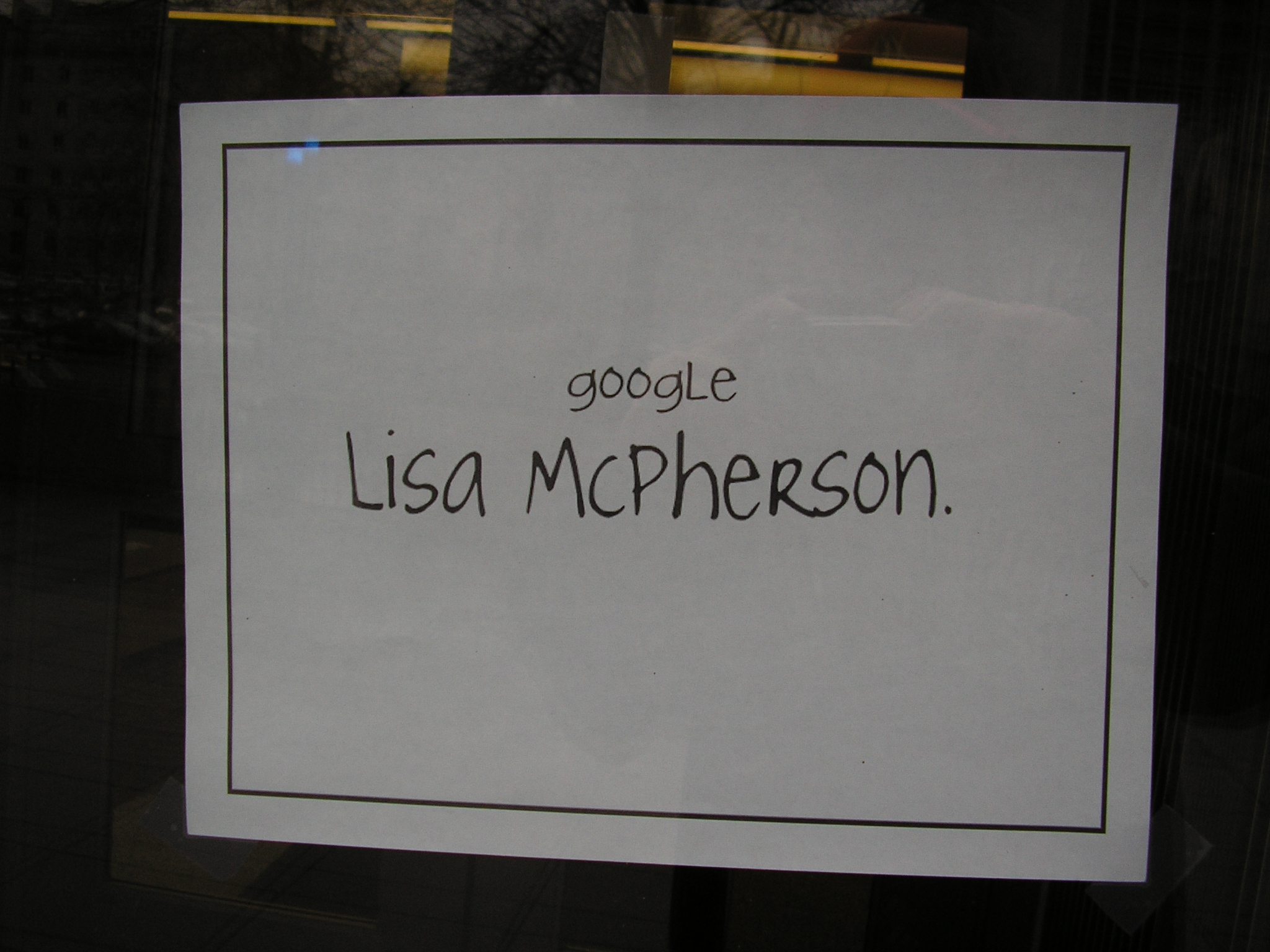
A flyer asking passersby to research the death of Lisa McPherson. The flyer appeared during Project Chanology at Litchfield Towers, University of Pittsburgh, January 29, 2008.

In a different video posted to YouTube, Anonymous addresses news organizations covering the conflict and criticizes media reporting of the incident. In the video, Anonymous criticizes the media specifically for not mentioning objections by the group to certain controversial aspects of the history of the Church of Scientology, and cited past incidents including the death of Lisa McPherson: "We find it interesting that you did not mention the other objections in your news reporting. The stifling and punishment of dissent within the totalitarian organization of Scientology. The numerous, alleged human rights violations. Such as the treatment and events that led to the deaths of victims of the cult such as Lisa McPherson." Lisa McPherson was a Scientologist who died in 1995 under controversial circumstances. The Church of Scientology was held responsible and initially faced felony charges in her death. The charges were later dropped and a civil suit brought by McPherson's family was settled in 2004. This second video was removed on January 25, 2008, YouTube citing a "terms of use violation". Organizers of the February 10, 2008, Project Chanology protests against the Church of Scientology told the St. Petersburg Times the event was timed to coincide with the birthday of Lisa McPherson.

In addition to DDoS attacks against Church of Scientology websites, Anonymous also organized a campaign on one of their websites to "begin bumping Digg", referring to an attempt to drive up Scientology-related links on the website Digg.com. On January 25, 2008, eight of the top ten stories on Digg.com were about either Scientology-related controversies or Anonymous and attempts to expose Scientology. Digg CEO Jay Adelson told PC World that Anonymous had not manipulated the site's algorithm system to prevent artificial poll results, stating: "They must have done a very good job of bringing in a diverse set of interests ... It just happened to hit a nerve that the Digg community was interested in." Adelson said two other instances which similarly have dominated the Digg main page in the past were the Virginia Tech Massacre in the aftermath of the incident and the "7/7" London bombings in 2005. Adelson commented on the popularity of Scientology theme within the Digg community: "In the history of Digg, there's no question that the topic of Scientology has been of great interest to the community ... I can't explain why."

On January 29, 2008, Jason Lee Miller of WebProNews reported that a Google bomb technique had been used to make the Scientology.org main website the first result in a Google search for "dangerous cult". Miller wrote that Anonymous was behind the Google bomb, and that they had also tried to bump Scientology up as the first result in Google searches for "brainwashing cult", and to make the Xenu.net website first result in searches for "scientology". Rob Garner of MediaPost Publications wrote: "The Church of Scientology continues to be the target of a group called Anonymous, which is using Google bombs and YouTube as its tools of choice."

In a February 4, 2008, article, Scientology spokeswoman Karin Pouw told the Los Angeles Times that Church of Scientology's websites "have been and are online." Danny McPherson, chief research officer at Arbor Networks, claimed 500 denial-of-service attacks had been observed on the Scientology site in the week prior to February 4, some of which were strong enough to bring the website down. Calling Anonymous a "motley crew of internet troublemakers", Wired blogger Ryan Singel said that, while attempting to bypass the Prolexic servers protecting the Church of Scientology website, users of a misconfigured DDoS tool inadvertently and briefly had targeted the Etty Hillesum Lyceum, a Dutch secondary school in Deventer. Another hacking group associated with the project, calling themselves the "g00ns", mistakenly targeted a 59-year-old man from Stockton, California. They posted his home telephone number, address and his wife's Social Security number online for other people to target. They believed that he was behind counter-attacks against Project Chanology-related websites by the Regime, a counter-hack group who crashed one of the Project Chanology planning websites. The group allegedly attempted to gain personal information on people involved in Project Chanology to turn that information over to the Church of Scientology. After discovering they had wrongly targeted the couple, one of the members of the g00ns group called and apologized.

=== Protests planned ===
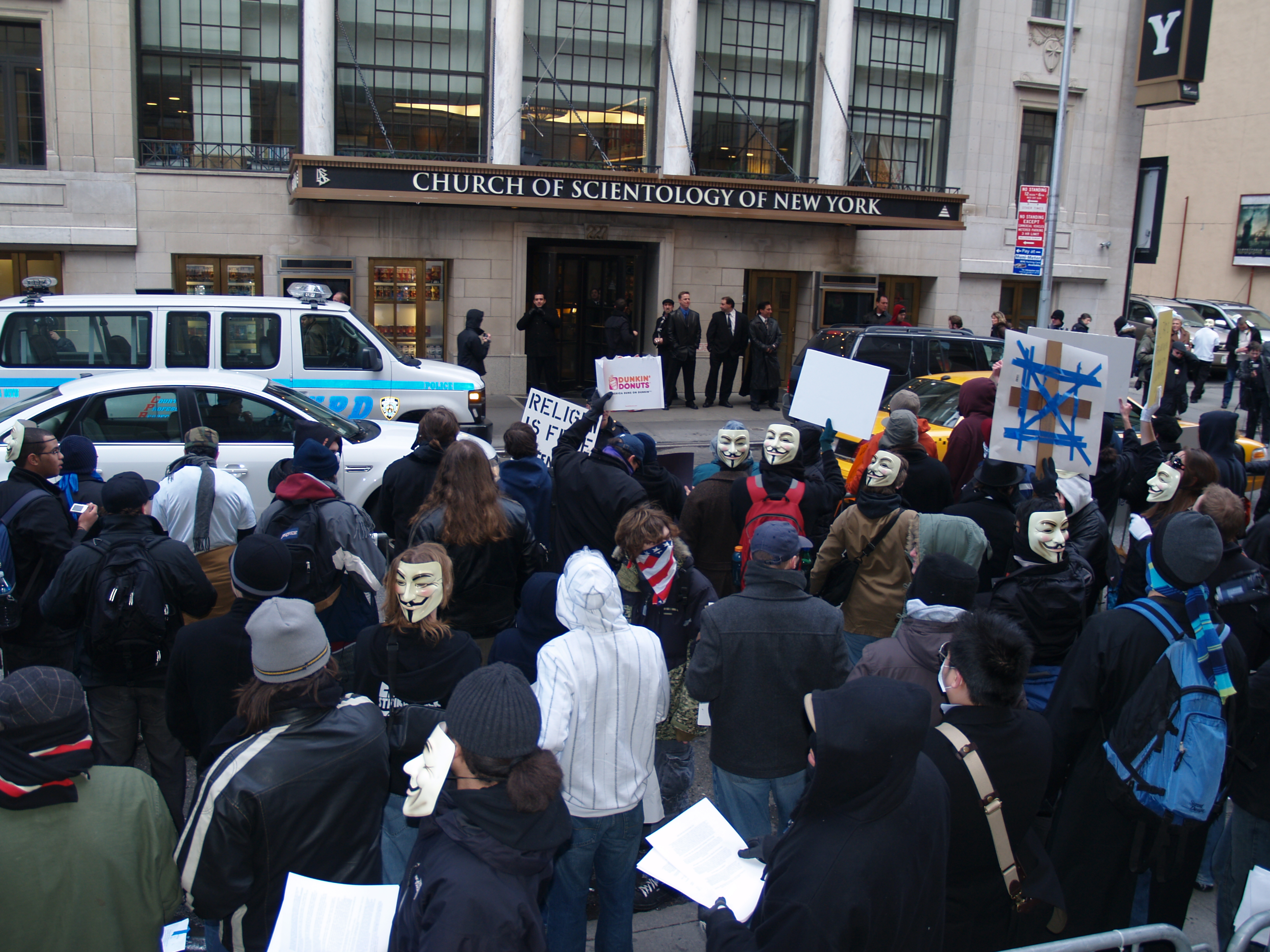
Guy Fawkes-masked protesters gather at the Scientology center in Times Square, New York City, on February 10, 2008.

A new video entitled "Call to Action" appeared on YouTube on January 28, 2008, calling for protests outside Church of Scientology centers on February 10, 2008. As with the previous videos, the two-minute video used a synthesized computer voice and featured stock footage of clouds and sky. The video was accompanied by a text transcript with British English spelling. The video denied that the group was composed of "super hackers", stating: "Contrary to the assumptions of the media, Anonymous is not 'a group of super hackers.' ... Anonymous is everyone and everywhere. We have no leaders, no single entity directing us." The video said that Project Chanology participants include "individuals from all walks of life ... united by an awareness that someone must do the right thing." Specific controversies involving the CoS were cited in the video as the explanation for actions by Anonymous.

In an email to CNET News, Anonymous stated that coordinated activities were planned for February 10, 2008, in many major cities around the world. Anonymous hoped to use "real world" protests to rally public opinion to their cause. According to the Associated Press, the protests were meant to draw attention to what the group refers to as a "vast money-making scheme under the guise of 'religion'". By January 30, 2008, 170 protests had been planned outside Church of Scientology centers worldwide. A video posted to YouTube called "Code of Conduct" outlined twenty-two rules to follow when protesting, and urged protestors to remain peaceful.

=== February 2008 ===
==== February 2 ====
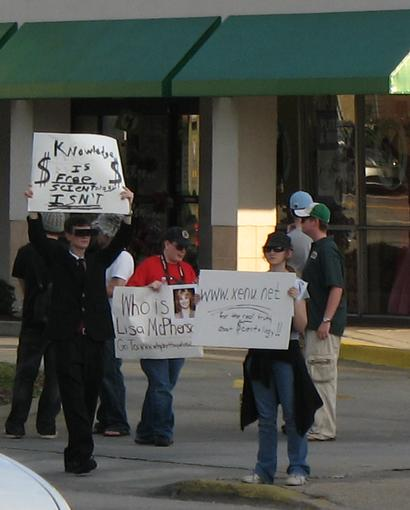
Project Chanology members, protesting outside Church of Scientology in Orlando, Florida on February 2, 2008

On February 2, 2008, 150 people gathered outside a Church of Scientology center in Orlando, Florida to protest the organization's practices. Small protests were also held in Santa Barbara, California (during the Santa Barbara International Film Festival), and Manchester, England. Protesters in Orlando carried signs with messages "Knowledge is Free" and "Honk if you hate Scientology". According to WKMG-TV, the protesters called the Church of Scientology a "dangerous cult" and said the organization is responsible for crimes and deaths. The Orlando Sentinel reported that the protest was "part of a worldwide campaign by a group that calls itself Anonymous", and an unnamed organizer who spoke to the paper stated that the group was protesting "a gross violation of the right to see free church material", referring to the Tom Cruise video that was pulled from YouTube.

Protesters at the demonstration wore masks, and said they were attempting to inform the public about what they believed to be "restrictions of free speech and profiteering through pyramid schemes" by the Church of Scientology. They asserted they were not protesting the doctrine of Scientology, but rather alleged actions of individual Scientologists. One protester stated that he had created a Facebook group to organize the protest, explaining "It started online with a group called Anonymous ... They got upset with Scientology because the church hides important documents that are supposed to be released to the public."

==== February 10 ====
On February 10, 2008, about 7,000 people protested in at least 100 cities worldwide. Within 24 hours of the first protest, a search for "Scientology" and "protest" on Google Blog Search returned more than 4,000 results and more than 2,000 pictures on the image-sharing site Flickr. Cities with turnouts of one hundred or more protesters included Adelaide, Melbourne, and Sydney, in Australia; Toronto in Canada; London in England; Dublin, Ireland; and Austin, Dallas, Boston, Clearwater, and New York City in the United States.

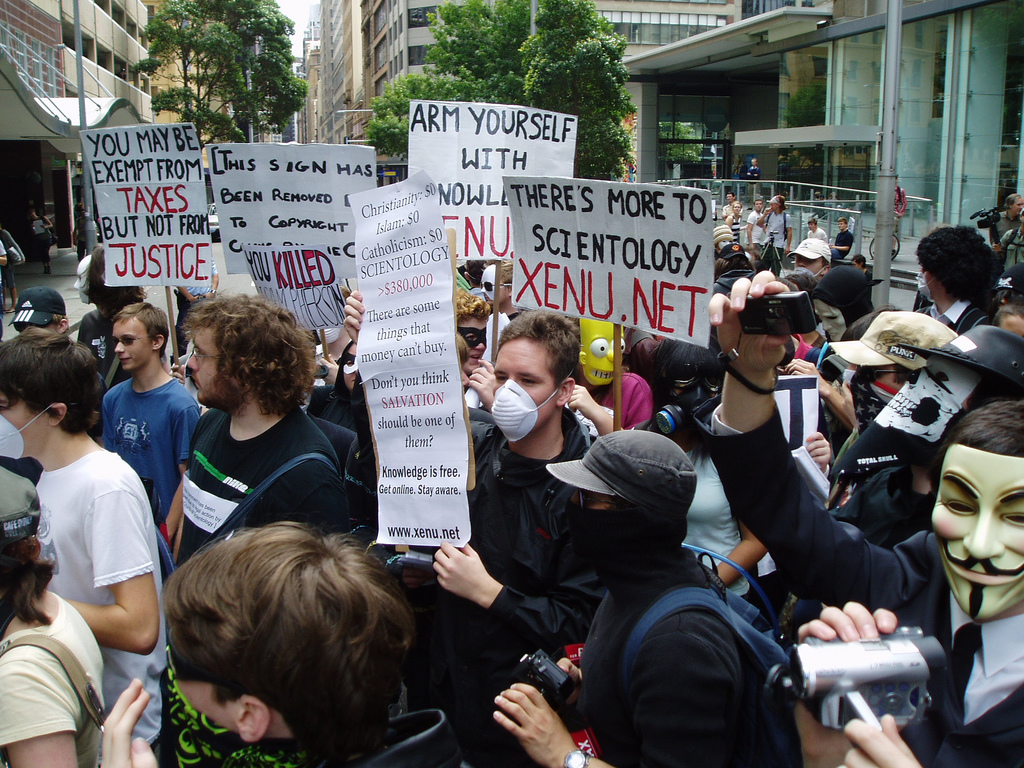
Project Chanology members protesting at the Church of Scientology building in Sydney on February 10, 2008

150 people protested at the Church of Scientology building in Sydney, Australia, carrying signs and wearing costumes. Participants were masked to maintain their anonymity and avoid possible retaliation from the Church of Scientology. Protesters chanted "Church on the left, cult on the right" (in reference to the Church that was beside the Church of Scientology building), "Religion is free" and "We want Xenu". Scientology staff locked down the building and set up a camera to record the event. After the protest in Sydney, a surge in online Internet traffic due to individuals attempting to view pictures from the protest crashed hundreds of websites when a server was overloaded. The Sydney protest was one of the first worldwide, and after the first images of the protest went online a surge in traffic drove the hosting company's bandwidth usage up by 900 percent. The hosting company Digitalis temporarily prevented access to hundreds of its clients' sites, and customer support representative Denis Kukic said the surge was unexpected: "We had no advance notice that there was going to be a sudden surge of traffic or that there would be more than 100 times the average traffic that this customer's website normally consumes."

Masked protesters in Seattle, Washington, United States congregated in front of the Church of Scientology of Washington. Protesters were quoted as saying, "We believe in total freedom of belief. We have nothing against the people of Scientology, however the Church of Scientology has committed crimes. They're vehemently anti-opposition. Anyone who opposes them, must go down." A protester in Santa Barbara emphasized that their opposition was against the organization, not the belief system, and that they supported the Scientology split-off group known as the Free Zone. Protesters turned out in Pittsburgh, Pennsylvania despite unusually cold weather. The masked crowd consisted mainly of college students, including some who had travelled from as far as Penn State University.

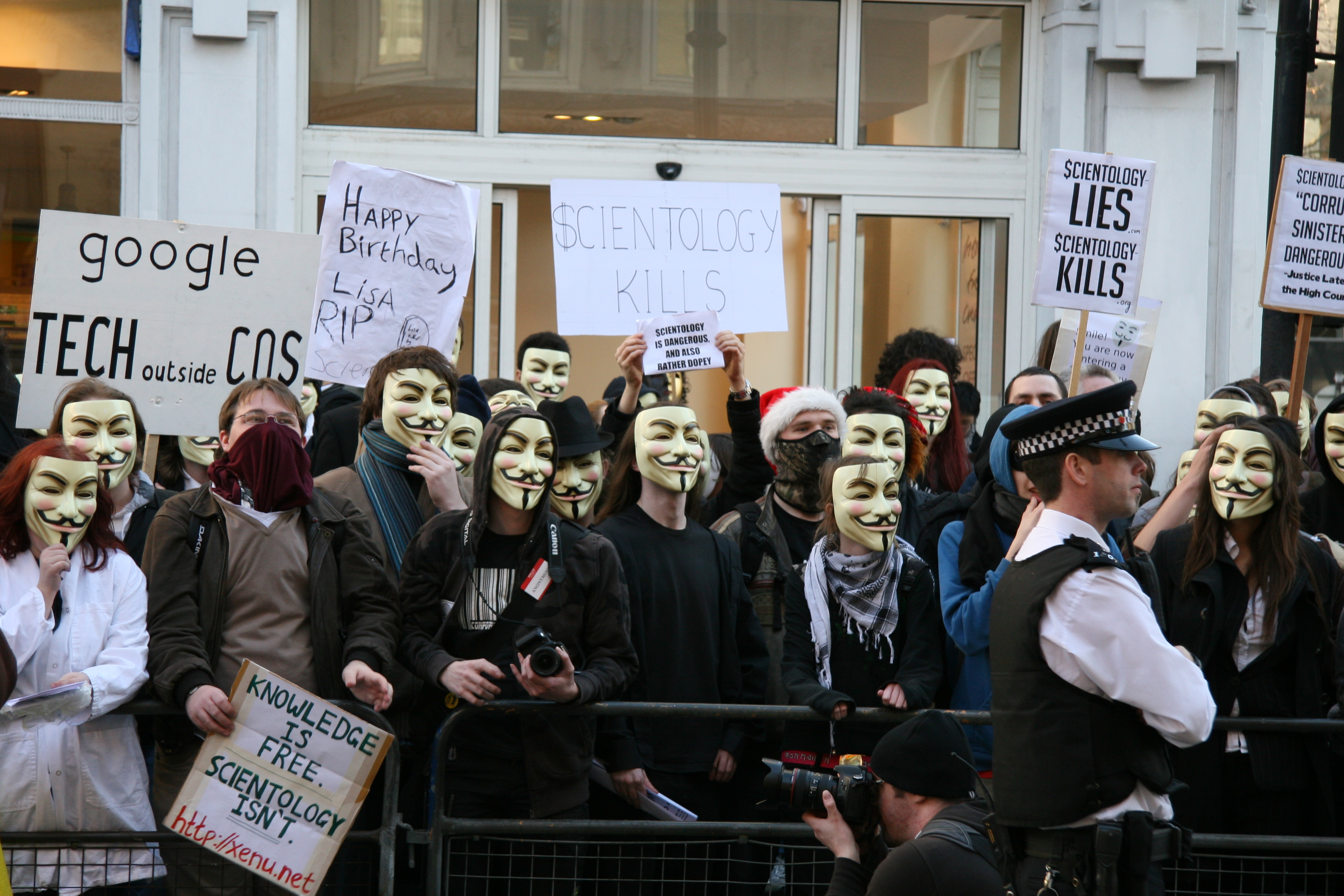
Protesters wearing Guy Fawkes masks from the V for Vendetta film, at February 10, 2008 protest in London

Protesters in Boston, Los Angeles, Pittsburgh, Toronto, Edinburgh, London, and other cities worldwide, wore Guy Fawkes masks modeled after the 2005 film V for Vendetta. Guy Fawkes was an English Catholic executed for a 1605 attempt to destroy the House of Lords. In V for Vendetta, a rebel against a near-future fascist regime uses the mask in his public appearances and distributes many of its copies to the population to enable mass protests. The Boston Globe characterized usage of the Guy Fawkes masks as "an allusion to the British insurgent and a film depicting an antigovernment movement". Aaron Tavena of College Times wrote that the Guy Fawkes masks provided a "dramatic effect" to the protests, and Nick Jamison of The Retriever Weekly wrote: "During the February 10 protests, Anonymous was informative, Anonymous was peaceful, and Anonymous was effective. After seeing all of the pictures from the 10th with everyone in disguise, many sporting Guy Fawkes masks, I wanted to be a part of that." Scott Stewart of University of Nebraska at Omaha's The Gateway wrote: "Many participants sported Guy Fawkes masks to draw attention both to their identity as Anonymous and the Church of Scientology's abuse of litigation and coercion to suppress anti-Scientology viewpoints."

The Internet meme Rickroll, where a link is given to a seemingly relevant website only to be directed to a music video of singer Rick Astley's pop single "Never Gonna Give You Up", has been used as a theme in the protests against Scientology. At February 10 protests in New York, Washington, D.C., London and Seattle, protesters played the song through boomboxes and shouted the phrase "Never gonna let you down!", in what The Guardian called "a live rick-rolling of the Church of Scientology". In response to a website created by Scientologists showing an anti-Anonymous video, Project Chanology participants created a website with a similar domain name with a video displaying the music video to "Never Gonna Give You Up". In a March 2008 interview, Astley said that he found the rickrolling of Scientology to be "hilarious"; he also said that he will not try to capitalize on the rickroll phenomenon with a new recording or remix of his own, but that he'd be happy to have other artists remix it.

Following the protests, there were reports that YouTube was freezing the view counts on videos criticizing Scientology, including clips from the protests themselves, potentially preventing them from being displayed on YouTube's front page. Similarly, the original "Message to Scientology" video had received nearly 2.5 million views and yet failed to be featured as a "most-watched". The net neutrality activist group movieLOL strongly criticized YouTube for a "display of the decay of internet freedom". YouTube's official response stated: "There was an issue with video view counts not increasing that has now been resolved. The correct number of views should be displayed in the next 24 hours. Thanks for your patience."

Jonathan Holmes, the presenter of the Australian watchdog program Media Watch, reported on two cases of media censorship of the protests. News.com.au pixelated a poster carried by a protester which was revealed, through a Today Tonight segment, to have displayed the word "CULT". The Advertiser erased Tom Cruise's name from a protest placard, rendering the placard's message meaningless, without informing its readers. The Advertiser's editor, Melvin Mansell, stated that the alteration had "slipped by" and that he was opposed to the publication of doctored photographs.

Project Chanology protests, February 10, 2008
City	State	Country	Protesters	Min	Max
Adelaide	South Australia	Australia	150	150	150
Amsterdam		Netherlands	N/A, 50	50	50
Anchorage	Alaska	United States	8	8	8
Atlanta	Georgia	United States	100	50	50
Austin	Texas	United States	N/A, 200	200	200
Berlin		Germany	N/A, 30	30	30
Birmingham		England	150N/A	50	150
Boston	Massachusetts	United States	50, 100, 200	50	200
Brussels		Belgium	N/A, 20–30	20	30
Buffalo	New York	United States	N/A, 25	25	25
Champaign	Illinois	United States	N/A		
Charlotte	North Carolina	United States	N/A		
Chicago	Illinois	United States	N/A		
Clearwater	Florida	United States	N/A, 100, 180, 200[110][111][112]	100	200
Columbus	Ohio	United States	100	100	100
Dallas	Texas	United States	100	100	100
Dublin		Republic of Ireland	100	100	100
Edinburgh		Scotland	30, 150	30	150
Edmonton	Alberta	Canada	36	36	36
Farmington Hills	Michigan	United States	N/A, 30–100	30	100
Honolulu	Hawaii	United States	N/A		
Houston	Texas	United States	N/A		
Kitchener	Ontario	Canada	20	20	20
London		England	200, 300, 500, 500–1000	200	1000
Los Angeles	California	United States	N/A, 500	500	500
Melbourne	Victoria	Australia	200	200	200
Milwaukee	Wisconsin	United States	N/A		
Montreal	Quebec	Canada	N/A, 50	50	50
New Haven	Connecticut	United States	25	25	25
New York City	New York	United States	200–300	200	300
Orlando	Florida	United States	N/A		
Oslo		Norway	30–50, 40–50	30	50
Ottawa	Ontario	Canada	N/A, 12	12	12
Philadelphia	Pennsylvania	United States	N/A, 150	150	150
Phoenix	Arizona	United States	N/A, 40, 60	40	60
Pittsburgh	Pennsylvania	United States	40–50	40	50
Plymouth		England	12	12	12
Portland	Oregon	United States	N/A		
Salt Lake City	Utah	United States	N/A		
San Diego	California	United States	50	45	75
San Francisco	California	United States	100	100	100
Santa Barbara	California	United States	N/A, 30	30	30
Santa Cruz	California	United States	5	5	5
Seattle	Washington	United States	N/A		
St. Louis	Missouri	United States	50	50	50
Sydney	New South Wales	Australia	150, 200	150	200
Toronto	Ontario	Canada	N/A, 150, 200	150	200
Vancouver	British Columbia	Canada	N/A		
Washington, D.C.	District of Columbia	United States	200	200	200
Wichita	Kansas	United States	N/A		
Winnipeg	Manitoba	Canada	N/A, 50	50	50
York		England	20, 30	20	30
Total number of protesters			6000, 7000, 6000–8000, 8300	6000	8300
Total number of cities			90, 93, 100	90	100
Total number of countries			14	14	14

=== March–December 2008 ===
==== March 2008 ====
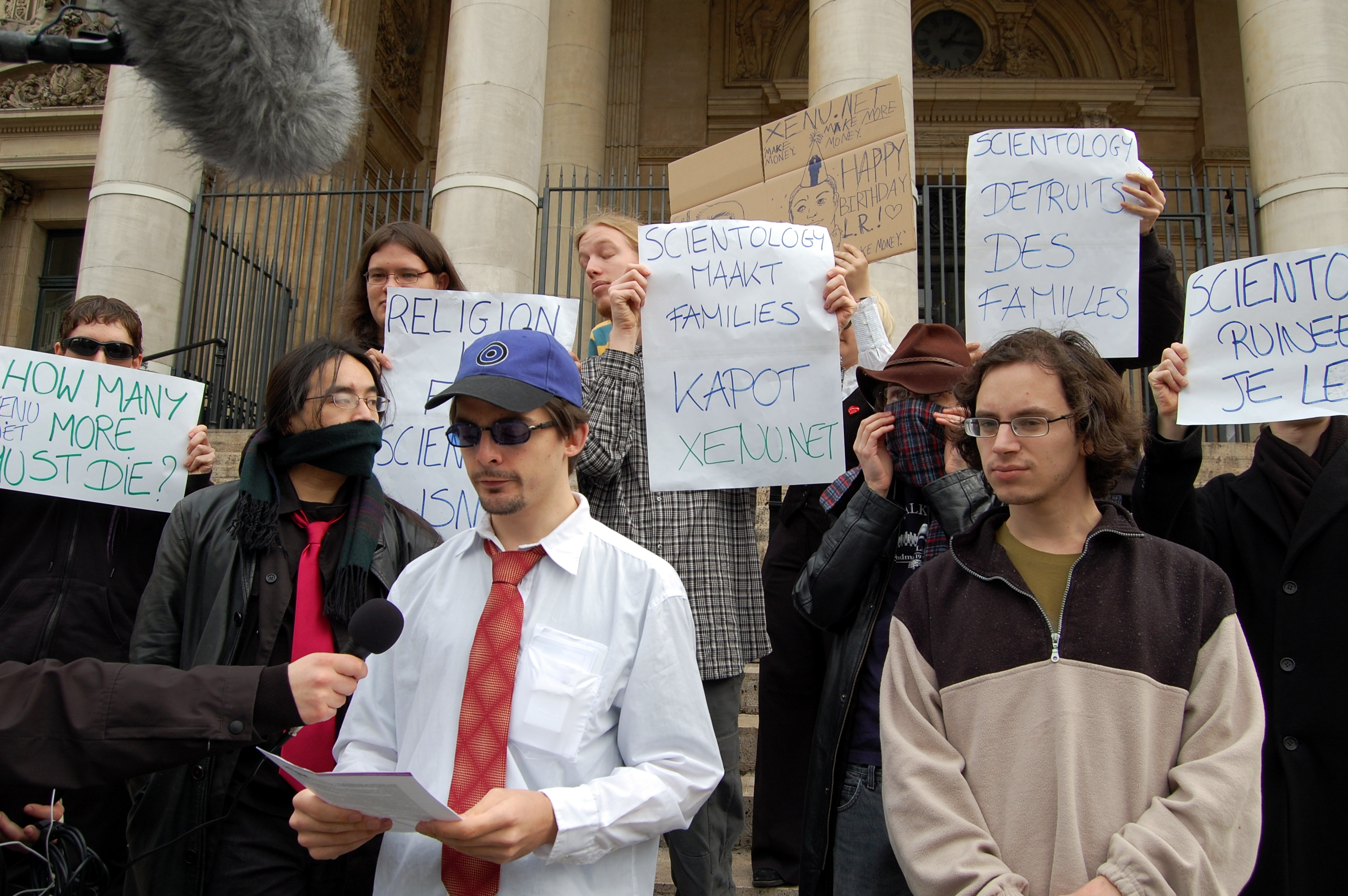
A protester at the Bourse Palace in Brussels, Belgium, reads from a prepared speech on March 15, 2008.

According to NBC11, a woman from Anonymous contacted them and stated that protests were planned against Scientology each month through May 2008; and that a large protest was planned for two days after Scientology founder L. Ron Hubbard's birthday, March 15. Carlos Moncada of The Tampa Tribune reported that an "open letter to the press from Anonymous" was sent out via e-mail, and states that a protest is planned for March 15, 2008. The e-mail refers to the Ides of March: "We, too, wish to celebrate this event, albeit in our own special way ... Beware the Ides of March, Church of Scientology!" The March protests were titled "Operation Party Hard".

Protests began in Australia on March 15, 2008, and were followed by protests in major cities worldwide including Brussels, London, Seattle, Phoenix, Manchester, and Los Angeles. Approximately 7,000 to 8,000 people protested in about 100 cities worldwide. The protests took place in locations in Australia, Europe, Canada, and the United States.

Riot police, arresting protesters near Atlanta, Georgia, on March 15, 2008

Approximately 200 masked protesters gathered outside the Church of Scientology's headquarters in Adelaide, Australia. An anonymous spokesman told News.com.au that Scientology should lose its tax-exempt status. About 150 protesters came to the Yonge Street headquarters of Scientology in Toronto, Canada; sang "Happy Birthday" and chanted "we want cake". During the Los Angeles protests, a plane flew overhead trailing a large sign that read "Honk if you think Scientology is a cult." 150 protesters demonstrated in Clearwater, Florida, and a local organizer for Anonymous told The Tampa Tribune, "We feel that we have an obligation to educate the public about the things that have gone on and hopefully make the Church of Scientology understand that they have to change."

Two people were arrested by DeKalb County, Georgia, police for using megaphones while stepping onto the surrounding street opposite of the church during a protest. The Atlanta Journal-Constitution reported that five protesters were cited for "causing 'hazardous' or 'offensive' conditions", and that eight motorists were pulled over by police and ticketed for excessive use of horns, after they honked while driving past the protest. The American Civil Liberties Union and Amnesty International investigated the reaction of the police at the Atlanta protest. In contrast, a Los Angeles Police Department officer at the Los Angeles protest was widely praised after a video was uploaded to YouTube showing him acknowledging the demonstrators' right to protest and encouraging them to stay on the sidewalk for their own safety.

Project Chanology protests, March 15, 2008
City	State	Country	Protesters	Min	Max
Adelaide	South Australia	Australia	N/A, 200	200	200
Amsterdam		Netherlands	N/A, 120	120	120
Atlanta	Georgia	United States	N/A		
Auckland		New Zealand	20, 30	20	30
Battle Creek	Michigan	United States	40	40	40
Berlin	Berlin	Germany	N/A, 50	50	50
Birmingham		England	100	100	100
Boise	Idaho	United States	8	8	8
Brisbane	Queensland	Australia	N/A		
Brussels		Belgium	N/A		
Cincinnati	Ohio	United States	50	50	50
Clearwater	Florida	United States	N/A, 75, 100, 150, 200	75	200
Columbus	Ohio	United States	80, 100	80	100
Dublin		Republic of Ireland	25	25	25
Düsseldorf	North Rhine-Westphalia	Germany	N/A		
Englewood (Denver)	Colorado	United States	90	90	90
Frankfurt	Hesse	Germany	N/A		
Lahti		Finland	50, 70	50	70
London		England	N/A, 650	650	650
Los Angeles	California	United States	N/A, 300–600	300	600
Manchester		England	N/A, 250	250	250
Melbourne	Victoria	Australia	N/A		
Milwaukee	Wisconsin	United States	N/A		
Mountain View	California	United States	N/A, 20	20	20
Munich	Bavaria	Germany	N/A		
New York City	New York	United States	300, 500	300	500
Perth	Western Australia	Australia	N/A		
Philadelphia	Pennsylvania	United States	50–100, 200	50	200
Phoenix	Arizona	United States	N/A, 50–60	50	60
Plymouth		England	30	30	30
Richmond	Virginia	United States	30	30	30
San Francisco	California	United States	300	300	300
Seattle	Washington	United States	N/A		
Sunderland		England	N/A		
Sydney	New South Wales	Australia	N/A		
Toronto	Ontario	Canada	150, 200, 250	150	250
Washington, D.C.	District of Columbia	United States	N/A, 300	300	300
Winnipeg	Manitoba	Canada	N/A, 30	30	30
York		England	20	20	20
Total number of protesters			6700, 7000–8000	6700	7525
Total number of cities			50, 100	50	100

==== April 2008 ====
Anonymous held its third international protest against Scientology on April 12, 2008. Named "Operation Reconnect", the protest focused on increasing awareness of the Church of Scientology's disconnection policy. Protesters around the world gathered in over 50 cities, including Toronto, London, Sydney, and Berlin. A subsequent international protest was planned for May 10, 2008, according to The University Register it was titled "Operation Battletoad Earth", and an additional protest was planned for June 2008. According to John DeSio of The Village Voice, the May 10, 2008 protests were referred to as "Operation : Fair Game : Stop", and National Nine News has reported that the full title of the May 10 protests is "Battletoad Earth: Operation Fairgame Stop". The May 10 date was chosen as May 9 is the anniversary of Scientology founder L. Ron Hubbard's book Dianetics: The Modern Science of Mental Health. Over 400 people were present at the May 10, 2008, protests in cities in Australia. Wen Hsing, a member of Anonymous, commented to scopical.com.au about the Church of Scientology's denial of its "fair game" policy: "Even if the name 'fair game' is not in use, the Church of Scientology is an organization that continues to practice a vicious policy of retribution against perceived enemies, and it teaches its members that extreme measures are morally justified if they aid the Church."

Project Chanology protests, April 12, 2008
City	State	Country	Protesters	Min	Max
Amsterdam		Netherlands	N/A		
Auckland		New Zealand	20	20	20
Berlin		Germany	N/A, 50, 100	50	100
Biloxi	Mississippi	United States	N/A		
Birmingham		England	70	70	70
Boston	Massachusetts	United States	N/A, 150	150	150
Clearwater	Florida	United States	100, 135, 200	100	200
DeKalb County	Georgia	United States	200	200	200
Halifax	Nova Scotia	Canada	N/A		
London		England	N/A, 300	300	300
Madison	Wisconsin	United States	N/A		
Milwaukee	Wisconsin	United States	N/A		
Minneapolis	Minnesota	United States	50, 95	50	95
New York City	New York	United States	N/A		
Paris		France	N/A		
Philadelphia	Pennsylvania	United States	N/A, 100	100	100
Seattle	Washington	United States	N/A		
Sydney	New South Wales	Australia	N/A		
Toronto	Ontario	Canada	N/A		
Vancouver	British Columbia	Canada	30	30	30
Washington, D.C.	District of Columbia	United States	40–50	40	50
Winnipeg	Manitoba	Canada	N/A		
Total number of protesters			4600–5600	4600	5600

==== May 2008 ====
On May 10, a teenager who went to the protests in front of the Queen Victoria Street Church of Scientology in London was issued a court summons after being asked to take down a sign that read "Scientology is not a religion, it is a dangerous cult". Posting anonymously on a forum, the teenager stated "Within five minutes of arriving ... I was told by a member of the police that I was not allowed to use 'that word'". He said that the police told him he had 15 minutes to take down the sign. The teenager did not, citing a 1984 High Court ruling by Mr Justice Latey in which he described the Church of Scientology as a "cult" that was "corrupt, sinister and dangerous". The sign was then confiscated. Shami Chakrabarti, the director of Liberty, a human rights group, said that, "They will be banning words like 'war' and 'tax' from placards and demonstrations next. This is just barmy". On May 23, 2008, the legal action against the boy was dropped. A Crown Prosecution Service (CPS) spokesman said: "In consultation with the City of London Police, we were asked whether the sign was abusive or insulting. Our advice is that it is not abusive or insulting and there is no offensiveness (as opposed to criticism), neither in the idea expressed nor in the mode of expression." Anonymous also held a protest in Budapest, Hungary, at the same time and location as a program of the local Scientology church.

==== June–October 2008 ====
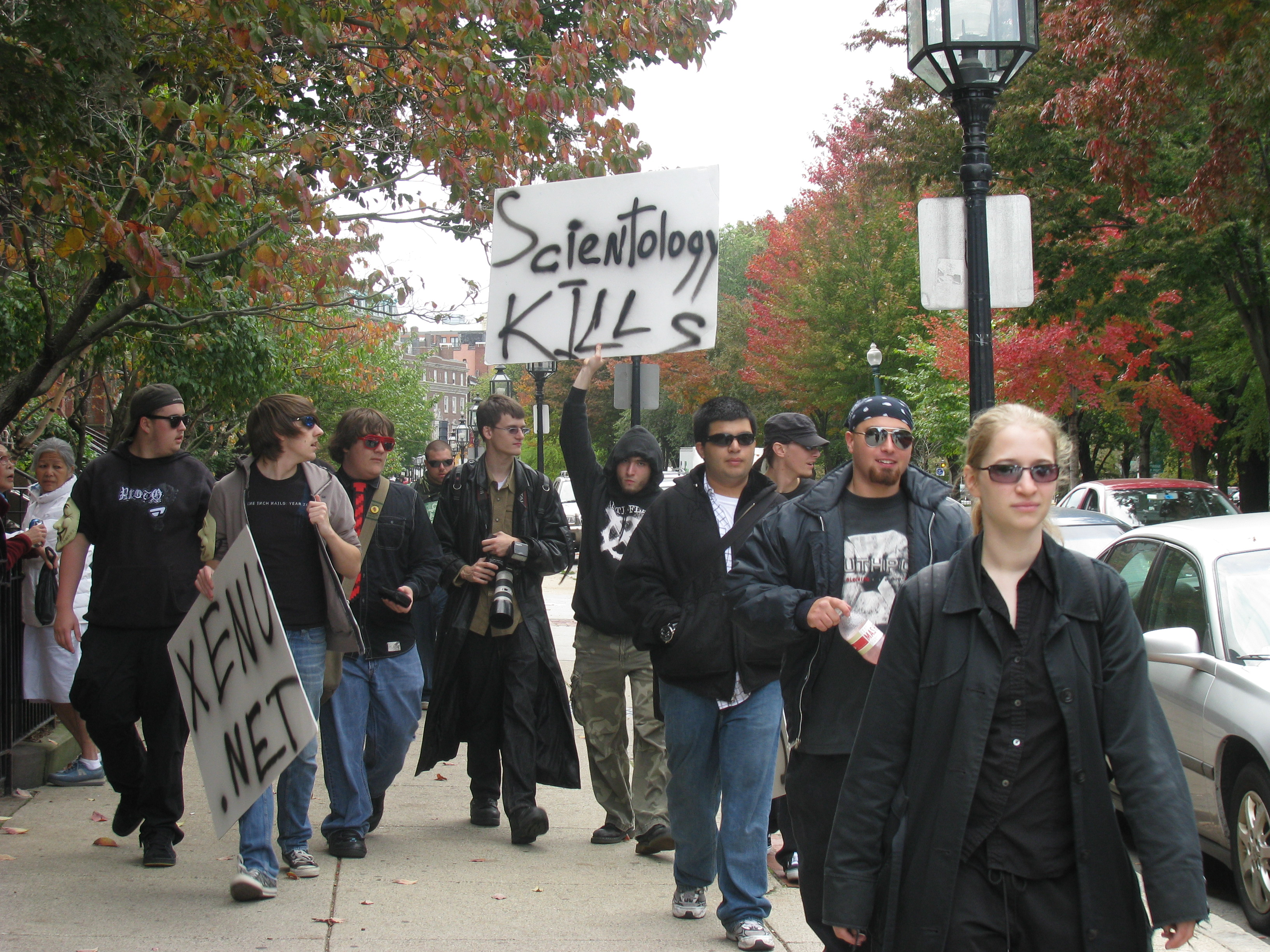
Both New York City and Boston protesters marching down Boston's Commonwealth Avenue on October 11, 2008

A protest was held June 14, 2008 titled "Sea Arrrgh" (a satirical reference to the Church of Scientology's Sea Org). Protesters dressed up as pirates. According to Macquarie National News, members of Anonymous highlighted the controversial practices of the Sea Org, including what the protesters believe to be forced contracts where Scientologists work below a livable wage, that female Sea Org members who become pregnant are pressured to have abortions, and that children of families in the organization are made to perform difficult physical labor. An international protest held on July 12, 2008, titled: "Spy vs. Sci" highlighted the Church of Scientology's Office of Special Affairs. A press release by the group posed the question: "Why does something that describes itself as a religion need an intelligence agency that aggressively persecutes critics?" The group posted a video in early August 2008 calling for renewed activity in their protest efforts, and planned a subsequent international protest for August 16, 2008. About 35 protesters gathered twice in September 2008 during the first preview and premiere of Arthur Miller's play All My Sons. They encouraged Scientologist Katie Holmes, wife of Tom Cruise, to leave the Church. The most recent international organized protest was held October 18, 2008. Members of Anonymous dressed as zombies, and highlighted what they described as questionable deaths and suicides of Scientologists.

==== December 2008 ====
The film Valkyrie, starring and produced by Tom Cruise, premiered in New York City on December 17. Entertainment reporter Roger Friedman noted that it was held "in the private screening room at the Time Warner Center. Not the Ziegfield [sic] or Loews Lincoln Square, where most premieres are held in public." The venue was chosen in part to minimize the exposure to Scientology protestors gathered at the Time Warner Center. There were also Scientology protests at the European premiere in Berlin, where one protester got his V for Vendetta mask autographed by Tom Cruise. Chanology participants shared the limelight with a person in a bunny suit protesting against the hero worship of Claus von Stauffenberg.

=== 2009 ===
==== January–February 2009 ====
On January 8, 2009, an 18-year-old male member of Anonymous ran into the New York Scientology building shirtless and covered with Vaseline, pubic hair, and toenail clippings. He then proceeded to toss books around and smear the mixture on objects in the building. The man, identified by police as Mahoud Samed Almahadin, was charged with burglary, criminal mischief, and aggravated harassment as hate crimes. Two weeks later, 21-year-old film student and Anonymous member Jacob Speregen was charged with aggravated harassment and criminal mischief as hate crimes after he filmed Almahadin carrying out his prank. According to his mother and the video, Speregen was filming the event from behind the barricade. Scientology critics Mark Bunker and Jason Beghe disagreed with the individual's actions.

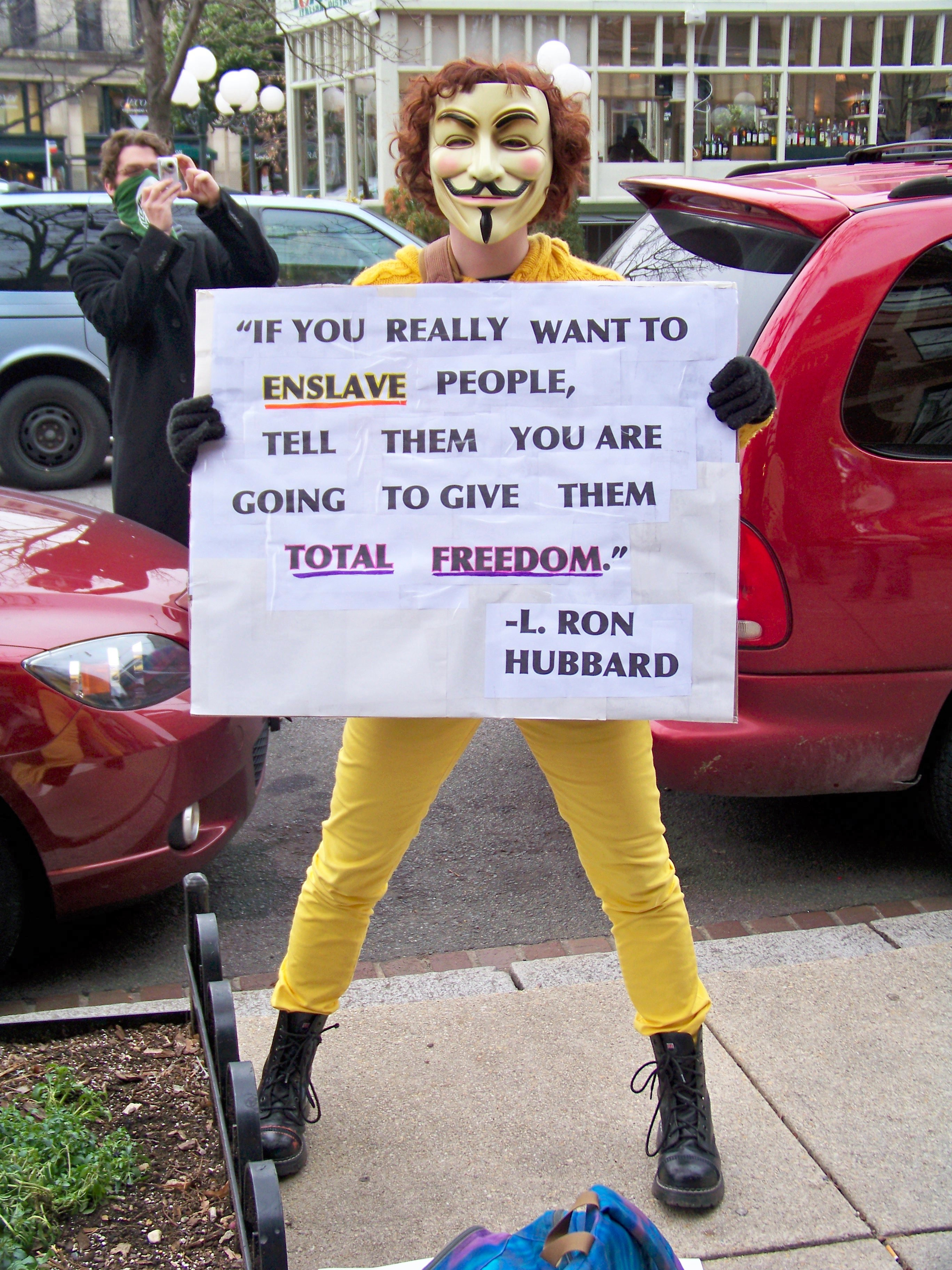
Anonymous protester demonstrating during January 2009 raid outside the Founding Church of Scientology in Washington, D.C.

Anonymous organized a 12th global protest against Scientology for January 10, 2009, to coincide with the Chanology movement's first anniversary. On February 10, 2009, Anonymous released a statement: "Scientology operatives still continue to paint Anonymous in a negative light as a means of distracting attention from Scientology operations and attempting to discredit those who bring truth to the issues at hand. It just isn’t working." The group claimed credit for leaks of internal Scientology documents that appeared on the website WikiLeaks, and announced further global protests for subsequent weekends in February 2009. Members of Anonymous continued to celebrate the one-year anniversary of the Chanology movement during February 2009, with protests held in locations including Hemet, California.

==== March–May 2009 ====
On March 3, 2009, the Board of Supervisors in Riverside County, California, voted to approve an ordinance which restricts residential picketing there to 30 ft (9.1 m) or further from an individual's residence. The ordinance was originally introduced by Supervisor Jeff Stone, board chairman, in November 2008, and went through multiple changes. Critics of the ordinance stated that Stone proposed the measure due to favor for Scientology, which has its Hemet compound located in Riverside County. "The whole ordinance is tainted. The reasons behind it are tainted," said county resident Lirra Bishop. Stone stated the measure was intended for all residents of the county, though he cited protests at Scientology's Gold Base facility which houses residences and Scientology's Golden Era Productions as an example of why the ordinance is needed. Protesters at Gold Base have included members of Anonymous, and Scientology officials claimed they were "threatened with violence". Protesters told the Board of Supervisors that due to the lack of sidewalk near Gold Base, the anti-picketing ordinance would severely hamper the ability to protest outside the Scientology compound.

After stating on October 17, 2008, that he would plead guilty to involvement in the January 2008 DDoS attacks against Church of Scientology websites, an 18-year-old self-described member of Anonymous entered a guilty plea related to hacking charges in May 2009. A release from the US Justice Department said that the individual, a resident of New Jersey, "participated in the attack because he considered himself a member of an underground group called 'Anonymous'". Thom Mrozek, a spokesman for the Justice Department, said that the Church of Scientology had cooperated in the investigation. The individual faced a sentencing scheduled for August 2009.

In May 2009, members of Anonymous told WSMV-TV that they were bullied by off-duty security guards while protesting at a Scientology event in April in Nashville, Tennessee. According to WSMV-TV, a protester stated he was assaulted by three Scientology security guards while on public property, 400 yd (370 m) away from the Scientology building. The Church of Scientology had previously informed the security guards that the protesters were "dangerous people". A protester was issued three citations by the Scientology security guards, but these were all dismissed by the district attorney. On May 8, 2009, WSMV-TV reported that "laws appear to have been broken" in the manner in which the Scientology security guards handled the protesters. The Scientology security guards were not clearly identified as off-duty police officers, and permits for the Scientology event attended by the Anonymous protesters were for the wrong day. "The armed people from the other county are not identified police officers. You're looking for a problem", said John M. L. Brown, a Fraternal Order of Police attorney.

==== November 2009 ====
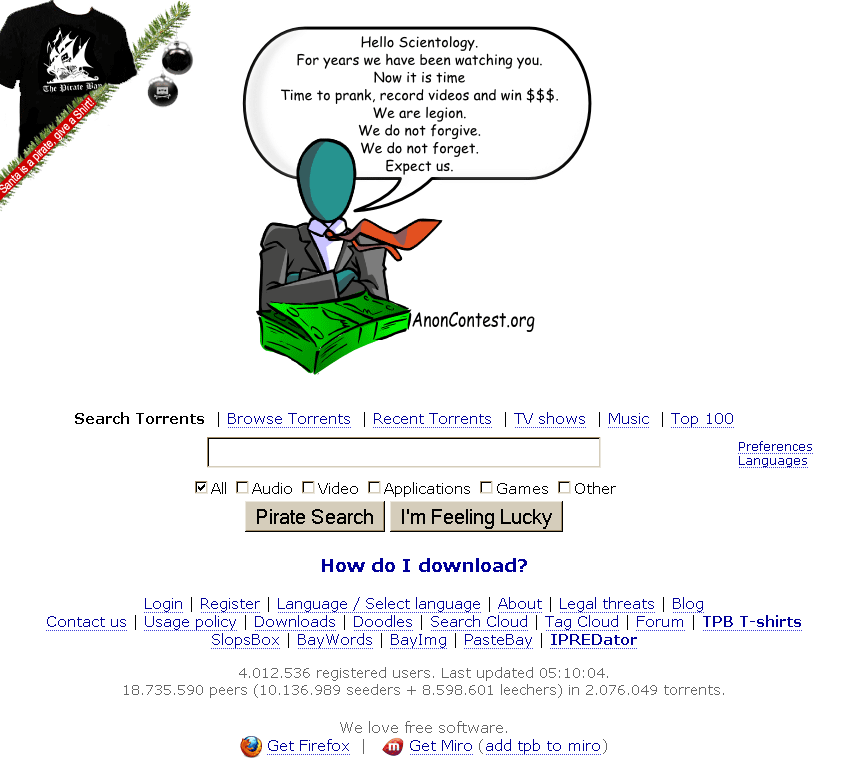
A contest by Project Chanology advertised at The Pirate Bay in December 2009

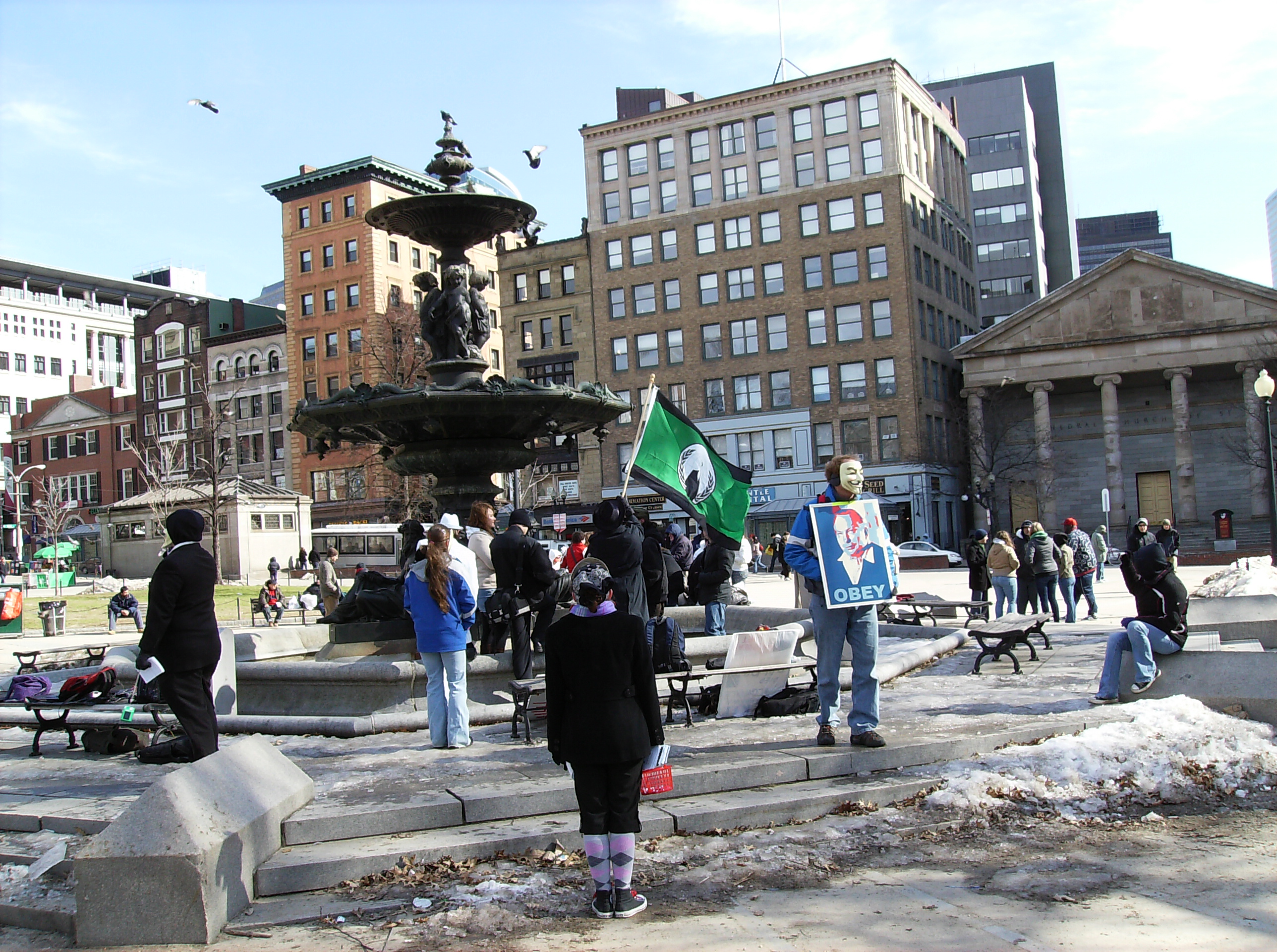
An Anonymous demonstration against Scientology in Boston, Massachusetts, in 2009

On November 13, 2009, Independent Australian Senator Nick Xenophon used parliamentary privilege to accuse the Church of Scientology of being a criminal organization.

=== Campaign against Scientology's tax-exempt status ===
A woman who stated she was a member of Anonymous told KNTV that the group has shifted strategy to activities which fight Scientology but are not deemed illegal by the United States government, including an attempt to get the Internal Revenue Service to investigate the Church of Scientology's 501(c)(3) tax-exempt status. Another woman from Anonymous told Newsweek that the group plans to accomplish this through a lobbying campaign. United States tax authorities removed the Church of Scientology's tax-exemption status in 1967, stating that the organization's auditing techniques served as a for-profit operation for L. Ron Hubbard. In 1984, the United States Tax Court ruled that the Church of Scientology was guilty of "manufacturing and falsifying records to present to the IRS, burglarizing IRS offices and stealing government documents, and subverting government processes for unlawful purposes." The Church of Scientology's tax-exempt status in the United States was reinstated in 1993.

A member of Anonymous calling herself "Envie" told Today Tonight that the group has longer-term plans against the Church of Scientology: "We are incredibly determined ... There are those of us who have been talking about plans for the next 12 to 18 months." A member of Anonymous calling herself "Sarah" spoke with Radar magazine about a letter-writing campaign: "We're sending letters to senators and congresspeople requesting that their tax-exempt status be looked at."

== Church of Scientology response ==
In a January 25, 2008, statement, a spokesman for the Church of Scientology said, "These types of people have got some wrong information about us." In Toronto, a Canadian spokesperson for the Church of Scientology said she didn't "give a damn" if the group Anonymous was responsible for disrupting access to the Scientology site. Church spokeswoman Yvette Shank told Sun Media that she thought the Anonymous members were a "pathetic" group of "computer geeks". On January 26, 2008, CNET News reported that Karin Pouw, public affairs director for the Church of Scientology, did not address their specific request for a comment about the denial-of-service attacks but instead only stated that the Tom Cruise video on YouTube consisted of "pirated and edited" excerpts of Cruise from a 2004 Scientology event.

On January 28, 2008, Radar Online reported that the Church of Scientology asked the U.S. Attorney General's office in Los Angeles, the Federal Bureau of Investigation, and the Los Angeles Police Department to start a criminal investigation of possible criminal activity related to the DDoS attacks. Radar also reported that in statements to law enforcement the Church of Scientology emphasized its status as a religious organization in the United States in order to assert that the DDoS attacks can be classed as hate crimes. The day after the Church of Scientology complained to law enforcement about the DDoS attacks, one of the main Project Chanology sites was down, and a message on the site said that their site crashed due to attacks from Scientologists.

Lee Sheldon of the Church of Scientology of Orlando and Lee Holzinger of the Church of Scientology of Santa Barbara issued similar statements regarding the February 2, 2008 protests in Florida and California, respectively. Both representatives also expressed concerns regarding the spread of "hate speech."

=== Accusations by the Church of Scientology ===
The Church of Scientology released a statement regarding the February 10, 2008 worldwide protests, which was published February 7, 2008 in the St. Petersburg Times. In the statement, the Church of Scientology called the organizers of the protests "cyberterrorists." The statement also referred to the actions of members of Project Chanology as "hate crimes" and "religious bigotry", and in a media release said that the group is guided by Communist Manifesto and Mein Kampf; one of the organizers of the protest responded to the latter allegation by stating: "I don't know where they got that from, but I don't think that's true considering that I am a capitalist and a Jew". Pat Harney, spokeswoman for the Church of Scientology in Clearwater, Florida told the St. Petersburg Times: "We are dealing with a worldwide threat ... This is not a light matter."

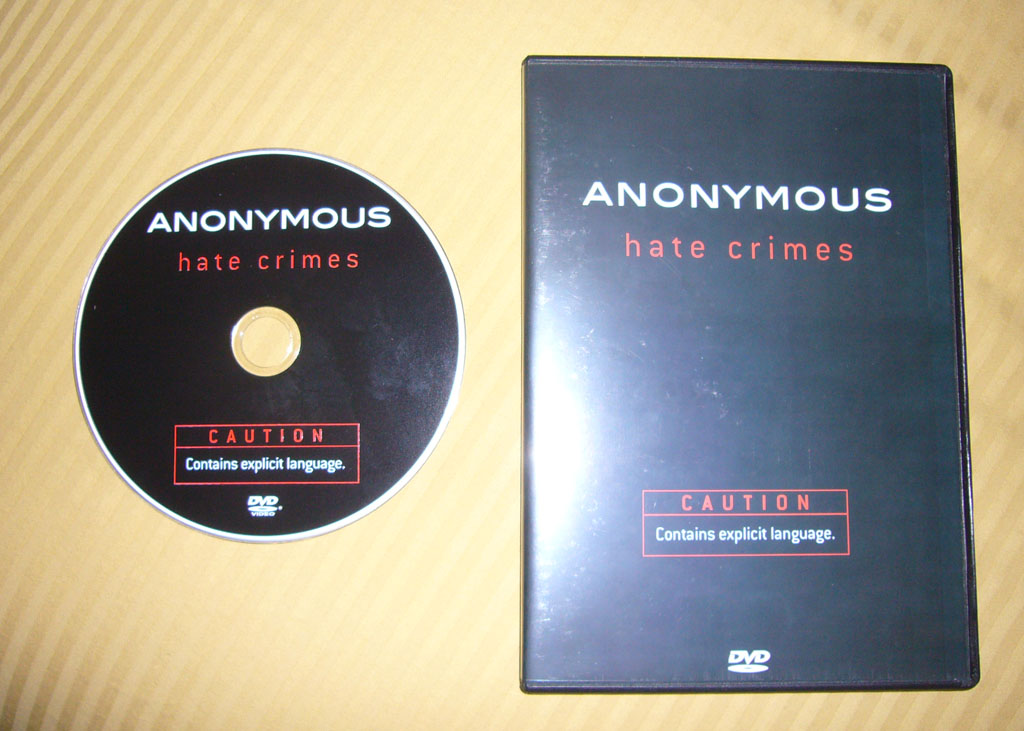
DVD "Anonymous Hate Crimes", created by Scientology

The Church of Scientology posted a YouTube video claiming that Anonymous are "terrorists" and alleging that Anonymous is perpetrating "hate crimes" against the church. The video does not provide any evidence supporting their claims, and the FBI has not named any suspects for several of the threats mentioned. Anonymous has denied involvement in the more severe accusations. The church also released a DVD containing the YouTube video. The DVD called Anonymous a "dangerous" group and accused them of making threats against Scientology. Men claiming to be from the law firm Latham and Watkins delivered the DVD to family members of at least one person who protested.

YouTube user "AnonymousFacts", which Radar Online described as an associate of Scientology, displayed the names and personal information of several supposed Anonymous members and accused the group of violent threats and terrorism. YouTube quickly took the video down and suspended the "AnonymousFacts" account.

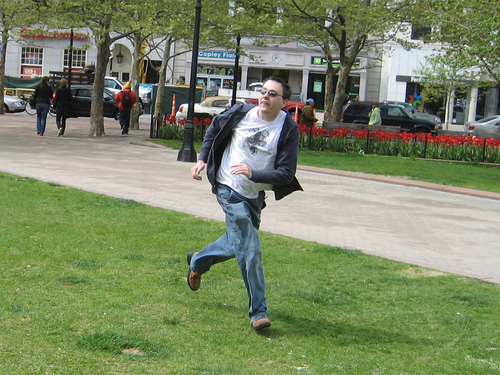
Gregg Housh, against whom the Church filed criminal complaints, at a May 2008 protest

The Church of Scientology sought an injunction and a restraining order to prevent Anonymous from protesting on March 15, 2008, citing threats allegedly made by Anonymous. Both the injunction and the restraining order were denied. On March 31, 2008, Radar Online reported that representatives of law firms delivered legal letters to suspected Anons, often at their homes. The Church filed complaints of trespassing and criminal harassment against Boston organizer Gregg Housh, who was charged with disturbing an assembly of worship, disturbing the peace, and harassment. The District Attorney's office dropped the harassment charge, and Judge Thomas Horgan issued a continuance without finding for the remaining charges.

In a May 8, 2008 appearance on CNN, Church of Scientology spokesman Tommy Davis said that Scientology was "dealing with ninety-six death threats, bomb threats, acts of violence, vandalism" from the group Anonymous. CNN's John Roberts responded, stating that the Federal Bureau of Investigation found nothing connecting Anonymous to the Church of Scientology's accusations of violence: "You are leveling these accusations at this group[;] the F.B.I., which is looking into it, says it has found nothing to connect [the] group 'Anonymous' with what you're talking about, or [with] death threats against members of the church[.] The F.B.I. at this point says [...] it has no reason to believe that charges would be leveled against this group."

== Reaction ==
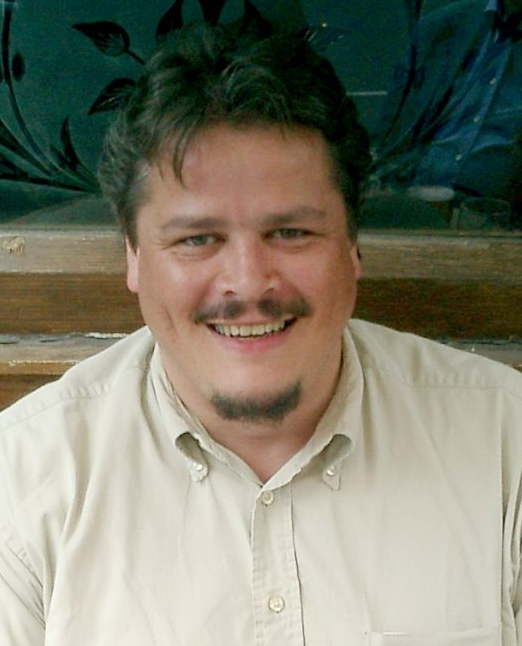
Andreas Heldal-Lund, founder of Operation Clambake

In a YouTube video, Mark Bunker asked Anonymous to stop using destructive tactics. (January 26, 2008)

Andreas Heldal-Lund, founder of the Scientology-critical website and non-profit organization Operation Clambake, released a statement criticizing the digital assault against Scientology. Heldal-Lund commented, "People should be able to have easy access to both sides and make up their own opinions. Freedom of speech means we need to allow all to speak – including those we strongly disagree with. I am of the opinion that the Church of Scientology is a criminal organization and a cult which is designed by its delusional founder to abuse people. I am still committed to fight for their right to speak their opinion." He also stated that "Attacking Scientology like that will just make them play the religious persecution card ... They will use it to defend their own counter actions when they try to shatter criticism and crush critics without mercy."

Mark Bunker, an Emmy Award-winning journalist and Scientology critic who runs the website XenuTV.com, posted a video to YouTube and asked Anonymous to tone down their campaign against the Church of Scientology. According to NPR's Morning Edition, Bunker has "become a revered voice to many members of Anonymous", and they refer to him as "Wise Beard Man". Bunker told Newsweek that he was pleased to see a large group of young individuals acting against Scientology, but stated he was also concerned for their safety: "I know the way Scientology works: they're going to get these people in trouble ... I'm very concerned about their safety, and I'm concerned about the Scientologists' safety, too." Bunker stated that he has received 6,000 emails from individuals who say they are part of Anonymous. Bunker attended the February 10, 2008 protest against Scientology in Los Angeles.

Tory Christman, a critic of Scientology and former Scientologist from 1969 to 2000, stated she disapproved of illegal tactics but felt encouraged by the new influx of critics of Scientology. Christman told Morning Edition: "It feels like we've been out in this desert, fighting this group one-on-one by ourselves, and all of a sudden this huge army came up with not only tons of people, thousands of people, but better tools..." Scientology critic Arnaldo Lerma told the St. Petersburg Times he was impressed by a video of a protest against Scientology which took place in Orlando, Florida: "I've never seen anything like that before. This is incredible. I wouldn't have believed it if I didn't see it on a Web cam."

In a February 4, 2008 appearance on the G4 television program Attack of the Show!, Mark Ebner, journalist and author of the book Hollywood, Interrupted, and Nick Douglas of Gawker.com commented on Project Chanology. Ebner stated that "Hacking their site is not really the best way to go about taking them (the Church of Scientology) down. Most critics you talk to want the Scientology site to be up there so that people who are interested can see the stupidity they have on the web and at the same time they can go – they are a few keystrokes from getting a thousand other opinions." Nick Douglas explained that the group decided to shift their strategy away from the attacks to Scientology websites: "Anonymous even decided that they were going to stop that attack, that it was a bad idea. It's the usual thing they used to do when they really hadn't had a thought out plan, and here they're realizing they actually have to figure out some real plan against a real enemy."

University of Alberta professor Stephen A. Kent weighed in on the issue, and said "I think these disruptions probably are illegal. At the very least, they’re forms of harassment ... We now have three parties involved. Anonymous, Scientology and law enforcement." Kent stated that "The hacker community has been angry at Scientology for [their] attempts to block free speech on the Internet." Reaction to the denial of service attack on the Church of Scientology websites was mixed in message board forums for PC World. Some readers praised the actions of Anonymous, while others commented that the DDoS attacks bring more attention to Scientology. The Economist likened the DDoS attacks used by Project Chanology to "cyberwarfare techniques normally associated with extortionists, spies and terrorists", and referred to Anonymous as "internet activists".

Dan Schultz of PBS's MediaShift Idea Lab commented that the movement "is a really fascinating case study of how current technologies and information dissemination via digital media can snowball into something that actually results in real world action". In a follow-up piece, Schultz discussed the tools used by digital media to achieve community impact, including lower barriers to entry and greater efficiencies through the use of information systems. Schultz wrote "For members of Anonymous I'm betting most of these things are already unspoken understandings", and pointed to their use of memes and cited the forums of the website enturbulation.org as an example of the group's ability to collaborate effectively to accomplish goals.

In a May 8, 2008, report on the recent actions of Anonymous against Scientology, CNN reporter Kareen Wynter commented: "Legal experts say the church may be facing its biggest challenge yet – trying to protect its image, in a loosely policed medium seen by millions of people. In a July 2008 interview with Entertainment Weekly, Alan Moore had this to say about the use of the Guy Fawkes motif, adopted from his comic V for Vendetta: "I was also quite heartened the other day when watching the news to see that there were demonstrations outside the Scientology headquarters over here, and that they suddenly flashed to a clip showing all these demonstrators wearing V for Vendetta [Guy Fawkes] masks. That pleased me. That gave me a warm little glow."

== See also ==
- Hacktivism
- Operation Leakspin
- Operation Payback
- Scientology and the Internet
- Scientology and the legal system
- Scientology controversies
- Streisand effect
