= Mark Bunker =

American Scientology critic and politician

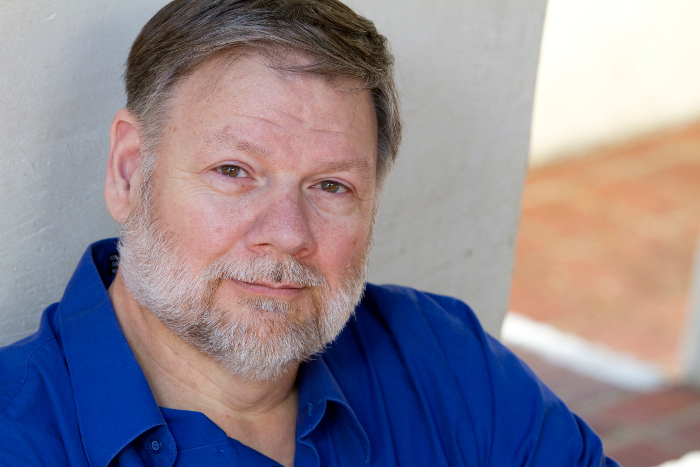
- Portrait of Mark Bunker

The Vice-Mayor of Clearwater 2023-2024

Member of the Clearwater City Council March 2020-March 2024

Personal details
- Born: May 23, 1956 (age 70) Oshkosh, Wisconsin, U.S.
- Occupation: Broadcast journalist, videographer, documentary filmmaker
- Known for: Criticism of Scientology

YouTube information
- Channel: XENU TV
- Genre: Commentary
- Subscribers: 39K
- Views: 11M

Mark Bunker (born May 23, 1956) is an American politician, broadcast journalist, videographer and documentary filmmaker. He won a Regional Emmy Award in 2006 from the Pacific Southwest Emmy Awards division of the National Academy of Television Arts and Sciences. In 2020, Bunker was elected city councilman for Clearwater Florida's 2nd district, and was selected as vice-mayor on April 4, 2023.

He is a critic of the Church of Scientology, having previously worked for Bob Minton and the Lisa McPherson Trust, and is the founder of Xenu TV, a website and YouTube channel featuring videos and commentary critical of Scientology.

== Early career ==
Mark Bunker worked in radio in the Midwest. In the mid-1980s, he then moved to Los Angeles to work as a theater actor and as an actor in television commercials. He also worked for a company doing market research for Hollywood studios, and trained as a video editor with KNBC.

== Broadcast journalism ==
In 2006, Bunker along with KUSI-TV reporter Lena Lewis, won an Emmy Award from the Pacific Southwest Emmy Awards division of the National Academy of Television Arts and Sciences, for a story on border issues in the San Diego, California area.

== Criticism of Scientology ==
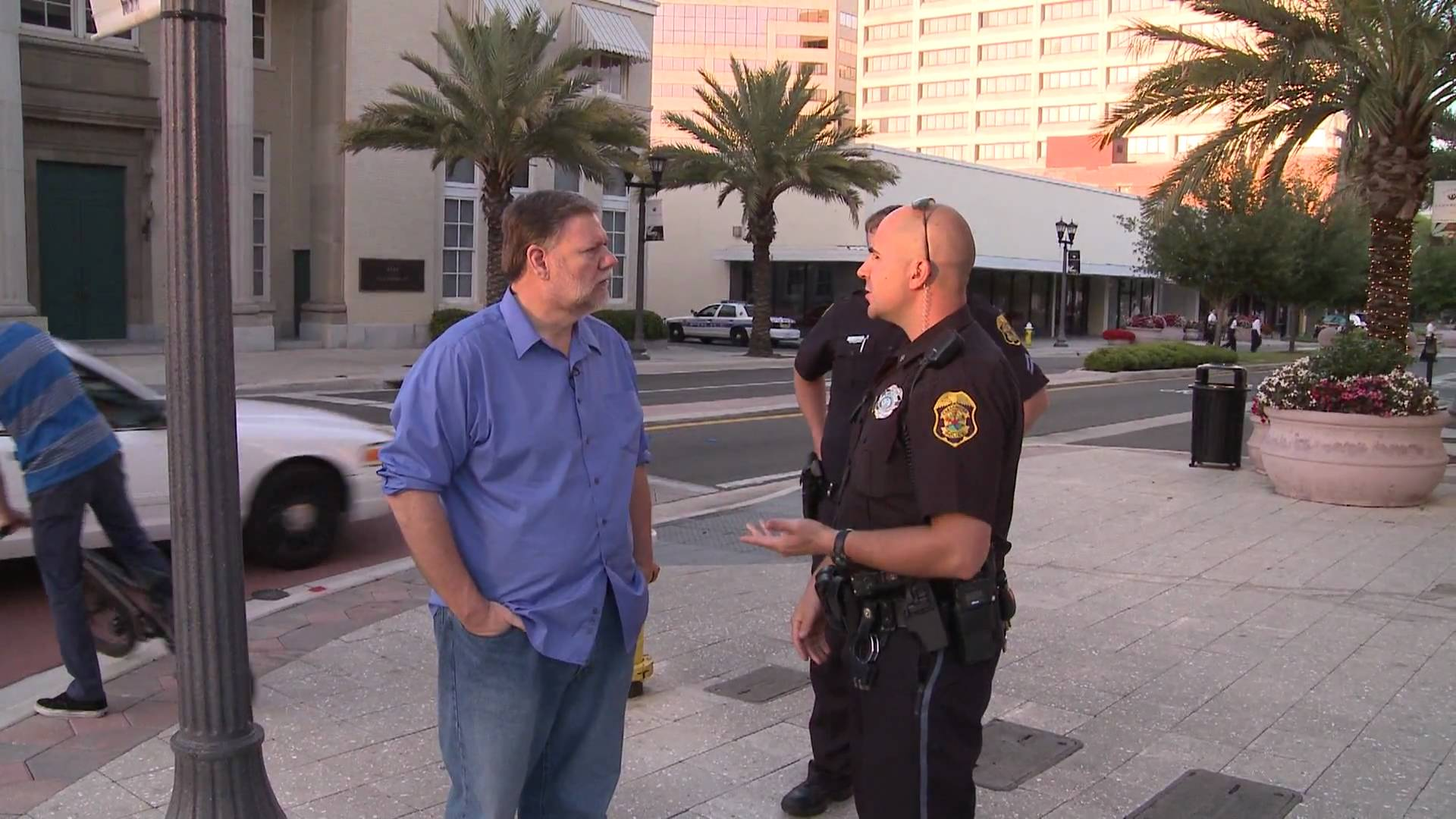
Mark Bunker talking to a police officer in Clearwater, Florida

Bunker started Xenu TV in 1999 and moved to Clearwater, Florida, where he produced videos for the Lisa McPherson trust.

In 2001, Mark Bunker and Jeff Jacobsen, a fellow critic of the Church of Scientology, were refused service by businesses operated by Scientologists in Clearwater. Together they filed discrimination complaints with the Pinellas County Office of Human Rights. The Office of Human Rights rejected their complaints, ruling that the church members had not broken any laws in denying them service. Bunker, Jacobson, and other members of the Lisa McPherson Trust saw this as a sign of the escalating control the Church of Scientology held over the town. Ray Arsenault, a University of South Florida professor and then acting president of the Pinellas chapter of the American Civil Liberties Union, also viewed the denials as acts of discrimination. "It really is a way of trying to bring pressure to stop them from exercising their First Amendment rights."

Since 2010, Bunker has been producing a feature-length independent documentary film entitled Knowledge Report: Scientology's Spies, Lies, and the Eternity Prize concerning the Church of Scientology. According to Bunker, the planned release date is May 2016. This film is being funded by Bunker himself and through crowdfunding.

=== Project Chanology ===
Mark Bunker addresses hacker group Anonymous (January 26, 2008)

In 2008, Bunker posted a video to YouTube critical of the Internet-based group "Anonymous" and asked them to tone down their campaign against the Church of Scientology; a movement called "Project Chanology". In the video "Message to Anonymous", Bunker urged the group to work legally and pursue peaceful ways to protest Scientology.

According to NPR's Morning Edition, Bunker has "become a revered voice to many members of Anonymous", and they refer to him as "Wise Beard Man". Anonymous has adopted a slogan referring to Bunker: "Wise Beard Man. His words are wise, his face is beard." The refrain along with a picture of Bunker has become an Internet meme on the website 4chan.

When actor Jason Beghe decided to leave Scientology in 2008, he contacted Andreas Heldal-Lund, founder of Operation Clambake, who convinced him to meet with Bunker. Heldal-Lund and Bunker went to Beghe's house, where Beghe participated in an interview about his experiences as a Scientologist. Bunker published a 3-minute portion of the 3-hour interview to YouTube in mid-April 2008, and in the video Beghe calls Scientology "very dangerous for your spiritual, psychological, mental, emotional health and evolution". He also comments "I don't have an agenda. I'm just trying to help. I have the luxury of having gotten into Scientology and after having been in it, been out. And that's a perspective that people who are still in and not out do not have."

Clip of Bunker's interview with Jason Beghe (April 14, 2008)

Bunker had posted a 3-minute teaser video about the Beghe interview on his YouTube channel, receiving 595,000 views in just four days. But on April 17, 2008, the day before Bunker had planned on posting the full interview, his YouTube account was taken down due to a DMCA claim for an unrelated video. In an uproar over the loss of the channel, 45 of his over 10,000 subscribers reposted the video clip on their own channels by the following day. Bunker established a Vimeo channel to post the full Beghe interview and by June his YouTube account had been restored after Bunker filed a counter-notification and the original DMCA claimant declined to press charges.

On February 24, 2009, Bunker and another person were cited for trespassing after a citizen's arrest by Church of Scientology's Catherine Fraser. Bunker was part of a group of five demonstrators walking outside the entrance to Scientology's Gold Base in Hemet, California following a meeting earlier in the day of the Riverside County Board of Supervisors where protesters and church members debated a proposed anti-picketing ordinance. Two months later, the district attorney announced charges would not be pursued due to insufficient evidence.

== Clearwater City Council ==
On June 21, 2019, Bunker announced that he would be running for Clearwater City Council in the March 2020 election. Among his campaign issues were demanding accountability and openness from the leaders of the Church of Scientology. His campaign was endorsed by Scientology and the Aftermath hosts Leah Remini and Mike Rinder. On March 17, 2020, Bunker was elected to the Clearwater City Council for a four-year term. When the mayor abruptly resigned, the city council chose Bunker on April 4, 2023 to fill in as vice-mayor until the next election, a position that is rotated amongst the council members. Bunker ran for re-election to the Clearwater City Council, and in March 2024 he lost his council seat to Ryan Cotton.

In 2026, Bunker announced his plans to run again for city council. He filed to run for Seat 5 to succeed Lina Teixeira, who is not seeking reelection.

== Personal life ==
Bunker was born on May 23, 1956, in Oshkosh, Wisconsin.

== Awards ==
Year	Award	Organization	Work	Category	Result
2006	Emmy Award	Pacific Southwest Emmy Awards	Border Special, KUSI	Historic/Cultural - Program Feature/Segment	Won
