= To Have & to Hold (American TV series) =

American drama television series

- Genre: Drama
- Created by: Joanne T. Waters
- Starring: Moira Kelly; Jason Beghe
- Composer: James Raymond
- Country of origin: United States
- Original language: English
- No. of seasons: 1
- No. of episodes: 13 (4 unaired)

Production
- Executive producers: Joanne T. Waters; Bob Greenblatt; David Janollari; Scott Shepard
- Running time: 60 minutes
- Production companies: The Greenblatt/Janollari Studio; Fox Television Studios; CBS Productions

Original release
- Network: CBS
- Release: September 30 – December 9, 1998

To Have & to Hold is an American drama television series created by Joanne T. Waters, that aired on CBS from September 30 to December 9, 1998.

The drama series starred Moira Kelly as Annie Cornell, an attorney, and Jason Beghe as her husband, an Irish-American police officer, Sean McGrail. The series depicted the trials and tribulations of their early married life.

The series had an extensive supporting cast, mostly playing various relatives of Sean's. Appearing in the series were Fionnula Flanagan, Mariette Hartley, Alexa Vega and Rutanya Alda.

The series ran for thirteen episodes, but only airing nine before being cancelled.

== Cast ==
- Moira Kelly as Annie Cornell
- Jason Beghe as Sean McGrail
- Stephen Lee as Patrick McGrail
- Jason Wiles as Michael McGrail
- Stephen Largay as Tommy McGrail
- Fionnula Flanagan as Fiona McGrail
- John Cullum as Robert McGrail
- Colleen Flynn as Carolyn McGrail

== Episodes ==
No.	Title	Directed by	Written by	Original release date
1	"Pilot"	James Hayman	Joanne Waters	September 30, 1998
2	"Whole Lotto Love"	Unknown	Unknown	October 7, 1998
3	"Tangled Up in You"	Unknown	Unknown	October 14, 1998
4	"Hope You Had the Time of Your Wife"	Unknown	Unknown	October 21, 1998
5	"Driveway to Heaven"	Unknown	Unknown	October 28, 1998
6	"These Boots Are Made for Stalking"	Unknown	Unknown	November 4, 1998
7	"Right My Fire"	Unknown	Unknown	November 11, 1998
8	"Turkey Day Blues"	Unknown	Unknown	December 2, 1998
9	"Since I Don't Know You"	Unknown	Unknown	December 9, 1998
10	"The Kids Are All Right?"	TBD	TBD	Unaired
11	"The Least Wonderful Time of the Year"	TBD	TBD	Unaired
12	"Who's Sorry Next?"	TBD	TBD	Unaired
13	"Stuck in the Blizzard with You"	TBD	TBD	Unaired
