= Jason Beghe =

American film and television actor (born 1960)

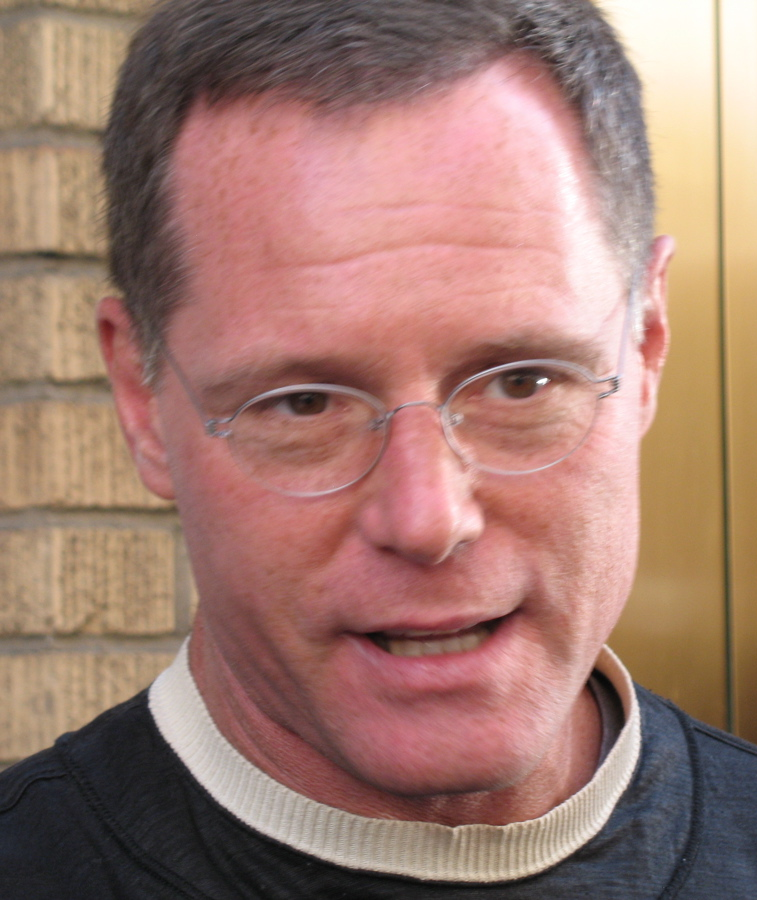
- Beghe in May 2008
- Born: Jason Deneen Beghe; March 12, 1960 (age 66); New York City, U.S.
- Education: Collegiate School; Pomona College
- Occupation: Actor
- Years active: 1985–present
- Known for: Hank Voight in Chicago P.D. Allen Mann in Monkey Shines
- Spouse: Angie Janu (m. 2000; div. 2020)
- Children: 2
- Father: Renato Beghe
- Relatives: Charles S. Deneen (great-grandfather); Bina Deneen (great-grandmother)

Jason Deneen Beghe (/bəˈɡeɪ/; born March 12, 1960) is an American actor and producer. Since 2014, he has starred in the NBC TV series Chicago P.D. as Sergeant Hank Voight. He is also known for starring in the 1988 George A. Romero film Monkey Shines, playing Demi Moore's love interest in G.I. Jane, appearing as a police officer in the film Thelma & Louise, starring opposite Moira Kelly in the television series To Have & to Hold, and having recurring roles on Picket Fences, Melrose Place, Chicago Hope, American Dreams, Cane, and Californication.

Beghe is a former Scientologist. He began taking Scientology courses in 1994 and later appeared in a Church of Scientology advertising campaign and in promotional videos. Beghe left the church in 2007.

== Early life ==
Beghe, who is of Italian, German, English, and French Canadian heritage, was born March 12, 1960, in New York City, the son of tax court judge Renato Beghe, and has three siblings. He attended the Collegiate School, a private preparatory school for boys located in New York City. While there, he became best friends with John F. Kennedy Jr. and actor David Duchovny; another classmate was dancer Christopher d'Amboise. Kennedy and Beghe often spent time together outside the Metropolitan Museum of Art and in Central Park, while being monitored by Kennedy's Secret Service detail. Beghe later persuaded Duchovny to pursue work in acting.

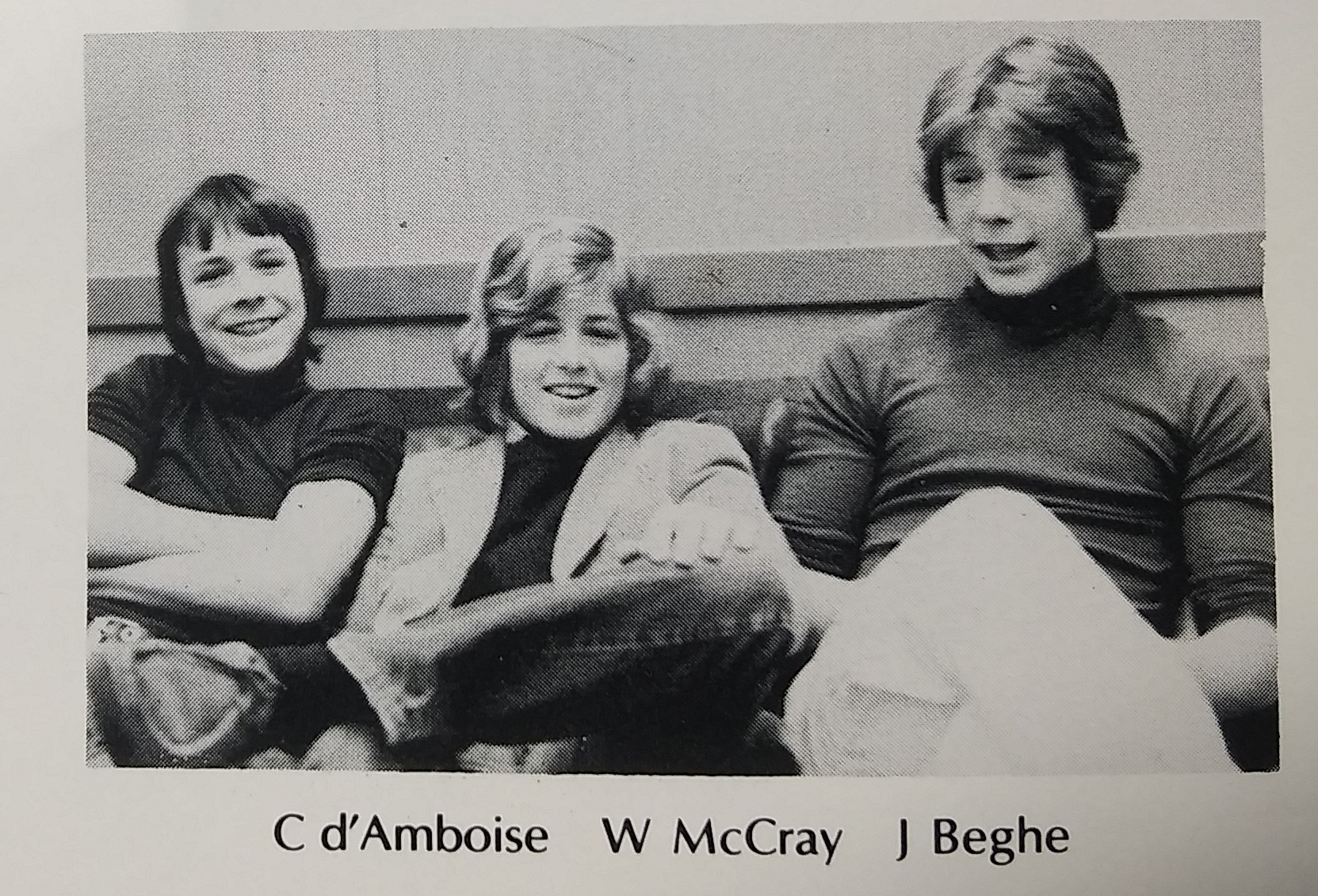
Beghe (right) and Christopher d'Amboise (left) in 8th grade, 1975

He attended Pomona College, graduating in 1982.

== Acting career ==
Prior to his acting career, Beghe worked as a model in Europe. He had his feature film debut in the 1985 film Compromising Positions, starring Susan Sarandon, and in 1986 had his first recurring role on television on the HBO situation comedy series 1st & Ten. He starred alongside O. J. Simpson and Sam J. Jones in HBO's sequel to 1st & Ten titled Training Camp: The Bulls Are Back, and John Voorhees of The Seattle Times wrote: "The cast, which includes O.J. Simpson, Sam Jones and newcomer Jason Beghe, is first-rate."

In 1988, he starred in the film Monkey Shines: An Experiment in Fear, directed by George A. Romero. He portrayed Allan Mann, a law student made quadriplegic when hit by a truck in the opening credits of the film. The Philadelphia Inquirer gave a positive review of Beghe's performance in Monkey Shines: "Acting only with his face and voice, Jason Beghe is terrific at conveying the mounting anger and rage of an active man made passive". David Foil of The Advocate described Beghe's performance as "remarkable simply for meeting the demands of the character".

Beghe played an ice hockey star in the Perry Mason TV film The Case of the All-Star Assassin, an NBC-TV telefeature broadcast November 19, 1989. In 1991, he played a State Trooper in the film Thelma & Louise (reuniting him with Sarandon, with whom he'd appeared in Compromising Positions), and was Demi Moore's love interest in the 1997 film G.I. Jane. He had recurring roles on Picket Fences and Melrose Place, and became a cast member of Chicago Hope in 1997, portraying electrician Danny Blaines opposite romantic interest Dr. Austin played by Christine Lahti. In a 1997 interview in The Boston Herald, Beghe spoke about his respect for his fellow cast members in Chicago Hope: "I think it's the best cast assembled that I've ever seen. One for one, they're incredible. And to work with Christine Lahti? I'd drop a lot of things for that. She's so good and smart and dedicated. I've become a better actor just for working with her." He commented on his character on Melrose Place, a closeted military officer who had feelings for Matt, played by Doug Savant: "I thought we should kiss, but it was too much. TV is a very specific medium, and you're naive if you think that everything is just based on artistic decisions. If it prevents them from selling some products, that's a major consideration. But I'm an actor. I'll do whatever it takes." In 1993, Beghe played Lt. Pat Rudledge in the television drama series Matlock.

Beghe co-starred with Moira Kelly in the 1998 CBS television drama series To Have & to Hold, where he played police officer Sean McGrail. Mike Duffy of the Detroit Free Press wrote: "There is an affectionate romantic sizzle between the ruggedly handsome Beghe and the dark-haired, unconventionally attractive Kelly." Kinney Littlefield of the Orange County Register said that "Beghe and Kelly have charm."

Beghe appeared in acting roles on Numb3rs, CSI: NY, Everwood, Criminal Minds, Veronica Mars, JAG and Cane. Beghe portrayed exorcist Ray Purvis in the 2008 horror film One Missed Call. In 2009, Beghe had a guest-starring role on the television show Californication. He played the character novelist Richard Bates, a friend of character Hank Moody (played by David Duchovny). Beghe's role was made memorable by the fact that he was the first actor to display a mangina on television. "Bates, played by Jason Beghe, made for an interesting character and the fact that he didn't get as much screen time as some of the other characters is a shame," wrote Danny Gallagher of TV Squad. Beghe was in the 2010 film The Next Three Days, directed by Paul Haggis and starring Elizabeth Banks, Russell Crowe, Brian Dennehy, and Olivia Wilde.

Since 2014, Beghe has starred on Chicago P.D.; the show is a spin-off of Chicago Fire, on which Beghe played a recurring role. As of 2022, Beghe has served as an executive producer for the show. Chicago P.D. follows the detectives of the Chicago Police Department's Intelligence Unit that combats the city's major offenses, including organized crime, drug trafficking, and high-profile murders. Beghe plays the role of Sgt. Hank Voight, a "tough cop" who heads the Intelligence Unit.

== Workplace misconduct allegations ==
On November 21, 2017, Deadline Hollywood reported that Beghe was investigated for behavior that was considered overly aggressive while filming Chicago P.D. in 2016. Claims of inappropriate behavior were reportedly made by his former co-star, Sophia Bush. Beghe released a statement in which he acknowledged having anger problems, stated that he was working on them, admitted to engaging in aggressive behavior on set, and apologized.

== Scientology ==
=== Involvement in Scientology ===
In 1994, while taking an acting class taught by Scientologist Milton Katselas, Beghe decided to take some Scientology courses. Fellow acting student Bodhi Elfman gave him a book about Scientology. In 1999, Beghe helped promote a "What is Scientology?" exhibition as part of a Church of Scientology television advertising campaign in the United Kingdom. He appeared in Scientology promotional videos in 2005. Beghe estimated that he gave the Church of Scientology US$1 million over a 12-year period.

In 2007, Beghe decided to leave Scientology. One of the first people he went to see after his departure was his friend David Duchovny. During the years of his involvement in Scientology, his relationship with Duchovny had suffered; Duchovny was referred to as a "Suppressive Person", a term used by Scientologists for those believed to be working against the Church of Scientology.

=== Criticism of Scientology ===
Beghe began to publicly criticize the Church of Scientology in April 2008. He participated in an interview about his experiences as a Scientologist; a clip of that interview was published online by Scientology critic Mark Bunker in mid-April 2008. In the video, Beghe asserted that Scientology was "very dangerous for your spiritual, psychological, mental, emotional health and evolution". The clip ended with Beghe stating, "I don't have an agenda. I'm just trying to help. [...] I have the luxury of having gotten into Scientology and after having been in it, been out. And that's a perspective that people who are still in and not out do not have." Marina Hyde of The Guardian has called Beghe a Scientology celebrity whistleblower.

Clip of Mark Bunker's interview of Beghe (April 14, 2008)

On April 28, 2008, Beghe posted online a letter to Church leader David Miscavige. In the letter, he requested the confidential confessional files that Scientology compiles during Auditing sessions. Beghe told The Village Voice that these confidential files are kept on actor Tom Cruise and other celebrity Scientologists.

Beghe has asserted that Scientology's practice of disconnection was still in place as of 2008. In an interview with Tony Ortega of The Village Voice, Beghe stated that the expulsion of his four-year-old son from a Scientology school was an example of disconnection. Beghe has turned down opportunities to speak about his experiences with Scientology on television; he says, "I just wanted to make sure that the story isn't about me. It's not about me. It's about helping others who are still lost in the cult, or toying with the idea of getting involved."

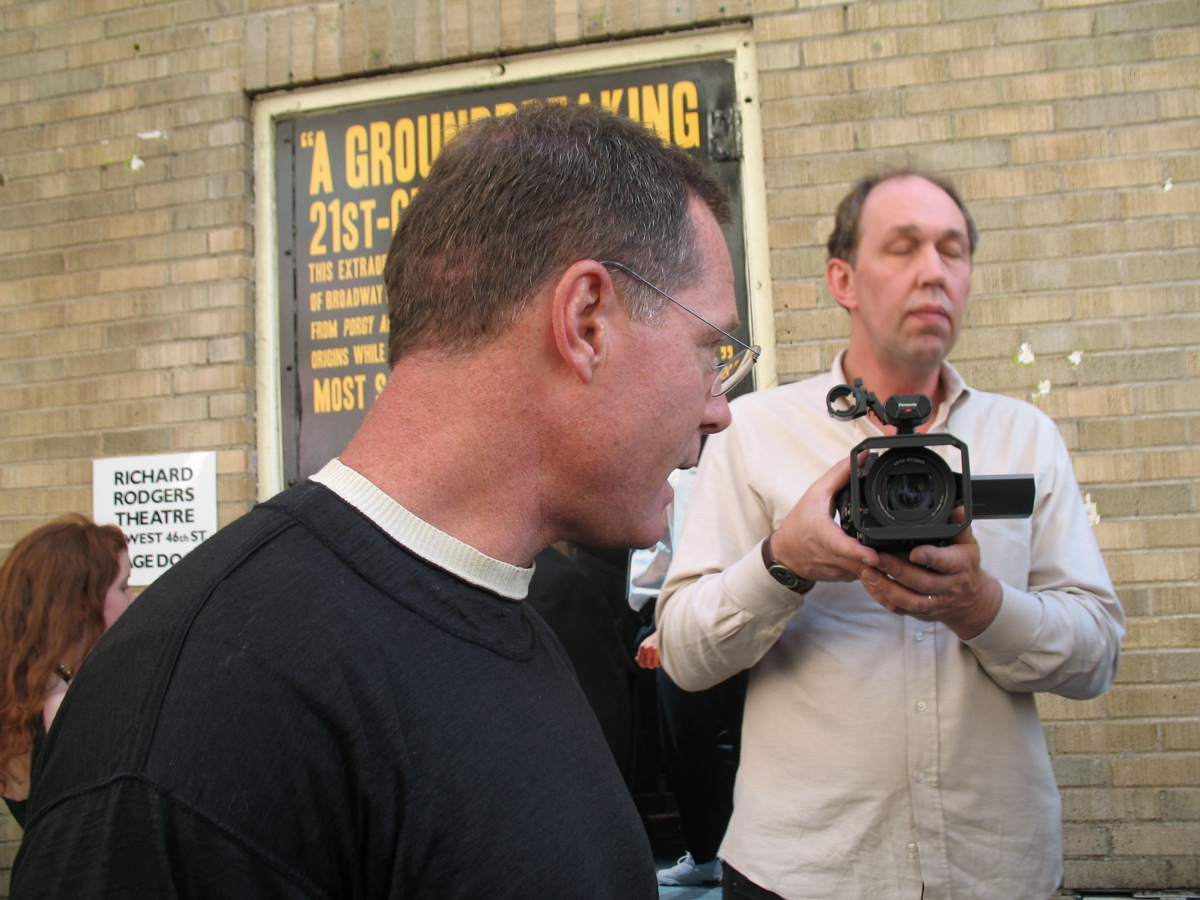
Beghe at a May 29, 2008, protest against Scientology in New York City.

On May 29, 2008, Beghe attended a protest against the Church of Scientology held outside the Scientology building on East 46th Street in New York City. In September 2008, Beghe traveled to Germany where he spoke with government officials in Hamburg, about his experiences as a Scientologist. Beghe suggested that governments put up warning signs about Scientology that are similar to warnings placed on packs of cigarettes; the next day, a member of Germany's Interior Department told him such a sign was placed outside a Church of Scientology building in Berlin.

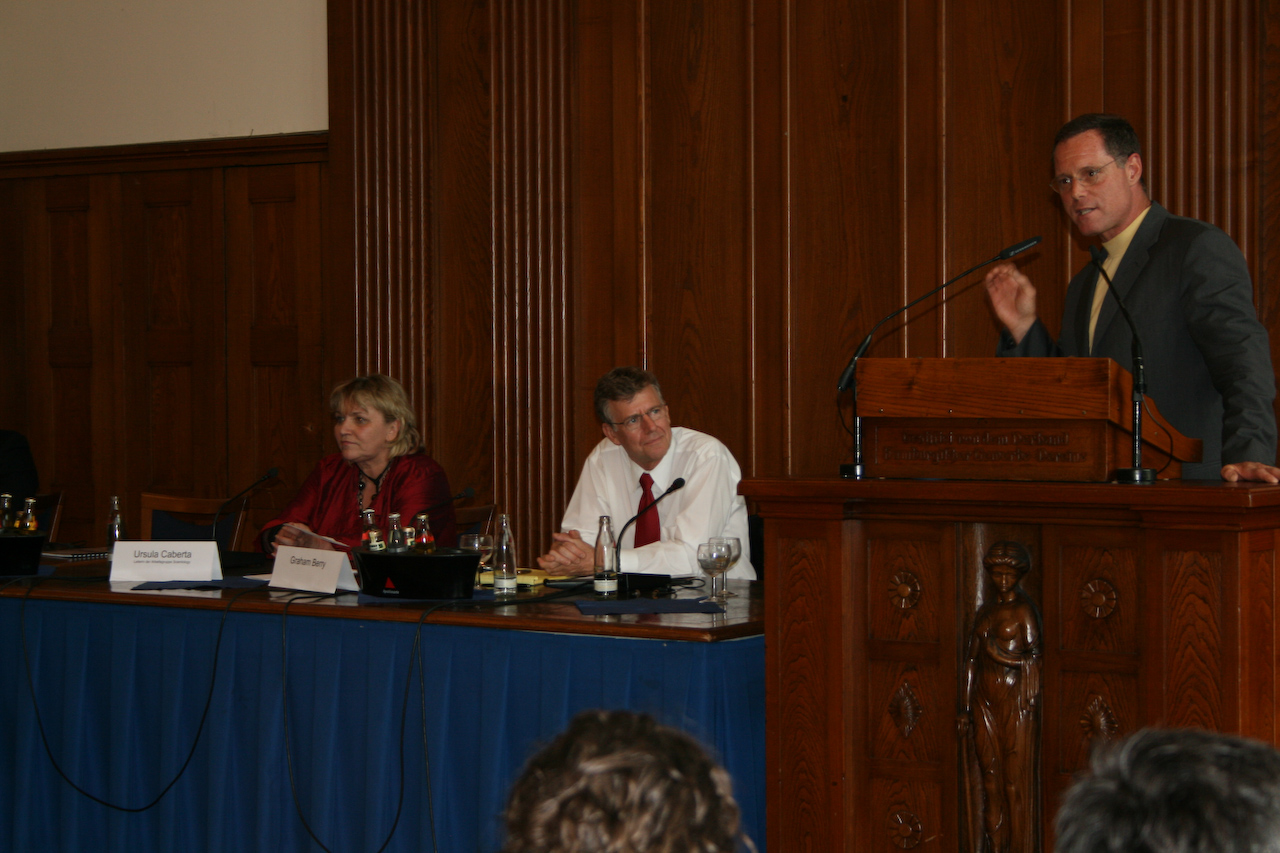
Beghe speaking at a conference on Scientology in Hamburg, Germany (September 4, 2008)

Beghe was a guest in May 2009 on the BBC World Service radio program World: Have Your Say, where he discussed his views on what he thought of Scientology when he first joined: "I thought that it was something that was going to deliver miracles, and that it was the most selfless group of people that were totally dedicated to helping mankind, and I wanted to be part of it." He was also critical of Scientology leadership: "I think that there are probably things of Scientology that are valuable and that can help people – my main issue is not with Scientology per se, it is with Scientology the organization – it is a corrupt I believe and probably a criminal endeavor, and that has to do with people who are in charge of Scientology mainly David Miscavige..."

In September 2010, Beghe took part in a BBC News Panorama documentary, The Secrets of Scientology, in which he spoke about his decision to leave the organization. Beghe also appeared in the 2015 HBO documentary Going Clear, based upon the book of the same name by Lawrence Wright.

== Personal life ==
Beghe's sister, Francesca Beghe, is a singer-songwriter who released a self-titled album in 1991 with SBK Records. His great-grandfather was Charles S. Deneen, a two-term governor of Illinois and one-term U.S. Senator in the late 1920s.

Beghe and David Duchovny are close friends; he was best man at Duchovny's wedding to actress Téa Leoni in 1997.

Beghe is known for his signature "gravelly" voice owing to a car accident in 1999. He said, "I was intubated, and I kept pulling this tube out of my throat."

Beghe married Angie Janu in 2000. The couple have two sons. He lives in Nichols Canyon, Los Angeles, California. In December 2017, Beghe filed for divorce, which was granted in September 2020.

== Filmography ==
=== Film ===
Year	Film	Role	Notes
1985	Compromising Positions	Cupcake	Feature film debut
1987	Maid to Order	Bret	
1988	Monkey Shines	Allan Mann	
1991	Thelma & Louise	State Trooper	
1994	Jimmy Hollywood	Detective	
1997	G.I. Jane	Royce	
1998	The X-Files	FBI Man at Bomb Site	Uncredited
2002	Home Alone 4	Peter McCallister	
2008	One Missed Call	Ray Purvis	
2010	The Next Three Days	Detective Quinn	
2010	Tall Justice	Moretti	
2011	X-Men: First Class	XO	
2012	Atlas Shrugged: Part II	Henry Rearden	
2013	Superman: Unbound	Terrorist Leader	Voice
2013	Phantom	Dr. Semak	
2015	Safelight	Eric	
2018	Dawgtown	Mauler	Voice

=== Television ===
Year	Title	Role	Notes
1986	Dress Gray	Hank Beaumont	TV mini-series, 2 episodes
1986–1987	1st & Ten	Tom Yinessa	First recurring role on television 23 episodes
1987	The Days and Nights of Molly Dodd	Glen	Episode: "Here's Why Henry David Thoreau Chose the Pond"
1989	Alien Nation	Dr. Jim Trenner	Episode: "Fountain of Youth"
1989	Perry Mason: The Case of the All-Star Assassin	Bobby Spencer	Television film
1989	Christine Cromwell	Billy Peale	Episode: "Easy Come, Easy Go"
1989	Man Against the Mob: The Chinatown Murders	Sammy Turner	Television film
1989–1990	Murder, She Wrote	Wayne Bennett/Steve Chambers	2 episodes
1990	The Operation	John Kopiak	Television film
1990	Mancuso, FBI	Charles Faxon	Episode: "Daryl Ross & the Supremes"
1990	Quantum Leap	Det. Sgt. Roger Skaggs	Episode: "M.I.A."
1990	Johnny Ryan	Peter Howard	Television film
1991	Jake and the Fatman	Dennis Morgan	2 episodes
1992	Homefront	Paul	Episode: "Bad Connection"
1992	Intruders	Ray Brooks	2 episodes
1992–1993	Picket Fences	A.D.A. Petrovic	5 episodes
1993	In the Heat of the Night	Mark Meyers	Episode: "Private Sessions"
1993	L.A. Law	Detective Greg Riley	Episode: "Cold Shower"
1993	Full Eclipse	Doug Crane	Television film
1993–1995	Matlock	Thomas Crighton/Lt. Pat Rutledge	2 episodes
1994	Treasure Island: The Adventure Begins	Robbie	Television film
1994	The X-Files	Larry Moore	Episode: "Darkness Falls"
1994	Melrose Place	Lt. Jeffrey Lindley	8 episodes
1995	Courthouse	Russell Snow	Episode: "Order on the Court"
1995	NYPD Blue	Julian Kerbis	Episode: "One Big Happy Family"
1996	Public Morals	Boyfriend	Episode: "The Yellow Cover"
1996	Good Company	Ron Nash	6 episodes
1996	Suddenly	Joe Mulvey	Television film
1997	Promised Land	Jeff	Episode: "Independence Day"
1997	George and Leo	Ron	2 episodes
1997–1998	Chicago Hope	Danny Blaines	4 episodes
1998	Baby Monitor: Sound of Fear	Matt	Television film
1998	Cab to Canada	Mike Donahue	Television film
1998	To Have & to Hold	Sean McGrail	13 episodes
1999–2000	Family Law	Don	4 episodes
2000	Runaway Virus	Daniel Rothman	Television film
2000	Dharma & Greg	Scott Kelley	Episode: "The Spy Who Said He Loved Me"
2000	Resurrection Blvd.	Eric Carter	2 episodes
2000	When Andrew Came Home	Eddie	Television film
2001	The Beast	Bill Hanson	Episode: "The Damage Done"
2001	Kristin	Peter Medavoy	Episode: "The Rival"
2001	Three Blind Mice	Carter Simmons	Television film
2002	CSI: Crime Scene Investigation	Russ Bradley	Episode: "Burden of Proof"
2002	Judging Amy	Tim Powell	Episode: "Lost and Found"
2003	The District	Donnelly/Officer Terry	2 episodes
2003	The Lyon's Den	FBI Agent Vince Ryan	Episode: "Ex"
2004	Pilot Season	Henry R. Duke	Television miniseries
2004	JAG	Sgt. Maj. Thomas Elgart Ret.	Episode: "Corporate Raiders"
2004	American Dreams	Gunnery Sergeant Finch	11 episodes
2004–2005	Everwood	John Hayes	6 episodes
2005	The Inside	Special Agent Randall Day	Episode: "Gem"
2006	Huff	Darren Hadlick	2 episodes
2006	CSI: NY	Jack Butler	Episode: "Stealing Home"
2006	Veronica Mars	Cormac Fitzpatrick	2 episodes
2006	Criminal Minds	Sheriff Yates	Episode: "North Mammon"
2007	Numb3rs	Reid Sarasin	Episode: "Finders Keepers"
2007	Cane	Vince Grasso	8 episodes
2008	Ghost Whisperer	Kevin Keller	Episode: "Bloodline"
2008	Eli Stone	Rick O'Malley	Episode: "The Humanitarian"
2008	Runaway		Episode: "Father Figure"
2009	Life	John Flowers	Episode: "3 Women"
2009	Lie to Me	Captain Hoopes	Episode: "Undercover"
2009–2013	Californication	Richard Bates	13 episodes
2010	Hawthorne	Richard Maxwell	Episode: "Hidden Truths"
2010	Tall Justice	Moretti	Short
2010	Medium	Frank Davenport	Episode: "Smoke Damage"
2010–2011	Castle	Mike Royce	2 episodes
2011	Big Tweet	Jimmy Rossi	Short
2011	Needs	Head Mobster	Short
2011	NCIS	Blake Martin	Episode: "Kill Screen"
2011	Law & Order: Los Angeles	Raymond Garson	Episode: "Silver Lake"
2011	Prime Suspect	Detective Jake Keating	Episode: "Pilot"
2011	Henry	Will	Short
2012–present	Chicago Fire	Det./Sgt. Hank Voight	Recurring role, 20 episodes
2012	Body of Proof	Harvey Brand	Episode: "Occupational Hazards"
2012	The Finder	Col. Chuck Bradshaw	Episode: "Little Green Men"
2012	Last Resort	Wes	2 episodes
2013	Phantom	Dr. Semak	
2013	Dice City	Detective Branson	Television film
2014	Wild Card	Donatello	Episode: "The Pilot"
2014–present	Chicago P.D.	Sergeant Hank Voight	Lead role: 161 episodes Also serves as executive producer as of season 10
2014–2016	Law & Order: Special Victims Unit	Sergeant Hank Voight	Guest: 3 episodes
2015	BoJack Horseman	Jogger	2 episodes
2015–present	Chicago Med	Sergeant Hank Voight	Recurring role
2017	Chicago Justice	Sergeant Hank Voight	3 episodes
