= Ryan Singel =

American tech blogger and journalist

Ryan Singel is a San Francisco-based blogger and journalist covering tech business, tech policy, civil liberty and privacy issues. His work has appeared extensively in Wired.com, and Singel co-founded the Threat Level blog with journalist and convicted hacker Kevin Lee Poulsen. As of 2008, he began covering tech business news for "Wired.com"'s Epicenter blog.

Singel has covered issues of government monitoring, and has been a chronicler of AT&T's alleged involvement in the NSA warrantless surveillance controversy. Involvement by Wired News in the case has been criticized by federal authorities.

Singel also founded a copy editing company called The Universal Desk in 2009.

In 2012, Singel left his job at Wired to run the startup called Contextly, an engagement platform for publishers.
