= Comic Perversion =

- Law & Order: Special Victims Unit episode
- Episode no.: Season 15; Episode 15
- Directed by: Alex Chapple
- Teleplay by: Brianna Yellen
- Original air date: February 26, 2014

Guest appearances
- Skyler Day as Renee Clark; Dean Winters as Brian Cassidy; Sophia Bush as Erin Lindsay; Jonathan Silverman as Josh Galloway; Laura Slade Wiggins as Carly Rydell

Episode chronology
← Previous "Wednesday's Child"	Next → "Gridiron Soldier"
- Law & Order: Special Victims Unit season 15

"Comic Perversion" is the fifteenth episode of the fifteenth season of the American police procedural-legal drama Law & Order: Special Victims Unit. The episode aired on February 26, 2014, on NBC. In the episode, a comedian, who makes jokes about gang rape to his audiences, is put on trial after it emerges that he has raped a young woman. Towards the end of the episode, Chicago P.D. character Erin Lindsay visits the Manhattan Special Victims Unit to obtain information regarding rapes that are occurring in Chicago. This episode continued in the Chicago P.D. episode "Conventions".

== Synopsis ==
The episode begins with university students watching a comedian (Jonathan Silverman) doing his gig in a comedy club. The comedian starts joking about rape. When the comedian humiliates Renee Clark (Skyler Day, who reprises her role from the episode "Girl Dishonored") who is protesting against him, two boys attempted to sexually assault her but she manages to escape. Renee reports the crime to Olivia Benson (Mariska Hargitay) who then investigates. The comedian, Josh Galloway, ends up inviting the SVU detectives to his next gig and he verbally abuses them during the gig. When the comedian starts talking about the sex he had with a student, she then reports him to Olivia. Amanda Rollins and Nick Amaro (Kelli Giddish and Danny Pino) learn that there was a previous victim who isn't willing to come forward. When Rafael Barba (Raul Esparza) puts Galloway on trial, Galloway uses the trial as material. In frustration that Galloway may end up walking out a free man, Renee (despite Benson's advise not to do it) plans to prove Galloway's pathology by impersonating a former acquaintance (using his lack of facial recollection of her as an advantage) and manages to record him trying to sexually assault her after she refuses his advances. Later on, upon the introduction of the new evidence, Galloway eventually takes a plea deal of ten years on the sex offenders registry. As Olivia is finishing her work, Chicago detective Erin Lindsay (Sophia Bush) walks in looking for a file on a rapist, Erin is surprised when Olivia passes on the kind words Hank Voight (Jason Beghe) said about her.

== Production ==
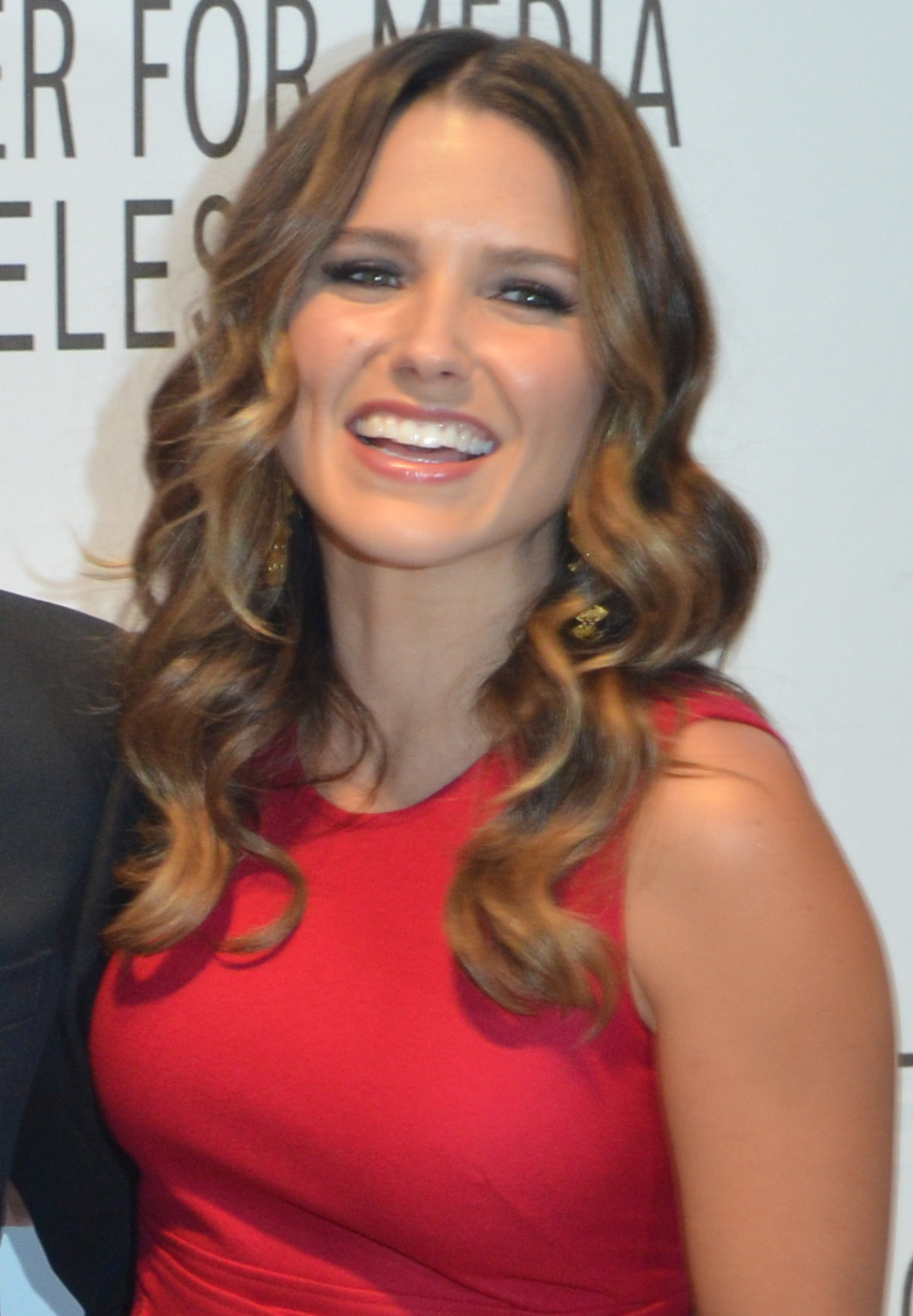
Sophia Bush appears in this episode as Erin Lindsay

It was announced that Chicago P.D. star Sophia Bush was going to appear as her character Erin Lindsay. It was said, "Sophia Bush, who plays Det. Erin Lindsay on the new NBC drama, is traveling to New York this coming week to shoot a scene for Law & Order: SVU with star Mariska Hargitay." The Comic's Comic wrote about Silverman's casting, "Jonathan Silverman plays Josh Galloway, a stand-up comedian who makes a name for himself with rape jokes and a crime for himself in alleged rapes in tonight's episode, "Comic Perversions."" It was posted on Skyler Day's website "Skyler is bringing her character "Renee Clark" back to Law & Order: SVU on February 26 at 9/8c on NBC." Executive Producer, Warren Leight said in an interview with Eclipse Magazine that the episode was based on comedian Dane Cook. Leight said "I'd say, you know, this – we were aware last year there were – there's a spate of comics getting a lot of attention for rape-jokes. And obviously there was the Tosh incident, was I think one of the more public and egregious incidents in which he decided wouldn't it be funny if he – someone was heckling him and he got into it with her. And said wouldn't it be funny if you were – if these guys gang raped you right here? And, you know, at SVU we don't think that's funny. And then there was Dane Cook had certain jokes."

== Reception ==
The episode received 7.78 million viewers. The Pop Break wrote "Oh, SVU why did you have to do this? After weeks of steady improvement (particularly from the show's terrible mid-season premiere) the series took a massive, massive step backwards with "Comic Perversion."" Erin Whitney of Screen Crush rated this episode 352 out of 399 Law & Order: Special Victims Unit episodes. She wrote about the episode "The best part is an Ice-T line. When Rollins says, "He's bating you, Liv," Fin replies, "Masturbating!" A reviewer for Geektastic Podcast wrote "In summation, this Law & Order: SVU was a lot like rape, in that I hope nobody ever has to experience it ever again."
