= April 2014 Chicago crossover event =

Television crossover event

- Chicago crossover event
- Hank Voight (Jason Beghe) and Wallace Boden (Eamonn Walker) discussing the facts of the bombing.
- Story by: Dick Wolf; Matt Olmstead
- Teleplay by: Michael Brandt; Derek Haas

Part 1: Chicago Fire
- Episode title: "A Dark Day"
- Episode no.: Season 2 Episode 20
- Directed by: Joe Chappelle
- Original air date: April 29, 2014

Episode chronology
← Previous "A Heavy Weight"	Next → "One More Shot"
- Chicago Fire season 2

Part 2: Chicago P.D.
- Episode title: "8:30 PM"
- Episode no.: Season 1 Episode 12
- Directed by: Mark Tinker
- Original air date: April 30, 2014

Episode chronology
← Previous "Turn the Light Off"	Next → "My Way"
- Chicago P.D. season 1

Crossover chronology
- Preceded by: February 2014 Chicago and Law & Order: SVU crossover event
- Followed by: November 2014 Chicago and Law & Order: SVU crossover event

The April 2014 Chicago crossover event is a two-part fictional crossover that exists within the Chicago franchise. The event aired on NBC in two one-hour timeslots on consecutive weeknights. It began with "A Dark Day" of Chicago Fire on April 29, 2014, and concluded with "8:30 PM" of Chicago P.D. on April 30, 2014. Both episodes followed a unified storyline of a bombing at Chicago Medical Center and the search and rescue of survivors as well as the investigation of those responsible. Dick Wolf and Matt Olmstead wrote the story for both parts while Michael Brandt and Derek Haas wrote the teleplay. The story was inspired by the Oklahoma City bombing and Boston Marathon bombing. The first part of the crossover event received mostly mixed reviews while the second part received more positive reviews.

== Plot ==
=== Part 1: "A Dark Day" ===
Boden informs Hermann that Hermann will be acting lieutenant on Truck 81 for the day because Casey and Gabby are volunteering for a charity race event at Chicago Medical. Hermann initially says he needs more time to prepare but agrees. Casey and Gabby run into Burgess, who is watching her niece; the two are sharing tent space and Casey and Gabby help Burgess set up. Gabby then heads inside to go get registered for the race. Shortly after, a car bomb detonates outside the hospital. Casey immediately begins helping survivors outside the hospital. Gabby is missing. Firehouse 51 and others from the Chicago Fire Department arrive and begin search and rescue. Boden sends Cruz and Mills to look for a secondary bomb. Shay heads inside with Dr. Holly Whelan, a pediatrics doctor, to look for more injured, accidentally injuring herself on rebar. Doctors begin treating Burgess's niece, who sustained a crushed liver and is bleeding internally as a result of the explosion. Mills finds a secondary car bomb in a parking structure adjacent to the hospital. Casey and Severide head into a confined space of rubble in search of Gabby. Boden meets Mills and Cruz and find that the second bomb is set to detonate at 8:30 PM, but Mills successfully defuses it. Rafferty, Shay, and Whelan are asked to tag additional patients as more survivors are found. Burgess's niece is rushed into surgery and needs a liver transplant. Gabby regains consciousness and is able to alert Casey and Severide to her position. Whelan's sister, who initially seemed to only have a minor concussion, has a seizure and is diagnosed with a subdural hematoma; as a result she is also rushed into surgery. The doctor finds a liver that was initially planned for a Syrian ambassador to the United States and prepares for the transplant but the organ was damaged in the explosion. Casey and Severide find Gabby and the rest of the team begins to dig her out. Atwater arrives to console a distraught Burgess. Voight, Lindsay, Antonio, and Halstead of the Chicago Police Department's intelligence unit as well as Illinois State Police, Federal Bureau of Investigation, Department of Homeland Security, Bureau of Alcohol, Tobacco, Firearms and Explosives, and the Central Intelligence Agency arrive to begin investigating the bombing. Shay collapses in the hospital as a result of her injuries.

=== Part 2: "8:30 PM" ===
Whelan immediately comes to Shay's aid. Boden updates the intelligence unit on the situation. Voight and Antonio, along with other departments receive a briefing from the FBI agent leading the investigation. Jin is shown to the secondary car bomb to analyze it while the rest of intelligence including Ruzek, Olinsky, and Sumner begin interviewing witnesses. Jin pulls a print off of the second bomb and acquires a no-knock warrant to search the suspect's apartment. Whelan recommends to her parents that her sister be taken off life support. Intelligence raids the suspect's apartment only to find the suspect murdered. Shay wakes up and begins to recover. Jin finds that one of the suspect's known associates is receiving treatment in the hospital. Intelligence attempts to intercept him but the situation escalates when he holds Lindsay hostage at knifepoint; the scene is quickly diffused by Mills. The associate gives Voight the name Ted Powell; Voight recognizes Ted as a person acting suspiciously outside the hospital earlier. Intelligence finds that the first bomb was intended to detonate at 8:00 PM during a CPD and CFD gala while the second bomb was set to target the first responders, but that the timer on the first bomb was wrongly set to 8:00 AM. Sumner finds that Ted's father Frank Powell had previously been arrested after a two-day standoff in which Ted's mother/Frank's wife was killed in the crossfire. Antonio attempts to strike a deal with Frank to flip on Ted but Frank refuses. A doctor approaches Whelan's parents about donating the liver of their daughter, who has been declared brain-dead, to Burgess's niece. Intelligence searches a warehouse belonging to another of Ted's associates and finds that three timing devices had been purchased. They think of other high-value targets where a third bomb would do the most damage, ultimately settling on police headquarters. Olinsky spots Ted on the roof of a building adjacent police headquarters and Lindsay and Halstead go after him, but he takes a hostage and runs. The bomb squad arrives with eight and a half minutes until the bomb is set to go off; they successfully defuse it. Intelligence engages in a shootout with Ted but ultimately take him into custody after Voight personally wounds him for endangering his city. Burgess's niece makes a successful recovery following the liver transplant. Severide shows up at Lindsay's apartment unexpectedly and the two get intimate.

== Cast and characters ==
=== Main ===
Actor	Character	Episode	
Actor	Character	Chicago Fire	Chicago P.D.
Jesse Spencer	Matthew Casey	Main	Guest
Taylor Kinney	Kelly Severide	Main	Guest
Monica Raymund	Gabriella Dawson	Main	
Lauren German	Leslie Shay	Main	Guest
Charlie Barnett	Peter Mills	Main	Guest
David Eigenberg	Christopher Hermann	Main	
Yuri Sardarov	Brian "Otis" Zvonecek	Main	
Joe Minoso	Joe Cruz	Main	Guest
Christian Stolte	Randall "Mouch" McHolland	Main	
Eamonn Walker	Wallace Boden	Main	Guest
Jason Beghe	Hank Voight	Guest	Main
Jon Seda	Antonio Dawson	Guest	Main
Sophia Bush	Erin Lindsay	Guest	Main
Jesse Lee Soffer	Jay Halstead	Guest	Main
Patrick John Flueger	Adam Ruzek		Main
Marina Squerciati	Kim Burgess	Guest	Main
LaRoyce Hawkins	Kevin Atwater	Guest	Main
Archie Kao	Sheldon Jin		Main
Elias Koteas	Alvin Olinsky		Main

=== Notable guests ===
Actor	Character	Episode	
Actor	Character	Chicago Fire	Chicago P.D.
Amanda Righetti	Holly Whelan	Guest	Guest
Avi Lake	Imogene	Guest	Guest
Aimee Laurence	Zoey Silver	Guest	Guest
Randy Flagler	Harold Capp	Guest	Guest
Dylan Baker	David Arata	Guest	Guest
Erik Hellman	Alec Whillhite	Guest	Guest
Christine Evangelista	Allison Rafferty	Guest	
Francis Guinan	Fire commissioner	Guest	
Sydney Tamiia Poitier	Mia Sumner		Guest
Jay Karnes	William Graff		Guest

== Production ==
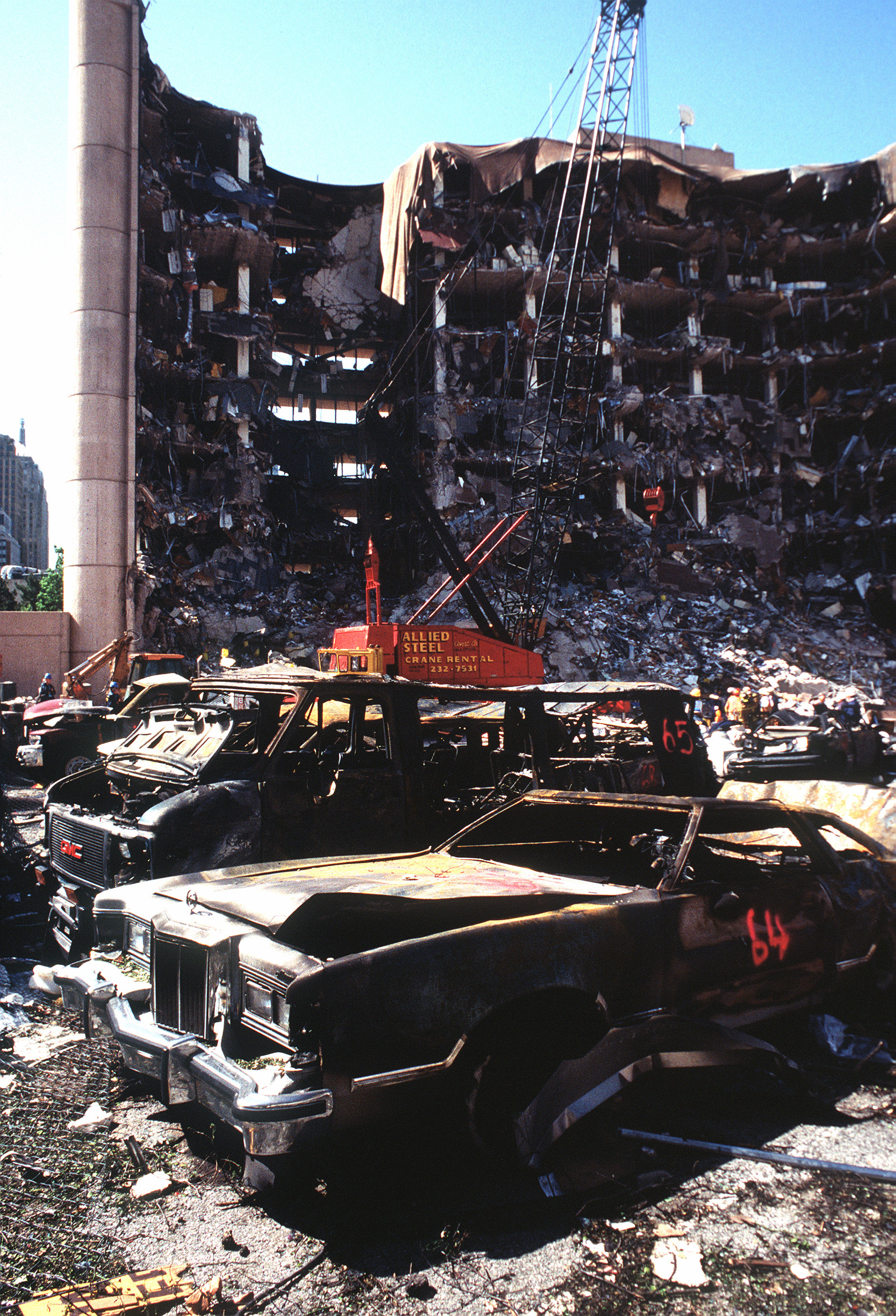
Writer Dick Wolf stated the 1995 Oklahoma City Bombing at the Alfred P. Murrah Federal Building are served as inspirations for the story.

Executive producer, Dick Wolf who co-wrote the story for both parts, stated that his inspiration for the crossover came from the Oklahoma City Bombing and Boston Marathon Bombings. The Fire episode was filmed late February 2014, while the P.D. episode filmed in early March 2014; filming took place around Chicago, Illinois including at the former Sears tower in Homan Square and at Cinespace Film Studios Chicago. Wolf stated "As our country has gone through tragedies like that one, it's the first responders who always set the tone and who always begin to put us back together, and I want to really examine that now that we've got these two shows with the fire fighters and the police." In a promotional interview with P.D. star Sophia Bush speaking about the emotion behind-the-scenes of the event said "We always expect things to happen in war, far away, and then when they happen in your backyard, what does that mean?" Sydney Tamiia Poitier guest starred in the P.D. episode as Mia Sumner after being cast in a five-episode story arc.

== Reception ==
=== Viewing figures ===
The Fire episode was watched live by 7.06 million viewers while viewers for the P.D. episode the following day rose to 7.28 million. Within seven days, by means of video on demand streaming and other methods, viewership on the first part raised to 10.52 million while the second part rose to 10.90 million. Internationally, in Canada, the first part was viewed by 1.73 million and the second part was viewed by 1.40 million with both series ranking in the top thirty viewed programs for the week at sixteen and twenty-one respectively.

=== Critical response ===
When reviewing "A Dark Day," Lisa Casas with Screen Spy, said the explosion is the type of things seen in feature films not small screen television but later stated "'A Dark Day' was supposed to get things rolling, but instead disappointed. All the potential from that initial explosion just went black, deteriorating into a bunch of jumbled story lines, too many for us to care about all of them." Casas also reviewed the second part and called the episode the best of the season so far noting that the P.D. episode was far better than the Fire episode saying that Fire had too many storylines and too large of a cast while P.D. focused on two central storylines with a smaller cast. Matt Carter with CarterMatt reviewed both parts of the crossover stating that the Fire episode was something normally seen in a season finale and that it was terrible and triumphant at the same time. Carter then stated that the P.D. episode fixed a disaster that didn't seem like it could be fixed.
