= Chicago Fire season 4 =

Chicago Fire
- Season 4
- Chicago Fire Season 4 DVD cover
- Showrunners: Matt Olmstead; Michael Brandt; Derek Haas
- No. of episodes: 23

Release
- Original network: NBC
- Original release: October 13, 2015 – May 17, 2016

Season chronology
- ← Previous; Season 3 Next → Season 5

The fourth season of Chicago Fire, an American drama television series with executive producer Dick Wolf, and producers Derek Haas, Michael Brandt, and Matt Olmstead, was ordered on February 5, 2015, by NBC, and premiered on October 13, 2015, and concluded on May 17, 2016. The season contained 23 episodes.

== Overview ==
The show follows the lives of the firefighters and paramedics working at the Chicago Fire Department at the firehouse of Engine 51, Truck 81, Squad 3, Ambulance 61 and Battalion 25.

== Cast and characters ==
=== Main cast ===
- Jesse Spencer as Lieutenant Matthew Casey, Truck 81
- Taylor Kinney as Firefighter/Lieutenant Kelly Severide, Squad 3
- Monica Raymund as Firefighter Gabriela Dawson, Truck 81
- Kara Killmer as Paramedic/Paramedic in Charge Sylvie Brett, Ambulance 61
- David Eigenberg as Firefighter Christopher Herrmann, Truck 81
- Yuri Sardarov as Firefighter Brian "Otis" Zvonecek, Truck 81
- Joe Minoso as Firefighter Joe Cruz, Squad 3
- Christian Stolte as Firefighter Randy "Mouch" McHolland, Truck 81
- Dora Madison as Paramedic in Charge/Paramedic Jessica "Chili" Chilton, Ambulance 61 (Episodes 1-14)
- Steven R. McQueen as Firefighter Candidate/Paramedic Jimmy Borelli, Truck 81/ Ambulance 61
- Eamonn Walker as Chief Wallace Boden, Battalion 25

=== Recurring ===
- The Cohen Twins (Aiden and Austin Cohen) as Louie
- Randy Flagler as Firefighter Harold Capp, Rescue Squad 3
- Anthony Ferraris as Firefighter Tony Ferraris, Rescue Squad 3
- DuShon Brown as Connie
- Brian J. White as Captain/Battalion Chief Dallas Patterson, Rescue Squad 3/Firehouse 51/Firehouse 90
- Miranda Rae Mayo as Firefighter Stella Kidd, Truck 81
- Melissa Ponzio as Donna Robbins-Boden
- Robyn Coffin as Cindy Herrmann
- Brandon Jay McLaren as Danny Booker
- Jenny Mollen as Detective Bianca Holloway
- Holly Robinson Peete as Tamara Jones
- Lauren Stamile as Susan Weller
- Guy Burnet as Grant Smith
- Gordon Clapp as Chaplain Orlovsky
- Liza J. Bennett as Agent Alex Ward
- Deanna Reed-Foster as Tina Cantrell, Department of Children and Family Services
- Rachel Nichols as Jamie Killian
- Fredric Lehne as Deputy District Chief Ray Riddle
- Tom Amandes as Detective Ryan Wheeler
- Ilfenesh Hadera as Serena Holmes
- Mark Hengst as Roger Maddox
- Ralph Rodriguez as Freddie Clemente
- Susannah Flood as Athena Bailey-Johnson
- Andy Ahrens as Firefighter Danny Borelli, Engine 67
- Eric Mabius as Jack Nesbitt

=== Guest ===
- Treat Williams as Benjamin "Benny" Severide (episode 7)

=== Crossover characters ===
- Nick Gehlfuss as Dr. Will Halstead
- Jason Beghe as Sergeant Henry "Hank" Voight
- Jon Seda as Detective Antonio Dawson
- Oliver Platt as Dr. Daniel Charles
- Yaya DaCosta as April Sexton
- Patrick John Flueger as Officer Adam Ruzek
- LaRoyce Hawkins as Officer Kevin Atwater
- Marina Squerciati as Officer Kim Burgess
- Amy Morton as Desk Sergeant Trudy Platt
- Brian Geraghty as Officer Sean Roman
- Elias Koteas as Detective Alvin Olinsky
- Colin Donnell as Dr. Connor Rhodes
- Rachel DiPillo as Sarah Reese
- Brian Tee as Dr. Ethan Choi
- Marlyne Barrett as Maggie Lockwood
- Samuel Hunt as Greg "Mouse" Gerwitz
- Barbara Eve Harris as Deputy Chief Emma Crowley
- Chris Agos as Assistant State's Attorney Steve Kot
- Armand Schultz as Alderman Colin Becks

== Episodes ==
No. overall	No. in season	Title	Directed by	Written by	Original release date	Prod. code	U.S. viewers (millions)
70	1	"Let It Burn"	Joe Chappelle	Andrea Newman & Michael Gilvary	October 13, 2015	401	7.37
Casey is placed in a dangerous situation while working undercover to bring down a trafficking ring being run out of Nesbitt's club. The squad's high turnover rate results in an unwelcome surprise for Severide. In other events, Dawson recognizes that her life is about to change; a new candidate makes an unusual first impression; and residents band together to protest a drug den in their neighborhood.
71	2	"A Taste of Panama City"	Sanford Bookstaver	Tiller Russell	October 20, 2015	402	7.64
Following her pregnancy announcement, Dawson takes a desk job to investigate fires. Severide struggles with his new role, and Casey continues his investigation into Nesbitt. Molly's is threatened with closure following a noise complaint from new neighbors.
72	3	"I Walk Away"	Tom DiCillo	Sarah Kucserka & Veronica West	October 27, 2015	403	7.80
51 receives a call in the same troubled neighborhood. A man with a crushed leg leads to his wife giving Boden evidence of the previous incident that could clear Boden's name. Candidate Jimmy Borrelli's (guest star Steven R. McQueen) brother meddles in trying to get him moved into a different house. Dawson looks into an arson investigation that puts Boden in hot water. Brett gets attached to a victim of a previous call. Dawson suddenly suffers from abdominal pain and collapses.
73	4	"Your Day Is Coming"	Reza Tabrizi	Jill Weinberger	November 3, 2015	404	8.11
Dawson is rushed into emergency surgery following her collapse. In honor of Dawson, Severide and Boden seek to help close her arson case. Molly's receives a notice of closure following a code violation. Dawson loses the baby leaving her and Matt devastated. Borrelli seeks the help from his cousin who works in construction to help get Molly's back open. Severide, with the help of Patterson, investigates how the OFI files got deleted. Ambo 61 responds to a call at the county morgue. It turns out that Duffy had the files; he jumps off a bridge holding a weight and Kelly goes in after him.
74	5	"Regarding This Wedding"	Joe Chappelle	Michael A. O'Shea	November 10, 2015	405	8.15
51 receives a call to a fire at a house where a wedding was about to take place but the groom is rushed to the hospital trying to save his bride. Later, Dawson, Brett, and Chili have an idea to host the wedding at the firehouse, which Chief Boden at first doesn't agree with. Meanwhile, Dawson is cleared to return to work as a firefighter, but Riddle tells her he doesn't want her to. Also, Boden's leadership is questioned by Riddle. Severide and Patterson fight both inside and outside the Firehouse, leaving everyone worried about Severide's future at 51.
75	6	"2112"	Holly Dale	Ian McCulloch	November 17, 2015	406	7.95
Tensions only get worse between Patterson and Severide when Severide makes a call at a job without his consent causing Patterson to question Severide's future at 51. Borelli and Chili take their romance to the next level; Cruz receives a visit from one of his brother Leon's old gang members. Mouch receives tickets from one of the members of the rock band Rush and Boden and his wife Donna welcome a new neighbor who turns out to be overly friendly.: Guest appearances by Rush members Alex Lifeson and Geddy Lee, and NASCAR driver Carl Edwards
76	7	"Sharp Elbows"	Dan Lerner	Tiller Russell & Liz Alper & Ally Seibert	November 24, 2015	407	7.34
Boden could face criminal assault charges following an incident with his neighbor which leads to Voight helping out. Meanwhile, tensions continue with Captain Patterson which leads to Severide's father obtaining information that could bring Patterson down. Chili and Borelli continue their romance; Otis asks out Brett to the Chicago Fire Department gala; and Cruz helps out an old friend.
77	8	"When Tortoises Fly"	Haze Bergeron	Michael Gilvary	December 1, 2015	408	8.62
Boden's situation goes from bad to worse after Donna confronts their neighbor who is later reported missing. Detective Wheeler searches his home. A state attorney stops by 51 to see Boden about the Maddox case. This conversation puts Boden on to the possibility that Maddox is the one setting him up which is later confirmed when Boden confronts him. During a call, Hermann rescues a tortoise that he believed was a "robot". Mouch takes a liking to the animal and they find out it belongs to a John Doe to whom Chili and Brett had been called. Another call has Truck and Squad dealing with a Peeping Tom trapped in the ventilation system at a local gym. He tries to escape from the roof, but is tackled by Severide. Chili is late to shift and given "strike one" by Boden. Jimmy later finds Chili's apartment in disarray and she appears to be intoxicated. When he asks her what is going on, she avoids the issue by seducing him. After shift at Molly's, the crew relax until Wheeler shows up and officially arrests Boden.
78	9	"Short and Fat"	Joe Chappelle	Michael Brandt & Derek Haas	December 8, 2015	409	9.13
Following Boden's arrest, Patterson is promoted to chief of Firehouse 51 much to everyone's dismay. Later on, Patterson sets new rules for the house that makes everyone uncomfortable, especially Chili and Borelli. Meanwhile, Severide continues to help strengthen Boden's case. Also, Dawson receives heat at a previous call when she gets into an outburst with a citizen and the outburst is recorded. Finding the woman who set Boden up, police get her to turn against the builder hoping to ruin the chief and Boden is exonerated. Patterson sees the light, especially after seeing 51's crew disarm a dangerous situation involving a hydrogen tank leak, and willingly restores command of 51 to Boden. He also tells off the meddlesome District Chief Riddle. During a celebratory party at Molly's, Hermann gets stabbed.
79	10	"The Beating Heart"	Reza Tabrizi	Andrea Newman	January 5, 2016	410	7.43
Hermann is rushed to Chicago Med after being stabbed at Molly's by the young gangbanger he tried to rescue from that life. After losing a lot of blood, it is determined he needs emergency surgery. Feeling guilty about Hermann's present state, Cruz searches for Freddy to turn him in. Severide is reinstated as Lieutenant while Borelli grows more concerned about Chili's erratic behavior. Mouch considers finally proposing to Platt. This episode begins a crossover with Chicago Med and Chicago P.D. that continues on "Malignant" and concludes on "Now I'm God". It is included on the Chicago Med Season 1 and Chicago P.D. Season 3 DVD sets.
80	11	"The Path of Destruction"	Drucilla Carlson	Sarah Kucserka & Veronica West	January 19, 2016	411	8.16
The city of Chicago prepares for a dangerous tornado. Meanwhile, Hermann returns to 51 after his health scare, but his wife thinks it is too early for him to return. Chili's erratic behavior continues, and she calls out Borelli and almost kills a victim while at a call. Later on, the tornado hits a Chicago neighborhood. It is Hermann's neighborhood and concern grows for his family's safety. Also, Dawson helps Otis on how to find a date.
81	12	"Not Everyone Makes It"	Reza Tabrizi	Tiller Russell	January 26, 2016	412	8.46
Brett turns to Boden for Chili's erratic behavior which could cost her job. Meanwhile, Hermann testifies against Freddy about his near fatal stabbing. Also, Casey helps out at the homeless shelter following the tornado devastation. Severide helps out an agent with a homicide case.
82	13	"The Sky Is Falling"	Joe Chappelle	Michael Brandt & Michael A. O'Shea	February 2, 2016	413	8.18
Chili's erratic behavior reaches another level when she asks Chief Boden to transfer Brett to another house after Brett discovers that Chili's behavior affected her in another house. Meanwhile Firehouse 51 prepares for a terrorist threat in Chicago. Chili reveals the root of her drinking problem: her grief over her missing sister's overdose death. Elsewhere, Hermann signs Borelli up for a charity boxing match with the police and Casey investigates the missing money from the fundraiser that was supposed to help the citizens from the tornado.
83	14	"All Hard Parts"	Sanford Bookstaver	Jill Weinberger	February 9, 2016	414	8.13
Severide confronts Chili about her erratic behavior and drinking problem which leads to Boden forcing her out of 51. Meanwhile, Borelli and Antonio battle it out in the boxing ring. Casey considers running for alderman. Note: Last appearance of Jessica "Chili" Chilton (Dora Madison)
84	15	"Bad For the Soul"	Jann Turner	Andrea Newman & Michael Gilvary	February 16, 2016	415	7.53
Severide and Cruz investigate a call at a firehouse that might not be an accident. Meanwhile, following Chili's termination, Borelli is reassigned to ambulance 61 after a union rule pushes him out. Casey officially runs for alderman and asks everyone at 51 for their help. A new firefighter, Stella Kidd (Miranda Rae Mayo) is introduced as the new member of Truck 81. Note: First appearance of Stella Kidd (Miranda Rae Mayo)
85	16	"Two Ts"	Reza Tabrizi	Derek Haas & Ian McCulloch	February 23, 2016	416	7.80
Casey's run for alderman takes a bad turn when billboards about his personal life go up. Meanwhile, Brett and Borelli investigate a possible kidnapping case with the help of Officer Sean Roman and Nurse Maggie Lockwood. Also, the guys at 51 try to throw Mouch a bachelor party, but Trudy's half brother takes charge of it. It is revealed that Severide and Kidd had an awkward past.
86	17	"What Happened to Courtney"	Jeffrey Hunt	Story by : Matt Olmstead; Teleplay by : Liz Alper & Ally Seibert	March 29, 2016	417	8.66
A decomposed body is found stuck in a chimney and Severide suspects that it might be a missing child. Meanwhile, Casey's campaign hits a minor snag when his opponent criticizes him for wanting to be both a fireman and an alderman at the same time, and Dawson throws a party for Casey at Molly's.
87	18	"On the Warpath"	Joe Chappelle	Sarah Kucserka & Veronica West	April 5, 2016	418	7.68
Brett gets mugged and her identity stolen while at a call. Meanwhile, Casey has his first week as elected Alderman, Mouch begins to get cold feet when his wedding nears. Also, Otis begins to regret not asking Brett out.
88	19	"I Will Be Walking"	Sanford Bookstaver	Tiller Russell	April 19, 2016	419	8.17
Casey deals with Alderman issues relating to a boy taking the heat for his brother's gang activities. Kidd and Hermann have a Bar Olympics to see who is the better bar manager. Also, Otis has bad bruising on his back and hip and goes to Dr. Halstead to get it checked out. Also, Severide deals with Detective Holloway's son who she keeps dropping off at the house, despite his apparent disinterest in fire fighters. Later, The house responds to a distillery fire. Also, Jimmy has an awkward situation with a patient.
89	20	"The Last One for Mom"	Fred Berner	Story by : Matt Olmstead; Teleplay by : Gwen Sigan	April 26, 2016	420	8.22
Severide is forced into a difficult situation when he watches Detective Holloway's son while his mother is shot and killed. Meanwhile, Casey receives a bribe in the mail and immediately turns it into the police but then later faces the Board of Ethics. Also, Brett finds out that Otis doesn't want to know his diagnosis and Cruz feels guilty at a call.
90	21	"Kind of a Crazy Idea"	Joe Chappelle	Andrea Newman & Michael Gilvary	May 3, 2016	421	7.79
Dawson begins to get attached to a foster child after saving him after a last call. Meanwhile, Severide looks into upgrades for Firehouse 51, but is hitting walls and asks Casey for his political help. Also, Brett and Cruz bring in Otis' grandmother in order to convince him to go to the hospital fearing the worst and Kidd pitches ideas for Molly's.
91	22	"Where the Collapse Started"	Sanford Bookstaver	Sarah Kucserka & Veronica West	May 10, 2016	422	7.98
Boden makes a life or death call at a building collapse scene when Jimmy returns to rescue his brother. Later, Members of 51 and other first responders salute Jimmy's brother. Meanwhile, Dawson continues to pursue fostering Louie. While on medical leave, Otis meets his temporary replacement fearing that it might be permanent. Also, Casey and Antonio butt heads when he finds out that Casey is not helping Dawson out.
92	23	"Superhero"	Michael Brandt	Story by : Ian McCulloch & Michael A. O'Shea; Teleplay by : Michael Brandt & Derek Haas	May 17, 2016	423	7.91
Borelli deals with the fallout of the death of his brother Danny and takes it out on Boden. Meanwhile, Dawson is forced to find an apartment so she can foster Louie, Kidd continues to deal with her ex-husband. Also, Casey travels to an Alderman conference and Otis returns to 51. At the end of the episode, Severide and Kidd return to her apartment, but do not notice that Kidd's ex-husband is hiding there with a knife.

== Ratings ==
Viewership and ratings per episode of Chicago Fire season 4
No.	Title	Air date	Rating/share (18–49)	Viewers (millions)	Total (18–49)	Total viewers (millions)
1	"Let It Burn"	October 13, 2015	1.8/6	7.37	2.9	10.80
2	"A Taste of Panama City"	October 20, 2015	1.6/5	7.64	2.9	11.44
3	"I Walk Away"	October 27, 2015	1.9/6	7.80	3.1	11.71
4	"Your Day Is Coming"	November 3, 2015	1.8/6	8.11	2.9	11.76
5	"Regarding This Wedding"	November 10, 2015	2.0/7	8.15	2.8	11.73
6	"2112"	November 17, 2015	1.9/6	7.95	3.0	11.44
7	"Sharp Elbows"	November 24, 2015	1.8/6	7.34	2.9	11.05
8	"When Tortoises Fly"	December 1, 2015	1.9/6	8.62	2.9	11.89
9	"Short and Fat"	December 8, 2015	2.0/7	9.13	3.1	12.63
10	"The Beating Heart"	January 5, 2016	1.8/6	7.43	2.9	11.22
11	"The Path of Destruction"	January 19, 2016	1.8/6	8.16	2.9	11.91
12	"Not Everyone Makes It"	January 26, 2016	1.8/6	8.46	2.8	11.80
13	"The Sky Is Falling"	February 2, 2016	1.8/6	8.18	2.9	11.88
14	"All Hard Parts"	February 9, 2016	1.8/6	8.13	2.8	11.52
15	"Bad For the Soul"	February 16, 2016	1.6/5	7.53	2.6	11.17
16	"Two T's"	February 23, 2016	1.6/5	7.80	2.7	11.41
17	"What Happened to Courtney"	March 29, 2016	1.7/6	8.66	2.8	12.27
18	"On the Warpath"	April 5, 2016	1.5/5	7.68	2.6	11.47
19	"I Will Be Walking"	April 19, 2016	1.7/6	8.17	2.7	11.79
20	"The Last One for Mom"	April 26, 2016	1.7/6	8.22	2.7	11.63
21	"Kind of a Crazy Idea"	May 3, 2016	1.6/5	7.79	2.6	11.18
22	"Where the Collapse Started"	May 10, 2016	1.6/6	7.98	2.6	11.52
23	"Superhero"	May 17, 2016	1.7/6	7.91	2.7	11.51

== Home media ==
The DVD release of season four was released in Region 1 on August 30, 2016.

The Complete Four Season
Set details			Special features
23 episodes; 966 minutes (Region 1); 6-disc set; 1.78:1 aspect ratio; Languages: English (Dolby Digital 5.1); Spanish (Dolby Digital 5.1); Subtitles: English (Region 1); Spanish (Region 1)			Behind the Scenes; Chicago Med Season 1 Crossover Episode – "Malignant"; Chicago P.D. Season 3 Crossover Episode – "Now I'm God"
Release dates			Behind the Scenes; Chicago Med Season 1 Crossover Episode – "Malignant"; Chicago P.D. Season 3 Crossover Episode – "Now I'm God"
United States	United Kingdom	Australia	Behind the Scenes; Chicago Med Season 1 Crossover Episode – "Malignant"; Chicago P.D. Season 3 Crossover Episode – "Now I'm God"
August 30, 2016			Behind the Scenes; Chicago Med Season 1 Crossover Episode – "Malignant"; Chicago P.D. Season 3 Crossover Episode – "Now I'm God"
