= Chicago Med season 2 =

Season of television series

Chicago Med
- Season 2
- Chicago Med Season 2 DVD cover
- Showrunners: Andrew Schneider; Diane Frolov
- No. of episodes: 23

Release
- Original network: NBC
- Original release: September 22, 2016 – May 11, 2017

Season chronology
- ← Previous; Season 1 Next → Season 3

The second season of Chicago Med, an American medical drama television series with executive producer Dick Wolf, and producers Michael Brandt, Peter Jankowski, Andrew Schneider and René Balcer The second season premiered September 22, 2016, concluded on May 11, 2017, and consisted of 23 episodes.

== Plot ==
Chicago Med focuses on the emergency department at Gaffney Chicago Medical Center and on its doctors and nurses as they work to save patients' lives.

== Cast ==
=== Main ===
- Nick Gehlfuss as Dr. Will Halstead, Attending Emergency Physician
- Yaya DaCosta as April Sexton, RN
- Torrey DeVitto as Dr. Natalie Manning, Pediatric/Emergency Resident
- Rachel DiPillo as Dr. Sarah Reese, Psychiatry Resident
- Colin Donnell as Dr. Connor Rhodes, Cardiothoracic Surgery Fellow
- Brian Tee as LCDR Dr. Ethan Choi, Chief Resident
- S. Epatha Merkerson as Sharon Goodwin, Chief of Services
- Oliver Platt as Dr. Daniel Charles, Chief of Psychiatry
- Marlyne Barrett as Maggie Lockwood, RN, ED Charge Nurse

=== Recurring ===
- Jeff Hephner as Dr. Jeff Clarke
- Ato Essandoh as Dr. Isidore Latham
- Jürgen Hooper as Dr. Jason Wheeler
- Brennan Brown as Dr. Sam Abrams
- Kenneth Choi as Dr. David Kwon
- Lorena Diaz as Nurse Doris
- Marc Grapey as Peter Kalmick
- Shay Rose Aljadeff as Dr. Leah Bardovi
- Patti Murin as Dr. Nina Shore
- Peter Mark Kendall as Joey Thomas
- Nick Marini as Danny Jones
- Roland Buck III as Dr. Noah Sexton
- Mekia Cox as Dr. Robin Charles
- Nora Dunn as Dr. Richardson
- Branscombe Richmond as Keoni
- Chris J. Johnson as Doug Kline
- Eddie Jemison as Dr. Stanley Stohl
- Deron J. Powell as Tate Jenkins
- Jeremy Shouldis as Dr. Marty Peterson, an anesthesiologist at Gaffney

=== Special guest star ===
- Betty Buckley as Olga Barlow

=== Crossover characters ===
- Jesse Spencer as Lieutenant Matthew Casey
- Taylor Kinney as Lieutenant Kelly Severide
- Eamonn Walker as Chief Wallace Boden
- Kara Kilmer as Paramedic In Charge Sylvie Brett
- Monica Raymund as Firefighter/Paramedic Gabriela Dawson
- Elias Koteas as Detective Alvin Olinsky
- Sophia Bush as Detective Erin Lindsay
- Jesse Lee Soffer as Detective Jay Halstead
- Amy Morton as Desk Sergeant Trudy Platt
- Alex Weisman as Paramedic Chout

== Episodes ==
No. overall	No. in season	Title	Directed by	Written by	Original release date	Prod. code	U.S. viewers (millions)
19	1	"Soul Care"	Arthur W. Forney	Diane Frolov & Andrew Schneider	September 22, 2016	201	7.02
Dr. Manning and Dr. Halstead treat a pregnant patient from a car accident and are forced to perform an emergency Caesarean section on her. Meanwhile, Dr. Choi adjusts to his new role as chief emergency resident, Dr. Reese accepts a psychiatry residency offer from Dr. Charles, and Dr. Rhodes is introduced to his new superior, Dr. Latham, who informs Dr. Rhodes he was not his first choice. Dr. Manning and new medical student Jeff Clarke connect, which infuriates Dr. Halstead.
20	2	"Win Loss"	David Rodriguez	Eli Talbert & Safura Fadavi	September 29, 2016	203	6.79
Dr. Rhodes and Dr. Manning deal with two separate infant patients, one who needs an urgent heart transplant and another whom Dr. Manning cannot successfully diagnose. Meanwhile, Dr. Halstead and Dr. Charles treat a homeless man with a vision deficiency and Dr. Choi is shadowed by a Navy corpsman as they deal with patients connected to gang violence.
21	3	"Natural History"	Michael Waxman	Stephen Hootstein & Danny Weiss	October 6, 2016	202	6.99
Dr. Halstead treats Maggie's visiting sister Denise (guest star Alexandra Grey) after Denise crashes her car due to temporary blindness. Dr. Halstead discovers that Denise is transgender and has prostate cancer. Dr. Manning and fourth-year medical student Jeff Clarke try to treat a patient who does not speak English, Dr. Reese and Dr. Charles deal with a pregnancy case that is slightly unusual, and Dr. Rhodes performs a difficult heart surgery without the consent of his attending, Dr. Latham.
22	4	"Brother's Keeper"	Stephen Cragg	Jeff Drayer & Joseph Sousa	October 13, 2016	204	6.83
Dr. Choi has an elderly patient who needs surgery, but the patient's son is refusing per his father's previous instructions. Dr. Manning and Dr. Halstead deal with an epidemic when a virus is spread to multiple patients. Dr. Reese and Dr. Charles deal with a patient in heroin withdrawal with an overbearing mother who is later discovered to be the patient's pimp, part of a sex-trafficking ring. Dr. Charles' daughter becomes the newest member of the epidemiology department.
23	5	"Extreme Measures"	Daisy von Scherler Mayer	Shelley Meals & Darin Goldberg	October 20, 2016	205	6.70
Dr. Halstead, Dr. Shore, April, and Noah attend a marathon where they deal with a bicyclist who has been run over and are forced to perform a difficult procedure. Meanwhile, Dr. Manning treats an eight-year-old girl with sudden hearing loss and Dr. Choi treats an elderly patient (guest star Betty Buckley) who has not been taking all her medication and appears to be malnourished. Also, Sharon moves forward with her divorce.
24	6	"Alternative Medicine"	Eriq La Salle	Diane Frolov & Andrew Schneider	October 27, 2016	206	7.11
Dr. Reese tries to help a previous patient, Danny, a teen involved in a sex trafficking ring, and turns to Dr. Charles and Detective Erin Lindsay (guest star Sophia Bush) to help him get out of it. Meanwhile, Dr. Manning works with a young cancer patient who has taken a turn for the worse, Dr. Halstead tends to a patient with a length of dead bowel, and Dr. Choi deals with a young patient who does experiments on herself by swallowing little metal objects.
25	7	"Inherent Bias"	Michael Waxman	Stephen Hootstein & Danny Weiss	November 3, 2016	207	6.83
Tensions arise between Sharon, Dr. Choi, and Dr. Manning when treating an old love interest of Sharon's with a fatal disease. Dr. Reese continues to help Danny, while Dr. Charles tries to prevent a surgery that Dr. Rhodes deems necessary. Meanwhile, Noah asks Dr. Halstead to do house calls for his app and April gets engaged.
26	8	"Free Will"	Charles S. Carroll	Jeff Drayer & Joseph Sousa	November 10, 2016	208	6.71
Dr. Halstead and Dr. Manning meet a patient, who is in need of a kidney transplant. His brother is a match, but he is HIV positive. Meanwhile, April finds out that she is pregnant but fears her TB treatment will harm her baby. Dr. Rhodes and Dr. Robin Charles begin to flirt much to Dr. Charles' dismay. Also, Dr. Reese receives devastating news that her patient Danny has died and Dr. Choi tends to a convict patient.
27	9	"Uncharted Territory"	Patrick Norris	Eli Talbert & Safura Fadavi	January 5, 2017	209	6.23
Dr. Choi does everything he can to prevent a fight from breaking out when he treats two MMA fighters. Dr. Manning asks Dr. Rhodes for help when treating a patient with respiratory issues, while Dr. Charles and Dr. Reese discuss a patient in need of a heart transplant. Also, April discovers her TB medication may be affecting her pregnancy and Jeff shares a secret with Dr. Manning which leads Natalie to end their relationship.
28	10	"Heart Matters"	Fred Berner	Darin Goldberg & Shelley Meals	January 12, 2017	210	6.87
Maggie admits the police officer who arrested her previously for obstruction of justice. When the officer later dies from her injuries, Trudy Platt (Amy Morton) asks for April to help with the officer's organ donations instead of Maggie out of concern for the officer's husband. Meanwhile, Dr. Halstead deals with a jockey with an eating disorder. Dr. Rhodes treats a past patient who needs a heart transplant, but she later reveals that she has relapsed.
29	11	"Graveyard Shift"	Alex Zakrzewski	Diane Frolov & Andrew Schneider	January 19, 2017	211	6.41
Everyone feels the effects of working the graveyard shift. As the psych resident on call, Dr. Reese is forced to make multiple death notifications to patients' families. Much to Tate's dismay, April gets pulled into working an extra shift. Also, Sharon calls Dr. Rhodes to the hospital to tend to a panda bear that needs surgery and Dr. Halstead is shadowed by a resident, only to find out that he has been intoxicated while on shift.
30	12	"Mirror Mirror"	Vincent Misiano	Stephen Hootstein	February 2, 2017	212	6.30
Dr. Manning and Dr. Charles tend to a patient whose daughter has similar symptoms with no physiological cause. Meanwhile, Dr. Choi and Jeff are put in a dangerous situation when they X-ray their patient and find out that he has a loaded gun up his rectum; Dr. Reese tries to connect with the patient, but fails. Dr. Halstead finds it distasteful when Dr. Stohl follows him around with a camera while filming a promotional spot for the hospital and Dr. Latham reveals to Dr. Rhodes that he has been recently diagnosed with Asperger syndrome.
31	13	"Theseus' Ship"	Kenneth Johnson	Jeff Drayer	February 9, 2017	213	6.07
Dr. Manning treats a young cancer patient who has not been receiving his chemotherapy prescription, but later discovers that, by not taking his medication, the boy's immune system has become strong enough to fight the cancer itself. Dr. Choi, Dr. Charles, and Dr. Reese treat a woman who has an unusual personality disorder while Dr. Halstead and Dr. Robin Charles try to tend to a woman who refuses treatment. Elsewhere, Dr. Rhodes and Dr. Latham take a trip to another hospital to perform a rare medical procedure.
32	14	"Cold Front"	Michael Waxman	Diane Frolov & Andrew Schneider & Danny Weiss	February 16, 2017	214	6.10
The hospital is put on high alert after they become overwhelmed with patients involved in a multi-vehicle pile-up during a blizzard. Dr. Manning and Dr. Halstead force a patient to make a decision on whether her son or her nephew will receive a blood transfusion. Dr. Choi tends to a burn victim whose condition is deteriorating and tries to see through his dying wish to say goodbye to his wife. Meanwhile, Dr. Rhodes is forced to do an emergency cesarean section on a hemorrhaging patient and Dr. Charles meets an agitated patient trying to get a prescription refilled.
33	15	"Lose Yourself"	David Rodriguez	Eli Talbert	March 2, 2017	215	8.82
Dr. Rhodes tends to a patient who survived a fall from the 33rd floor of a building, resulting in a city-wide media sensation. April receives devastating news that her baby has no heartbeat on the same day that she tends to a patient with a failing heart alongside Dr. Halstead. Dr. Choi and Dr. Manning treat a paraplegic and discover that he is using an experimental treatment to try and reverse his paralysis. Also, Dr. Reese tends to a patient who helps out people in need.
34	16	"Prisoner's Dilemma"	Laura Belsey	Joseph Sousa	March 9, 2017	216	6.29
Dr. Manning treats a comatose patient who was sexually abused and is now pregnant, but later discovers that the patient has been in a paralyzed state after a suspected stroke. After an educational visit to a psychiatric facility, Dr. Reese finds one of the teens there has harmed herself as a means to see her and soon comes to believe the patient was wrongly admitted to the psychiatric facility. Also, Dr. Rhodes and Dr. Latham operate on a young girl who collapsed mid-flight while Dr. Choi, April, and Clarke treat the girl's mother, who has ingested balloons of cocaine.
35	17	"Monday Mourning"	Fred Berner	Story by : Jeff Drayer & Danny Weiss & Paul R. Puri; Teleplay by : Jeff Drayer & Danny Weiss	March 16, 2017	217	7.35
The staff at Gaffney Medical Center mourn the loss of one of their own after a suicide. Dr. Choi and Dr. Halstead butt heads while dealing with a young patient whose symptoms mimic a stroke and Dr. Manning deals with a boy who fell into a freezing river. Also, April makes a serious decision about her relationship following her miscarriage.
36	18	"Lesson Learned"	Michael Pressman	Safura Fadavi	March 30, 2017	218	6.01
Dr. Halstead makes quick and difficult decisions when tending to an Alzheimer's patient who was also his mentor in medical school. Dr. Rhodes performs a risky surgery on a young boy as an alternative to amputating his arm. Meanwhile, Dr. Charles and Dr. Reese tend to a patient who denies having suicidal tendencies. Also, Maggie takes an aggressive route when training a new nursing student and Dr. Reese continues to mourn the loss of Jason Wheeler. After re-watching a speech his stricken mentor gave his own graduating class, Dr. Halstead makes his painful but necessary final decision.
37	19	"Ctrl Alt"	Valerie Weiss	Story by : Stephen Hootstein & Jason Cho; Teleplay by : Stephen Hootstein	April 6, 2017	219	5.98
Chaos hits the hospital when the computer system gets hacked by an unknown source that asks for a ransom to bring it back online. Meanwhile, Sharon has an awkward encounter when her ex-husband brings in his new girlfriend to get treated for an injury. Dr. Choi tries to locate a bullet fragment that has migrated from the original wound. Also, Dr. Reese feels Dr. Charles is pushing her out of psychiatry and Dr. Rhodes is concerned by Dr. Robin Charles' erratic behavior. After the computer system comes back online, Sharon is stunned to discover who paid the hackers' ransom—and anguished when learning the truth about her ex's new girlfriend.
38	20	"Generation Gap"	Stephen Cragg	Shelley Meals & Darin Goldberg	April 13, 2017	220	6.16
Dr. Halstead asks for Dr. Rhodes' help in admitting his overbearing father against his wishes due to a failing heart. Meanwhile, Dr. Choi deals with a teenage patient who desperately needs to control his sexual urges. Dr. Manning and Jeff Clarke tend to a child who they discover has been neglected by his overworked mother. Also, Dr. Rhodes asks Dr. Charles to confront Robin over her erratic behavior. Dr. Reese teaches a class of high schoolers the responsibilities of raising a child by using dolls.
39	21	"Deliver Us"	Holly Dale	Jeff Drayer & Joseph Sousa	April 27, 2017	221	6.04
Dr. Rhodes and Dr. Manning tend to a pregnant patient whose fetus is the cure to its sister's cancer. Meanwhile, Dr. Charles has Dr. Reese perform the psychiatric evaluation on his daughter Robin as a means of keeping his nose in the entire process. Also, Dr. Choi gets tough on April's brother Noah when a residency opens up.
40	22	"White Butterflies"	Eriq La Salle	Stephen Hootstein & Eli Talbert	May 4, 2017	222	6.40
After Robin is admitted on psychiatric hold, Dr. Rhodes opposes Dr. Charles and Dr. Reese to get her released. Meanwhile, Dr. Manning gets help from Detective Jay Halstead while treating a young patient who was assaulted. Dr. Choi and April have a disagreement over the treatment of a patient.
41	23	"Love Hurts"	Michael Waxman	Story by : Diane Frolov & Andrew Schneider & Gabriel L. Feinberg; Teleplay by : Diane Frolov & Andrew Schneider	May 11, 2017	223	7.01
Robin is admitted back to the psychiatric facility, but Dr. Reese takes a different approach to her treatment. She and Dr. Charles soon discover that she has a tumor causing her psychological outbursts. Meanwhile, Dr. Halstead and Dr. Manning work on a refugee patient. Also, April tries to avoid Dr. Choi following his pass at her. In the end, Dr. Halstead admits the truth to both himself and Dr. Shore when he finally decides to break up with her after prompting from his brother, Jay. Meanwhile, Dr. Rhodes may have a new love interest and Dr. Charles' life hangs in the balance when a deranged patient loses his patience, shooting Daniel and then himself.

== Production ==
=== Casting ===
After appearing in the season 1 finale, Jeff Hephner appeared as former firefighter, current fourth-year med student Jeff Clarke for multiple episodes in season 2. Mekia Cox joins the cast as Dr. Robin Charles, an epidemiologist and daughter of Dr. Daniel Charles, in a recurring role.

== Ratings ==
Viewership and ratings per episode of Chicago Med season 2
No.	Title	Air date	Rating/share (18–49)	Viewers (millions)	DVR (18–49)	DVR viewers (millions)	Total (18–49)	Total viewers (millions)
1	"Soul Care"	September 22, 2016	1.4/5	7.02	1.0	3.69	2.4	10.71
2	"Win Loss"	September 29, 2016	1.3/4	6.79	0.9	3.33	2.2	10.12
3	"Natural History"	October 6, 2016	1.3/4	6.99	0.8	3.08	2.1	9.95
4	"Brother's Keeper"	October 13, 2016	1.3/4	6.83	0.9	3.20	2.2	10.03
5	"Extreme Measures"	October 20, 2016	1.2/4	6.70	0.9	3.19	2.1	9.90
6	"Alternative Medicine"	October 27, 2016	1.5/5	7.11	0.8	3.28	2.3	10.38
7	"Inherent Bias"	November 3, 2016	1.3/5	6.83	0.9	3.28	2.2	10.12
8	"Free Will"	November 10, 2016	1.4/5	6.71	0.8	3.52	2.2	10.21
9	"Uncharted Territory"	January 5, 2017	1.2/4	6.23	0.8	3.07	2.0	9.30
10	"Heart Matters"	January 12, 2017	1.3/5	6.87	0.8	3.23	2.1	10.09
11	"Graveyard Shift"	January 19, 2017	1.2/4	6.41	0.9	3.28	2.1	9.69
12	"Mirror Mirror"	February 2, 2017	1.2/4	6.30	0.9	3.26	2.1	9.56
13	"Theseus' Ship"	February 9, 2017	1.1/4	6.07	0.9	3.27	2.0	9.37
14	"Cold Front"	February 16, 2017	1.2/4	6.10	0.8	3.19	2.0	9.29
15	"Lose Yourself"	March 2, 2017	1.7/6	8.82	—N/a	—N/a	—N/a	—N/a
16	"Prisoner's Dilemma"	March 9, 2017	1.1/4	6.29	0.7	3.14	1.9	9.46
17	"Monday Mourning"	March 16, 2017	1.4/5	7.35	0.7	3.07	2.1	10.41
18	"Lesson Learned"	March 30, 2017	0.9/3	6.01	0.9	3.21	1.8	9.32
19	"Ctrl Alt"	April 6, 2017	1.0/4	5.98	0.7	3.16	1.7	9.14
20	"Generation Gap"	April 13, 2017	1.1/4	6.16	0.8	3.16	1.9	9.52
21	"Deliver Us"	April 27, 2017	1.0/4	6.04	—N/a	—N/a	—N/a	—N/a
22	"White Butterflies"	May 4, 2017	1.1/4	6.40	0.9	3.33	2.0	9.70
23	"Love Hurts"	May 11, 2017	1.2/5	7.01	0.9	3.36	2.1	10.36

== Home media ==
The DVD release of season two was released in Region 1 on August 29, 2017.

The Complete Second Season
Set details			Special features
23 episodes; 982 minutes (Region 1); 6-disc set; 1.78:1 aspect ratio; Languages: English (Dolby Digital 5.1); Subtitles: English (Region 1); French (Region 1)			
Release dates
United States	United Kingdom	Australia	
August 29, 2017	September 18, 2017	November 15, 2017	
