= Law & Order: Special Victims Unit season 15 =

Season of American television series

Law & Order: Special Victims Unit
- Season 15
- Season 15 U.S. DVD cover
- Starring: Mariska Hargitay; Danny Pino; Kelli Giddish; Richard Belzer; Ice-T; Raúl Esparza; Dann Florek
- No. of episodes: 24

Release
- Original network: NBC
- Original release: September 25, 2013 – May 21, 2014

Season chronology
- ← Previous; Season 14 Next → Season 16

The fifteenth season of Law & Order: Special Victims Unit made its debut with a two-hour premiere episode on September 25, 2013, at 9pm/8c - 11pm/10c (Eastern), on NBC. The season ended on May 21, 2014, after 24 episodes.

== Production ==
Law & Order: Special Victims Unit was renewed for a fifteenth season on April 26, 2013, which consists of 24 episodes. Cast member Mariska Hargitay (Detective Olivia Benson) revealed on May 25, 2013, that her contract had been renewed for the upcoming season. Ice-T (Detective Fin Tutuola) announced on Twitter that filming on the fifteenth season commenced on July 24, 2013.

In August 2013, Leight revealed that the storyline for the fifteenth season would pick up where the finale of the previous season had ended, with some high drama in particular for Benson; "Olivia will very much be dealing with and reeling from her encounter with Lewis...her character's got incredible empathy for others and yet has had a hard time looking out for herself. This is the season where she's talked the talk to others, but she hasn't had to walk the walk until now".

== Cast changes ==
=== Returning cast and characters ===
On July 12, 2013, it was announced that Raúl Esparza would be elevated to the main cast as ADA Rafael Barba during this season. Esparza portrayed Barba in a recurring capacity during the series' fourteenth season. On the promotion, SVU executive producer and showrunner Warren Leight expressed, "Making [Esparza] a series regular is a small way of acknowledging his enormous contribution to our show." Barba is the first regular ADA on the series since Alexandra Cabot (Stephanie March) in the eleventh season.

On October 2, 2013, it was announced that Broadway actress Jessica Phillips would return to the series for a recurring role as ADA Pippa Cox. Phillips previously guest starred as ADA Cox in the fourteenth season's "Born Psychopath".

=== Departing cast and characters ===
On September 27, 2013, it was announced that Richard Belzer (Sergeant John Munch) would depart the main cast in the fifth episode, "Wonderland Story". The storyline showed Munch retiring from the Special Victims Unit after 15 years in order to move onto becoming a Special District Attorney Investigator, which allowed the character to make future recurring appearances on the series. Belzer, one of the series' original cast members, collectively portrayed Munch for 20 years as a regular on Homicide: Life on the Street (1993–99) and later SVU, in conjunction with guest appearances in other Law & Order universe shows.

On December 10, 2013, it was announced that Dann Florek (Captain Donald Cragen) would depart SVU in an episode airing in January 2014. The storyline was revealed in "Internal Affairs", in which he reveals to Benson (Hargitay) that like Munch, he too has his days left at SVU numbered, as he is approaching the mandatory retirement age limit. Like Belzer, Florek was one of the series' original cast members, portraying Cragen for fifteen consecutive seasons. Florek was the last link to the original series, portraying Captain Cragen in the first three seasons of Law & Order (1990–93), returning for guest appearances in later seasons, as well as appearing in Exiled: A Law & Order Movie (1998).

== Cast ==
=== Main ===
- Mariska Hargitay as Senior Detective / Sergeant Olivia Benson
- Danny Pino as Junior Detective Nick Amaro
- Kelli Giddish as Junior Detective Amanda Rollins
- Richard Belzer as Sergeant John Munch (episodes 1–5)
- Ice-T as Senior Detective Odafin "Fin" Tutuola
- Raúl Esparza as Assistant District Attorney Rafael Barba
- Dann Florek as Captain Donald "Don" Cragen (episodes 1–11)

=== Special guest stars ===
- BD Wong as FBI Special Agent Dr. George Huang
- Tamara Tunie as Medical Examiner Melinda Warner

=== Crossover stars ===
- Alana de la Garza as Assistant United States Attorney Connie Rubirosa (semi-crossover - four years after the Rubirosa character left the Manhattan District Attorney's office of Law & Order)
- Sophia Bush as Chicago Police Department Detective Erin Lindsay (Crossing over with Chicago P.D.)

=== Recurring ===
- Laura Benanti as Maria Grazie Amaro
- Curt Bouril as Detective Carlson
- Ami Brabson as Judge Karyn Blake
- Stephen C. Bradbury as Judge Colin McNamara
- Robert John Burke as Internal Affairs Bureau Lieutenant Ed Tucker
- Jason Cerbone as Defense Attorney Terrence Quinn
- Skyler Day as Renee Clark
- Dashiell Eaves as Sergeant Kevin Donlan
- Nikki Estridge as Detective Delano
- Allison Fernandez as Zara Amaro
- Greg Germann as Assistant District Attorney Derek Strauss
- Jacqueline Hardy as Defense Attorney Crane
- Mel Harris as Eileen Switzer
- Peter Herrmann as Defense Attorney Trevor Langan
- Tabitha Holbert as Assistant District Attorney Rose Callier
- Jayne Houdyshell as Judge Ruth Linden
- Bill Irwin as Dr. Peter Lindstrom
- Donal Logue as Lieutenant Declan Murphy
- Sonia Manzano as Judge Gloria Pepitone
- Elizabeth Marvel as Defense Attorney Rita Calhoun
- Michael Mastro as Judge Serani
- Lauren Noble as Carmen
- Leslie Odom Jr. as Reverend Curtis Scott
- Josh Pais as Deputy Commissioner Hank Abraham
- Jessica Phillips as Assistant District Attorney Pippa Cox
- David Pittu as Defense Attorney Linus Tate
- Michael Potts as Sergeant Cole Draper
- Thomas Sadoski as Nate Davis
- Pablo Schreiber as William Lewis
- Stefanie Scott as Clare Wilson
- Jenna Stern as Judge Elana Barth
- Sarah Street as Dr. Janice Cole
- Jeffrey Tambor as Defense Attorney Ben Cohen
- Karen Tsen Lee as Medical Examiner Susan Chung
- Aida Turturro as Judge Felicia Catano
- Nia Vardalos as Defense Attorney Minonna Efron
- Caris Vujcec as Detective Louise Campesi
- Delaney Williams as Defense Attorney John Buchanan
- Dean Winters as Detective Brian Cassidy

=== Guest stars ===
After appearing in the fourteenth-season finale, Dean Winters (Brian Cassidy), Pablo Schreiber (William Lewis), and Lauren Ambrose (Vanessa Mayer) continued their respective portrayals in the season premiere episode, "Surrender Benson". Winters also starred in the subsequent episodes, "Imprisoned Lives", "Internal Affairs", and "Wonderland Story". Cybill Shepherd guest starred in the 'ripped from the headlines' third episode of the season, which combines the killing of Trayvon Martin case and the Paula Deen racial epithet controversy. Shepherd's character, Jolene Castille, thought she was being pursued by a rapist and turned around to discover it was a teenager. She shot him. Jeffrey Tambor reprised his role as Defense Attorney Ben Cohen in this episode, to represent Castille.

David Conrad, who had originally auditioned to play detective Nick Amaro, appeared in "Internal Affairs" as Officer West, together with Nadia Dajani as Officer Ryan Quinn, who were suspected of raping young women during their shifts.

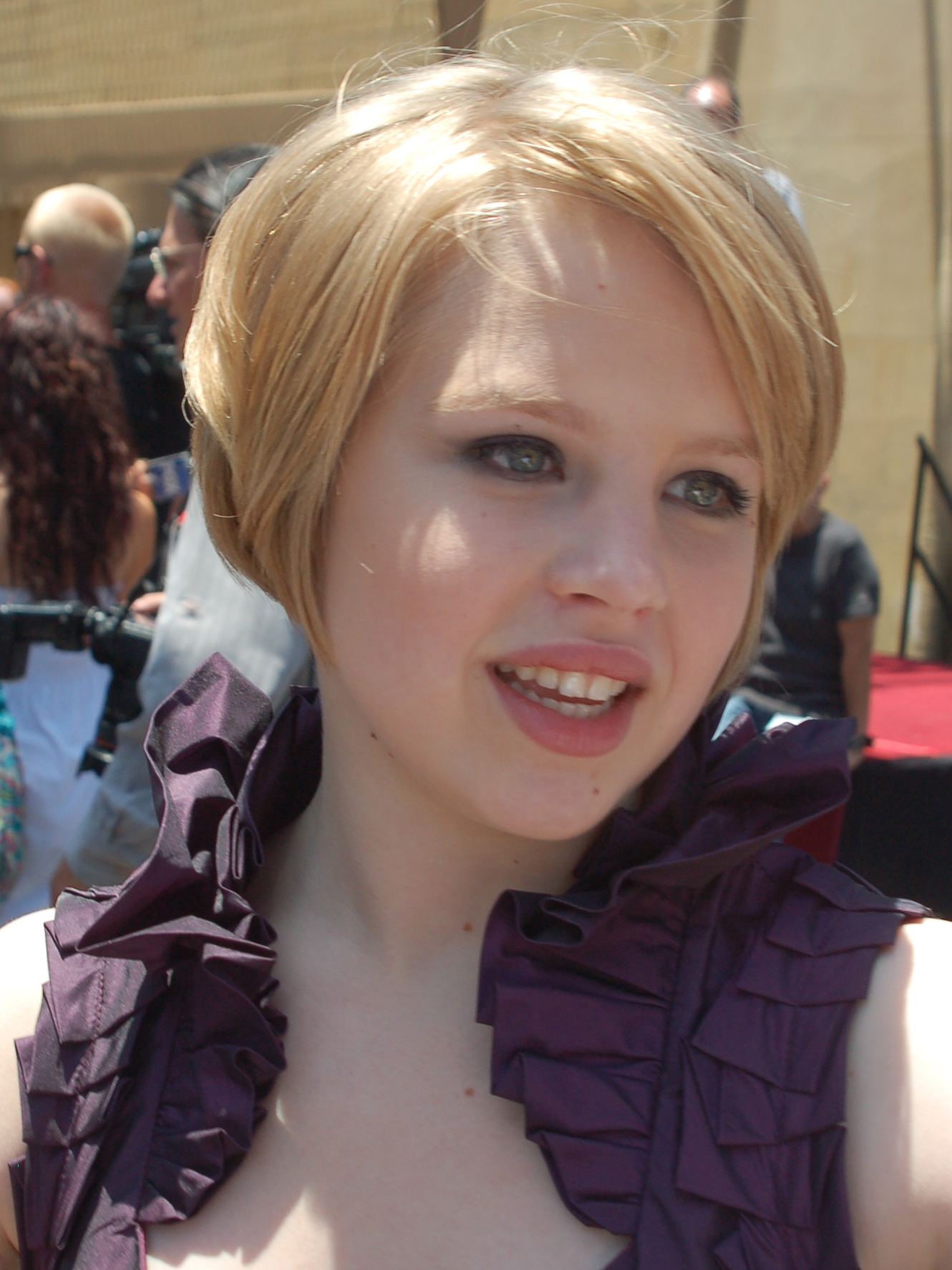
Sofia Vassilieva appears in "Wonderland Story", reprising her role as Sarah Walsh from season thirteen.

In "Wonderland Story", Sofia Vassilieva guest starred as Sarah Walsh, a rape victim who needed the help of Detective Benson after being raped again. Vassilieva first appeared as Walsh in the thirteenth season's "True Believers". Munch's resignation in this episode welcomed back his ex-wives Gwen Munch (Carol Kane) and Billie Lou Hatfield (Ellen McElduff) and his former Homicide: Life on the Street co-worker, Baltimore Detective Meldrick Lewis (Clark Johnson).

Kirk Acevedo appeared as Eddie Garcia in "October Surprise", a childhood friend of ADA Rafael Barba (Raúl Esparza). Originally, Acevedo played District Attorney investigator Hector Salazar in the short-lived Law & Order spin-off, Law & Order: Trial by Jury. He had made an appearance on SVU in the sixth season's TBJ-SVU crossover episode "Night".

Tony Award winner Billy Porter guest starred in "Dissonant Voices" as singing coach and television personality Jackie Walker, who was accused of sexual abuse by his students. The X Factor season 2 contestant Carly Rose Sonenclar portrayed Grace Belsey in this episode. Ashanti, Clay Aiken and Taylor Hicks make cameos as judges on a reality show.

In "Military Justice", Shiri Appleby made a special appearance as Amelia Albers, a junior officer who appeared to have been raped by her group of soldiers. In the same episode, Laura Benanti returns as Maria Grazie, the ex-wife of Detective Amaro, who provides information about the case to the SVU squad. Terry Serpico appears as Lieutenant Commander Travers, the commanding officer of Albers, and Delaney Williams returns as Defense Attorney John Buchanan.

In "Rapist Anonymous", Nia Vardalos returned as Defense Attorney Minonna Efron, having previously appeared in the season 14 episode, "Criminal Hatred". In the same episode, former co-star of The Killing, Amy Seimetz and Thomas Sadoski guest starred. Mel Harris appears in "Rapist Anonymous" and "Amaro’s One-Eighty" as Eileen Switzer, the new girlfriend of Captain Cragen.

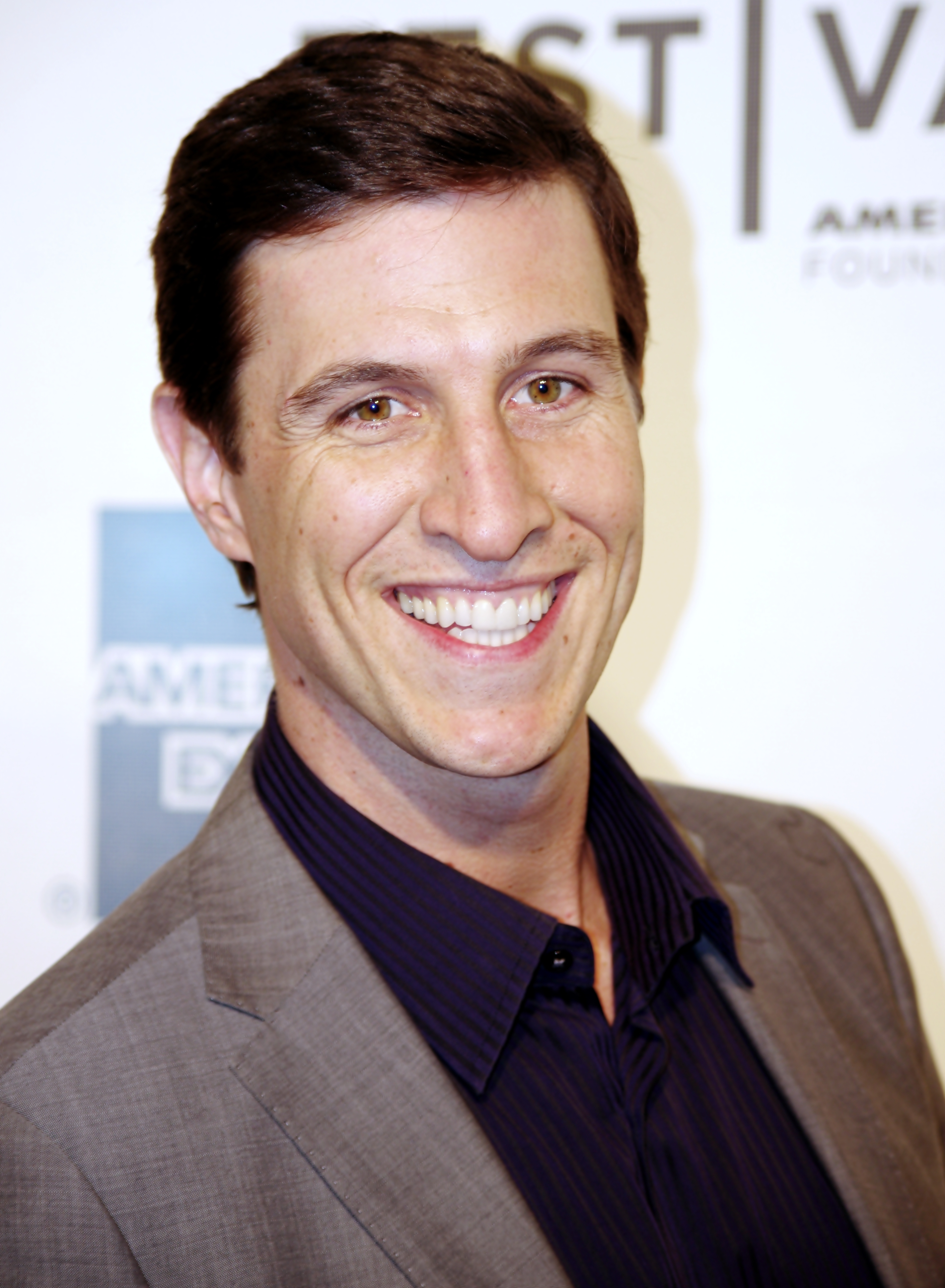
Pablo Schreiber appears in "Surrender Benson", reprising his role as William Lewis from the previous season finale.

It was announced that Pablo Schreiber would return in the tenth episode of the season, "Psycho/Therapist", as William Lewis, when facing trial for kidnapping and assault to Detective Olivia Benson. Renée Elise Goldsberry guest stars in the same episode as the lawyer Martha Brown, who defends Lewis.

In "Amaro’s One-Eighty", Cathy Moriarty returned as Captain Toni Howard. In the same episode, Elizabeth Marvel reprises her role as defense attorney Rita Calhoun and Greg Germann returns as ADA Derek Strauss. In "Jersey Breakdown", Alana de la Garza returned as her Law & Order character, Connie Rubirosa, four years after leaving the Manhattan District Attorney's office and now working as a federal prosecutor heading up a joint task force on underage sex trafficking. In the same episode, Bill Sage, Chazz Palminteri, Stefanie Scott, and Dayton Callie guest star.

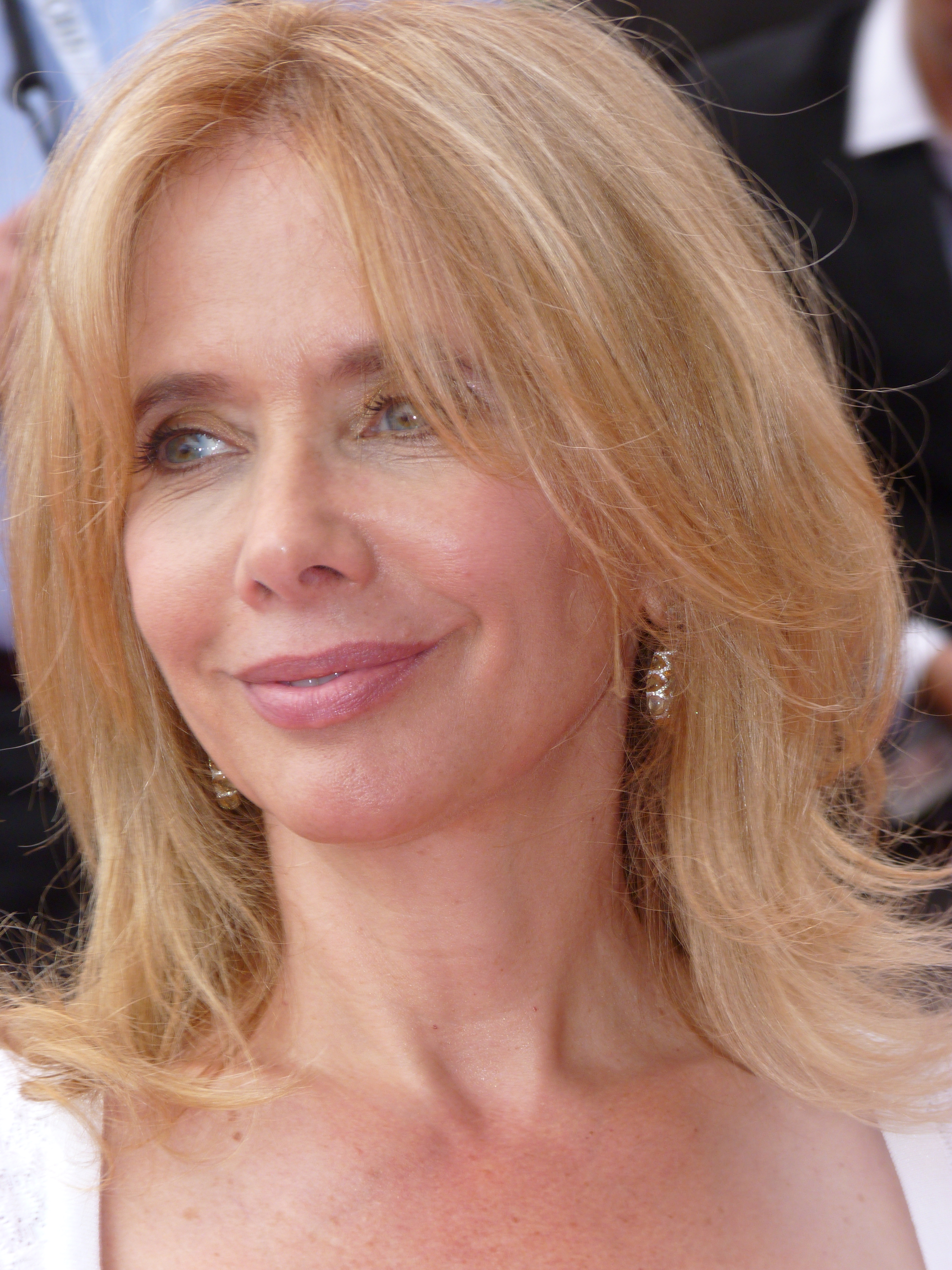
Rosanna Arquette portrays Alexa Pierson in the fourteenth episode "Wednesday's Child".

Rosanna Arquette and Mark Boone Junior guest star in "Wednesday’s Child" playing a criminal couple, known for child endangerment and pornography. Josh Pais guest stars in the same episode playing Hank Abraham, who also appears in "October Surprise".

Sophia Bush guest stars as her Chicago P.D. character Detective Erin Lindsay in the first part of a planned Law & Order: Special Victims Unit/Chicago PD crossover slated to air on February 26, 2014, after the 2014 Winter Olympics. The episode is titled "Comic Perversion", Jonathan Silverman, Laura Slade Wiggins, and Elizabeth Marvel guest star, Skyler Day returns as Reneè Clark, a character who also plays in the episode "Girl Dishonored" in season 14.

In "Gridiron Soldier", Glenn Morshower and Greg Finley guest star. Thomas Sadoski returns as Nate Davis, a character who also appeared in the previous episode "Rapist Anonymous". In "Gambler's Fallacy", Donal Logue and Sherri Saum guest star as two club managers. Stefanie Scott returns as Clare Wilson. Donal Logue has a recurring role starting in this episode until the end of the season, as Lieutenant Declan Murphy.

Alec Baldwin returns to television in "Criminal Stories" playing Jimmy MacArthur, a controversial New York newspaper columnist who questions the SVU squad's motives during the investigation of a potential hate crime/rape case. The episode also marks the directorial debut of Mariska Hargitay, whose character, Sergeant Olivia Benson, goes head to head with MacArthur. Katie Couric also makes a cameo appearance, playing herself as a talk show host who quizzes MacArthur about the headline grabbing case. Summer Bishil and Questlove guest star.

In "Reasonable Doubt", Bradley Whitford, Celia Kennan-Bolger, Aida Turturro, Emma Bell, and Samantha Mathis guest star. This is the second appearance of Mathis on the show as she had first appeared in "Control", the ninth episode of the fifth season. She had also auditioned for the role of Detective Olivia Benson in 1999. Jeffrey Tambor returns as counselor Lester Cohen. Geraldo Rivera and Ann Curry make cameo appearances.

BD Wong guest stars as Dr. George Huang in the episode entitled "Thought Criminal". This marks Wong's third appearance on the show after his departure in season 12. Nia Vardalos and Laura Benanti return as counselor Minnona Efron and Marie Grazie respectively. Joshua Malina and Brian Baumgartner guest star.

Richard Belzer returns to SVU as DA Investigator John Munch in the season finale, "Spring Awakening". This is his first appearance on the series since his departure in the fifth episode of season 15. Peter Hermann who is married to Hargitay in real life, returns as counselor Trevor Langan. His last appearance in the show was in the third episode of the twelfth season. Jason Cerbone guest stars. Michael Potts makes his second appearance in the season. Jessica Phillips returns as ADA Pippa Cox in the episode, previously starring in Season 14 as well as two episodes in the fifteenth season. ADA Cox was in charge of the Baby Boy Doe case.

== Episodes ==
Law & Order: Special Victims Unit season 15 episodes
No. overall	No. in season	Title	Directed by	Written by	Original release date	Prod. code	U.S. viewers (millions)
320	1	"Surrender Benson"	Michael Smith	Warren Leight & Julie Martin	September 25, 2013	1501	9.58
Hours turn into days, and with no word from Detective Benson, the Special Victims Unit takes drastic measures to find her and her abductor, William Lewis (Pablo Schreiber). As Benson fights for her life, her squad follows a trail of murder and rape victims throughout Long Island, which leads them to fear it may be too late.
321	2	"Imprisoned Lives"	Michael Slovis	Julie Martin & Warren Leight	September 25, 2013	1502	9.58
Just as Benson returns from her two-month leave, an abandoned child in Times Square leads the SVU to more victims in the basement of a home. As they work to solve the decade-old case, Benson tries to prove to herself that she is ready to be back on the job, despite Captain Cragen's and her new therapist Dr. Lindstrom's (Bill Irwin) reservations.: Based on the Ariel Castro kidnappings
322	3	"American Tragedy"	Fred Berner	Story by : Jill Abbinanti; Teleplay by : Warren Leight & Julie Martin	October 2, 2013	1503	6.85
When a string of rapes puts SVU and the city on high alert, a celebrity chef (Cybill Shepherd) fears she is the next victim and claims self-defense after fatally shooting a black teenager in a hoodie. The case evolves into a murder trial for a racially charged shooting, putting pressure on ADA Barba to get a conviction. This episode combines elements from the real-life killing of Trayvon Martin and the racist outbursts of celebrity chef, Paula Deen.: Special appearances by Cybill Shepherd
323	4	"Internal Affairs"	Jean de Segonzac	Kevin Fox	October 9, 2013	1504	6.31
When an officer gets placed in a psychiatric ward after accusing his precinct of sexual misconduct, IAB Lt. Tucker (Robert John Burke) asks SVU to lead his investigation. Tucker recruits Brian Cassidy to go undercover in the crooked precinct, offering him the chance to regain his detective's shield. With SVU watching Cassidy's every move, they realize he could be in grave danger.: Special appearances by Robert John Burke as Lt. Ed Tucker
324	5	"Wonderland Story"	Jennifer Getzinger	Story by : Ed Zuckerman & Lawrence Kaplow; Teleplay by : Warren Leight & Julie Martin	October 16, 2013	1505	7.48
After a night of partying, a rape victim (Sofia Vassilieva) seeks help from Benson after she believes she has been raped again. The search for her attacker leads the detectives to a world of underground parties and a cyber mogul who preys on vulnerable girls. Meanwhile, the SVU comes together to celebrate the retirement of Sergeant Munch.: Special appearances by Clark Johnson as Meldrick Lewis, Carol Kane as Gwen Munch, Ellen McElduff as Billie Lou Hatfield, and David Steinberg as Munch's brother. Kane, McElduff and Johnson reprise their roles from Homicide: Life on the Street. Kane previously played Gwen Munch in the tenth season finale, "Zebras". Munch refers to the Kane and McElduff characters as "two of my ex-wives".; Richard Belzer (Sergeant John Munch) departed the cast after this episode.; Sofia Vassilieva previously appeared as Sarah Walsh in the thirteenth season episode "True Believers".
325	6	"October Surprise"	Peter Werner	Story by : Warren Leight & Peter Blauner; Teleplay by : Peter Blauner	October 23, 2013	1506	5.53
When Barba's childhood friend is arrested for attempted rape, his connection to Alex Muñoz (Vincent Laresca), a mayoral frontrunner, puts his campaign in jeopardy. When an undercover investigation uncovers further misconduct by Muñoz, Detective Amaro and the SVU team wonder if Barba can put aside personal feelings to prosecute the man he used to idolize.: Cameo appearance by Lester Holt as news anchor.; Partially based on the Anthony Weiner sexting scandals.
326	7	"Dissonant Voices"	Alex Chapple	John P. Roche	November 6, 2013	1507	5.65
A popular singing coach and television personality (Billy Porter) is accused of sexual abuse by a four-year-old student at a prestigious private school. While Detective Rollins urges the squad to give the man the benefit of the doubt, Benson's investigation uncovers condemning evidence and more victims come forward.: Special guest appearance by Billy Porter
327	8	"Military Justice"	Tom DiCillo	Lawrence Kaplow	November 13, 2013	1508	6.16
A Coast Guard officer (Shiri Appleby) is stopped for a DUI while on leave in New York City, but the arresting officer calls SVU when she appears to have been raped. The detectives home in on a group of officers in her unit as suspects, but her commanding officer (Terry Serpico) hinders the investigation. When Amaro asks his wife to dig up information, he jeopardizes Barba's case.
328	9	"Rapist Anonymous"	Steve Shill	Julie Martin & Warren Leight	November 20, 2013	1509	5.97
Rollins' friend from her Gamblers Anonymous meeting claims she was raped by her lover, but the case is challenging to prove. Things get further complicated when a murder occurs, and Rollins is caught in the middle between her squad and someone who she thought was her friend. When Barba is forced to reveal some of Rollins' personal life on the stand, it proves too much for her to handle. Meanwhile, Benson announces her promotion to sergeant and Cassidy is reinstated as a detective.
329	10	"Psycho/Therapist"	Michael Slovis	Warren Leight & Julie Martin	January 8, 2014	1510	8.81
The trial of serial rapist William Lewis (Pablo Schreiber) once again brings Benson face-to-face with her attacker and the stress of reliving the attacks causes setbacks in her recovery. With Lewis trying every trick in the book, including representing himself at trial, Benson is forced to reveal secrets she has kept about her attack. Four months after the trial, Lewis feigns an injury to escape from prison.: Special guest appearance by Pablo Schreiber as William Lewis
330	11	"Amaro's One-Eighty"	Nick Gomez	Story by : Warren Leight & Julie Martin; Teleplay by : Kevin Fox	January 15, 2014	1511	5.44
After leaving a dinner party at Benson's apartment, Amaro and Rollins witness an officer in the chase of a suspected drug dealer. A standoff leads to gunfire and a teenage boy is gravely wounded. When the evidence leads to a shocking revelation, the SVU squad struggles to keep IAB Lt. Tucker and recently assigned Detective Cassidy from jumping to conclusions. As the case becomes a public spectacle, special prosecutor Derek Strauss (Greg Germann) pushes for a grand jury indictment and Amaro begins to question if fighting for his badge is best for his family. Meanwhile, Cragen announces his retirement from the NYPD.: Dann Florek (Captain Donald Cragen) departed the cast after this episode.; Special guest appearance by Greg Germann
331	12	"Jersey Breakdown"	Jonathan Herron	Story by : Julie Martin & Céline C. Robinson; Teleplay by : Céline C. Robinson	January 22, 2014	1512	6.68
When an underage runaway (Stefanie Scott) is found beaten and raped, the girl leads SVU to a strip club owner (Chazz Palminteri), who denies any wrongdoing. After New Jersey police arrest the girl, Barba calls on Assistant U.S. Attorney Connie Rubirosa (Alana de la Garza) for help. But when Barba and Rubirosa fail to get the help they need from Jersey law enforcement, SVU begins to suspect a coverup in the Hudson County Prosecutor's Office.
332	13	"Betrayal's Climax"	Holly Dale	Jill Abbinanti	January 29, 2014	1513	7.59
Detectives respond to a suspected kidnapping of a 16-year-old girl and the father points fingers at her boyfriend, who detectives discover is part of a local gang. After the girl is found during a suicide attempt, she reveals she was gang-raped while her boyfriend was forced to watch and that she had regrettably experienced multiple orgasms during the assault. With the girl afraid to testify and the boyfriend refusing to aid in the investigation, Amaro finds evidence the gang was responsible for more than just the attack.
333	14	"Wednesday's Child"	Laura Belsey	Story by : Peter Blauner & Warren Leight; Teleplay by : Peter Blauner	February 5, 2014	1514	6.24
When a father (John Benjamin Hickey) discovers his son missing from his bed, detectives suspect the boy wandered off alone because of his history of behavioral problems. The search becomes more urgent when the boy's insulin pump runs out and a dangerous criminal couple is spotted with the boy. With the boy still missing, detectives try to turn the wife (Rosanna Arquette) against her husband (Mark Boone Junior).: Special guest appearance by Rosanna Arquette
334	15	"Comic Perversion"	Alex Chapple	Story by : Brianna Yellen, Julie Martin, & Warren Leight; Teleplay by : Brianna Yellen	February 26, 2014	1515	7.78
When a college student is raped after heckling a comedian (Jonathan Silverman) for making rape jokes, ADA Barba tells SVU they cannot arrest the comedian based on his words alone. After another student accuses the comedian of rape, Benson quickly arrests the man, giving Barba a tough circumstantial case which propels him to call out Benson on the arrest. Meanwhile, Chicago police officer Erin Lindsay (Sophia Bush) comes to Manhattan to ask SVU for help.: Special guest appearance by Sophia Bush as Erin Lindsay; This episode begins a crossover with Chicago P.D. that concludes on "Conventions".; In the Netflix version, the scene with Bush is cut.
335	16	"Gridiron Soldier"	Jean de Segonzac	Story by : John P. Roche & Julie Martin; Teleplay by : John P. Roche	March 5, 2014	1516	6.01
After a high school football star goes missing in NYC, his uncle seeks helps from Rollins, who is a hometown friend. When Rollins finds the boy in jail, she begins to suspect that he was a victim of a cruel prank by the Hudson University football team. Although she is initially hesitant to let the investigation proceed, Benson lets Amaro and Rollins look into the team's culture, which uncovers several victims of abuse, prejudice and hazing.
336	17	"Gambler's Fallacy"	Alex Chapple	Story by : Kevin Fox; Teleplay by : Julie Martin & Warren Leight	March 12, 2014	1517	6.28
When Rollins' gambling addiction drives her to an illegal club, a waitress tips the club managers off that she is a cop. Rollins strikes a deal with the managers to make her illegal activity disappear, but when her debt is not paid to their liking, she becomes involved in a unthinkable crime, which forces Benson and Detective Tutuola to suspect her guilt.
337	18	"Criminal Stories"	Mariska Hargitay	Story by : Warren Leight & Julie Martin; Teleplay by : Peter Blauner	March 19, 2014	1518	5.82
A renowned journalist, Jimmy MacArthur (Alec Baldwin), is given an inside look into the SVU to profile their new commanding officer, Sergeant Benson. When a young Muslim woman is raped, he interferes with the investigation and declares the crime a hoax. With the victim facing public scrutiny, Benson and Barba fight to keep the case on solid ground and get a conviction.: Cameo appearance by Katie Couric as TV anchor.; Special guest appearance by Alec Baldwin
338	19	"Downloaded Child"	Adam Bernstein	Story by : Julie Martin & Warren Leight; Teleplay by : Jill Abbinanti	April 2, 2014	1519	5.90
When a mother (Meghann Fahy) refuses to trust anyone to take care of her daughter, she leaves the child home alone for days. The mother's fear of men leads Benson to suspect she may have been a victim herself. With help from Dr. Lindstrom, she recovers repressed childhood memories of violence, rape, and neglect. Meanwhile, Benson breaks off her relationship with Cassidy after realizing that their lives are going in different directions.: Based on the story of "Amy Unknown".
339	20	"Beast's Obsession"	Steve Shill	Warren Leight & Julie Martin	April 9, 2014	1520	7.41
William Lewis (Pablo Schreiber) escapes from prison and begins another killing rampage. 1PP removes Benson as commanding officer of Manhattan SVU and assigns Lt. Declan Murphy (Donal Logue) to lead the manhunt for the sadistic murderer. Benson is given a 24-hour security detail and instructed to stay at the precinct, but when Lewis kidnaps a young girl Benson is forced to decide how much she is willing to sacrifice in order to save the child's life.: Special guest appearance by Pablo Schreiber as William Lewis
340	21	"Post-Mortem Blues"	Michael Slovis	Julie Martin & Warren Leight	April 30, 2014	1521	6.20
Benson is rescued by the squad moments after Lewis' final act and IAB Lt. Tucker's investigation is deemed inconclusive into Benson's actions. When the Brooklyn DA's Office, led by ADA Strauss, convenes a grand jury to investigate her actions, Benson's torment continues and she must choose between her badge and her convictions.
341	22	"Reasonable Doubt"	Alex Chapple	Kevin Fox & Robert Brooks Cohen	May 7, 2014	1522	5.34
The SVU squad investigates renowned television producer, Frank Maddox (Bradley Whitford), when he is accused of molesting his eight-year-old daughter. His estranged wife (Samantha Mathis) wants to know the truth but when she refuses to cooperate with the authorities, the detectives suspect it was a ploy to win the public's favor. With Maddox engaged to his ex-wife's younger sister (Emma Bell), Benson fights to help the child amid the media circus.
342	23	"Thought Criminal"	Adam Bernstein	Story by : Peter Blauner, Julie Martin, & Warren Leight; Teleplay by : Peter Blauner	May 14, 2014	1523	5.42
Murphy leads the squad in an undercover operation targeting sex offenders and they soon discover a well-regarded photographer, Simon Wilkes (Joshua Malina), whose fantasies may have crossed the line into reality at a child's expense. After a horrific discovery, the detectives push Barba to take the tough case to trial.
343	24	"Spring Awakening"	Norberto Barba	Story by : Warren Leight, Julie Martin, & Kevin Fox; Teleplay by : Warren Leight & Julie Martin	May 21, 2014	1524	6.39
Amaro is charged by the DA's office after assaulting Simon Wilkes while off duty and Munch returns to provide him with much needed advice. Meanwhile, the squad investigates a string of male tourist rapes and robberies, with Murphy leading another undercover sting. When a couple is arrested as suspects, the woman is found to have a surprising connection to Baby Boy Doe, whose custody hearings continue to distract Benson.

== Reception ==
No.	Title	Air date	Ratings/Share (18–49)	Viewers (millions)	DVR 18-49	DVR Viewers (millions)	Total 18-49	Total Viewers (millions)
1	"Surrender Benson"	September 25, 2013	2.7/7	9.58	1.1	2.85	3.8	12.43
2	"Imprisoned Lives"	September 25, 2013	2.7/7	9.58	1.1	2.85	3.8	12.43
3	"American Tragedy"	October 2, 2013	2.0/6	6.85		2.61		9.46
4	"Internal Affairs"	October 9, 2013	1.6/4	6.31	0.7	2.57	2.6	8.89
5	"Wonderland Story"	October 16, 2013	1.8/5	7.48				
6	"October Surprise"	October 23, 2013	1.4/4	5.53	1.0	2.58	2.4	8.11
7	"Dissonant Voices"	November 6, 2013	1.5/4	5.65	1.1	2.67	2.6	8.32
8	"Military Justice"	November 13, 2013	1.6/4	6.16		2.53		8.69
9	"Rapist Anonymous"	November 20, 2013	1.6/4	5.97	0.9	2.40	2.5	8.38
10	"Psycho/Therapist"	January 8, 2014	2.1/6	8.81	1.1	2.84	3.2	11.69
11	"Amaro's One-Eighty"	January 15, 2014	1.4/4	5.44		2.57		8.03
12	"Jersey Breakdown"	January 22, 2014	1.8/5	6.68	1.0	2.69	2.8	9.37
13	"Betrayal's Climax"	January 29, 2014	2.0/5	7.59	1.0	2.75	3.0	10.34
14	"Wednesday's Child"	February 5, 2014	1.8/5	6.24	1.1	2.62	2.9	8.89
15	"Comic Perversion"	February 26, 2014	2.0/6	7.78	1.1	2.95	3.1	10.73
16	"Gridiron Soldier"	March 5, 2014	1.6/4	6.01				
17	"Gambler's Fallacy"	March 12, 2014	1.6/5	6.28				
18	"Criminal Stories"	March 19, 2014	1.5/5	5.82				
19	"Downloaded Child"	April 2, 2014	1.7/5	5.90				
20	"Beast's Obsession"	April 9, 2014	2.1/6	7.41				
21	"Post-Mortem Blues"	April 30, 2014	1.8/5	6.20				
22	"Reasonable Doubt"	May 7, 2014	1.5/4	5.34				
23	"Thought Criminal"	May 14, 2014	1.6/5	5.42				
24	"Spring Awakening"	May 21, 2014	1.6/5	6.39				
