= Erin Lindsay =

Fictional character

- Chicago P.D. character
- Erin Lindsay
- First appearance: CF: "Rhymes with Shout" November 26, 2013; CPD: "Stepping Stone"; January 8, 2014
- Last appearance: CPD: "Fork in the Road"; May 17, 2017
- Created by: Matt Olmstead
- Portrayed by: Sophia Bush
- Other appearances: SVU: "Chicago Crossover"; November 12, 2014

In-universe information
- Gender: Female
- Occupation: Special Agent, FBI New York Counterterrorism Bureau; Detective, CPD (former); Officer, DEA task force (former)
- Family: Barbara "Bunny" Fletcher (mother); Teddy Courtney (half-brother); Hank Voight (foster father); Camille Voight (foster mother; deceased); Justin Voight (foster brother; deceased)
- Significant others: Jay Halstead (also ex-partner); Kelly Severide
- Nationality: American
- Date of birth: April 11, 1985

Police career
- Department: Chicago Police Department: Intelligence Unit (CF & CPD: S1); Patrol (pre-series)
- Years of service: 2007 – 2017
- Rank: Junior Detective
- Badge No.: 51317

Erin Lindsay is a fictional character from NBC's Chicago TV franchise, as a lead character in Chicago P.D. and a recurring character in Law & Order: Special Victims Unit, Chicago Fire and Chicago Med. Portrayed by Sophia Bush, she was introduced as a detective in the Intelligence Unit of the Chicago Police Department.

== Background and characterization ==
In season 1 of Chicago P.D., it has been established from the very beginning that Lindsay shared a special relationship with Hank Voight, head of the Intelligence Unit. Her unwavering loyalty to Voight is explained as her background is gradually revealed. She is generally unfazed by the gangsters, drug lords, and physically intimidating suspects the unit encounter on a regular basis. She has mentioned that her stepfather was in prison and that he would hit her and her mother, Bunny, who was an on-and-off drug addict. Through Bunny, she has a half-brother, Teddy Courtney, who was taken by a child sex ring at age 13 and was found by NYPD detectives ten years later working as a prostitute. Lindsay grew up on the street, and by the age of 14, she had already been arrested five times on charges including misdemeanor, simple battery, retail theft, solicitation, and unlawful possession of cannabis. She became a confidential informant for Voight, who, along with his wife, eventually took her in as her legal guardians.

Actress Sophia Bush described the character: "Lindsay comes from the street so she already knows how all these people work." She completed high school at St. Ignatius College Prep and joined the Chicago Police Department. After graduating from the police academy, she spent four years on the west side of Chicago as a patrol officer, which she said was all the education she needed.

Because of her background, Lindsay is compassionate and sympathetic towards vulnerable young victims, especially girls, as she can relate with their situation. For example, she tries to get a 17-year-old prostitute and heroin addict, Nadia, to enter drug rehab twice. Eventually, she succeeds in convincing Nadia to stay clean and helps her get a desk job at 21st District headquarters.

== Character arc ==
=== Chicago Fire ===
The character was first introduced in Chicago Fire, as one of the Chicago PD detectives the firefighters of 51 regularly come into contact with. She began a relationship with Kelly Severide, the lieutenant of Squad 3. They eventually break up when he spirals out of control following Leslie Shay's death.

=== Chicago P.D. ===
When Chicago P.D. premiered, it was established that she has been partnered with Jay Halstead for the past month. The first season coincided with the second season of Chicago Fire, during which she was still dating Lieutenant Kelly Severide from Squad 3.

In season 2, Lindsay was recruited for a DEA task force. In the episode "Disco Bob", Lindsay becomes disillusioned with the task force, with its seemingly-endless bureaucracy and the menial tasks her handler assigned to her (she was to spend a number of weeks with the target's girlfriend, simultaneously pumping her for information and keeping her out of the task force's way), leading her to resign and return to the Chicago PD and Intelligence.

Lindsay's spiral downward begins with Nadia Decotis' death in the Law & Order: Special Victims Unit crossover episode "Daydream Believer". Nadia is murdered by serial killer Greg Yates, who had intended to target Lindsay. With this knowledge, Lindsay feels responsible for Nadia's death. She begins drinking and becomes addicted to painkillers, enabled by her ne'er-do-well mother Bunny. In the season 2 finale "Born into Bad News", she turns in her badge and resigns; it is revealed in season 3 that Voight actually filed for a three-week sabbatical on her behalf instead of accepting a resignation. She returns in the season 3 premiere after learning that Halstead's undercover operation had been compromised and that he was being held hostage and tortured by a drug kingpin wanted by the Chicago PD. She gets sober, moves back in with Voight, and cuts Bunny out of her life as part of Voight's conditions for returning to Intelligence.

Since breaking up with Severide, Lindsay's main love interest in the show is her partner Jay Halstead. They share a close friendship, which has escalated to a more intimate relationship and cooled down at various times, due to Voight's vocal dislike for "in-house" romances. However, regardless of the status of their relationship, they remained loyal to each other as partners on the job and friends outside of it. Halstead is the only character other than Voight she has confided her past to in detail; likewise, she is the only character other than Mouse and Halstead's brother Will who knows about his traumatic past in the military. When Lindsay was on the federal task force, she starts seeing Halstead after work as they no longer had to worry about breaking fraternization rules. In the season 3 premiere, Halstead is the only one who persistently tries to help her, even after Voight had given up. Following her return from her "sabbatical", Voight tells Halstead that he accepts his relationship with Lindsay as long as he is looking out for her. After some hesitation, she agrees to take the next step, and they go public with their relationship for the first time by kissing at Molly's. In the beginning of season four, they move in together.

In "Army of One", she sticks her gun down a pedophile's throat in the interrogation room when a child is discovered to be found missing (and later found dead). In "Fork In The Road", she is brought to the review board when she was accused of assault.

She leaves Chicago in "Fork in the Road" to join the FBI's New York Counter-terrorism Bureau in exchange for her mother's freedom after she is found in possession of pills that were stolen by her boyfriend and his associates.

In "Chasing Monsters", Olinsky lets Lindsay know that the body of Kevin Bingham has resurfaced. In "Breaking Point", a witness identifies Olinsky and Lindsay as having been digging near the site where the body was found.

=== Partners ===
- Detective Jay Halstead (Seasons 1–4)
- Detective Hailey Upton (Season 4, episodes 22–23)

== Crossover appearances ==
In addition to her regular role on P.D., Lindsay has appeared in Special Victims Unit, Fire, and Med.

- Chicago Fire (season 2) –
  - "Rhymes With Shout" (November 26, 2013)
  - "Tonight's The Night" (January 21, 2014)
  - "Virgin Skin" (February 25, 2014)
  - "Keep Your Mouth Shut" (March 4, 2014)
  - "A Rocket Blasting Off" (March 11, 2014)
  - "A Dark Day (1)" (April 29, 2014)
  - "Real Never Waits" (May 13, 2014)
- Chicago Fire (season 3)
  - "Wow Me" (September 30, 2014)
  - "Nobody Touches Anything" (November 11, 2014)
- Chicago Fire – "Some Make It, Some Don't" (January 3, 2017)
- Chicago Fire – "Deathtrap" (March 1, 2017)
- Law & Order: Special Victims Unit – "Comic Perversions" (February 26, 2014)
- Law & Order: Special Victims Unit – "Chicago Crossover" (November 12, 2014)
- Law & Order: Special Victims Unit – "Daydream Believer" (April 29, 2015)
- Law & Order: Special Victims Unit – "Nationwide Manhunt" (February 10, 2016)
- Chicago Med – "Mistaken" (December 8, 2015)
- Chicago Med – "Malignant" (January 5, 2016)
- Chicago Med – "Alternative Medicine" (October 27, 2016)
- Chicago Med – "Inherent Bias" (November 3, 2016)
- Chicago Med – "Free Will" (November 10, 2016)
- Chicago Med – "Prisoner's Dilemma" (March 9, 2017)
- Chicago Justice – "Tycoon" (May 14, 2017)
