= Chicago P.D. season 1 =

Chicago P.D.
- Season 1
- Chicago P.D. Season 1 DVD cover
- Showrunner: Matt Olmstead
- No. of episodes: 15

Release
- Original network: NBC
- Original release: January 8 – May 21, 2014

Season chronology
- Next → Season 2

The first season of Chicago P.D. aired on NBC from January 8, 2014, at 10:00 p.m. EST, to May 21, 2014. The season consisted of 15 episodes.

== Production ==
On March 27, 2013, it was reported that NBC was considering plans for a spin-off of Chicago Fire. Deadline revealed that the proposed spin-off would involve the Chicago Police Department, and would be created and executive produced by Dick Wolf, Derek Haas, Michael Brandt, and Matt Olmstead.

On May 10, 2013, NBC picked up the proposed spin-off, now titled Chicago P.D., for the 2013–14 United States network television schedule. On October 18, the series was given a premiere date of January 8, 2014.

On January 31, 2014, NBC ordered two additional episodes of Chicago P.D., bringing the total number of episodes for the first season to fifteen.

== Casting ==
Tania Raymonde was cast in the planned series as an Officer named Nicole. Kelly Blatz, the lead-actor of Disney XD's Aaron Stone, was also cast as a young but seasoned Officer Elam. Scott Eastwood was set to portray Officer Jim Barnes. Eastwood also co-starred with Tania Raymonde in Texas Chainsaw 3D. Melissa Sagemiller would portray Detective Willhite, a member of the Chicago P.D. Intelligence Unit. LaRoyce Hawkins, in the role of Officer Kevin Atwater, was the only Chicago-area actor originally cast in May. These characters were introduced in the penultimate episodes of Chicago Fire's first season.

Sagemiller's character was dropped after her initial guest spot on Chicago Fire and in the first episode of Chicago P.D.. Jesse Lee Soffer, who already had a recurring role on Chicago Fire as undercover cop Detective Jay Halstead, was added to the main cast in her place. Jason Beghe was cast as Sergeant of the Intelligence Unit Hank Voight and Jon Seda would play the role of Intelligence Unit Detective Antonio Dawson. Patrick Flueger and One Tree Hill star Sophia Bush joined the cast as Officer Adam Ruzek and Detective Erin Lindsay respectively. Marina Squerciati joined the cast in the role of Officer Kim Burgess. Elias Koteas became a member of the main cast and would play Intelligence Unit Detective Alvin Olinsky. Archie Kao was later announced to be playing Sheldon Jin, a tech-expert working with the Intelligence Unit. Stella Maeve was cast in the recurring role of playing Nadia, a pretty 18-year-old escort who is addicted to heroin and goes through a very difficult withdrawal. Both Eastwood and Raymonde, like Sagemiller, departed the series and would no longer be a part of the show's main cast. Sydney Tamiia Poitier was to guest star in five episodes as a Detective, who would eventually crossover on to the parent series, Chicago Fire.

=== Regular ===
- Jason Beghe as Sergeant Henry "Hank" Voight
- Jon Seda as Detective Antonio Dawson
- Sophia Bush as Detective Erin Lindsay
- Jesse Lee Soffer as Detective Jay Halstead
- Patrick John Flueger as Officer Adam Ruzek
- Marina Squerciati as Officer Kim Burgess
- LaRoyce Hawkins as Officer Kevin Atwater
- Archie Kao as Officer Sheldon Jin
- Elias Koteas as Detective Alvin Olinsky

=== Recurring ===
- Amy Morton as Desk Sergeant Trudy Platt
- Robert Wisdom as Commander Ron Perry
- Kurt Naebig as Lt. Bruce Belden
- America Olivo as Laura Dawson
- Josh Segarra as Justin Voight
- Robin Weigert as Erica Gradishar
- Emily Peterson as Wendy
- Stella Maeve as Nadia Decotis
- Alina Jenine Taber as Lexi Olinsky
- David Aron Damane as Maurice Owens
- Gabriel Ellis as Gustav Munoz
- Ian Bohen as Sergeant Edwin Stillwell
- Sydney Tamiia Poitier as Detective Mia Sumner
- Arturo Del Puerto as Andres "Pulpo" Diaz
- Matthew Sherbach as Lonnie Rodiger
- Don Forston as Phil Rodiger
- Billy Wirth as Charlie Pugliese

=== Crossover characters ===
- Taylor Kinney as Lieutenant Kelly Severide
- Monica Raymund as Paramedic Gabriela Dawson
- Lauren German as Paramedic Leslie Shay
- David Eigenberg as Firefighter Christopher Herrmann
- Charlie Barnett as Firefighter Peter Mills
- Yuri Sardarov as Firefighter Brian "Otis" Zvonecek
- Jesse Spencer as Lieutenant Matthew Casey
- Eamonn Walker as Battalion Chief Wallace Boden
- Joe Minoso as Firefighter Joe Cruz
- Ice-T as Detective Odafin "Fin" Tutuola
- Kelli Giddish as Detective Amanda Rollins

== Episodes ==
No. overall	No. in season	Title	Directed by	Written by	Original release date	Prod. code	U.S. viewers (millions)
1	1	"Stepping Stone"	Michael Slovis	Matt Olmstead	January 8, 2014	101	8.59
Sergeant Hank Voight of the elite Intelligence Unit at CPD 21st District and his team of detectives investigate brutal slayings by an assassin who is linked to a group of Colombian drug dealers. Veteran undercover Detective Alvin Olinsky recruits Officer Adam Ruzek from the Police Academy, having worked with his father years before. Detectives Antonio Dawson and Julie 'Jules' Willhite (Melissa Sagemiller) head inside the suspect's address first, unaware that "Pulpo" may be inside. Trying to warn Willhite and Dawson is no use, and Willhite is shot in the neck, later dying from her injuries, news Detective Erin Lindsay tells Hank of during a phone call. Voight returns to the precinct and immediately fights Lieutenant Bruce Belden at the district, forcing other officers to intervene, physically restrain and separate the two men. After the suspect is in custody, Antonio receives a phone call from his wife, Laura, informing him their young son, Diego, who has been working at a bakery his mother owns, has been kidnapped. This episode is included on the Chicago Fire Season 2 DVD set.
2	2	"Wrong Side of the Bars"	Joe Chappelle	Michael Brandt & Derek Haas	January 15, 2014	102	5.50
When Antonio's son Diego's kidnappers demand the release of the drug lord "Pulpo", the Intelligence Unit uses all its resources to find the boy as Antonio struggles with his emotions. Detective Jay Halstead discovers fellow Detective Erin Lindsay's file and her past, including her relationship with Voight. Antonio considers making a deal with the kidnappers, but backs out. The Unit tracks the kidnapper to a bus terminal. When the kidnapper is trapped on board he tries to use Diego as leverage to escape, but Ruzek drives another bus into the vehicle, forcing the kidnapper to let go of the boy. Antonio kills the kidnapper as Erin catches Diego. They later attend Detective Willhite's funeral.
3	3	"Chin Check"	Sanford Bookstaver	David Hoselton	January 22, 2014	103	6.24
During a stakeout at a house, a dealer is gunned down and Ruzek shoots the killer. Inside, the Intelligence Unit discovers armor-piercing bullets that trace to several homicides, stolen from Canada and being sold in Chicago. Olinsky goes undercover and finds a stack of illegally imported guns. Halstead confronts some unwelcome people from his past. Erin consoles Kelly Severide when his sister is missing after his run-in with a criminal. Al reminds Ruzek that it is mandatory to see a counselor following his first shooting of a criminal. This convinces Ruzek to finally reveal to his fiancée what he has really been doing on the job since he got pulled out of the Police Academy. Laura tells Antonio she wants to meet his informant, Jasmine. Thinking Laura is jealous, Antonio sets it up to reassure his wife, but Laura actually wants to thank Jasmine personally for helping to save Diego. Voight's son Justin gets out of jail and when Erin goes alone to pick him up, he tries to kiss her. Voight works to help a young informant escape a Chicago gang.
4	4	"Now Is Always Temporary"	Mark Tinker	Denitria Harris-Lawrence	January 29, 2014	104	6.89
The Intelligence Unit handles an intense hostage situation when an artist takes a call girl at gunpoint before taking his own life. The call girl tells Erin about a prostitute named Nadia Decotis who reveals the location of another dead body, in exchange for a hit. Erin receives more information from Nadia and helps her get sober. Erin later stops in the middle of the road and begins to break down, shedding more light on her history. Meanwhile, Officers Kevin Atwater and Kim Burgess are assigned to convince a hoarder to clean her house or face charges. During their second attempt, Atwater and Burgess discover a child being held captive. Olinsky learns that his daughter, Lexi, was holding a handful of joints for her boyfriend. Halstead reveals the reason why he holds a grudge against the father and son he accosted before: years prior, the son, Lonnie Rodiger, raped and murdered the younger brother of Halstead's high school girlfriend, but was acquitted at trial when his father, Phil, perjured his son's alibi. Voight's son Justin gets into a bar fight and the problems between father and son worsen.
5	5	"Thirty Balloons"	Karen Gaviola	Craig Gore & Tim Walsh	February 5, 2014	105	6.00
Officers Atwater and Burgess get a new patrol car, with a warning from Platt that the car must be in the same condition at the end of their shift, as the District 21 Commander Ron Perry is looking to use the vehicle as a show car. However, during their trip, a crazed, bloodied woman wandering the streets attacks Atwater with a broken glass bottle, and in the process damages the patrol car. When the crazed and bloodied woman is taken to a hospital, it is discovered she suffered a cocaine-induced psychotic break thanks to one of thirty balloons of cocaine hidden in her stomach bursting. The Intelligence Unit discovers a drug-smuggling operation involving these balloons and the woman's three partners who are also drug mules. Olinsky and Ruzek go on a stakeout and watch the dealers take the other two mules. Before alerting the team, Ruzek goes in against Olinsky's orders and ends up saving the mules and getting the dealers arrested. Lindsay attempts to keep Justin out of trouble when Voight finds out about the rap sheet of one of Justin's supposed "friends". Voight and Lindsay decide to save Justin by any means possible.
6	6	"Conventions"	Alik Sakharov	Maisha Closson	February 26, 2014	106	8.00
Special Victims Unit Detectives Tutuola (Ice-T) and Rollins (Kelli Giddish) come to Chicago to assist Voight and Antonio in the investigation of a serial rapist and murderer that cuts off the ears of their victims, matching the same pattern seen in New York that SVU detectives have investigated in the past. They find a victim that has survived another attack. Burgess, on her own investigation without notifying anyone in the unit, reveals that a man went to a drug store and was identified as Neil Vance. Meanwhile, Erin asks Halstead to go undercover as her extremely successful fiancée at her high school graduation and reveals her past to him going back to when she was a CI for Voight, who took her in when she was living on the streets. After returning from the reunion, Erin receives a visit from Hank's son Justin who has blood on his hands. This episode concludes a crossover with Law & Order: Special Victims Unit that begins on "Comic Perversion".
7	7	"The Price We Pay"	Mark Tinker	Michael Brandt & Derek Haas	March 5, 2014	107	6.05
Justin, with blood on his hands, tells Erin that he was in a bar fight, but he was actually a reluctant accomplice to the murder of a man with major mob connections. Voight figures out that the murder was committed by Joe Catalano, the nephew of another mob boss. Antonio tells Voight that Voight's Internal Affairs contact Gradishar came to him, wanting him to make a deal with her for evidence on Voight in return for him being promoted to Head of Intelligence. Catalano is found dead in the Chicago River at night. Antonio tells Gradishar that he will not help her build a case against Voight. Gradishar does not remember that Antonio was the partner of an officer who had mistakenly billed excessive overtime pay. She took a hard line against Antonio's partner, which caused him to lose his job and his pension; this partner later killed himself. Voight, Erin, and Jin conspire to keep Justin's name out of official police records regarding the case, and then Voight drops him off at an Army Recruitment office. Also in this episode, Platt takes photographs for updated ID badges, and she deliberately takes bad photos of Burgess and Atwater. Ruzek, apparently developing a bond with Burgess, helps the two patrol officers blackmail Platt into taking new photos.
8	8	"Different Mistakes"	Fred Berner	Bryan Garcia	March 12, 2014	108	5.84
Voight and the Intelligence Unit investigate a massacre at an illegal Triad gambling den in Chinatown by professional gunmen. Olinsky has Ruzek work on patrol with Burgess, Olinsky believing Ruzek hasn't gone through the whole process of appreciating being in the Intelligence unit while Atwater goes to work with Intelligence. As they investigate, an undercover points a gun at Halstead and tells him to leave. It emerges that the cop is Jimmy Shi (Mark Dacascos), Voight's former partner from the Gang Unit, who is now running a Vice Squad in Chinatown. The Intelligence Unit suspect Shi and his crew committed the crimes. They follow him but learn that Shi has been undercover for 11 years and that someone is trying to frame him. Meanwhile, Halstead has Jin investigate Lonnie Rodiger and later suspects Lonnie is planning another sick crime. Ruzek and Burgess attend a burglary and Ruzek is nearly stabbed. Voight deals with a new IA contact who seriously mistrusts him and Detective Mia Sumner joins Intelligence. Erin also tries to help drug-addicted Nadia get clean, but she relapses. Voight meets with Maurice, who hands Voight money and tells him that he needs a shipment of drugs coming in protected. As soon as Voight takes the cash, several police cars converge on them; Voight is cuffed and put into the back of a police car.
9	9	"A Material Witness"	Sanford Bookstaver	Michael Batistick	March 19, 2014	109	5.74
A gang shooting is witnessed by Olinsky's daughter, Lexi. Worried that she will become a likely target if she testifies, Voight takes the case from the Gang Unit even though the Gang Unit Detective protests and looks for a likely suspect responsible for the shooting; a gang member named Calaca involved with a gang known as the Latin Priests. But, when four members of the Latin Priests are found executed, this triggers an all-out gang war with a rival gang. Ruzek decides to enlist the help of Officer Burgess, without getting Voight's authorization, making her go undercover as a tourist in Millennium Park following numerous cell phones being reported stolen and then handed over to the Latin Priests. When Burgess and Ruzek's phone gets stolen however it leads the team back to the same location; the home of an elderly woman who fostered the child who had stolen Burgess' phone earlier. The lady gives the Intelligence Unit the whereabouts of where Calaca might be. Lexi makes the decision to identify him in a line-up. As Ruzek and Voight bring him to a police car, Calaca implies he might target Lexi, resulting in Voight slamming Calaca against the car's bonnet and informing the other man there's not in a cellblock in five states that doesn't have someone who owns Voight a favor and if anything happens to Lexi, Voight will have Calaca's new boyfriend turn him inside out for a stick of gum. Later, Voight later responds to a call from his current Internal Affairs contact, Stillwell, that the body of Lonnie Rodiger has been found. Stillwell warns Voight that Halstead's obsession with the man will put him on the firing line.
10	10	"At Least It's Justice"	Michael Slovis	Craig Gore & Tim Walsh	April 2, 2014	110	5.75
After learning that Halstead was following Rodieger the night before, Voight and Commander Perry suspend him, stripping him of his badge and firearm. Antonio, refusing to believe that Halstead committed the crime, secretly passes the case files on the murder to him. Meanwhile, the Intelligence Unit investigates the murder of a doctor who helped put many criminals in prison. Fireman Kelly Severide identifies the driver of the car, but the man is later found dead by the team in a vat of hydrochloric acid. With one man down, Voight reluctantly allows Detective Mia Sumner to prove herself. During a sting operation to catch a gang leader responsible for these murders, a local cop car botches the entire operation. This leads to a shootout at a nearby Gun Show, which ends with one officer being killed and the suspect getting away. Sumner's informant tells her that the suspect has a meth lab in a trucking yard. Meanwhile, with Olinsky helping him analyze the timetable of events, Halstead finds out that Lonnie's murderer was in fact his own father, Phil, who had realized that his son was a pedophile. Halstead later visits the grave of one of Lonnie's victims to pay his respects. Finally, Severide goes to Erin's apartment to return an ornamental hand grenade that he had taken from her. They share a kiss, before Severide tells her he will see her around.
11	11	"Turn the Light Off"	Nick Gomez	David Hoselton	April 9, 2014	111	6.49
A high-scale bank robbery ends with $8 million is stolen and multiple deaths. Lukas Perko, a witness, recognizes one of the robbers is part of a Croatian gang. The Intelligence Unit conclude a rival gang is cleaning up loose ends in the city. When Perko's car is torched in broad daylight, Voight and Dawson pay a visit to the man's convicted brother who claims to have planned the whole robbery. Getting a lead on a member of the Latin Kings’ involvement, the team plans an undercover operation. Burgess offers to work undercover as a high-end hooker. Nadia, the girl Erin is trying to help get clean, is drafted in to work alongside her. Nadia had been clean for one month, but has to snort cocaine to save herself and Burgess's cover being blown. Burgess is caught by one of the men. Voight and Olinsky resort to violence of their very own to get the location of the $8 million. But even after the money is found and the gang member is behind bars, Commander Perry still isn’t happy about losing Gustav Muñoz, especially after his promises to give him the infamous criminal Pulpo.
12	12	"8:30 PM"	Mark Tinker	Story by : Dick Wolf & Matt Olmstead; Teleplay by : Michael Brandt & Derek Haas	April 30, 2014	112	7.28
Voight and the Intelligence Unit investigate the bombing of Chicago Medical Hospital. Burgess still anxiously awaits the fate of her niece Zoe, who is in dire need of a new liver. She and Atwater tend to the collapsed paramedic Leslie Shay with Dr. Holly Thelan (Amanda Righetti) taking charge of her care. Holly learns that her half-sister Imogene has no brain activity. Jin identifies the owner of the bombs as Paul Watts, who is found murdered. After going over known associates, Olinsky recognizes one of them as he interviewed him earlier. The man holds Erin hostage, but she is saved by firefighters Peter Mills and Joe Cruz. Voight and Olinsky learn that the mastermind behind the bombing is Ted Powell, a known player in the anti-government fringe movement who is seeking revenge on the Chicago Police and Chicago Fire Departments over the death of his mother and the arrest of his racist father which occurred during a siege at the family farm ten years ago. They learn that Powell planted a bomb hidden in a van near Police Headquarters. The Intelligence Unit track Powell down and Voight threatens to throw him off the roof, only to relent when the bomb is disarmed. Dr. Arrata (Dylan Baker) operates on Zoe using Imogene's liver (they both share the same blood type) and the operation is a success. This episode concludes a crossover with Chicago Fire that begins on "A Dark Day". It is included on the Chicago Fire Season 2 DVD set.
13	13	"My Way"	Karen Gaviola	Matt Olmstead & Michael Batistick	May 7, 2014	113	5.39
As Gustav Muñoz continues his series of murders, Commander Perry is displeased by the lack of cooperation between Voight and Violent Crimes Lieutenant Bruce Belden. He orders them to bring in Pulpo to help capture Muñoz, much to the chagrin of the Intelligence Unit. As they reluctantly meet Pulpo's demands, Antonio goes undercover as a friend to meet up with Muñoz, but the location turns out to be a ruse and Muñoz kills two more Ukrainian mobsters. The Intelligence Unit realizes that Pulpo has used them again and discover that Pulpo has a secret family, a girlfriend and a young son. Voight uses this opportunity to threaten Pulpo with the arrest of his wife and putting his son into foster care. Pulpo caves in and says Muñoz will be targeting a high-level figure at a festival in Uptown Chicago, in exchange for him getting to say goodbye to his wife and son before he is sent to prison. Meanwhile, Ruzek's fiancée Wendy calls off their engagement, claiming that his job in Intelligence has changed him. Erin receives an unwelcomed visit from a former friend, Charlie Pugliese, and Voight tells her not to let Charlie back in her life. Jin is revealed to be the reluctant informant working for Stillwell. Antonio and Belden bring in Pulpo's girlfriend and son to say goodbye, only for the wife to help Pulpo, who shoots Antonio, Belden and two other officers and escapes.
14	14	"The Docks"	Nick Gomez	Craig Gore & Tim Walsh	May 14, 2014	114	6.06
In the aftermath of the shooting that killed Lieutenant Bruce Belden and two other officers, Antonio is left badly wounded and is in critical condition at the hospital. The manhunt for Pulpo is the Intelligence Unit's priority, now more than ever. Voight, seeking revenge on Pulpo for killing Willhite and shooting at Antonio, tells his team to have the drug lord delivered to him and Olinsky, which makes Halstead feel uncomfortable. The Intelligence Unit decides to use Pulpo's lawyer, who reveals that Pulpo needs someone who can make fake IDs and refers them to an old client of the man, who has made fake IDs for the drug lord and his family many times before. When Pulpo's wife's fake ID comes onto their radar at a gas station, the Intelligence Unit finds her and her son, but no sign of Pulpo and realizes that Pulpo used them as a diversion to throw them off the trail. The Intelligence Unit learns that Pulpo has some Russian contacts that were willing to help. Firefighter Brian "Otis" Zvonecek translates the Russian language on Pulpo's computer and learns that the Russians agreed to smuggle him out of the country inside a shipping container. Pulpo is captured and Voight and Olinsky head out to the docks to kill him. Halstead, knowing what Voight and Olinsky intend to do, tells a recovering Antonio that Voight has Pulpo. Antonio says that they might be at the docks. During the intense confrontation at the docks, Halstead convinces the two that Pulpo will have his day in court. Jin reluctantly cooperates with Stillwell and uses Sumner as a scapegoat, which causes Voight to fire her and replace her with Atwater. Stillwell is revealed to have a hold on Jin because of threatening him and his father with being deported, using Jin's father's large gambling debts as a way of accelerating this process. Erin is forced to face her former 'friend' Charlie and tries to find out what he is planning to do, having turned up in Chicago after all these years.
15	15	"A Beautiful Friendship"	Mark Tinker	Story by : Michael Batistick; Teleplay by : Michael Brandt & Derek Haas	May 21, 2014	115	6.27
Erin is at a crossroads with Charlie Pugliese who has leverage against her and her best friend, Annie. Antonio returns to work earlier than expected and has an argument with his wife Laura on his cell. The Intelligence Unit investigates the theft of some water gel explosives, as well as finding a dead security guard at a Chicago construction site. After finding a tip from the CI, Halstead and Ruzek finds out that Pugliese is connected to it. They help new Intelligence Unit member Atwater on another sting operation that reveals the man behind the construction site robbery and the name Kevin "Red" Radner. Charlie's involvement appears to run deeper than they first thought. After Halstead encourages her to come clean about Charlie, Erin reveals to Voight about what happened. Once the squad arrests Charlie and the others and finds the explosives, Charlie tries to report a murder that implicates both Erin and her childhood friend Annie. But Erin threatens Charlie to lie about the murder to protect Annie and appeals to him by offering him a future with his son, Annie's child, Travis. Charlie recants and reveals that Red was the one who killed the guard and that his hideout is in another warehouse. Nadia remembers her days as a prostitute in this warehouse, having come to the Intelligence Unit and Erin following her having been clean for one whole month. Voight learns that Jin was the one who has been informing Stillwell and confronts him about it. After Jin reveals that Stillwell leveraged him on his father, he lets him go but it's clear he still holds a dangerous grudge. Antonio comes home and finds out that Laura has left him, taking their children with her. Burgess works with an uninterested partner, following Atwater's promotion and requests a better partner at once. Ruzek comes to Burgess's apartment to support her, after losing her shot at making it in the Intelligence Unit, largely because of her involvement with Ruzek, which Voight was not keen on having in his Unit. Things escalate as Ruzek and Burgess kiss and start to make out. The very next day, Voight arrives to find his Internal Affairs contact, Stillwell who's standing by the dead body of Sheldon Jin.

== Ratings ==
The series premiere was watched by 8.59 million viewers and achieved a 2.0/6 Adults 18–49 rating with the DVR ratings reaching 11 million. The season concluded on May 21 with 6.27 million, averaging the first season with 8.03 million viewers per episode.

=== Live + 7 Day (DVR) ratings ===
No. in series	No. in season	Episode	Air date	Time slot (EST)	Rating/share (18–49)	Viewers (millions) increase	Total viewers (millions)	Ref
1	1	"Stepping Stone"	January 8, 2014	Wednesdays; 10:00pm	2.0/6	2.41	11.00	
2	2	"Wrong Side of the Bars"	January 15, 2014	Wednesdays; 10:00pm	1.5/4	8.50	14.00	
3	3	"Chin Check"	January 22, 2014	Wednesdays; 10:00pm	1.6/5	4.90	11.40	
4	4	"Now Is Always Temporary"	January 29, 2014	Wednesdays; 10:00pm	1.7/5	4.00	10.89	
5	5	"Thirty Balloons"	February 5, 2014	Wednesdays; 10:00pm	1.7/5	5.40	11.40	
6	6	"Conventions"	February 26, 2014	Wednesdays; 10:00pm	2.2/5	5.60	13.60	
7	7	"The Price We Pay"	March 5, 2014	Wednesdays; 10:00pm	1.5/5	3.70	9.75	
8	8	"Different Mistakes"	March 12, 2014	Wednesdays; 10:00pm	1.6/5	5.84	8.45	
9	9	"A Material Witness"	March 19, 2014	Wednesdays; 10:00pm	1.4/4	5.74	8.56	
10	10	"At Least It's Justice"	April 2, 2014	Wednesdays; 10:00pm	1.6/5	5.74	8.63	
11	11	"Turn Off the Light"	April 9, 2014	Wednesdays; 10:00pm	1.6/5	6.48	9.18	
12	12	"8:30 PM"	April 30, 2014	Wednesdays; 10:00pm	1.9/6	7.28	10.90	
13	13	"My Way"	May 7, 2014	Wednesdays; 10:00pm	1.4/4	5.39	8.22	
14	14	"My Docks"	May 14, 2014	Wednesdays; 10:00pm	1.5/5	2.89	8.84	
15	15	"A Beautiful Friendship"	May 21, 2014	Wednesdays; 10:00pm	1.6/5	-	-	

== DVD release ==
The DVD release of season one was released after the season had completed its original television broadcast. The DVD release features bonus material such as audio commentaries on some episodes from the creator and cast, deleted scenes, gag reels and behind-the-scenes featurettes.

The Complete First Season
Set details			Special features
15 episodes; 630 minutes (Region 1); 4-disc set; 1.78:1 aspect ratio; Languages: English (Dolby Digital 2.0 Surround); Subtitles: English (Region 1)			Chicago Fire Episode "A Dark Day" - The beginning of a two-part crossover event; "Professional Courtesy" - Bonus Episode from Chicago Fire: Season One
Release dates			Chicago Fire Episode "A Dark Day" - The beginning of a two-part crossover event; "Professional Courtesy" - Bonus Episode from Chicago Fire: Season One
United States	United Kingdom	Australia	Chicago Fire Episode "A Dark Day" - The beginning of a two-part crossover event; "Professional Courtesy" - Bonus Episode from Chicago Fire: Season One
September 2, 2014	April 27, 2015	April 2, 2015	Chicago Fire Episode "A Dark Day" - The beginning of a two-part crossover event; "Professional Courtesy" - Bonus Episode from Chicago Fire: Season One
