= Chicago Med season 1 =

Chicago Med
- Season 1
- Chicago Med Season 1 DVD cover
- Showrunners: Andrew Dettmann; Andrew Schneider; Diane Frolov
- No. of episodes: 18

Release
- Original network: NBC
- Original release: November 17, 2015 – May 17, 2016

Season chronology
- Next → Season 2

The first season of Chicago Med, an American medical drama television series with executive producer Dick Wolf, and producers Michael Brandt, Peter Jankowski, Andrew Schneider and René Balcer, premiered on November 17, 2015 and concluded on May 17, 2016. The season consisted of 18 episodes.

== Plot ==
Chicago Med focuses on the emergency department at Gaffney Chicago Medical Center and on its doctors and nurses as they work to save patients' lives.

== Cast ==
=== Main ===
- Nick Gehlfuss as Dr. Will Halstead, chief resident
- Torrey DeVitto as Dr. Natalie Manning
- Yaya DaCosta as April Sexton
- Rachel DiPillo as Sarah Reese
- Colin Donnell as Dr. Connor Rhodes
- Brian Tee as Lieutenant Commander Dr. Ethan Choi
- S. Epatha Merkerson as Sharon Goodwin, chief of services
- Oliver Platt as Dr. Daniel Charles
- Marlyne Barrett as Maggie Lockwood, RN, emergency department charge nurse

=== Recurring ===
- Julie Berman as Dr. Samantha "Sam" Zanetti
- Brennan Brown as Dr. Sam Abrams
- Peter Mark Kendall as Joey Thomas
- D. W. Moffett as Cornelius Rhodes
- Christina Brucato as Claire Rhodes
- Annie Potts as Helen Manning
- Gregg Henry as Dr. David Downey
- Susie Abromeit as Zoe Roth
- Roland Buck III as Noah Sexton
- Marc Grapey as Peter Kalmick
- Cynthia Addai-Robinson as Dr. Vicki Glass
- Lorena Diaz as Nurse Doris
- Amanda Marcheschi as Nurse Dina
- Patti Murin as Dr. Nina Shore
- Jeremy Shouldis as Dr. Marty Peterson, an anesthesiologist at Gaffney

=== Guest ===
- Jeff Hephner as Jeff Clarke

=== Crossover characters ===
- Jesse Lee Soffer as Detective Jay Halstead
- Sophia Bush as Detective Erin Lindsay
- Brian Geraghty as Officer Sean Roman
- Marina Squerciati as Officer Kim Burgess
- Jason Beghe as Sergeant Henry "Hank" Voight
- Taylor Kinney as Lieutenant Kelly Severide
- David Eigenberg as firefighter Christopher Herrmann
- Kara Killmer as paramedic-in-charge Sylvie Brett
- Dora Madison as paramedic Jessica "Chili" Chilton
- Monica Raymund as firefighter Gabriela Dawson
- Yuri Sardarov as firefighter Brian “Otis” Zvonecek
- Joe Minoso as firefighter Joe Cruz
- Christian Stolte as firefighter Randy "Mouch" McHolland
- Alex Weisman as paramedic Chout
- Robyn Coffin as Cindy Herrmann

== Episodes ==
No. overall	No. in season	Title	Directed by	Written by	Original release date	Prod. code	U.S. viewers (millions)
1	1	"Derailed"	Michael Waxman	Story by : Andrew Dettmann; Teleplay by : Andrew Dettmann & Diane Frolov & Andrew Schneider	November 17, 2015	101	8.64
The grand opening of Chicago Med's emergency department is interrupted by victims of an "L" subway train crash, pushing the staff to their limits. Dr. Will Halstead and the new trauma fellow Dr. Connor Rhodes butt heads when the latter pulls rank when it comes to treating patients. Pregnant pediatrician Dr. Natalie Manning reveals that her husband was killed during his tour of duty in Afghanistan when she meets Dr Rhodes on the spot she relaxes at. Medical student Sarah Reese's first days on rotation take an emotional toll on her. Not able to use a needle correctly, taking too much time, and additional help from Dr Rhodes belittles her. Halstead and Manning are forced to perform an emergency surgery on a patient who is a surrogate to a couple. Guest appearance: Chicago Mayor Rahm Emanuel
2	2	"iNO"	Fred Berner	Stephen Hootstein	November 24, 2015	102	7.61
Dr. Manning treats a fourteen-year-old girl who gave birth and abandoned her baby son in an alley two blocks from the hospital. Dr Choi and Dr Rhodes lock heads because of Dr Choi's reckless decision of taking the umbilical cord out on his own since the OB-GYN was busy with a delivery. Dr. Charles and Reese treat a woman with a false case of dementia which is re-classified as hydrocephalus. Dr. Halstead treats a patient claiming he has suffered a heart attack which later turns much worse. Dr Manning and Dr Halstead get into an argument after they were both for one oxygen tank. Dr Halstead insults Dr Manning before taking the tank and saving his patient. The nurses team up to throw Dr. Manning her baby shower.
3	3	"Fallback"	Tara Nicole Weyr	Simran Baidwan	December 1, 2015	103	9.87
Dr Halstead tries to apologize to Dr Manning for whatever he said the other day but the latter is quite angry at him. Dr. Choi asks for Dr. Charles' help in finding out why his army veteran patient seems to have diabetes even though he has none of the risk factors. It turns out the veteran's wife had poisoned her own husband to stop him from going back to duty. Dr. Halstead treats a musician who is suffering from vertigo and may require dangerous surgery. Dr. Rhodes tries to treat a patient he's known for years who was impaled by a chandelier and deals with his overbearing father at the same time. Hospital staff is shocked to find out he is the son of a famous being, Cornelius Rhodes.
4	4	"Mistaken"	Donald Petrie	Eli Talbert	December 8, 2015	104	9.60
A mass movie theater shooting sends Chicago Med on edge. Dr. Halstead treats a patient who got trampled during the incident who later becomes brain-dead. Sharon refuses to approve a liver transplant that Dr. Rhodes needs for his patient. Dr. Manning and Dr. Charles treat a patient with an apparent eating disorder. The person who stopped the shooter is questioned when it turns out the shooter did not have a gun. Dr. Rhodes is involved with Dr. Zanetti and they sleep together.
5	5	"Malignant"	Nick Gomez	Jeff Drayer	January 5, 2016	105	8.39
Herrmann's condition takes a dramatic turn when Dr. Rhodes performs emergency surgery on him. Kelly Severide and Dr. Rhodes clash when it comes to Herrmann's treatment. Dr. Choi, Dr. Charles, and Detective Jay Halstead investigate a woman from a Firehouse 51 call who was admitted after a possible suicide attempt. The doctors discover she was receiving high doses of chemotherapy for cancer she never had. April's younger brother has his first day on rotation and finds himself in over his head. This episode continues a crossover with Chicago Fire and Chicago P.D. that begins on "The Beating Heart" and concludes on "Now I'm God". It is included on the Chicago Fire Season 4 and Chicago P.D. Season 3 DVD sets.
6	6	"Bound"	Michael Waxman	Will Pascoe	January 19, 2016	106	7.05
Dr. Rhodes treats two patients who were found stowed away on an airplane. Later, he meets with Sharon and Homeland Security, who are trying to get the undocumented immigrants deported. Reese asks for Dr. Charles' help telling a young patient that he has a terminal disease. Dr. Manning goes into labor, while Dr. Halstead meets Helen (Annie Potts), her controlling mother-in-law.
7	7	"Saints"	Jann Turner	Mary Leah Sutton	January 26, 2016	107	7.58
Dr. Halstead treats an ex-convict who was arrested for armed carjacking. Dr. Rhodes, Dr. Choi, and Reese treat a couple who were on a first date. Sharon receives news that a federal law will keep the hospital from performing an important bone marrow transplant. Dr. Manning and her mother-in-law care for her newborn child.
8	8	"Reunion"	Donald Petrie	Story by : David Weinstein; Teleplay by : David Weinstein & Stephen Hootstein	February 2, 2016	108	7.54
Dr. Halstead and Dr. Manning, who is back from maternity leave, treat a child with multiple medical issues whose father may have been unintentionally abusing her. Dr. Choi diagnoses an old friend with colon cancer. Reese and April treat a seemingly inebriated patient and Dr. Rhodes catches the attention of a high-profile surgeon preparing to operate on a Saudi Arabian prince.
9	9	"Choices"	Jean de Segonzac	Joshua Hale Fialkov	February 9, 2016	109	7.02
Dr. Halstead makes a decision that could cost him his job when he resuscitates a patient with stage four cancer who has a DNR in place. The nurses at the hospital ask their patients to fill out patient satisfaction cards. Reese and April care for a homeless man. Dr. Choi's issues surface after he treats a patient with a bipolar disorder.
10	10	"Clarity"	Fred Berner	Safura Fadavi	February 16, 2016	110	6.66
Dr. Choi and Reese deal with an overbearing father while treating his son following a hockey incident. Dr. Halstead deals with the fallout from his last patient and butts heads with Dr. Manning. Dr. Rhodes and Dr. Downey perform a lung transplant on a 9/11 hero suffering from pulmonary fibrosis.
11	11	"Intervention"	Sanford Bookstaver	Story by : Jeff Drayer & Simran Baidwan; Teleplay by : Jeff Drayer & Simran Baidwan & Diane Frolov & Andrew Schneider	February 23, 2016	111	6.64
Dr. Halstead is faced with the lawsuit brought by the woman he resuscitated against a DNR. Reese diagnoses a patient with a flesh-eating disease, and Dr. Choi and Dr. Rhodes treat a patient with a failing heart. Dr. Manning diagnoses a young girl with an infectious bacterium, but her parents do not want her vaccinated. Sharon celebrates her wedding anniversary.
12	12	"Guilty"	Holly Dale	Mary Leah Sutton & Danny Weiss & Stephen Hootstein	March 29, 2016	112	8.68
Dr. Halstead continues to deal with the fallout from the lawsuit brought against him by his DNR patient. A police officer tries to stop a DUI driver from being taken to surgery, leading to Maggie being arrested, and Dr. Manning misdiagnoses a mother of child abuse. Meanwhile, Dr. Charles and Reese diagnose a patient with suicidal thoughts and place him on psychological hold.
13	13	"Us"	Michael Waxman	Diane Frolov & Andrew Schneider & Jeff Drayer	April 5, 2016	113	7.23
Still dealing with the fallout of his DNR patient, Dr. Halstead tries to organize a baptism for Dr. Manning's son Owen. April befriends the father of a patient who was rushed in for swallowing magnets. Dr. Reese performs a procedure for which she is not qualified on a patient while awaiting the results of her residency match and Dr. Charles diagnoses a patient with a rare disorder when he tries to saw off his own arm.
14	14	"Hearts"	Donald Petrie	Liz Brixius	April 19, 2016	114	8.16
As Dr. Choi deals with his PTSD, he treats a veteran with an unusual heart problem. Dr. Manning treats a child who she originally thought was being abused by his father, until Dr. Charles makes a shocking diagnosis to the patient's brother. Dr. Rhodes must deal with the fallout of a child dying on his operating table. April starts to date a young patient's father, against Maggie's advice. Reese faints in front of Dr. Halstead, and it turns out she does not want to leave the ER for pathology, which Sharon says is not possible since the residency choices are legally binding contracts.
15	15	"Inheritance"	Stephen Cragg	Joseph Sousa	April 26, 2016	115	9.00
Dr. Choi deals with a surrogate mother who is at 32 weeks and needs an emergency c-section because the baby is in distress but tries to refuse, because she will not receive her bonus if it is not full-term. Meanwhile, Dr. Halstead treats a pair of brothers from his high school who used to bully him. Dr. Manning and Dr. Charles treat a patient with severe stomach pains. Also, April gets annoyed when she catches her brother running a side business without a license. Dr. Rhodes avoids seeing his sister to discuss family issues.
16	16	"Disorder"	Ami Mann	Eli Talbert	May 3, 2016	116	7.62
Dr. Charles and Dr. Rhodes have a patient presenting with mental and heart problems, allegedly with Lewy Body dementia. It takes some thought, but they sort out the initial misdiagnosis. Meanwhile, Dr. Manning and Reese treat a dog biting victim, Dr. Choi tags along with the paramedics and receives a call from a burn victim who lives like a hoarder. Meanwhile, Sharon warns everyone at the hospital to be on their professional behavior when the Joint Commission visits.
17	17	"Withdrawal"	Fred Berner	Jeff Drayer & Stephen Hootstein	May 10, 2016	117	8.01
Dr. Halstead and April butt heads when it comes to treating a patient with severe alcohol withdrawals and a broken leg. Meanwhile, Dr. Manning has a cardiac event when she loses her wedding ring, Dr. Rhodes is forced to perform bloodless surgery because of a patient who is a Jehovah's Witness and won't take a blood transfusion. Reese and Dr. Charles deals with elderly patients with the same symptoms.
18	18	"Timing"	Michael Waxman	Diane Frolov & Andrew Schneider	May 17, 2016	118	7.86
Dr. Rhodes regrets to inform Dr. Downey that his liver cancer has spread to the brain and is not curable. Dr. Manning and Reese deal with an infant patient with multiple medical issues. Sharon learns that her husband is leaving her. Dr. Choi consults Dr. Charles about the parrot he rescued from the hoarder's house (in "Disorder") and gets a surprising suggestion. Also, Dr. Halstead bothers April to get an X-Ray following a serious fall she suffered. The X-Ray reveals April has tuberculosis. Reese and Dr. Halstead anxiously wait to hear about their futures. The episode ends with Dr. Rhodes spreading Dr. Downey's ashes in Hawaii.

== Production ==
The series was greenlighted by NBC for the show's pilot episode on May 1, 2015.

=== Casting ===
Laurie Holden was originally cast as Dr. Hannah Tramble, but dropped out due to "family reasons". On May 29, 2015, Arrow star Colin Donnell was cast as Dr. Connor Rhodes, the hospital's newest ED physician. In July 2015, Brian Tee joined the cast as Dr. Ethan Choi, an expert in infectious disease prevention and a Navy Reserve medical officer. Pretty Little Liars star Torrey DeVitto was cast on August 13, 2015, as Dr. Natalie Manning, the ED pediatrician. On August 14, 2015, Rachel DiPillo was cast as Sarah Reese, a fourth year medical student. On April 13, 2016, it was announced that Jeff Hephner would reprise his Chicago Fire role as Jeff Clarke in the season finale, however he has swapped professions and is now a fourth-year med student.

=== Crossovers ===
A three-way crossover between Chicago Fire, Chicago Med and Chicago P.D. aired on January 5 and 6, 2016.

== Ratings ==
Viewership and ratings per episode of Chicago Med season 1
No.	Title	Air date	Rating/share (18–49)	Viewers (millions)	DVR (18–49)	DVR viewers (millions)	Total (18–49)	Total viewers (millions)
1	"Derailed"	November 17, 2015	2.2/7	8.64	—N/a	—N/a	—N/a	—N/a
2	"iNO"	November 24, 2015	1.8/6	7.61	0.8	2.68	2.6	10.29
3	"Fallback"	December 1, 2015	2.0/6	9.87	0.7	2.35	2.7	12.22
4	"Mistaken"	December 8, 2015	2.1/7	9.60	0.8	2.51	2.9	12.11
5	"Malignant"	January 5, 2016	1.9/6	8.39	1.1	3.97	3.0	12.36
6	"Bound"	January 19, 2016	1.6/5	7.05	0.8	3.02	2.4	10.07
7	"Saint"	January 26, 2016	1.7/5	7.58	0.6	2.38	2.3	9.96
8	"Reunion"	February 2, 2016	1.6/5	7.54	0.8	2.70	2.4	10.24
9	"Choices"	February 9, 2016	1.6/5	7.02	0.8	2.74	2.4	9.76
10	"Clarity"	February 16, 2016	1.4/5	6.66	0.9	2.95	2.3	9.61
11	"Intervention"	February 23, 2016	1.5/5	6.64	0.8	2.94	2.3	9.58
12	"Guilty"	March 29, 2016	1.8/6	8.68	0.8	2.90	2.6	11.58
13	"Us"	April 5, 2016	1.5/5	7.23	0.8	2.93	2.3	10.13
14	"Hearts"	April 19, 2016	1.6/5	8.16	0.9	2.90	2.5	11.06
15	"Inheritance"	April 26, 2016	1.8/6	9.00	0.8	2.69	2.6	11.58
16	"Disorder"	May 3, 2016	1.5/5	7.62	0.8	2.86	2.3	10.48
17	"Withdrawal"	May 10, 2016	1.6/6	8.01	0.8	2.86	2.4	10.86
18	"Timing"	May 17, 2016	1.6/5	7.86	0.8	2.78	2.4	10.64

== Home media ==
The DVD release of season one was released in Region 1 on August 30, 2016.

The Complete First Season
Set details			Special features
18 episodes; 851 minutes (Region 1); 5-disc set; 1.78:1 aspect ratio; Languages: English (Dolby Digital 5.1); Portuguese (Dolby Digital 5.1); Spanish (Dolby Digital 5.1); Subtitles: English (Region 1); Portuguese (Region 1); Spanish (Region 1)			Chicago Fire Season 4 Crossover Episode – "The Beating Heart"; Chicago P.D. Season 3 Crossover Episode – "Now I'm God"
Release dates			Chicago Fire Season 4 Crossover Episode – "The Beating Heart"; Chicago P.D. Season 3 Crossover Episode – "Now I'm God"
United States	United Kingdom	Australia	Chicago Fire Season 4 Crossover Episode – "The Beating Heart"; Chicago P.D. Season 3 Crossover Episode – "Now I'm God"
August 30, 2016	September 12, 2016	April 26, 2017	Chicago Fire Season 4 Crossover Episode – "The Beating Heart"; Chicago P.D. Season 3 Crossover Episode – "Now I'm God"
