= List of Chicago P.D. characters =

This is a list of fictional characters in the television series Chicago P.D. The article deals with the series' main, recurring, and minor characters.

== Main characters ==
=== Overview ===
= Main cast (credited)
= Recurring cast (3+)
= Guest cast (1–2)

| Name | Portrayed by | Position | Seasons | | | | | | | | | | | | | |
| Name | Portrayed by | Position | 1 | 2 | 3 | 4 | 5 | 6 | 7 | 8 | 9 | 10 | 11 | 12 | 13 | 14 |
|---|---|---|---|---|---|---|---|---|---|---|---|---|---|---|---|---|
| Hank Voight | Jason Beghe | Sergeant | Main | | | | | | | | | | | | | |
| Antonio Dawson | Jon Seda | Detective II | Main (Note: Main Episodes 1–8 of season 4; guest episodes 14 and 16 of season 4.) | | | | | | | | | | | | | |
| Erin Lindsay | Sophia Bush | Detective I | Main | | | | | | | | | | | | | |
| Jay Halstead | Jesse Lee Soffer | Detective I | Main | | | | | | | | | | | | Guest | |
| Adam Ruzek | Patrick John Flueger | Police Officer | Main | | | | | | | | | | | | | |
| Kim Burgess | Marina Squerciati | Detective I | Main | | | | | | | | | | | | | |
| Kevin Atwater | LaRoyce Hawkins | Police Officer | Main (Note: Episodes 1–2 of season 14 only) | | | | | | | | | | | | | |
| Sheldon Jin | Archie Kao | Detective I | Main | | | | | | | | | | | | | |
| Alvin Olinsky | Elias Koteas | Detective II | Main | | | | | | | | | | Guest | | | |
| Trudy Platt | Amy Morton | Sergeant | Recurring | Main | | | | | | | | | | | | |
| Sean Roman | Brian Geraghty | Police Officer | | Main | | | | | Guest | | | | | | | |
| Hailey Upton | Tracy Spiridakos | Detective I | | | | Recurring (Note: Episodes 21–23 of season 4 only) | Main | | | | | | | | Guest | |
| Vanessa Rojas | Lisseth Chavez | Police Officer | | | | | | | Main (Note: Main from episode 4 until episode 20 of season 7) | | | | | | | |
| Dante Torres | Benjamin Levy Aguilar | Police Officer | | | | | | | | | Guest | Main | | | | |
| Kiana Cook | Toya Turner | Police Officer | | | | | | | | | | | | Main | | |
| Eva Imani | Arienne Mandi | Police Officer | | | | | | | | | | | | | Main | |

=== Jay Halstead ===
Jay Halstead
- Chicago P.D. character
- First appearance: CF: A Problem House (episode 2.01); CPD: Stepping Stone (episode 1.01); CM: Mistaken (episode 1.04); SVU: Chicago Crossover (episode 16.07)
- Last appearance: Chicago P.D.: Reckoning, Part III (episode 13.13)
- Created by: Matt Olmstead
- Portrayed by: Jesse Lee Soffer

In-universe information
- Full name: Jason Halstead
- Nicknames: Jay; Mr. Long Island Iced Tea; Officer Friendly
- Gender: Male
- Occupation: U.S. Army, SFC; CPD, Detective II (formerly)
- Family: Patrick "Pat" Halstead (father; deceased); Mrs. Halstead (mother; deceased); William "Will" Halstead (brother); Unnamed grandfather Patrick James Halstead (nephew); Moira (cousin); Kevin (cousin)
- Spouses: Abby McSweeney (ex-wife); Hailey Upton (ex-wife)
- Significant others: Erin Lindsay (ex-girlfriend); Gabriela Dawson (ex-girlfriend); Camila Vega (ex-girlfriend); Allie Corson (ex-girlfriend)
- Nationality: American
- Date of birth: August 29, 1984 or 1985

Police career / Military career
- Department Service: Chicago Police Department; United States Army: Intelligence Unit, CPD; Undercover assignment, CPD (CF: S2); Patrol, CPD (pre-CF); Active Guard Reserve, US Army; 3rd Battalion, 75th Ranger Regiment, US Army
- Years of service: 2006–2022 (CPD); 2001–2006; 2022–present (US Army)
- Rank: Detective II, CPD; Sergeant First Class, US Army
- Badge No.: 51163
- Radio Code: 5021 George

Portrayed by Jesse Lee Soffer

Detective Jason "Jay" Halstead first appears on Chicago Fire as an undercover cop assigned to shadow and take down a local mobster who is harassing Gabriela Dawson, one of the owners of Molly's bar. He requests a transfer to the Intelligence Unit after the assignment ends with him getting shot but successfully arresting the mobster. Chicago P.D. begins a month following his transfer. Aside from the undercover assignment that served as a premise for his transfer to Intelligence, little is known about his early CPD career, except that he was already friends with Antonio Dawson prior to the transfer and that he joined after serving in the military.

Halstead is the younger brother of Will Halstead, an attending at the (fictional) Chicago Medical Center and a main character in Chicago Med. Their mother died of cancer and they had a very difficult relationship with their father Pat, who initially disapproved of his sons not following the expected practice to immediately find work locally after high school; instead, both his sons left Chicago to find their own career paths, Will for medical school and Jay for the military. Will moved to New York City for medical school and was overseas doing humanitarian work in Sudan but hit a rough patch when his relationship with a girl did not work out. Their mother's death is a sore point as Jay still harbors some lingering resentment over the fact that Will was not around during that time and "out partying" (presumably to get over his ex-girlfriend). Otherwise, the brothers share a close relationship and look out for one another. The Halsteads are from a working class Irish Catholic background, based on the fact that both brothers attended Catholic school and Will's statements about being an altar boy and growing up in Canaryville, a historically Irish neighborhood in the South Side of Chicago. Jay mentions to his partner Erin Lindsay that their grandfather has a cabin in rural northern Wisconsin. He briefly references being ostracized by his more affluent counterparts at a private school and it is very likely that he went to De La Salle Institute with Will, who was also bullied at school (although for his academic prowess).

Halstead is a second-generation United States Army veteran and served with the 3rd Battalion, 75th Ranger Regiment. With the introduction of his friend Greg "Mouse" Gerwitz as a recurring character, Halstead's military past is gradually revealed. During one of their tours in Afghanistan they were both deployed to the notoriously hostile Korangal Valley and were in the lead Humvee of a convoy which was attacked, resulting in Mouse being given a medical discharge. In the season 9 episode "The One Next to Me", a former army buddy reveals that Halstead was known as "Ricky", short for ricochet, for his uncanny ability as a sniper to hit the target by ricochet. His experience in Afghanistan was quite traumatic and he still exhibits symptoms of posttraumatic stress disorder, specifically insomnia, nightmares and flashbacks. With no familial support, he had difficulty readjusting to civilian life when he first returned stateside and spent a period of time "doing nothing but drink, smoke, screw, fight". However, he remains mostly reticent about his time in the military, although cases involving veterans and children still affect him personally. After leaving the military, he joined the Chicago Police Department. His military background and training is apparent, despite having left the service for quite some time. For example, his apartment is spartan and well-kept and he is very physically fit, highly proficient in close quarters combat and able to maintain his concentration on a subject from behind a sniper rifle scope for long periods of time.

Halstead is known for his bluntness, especially when interrogating suspects. In season 1, he sometimes rubs his superior Detective Sergeant Hank Voight the wrong way for questioning the latter's actions. Despite his calm and collected demeanor, he can be brash in making split-second decisions and has a temper. However, Voight retains him in the Intelligence Unit because he recognizes Halstead's skill and dedication to the job. Voight initially treats Halstead as if he is there because he was friends with Dawson, but by season 2, it is apparent that he trusts Halstead and regards him highly, as shown in the episode "Push the Pain Away", where he specifically requests for Halstead to be the marksman to cover for him despite the heavy presence of specialist SWAT officers, and in the season 5 episode "Reform", where he goes to great lengths to defend Halstead's innocence to an alderman. A highly skilled marksman, Halstead is proficient with his standard issue Glock 17 and M4 firearms as well as a sniper rifle and has an extensive knowledge of ballistics and explosives. When a situation requires, he (or sometimes with Olinsky, who is also a military veteran) usually serves as the designated sniper to cover the rest of the unit.

Halstead has the tendency to blur the line separating his private and personal life, especially when people close to him are involved. For example, he conducts his own surveillance of Lonnie Rodiger, a young pedophile whom he correctly suspects of murdering young boys, including the younger brother of his high school girlfriend Allie. In the season 2 crossover with Law & Order: Special Victims Unit, when Will is called in for questioning by Sergeant Benson from the NYPD SVU and Voight because Will knew a victim, Halstead storms into Voight's office and tells them that they will get a written statement from Will and nothing more. Likewise, in season 6, he disobeys Voight's order to stay on desk duty upon hearing that the fire his father died in was an arson and continues to pursue the case by himself.

In the pilot episode, it is established that Halstead has been partnered with Erin Lindsay for the past month and they share a close relationship, which has evolved into a more intimate relationship at various times (which they have had to keep secret) but prevented from going any further due to Voight's dislike of "in-house romances". She tries to set him up on dates with her friends in the first several episodes of season 1 but soon realizes that she has feelings for him. He was presumably the first person Lindsay had confided her past to, in full detail. The two strike up a romantic relationship after Erin transfers to a federal task force, as they no longer have to worry about fraternization rules. After her return to the squad, their relationship cools down on orders from Voight. When Lindsay spirals out of control in the weeks following Nadia's death, he tries to help her, even after Voight has given up. She returns in the season 3 premiere, after his cover is blown during an undercover operation to nab a drug kingpin. She rescues him in the nick of time and decides to return to Intelligence, where she is again partnered with Halstead. They reconnect and rekindle their relationship. In the episode "You Never Know Who's Who", they go public for the first time by openly kissing while hanging out at Molly's. They generally maintain a professional front when at work; Burgess once tells Lindsay that she "[forgets] sometimes that you and Jay are dating, 'cause you guys make it look so easy". It is established in the season 4 episode "A Shot Heard Round the World" that they are living together.

In episode "Remember the Devil", it is revealed that Halstead was married to a woman named Abby, whom he met while deployed in Afghanistan and married in a drunken one-night stand. It causes a rift in his relationship with Lindsay, and he moves out of their apartment at the end of the episode. At the end of the episode "Fork in the Road", he is seen making a call to Lindsay to propose to her, but she doesn't pick up. It is later revealed that she was leaving for New York City after a series of incidents from the episode essentially led to her accepting a job there and escape further scrutiny from the CPD.

In the season 5 premiere "Reform", Halstead is partnered with Hailey Upton and their partnership continues to be rocky. He is a subject in an investigation and receives scrutiny from the public when a drug deal goes wrong. When a young girl is shot during the ordeal (and eventually dies at Chicago Med), it is revealed that the bullet came from his gun.

In "Care Under Fire", it becomes known that he is still having nightmares about his tours in Afghanistan. He goes undercover to infiltrate a kidnapping crew composed of military veterans and strikes up a friendship with Luis Vega, his "target", due to their shared background as former Rangers who had been deployed to Afghanistan. When the target is killed, his flashbacks came up causing him to come dangerously close to shooting Upton. During the episode, he starts a relationship with Camila Vega, Luis's sister. He continues to pose as Ryan and does not reveal his true identity to her.

In "Rabbit Hole", the relationship between Halstead and Camila takes a dramatic turn when he unintentionally gets himself in the middle of a drug operation and a murder of an undercover DEA agent. He later finds out that Camila is a person of interest. But later in the investigation, she confesses that she was recruiting people to become drug dealers. When Voight sees that Halstead is acting strange, he asks him if he is in a relationship with her, but he lies and denies it. But when the sting in getting the murderer to confess falls apart, his colleagues rush in the garage and as she is getting arrested, she realizes that he is a cop. As she is sitting in a jail cell, Upton convinces Camila to not see Halstead again and to not speak of their relationship to anyone or face spending years in prison. In the following episode, "Confidential", he is placed on desk duty by Voight and ordered to see a psychiatrist. He eventually returns to the field and admits to Upton in the episode "Chasing Monsters" that he found therapy helpful and is finally addressing his PTSD.

After a rocky start to his new partnership with Upton in season 5, the duo become close friends and confidants, often supporting one another after difficult cases. In "Endings", after his father was declared brain dead, he investigates the person responsible for the fire. During the investigation, it becomes known that Daniel Mendoza, a drug cartel member, is the one responsible. When attempting to take his brother, Juan Mendoza, into custody, Halstead almost gets into an altercation with him, only for Upton and Ruzek to stop him. Voight benches Halstead due to his personal connection to the case. Jay is so enraged by this that he insults Upton's dad, saying she's projecting her own father issues. Upton, tired of him using her as a punching bag, demands he hand the keys to her. He calls Severide to give him a radio and a ride. He then takes a radio from a uniformed officer and chases after Daniel on foot, he is shot and wounded by Mendoza who is attempting to evade police. Halstead, in return, shoots and killed him. Voight berates him for going against his orders and tells him that their conversation is not over.

In the season 6 episode "Trigger", he was visibly affected by the fact that a fellow veteran would frame a local imam and kill innocent people in a deluded quest to prove that the imam was financially supporting terrorist activity; for the first time, Halstead speaks at length about his time in the military and comments that he has learned to live with his PTSD and move on with life, unlike the perpetrator.

In "Outrage", while working undercover in a drug bust, it goes sideways when the team identifies the suspect as Matthew Garrett, a perp who Halstead thought was in prison. Jay tries to bail before any trouble starts, but Garrett has also recognized him and publicly calls him out, leading to a brief confrontation. As he leaves the club, Jay describes the guy as “the devil.” A paperwork SNAFU leads to Garrett getting a huge payoff for wrongful arrest, and now he is using it to fund his drug operation. Halstead particularly hates him because Garrett killed a 17-year-old girl. With Halstead benched by Voight over an official complaint against him, they go ahead of the drug bust. Instead of Garrett, his two henchmen are there. Upon finding out the location, Halstead is the first person through the warehouse door and finds Garrett shot in the neck. He dies shortly thereafter, leaving Jay without the location of the murdered girl's body. When investigated by Internal Affairs, Voight instructs Halstead to lie and say Garrett died before he got there, instead of in front of him. Kelton, along with everyone, is convinced Halstead is the prime suspect in his murder. Voight goes to his old friend, former Detective Gus, for answers. While there, he confesses to murder and tells him to look the other way. When he can't, he gives him "some time alone" in which he commits suicide and Halstead is off the hook.

In the season 11 premiere, "Unpacking", Hailey and Jay have gotten divorced as Hailey filed the divorce papers as she walked out of the station.

==== Crossovers ====
Halstead first appears on Chicago Fire as a recurring character before becoming a main character on Chicago P.D.. Within the Chicago franchise, the character has crossed-over to Fire and Med as part of the CPD investigation. He also appears on Law & Order: Special Victims Unit to assist with cross-jurisdiction cases.

The character is introduced in season 2 as a regular customer at Molly's, a bar jointly run by paramedic Gabriela Dawson and her firefighter colleagues. He has fallen for Gabby but she breaks up with him upon finding out he is a "henchman" of Arthur, a local thug who has threatened to burn down Molly's. Although her brother Antonio tells her that Halstead is actually a cop, Gabby decides to end their relationship because she felt betrayed even though she understood that Halstead could not blow his cover. They part on friendly terms after Halstead successfully arrests Arthur, taking a bullet to his shoulder in the process. As a result, he opts out of undercover work and joins Antonio in the Intelligence Unit.

Halstead also appears later in the season as the lead detective on a murder case involving Gabby's colleague at Firehouse 51. One of Lieutenant Severide's men Jeff Clarke is a suspect when the ex-lover of his wife is found dead. The ex-lover turns out to be a loanshark who repeatedly harassed the Clarkes to the point where Clarke has verbally threatened him and goes to his house with a sniper rifle intending to kill him. Clarke, an Iraq veteran, later admits that he tried to protect his wife because she had been there for him when he came home from his deployment, to which Halstead replies that he understands and can sympathize.

Halstead is a central character in the 2018 crossovers with Chicago Fire and Chicago Med. Firehouse 51 firefighters are called to the apartment building where his father Pat lives. Pat eventually dies at Chicago Medical Center of complications from his injuries. Unlike Will, who had reconciled with their father in the Med episode "Generation Gap", Jay never did and only finds out the truth after sifting through his father's belongings and finding a picture of him during his graduation from the CPD academy.

- Chicago Fire(season 2):
  - "A Problem House" (September 24, 2013)
  - "Prove It" (October 1, 2013)
  - "Defcon 1" (October 8, 2013)
  - "A Nuisance Call" (October 15, 2013)
  - "A Power Move" (October 22, 2013)
  - "Joyriding" (November 12, 2013)
  - "Shoved in My Face" (January 7, 2014)
  - "A Dark Day (1)" (April 29, 2014)
- Law & Order: Special Victims Unit: "Chicago Crossover" (November 12, 2014)
- Chicago Fire: "Arrest in Transit" (November 25, 2014)
- Chicago Fire: "Let Him Die" (January 6, 2015)
- Chicago Fire: "I Am the Apocalypse" (April 7, 2015)
- Law & Order: Special Victims Unit: "Daydream Believer" (April 29, 2015)
- Chicago Med: "Mistaken" (December 8, 2015)
- Chicago Med: "Malignant" (January 5, 2016)
- Chicago Med: "Free Will" (November 10, 2016)

==== Awards and decorations ====
These are the medals fictionally worn by Halstead.

Personal decorations
| Width-44 ribbon with two width-9 ultramarine blue stripes surrounded by two pairs of two width-4 green stripes; all these stripes are separated by width-2 white borders | Army Achievement Medal, w/1 bronze oak leaf cluster (2nd award) |
Unit awards
| | Presidential Unit Citation, w/2 bronze oak leaf clusters (3rd award) |
| Width-44 Old Glory red ribbon surrounded by gold frame. The ribbon has a central width-3 Old Glory red stripe flanked by pairs of stripes that are respectively width-3 white, width-3 ultramarine blue, width one-half white and width-2 ultramarine blue. | Valorous Unit Award, w/3 bronze oak leaf clusters (4th award) |
Service Awards
| | Army Good Conduct Medal |
Campaign and service medals
| | National Defense Service Medal |
| | Afghanistan Campaign Medal, w/1 bronze service star (2nd award) |
| | Global War on Terrorism Expeditionary Medal |
| | Global War on Terrorism Service Medal |
Service and training awards
| | Army Service Ribbon |
| | Overseas Service Ribbon |

Other accoutrements
| Combat Infantryman Badge |
| Parachutist Badge |
| Army Expert Marksmanship Badge |
| 75th Ranger Regiment Combat Service Identification Badge |
| Ranger tab |

=== Adam Ruzek ===
Adam Ruzek
- Chicago P.D. character
- First appearance: Chicago P.D.: Stepping Stone (episode 1.01); CF: The Nuclear Option (episode 3.05)
- Created by: Matt Olmstead
- Portrayed by: Patrick John Flueger

In-universe information
- Nicknames: Ruz; Ruzey
- Gender: Male
- Occupation: Police officer
- Family: Robert "Bob" Ruzek (father; deceased); Unnamed mother Kate Ruzek (sister); Sam (nephew); Mike (uncle); Unnamed aunt Marla (cousin; deceased)
- Spouse: Kim Burgess (m. 2025)
- Significant others: Hailey Upton (ex-girlfriend); Wendy (former fiancée); Nicole (former fiancée)
- Children: Unborn child (miscarriage); Makayla Ward Burgess (adoptive daughter)
- Relatives: Nicole Silver (sister-in-law); Zoey Silver (niece)
- Nationality: American
- Date of birth: March 23, 1989

Police career
- Department: Chicago Police Department: Intelligence Unit (S1–present); Patrol (temporary); Academy cadet (S1 premiere)
- Years of service: 2013–present
- Rank: Officer
- Badge No.: 59054
- Radio Code: 5021 Ida

Portrayed by Patrick John Flueger

Officer Adam Ruzek makes his first appearance during the pilot episode "Stepping Stone", which was broadcast on January 8, 2014. Ruzek is a police officer in the intelligence unit of the Chicago Police Department. He also makes recurring appearances in Chicago Fire.

Ruzek's parents divorced when he was a child, and he would split time between his father in Beverly and mother in Canaryville. His father, Bob Ruzek (Jack Coleman), better known as "Disco Bob", is a longtime patrol officer with the 26th District who served with both Voight and Olinsky. Little is known about Ruzek's background as he rarely talks about his personal life. In season 5, he is blackmailed by Denny Woods into spying on the team in order to save himself and his sister from prison, and his nephew from going to foster care.

In the pilot episode, Ruzek is still in the academy and about to graduate when he is handpicked by Detective Alvin Olinsky for an undercover assignment. The first season sees him trying to adjust to his new role in the intelligence unit. Although he is warmly welcomed by the team, his impulsive behavior occasionally lands him into trouble with Voight and Olinsky and irks his more senior colleagues. His naiveté becomes apparent during his first stakeout, when he repeatedly looks at his phone and takes bathroom breaks. Olinsky temporarily has him transferred to uniformed patrol duty as a warning. Over time, he begins to settle in and becomes more mature and less impetuous. During a shootout with Jacob Sims, Adam is shot in the chest. The injury is not severe as his Kevlar vest deflects most of the shot. In the season 3 episode "Climbing into Bed", Ruzek has his badge temporarily revoked for going undercover without authorization. Platt reluctantly pulls some strings to lighten his punishment, and Voight assures her that Ruzek is worth the risk. He strikes up a friendship with Officer Kevin Atwater, who transfers to Intelligence from patrol in season 2, and they often banter with one another.

In season 1, Ruzek is engaged to a woman named Wendy. They are shown to have a close and playful relationship, sending racy photos of each other back and forth. He tries to keep his professional and private lives separate but has difficulty doing so. He tells her that he is assigned to a desk job at district headquarters, which she eventually discovers is not true after he is shot. That relationship fell apart, partly due his job and partly to his growing infatuation with patrol officer Kim Burgess. After Wendy calls off their engagement, Ruzek and Burgess pursue a romantic relationship. They share a playful relationship, with Ruzek often showing public displays of affection even at work. For example, he agrees to help her take "revenge" on Platt. He proposes to her in the season 2 finale and she happily accepts. It gradually becomes apparent to Burgess that Ruzek has commitment issues. She begins to doubt him after learning that he had an ex-fiancée before Wendy. At the end of "Looking Out for Stateville," she calls off the engagement in the same placed he proposed, leaving them both devastated. When Burgess and her partner Sean Roman appear to be flirting, he becomes jealous and their friendship becomes strained.

In season 3, it is revealed that Ruzek still loves Kim and wants nothing more than to resume his relationship with her.

In the middle of season 4, Ruzek returns from an undercover job, hoping his job with intelligence is still open, but while he was gone his spot was taken by Kenny Rixton. Ruzek then talks to Voight about his old spot in Intelligence and asks if he can get it back. Voight cannot give Ruzek his old spot, so he has to work in Uniform. Ruzek is cleaning his locker when Rixton tells him that he is transferring to a newly formed Narcotics unit. Ruzek then gets his job back in Intelligence, but does not get back together with Kim.

In the season 5 premiere "Reform", he appears to be more aggressive with the public, and when Atwater explains to him about the interactions between police and black men, he shrugs off by explaining his problems with political correctness.

In "Snitch", his aggressive behavior takes a toll when he punches a suspect and Upton manages to get him out of the situation; he comes briefly under investigation by Internal Affairs but it is dropped when Upton convinces the mother of the suspect's child to get him to withdraw the complaint.

In "Fallen", Ruzek is recruited by Lieutenant Denny Woods, after Woods finds evidence that he deletes information that his sister was charged in a DUI while his nephew was sitting in the car with her. Woods uses it to blackmail Ruzek into getting incriminating evidence to take Voight down.

In "Care Under Fire", Ruzek uploads video of Halstead, while undercover, in a bar fight. He gives it to Woods during a disclosed meeting.

In "Monster", he gets Voight on video taking money from a crime scene without putting it into evidence. Ruzek intends to give it to Woods, but when he meets with Woods, he refuses to give him the video because of loyalty toward Voight. Olinsky persuades Ruzek to go with him to meet a CI but instead drives him to meet with Voight, who has discovered that Ruzek is the mole.

In "Rabbit Hole", Ruzek tries to explain the situation to Voight but is cut short. While Voight cannot do anything about the threatened charges against Ruzek, he conspires with Ruzek to take down Woods. When Ruzek meets with Woods, Woods shoves him onto the car, accusing him of undermining Wood's credibility since the money actually was put into evidence by Voight, unknown to Ruzek. When this meeting is over, it is revealed Voight was there watching it go down.

At the end of "Confidential", after apologizing about the way he treated Burgess during his relationship with her, they end up having a one-night stand.

In "Homecoming", Ruzek finds out that Olinsky has died from his injuries sustained from the stabbing; he supports Voight's actions by trying to block Antonio from intervening in Voight's beating of the killer. He is also present when Voight beats one of the co-conspirators to force him to give the name of who was in charge.

In "New Normal", with Voight suspended, Dawson is put in charge of the unit, and Ruzek begins to butt heads with him. Ruzek gets in touch with Voight for assistance when the investigation into bad drugs is getting nowhere but dead bodies at every turn. He screams at Antonio for Voight not being there. Later, both Ruzek and Dawson have opposing views on good police work to the point of getting into a violent brawl in a dope lab.

In "Bad Boys", he starts a relationship with Hailey Upton, while keeping it a secret from others. In "Sacrifice", Upton ends the relationship with him, citing their careers.

In "Fathers and Sons", while Ruzek is working undercover in an investigation of a drug dealing ring that involves the brutal death of a young drug mule, he finds out that his father, Disco Bob, is also involved. The next morning he visits his father's house for a meeting of the minds. Bob says he's just “getting paid” and there's nothing else his son needs to know about, but wants his name kept out of the report. Upon this discovery, Upton demands that he either tells Voight about his father's involvement or she will. Ruzek chooses the first option and tries to convince Voight that his father is clean. Voight appears skeptical, telling his subordinate that they're going to follow the facts, no matter where that takes them. Bob accidentally stumbles into the drug deal, which incites a shootout that gets him wounded and blows everyone's cover. Ruzek visits his dad in the hospital and demands to know why he didn't get out when he was warned to. Bob admits that he took the Scorpion Club job because he's broke, thanks to “some bad investments.” He gets teary-eyed as he apologizes for messing up the case and wanting to try and help his son. Voight confirms that Bob is innocent and says that he “was working undercover with us” to cover him.

In "Descent", after Voight and Ruzek capture Jason Rizzo, a drug dealer/rapist responsible for kidnapping Antonio's daughter, they let Antonio beat up the suspect to the point that he is pushed to his death. In "Brotherhood", upon learning of Antonio's addiction in "Descent", he covers for him at the same time as the OID is investigating the events that transpired, infuriating Voight to the point of almost getting into an altercation with him. In "Reckoning", during a meeting with Platt, Voight, and Antonio, they learn that Internal Affairs has taken over the investigation. When he gets called in by Internal Affairs Detective David Heller, he sticks to his story of what had happened, despite the fact that the detective already knows that Antonio was responsible. He almost gets into an altercation with Voight, with Voight citing that he is not Alvin Olinsky. At the end, Trudy walks into the unit, saying IAD is there to arrest Adam, but she will take him down to save him the scene, while everyone is opposed to the outcome. Adam appreciates them wanting to come down but doesn't want them to. Everyone is upset, but Antonio remains mum. Trudy walks Adam out, who touches the door; telling him to do more than keep his head down especially if he ends up in General Population. She tries to keep talking but Adam kisses her, saying he will be all right. Heller arrests him and escorts him into the car. Adam goes through the booking process as Antonio sits in the car, popping a pill. Adam sits in the holding cell as the barred door slams shut.

In "Doubt", Ruzek has been stripped of his police powers and is awaiting trial. However, in "Assets", Ruzek's case is dismissed by a favor pulled by Voight, which grants Ruzek his position in Intelligence once again; this event fortifies his loyalty to the latter.

==== Crossovers ====
- Chicago Fire – "The Nuclear Option" (September 30, 2014)
- Chicago Fire – "I Am the Apocalypse" (April 7, 2015)
- Chicago Fire – "Short and Fat" (December 8, 2015)
- Chicago Fire – "The Beating Heart" (January 5, 2016)
- Chicago Fire – "All Hard Parts" (February 9, 2016)
- Chicago Fire – "Hiding Not Seeking" (March 8, 2018)
- Chicago Med – "Tell Me the Truth" (April 3, 2019)
- Chicago Fire – "Until the Weather Breaks" (April 24, 2019)

=== Kevin Atwater ===
Kevin Atwater
- First appearance: CPD: "Stepping Stone" (episode 1.01); CF: "Let Her Go" (episode 1.23)
- Created by: Matt Olmstead
- Portrayed by: LaRoyce Hawkins

In-universe information
- Nicknames: Kev; Atwater
- Gender: Male
- Occupation: Police officer
- Family: Lew Atwater (father); Mrs. Atwater (mother; deceased); Vanessa Atwater (sister); Jordan Atwater (brother); Unnamed brother Jane (aunt)
- Significant others: Celeste Nichols (ex-girlfriend); Laila Davis (fling); Val Soto (fling); Tasha Fox (fling)
- Children: Unborn child (with Tasha)
- Nationality: American

Police career
- Department: Chicago Police Department: Intelligence Unit (End of S1–present); Patrol (S1)
- Badge No.: 52784
- Radio Code: 5021 David

Portrayed by LaRoyce Hawkins

Officer Kevin Atwater is a police officer with the CPD's Intelligence Unit. He was previously a patrol officer at the 21st District.

Little is known about Atwater's background. His parents are either absent from his life or deceased and his younger siblings Jordan and Vanessa live with him as his "wards". His colleague Kim Burgess is one of his few colleagues whom they have regular contact with and it is implied that she has babysat Vanessa more than once. Like Joe Cruz from Chicago Fire, Atwater was raised in a gang-controlled neighborhood and had relatives and friends in prison but avoided a life of crime. He is known to the firefighters at 51 for throwing "great parties" and was once roped in to help organize a fundraiser at Molly's to help one of Lieutenant Severide's men.

During his time in patrol Atwater partnered with Burgess, who would later join him in Intelligence, and was usually the designated driver. Both Atwater and Burgess were constant targets of Desk Sergeant Platt's sarcasm. There was a running gag where Platt would assign them a different squad car if they talked back to her sarcastic remarks and mishaps would take place. In "Thirty Balloons", after going above and beyond in a hoarder deal, he and Burgess are given a new patrol car the district was given. They are told to keep it in mint condition since Commander Perry is going to drive it in a parade. However, when dealing with a drug mule, the mirror was wrecked when the drug mule tackled Atwater. He eventually uses an old connection from his neighborhood to fix the mirror in order to avoid Platt's wrath. They're able to keep it clean till the end of their shift until a construction worker drops a cinder block on the hood from 20 feet high while they're assisting on Intelligence's case. Before he was permanently transferred to the Intelligence Unit, he worked undercover with Alvin Olinsky.

At the end of season one, he is promoted to Hank Voight's Intelligence Unit. He is partnered with rookie Adam Ruzek, and they quickly become best friends. When Ruzek was engaged to Burgess, he asked Atwater to be his best man.

In "Prison Ball", he took a case personally when a 10-year-old girl was murdered by a suspect that she was supposed to be testifying against him. In the season 2 episode "There's My Girl", he is demoted back to being a uniformed officer following a suspect's suicide while in custody, when he left the soda can with the suspect in the interrogation room. In "Born into Bad News", after the Internal Affairs cleared him of the interrogation room incident, he is quickly promoted back to Intelligence.

In a Chicago Justice episode "Uncertainty Principle", when he goes to arrest the suspect for suspicions of drug dealing, he runs and Atwater gives chase and manages to arrest him, all of which is captured on video by some civilians. When the suspect later dies in jail, he was accused of killing him. Now State Attorney Chief Investigator Dawson arrests him in the 21st District, and Assistant State's Attorney Peter Stone is forced to file charges against him. During the investigation, it was found that he was killed in jail by another inmate and the charges were dropped. Peter Stone apologizes to him in court room for rushing to judgement.

In "Big Friends, Big Enemies", Burgess spots Atwater's younger brother, Jordan, while out visiting potential shooters and targets. Ever since, he keeps a close eye on him to see if he does not follow the wrong path.

In "Snitch", it is known that his little brother, Jordan, was born on October 18, 2002, when he, Burgess, and his friends were celebrating his 15th birthday and Atwater keeps a close relationship with the people in his community. During the investigation into the murder of a mini-mart owner, Roland, Atwater finds out that his brother was involved when he witnessed the murder and confronts him. He identified a gang banger named Curtis as the murder suspect and saw him throw the murder weapon in the nearby dumpster. Following a foot chase, Atwater eventually tracks down Curtis in an alley at gunpoint. Atwater encourages Curtis to go for his gun, which would give him a reason to shoot him, and Voight even suggests that Curtis could go for a second weapon on his ankle. But Atwater, in the end, does not pull the trigger and takes him in custody. In "Home", after his sister was attacked for the events that happened in "Snitch", he decides to let them move to Texas to ensure their safety. He still keeps in contact with them and misses them dearly.

In "Captive", in the middle of Trudy Platt's birthday karaoke party he receives a phone call in which prompts him to leave Molly's to check up on an anonymous person. Only to find out the person's house had been broken into, and another person holds Atwater at gunpoint and knocks him unconscious in which he ditches his badge. When Platt checks his phone, and gets the address of the tossed house, which is in the name of Joe Baker — a known drug dealer who has also gone missing. He was found chained to the ground in the abandoned church when Hailey finds a video on social media of Joe getting assaulted. When Atwater and Joe connect, it was revealed that seven years ago his son Ronnie Baker attempted to rob a store and murdered a clerk in the process after he gives chase and when he refuses to comply orders to surrender, he points his gun to Atwater, and he manages to shoot and kill him. Later found that Joe's sister Michelle had stayed in touch with him and told him to check on her brother. It was also revealed that the city of Chicago had paid Joe $20,000 in settlement which proves his doubt of Atwater's story. Atwater tearfully insists that he thinks about Joe's son every night before he goes to bed — but he also thinks about the clerk who Joe's son robbed, too. His captors were from a drug gang, Billy and Reimundo Morales who had accused them both of taking his drugs a few weeks earlier. And when Joe in revenge tries to his captors about his real identity, Atwater not only says he's a drug dealer, but claims he's the one who stole the cocaine to begin with. He ended up getting drilled in the leg by a power drill by Morales. Prior to the kidnapping, a girl named Elisa was brought in for questioning in which she confesses that she had drugged Joe and brought him to Morales. With one of the men shot dead by Antonio, Atwater manages to get himself and Joe to escape and eventually get into a fight with Morales for the gun. Joe comes to the rescue by shooting Morales with the service weapon he took off Atwater, that was knocked away in the fight. As soon as it over, Joe puts the gun to Atwater's head and demands to know the full story of his son's shooting. Atwater tries to convince Joe to put the gun down because he sees the rest of Intelligence coming into the room and does not want him to die too. Joe drops the weapon and gets carried to the hospital. Atwater asks him about the drug charges against him only to find out by Voight that Joe's friend Calvin Hill had stolen the drugs and set him up. Kevin tells Joe that his son's last words were about not getting on his knees for anyone, in which the same words that Joe put into his son's head. Atwater ends up consoling him.

In "Trigger", while working undercover in the mosque to investigate a bombing at an Army recruitment office, he is mistaken to be one of the combatants and is almost subjected to an enhanced interrogation before Voight and FBI Agent William Graff storm in, with Graff offering to apologize for his actions.

In "Night in Chicago", Atwater goes undercover and befriends a criminal named Daryl Ingram in order to take down the head of a criminal enterprise. While he and Daryl are in Daryl's car, they are pulled over by CPD Officers Tom Doyle and Jim Harper. During the stop, Doyle is overly aggressive with Atwater and Daryl, going as far saying racial slurs at them and drawing his gun, despite both of them being unarmed. They are arrested by the two officers on suspicion of robbery, but Daryl is shot and killed by Officer Doyle. Atwater is conflicted about what to say to Internal Affairs and the Civilian Office of Police Accountability, but it is revealed that Daryl did go for Officer Doyle's gun. Voight tells him to do what he thinks is right but to remember that he gets paid to be a cop, not to change the world. It is revealed that Atwater told the Civilian Office of Police Accountability that it was a clean shooting, clearing Doyle. Atwater meets with Doyle in a bar with the intent to fight him, doing so. He and Doyle fight, and it ends with Atwater putting his gun against Doyle's head, doing what Doyle did to him at the traffic stop.

In "Silence of the Night", Atwater is forced to pair up with Doyle, who was promoted to detective in Area South since the events of "Night in Chicago" to bring down a biker who was selling guns. While coming from a gun deal, Doyle stops a black man who he believes to be carrying a suspicious bag, and pursues him into a building, resulting in the deaths of the man and Doyle at the hands of two gang members. Atwater becomes conflicted since Doyle had no probable cause to stop the man and the gang members in the building who shot Doyle shot him in self defense since he was waving his service weapon around. Atwater proceeds to report that Doyle had no probable cause to stop the man, holding the knowledge that a wrongful death lawsuit of the man Doyle pursued will be initiated, a deep Internal Affairs investigation on Atwater and Doyle will occur, the city being sued for millions, and the family of Doyle (a third generation cop) as well as fellow officers who were his friends heavily monitoring and threatening him. At the end of the episode, Voight tells Atwater that he and Intelligence will support Atwater's decision before Atwater heads home to find multiple officers staking out his house.

The harassment continues in season 8, with the officers (led by Nolan) planting drugs in Kevin's car, beating him in the middle of the streets, breaking into his house, and refusing to send back-up that leads to Adam being wounded from a shot. Eventually Kevin has enough confronts Nolan in his house. Kevin threatens to quit his job and out Nolan as a racist and crooked cop, knowing full well that will ruin his reputation in the community and jeopardize his chances of a pension and his status with his family. This intimidated Nolan into backing off.

==== Crossovers ====
- Chicago Fire – "Let Her Go" (May 15, 2013)
- Chicago Fire – "A Problem House" (September 24, 2013)
- Chicago Fire – "Prove It" (October 1, 2013)
- Chicago Fire – "Tonight's the Night" (January 21, 2014)
- Chicago Fire – "A Dark Day" (April 29, 2014)
- Chicago Fire – "Just Drive the Truck" (October 7, 2014)
- Chicago Fire – "Ambush Predator" (January 13, 2015)
- Chicago Fire – "Short and Fat" (December 8, 2015)
- Chicago Fire – "I Will Be Walking" (April 19, 2016)
- Chicago Justice – "Uncertainty Principle" (March 5, 2017)
- Chicago Justice – "Drill" (April 23, 2017)
- Chicago Fire – "This Isn't Charity" (October 17, 2018)

=== Sean Roman ===
Sean Roman
- First appearance: CPD: "Call It Macaroni" (episode 2.01); CF: "Apologies Are Dangerous" (episode 3.04)
- Last appearance: CF: "Off the Grid" (episode 8.15); CPD: "Burden of Truth" (episode 7.15)
- Created by: Matt Olmstead
- Portrayed by: Brian Geraghty

In-universe information
- Occupation: Police officer, CPD; Owner of a private security firm
- Family: Mr. Roman (father); Mrs. Roman (mother); Sarah Roman (sister; deceased)
- Relatives: Tamra Riley (cousin)

Police career
- Department: Chicago Police Department: Patrol, 21st District (S2-S3); Patrol, 31st District (pre-S2)
- Rank: Officer

Portrayed by Brian Geraghty

Officer Sean Roman made his first appearance during the first episode of the second season "Call It Macaroni", which was broadcast on September 24, 2014. Roman is a police officer in the Chicago Police Department's 21st District. He has also made recurring appearances in Chicago Fire.

He is a brash patrol officer who partners with Kim Burgess after transferring to "the 2-1" from District 31. He transferred out because of his relationship with Jenn Cassidy (who is now a K-9 officer), to avoid breaking fraternization rules. He has his own private security company on the side.

Roman runs a security business and recruits cops who wish to earn extra money after hours. He offers Antonio a job as he knew the latter was going through a divorce and was mortgaging the house to pay for lawyer fees. In "Assignment of the Year", Roman did not know Asher was a felon, and his immaturity shows in his inexperience. Since Roman was heavily involved with the unit on this case, he had to cooperate with the unit in apprehending Asher's killer, which was Asher's own wife who seduced her errand boy, Terry, into committing the murder and allowing herself to escape prosecution.

In "Prison Ball", while he and Burgess unknowingly supervising three juvenile delinquents in the Police Explorers program, Al Olinsky bumps into them, Roman gives Olinsky attitude and he demands to know what Roman's problem is. It was revealed that years ago, while in District 31, in an undercover sting his partner and he were both shot and Olinsky was there. Roman's partner ended up being paralyzed because Olinsky did not help him and thought it was more important to chase after the shooter. While Roman is having a meltdown, he loses the Police Explorers. Burgess and Roman learn that the Explorers were actually juvenile delinquents, and they stole the commander's squad car.

In "Called in Dead", while Roman and his ex-girlfriend, Jenn Cassidy, now a K-9 officer, were arguing outside, Burgess gets shot investigating a call when she rang the doorbell, which was connected via trip wire to a shotgun.

In "Shouldn't Have Been Alone", upon investigation it was revealed that the house itself was booby-trapped by the murderer, Spencer York. During the investigation, Adam Ruzek and Roman get into a confrontation because Ruzek believes that it was Roman's fault that Burgess is in the hospital.

In "We Don't Work Together Anymore", while Burgess is on desk duty to take care of herself, Roman was partnered with Sergeant Platt.

In "What Do You Do", Burgess and Roman (while on meal break) investigate a suspicious activity in a warehouse, which was later revealed to be a drug deal. Roman gained medical experience when he was forced at gunpoint to help a suspect that was shot and was in serious condition. Although Burgess was scared and Roman was seriously injured during the whole ordeal, they are eventually saved when Ruzek, while he and his unit are getting mandatory taser certification, notices that Burgess had not responded to his messages.

In "The Three Gs", Roman gets into a physical altercation with a fellow officer, Officer DeLuca, while deciding on methods of how to save a girl's life, after she was shot by a stray bullet in the midst of the gunfight between the suspect with connections to the human trafficking case and Olinsky. Roman is suspended in the process when DeLuca decides to file a formal complaint against him, but it is lifted when Hank Voight forces him to drop the complaint.

Roman's father is a Vietnam veteran who served in the 5th Marine Regiment.

In "There's My Girl", it was revealed that Sean has a cousin that works with the stone carving business when the department turns down an offer to carve a stone for Nadia.

In "Justice", he was shot in the patrol car alongside Burgess. During a short foot pursuit, she was able to shoot the suspect.

In "She's Got Us", while waiting to be reinstated as a patrol officer, he learns that nerve damage to his left arm has ended his police career.

In "Start Digging", rather than take a desk job, he decides to go to San Diego and stay in his cousin's guest house. He wanted Burgess to come with him but she chose to stay. They share their last kiss, and Roman settles his feud with Adam Ruzek.

Roman returns in the February 2020 Chicago crossover event, where he returns to Chicago to find his sister Sarah, who disappeared the week prior. Initially working with Kelly Severide to find her, he is forced to later work with the Intelligence Unit and Burgess after it is revealed that he failed to contact Intelligence at Severide's request and is later found escaping the scene of a fire exchanging gunfire with a suspect. After he finds Sarah frozen to death, he goes on to avenge her death by killing the drug dealer she was working for and framing a rival drug dealer by having a former confidential informant make a false tip. Initially expecting to be arrested after being linked to the crime scene by Burgess, he is let off the hook by Voight, who looks the other way.

==== Crossovers ====
He has appeared on Chicago Fire to apprehend suspects.

- Chicago Fire – "Apologies Are Dangerous" (October 14, 2014)
- Chicago Fire – "Three Bells" (February 3, 2015)
- Chicago Fire – "Headlong Toward Disaster" (February 17, 2015)
- Chicago Fire – "Forgiving, Relentless, Unconditional" (March 17, 2015)
- Law & Order: Special Victims Unit – "Daydream Believer" (April 29, 2015)
- Chicago Fire – "Spartacus" (May 12, 2015)
- Chicago Fire – "I Walk Away" (October 27, 2015)
- Chicago Fire – "Off the Grid" (February 26, 2020)

=== Sheldon Jin ===
Sheldon Jin †
- First appearance: CPD: "Stepping Stone" (episode 1.1)
- Last appearance: CPD: "A Beautiful Friendship" (episode 1.15)
- Portrayed by: Archie Kao

In-universe information
- Family: Andrew Jin (father); Susan Jin (mother)

Police career
- Department: Chicago Police Department: Intelligence Unit
- Rank: Detective

Portrayed by Archie Kao

Sheldon Jin was the Intelligence Unit's "tech wizard" and analyst. He is highly skilled in using technology to aid the investigations. He is the only member of the team who does not routinely carry a firearm or go out to the field and is usually in his office at the 21st District headquarters, only going to the crime scene when his expertise is needed.

Toward the end of season 1, it is revealed that Voight's Internal Affairs handler Sergeant Edwin Stillwell has been blackmailing Jin into "spying" on the Intelligence Unit, particularly Voight. Jin's father had accumulated a large gambling debt and Stillwell threatened to deport his father back to China if he (Jin) did not cooperate. Voight was initially furious upon finding out about Jin, although it lessens some after he discovers the link with IA, whom Voight had a history of bad blood with. He is killed by Stillwell in "A Beautiful Friendship" and found out by the Silos. Prior to his death, Jin mailed Halstead a thumbdrive with information incriminating Stillwell, leading to his arrest. Jin was honored with a plaque outside the 21st District headquarters.

=== Trudy Platt ===
Trudy Platt
- First appearance: CF: "A Rocket Blasting Off" (episode 2.16); CPD: "Stepping Stone" (episode 1.1)
- Portrayed by: Amy Morton

In-universe information
- Nicknames: Gertrude, Tru
- Occupation: Sergeant, CPD
- Family: Robert Platt (father; deceased); Logan Platt (half-brother)
- Spouses: Randy "Mouch" McHolland

Police career
- Department: Chicago Police Department: Robbery Homicide Unit; 21st District (Desk Sergeant)
- Years of service: 1991–present
- Rank: Sergeant
- Badge No.: 31116
- Radio Code: 21-02 Squad. (S7 E13)

Portrayed by Amy Morton

Sergeant Gertrude "Trudy" Platt-McHolland is the desk sergeant at District 21. As the desk sergeant, she is the immediate superior of the district's patrol officers. She was previously a training officer (Antonio Dawson was one of her trainees during his days walking the beat) and had passed the detective's exam twice but had to take a desk job after being shot. She is known for her sarcasm and deadpan humor. She sometimes comes off as cold and heartless, however, she deeply cares for the officers under her command and is shown to go to great lengths to defend them. This is greatly shown when an officer she assigned to guard duty is murdered execution-style by a criminal, she feels very guilty but is moved when many officers show up at the district to support the grieving family. At the beginning of season 1, she often tries to bully Officer Kim Burgess into running errands for her. When Burgess finally tells her off, Platt intentionally assigns Burgess and partner Kevin Atwater to a smelly squad car for the day. Burgess's new partner Sean Roman once called Platt a "pain in the ass".

In the episode "Turn the Light Off", it is revealed that Platt comes from a wealthy family. Her family disapproved of her decision to become a police officer. Every now and then, she would bring a "fiancé" to convince her father to continue subsidizing her lifestyle that exceeds her police officer salary. She convinces Adam Ruzek to play the fiancé, and Ruzek takes the opportunity to eat at an expensive restaurant. She also has history with Voight and Olinsky; she once told Antonio that Voight is the best cop in the city, they hold a close working friendship, and despite Olinsky being her subordinate he is allowed to call her by her first name.

Platt meets firefighter Randy "Mouch" McHolland at Chief Boden's wedding at Firehouse 51 and they strike up a friendship almost immediately. He eventually proposes marriage and Platt is sure her dad will spare no cost for his daughter's wedding. Their wedding plans are thrown off course when her father reveals that he is bankrupt due to bad deals and investments gone wrong, meaning that she would have to rely on her own finances. It is also implied that while Platt is financially independent, she has long relied on her family's money as back-up and now has to scale back her lifestyle due to her meager salary. They eventually marry in an intimate ceremony at Molly's in the Chicago Fire episode "On the Warpath" and had their honeymoon in 'God's Country', the Wisconsin Dells.

In "All Cylinders Firing", Trudy has dinner with her father at his house. Platt leaves the house so she can be back in time to meet her husband for end of shift and as she unlocks her car door, she is struck in the head and repeatedly beaten. The assailant escapes with her handgun. Neighbors realize she is lying on the ground, so they call 911 and she manages to tell them that the guy has her gun and she is a cop. Mouch arrives and he wants to know who did this to her. He cannot recall where she said she was going. They question him if it is possible that she was with another guy. She refers to her father as a "hardass" when she escorts the suspect's nephew on a date to meet with him. When Ruzek and Olinsky catch a break with regards to Platt's father, Robert Platt, they break down his door only to find him on the ground dead with multiple gunshot wounds. During the investigation, it was revealed that he was beaten up in order to get information on Platt's whereabouts. It was revealed that his much younger girlfriend, Natalie, along with her boyfriend, Leonard, were in on a scam to steal his money. But she wanted Platt dead because she was suspicious of her and had her boyfriend commit the attack only to complicate it even further when she was not killed. When Burgess gives an update on her case, and asks Platt about the car, Trust lies by denying she knew whose car it was. The car belongs to Wade McGregor, who also worked for Platt's father. When Erin Lindsay arrives at the hospital with the file to find both Platt and her hospital detail officer gone, she calls Voight to tell him. Trudy arrives in her dad's office and gets a gun, after she grabs Wade McGregor's name off the Rolodex. She also smashes a display case and takes a golden shovel out of it. Platt now knows who they are after. Voight says they need to bring her in quietly, and they need to find both before someone gets killed. Wade McGregor is packed up and ready to go, when he turns around to see Trudy standing with her gun drawn. She picks up her other gun and says “Thanks”. She throws handcuffs at him. Platt brings McGregor to a vacant building, where she says she knows about him cutting corners on her dad's buildings and that he was selling cocaine and laundered proceeds to his job sites. He says her dad robbed him blind. Platt wants to know what her father's last words were, McGregor says he does not remember. She puts a rag in his mouth and duct tapes it shut. The next thing we see is Platt cleaning up in the bathroom, with her gun in her hand. She comes out to Voight telling her they need to talk. Voight yells back that she is not him. She breaks down in his arms and cries out that he killed her dad. At the end of the episode, Platt is back in the hospital resting and her husband, Mouch, is there.

In "Fagin", Hailey Upton asks if she remembers her but she did not. But later on, she remembers that on February 9, 2003, Platt answered a call at a diner, where a guy came in and pistol whipped the owner when he was closing up, almost killing him—all for $272.57. Platt remembers she was working in the robbery/homicide squad at the time. Upton recalls that she sat at Platt's desk all night until the robber was finally caught. Right before she leaves the front desk, she remarks to Trudy that she is the reason Hailey became a police officer.

In "Captive", it is implied that her birthday is on January 17 when her colleagues threw her a karaoke birthday party.

In "Profiles", while being interviewed on live TV by a news anchor, she was injured by a bombing in a TV studio that was later revealed to be meant for the deceased anchor. She was later comforted by her husband, Mouch.

In the Chicago Fire episode "A Real Shot in the Arm", Mouch uses his and Platt's savings to buy out Otis' shares of Molly's, making her a co-owner of the bar.

==== Crossovers ====
Platt also appears in Chicago Fire as a recurring character. She meets firefighter Randy "Mouch" McHolland in season 2 and they begin a relationship. Mouch has also appeared in Chicago P.D.

- Chicago Fire: "A Rocket Blasting Off" (October 14, 2014)
- Chicago Fire: "Until Your Feet Leave the Ground" (April 8, 2014)
- Chicago Fire: "Real Never Waits" (May 13, 2014)
- Chicago Fire: "Always" (September 23, 2014)
- Chicago Fire: "Just Drive the Truck" (October 7, 2014)
- Chicago Fire: "The Nuclear Option" (October 21, 2014)
- Chicago Fire: "Arrest in Transit" (November 25, 2014)
- Chicago Fire: "Red Rag the Bull" (March 3, 2015)
- Chicago Fire: "Forgive You Anything" (March 10, 2015)
- Chicago Fire: "A Taste of Panama City" (October 20, 2015)
- Chicago Fire: "The Beating Heart" (January 5, 2016)

=== Alvin Olinsky ===
Alvin Olinsky †
- First appearance: CF: "You Will Hurt Him" (episode 2.9); CPD: "Stepping Stone" (episode 1.1)
- Last appearance: "More" (episode 11.13)
- Portrayed by: Elias Koteas

In-universe information
- Nicknames: Al, "O"
- Spouse: Meredith Olinsky
- Children: Lexi Olinsky (daughter; deceased); Michelle Sovana (purported daughter)

Police career
- Department: Chicago Police Department: Intelligence Unit; Gang Unit; Organized Crime (pre-series); DEA Task Force
- Years of service: 1990–2018
- Rank: Senior Detective
- Badge No.: 50037

Portrayed by Elias Koteas

Senior Detective Alvin Olinsky was a seasoned detective in the Intelligence Unit and Voight's most experienced team member as well as his best friend. Before joining the force, Olinsky served in the United States Army and was at one time stationed in Vicenza, Italy with the 173rd Airborne Brigade Combat Team. Olinsky mentions in "Called in Dead" that he has eight confirmed kills in the line of duty. He is one of two military veterans in the Intelligence Unit – the other being Jay Halstead, an Afghanistan veteran – and the duo sometimes exchange banter about each other's service.

In season 1, Olinsky becomes estranged from his wife, who made him move into the garage for some time, before they eventually reconciled and he is allowed to move back into the house. When Lexi is falsely accused of possessing marijuana, Olinsky is quick to help his daughter out. Even though she is suspended from school, the two have a father/daughter dance in the garage. When an ill-fated party ends in a gang member's shooting death, Lexi is the only witness. Olinsky tries to prevent Lexi from becoming a witness as it would endanger her life. However, when the shooter refuses to confess, Lexi volunteers.

In the Season 2 finale, "Born into Bad News", Alvin is contacted by a young girl from the juvenile center named Michelle and reveals her status as his second daughter. Alvin meets her in "Life Is Fluid", where he gets her out of Juvie.

During most of season 3, he starts bonding with her, starting to accept him as her as his daughter at the cost of being kicked out by his angry wife.

In the season 4 three-show crossover starting with the Chicago Fire episode "Deathtrap", Lexi is killed in a fire which the CFD later determined to be arson. In "Emotional Proximity", when the suspect is in custody, he, along with Voight, makes up a lie on the police report that states that he had confessed to them. In the Chicago Justice premiere, "Fake", ASA Peter Stone rebuts that statement in court when Voight has to testify. The case was closed resulting in the arsonist being found guilty of first-degree murder. Olinsky returns to work in the next episode.

In "You Never Know Who's Who", during the investigation in the murder of a former CIA agent, he worked undercover as a contact from CIA headquarters. He was shot and wounded when one of the suspects recognized that his identity was false. The suspect was later shot and killed by Antonio.

Olinsky has a long history with Voight, having been partnered with him in a gang unit years earlier. Olinsky's partner was killed by a man named Browning, and Olinsky and Voight "took him for a boat ride".

Although usually calm and reserved, he has been shown to have a temper and is not above using questionable tactics to bring a suspect to justice.

Because Olinsky's desk is behind Halstead and Atwater, there is a running gag where Voight and the rest of the unit miss him entering the room. Voight briefs the team and tells them to pass on the information to Olinsky "when he gets here", only for Olinsky to roll out on his chair and say "here".

In "Breaking Point", he is taken into custody for questioning by Internal Affairs when his DNA comes up on the body of Kevin Bingham, the killer of Hank Voight's son, Justin. When the detectives asked him about his DNA, he requested a lawyer. Lieutenant Denny Woods tries to get information from him in order to put Voight in jail, by offering him immunity, but he leaves Woods's office, turning down the offer. With the possibility that he might get arrested, he has a temptation to either betray Voight's loyalty or take the deal.

In "Payback", he and Voight get a tip on who the witness is following from Voight's favor to the Ivory Tower, a junkie named Ruben who tried to break into Olinsky's car a while back. He gives Voight the witness's address, and Voight tells him to not get involved. Voight asks Olinsky about his retirement papers being filed. Olinsky then claims he is not retiring; he just wants to use the paperwork as a flare to see if Internal Affairs will make a move. Voight then admits he is not going to be able to bend Ruben because he is a recovering addict who is turning his life around. At the end, from an "anonymous" tip made to Narcotics, Ruben gets arrested with drugs that were planted on him by Olinsky. He maintained his innocence in front of his wife while Olinsky, watches from his car across the street thus damaging the witness's credibility. In "Saved", he revealed that the witness, Ruben, was later released due to lack of evidence.

In "Allegiance", he was indicted by a grand jury for the murder of Kevin Bingham that was convened on "Saved" and was arrested by two Internal Affairs detectives in front of his fellow detectives. At the end, he was stabbed in prison by an inmate. In "Homecoming", he was soon discovered by corrections officers and rushed to the hospital but died as a result of his injuries. As the investigation into murder goes forward, it was revealed to be a hit by a drug runner for the Cali Cartel that Olinsky was trying to take down while he was in a DEA task force who arrested his brother. His brother ended up killed in prison, and a corrections officer that confided in him was also in on the hit.

In season 11, Olinsky appears as an hallucination to Voight as he is undergoing torture.

==== Crossovers ====
Like many Chicago P.D. characters, Olinsky has appeared in Chicago Fire. He was the handler of Leon Cruz, younger brother of CFD firefighter Joe Cruz, and was assigned to make sure Leon, who was undercover in a gang, was safe. He also was a guest at Platt's and Mouch's wedding in "On the Warpath".

- Chicago Fire – "You Will Hurt Him" (December 3, 2013)
- Chicago Fire – "On the Warpath" (April 5, 2016)
- Chicago Med – "Extreme Measures" (October 20, 2016)
- Chicago Fire – "Deathtrap" (March 1, 2017)
- Chicago Justice – "Fake" (March 1, 2017)
- Chicago Med – "Naughty or Nice" (December 12, 2017)
- Chicago Med – "Down By Law" (February 27, 2018)

=== Hailey Upton ===
Hailey Upton
- Chicago P.D. character
- First appearance: Chicago P.D.: "Fagin" (episode 4.21)
- Last appearance: Chicago P.D.: "Reckoning, Part III" (episode 13.13)
- Created by: Matt Olmstead
- Portrayed by: Tracy Spiridakos

In-universe information
- Full name: Hailey Anne Upton
- Gender: Female
- Family: Unnamed father Unnamed mother Unnamed brothers
- Spouse: Jay Halstead (m. 2021; div. 2024)
- Significant other: Adam Ruzek (ex-boyfriend)
- Relatives: Will Halstead (former brother-in-law)
- Nationality: American
- Date of birth: 1990 or 1991

Police career
- Department: Chicago Police Department (formerly): Robbery-Homicide (formerly ); Intelligence Unit (formerly); Federal Bureau of Investigation: Detroit Field Office
- Years of service: 2009–2024
- Rank: Detective
- Badge No.: 55055
- Radio Code: 5021 Henry

Portrayed by Tracy Spiridakos

Detective Hailey Anne Upton-Halstead joins the Intelligence Unit from the Robbery-Homicide Division on a joint case. She later accepts a position in the unit to fill in for Kim Burgess and later replaces Erin Lindsay following her departure for the FBI's Counter-Terrorism Bureau in New York. As a young girl, her father, the owner of a diner in Greektown, was attacked and robbed by an unknown shooter. After being threatened by the robber, Hailey spent the night at the desk of Trudy Platt when Platt was a detective in the Robbery-Homicide Division. Platt made her feel safe as her father recovered from the attack and inspired Hailey to become a cop. It is revealed that she was meritoriously promoted to detective after a year-long undercover assignment. She attended the University of Chicago. Upton has a history of dating her colleagues: Garrett Thomas, her sergeant whom she was undercover with before she was promoted to detective, Adam Ruzek, and her partner Jay Halstead. Upton also has a history of domestic violence at the hands of her father, starting from when she was little.

In season 5, Upton is partnered with Jay Halstead. The partnership between the two is initially rocky during the first half of the season since Halstead has been trying to get over the departure of his ex-girlfriend and long-time former partner, Erin Lindsay. They gradually become good friends and confidants, indicated by the fact that it is to her that Halstead finally opens up about his PTSD.

In "Snitch", when she sees Ruzek assaulting a suspect in public, she manages to pull Ruzek aside and get him in the car. When he is investigated by Internal Affairs about what happened, Ruzek accuses her of going to Internal Affairs. It is later revealed she managed to convince the suspect's child's mother to have him drop the charges.

In "Fallen", she is partnered with Vice Sergeant Sean McGrady, who has problems with her. During the search of Quinton Kane, a drug dealer with a likely connection to the murder of a family, he returns to help with the investigation. But when Upton goes to meet with McGrady, he ends up dead, and Voight chastizes Upton for letting McGrady come to the scene alone. She's thrown, explaining that she had told him to wait for her and that she was ten minutes ahead of the time they had planned to meet, but Voight blows her off. As a result, the officers including his former partner and McGrady's widow and family ending up turning their backs on her. During the investigation, Upton calls for a private meeting with Voight and shows him a sign-in sheet with McGrady's signature that proves McGrady was in Chicago PD's lab, where a vial of Quinton Kane's blood was kept but is now missing. Upton believes McGrady framed Kane for murder when he killed himself to escape his mounting debt. Voight apologizes and then asks her if she wants to tarnish McGrady's legacy and ruin his family over the “jackass” that was a suspect in the family's murder. So, she agrees to stay quiet about what had happened.

In "Confidential", she and Burgess butt heads about how to handle confidential informants when Burgess's confidential informant informs them about a dead body, which Burgess does not believe but Upton decides to investigate. It turns out that she was right and it leads to sex trafficking, and the informant turns up dead. Upton goes to her CI and she does not push the informant further citing that the informant has a family. Burgess has a problem with how she handles the situation.

In "Ghosts", when a drug bust goes awry, she recognizes that one of the victims is someone that she knows from her undercover assignment before joining Intelligence. She suspects that the man she was undercover busting, Ron Booth, is back in business. He immediately becomes the prime suspect and Upton suggests that she goes back undercover to get into his warehouse. Booth still knows her as an Iowa girl named "Kelly". It turns personal when she also suspects that he killed her former partner. It is revealed that while working undercover on New Year's Eve, at a party that Booth hosted, he drunkenly tried to rape her. She got away from him before he could, and her former partner got her to the hospital. He then gets obsessive over her when he asks "Ryan" (undercover Halstead) if he slept with her and cuts ties with him. When Voight tells her to stop the investigation, she disobeys his orders and agrees to meet with him without Halstead knowing. After the meeting, Halstead confronts her for being "too emotional" with this case. During the meeting with Booth at a parking lot, he checks Upton to see if she is wearing a wire but instead gropes her. Booth's nephew got nervous when Halstead starts to make his move and draws his gun but gets shot dead by Halstead. With the chaos, Booth runs to the stairwell with Upton giving chase, and the two end up fighting to gain control. Upton ends up getting the upper hand, and beats Booth, and demands that he admit to the murder of her former partner. He does not, so she contemplates shooting him before Halstead arrives to stop her. At the end of the episode, Halstead goes to Upton's apartment to console her.

In "Bad Boys", she and Ruzek begin a relationship but keep it a secret from the other members in Intelligence. They make their relationship public in "True or False" when Voight finds out after they respond to an early-morning call together. They break up in "Sacrifice" due to their careers and unspoken feelings for other people.

In season 7 episodes 9–10, Halstead ends up getting kidnapped, causing Upton to get scared and reevaluate her feelings for him. When they are leaving the hospital, Upton tries to tell Halstead how she feels, but the two get interrupted causing her to get discouraged and back down.

In "Informant", her informant is murdered in front of her, and it is implied that Voight's CI Darius Walker murdered him to avoid being identified as a confidential informant after accidentally being spotted by Upton's informant. Upton proceeds to avenge his death after implying Walker was the one responsible for setting up the deaths of gang members and cops in a drug deal while asking questions about the said crime.

In "Lines", Upton is temporarily assigned to fill in for an agent undercover at the FBI's New York Field Office by Voight as punishment for planting drugs in a drug lord's car to protect Rojas and ensure that Rojas's friend receives a deal for his participation.

In season 8 episode 3, "Tender Age", Upton is offered a permanent job in NY by the FBI but declines, telling Halstead that he and the rest of the unit make her a better person and that she wants to stay in Chicago. She then tells Halstead that she hasn't seen him as a partner in a long time, and the two share their first kiss.

In the season finale, "The Other Side", Burgess gets kidnapped and the unit scrambles to find her, splitting up into two separate teams to find her "the right way" and "the wrong way". When Upton realizes that Voight has found Burgess's kidnapper, Roy Walton, she goes after him to prevent Voight from killing him. She succeeds in getting Voight to bring Walton in after the others found Burgess, but when Voight goes to undo Walton's restraints, he grabs Voight's gun, leaving Upton no choice but to shoot and kill Walton. Voight tells Upton to go home and that he will take care of the body. When she gets to her apartment, she finds Halstead there getting ready to go to the hospital to check on an unconscious Burgess. Upton stops him, tells him she loves him, and asks him to marry her.

In the season 9 premiere, Upton and Halstead arrive at the hospital to learn that Burgess is in critical condition. The team is sent to find a seemingly MIA Walton by the Deputy Superintendent (whose son was murdered by Walton). Upton starts to get nervous because the investigation willmost likely lead to her and Voight. Voight tells her to get a grip and that everything will be fine. The episode ends with Halstead and Upton getting engaged, the team "unable to find Walton", and the case being handed over to the FBI. They attempt to keep their relationship discreet; however, their colleagues later reveal that they have already known about the relationship but chose not to comment out of respect for their privacy.

In "In the Dark", Upton's guilt over her secret about killing Walton comes to a tipping point. She has a panic attack about the shooting after a suspect in the unit's current case, attempts to commit suicide in the interrogation room due to her revealing too much information. Halstead concludes that Voight had something to do with Walton's sudden disappearance and confronts him. Halstead learns of the events that occurred and punches Voight. He goes home to a sleeping Hailey who wakes up and realizes that Halstead knows everything.

In the season 11 premiere, "Unpacking", Hailey and Jay have gotten divorced as Hailey filed the divorce papers as she walked out of the station. In the season 11 finale, "More", Upton must make a vital decision to leave the team as she researches jobs at the FBI, FEMA, and DEA. She then packs up her apartment and gets in a taxi to Chicago O'Hare Airport.

==== Crossovers ====
- Chicago Fire – "Hiding Not Seeking" (March 8, 2018)
- Chicago Med – "The Poison Inside Us" (November 7, 2018)
- Chicago Fire – "What I Saw" (February 20, 2019)
- Chicago Fire – "Move a Wall" (March 27, 2019)
- FBI – "Emotional Rescue" (March 31, 2020)

=== Vanessa Rojas ===
Vanessa Rojas
- First appearance: CPD: "Assets" (episode 7.02)
- Last appearance: CPD: "Silence of the Night"" (episode 7.20)
- Portrayed by: Lisseth Chavez

Police career
- Department: Chicago Police Department: Undercover; Intelligence Unit
- Rank: Police officer

Portrayed by Lisseth Chavez

Officer Vanessa Rojas is an officer who joins the Intelligence Unit from a long-term investigations unit and later replaces Antonio Dawson following his resignation from the Chicago Police Department and relocation to Puerto Rico. She makes her debut in "Assets" as Nina Rodriguez, a bartender for one of Darius Walker's bar that Kevin Atwater and the Intelligence have infiltrated. When Atwater tries to set up a deal with her, it is later revealed that she's a CPD officer working in an undercover operations unit. She is assigned to Intelligence in "Familia", where she gets off to a rocky start after her pursuit of a carjacker on her first day ends in the carjacker's death and Intelligence assigned the case, much to Voight's dismay.

It is revealed that she lived in 32 different foster homes growing up and that she was homeless at the time when she joined Intelligence, having been living out of her car and her undercover apartment. With her undercover assignment over, she no longer had a place to stay but was hesitant to ask for help. Hailey Upton noticed and offered her extra room. They have been housemates ever since. She left Chicago PD in the Season 7 Finale "Silence of the Night".

=== Dante Torres ===
Dante Torres
- First appearance: CPD: "New Guard" (episode 9.18)
- Portrayed by: Benjamin Levy Aguilar

In-universe information
- Gender: Male
- Title: 50-21 Ocean
- Family: Catalina Torres (mother); Berto (stepfather; deceased)
- Significant others: Gloria Perez (fling; deceased); Jimena Sanz (fling)

Police career
- Department: Chicago Police Department: Intelligence Unit
- Years of service: 2022–present
- Rank: Police officer

Portrayed by Benjamin Levy Aguilar

Officer Dante Torres (season 10 – present; guest season 9) is an officer who Jay Halstead took under his wing and later joins the Intelligence Unit. He makes his debut on "New Guard" as a new recruit and later joins Intelligence Unit on "Let It Bleed".

=== Kiana Cook ===
Kiana Cook
- Chicago P.D. character
- First appearance: Chicago P.D.: Blood Bleeds Blue (episode 12.02)
- Last appearance: Chicago P.D.: Vows (episode 12.22)
- Created by: Matt Olmstead
- Portrayed by: Toya Turner

In-universe information
- Full name: Kiana Cook
- Gender: Female
- Occupation: Police officer
- Family: William Cook (father); Patricia Dixon (mother); Unnamed maternal grandfather

Police career
- Department: Chicago Police Department: 17th District; Intelligence Unit (S12); Patrol (formerly)
- Rank: Officer
- Badge No.: 51339
- Radio Code: 921 Squad; 5021 King

Portrayed by Toya Turner

Officer Kiana Cook (season 12) joins the Intelligence Unit following Hailey Upton's departure.

=== Eva Imani ===
Eva Imani
- Chicago P.D. character
- First appearance: Chicago P.D.: Consequences (episode 13.01)
- Created by: Matt Olmstead
- Portrayed by: Arienne Mandi

In-universe information
- Full name: Eva Imani
- Gender: Female
- Occupation: Police officer
- Family: Unnamed father (deceased); Unnamed mother (deceased); Shari Imani (sister)
- Date of birth: 1996

Police career
- Department: Chicago Police Department: Intelligence Unit (S13-present); Bureau of Alcohol, Tobacco and Firearms (formerly): ATF Agent (formerly)
- Rank: Officer
- Badge No.: 40894
- Radio Code: 5021 Union

Portrayed by Arienne Mandi

Officer Eva Imani (season 13 – present) joins the Intelligence Unit following Kiana Cook's departure.

== Recurring ==
| Name | Portrayed by | Seasons | | | | | | | | | | | |
| Name | Portrayed by | 1 | 2 | 3 | 4 | 5 | 6 | 7 | 8 | 9 | 10 | 11 | 12 |
|---|---|---|---|---|---|---|---|---|---|---|---|---|---|
| Nadia Decotis | Stella Maeve | Recurring | | | | | | | | | | | |
| Justin Voight | Josh Segarra | Recurring | Guest | Recurring | | | | | | | | | |
| Edwin Stillwell | Ian Bohen | Recurring | Guest | | | | | | | | | | |
| Ron Perry | Robert Wisdom | Recurring | Guest | | | | | | | | | | |
| Dr. Alec Willhite | Erik Hellman | Recurring | Guest | | | | | | | | | | |
| Laura Dawson | America Olivo | Recurring | | | | | Guest | | | | | | |
| Detective Sumners | Sydney Tamiia Poitier | Recurring | | | | | | | | | | | |
| Erica Gradishar | Robin Weigert | Recurring | | | | | | | | | | | |
| Greg Gerwitz | Samuel Hunt | Guest | Recurring | | | | | | | | | | |
| Medical Examiner Ruth Dwyer | Kathy Scambiatterra | Guest | | | Recurring | | | Guest | | | | | |
| Meredith Olinsky | Melissa Carlson | Guest | | Recurring | Guest | | | | | | | | |
| Medical Examiner | Celeste M Cooper | Guest | | Recurring | | | Guest | | | | | | |
| ASA Steve Kot | Chris Agos | | Recurring | | | Guest | | | | | | | |
| Barbara 'Bunny' Fletcher | Markie Post | | Recurring | | | | | | | | | | |
| Commander Fischer | Kevin J. O'Connor | | Recurring | Guest | | | | | | | | | |
| Michelle Sovana | Madison McLaughlin | | Guest | Recurring | | | | | | | | | |
| Emma Crowley | Barbara Eve Harris | | | Recurring | | | | | | | | | |
| Kenny Rixton | Nick Wechsler | | | | Recurring | | | | | | | | |
| Denny Woods | Mykelti Williamson | | | | Guest | Recurring | | | | | | | |
| Ray Price | Wendell Pierce | | | | | Recurring | | Guest | | | | | |
| First Deputy Superintendent Katherine Brennan | Anne Heche | | | | | | Recurring | Guest | | | | | |
| Brian Kelton | John C. McGinley | | | | | | Recurring | | | | | | |
| Superintendent Jason Crawford | Paul Adelstein | | | | | | | Recurring | | | | | |
| Darius Walker | Michael Beach | | | | | | | Recurring | | | | | |
| Makayla Ward | Ramona Edith Williams | | | | | | | | Recurring | | | | |
| Deputy Superintendent Samantha Miller | Nicole Ari Parker | | | | | | | | Recurring | | | | |
| Anna Avalos | Carmela Zumbado | | | | | | | | | Recurring | | | |
| ASA Nina Chapman | Sara Bues | | | | | | | | | Guest | Recurring | | Guest |
| Chief Patrick O'Neal | Michael Gaston | | | | | | | | | | Recurring | | |
| Frank Matson | Dennis Flanagan | | | | | | | | | | | Recurring | |

=== Family members ===
- Justin Voight (Josh Segarra) was the son of Detective Sergeant Henry "Hank" Voight and his late wife Camille. He was one of fraternal twins; his twin sister was stillborn. Father and son have a strained relationship due to Justin frequently getting into trouble. He is first mentioned in Chicago Fire when Chief Boden's firefighters rescue a boy and his father who were in a near fatal accident caused by Justin's drunk driving. After finding out that the boy is now a paraplegic, a furious Lieutenant Matthew Casey, whose truck company had responded to the call, files a complaint and is threatened by Detective Voight into retracting his statement. The incident would lead to a long-running grudge match between the two. Justin had other run-ins with the law and did a short stint in prison. His father and foster sister Erin Lindsay have tried to set him straight, to no avail. Eventually his father forces him to enlist in the U.S. Army to learn discipline and avoid gangs and the bad influence of his recently released former cellmate. After Justin's departure, Voight is accosted by Justin's girlfriend Olive Morgan because she had not heard from the latter for some time (she presumably did not know that Voight had forced Justin to enlist on the spot). Upon learning that Olive is pregnant with Justin's child, Voight reaches out to her. Olive is coerced into luring Voight out by vengeful criminals and nearly dies. She and the baby survive the attack with the men being dealt with by Intelligence. Justin briefly returns to Chicago on leave after hearing about the incident and assures his father that he will declare Olive as his dependent and have her move in with him. Voight gives him Camille's ring for whenever Justin intends to "[make] an honest woman of her". In season 3 it is revealed that Olive gave birth to a boy named Daniel and that she and Justin did get married. In the season 3 finale, Justin is seriously injured after trying to help the widow of one of his Army buddies and is left in a coma. He never regained consciousness and is taken off life support with consent from his father. Hank avenges his son's death by going after his murderer and kills him.
- Lexi Olinsky (Alina Jenine Taber) was the daughter of Detective Alvin Olinsky. In "Now Is Always Temporary", she is suspended by her school after they find joints in her locker. It is later revealed that she was holding for her boyfriend, and that Olinsky had managed to get the truth out of the boyfriend. She forgave him and they had a father daughter dance in the driveway. In "A Material Witness", she is the sole witness in a gang shooting and testifies against the suspect despite her father's and the Intelligence Unit's advice to not testify to avoid being targeted. She dies in "Emotional Proximity" after suffering serious burn injuries in a warehouse fire that was arson. Despite best efforts by Chicago Med doctors and nurses, including Dr. Halstead, she suffers multi-organ failure and her parents are with her when she passes away.
- Michelle Sovana - (Madison McLauglin) is the second daughter of Detective Alvin Olinsky from an affair. In "Born Into Bad News ", she calls Alvin from the juvenile center and reveals her status as his daughter. She appears in "Life Is Fluid", where her father gets her out of Juvie. She spends most of season three bonding with Alvin and starts to accept him as her father. Aside from brief appearance in "Forget My Name", she makes no further appearances and it is unknown what became of her but she is mentioned several times.
- Barbara "Bunny" Fletcher (Markie Post) is the biological mother of Detective Erin Lindsay. She is a former drug addict who was negligent of her daughter. Lindsay was eventually rescued by Detective Hank Voight, but not before dabbling in petty crime and being arrested five times. It was also mentioned by Hank he knew Bunny before Erin was born and a domestic call was always a common thing with her. In season 1, Bunny tries to reconnect with her daughter and ask for her forgiveness, but Lindsay does not trust her anymore following years of disappointment and false hope. Bunny had another child, Teddy Courtney, after her relationship/marriage with Lindsay's biological father ended. Like Erin, Teddy did not trust her as when he was put in foster care, he became the victims of a pedophile ring that was run through it. Bunny made amends with her son, and he moved in with her to get his life on track. In season 3, Lindsay mentions her dumping her fifth husband.
- Teddy Courtney (Lou Taylor Pucci) is the half-brother of Detective Erin Lindsay and son of Barbara "Bunny" Fletcher. While Lindsay was rescued by Voight, Teddy was placed in foster care and sexually abused due to a child sex trafficking ring. Upon getting older, he became a drug addict and prostitute. He first appeared in a picture as a young boy in Chicago Fire, depicted as a victim of a child sex trafficking ring, and was recognized by Voight and Lindsay. He physically appears in a crossover between Chicago P.D and Law & Order: Special Victims Unit, where he is reunited with Lindsay, who for years thought he went with his father, while Voight also regrets not taking him under his wing as well. Teddy helps the detectives take down the ring in New York before going back to Chicago. He is then reunited with his mother and moves in with her to get his life on track.

=== Police officers and CPD employees ===
- Commander Ronald "Ron" Perry (Robert Ray Wisdom) is the Commanding Officer of the 21st District until his retirement in 2014. He had "six hundred reasons why he did not want [Voight] to run Intelligence, but one reason why"—because he got results. He is killed by a group of rogue cops in "Born into Bad News".
- Sergeant Erica Gradishar (Robin Weigert) is Voight's handler from Internal Affairs. She is portrayed to be a pencil-pushing climber keen on using Voight and other uniformed officers to further her own career. She is furious upon finding out that Commander Perry chose Voight over Lieutenant Belden from Violent Crimes to be promoted to head the Intelligence Unit. After hitting a brick wall with Voight, she then tries to talk Antonio Dawson into "spying" on Voight, but her plan backfires because Dawson has a grudge against her. She had investigated Dawson's former partner Sean Patterson over a minor incident of the wrong paperwork being filed, but because of her, what should have been a minor infraction taken care of in-house turned into a full-blown investigation resulting in Patterson being fired and his pension withheld; Patterson committed suicide a year later. As a result, she leaves her position (whether she was fired, transferred, or forced to resign is not made clear), but not without warning Voight that IA would still be breathing down his neck even after her departure.
- Nadia Decotis (Stella Maeve) was an 18-year-old former escort Detective Erin Lindsay helps. The two of them form a friendship, and Lindsay becomes a surrogate older sister to her, likely because of Lindsay's own similar experience. Nadia begins working as an administrative assistant at CPD to gain experience as preparation to enter the police academy. Sergeant Platt also took her under her wing and would give her tips on how to pass her interviews and study for the written exam. In "The Number of Rats", Nadia was kidnapped from Chicago by a serial killer named Gregory Yates (Dallas Roberts) and found raped and murdered in New York in "Daydream Believer". She was posthumously honored alongside the fallen officers of the 21st District, including Detective Julia Willhite and Sheldon Jin.
- Sergeant Edwin Stillwell (Ian Bohen) is Voight's corrupt Internal Affairs handler after Gradishar leaves her position. It is revealed that he assigned Detective Mia Sumner to Intelligence to spy on Voight and that he blackmailed Sheldon Jin into spying on the Intelligence Unit, particularly Voight. He is arrested in 'Call It Macaroni' for the murder of Sheldon Jin.
- Detective Mia Sumner (Sydney Tamiia Poitier) is a detective assigned to the Intelligence Unit to replace Jules Willhite. She is reassigned to Narcotics in "The Docks" after Jin outs her contact with Voight's IA handler Stillwell in an attempt to cover up his own contact with him.
- Commander Fischer (Kevin J. O'Connor) is the new Commanding Officer of the 21st District who took over from Commander Perry after his retirement. His appearances are often met with tension from Voight and the rest of the unit. He is blunt and has no qualms about stepping on Voight's toes, compared to the firm but more diplomatic style of Perry.
- Greg "Mouse" Gerwitz (Samuel Hunt) is the Intelligence Unit's new tech analyst. After Jin is murdered, the team has no one handling the technical aspects, and duties are split between Atwater and Ruzek, both of whom detest working behind the desk or with anything technical. He served in the Rangers alongside Halstead and did two tours in Afghanistan, in the Korangal Valley. During his interview with Sergeant Platt, he mentioned that in Afghanistan, he and Halstead were in the lead Humvee of a convoy when they were bombed. In season 2, the character exhibits signs of PTSD, such as drifting off during a conversation, neglecting his personal appearance, the inability to look at anyone in the eye during a conversation and nervous twitches (restless fingers and stuttering). It is implied that he and Halstead supported one another during their difficult readjustment to civilian life. While Halstead eventually found his calling with the Chicago Police Department, Mouse bounced around from job to job before Halstead took him on as a confidential informant. Voight was initially hesitant to hire him due to his colorful past, which included sniffing nitrous oxide in college and hacking into a DOD comm satellite, and also partly because of Jin's betrayal. After proving his skills, Voight agrees to hire him, much to Atwater and Ruzek's relief. By season 3, he appears more confident and at ease around Voight and the unit. He leaves in the episode "A War Zone" to re-enlist in the U.S. Army.
- Deputy Chief/Commander Emma Crowley (Barbara Eve Harris) is one of the highest ranking female police officers and is a friend of Sergeant Platt. Based on her rank, it is presumed that she is likely the area deputy chief overseeing the area District 21 is located in.
- Officer Julie Tay (Li Jun Li) is Burgess' partner during the first five episodes of season 4. Before becoming Burgess' partner she worked at the 'worst patrol' due to her Commander trying to seduce her and her turning him down. She is sent back to this patrol in the fifth episode of season 4 when the commander in question found out about her new assignment.
- Officer Mike Sorensen (Kevin Kane) is introduced in 'Some Friend' as Burgess' partner after Julie was reassigned. In '300,000 Likes', he gets into hot water for posting a video from his body cam of a traffic stop on his Facebook account. In 'A Shot Heard Around the World', he resigns from the force to avoid being shot by a sniper who is targeting police officers.
- Chief Lugo (Esai Morales) is the commander of the Chicago Police Department's Organized Crime Bureau, the bureau that the Intelligence Unit is a part of.
- Detective Kenny Rixton (Nick Wechsler) was detailed to Intelligence from the Gang Unit as a temporary replacement for Ruzek, who had left for an unspecified undercover assignment. As his transfer was somewhat sudden and circumstances sketchy, the team regarded him with some suspicion. However they eventually find out that he left the Gang Unit as he had refused to take part in an IAD investigation into a payback beating he did not participate in but was privy of. He opted for a transfer rather than rat out his colleagues when IAD offered him a deal in exchange for information. He leaves after Ruzek returns to take up a position in Narcotics.
- Lieutenant Denny Woods (Mykelti Williamson) was a lieutenant in the Chicago Police Department, working as an independent auditor. He is introduced in "Grasping for Salvation" as a lieutenant in the Organized Crime Bureau, where he is questioned about his involvement in a murder case 17 years earlier that he and Voight work when new evidence pops up. He later attempts to coerce Voight to stay away from reinvestigating the murder, certain that they got the right man. It is revealed that Woods' CI was the person who actually committed the murder, and that Woods had told his CI to say that a man who Woods had targeted multiple times over the years had done it. He is stripped of his police powers by the Superintendent as a result, and all of his previous cases were investigated to check if they were by the book. He returns in "Reform", now as an independent auditor for the CPD. His first case is investigating Halstead following a shooting which led to the death of a little girl. It is revealed that Halstead shot a gang member first, and that the bullet went through the gang member, through a wood door, and then hit the little girl. Despite this, Woods continues to go after Halstead until Voight works out a side deal with Alderman Ray Price (Wendell Pierce). In "Fallen", he blackmails Adam Ruzek into getting incriminating evidence to take Voight down after Ruzek is caught deleting information on a DUI charge his sister received while his nephew was in the car. He receives a video of Halstead in a bar fight while undercover, but he does not bite and asks for more. He is arrested in "Homecoming" after he is caught bribing a witness into admitting that she saw Voight with his son's killer the night he died. It is revealed that Voight had set him up with the witness and turned the recording of him bribing her over to Internal Affairs.
- First Deputy Superintendent Katherine Brennan (Anne Heche) is a corrupt second-in-command of the Chicago Police Department and Brian Kelton's number two. She is introduced in "Bad Boys", where Voight goes to her to exonerate Olinsky after his death. She resigns in 'Confession', where it is revealed that Kelton blackmailed her into taking the fall for his wrongdoings. In "Reckoning", she gives Voight the name of a drug dealer associated with Kelton as Intelligence looks to take him down. In "Doubt", she reveals herself to be the murderer of Kelton and is given some time by Voight "to get her affairs in order". She attempts to commit suicide in her dress blues but is interrupted by and arrested by Halstead and Upton.
- Superintendent Brian Kelton (John C. McGinley) was the Superintendent of the Chicago Police Department and the mayor-elect of Chicago. It is revealed in 'The Forgotten', that when Kelton was a commander in 2016, he covered up a serial killer's murders in order to keep his stats intact. He sends a homicide detective in to jam up Intelligence in search of the serial killer, which leads to the death of Voight's CI. Voight gives Kelton's mayoral candidate Ray Price evidence that Kelton did cover up the murders. It is revealed later than if Kelton were to win the mayoral race, he would disband the Intelligence Unit. In "Reckoning", it is revealed he won the mayoral race by a landslide, due to his top opponent being arrested for murder. However, he is killed by Brennan in his house only hours after being elected the next Mayor of Chicago. Despite his murder, he is still given final salutes by the CPD as his body is taken away in a CFD ambulance to be autopsied and prepared for burial with full police honors.
- Acting/Interim Superintendent Jason Crawford (Paul Adelstein) is the incumbent Superintendent of the Chicago Police Department following the murder of Brian Kelton. He is introduced in "Assets", in which Voight makes an off-the-books deal to list Darius Walker as a confidential informant in exchange for the obstruction charges against Adam Ruzek being dismissed. He is shown to be a proponent of smart technology in "False Positive", giving Intelligence a beta version of facial recognition software in order to find the killer of two kids who were in the crossfire of a drug deal gone wrong. The software backfires when it identifies the wrong suspect and the suspect is killed in county jail, and Voight and Crawford are forced to cover it up by framing the wrong suspect and handing off the actual killer to the gang that got robbed. He returns in "The Devil You Know" when Voight comes to him about an Intelligence case where three highly decorated police officers are behind a number of illegal drug deals, only for the officers to be executed in an ambush set up by Darius Walker to prevent him being outed as a CI. Crawford and Voight proceed to cover up the crime scene to make it look like the officers died as heroes as opposed to corrupt cops.
- Deputy Superintendent Samantha Miller (Nicole Ari Parker) is the incumbent deputy superintendent of the Chicago Police Department, who is a major advocate for police reform. She is introduced in "Fighting Ghosts", where she warns Voight that if he continues to run the unit the way he normally does, he will be out of a job by Christmas. In the same episode, she chastises Voight when Ruzek announces himself after breaking down a suspect's door rather than before despite having a no-knock warrant and telling him that any evidence seized in the raid is no longer admissible, thus allowing Voight's suspect to avoid indictment. She and Voight continue to have difficulty seeing eye-to-eye from that point on. In the following episode, "White Knuckle", she pressures Voight to charge a murder suspect quickly to avoid accusations of preferential treatment, despite the fact that the suspect was high upon arrest and couldn't give a coherent statement. Later in Unforgiven, she refuses to defend or honor a slain officer due to the suspicious circumstances surrounding his murder. Despite this, she has also proven to be more reasonable than Voight's other superiors since she gives him 48 hours to find evidence before charging the suspect in "White Knuckle" and eventually honors the slain officer in "Unforgiven" once Voight convinces her that the officer was acting in protection of an assault victim.
- Probationary Police Officer Andre Cooper (Cleveland Berto) is an officer who was introduced as a rookie patrol officer whose field training officer shot and killed a black man in cold blood. He is first seen when Atwater and Ruzek go to arrest the officer and he is trying to get to his training officer's house to receive answers. He joined the Intelligence Unit in "Impossible Dream" at the behest of Deputy Superintendent Samantha Miller, who revealed that he was not respected by the department's black officers for standing around and not doing more as his partner shot the man and was being shunned by the white officers for not backing up his partner, and that Miller did not want to see Cooper, the valedictorian of his academy class, have his career ruined.

=== Criminals and informants ===
- Andres Diaz, aka Pulpo (English: "The Octopus") (Arturo del Puerto) is a drug lord and criminal, so nicknamed because he "had [his] hands everywhere". He has dual American and Colombian citizenship and was said to work for a cartel in Medellín. In the series pilot, "Stepping Stone", Pulpo is the main person of interest in Voight and the Intelligence Unit's investigations after they discover two dead drug dealers who were beheaded and had their heads displayed prominently nearby. He is nearly killed by Hank and Alvin after he almost killed Antonio in his escape from police custody. However he is sent back to prison after Jay persuaded Hank and Alvin to spare him.
- Maurice Owens (David Aron Damane) is the Mid-level Drug Dealer and one of Voight's informants. He is arrested by patrol officers who witnessed him dealing drugs, but Voight bails him out because of his value as an informant. Through Maurice's tip, Voight is able to get a lead on Pulpo in season 1. He also appeared on Chicago Fire in the episode "Let Her Go" and provided Voight with some information about a possible suspect involved in the fire that led to Dr. Hallie Thomas's death. As of season 3, according to Voight, he is in prison.
- Lonnie Rodiger (Matthew Sherbach) was a young pedophile who was suspected of murdering several boys, including Ben Corson, the younger brother of Detective Halstead's high school sweetheart, some years ago. Halstead would park his car outside the Rodiger home in plain view every year on Ben's death anniversary to make his point to Lonnie that he had not forgotten about Ben and the other murder victims, prompting Lonnie's father Phil to file a restraining order against Halstead and Voight to give Halstead a stern warning to back off before things get out of control. Lonnie was found dead in the episode "At Least It's Justice". Halstead was the prime suspect but was exonerated when Phil confessed to killing his son in a fit of rage upon discovering incriminating photos on Lonnie's computer.
- Gregory Yates (né Williams) (Dallas Roberts) was a sociopathic serial killer who targeted women. He was said to responsible for several unsolved murders in New York. A notable aspect of his crimes was his usage of sadistic torture methods with the intention of letting his victims die slow and painful deaths. His last victim prior to his arrest by the Chicago PD Intelligence Unit was Nadia Decotis. In season 3 he escapes police custody and goes on a rampage while on his mission for revenge. He develops an obsession with Erin as they had families who abandoned them. Erin later corners Yates in his childhood home and after he has killed another man, she shoots him dead.
- Darius Walker (Michael Beach) was a drug kingpin who Intelligence targeted to get in "Assets". He's arrested when he's caught while in the process of completing a drug deal with his supplier. Due to his presence in the community and his ability to keep his subordinates disciplined, Voight goes to Superintendent Crawford to approve a deal where they keep Walker on the streets as a cooperating defendant to Intelligence while also getting the obstruction charges against Ruzek dropped. In "Informant", Voight goes to Walker to help Intelligence find who supplied their victim with fentanyl that led to his overdose. When one of Upton's CIs accidentally spots Walker inside the 21st District, he is shot and killed, resulting in Upton being drenched with his blood while it is implied that Walker orchestrated the murder of her CI in order to prevent word going out he was a CI. He is killed in "The Devil You Know" when Upton outs him as a snitch to avenge the death of her CI and the deaths of three police officers who were stealing drugs from the evidence lockup.

=== Other ===
- Steve Kot (Chris Agos) is an Assistant State's Attorney who often prosecutes perpetrators arrested by the Intelligence Unit and sometimes gives them advice on legal matters regarding their cases. In season 2 he crosses paths with Intelligence and was the prosecutor of notorious Polish mobster Oscar Bembenek, getting a successful conviction. His sixteen-year-old daughter Dora was shot execution-style in broad daylight as part of Bembenek's plot to seek revenge on those he held responsible for his imprisonment. The character has also crossed over to Chicago Fire.
- Ray Price (Wendell Pierce) is an alderman who collaborated with Voight on occasion. He is introduced in "Reform", where he proceeds to go after Halstead after the accidental shooting of a little girl. He and Voight come to terms on a deal later, where Price will lay off of Halstead while Voight will release a gang member who was thought to be a lookout who is actually revealed to be the mastermind of the gang. He returns in "Fallen", where he and Voight conspire to keep quiet about how the murder of CPD Vice Sergeant Sean McGrady by drug dealer and suspected murderer Quinton Kane is actually a suicide to free McGrady of his mounting debt. In "Politics", he asks Voight to get him crime scene photos of a congressman who was a person of interest in the murder of a prostitute who was later cleared. Voight initially refuses, citing the congressman's support of the CPD and his stellar reputation, but Price responds by threatening to reveal the true cause of Sgt. McGrady's death. Voight then proceeds to give him the photos. He returns in "Night in Chicago", talking to Kevin Atwater about the night an unarmed African-American was shot by Chicago police officers during a traffic stop. He enters the Chicago mayoral race in "Good Men", and is the top opponent against Brian Kelton. He tries to convince Voight to get into politics, and Voight is initially hesitant. Following the death of Voight's CI, caused by the coverup of Superintendent Kelton, Voight gives Price evidence that incriminates Kelton in the cover-up of the murders of a serial killer. In "Pain Killer", Price is shot by a sniper and thought to be an assassination attempt initially. It is later revealed that Voight was the intended target of the sniper. In "This City", he and Voight work as peacemakers to attempt to end a gang war that has killed innocent people. In "What Could Have Been", Price is at the top of the polls in the mayoral race, but is arrested for the murder of Kelton's top political consultant and Kim Burgess' boyfriend, taking the fall for his wife, who killed him to cover-up the drug overdose of a college student caused by the drugs that were given to her by Price's daughter.
- Blair Williams (Charles Michael Davis) was a political consultant who worked on Brian Kelton's mayoral campaign. Originally from Connecticut, he was arrested when he was 17 for possession of drugs that belonged to his father. He attended Princeton University, majoring in political science. He had a fling with Kim Burgess during his time in Chicago, and was planning on moving to Chicago to be with her. He is killed in "What Could Have Been" by Alicia Price in an attempt to cover-up the death of a woman who overdosed on drugs given to her by Price's daughter, Jasmine. Alicia's husband, Ray takes the fall for her in exchange for a favorable deal.

=== Minor characters ===
- FBI Agent Troy Kivisto (Himself) - Enters the sphere in season 5, portraying the cooperation the FBI Chicago Division has gained working with the Chicago Police Department. He brings to the set his vast "real-life" military and law enforcement background, including his years working undercover in a task force, as a supervisor, as well as participating in numerous Organized Crime Drug Enforcement Task Force (OCDETF) cases with the Federal Bureau of Investigation (FBI), the Drug Enforcement Administration (DEA) and the Illinois State Police (ISP).
- Detective Julia "Jules" Willhite (Melissa Sagemiller) was the partner of Antonio Dawson. She appeared in both Chicago Fire (1 episode) and Chicago P.D.. The character is killed in the premiere of Chicago P.D. and is the catalyst for Detective Voight's feud with Lieutenant Belden. She was declared DOA after Belden's decision to withhold information backfires and she and Dawson walk into a trap as a result. Her husband Dr. Alec Willhite (Erik Hellman) has also appeared in several episodes of both Fire and P.D.. The couple have two children.
- Lieutenant Bruce Belden (Kurt Naebig) was from the Violent Crimes Unit and Voight's nemesis. In the show's premiere, he withholds information from Voight's team, leading Detectives Willhite and Dawson to walk into a trap, and Willhite is killed as a result. Voight blames Belden for her death. Belden frequently butts heads with Voight over the Pulpo case. It is revealed that Pulpo had played on Belden's over-zealousness to play "by the book" and contradict Voight at any given chance. He is murdered during Pulpo's escape from police custody.
- Charlie Pugliese (Billy Wirth) is a former associate of Erin Lindsay who becomes a person of interest during an investigation. Voight rescues her from Charlie, and she has thus far refused to disclose what really happened, even telling Halstead that he would not want to know the full story. Based on the brief but tense conversations between her and Charlie, it is presumed that he may have taken her in when she was living on the streets and forced her to commit crimes in exchange for food and shelter.

== Crossover characters ==
=== Chicago Fire ===
- Matthew Casey (Jesse Spencer) is a lieutenant in the Chicago Fire Department on Truck Company 81 at Firehouse 51.
- Kelly Severide (Taylor Kinney) is a Chicago Fire Department lieutenant as the head of Rescue Squad 3 based out of Firehouse 51. He is the focus of "Don't Bury This Case" where he is the prime suspect in a hit and run involving his car that ended in a child being killed. Severide is unable to remember what happened since he was blackout drunk, and it causes tensions between the Intelligence Unit and Firehouse 51.
- Gabriela "Gabby" Dawson (Monica Raymund) is the younger sister of Antonio Dawson. She is a paramedic on Ambulance 61, and was previously a firefighter with Truck 81 based out of Firehouse 51, several blocks away from her brother's district. During her pregnancy (with Lieutenant Casey's child), she was temporarily assigned to arson. She, Herrmann and Otis jointly own and run Molly's, a small bar frequented by the characters from all four shows of the Chicago franchise.
- Christopher Herrmann (David Eigenberg) is a firefighter and co-owner of Molly's. He largely appears in scenes at Molly's, where he serves drinks and chats with patrons.
- Brian "Otis" Zvonecek (Yuri Sardarov) is a firefigther and co-owner of Molly's. Like Dawson and Herrmann, his appearances are mainly confined to scenes at Molly's, when he chats with patrons while serving drinks. In the episode "The Docks" he helped Intelligence translate some Russian as the team was investigating some Russian mobsters who spoke no English.
- Joe Cruz (Joe Minoso) is a firefighter at 51. Originally the driver of Truck 81, he receives his squad certification at the end of season 3 and joins Squad 3 during the midst of a feud between Truck 81 and Squad 3.
- Randy "Mouch" McHolland (Christian Stolte) is a firefighter usually found occupying the firehouse couch. In season 4 he becomes engaged and marries Sergeant Platt. In "What Puts You on That Ledge", he helps Roman and Burgess with a case of an uncooperative squatter who refuses to return the apartment to its owners.
- Peter Mills (Charlie Barnett) is a former firefighter and paramedic at 51. He was the responding paramedic to several of the Intelligence Unit's calls involving injured victims.
- Sylvie Brett (Kara Killmer) is a paramedic for Ambulance 61, stationed at Firehouse 51. She has occasionally crossed paths with Intelligence on the job, has dated Antonio on and off, and is friends with Lindsay and Burgess. She and Gabby sometimes hang out with them.
- Emily Foster (Annie Ilonzeh) is a paramedic at Firehouse 51 and Gabriela Dawson's successor on Ambulance 61.

=== Chicago Med ===
- Dr. Will Halstead (Nick Gehlfuss) is the brother of Jay Halstead and an attending at the Gaffney Chicago Medical Center. He was first introduced in the episode "Say Her Real Name" when he returns home to Chicago and was trying to stop a bar fight when the officer called to the incident recognized his last name and called Platt to alert Jay. He initially moves back from New York City after being "kicked out" of a practice by his partners and then gets a job at Chicago Med, only to tell Jay that he would be returning to New York City after his first day. In the Chicago P.D. episode "Get Back to Even", Will tells his brother that he decided to stay as Chicago Med needed ER doctors. The brothers share a close relationship and their paths have crossed several times in Jay's investigations.
- Dr. Daniel Charles (Oliver Platt) is a psychiatrist at Chicago Medical Center. Erin Lindsay is forced by Voight to seek counseling from Dr. Charles as part of the conditions for regaining her badge. Although she makes no secret of her dislike of shrinks, she appreciates Dr. Charles' compassion and genuine desire to help her. Dr. Charles has also aided the team in cases involving psychologically unstable criminals.
- Dr. Natalie Manning (Torrey DeVitto) is an ER pediatrician at Chicago Medical Center. She occasionally assists Voight and the Intelligence Unit on investigating their cases.
