= February 2020 Chicago crossover event =

Television crossover event

- Chicago crossover event
- Promotional image for the event featuring Brian Geraghty as Sean Roman
- Original air date: February 26, 2020

Part 1: Chicago Fire
- Episode title: "Off the Grid"
- Episode no.: Season 8 Episode 15
- Directed by: Reza Tabrizi
- Written by: Matt Whitney

Episode chronology
← Previous "Shut It Down"	Next → "The Tendency of a Drowning Victim"
- Chicago Fire season 8

Part 2: Chicago P.D.
- Episode title: "Burden of Truth"
- Episode no.: Season 7 Episode 15
- Directed by: Eriq La Salle
- Written by: Rick Eid & Gwen Sigan

Episode chronology
← Previous "Center Mass"	Next → "Intimate Violence"
- Chicago P.D. season 7

Crossover chronology
- Preceded by: Infection
- Followed by: In the Trenches

The February 2020 Chicago crossover event is a two-part fictional crossover that exists within the Chicago television franchise. The event aired on NBC consecutively in two back-to-back one-hour timeslots on February 26, 2020. It began with "Off the Grid" of Chicago Fire and concluded with "Burden of Truth" of Chicago P.D. Both episodes followed a unified storyline of a former Chicago police officer returning to Chicago to search for his missing sister. Many actors in the franchise appeared outside of their main series guest starring in the other part of the crossover. The crossover event most notably featured the publicized return of former Chicago P.D. series regular Brian Geraghty who portrays Sean Roman and last appeared in the franchise in 2016.

== Plot ==
=== Part 1: "Off the Grid" ===
Ambulance 61 is dispatched to a call, when they arrive, they find multiple people down of suspected opioid overdoses. Squad 3 responds to assist when one of the victims is trapped. One of the victim's boyfriend, Travis Butler, shows up but runs when questions start being asked. The Intelligence Unit starts investigating where the drugs came from and it is found all the victims have suffered from counterfeit Oxy. Casey offers to take Brett to meet her birth mom if she wants a friend to go along. Intelligence tracks down the boyfriend who agrees to help the police. Former Chicago P.D. officer Sean Roman shows up at Firehouse 51 looking for his sister Sarah, who was friends with the original victims, and went missing a week prior. Boden, Severide, Casey, Brett, Foster, along with Roman begin putting the pieces together. Boden tells his wife Donna, who is a teacher at the victims' school, about the deaths who takes it hard. Brett takes Casey up on the offer and they go to meet her birth mother. Donna gets Severide and Roman a meeting with Sarah's best friend who points them to Sarah's boyfriend, Logan Peters. When Brett goes to the door of the address she was given, she is told no one by that name lives there. Roman and Severide visit one of Roman's old connections from his days on the street. The two get held at gunpoint but take control of the situation and are pointed to where Peters spends time. After things begin to get dangerous Severide asks Roman to go to the police, when he refuses Severide refuses to continue with him and goes to Intelligence on his own who are all shocked by the news, he's in Chicago. The next morning Brett's birth mother shows up at Firehouse 51, the two begin talking and her mother reveals that she is pregnant. Their meeting is cut short when the firehouse is dispatched to a house fire. Upon arrival shots are fired toward the first responders and Roman comes running out of the house. Roman informs them that Peters is inside the house and was firing at him. Casey and Severide go inside to search the house and find Butler suffering from a gunshot wound. Intelligence shows up at the scene of the house fire.

=== Part 2: "Burden of Truth" ===
Neighbors identify Butler heading inside the house with a can of gasoline and is assumed to have started the fire. Roman reveals to Burgess that his sister has been dealing for Peters. Halstead and Upton head to the hospital to interview Butler where a fight breaks out between Butler's father and victims' parents of the fire. Butler tells Intelligence that Peters is responsible for Sarah going missing. Burgess and Roman interview Peters' ex-roommates who identifies Sarah and points them to a lake house. At the lake house they find Sarah frozen to death under snow in the back yard. Roman visits his parents and he inform them that they found Sarah's body. DNA found under Sarah's fingernails matched to Peters. Running location history Intelligence tracked suspects history to a warehouse where Peters is found dead. Ruzek and Burgess talk through their feelings after losing the baby. A witness near the warehouse at the time of Peters murder identifies a black Range Rover driving away from the scene that points Intelligence towards a house where they find another suspect. Camera feeds reveal a blue Nissan driving away from the warehouse at the same time. Burgess re-questions the witness who identified the Range Rover but he doesn't recall seeing a blue Nissan. Platt finds out that the witness used to also be a former confidential informant of Roman's. Burgess also finds that Roman's cousin drives a blue Nissan. With signs of Peters murder pointing towards Roman, Burgess confronts him, but he continues to say he had no involvement. Voight orders Intelligence to bring in the witness but he's cleared out his apartment. His landlady however tells Intelligence that he paid off his debt of three grand, Voight suggests pulling cameras from the bank to see who paid off the witness. Members of District 21 and Firehouse 51 attend Sarah's funeral. Following the funeral service Roman prepares to be taken in for murder but Voight looks the other way and lets him off the hook.

== Cast and characters ==
=== Main ===
Actor	Character	Episode	
Actor	Character	Chicago Fire	Chicago P.D.
Jesse Spencer	Matthew Casey	Main	
Taylor Kinney	Kelly Severide	Main	Guest
Kara Killmer	Sylvie Brett	Main	Guest
David Eigenberg	Christopher Hermann	Main	
Joe Minoso	Joe Cruz	Main	
Christian Stolte	Randy "Mouch" McHolland	Main	Guest
Miranda Rae Mayo	Stella Kidd	Main	
Annie Ilonzeh	Emily Foster	Main	Guest
Alberto Rosende	Blake Gallo	Main	
Eamonn Walker	Wallace Boden	Main	Guest
Jason Beghe	Henry "Hank" Voight	Guest	Main
Jesse Lee Soffer	Jay Halstead		Main
Tracy Spiridakos	Hailey Upton		Main
Marina Squerciati	Kim Burgess	Guest	Main
Patrick John Flueger	Adam Ruzek	Guest	Main
LaRoyce Hawkins	Kevin Atwater	Guest	Main
Lisseth Chavez	Vanessa Rojas		Main
Amy Morton	Trudy Platt		Main

=== Notable guests ===
Actor	Character	Episode	
Actor	Character	Chicago Fire	Chicago P.D.
Brian Geraghty	Sean Roman	Guest	Guest
Melissa Ponzio	Donna Robbins-Boden	Guest	
Daniel Kyri	Darren Ritter	Guest	
Kelly Deadmon	Julie	Guest	
Randy Flagler	Harold Capp	Guest	
Anthony Ferraris	Tony Ferraris	Guest	Guest
Phillip Cusic	Travis Butler	Guest	Guest
Sean Ramey	O'Malley		Guest
Larnell Shadd	Christian Lewis		Guest
John Carter Brown	Roman's father		Guest
Christine Dye	Roman's Mother		Guest

== Production ==
On January 6, 2020, it was announced that Chicago Fire and Chicago P.D. would be crossing over for the second Chicago franchise crossover in the 2019-20 television season; with the air date for the crossover set for February 26. The next day it was revealed that former P.D. series regular Brian Geraghty would return to the franchise as a guest star for the event. Pre-production for the episode began as early as June 2019. The Chicago Fire episode began filming the week of January 5, 2020, followed by filming on the Chicago P.D. episode beginning the week of January 12, 2020. The air date for the crossover event was later announced to be February 29, 2020. Chicago Med was not included in the crossover despite also airing a new episode the same week. This is the sixth year since 2014, with the exception of 2016, for the annual crossover event between Chicago Fire and Chicago P.D. that airs in the second half of the television season; Chicago Fire showrunner Derek Haas stated "We do two crossovers a year, typically a gigantic one in the fall and then a Fire/P.D. one in the spring." Haas also stated in a later interview that bringing Geraghty back had been the original idea for the "Infection" crossover but that Geraghty was unavailable at the time because he was filming USA Network drama Briarpatch.

== Reception ==
=== Critical response ===
Jessica Lerner with TV Fanatic who reviewed the first part of the crossover stated that "the episode gets an 'A' for effort, but a 'B−' at best in execution" noting that Chicago Fire usually follows a serialized format while Chicago P.D. follows a procedural format making the two series incompatible. Lerner later mentions that she enjoyed the unusual pairings between characters Kelly Severide and Sean Roman because of their similarities and said that overall this crossover event was disappointing compared to the previous one. Lizzy Buczak also with TV Fanatic reviewed the second portion of the crossover also found the event compared to the previous one but said "it found a way to bring these two squads back together again."

=== Viewing figures ===
Chicago Fire, the first part of the crossover event, was viewed by 8.66 million viewers. Meanwhile, during the second part of the crossover Chicago P.D. brought in 8.12 million viewers.
