= Chicago P.D. season 7 =

Season of television series

Chicago P.D.
- Season 7
- Chicago P.D. Season 7 DVD cover
- Showrunner: Rick Eid
- No. of episodes: 20

Release
- Original network: NBC
- Original release: September 25, 2019 – April 15, 2020

Season chronology
- ← Previous; Season 6 Next → Season 8

The seventh season of Chicago P.D., an American police drama television series with executive producer Dick Wolf, and producers Derek Haas, Michael Brandt, and Rick Eid, was ordered on February 26, 2019. The season premiered on September 25, 2019. On March 13, 2020, the production of the seventh season was suspended due to the COVID-19 pandemic.

== Cast ==
=== Regular cast members ===
- Jason Beghe as Sergeant Henry "Hank" Voight
- Jesse Lee Soffer as Detective Jay Halstead
- Tracy Spiridakos as Detective Hailey Upton
- Marina Squerciati as Officer Kim Burgess
- Patrick John Flueger as Officer Adam Ruzek
- LaRoyce Hawkins as Officer Kevin Atwater
- Lisseth Chavez as Officer Vanessa Rojas (Episode 4 onwards, Guest Episodes 2–3)
- Amy Morton as Desk Sergeant Trudy Platt

=== Recurring characters ===
- Paul Adelstein as Interim Superintendent Jason Crawford
- Michael Beach as Darius Walker

=== Special guest stars ===
- Anne Heche as Deputy Superintendent Katherine Brennan
- Brian Geraghty as Sean Roman

=== Special co-stars ===
- Ricky Bartlett as Security Guard 1

=== Crossover characters ===
- Eamonn Walker as Battalion Chief Wallace Boden
- Jesse Spencer as Captain Matt Casey
- Taylor Kinney as Lieutenant Kelly Severide
- David Eigenberg as Lieutenant Christopher Hermann
- Joe Minoso as Firefighter Joe Cruz
- Christian Stolte as Firefighter Randy "Mouch" McHolland
- Miranda Rae Mayo as Firefighter Stella Kidd
- Alberto Rosende as Firefighter Blake Gallo
- Randy Flagler as Firefighter Harold Capp
- Anthony Ferraris as Firefighter Tony
- Daniel Kyri as Firefighter Darren Ritter
- Kara Killmer as Paramedic-in-charge Sylvie Brett
- Annie Ilonzeh as Paramedic Emily Foster
- Nick Gehlfuss as Dr. Will Halstead
- Yaya DaCosta as April Sexton
- Torrey DeVitto as Dr. Natalie Manning
- Dominic Rains as Dr. Crockett Marcel
- S. Epatha Merkerson as Sharon Goodwin
- Jeremy Shouldis as Doctor Marty Peterson
- Eileen Galindo as Mama Garcia

== Episodes ==
No. overall	No. in season	Title	Directed by	Written by	Original release date	Prod. code	U.S. viewers (millions)
129	1	"Doubt"	Eriq La Salle	Rick Eid & Gavin Harris	September 25, 2019	701	6.49
Following Kelton's murder, Voight is the prime suspect. The Intelligence unit digs deeper into the investigation concerning Kelton's death, only for Voight to order the team to stand as he wants to handle with himself while Halstead discovers who the true suspect is while as Ruzek posts bail from prison, Dawson goes missing with Voight learning Dawson has gone into a rehab facility.
130	2	"Assets"	Carl Seaton	Rick Eid & Gavin Harris	October 2, 2019	702	5.90
Halstead joins Atwater in an undercover operation to try to take down a South Side drug ring but things get complicated when it's revealed that other Police precincts are undercover in the same operation while Voight tries to get leniency from the prosecutor in hopes of sparing Ruzek from prison.
131	3	"Familia"	Eriq La Salle	Timothy J. Sexton	October 9, 2019	703	6.34
The Intelligence unit deals with a botched carjacking that ends with one suspect fleeing the scene and another man dead with the team uncovering evidence suggesting a local drug kingpin is operating in the city while as Vanessa Rojas, the team's newest struggles to adjust from her previous experience as an undercover to an officer in Intelligence while the team struggle to adapt to Dawson leaving, Voight revealing Dawson resigned from Chicago PD and the team, choosing to move to Puerto Rico, where he has family.
132	4	"Infection: Part III"	Eriq La Salle	Teleplay by : Gwen Sigan; Story by : Dick Wolf & Derek Haas	October 16, 2019	704	8.62
The Intelligence unit races against the clock as more people get infected by the deadly flesh-eating bacteria sending the city of Chicago in a panic. Meanwhile, after being cleared of the bacteria, Upton and Dr. Natalie Manning tend to a young victim that Upton befriended. Later on, Voight discovers that the suspect's next target is the Chicago parade. During the chaos, Dr. Will Halstead and the CDC finally come up with the antibiotics to fix the problem. The conclusion of a three-part episode that begins on Chicago Fire and continues on Chicago Med.
133	5	"Brother's Keeper"	Vince Misiano	Joe Halpin	October 23, 2019	705	6.64
The team investigates the murder of a Bulgarian citizen. The investigation soon complicates when witnesses won't talk to the police. Meanwhile, Ruzek begins to suspect that one of the patrolmen is abusing his power on a new recruit, resulting in a beef between Intelligence and Patrol.
134	6	"False Positive"	David Rodriguez	Scott Gold	October 30, 2019	706	6.29
The team investigates a drug deal gone wrong when two small children are shot and killed in the crossfire. When the team comes up short on finding a suspect, a police Superintendent recommends the intelligence unit to use a new smart technology database to find a possible suspect. When they do, he is brutally beaten to death while in custody. Halstead soon discovers the suspect is innocent and it is revealed that the database only brings up people of color as prime suspects, leading him to believe that it's being used as a form of racial profiling.
135	7	"Informant"	Vince Misiano	Gwen Sigan	November 6, 2019	707	6.44
Voight and the team investigate the death of a young man who was killed on a fentanyl overdose. Upton pulls in one of her CI's to help with the case. Later on, Upton's CI is murdered and it is suspected that the killer might be one of Voight's CIs.
136	8	"No Regrets"	Mykelti Williamson	Kim Rome	November 13, 2019	708	6.47
The Intelligence unit investigates a missing persons case, Voight is forced to choose between going by the books or doing things his own way. Meanwhile, after being mildly injured on the job, Burgess discovers that she is pregnant by Ruzek and wonders if she should keep the baby or not.
137	9	"Absolution"	Paul McCrane	Gavin Harris	November 20, 2019	709	6.88
The Intelligence unit races against the clock to find Halstead, who has been kidnapped by thugs along with a woman who a link to a mistake by Halstead which resulted in a death. Meanwhile, Burgess considers options with her pregnancy.
138	10	"Mercy"	Olivia Newman	Timothy J. Sexton	January 8, 2020	710	7.02
The Intelligence unit rushes Halstead to the Hospital after being shot. Fearing the worst, Upton reconsiders her feelings for Halstead. Meanwhile, Voight and the rest of the unit work a case involving gang members selling Army official semi-automatic weapons. Atwater discovers that his brother is back in Chicago and might be tied into the case. Also, Burgess makes a decision regarding her pregnancy.
139	11	"43rd and Normal"	Chad Saxton	Rick Eid & Gwen Sigan	January 15, 2020	711	6.78
The unit investigates a series of vandalism that turns deadly. Meanwhile, Ruzek begins to take dramatic steps into his relationship with Burgess during her pregnancy much to the latter's dismay. Also, Atwater reaches out to his estranged brother.
140	12	"The Devil You Know"	Eriq La Salle	Scott Gold	January 22, 2020	712	6.91
The Intelligence unit makes a deal with Walker as they investigate a series of illegal drug deals by dirty cops. Upon learning about the deal, Upton begins to take matters of the investigation into her own hands. Also, Burgess tries to put in all the field work she can before she is forced to do desk work due to her pregnancy.
141	13	"I Was Here"	Charles S. Carroll	Gwen Sigan	February 5, 2020	713	7.14
After receiving a 911 call about a possible domestic dispute, Burgess follows up with the location of the call with Platt and they find a murder victim. Later on, the Intelligence unit discovers that the killer is wanted by the FBI in six states for creating a sex trafficking ring. Burgess is injured while saving the victim who made the 911 call to her, and she loses the baby.
142	14	"Center Mass"	Lisa Demaine	Gavin Harris	February 12, 2020	714	7.00
A favor from Rojas's former case worker to find a homeless man leads to Intelligence investigating the homeless man's murder. The investigation leads to them pursuing a cop killer who killed the homeless man for his identity. Over the course of the investigation, Rojas has several interactions with a witness who has paranoid schizophrenia, the last of which ends up being a troubling experience for her. Meanwhile, Burgess decides to return to work after taking some time to recuperate.
143	15	"Burden of Truth"	Eriq La Salle	Rick Eid & Gwen Sigan	February 26, 2020	715	8.12
The Intelligence unit continues to investigate a series of fatal overdoses of counterfeit oxy on young teenagers including former Chicago patrol officer Sean Roman's (special guest star Brian Geraghty) sister Sarah. The case later turns to homicide when the drug dealer turns up dead and Roman becomes a suspect. Meanwhile, Ruzek tries to get Burgess to open up following the loss of their baby. The conclusion of a two-part crossover that began on Chicago Fire.
144	16	"Intimate Violence"	Mykelti Williamson	Teleplay by : Timothy J. Sexton; Story by : Timothy J. Sexton & Ike Smith	March 4, 2020	716	7.07
Upton and Halstead respond to an active armed robbery at a local check cashing business. The case quickly turns to homicide after a victim dies at the hospital. Halstead learns that one of the witnesses (Haley Webb) was involved in the robbery and that her husband is one of the robbers and has a history of domestic violence.
145	17	"Before the Fall"	Nicole Rubio	Scott Gold & Jake Tinker	March 18, 2020	717	7.50
Voight enlists the help of a reformed gang member to get a key witness' testimony in a murder case. More lives are put on the line as a gang war brews.
146	18	"Lines"	Alex Chapple	Kim Rome & Gwen Sigan	March 25, 2020	718	7.75
Intelligence does everything they can to build a case against the elusive leader of a drug ring, but things get complicated when Rojas realizes someone she cares about might be involved. Hailey takes things too far to protect Rojas and ultimately pays a price for her actions. After the case has been solved, Hailey arrives in Voight's office and learns the FBI field office in New York is looking for a loan-out officer to join their division for a few weeks with Voight revealing he signed her up for it. This episode sets up the FBI episode "Emotional Rescue".
147	19	"Buried Secrets"	Paul McCrane	Teleplay by : Timothy J. Sexton; Story by : Timothy J. Sexton & Gwen Sigan	April 8, 2020	719	7.75
After a night drinking at a bar, Ruzek witnesses a woman being kidnapped and tries to go after her, but crashes the vehicle he has commandeered. The Intelligence unit races against the clock to find the missing woman. Voight later discovers that the victim's father might have something to do with the kidnapping. Meanwhile, Burgess considers reconciling with Ruzek.
148	20	"Silence of the Night"	Eriq La Salle	Rick Eid & Gavin Harris	April 15, 2020	720	7.82
While undercover to apprehend two illicit weapons dealers, Atwater runs into Doyle, the same officer who racially profiled him during a traffic stop. Atwater discovers that Doyle has been promoted to detective and they are forced to work together. After taking down the dealers, Doyle and Atwater temporarily make amends and Doyle asks Atwater to get a drink. On the way, Doyle profiles a black man with a duffel bag and goes in pursuit, with Atwater going in after. Doyle is shot and killed after murdering Shawn Paige (the black man he was profiling). Doyle's precinct wants to keep quiet about the details to prevent it from being known that Doyle actually committed murder, as it would destroy his legacy and to prevent Doyle's alleged murderers from being acquitted of both the alleged murder and for allegedly distributing drugs that were seized by the Chicago PD without a warrant or probable cause as a result of Doyle's racism. All of this prompts Atwater to do the right thing and speak up.

== Production ==
Actor Jon Seda, who plays Antonio Dawson, departed the series at the end of the sixth season due to creative reasons. In July 2019, Lisseth Chavez joined the cast in the recurring role of Vanessa Rojas, an undercover officer.

== Ratings ==
Viewership and ratings per episode of Chicago P.D. season 7
No.	Title	Air date	Rating/share (18–49)	Viewers (millions)	DVR (18–49)	DVR viewers (millions)	Total (18–49)	Total viewers (millions)
1	"Doubt"	September 25, 2019	1.1/6	6.49	1.0	4.66	2.1	11.15
2	"Assets"	October 2, 2019	1.0/5	5.90	0.9	3.88	1.9	9.79
3	"Familia"	October 9, 2019	1.0/5	6.34	0.9	3.93	1.9	10.27
4	"Infection: Part III"	October 16, 2019	1.4/7	8.62	0.9	4.37	2.2	13.00
5	"Brother's Keeper"	October 23, 2019	1.1/6	6.64	0.8	3.82	1.9	10.47
6	"False Positive"	October 30, 2019	1.1/5	6.29	0.8	3.95	1.9	10.25
7	"Informant"	November 6, 2019	1.0/5	6.44	0.9	4.05	1.8	10.50
8	"No Regrets"	November 13, 2019	1.0/5	6.47	0.9	4.16	1.9	10.64
9	"Absolution"	November 20, 2019	1.1/6	6.88	0.8	3.84	1.9	10.72
10	"Mercy"	January 8, 2020	1.0/6	7.02	0.9	4.50	2.0	11.53
11	"43rd and Normal"	January 15, 2020	1.1/6	6.78	1.0	4.50	2.1	11.29
12	"The Devil You Know"	January 22, 2020	1.0/5	6.91	1.0	4.49	2.0	11.41
13	"I Was Here"	February 5, 2020	1.1	7.14	0.9	4.14	2.0	11.29
14	"Center Mass"	February 12, 2020	1.0	7.00	0.9	4.17	1.9	11.17
15	"Burden of Truth"	February 26, 2020	1.2	8.12	1.0	4.47	2.2	12.59
16	"Intimate Violence"	March 4, 2020	1.0	7.07	0.9	3.98	1.9	11.06
17	"Before the Fall"	March 18, 2020	1.2	7.50	1.0	4.46	2.2	11.97
18	"Lines"	March 25, 2020	1.2	7.75	0.9	4.06	2.1	11.82
19	"Buried Secrets"	April 8, 2020	1.1	7.75	1.0	4.16	2.1	11.83
20	"Silence of the Night"	April 15, 2020	1.1	7.82	0.9	3.98	2.0	11.80
