= Chicago P.D. season 8 =

Season of television series

Chicago P.D.
- Season 8
- Chicago P.D. Season 8 DVD cover
- Showrunner: Rick Eid
- No. of episodes: 16

Release
- Original network: NBC
- Original release: November 11, 2020 – May 26, 2021

Season chronology
- ← Previous; Season 7 Next → Season 9

The eighth season of Chicago P.D., an American police drama television series with executive producer Dick Wolf, and producers Derek Haas, Michael Brandt, and Rick Eid. The season premiered on November 11, 2020.

== Cast ==
=== Regular cast members ===
- Jason Beghe as Sergeant Henry "Hank" Voight
- Jesse Lee Soffer as Detective Jay Halstead
- Tracy Spiridakos as Detective Hailey Upton
- Marina Squerciati as Officer Kim Burgess
- Patrick John Flueger as Officer Adam Ruzek
- LaRoyce Hawkins as Officer Kevin Atwater
- Amy Morton as Desk Sergeant Trudy Platt

=== Recurring characters ===
- Nicole Ari Parker as Deputy Superintendent Samantha Miller
- Cleveland Berto as Officer Andre Cooper
- Elena Marisa Flores as Officer Rosado
- Jack Coleman as Disco Bob Ruzek
- Ramona Edith Williams as Makayla Ward

=== Guest starring ===
- Jocelyn Zamudio as Elena Sanchez

== Episodes ==
No. overall	No. in season	Title	Directed by	Written by	Original release date	Prod. code	U.S. viewers (millions)
149	1	"Fighting Ghosts"	Eriq La Salle	Teleplay by : Rick Eid; Story by : Rick Eid & Gavin Harris	November 11, 2020	801	6.43
Voight and the rest of the Intelligence unit grapple with the revolution of police reform and COVID-19. Meanwhile, the Intelligence unit investigates a shooting that involves a five-year-old child. While dealing with police brutality, Atwater suggests not to engage in physical altercations with the suspect, to Voight's dismay. Also, Voight is introduced to the new Deputy Superintendent, Samantha Miller (guest star Nicole Ari Parker). Later, Atwater gets into a blowup with Voight over the way the police confront suspects, and Voight tells Atwater to find another job if he wants to argue about how the Intelligence Unit runs. Later, Atwater is attacked by several unknown people and is left struggling to get back up.
150	2	"White Knuckle"	Nicole Rubio	Gwen Sigan	November 18, 2020	802	6.38
After a local and highly respected alderman's son is suspected of murder, Miller tries to pressure Voight into charging the teen quickly and quietly without him being suspected of racial favoring. Meanwhile, Atwater and Voight continue to have disagreements on how to handle the racial insensitivity Atwater is experiencing within the police department. Sgt. Nolan's ongoing harassment against Atwater continues to escalate, and things come to a head when Ruzek is wounded due to patrol officers not responding to Atwater's unit's requests for backup. Faced with losing his badge or accepting a deal that would hinder his career and prevent him from leaving Intelligence or even being promoted to the rank of Detective, Atwater takes a third option when he confronts and threatens to sue Nolan and the Chicago Police Department if the hazing continues while the crooked cop agrees to back off.
151	3	"Tender Age"	Eriq La Salle	Gwen Sigan	January 13, 2021 (Note: This episode was originally scheduled to air on January 6, 2021,, but was replaced by a rerun of season 7 episode "Before the Fall" in the Pacific and Mountain time zone, due to news coverage of the January 6 United States Capitol attack.)	803	6.58
While on patrol, Burgess and Ruzek discover a little girl wandering the streets alone and also discover that her family had been murdered and she is the only witness. Though awkward at first, Burgess is able to get the girl, Makayla, to open up and forms a bond with her. The unit soon learns that Makayla's biological father was responsible for the murders because he was trying to get his daughter back. After he is apprehended, Burgess bids farewell to Makayla as she goes to live with family and expresses to Ruzek that she still harbors a desire for motherhood but is uncertain of her ability to be both a mother and a cop due to her previous miscarriage. Meanwhile, Upton is offered a job with the FBI in New York but turns it down and finally expresses her feelings for Halstead, which leads to him kissing her.
152	4	"Unforgiven"	Chad Saxton	Rick Eid & Gavin Harris	January 27, 2021 (Note: This episode was originally scheduled to air on January 13, 2021, but was replaced in the United States by "Tender Age", which was postponed from the previous Wednesday.)	804	5.97
The Intelligence unit investigates the murder of a Chicago police officer. Upton soon discovers that the suspect might have had a grudge against the officer prior to the murder. However, surveillance photos lead the detectives in a different direction to a domestic abuse victim that the officer was assisting, and they soon realize that her abusive ex-boyfriend was the true culprit. Meanwhile, Voight struggles to get the Deputy Superintendent on board with the investigation. Also, Upton and Halstead reignite their romance, and Upton finds herself unable to face her father due to his abusive history after learning he has suffered a medical emergency.
153	5	"In Your Care"	Charles S. Carroll	Gwen Sigan	February 3, 2021 (Note: This episode was originally scheduled to air on January 20, 2021, but was replaced by a rerun of season 7 episode "Silence of the Night", due to news coverage of the inauguration of Joe Biden.)	805	6.09
The Intelligence Unit investigates a rash of violent carjackings and learns that the offenders are a group of foster teens and members of a teen sex working ring who have aged out of the fostering system or will soon. After apprehending one of them, Burgess learns that the teens are robbing their johns in the hopes of building a better life for themselves and finds herself conflicted, believing that the system has let them down. In addition to this investigation, Burgess learns that Makayla's (the girl she helped two episodes earlier) cousin has been unable to care for her, leading Burgess to make an impulsive and potentially life-changing decision.
154	6	"Equal Justice"	Eric Laneuville	Daniel Arkin	February 10, 2021	806	6.31
While on a stakeout, the Intelligence Unit's cover gets blown while finding a man who is caught selling heroin. The man reveals that he is working for a gang to find out who had killed his son who was not involved in gangs. Halstead soon discovers that the son might have been killed over a relationship.
155	7	"Instinct"	Chad Saxton	Scott Gold	February 17, 2021	807	5.87
After a series of meth drug dealers get killed in an ambush, Ruzek enlists the help of his top CI who has knowledge of gangs and dealers in Chicago. Ruzek soon realizes that his CI is not fully clean of meth and may compromise the investigation.
156	8	"Protect and Serve"	Eriq La Salle	Gwen Sigan & Ike Smith	March 10, 2021	808	5.89
Deputy Superintendent Miller asks the Intelligence Unit to arrest and protect seasoned patrol officer Dave Wheelan (Michael Rispoli) after he was caught on video murdering a young black man at a routine traffic stop. When the footage is uploaded on social media and goes viral, Ruzek and Atwater are ambushed at the CPD safehouse, which Voight suspects might be an inside job. Ruzek and Atwater clash about what went down, while Wheelan insists he was acting in self defense.
157	9	"Impossible Dream"	Charles S. Carroll	Rick Eid & Gavin Harris	March 17, 2021	809	6.21
Miller asks Voight to use Officer Andre Cooper as part of an undercover operation to take down a gang member when a local business owner is gunned down in cold blood. Later, Cooper begins to bond with the suspect, telling him about his personal life. Things get personal for Atwater, as he used to patrol the same streets when he was a patrol officer.
158	10	"The Radical Truth"	Lisa Demaine	Scott Gold	March 31, 2021	810	6.42
Ruzek's father, Officer "Disco" Bob Ruzek, is kidnapped by a gang who wants the identity of a valuable confidential informant in exchange for his life, and the Intelligence Unit must find a way to rescue him without endangering the CI. While investigating, Ruzek learns a devastating secret about his dad that could affect his own future with CPD and Intelligence, and a sudden development in the case results in a rift forming in Ruzek and Burgess's relationship.
159	11	"Signs of Violence"	Bethany Rooney	Gwen Sigan	April 7, 2021	811	5.80
The Intelligence Unit investigates the disappearance and abduction of small family with a history of domestic violence and financial fraud with the case stirs up painful childhood memories for Upton, causing her to lock horns with Voight over how to solve it. Meanwhile, Upton and Halstead's relationship reaches an apparent impasse after Upton finds herself unable to respond to Halstead's declaration of love for her.
160	12	"Due Process"	Guy Ferland	Rick Eid & Gavin Harris	April 21, 2021	812	5.89
The Intelligence unit investigates a serial rapist who has committed a series of murders and leaves little to no evidence. After Deputy Superintendent Miller argues that the CPD should go by the books when it comes to police work, Voight tries to resist his normal tendencies when it comes to his way of investigating. Miller asks Voight to include a suspended Detective, who was leading the original investigation, for help but Voight later has cause to worry that she may get too involved in it.
161	13	"Trouble Dolls"	John Polson	Scott Gold	May 5, 2021 (Note: This episode was originally scheduled to air on April 28, 2021, but was preempted due to President Joe Biden's presidential address to the joint session of Congress.)	813	5.67
The Intelligence investigates the brutal murder of a young pregnant woman involved illegally in a fake adoption ring, Meanwhile, Burgess contemplates a decision about who should be responsible for raising her newly adopted daughter, Makayla if something happened to her.
162	14	"Safe"	S. J. Main Muñoz	Gavin Harris	May 12, 2021	814	5.94
As the team investigates a rash of brutal home invasions, Upton finds herself wondering if her relationship with Halstead is affecting her police work and immerses herself into the case in an effort to prove otherwise. Voight begins to suspect that Upton and Halstead are romantically involved.
163	15	"The Right Thing"	Vince Misiano	Rick Eid & Gwen Sigan	May 19, 2021	815	5.64
An attempt to help a newly minted CI get out of a drug debt inadvertently leads to a major clandestine criminal operation. As the Unit investigates and attempts to shut it down, clashing ideologies between Voight and Deputy Superintendent Miller and efforts to adhere to the reformed police policy impede the investigation, and Deputy Superintendent Miller begins to second guess her own decisions when someone close to her is endangered. Burgess is hurt during an investigation. (Part 1 of 2)
164	16	"The Other Side"	Chad Saxton	Rick Eid & Gwen Sigan	May 26, 2021	816	6.33
Burgess is assaulted and kidnapped during an investigation, and the Intelligence Unit find themselves in a race against time to rescue her before it is too late. Tensions and tempers mount, resulting in Ruzek and Atwater coming to blows when they disagree on the proper course of action to take while Burgess struggles to stay alive after being shot and left for dead, and Voight crosses a familiar yet dangerous line in his determination to find her. (Part 2 of 2)

== Production ==
Filming for season 8 began October 6, 2020. On September 22, 2020, Nicole Ari Parker joined the cast as Deputy Superintendent Samantha Miller. On October 26, 2020, Jason Beghe confirmed that the season would address police brutality and racism, following the police murder of George Floyd, its worldwide protests, and the Black Lives Matter movement. In December 2020, Cleveland Berto was announced to be joining the cast as a series regular in the role of Jalen Walker. The character was later renamed Andre Cooper and Berto was only credited in three episodes as a guest star.

== Ratings ==
Viewership and ratings per episode of Chicago P.D. season 8
No.	Title	Air date	Rating (18–49)	Viewers (millions)	DVR (18–49)	DVR viewers (millions)	Total (18–49)	Total viewers (millions)
1	"Fighting Ghosts"	November 11, 2020	1.0	6.43	0.9	4.04	1.8	10.48
2	"White Knuckle"	November 18, 2020	0.8	6.38	0.8	3.62	1.6	10.01
3	"Tender Age"	January 13, 2021	1.0	6.58	0.8	3.66	1.8	10.25
4	"Unforgiven"	January 27, 2021	0.9	5.97	—N/a	—N/a	—N/a	—N/a
5	"In Your Care"	February 3, 2021	0.8	6.09	—N/a	—N/a	—N/a	—N/a
6	"Equal Justice"	February 10, 2021	0.9	6.31	0.8	3.80	1.7	10.12
7	"Instinct"	February 17, 2021	0.9	5.87	0.8	3.76	1.6	9.64
8	"Protect and Serve"	March 10, 2021	0.8	5.89	0.7	3.73	1.6	9.62
9	"Impossible Dream"	March 17, 2021	0.9	6.21	—N/a	—N/a	—N/a	—N/a
10	"The Radical Truth"	March 31, 2021	1.0	6.42	—N/a	—N/a	—N/a	—N/a
11	"Signs of Violence"	April 7, 2021	0.8	5.80	0.7	3.58	1.5	9.38
12	"Due Process"	April 21, 2021	0.9	5.89	—N/a	—N/a	—N/a	—N/a
13	"Trouble Dolls"	May 5, 2021	0.9	5.67	0.7	3.45	1.6	9.12
14	"Safe"	May 12, 2021	0.8	5.94	0.6	3.31	1.5	9.25
15	"The Right Thing"	May 19, 2021	0.8	5.64	0.6	3.50	1.4	9.14
16	"The Other Side"	May 26, 2021	0.9	6.33	0.6	3.25	1.5	9.58
