= Kim Burgess =

Fictional character

Kim Burgess-Ruzek
- Chicago P.D. character
- First appearance: Chicago P.D.: Stepping Stone (episode 1.01)
- Created by: Matt Olmstead
- Portrayed by: Marina Squerciati

In-universe information
- Full name: Kimberly Burgess
- Aliases: Kimberly Ruzek; Kimberly Burgess-Ruzek
- Nicknames: Kim; Burge
- Gender: Female
- Occupation: Police officer Flight Attendant (formerly)
- Family: Nicole Silver (sister); Zoey Silver (niece)
- Spouses: Adam Ruzek (m. 2025)
- Significant others: Sean Roman (ex-boyfriend); Blair Williams (boyfriend; deceased); Matt Miller (ex-boyfriend)
- Children: Makayla Ward Burgess (adoptive daughter); Unborn child (miscarriage)
- Relatives: Bob Ruzek (father-in-law; deceased); Unnamed mother-in-law Kate Ruzek (sister-in-law); Sam (nephew); Mike (uncle-in-law); Unnamed aunt-in-law Jordan Silver (former brother-in-law)
- Nationality: American
- Date of birth: November 24, 1988

Police career
- Department: Chicago Police Department: Intelligence Unit (S4–present); Patrol (S1–4)
- Years of service: 2011 - present
- Rank: Detective
- Badge No.: 56686
- Radio Code: 5021 Eddie

Kimberly "Kim" Burgess-Ruzek is a fictional character from the American police procedural Chicago P.D., played by Marina Squerciati. She made her first appearance in the pilot episode "Stepping Stone", which was broadcast on NBC on January 8, 2014. At the start of the show, Burgess was a patrol officer of the Chicago Police Department's 21st District. She also appears in a recurring role in Chicago Fire. As of season 12, she was promoted, and is presently a detective with the Intelligence Unit.

== Casting ==
On August 28, 2013, Nellie Andreeva from Deadline Hollywood reported that actress Marina Squerciati had been cast in the regular role of Kim Burgess in Chicago Fire spin-off series Chicago P.D. Burgess was initially billed as "a feisty, sassy former flight attendant-turned-cop whose beauty belies a formidable inner strength." Following the conclusion of the first season, Squerciati was prepared to go back to her paralegal job, until NBC renewed Chicago P.D. for a second season.

Squerciati took maternity leave from the show in March 2017, and Kim made her temporary departure in the season four episode "Last Minute Resistance".

== Development ==
Squerciati liked her character's "energy and happiness" and said, "I'm hoping that she maintains some of that joy. I think part of it is because she's green, but another part of it is because she's a driven, joyful person. She knows what she wants." Squerciati liked that Burgess was not the perfect officer and made mistakes, as she found it very relatable.

In the show, Burgess wants to be promoted to the Intelligence Unit, but her partner Kevin Atwater (LaRoyce Hawkins) is promoted over her. Squerciati was "taken aback" by the development and explained "when I read it, I went to executive producer Derek Haas and writer Michael Brandt and said, 'Are you kidding me? I didn't make Intelligence?' I kind of mixed up that I wasn't really Kim Burgess." The incident made Squerciati realize that she had become protective of her character and was upset for her. She also thought Burgess and Atwater's friendship would be tested by his promotion. Sgt. Hank Voight (Jason Beghe) later offers Burgess a promotion to Intelligence, but she turns it down. Squerciati commented that Burgess would question whether she had made a mistake and Squerciati hoped it was not a one-time offer.

== Storylines ==
In her fictional backstory, Burgess was a flight attendant for three years before joining the CPD Academy. A native of St. Charles, she was born sometime in 1988. Burgess starts the series as a patrol officer and a potential candidate for Intelligence. She has a good partnership with her partner, Kevin Atwater. Both are constant targets of Desk Sergeant Trudy Platt's attitude. However, they are generally able to laugh it off after shift. When a woman is caught shoplifting bread to feed her son, Burgess pays for it and threatens the unyielding shopkeeper with fines for expired licenses. In a separate incident with a hoarder, Burgess discovers a kidnapped child hidden in the woman's basement. Kim and Officer Adam Ruzek have a close working friendship, frequently spending time bantering at work. Adam even helps her get revenge on Platt, who treats Burgess and Atwater horribly. After a particularly stressful call, Adam and Kim share a kiss. Kim regrets this almost instantly as Adam is engaged. However, after he breaks off his engagement, Kim and Adam begin a romantic relationship. In season 2, after Atwater is transferred to Intelligence, she is partnered with Officer Sean Roman.

At the end of "Called in Dead", while Roman and his former partner are arguing outside, Burgess is shot in the shoulder by a shotgun shell connected to a trip wire, which was set as a trap and connected to the doorbell. Upon investigation, in "Shouldn't Have Been Alone", it is learned that the house itself was booby trapped, and it was intended for police officers, by a murderer, Spencer York. She spends two weeks on administrative duty while nursing back to health. On her first shift back, she serves as the district's desk sergeant while Platt rides with Roman. After her shooting, Sgt. Voight offers her a promotion to Intelligence, but she declines in order to remain a patrol officer.

In "What Do You Do", Burgess and Roman (while on a meal break) respond to a suspicious activity in a warehouse, which was to be a drug deal, without calling for backup. She manages to kill a suspect with a shard of glass from a window on the floor. They manage to get out of there when Ruzek calls her and she never answers, causing the Intelligence unit to go into the warehouse to catch the suspect about to drive away. Her partner is seriously wounded during the ordeal. Kim makes it back to the precinct, complimented by Platt, and garnering a slow clap from a crowd of cops for saving her partner's life and taking down the suspects.

In "There's My Girl", Burgess is promoted to Intelligence after Atwater is demoted following a suspect's suicide while in custody. In "Born Into Bad News", she accepts Ruzek's offer of marriage when she discovers he has placed an engagement ring in her locker.

At the end of "Looking Out for Stateville" Kim calls off the wedding to Ruzek, in the very same place he proposed. In doing so, Burgess then applies for a transfer to a new district in "Hit Me" which Platt is very shocked and upset to hear, surprisingly. Both Burgess and Ruzek feel devastated but try to hide it. During "Hit Me", Kim is involved in a car crash, which results Ruzek rushing to her side. She feels uncomfortable and finds an excuse to leave.

After Kim breaks up with Ruzek she starts to have feelings for her partner, Roman. This creates some tension between Roman and Ruzek.

In "Justice" Burgess is investigated for shooting a hooded man who opens fire on their patrol car whilst Burgess and Roman were kissing, when the man has no gun in his hand. The gun is however later found in the water. Roman asks Burgess to go with him to San Diego; however, after realizing that this is what she wants to do, she decides to stay in Chicago.

In season 4 "The Silos" Burgess meets her new partner, Julie Tay. In "A War Zone", Officer Tay is reassigned to her old job after her Commander Fogel goes over Platt's head in revenge of what Platt did against Fogel. Then, in "Some Friend", Sorensen becomes Burgess's partner before resigning in "A Shot Heard Around the World" due to the stress of a targeted shooting of two police officers. Burgess is offered a job in the Intelligence Unit, which she takes.

At the beginning of her time in Intelligence, she clashes with her partner Alvin Olinsky, but she eventually earns his respect in "Sanctuary" when she saves his life by taking down a suspect who holds him at gunpoint, breaking the suspect's arm in the process.

In "Little Bit of Light", Burgess' sister Nicole is in town and immediately clashes with Ruzek, before revealing to a stunned Burgess that she is getting a divorce. In "Last Minute Resistance", when her sister is found in the subway and also a victim of a brutal sexual assault, and her friend missing (later found dead from hypothermia in an abandoned parking lot); she takes the case very personally and stops at nothing to solve the case. It is revealed to be two men who had put Ketamine in women's drinks and taken advantage of them. When one of the men tries to sexually assault Burgess; she stabs him on a shoulder with a lipstick that had a knife in it, and then beats him. She takes some time off to take care of her sister and her niece.

In "The Thing About Heroes", she mentors an officer named Frank Toma. When a terrorist attack happens at a street festival that claims many lives, he goes missing with many people convinced that he had something to do with it. While clearing his name, she disobeys orders to get evidence. When she is called to the lake by Toma (knowing that there is nothing to be done) he commits suicide in front of her, leaving her distraught. It is soon discovered that a fellow officer and partner had contributed to his problems even further prior to the investigation, when he found out that he was gay and Muslim. She vows to bring him down.

Also in season-5, she starts a relationship with federal prosecutor Matt Miller. Things get rocky in "Politics", when he becomes a subject of the investigation into a Ukrainian girl's death in the Senator's hotel. She has to choose between Voight's loyalty and her boyfriend. In "Monster", she reveals to Ruzek that he is still not talking to her, leaving their relationship uncertain.

In "Confidential", she gets her first confidential informant. The informant reveals a possible murder which Burgess discounts but Upton pursues, revealing a corpse which ultimately leads to a prostitution ring. But when Burgess's informant ends up dead, Upton and Burgess butt heads on how to handle confidential informants. At the end of the episode, Burgess turns to her former lover Ruzek ending up in a one-night stand.

In "Sisterhood", she reveals that her sister's attackers only received three years, with them only serving one year for good behavior. In "Homecoming", upon hearing that her former partner, Olinsky has died from injuries sustained from the stabbing, she is distraught about the events that play out. And she is tasked by Voight to clear Olinsky's desk. She slaps the wife of a drug runner when she refuses to cooperate.

In "Ride Along", she is requested by Deputy Superintendent Brennan to do a ride-along with Kendra, the daughter of a VIP, who wants to be a police officer. Things go sideways when she is involved in a shootout while on a call by Halstead to look for a car involved in a crime. Burgess leaves Kendra in the car while she goes to help a wounded victim; when she gets back, the girl is gone. Burgess later finds the girl at her mom's apartment. Voight sits Burgess down and urges her to tell the review board the truth in her hearing the next day. While looking for the shooter, she is summoned by Brennan into her office. In her office, Brennan tells Burgess not to follow Voight's advice; she is a “female hero” and that is good PR, so she should lie and claim Kendra was not there. Conflicted, Burgess decides to take Brennan's side, and tells the review board that she was alone in her patrol car during the shooting. It gets complicated when Burgess takes testimony from a witness who claims Kendra saw the shooter, which would then destroy her lie to the review board. She runs directly to Brennan, who then acts like she never said anything about omitting Kendra, and is “confident” Burgess can find a way out of the situation. With evidence assuring that Kendra saw the shooter, she appeals to Kendra's “make a difference” desire, and gets her to come down to the district for a photo lineup. She identifies Trent as the shooter. After finding and saving Trent's life, Burgess decides that she is going to return to the review board and tell the truth. Later on, Voight snaps at her for not taking his advice, after, she punches her locker in frustration. Platt drops by and tells her to not switch sides.

In "Ties that Bind", she, along with Upton, is kidnapped by gun buyers pretending to buy the cop killer bullets from them. They are eventually rescued by her team with Upton almost killing one of the captors. In "The Forgotten", she gets into a relationship with Superintendent Kelton's mayoral election aide, Blair Williams. Their relationship later ends in "What Could Have Been", when Blair is murdered. The killer is Ray Price's wife, Alicia Price, who confesses to killing him to protect her daughter as Blair was attempting to blackmail Ray to drop out of the race. Ray ends up taking the fall for her.

In "No Regrets", after being mildly injured on the job, Burgess learns that she is pregnant. She decides to keep the baby and Ruzek stands beside her. Squerciati told the Meet Us At Molly's podcast on November 15, 2019 that the baby was originally intended to be Williams'. While temporarily working as a 911 dispatcher in "I Was Here", Burgess takes a call about a possible domestic violence incident. She follows the location of the call and finds a person has been murdered. She is physically assaulted by a sexual predator while saving the victim who made the 911 call, and she has a miscarriage.

Burgess becomes the guardian of Makayla Ward in season 8, a girl that she and Ruzek discovered walking in the streets after most of her family was murdered and her remaining relative is unable to handle the pressure of being a parent.

While searching for two people behind a major criminal operation, Burgess is kidnapped by one of them and shot by the other and left for dead in an attempt to tie up loose ends. She manages to make her way to a car before passing out due to blood loss, and is found by Halstead and Atwater after she manages to turn on the car's turn signal before passing out.

In Season 12 episode "Pawns", after initially hesitating about her promotion to detective due potentially owing favors or favoritism, Burgess finally makes Detective.

== Reception ==
Kate Stanhope from TV Guide observed, "You gotta hand it to Officer Kim Burgess of Chicago P.D. She has a real knack for sniffing out trouble. It's good for the residents of the Windy City, but bad for Burgess (Marina Squerciati) and, oftentimes, her partner Officer Sean Roman (Brian Geraghty)." During her review of season 2 episode "What Do You Do", Lisa Casas for ScreenSpy praised Squerciati's performance, saying she "holds her own in an episode that was good enough, but didn't quite deliver the grit that we expect from PD." The pairing of Burgess and Ruzek has become popular with viewers, who refer to the couple with the portmanteau "Burzek".

== Partners ==
- Officer Kevin Atwater (Season 1)
- Officer Delaney (Season 1, Episode 15)
- Officer Sean Roman (Seasons 2 – 3)
- Officer Julie Tay (Season 4, episodes 1 – 5)
- Officer Mike Sorenson (Season 4, episodes 6 – 8)
- Officer Frank Toma
- Detective Alvin Olinsky (Season 4, Episode 9 – Season 5, Episode 2)
- Detective Antonio Dawson (Season 5, Episode 3 – Season 6)
- Detective Jay Halstead (Season 7, Episode 3)
- Officer Adam Ruzek (Season 7 – present)

== Appearances and crossovers ==
She often appears on Chicago Fire, Chicago Med, Chicago Justice, and made an appearance on Law & Order: Special Victims Unit

- Chicago Fire - "Tonight's The Night" (January 21, 2014)
- Chicago Fire - "A Dark Day" (April 29, 2014)
- Chicago Fire - "Apologies Are Dangerous" (October 14, 2014)
- Chicago Fire - "Forgiving, Relentless, Unconditional" (March 17, 2015)
- Chicago Fire - "You Know Where to Find Me" (April 21, 2015)
- Law & Order: Special Victims Unit - "Daydream Believer" (April 29, 2015)
- Chicago Fire (season 4):
  - "Regarding This Wedding" (November 10, 2015)
  - "2112" (November 17, 2015)
  - "The Beating Heart" (January 5, 2016)
  - "All Hard Parts" (February 9, 2016)
  - "What Happened to Courtney" (March 29, 2016)
  - "On the Warpath" (April 5, 2016)
- Chicago Med - "iNO" (November 24, 2015)
- Chicago Med - "Us" (April 5, 2016)
- Chicago Fire - "The Hose or the Animal" (October 11, 2016)
- Chicago Fire - "Deathtrap" (March 1, 2017)
- Chicago Justice - "Uncertainty Principle" (March 5, 2017)
- Chicago Fire - "Hiding Not Seeking" (March 8, 2018)
- Chicago Fire - "Looking for a Lifeline" (March 22, 2018)
- Chicago Med - "Heavy Is The Head" (October 10, 2018)
- Chicago Fire - "This Isn't Charity" (October 17, 2018)
- Chicago Fire - "The Plunge" (February 6, 2019)
- Chicago Med - "All the Honely Hearts" (March 27, 2019)
- Chicago Med - "More Harm Than Good" (May 8, 2019)
- Chicago Fire (season 8):
  - "Badlands" (October 9, 2019)
  - "Infection, Part I" (October 16, 2019)
  - "Welcome to Crazytown" (November 6, 2019)
  - "Off the Grid" (February 26, 2020)
- Chicago Med - "Infection, Part II" (October 16, 2019)
- Chicago Fire - "Rattle Second City" (November 11, 2020)
