= Chicago Med season 4 =

Chicago Med
- Season 4
- Chicago Med Season 4 DVD cover
- Showrunners: Andrew Schneider; Diane Frolov
- No. of episodes: 22

Release
- Original network: NBC
- Original release: September 26, 2018 – May 22, 2019

Season chronology
- ← Previous; Season 3 Next → Season 5

The fourth season of Chicago Med, an American medical drama television series with executive producer Dick Wolf, and producers Michael Brandt, Peter Jankowski, Andrew Schneider and René Balcer (uncredited), was ordered on May 9, 2018. The season premiered on September 26, 2018, with a time slot change from Tuesday at 10:00 PM to Wednesday at 8:00 PM. The season concludes on May 22, 2019, and contained 22 episodes.

== Cast ==
=== Main characters ===
- Nick Gehlfuss as Dr. Will Halstead, Attending Emergency Physician
- Yaya DaCosta as April Sexton, RN
- Torrey DeVitto as Dr. Natalie "Nat" Manning, Emergency Medicine/Pediatrics Fellow
- Colin Donnell as Dr. Connor Rhodes, Attending Trauma Surgeon
- Brian Tee as LCDR Dr. Ethan Choi, Attending Emergency Physician
- Marlyne Barrett as Maggie Lockwood, RN, ED Charge Nurse
- Norma Kuhling as Dr. Ava Bekker, Cardiothoracic Surgery Attending
- S. Epatha Merkerson as Sharon Goodwin, Chief of Patient Services
- Oliver Platt as Dr. Daniel Charles, Chief of Psychiatry

=== Recurring characters ===
- Brennan Brown as Dr. Samuel "Sam" Abrams
- Ato Essandoh as Dr. Isidore Latham
- D. W. Moffett as Cornelius Rhodes
- Mekia Cox as Dr. Robin Charles
- Cynthia Addai-Robinson as Dr. Vicki Glass
- C. S. Lee as Bernard "Bernie" Kim
- Arden Cho as Emily Choi
- Molly Bernard as Dr. Elsa Curry
- Heather Headley as Gwen Garrett, Gaffney's Chief Operating Officer
- Anna Enger Ritch as Agent Ingrid Lee
- Patti Murin as Dr. Nina Shore
- Roland Buck III as Dr. Noah Sexton
- Nate Santana as Dr. James Lanik
- Casey Tutton as Nurse Monique Lawson
- Lorena Diaz as Nurse Doris
- Amanda Marcheschi as Nurse Dina Garston
- Peter Mark Kendall as Joey Thomas
- Colby Lewis as Terry McNeal
- Dennis Cockrum as Ray Burke
- Devin Ratray as Tommy Burke
- Adam Petchel as Timothy "Tim" Burke
- Paula Newsome as Caroline "Cece" Charles
- Ian Harding as Phillip Davis
- Jeremy Shouldis as Dr. Marty Peterson, an anesthesiologist at Gaffney

=== Guest stars ===
- Rachel DiPillo as Dr. Sarah Reese (episode 1)
- Michel Gill as Robert Haywood (episode 1)
- Eddie Jemison as Dr. Stanley Stohl (episode 1)
- Marc Grapey as Peter Kalmick (episode 11)

=== Crossover characters ===
- Jesse Spencer as Captain Matthew Casey
- Taylor Kinney as Lieutenant Kelly Severide
- Eamonn Walker as Chief Wallace Boden
- David Eigenberg as Lieutenant Christopher Hermann
- Yuri Sardarov as Firefighter Brian "Otis" Zvonecek
- Joe Minoso as Firefighter Joe Cruz
- Christian Stolte as Firefighter Randy "Mouch" McHolland
- Miranda Rae Mayo as Firefighter Stella Kidd
- Randy Flagler as Firefighter Harold Capp
- Kara Killmer as Paramedic in Charge Sylvie Brett
- Jason Beghe as Sergeant Hank Voight
- Jesse Lee Soffer as Detective Jay Halstead
- Tracy Spiridakos as Detective Hailey Upton
- Patrick John Flueger as Adam Ruzek
- Marina Squerciati as Officer Kim Burgess

== Episodes ==
No. overall	No. in season	Title	Directed by	Written by	Original release date	Prod. code	U.S. viewers (millions)
62	1	"Be My Better Half"	Michael Waxman	Diane Frolov & Andrew Schneider	September 26, 2018	401	7.78
Sharon immediately begins clashing with the new COO of the hospital when Dr. Rhodes requests to have an OR in the Emergency Department. Meanwhile, Dr. Charles deals with the fallout from Dr. Reese’s father, as Dr. Reese leaves Chicago Med, unable to trust him. Dr. Manning accepts Dr. Halstead’s proposal and they immediately begin arguing about wedding plans. Dr. Bekker does everything in her power to get Dr. Rhodes to stay in Chicago. Also, Dr. Choi tries to convince April that his sister is not abusing drugs.
63	2	"When to Let Go"	Charles S. Carroll	Diane Frolov & Andrew Schneider & Danny Weiss	October 3, 2018	402	8.83
Stella Kidd is rushed to the hospital with the possibility of losing one of her lungs, threatening to end her career. Dr. Halstead’s father is admitted and later dies from his injuries. Dr. Manning and Dr. Bekker treat a badly burned patient who has a long road to recovery. However, her parents want to end her life. Dr. Charles admits Otis Zvonecek, thinking that he might have post traumatic stress syndrome following his previous injury. Meanwhile, Dr. Choi treats a patient from an apartment fire and is convinced that she had been beaten before the fire started. This episode continues a crossover with Chicago Fire and Chicago P.D. that begins on "Going to War" and concludes on "Endings". It is included on the Chicago Fire Season 7 and Chicago P.D. Season 6 DVD sets.
64	3	"Heavy Is the Head"	Michael Waxman	Jeff Drayer	October 10, 2018	403	8.15
Dr. Choi treats a sick child who needs a kidney transplant. His father is a match, but it is revealed that he kidnapped the child. Dr. Manning and medical student Elsa Curry treat a pregnant patient who refuses emergency surgery. Dr. Rhodes performs a risky surgery in the new hybrid OR and asks Maggie for assistance. Dr. Halstead looks into a wedding hall. Sharon continues to butt heads with the COO.
65	4	"Backed Against the Wall"	Vincent Misiano	Eli Talbert	October 17, 2018	404	7.71
Dr. Halstead deals with the CPD when he gets involved with a man who is being investigated for accepting kickbacks. Dr. Rhodes' hybrid OR officially opens. Dr. Manning tends to a cancer patient who is an undocumented immigrant, as well as her brother. Dr. Choi tends to a patient with a strong personality who is lying about her identity. Dr. Choi meets Emily’s boyfriend.
66	5	"What You Don't Know"	Donald Petrie	Stephen Hootstein	October 24, 2018	405	7.68
Dr. Halstead goes undercover to help the FBI take down Ray Burke. Meanwhile, Dr. Bekker and Dr. Charles treat a patient with Huntington's disease who is refusing visitors. Dr. Choi and April learn that Emily's boyfriend, Bernie, is married with a child. Dr. Manning treats a patient whom she suspects to be a victim of sexual assault.
67	6	"Lesser of Two Evils"	Martha Mitchell	Safura Fadavi & Meridith Friedman	October 31, 2018	406	7.77
Dr. Manning and Dr. Halstead pull an unusual stunt when they suspect their patient is the victim of abuse. Dr. Choi and Dr. Charles treat a patient who needs a liver transplant. They soon discover that she was illegally adopted. Meanwhile, Dr. Rhodes' patience is put to the test when the Chief of Emergency Medicine comes down hard on one of the medical students.
68	7	"The Poison Inside Us"	Milena Govich	Jeff Drayer & Joseph Sousa	November 7, 2018	407	8.42
The hospital is put into an emergency situation when a toxic spill puts everyone in danger---created by the still-grieving husband of a woman Dr. Choi couldn't save. Dr. Choi is one of the exposed. During the situation, Dr. Manning and Dr. Charles are forced to perform a C-section on a pregnant patient. Dr. Halstead continues to assist the FBI but clashes with the bureau's action officer over his devotion to his medical duties. Also, Dr. Bekker admits to Dr. Rhodes that his father was the primary donor for his hybrid Operating Room.
69	8	"Play by My Rules"	Valerie Weiss	Eli Talbert & Daniel Sinclair	November 14, 2018	408	7.53
Dr. Rhodes and Sharon butt heads when Sharon decides to use the hybrid OR for general surgeries to boost cost efficiency. All the stress that Dr. Halstead continues to deal with begins to affect him and he takes it out on Dr. Manning while dealing with a patient with a DNR tattoo on his chest. Dr. Choi and Dr. Charles deal with a patient who has a mental disorder that won't allow her to stop scratching her scalp, even though she has scratched down to her skull. Maggie is called in for surgery and asks April to be the charge nurse.
70	9	"Death Do Us Part"	Fred Berner	Stephen Hootstein & Paul R. Puri	December 5, 2018	409	7.91
On their wedding day, Will is kidnapped by Ray Burke's sons and forced by them to perform emergency surgery on Ray. They reveal they found the listening device the FBI had Will plant during a house call. Natalie fears that she might have been left at the altar. Meanwhile, Dr. Charles deals with a patient who stabbed her husband, saying he was an imposter. Dr. Choi deals with a pregnant patient with a difficult delivery. Will and Jay Halstead show up at the church, but only long enough to let Natalie know that CPD and the FBI are placing Will into protective custody, fearing he is in danger from the Burkes.
71	10	"All the Lonely People"	Michael Waxman	Diane Frolov & Andrew Schneider	January 9, 2019	410	8.54
April is wounded during a drive by shooting in front of the hospital. Dr. Charles asks Elsa Curry to help him with a psychological evaluation. Dr. Choi tends to the perpetrator. Meanwhile, Dr. Manning is forced to perform an emergency C-section when a pregnant patient dies of an aneurysm. Also, Dr. Halstead returns to Chicago after being in the Witness Protection Program. At the gala Dr. Rhodes and Dr. Bekker attend to celebrate the new hybrid OR, Dr. Bekker tells Connor that his father is spreading lies about sleeping with her and Connor punches his father.
72	11	"Who Can You Trust"	Charles S. Carroll	Story by : Meridith Friedman; Teleplay by : Safura Fadavi & Meridith Friedman	January 16, 2019	411	8.51
Dr. Halstead continues to feel the effects of PTSD and takes it out on a pregnant patient who is a surrogate with a dying fetus. Dr. Choi and April butt heads on their past relationship and hospital protocol when it comes to a homeless veteran Choi rescued from a street mugger---and who's a battle amputee suffering a heart attack. Meanwhile, Dr. Charles tends to a patient who is suspected to have Alzheimer's, but her caregiver might be overdosing her. Also, Dr. Rhodes and Dr. Bekker disagree on a liver transplant for a patient.
73	12	"The Things We Do"	Carl Seaton	Jeff Drayer & Danny Weiss	January 23, 2019	412	9.41
Dr. Halstead rushes to Dr. Manning's aid when her med-evac helicopter is forced to make a crash landing. The two reconcile---contingent on Will keeping his promise to get rid of the gun he bought for protection following the FBI operation that endangered him. Meanwhile, Dr. Choi tends to a patient who is an alcoholic and learns his son tried to kill himself. Meanwhile, Dr. Rhodes and Dr. Bekker put their differences aside when tending to a pregnant patient who has Down syndrome. Also, a medical student makes a critical mistake with a patient. Elsewhere, Sharon helps Dr. Charles set up an online dating profile.
74	13	"Ghosts in the Attic"	Michael Pressman	Story by : Stephen Hootstein & Joseph Sousa; Teleplay by : Stephen Hootstein & Joseph Sousa & Jason Cho	February 6, 2019	413	9.37
The nurses in the ED avoid treating Dr. Choi's patient, a child molester whose victims include one of their own ranks. When the patient dies, Dr. Choi suspects that it might have been an overdose. Meanwhile, Dr. Halstead's gun is stolen when his car is burglarized. Dr. Manning suspects a patient might be faking a cancer diagnosis and harming himself with rat poison. Also, Dr. Rhodes and Dr. Bekker perform surgery on an HIV-positive patient with broken ribs, and Dr. Bekker cuts herself. Natalie gives Will the engagement ring back after learning that he kept the gun, thus ending their relationship.
75	14	"Can't Unring That Bell"	Lin Oeding	Diane Frolov & Andrew Schneider and Daniel Sinclair	February 13, 2019	414	8.73
Dr. Halstead’s personal life continues to affect his performance as a doctor. Dr. Charles and Dr. Choi tend to a patient who is struggling to get sober from drugs. Maggie goes to extreme measures when trying to help a patient who needs a kidney transplant. Connor and Ava finally come to an agreement after a patient dies.
76	15	"We Hold These Truths"	Nicole Rubio	Eli Talbert & Paul R. Puri	February 20, 2019	415	9.11
Chaos ensues after a white supremacist crashes his car into a local festival, forcing Dr. Manning and Maggie to perform emergency triage. Meanwhile, some of the victims begin to pour into the hospital. Dr. Choi deals with a patient with kidney stones and discovers a secret about his medical student. After a patient is declared brain-dead, Sharon is forced to ask the patient's mother to donate her organs. Also, Dr. Rhodes is surprised to see Robin has returned to Chicago.
77	16	"Old Flames, New Sparks"	Elodie Keene	Story by : Safura Fadavi; Teleplay by : Safura Fadavi & Meridith Friedman	February 27, 2019	416	8.48
Dr. Halstead discovers a woman frozen in the snow. He soon discovers that his patient has a problem with alcohol. Meanwhile, Dr. Manning makes a house call to Phillip Davis, whose wife died giving birth to their baby. Also, Dr. Rhodes refuses to perform surgery on Robin's mother for health reasons. However, Dr. Bekker goes over his head. Dr. Choi and April tend to a patient with an aggressive cancer whose parents are using his younger brother as an organ donor.
78	17	"The Space Between Us"	Daniela De Carlo	Story by : Danny Weiss & Ryan Michael Johnson; Teleplay by : Danny Weiss & Jeff Drayer	March 27, 2019	417	8.08
Danger ensues as a car slams into the bay doors of the hospital. Dr. Choi makes difficult decisions between saving a co-worker's life who is trapped under the car and keeping April safe. Meanwhile, Dr. Rhodes and Dr. Bekker deal with a risky surgery involving the driver of the car. Also, Dr. Charles' emotions about his ex-wife’s treatments affect his professional opinions.
79	18	"Tell Me the Truth"	Vincent Misiano	Story by : Diane Frolov & Andrew Schneider; Teleplay by : Andrew Schneider & Gabriel L. Feinberg	April 3, 2019	418	7.96
While performing surgery on an elite patient, Dr. Rhodes gets a call from someone claiming that Robin has been kidnapped, demanding a ransom. Meanwhile, Dr. Halstead deals with a patient who is an FBI agent and was the victim of a meth explosion. Dr. Manning and Dr. Choi are at odds when it comes to a teenage patient and parental consent. Also, Sharon deals with budget cuts.
80	19	"Never Let You Go"	Charles S. Carroll	Stephen Hootstein & Joseph Sousa	April 24, 2019	419	7.89
The hospital is put into a situation when a teenager with a gun holds everyone hostage upon learning that his pregnant girlfriend is putting their baby up for adoption and demands to take the baby back. Meanwhile, Dr. Rhodes' father is admitted with heart failure and they both realize time is running out. Also, April performs a procedure on a small child with verbal assistance from Dr. Choi, who was incapacitated by the gunman.
81	20	"More Harm Than Good"	Milena Govich	Story by : Daniel Sinclair; Teleplay by : Eli Talbert & Daniel Sinclair	May 8, 2019	420	7.80
Dr. Charles and Dr. Manning disagree when it comes to a patient who is refusing treatment because she is in a cult. Dr. Halstead tends to a patient whom he suspects is being coerced by his cousin to give him a kidney. Will also has mixed feelings towards Dr. Manning’s new boyfriend. Also, Dr. Choi treats his sister's boyfriend, despite having negative feelings towards him.
82	21	"Forever Hold Your Peace"	Charles S. Carroll	Safura Fadavi & Meridith Friedman	May 15, 2019	421	7.98
Dr. Rhodes treats a patient who broke his arm from a skateboarding accident and is refusing the use of needles for treatment. Dr. Rhodes immediately suspects that the patient's father is a drug addict when the son's screenings come up clean. Also, Dr. Rhodes receives devastating news that his father has died---too late to make amends after learning from the family housekeeper that his father wasn't to blame for his mother's mental illness and death. Meanwhile, April is forced to take care of Dr. Choi’s sister's baby after she abandons him. Dr. Halstead witnesses Maggie's sister being abused by her boyfriend and makes the difficult decision to tell her.
83	22	"With a Brave Heart"	Michael Waxman	Diane Frolov & Andrew Schneider	May 22, 2019	422	7.55
Dr. Halstead and Dr. Manning treat a deaf woman with a heart condition whose husband they had already treated. Meanwhile, Dr. Rhodes finds out that his father died of an insulin overdose and suspects Ava killed him. He also confesses his awareness of the truth in a private moment with his father's corpse. Dr. Choi and April treat a patient who has an allergic reaction to normal things. The woman Maggie donated her kidney to returns to the hospital with cancer. Agent Lee informs Dr. Halstead that one of Ray Burke's sons is out of jail and he may be in danger---and admits to having had feelings for him. In the end, Sharon tells Maggie she has metastatic breast cancer, Dr. Charles gets married, and, while Phillip prepares to propose to Dr. Manning, Agent Lee tells her Dr. Halstead chose to stay in Chicago for her. When Dr. Manning goes to talk with Dr. Halstead, Ray Burke's son rams his car into Dr. Halstead's and she passes out in the latter's arms.

== Production ==
=== Casting ===
Having made her first appearance in the finale of season 3, Heather Headley is set to recur in season 4 as Chicago Med's new COO, Gwen Garrett.

On July 23, 2018, it was announced that Molly Bernard and Colby Lewis would be joining the cast as med students Elsa Curry and Terry McNeal respectively.

After three seasons as Dr. Sarah Reese, Rachel DiPillo left the series during the season premiere of Season 4.

On April 19, 2019, NBC announced that Colin Donnell and Norma Kuhling would depart the series at the end of the season due to creative reasons. Donnell and Kuhling appeared in the season 5 premiere to wrap up their character's storyline.

== Ratings ==
Viewership and ratings per episode of Chicago Med season 4
No.	Title	Air date	Rating/share (18–49)	Viewers (millions)	DVR (18–49)	DVR viewers (millions)	Total (18–49)	Total viewers (millions)
1	"Be My Better Half"	September 26, 2018	1.2/6	7.78	0.7	3.27	1.9	11.06
2	"When to Let Go"	October 3, 2018	1.3/6	8.83	1.1	4.03	2.4	12.86
3	"Heavy Is the Head"	October 10, 2018	1.3/6	8.15	0.6	2.94	1.9	11.08
4	"Backed Against the Wall"	October 17, 2018	1.2/5	7.71	0.7	3.18	1.9	10.91
5	"What You Don’t Know"	October 24, 2018	1.2/5	7.68	0.6	3.01	1.9	10.70
6	"Lesser of Two Evils"	October 31, 2018	1.1/5	7.77	0.7	3.12	1.7	10.90
7	"The Poison Inside Us"	November 7, 2018	1.2/5	8.42	0.7	2.84	1.9	11.26
8	"Play by My Rules"	November 14, 2018	1.2/5	7.53	0.7	3.15	1.9	10.68
9	"Death Do Us Part"	December 5, 2018	1.2/5	7.91	0.6	3.02	1.8	10.98
10	"All the Lonely People"	January 9, 2019	1.3/6	8.54	0.7	2.96	2.0	11.44
11	"Who Can You Trust"	January 16, 2019	1.2/6	8.51	0.6	2.97	1.8	11.48
12	"The Things We Do"	January 23, 2019	1.3/6	9.41	0.6	2.96	2.0	12.38
13	"Ghosts in the Attic"	February 6, 2019	1.4/7	9.37	0.6	2.82	2.0	12.17
14	"Can't Unring That Bell"	February 13, 2019	1.3/6	8.73	0.7	3.11	2.0	11.85
15	"We Hold These Truths"	February 20, 2019	1.3/6	9.11	0.7	3.04	2.0	12.16
16	"Old Flames, New Sparks"	February 27, 2019	1.2/6	8.48	0.7	2.96	1.9	11.45
17	"The Space Between Us"	March 27, 2019	1.2/6	8.08	0.6	2.93	1.8	11.02
18	"Tell Me the Truth"	April 3, 2019	1.0/5	7.96	0.6	2.79	1.7	10.76
19	"Never Let You Go"	April 24, 2019	1.0/5	7.89	0.6	2.77	1.6	10.66
20	"More Harm Than Good"	May 8, 2019	1.0/5	7.80	0.6	2.73	1.6	10.54
21	"Forever Hold Your Peace"	May 15, 2019	1.1/6	7.98	0.6	2.83	1.6	10.81
22	"With a Brave Heart"	May 22, 2019	1.1/5	7.55	0.6	2.89	1.6	10.40

== Home media ==
The DVD release of season four was released in Region 1 on August 27, 2019.

The Complete Fourth Season
Set details			Special features
22 episodes; 997 minutes (Region 1); 6-disc set; 1.78:1 aspect ratio; Languages: English (Dolby Digital 5.1); Subtitles: English (Region 1); French European (Region 1)			Chicago Fire Season 7 Crossover Episode – "Going to War"; Chicago P.D. Season 6 Crossover Episode – "Endings"
Release dates			Chicago Fire Season 7 Crossover Episode – "Going to War"; Chicago P.D. Season 6 Crossover Episode – "Endings"
United States	United Kingdom	Australia	Chicago Fire Season 7 Crossover Episode – "Going to War"; Chicago P.D. Season 6 Crossover Episode – "Endings"
August 27, 2019			Chicago Fire Season 7 Crossover Episode – "Going to War"; Chicago P.D. Season 6 Crossover Episode – "Endings"
