= Chicago Med season 3 =

Chicago Med
- Season 3
- Chicago Med Season 3 DVD cover
- Showrunners: Andrew Schneider; Diane Frolov
- No. of episodes: 20

Release
- Original network: NBC
- Original release: November 21, 2017 – May 15, 2018

Season chronology
- ← Previous; Season 2 Next → Season 4

The third season of Chicago Med, an American medical drama television series with executive producer Dick Wolf, and producers Michael Brandt, Peter Jankowski, Andrew Schneider and René Balcer (uncredited), was ordered on May 10, 2017. The season premiered on November 21, 2017, concluded on May 15, 2018, and contained 20 episodes. This season marks the final regular appearance of main character Sarah Reese, portrayed by Rachel DiPillo.

== Cast ==
=== Main ===
- Nick Gehlfuss as Dr. Will Halstead, Attending Emergency Physician
- Yaya DaCosta as April Sexton, RN
- Torrey DeVitto as Dr. Natalie Manning, Pediatrics/Emergency Medicine Fellow
- Rachel DiPillo as Dr. Sarah Reese, Psychiatry Resident
- Colin Donnell as Dr. Connor Rhodes, Cardiothoracic Surgery Fellow
- Brian Tee as LCDR Dr. Ethan Choi, Attending Emergency Physician
- Marlyne Barrett as Maggie Lockwood, RN, ED Charge Nurse
- Norma Kuhling as Dr. Ava Bekker, Cardiothoracic Surgery Fellow
- S. Epatha Merkerson as Sharon Goodwin, Chief of Services
- Oliver Platt as Dr. Daniel Charles, Chief of Psychiatry

=== Recurring ===
- Ato Essandoh as Dr. Isidore Latham, Chief of Cardiothoracic Surgery
- Roland Buck III as Dr. Noah Sexton, Medical Student
- Mekia Cox as Dr. Robin Charles
- Eddie Jemison as Dr. Stanley Stohl, Chief of Emergency Medicine
- Shay Rose Aljadeff as Dr. Leah Bardovi, Medical Student
- Lorena Diaz as Nurse Doris
- Mia Park as Nurse Beth Cole
- Marc Grapey as Peter Kalmick
- Peter Mark Kendall as Joey Thomas
- Brennan Brown as Dr. Sam Abrams
- Gregory Alan Williams as Bert Goodwin
- D. W. Moffett as Cornelius Rhodes
- Emma Duncan as Dr. Maia Frisch
- James Vincent Meredith as Barry Vaughn
- Arden Cho as Emily
- Michel Gill as Robert Haywood
- Jeremy Shouldis as Dr. Marty Peterson, an anesthesiologist at Gaffney

=== Special guest star ===
- Malcolm McDowell as Dr. Marvin Jaffrey
- Corbin Bleu as Tommy

=== Crossover characters ===
- David Eigenberg as Firefighter Christopher Herrmann
- Kara Kilmer as Paramedic Sylvie Brett
- Philip Winchester as Assistant State's Attorney Peter Stone
- Alex Weisman as Paramedic Chout
- Jesse Lee Soffer as Detective Jay Halstead
- Elias Koteas as Detective Alvin Olinsky
- Joe Minoso as Firefighter Joe Cruz
- Taylor Kinney as Lieutenant Kelly Severide

== Episodes ==
No. overall	No. in season	Title	Directed by	Written by	Original release date	Prod. code	U.S. viewers (millions)
42	1	"Speak Your Truth"	Michael Waxman	Diane Frolov & Andrew Schneider & Stephen Hootstein & Danny Weiss	November 21, 2017	301	6.19
A few months after he was shot outside of the hospital, Dr. Daniel Charles prepares to testify against his shooter. Dr. Robin Charles is released from a rehabilitation facility, but Dr. Rhodes worries about her behavior at home. Dr. Manning returns to work after a sabbatical, where she and Dr. Halstead confront their feelings for one another once and for all. Meanwhile, Dr. Choi and April try to navigate their new relationship while keeping it under wraps at work and Dr. Bekker gets off on the wrong foot with Dr. Rhodes when she poaches one of his patients.
43	2	"Nothing to Fear"	Charles S. Carroll	Jeff Drayer & Joseph Sousa	November 28, 2017	302	7.86
Dr. Rhodes continues to balance his home and work lives and, when a patient of his is re-admitted to the hospital following surgery, Dr. Latham sidelines him from the case. Dr. Manning and Dr. Halstead treat a pregnant woman, but things become complicated when they discover the baby is malnourished and underdeveloped. Dr. Reese and Dr. Daniel Charles continue to disagree regarding patient treatment, leading to one patient slashing Dr. Reese's car tires. Meanwhile, Maggie threatens to separate Dr. Choi and April when they disagree on how best to care for a patient.
44	3	"Trust Your Gut"	Mark Tinker	Eli Talbert & Safura Fadavi	December 5, 2017	303	6.62
Dr. Choi and Dr. Manning are forced into a patient's family drama when they reveal that she is brain dead from a fall and the parents blame their pot smoking son as a bad influence. Dr. Rhodes continues to struggle both with his personal life and in the operating room, causing Dr. Latham to try and reconcile the tension between him and Dr. Bekker. Also, Dr. Charles and Dr. Reese deal with a patient whose apparent psychotic behavior manifests through claims that there is something inside him.
45	4	"Naughty or Nice"	Daisy Von Scherler Mayer	Daniel Sinclair & Danny Weiss	December 12, 2017	304	6.20
Dr. Daniel Charles learns that his shooter was murdered in prison and tries to overcompensate with another patient. Dr. Rhodes and Dr. Bekker perform surgery on a man who, through injury, has his colon and spleen in his chest. Dr. Manning and Dr. Halstead treat a husband and wife, but soon face an ethical dilemma when the husband tests positive for the Zika Virus and doesn't want to tell his wife. Dr. Sexton and April discover that working with family is not always easy when they treat a patient with leptospirosis. Meanwhile, Dr. Robin Charles returns to work and, when a man dressed as Santa Claus passes away in the waiting room, Goodwin goes up against the hospital board when she discovers that Santa's family is being billed $16,000 for medical expenses.
46	5	"Mountains and Molehills"	Michael Waxman	Stephen Hootstein & Meridith Friedman	January 2, 2018	305	6.96
Dr. Choi and Goodwin butt heads over ethics when his patient refuses to take a test for HIV. Meanwhile, Dr. Halstead and Dr. Manning treat a patient who is suffering from sudden paralysis but, later on, Halstead begins to get the same symptoms and fears it might be a contagious disease. Noah deals with his first patient death and Dr. Reese gets increasingly paranoid over hospital security when her car gets vandalized. Dr. Robin Charles starts to exhibit signs of kleptomania.
47	6	"Ties That Bind"	Valerie Weiss	Diane Frolov & Andrew Schneider & Gabriel L. Feinberg	January 9, 2018	306	6.92
Dr. Robin Charles is caught shoplifting in Connor's father's department store. Dr. Choi deals with a frustrated patient with no medical explanation for his condition and asks Dr. Reese for her help. However, her paranoia of unsafe work conditions gets the better of her when she pepper sprays that patient, leading to Dr. Reese getting suspended until further notice---despite the patient attacking her first. Maggie complains to Goodwin about the shortage of nurses in the ED, but then comes up with a plan to boost hospital revenues. Dr. Halstead tends to a patient who is making drastic sacrifices to get pregnant. While treating an elderly mother, Dr. Manning treats the daughter as well for appendicitis, but is confused when she claims to have already had her appendix out. Further tests show that the appendix procedure in her teens was actually to tie her fallopian tubes, a secret her mother kept from her for all these years. Connor returns home, but then seeks out Dr. Daniel Charles to tell him that Robin has gone away.
48	7	"Over Troubled Water"	Leon Ichaso	Jeff Drayer & Jason Cho	January 16, 2018	307	7.88
Dr. Daniel Charles is pressured when Dr. Choi and Dr. Manning disagree with his medical decision regarding a baby born with an addiction to heroin; Dr. Rhodes deals with the fallout following Robin's departure; Goodwin helps her ex-husband Bert understand Lyla's terminal diagnosis.
49	8	"Lemons and Lemonade"	Jono Oliver	Eli Talbert & Paul R. Puri	January 23, 2018	308	6.85
Dr. Choi deals with a patient suffering from anorexia nervosa who refuses treatment. Meanwhile, Dr. Reese returns from her suspension and is immediately put to the test helping a patient with a bipolar disorder. Also, Dr. Halstead treats a cancer patient with no insurance.
50	9	"On Shaky Ground"	Donald Petrie	Joseph Sousa & Danny Weiss	February 6, 2018	309	7.36
Dr. Rhodes and Dr. Bekker are persuaded into performing a risky surgery on Dr. Bekker's mentor while he is still conscious. Meanwhile, Dr. Choi and April suspect their patient is the victim of domestic abuse. Dr. Halstead and Dr. Manning are forced to deliver a premature baby. Also, Dr. Daniel Charles and Dr. Reese visit Cook County jail to give inmates their physicals.
51	10	"Down by Law"	Michael Waxman	Stephen Hootstein & Safura Fadavi	February 27, 2018	310	7.27
Dr. Manning and Maggie's boyfriend, Barry, witness a drive-by shooting and tend to one of the injured gang members. Dr. Manning's life is saved when Barry pulls out and uses a concealed weapon. Consequences arise when Barry's concealed weapons permit is invalid due to a false identity. Meanwhile, Dr. Manning and Dr. Halstead are horrified when they tend to a teenage patient who is pregnant and married to a much older man who refuses treatment for her. Dr. Reese makes a reckless decision with a patient who wants to be on a psychiatric hold because of homicidal thoughts.
52	11	"Folie à Deux"	David Rodriguez	Diane Frolov & Andrew Schneider	March 6, 2018	311	7.03
Dr. Choi and April tend to a stab victim at his apartment and try to figure out if it was intentional or accidental. Meanwhile, Dr. Reese’s estranged father visits Chicago and tries to reconnect. Dr. Manning tends to an infant patient with whooping cough, infected by coming into contact with another child who hadn’t received any of their child vaccinations. Also, Dr. Rhodes and Dr. Bekker's professional relationship is put to the test.
53	12	"Born This Way"	Lin Oeding	Jeff Drayer & Daniel Sinclair	March 20, 2018	312	6.89
Dr. Manning and Dr. Choi travel to a homeless camp to deliver the baby of one of the teenage residents who refuses to deliver at a hospital. Meanwhile, Dr. Halstead and April deal with an uncomfortable situation when they discover that their patient is a pedophile. Dr. Rhodes and Dr. Bekker’s personal and professional relationships clash while treating a patient with a chronic disease.
54	13	"Best Laid Plans"	Fred Berner	Eli Talbert & Meridith Friedman	March 27, 2018	313	5.81
An unconscious patient who cannot be awoken is found in the waiting room, stumping Dr. Choi on what could be the cause. Dr. Halstead and Dr. Manning are at odds when dealing a patient in a vegetative state, thinking that his mother committed assisted suicide, a criminal act in Illinois. Dr. Daniel Charles continues to evaluate the mental state of Dr. Reese’s father as Sarah starts to be manipulated by him. Goodwin has to choose to whom she should give an available heart when both Dr. Rhodes' and Dr. Bekker's patients each require a transplant. Dr. Sexton lets a menopausal patient's age misguide treatment of her symptoms when he ultimately finds out that she is pregnant and goes into labor. Dr. Choi brings his sister to meet April at a Quinceañera.
55	14	"Lock It Down"	Salli Richardson-Whitfield	Diane Frolov & Andrew Schneider & Danny Weiss	April 3, 2018	314	6.19
Goodwin enlists help from Dr. Daniel Charles and Dr. Reese in finding an ailing baby who has been abducted within the hospital, forcing a lockdown. Meanwhile, Dr. Choi asks for Dr. Rhodes' help when he is forced to perform open heart surgery on a patient. Also, Dr. Manning and Dr. Halstead butt heads treating a patient with respiratory issues. Maggie makes a risky decision that could jeopardize her career.
56	15	"Devil in Disguise"	Michael Pressman	Stephen Hootstein & Joseph Sousa	April 10, 2018	315	6.51
Dr. Daniel Charles and Dr. Reese are at odds when trying to diagnose a patient whose mother claims that she is possessed. Meanwhile, Dr. Rhodes and Dr. Bekker have a difference of opinion when trying to save infant conjoined twins. Maggie faces the disciplinary committee following her recent actions. Also, Dr. Choi's sister asks to move in with him.
57	16	"An Inconvenient Truth"	Charles Carroll	Safura Fadavi & Meridith Friedman	April 17, 2018	316	6.31
Dr. Bekker begins to feel the pressure of her job when she accidentally leaves a surgical tool inside of a patient. Meanwhile, Dr. Manning and Dr. Daniel Charles discover that their young patient was born with both male and female reproductive organs. April and Dr. Reese scramble to locate the son of a dying patient. Also, Goodwin’s godson is admitted to the hospital and suspects that he might have committed a crime.
58	17	"The Parent Trap"	Jono Oliver	Jeff Drayer	April 24, 2018	317	6.15
Dr. Reese’s estranged father's health is at risk when his heart begins to give out and Dr. Rhodes is forced to perform emergency surgery. Meanwhile, April and Dr. Sexton suspect that their patient might have accidentally overdosed on fentanyl. Also, Goodwin's job is put at risk when the board begins to question her actions.
59	18	"This Is Now"	Charles Carroll	Eli Talbert & Daniel Sinclair	May 1, 2018	318	5.84
The hospital goes on emergency alert when a mass shooting at a block party sends dozens of victims to the ED. Meanwhile, Dr. Manning gets distracted when her son goes missing. Goodwin asks the board for upgrades to the ED.
60	19	"Crisis of Confidence"	Martha Mitchell	Stephen Hootstein & Danny Weiss	May 8, 2018	319	5.85
Dr. Rhodes faces complications when his patient and her unborn baby die following a heart valve replacement, much to Dr. Bekker's dismay. Meanwhile, Dr. Choi and April believe his younger sister, Emily, is stealing and selling drugs from the hospital. Dr. Daniel Charles begins to suspect that Dr. Reese’s estranged father, Dr. Robert Haywood, is the culprit in a decade-old cold murder case. Dr. Manning treats a young patient with a bad case of flu.
61	20	"The Tipping Point"	Michael Waxman	Diane Frolov & Andrew Schneider	May 15, 2018	320	5.62
Dr. Rhodes second guesses removing himself from the team working to separate conjoined twins; Dr. Choi and April make a startling discovery about his sister; Dr. Daniel Charles uncovers troubling information concerning Dr. Reese's father.

== Production ==
=== Casting ===
After making her debut in the season 2 finale as Dr. Ava Bekker, Norma Kuhling returned in a main role for season 3. Michel Gill appeared in multiple episodes as Bob Haywood, Dr. Reese's (Rachel DiPillo) estranged father, who is admitted to the hospital as a patient. On November 22, it was announced that Arden Cho would be joining the cast in a recurring role as Emily Choi, Ethan's (Brian Tee) adopted sister. Malcolm McDowell guest-stars as Dr. Jaffrey, a distinguished heart surgeon and Dr. Bekker's mentor.

== Ratings ==
Viewership and ratings per episode of Chicago Med season 3
No.	Title	Air date	Rating/share (18–49)	Viewers (millions)	DVR (18–49)	DVR viewers (millions)	Total (18–49)	Total viewers (millions)
1	"Speak Your Truth"	November 21, 2017	1.3/5	6.19	1.0	4.47	2.3	10.66
2	"Nothing to Fear"	November 28, 2017	1.3/5	7.86	0.9	3.82	2.2	11.68
3	"Trust Your Gut"	December 5, 2017	1.2/4	6.62	0.8	3.57	2.0	10.19
4	"Naughty or Nice"	December 12, 2017	1.1/4	6.20	—N/a	—N/a	—N/a	—N/a
5	"Mountains and Molehills"	January 2, 2018	1.5/6	6.96	—N/a	—N/a	—N/a	—N/a
6	"Ties That Bind"	January 9, 2018	1.4/6	6.92	1.0	4.09	2.4	11.01
7	"Over Troubled Water"	January 16, 2018	1.5/6	7.88	0.9	3.67	2.4	11.55
8	"Lemons and Lemonade"	January 23, 2018	1.3/5	6.85	0.9	3.94	2.2	10.80
9	"On Shaky Ground"	February 6, 2018	1.5/6	7.36	0.9	3.95	2.4	11.31
10	"Down by Law"	February 27, 2018	1.4/6	7.27	1.0	4.00	2.4	11.27
11	"Folie à Deux"	March 6, 2018	1.4/5	7.03	0.9	3.92	2.3	10.94
12	"Born This Way"	March 20, 2018	1.2/5	6.89	0.9	3.85	2.1	10.74
13	"Best Laid Plans"	March 27, 2018	1.0/4	5.81	0.9	3.93	1.9	9.74
14	"Lock It Down"	April 3, 2018	1.1/4	6.19	0.9	3.77	2.0	9.95
15	"Devil in Disguise"	April 10, 2018	1.1/5	6.51	1.0	3.93	2.1	10.44
16	"An Inconvenient Truth"	April 17, 2018	1.2/5	6.31	0.8	3.84	2.0	10.14
17	"The Parent Trap"	April 24, 2018	1.0/4	6.15	0.9	3.72	1.9	9.88
18	"This Is Now"	May 1, 2018	1.0/4	5.84	0.8	3.66	1.8	9.50
19	"Crisis of Confidence"	May 8, 2018	1.1/4	5.85	0.8	3.78	1.9	9.63
20	"The Tipping Point"	May 15, 2018	1.0/4	5.62	0.8	3.73	1.8	9.35

== Home media ==
The DVD release of season three was released in Region 1 on August 28, 2018

The Complete Third Season
Set details			Special features
20 episodes; 848 minutes (Region 1); 5-disc set; 1.78:1 aspect ratio; Languages: English (Dolby Digital 5.1); Subtitles: English (Region 1); French (Region 1)			
Release dates
United States	United Kingdom	Australia	
August 28, 2018			
