= Chicago Med season 5 =

Chicago Med
- Season 5
- Chicago Med Season 5 DVD cover before the departures of Colin Donnell and Norma Kuhling
- Showrunners: Andrew Schneider; Diane Frolov
- No. of episodes: 20

Release
- Original network: NBC
- Original release: September 25, 2019 – April 15, 2020

Season chronology
- ← Previous; Season 4 Next → Season 6

The fifth season of Chicago Med, an American medical drama television series with executive producer Dick Wolf, and producers Michael Brandt, Peter Jankowski, Andrew Schneider and René Balcer (uncredited), was ordered on February 26, 2019. This season marks the last appearances of Norma Kuhling as Dr. Ava Bekker, and Colin Donnell as Dr. Connor Rhodes, as well as the first appearance of Dominic Rains as Dr. Crockett Marcel. The season premiered on September 25, 2019.

On March 13, 2020, the production of the fifth season was suspended due to the COVID-19 pandemic.

This season also includes the series' 100th episode.

== Cast ==
=== Main characters ===
- Nick Gehlfuss as Dr. Will Halstead, Supervising Attending Emergency Physician
- Yaya DaCosta as Emergency Department Nurse April Sexton
- Torrey DeVitto as Dr. Natalie Manning, Emergency Medicine/Pediatrics Attending
- Colin Donnell as Dr. Connor Rhodes, Attending Trauma Surgeon (episode 1)
- Brian Tee as LCDR Dr. Ethan Choi, Attending Emergency Physician
- Marlyne Barrett as Maggie Lockwood, RN, ED Charge Nurse
- Norma Kuhling as Dr. Ava Bekker, Cardiothoracic Surgery Attending (episode 1)
- S. Epatha Merkerson as Sharon Goodwin, Chief of Services
- Oliver Platt as Dr. Daniel Charles, Chief of Psychiatry
- Dominic Rains as Dr. Crockett Marcel, Trauma Surgeon (episode 2 onwards; guest, episode 1)

=== Recurring characters ===
- Brennan Brown as Dr. Sam Abrams, Attending Neurosurgeon
- Ato Essandoh as Dr. Isidore Latham, Cardiothoracic Surgeon
- Molly Bernard as Elsa Curry, fourth-year medical student
- Nate Santana as Dr. James Lanik, Chief of Trauma
- Roland Buck III as Dr. Noah Sexton, resident
- Casey Tutton as ED Nurse Monique Lawson
- Lorena Diaz as ED Nurse Doris
- Marie Tredway as ED Nurse Trinidad “Trini” Campos
- Mia Park as Operating Room Nurse Beth Cole
- Marc Grapey as Peter Kalmick, Head of Gaffney's Legal Department
- Heather Headley as Gwen Garrett, Gaffney's Chief Operating Officer
- Paula Newsome as Caroline "Cece" Charles
- Ian Harding as Phillip Davis
- Charles Malik Whitfield as Ben Campbell
- Hannah Alligood (credited as Hannah Riley) as Anna Charles, teenage daughter of Daniel and Susan Charles
- Jill Abramovitz as Susan Charles, Daniel Charles' third ex-wife
- Gregory Alan Williams as Bert Goodwin, Sharon's ex-husband
- Hampton Fluker as Michael Goodwin, Sharon and Bert's son, a pharmaceutical rep
- Jessy Schram as Dr. Hannah Asher, Obstetrics and Gynecology
- Jeremy Shouldis as Dr. Marty Peterson, an anesthesiologist at Gaffney

=== Guest characters ===
- Adam Petchel as Tim Burke (episode 1)
- Mekia Cox as Robin Charles (episode 9)

=== Crossover guest stars ===
- LaRoyce Hawkins as Officer Kevin Atwater
- Jesse Spencer as Captain Matthew Casey
- Randy Flagler as Firefighter Harold Capp
- Anthony Ferraris as Firefighter Tony Ferraris
- Tracy Spiridakos as Detective Hailey Upton
- Jason Beghe as Sergeant Hank Voight
- Taylor Kinney as Lieutenant Kelly Severide
- Kara Killmer as Paramedic in Charge Sylvie Brett
- David Eigenberg as Lieutenant Christopher Hermann
- Annie Ilonzeh as Paramedic Emily Foster
- Eamonn Walker as Battalion Chief Wallace Boden
- Jesse Lee Soffer as Detective Jay Halstead
- Patrick John Flueger as Officer Adam Ruzek
- Marina Squerciati as Officer Kim Burgess
- Lisseth Chavez as Officer Vanessa Rojas
- Amy Morton as Desk Sergeant Trudy Platt

== Episodes ==
No. overall	No. in season	Title	Directed by	Written by	Original release date	Prod. code	U.S. viewers (millions)
84	1	"Never Going Back to Normal"	Michael Pressman	Diane Frolov & Andrew Schneider	September 25, 2019	501	7.53
Following the car accident, Dr. Manning suffers a traumatic head injury and Dr. Halstead blames himself. Trauma surgeon Dr. Crockett Marcel and Dr. Halstead are suspicious of Phillip when he claims he and Dr. Manning are engaged and tries to order Dr. Halstead away from her care and life. Dr. Rhodes believes Dr. Bekker caused his father's death, but the administration seems to suspect Dr. Rhodes. When they learn the insulin overdose contains traceable amounts of chromium, Dr. Bekker takes her own life, but not before confessing to Rhodes. Meanwhile, Dr. Choi and April deal with a pregnancy scare while treating a young patient who may be going blind and Maggie confronts her cancer diagnosis. Dr. Charles cuts his honeymoon short to treat a patient with potential schizophrenia. Unable to get over what happened, Dr. Rhodes resigns and leaves Chicago after saying goodbye to Goodwin and Dr. Latham, who admits he's accepted Dr. Rhodes as a friend.: This episode marks the final appearances of Dr. Connor Rhodes (Colin Donnell) and Dr. Ava Bekker (Norma Kuhling) and the first appearance of Dr. Crockett Marcel (Dominic Rains).
85	2	"We're Lost in the Dark"	Alex Chapple	Jeff Drayer	October 2, 2019	502	7.67
During a stormy night in Chicago, the power goes out at Gaffney and chaos ensues. Dr. Marcel and Dr. Sexton are forced to perform surgery in the dark. Dr. Manning gets trapped in an elevator with a patient who needs emergency surgery. Dr. Choi trains a new set of residents while Dr. Halstead, Maggie, and Sharon tend to a series of students who are having multiple seizures and suspect it might be an outbreak.
86	3	"In the Valley of the Shadows"	Charles S. Carroll	Stephen Hootstein	October 9, 2019	503	7.47
April and Dr. Marcel get off to a rocky start when tending to a patient who performed her own childbirth. Dr. Choi deals with a patient who has terminal cancer trying to deliberately end his own life. Dr. Manning treats a patient with second degree burns. Maggie trains a new nurse whose near-constant referencing of her credentials unnerves Maggie. Also, after falling and fracturing her wrist at home, Dr. Charles' wife Caroline wants surgery to repair it.
87	4	"Infection: Part II"	Michael Pressman	Teleplay by : Diane Frolov & Andrew Schneider; Story by : Dick Wolf & Derek Haas	October 16, 2019	504	8.93
Panic and terror continues to ravage Chicago as more victims die from a deadly flesh-eating bacteria outbreak. The Chicago Police Department’s Intelligence unit investigates and suspects the outbreak might be an act of terrorism, as it is only affecting two hugely populated places in the city. Meanwhile, Sharon deals with the press and fumes when her complete remarks aren't included in stories. The episode ends with Dr. Halstead catching one of the University researchers destroying evidence, thus making the researcher the prime suspect, especially after knocking Dr. Halstead out with a heavy lab instrument. The second part of a three-part episode that begins on Chicago Fire and concludes on Chicago P.D.
88	5	"Got a Friend in Me"	John Polson	Eli Talbert	October 23, 2019	505	7.84
Dr. Marcel and Dr. Choi don’t see eye to eye when treating a patient with chronic pain, with Dr. Marcel recommending surgery. Dr. Manning is forced to take a drastic measure when treating a child patient whose parents do not believe in Western medicine. Dr. Halstead tends to a patient who is dealing with shortness of breath. Meanwhile, Maggie continues her chemotherapy treatment, but contemplates revealing her diagnosis to the staff.
89	6	"It's All in the Family"	Nicole Rubio	Safura Fadavi & Meridith Friedman	October 30, 2019	506	7.95
April and Dr. Sexton stumble upon an assault in progress in an alley. They take the victim to get checked out and discover that she was about to be initiated into a gang. Also, Dr. Manning continues to struggle to find a diagnosis for a young patient after consecutive misdiagnoses and comes to a crossroads in her relationships with both Phillip and Dr. Halstead. Dr. Marcel reveals his suspicions of Phillip to Dr. Halstead. Meanwhile, Dr. Choi and Dr. Charles tend to a patient who is transitioning. Also, Sharon reconsiders reuniting with her ex-husband Bert.
90	7	"Who Knows What Tomorrow Brings"	Jerry Levine	Daniel Sinclair & Paul R. Puri	November 6, 2019	507	8.09
Dr. Halstead and Dr. Charles deal with a patient who believes that he is a vampire. Dr. Manning and Elsa Curry deal with a patient with respiratory issues. Dr. Choi's treatment of a military amputee is blocked when a group of military officers escorts his patient back to base. Meanwhile, Maggie meets a man while at chemotherapy and also hosts a crawfish party along with Dr. Marcel. Also, April and Ethan discuss having children in their future.
91	8	"Too Close to the Sun"	Michael Berry	Joseph Sousa & Danny Weiss	November 13, 2019	508	7.43
Maggie makes an unethical decision when she discovers that her new friend Ben has contracted measles. Meanwhile, Dr. Choi and Dr. Charles deal with a patient who is a social media influencer using his followers to make medical decisions on his behalf. Also, Dr. Halstead treats a patient with a new kidney, but discovers that it is failing her and she might have to go back on both the transplant list and dialysis. Also, Dr. Marcel operates on April's brother, Dr. Sexton, after he is violently assaulted.
92	9	"I Can’t Imagine the Future"	Charles S. Carroll	Diane Frolov & Andrew Schneider	November 20, 2019	509	8.43
As Dr. Manning treats Phillip's daughter, who he has abandoned, she begins to regain her memory of the night of the accident with Dr. Halstead and realizes she made a mistake, especially after the baby's relatives declare Phillip to be a far less than truthful man. Meanwhile, April receives news that she has a low chance of conceiving a child naturally, putting her relationship with Ethan at risk. Maggie is hopeful when her boyfriend Ben's health begins to improve. Also, Dr. Charles continues to care for his wife CeCe as her health deteriorates.
93	10	"Guess It Doesn't Matter Anymore"	Mykelti Williamson	Stephen Hootstein & Gabriel L. Feinberg	January 8, 2020	510	7.46
April deals with the fallout from her kiss with Dr. Marcel and considers telling Ethan. However, she gets surprising news from Ethan himself. Meanwhile, Dr. Halstead tends to a patient he dealt with in the past who now suffers from a drug problem. Dr. Manning treats a child of one of Dr. Halstead's patients. Dr. Curry tries to use an unorthodox phone app when treating a patient with panic attacks. Also, Dr. Charles mourns the loss of his wife CeCe.
94	11	"The Ground Shifts Beneath Us"	Martha Mitchell	Safura Fadavi & Meridith Friedman	January 15, 2020	511	8.45
The team at Gaffney Medical Center is put on high alert when a plane crashes at O'Hare Airport with one of their own, Dr. Abrams, listed as one of the victims. As Dr. Marcel and Dr. Choi tend to the unidentifiable patient's treatment, Abrams' wife shows up and immediately wants to pull the plug. Meanwhile, Dr. Manning finds a baby alone in a freezing car and later discovers that the child belongs to the COO, who is going through a divorce. Dr. Sexton and April tend to a patient who gave birth to a baby which, test results show, is not her biological child. Also, Dr. Halstead and Dr. Charles try to spearhead a safe injection site within the hospital.
95	12	"Leave the Choice to Solomon"	Milena Govich	Jeff Drayer	January 22, 2020	512	8.44
Dr. Marcel and Dr. Manning make difficult decisions when two children are impaled by rebar at a school bus accident. Meanwhile, Dr. Halstead's side project begins to take a toll on his position when Dr. Charles gets involved. Also, Maggie treats an old friend.
96	13	"Pain Is for the Living"	Vincent Misiano	Eli Talbert	February 5, 2020	513	8.66
April, Dr. Choi, and Dr. Charles try to put the pieces together when a child is brought to the ED by his parents with severe bruising on the hands. Meanwhile, Dr. Manning grows suspicious of a mother who shows no emotion when her child is diagnosed with an intestinal condition. Also, Dr. Halstead is shocked to discover that one of his addicts is a doctor in the ED.
97	14	"It May Not Be Forever"	Elodie Keene	Daniel Sinclair & Paul R. Puri	February 12, 2020	514	8.17
Dr. Manning and Dr. Marcel disagree over a patient involved in a domestic dispute. Dr. Charles and Dr. Curry step into the treatment of another doctor's patient, who is in a vegetative state, when they suspect that he may have been misdiagnosed. Dr. Halstead’s involvement at a safe injection site comes to a standstill. Also, Dr. Choi and April treat a patient who is allergic to her husband's semen.
98	15	"I Will Do No Harm"	Vanessa Parise	Joseph Sousa & Danny Weiss	February 26, 2020	515	8.61
Dr. Manning and Dr. Charles deal with a patient who is an actor pretending to be the father of a child at the mother's behest. They soon discover that the patient is intentionally poisoning himself as a part of his act. Dr. Choi and Dr. Marcel have differences when dealing with a prisoner patient on death row. Dr. Halstead grows worrisome about Hannah’s intent to give up opioids. Also, April and Dr. Sexton race against the clock, treating a patient who must keep running to sustain an elevated heart rate.
99	16	"Who Should Be the Judge"	Alex Chapple	Safura Fadavi	March 4, 2020	516	8.31
Dr. Marcel and Dr. Manning are kidnapped at gunpoint and forced into a van to help mend an escaped convict's broken leg. Meanwhile, Dr. Charles and Dr. Halstead are on opposite sides when dealing with a teenage patient exhibiting signs of schizophrenia. Dr. Choi and April discover the truth about a patient's scam. Dr. Halstead deals with the fallout from turning in Hannah. Also, Maggie receives news that she is in remission.
100	17	"The Ghosts of the Past"	Michael Waxman	Diane Frolov & Andrew Schneider	March 18, 2020	517	9.17
Dr. Manning and Dr. Charles tend to a child patient and suspect that the mother might be abusing her to get attention. After his daughter is suspended for vaping, Dr. Charles is forced to bring his daughter to the hospital. Meanwhile, after April begins to exhibit major stomach pains, Dr. Halstead recommends returning Dr. Asher. April reveals to Ethan that she kissed Crockett and Ethan and Marcel come to blows. Also, Maggie plans her wedding.
101	18	"In the Name of Love"	S. J. Main Muñoz	Meridith Friedman	March 25, 2020	518	9.60
Sharon and Dr. Charles fear that Dr. Halstead is reverting to old habits when he begins to mistreat a patient with early onset Alzheimer's. Meanwhile, Maggie and Ben are worried about one of Ben's students when they discover that he hasn't been receiving treatment for his stomach. Dr. Manning and Dr. Marcel disagree over a patient regarding a difficult surgery. Also, April and Ethan's relationship begins to deteriorate following the fallout of April's confession.
102	19	"Just a River in Egypt"	Jean de Segonzac	Jeff Drayer	April 8, 2020	519	9.07
Dr. Charles and Dr. Choi tend to a patient who fell off an overpass and Dr. Charles suspects that he might be suicidal, not a suspect in an investigation. Dr. Choi is forced to cross paths with Dr. Marcel and his patient, who is the key witness for the incident. Meanwhile, Dr. Halstead and Dr. Asher's relationship is put to the test when dealing with a pregnant patient who had brain cancer. Also, Maggie tries to cut through red tape in getting treatment for Ben's student. Meanwhile, things escalate as Dr. Choi punches Dr. Marcel and breaks up with April, leaving her devastated.
103	20	"A Needle in the Heart"	Milena Govich	Stephen Hootstein & Daniel Sinclair	April 15, 2020	520	9.33
Dr. Marcel’s past comes to Chicago when two detectives from New Orleans issue a warrant for his arrest in connection to a cold murder case. Meanwhile, Dr. Halstead discovers that his patient is using a false identity to receive medical treatment after he has a life threatening allergic reaction. Dr. Choi puts his life in danger to treat a child with a gunshot wound. Also, while his daughter volunteers at the hospital, Dr. Charles deals with a patient who is intentionally stabbing himself with needles.

== Production ==
On April 19, 2019, NBC announced that Colin Donnell (Dr. Connor Rhodes) and Norma Kuhling (Dr. Ava Bekker) would be departing the series due to creative reasons, but they would both appear in the season 5 premiere to wrap up their characters' storyline. The episode sees Connor depart Med after Ava kills herself in front of him. Series showrunners Andy Schneider and Diane Frolov said the scene in which Dr. Bekker takes her own life was the "ultimate revenge against the man that had rejected her." Her death pushes Connor to leave Med, as he will always be reminded of everything that happened. Schneider and Frolov confirmed that the ending means Donnell could return to the show in the future.

The season premiere also begins several ongoing storylines for the show's regulars. Dr. Natalie Manning (Torrey DeVitto) will be dealing with a traumatic brain injury she sustained in the season 4 finale. A time gap occurs between the first and second episodes, in which Dr. Manning recovers and returns to work. Schneider and Frolov said the injury would prompt questions about Dr. Manning's ability to do her job well. They also confirmed that Dr. Manning's memory will return and the audience will find out what she was planning on telling Dr. Halstead before the crash.

Following a pregnancy scare for Dr. Choi (Brian Tee) and Nurse April Sexton (Yaya DaCosta) in the first episode, the idea of having a child is "definitely part of their storyline." Meanwhile, Maggie Lockwood (Marlyne Barrett) is diagnosed with breast cancer and her treatment is a long-running storyline, which showcases new technology available to cancer patients. Frolov commented, "We hope women will see Maggie and relate to her, especially when she goes through the biopsy. Maybe they'll see her go through it and realize it's not as terrible as you'd imagine in your head — it's painless. That's what we were hopeful for, that seeing someone go through it will help reduce fear."

Dominic Rains joined the cast in the recurring role of Dr. Crockett Marcel, "a hard-partying doctor from Louisiana". He made his first appearance in the season premiere.

=== Crossover ===
In early September 2019, Chicago Fire showrunner Derek Haas confirmed a crossover event between Fire, Chicago Med and Chicago P.D.. Haas and producer Dick Wolf came up with the story, and Haas would write all three episodes, marking the first time he had written for Med since the spin-off episode "I Am the Apocalypse". Haas explained that the shows would be "intertwined" and there would be scenes that would make viewers think they are watching "a Med scene, but it's in the Fire hour." The plot revolves around "a mysterious illness", with Haas comparing it to The Poseidon Adventure or Independence Day, saying "where you've got a bunch of stories – cutting to one, cutting to another – and there's a mystery, both medical and criminal, going on that we’re trying to solve before it gets out of hand." The crossover begins in Fire's fourth episode, before leading into Med and P.D. on the same day.

== Ratings ==
Viewership and ratings per episode of Chicago Med season 5
No.	Title	Air date	Rating/share (18–49)	Viewers (millions)	DVR (18–49)	DVR viewers (millions)	Total (18–49)	Total viewers (millions)
1	"Never Going Back to Normal"	September 25, 2019	1.0/5	7.53	0.7	3.45	1.7	10.99
2	"We're Lost in the Dark"	October 2, 2019	1.1/5	7.67	0.6	2.85	1.6	10.53
3	"In the Valley of the Shadows"	October 9, 2019	1.1/5	7.47	0.6	2.95	1.7	10.43
4	"Infection: Part II"	October 16, 2019	1.5/7	8.93	0.7	3.52	2.1	12.47
5	"Got a Friend in Me"	October 23, 2019	1.2/6	7.84	0.5	2.97	1.7	10.81
6	"It's All in the Family"	October 30, 2019	1.2/6	7.95	0.5	2.86	1.7	10.82
7	"Who Knows What Tomorrow Brings"	November 6, 2019	1.1/5	8.09	0.5	2.99	1.6	11.09
8	"Too Close to the Sun"	November 13, 2019	1.1/5	7.43	0.5	2.91	1.5	10.35
9	"I Can’t Imagine the Future"	November 20, 2019	1.2/6	8.43	0.4	2.67	1.6	11.11
10	"Guess It Doesn't Matter Anymore"	January 8, 2020	1.1/6	7.46	0.6	2.89	1.7	10.35
11	"The Ground Shifts Beneath Us"	January 15, 2020	1.2/6	8.45	0.5	2.86	1.7	11.32
12	"Leave the Choice to Solomon"	January 22, 2020	1.1/5	8.44	0.6	3.05	1.7	11.46
13	"Pain Is for the Living"	February 5, 2020	1.1	8.66	0.5	2.76	1.7	11.42
14	"It May Not Be Forever"	February 12, 2020	1.1	8.17	0.5	2.88	1.6	11.05
15	"I Will Do No Harm"	February 26, 2020	1.2	8.61	0.5	2.69	1.6	11.31
16	"Who Should Be the Judge"	March 4, 2020	1.0	8.31	0.5	2.62	1.6	10.95
17	"The Ghosts of the Past"	March 18, 2020	1.3	9.17	0.6	2.79	1.9	11.98
18	"In the Name of Love"	March 25, 2020	1.4	9.60	0.5	2.54	1.9	12.15
19	"Just a River in Egypt"	April 8, 2020	1.2	9.07	0.6	2.78	1.8	11.83
20	"A Needle in the Heart"	April 15, 2020	1.1	9.33	0.5	2.56	1.7	11.90
