= Chicago Med season 6 =

Chicago Med
- Season 6
- Chicago Med Season 6 DVD cover
- Showrunners: Andrew Schneider; Diane Frolov
- No. of episodes: 16

Release
- Original network: NBC
- Original release: November 11, 2020 – May 26, 2021

Season chronology
- ← Previous; Season 5 Next → Season 7

The sixth season of Chicago Med, an American medical drama television series with executive producer Dick Wolf, and producers Michael Brandt, Derek Haas, Peter Jankowski, Andrew Schneider and Diane Frolov, was ordered on February 27, 2020. The season premiered on November 11, 2020. Storylines reflected the impact of the COVID-19 virus and marked the final main series appearance of ED nurse April Sexton (portrayed by Yaya DaCosta).

== Cast ==
=== Main characters ===
- Nick Gehlfuss as Dr. Will Halstead, Supervising Attending Emergency Physician
- Yaya DaCosta as Emergency Department Nurse April Sexton
- Torrey DeVitto as Dr. Natalie Manning, Emergency Medicine/Pediatrics Attending
- Brian Tee as LCDR Dr. Ethan Choi, Attending Emergency Physician/Chief of the ED.
- Marlyne Barrett as Maggie Campbell, RN, ED Charge Nurse
- S. Epatha Merkerson as Sharon Goodwin, Chief of Patient and Medical Services
- Oliver Platt as Dr. Daniel Charles, Chief of Psychiatry
- Dominic Rains as Dr. Crockett Marcel, Trauma surgeon

=== Recurring characters ===
- Tehmina Sunny as Dr. Sabeena Virani, R&D Rep from Kender Pharmaceutical
- Jodi Kingsley as DCFS Officer Madeline Gastern
- Margaret Colin as Carol Conte, Natalie's mother
- Steven Weber as Dr. Dean Archer
- Nate Santana as Dr. James Lanik
- Hannah Alligood as Anna Charles, teenage daughter of Daniel and Susan Charles
- Jill Abramovitz as Susan Charles, Daniel Charles' third ex-wife
- Brennan Brown as Dr. Samuel Abrams, Attending Neurosurgery
- Hampton Fluker as Michael Goodwin, Sharon's son, a pharmaceutical rep
- Charlie Farrell as Mark Barragan
- Benny Mora as Mike
- Charles Malik Whitfield as Ben Campbell, Maggie's fiancé
- Christopher Farrar as Auggie Roberts, Maggie and Ben's foster son
- Lorena Diaz as ED Nurse Doris
- Marie Tredway as ED Nurse Trinidad “Trini” Campos
- Gregory Alan Williams as Bert Goodwin, Sharon's ex-husband
- Asjha Cooper as Vanessa Taylor, a med student who is Maggie's biological daughter
- Marc Grapey as Peter Kalmick, head of Gaffney's legal dept.
- Jeremy Shouldis as Dr. Marty Peterson, an anesthesiologist at Gaffney

=== Guest characters ===
- Jessy Schram as Dr. Hannah Asher, Obstetrics and Gynecology (episode 1)
- Roland Buck III as Dr. Noah Sexton, resident (episode 5)
- Ato Essandoh as Dr. Isidore Latham, Chief of Cardiothoracic Surgery (episode 16)

=== Crossover guest stars ===
- LaRoyce Hawkins as Officer Kevin Atwater
- Kara Killmer as Paramedic in Charge Sylvie Brett
- Joe Minoso as Firefighter Joe Cruz
- Hanako Greensmith as Paramedic Violet Mikami

== Episodes ==
No. overall	No. in season	Title	Directed by	Written by	Original release date	Prod. code	U.S. viewers (millions)
104	1	"When Did We Begin to Change?"	Michael Pressman	Diane Frolov & Andrew Schneider	November 11, 2020	601	7.83
As the COVID-19 virus continues to spread throughout the world, the first responders begin to adjust to a new normal at Gaffney. Meanwhile, Dr. Halstead has his hands full when treating a patient with an injured arm who constantly falls and begins to suspect that she might be an alcoholic, while also dealing with his girlfriend Hannah's newest relapse. Dr. Marcel and Dr. Manning treat a patient whose cancer has returned. April and Dr. Choi are put in charge of the COVID-19 unit and deal with the latest patient to die from the virus. Elsewhere, Dr. Charles is forced to quarantine after contracting COVID-19 and Sharon must work from home due to her health.
105	2	"Those Things Hidden in Plain Sight"	John Polson	Stephen Hootstein & Daniel Sinclair	November 18, 2020	602	7.87
When Sharon announces that Dr. Choi has been chosen as the new Chief of the ED, Dr. Halstead lets his resentment get the better of him. Later, a young girl is admitted with breathing problems and her mom is admitted after contracting COVID. Meanwhile, Dr. Manning treats a pregnant patient who has been convicted of an assault and gets annoyed when the patient's parole officer starts to intervene. Dr. Charles and Dr. Marcel bond over therapy. Also, Dr. Charles deals with family drama.
106	3	"Do You Know the Way Home?"	Mykelti Williamson	Jeff Drayer & Gabriel L. Feinberg	January 13, 2021 (Note: This episode was originally scheduled to air on January 6, 2021, in the United States and Canada. In the United States it was preempted as a result of the January 6 United States Capitol attack, however the episode still partially aired on its originally scheduled air date for Canada's east coast on CityTV before being switched for a re-run of episode 2.)	603	7.62
Dr. Charles, Dr. Choi, and April tend to a young patient who they suspect was abducted at a young age. Meanwhile, Maggie and Dr. Halstead treat an elderly patient with heart problems whose daughter, his caretaker, begins to intervene. Dr. Marcel deals with an ex from his past as a patient. While taking FaceTime calls from patients, Dr. Manning begins to suspect that one of the callers is afraid of going to hospitals during the pandemic. Also, April and Dr. Choi butt heads when he requests she come back down to the ED from the COVID unit.
107	4	"In Search of Forgiveness, Not Permission"	Milena Govich	Eli Talbert & Paul R. Puri	January 27, 2021 (Note: This episode was originally scheduled to air on January 13, 2021, in the United States and Canada, but was replaced in the United States by "Do You Know the Way Home?", which was postponed from the previous Wednesday.)	604	7.20
Sharon returns to work following her quarantine from COVID-19. Meanwhile, Dr. Choi meets a doctor who performed multiple surgeries to make his body perfect and consults with Dr. Charles. Dr. Marcel and Dr. Manning put their careers in jeopardy when they treat a patient who was undiagnosed with cancer and are confronted by Sharon. Later, Dr. Choi snaps at Dr. Charles and slams his hand in the bathroom napkin dispenser. Dr. Halstead struggles to get donors for a clinical trial and finds an unlikely helper in April. Dr. Manning tends to Maggie's friend Auggie and continues to flirt with Dr. Marcel.
108	5	"When Your Heart Rules Your Head"	Mykelti Williamson	Safura Fadavi & Meridith Friedman	February 3, 2021 (Note: This episode was originally scheduled to air on January 20, 2021, in the United States and Canada, but was preempted in the United States for news coverage of the inauguration of Joe Biden.)	605	7.48
Dr. Choi is put into an impossible situation when April's brother, Noah, assists one of his very depressed patients and the patient is undecided whether to commit suicide. Dr. Choi is unsure whether he should turn Noah in or lie to authorities. Meanwhile, Dr. Halstead does everything to keep his trial going. Dr. Charles continues to fight for custody of his daughter so she does not have to move to Arizona. Dr. Charles' daughter Anna requests help from Dr. Manning. Also, Dr. Manning and Dr. Marcel talk about their romantic encounter.
109	6	"Don't Want to Face This Now"	Milena Govich	Melissa R. Byer & Treena Hancock	February 10, 2021	606	7.29
Dr. Marcel and Dr. Manning deal with a patient who was undiagnosed with a cancerous tumor. Later on, Dr. Marcel makes it personal when the patient decides to give up on life. Dr. Choi and April treat a patient who has extremely bad pain in his jaw. Meanwhile, Maggie runs out of options when it comes to finding a liver transplant for her foster son. After discovering a pregnancy pamphlet, Dr. Charles confronts his daughter Anna about her actions. Also, Dr. Halstead considers a career decision.
110	7	"Better Is the Enemy of Good"	Charles S. Carroll	Diane Frolov & Andrew Schneider	February 17, 2021	607	7.59
Dr. Halstead searches for answers as one of his patients from his clinical trial begins to have complications. Dr. Marcel and Dr. Manning diagnose a patient with an aggressive cancer disguised as pneumonia. Dr. Choi is admitted to the hospital after having surgery to remove his gallbladder. Dr. Charles tends to a doctor who begins experiencing a possible psychotic breakdown. Sharon and her son Michael argue about surgery protocols after Dr. Abrams scolds him for upselling during a procedure. Also, Maggie learns that Auggie has an older brother living in California and his adoptive parents want to meet him.
111	8	"Fathers and Mothers, Daughters and Sons"	John Polson	Safura Fadavi & Meridith Friedman	March 10, 2021	608	7.57
Dr. Marcel treats Dr. Manning's mother after she is rushed to the hospital with heart failure. Things get heated when Dr. Halstead intervenes during her course of treatment. Dr. Choi hires his old navy mentor to join the ED. He begins to start giving orders to Dr. Choi, which annoys April. Meanwhile, Dr. Charles deals with a patient who suffers from a delusion that her deceased baby is still alive in a doll and also deals with his daughter officially moving to Arizona. Later, his wife makes the decision to let Anna stay in Chicago. Maggie receives news that Auggie's brother's adoptive parents want to adopt Auggie.
112	9	"For the Want of A Nail"	S. J. Main Muñoz	Stephen Hootstein & Daniel Sinclair	March 17, 2021	609	7.09
Dr. Charles deals with a patient who accidentally injected a nail into her foot. Maggie bonds with a young woman who is taken to Chicago Med for an emergency. Dr. Archer calls out Drs. Manning and Marcel about their relationship and they try to balance the relationship while working in the Emergency Department.
113	10	"So Many Things We've Kept Buried"	Martha Mitchell	Jeff Drayer & Paul R. Puri	March 31, 2021	610	7.24
After treating a patient in the field, April goes the extra mile to see the patient's course of treatment through at the hospital. Meanwhile, Dr. Choi and Dr. Halstead have a disagreement when dealing with a pregnant patient with irregular heartbeats. Also, Dr. Marcel performs a difficult surgery when a piece of metal that could cause serious complications is lodged in a patient's chest.
114	11	"Letting Go Only to Come Together"	S. J. Main Muñoz	Eli Talbert & Gabriel L. Feinberg	April 7, 2021	611	6.88
April is chosen to work in a COVID unit at Chicago Med, but her actions with a patient bring dire consequences. Meanwhile, Dr. Charles treats a man with a brain tumor who has a seizure while being treated. Also, Dr. Marcel leaves a lasting impression on Dr. Manning's mother, and Drs. Choi and Varani tend to a young athlete with a heart condition who wants to participate in the U.S. Open.
115	12	"Some Things Are Worth the Risk"	Carl Weathers	Melissa R. Byer & Treena Hancock	April 21, 2021	612	7.15
After receiving poor news from her mother Carol's heart testing results, Dr. Manning takes matters into her own hands in order to keep her mother alive. Meanwhile, Dr. Charles tends to a previous patient who has been harming herself with poison. Dr. Choi notices Dr. Archer is beginning to experience PTSD while on a field call. Also, Dr. Halstead comes clean with Dr. Virani about his actions during the clinical trial.
116	13	"What A Tangled Web We Weave"	Bethany Rooney	Teleplay by : Safura Fadavi & Meridith Friedman; Story by : Safura Fadavi & Ryan Michael Johnson	May 5, 2021 (Note: This episode was originally scheduled to air on April 28, 2021, in the United States and Canada, but was replaced in the United States by a rerun of "Fathers and Mothers, Daughters and Sons", due to President Joe Biden's presidential address to the joint session of Congress.)	613	7.09
Sharon spirals into a panic when she gets into a car accident involving a young child riding his bike at night. Things take a turn for the worse when the child needs brain surgery. Meanwhile, Dr. Manning grows worried when Dr. Halstead goes around searching for missing narcotics from his trial that she swiped to help her mother. Maggie contemplates meeting her long lost daughter. Also, April is put into an uncomfortable situation when Dr. Archer asks her to take over performing a procedure.
117	14	"A Red Pill, a Blue Pill"	Michael Berry	Stephen Hootstein & Daniel Sinclair	May 12, 2021	614	7.06
Dr. Manning's mother is rushed to the hospital when her health begins to rapidly decline. Dr. Halstead begins to suspect that Dr. Manning is responsible for the missing trial medication. Meanwhile, April grows worried about Dr. Archer because she thinks that he might have given an overdose to a patient when he refused treatment due to his political beliefs. Also, Maggie is shocked to discover that her daughter is one of the new student doctors at Gaffney.
118	15	"Stories, Secrets, Half-Truths and Lies"	Michael Waxman	Jeff Drayer	May 19, 2021	615	6.62
Dr. Manning's mother is rushed to the hospital again after new complications arise. Dr. Manning and Dr. Halstead become desperate for answers after it is discovered that she will need a heart transplant. Meanwhile, Dr. Archer and Dr. Choi tend to a patient with a brain condition who refuses treatment. Dr. Charles is put into a stressful situation when a previous patient tries to harm herself after being refused attention from him. Also, Maggie meets her daughter's adoptive parents.
119	16	"I Will Come to Save You"	Michael Pressman	Diane Frolov & Andrew Schneider	May 26, 2021	616	7.26
Carol receives a second chance at life when a new heart becomes available. Dr. Choi and Dr. Archer find themselves in hot water with an old patient. Dr. Halstead faces the consequences of the stolen trial medication.

== Production ==
=== Filming ===
After shutting down in early March due to COVID-19, production on the new season picked up on Sept. 22. NBC revealed on September 29, 2020, that the series took a two-week hiatus after a crew member tested positive for COVID-19. The positive result was discovered during rapid testing and the unnamed individual was immediately sent home. The temporary shutdown did not affect Med's Season 6 premiere or the production schedules for Chicago Fire and Chicago P.D..

=== Casting ===
On September 22, 2020, Tehmina Sunny has been tapped for a multi-episode arc. On May 12, 2021, it was announced that longtime cast members Yaya DaCosta and Torrey DeVitto would depart the series at the end of the sixth season opting not to renew their contracts and instead pursue new work opportunities. DeVitto appeared in the season 7 premiere to wrap up her character's storyline.

== Ratings ==
Viewership and ratings per episode of Chicago Med season 6
No.	Title	Air date	Rating (18–49)	Viewers (millions)	DVR (18–49)	DVR viewers (millions)	Total (18–49)	Total viewers (millions)
1	"When Did We Begin to Change?"	November 11, 2020	1.2	7.83	0.5	2.77	1.7	10.60
2	"Those Things Hidden In Plain Sight"	November 18, 2020	1.0	7.87	0.5	2.51	1.5	10.38
3	"Do You Know the Way Home"	January 13, 2021	1.0	7.62	0.4	2.14	1.4	9.76
4	"In Search of Forgiveness, Not Permission"	January 27, 2021	0.9	7.20	—N/a	—N/a	—N/a	—N/a
5	"When Your Heart Rules Your Head"	February 3, 2021	1.0	7.48	—N/a	—N/a	—N/a	—N/a
6	"Don't Want to Face This Now"	February 10, 2021	1.0	7.29	0.5	2.59	1.4	9.88
7	"Better Is the Enemy of Good"	February 17, 2021	0.9	7.59	0.4	2.34	1.4	9.93
8	"Fathers and Mothers, Daughters and Sons"	March 10, 2021	1.0	7.57	0.4	2.42	1.5	10.00
9	"For the Want of A Nail"	March 17, 2021	0.8	7.09	—N/a	—N/a	—N/a	—N/a
10	"So Many Things We've Kept Buried"	March 31, 2021	0.9	7.24	—N/a	—N/a	—N/a	—N/a
11	"Letting Go Only to Come Together"	April 7, 2021	0.8	6.88	0.5	2.56	1.3	9.44
12	"Some Things Are Worth the Risk"	April 21, 2021	0.9	7.15	—N/a	—N/a	—N/a	—N/a
13	"What A Tangled Web We Weave"	May 5, 2021	0.9	7.09	0.5	2.50	1.4	9.59
14	"A Red Pill, a Blue Pill"	May 12, 2021	0.9	7.06	0.4	2.28	1.3	9.34
15	"Stories, Secrets, Half-Truths and Lies"	May 19, 2021	0.8	6.62	0.3	2.25	1.1	8.87
16	"I Will Come to Save You"	May 26, 2021	0.8	7.26	0.5	2.30	1.3	9.56
