= Matthew Casey =

Fictional character

- Chicago Fire character
- First appearance: Chicago Fire: Pilot (episode 1.01)
- Last appearance: Chicago Fire: Port in the Storm (episode 12.06)
- Created by: Matt Olmstead
- Portrayed by: Jesse Spencer

In-universe information
- Full name: Matthew Casey
- Nickname: Matt
- Gender: Male
- Titles: Lieutenant season 1–6; Captain season 6–10
- Occupation: CFD Firefighter, Contractor (off-duty), Alderman (formerly)
- Family: Nancy Annalyn Casey (mother); Gregory Alan Casey (father; deceased); Christie Casey (sister); Violet Jordan (niece)
- Spouses: Gabriela Dawson (m. 2016; div. 2018) Sylvie Brett (m. 2024)
- Significant others: Hallie Thomas (former fiancée; deceased)
- Children: Unborn child (miscarriage); Julia Brett-Casey (adoptive daughter); Griffin Darden (guardian); Ben Darden (guardian); Louie Thompson (former foster son); Bria Jamison (former temporary guardian)
- Relatives: Jim Jordan (former brother-in-law); Antonio Dawson (former brother-in-law)
- Nationality: American
- Date of birth: March 24, 1979
- Hometown: Chicago, Illinois
- Residence: Portland, Oregon; Chicago, Illinois (formerly)

Career
- Department: Chicago Fire Department; Portland Fire Department
- Years of service: 2003–present
- Badge No.: 17138

Matthew "Matt" Casey is a fictional character on the NBC drama Chicago Fire, portrayed by actor Jesse Spencer. Casey is a firefighter at Firehouse 51. He was a lieutenant from seasons 1 to 6, and from season 6 is a captain in the Chicago Fire Department on Truck Company 81.

The character had an ongoing feud with Detective Hank Voight (Jason Beghe), a protagonist in Chicago Fire spin-off Chicago P.D. Casey's storyline crosses with Voight's once again in the season 3 finale of Chicago Fire, after he reluctantly agrees to help Voight with an undercover investigation.

== Background and characterization ==
As the leader of the truck company, Casey's cool, standoffish demeanor and no-nonsense attitude sometimes put his crew off, but they respect him, and Chief Boden highly regards him. He is extremely private about his personal life, preferring to wallow in his own problems rather than seek help from his colleagues. He sometimes comes across as distant and aloof, as he usually keeps to himself during downtime, even when around colleagues in the lounge room. In the season 4 premiere, Herrmann tellingly says the way Casey deals with something is by avoiding it. Of all the characters, he typically confides in Severide or Dawson, and only after he reaches his breaking point. Despite this, Casey does care for his crew and will not hesitate to defend them, even if it means standing up to his superiors and risking his own career.

He trusts his truck company implicitly and is generally quite lax with them in good faith they will maintain professional standards themselves, only disciplining them when he has no choice. However, he is known for being tough with candidates, as seen with Mills, Jones, and Borrelli, and would either personally or have one of his more senior firefighters regularly drill them.

Casey is the son and youngest child of Gregory and Nancy Casey and has an older sister, Christie. He is burdened by his ex-convict mother, Nancy, who shattered the family 15 years earlier when she murdered his abusive father. He and his older sister grew distant with each other after their father's death, but they have since mended their relationship. His family still remains a touchy subject, and, according to veterans Mouch and Herrmann, there is an unspoken rule within the firehouse about no one mentioning Casey's family or asking about them.

His relationship with Gabriela Dawson was a major storyline throughout the series, and they eventually married in the 100th episode. Their relationship ended when Dawson left Chicago to head a rescue-and-relief unit in Puerto Rico at the end of season 6. Eventually, they divorced.

After Dawson's departure, Casey gradually grew closer to her former partner, paramedic in charge Sylvie Brett, throughout seasons 7 to 9. Eventually, they fell in love and finally consummated their relationship in the season 9 finale. In season 10, Casey moves to Oregon to take care of Andrew Darden's sons, becoming their legal guardian, but maintains a long-distance relationship with Brett. In the season 11 finale, Casey returns to Chicago and proposes to Brett. They officially married in season 12.

A skilled handyman and carpenter, Casey freelances as a construction contractor when off-duty. Other characters have consulted him for advice on construction-related issues. For example, he was "consulted" by Herrmann on renovation works and building code compliance for Molly's, and built a ramp for a paraplegic accident victim he and his men had rescued.

== Character arc ==
=== Chicago Fire ===
In the series premiere, Casey and Kelly Severide are shown to be good friends since their days at the fire academy and longtime coworkers who are at loggerheads with each other, much to Chief Boden's frustration, due to the death of fellow firefighter and close friend Andy Darden. Although they try to remain professional in front of their men, their spats often make their way into the firehouse off-duty to the point where they indirectly insult each other, with candidate Peter Mills getting caught in the crossfire. They eventually put aside their animosity by the end of the first season. Throughout the series, they are often seen putting themselves in danger to assist each other during dangerous calls. Both are known to their men as intensely guarded and reticent about their personal lives, but they confide in each other, usually over a beer or sharing a cigar on the firehouse roof.

Darden's death affects Casey in the following episodes because he is forced to look after Darden's two young sons when Darden's widow, Heather, is imprisoned for DUI manslaughter. He discovers he was named their legal guardian in the Dardens' will, and their time together helps him develop a strong relationship with the boys. The fact Heather still keeps in contact with Casey is a sore point for him and Severide as she blames Severide for failing to prevent her husband's death.

Casey is engaged to Dr. Hallie Thomas for a time, but she tells him she never wants to have children, and they decide to break it off. He tentatively pursues Gabby Dawson, but they end up staying friends. At the end of the first season, Hallie returns, and Casey rekindles his relationship with her. After discovering a drug ring in a clinic where she works, she ends up being murdered. Despite Casey and Severide's efforts to rescue her from the fire set at her clinic, Casey is informed of Hallie's death by a doctor, and weeps in Mills’ arms. At the end of season 1 and the prelude into season 2, Gabby shows up at his door, helping him cope with Hallie's death. She has long had a crush on him, but on a casual date at her cousin's Christmas party, he kissed her on the cheek when she tried to kiss him, and from then on, Dawson seems mad at him. In season 2, he shows up at Gabby's door and kisses her. At the start of the next episode, they are shown waking up in bed together. Later on, Casey risks his life to save a baby in a burning building and is rushed to the hospital in critical condition. When he gets back on the job, he suffers from neurological symptoms such as memory loss, uncharacteristic outbursts of anger, and headaches, but keeps this from his colleagues, although his erratic behavior is quickly picked up by several veteran coworkers and Dawson. When he begins to bleed from his ear, he sees a doctor who tells him it was caused by a crack in his skull and warns him that another hit to the head could be catastrophic. He decides not to tell his colleagues or the Chief, fearing he would be forced into disability retirement.

After Mills breaks up with Dawson, she and Casey begin spending time together, partially because Casey has to look after Heather's children and asks for help. After spending more time together, Casey and Dawson decide they are happy just being friends. Casey eventually gets help from Dawson's friend, Isabella, to get Heather moved to a minimum security facility so she can see Griffin and Ben more often. Heather eventually gets released due to overcrowding and moves to Florida since she can't live in Chicago without being reminded of death. This deeply saddens Casey, but he understands. Later on, Casey and Dawson wake up in bed together. Dawson still has doubts about Casey's ability to commit, but he assures her he can. They then start a relationship. He proposes to her in the season 2 finale, but before he can get an answer, the bells go off, and they head to a call where Shay is killed. This puts off his plans for a while, but months later, Casey proposes to Dawson again at the Fire academy, and she happily accepts. The two then go home. However, their happiness is short-lived because Dawson joins Truck 81. As colleagues, they cannot get married. Following Shay's death, Severide moves in with Casey and Dawson. Some of the strain on Casey and Dawson's relationship comes from his and Severide's friendship. This, among other things, leads Dawson to break up with Casey. Later on, Severide turns down an order from his chief to spy on Casey. Severide is the only person on the show, besides Dawson and Chief Boden, to call Casey by his first name.

In season 3, Casey knowingly turns down Voight's help with a case of human trafficking involving the owner of a strip club, Jack Nesbitt. Nesbitt is a former firefighter and friend. Casey initially takes on construction as a favor, but senses something is not right about some of Nesbitt's business associates. He eventually agrees to help Voight get intel about Nesbitt. In the season 3 finale, he is discovered missing when Dawson goes to his house to check on him. She finds his apartment trashed and the dead body of a stripper named Katya, who had worked for Nesbitt. Casey is nowhere to be found, presumably kidnapped.

Katya is revealed to have been compiling a notebook of evidence with the intention of exposing the trafficking ring running out of Nesbitt's nightclub. She went to Casey's house to ask for help, but they were ambushed by Bulgarian criminals who killed Katya on the spot. For the first several episodes, Casey is seen struggling to come to terms with Nesbitt's betrayal and having to witness a murder in his own home. His inner turmoil is somewhat lessened when Dawson, who is temporarily on desk duty at the Office of Fire Investigation, reveals her pregnancy to him. They didn't intend to let the secret leave the firehouse. However, word eventually spreads to their colleagues just before Dawson suffers a miscarriage.

Casey's relationship with Dawson became strained when they disagreed over her decision to foster Louie, a boy they had rescued who had no listed next of kin. He comes to accept Louie, much to Dawson's delight. They push for an adoption, but a judge tells them their chances are slim due to their committed relationship lacking evidence. He and Dawson get married and file for the adoption together. However, Louie's biological father files for custody, having just learned about his existence after returning from a deployment in Afghanistan. He succeeds after being backed by his immediate family members. In the season 5 finale, Casey's life is left hanging in the balance when he is trapped in a warehouse fire alongside many others. His fate is not revealed, and he delivers what looks like a goodbye speech to Gabby, unsure if he will be able to get out.

In the season 6 premiere, Boden makes the call to open up the water cannon, ordering the men to take cover any way they can. Casey is seen taking cover using a metal cabinet, as well as shielding a victim. When Boden finds Casey, he is passed out under the cabinet with his PASS alarm going off. The episode jumps two months later, where the firehouse looks to be at a memorial to his life. They are in dress blues for this, but it turns out Casey receives a medal of valor after the fire, and he, along with the rest of Firehouse 51, returns to normal lives.

He is recommended for promotion to Captain after rescuing a suicidal mentally unstable person from jumping off a building. After rescuing Dawson from the collapsed parking garage, he is promoted. Uniformed personnel claps for him and Dawson, and the two hug. He later snaps at Dawson's father and then gets into it with her. He also has come to blows with Severide after they decide how to get a patient down who is trapped on top of a building.

After Sylvie Brett's friend from Indiana, Hope, forges a signature from a fire chief, Matt and Chief Boden dismiss her from the fire station. Casey and Dawson are awarded temporary foster guardianship of Bria Jamison, a runaway teen who has an addict father and family members who want nothing to do with her. In the middle of a warehouse fire, Casey and Severide jump off the roof as it explodes. He and Severide jump into the river fully clothed. While Casey swims and heads to the surface, Severide is injured, and Kidd has to rescue him. Casey is then comforted by Gabby, and Severide recovers.

Casey helps Gabby get Bria ready for prom. He decides they should have something good to remember, so he lets Bria and her date ride in a firetruck. After the truck leaves, Gabby tells Matt she wants to start trying again, which he agrees to. However, after going to a doctor and finding out Gabby has a small chance of dying if she gets pregnant, he decides he doesn't even want to try. He brings up adoption and looks into it, which makes Gabby upset since she's afraid the same thing will happen that did with Louie. After an argument, Gabby tells Matt she'll be right back and goes to ask about a job in Puerto Rico. Gabby later comes back from Puerto Rico only to leave once and for all. While fighting an apartment fire, Brett expresses blame to Casey for letting Gabby go. However, he assures her no one could have prevented it.

Casey later reveals his and Dawson's divorce to Severide. He starts dating a reporter named Naomi, but she soon tells him her career is taking her to Zurich. He is surprised but happy since she helped him deal with the departure of his ex-wife.

Brett helps Casey look for an apartment to live in following the fire that destroyed his old apartment. She finds what appears to be a perfect apartment, but Casey decides to move in with Severide following his breakup with Stella Kidd. While on a call dealing with a suicide attempt, he is ambushed by a gunman who has killed his brother. As he deals with his post-traumatic stress stemming from the event, he takes it out on Herrmann when Ritter gets injured on a call.

While on the scene of a call, Casey is hit by an uncooperative drunk driver, and he fears his career at the fire department may be over. Casey goes to get an MRI as a result of his head injury, and Brett comes with him. He says the results could mean he might have to quit the CFD. Luckily, the MRI shows no damage to his brain. Both Brett and Casey are happy to hear he is cleared to return to full duty. They share a long and passionate hug.

Casey finally confesses his true feelings to Brett and tells her he loves her. They consummated their relationship in the season 9 finale.

In season 10, Casey moves to Oregon to take care of Andrew Darden's sons. In addition, he has applied to the Portland Fire Department.

In the season 10 finale, Casey came back to Chicago for Kelly and Stella's wedding.

In the season 11 finale, Casey returns to Chicago and proposes to Sylvie. They officially get married in season 12, and Sylvie permanently moves to Oregon to live with him, their adopted daughter Julia, and the Darden boys.

=== Relationships ===
Hallie Thomas

In season 1, he is engaged to Dr. Hallie Thomas, but they end it when she tells him she doesn't want to have kids. Later on, they resume the relationship. However, at the end of season 1, Hallie dies in a fire at the clinic where she works.

Gabriela Dawson

His relationship with Dawson starts at the end of season 1 after the death of Hallie. Their relationship goes up and down. At the end of season 3, Dawson reveals she is pregnant. However, she loses her child as a result of an ectopic pregnancy at the beginning of season 4. In season 5, they marry in order to successfully adopt Louie, something that doesn't come to fruition after his biological father returns.

At the end of season 6, Dawson goes to Puerto Rico to help a relief unit, leaving their marriage behind. She returns once more in the following episode, but tells Casey she will be moving there. She later briefly returns to Chicago for a charity event.

Sylvie Brett

After Dawson's departure, Matt grew close to her partner, Sylvie. They had been there for each other during tough times. After a friend mentioned Sylvie should be with Matt, she was initially confused by her feelings for him, especially since she was close to his ex-wife. However, she got engaged to her ex-boyfriend before Matt could ask her out.

In season 8, Sylvie is still confused by her feelings for Matt, getting defensive when he assumes she is going on a date. However, Matt helps her get through a difficult time in the aftermath of her birth mother's death, shortly after they had reconnected, and she faced the possibility of raising her new baby half-sister on her own.

In season 9, Matt's feelings for Brett become more apparent when he offers to stay at Sylvie's place after she suspects an OD patient's violent brother might be out for revenge, and her ambulance is run off the road. Matt jumped out of the truck without it stopping. This culminates with a kiss, but Brett stops before it progresses any further. While the two try to move on from the kiss, Matt struggles to get over her, and she begins dating another truck lieutenant at another firehouse. However, when an old head injury threatens Casey's career, Brett is there for him, though it causes her boyfriend to break up with her. After Severide encouraged him, Casey told Brett about his real feelings and, after a period of awkwardness between them, she admitted the same. Soon, after they consummated their relationship.

In season 10, Casey moves to Oregon to take care of Andrew Darden's sons, becoming their legal guardian, but he and Sylvie still love each other, and they agree to continue dating each other, with their relationship turning into a long-distance one.

In the season 11 premiere, Sylvie broke up with Casey due to them having grown apart. In the season 11 finale, Casey proposes to Sylvie in the doorway of her apartment. They officially married in season 12, and he became the adoptive father of Sylvie's adopted daughter, whom they named Julia Brett-Casey. After their wedding, Sylvie permanently moves to Oregon to live with Casey, Julia, and the Darden boys.

=== Crossover appearances ===
Casey has appeared on Chicago P.D., mainly in cross-overs. Although he is on friendly terms with most characters, he has a notable grudge against Hank Voight since he was a victim of Voight's cover as a corrupt cop running with local gangs and was made livid by Voight's cover-up of his son's DUI. The animosity has since faded somewhat due to Voight saving him from being shot by Jack Nesbitt in the nick of time and assisting Boden in several arson-related investigations. Matt even showed sympathy for Voight after the loss of his son.

- Chicago P.D.: "8:30 PM" (April 30, 2014)
- Chicago P.D.: "The Number of Rats (April 29, 2015)
- Chicago P.D.: "The Silos" (September 21, 2016)
- Chicago P.D.: "Don't Bury This Case" (January 3, 2017)
- Chicago Med: "Cold Front" (February 16, 2017)
- Chicago P.D.: "Profiles" (March 7, 2018)
- Chicago Med: "When to Let Go" (October 3, 2018)
- Chicago P.D.: "Good Men" (February 20, 2019)
- Chicago Med: "The Space Between Us" (March 27, 2019)
- Chicago Med: "We're Lost in the Dark" (October 2, 2019)
