= Chicago P.D. season 6 =

Chicago P.D.
- Season 6
- Chicago P.D. Season 6 DVD cover
- Showrunner: Rick Eid
- No. of episodes: 22

Release
- Original network: NBC
- Original release: September 26, 2018 – May 22, 2019

Season chronology
- ← Previous; Season 5 Next → Season 7

The sixth season of Chicago P.D., an American police drama television series with executive producer Dick Wolf, and producers Derek Haas, Michael Brandt, and Rick Eid, was ordered on May 9, 2018. The season premiered on September 26, 2018. The season concluded on May 22, 2019, and contained 22 episodes. This is the last season where Jon Seda plays Antonio Dawson.

== Cast ==
=== Regular ===
- Jason Beghe as Sergeant Henry "Hank" Voight
- Jon Seda as Detective Antonio Dawson
- Jesse Lee Soffer as Detective Jay Halstead
- Tracy Spiridakos as Detective Hailey Upton
- Patrick John Flueger as Officer Adam Ruzek
- Marina Squerciati as Officer Kim Burgess
- LaRoyce Hawkins as Officer Kevin Atwater
- Amy Morton as Desk Sergeant Trudy Platt

=== Recurring ===
- Anne Heche as Deputy Superintendent Katherine Brennan
- John C. McGinley as Superintendent Brian Kelton
- Wendell Pierce as Alderman Ray Price
- Charles Michael Davis as Blair Williams

=== Special guest star ===
- Rob Morrow as Evan Gilchrist

=== Crossover characters ===
- Jesse Spencer as Captain Matthew Casey
- Taylor Kinney as Lieutenant Kelly Severide
- Kara Killmer as Paramedic in Charge Sylvie Brett
- David Eigenberg as Lieutenant Christopher Herrmann
- Joe Minoso as Firefighter Joe Cruz
- Eamonn Walker as Chief Wallace Boden
- Annie Ilonzeh as Paramedic Emily Foster
- Nick Gehlfuss as Dr. Will Halstead
- Brian Tee as LCDR Dr. Ethan Choi
- S. Epatha Merkerson as Sharon Goodwin

== Episodes ==
| No. overall | No. in season | Title | Directed by | Written by | Original release date | Prod. code | U.S. viewers (millions) |
|---|---|---|---|---|---|---|---|
| 107 | 1 | "New Normal" | Eriq La Salle | Rick Eid | September 26, 2018 | 601 | 7.14 |
The Intelligence unit deals with the aftermath of Olinsky's death. Voight is put on suspension due to shooting the suspect for Olinsky’s murder in cold blood. The Intelligence unit investigates a series of heroin overdoses. Ruzek butts heads with Dawson when the latter is put in charge of the Unit. The Unit attends Olinsky's funeral, with Voight watching at a distance.
| 108 | 2 | "Endings" | David Rodriguez | Gwen Sigan | October 3, 2018 | 602 | 7.78 |
One of the patients at Chicago Med goes missing following a 25-story apartment building fire. The Intelligence unit discovers that the patient extracted an RFID chip from her body related to a trafficking ring. Halstead mourns the loss of his father and is told to stay off of the case. This episode concludes a crossover with Chicago Fire and Chicago Med that begins on "Going to War" and continues on "When to Let Go". It is included on the Chicago Fire Season 7 and Chicago Med Season 4 DVD sets.
| 109 | 3 | "Bad Boys" | Nick Gomez | Timothy J. Sexton | October 10, 2018 | 603 | 7.16 |
The Intelligence unit investigates the kidnapping of a teenage girl from a wealthy family by a professional robbery gang. They discover that the kidnapping was staged and that the girl is in a relationship with one of the robbers. Voight and Platt work to get Olinsky exonerated. Ruzek and Upton hook up.
| 110 | 4 | "Ride Along" | Nicole Rubio | Gavin Harris | October 17, 2018 | 604 | 6.95 |
Burgess is asked to take a civilian girl who wants to become a police officer on a ride-along. The ride-along goes sideways when they get caught in crossfire and the girl disappears. Burgess is forced to omit a crucial fact when it comes time to go to the review board. Antonio gets hooked on oxycodone.
| 111 | 5 | "Fathers and Sons" | Eriq La Salle | Jeffrey Nachmanoff | October 24, 2018 | 605 | 6.64 |
The Intelligence unit investigates a drug-dealing ring after the brutal death of a young drug mule. Ruzek decides to go undercover and is shocked to find his own father involved.
| 112 | 6 | "True or False" | Paul McCrane | Story by : Rick Eid & Gavin Harris; Teleplay by : Rick Eid | October 31, 2018 | 606 | 6.95 |
The Intelligence unit investigates the brutal beating and death of an alderman’s wife, leading to Upton opening up about her childhood. Upton and Ruzek continue to try to keep their relationship a secret.
| 113 | 7 | "Trigger" | Carl Seaton | Todd Robinson | November 7, 2018 | 607 | 6.84 |
The Intelligence unit investigates a series of bombings that involve a local Islamic mosque. Atwater goes undercover to find evidence. Things become tense for Halstead when the investigation brings back memories of his Afghanistan service. The FBI and Voight make a deal to work the investigation together.
| 114 | 8 | "Black and Blue" | Christine Swanson | Kim Rome | November 14, 2018 | 608 | 6.00 |
The Intelligence unit looks into taking down a drug kingpin. Things escalate quickly when Atwater discovers that his girlfriend might be involved. Dawson’s addiction continues to get worse.
| 115 | 9 | "Descent" | Nicole Rubio | Rick Eid & Timothy J. Sexton | December 5, 2018 | 609 | 6.82 |
Dawson’s addiction to pain killers takes a dramatic turn when he gets involved with a drug dealer. Voight gets wind of Dawson’s problem and tries to help him out. Dawson’s daughter is kidnapped and the Intelligence unit does everything in their power to find her. Dawson attacks the kidnapper, leading to his death.
| 116 | 10 | "Brotherhood" | Mykelti Williamson | Gwen Sigan | January 9, 2019 | 610 | 6.86 |
Following Dawson’s actions, Voight plans to cover up his misdeeds and send Dawson to rehab but Ruzek feels a sense of loyalty to Voight and Intelligence and takes the blame. Intelligence is called in when a wave of recent carjackings suddenly turns deadly. Voight, Platt, and Upton try to find a way out for Ruzek.
| 117 | 11 | "Trust" | Lily Mariye | Gavin Harris | January 16, 2019 | 611 | 7.26 |
The Intelligence unit investigates the murder of a well known defense attorney. Voight suspects that the police superintendent, who is running for Mayor of Chicago, might be involved in local gangs. Meanwhile, Dawson returns to work following his rehab stint.
| 118 | 12 | "Outrage" | Vincent Misiano | Story by : Timothy J. Sexton & April Fitsimmons; Teleplay by : Timothy J. Sexton | January 23, 2019 | 612 | 7.22 |
When the intelligence Unit goes undercover to take down a heroin operation, Halstead gets recognized by a criminal he has history with. Halstead believes he may be a person of interest in an unsolved murder case. When Ruzek and Burgess go undercover to take him down, plans go south and the criminal turns up dead and Halstead may be implicated.
| 119 | 13 | "Night in Chicago" | Eriq La Salle | Rick Eid & Ike Smith | February 6, 2019 | 613 | 7.38 |
When Atwater goes undercover to stop a criminal enterprise, he and his partner are stopped by police and his partner is shot and killed, forcing Atwater to decide where his allegiance lies. The situation escalates to a number of protests about police using excessive force.
| 120 | 14 | "Ties That Bind" | Paul McCrane | Kim Rome & Katherine Visconti | February 13, 2019 | 614 | 7.49 |
The Intelligence Unit travel to a Wisconsin gun show to take down a supplier who’s manufacturing “cop killer” machine guns made to be untraceable and is identified by a spiderweb tattoo on his hand. However, while undercover trying to take down the criminals, Burgess and Upton get kidnapped at gunpoint, which leads to the case becoming personal for the unit. But when the serial numbers for the guns leads to a different manufacturer, Voight comes to the conclusion the suppliers they're looking for are actually con artists and were planning to kidnap Burgess from the start, leading to a race against time to save her and Upton. Meanwhile, Burgess discovers that Upton and Ruzek are dating, leading to tension between the two women.
| 121 | 15 | "Good Men" | Donald Petrie | Gwen Sigan | February 20, 2019 | 615 | 8.91 |
When Joe Cruz returns from his undercover stint at Firehouse 66 to reveal the firefighter behind the missing lockbox key is Calvin Suggs, Voight and the Intelligence Unit make Suggs a person of interest as they continue their investigation into the spree of burglaries plaguing the city, all while playing the investigation by the book without tarnishing reputations. However, their investigation turns into murder when Suggs is killed. A teenage suspect later confesses to acting alone and to have stolen the key, but Jay becomes convinced that he's covering for someone much more dangerous. This episode concludes a crossover with Chicago Fire that began on "What I Saw." It is included on the Chicago Fire Season 7 DVD set.
| 122 | 16 | "The Forgotten" | Eriq La Salle | Gavin Harris | February 27, 2019 | 616 | 7.15 |
After taking down another case for the Intelligence unit, one of Voight’s CIs goes missing. They continue to investigate when they discover that she has been kidnapped by a notorious serial killer. Alderman Price tries to persuade Voight to get into politics.
| 123 | 17 | "Pain Killer" | Nicole Rubio | Timothy J. Sexton | March 27, 2019 | 617 | 7.01 |
Chaos engulfs Chicago when a sniper shooter is targeting members of law enforcement and government employees. Voight digs deeper and discovers that the suspect was involved in one of Voight's former cases and a CI.
| 124 | 18 | "This City" | Carl Seaton | Rick Eid & Gwen Sigan | April 3, 2019 | 618 | 6.86 |
Voight and Ray Price team up to come up with a peace offering to respond to the rise of gang violence after a mother of two is caught in crossfire. Meanwhile, Burgess grows suspicious about her new boyfriend.
| 125 | 19 | "What Could Have Been" | Eriq La Salle | Rick Eid & Gwen Sigan | April 24, 2019 | 619 | 6.99 |
The Intelligence unit investigates the murder of Burgess’s boyfriend Blair. Voight suspects Blair might have been involved in a violent drug crossfire and Burgess tries to prove his theory wrong. Later on, there is new evidence that the homicide might be connected to potential new Chicago Mayor Ray Price.
| 126 | 20 | "Sacrifice" | John Hyams | Gavin Harris | May 8, 2019 | 620 | 6.29 |
The Intelligence unit investigates a series of pharmaceutical robberies. One of the criminals involved is stealing because his wife is sick. Meanwhile, Ruzek and Upton’s romantic relationship interferes with the case which leads to Platt giving Upton some advice.
| 127 | 21 | "Confession" | Carl Seaton | Timothy J. Sexton | May 15, 2019 | 621 | 6.73 |
The Intelligence unit tries to take down a drug dealer. While investigating, Dawson shares a connection with the case and begins to have a guilty conscience from a previous case. Voight does everything in his power to get evidence against Kelton.
| 128 | 22 | "Reckoning" | Eriq La Salle | Rick Eid & Gwen Sigan | May 22, 2019 | 622 | 6.59 |
The Intelligence unit tries to dig up evidence to stop Kelton becoming Mayor of Chicago and disbanding Intelligence. Complications arise when Voight tries to track down one of Kelton’s drug dealing confidants who might be the key to take him down and he turns up murdered. Meanwhile, evidence becomes clear from Internal Affairs that Ruzek has been lying and trying to cover up for Dawson’s actions. Voight confronts Ruzek on this, and tells him he's not like Al and shouldn't try to be, but Ruzek denies this was his intention and storms off. Later on, Ruzek sticks with his word and is arrested for the crime. Finally, Voight tells Halstead that he is going to see Kelton and do what needs to be done. Kelton is found shot dead, and Voight drives away from the scene.: This episode marks the final appearance of Detective Antonio Dawson (Jon Seda).

== Production ==
=== Cast changes ===
On April 19, 2019, NBC announced that Jon Seda would again depart the series at the end of the sixth season due to creative reasons.

== Ratings ==
Viewership and ratings per episode of Chicago P.D. season 6
| No. | Title | Air date | Rating/share (18–49) | Viewers (millions) | DVR (18–49) | DVR viewers (millions) | Total (18–49) | Total viewers (millions) |
|---|---|---|---|---|---|---|---|---|
| 1 | "New Normal" | September 26, 2018 | 1.2/6 | 7.14 | 1.0 | 4.06 | 2.2 | 11.21 |
| 2 | "Endings" | October 3, 2018 | 1.2/5 | 7.78 | 1.2 | 4.36 | 2.4 | 12.14 |
| 3 | "Bad Boys" | October 10, 2018 | 1.2/5 | 7.16 | 0.9 | 3.91 | 2.1 | 11.07 |
| 4 | "Ride Along" | October 17, 2018 | 1.1/5 | 6.95 | 0.9 | 3.83 | 2.1 | 10.79 |
| 5 | "Fathers and Sons" | October 24, 2018 | 1.2/5 | 6.64 | 0.9 | 3.94 | 2.1 | 10.59 |
| 6 | "True or False" | October 31, 2018 | 1.1/5 | 6.95 | 0.9 | 4.04 | 2.0 | 10.99 |
| 7 | "Trigger" | November 7, 2018 | 1.1/5 | 6.84 | 1.0 | 4.11 | 2.1 | 10.95 |
| 8 | "Black and Blue" | November 14, 2018 | 1.0/5 | 6.00 | 1.0 | 4.02 | 2.0 | 10.02 |
| 9 | "Descent" | December 5, 2018 | 1.1/5 | 6.82 | 0.9 | 3.93 | 2.0 | 10.75 |
| 10 | "Brotherhood" | January 9, 2019 | 1.0/5 | 6.86 | 1.0 | 4.26 | 2.1 | 11.12 |
| 11 | "Trust" | January 16, 2019 | 1.1/5 | 7.26 | 0.9 | 4.06 | 2.0 | 11.32 |
| 12 | "Outrage" | January 23, 2019 | 1.1/5 | 7.22 | 1.0 | 4.33 | 2.1 | 11.56 |
| 13 | "Night in Chicago" | February 6, 2019 | 1.2/6 | 7.38 | 1.0 | 4.18 | 2.1 | 11.55 |
| 14 | "Ties That Bind" | February 13, 2019 | 1.1/5 | 7.49 | 0.9 | 4.00 | 2.0 | 11.54 |
| 15 | "Good Men" | February 20, 2019 | 1.4/6 | 8.91 | 1.1 | 4.46 | 2.5 | 13.39 |
| 16 | "The Forgotten" | February 27, 2019 | 1.1/5 | 7.15 | 1.0 | 4.21 | 2.2 | 11.36 |
| 17 | "Pain Killer" | March 27, 2019 | 1.1/5 | 7.01 | 1.1 | 4.45 | 2.1 | 11.46 |
| 18 | "This City" | April 3, 2019 | 1.0/5 | 6.86 | 0.9 | 3.86 | 1.9 | 10.73 |
| 19 | "What Could Have Been" | April 24, 2019 | 1.0/5 | 6.99 | 0.9 | 4.08 | 2.0 | 11.08 |
| 20 | "Sacrifice" | May 8, 2019 | 0.9/4 | 6.29 | 0.8 | 3.60 | 1.6 | 9.89 |
| 21 | "Confession" | May 15, 2019 | 1.0/5 | 6.73 | 0.9 | 4.08 | 1.9 | 10.81 |
| 22 | "Reckoning" | May 22, 2019 | 1.0/5 | 6.59 | 0.9 | 4.14 | 1.8 | 10.64 |

== Home media ==
The DVD release of season six was released in Region 1 on September 10, 2019.

The Complete Sixth Season
| Set details | | | Special features |
| 22 episodes; 1,043 minutes (Region 1); 6-disc set; 1.78:1 aspect ratio; Languages: English (Dolby Digital 5.1); Subtitles: English (Region 1); French (Region 1) | | | Chicago Fire Season 7 Crossover Episodes; "Going to War"; "What I Saw"; Chicago Med Season 4 Crossover Episode - "When to Let Go" |
| Release dates | | | Chicago Fire Season 7 Crossover Episodes; "Going to War"; "What I Saw"; Chicago Med Season 4 Crossover Episode - "When to Let Go" |
| United States | United Kingdom | Australia | Chicago Fire Season 7 Crossover Episodes; "Going to War"; "What I Saw"; Chicago Med Season 4 Crossover Episode - "When to Let Go" |
| September 10, 2019 | | | Chicago Fire Season 7 Crossover Episodes; "Going to War"; "What I Saw"; Chicago Med Season 4 Crossover Episode - "When to Let Go" |
