= Priory (band) =

American rock band

- Origin: Portland, Oregon, United States
- Genres: Indietronica; indie pop; alternative dance; psychedelic pop
- Years active: 2009–2016
- Label: Warner Bros.
- Members: Brandon Johnson; Kyle Dieker
- Past members: Greg Harpel; Richie Stitch; Miles Johnson
- Website: prioryband.com

Priory was a three-piece American rock band based out of Portland, Oregon. The band formed in 2008 and released their first record on Expunged Records in 2011. The band's single, "Weekend", reached #30 on Billboard's Hot Rock & Alternative Songs chart and #37 on Billboard's Mainstream Top 40 chart in 2015. The band's sound is a blend of electronic instrumentation and heavy guitar.

== Need To Know (2014–2015) ==
Priory signed to Warner Bros. Records in the spring of 2014. On June 30, 2014, Priory released their single "Weekend" on iTunes. On September 3, 2014, Priory premiered the video, directed by David Vincent Wolf, on Idolator; it stars actors Bailey Noble and Nick Krause. The band completed work on their second full-length album Need To Know, which was released in 2014 by Warner Bros. Records. They then left on a nationwide tour supporting The Kooks later in 2014, along with supporting artist Halsey. During the tour they promoted their first single "Weekend", peaking at #15 on Billboard Alternative Charts and #26 on Billboard Pop Charts. Priory later flew to New York and performed on MTV Big Morning Buzz, and several months later performed on Jimmy Kimmel Live! in Los Angeles. In 2015 the band left on tour as support for Kaiser Chiefs.

== Discography ==
=== Studio albums ===
List of studio albums
| Title | Album details |
|---|---|
| Priory | Released: June 21, 2011; Label: Expunged; Formats: CD, digital download |
| Need To Know | Released: 2015; Label: Warner Bros.; Formats: CD, digital download |

=== Extended plays ===
List of extended plays
| Title | Album details |
|---|---|
| Weekend | Released: October 14, 2014; Label: Warner Bros.; Formats: Digital download |

=== Singles ===
List of singles, with selected chart positions, showing year released and album name
| Title | Year | Peak chart positions | | | | Album |
| Title | Year | AUS | US Alt. | US Pop | US Rock | Album |
|---|---|---|---|---|---|---|
| "Weekend" | 2014 | 89 | 15 | 37 | 30 | Need To Know |
"—" denotes a recording that did not chart or was not released in that territory.

== Members ==
- Brandon Johnson: lead vocals, bass (2008-2014) lead vocals, guitar (2014-2016)
- Kyle Dieker: guitar, vocals, samples (since 2008)

=== Past members ===
- Greg Harpel: guitar (2008-2014)
- Richie Stitch: drums (2008-2011)
- Joe Mengis: drums (2011-2015)
- Miles Johnson: drums (since 2016), bass (live, 2014–2016)
- Rian Lewis: dynthesizers and percussion (2014-2015)
