= Summer of 8 =

- Theatrical release poster
- Directed by: Ryan Schwartz
- Screenplay by: Ryan Schwartz
- Produced by: Steven J. Berger; Michael M. McGuire
- Starring: Carter Jenkins; Matt Shively; Shelley Hennig; Bailey Noble; Rachel DiPillo; Natalie Hall
- Cinematography: Martim Vian
- Edited by: Aaron Brock; Zack Stoff
- Music by: Tobias Norberg
- Production companies: Object in Motion; Organically Grown Productions; Provenance Pictures; TrustFall Films
- Distributed by: Orion Pictures; FilmBuff
- Release dates: April 26, 2016 (NBFF); September 1, 2016 (Theatrical release)
- Running time: 88 minutes
- Country: United States
- Language: English

Summer of 8 is a 2016 American comedy-drama film written and directed by Ryan Schwartz. It is Schwartz's directorial debut.

== Premise ==
Eight close friends soak up their last day of summer together on the beach before parting ways for college.

== Cast ==
- Carter Jenkins as Jesse
- Shelley Hennig as Lily Hunter
- Matt Shively as Oscar
- Natalie Hall as Jen
- Michael Grant as Aiden
- Bailey Noble as Serena
- Nick Marini as Bobby
- Rachel DiPillo as Emily
- Sonya Walger as Diane

== Production ==
The film was shot in Newport Beach, California.
