= Bailey Noble =

American actress

- Born: Bailey Ann Noble; October 13, 1990 (age 35); Bethlehem, Pennsylvania, U.S.
- Education: Saucon Valley High School
- Occupation: Actress
- Years active: 2000; 2011–present

Bailey Ann Noble (born October 13, 1990) is an American actress. She played Adilyn Bellefleur, the half-fairy daughter of sheriff Andy Bellefleur, on HBO's vampire drama series True Blood (2013–2014), and Anna Assaoui in the 2015 remake of Martyrs.

== Filmography ==
=== Film ===
Year	Title	Role	Notes
2000	Just for the Time Being	Kate	
2014	The Haircut	Amy Collins	Short film
2015	Velvet Karma	Isabelle	Short film
2015	Martyrs	Anna Assaoui	
2016	The Good Neighbor	Carly	
2016	Summer of 8	Serena	
2016	Hard Sell	Katy	
2016	The Elvis Room	Kat	Short film
2017	The Archer	Lauren Pierce	
2019	The Way You Look Tonight	Ellie	
2021	Flag Day	Debbie	

=== Television ===
Year	Title	Role	Notes
2011	Off the Map	Shannon	Episode: "I'm Here"
2010-2011	First Day	Rosie Rovello	6 episodes
2012	The Ropes	Tammy	Episode: "Interrogation"
2012	Glee	Bunhead #2	Episode: "Makeover"
2012	Secret Diary of an American Cheerleader	Mandy	5 episodes
2013	Malibu Country	Miss North Dakota	Episode: "Cold Shower"
2013	90210	Hellen	Episode: "Dude, Where's My Husband?"
2013–2014	True Blood	Adilyn Bellefleur	Recurring role (season 6); main role (season 7); 17 episodes
2016	Lucifer	Lindsay Jolson	Episode: "Manly Whatnots"
2016–2017	The Last Tycoon	Bess Burrows	Recurring role
2016–2017	Timeless	Amy Preston	2 episodes
2017	Law & Order: True Crime	Jamie Pisarcik	5 episodes
2018	The Last Ship	Courtney Abbott	Recurring role
2018	The Resident	Laurie Dante	Episode: "Nightmares"
2019	The Rookie	Rachel	Episode: "Redwood"
2020	Criminal Minds	Becky Silverman	Episode: "Family Tree"
2021	Them	Marlene	3 episodes

=== Web ===
Year	Title	Role	Notes
2011	First Day 2: First Dance	Rosie Rovello	6 episodes
2012	Secret Diary of an American Cheerleader	Mandy	5 episodes
2013	True Blood: Jessica's Blog	Adilyn Bellefleur	Episode: "Faerie Friends"

=== Music videos ===
- "Weekend" (2014) by Priory
