= Rachel DiPillo =

American actress

- Occupation: Actress
- Years active: 2009–18; 2024–25

Rachel DiPillo is an American actress. She is best known for her roles as Andie in The CW's comedy drama television series Jane the Virgin and as Dr. Sarah Reese in NBC's medical drama television series Chicago Med.

== Early life ==
Rachel DiPillo grew up in Nashville, Tennessee.

== Career ==
In 2015, DiPillo played Andie in the series Jane the Virgin. She starred in NBC's comedy pilot Cuckoo based on the British sitcom of the same name with Michael Chiklis and Cheryl Hines in spring 2015, but the network ultimately passed on the project. DiPillo played Sarah Reese in Chicago Med (season 1–3; 10), which premiered on November 17, 2015. She made appearances with the character throughout Chicago PD and Chicago Fire.

== Filmography ==
=== Film ===
Year	Title	Role	Notes
2010	Elle: A Modern Cinderella Tale	Partygoer	
2012	Werewolf: The Beast Among Us	Eva	Direct-to-video film
2012	Photo Finish	Jenny	Short film
2012	Commencement	Rachel	
2014	A Kind of Love	Rachel	Short film
2014	Hello, My Name Is Frank	Laura	
2016	Summer of 8	Emily	
2016	Recovery	Kim	

=== Television and web series ===
Year	Title	Role	Notes
2009–2010	Big Time Rush	Pretty Girl	Recurring role; 7 episodes
2010	The Gates	Lexie Wade	Recurring role; 7 episodes
2011	Law & Order: LA	Sylvie Lester	Episode: "Runyon Canyon"
2011	Love Bites	Natasha	Episode: "Too Much Information"
2011	Hawthorne	Sarah Colton	Episode: "Let Freedom Sing"
2011	Wendy	Fawn	Web series; recurring role, 9 episodes
2012	The Ropes	Jenny	Recurring role; 2 episodes
2012	Revenge	Jaime Cardaci	Recurring role 2 episodes; as Rachel Katherine DiPillo
2012	Bones	Miranda Spedding	Episode: "The Ghost in the Machine"; as Rachel Katherine DiPillo
2013	Untitled Bounty Hunter Project	Josie Scutaro	Unsold television pilot
2013	Emily Owens, M.D.	Allison McLeary	Episode: "Emily and... The Car and the Cards"
2014	Mad Men	Sherry	Recurring role; 2 episodes
2015	NCIS	Chelsea	Episode: "The Enemy Within"
2015	Jane the Virgin	Andie	Recurring role; 4 episodes
2015	Cuckoo	Rachel	Unsold television pilot
2015–2018, 2024–2025	Chicago Med	Dr. Sarah Reese	Main role (seasons 1–3); Guest role (season 4); Recurring role (season 10); 65 episodes
2015, 2017	Chicago Fire	Dr. Sarah Reese	Guest role; 2 episodes
2016	Untitled Castleberry/Davis Project	Mariah Windsor	Unsold television pilot
2016	Edgar Allan Poe's Murder Mystery; Dinner Party	Microwave	Television mini-series
2016–2017	Chicago P.D.	Dr. Sarah Reese	Guest role; 2 episodes
