= Chicago Med =

American television series (2015–present)

- Genre: Medical drama
- Created by: Dick Wolf; Matt Olmstead
- Developed by: Derek Haas; Michael Brandt
- Showrunners: Allen MacDonald; Andrew Schneider; Andrew Dettmann; Diane Frolov
- Starring: Nick Gehlfuss; Yaya DaCosta; Torrey DeVitto; Rachel DiPillo; Colin Donnell; Brian Tee; S. Epatha Merkerson; Oliver Platt; Marlyne Barrett; Norma Kuhling; Dominic Rains; Steven Weber; Guy Lockard; Kristen Hager; Jessy Schram; Luke Mitchell; Sarah Ramos; Darren Barnet
- Composer: Atli Örvarsson
- Country of origin: United States
- Original language: English
- No. of seasons: 12
- No. of episodes: 226 (list of episodes)

Production
- Executive producers: Dick Wolf; Diane Frolov; Andrew Schneider; Allen MacDonald; Stephen Hootstein; Michael Waxman; Matt Olmstead; Michael Brandt; Derek Haas; Danielle Gelber; Arthur W. Forney; Peter Jankowski
- Producers: Charles S. Carroll; Jeffrey Drayer; David Weinstein; Simran Baidwan; Will Pascoe; Safura Favavi; Niki Delone; Meridith Friedman; Lauren MacKenzie; Andrew Gettens
- Production location: Chicago, Illinois
- Camera setup: Single-camera
- Running time: 40–44 minutes
- Production companies: Wolf Entertainment (Note: Credited as Wolf Films from 2015 to 2019); Universal Television

Original release
- Network: NBC
- Release: November 17, 2015 – present

Related
- Chicago Fire; Chicago Justice; Chicago P.D.

Chicago Med is an American medical drama series broadcast by NBC and created by Dick Wolf as the third installment of the Chicago franchise. It stars Nick Gehlfuss, Yaya DaCosta, Torrey DeVitto, Rachel DiPillo, Colin Donnell, Brian Tee, S. Epatha Merkerson, Oliver Platt, Marlyne Barrett, Norma Kuhling, Dominic Rains, Steven Weber, Guy Lockard, Kristen Hager, Jessy Schram, Luke Mitchell, Sarah Ramos and Darren Barnet. It premiered on November 17, 2015.

Chicago Med follows the emergency department doctors and nurses of the fictional Gaffney Chicago Medical Center. As they work to save lives, these members deal with the personal and professional pressures of their jobs.

In March 2026, the series was renewed for a twelfth season, which premiered on October 7, 2026.

== Premise ==
Set in Chicago, Chicago Med is the third series in Dick Wolf's Chicago franchise. It focuses on the emergency department at Gaffney Chicago Medical Center and on its doctors and nurses as they work to save patients' lives. It sometimes crosses over with characters from Chicago Fire and Chicago P.D.

== Cast ==
- Nick Gehlfuss as Dr. Will Halstead (main seasons 1–8; guest season 11), a former plastic surgeon, who, at the start of the series becomes an ED supervising attending physician. He is the older brother of Chicago P.D. character Detective Jay Halstead. He was engaged to Dr. Natalie Manning in seasons 3 and 4. He resigns from Chicago Med at the end of season 8 after sabotaging Jack Dayton's OR 2.0 to prove its defects, and moves to Seattle to reunite with Natalie and her son.
- Yaya DaCosta as April Sexton (main seasons 1–6; recurring season 8), a first-generation Brazilian American ED senior nurse. She has a younger brother, Noah, who began as a third-year medical student at the hospital. She is a childhood friend of Chicago Fire character Kelly Severide. In season 6, she is accepted into a nurse practitioner program to do more in caring for patients, and in the season 7 premiere, it is revealed she has started the program. She later returns in season 8 after completing the program. She and Dr. Ethan Choi rekindle their relationship during this time, and marry midway through the season, with the intent of starting a mobile clinic for the impoverished people in the community.
- Torrey DeVitto as Dr. Natalie Manning (main seasons 1–6; guest seasons 7–8, 11), an ED pediatrics fellow who did a fellowship in emergency medicine in season 1 and becomes an attending in the emergency pediatrics division in season 5. She is a widow, coping with the loss of her husband, Jeff, who was killed in action while serving in the U.S. military. In season 1, she gives birth to her son, Owen. In the season 7 premiere, she is fired by Sharon Goodwin and moves back to Seattle with Owen after admitting to stealing drugs for her sick mother from Dr. Halstead's clinical trial. She later reunites with Halstead following his resignation at the end of season 8.
- Rachel DiPillo as Dr. Sarah Reese (main seasons 1–3; guest season 4; recurring season 10), originally a fourth-year medical student who does not feel drawn to emergency medicine and would rather become a pathologist. After graduating from medical school, she immediately leaves pathology and becomes a first-year resident in psychiatry, thanks to Dr. Daniel Charles, in the season 2 premiere. In the season 4 premiere, she transfers out of Chicago Med after Dr. Charles finds out her father is a suspected serial killer and they have a falling-out. She returns in season 10, and, following yet another argument with Dr. Charles about a patient's care, she is able to make peace with her former mentor.
- Colin Donnell as Dr. Connor Rhodes (main seasons 1–5; guest season 12), a trauma and cardiothoracic surgeon from Chicago, who spent some time in Riyadh following his residency. In season 1, he is a trauma surgeon, but switches his specialty to cardiothoracics. In the season 5 premiere, he leaves Med and Chicago completely when his ex-girlfriend, Dr. Ava Bekker, dies by suicide after murdering his father to win him back.
- Brian Tee as Lieutenant Commander Dr. Ethan Choi, United States Navy Reserve (seasons 1–8), an attending physician of emergency medicine specializing in infectious diseases who has just returned to the United States after serving on the USS Carl Vinson as a medical officer. He marries April Sexton midway through season 8 and leaves Chicago Med afterwards to start a mobile clinic for the impoverished people in the community with her.
- S. Epatha Merkerson as Sharon Goodwin, a former ED Charge Nurse and a certified critical care nurse who currently is the Executive Director of Patient and Medical Services of Gaffney Chicago Medical Center.
- Oliver Platt as Dr. Daniel Charles, the Chief of Psychiatry and Behavioral Health, who is usually tasked with helping the other doctors deal with the psychological nuances of medicine or difficult patients. He is a graduate of the University of Pennsylvania.
- Marlyne Barrett as Maggie Lockwood (recurring season 1; main seasons 2–10), the ED charge nurse who is not afraid to speak her mind when it comes to schooling the residents, but is caring, kind, and fights for her patients. In season 5, she is diagnosed with metastatic breast cancer, but is later cured. She temporarily leaves Med after season 10 for personal reasons.
- Norma Kuhling as Dr. Ava Bekker (recurring season 2; main seasons 3–5), a South African second-year resident and later attending physician in cardiothoracic surgery. She butts heads with Dr. Connor Rhodes on professional boundaries, and eventually their rivalry becomes a romantic relationship, which eventually ends after his father alleges Ava seduced and slept with him to persuade him into funding Connor's hybrid OR. In the season 4 finale, Connor turns her down in reconciling their relationship and then suspects her of killing his father. In the season 5 premiere, she dies by suicide after admitting to killing Connor's father in an effort to win him back.
- Dominic Rains as Dr. Crockett Marcel (seasons 5–9), a new trauma surgeon. At the end of season 9, he is devastated when a young patient, for whom he had to cancel a life-saving transplant due to a last-minute infection, succumbs to his disease. Immediately after, the boy's father commits suicide. The experience reminded Marcel of his own daughter's death, and, in the season 10 premiere, it is revealed he has moved to Boston for a fresh start.
- Steven Weber as Dr. Dean Archer (recurring season 6; main season 7–present), an experienced trauma surgeon and emergency physician and mentor to Dr. Ethan Choi, whom he formerly served with in the Navy. He eventually takes over as Chief of Emergency Medicine before becoming co-head of the department in season 10, and eventually goes back to being an attending physician after Dr. Caitlin Lenox takes over all management responsibilities.
- Guy Lockard as Dr. Dylan Scott (seasons 7–8), a pediatric emergency medicine physician. He is a former Chicago police officer who switched his career to medicine. In the season 8 premiere, he realizes he will never be able to escape his past as a cop if he remains in Chicago, and leaves Med and Chicago completely for a fresh start.
- Kristen Hager as Dr. Stevie Hammer (season 7), a new attending physician in emergency medicine and former rival of Dr. Will Halstead during their time in medical school. After many ups and downs in dealing with her homeless, addicted, and mentally ill mother, she moves back to Michigan midway through season 7 to give her marriage another chance.
- Jessy Schram as Dr. Hannah Asher (recurring seasons 5–6; main season 7–present), a board-certified attending physician in obstetrics and gynecology from Los Angeles who previously struggled with substance abuse before getting sober.
- Luke Mitchell as Dr. Mitch Ripley (season 9–present), an ED attending physician whom Dr. Charles treated as a violent delinquent who has since turned his life around.
- Sarah Ramos as Dr. Caitlin Lenox (season 10–present), an attending physician with board certification in trauma surgery, who becomes the new co-head of the ED, and eventually outright Chief of Emergency Medicine. A former Army Special Forces member, Lenox is an often fearless physician with a measured and rational demeanor. When her compassion surfaces, it proves to be surprisingly sincere and creative.
- Darren Barnet as Dr. Jonathan Frost (season 10–present), an emergency pediatrics resident who joined Med after the hospital he previously worked at closed. A former teenage actor, he used to star in a popular television series.

== Episodes ==
Season	Episodes	Originally released		Rank	Average viewers (million)
Season	Episodes	First released	Last released	Rank	Average viewers (million)
Pilot		April 7, 2015		—N/a	8.43
1	18	November 17, 2015	May 17, 2016	37	9.83
2	23	September 22, 2016	May 11, 2017	28	9.47
3	20	November 21, 2017	May 15, 2018	27	10.10
4	22	September 26, 2018	May 22, 2019	15	11.04
5	20	September 25, 2019	April 15, 2020	12	11.22
6	16	November 11, 2020	May 26, 2021	9	9.74
7	22	September 22, 2021	May 25, 2022	11	9.11
8	22	September 21, 2022	May 24, 2023	10	8.46
9	13	January 17, 2024	May 22, 2024	11	8.07
10	22	September 25, 2024	May 21, 2025	17	9.50
11	21	October 1, 2025	May 13, 2026	16	9.20
12	21	October 7, 2026	TBA	TBA	TBA

=== Crossovers ===
- "The Beating Heart" (Chicago Fire Season 4, Episode 10) / "Now I'm God" (Chicago P.D. Season 3, Episode 10) – In the first crossover with Fire and P.D., continuing on "Malignant", a member of Firehouse 51 is rushed to Chicago Med for a stabbing while an attempted suicide uncovers four cases of chemo overdose, leading to an investigation that becomes personal for Voight.
- "Going to War" (Chicago Fire Season 7, Episode 2) / "Endings" (Chicago P.D. Season 6, Episode 2) – In the second crossover with Fire and P.D., continuing on "When to Let Go", the victims of an apartment complex fire are rushed into Chicago Med and Intelligence races to find the culprit.
- "Infection" (Chicago Fire Season 8, Episode 4/Chicago Med Season 5, Episode 4/Chicago P.D. Season 7, Episode 4) – In the third crossover with Fire and P.D., a bioterrorist spreads a deadly virus throughout Chicago.
- "In the Trenches" ("Chicago Fire" Season 13, Episode 11/"Chicago Med" Season 10, Episode 11/"Chicago P.D." Season 12, Episode 11).
- "Reckoning" ("Chicago Fire" Season 14 Episode 13/"Chicago Med" Season 11, Episode 13/"Chicago P.D." Season 13, Episode 13).

== Production ==
=== Development ===
The series was greenlit by NBC for the show's pilot episode on May 1, 2015. On August 21, 2015, Andrew Dettman stepped down as showrunner due to "creative differences" following his appointment in June. Andrew Schneider and Diane Frolov were appointed as new showrunners on August 27, 2015. NBC originally ordered 13 episodes for season one; on December 11, 2015, an additional 5 episodes were ordered, bringing the season to 18 episodes.

On February 1, 2016, NBC renewed the series for a second season. On May 15, 2016, it was announced that the series would be moving to Thursdays. The second season premiered on September 22, 2016. On May 10, 2017, NBC renewed the series for a third season but opted to remove it from the fall schedule to midseason, after the premiere of Dick Wolf's sixth Law & Order series Law & Order True Crime. The series moved back to Tuesdays after spending one season on Thursdays.

On February 27, 2020, NBC renewed the series for a sixth, seventh, and eighth season. The sixth season premiered on November 11, 2020. The seventh season premiered on September 22, 2021. The eighth season premiered on September 21, 2022. On March 13, 2020, Universal Television shut down production on the series due to the COVID-19 pandemic.

On April 10, 2023, NBC renewed the series for a ninth season, which premiered on January 17, 2024. On March 21, 2024, NBC renewed the series for a tenth season which premiered on September 25, 2024. On May 5, 2025, NBC renewed the series for an eleventh season which premiered on October 1, 2025. On March 27, 2026, the series was renewed for a twelfth season.

=== Casting ===
The Walking Dead star Laurie Holden was originally cast as Dr. Hannah Tramble, but dropped out due to "family reasons". On May 29, 2015, Arrow star Colin Donnell was cast as Dr. Connor Rhodes, the hospital's newest trauma surgeon. In July 2015, Jurassic World star Brian Tee joined the cast as Dr. Ethan Choi, an expert in infectious disease prevention and a Navy Reserve medical officer. Pretty Little Liars star Torrey DeVitto was cast on August 13, 2015, as Dr. Natalie Manning, the ED pediatrician. On August 14, 2015, Jane the Virgin star Rachel DiPillo was cast as Sarah Reese, a fourth-year medical student.

On April 19, 2019, NBC announced that original cast member Colin Donnell and Norma Kuhling would be written out of the series at the end of the fourth season for creative reasons. On May 12, 2021, NBC announced that original cast members Yaya DaCosta and Torrey DeVitto would leave the series at the end of the sixth season after deciding not to renew their contracts to pursue new roles. On July 21, 2021, it was announced that Steven Weber would be promoted to a series regular after recurring in the sixth season, and Guy Lockard and Kristen Hager would join the main cast. On October 12, 2022, NBC announced that Tee would leave the series after eight seasons.

== Reception ==
=== Ratings ===
Viewership and ratings per season of Chicago Med
Season	Timeslot (ET)	Episodes	First aired		Last aired		TV season	Viewership rank	Avg. viewers (millions)	18–49 rank
Season	Timeslot (ET)	Episodes	Date	Viewers (millions)	Date	Viewers (millions)	TV season	Viewership rank	Avg. viewers (millions)	18–49 rank
1	Tuesday 9:00 pm	18	November 17, 2015	8.64	May 17, 2016	7.86	2015–16	37	9.83	30
2	Thursday 9:00 pm	23	September 22, 2016	7.02	May 11, 2017	7.01	2016–17	28	9.47	28
3	Tuesday 10:00 pm	20	November 21, 2017	6.19	May 15, 2018	5.62	2017–18	27	10.10	26
4	Wednesday 8:00 pm	22	September 26, 2018	7.78	May 22, 2019	7.55	2018–19	15	11.04	25
5	Wednesday 8:00 pm	20	September 25, 2019	7.53	April 15, 2020	9.33	2019–20	12	11.22	15
6	Wednesday 8:00 pm	16	November 11, 2020	7.83	May 26, 2021	7.26	2020–21	9	9.74	14
7	Wednesday 8:00 pm	22	September 22, 2021	6.81	May 25, 2022	6.43	2021–22	11	9.11	11
8	Wednesday 8:00 pm	22	September 21, 2022	6.59	May 24, 2023	5.55	2022–23	9	8.48	TBD
9	Wednesday 8:00 pm	13	January 17, 2024	6.93	May 22, 2024	5.49	2023–24	12	8.20	TBD
10	Wednesday 8:00 pm	22	September 25, 2024	5.46	May 21, 2025	5.81	2024–25	TBD	TBD	TBD
11	Wednesday 8:00 pm	21	October 1, 2025	5.36	May 13, 2026	5.41	2025–26	TBD	TBD	TBD
12	Wednesday 8:00 pm	TBA	October 7, 2026	5.64	TBA	TBD	2026–27	TBD	TBD	TBD

=== Reviews ===
On Metacritic, season 1 has a weighted average score of 52 out of 100 based on 17 reviews, indicating "mixed or average" reviews. Meanwhile, Rotten Tomatoes reported that 50% of critics had given the first season of the show a positive review, based on 26 reviews, with an average rating of 5.52/10. The site's critics consensus reads, "While adding nothing new to the established medical procedural formula, Dick Wolf's Chicago Med hits its familiar beats forcefully enough to satisfy a few genre enthusiasts."

== Broadcast and streaming ==
=== North America ===
Chicago Med airs on NBC. It is available through the network's streaming platforms, and Hulu, with previous season "stacking rights" on the former, and pay-per-episode purchase via electronic sell-through platforms. The series is available for streaming on Peacock along with Chicago Fire, Chicago P.D., Law & Order, Law & Order: Special Victims Unit and Law & Order: Criminal Intent. The first seven seasons of the show are available on Amazon Prime Video in the European Union. In Canada, the series aired on the Global Television Network for four seasons, then moved to Citytv. Season three aired at the start of the week ahead of the NBC air date later in the week.

=== Asia ===
In Malaysia, the series aired on PRIMEtime for five seasons, then moved to Showcase. In Southeast Asia, the series aired on Rock Entertainment for more seasons. In Türkiye, Season 10 is streaming on TODTv.

=== Europe ===
In the United Kingdom, Chicago Med premiered on March 20, 2016, on Universal Channel in the United Kingdom and Ireland. The second season aired on October 23, 2016. Since the fifth season, it has aired on Sky Witness. In Romania, the series debuted on February 16, 2017, on the channel Diva under the title "Camera de gardă" (The guard room). The sixth season premiered on March 7, 2021.

=== Oceania ===
In Australia, the series debuted on November 23, 2016, on the Nine Network.

== Syndication ==
The series was set to air syndicated reruns on USA Network and Lifetime in January 2025.

== Awards ==
Year	Award	Category	Nominee	Result	Ref.
2017	Young Artist Awards	Best Performance in a TV Series - Guest Starring Teen Actress	Haley Brooke Walker	Won	
