= Norma Kuhling =

American actress (born 1990)

- Born: Norma Zea Kuhling; 1990 (age 35–36); New York, U.S.
- Education: London Academy of Music and Dramatic Art
- Occupation: Actress
- Years active: 2009–present
- Mother: Kristi Zea

Norma Zea Kuhling (born 1990) is an American actress. She is known for her roles as Dr. Ava Bekker in the NBC medical drama series Chicago Med and as Jo Mitchel in the 2019 independent film Fourteen. She currently plays Assistant District Attorney Cindy "CJ" Jones in the long-running NBC crime/legal drama series Law & Order: Special Victims Unit.

== Career ==
Kuhling's early roles include the 2009 comedy-drama film The Joneses and a 2011 production of Michael Weller's play Moonchildren at the Berkshire Theatre Festival. In 2016, she acted in the romantic fantasy film Fallen and made guest appearances in the first season of Falling Water. Kuhling joined the NBC medical drama series Chicago Med in 2017 as Dr. Ava Bekker, an ambitious cardiothoracic surgery fellow. She first appeared in the season 2 finale, "Love Hurts", and was a series regular in seasons 3 and 4 until her departure from the series in 2019.

She starred in the 2019 independent film Fourteen as Jo Mitchel, a troubled social worker who maintains a complicated friendship with her friend Mara (portrayed by Tallie Medel). Kuhling's and Medel's performances received critical praise; Richard Brody of The New Yorker described the performances as "poised and thoughtful", and Guy Lodge of Variety applauded Kuhling's "rangy, room-consuming physicality" that complemented Medel's character. Barry Hertz, writing for The Globe and Mail, commented that Kuhling added "layers and history to what seems like a Greta Gerwig spin on the Manic Pixie Dream Girl", and described the acting as "quietly powerful". After Fourteen was released theatrically, Jon Frosch of The Hollywood Reporter counted Kuhling's and Medel's performances as among the best film performances of 2020.

As of 2021, Kuhling plays Nora Fowler, a tactical medic, on the CBS action drama series S.W.A.T.

== Personal life ==
Kuhling was born and raised in New York, and she is the daughter of production designer Kristi Zea and Michael Kuhling. She trained at the London Academy of Music and Dramatic Art.

== Filmography ==
Film performances
Year	Title	Role	Ref.
2009	The Joneses	Beth	
2016	Fallen	Rachel	
2019	Fourteen	Jo Mitchel	

Television performances
Year	Title	Role	Notes	Ref.
2016	Falling Water	Elise Martins	2 episodes	
2017–2019	Chicago Med	Dr. Ava Bekker	44 episodes	
2018	Chicago Fire	Dr. Ava Bekker	Episode: "All the Proof"	
2021–2022	S.W.A.T.	Nora Fowler	7 episodes	
2025–present	Law & Order: Special Victims Unit	A.D.A. Cindy Jones	Recurring role	

Stage performances
Year	Title	Role	Venue	Ref.
2011	Moonchildren	Karen	Berkshire Theatre Festival	
