= Marlyne Barrett =

American actress

- Born: Marlyne Nayokah Afflack; September 13, 1978 (age 48); Brooklyn, New York, U.S
- Occupation: Actress
- Years active: 1997–present
- Spouse: Gavin Barrett (m. 2009)
- Children: 2

Marlyne Nayokah Barrett (née Afflack: born September 13, 1978) is an American actress. She is best known for her starring role in the NBC medical drama Chicago Med portraying Charge Nurse Maggie Lockwood from 2015 to 2025. In 2005, she appeared in the film Hitch. She had a recurring role from 2006 to 2008 as Nerese Campbell in the HBO crime drama The Wire and in 2007, she had a recurring role as Felicia Marquand in the FX legal drama Damages.

== Life and career ==
Barrett was born as Marlyne Nayokah Afflack in Brooklyn, New York. She began her career appearing on stage and television, before she co-starred with Hill Harper in the 2003 romantic comedy Love, Sex and Eating the Bones. In the late 90s, she was a DJ for the TV station Musique Plus in Montreal, Canada. Later in 2000s, Barrett had a number of guest starring television roles on the New York City-filmed dramas, include the NBC police procedural drama Law & Order and its spin-offs Law & Order: Special Victims Unit, Law & Order: Trial by Jury and the short-lived NBC legal drama Conviction. From 2006 to 2008, she played Nerese Campbell in the HBO crime drama The Wire, and in 2007, also had a recurring role as attorney Felicia Marquand in the FX legal drama Damages. In 2009, Barrett co-starred as Thomasina, the efficient palace secretary and aide-de-camp, on the short-lived NBC drama Kings.

In 2015, Barrett returned to television appearing as Det. Chris Thompson in the first two episodes of the ABC crime drama American Crime. Later that year, she was cast as Nurse Maggie Lockwood in the NBC medical drama Chicago Med. She was credited in the recurring cast in the first thirteen episodes and was added to the main cast in the fourteenth episode. In addition to Chicago Med, she also appeared as a recurring character in Chicago Fire and Chicago P.D. between 2016 and 2019.

== Personal life ==
She is married to Gavin Barrett, a pastor, and they have two children. On September 27, 2022, Barrett announced that she had been diagnosed with uterine and ovarian cancer, and that she was undergoing "aggressive" chemotherapy treatment to fight the disease, before undergoing a hysterectomy later in the year.

== Filmography ==
=== Film ===
Year	Title	Role	Notes
1999	Angelique	Angelique	Short film
2000	The Growing Pains Movie	Jody	Television film
2001	Hidden Agenda	Airport Stewardess	
2001	Heist	Young Woman	
2003	Good Fences	Tina	Television film
2003	Love, Sex and Eating the Bones	Jasmine LeJeune	
2005	Hitch	Stephanie	
2006	Off the Black	Nancy	
2016	Quest	Sheila	
2017	Night Call	Kadedra Domek	Short film; also executive producer
2018	After Everything	Dr. Beatty	

=== Television ===
Year	Title	Role	Notes
2004	The Jury	Faith Ward	Episode: "Mail Order Mystery"
2005	Law & Order	Alana Sinclair	Episode: "Obsession"
2005	Law & Order: Trial by Jury	Diane Harris	Episode: "Pattern of Conduct"
2005	Rescue Me	Coma Boy's Mom	Episodes: "Shame" & "Believe"
2005	Law & Order: Special Victims Unit	Sarah Miller	Episode: "Night"
2006	Law & Order: Special Victims Unit	Alma Cordoza	Episode: "Cage"
2006	Conviction	Dr. Donner	Episode: "Madness"
2006–2008	The Wire	Council President Nerese Campbell	Recurring role
2007	Damages	Felicia Marquand	Recurring role
2007–2008	Law & Order	Attorney Bocanegra	Episodes: "Murder Book" & "Tango"
2009	Kings	Thomasina	Recurring role
2009	Bored to Death	Ava	Episode: "Stockholm Syndrome"
2009	The Good Wife	Thalia Ramsey	Episode: "Lifeguard"
2010	Gossip Girl	Martha Chamberlain	Episode: "Goodbye, Columbia"
2014	Satisfaction	Lauretta	Episode: "Through Revelation"
2015	American Crime	Det. Chris Thompson	Episodes: "Episode One" and "Episode Two"
2015–2025	Chicago Med	Nurse Maggie Lockwood	Main role 198 episoden in 10 Seasons
2016–2025	Chicago P.D.	Nurse Maggie Lockwood	Recurring role
2016–2019	Chicago Fire	Nurse Maggie Lockwood	Recurring role
