= Peter Jankowski =

American television and film producer (born 1964)

- Born: January 8, 1964 (age 62); New York City, U.S.
- Education: College of the Holy Cross (BA)
- Occupations: Executive producer, media executive, Film developer

Peter F. Jankowski (born January 8, 1964) is an American television, film producer and film developer. He is President and Chief Operating Officer of Dick Wolf's Wolf Entertainment, headquartered in Universal City, California. His work across both film and television have earned him an Academy Award, a Grammy Award, and a nomination for an Emmy Award. Jankowski has produced over 1900 episodes of television.

== Early life, family and education ==
Jankowski was born in Jamaica, Queens, New York City, New York, and raised in Westport, Connecticut. His father was an executive at CBS for twenty years.

He attended Fairfield College Preparatory School in Fairfield, Connecticut, graduating in 1982. He graduated from the College of the Holy Cross in 1986 with a degree in history.

== Career ==
Jankowski relocated to California soon after graduating college and became a production assistant on the TV sitcom Growing Pains.

Jankowski served as Senior Vice President of Universal Television where he was responsible for all its series, which included Northern Exposure, Quantum Leap and Coach.

Jankowski works closely on many of Dick Wolf's productions. He joined Wolf's company, Wolf Entertainment, in 1997. Jankowski is an executive producer of the NBC series Law & Order, Law & Order: Special Victims Unit, Chicago Fire, Chicago P.D., Chicago Med, Law & Order: Organized Crime, and CBS series FBI, FBI: Most Wanted and FBI: International. Jankowski was an executive producer on the TV series Law & Order: Criminal Intent, Law & Order True Crime, and New York Undercover as well as several short-lived Wolf series (Law & Order: LA, Law & Order: Trial by Jury, Chicago Justice, and L.A. Dragnet).

In 2003, Jankowski produced the World Trade Center tribute Twin Towers, which won the Academy Award for Best Documentary (Short Subject). He also produced When You're Strange, a documentary about rock musician Jim Morrison and his band The Doors, which made its world premiere at the 2009 Sundance Film Festival and made its international debut at the 2009 Berlin International Film Festival. The film's airing on the PBS series American Masters garnered a 2010 Emmy nomination for Outstanding Nonfiction Series and won a Grammy Award for Outstanding Longform Video in 2011.

== Other activities ==
He was the president of the Hispanic Film Project from 1990 to 1993 and was a producer for 12 films for it. He has served on the board of the Hollywood Radio & Television Society.

== Personal life ==
Jankowski resides in Los Angeles, California. He and his wife, Linda Caruso (also a 1986 graduate of College of the Holy Cross), have two sons.
