= Chicago Fire season 8 =

Chicago Fire
- Season 8
- Showrunner: Derek Haas
- No. of episodes: 20

Release
- Original network: NBC
- Original release: September 25, 2019 – April 15, 2020

Season chronology
- ← Previous; Season 7 Next → Season 9

The eighth season of Chicago Fire, an American drama television series with executive producer Dick Wolf and producers Derek Haas and Matt Olmstead, was ordered on February 26, 2019, by NBC. The season premiered on September 25, 2019. The season concluded on April 15, 2020.

On March 13, 2020, the production of the eighth season was suspended due to the COVID-19 pandemic. Twenty episodes, of a planned 23, were completed.

== Cast and characters ==
=== Main cast ===
- Jesse Spencer as Captain Matthew Casey, Truck Company 81
- Taylor Kinney as Lieutenant Kelly Severide, Squad Company 3
- Kara Killmer as Paramedic in Charge Sylvie Brett, Ambulance 61
- David Eigenberg as Lieutenant Christopher Herrmann, Engine Company 51
- Yuri Sardarov as Firefighter Brian "Otis" Zvonecek, Truck Company 81 (Episode 1)
- Joe Minoso as Firefighter Joe Cruz, Squad Company 3
- Christian Stolte as Firefighter Randy "Mouch" McHolland, Truck Company 81
- Miranda Rae Mayo as Firefighter Stella Kidd, Truck Company 81
- Annie Ilonzeh as Paramedic Emily Foster, Ambulance 61
- Eamonn Walker as Chief Wallace Boden, Battalion 25
- Alberto Rosende as Firefighter Candidate Blake Gallo, Truck 81

=== Recurring characters ===
- Andy Allo as Lieutenant Wendy Seager, OFI
- Randy Flagler as Firefighter Harold Capp, Rescue Squad 3
- Anthony Ferraris as Firefighter Tony Ferraris, Rescue Squad 3
- Daniel Kyri as Firefighter Darren Ritter, Engine 51
- Teddy Sears as Chaplain Kyle Sheffield
- Eloise Mumford as Hope Jacquinot
- Hanako Greensmith as Paramedic Violet Mikami of Firehouse 20
- Gary Cole as Fire Commissioner Carl Grissom

=== Guest characters ===
- Monica Raymund as Gabriela Dawson (Episode 9)
- Brian Geraghty as Sean Roman (Episode 15)
- Steven Boyer as Assistant Deputy Commissioner Jerry Gorsch (Episode 13)

=== Crossover characters ===
- Jesse Lee Soffer as Detective Jay Halstead
- Marina Squerciati as Officer Kim Burgess
- Amy Morton as Desk Sergeant Trudy Platt
- Jason Beghe as Sergeant Hank Voight
- Tracy Spiridakos as Detective Hailey Upton
- Patrick John Flueger as Officer Adam Ruzek
- LaRoyce Hawkins as Officer Kevin Atwater
- Lisseth Chavez as Officer Vanessa Rojas
- Nick Gehlfuss as Dr. Will Halstead
- Yaya DaCosta as April Sexton
- Torrey DeVitto as Dr. Natalie Manning
- Dominic Rains as Dr. Crockett Marcel
- Marlyne Barrett as Charge Nurse Maggie Lockwood
- S. Epatha Merkerson as Sharon Goodwin

== Episodes ==
No. overall	No. in season	Title	Directed by	Written by	Original release date	Prod. code	U.S. viewers (millions)
160	1	"Sacred Ground"	Reza Tabrizi	Derek Haas	September 25, 2019	801	7.32
Chaos ensues at the mattress factory fire, the boiler explodes and Otis is critically injured. He dies at Med from his injuries, devastating Cruz and the rest of 51. Three months later, Brett has moved back to Fowlerton with the Chaplain following their engagement—where she's confronted almost at once by her old friend Hope, who wreaked havoc at 51 in the past. Foster adjusts to Brett's departure with a new recruit. Boden receives news that the CFD has scheduled an inquiry into the mattress fire putting all the blame on Casey. Later on, a memorial is placed at the Firehouse in Otis' name, and Casey is exonerated after Boden stands up for him at the hearing.
161	2	"A Real Shot in the Arm"	Sanford Bookstaver	Andrea Newman & Michael Gilvary	October 2, 2019	802	7.64
Casey and Severide butt heads with Boden about bringing in Gallo, as a new recruit, who seems to be a risk taker following Otis’ death. Meanwhile, Brett contemplates moving back to Chicago as she misses her friends at 51. Meanwhile, Herrmann struggles to sell Otis' share of Molly’s in order to save the bar. Foster tries to bond with her new partner.
162	3	"Badlands"	Olivia Newman	Michael A. O'Shea	October 9, 2019	803	7.70
Brett returns to 51 and immediately she and Foster deal with a call at a juvenile detention center. Brett suspects one of the officers had used gross misconduct against one of the teenage inmates. Meanwhile, Boden receives news about new recruit Gallo’s past and asks Kidd to attend a leadership seminar as the Firehouse 51's representative. Also, everyone at 51 tries to adjust to a new high tech call system.
163	4	"Infection: Part I"	Reza Tabrizi	Teleplay by : Derek Haas; Story by : Dick Wolf & Derek Haas	October 16, 2019	804	8.23
During a tailgate for a Chicago Bears game, Casey and other first responders help a man who has a flesh-eating bacteria on his leg. Soon after, four more victims come down with the same symptoms, leading to a massive outbreak. Later on, 51 responds to a call at a University that specializes in biological research. The team comes to the conclusion that the case was arson. The episode ends with Detective Jay Halstead and Officer Adam Ruzek finding evidence that points to the first victim as the prime suspect. Meanwhile, Cruz plans to propose to his girlfriend Chloe and Boden selects his firehouse to be on duty during the city's Oktoberfest festivities, much to everyone's chagrin. The first part of a three-part episode that continues on Chicago Med and concludes on Chicago P.D.
164	5	"Buckle Up"	Leslie Libman	Matt Whitney	October 23, 2019	805	7.87
After responding to a series of calls involving near fatal car accidents involving tow trucks, Severide begins to suspect that these incidents might be deliberate and launches his own investigation. Hermann lectures one of his kids after coming to the aid of one of the latter's friends at a pool party. Meanwhile, Kidd travels to a leadership conference, but is met with an icy reception—at first. Meanwhile, Brett uses Mouch’s idea to develop a firehouse newsletter. Also, after hearing about Cruz’s break up, Brett tries to encourage Chloe to give Cruz another chance. Cruz runs into Chloe outside his apartment and, after she confesses her fears but presents him a happy surprise, Cruz proposes and they kiss.
165	6	"What Went Wrong"	Sanford Bookstaver	Jamila Daniel	October 30, 2019	806	7.45
Casey comes down hard on Gallo for disobeying a direct order during a call and reconsiders the latter's future in the CFD. After learning about Gallo’s past, Casey tries to get him to open up and explain his actions. Gallo explains that he lost his family in a fire when he was young. Meanwhile, during the same call, the elderly victim dies from her injuries and Severide and Cruz begin to suspect that the fire might have been intentional. Also, Brett, Kidd and Foster create a Women’s lounge at 51. However, things begin to get out of control when women from other firehouses begin to destroy the room. After his engagement, Cruz asks Severide to be his best man.
166	7	"Welcome to Crazytown"	Carl Seaton	Andrea Newman & Michael Gilvary	November 6, 2019	807	7.68
51 deals with a hostage situation while on a call at an apartment fire. At the same call, Hermann gets into a situation with a police officer and is later hit with an assault charge which may result in the loss of his command. Meanwhile, Severide vehemently objects to a transfer order to the Office of Fire Investigations, only to find out the transfer was initiated by Fire Commissioner Grissom. Also, Cruz is infuriated to see his patented “Slamigan” rescue tool copied by a competitor at a firefighting expo.
167	8	"Seeing Is Believing"	Eric Laneuville	Ron McCants	November 13, 2019	808	7.17
51 responds to a house fire where it quickly escalates as the furniture quickly catch fire. Hermann quickly discovers that the manufacturer of the furniture is the same one from the factory that killed Otis. Meanwhile, Severide settles into his new role at OFI. He reopens a case of a grocery store fire that was ruled suspicious because he believes that it was an accident. Meanwhile, Boden asks Kidd to be an instructor at the fire academy. Also, Brett sets up Foster to be a spinning instructor.
168	9	"Best Friend Magic"	Reza Tabrizi	Derek Haas	November 20, 2019	809	8.36
All members of 51 including Casey are shocked to see Gabby Dawson (special guest star Monica Raymund) has returned to Chicago. Casey mulls seeing Dawson again after she invites him to a charity event. Meanwhile, Severide continues to have success at OFI. Stella begins to feel the effects of overworking leading to her getting into a car accident. Also, Cruz asks for Gallo and Ritter’s help after he finds Otis’ old broken flying drone. The episode ends with Severide and a member from OFI investigating a warehouse basement full of flammable objects and an offender with a flare in his hands leaving Severide’s life hanging in the balance.
169	10	"Hold Our Ground"	Matt Earl Beesley	Michael A. O'Shea	January 8, 2020	810	7.95
Severide and the offender escape the basement of a warehouse after the latter holds a lit flare and fights Severide until he is apprehended. Soon after, Severide returns to 51. Meanwhile, Foster begins to butt heads with Brett and questions her leadership as PIC. Also, Casey and Gallo work together to investigate and find missing equipment which was stolen on a call and used to in a string of robberies resulting in all of Firehouse 51 apprehending the thief after a Dukes of Hazzard style chase through the streets of Chicago. Gallo runs into a rival at another firehouse in the process. After a call, Mouch comes across a letter and begins to track down the owner.
170	11	"Where We End Up"	Batán Silva	Matt Whitney	January 15, 2020	811	8.17
After a bedbug infestation hits 51, the team is forced to be relocated to Firehouse 20. Tensions immediately begin to get high with Casey and the other captain while at respective calls and the two nearly come to blows. All tensions are put aside after both teams escape a harrowing fire. Meanwhile, Brett, Kidd and Foster begin to think that Captain Leone has it out for them following their last encounter involving the women's lounge at 51. Gallo and Firehouse 20 paramedic, Violet Mikami continue their affair. Also, Boden receives news about a fellow firefighter and considers new protocols.
171	12	"Then Nick Porter Happened"	Reza Tabrizi	Andrea Newman & Michael Gilvary	January 22, 2020	812	8.18
Firehouse 51 responds to a series of false alarms at a boarding school. Severide and Casey discover there have been multiple false alarms at the same school. Meanwhile, Mouch recommends a new roommate for Cruz and Brett. Later on, they begin to regret the decision as his behavior becomes unbearable. Also, Stella enlists the help of Ritter to surprise Severide for his birthday.
172	13	"A Chicago Welcome"	Paul McCrane	Derek Haas	February 5, 2020	813	8.18
After receiving a new truck and badly needed equipment from Deputy Commissioner Gorsch, Severide and Boden look into what his motives are really about. Meanwhile, after a fire call that claimed an elderly victim, Casey and Brett tend to the victim's husband to figure out about his well-being. Herrmann and Mouch are at odds about the new truck. Also, Cruz begins to get annoyed with Foster after she throws a party at their apartment without inviting him. Gorsch's motive is revealed—and it surprises everyone, especially Boden, with its sincerity. The team rescues a child with the help of several people and later they attend the elderly victim's funeral.
173	14	"Shut It Down"	Leslie Libman	Neil McCormack	February 12, 2020	814	8.28
Casey, Severide and Boden are at a loss when a series of gas leak explosions happen across the area with no explanation. Gallo grows affected by one of the burn victims—a seven-year-old girl sent into a coma—as it brings back memories of his past: his own seven-year-old sister died in the fire that killed their family. Meanwhile, Brett asks for Casey’s help when her birth mother begins to reach out. Cruz struggles with trying to plan his wedding and his bachelor party. Also, with a seat on Hermann’s truck available, Mouch enlists help from Ritter.
174	15	"Off the Grid"	Reza Tabrizi	Matt Whitney	February 26, 2020	815	8.66
51 responds to a call of a group of teenagers overdosing on counterfeit Oxy. Former Chicago patrol officer Sean Roman (special guest star Brian Geraghty) returns to Chicago and informs 51 that his sister is missing and was last seen at that same location. Severide begins to suspect that there is more than what Roman is saying as he begins to search on his own. Casey encourages Brett to meet her birth mother. Severide discovers the youth who sold drugs to Roman's missing sister. The first episode of a two-part crossover that concludes on Chicago P.D.
175	16	"The Tendency of a Drowning Victim"	Matt Earl Beesley	Andrea Newman & Michael Gilvary	March 4, 2020	816	8.26
51 responds to a call where a car crashes into Lake Michigan. Casey and Severide butt heads about rescuing the missing driver. Casey immediately suspects that it wasn’t an accident but the attempted murder of a young woman whose traveling fiance borrowed the car. Meanwhile, Boden and Kidd start a new fad diet together and their attitudes put everyone on edge. Brett and her birth mother Julie bond. Otis’ former girlfriend Lilly returns with an investment opportunity for Hermann. Casey and Severide discover the truth about the car crash—and the fraud behind it—when the crash victim turns up very much alive. Herrmann promises to help Lilly get her bakery open even if he can't help financially. The teams put an end to Boden and Kidd's diet edginess.
176	17	"Protect a Child"	Brenna Malloy	Derek Haas	March 18, 2020	817	9.02
Casey receives news following a call when a fire victim’s neighbor had called DCFS on false charges against her. Meanwhile, after seeing young women on the streets selling drugs, Stella begins a program for at risk teens. Brett receives unexpected romantic attention when looking for a house for pregnant Julie and her husband. Also, after being denied a place for Officer's quarters, Hermann makes himself his own quarters—which doesn't work out quite the way he hoped.
177	18	"I'll Cover You"	Eric Laneuville	Teleplay by : Michael Gilvary & Andrea Newman; Story by : Ron McCants & Michael A. O'Shea	March 25, 2020	818	9.20
Following a call at a motel fire, Severide teams up again with OFI when he discovers a dead body in the bathtub. Meanwhile, Brett continues to get invested with her birth mother Julie. Later on, Julie goes into labor and dies giving birth. Members of 51 team up to find out the location featured in a photo of Casey. Also, Stella begins her new program.
178	19	"Light Things Up"	Nicole Rubio	Elizabeth Sherman	April 8, 2020	819	8.99
On Cruz's wedding day, chaos hits 51 when a group of protestors swarm to the firehouse to rally to get a closed firehouse reopened. Meanwhile, following Julie's death, Brett is forced to make a big decision when the former's husband begins to panic about parenthood. Also, Ritter and Gallo ask Boden for approval to start a social media page for the firehouse. In the end, Cruz and Chloe are happily married.
179	20	"51's Original Bell"	Eric Laneuville	Matt Whitney	April 15, 2020	820	9.46
While at a chemical spill at a factory, Capp is injured and is afraid his career is at risk. Severide soon discovers that the factory had multiple violations with no one shutting it down. Meanwhile, Foster contemplates a big decision whether to return to medical school. Kidd grows concerned with one of her students continuing to not show up at her firefighter group. Also, Gallo begins to have relationship problems.

== Production ==
The season premiere featured the departure of original character Brian "Otis" Zvonecek, played by Yuri Sardarov. Executive producer Derek Haas explained that after the seventh season, they were not sure how they would handle the conclusion to the mattress factory fire. They realised that they had placed characters in danger before having them saved too many times. Haas continued, "The audience has to be reminded that these calls are dangerous and sometimes people don't make it. We thought, what if we killed off Otis and he dies heroically? We realized there was so much emotional landscape we could cover." Haas spoke with Chicago creator Dick Wolf about the decision first, before informing Sardarov that he was being written out. Sardarov agreed to return for the eighth-season premiere. Haas confirmed that he considered killing off Darren Ritter (Daniel Kyri), but as he was only introduced in the seventh season, his death would not have the same impact as an original cast member. Otis' death also gave the writers the chance to script a memorial at the firehouse which had not been done in the series before. Haas hoped that Sardarov would agree to reprise the role for future appearances.

Another ongoing storyline follows Paramedic Sylvie Brett (Kara Killmer), who has left Chicago with her fiancé Kyle Sheffield (Teddy Sears) for a small town in Indiana. Haas wanted "to follow through with her agreeing to marry Kyle." He also wanted to bring back her former friend Hope Jacquinot (Eloise Mumford) for the storyline.

Actor Alberto Rosende joins the cast in the recurring role of firefighter Blake Gallo. Haas said the show needed "fresh energy" and called the character a "junior Casey/junior Severide". He added that not everyone in the house is keen on bringing Blake in. On December 13, 2019 it was announced that Rosende was upped to a series regular.

On October 30, 2019, it was announced that former main cast member Monica Raymund would be returning as Gabriela Dawson for the mid-season finale in episode 9, “Best Friend Magic,” on November 20, 2019.

On April 16, 2020, it was announced that Annie Ilonzeh, who plays Emily Foster has left the series after two seasons.

=== Crossover ===
The fourth episode of the season begins a crossover event with Chicago Med and Chicago P.D.. Derek Haas and Dick Wolf wrote the story for all three parts and Haas wrote the teleplay for part one. The plot revolves around "a mysterious illness". Another crossover with P.D. aired on February 26 and included the return of Brian Geraghty as Sean Roman.

== Ratings ==
Viewership and ratings per episode of Chicago Fire season 8
No.	Title	Air date	Rating/share (18–49)	Viewers (millions)	DVR (18–49)	DVR viewers (millions)	Total (18–49)	Total viewers (millions)
1	"Sacred Ground"	September 25, 2019	1.1/5	7.32	0.8	3.99	2.0	11.32
2	"A Real Shot in the Arm"	October 2, 2019	1.1/5	7.64	0.7	3.45	1.8	11.10
3	"Badlands"	October 9, 2019	1.2/6	7.70	0.7	3.46	1.9	11.17
4	"Infection: Part I"	October 16, 2019	1.3/7	8.23	0.6	3.21	2.0	11.45
5	"Buckle Up"	October 23, 2019	1.2/6	7.87	0.6	3.35	1.9	11.22
6	"What Went Wrong"	October 30, 2019	1.2/5	7.45	0.6	3.29	1.8	10.75
7	"Welcome to Crazytown"	November 6, 2019	1.1/5	7.68	0.7	3.50	1.8	11.19
8	"Seeing Is Believing"	November 13, 2019	1.1/5	7.17	0.7	3.54	1.8	10.72
9	"Best Friend Magic"	November 20, 2019	1.2/6	8.36	0.6	3.32	1.8	11.69
10	"Hold Our Ground"	January 8, 2020	1.1/6	7.95	0.7	3.69	1.8	11.65
11	"Where We End Up"	January 15, 2020	1.2/6	8.17	0.7	3.60	1.9	11.78
12	"Then Nick Porter Happened"	January 22, 2020	1.1/5	8.18	0.7	3.63	1.8	11.78
13	"A Chicago Welcome"	February 5, 2020	1.1	8.18	0.7	3.46	1.8	11.65
14	"Shut It Down"	February 12, 2020	1.1	8.28	0.7	3.61	1.9	11.90
15	"Off the Grid"	February 26, 2020	1.2	8.66	0.8	4.06	2.1	12.73
16	"The Tendency of a Drowning Victim"	March 4, 2020	1.1	8.26	0.7	3.33	1.8	11.60
17	"Protect a Child"	March 18, 2020	1.3	9.02	0.8	3.53	2.1	12.55
18	"I'll Cover You"	March 25, 2020	1.3	9.20	0.7	3.31	2.0	12.52
19	"Light Things Up"	April 8, 2020	1.2	8.99	0.8	3.45	2.0	12.42
20	"51's Original Bell"	April 15, 2020	1.2	9.46	0.7	3.19	1.9	12.65
