= Chicago Fire season 7 =

Chicago Fire
- Season 7
- Chicago Fire Season 7 DVD cover
- Showrunner: Derek Haas
- No. of episodes: 22

Release
- Original network: NBC
- Original release: September 26, 2018 – May 22, 2019

Season chronology
- ← Previous; Season 6 Next → Season 8

The seventh season of Chicago Fire, an American drama television series from executive producer Dick Wolf and producers Derek Haas and Matt Olmstead, was ordered on May 9, 2018, by NBC. The season premiered on September 26, 2018, with a timeslot change from Thursday at 10:00 p.m. to Wednesday at 9:00 p.m. The season concluded on May 22, 2019, and contained 22 episodes.

== Cast and characters ==
=== Main cast ===
- Jesse Spencer as Captain Matthew Casey, Truck 81
- Taylor Kinney as Lieutenant Kelly Severide, Squad 3
- Kara Killmer as Paramedic in Charge Sylvie Brett, Ambulance 61
- David Eigenberg as Firefighter, later Lieutenant, Christopher Herrmann, Truck 81/Engine 51
- Yuri Sardarov as Firefighter Brian "Otis" Zvonecek, Truck 81
- Joe Minoso as Firefighter Josef "Joe" Cruz, Squad 3
- Christian Stolte as Firefighter Randall "Mouch" McHolland, Truck 81
- Miranda Rae Mayo as Firefighter Stella Kidd, Truck 81
- Annie Ilonzeh as Paramedic Emily Foster, Ambulance 61
- Eamonn Walker as Battalion Chief Wallace Boden, Battalion 25

=== Recurring ===
- Randy Flagler as Firefighter Harold Capp, Rescue Squad 3
- Anthony Ferraris as Firefighter Tony Ferraris, Rescue Squad 3
- Daniel Kyri as Firefighter Candidate Darren Ritter, Engine 37/Engine 51
- Gary Cole as Fire Commissioner Carl Grissom.
- Kim Delaney as Jennifer Sheridan
- Melissa Ponzio as Donna Robbins-Boden
- Michael Cognata as Julian Robbins, Donna Robbins-Boden's brother and Chief Boden's brother-in-law
- Robyn Coffin as Cindy Herrmann
- Jeff Lima as Leon Cruz
- Steven Boyer as Assistant Deputy Commissioner Jerry Gorsch
- Gordon Clapp as CFD Chaplain William Orlovsky
- Teddy Sears as CFD Chaplain Kyle Sheffield
- Colin Egglesfield as Gordon Mayfield
- Jordan Belfi as Bradley Boyd
- Tye White as Tyler
- Kate Villanova as Naomi Graham
- Patrick Mulvey as Dr. James "Jim" Shaw

=== Guest stars ===
- Monica Raymund as Paramedic Gabriela Dawson (episode 1)
- Treat Williams as Retired Battalion Chief Benjamin Severide, Battalion 22 (episode 5)
- Brittany Curran as Katie Nolan (episode 7)
- Rahm Emanuel as Mayor of Chicago (episode 22)

=== Crossover characters ===
- Jason Beghe as Sergeant Henry "Hank" Voight
- Jon Seda as Detective Antonio Dawson
- Jesse Lee Soffer as Detective Jay Halstead
- Tracy Spiridakos as Detective Hailey Upton
- Marina Squerciati as Officer Kim Burgess
- LaRoyce Hawkins as Officer Kevin Atwater
- Amy Morton as Desk Sergeant Trudy Platt
- Nick Gehlfuss as Dr. Will Halstead
- Torrey DeVitto as Dr. Natalie Manning
- Colin Donnell as Dr. Connor Rhodes
- Brian Tee as Dr. Ethan Choi
- Marlyne Barrett as Maggie Lockwood
- Norma Kuhling as Dr. Ava Bekker
- S. Epatha Merkerson as Sharon Goodwin
- Louis Herthum as Pat Halstead
- Patti Murin as Dr. Nina Shore
- Lorena Diaz as Nurse Doris
- Casey Tutton as Nurse Monique Lawson

== Episodes ==
No. overall	No. in season	Title	Directed by	Written by	Original release date	Prod. code	U.S. viewers (millions)
138	1	"A Closer Eye"	Sanford Bookstaver	Derek Haas	September 26, 2018	701	8.08
Casey deals with the fallout of Dawson's trip to Puerto Rico for relief help. Meanwhile, Firehouse 51 welcomes a new paramedic, Emily Foster to the team, replacing Dawson on Ambulance 61. Boden clashes with new Assistant Deputy Commissioner Gorsch—an obvious sycophant to the new Commissioner, Grissom—when he tries to clean up the Firehouse's reputation. Later, Casey is surprised when he returns home to find Dawson there to say goodbye.
139	2	"Going to War"	Reza Tabrizi	Andrea Newman & Michael Gilvary	October 3, 2018	702	8.10
The firefighters and the paramedics of Firehouse 51 deal with a 25-story apartment fire that creates chaos. Detective Jay Halstead and Dr. Will Halstead’s father is one of the victims trapped inside. Meanwhile, the new Assistant Deputy Commissioner keeps his eye on Boden. Casey and Brett continue to deal with Dawson’s departure and Brett gets a special gift that helps her cope. Foster opens up about her past. One of the firefighters gets into trouble while trying to save another firefighter. Severide makes a daring rescue of a small boy from the upper floors. This episode begins a crossover with Chicago Med and Chicago P.D. that continues on "When to Let Go" and concludes on "Endings." It is included in the Chicago Med Season 4 and Chicago P.D. Season 6 DVD sets.
140	3	"Thirty Percent Sleight of Hand"	Eric Laneuville	Michael A. O’Shea	October 10, 2018	703	8.41
Severide gets put into a difficult situation following a call when a car drives off an overpass. Criminal charges are filed and this is classified as an attempted murder/suicide rather than an accident. Meanwhile, the Assistant Deputy Commissioner suggests a new Lieutenant to Boden for Engine 51. However, the suggested Lieutenant turns out to be his brother in law. To the dismay of the ADC, Boden ignores the suggestion and appoints Herrmann as the new Lieutenant. Cruz receives unexpected romantic attention—from a young woman he rescued from the 25-story fire. Mouch tries to reach out to a Firefighter candidate who was kicked out from his firehouse following the apartment fire. Also, Foster bonds with the firehouse. Severide discovers the truth about the overpass accident after clashing with a divorce attorney involved with the family.
141	4	"This Isn't Charity"	Batán Silva	Matt Whitney	October 17, 2018	704	7.88
Firehouse 51 deals with a call that involves a series of explosions from hand grenades. Herrmann deals with his first week as Engine 51's new Lieutenant and Mouch lends a hand to a fellow firefighter. Brett and Foster suspect that a child might be getting performance enhancing drugs at a gymnastics club and Foster accuses the mother. Stella’s old high school friend visits Chicago however, Severide believes that the friend might have feelings for Stella. Foster and Brett discover who really supplied PEDs to the injured young gymnast. Herrmann finally loses his patience with an insubordinate engine crewman.
142	5	"A Volatile Mixture"	Sanford Bookstaver	Andrea Newman	October 24, 2018	705	7.70
The firehouse responds to a fire at a trailer park. At the firehouse, Gorsch berates everyone for the smallest of things. A reporter, Naomi, asks Casey to look into the cause of the trailer fire after discovering six similar fires. Meanwhile, Boden and Gorsch hit a new low when Boden finds out that Gorsch is trying to remove him from the firehouse—based on a less-than-flattering assessment Boden wrote when he was a captain and Gorsch a firefighter candidate. Herrmann, Kidd, and Otis try to find the person responsible for posting a negative review about Molly’s on Yelp. Severide reaches out to his father for help. Meanwhile, Brett learns more about Foster.
143	6	"All the Proof"	Leslie Libman	Jamila Daniel	October 31, 2018	706	7.97
Gorsch continues to clash with Boden at the firehouse and escalates his efforts as he takes Boden’s place as Incident Commander when 51 responds to a call of a poisonous gas exposure at a hotel. After the call, Gorsch (clearly over his head as an IC) threatens various insubordination charges against the house and against Boden. Severide receives devastating news about his father. Cruz tries to teach everyone Spanish following the hotel call. Casey and Naomi continue working together when she discovered more problems with the trailer manufacturer. Foster tries to get Brett in the spirit of Halloween. Chaplain Orlovsky announces his retirement and introduces 51 to his successor, Chaplain Kyle Sheffield (Teddy Sears). Later on, Severide gets emotional after Boden reveals to him that his father did one final act of kindness. Gorsch is removed from 51 for good.
144	7	"What Will Define You"	Olivia Newman	Michael A. O'Shea	November 7, 2018	707	8.26
Severide struggles with preparing the funeral for his late father Benny and takes it out on others. Stella goes the extra mile to help find a medal that Benny earned while he was a firefighter. Meanwhile, Brett contemplates a decision to turn in a teen driver who may have caused a car accident by texting and driving. Also, Otis is reunited with Severide's half sister Katie.
145	8	"The Solution to Everything"	Mark Tinker	Michael Gilvary	November 14, 2018	708	7.29
While still grieving his father's death, Severide gets caught up in a moment and is saved while at a call. Later on, Severide turns to Foster for support after she reveals that she has also lost a parent. Meanwhile, Casey and Naomi reunite on the same trailer park fire which later turns out to be intentional. Also, Herrmann, Mouch and Otis look into finding a firefighter calendar from 1990 with Boden in it.
146	9	"Always a Catch"	Reza Tabrizi	Derek Haas	December 5, 2018	709	7.94
51 responds to a call of a major highway car pileup, and Cruz discovers that his girlfriend Chloe is among the victims. Meanwhile, Casey grows closer to Naomi as they continue the trailer home story. Foster contemplates an offer to return to medical school, but ultimately decides to stay with 51. Also, Severide's jealousy of Stella's friend puts a strain on their relationship. At the end of the episode, while Casey and Naomi are sleeping, he is woken up to find his apartment on fire leaving their lives hanging in the balance.
147	10	"Inside These Walls"	Jono Oliver	Matt Whitney	January 9, 2019	710	8.01
Casey and Naomi escape the apartment fire. Casey immediately suspects that it was arson. Meanwhile, Severide and Stella's relationship hits a breaking point when Severide takes up restoring an old boat instead of being with her. Also, Brett, Foster, Otis and Herrmann organize a fire safety demonstration for high school students, but they are later surprised to see a group of seniors instead. The firehouse responds to an accident and Severide nearly gets killed. Later, Casey and Naomi say goodbye as she is going to Zurich.
148	11	"You Choose"	Paul McCrane	Jamila Daniel	January 16, 2019	711	8.03
Severide and Stella deal with the aftermath of their breakup. Severide's boat job takes a dramatic turn when the garage the boat is stored in is set on fire and he is accused of arson. Meanwhile, Brett volunteers to help Casey find a new apartment. Foster suspects that one of her victims at a call is being overmedicated by her doctor after the victim suffers a seizure. Also, Stella trains the firehouse dog, Tuesday in a dog show.
149	12	"Make This Right"	Milena Govich	Andrea Newman	January 23, 2019	712	8.43
Casey and Severide grow suspicious following a call to a single motorcycle accident where no other vehicle is involved. Meanwhile, Mouch grows tired of Otis' old man jokes and Ritter tries to get them to make amends. Also, Foster goes on a date with a doctor. Stella, Brett and Foster try to get a dent out of the Ambulance. Later, The Firehouse responds to an art museum call where a young boy is stuck inside a piece of art.
150	13	"The Plunge"	Leslie Libman	Michael A. O'Shea	February 6, 2019	713	8.79
While responding to a call, engine 51 gets into a collision with a teen driver. The accident hits Herrmann hard as his son just started to drive. Later, Herrmann takes out his stress on his family. Meanwhile, Foster continues to get harassed by the doctor she went out with and it begins to affect her job. Also, Cruz organizes everyone to attend the polar plunge. Severide takes Casey for a night out.
151	14	"It Wasn't About Hockey"	Carl Seaton	Elizabeth Sherman & Derek Haas	February 13, 2019	714	8.43
Brett, Foster and Stella travel to Indiana for a girls getaway when they get involved in a car accident involving an overturned school bus full of student hockey players with serious injuries. Brett and Foster race against the clock to treat them with the resources they have. Meanwhile, the rest of Firehouse 51 compete against each other in the annual chili cook off.
152	15	"What I Saw"	Reza Tabrizi	Andrea Newman & Michael Gilvary	February 20, 2019	715	8.85
A string of robberies happen at apartment complexes when a firehouse lockbox containing a key goes missing. The Intelligence unit asks Cruz to go undercover at another firehouse because Hank Voight suspects that a fellow firefighter might the culprit. Meanwhile, Kidd goes on a date with one of her call victims. Cruz discovers the lockbox robbery culprit unexpectedly. Note: This episode reunites Gary Cole and Jesse Lee Soffer from The Brady Bunch Movie. This episode begins a crossover with Chicago P.D. that concludes on "Good Men". It is included in the Chicago P.D. Season 6 DVD set.
153	16	"Fault in Him"	Eric Laneuville	Matt Whitney	February 27, 2019	716	8.27
While at a suicide call Casey gets ambushed by a gunman and dodges death closely. Later on, Brett tries to get Casey to show his grief and she is met with challenges in her personal life. Commissioner Grissom comes to 51 and asks them to show their support for him as there are rumors of him getting forced out of his job due to internecine politics. Otis wins a contest however, he has to shoot a hockey puck into a goal in order to receive it. A task force observing Grissom closely gets a look at his real commitment when he joins 51 on a difficult home fire and pitches in on the rescue.
154	17	"Move a Wall"	Olivia Newman	Derek Haas	March 27, 2019	717	8.26
As Casey continues to deal with post-traumatic stress, he begins to take it out on Herrmann following a call that injures Ritter. Meanwhile, at the same call, Stella suspects that the victim might be keeping kidnapped children locked in a secret room. Herrmann’s wife Cindy redecorates the common room. Later, Stella is credited after following her instincts. Casey makes amends with Herrmann.
155	18	"No Such Thing as Bad Luck"	Jann Turner	Michael Gilvary	April 3, 2019	718	8.24
Boden is stunned to discover the woman extricated from her bathroom at a home fire is his now-divorced high school sweetheart, Jasmine. Casey and Severide suspect that the fire was intentionally set. Cruz learns he'll receive an award for helping solve the lockbox robberies—before being berated by Severide when an order is ignored during a fire call. Kidd goes searching for a mug that is a decoration at Molly’s after it goes missing. Boden is even more shocked to discover who set fire to Jasmine's home, and Severide and Kidd separately acknowledge they still have feelings for each other.
156	19	"Until the Weather Breaks"	Reza Tabrizi	Michael O'Shea	April 24, 2019	719	8.11
During a stormy night, the firefighters and paramedics rally together to search for answers about a lost child found in their turnout room. Otis grows suspicious of a man who comes to the firehouse, claiming to be a "firefighter from Detroit" but he can't seem to get his story straight. Meanwhile, Brett and Casey realize that they have feelings for each other.
157	20	"Try Like Hell"	Stephen Cragg	Matt Whitney & Jamila Daniel	May 8, 2019	720	7.74
51 responds to a call at a hair salon. Later on, the investigation of the fire leads to arson. OFI looks towards the owner as the arsonist for insurance purposes. Severide suspects that the person responsible might be the same suspect in a cold case his father was working on. Meanwhile, another firehouse suspects that 51 might have stolen their nozzle which they deny. Later on, Cruz finds the nozzle and tries to sneak it back to the other firehouse. Later, Matt talks to the Chaplain about Brett.
158	21	"The White Whale"	Joe Chappelle	Andrea Newman & Michael Gilvary	May 15, 2019	721	7.96
Severide’s investigation into the arson case takes a turn when he gets suspended from duty for insubordination. Later on, Severide discovers who the arsonist is and immediately tells 51 that she is going to blow up a church. Meanwhile, Herrmann grows suspicious of a fellow firefighters wellbeing following their retirement. Also, Brett questions her feelings towards Casey.
159	22	"I'm Not Leaving You"	Reza Tabrizi	Derek Haas	May 22, 2019	722	7.51
Severide and Kidd continue to work the arson case. Later on, she and Severide rekindle their romance. Meanwhile, After helping a woman who is pregnant, Casey begins to develop feelings towards Brett only to find out that she and Chaplain Sheffield have become engaged. Also, Herrmann teaches Ritter how to bust the chops of the other firefighters at the house. At the end of the episode, everyone's lives hang in the balance while at a massive factory fire.

== Production ==
=== Cast changes ===
On May 15, 2018, longtime cast member Monica Raymund who plays Paramedic Gabriela Dawson, announced her departure from the series citing her desire to get on with the "next chapter in life." On September 21, 2018, NBC announced that newcomer Annie Ilonzeh would join the series as a regular playing Emily Foster replacing Raymund on Ambulance 61.

== Ratings ==
Viewership and ratings per episode of Chicago Fire season 7
No.	Title	Air date	Rating/share (18–49)	Viewers (millions)	DVR (18–49)	DVR viewers (millions)	Total (18–49)	Total viewers (millions)
1	"A Closer Eye"	September 26, 2018	1.3/6	8.08	0.8	3.50	2.1	11.58
2	"Going to War"	October 3, 2018	1.3/6	8.10	0.8	3.19	2.1	11.29
3	"Thirty Percent Sleight of Hand"	October 10, 2018	1.4/6	8.41	0.7	3.43	2.1	11.84
4	"This Isn't Charity"	October 17, 2018	1.3/6	7.88	0.9	3.64	2.2	11.52
5	"A Volatile Mixture"	October 24, 2018	1.4/6	7.70	0.8	3.49	2.1	11.20
6	"All the Proof"	October 31, 2018	1.2/5	7.97	0.8	3.56	2.0	11.54
7	"What Will Define You"	November 7, 2018	1.3/6	8.26	0.9	3.50	2.1	11.75
8	"The Solution to Everything"	November 14, 2018	1.3/5	7.29	0.9	3.78	2.2	11.07
9	"Always a Catch"	December 5, 2018	1.2/5	7.94	0.9	3.63	2.1	11.57
10	"Inside These Walls"	January 9, 2019	1.2/5	8.01	0.9	3.49	2.1	11.47
11	"You Choose"	January 16, 2019	1.1/5	8.03	0.9	3.79	2.1	11.82
12	"Make This Right"	January 23, 2019	1.2/6	8.43	1.0	4.01	2.2	12.44
13	"The Plunge"	February 6, 2019	1.3/6	8.79	0.8	3.54	2.1	12.29
14	"It Wasn't About Hockey"	February 13, 2019	1.1/5	8.43	0.8	3.55	2.0	12.00
15	"What I Saw"	February 20, 2019	1.3/6	8.85	0.8	3.71	2.1	12.56
16	"Fault In Him"	February 27, 2019	1.2/6	8.27	0.9	3.56	2.0	11.83
17	"Move a Wall"	March 27, 2019	1.2/6	8.26	0.9	3.62	2.0	11.90
18	"No Such Thing as Bad Luck"	April 3, 2019	1.1/5	8.24	0.8	3.41	1.9	11.66
19	"Until the Weather Breaks"	April 24, 2019	1.1/5	8.11	0.8	3.54	1.9	11.64
20	"Try Like Hell"	May 8, 2019	1.0/4	7.74	0.7	3.32	1.7	11.06
21	"The White Whale"	May 15, 2019	1.1/5	7.96	0.7	3.41	1.8	11.37
22	"I'm Not Leaving You"	May 22, 2019	1.1/5	7.51	0.7	3.53	1.8	11.00

== Home media ==
The DVD release of season seven was released in Region 1 on August 27, 2019.

The Complete Seventh Season
Set details			Special features
22 episodes; 1,036 minutes (Region 1); 6-disc set; 1.78:1 aspect ratio; Languages: English (Dolby Digital 5.1); Subtitles: English (Region 1); French European (Region 1)			Chicago Med Season 4 Crossover Episode – "When to Let Go"; Chicago P.D. Season 6 Crossover Episodes; "Endings"; "Good Men"
Release dates			Chicago Med Season 4 Crossover Episode – "When to Let Go"; Chicago P.D. Season 6 Crossover Episodes; "Endings"; "Good Men"
United States	United Kingdom	Australia	Chicago Med Season 4 Crossover Episode – "When to Let Go"; Chicago P.D. Season 6 Crossover Episodes; "Endings"; "Good Men"
August 27, 2019			Chicago Med Season 4 Crossover Episode – "When to Let Go"; Chicago P.D. Season 6 Crossover Episodes; "Endings"; "Good Men"
