= List of Chicago Med episodes =

Chicago Med is an American medical drama that premiered on NBC on November 17, 2015. The series is focused on the emergency department of Gaffney Chicago Medical Center and on its doctors and nurses as they work to save patients' lives. In March 2024, the series was renewed for a tenth season which premiered on September 25, 2024. In May 2025, the series was renewed for an eleventh season which premiered on October 1, 2025.

As of November 18, 2026, 226 episodes of Chicago Med have aired, currently in its twelfth season.

== Series overview ==
Season	Episodes	Originally released		Rank	Average viewers (million)
Season	Episodes	First released	Last released	Rank	Average viewers (million)
Pilot		April 7, 2015		—N/a	8.43
1	18	November 17, 2015	May 17, 2016	37	9.83
2	23	September 22, 2016	May 11, 2017	28	9.47
3	20	November 21, 2017	May 15, 2018	27	10.10
4	22	September 26, 2018	May 22, 2019	15	11.04
5	20	September 25, 2019	April 15, 2020	12	11.22
6	16	November 11, 2020	May 26, 2021	9	9.74
7	22	September 22, 2021	May 25, 2022	11	9.11
8	22	September 21, 2022	May 24, 2023	10	8.46
9	13	January 17, 2024	May 22, 2024	11	8.07
10	22	September 25, 2024	May 21, 2025	17	9.50
11	21	October 1, 2025	May 13, 2026	16	9.20
12	21	October 7, 2026	TBA	TBA	TBA

== Episodes ==
=== Backdoor pilot (2015) ===
No. overall	No. in season	Title	Directed by	Written by	Original release date	Prod. code	U.S. viewers (millions)
65	19	"I Am the Apocalypse"	Joe Chappelle	Story by : Dick Wolf & Matt Olmstead; Teleplay by : Michael Brandt & Derek Haas	April 7, 2015	319	8.43

=== Season 1 (2015–16) ===
No. overall	No. in season	Title	Directed by	Written by	Original release date	Prod. code	U.S. viewers (millions)
1	1	"Derailed"	Michael Waxman	Story by : Andrew Dettmann; Teleplay by : Andrew Dettmann & Diane Frolov & Andrew Schneider	November 17, 2015	101	8.64
2	2	"iNO"	Fred Berner	Stephen Hootstein	November 24, 2015	102	7.61
3	3	"Fallback"	Tara Nicole Weyr	Simran Baidwan	December 1, 2015	103	9.87
4	4	"Mistaken"	Donald Petrie	Eli Talbert	December 8, 2015	104	9.60
5	5	"Malignant"	Nick Gomez	Jeff Drayer	January 5, 2016	105	8.39
6	6	"Bound"	Michael Waxman	Will Pascoe	January 19, 2016	106	7.05
7	7	"Saints"	Jann Turner	Mary Leah Sutton	January 26, 2016	107	7.58
8	8	"Reunion"	Donald Petrie	Story by : David Weinstein; Teleplay by : David Weinstein & Stephen Hootstein	February 2, 2016	108	7.54
9	9	"Choices"	Jean de Segonzac	Joshua Hale Fialkov	February 9, 2016	109	7.02
10	10	"Clarity"	Fred Berner	Safura Fadavi	February 16, 2016	110	6.66
11	11	"Intervention"	Sanford Bookstaver	Story by : Jeff Drayer & Simran Baidwan; Teleplay by : Jeff Drayer & Simran Baidwan & Diane Frolov & Andrew Schneider	February 23, 2016	111	6.64
12	12	"Guilty"	Holly Dale	Mary Leah Sutton & Danny Weiss & Stephen Hootstein	March 29, 2016	112	8.68
13	13	"Us"	Michael Waxman	Diane Frolov & Andrew Schneider & Jeff Drayer	April 5, 2016	113	7.23
14	14	"Hearts"	Donald Petrie	Liz Brixius	April 19, 2016	114	8.16
15	15	"Inheritance"	Stephen Cragg	Joseph Sousa	April 26, 2016	115	9.00
16	16	"Disorder"	Ami Mann	Eli Talbert	May 3, 2016	116	7.62
17	17	"Withdrawal"	Fred Berner	Jeff Drayer & Stephen Hootstein	May 10, 2016	117	8.01
18	18	"Timing"	Michael Waxman	Diane Frolov & Andrew Schneider	May 17, 2016	118	7.86

=== Season 2 (2016–17) ===
No. overall	No. in season	Title	Directed by	Written by	Original release date	Prod. code	U.S. viewers (millions)
19	1	"Soul Care"	Arthur W. Forney	Diane Frolov & Andrew Schneider	September 22, 2016	201	7.02
20	2	"Win Loss"	David Rodriguez	Eli Talbert & Safura Fadavi	September 29, 2016	203	6.79
21	3	"Natural History"	Michael Waxman	Stephen Hootstein & Danny Weiss	October 6, 2016	202	6.99
22	4	"Brother's Keeper"	Stephen Cragg	Jeff Drayer & Joseph Sousa	October 13, 2016	204	6.83
23	5	"Extreme Measures"	Daisy von Scherler Mayer	Shelley Meals & Darin Goldberg	October 20, 2016	205	6.70
24	6	"Alternative Medicine"	Eriq La Salle	Diane Frolov & Andrew Schneider	October 27, 2016	206	7.11
25	7	"Inherent Bias"	Michael Waxman	Stephen Hootstein & Danny Weiss	November 3, 2016	207	6.83
26	8	"Free Will"	Charles S. Carroll	Jeff Drayer & Joseph Sousa	November 10, 2016	208	6.71
27	9	"Uncharted Territory"	Patrick Norris	Eli Talbert & Safura Fadavi	January 5, 2017	209	6.23
28	10	"Heart Matters"	Fred Berner	Darin Goldberg & Shelley Meals	January 12, 2017	210	6.87
29	11	"Graveyard Shift"	Alex Zakrzewski	Diane Frolov & Andrew Schneider	January 19, 2017	211	6.41
30	12	"Mirror Mirror"	Vincent Misiano	Stephen Hootstein	February 2, 2017	212	6.30
31	13	"Theseus' Ship"	Kenneth Johnson	Jeff Drayer	February 9, 2017	213	6.07
32	14	"Cold Front"	Michael Waxman	Diane Frolov & Andrew Schneider & Danny Weiss	February 16, 2017	214	6.10
33	15	"Lose Yourself"	David Rodriguez	Eli Talbert	March 2, 2017	215	8.82
34	16	"Prisoner's Dilemma"	Laura Belsey	Joseph Sousa	March 9, 2017	216	6.29
35	17	"Monday Mourning"	Fred Berner	Story by : Jeff Drayer & Danny Weiss & Paul R. Puri; Teleplay by : Jeff Drayer & Danny Weiss	March 16, 2017	217	7.35
36	18	"Lesson Learned"	Michael Pressman	Safura Fadavi	March 30, 2017	218	6.01
37	19	"Ctrl Alt"	Valerie Weiss	Story by : Stephen Hootstein & Jason Cho; Teleplay by : Stephen Hootstein	April 6, 2017	219	5.98
38	20	"Generation Gap"	Stephen Cragg	Shelley Meals & Darin Goldberg	April 13, 2017	220	6.16
39	21	"Deliver Us"	Holly Dale	Jeff Drayer & Joseph Sousa	April 27, 2017	221	6.04
40	22	"White Butterflies"	Eriq La Salle	Stephen Hootstein & Eli Talbert	May 4, 2017	222	6.40
41	23	"Love Hurts"	Michael Waxman	Story by : Diane Frolov & Andrew Schneider & Gabriel L. Feinberg; Teleplay by : Diane Frolov & Andrew Schneider	May 11, 2017	223	7.01

=== Season 3 (2017–18) ===
No. overall	No. in season	Title	Directed by	Written by	Original release date	Prod. code	U.S. viewers (millions)
42	1	"Speak Your Truth"	Michael Waxman	Diane Frolov & Andrew Schneider & Stephen Hootstein & Danny Weiss	November 21, 2017	301	6.19
43	2	"Nothing to Fear"	Charles S. Carroll	Jeff Drayer & Joseph Sousa	November 28, 2017	302	7.86
44	3	"Trust Your Gut"	Mark Tinker	Eli Talbert & Safura Fadavi	December 5, 2017	303	6.62
45	4	"Naughty or Nice"	Daisy Von Scherler Mayer	Daniel Sinclair & Danny Weiss	December 12, 2017	304	6.20
46	5	"Mountains and Molehills"	Michael Waxman	Stephen Hootstein & Meridith Friedman	January 2, 2018	305	6.96
47	6	"Ties That Bind"	Valerie Weiss	Diane Frolov & Andrew Schneider & Gabriel L. Feinberg	January 9, 2018	306	6.92
48	7	"Over Troubled Water"	Leon Ichaso	Jeff Drayer & Jason Cho	January 16, 2018	307	7.88
49	8	"Lemons and Lemonade"	Jono Oliver	Eli Talbert & Paul R. Puri	January 23, 2018	308	6.85
50	9	"On Shaky Ground"	Donald Petrie	Joseph Sousa & Danny Weiss	February 6, 2018	309	7.36
51	10	"Down by Law"	Michael Waxman	Stephen Hootstein & Safura Fadavi	February 27, 2018	310	7.27
52	11	"Folie à Deux"	David Rodriguez	Diane Frolov & Andrew Schneider	March 6, 2018	311	7.03
53	12	"Born This Way"	Lin Oeding	Jeff Drayer & Daniel Sinclair	March 20, 2018	312	6.89
54	13	"Best Laid Plans"	Fred Berner	Eli Talbert & Meridith Friedman	March 27, 2018	313	5.81
55	14	"Lock It Down"	Salli Richardson-Whitfield	Diane Frolov & Andrew Schneider & Danny Weiss	April 3, 2018	314	6.19
56	15	"Devil in Disguise"	Michael Pressman	Stephen Hootstein & Joseph Sousa	April 10, 2018	315	6.51
57	16	"An Inconvenient Truth"	Charles Carroll	Safura Fadavi & Meridith Friedman	April 17, 2018	316	6.31
58	17	"The Parent Trap"	Jono Oliver	Jeff Drayer	April 24, 2018	317	6.15
59	18	"This Is Now"	Charles Carroll	Eli Talbert & Daniel Sinclair	May 1, 2018	318	5.84
60	19	"Crisis of Confidence"	Martha Mitchell	Stephen Hootstein & Danny Weiss	May 8, 2018	319	5.85
61	20	"The Tipping Point"	Michael Waxman	Diane Frolov & Andrew Schneider	May 15, 2018	320	5.62

=== Season 4 (2018–19) ===
No. overall	No. in season	Title	Directed by	Written by	Original release date	Prod. code	U.S. viewers (millions)
62	1	"Be My Better Half"	Michael Waxman	Diane Frolov & Andrew Schneider	September 26, 2018	401	7.78
63	2	"When to Let Go"	Charles S. Carroll	Diane Frolov & Andrew Schneider & Danny Weiss	October 3, 2018	402	8.83
64	3	"Heavy Is the Head"	Michael Waxman	Jeff Drayer	October 10, 2018	403	8.15
65	4	"Backed Against the Wall"	Vincent Misiano	Eli Talbert	October 17, 2018	404	7.71
66	5	"What You Don't Know"	Donald Petrie	Stephen Hootstein	October 24, 2018	405	7.68
67	6	"Lesser of Two Evils"	Martha Mitchell	Safura Fadavi & Meridith Friedman	October 31, 2018	406	7.77
68	7	"The Poison Inside Us"	Milena Govich	Jeff Drayer & Joseph Sousa	November 7, 2018	407	8.42
69	8	"Play by My Rules"	Valerie Weiss	Eli Talbert & Daniel Sinclair	November 14, 2018	408	7.53
70	9	"Death Do Us Part"	Fred Berner	Stephen Hootstein & Paul R. Puri	December 5, 2018	409	7.91
71	10	"All the Lonely People"	Michael Waxman	Diane Frolov & Andrew Schneider	January 9, 2019	410	8.54
72	11	"Who Can You Trust"	Charles S. Carroll	Story by : Meridith Friedman; Teleplay by : Safura Fadavi & Meridith Friedman	January 16, 2019	411	8.51
73	12	"The Things We Do"	Carl Seaton	Jeff Drayer & Danny Weiss	January 23, 2019	412	9.41
74	13	"Ghosts in the Attic"	Michael Pressman	Story by : Stephen Hootstein & Joseph Sousa; Teleplay by : Stephen Hootstein & Joseph Sousa & Jason Cho	February 6, 2019	413	9.37
75	14	"Can't Unring That Bell"	Lin Oeding	Diane Frolov & Andrew Schneider and Daniel Sinclair	February 13, 2019	414	8.73
76	15	"We Hold These Truths"	Nicole Rubio	Eli Talbert & Paul R. Puri	February 20, 2019	415	9.11
77	16	"Old Flames, New Sparks"	Elodie Keene	Story by : Safura Fadavi; Teleplay by : Safura Fadavi & Meridith Friedman	February 27, 2019	416	8.48
78	17	"The Space Between Us"	Daniela De Carlo	Story by : Danny Weiss & Ryan Michael Johnson; Teleplay by : Danny Weiss & Jeff Drayer	March 27, 2019	417	8.08
79	18	"Tell Me the Truth"	Vincent Misiano	Story by : Diane Frolov & Andrew Schneider; Teleplay by : Andrew Schneider & Gabriel L. Feinberg	April 3, 2019	418	7.96
80	19	"Never Let You Go"	Charles S. Carroll	Stephen Hootstein & Joseph Sousa	April 24, 2019	419	7.89
81	20	"More Harm Than Good"	Milena Govich	Story by : Daniel Sinclair; Teleplay by : Eli Talbert & Daniel Sinclair	May 8, 2019	420	7.80
82	21	"Forever Hold Your Peace"	Charles S. Carroll	Safura Fadavi & Meridith Friedman	May 15, 2019	421	7.98
83	22	"With a Brave Heart"	Michael Waxman	Diane Frolov & Andrew Schneider	May 22, 2019	422	7.55

=== Season 5 (2019–20) ===
No. overall	No. in season	Title	Directed by	Written by	Original release date	Prod. code	U.S. viewers (millions)
84	1	"Never Going Back to Normal"	Michael Pressman	Diane Frolov & Andrew Schneider	September 25, 2019	501	7.53
85	2	"We're Lost in the Dark"	Alex Chapple	Jeff Drayer	October 2, 2019	502	7.67
86	3	"In the Valley of the Shadows"	Charles S. Carroll	Stephen Hootstein	October 9, 2019	503	7.47
87	4	"Infection: Part II"	Michael Pressman	Teleplay by : Diane Frolov & Andrew Schneider; Story by : Dick Wolf & Derek Haas	October 16, 2019	504	8.93
88	5	"Got a Friend in Me"	John Polson	Eli Talbert	October 23, 2019	505	7.84
89	6	"It's All in the Family"	Nicole Rubio	Safura Fadavi & Meridith Friedman	October 30, 2019	506	7.95
90	7	"Who Knows What Tomorrow Brings"	Jerry Levine	Daniel Sinclair & Paul R. Puri	November 6, 2019	507	8.09
91	8	"Too Close to the Sun"	Michael Berry	Joseph Sousa & Danny Weiss	November 13, 2019	508	7.43
92	9	"I Can’t Imagine the Future"	Charles S. Carroll	Diane Frolov & Andrew Schneider	November 20, 2019	509	8.43
93	10	"Guess It Doesn't Matter Anymore"	Mykelti Williamson	Stephen Hootstein & Gabriel L. Feinberg	January 8, 2020	510	7.46
94	11	"The Ground Shifts Beneath Us"	Martha Mitchell	Safura Fadavi & Meridith Friedman	January 15, 2020	511	8.45
95	12	"Leave the Choice to Solomon"	Milena Govich	Jeff Drayer	January 22, 2020	512	8.44
96	13	"Pain Is for the Living"	Vincent Misiano	Eli Talbert	February 5, 2020	513	8.66
97	14	"It May Not Be Forever"	Elodie Keene	Daniel Sinclair & Paul R. Puri	February 12, 2020	514	8.17
98	15	"I Will Do No Harm"	Vanessa Parise	Joseph Sousa & Danny Weiss	February 26, 2020	515	8.61
99	16	"Who Should Be the Judge"	Alex Chapple	Safura Fadavi	March 4, 2020	516	8.31
100	17	"The Ghosts of the Past"	Michael Waxman	Diane Frolov & Andrew Schneider	March 18, 2020	517	9.17
101	18	"In the Name of Love"	S. J. Main Muñoz	Meridith Friedman	March 25, 2020	518	9.60
102	19	"Just a River in Egypt"	Jean de Segonzac	Jeff Drayer	April 8, 2020	519	9.07
103	20	"A Needle in the Heart"	Milena Govich	Stephen Hootstein & Daniel Sinclair	April 15, 2020	520	9.33

=== Season 6 (2020–21) ===
No. overall	No. in season	Title	Directed by	Written by	Original release date	Prod. code	U.S. viewers (millions)
104	1	"When Did We Begin to Change?"	Michael Pressman	Diane Frolov & Andrew Schneider	November 11, 2020	601	7.83
105	2	"Those Things Hidden in Plain Sight"	John Polson	Stephen Hootstein & Daniel Sinclair	November 18, 2020	602	7.87
106	3	"Do You Know the Way Home?"	Mykelti Williamson	Jeff Drayer & Gabriel L. Feinberg	January 13, 2021 (Note: This episode was originally scheduled to air on January 6, 2021, in the United States and Canada. In the United States it was preempted as a result of the January 6 United States Capitol attack, however the episode still partially aired on its originally scheduled air date for Canada's east coast on CityTV before being switched for a re-run of episode 2.)	603	7.62
107	4	"In Search of Forgiveness, Not Permission"	Milena Govich	Eli Talbert & Paul R. Puri	January 27, 2021 (Note: This episode was originally scheduled to air on January 13, 2021, in the United States and Canada, but was replaced in the United States by "Do You Know the Way Home?", which was postponed from the previous Wednesday.)	604	7.20
108	5	"When Your Heart Rules Your Head"	Mykelti Williamson	Safura Fadavi & Meridith Friedman	February 3, 2021 (Note: This episode was originally scheduled to air on January 20, 2021, in the United States and Canada, but was preempted in the United States for news coverage of the inauguration of Joe Biden.)	605	7.48
109	6	"Don't Want to Face This Now"	Milena Govich	Melissa R. Byer & Treena Hancock	February 10, 2021	606	7.29
110	7	"Better Is the Enemy of Good"	Charles S. Carroll	Diane Frolov & Andrew Schneider	February 17, 2021	607	7.59
111	8	"Fathers and Mothers, Daughters and Sons"	John Polson	Safura Fadavi & Meridith Friedman	March 10, 2021	608	7.57
112	9	"For the Want of A Nail"	S. J. Main Muñoz	Stephen Hootstein & Daniel Sinclair	March 17, 2021	609	7.09
113	10	"So Many Things We've Kept Buried"	Martha Mitchell	Jeff Drayer & Paul R. Puri	March 31, 2021	610	7.24
114	11	"Letting Go Only to Come Together"	S. J. Main Muñoz	Eli Talbert & Gabriel L. Feinberg	April 7, 2021	611	6.88
115	12	"Some Things Are Worth the Risk"	Carl Weathers	Melissa R. Byer & Treena Hancock	April 21, 2021	612	7.15
116	13	"What A Tangled Web We Weave"	Bethany Rooney	Teleplay by : Safura Fadavi & Meridith Friedman; Story by : Safura Fadavi & Ryan Michael Johnson	May 5, 2021 (Note: This episode was originally scheduled to air on April 28, 2021, in the United States and Canada, but was replaced in the United States by a rerun of "Fathers and Mothers, Daughters and Sons", due to President Joe Biden's presidential address to the joint session of Congress.)	613	7.09
117	14	"A Red Pill, a Blue Pill"	Michael Berry	Stephen Hootstein & Daniel Sinclair	May 12, 2021	614	7.06
118	15	"Stories, Secrets, Half-Truths and Lies"	Michael Waxman	Jeff Drayer	May 19, 2021	615	6.62
119	16	"I Will Come to Save You"	Michael Pressman	Diane Frolov & Andrew Schneider	May 26, 2021	616	7.26

=== Season 7 (2021–22) ===
No. overall	No. in season	Title	Directed by	Written by	Original release date	Prod. code	U.S. viewers (millions)
120	1	"You Can't Always Trust What You See"	Nicole Rubio	Diane Frolov & Andrew Schneider	September 22, 2021	701	6.81
121	2	"To Lean In or To Let Go"	Oz Scott	Safura Fadavi	September 29, 2021	702	6.71
122	3	"Be the Change You Want to See"	Mykelti Williamson	Meridith Friedman	October 6, 2021	703	7.02
123	4	"Status Quo (The Mess We're In)"	Milena Govich	Eli Talbert	October 13, 2021	704	6.94
124	5	"Change Is a Tough Pill to Swallow"	Nicole Rubio	Jeff Drayer & Natalie Drayer	October 20, 2021	705	6.77
125	6	"When You're a Hammer Everything's a Nail"	Charles S. Carroll	Daniel Sinclair	October 27, 2021	706	6.80
126	7	"A Square Peg in a Round Hole"	Timothy Busfield	Stephen Hootstein & Gabriel L. Feinberg	November 3, 2021	707	6.67
127	8	"Just as a Snake Sheds Its Skin"	Michael Berry	Safura Fadavi & Meridith Friedman	November 10, 2021	708	6.46
128	9	"Secret Santa Has a Gift for You"	Nicole Rubio	Diane Frolov & Andrew Schneider	December 8, 2021	709	6.59
129	10	"No Good Deed Goes Unpunished... in Chicago"	Michael Pressman	Eli Talbert & Ryan Michael Johnson	January 5, 2022	710	6.94
130	11	"The Things We Thought We Left Behind"	S. J. Main Muñoz	Jeff Drayer & Natalie Drayer	January 12, 2022	711	7.33
131	12	"What You Don't Know Can't Hurt You"	Tess Malone	Stephen Hootstein & Daniel Sinclair	January 19, 2022	712	7.45
132	13	"Reality Leaves a Lot to the Imagination"	X. Dean Lim	Teleplay by : Meridith Friedman; Story by : Meridith Friedman & Lily Dahl	February 23, 2022	713	7.13
133	14	"All the Things That Could Have Been"	Jonathan Brown	Diane Frolov & Andrew Schneider & Conor Patrick Hogan	March 2, 2022	714	7.05
134	15	"Things Meant to Be Bent Not Broken"	Afia Nathaniel	Stephen Hootstein & Gabriel L. Feinberg	March 9, 2022	715	7.05
135	16	"May Your Choices Reflect Hope, Not Fear"	Tess Malone	Teleplay by : Eli Talbert & Ryan Michael Johnson; Story by : Eli Talbert & Mrittika "Mou" Sarin	March 16, 2022	716	6.35
136	17	"If You Love Someone, Set Them Free"	Bethany Rooney	Jeff Drayer & Natalie Drayer	April 6, 2022	717	6.61
137	18	"Judge Not, For You Will Be Judged"	Nicole Rubio	Safura Fadavi & Meridith Friedman	April 13, 2022	718	6.86
138	19	"Like a Phoenix Rising from the Ashes"	Timothy Busfield	Stephen Hootstein & Daniel Sinclair	April 20, 2022	719	6.66
139	20	"End of the Day, Anything Can Happen"	Daniel Willis	Eli Talbert & Gabriel L. Feinberg	May 11, 2022	720	6.37
140	21	"Lying Doesn't Protect You from the Truth"	Michael Pressman	Jeff Drayer & Natalie Drayer	May 18, 2022	721	6.24
141	22	"And Now We Come to the End"	Nicole Rubio	Teleplay by : Diane Frolov & Andrew Schneider & Meridith Friedman; Story by : Meridith Friedman & Lily Dahl	May 25, 2022	722	6.43

=== Season 8 (2022–23) ===
No. overall	No. in season	Title	Directed by	Written by	Original release date	Prod. code	U.S. viewers (millions)
142	1	"How Do You Begin to Count the Losses"	Michael Pressman	Diane Frolov & Andrew Schneider	September 21, 2022	801	6.59
143	2	"(Caught Between) The Wrecking Ball and the Butterfly"	Nicole Rubio	Teleplay by : Stephen Hootstein; Story by : Stephen Hootstein & Danny Weiss	September 28, 2022	802	6.49
144	3	"Winning the Battle, but Still Losing the War"	Charles Carroll	Teleplay by : Meridith Friedman & Ryan Michael Johnson; Story by : Meridith Friedman & Gabrielle Fulton Ponder	October 5, 2022	803	6.75
145	4	"The Apple Doesn't Fall Far from the Teacher"	Nicole Rubio	Daniel Sinclair	October 12, 2022	804	6.58
146	5	"Yep, This is the World We Live In"	X. Dean Lim	Eli Talbert	October 19, 2022	805	6.88
147	6	"Mamma Said There Would Be Days Like This"	Tim Busfield	Gabriel L. Feinberg & Lily Dahl	November 2, 2022	806	6.58
148	7	"The Clothes Make the Man... Or Do They?"	Anthony Nardolillo	Stephen Hootstein & Danny Weiss	November 9, 2022	807	5.98
149	8	"Everyone's Fighting a Battle You Know Nothing About"	Jonathan Brown	Meridith Friedman & Gabrielle Fulton Ponder	November 16, 2022	808	6.73
150	9	"This Could Be the Start of Something New"	Nicole Rubio	Diane Frolov & Andrew Schneider	December 7, 2022	809	6.64
151	10	"A Little Change Might Do You Some Good"	Bethany Rooney	Daniel Sinclair & Ryan Michael Johnson	January 4, 2023	810	6.76
152	11	"It Is What It Is, Until It Isn't"	Benny Boom	Teleplay by : Eli Talbert; Story by : Conor Patrick Hogan	January 11, 2023	811	6.80
153	12	"We All Know What They Say About Assumptions"	Carl Weathers	Gabriel L. Feinberg & Lily Dahl	January 18, 2023	812	6.95
154	13	"It's an Ill Wind That Blows Nobody Good"	Afia Nathaniel	Stephen Hootstein & Danny Weiss	February 15, 2023	813	6.74
155	14	"On Days Like Today... Silver Linings Become Lifelines"	Nicole Rubio	Meridith Friedman & Gabrielle Fulton Ponder	February 22, 2023	814	6.52
156	15	"Those Times You Have to Cross the Line"	Milena Govich	Daniel Sinclair & Ryan Michael Johnson	March 1, 2023	815	6.57
157	16	"What You See Isn't Always What You Get"	Tim Busfield	Eli Talbert & Danny Weiss	March 22, 2023	816	6.60
158	17	"Know When to Hold and When to Fold"	Brian Tee	Gabriel L. Feinberg & Lily Dahl	March 29, 2023	817	6.57
159	18	"I Could See the Writing on the Wall"	Oz Scott	Meridith Friedman & Gabrielle Fulton Ponder	April 5, 2023	818	6.40
160	19	"Look Closely and You Might Hear the Truth"	Tess Malone	Stephen Hootstein & Daniel Sinclair	May 3, 2023	819	5.85
161	20	"The Winds of Change Are Starting to Blow"	Nikki Taylor-Roberts	Eli Talbert & Danny Weiss	May 10, 2023	820	5.45
162	21	"Might Feel Like It's Time for a Change"	Bethany Rooney	Meridith Friedman & Ryan Michael Johnson	May 17, 2023	821	5.61
163	22	"Does One Door Close and Another One Open?"	Nicole Rubio	Diane Frolov & Andrew Schneider	May 24, 2023	822	5.55

=== Season 9 (2024) ===
No. overall	No. in season	Title	Directed by	Written by	Original release date	Prod. code	U.S. viewers (millions)
164	1	"Row, Row, Row Your Boat On a Rocky Sea"	Anna Dokoza	Diane Frolov & Andrew Schneider	January 17, 2024	901	6.93
165	2	"This Town Ain't Big Enough for Both of Us"	Tess Malone	Teleplay by : Stephen Hootstein; Story by : Stephen Hootstein & Danny Weiss	January 24, 2024	902	6.61
166	3	"What Happens in the Dark Always Comes to Light"	Anthony Nardolillo	Meridith Friedman	January 31, 2024	903	6.62
167	4	"These Are Not the Droids You Are Looking For"	Sharon Lewis	Eli Talbert	February 7, 2024	904	6.45
168	5	"I Make a Promise, I Will Never Leave You"	Anna Dokoza	Diane Frolov & Andrew Schneider	February 21, 2024	905	6.30
169	6	"I Told Myself That I Was Done With You"	Michael Pressman	Gabriel L. Feinberg & Ryan Michael Johnson	February 28, 2024	906	6.37
170	7	"Step on a Crack and Break Your Mother's Back"	Gonzalo Amat	Danny Weiss & Lily Dahl	March 20, 2024	907	6.32
171	8	"A Penny for Your Thoughts, Dollar for Your Dreams"	Joanna Kerns	Teleplay by : Stephen Hootstein; Story by : Stephen Hootstein & Eli Jarmel	March 27, 2024	908	6.03
172	9	"Spin A Yarn, Get Stuck In Your Own String"	Anna Dokoza	Teleplay by : Meridith Friedman; Story by : Meridith Friedman & Ashley Bower	April 3, 2024	909	6.36
173	10	"You Might Just Find You Get What You Need"	Bethany Rooney	Eli Talbert	May 1, 2024	910	5.61
174	11	"I Think There is Something You're Not Telling Me"	Brian Tee	Gabriel L. Feinberg & Ryan Michael Johnson	May 8, 2024	911	5.65
175	12	"Get By With a Little Help From My Friends"	Jonathan Brown	Danny Weiss & Lily Dahl	May 15, 2024	912	5.49
176	13	"I Think I Know You, but Do I Really?"	Anna Dokoza	Diane Frolov & Andrew Schneider	May 22, 2024	913	5.49

=== Season 10 (2024–25) ===
No. overall	No. in season	Title	Directed by	Written by	Original release date	Prod. code	U.S. viewers (millions)
177	1	"Sink Or Swim"	Anna Dokoza	Allen MacDonald	September 25, 2024	1001	5.46
178	2	"Bite Your Tongue"	Anthony Nardolillo	Stephen Hootstein	October 2, 2024	1002	5.52
179	3	"Trust Fall"	Tess Malone	Lauren MacKenzie & Andrew Gettens	October 9, 2024	1003	5.33
180	4	"Blurred Lines"	Gonzalo Amat	Meridith Friedman	October 16, 2024	1004	5.44
181	5	"Bad Habits"	Anna Dokoza	Danny Weiss	October 23, 2024	1005	6.05
182	6	"Forget Me Not"	Michael Pressman	Lauren Glover	November 6, 2024	1006	6.01
183	7	"Family Matters"	Bethany Rooney	Ryan Michael Johnson	November 13, 2024	1007	5.98
184	8	"Love Will Tear Us Apart"	Lee Friedlander	Deanna Shumaker	November 20, 2024	1008	5.86
185	9	"No Love Lost"	Cherie Nowlan	Ashley Bower & Eli Jarmel	January 8, 2025	1009	6.17
186	10	"Broken Hearts"	Edward Ornelas	Andrew Gettens & Lauren MacKenzie	January 22, 2025	1010	6.03
187	11	"In the Trenches: Part II"	Anna Dokoza	Stephen Hootstein	January 29, 2025	1011	6.55
188	12	"In The Wake"	Sharon Lewis	Meridith Friedman	February 5, 2025	1012	6.27
189	13	"Take a Look in the Mirror"	Andi Behring	Danny Weiss	February 19, 2025	1013	6.28
190	14	"Acid Test"	Brian Tee	Lauren Glover	February 26, 2025	1014	5.96
191	15	"Down in a Hole"	Anna Dokoza	Allen MacDonald	March 5, 2025	1015	5.80
192	16	"Poster Child"	Anthony Nardolillo	Conor Patrick Hogan & Dylan Johnson	March 26, 2025	1016	5.92′
193	17	"The Book of Archer"	Olenka Denysenko	Deanna Shumaker	April 2, 2025	1017	5.70
194	18	"Together One Last Time"	Joanna Kerns	Ryan Michael Johnson	April 16, 2025	1018	5.61
195	19	"The Stories We Tell Ourselves"	Tess Malone	Meridith Friedman	April 23, 2025	1019	5.38
196	20	"The Invisible Hand"	Anna Dokoza	Stephen Hootstein	May 7, 2025	1020	5.37
197	21	"Baby Mine..."	Gonzalo Amat	Lauren MacKenzie & Andrew Gettens	May 14, 2025	1021	5.17
198	22	"...Don't You Cry"	Anna Dokoza	Allen MacDonald	May 21, 2025	1022	5.81

=== Season 11 (2025–26) ===
No. overall	No. in season	Title	Directed by	Written by	Original airdate	Prod. code	U.S. viewers (millions)
199	1	"We All Fall Down"	Jonathan Brown	Allen MacDonald	October 1, 2025	1102	5.36
200	2	"A Game of Inches"	Anna Dokoza	Andrew Gettens & Lauren MacKenzie	October 8, 2025	1101	5.05
201	3	"Horseshoes and Hand Grenades"	Anthony Nardolillo	Stephen Hootstein	October 15, 2025	1103	5.66
202	4	"Found Family"	Tess Malone	Zoe Cheng	October 22, 2025	1105	5.28
203	5	"What's Hiding in the Dark"	Rashidi Harper	Meridith Friedman	October 29, 2025	1104	5.42
204	6	"The Story of Us"	Andi Behring	Deanna Shumaker	November 5, 2025	1106	5.35
205	7	"Double Down"	Anna Dokoza	Ashley Bower & Eli Jarmel	November 12, 2025	1108	5.63
206	8	"Triple Threat"	Jonathan Brown	Stephen Hootstein	January 7, 2026	1109	N/A
207	9	"Blindsided"	Cherie Nowlan	Andrew Gettens & Lauren MacKenzie	January 14, 2026	1107	N/A
208	10	"Frost on Fire"	Bethany Rooney	Meridith Friedman	January 21, 2026	1110	N/A
209	11	"Our So-Called Lives"	Elisabeth Rohm	Zoe Cheng	January 28, 2026	1111	N/A
210	12	"Spill Your Guts"	Gonzalo Amat	Conor Patrick Hogan	February 4, 2026	1112	N/A
211	13	"Reckoning, Part II"	Jonathan Brown	Meridith Friedman	March 4, 2026	1117	N/A
212	14	"Twist & Shout"	Jonathan Brown	Stephen Hootstein	March 11, 2026	1113	N/A
213	15	"The Cost of Living"	Andi Behring	Andrew Gettens & Lauren Mackenzie	March 18, 2026	1114	N/A
214	16	"The Book of Charles"	Cherie Nowlan	Allen MacDonald	April 1, 2026	1115	N/A
215	17	"Altered States"	Oscar Rene Lozoya II	Deanna Shumaker	April 8, 2026	1116	N/A
216	18	"Things Left Unsaid"	Anthony Nardolillo	Brian Yorkey	April 22, 2026	1118	N/A
217	19	"Exit Strategies"	Cory Bowles	Stephen Hootstein & Dylan Johnson	April 29, 2026	1119	N/A
218	20	"Hell Breaks Loose"	Anna Dokoza	Lauren Mackenzie & Andrew Gettens	May 6, 2026	1120	N/A
219	21	"Heaven Help Us"	Jonathan Brown	Teleplay by : Allen MacDonald & Meridith Friedman; Story by : Allen MacDonald	May 13, 2026	1121	N/A

=== Season 12 (2026) ===
No. overall	No. in season	Title	Directed by	Written by	Original airdate	Prod. code	U.S. viewers (millions)
220	1	"Shots Fired"	Anna Dokoza	Allen MacDonald	October 7, 2026	1201	5.64
221	2	"Third Rails"	Anthony Nardolillo	Andrew Gettens & Lauren Mackenzie	October 14, 2026	1202	5.65
222	3	"They Call Me Ms. Goodwin"	Tess Malone	Stephen Hootstein	October 21, 2026	1203	5.47
223	4	"Tomorrow, and Tomorrow, and Tomorrow"	Andi Behring	Meridith Friedman	October 28, 2026	1204	5.17
224	5	"Baptism by Fire"	Anna Dokoza	Zoe Cheng	November 4, 2026	1205	5.95
225	6	"Lessons in Chemistry"	Rashidi Harper	Deanna Shumaker	November 11, 2026	1206	5.98
226	7	"Borders and Battle Lines"	Victor Macias	Aurora Ferlin	November 18, 2026	TBA	TBD

== Home media ==
Season	Episodes	DVD release dates				Bonus features
Season	Episodes	Region 1	Region 2	Region 4	Discs	Bonus features
1	18	August 30, 2016	September 12, 2016	April 26, 2017	5	Chicago Fire Season 4 Crossover Episode "The Beating Heart" (Note: "The Beating Heart" and "Now I'm God" are parts one and three of the crossover that continues on "Malignant".); Chicago P.D. Season 3 Crossover Episode "Now I'm God"
2	23	August 29, 2017	September 18, 2017	November 15, 2017	6	None
3	20	August 28, 2018	September 17, 2018	March 25, 2019	5	None
4	22	August 27, 2019	November 25, 2019	August 26, 2020	6	Chicago Fire Season 7 Crossover Episode "Going to War" (Note: "Going to War" and "Endings" are parts one and three of the crossover that continues on "When to Let Go".); Chicago P.D. Season 6 Crossover Episode "Endings"
1-4	83	N/A	November 25, 2019	N/A	22	

== See also ==
- Chicago (franchise)
- List of Chicago Fire episodes
- List of Chicago P.D. episodes
- List of Chicago Justice episodes
