= Infection (Chicago franchise) =

2019 TV crossover event

- Chicago crossover event
- Promotional poster for the crossover event.
- Story by: Dick Wolf; Derek Haas
- Original air date: October 16, 2019

Part 1: Chicago Fire
- Episode title: "Infection: Part I"
- Episode no.: Season 8 Episode 4
- Directed by: Reza Tabrizi
- Teleplay by: Derek Haas

Episode chronology
← Previous "Badlands"	Next → "Buckle Up"
- Chicago Fire season 8

Part 2: Chicago Med
- Episode title: "Infection: Part II"
- Episode no.: Season 5 Episode 4
- Directed by: Michael Pressman
- Teleplay by: Diane Frolov and Andrew Schneider

Episode chronology
← Previous "In the Valley of the Shadows"	Next → "Got a Friend in Me"
- Chicago Med season 5

Part 3: Chicago P.D.
- Episode title: "Infection: Part III"
- Episode no.: Season 7 Episode 4
- Directed by: Eriq La Salle
- Teleplay by: Gwen Sigan

Episode chronology
← Previous "Familia"	Next → "Brother's Keeper"
- Chicago P.D. season 7

Crossover chronology
- Preceded by: February 2019 Chicago crossover event
- Followed by: February 2020 Chicago crossover event

"Infection" is a three-part fictional crossover event that exists within the Chicago television franchise. The event aired on NBC consecutively in three back-to-back one-hour time slots on October 16, 2019. It began with "Infection: Part I" of Chicago Fire, continued with "Infection: Part II" of Chicago Med, and then concluded with "Infection: Part III" of Chicago P.D. All three episodes followed a unified story line of an infection spreading across Chicago and the first responders dealing with the repercussions. Many actors in the franchise appeared outside of their main series and in all three parts of the crossover.

== Plot ==
=== Part 1 ===
At a Chicago Bears game, members of Firehouse 51, the Intelligence Unit, and Chicago Med are tailgating. After Matthew Casey notices a man collapse in the middle of the festivities, they head over to help and find the man with a flesh-eating infection on his legs; he keeps repeating the letters "BRT." The man is taken to Chicago Med where they identify the infection as necrotizing fasciitis. Ambulance 61 gets dispatched to a house where they find two people dead inside from the same infection. Jay Halstead identifies the original victim as a student at a local university. Cruz reveals to Mouch and Brett that he is going to propose to Chloe. Burgess responds to a call at a gas station where a woman and her child are both infected. They both die later at Chicago Med. Boden begins dealing with the mayor's office when the house is assigned to parade duties. Firehouse 51 responds to a fire at Central Chicago University (CCU), where a large chemical fire has broken out. While in the basement rescuing trapped people Severide notices a panel on the wall which has the "BRT" letters on it. The discovery allows intelligence to begin putting together a connection between the infection and the university. After shift Chloe breaks up with Cruz. Intelligence discovers that the original victim was a lab assistant at CCU who had been telling professors that there would be an apocalyptic-type event in Chicago. Burgess and Upton go to Chicago Med to question him; however, when they arrive, they discover that he has died. The Office of Fire Investigation determines that the fire at CCU was deliberately set. Jay Halstead learns that another lab assistant at CCU, Veronica Song, was supposed to be in the lab at the time of the fire but didn't show up. Upton arrives at Song's house to question her; however, after Upton enters, Song collapses from infection. They are both brought to Chicago Med where Song is rushed into surgery.

=== Part 2 ===
The press begins questioning Goodwin about the infection. Upton gets examined for potential infection after finding Song's blood on her; Song later flatlines in surgery and is unable to be revived. The Centers for Disease Control (CDC) arrives to begin tracking down the source of the infection. Ambulance 61 along with two other ambulance companies get dispatched to Song's apartment complex where they find five infected patients. The CDC along with Chicago Med, Fire, and P.D., evacuate the apartment building in hopes to finding more leads. P.D. narrows down all sources of the infection to either CCU or the apartment building and identifies it's being spread via a bug sprayer. The CDC thoroughly inspects the apartment building and finds a bug sprayer being burned in the furnace. Voight and Upton begin interviewing tenants of the apartment building who all collectively describe a man who appeared to be an exterminator. CCU students reveal that they were working with the infection hoping to develop a treatment for it although their progress in this regard was destroyed in the fire. One apartment tenant mentions a blue pickup truck with a grey circle which intelligence begins searching for. When the apartment tenants get impatient they all escape quarantine but most are later found. Upton's test comes back clear and she is released. Intelligence tracks down a blue pickup in the vicinity of the apartment building and the tag plate comes back to a car rental company. CCU students along with Will Halstead continue looking for a treatment and begin making progress. Burgess and Ruzek question the car rental employee and get security footage, the renter is positively identified as an employee of the CCU lab. Meanwhile, Firehouse 51 is dispatched to a public disturbance call. Will Halstead walks in on a lab assistant, David Seldon, destroying microbiology samples, the two engage in a fight but Seldon ultimately wins by hitting Halstead on the head with medical equipment, knocking him unconscious; Seldon runs away.

=== Part 3 ===
Voight and Jay Halstead arrive at Chicago Med looking for Seldon, who had been identified as the renter of the truck, but he is nowhere to be found. At the public disturbance call, Firehouse 51 and P.D. have trouble maintaining order when civilians believe they know who caused the outbreak and want to take matters into their own hands. Chicago Med is put on lockdown as they begin searching for Seldon. Jay walks by the security guard and tells him Voight is looking for him. Both Voight and the security guard feverishly walk down the hallway. The security guard explains that a "Code Silver" is the mandated code for a shooter in the hospital. Hospital security cameras reveal he already escaped so they begin broadening their search. Jay Halstead and Upton find a house they suspect Seldon to be in although all they find is his ex-wife. Intelligence questions the ex-wife who tells them Seldon isn't done yet. They also end up on a wild goose chase when they get many leads in different areas around the city from civilians trying to help. Seldon is setting up false leads. The team finds his lab with many medical experimentation tools and a map with an area circled that includes a parade route. Firehouse 51 arrives to assist with the parade only to find the route to have no spectators due to widespread fear from the infection. Intelligence finds out that BRT had previously been funding Seldon experiments but when funding was unexpectedly cut he snapped and started planning to release the infection. Further investigation leads them to believe that Seldon is planning to release the infection at BRT headquarters where a board meeting is taking place. The CDC and Firehouse 51 are called to help evacuate the building. Meanwhile, the team at Med working on a treatment finds a proper antibiotic that attacks and reduces the infection. Atwater, Jay Halstead, and Upton begin evacuating the building. In the boardroom Halstead finds the entire board taken hostage by Seldon and begins trying to deescalate the situation. Upton, with a sniper rifle on the adjacent building, creates a distraction which allows Voight and the rest of the team to enter. Seldon refuses to surrender and is shot dead by Voight. After wrapping up the case everyone begins settling down back into their own lives.

== Cast and characters ==
=== Main ===
Actor	Character	Episode		
Actor	Character	Chicago Fire	Chicago Med	Chicago P.D.
Jesse Spencer	Matthew Casey	Main	Guest	Guest
Taylor Kinney	Kelly Severide	Main	Guest	Guest
Kara Killmer	Sylvie Brett	Main	Guest	Guest
David Eigenberg	Christopher Herrmann	Main	Guest	Guest
Joe Minoso	Joe Cruz	Main		Guest
Christian Stolte	Randy "Mouch" McHolland	Main		Guest
Miranda Rae Mayo	Stella Kidd	Main		Guest
Annie Ilonzeh	Emily Foster	Main	Guest	Guest
Eamonn Walker	Wallace Boden	Main	Guest	Guest
Nick Gehlfuss	Will Halstead	Guest	Main	Guest
Yaya DaCosta	April Sexton	Guest	Main	Guest
Torrey DeVitto	Natalie Manning	Guest	Main	Guest
Brian Tee	Ethan Choi		Main	
Marlyne Barrett	Maggie Lockwood	Guest	Main	
S. Epatha Merkerson	Sharon Goodwin	Guest	Main	Guest
Oliver Platt	Daniel Charles		Main	
Dominic Rains	Crockett Marcel	Guest	Main	Guest
Jason Beghe	Henry "Hank" Voight	Guest	Guest	Main
Jesse Lee Soffer	Jay Halstead	Guest	Guest	Main
Tracy Spiridakos	Hailey Upton	Guest	Guest	Main
Marina Squerciati	Kim Burgess	Guest	Guest	Main
Patrick John Flueger	Adam Ruzek	Guest	Guest	Main
LaRoyce Hawkins	Kevin Atwater	Guest	Guest	Main
Lisseth Chavez	Vanessa Rojas	Guest	Guest	Main
Amy Morton	Trudy Platt		Guest	Main

=== Notable guests ===
Actor	Character	Episode		
Actor	Character	Chicago Fire	Chicago Med	Chicago P.D.
Aaron Serotsky	David Seldon	Guest	Guest	Guest
Eunji Kim	Veronica Song	Guest	Guest	Guest
Kristen Gutoskie	Chloe Allen	Guest		
Alberto Rosende	Blake Gallo	Guest		Guest
Ricky Bartlett (disabled actor)	Security Guard 1			Guest
Eileen Galindo	Mama Garcia	Guest		Guest
Randy Flagler	Harold Capp	Guest		Guest
Daniel Kyri	Darren Ritter	Guest		Guest
Anthony Ferraris	Tony Ferraris	Guest		Guest
Kathleen Munroe	Andrea Danover		Guest	Guest
Kyla Kenedy	Amanda		Guest	Guest
Jeremy Shouldis	Marty Peterson		Guest	Guest
Louise Lamson	Heather Holcomb		Guest	Guest

== Production ==
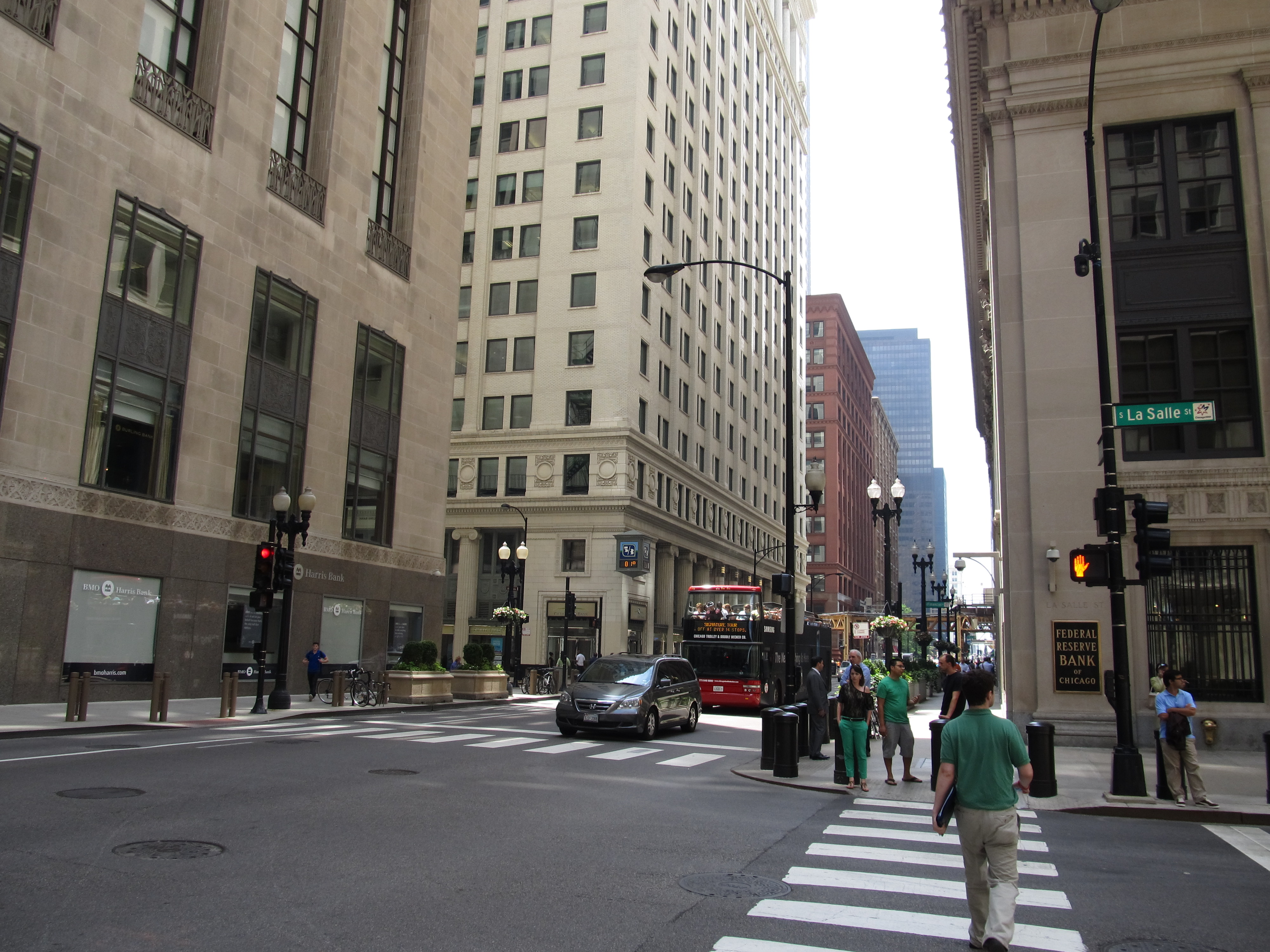
The intersection of Jackson Blvd and LaSalle Street in Chicago, Illinois, was used to film the empty parade route scene seen in the crossover.

On September 2, 2019, it was announced that the production teams Chicago franchise were planning another crossover event between Chicago Fire, Chicago Med, and Chicago P.D. Executive producer on all three series, Dick Wolf, and Chicago Fire showrunner, Derek Haas, wrote the story for all three episodes. Compared to previous crossover events within the franchise producers wanted the event to feel more like a three-hour television movie with Haas saying "This year, we just said, 'why don't we get all three shows active in the first hour?'" Haas also stated about the crossover "I haven't written Med since we did the Med [spinoff] episode. But you'll see why that's feasible, because it's less about each show having its own shape to it and more like all three shows really intertwined throughout. You could be watching any hour and be like, 'Oh, wait, is this P.D.? Or is this Med? Or is this Fire?' We're even doing scenes that you would think would be a Med scene, but it's in the Fire hour." All three episodes filmed in Chicago, Illinois and the entire event took over sixteen days to film. On filming the empty street for the parade route scene Haas said "One of the original ideas was: What would it look like if Michigan Avenue were empty of people? How spooky would that be?"

== Reception ==
=== Critical response ===
Vlada Gelman with TVLine said that the "crossover proved to be a monumental event for some of the Windy City's finest."

=== Viewing figures ===
The three-part event aired from 8:00-11:00 pm EDT on October 16, 2019, on NBC. Chicago Fire switched timeslots with Chicago Med for the evening with Fire airing an hour earlier than usual. The first part of the crossover was watched live by 8.23 million viewers, the second part rose to 8.93 million, the final part dropped back down to 8.62 million. The high viewing figures led to the crossover being called the "dominant event of the night." Deadline Hollywood said "NBC's three-part Chicago crossover titled "Infection" came on strong Wednesday night, giving a boost to all three franchises for NBC in the adults 18–49 demographic."
