= Chicago (franchise) =

American television series franchise

One Chicago franchise
- Created by: Derek Haas; Michael Brandt; Dick Wolf
- Original work: Chicago Fire
- Owners: Wolf Entertainment; NBCUniversal

Films and television
- Television series: Chicago Fire; Chicago P.D. Chicago Med; Chicago Justice

Miscellaneous
- Related TV series: Law & Order; Law & Order: Special Victims Unit; Law & Order: Organized Crime; FBI; FBI: Most Wanted; FBI: International; CIA

Official website
- www.nbc.com/one-chicago

One Chicago is a media franchise of American television programs created by Derek Haas, Michael Brandt, and Dick Wolf, produced by Wolf Entertainment, and broadcast on NBC, all of which deal with different public services in Chicago, Illinois. The Chicago franchise has maintained strong ratings, leading primetime in total viewers, averaging nearly seven million viewers per show, between Chicago Fire, Chicago P.D., and Chicago Med. NBC renewed Fire, Med and P.D. for the 2026–2027 broadcast season on March 27, 2026.

Four television series make up the Chicago franchise: Fire, P.D., Med, and Justice. All series in total amount to 812 episodes across 42 seasons of television.

== Television series ==
The Chicago franchise focuses on the professional and private lives of the firefighters, police officers, emergency medical personnel, and legal professionals who serve the city of Chicago. A recurring and unifying theme of the four shows is Molly's, a small bar owned by three firefighters which has been frequented by characters from all four shows. Dick Wolf has stated that most episodes in the franchise will end with a scene at Molly's, saying that "it's a great note on the end of every show that connects all the shows".

On September 26, 2018, NBC moved all three shows into consecutive time slots on Wednesday. On February 28, 2019, NBC renewed Chicago Fire, Chicago P.D., and Chicago Med for their eighth, seventh, and fifth seasons, respectively. All three Chicago shows will keep their respective time slots for the 2019–20 television season. On March 13, 2020, the production of season 5 of Med, 8 of Fire, and 7 of P.D. were suspended due to the COVID-19 pandemic.

=== Chicago Fire ===
Chicago Fire follows the firefighters, paramedics, and rescue squad members of Chicago Fire Department Firehouse 51.

=== Chicago P.D. ===
Chicago P.D. follows the uniformed patrol officers and detectives of the Chicago Police Department's 21st District, specifically the Intelligence Unit. The Chicago Fire episode "Let Her Go" serves as the backdoor pilot.

=== Chicago Med ===
Chicago Med follows the doctors and nurses of Gaffney Chicago Medical Center. The Chicago Fire episode "I Am the Apocalypse" serves as the backdoor pilot.

=== Chicago Justice ===
Chicago Justice followed the prosecutors and investigators at the Cook County State's Attorney's Office. The Chicago P.D. episode "Justice" served as the backdoor pilot. The series was canceled after one season.

== Series overview ==
Series	Season	Episodes	Originally released		Showrunner	Rank	Average viewers (million)	Status
Series	Season	Episodes	First released	Last released	Showrunner	Rank	Average viewers (million)	Status
Chicago Fire	1	24	October 10, 2012	May 22, 2013	Matt Olmstead, Michael Brandt, and Derek Haas	51	7.78	Released
Chicago Fire	2	22	September 24, 2013	May 13, 2014	Matt Olmstead, Michael Brandt, and Derek Haas	31	9.70	Released
Chicago Fire	3	23	September 23, 2014	May 12, 2015	Matt Olmstead, Michael Brandt, Derek Haas, and Dick Wolf	47	9.65	Released
Chicago Fire	4	23	October 13, 2015	May 17, 2016	Matt Olmstead, Michael Brandt, and Derek Haas	31	10.47	Released
Chicago Fire	5	22	October 11, 2016	May 16, 2017	Matt Olmstead, Michael Brandt, and Derek Haas	26	9.92	Released
Chicago Fire	6	23	September 28, 2017	May 10, 2018	Derek Haas	29	9.67	Released
Chicago Fire	7	22	September 26, 2018	May 22, 2019	Derek Haas	14	11.37	Released
Chicago Fire	8	20	September 25, 2019	April 15, 2020	Derek Haas	8	11.70	Released
Chicago Fire	9	16	November 11, 2020	May 26, 2021	Derek Haas	7	10.23	Released
Chicago Fire	10	22	September 22, 2021	May 25, 2022	Derek Haas and Andrea Newman	7	9.81	Released
Chicago Fire	11	22	September 21, 2022	May 24, 2023	Derek Haas and Andrea Newman	5	9.25	Released
Chicago Fire	12	13	January 17, 2024	May 22, 2024	Andrea Newman	8	8.79	Released
Chicago Fire	13	22	September 25, 2024	May 21, 2025	Andrea Newman	TBA	TBA	Released
Chicago Fire	14	21	October 1, 2025	May 13, 2026	Andrea Newman	TBA	TBA	Released
Chicago P.D.	Backdoor pilot		May 15, 2013		Matt Olmstead, Michael Brandt, and Derek Haas	—N/a	6.90	Released
Chicago P.D.	1	15	January 8, 2014	May 21, 2014	Matt Olmstead	50	8.03	Released
Chicago P.D.	2	23	September 24, 2014	May 20, 2015	Matt Olmstead, Michael Brandt, Derek Haas, and Dick Wolf	51	8.74	Released
Chicago P.D.	3	23	September 30, 2015	May 25, 2016	Matt Olmstead, Michael Brandt, and Derek Haas	47	8.71	Released
Chicago P.D.	4	23	September 21, 2016	May 17, 2017	Matt Olmstead, Michael Brandt, and Derek Haas	36	8.48	Released
Chicago P.D.	5	22	September 27, 2017	May 9, 2018	Richard Eid	24	10.32	Released
Chicago P.D.	6	22	September 26, 2018	May 22, 2019	Richard Eid	18	11.18	Released
Chicago P.D.	7	20	September 25, 2019	April 15, 2020	Richard Eid	11	11.23	Released
Chicago P.D.	8	16	November 11, 2020	May 26, 2021	Richard Eid	10	9.73	Released
Chicago P.D.	9	22	September 22, 2021	May 25, 2022	Richard Eid (episodes 1–4) and Gwen Sigan (episode 5–22)	13	9.15	Released
Chicago P.D.	10	22	September 21, 2022	May 24, 2023	Gwen Sigan	11	8.27	Released
Chicago P.D.	11	13	January 17, 2024	May 22, 2024	Gwen Sigan	13	7.96	Released
Chicago P.D.	12	22	September 25, 2024	May 21, 2025	Gwen Sigan	TBA	TBA	Released
Chicago P.D.	13	21	October 1, 2025	May 13, 2026	Gwen Sigan	TBA	TBA	Released
Chicago Med	Backdoor pilot		April 7, 2015		Matt Olmstead, Michael Brandt, Derek Haas, and Dick Wolf	—N/a	8.43	Released
Chicago Med	1	18	November 17, 2015	May 17, 2016	Andrew Dettmann, Andrew Schneider, and Diane Frolov	37	9.83	Released
Chicago Med	2	23	September 22, 2016	May 11, 2017	Andrew Schneider and Diane Frolov	28	9.47	Released
Chicago Med	3	20	November 21, 2017	May 15, 2018	Andrew Schneider and Diane Frolov	27	10.10	Released
Chicago Med	4	22	September 26, 2018	May 22, 2019	Andrew Schneider and Diane Frolov	15	11.04	Released
Chicago Med	5	20	September 25, 2019	April 15, 2020	Andrew Schneider and Diane Frolov	12	11.22	Released
Chicago Med	6	16	November 11, 2020	May 26, 2021	Andrew Schneider and Diane Frolov	9	9.74	Released
Chicago Med	7	22	September 22, 2021	May 25, 2022	Andrew Schneider and Diane Frolov	11	9.11	Released
Chicago Med	8	22	September 21, 2022	May 24, 2023	Andrew Schneider and Diane Frolov	9	8.48	Released
Chicago Med	9	13	January 17, 2024	May 22, 2024	Andrew Schneider and Diane Frolov	12	8.20	Released
Chicago Med	10	22	September 25, 2024	May 21, 2025	Allen MacDonald	TBA	TBA	Released
Chicago Med	11	21	October 1, 2025	May 13, 2026	Allen MacDonald	TBA	TBA	Released
Chicago Justice	Backdoor pilot		May 11, 2016		Matt Olmstead, Michael Brandt, and Derek Haas	—N/a	6.75	Concluded
Chicago Justice	1	13	March 1, 2017	May 14, 2017	Michael Chernuchin	37	8.42	Concluded

== Main cast ==
Series	Character	Appearances						Actor	Duration
Series	Character	Franchise				Universe		Actor	Duration
Series	Character	Fire	P.D.	Med	Justice	SVU	FBI	Actor	Duration
Chicago Fire	Matthew Casey	Main	Guest					Jesse Spencer	2012–2021, 2022, 2023, 2024
Chicago Fire	Kelly Severide	Main	Guest					Taylor Kinney	2012–
Chicago Fire	Gabriela Dawson	Main	Recurring	Guest				Monica Raymund	2012–2018, 2019
Chicago Fire	Brian "Otis" Zvonecek	Main	Recurring	Guest				Yuri Sardarov	2012–2019
Chicago Fire	Wallace Boden	Main	Recurring	Guest				Eamonn Walker	2012–2024, 2025
Chicago Fire	Randall "Mouch" McHolland	Main	Recurring	Guest				Christian Stolte	2012–
Chicago Fire	Joe Cruz	Main	Recurring	Guest				Joe Minoso	2012–2026
Chicago Fire	Christopher Herrmann	Main	Recurring		Guest			David Eigenberg	2012–
Chicago Fire	Peter Mills	Main	Guest					Charlie Barnett	2012–2015
Chicago Fire	Leslie Shay	Main	Guest					Lauren German	2012–2015
Chicago Fire	Hallie Thomas	Main						Teri Reeves	2012–2013
Chicago Fire	Sylvie Brett	Main	Recurring		Guest			Kara Killmer	2014–2024
Chicago Fire	Jessica "Chili" Chilton	Main		Guest				Dora Madison	2015–2016
Chicago Fire	Jimmy Borelli	Main	Guest					Steven R. McQueen	2015–2016
Chicago Fire	Stella Kidd	Main	Guest					Miranda Rae Mayo	2016–
Chicago Fire	Emily Foster	Main	Guest					Annie Ilonzeh	2018–2020
Chicago Fire	Darren Ritter	Main	Guest					Daniel Kyri	2018–2025
Chicago Fire	Blake Gallo	Main	Guest					Alberto Rosende	2019–2024
Chicago Fire	Violet Mikami	Main		Guest				Hanako Greensmith	2020–
Chicago Fire	Gianna Mackey	Main						Adriyan Rae	2020–2021
Chicago Fire	Sam Carver	Main		Guest				Jake Lockett	2022–2025
Chicago Fire	Lizzie Novak	Main	Guest					Jocelyn Hudon	2024–
Chicago Fire	Dom Pascal	Main	Guest					Dermot Mulroney	2024–2026
Chicago Fire	Sal Vasquez	Main	Guest					Brandon Larracuente	2025–
Chicago Fire	Marcus Burke	Main						Da'Vinchi	2026–
Chicago P.D.	Hank Voight	Recurring	Main	Guest	Recurring			Jason Beghe	2012–
Chicago P.D.	Antonio Dawson	Recurring	Main (Note: Jon Seda left Chicago P.D. during its fourth season for Chicago Justice and returned to the former for its fifth season after the latter's cancellation.)		Main	Guest		Jon Seda	2012–2019
Chicago P.D.	Erin Lindsay	Recurring	Main	Guest		Recurring		Sophia Bush	2013–2017
Chicago P.D.	Jay Halstead	Recurring	Main	Recurring		Guest		Jesse Lee Soffer	2013–2023, 2026
Chicago P.D.	Adam Ruzek	Recurring	Main	Guest				Patrick John Flueger	2014–
Chicago P.D.	Kim Burgess	Recurring	Main	Guest				Marina Squerciati	2014–
Chicago P.D.	Alvin Olinsky	Guest	Main	Guest				Elias Koteas	2014–2018, 2024
Chicago P.D.	Kevin Atwater	Recurring	Main	Guest				LaRoyce Hawkins	2013–2026
Chicago P.D.	Trudy Platt	Recurring	Main	Guest				Amy Morton	2014–
Chicago P.D.	Hailey Upton	Guest	Main	Guest			Guest	Tracy Spiridakos	2017–2024, 2026
Chicago P.D.	Vanessa Rojas	Guest	Main	Guest				Lisseth Chavez	2019–2020
Chicago P.D.	Dante Torres		Main	Guest				Benjamin Levy Aguilar	2022–
Chicago P.D.	Kiana Cook		Main	Guest				Toya Turner	2024–2025
Chicago P.D.	Eva Imani		Main	Guest				Arienne Mandi	2025–
Chicago P.D.	Sean Roman	Recurring	Main	Guest		Guest		Brian Geraghty	2014–2016, 2020
Chicago P.D.	Sheldon Jin		Main					Archie Kao	2014
Chicago Med	Will Halstead	Recurring		Main				Nick Gehlfuss	2015–2023
Chicago Med	April Sexton	Recurring	Guest	Main				Yaya DaCosta	2015–2021, 2022
Chicago Med	Natalie Manning	Guest		Main				Torrey DeVitto	2015–2021, 2023
Chicago Med	Sarah Reese	Guest		Main				Rachel DiPillo	2015–2018, 2024–2025
Chicago Med	Connor Rhodes	Guest		Main				Colin Donnell	2015–2019
Chicago Med	Ethan Choi	Recurring		Main				Brian Tee	2015–2022
Chicago Med	Sharon Goodwin	Guest		Main				S. Epatha Merkerson	2015–
Chicago Med	Daniel Charles	Guest	Recurring	Main	Guest			Oliver Platt	2015–
Chicago Med	Maggie Lockwood	Guest		Main				Marlyne Barrett	2015–2025
Chicago Med	Ava Bekker	Guest		Main				Norma Kuhling	2017–2019
Chicago Med	Crockett Marcel	Guest		Main				Dominic Rains	2019–2024
Chicago Med	Hannah Asher	Guest		Main				Jessy Schram	2020, 2022–
Chicago Med	Dean Archer	Guest		Main				Steven Weber	2021–
Chicago Med	Stevie Hammer			Main				Kristen Hager	2021–2022
Chicago Med	Dylan Scott		Guest	Main				Guy Lockard	2021–2022
Chicago Med	Mitch Ripley	Guest		Main				Luke Mitchell	2024–
Chicago Med	Caitlin Lenox	Guest		Main				Sarah Ramos	2024–
Chicago Med	John Frost	Guest		Main				Darren Barnet	2024–
Chicago Justice	Peter Stone		Guest		Main (Note: Philip Winchester joined the main cast of Law & Order: Special Victims Unit in the nineteenth season following the cancellation of Chicago Justice.)			Philip Winchester	2016–2019
Chicago Justice	Antonio Dawson	Recurring	Main		Main	Guest		Jon Seda	2012–2019
Chicago Justice	Laura Nagel		Guest		Main			Joelle Carter	2016–2017
Chicago Justice	Anna Valdez		Guest		Main			Monica Barbaro	2017
Chicago Justice	Mark Jefferies	Guest			Main	Guest		Carl Weathers	2016–2017, 2018

== Crossovers ==
The following table displays all the crossover storylines involving the Chicago series.

Crossover Between			Episode Title	Actors Appearing Outside Their Series	Date Broadcast	Description	Type
Series A	Series B	Series C	Episode Title	Actors Appearing Outside Their Series	Date Broadcast	Description	Type
Chicago Fire	Chicago P.D.	—N/a	"Let Her Go" (Chicago Fire S01E23)	Appearing in Series A: Jason Beghe, Jon Seda, LaRoyce Hawkins	May 15, 2013	Events force Lieutenant Casey to team up with the Intelligence Unit, now run by Voight, who doesn't appear to have changed his crooked ways after his stint in prison.	Backdoor Pilot
Law & Order: SVU	Chicago P.D.	—N/a	"Comic Perversion" (Law & Order: SVU S15E15) "Conventions" (Chicago P.D. S01E06)	Appearing in Series A: Sophia Bush; Appearing in Series B: Ice-T, Kelli Giddish, David Eigenberg	February 26, 2014	Chicago detective Erin Lindsay asks the NYPD for help in solving a series of rapes and murders, so Tutuola and Rollins head to Chicago to help Voight and Antonio catch the culprit.	Two-Part Crossover
Chicago Fire	Chicago P.D.	—N/a	"A Dark Day" (Chicago Fire S02E20) "8:30 PM" (Chicago P.D. S01E12)	Appearing in Series A: Jason Beghe, Jon Seda, Sophia Bush, Jesse Lee Soffer, Marina Squerciati, LaRoyce Hawkins; Appearing in Series B: Jesse Spencer, Taylor Kinney, Eamonn Walker, Lauren German, Charlie Barnett, Joe Minoso	April 29, 2014; April 30, 2014	A major explosion takes place at Chicago Med where Casey and Dawson are volunteering at a charity run, so Firehouse 51 and Intelligence work together to track down the culprits.	Two-Part Crossover
Chicago Fire	Law & Order: SVU	Chicago P.D.	"Nobody Touches Anything" (Chicago Fire S03E07) "Chicago Crossover" (Law & Order: SVU S16E07) "They'll Have to Go Through Me" (Chicago P.D. S02E07)	Appearing in Series A: Jason Beghe, Sophia Bush, Kelli Giddish; Appearing in Series B: Jason Beghe, Sophia Bush, Jesse Lee Soffer; Appearing in Series C: Danny Pino, Kelli Giddish, Mariska Hargitay	November 11, 2014; November 12, 2014	When Firehouse 51 rescues the owner of a house on fire, they find him clutching a suspicious box, so the Chicago Intelligence Unit is brought in for further investigation, leading them to work with Special Victims Unit to take down a child pornography ring.	Three-Part Crossover
Chicago Fire	Chicago P.D.	—N/a	"Three Bells" (Chicago Fire S03E13) "A Little Devil Complex" (Chicago P.D. S02E13)	Appearing in Series A: Marina Squerciati, Brian Geraghty, Jon Seda; Appearing in Series B: Monica Raymund, Charlie Barnett, Eamonn Walker	February 3, 2015; February 4, 2015	When more clues about Shay's death are found, Firehouse 51 works with Intelligence to apprehend the arsonist suspected of killing her.	Two-Part Crossover
Chicago Fire	Chicago Med	—N/a	"I Am the Apocalypse " (Chicago Fire S03E19)	Appearing in Series A: Nick Gehlfuss, Yaya DaCosta, Oliver Platt, S. Epatha Merkerson, Jon Seda, Jesse Lee Soffer, Patrick Flueger	April 7, 2015	The team transports victims of a chemical leak to Chicago Med, where the bad situation turns even worse due to a grenade-carrying madman who claims to have a deadly airborne disease. After the explosion everybody starts to panic and begin to flee with the doctors telling everyone to stay put and puts Chicago Med on lock down	Backdoor Pilot
Chicago Fire	Chicago P.D.	Law & Order: SVU	"We Called Her Jellybean" (Chicago Fire S03E21) "The Number of Rats" (Chicago P.D. S02E20) "Daydream Believer" (Law & Order: SVU S16E20)	Appearing in Series A: Mariska Hargitay, Jason Beghe, Jon Seda, Tamara Tunie; Appearing in Series B: Mariska Hargitay, Danny Pino, Ice-T, Peter Scanavino, Jesse Spencer, Eamonn Walker, Nick Gehlfuss; Appearing in Series C: Jason Beghe, Sophia Bush, Jesse Lee Soffer, Marina Squerciati, Brian Geraghty	April 28, 2015; April 29, 2015	An apartment fire connected to a case of attempted rape and murder in Chicago resembles an unsolved case in New York, so Special Victims Unit and Intelligence work together to find the suspect.	Three-Part Crossover
Chicago Fire	Chicago Med	Chicago P.D.	"The Beating Heart" (Chicago Fire S04E10) "Malignant" (Chicago Med S01E05) "Now I'm God" (Chicago P.D. S03E10)	Appearing in Series A: Brian Tee, Nick Gehlfuss, Amy Morton, Patrick Flueger, Marina Squerciati, Colin Donnell, Yaya DaCosta; Appearing in Series B: Taylor Kinney, Monica Raymund, Kara Killmer, Dora Madison, David Eigenberg, Joe Minoso, Christian Stolte, Jesse Lee Soffer, Sophia Bush; Appearing in Series C: Torrey DeVitto, Oliver Platt	January 5, 2016; January 6, 2016	Christopher Herrmann is treated for stab wounds at Chicago Med, while a comatose woman rescued from a fire is discovered to be one of four patients given unnecessary chemotherapy by a doctor who may have killed Voight's wife.	Three-Part Crossover
Law & Order: SVU	Chicago P.D.	—N/a	"Nationwide Manhunt" (Law & Order: SVU S17E14) "The Song of Gregory William Yates" (Chicago P.D. S03E14)	Appearing in Series A: Jason Beghe, Sophia Bush, Jon Seda; Appearing in Series B: Mariska Hargitay, Ice-T, Eamonn Walker, Brian Tee	February 10, 2016	Chicago detectives Lindsay and Dawson come to New York to assist in the hunt for two escaped murderers, one of whom is Greg Yates, who returns to Chicago and commits a triple homicide, so SVU detectives Benson and Tutuola come to Chicago to join in the investigation.	Two-Part Crossover
Chicago P.D.	Chicago Justice	—N/a	"Justice" (Chicago P.D. S03E21)	Appearing in Series A: Philip Winchester, Joelle Carter, Carl Weathers, Taylor Kinney, Joe Minoso, Steven R. McQueen, Kara Killmer, Colin Donnell, Brian Tee, Marlyne Barrett	May 11, 2016	Assistant States Attorney Peter Stone has been assigned to help defend Burgess and conduct his own investigation of her shooting of an unarmed African American teenager who is accused of shooting her partner.	Backdoor Pilot
Chicago Fire	Chicago P.D.	—N/a	"Some Make It, Some Don't" (Chicago Fire S05E09) "Don't Bury This Case" (Chicago P.D. S04E09)	Appearing in Series A: Jason Beghe, Sophia Bush, Amy Morton, Marlyne Barrett; Appearing in Series B: Taylor Kinney, Jesse Spencer, Christian Stolte	January 3, 2017	Severide finds himself slipping back into old habits as he continues to help Anna with a bone marrow procedure. He's brought into the District when his car is found to have caused a deadly crash and during the investigation, the Chicago police track down a group of carjackers who may be the key to proving Severide's innocence.	Two-Part Crossover
Chicago Fire	Chicago P.D.	Chicago Justice	"Deathtrap" (Chicago Fire S05E15) "Emotional Proximity" (Chicago P.D. S04E16) "Fake" (Chicago Justice S01E01)	Appearing in Series A: S. Epatha Merkerson, Oliver Platt, Marlyne Barrett, Yaya DaCosta, Brian Tee, Nick Gehlfuss, Torrey DeVitto, Jason Beghe, Sophia Bush, Marina Squerciati, Elias Koteas, Carl Weathers; Appearing in Series B: Philip Winchester, Jon Seda, Taylor Kinney, Eamonn Walker, Nick Gehlfuss, Torrey DeVitto, Kara Killmer, Brian Tee; Appearing in Series C: Elias Koteas, Jason Beghe, Taylor Kinney	March 1, 2017	A warehouse fire leaves Olinsky's daughter and 38 others dead. Chicago P.D.'s Intelligence Unit does all it can to track down the arsonist behind this tragedy. In Justice, the prime suspect's attorney does everything he can to get him acquitted, while ASA Peter Stone works really hard to find the way to get justice for the victims of the attack.	Three-Part Crossover
Chicago Justice	Law & Order	Chicago P.D.	"Uncertainty Principle" (Chicago Justice S01E02)	Appearing in Series A: Richard Brooks, Jason Beghe, Marina Squerciati, LaRoyce Hawkins, Amy Morton	March 5, 2017	At the request of Sgt. Hank Voight, Defense Attorney Paul Robinette travels to Chicago to defend Officer Kevin Atwater and faces off against ASA Peter Stone, the son of his former colleague Ben Stone.	Guest appearance
Law & Order: SVU	Chicago Justice	Law & Order	"The Undiscovered Country" (Law & Order: SVU S19E13)	Appearing in Series A: Philip Winchester, Sam Waterston	February 7, 2018	After traveling to New York to attend the funeral for his father, Ben Stone, Chicago ASA Peter Stone accepts a job offer from District Attorney Jack McCoy to work for the DA's office. His first case is the prosecution of ADA Rafael Barba, who is accused of murdering a terminally ill infant.	Guest appearance
Chicago P.D.	Chicago Fire	—N/a	"Profiles" (Chicago P.D. S05E16) "Hiding Not Seeking" (Chicago Fire S06E13)	Appearing in Series A: Jesse Spencer, Taylor Kinney, Monica Raymund, Kara Killmer, David Eigenberg, Joe Minoso, Christian Stolte, Eamonn Walker; Appearing in Series B: Jason Beghe, Jon Seda, Amy Morton, Patrick John Flueger, Jesse Lee Soffer, Tracy Spiridakos, Marina Squerciati, LaRoyce Hawkins	March 7, 2018; March 8, 2018	Intelligence and Firehouse 51 pursue a serial bomber targeting the media.	Two-Part Crossover
Chicago Fire	Chicago Med	Chicago P.D.	"Going to War" (Chicago Fire S07E02) "When to Let Go" (Chicago Med S04E02) "Endings" (Chicago P.D. S06E02)	Appearing in Series A: Nick Gehlfuss, Torrey DeVitto, Brian Tee, Jesse Lee Soffer, S. Epatha Merkerson; Appearing in Series B: Jesse Spencer, Taylor Kinney, Kara Killmer, David Eigenberg, Yuri Sardarov, Joe Minoso, Christian Stolte, Miranda Rae Mayo, Jesse Lee Soffer; Appearing in Series C: Taylor Kinney, Nick Gehlfuss, Brian Tee, Eamonn Walker, S. Epatha Merkerson, Annie Ilonzeh	October 3, 2018	A fire consumes a 25-story apartment complex, sending the residents to Chicago Med for treatment. When Intelligence discovers the cause of the fire, the case gets personal for Jay Halstead.	Three-Part Crossover
Law & Order: SVU	Chicago Justice	—N/a	"Zero Tolerance" (Law & Order: SVU S20E03)	Appearing in Series A: Carl Weathers	October 4, 2018	After an illegal immigrant child is separated from her mother, ADA Stone seeks out the help from his former boss, Chicago State's Attorney Mark Jefferies, to reunite them.	Guest appearance
Chicago Fire	Chicago P.D.	—N/a	"What I Saw" (Chicago Fire S07E15) "Good Men" (Chicago P.D. S06E15)	Appearing in Series A: Jesse Lee Soffer, Tracy Spiridakos, Jason Beghe; Appearing in Series B: Jesse Spencer, Taylor Kinney, Kara Killmer, David Eigenberg, Joe Minoso, Annie Ilonzeh, Eamonn Walker	February 20, 2019	A spate of robberies comes to light after a firehouse lockbox key goes missing.	Two-Part Crossover
Chicago Fire	Chicago Med	Chicago P.D.	"Infection: Part I" (Chicago Fire S08E04) "Infection: Part II" (Chicago Med S05E04) "Infection: Part III" (Chicago P.D. S07E04)	Appearing in Series A: Jason Beghe, Jesse Lee Soffer, Tracy Spiridakos, Patrick John Flueger, Marina Squerciati, LaRoyce Hawkins, Lisseth Chavez, Nick Gehlfuss, Yaya DaCosta, Torrey DeVitto, Dominic Rains, Marlyne Barrett, S. Epatha Merkerson; Appearing in Series B: Jesse Spencer, Taylor Kinney, Kara Killmer, David Eigenberg, Annie Ilonzeh, Eamonn Walker, Jesse Lee Soffer, Tracy Spiridakos, Patrick John Flueger, Marina Squerciati, LaRoyce Hawkins, Lisseth Chavez, Amy Morton, Jason Beghe; Appearing in Series C: Jesse Spencer, Taylor Kinney, Kara Killmer, David Eigenberg, Joe Minoso, Christian Stolte, Miranda Rae Mayo, Annie Ilonzeh, Eamonn Walker, Nick Gehlfuss, Yaya DaCosta, Torrey DeVitto, Dominic Rains, S. Epatha Merkerson	October 16, 2019	A rare but deadly bacteria takes its toll on numerous victims around the city, leaving Chicago's finest first responders to work together alongside the CDC to resolve the dangerous situation.	Three-Part Crossover
Chicago Fire	Chicago P.D.	—N/a	"Off the Grid" (Chicago Fire S08E15) "Burden of Truth" (Chicago P.D. S07E15)	Appearing in Series A: Jason Beghe, Marina Squerciati, Patrick John Flueger, LaRoyce Hawkins, Brian Geraghty; Appearing in Series B: Taylor Kinney, Kara Killmer, Christian Stolte, Annie Ilonzeh, Eamonn Walker	February 26, 2020	When Fire and P.D. team up to solve the case of a bad overdose, former Chicago Police Officer Sean Roman returns to Chicago to assist.	Two-Part Crossover
FBI	Chicago P.D.	—N/a	"Emotional Rescue" (FBI S02E19)	Appearing in Series A: Tracy Spiridakos	March 31, 2020	After the body of a college student is found in a drug deal gone bad, Chicago P.D. Detective Hailey Upton assists the FBI team in their investigation.	Guest Appearance
Chicago Fire	Chicago Med	Chicago P.D.	"In the Trenches: Part I" (Chicago Fire S13E11) "In the Trenches: Part II" (Chicago Med S10E11) "In the Trenches: Part III" (Chicago P.D. S12E11)	Appearing in Series A: Steven Weber, Jessy Schram, Luke Mitchell, Sarah Ramos, Darren Barnet, Oliver Platt, Jason Beghe, Marina Squerciati, Patrick John Flueger, Amy Morton; Appearing in Series B: Taylor Kinney, David Eigenberg, Christian Stolte, Miranda Rae Mayo, Daniel Kyri, Jake Lockett, Dermot Mulroney, Jason Beghe, Marina Squerciati, Patrick John Flueger, Amy Morton, LaRoyce Hawkins, Toya Turner; Appearing in Series C: Taylor Kinney, David Eigenberg, Christian Stolte, Miranda Rae Mayo, Dermot Mulroney, Steven Weber, Luke Mitchell, Sarah Ramos, Darren Barnet, S. Epatha Merkerson, Oliver Platt	January 29, 2025	When a gas explosion rocks a high-rise, Chicago's first responders come out in force to rescue hundreds of civilians. It is the calamity beneath the surface, however, that sends our heroes on a race to save 40 people trapped deep underground, including two of their own.	Three-Part Crossover
Chicago Fire	Chicago Med	Chicago P.D.	"Reckoning: Part I" (Chicago Fire S14E13) "Reckoning: Part II" (Chicago Med S11E13) "Reckoning: Part III" (Chicago P.D. S13E13)	Appearing in Series A: Jesse Lee Soffer, Tracy Spiridakos; Appearing in Series B: Jesse Lee Soffer, Tracy Spiridakos; Appearing in Series C: Jesse Lee Soffer, Tracy Spiridakos	March 4, 2026	Firehouse 51 is called to an airfield when a passenger jet suddenly goes silent mid-air, triggering a high-stakes emergency. Their discovery cracks open a bigger and deadlier mystery - one with consequences that could ripple far beyond the runway and put countless lives in jeopardy.	Three-Part Crossover
