= Annie Ilonzeh =

American actress (born 1983)

- Born: Annette Ngozi Ilonzeh; August 23, 1983 (age 43); Grapevine, Texas, U.S.
- Occupation: Actress
- Years active: 2007–present

Annette Ngozi Ilonzeh (born August 23, 1983) is an American actress. From 2010 to 2011, she played Maya Ward on the ABC daytime soap opera General Hospital, and later starred as Kate Prince in the short-lived ABC reboot of Charlie's Angels. She later had recurring roles on shows such as Arrow, Drop Dead Diva and Empire. In 2017, Ilonzeh played Kidada Jones in the biographical drama film All Eyez on Me and starred in the thriller 'Til Death Do Us Part. From 2018 to 2020, she started as Emily Foster in the NBC drama series, Chicago Fire.

== Life and career ==
Ilonzeh was born in Grapevine, Texas, and went to Colleyville Heritage High School. Her father is a Nigerian of Igbo descent, and her mother is white. In 2007, she made her television debut in an episode of the CBS sitcom How I Met Your Mother. She had bit roles in the movies He's Just Not That Into You, Miss March and Percy Jackson & the Olympians: The Lightning Thief. Ilonzeh had a recurring role in the CW prime time soap opera Melrose Place from 2009 to 2010, and in 2010 guest starred in three episodes of Entourage. From 2010 to 2011, she played the role of Maya Ward on the ABC daytime soap opera General Hospital.

In January 2011, Ilonzeh was announced as one of the "Angels" on the reboot of the 1970s television series Charlie's Angels. The series, which premiered in September 2011, received mostly negative reviews, and was cancelled the day after the fourth episode. In March 2012, it was announced that Ilonzeh would be recurring on The CW series Arrow. Later that year, she began appearing in a recurring role in the ABC Family drama series Switched at Birth. In 2013, she played a leading role in the Lifetime television film Killer Reality.

Ilonzeh also guest starred in the second season of CW's Beauty & the Beast, and had a recurring role on Lifetime comedy-drama Drop Dead Diva in 2013. Later, she had a recurring role on Person of Interest and Empire.

In 2017, Ilonzeh had her first major film role, playing Kidada Jones in the biographical drama All Eyez on Me, about hip-hop artist Tupac Shakur. Later that year, she played the leading role in the psychological thriller film 'Til Death Do Us Part. The film was released on September 29, 2017 and grossed $3.5 million. Also that year she guest-starred in American Horror Story: Cult episode "Great Again". In 2018, Ilonzeh appeared in the action thriller Peppermint, and was cast in a lead role on the ABC drama pilot Staties, which was not picked up to the series. Later in 2018, Ilonzeh began portraying Emily Foster in Dick Wolf's Chicago franchise, first starring in Chicago Fire. She was in two seasons, departing following Season 7. In 2021 she starred in another unsold pilot, the drama Getaway for NBC.

In 2022, Ilonzeh starred in the action-thriller film, Agent Game. The film was released in the United States on April 8, 2022, by Saban Films. It was panned by critics. In 2023, Ilonzeh starred in four films playing leading roles: the horror thriller Fear, the psychological thriller Ruined, the thriller Vicious Affair, and the horror-thriller Soul Mates. In 2024 she starred in the thriller film The Stepdaughter for Tubi.

In 2024, Ilonzeh joined the CBS series S.W.A.T. for the show's eighth and final season as Officer Devin Gamble. Ilonzeh's character is a gender flip reimagining of Officer Brian Gamble from the 2003 film adaption with the same name, who was portrayed by actor Jeremy Renner.

== Filmography ==
=== Film ===
Year	Title	Role	Notes
2009	He's Just Not That Into You	Hot Girl	
2009	Miss March	Beautiful Girl #2	
2009	Not Necessary	Whitley	Short film
2010	Percy Jackson & the Olympians: The Lightning Thief	Aphrodite Girl	
2017	All Eyez on Me	Kidada Jones	
2017	'Til Death Do Us Part	Madison Roland / Kate Smith	
2018	Peppermint	FBI Agent Lisa Inman	
2022	Agent Game	CIA Agent Caroline Visser	
2023	Fear	Bianca	
2023	Ruined	Olivia "Liv" Richards	
2023	Vicious Affair	Skylar Hastings	Also producer
2023	Soul Mates	Allison	Also producer
2024	The Stepdaughter	Whitney Hughes	Also producer
2024	Snatched	Vivian	
2024	The Stepdaughter 2	Whitney Hughes	
2025	Thinestra	Demetria	
2025	Singing in My Sleep	Rissa	
2025	Run	Melissa Ilonzeh	
2026	Rockabye	Christine Campbell	
2026	Run 2: Survival of the Human Race †	Melissa Ilonzeh	To be released
To be released	Loving Venus †	Venus	To be released
To be released	The Stepdaughter 3 †	Whitney Hughes	Upcoming Tubi film

=== Television ===
Year	Title	Role	Notes
2007	How I Met Your Mother	Becky	Episode: "The Yips"
2008	Do Not Disturb	-	Episode: "Pilot"
2009–2010	Melrose Place	Natasha	Recurring cast
2010–2011	General Hospital	Maya Ward	Regular cast
2010–2011	Entourage	Rachel	Recurring cast: Season 7, guest: Season 8
2011	The Game	Anthea	Episode: "A Very Special Episode"
2011	Charlie's Angels	Kate Prince	Main Cast
2012–2013	Switched at Birth	Lana	Recurring cast: Season 1–2
2012–2014	Arrow	Joanna De La Vega	Recurring cast: Season 1, guest: Season 2
2013	Killer Reality	Hayley Vance	TV movie
2013	Diary of a Champion	Ciara Tryce	Recurring cast
2013	Drop Dead Diva	Nicole	Recurring cast: Season 5
2013–2014	Beauty & the Beast	Beth Bowman	2 episodes
2014	Rush	Jordana Rourke	Episode: "Where Is My Mind?"
2015	Allegiance	Julia Marcus	Episode: "Pilot"
2015	Guy Theory	Skylar Thomas	Episode: "Perfect Storm"
2015	Graceland	Courtney Gallo	Recurring cast: Season 3
2015–2016	Person of Interest	Harper Rose	Recurring cast: Season 4, guest: Season 5
2016	Empire	Harper Scott	Recurring cast: Season 2
2017	American Horror Story: Cult	Erika	Episode: "Great Again"
2018–2020	Chicago Fire	Emily Foster	Main Cast: Season 7–8
2018–2020	Chicago P.D.	Emily Foster	Crossover Cast: Season 6–7
2019	Chicago Med	Emily Foster	Episode: "Infection, Part II"
2021	The Lower Bottoms	Beulah Rhodes	Main Cast, podcast
2024–2025	S.W.A.T.	Devin Gamble	Recurring cast: Season 8A, Main cast: Season 8B
2025—present	Love & Hip Hop: Miami	Herself	Guest: Season 7
