= Alberto Rosende =

American actor

- Born: Alberto Carlos Rosende; February 14, 1993 (age 33); South Florida, U.S.
- Education: New York University (BFA)
- Occupations: Actor, singer
- Years active: 2012–present
- Spouse: Tessa Mossey (m. 2022)

Alberto Carlos Rosende III is an American actor and singer, known for his role as Simon Lewis in the Freeform supernatural drama Shadowhunters from 2016 to 2019. From 2019 to 2024, he starred as Firefighter Blake Gallo in the NBC drama Chicago Fire.

== Early life and education ==
Rosende was born to Martha Cristina Ferrucho and Alberto Carlos Rosende, a major-general in the U.S. Army Reserve. He has a younger brother, Diego, who works in the film production industry. He is of Colombian and Cuban descent. Rosende attended Fort Lauderdale Children's Theater, where he appeared in a number of productions, which included starring as Link Larkin in Hairspray. He attended St. Thomas Aquinas High School in Fort Lauderdale, where he was a member of the STA Players. While there, Rosende performed as Danny Zuko in Grease, Emile De Becque in South Pacific, and Dr. Lyman Sanderson in Harvey. In April 2013, Rosende was diagnosed with testicular cancer. In 2015, Rosende graduated from New York University's Tisch School of the Arts with a Bachelor of Fine Arts.

== Career ==
Rosende's first professional acting credit was as a swing dancer in the 2013 short film The Swing of Things. In 2015, he guest-starred in the CBS police procedural drama Blue Bloods, in the fifth-season episode "Sins of the Father", as Carlos Santiago. That same year, he guest-starred in the NBC police procedural drama Law & Order: Special Victims Unit in the seventeenth-season episode "Catfishing Teacher" as Jordan Messina. On May 2, 2015, it was announced that Rosende had been cast as Simon Lewis in the Freeform supernatural drama Shadowhunters, based on Cassandra Clare's The Mortal Instruments book series, which ran from January 12, 2016, to May 6, 2019.

== Personal life ==
In December 2021, Rosende became engaged to actress and former Shadowhunters co-star Tessa Mossey. The couple got legally married in 2022, before having their ceremony in 2025 surrounded by friends and family in Prince Edward Island. The wedding was followed by Hello! Magazine and photos were published in August 2025.

== Filmography ==
Television and film roles
Year	Title	Role	Notes
2013	The Swing of Things	Swing Dancer	Short film
2015	Blue Bloods	Carlos Santiago	Episode: "Sins of the Father"
2015	Law & Order: Special Victims Unit	Jordan Messina	Episode: "Catfishing Teacher"
2016	Jahar	David	Short film
2016–2019	Shadowhunters	Simon Lewis	Main role, 55 episodes
2019–2024	Chicago Fire	Blake Gallo	Main role (seasons 8–11); guest role (season 12)
2019	Chicago P.D.	Blake Gallo	Episode: "Infection: Part III"
2020	Story Game	James	Short film
2022	Chicago Med	Blake Gallo	Episode: "Everyone's Fighting a Battle You Know Nothing About"

== Awards and nominations ==
Year	Nominated work	Award	Category	Result	Ref
2018	Shadowhunters	TV Scoop Awards	Best Drama Actor	Nominated	
