= Christian Stolte =

American actor (born 1962)

- Born: October 16, 1962 (age 63); St. Louis, Missouri, U.S.
- Occupation: Actor
- Years active: 1992–present

Christian Stolte (born October 16, 1962) is an American character actor.

== Career ==
He portrayed corrections officer Keith Stolte on the TV series Prison Break and Charles Makley in the film Public Enemies. He also portrayed Clarence Darby in the film Law Abiding Citizen.

He starred as chief appraiser David Kim Parker in The Onion's web series Lake Dredge Appraisal.

Stolte's acting career also includes voice over work (or voice acting) with Breathe Bible.

Since 2012, he has portrayed Randy McHolland (Mouch) in the NBC series Chicago Fire and other shows in the Chicago franchise.

== Filmography ==
=== Film ===
| Year | Title | Role | Notes |
|---|---|---|---|
| 2000 | The Brother 2 | Police officer | |
| 2001 | Novocaine | Court Guard | |
| 2001 | Ali | Miami Cop | |
| 2002 | Road to Perdition | Rooney's Business Associate | |
| 2004 | Mr. 3000 | Reporter | |
| 2006 | Stranger than Fiction | Young Boy's Father | |
| 2006 | Death of a President | John Rucinski | |
| 2007 | The Lucky Ones | Police Desk Sergeant | |
| 2008 | Leatherheads | Pete | |
| 2008 | Were the World Mine | Coach Driskill | |
| 2008 | The Express: The Ernie Davis Story | Dan Boyle | |
| 2009 | Public Enemies | Charles Makley | |
| 2009 | Law Abiding Citizen | Clarence James Darby | |
| 2010 | A Nightmare on Elm Street | Jesse's father | |

=== Television ===
| Year | Title | Role | Notes |
|---|---|---|---|
| 2005–2007 | Prison Break | Corrections Officer Keith Stolte (also known as C.O. #1) | Recurring role (season 1–2) |
| 2012–present | Chicago Fire | Randall "Mouch" McHolland | Main role |
| 2015–present | Chicago P.D. | Randall "Mouch" McHolland | Recurring Guest Role |
| 2012 | Lake Dredge Appraisal | David Kim Parker | YouTube series |
| 2016 | Boyband | Dennis "Damn Straight" Stevens | Supporting role |
| 2016–present | Chicago Med | Randall "Mouch" McHolland | Recurring Guest Role |
