= List of Chicago Med characters =

This is a list of fictional characters in the television series Chicago Med, the second spin-off in the Chicago franchise. The article deals with the main, recurring, and the minor characters of the series.

== Main ==
=== Overview ===
Name	Portrayed by	Occupation	Seasons											
Name	Portrayed by	Occupation	1	2	3	4	5	6	7	8	9	10	11	12
Dr. William "Will" Halstead	Nick Gehlfuss	Attending Physician in Emergency Medicine	Main										Guest	
April Sexton	Yaya DaCosta	Emergency Dept Nurse	Main							Recurring				
Dr. Natalie Manning	Torrey DeVitto	Pediatric Emergency Medicine Physician	Main (Note: Credited as a regular up to the first episode of the seventh season.)							Guest			Guest	
Dr. Sarah Reese	Rachel DiPillo	First Year Psychiatry Resident	Main			Guest						Recurring		
Dr. Connor Rhodes	Colin Donnell	First Year Fellow/Attending Physician in Trauma & Cardiothoracic Surgery	Main (Note: Credited as a regular up to the first episode of the fifth season.)											Guest
Dr. Ethan Choi	Brian Tee	Lieutenant Commander, USNR; Emergency Medicine Attending Physician	Main											
Sharon Goodwin	S. Epatha Merkerson	Executive Director of Patient and Medical Services	Main											
Dr. Daniel Charles	Oliver Platt	Chairman/Chief of Psychiatry	Main											
Maggie Lockwood	Marlyne Barrett	Emergency Department Charge Nurse	Main (Note: Credited as guest up to the thirteenth episode of the first season.)											
Dr. Ava Bekker	Norma Kuhling	Second Year Fellow & later Attending Physician in Cardiothoracic Surgery		Guest	Main (Note: Credited as a regular up to the first episode of the fifth season.)									
Dr. Crockett Marcel	Dominic Rains	Fourth Year Resident & later Attending Physician in General Surgery					Main (Note: Credited as a regular as of the second episode of the fifth season.)							
Dr. Dean Archer	Steven Weber	Attending Physician in General Surgery						Recurring	Main					
Dr. Dylan Scott	Guy Lockard	Pediatric Emergency Medicine Physician							Main (Note: Credited as a regular in the first episode of the eighth season only.)					
Dr. Stevie Hammer	Kristen Hager	Emergency Medicine Attending Physician							Main (Note: Credited as a regular in the first fourteen episodes of the seventh season only.)					
Dr. Hannah Asher	Jessy Schram	Emergency OB/GYN Attending Physician					Recurring	Guest	Main (Note: Credited as a regular as of the sixteenth episode of the seventh season.)					
Dr. Mitch Ripley	Luke Mitchell	Attending Physician in Emergency Medicine									Main (Note: Previously recurred in the first eight episodes of the ninth season.)			
Dr. Caitlin Lenox	Sarah Ramos	Chief of Emergency Medicine & Attending Physician in Trauma Surgery										Main		
Dr. John Frost	Darren Barnet	Pediatric Emergency Medicine Physician										Main		

=== Dr. Will Halstead ===
Will Halstead
- Chicago Med character
- First appearance: CPD: "Say Her Real Name" (episode 2.17)
- Last appearance: CM: "Horseshoes and Hand Grenades" (episode 11.03)
- Created by: Matt Olmstead
- Portrayed by: Nick Gehlfuss

In-universe information
- Full name: William Halstead
- Nicknames: Will; Big Red; Ginger Spice
- Gender: Male
- Title(s): Chief Resident, Chicago Med Emergency Department (season 1); Attending Physician, Chicago Med Emergency Department (seasons 2–8)
- Occupation: Doctor (plastic surgeon) (pre-series); Doctor (emergency medicine)
- Family: Patrick "Pat" Halstead (father; deceased); Mrs. Halstead (mother; deceased); Jay Halstead (brother); Unnamed grandfather Kevin (cousin); Moira (cousin)
- Significant others: Natalie Manning (former fiancée/current girlfriend); Hannah Asher (ex-girlfriend); Nina Shore (ex-girlfriend); Sabeena Virani (fling); Samara (ex-girlfriend)
- Children: Patrick James Halstead (son); Owen Manning (adoptive son)
- Relatives: Hailey Upton (former sister-in-law); Abby McSweeney (former sister-in-law)
- Nationality: American
- Date of birth: December 29, 1983
- Hometown: Chicago, Illinois
- Residence: Seattle, Washington; Chicago, Illinois (formerly); New York City (formerly)

Portrayed by Nick Gehlfuss

Dr. William "Will" Halstead is an attending in the Emergency Department. He was first introduced to the Chicago franchise in the Chicago P.D. episode "Say Her Real Name" as Detective Jay Halstead's estranged brother who drops by to visit in a two-episode arc. The character moved to Med after being introduced in the show's backdoor pilot on Chicago Fire and Gehlfuss was made a regular cast member when the characters at Chicago Medical Center who appeared in both Fire and P.D. were given their own spin-off.

Dr. Halstead was initially written as a plastic surgeon who left his private practice (or was implied in P.D. to have been "kicked out") in New York City and returned home to Chicago. After the backdoor pilot of Chicago Med, he decided to switch specialties to emergency medicine. When Med first premiered, he was Chief Resident. As of season 2 he has been an attending. He is characterized as a competent and compassionate doctor who tries to do what he thinks is best for his patient but his single-minded stubbornness has sometimes clouded his judgment, such as when he insists on a particular course of action that is contrary to both advice and evidence. Charge Nurse Maggie Lockwood, who sometimes uses the nickname "Big Red" when referring to Dr. Halstead, once described him as "a slightly anal, overly stubborn, rule breaking, control freak". Dr. Halstead's relationship with hospital administrator Sharon Goodwin has been historically fraught, and Halstead's job has been jeopardized on multiple occasions.

In season 1 Dr. Halstead clashes a number of times with Dr. Connor Rhodes, a trauma surgery fellow, and Sharon Goodwin, the chief administrator, over hospital practices and policies. He particularly disliked Dr. Rhodes as he felt the latter was an entitled "rich kid" from the more affluent northern suburbs. They eventually call an unspoken truce by the end of the season as they developed a mutual professional respect for one another. During the episode "Choices" he finds himself in hot water after ignoring a patient's DNR and faces a lawsuit as a result. He also earns the ire of attending Dr. Kendra Perrington in the episode "Inheritance" for overriding her at the request of the patient's brother, who was his former schoolmate, only to find out that she was on the hiring committee. This put his job prospects in jeopardy as he was in the last year of his residency. In the season 1 finale he receives a letter of offer for an attending position in the ED, much to his relief. For much of early season 2, he stresses out over his finances as he still had to pay off his student loans and sizeable malpractice insurance (due to his malpractice suit from the episode "Clarity"). He initially sees final-year medical student Jeff Clarke as a rival for Natalie's affections but develops a friendship with Clarke and often encourages him.

During the first season, Dr. Halstead had feelings for the pediatric emergency medicine fellow, Dr. Natalie Manning, who was then pregnant with her late husband's baby. It caused some awkwardness as her mother-in-law (portrayed by actress Annie Potts) was extremely protective and initially viewed him with suspicion. He eventually decided to move on and starts dating pathologist Nina Shore (portrayed by Patti Murin, the real-life wife of Gehlfuss' co-star Colin Donnell). They move in together in the season 2 episode "Free Will".

They break up in finale of season 2 because he still has feelings for Dr. Manning. In the first episode of season 3 “Nothing To Fear”, she returns from a three-month sabbatical and tells him she also has feelings for him too and they became a couple. In season 4 they prepare for their wedding but Dr. Halstead finds himself in a difficult position when a neighborhood friend he made a house call to turns out to be federally listed criminal wanted by both the CPD and FBI. His brother convinces him to continue making the house calls in order to feed information to the joint CPD-FBI task force.

When he was first introduced on P.D., it was implied that he and Jay had not seen each other for some time. Jay still has some lingering bitterness over the fact that Will was not around when their late mother was ill (she died of cancer). Despite this, they remain close and look out for one another. The brothers had a difficult relationship with their late father Pat as he disapproved of both his sons' occupations. The Halsteads are from a working class Irish Catholic background, as implied by Will's statements about growing up in Canaryville, a historically Irish neighborhood in the South Side of Chicago, and being an altar boy in his youth.

Will attended De La Salle Institute, where he excelled academically but was also bullied by the more popular students and given the derogatory nickname "Ginger Spice". It is likely that he and his brother were ostracized for coming from a lower socioeconomic background as Jay has also made a reference to being ostracized by his more affluent counterparts at private school.

Dr. Halstead plays the guitar and performed at weddings to pay his way through medical school. It was a reference to actor Nick Gehlfuss's days as a busker in New York City when he first entered the acting industry. He is a supporter of the Chicago White Sox like his father.

=== Dr. Natalie Manning ===
Natalie Manning
- First appearance: CM: "Derailed" (episode 1.01)
- Last appearance: CM: "Horseshoes and Hand Grenades" (episode 11.03)
- Created by: Matt Olmstead
- Portrayed by: Torrey DeVitto

In-universe information
- Full name: Natalie Conte
- Gender: Female
- Title(s): Attending in Emergency Medicine/pediatrics, Chicago Med
- Occupation: Doctor (pediatric emergency medicine)
- Family: Lou Conte (father); Carol Conte (mother); Helen Manning (mother-in-law); Joe (uncle)
- Spouse: Jeff Manning (deceased)
- Significant others: Will Halstead (ex-fiancé/current boyfriend); Phillip Davis (ex-fiancé); Crockett Marcel (ex-boyfriend); Jeff Clarke (ex-boyfriend)
- Children: Owen Manning (son); Patrick James Halstead (son)
- Hometown: Seattle, Washington
- Residence: Seattle, Washington; Chicago, Illinois (formerly)

Portrayed by Torrey DeVitto

Dr. Natalie Manning (née Conte) is a pediatrician originally from Seattle who is an attending in emergency medicine specializing in pediatrics.

Natalie was widowed when her husband, Jeff, a soldier, was killed in Afghanistan and gave birth to their son, Owen. She is revealed to be a skilled violinist, as seen in season 1 episode "Fallback" and season 2 episode "Brother's Keeper".

In season 1, Natalie is portrayed as a caring doctor who sometimes becomes overly emotionally connected to her young patients. In Season 1, Episode 10, "Clarity", Dr. Will Halstead kisses her, showing her that he has feelings for her. However, as she is grieving her late husband, she gently tells Dr Halstead that she does have feelings for him, it just "isn't the right time yet".

At the start of Season 2, she begins a relationship with Jeff Clarke. However, she breaks up with him after he "humiliates" her during a M&M review. He also reveals that he wished she was his wife, and not his ex Lisa, which makes her angry that he didn't tell her before she let him "into her life and her bed". After the breakup, she begins to have feelings for Will, but he is in a relationship with Nina Shore. After their break up, he ends up dancing with Natalie while at Noah's graduation party.

In the first episode of the third season “Nothing To Fear”, Natalie returns from a three-month sabbatical and tells Will she has feelings for him and they became a couple. They go on a break near the end of Season 3, where he drunkenly kisses one of Natalie's old co-workers. After she finds out, she becomes angry at him but he proposes to her in the season 3 finale anyway.

Season 4 sees the couple planning for their wedding, which shows that Natalie accepted his proposal. It also shows the couple attending Pre-Cana together. After Will was brought into protective custody during their wedding, they eventually broke up and Natalie returned his ring. At the end of Season 4, Agent Lee convinces Natalie to take Will back, so she goes after him and gets into his car as she was going to tell him that she still loves him, until a car hits them.

Natalie was brought into the ED at the start of Season 5, where she was diagnosed with a TBI. While unconscious, her ex-boyfriend, Phillip Davis slipped a ring onto her finger and convinced everyone that they were engaged, except for Dr. Marcel who brings it up with Phillip and tells Will. She eventually finds out and calls it off, before trying to get back with Will, who has moved on to Dr. Asher. It is unknown if she still likes Will or if he has any feelings left for her, but it is assumed that she has feelings for Dr Marcel after they were in a hostage situation in the Season 5 finale.

In Season 6, Natalie alters data on a trial Will is running to have her mother accepted. She then stole medication to treat her mother in secret. Will was irate when finding out but ready to take the blame for it. Knowing it could ruin his career, Natalie confessed what she'd done. The opening of Season 7 revealed Natalie had been fired and was leaving Chicago for a fresh start. She appears again in the Season 8 finale picking up Will at Seattle–Tacoma International Airport when it is revealed he has left Chicago to be with her romantically. He asks how long she wants him to stay, and she responds "I'm never letting you go." The implication being Will and Natalie have a long-term future off screen.

=== April Sexton ===
April Sexton
- First appearance: CF: "Forgive You Anything" (episode 3.17); CM: "Derailed" (episode 1.01)
- Last appearance: CM: "This Could Be the Start of Something New" (episode 8.09)
- Created by: Matt Olmstead
- Portrayed by: Yaya DaCosta

In-universe information
- Full name: April Layton Sexton
- Alias: April Choi
- Gender: Female
- Title(s): Nurse, Chicago Med Emergency Department
- Occupation: Nurse
- Family: Alfonso Sexton (father); Marcia Sexton (mother); Noah Sexton (brother); Unnamed cousin
- Spouse: Ethan Choi (m. 2022)
- Significant others: Tate Jenkins (ex-fiancé); Crockett Marcel (kissed); Kelly Severide (fling)
- Children: Unborn child (with Tate; miscarried)
- Relatives: Patrick Choi (father-in-law; deceased); Emily Choi (sister-in-law); Vincent Choi (grandfather-in-law; deceased); Vincent Choi (nephew)
- Date of birth: November 22, 1982

Portrayed by Yaya DaCosta

April Sexton is a nurse in the Emergency Department. She was first introduced in Chicago Fire as a friend of Lieutenant Kelly Severide.

April's parents were immigrants from Brazil. Their original family name was Suassuna but they anglicized it to "Sexton" as it was easier to pronounce. She attended high school with Severide and they share a close friendship. He had been going through a rebellious phase in high school after being abandoned by his father and the Sextons often invited him to their house out of concern.

April is courted by an ex-pro football player, Tate Jenkins (Daren J. Powell) whom she meets when Tate brings his young son into the ED. She is initially skeptical and views Tate as a "player," but after getting to know each other, she develops a trust in him and they move in together. He proposes to her in the episode "Inherent Bias".

In season 2, April is infected with Tuberculosis from a needle stick in the ED and has to deal with the ramifications in her personal and professional life. In the season 2 fall finale, it was revealed that she is pregnant. However, the treatment for her tuberculosis put her in a difficult position as the medication was potentially harmful to the fetus. She refused to have an abortion due to her Catholic faith. However, April suffers a miscarriage and her engagement to Tate ends.

In the season 2 finale, “Love Hurts” the doctors celebrate Noah Sexton's (April's younger brother) graduation party after he graduated medical school. April walks away from the party noticing that Noah is having a lot of fun. She walks over to a bridge and overlooks the water. As she stands there, Dr. Ethan Choi walks over and kisses her.

In season 3, Choi and April began a relationship, which they hide from the ED. A nurse grows suspicious of them and asks her questions, which April simply ignores. Later on, she opens up about her relationship to her coworkers in the ED. The two often clash in the ED about medical judgements over their patients, but continue to be very supportive of each other.

=== Dr. Sarah Reese ===
Sarah Reese
- First appearance: CM: "Derailed" (episode 1.01)
- Last appearance: CM: "...Don't You Cry" (episode 10.22)
- Created by: Matt Olmstead
- Portrayed by: Rachel DiPillo

In-universe information
- Gender: Female
- Title(s): Fourth Year Medical Student, Chicago Med (season 1); First Year Resident, Chicago Med Psychiatry Department (seasons 2–4)
- Occupation: Medical student (season 1); Doctor (psychiatrist) (seasons 2–4)
- Family: Robert Haywood (father); Mrs. Reese (mother)
- Significant other: Joey Thomas (ex-boyfriend)

Portrayed by Rachel DiPillo

Dr. Sarah Reese is a recent medical school graduate and psychiatry resident. The character was not introduced in the backdoor pilot on Chicago Fire.

In season 1 she was a Fourth Year Medical Student, still undecided about which specialty to choose. During her rotation in the ED, she decided against emergency medicine after a patient she had diagnosed chose to go against medical advice, leaving her discouraged. She chose pathology, but soon realized that she did not want to spend the rest of her training in a lab without any contact with patients, and even fainted from the stress. However, as her match was legally binding it meant that she would be left without a job if she rejected Chicago Med's offer. She worked as a barista until the head of psychiatry, Dr. Charles, offered her a spot in his department. She discovers that she enjoys interacting with patients and learning about the psychological side of medicine, although it leads her to subconsciously "shrink" her own colleagues, much to the nurses' amusement. Season 2 sees the character undergo further development as a full-fledged doctor and resident. At times she has let her emotions get in the way and Dr. Charles has had to step in to caution her. She has difficulty dealing with death and the experience of having to call time of death on a patient gets to her. During a night shift she had to make the call three times in a row, leading to her breaking down into tears at the end of the shift.

Her mother is a litigation attorney, implied to be a career woman who loves Sarah but is emotionally distant from her. During the season 1 finale, Sarah's mother does not attend her graduation from medical school but sends her money. She is a main cast member from season one until season four and appears for the final time in the season four premiere "Be My Better Half". This episode takes place after she found out that Doctor Charles discovered that her father was suspected to be a serial killer, causing a fallout between them. She decided to leave Chicago Med and join Baylor, as she said she could no longer trust Dr. Charles when he kept information about her father from her.

=== Dr. Connor Rhodes ===
Connor Rhodes
- First appearance: CM: "Derailed" (episode 1.01)
- Last appearance: CM: "Never Going Back to Normal" (episode 5.01)
- Created by: Matt Olmstead
- Portrayed by: Colin Donnell

In-universe information
- Gender: Male
- Title(s): Fellow of Trauma Surgery, Chicago Med (season 1); Fellow of Cardiothoracic Surgery, Chicago Med (seasons 1–3); Head of Hybrid OR, Chicago Med Emergency Department (seasons 4–5)
- Occupation: Doctor
- Family: Cornelius Rhodes (father; deceased); Elizabeth Rhodes (mother; deceased); Claire Rhodes (sister); Mr. Rhodes (paternal grandfather; deceased)
- Significant others: Sam Zanetti (ex-girlfriend); Robin Charles (ex-girlfriend); Ava Bekker (ex-girlfriend; deceased)

Portrayed by Colin Donnell

Dr. Connor Rhodes is a Trauma Surgery/later Cardiothoracic Surgery fellow. The character was not introduced in the backdoor pilot aired on Chicago Fire, as Colin Donnell only joined the cast as a series regular when Chicago Med was picked up.

Dr. Rhodes attended Universidad Autónoma de Guadalajara in Mexico and spent a year in Riyadh, Saudi Arabia following his residency. He was initially a trauma surgery fellow but switched to cardiothoracic surgery under the mentorship of Dr. David Downey, a renowned cardiothoracic surgeon. After Dr. Downey died, Connor was mentored by Dr. Latham, with whom he has a difficult relationship.

Dr. Rhodes comes from a wealthy background and was written as a "local boy" who left Chicago to escape his family before returning many years later. His background was a source of embarrassment and he initially tried to hide it from his colleagues in the ED, though they came to accept him as one of them and would good-naturedly tease him whenever his name appeared in a lifestyle magazine. His relationship with his family is complicated and it deteriorated further after his mother's suicide. His father, Cornelius Rhodes, was against Connor choosing to practice medicine rather than work in the family business (a high-end department store in Chicago), and he would repeatedly undermine and discourage Connor to the point where father and son are barely on speaking terms. In the episode "Inheritance" his sister Claire resorts to calling him at work and then confronting him in person to call him out on abandoning her in his attempt to get away from their father years ago. At the end of the episode he reluctantly visits her at the department store to take her to dinner, much to her delight. Dr. Rhodes’ mother suffered from chronic depression which caused her to be absent for much of his childhood. Connor remained in denial of this fact, remembering her as a doting and involved parent and blaming his father's infidelities for her suicide. In the episode “Forever Hold Your Peace”, Connor accepts the truth about his relationship with his mother at his father's prodding, but his father dies suddenly before they can reconcile. In the following episode, he visits his father's body in the morgue, and admits that while Cornelius was a bad father, he (Connor) was also a bad son.

He was in a relationship with attending surgeon Dr. Samantha "Sam" Zanetti but they break up in the episode "Saint" when she takes a job at Johns Hopkins in Baltimore. In season 2 he meets epidemiologist Dr. Robin Charles at the hospital cafeteria and they become friends, although it initially caused some awkwardness once he found out that she was Dr. Daniel Charles' daughter. They began cohabiting in the episode "Win Loss". Robin develops health problems that cause difficulties in their relationship; she begins behaving erratically, and it's discovered that she has a brain tumor. The tumor is successfully removed, but the relationship remains strained throughout her recovery. In the episode "Ties That Bind", Robin breaks up with Rhodes by leaving a letter on the table for him to read. He confronted Dr. Charles on the break up and vowed that he will find her to make the relationship work; however, Dr. Charles said that Robin had wanted to get treatment for her condition in peace.

In Season 3, Rhodes often clashes with Dr. Ava Bekker, a doctor from South Africa who Dr. Latham assigned him to work with. The two have a "love-hate" relationship due to their different medical opinions and personalities. At the end of the episode "Folie à Deux" they are seen kissing one another. In “Born This Way”, Rhodes is in the kitchen making breakfast as Ava puts on her clothes (implying that they had a one-night stand). Rhodes seems to want to pursue the relationship, but Bekker tells him that it was a one-time thing. However, in Season 4 they appear to be giving the relationship a try, although it later falls apart due to Connor's suspicions of Bekker.

In Season 4, Rhodes is about to leave to take a job at the Mayo Clinic when he is offered the opportunity to run Med's newly developing hybrid operating room in the hospital's emergency department. He decides to take the job at Med, not knowing that the hybrid OR was funded primarily by an anonymous donation from his father, and was solicited by Dr. Bekker. When Rhodes learns of the donation, his father suggests that Bekker traded sex with him in exchange for the donation. Rhodes breaks up with Bekker and becomes paranoid that she has been deliberately manipulating events to ensure she will remain part of his life, going so far as to accuse her of deliberately exposing herself to HIV and botching his father's heart surgery. When the failed operation is revealed to be due to a faulty implant, Connor briefly considers that he may have been wrong; however his father's sudden death by an insulin overdose, and Bekker's subsequent behaviour, leads him to believe that she is the killer.

In season 5, after the deaths of both his father and Bekker, who committed suicide after admitting to killing Cornelius in an attempt to win him back, Connor leaves Chicago to have a fresh start.

=== Dr. Ethan Choi ===
Ethan Choi
- First appearance: CM: "Derailed" (episode 1.01)
- Last appearance: CM: "This Could Be the Start of Something New" (episode 8.09)
- Created by: Matt Olmstead
- Portrayed by: Brian Tee

In-universe information
- Gender: Male
- Title(s): Resident, Chicago Med Emergency Department (season 1); Chief Resident, Chicago Med Emergency Department (seasons 2–3); Attending Emergency Medicine Doctor (seasons 3-6); Chief of Emergency Medicine (season 6–8)
- Occupation: Doctor; United States Navy Reservist (Lieutenant Commander)
- Family: Patrick Choi (father; deceased); Emily Choi (sister); Vincent Choi (paternal grandfather; deceased); Vincent Choi (nephew)
- Spouse: April Sexton (m. 2022)
- Significant other: Vicky Glass (ex-girlfriend)
- Relatives: Alfonso Sexton (father-in-law); Marcia Sexton (mother-in-law); Noah Sexton (brother-in-law); Unnamed cousin-in-law

Portrayed by Brian Tee

Lieutenant Commander Dr. Ethan Choi, USNR, is the former Chief of Emergency Medicine and a former active duty United States Navy officer. Like Dr. Rhodes, the character was not in the backdoor pilot and was only introduced when Chicago Med was picked up. He is generally reserved and reticent, which Dr. Charles attributes to his military background. His aloof and detached exterior sometimes intimidates the medical students and junior residents under him, but he is shown to be sympathetic and supportive with them, as well as his other coworkers and the CFD paramedics. He is of Korean descent (like actor Brian Tee) and once implies that he had been subjected to racism during his childhood since he grew up in a neighborhood where there were "not many families with the last name Choi".

Dr. Choi is well regarded by his colleagues in the ED. Beginning in season 2, he takes over from Dr. Halstead as Chief Resident and has an unforgettable first day, much to everyone's amusement because they are used to seeing him calm and in control. He initially tries to run his own system but quickly realizes that Maggie and the nurses are actually the ones in charge. After his rocky start, he returns to his usual dependable self.

A second-generation Navy veteran, Dr. Choi switches to the reserves to begin his residency and is revealed to be suffering from PTSD. He had been coping despite suffering from insomnia and nightmares and initially resists treatment since he is still functional at work. Eventually, he seeks proper treatment after breaking down in Dr. Charles' office but uses his work as an excuse to put off subsequent counseling sessions. After a series of emotional near-breakdowns and a heated confrontation with a patient's father, he resumes counselling and joins a support group at the VA. He adopts a parrot who refuses to fly due to trauma from being verbally abused and being cooped up in a hoarder's house for months. Dr. Choi also volunteers at the zoo as part of his therapy. He has only ever discussed his military service with fellow veterans, as seen in the Chicago P.D. episode "Forty-Caliber Bread Crumb", when he has drinks with former Army Rangers and combat veterans Detective Jay Halstead (Dr. Halstead's brother) and CPD tech analyst Greg "Mouse" Gurwitch at Molly's. Despite his cool and collected demeanor, it is apparent that he has been deeply affected by the horrors he witnessed overseas as well as in the ED. He has a notebook in which he writes down the name, date and time of death, and description of every patient who has died on his watch. In the season 5 episode "I Can't Imagine the Future", he is recalled by the Navy to cover for an aircraft carrier medical officer who had fallen ill and would be deployed for two months.

He lived with his then girlfriend Dr. Vicky Glass (Cynthia Addai-Robinson), who works at the nearby VA hospital and is a fellow Navy veteran. She is one of the few people he has confided in about his PTSD.

At the beginning of Season 3, Dr. Choi is seen to be in a relationship with ED nurse April Sexton, though they are keeping the relationship quiet at work. This is due to April's belief that she will be viewed negatively if her coworkers knew of the relationship. However, they make the relationship public after April realizes that no one would look down on her or assume she would receive special treatment because she is dating an ED doctor. Dr. Choi and April clash over how best to handle the troubles of his estranged sister, Emily, and at the end of Season 3, she breaks up with him because of this.

In Season 6, Dr. Choi became the new Chief of Emergency Medicine.

=== Sharon Goodwin ===
Sharon Goodwin
- First appearance: CF: "I Am the Apocolypse" (episode 3.19); CM: "Derailed" (episode 1.01)
- Created by: Matt Olmstead
- Portrayed by: S. Epatha Merkerson

In-universe information
- Full name: Sharon McGee
- Gender: Female
- Title(s): Chief of Patient and Medical Services, Chicago Med
- Occupation: Nurse; Hospital administrator
- Family: Sharon Goodwin (granddaughter); Isaiah (grandson)
- Spouses: Albert Goodwin (ex-husband; deceased)
- Children: Michael Goodwin (son); Tara Goodwin (daughter); David Goodwin (son)

Portrayed by S. Epatha Merkerson

Sharon Goodwin (née McGee), RN, MPH, MBA is the executive director of Patient and Medical Services and oversees the day-to-day operations of Gaffney Chicago Medical Center. A former OR nurse, she is generally the final authority when it comes to medico-legal issues, professional ethics and, when necessary, disciplining.

Sharon was happily married to Bert. He had been trying to persuade her to retire and entice her with exotic locations to travel to. In the episode "Intervention" they celebrated their 32nd wedding anniversary. However, Bert leaves her in the season 1 finale. The first several episodes of season 2 see her dealing with the emotional fallout and clearing out his belongings from their house. In the episode "Extreme Measures" she initiates divorce proceedings and tells the attorney that she and her husband were past reconciliation. Her first love had been photojournalist Reggie Dixon when she was an eighteen-year-old high school graduate but she chose to attend college rather than travel the world with him on his assignments. Bert did not appear on-screen until he brought his new lady-friend to the hospital in the season 2 episode, "Ctrl Alt".

=== Dr. Daniel Charles ===
Daniel Charles
- First appearance: CF: "I Am the Apocolypse" (episode 3.19); CPD: "Actual Physical Violence" (episode 3.03); CM: "Derailed" (episode 1.01)
- Created by: Matt Olmstead
- Portrayed by: Oliver Platt

In-universe information
- Gender: Male
- Title(s): Chief of Psychiatry, Chicago Med
- Occupation: Doctor (psychiatrist)
- Family: Lucas Charles (father; deceased); Margaret Charles (mother; deceased); Tommy Charles (brother; deceased); Matty Charles (nephew); Unnamed sister-in-law Unborn grandchild (miscarried)
- Spouses: Caroline "CeCe" Charles (wife; deceased); Susan Charles (ex-wife); Lucia Charles (ex-wife)
- Children: Robin Charles (daughter, with Caroline); Annabelle "Anna" Charles (daughter, with Susan)
- Date of birth: October 31, 1960

Portrayed by Oliver Platt

Dr. Daniel Charles, M.D., Ph.D. is the Chief of Psychiatry at Chicago Med. Outside of psychiatry, he is sometimes called in to help with difficult patients or speak to family members. The character has also crossed over to Chicago P.D. whenever Voight's team are dealing with a suspect or victim suffering from a psychiatric disorder which renders them dangerous and unpredictable. He has also been mentioned several times as the "shrink" Voight prefers to send his detectives to when they need counselling.

A well-known veteran psychiatrist at Chicago Med, Dr. Charles combines his human touch with instinct to diagnose patients. Because of his years of experience, the ED physicians turn to him for a second opinion. Occasionally, he has had to call out doctors in the ED for becoming too personally involved or invested in patients.

He has been married and divorced at least three times. His third wife is from Spain. One of his daughters Robin works at Chicago Med as an epidemiologist and was in a relationship with Dr. Rhodes. In the season 2 finale, he is shot after a patient waited a long time to be seen and didn't get the care he needed.

=== Maggie Lockwood ===
Maggie Lockwood
- First appearance: CM: "Derailed" (episode 1.01)
- Last appearance: CM: "...Don't You Cry" (episode 10.22)
- Created by: Matt Olmstead
- Portrayed by: Marlyne Barrett

In-universe information
- Full name: Margaret Lockwood
- Gender: Female
- Title(s): Charge Nurse, Chicago Med Emergency Department
- Occupation: Nurse
- Family: Unnamed mother (deceased); Denise Lockwood (sister); Unnamed sibling Unnamed niece Unnamed cousin
- Spouse: Ben Campbell (ex-husband)
- Significant other: Barry Vaughn (ex-boyfriend)
- Children: Vanessa Taylor (daughter); Auggie Roberts (former foster son)

Portrayed by Marlyne Barrett

Margaret "Maggie" Lockwood is the charge nurse of the Emergency Department and runs a tight ship with a firm hand and a quick-witted sense of humor. She has no qualms about calling out the doctors when needed and they generally defer to her for guidance during a chaotic shift ("Baghdad" mode). She is also a certified Emergency Medical Technician.

Underneath her no-nonsense exterior, Maggie is compassionate and protective of her nurses and the doctors and staff on her shift, often looking out for them as well. In season 1 she and April made sure the then-pregnant Dr. Manning did not overwork and was her "birthing partner". She also looks out for rookie resident Dr. Reese and frequently reminds her to "go home" or "get some sleep". The doctors sometimes use her as a "sounding board" and vent to her after a difficult shift.

In the episode "Natural History", it is revealed that she comes from a large and close-knit extended family and has a sister, Denise who was assigned male at birth, had gender confirmation surgery and moved to Dallas, Texas.

As seen in "Be My Better Half", Maggie is fluent in American Sign Language, enough to understand and translate for a deaf patient.

When Maggie got cancer and attended a chemotherapy ward, she met a fellow cancer patient, Ben Campbell. The two married in early 2020 but divorced four years later after she got close to ex-boyfriend Grant, the father of her daughter Vanessa whom she had put up for adoption.

=== Dr. Ava Bekker ===
Ava Bekker
- First appearance: CM: "Love Hurts" (episode 2.23)
- Last appearance: CM: "Never Going Back to Normal" (episode 5.01)
- Created by: Matt Olmstead
- Portrayed by: Norma Kuhling

In-universe information
- Gender: Female
- Title(s): Fellow of Cardiothoracic Surgery, Chicago Med (season 3); Attending Cardiothoracic Surgeon, Chicago Med (seasons 4–5)
- Occupation: Cardiothoracic surgeon
- Significant others: Connor Rhodes (ex-boyfriend); Cornelius Rhodes (one night stand; deceased)
- Status: Deceased

Portrayed by Norma Kuhling

Dr. Ava Bekker is a cardiothoracic surgeon from South Africa with whom Dr. Rhodes begins to butt heads on professional boundaries.

In season 4, Ava becomes an attending in the CT department. She and Dr. Rhodes also have a brief romantic relationship, which ends poorly.

Over the course of the fourth season, Bekker successfully solicits a donation from Rhodes’ father to fund his hybrid OR project, becomes exposed to HIV when Rhodes’ scalpel cuts her hand during an operation, and performs a valve replacement on Rhodes’ father, which subsequently fails. Rhodes becomes convinced that Bekker has deliberately manipulated events to ensure that the pair remain involved in each other's lives, although it appears throughout the season that he is simply paranoid, with all incidents having innocent explanations.

However, when Rhodes' father dies suddenly of an insulin overdose while recovering from a second surgery, Bekker tells Connor that his father will no longer get in the way of their relationship, apparently believing that his father was the only thing keeping them apart. Connor, appalled by this, rejects her, telling her it is too late, so she furiously leaves.

In season 5, when the authorities and Dr. Isidore Latham start an investigation of Cornelius' suspicious death, she tries to get her revenge on Connor by suggesting to them that Connor might be his father's killer. Realizing what she's doing, Connor starts arguing with her more and more, until Latham, seeing their animosity declares he's close to solving the case; therefore, Bekker admits to Connor that she murdered his father in an effort to win him back and then commits suicide by slitting her own throat with a scalpel. A horrified Connor and Latham attempt to save her but are too late.

=== Dr. Crockett Marcel ===
Crockett Marcel
- First appearance: CM: "Never Going Back to Normal" (episode 5.01)
- Last appearance: CM: "I Think I Know You, But Do I Really?" (episode 9.13)
- Created by: Matt Olmstead
- Portrayed by: Dominic Rains

In-universe information
- Full name: Darioush Jahanbani
- Alias: Crockett Marcel
- Title(s): Attending Physician in General Surgery, Chicago Med (S7) Surgical Resident in General Surgery, Chicago Med (S5)
- Occupation: Trauma Surgeon
- Family: Mr. Marcel (father); Mrs. Marcel (mother); Unnamed sister Unnamed grandmother
- Spouse: Claire Bassett (ex-wife)
- Significant others: Natalie Manning (ex-girlfriend); April Sexton (kissed)
- Children: Harper Marcel (daughter; deceased)

Portrayed by Dominic Rains

Dr. Crockett Marcel is introduced as a Fourth Year Resident/later an Attending Physician in General Surgery who eventually replaces Dr. Connor Rhodes after he resigns from Med for a fresh start. He gets suspicious of Phillip Davis after noticing that Dr. Natalie Manning didn't have a wedding ring on her when she was brought in the ER after being hit by a car. He later revealed this to Will Halstead. He had a daughter, Harper, who died from leukemia at one year of age. He might be a double board certified surgeon as he is introduced as a trauma surgeon twice, but is never mentioned.

=== Dr. Dean Archer ===
Dean Archer
- Chicago Med character
- First appearance: CM: "Fathers and Mothers, Daughters and Sons" (episode 6.08)
- Created by: Matt Olmstead
- Portrayed by: Steven Weber

In-universe information
- Gender: Male
- Title(s): Chief of Emergency Medicine, Chicago Med (seasons 7–10); Attending Physician in General Surgery, Chicago Med (seasons 10-present)
- Occupation: Doctor; United States Navy Reservist (Captain)
- Family: Unnamed mother Paul (maternal uncle)
- Spouses: Leanne Archer (ex-wife; deceased)
- Significant others: Margot Collins (ex-girlfriend); Hannah Asher (one-night-stand)
- Children: Sean Archer (son); Mabel Archer (daughter)
- Nationality: American
- Date of birth: 1961

Portrayed by Steven Weber

Dr. Dean Archer is an Attending Physician and board-certified in Trauma Surgery. He was Dr. Ethan Choi's Senior Medical Officer in the Navy. He holds the rank of Captain. He also has a drug-addicted son, Sean.

In S6 E09 he says to Dr, Manning, "I also happen to be a board-certified surgeon myself".

In S7 E00, Sharon Goodwin offers him the Interim Chief of Emergency Medicine.

=== Dr. Dylan Scott ===
Dylan Scott
- First appearance: CM: "You Can't Always Trust What You See" (episode 7.01)
- Last appearance: CM: "How Do You Begin to Count the Losses" (episode 8.01)
- Created by: Matt Olmstead
- Portrayed by: Guy Lockard

In-universe information
- Full name: Dylan Scott
- Gender: Male
- Title(s): Resident in Emergency Medicine/pediatrics, Chicago Med (season 7)
- Occupation: Doctor (pediatrician)
- Family: Reginald Scott (father); Zora Scott (sister)

Portrayed by Guy Lockard

Dr. Dylan Scott is a Pediatric Emergency Medicine Physician. He is former Chicago police officer who switched careers to medicine.

=== Dr. Stevie Hammer ===
Stevie Hammer
- First appearance: CM: "You Can't Always Trust What You See" (episode 7.01)
- Last appearance: CM: "All The Things That Could Have Been" (episode 7.14)
- Created by: Matt Olmstead
- Portrayed by: Kristen Hager

In-universe information
- Full name: Stephanie Hammer
- Gender: Female
- Title(s): Attending Physician, Chicago Med Emergency Department (seasons 7)
- Occupation: Doctor (emergency medicine)
- Family: Terri Hammer (mother)
- Spouse: Andrew Jacobson (ex-husband)

Portrayed by Kristen Hager

Dr. Stephanie "Stevie" Hammer is an Attending Physician in Emergency Medicine who went to med school with Will Halstead.

=== Dr. Hannah Asher ===
Hannah Asher
- Chicago Med character
- First appearance: CM: "Leave the Choice to Solomon" (episode 5.12)
- Created by: Matt Olmstead
- Portrayed by: Jessy Schram

In-universe information
- Gender: Female
- Title(s): OBGYN Attending Physician (seasons 7-present)
- Occupation: Obstetrician-Gynecologist
- Family: Mark Asher (father); Unnamed mother (deceased); Elizabeth Asher (sister); Matt Asher (brother)
- Significant others: Mitchell Ripley (ex-boyfriend); Will Halstead (ex-boyfriend); Dean Archer (one-night-stand); Nick Dunn (kissed)
- Children: Mabel Archer (daughter)
- Nationality: American
- Date of birth: February 14, 1986

Portrayed by Jessy Schram

Dr. Hannah Asher is an Attending Physician and Board Certified obstetrician-gynaecologist in the Emergency Department. She was first introduced to the Chicago franchise in the Chicago Med episode "Leave the Choice to Solomon".

In S9 E03, she mentions to a patient that she is a "Board Certified OB/GYN". In S7 E16, Sharon Goodwin mentions that she is an experienced Attending Physician and has completed an Emergency Medicine Fellowship.

=== Dr. Mitchell Ripley ===
Mitchell Ripley
- Chicago Med character
- First appearance: CM: "Row Row Row Your Boat on a Rocky Sea" (episode 9.01)
- Created by: Matt Olmstead
- Portrayed by: Luke Mitchell

In-universe information
- Full name: Mitchell Ripley
- Nickname: Mitch
- Gender: Male
- Title(s): Attending Physician, Chicago Med Emergency Department
- Occupation: Doctor
- Family: Unnamed father Unnamed mother
- Significant others: Caitlin Lenox (girlfriend); Hannah Asher (ex-girlfriend); Sadie Smith (ex-girlfriend)
- Nationality: American

Portrayed by Luke Mitchell

Dr. Mitchell "Mitch" Ripley is an Attending Physician in Emergency Medicine. He has a past with Dr. Daniel Charles.

=== Dr. Caitlin Lenox ===
Caitlin Lenox
- Chicago Med character
- First appearance: CM: "Sink or Swim" (episode 10.01)
- Created by: Matt Olmstead
- Portrayed by: Sarah Ramos

In-universe information
- Nickname: Catie
- Gender: Female
- Title(s): Chief of Emergency Medicine, Trauma Surgeon, Chicago Med
- Occupation: Doctor; United States Army Special Forces (pre-series)
- Family: Franklin Lenox (father; deceased); Valerie Lenox (mother; deceased); Kip Lenox (brother)
- Significant others: Mitchell Ripley (boyfriend); Nicholas Hayes (kissed)
- Nationality: American

Portrayed by Sarah Ramos

Dr. Caitlin Lenox is a Trauma Surgeon and Attending Physician in Emergency Medicine.

=== Dr. John Frost ===
John Frost
- Chicago Med character
- First appearance: CM: "Sink or Swim" (episode 10.01)
- Created by: Matt Olmstead
- Portrayed by: Darren Barnet

In-universe information
- Full name: Jonathan Michael Frost
- Gender: Male
- Title(s): Attending in Emergency Medicine/pediatrics, Chicago Med
- Occupation: Doctor; Actor (pre-series)
- Family: James Frost (father; deceased); Celeste Frost (mother)
- Significant other: Naomi Howard (girlfriend)
- Nationality: American

Portrayed by Darren Barnet

Dr. John Frost is an attending in emergency medicine specializing in pediatrics.

== Recurring ==
Name	Portrayed by	Seasons											
Name	Portrayed by	1	2	3	4	5	6	7	8	9	10	11	12
Nurse Doris Perez	Lorena Diaz	Recurring											
Dr. Marty Peterson	Jeremy Shouldis	Recurring											Guest
Paramedic Courtney	Courtney Rioux	Recurring											
Dr. Sam Abrams	Brennan Brown	Recurring								Guest	Recurring		
Paramedic Cesar	Cesar Jaime	Recurring								Guest		Recurring	
Paramedic Desmond	Desmond Gray	Recurring											
Peter Kalmick	Marc Grapey	Recurring					Guest	Recurring					Guest
Noah Sexton	Roland Buck III	Recurring					Guest		Guest				
Nurse Dina	Amanda Marcheschi	Recurring					Guest	Recurring		Guest			
Leah	Tonray Ho	Recurring						Recurring					
Nurse Beth	Mia Park	Recurring				Guest							
Joey Thomas	Peter Mark Kendall	Recurring		Guest									
Paramedic Chout	Alex Weisman	Recurring		Guest									
Tate Jenkins	Deron J. Powell	Recurring											
Madeline Gastern	Jodi Kingsley	Recurring	Guest			Recurring	Guest		Recurring	Guest			
Dr. Lonnie Richardson	Nora Dunn	Recurring	Guest					Recurring					
Nurse Tanya	Camille Robinson	Recurring		Guest									
Barry Lindheim	David Parkes	Recurring		Guest						Guest		Guest	
Dr. Olga Patchefsky	Amy J. Carle	Recurring				Recurring	Guest	Recurring	Guest				
Cornelius Rhodes	D. W. Moffett	Recurring		Recurring									
Vicki Glass	Cynthia Addai-Robinson	Recurring			Recurring								
Helen	Annie Potts	Recurring											
Dr. David Downey	Gregg Henry	Recurring											
Dr. Sam Zanetti	Julie Berman	Recurring											
Claire Rhodes	Chrisstina Brucato	Recurring											
Jeff Clarke	Jeff Hephner	Guest	Recurring										
Nina Shore	Patti Murin	Guest	Recurring		Guest								
Nurse Melissa	Melissa Canciller	Guest			Guest	Recurring					Guest		
Security Guard Earl	C. Anthony Jackson	Guest		Recurring									
Nurse Hank	Carlos Rogelio Diaz		Recurring	Guest	Recurring			Guest					
Dr. Isidore Latham	Ato Essandoh		Recurring				Guest						
Nurse Monique	Casey Tutton		Recurring										
Robin Charles	Mekia Cox		Recurring			Guest					Recurring		
Paramedica Naïma	Naima Hebrail Kidjo		Recurring	Guest	Recurring	Guest							
Stanley Stohl	Eddie Jemison		Recurring		Guest								
Dr. Leah Bardovi	Shay Rose Aljadeff		Recurring	Guest									
Bert Goodwin	Gregory Alan Williams		Guest			Recurring	Guest			Recurring	Guest	Recurring	
Nurse Belinda	Gail Shapiro			Recurring			Guest			Guest			
Dr. Heather Singh	Puja Mohindra			Recurring		Guest							
Emily Choi	Arden Cho			Recurring									
PICU Nurse Sandra	Patricia Kane			Recurring	Guest		Guest				Guest		
Dr. Robert Haywood	Michel Gill			Recurring	Guest								
Dr. Maia Frisch	Emma Duncan			Recurring		Guest							
Dr. James Lanik	Nate Santana			Guest	Recurring			Guest					
Officer Anti Rosado	Elena Marisa Flores			Guest	Recurring					Recurring	Guest		
COO Gwen Garrett	Heather Headley			Guest	Recurring		Guest						
Dr. Mark Cameron	Walter Cooper			Guest					Recurring	Guest			
Ben Campbell	Charles Malik Whitfield				Recurring			Guest	Recurring	Guest			
Elsa Curry	Molly Bernard				Recurring								
Caroline Charles	Paula Newsome				Recurring								
Phillip Davis	Ian Harding				Recurring								
Dr. Amy Watkins	Julie Proudfoot				Recurring		Guest						
Nurse June	June Schreiner				Guest			Recurring					
Margaret Charles	Deanna Dunagan				Guest						Guest		
Nurse Trini	Marie Tredway					Recurring							
Paramedic Juliette	Sarah Brooks					Recurring	Guest	Recurring					Guest
Nurse Maya	Kristina Valada-Viars					Recurring	Guest						
Anna Charles	Hannah Alligood					Guest	Recurring	Guest			Recurring	Guest	
Michael Goodwin	Hampton Fluker					Guest	Recurring			Guest		Recurring	
Dr. Asha Mallick	Rasika Ranganathan					Guest		Guest	Recurring	Guest		Recurring	
Michelle Abrams	Emma Ishta					Guest			Guest				
Vanessa Taylor	Asjha Cooper						Recurring						
Nurse Nancy	Lynette Li						Recurring						
Dr. Sabeena Virani	Tehmina Sunny						Recurring						
Carol Conte	Margaret Colin						Recurring						
Milena Jovanovic	Riley Voelkel							Recurring	Guest				
Lt Reginald Scott	Curtiss Cook							Recurring	Guest				
Dr. Pamela Blake	Sarah Rafferty							Recurring	Guest				
Avery Quinn	Johanna Braddy							Recurring	Guest				
Dr. Matt Cooper	Michael Rady							Recurring					
Terri Hammer	Bonita Friedericy							Recurring					
Nurse Trisha	Renelle Nicole							Recurring		Guest			
Carmen Walker	Kellee Stewart							Recurring					
Grant Young	Wayne T. Carr							Guest	Recurring				
Paramedic Matt	Matthew Isler							Guest	Recurring				
Dr. Justin Morris	Lee Jones							Guest		Recurring	Guest		
Tara Goodwin	Nicolette Robinson							Guest		Recurring	Guest	Recurring	
Sean Archer	Luigi Sottile								Recurring		Guest		
Kai Tanaka-Reed	Devin Kawaoka								Recurring		Guest		Recurring
Liliana Wapniarski	Alet Taylor								Recurring		Guest		
Dr. Nellie Cuevas	Lilah Richcreek Estrada								Recurring	Guest	Recurring		
Jack Dayton	Sasha Roiz								Recurring				
Paramedic Adia	Adia Alli								Recurring				
Dr. Grace Song	T.V. Carpio								Recurring				
Dr. George Thomas	Stan Shaw								Recurring				
Dr. justin Lieu	Ivan Shaw								Recurring				
Dr. Loren Johnson	Henderson Wade								Guest	Recurring			
Dr. Dennis Washington	John Earl Jelks									Recurring			
Dr. Zola Ahmad	Sophia Ali									Recurring			
Dr. Naomi Howard	Ashlei Sharpe Chestnut									Recurring			
Robert Sullivan	Daniel Dorr									Recurring			
Dr. Margo Collins	Beth Lacke									Recurring	Guest		
Jackie Nelson	Natalie Zea									Guest	Recurring		
Lynne Murphy	Hope Lauren									Guest	Recurring	Guest	
Miranda Lewis	Orlagh Cassidy										Recurring		
Paramedic Corey	David Berman										Recurring	Guest	
Dr. Nicholas Hayes	Brendan Hines										Recurring		
Ainsley Towne	Jessalyn Gilsig										Recurring	Guest	
Kip Lenox	Logan Miller										Recurring		
Lizzy Asher	Erin Anderson										Recurring		
Nurse Graysen	Vena Howard										Recurring	Guest	
Nurse Kacy	Kim Quindlen										Guest	Recurring	
Sadie Smith	Holly Curran										Guest	Recurring	
Nurse Kacy	Kim Quindlen										Guest	Recurring	
Paramedic Evie	Lauren Powell (Lauren Shadid from S12)										Guest	Recurring	
Dr. Jennifer Kingston	Merrin Dungey											Recurring	
David Goodwin	Gbenga Akinnagbe											Recurring	Guest
Dr. Theo Rabari	Manish Dayal											Recurring	
Ian Walcott	Justin Prentice											Recurring	
Howie Mankiewicz	Mark Linn-Baker											Recurring	
James Frost	David Costabile											Recurring	
Celeste Frost	Tamlyn Tomita											Recurring	
Dr. Vera Lovell	Abby Corrigan											Recurring	
Mallory Sloan	Rebecca Breeds												Recurring
Dr. Annie Wu	An-Li Bogan												Recurring

=== Family members ===
- Noah Sexton (Roland Buck III) is an emergency medicine resident and younger brother of April. It is implied in a conversation Severide had with April that Noah is the "golden boy" of the family who got to go to medical school with his sister's financial assistance despite April being the more academically inclined of the siblings. He has a torrid start to his rotation at Chicago Med and is quickly intimidated after following the residents on shift at the Emergency Department. He resorts to using Reese's ideas to earn Dr. Choi's favor, but she finds out about it and gives him a cold shoulder. He is fired by Dr. Choi after he committed a medical negligence.
- Cornelius Rhodes (D. W. Moffett) was the father of Dr. Connor Rhodes. He runs the family business Dolen Rhodes, a high-end department store started by his father. His wife Elizabeth died at some point before the pilot. As the only son and heir to the family fortune, Connor was expected to follow his father into the family business but eschews it for medicine. Elizabeth's death and Connor's choice to go into medicine lead to a bitter estrangement between father and son. In season 4, he was hospitalized for a heart failure, but later was killed when Dr. Ava Bekker overdosed him with insulin. Connor learned the truth about his parents' relationship—and that his mother wasn't the ideal he made her out to be in his grief over her death—just too late to reconcile with Cornelius.
- Claire Rhodes (Christina Brucato) is the estranged sister of Connor. In season 1 she takes her co-worker and friend Russell to the hospital after he gets impaled from broken chandelier shards after he saves her from the falling chandelier. After Connor takes Russell into surgery she and her brother talk, which she still angrily blames him for leaving her with their father and eventually dismisses him, telling Connor to take care of her friend. Later she and Connor speak to their father about using SNAP on Russell, which she insists on paying for it but Cornelius disagrees.
- Robin Charles (Mekia Cox) is Dr. Charles' daughter, also a doctor, who worked as an epidemiologist in the Med during season 2 and had a relationship with Dr. Rhodes. She left to be with her mother in Minneapolis in season 3, but returned in season 4 episode "We Hold These Truths".
- Anna Charles (Scarlett Wand in Season 2 and Hannah Riley in Season 5 and 6) is Dr. Charles' second daughter with his second ex-wife Susan. She is a teenage girl who deals with typical teenage problems. In Season 6, she suffers a pregnancy scare and her father stands by her side. After a custody battle, her mother wins but Anna didn't want to leave her father, forcing Daniel to tell Susan of the pregnancy and Susan allows Daniel to retain custody.
- Helen Manning (Annie Potts) is the mother-in-law of Dr. Natalie Manning and paternal grandmother of Owen. She is on good terms with Natalie, having been there for her since the death of her son Jeff and acts as an occasional babysitter for her grandson. Helen was initially disapproving of Will but had to rely on him to keep her family in Chicago.
- Emily Choi (Arden Cho) is the sister of Dr. Ethan Choi. Unlike her brother, Emily is much more free-spirited but her reckless behavior has landed her into trouble with alcohol and drugs. Dr. Choi clashes with his girlfriend April over how to deal with Emily. In season 4 she starts dating Bernard Kim (C. S. Lee), a much older man whom she had met at her AA meeting. She then tells Ethan that she's pregnant with Bernard's child and months later she gives birth to a boy which she names him Vincent after her and Ethan's late grandfather.
- Robert Haywood (Michael Gill) is an Astrophysics professor and the father of Dr. Sarah Reese. Sensing his possessive behavior, Dr. Charles investigated him and discovered some of his students went missing, leading him to realized that he might be a serial killer. After finding more evidence, Dr. Charles confronted Robert, causing him to have a heart attack from recent treatment for it. After he was treated and imprisoned, Sarah decided to leave Chicago to distant herself from her father and Dr. Charles.
- Patrick "Pat" Halstead (Louis Herthum) is the late father of Dr. Will Halstead and Detective Jay Halstead. He first appeared in the Season 2 episode "Generation Gap" when Jay calls Will from their childhood house about Pat's heart condition. Pat was later sent for open heart surgery at the end of the episode. According to the brothers, Pat disapproved of their career choices, leading to their estrangement for many years. Will finally reconciled with him at the end of "Generation Gap". Pat died in the crossover episode "When to Let Go" of complications caused by smoke inhalation from the fire.
- Owen Manning (Ari Morgan) is the son of Natalie Manning. His father Jeff was part of the U.S. Rangers and died in Afghanistan. Ever since, Natalie has raised Owen as a single parent, with occasional help from his grandmother Helen.

=== Gaffney Chicago Medical Center staff and personnel ===
Recurring

- Dr. Samuel Abrams (Brennan Brown) is a Division Chief of Neurosurgery. He is called in when a patient admitted into the ED requires neuro-surgery or consult and is known for his blunt, pessimistic outlook. It's been mentioned in a couple of episodes that he is the "Chief of Neurosurgery".
- Dr. Samantha "Sam" Zanetti (Julie Berman) is an Attending Physician in Trauma Surgery. She befriended Dr. Rhodes, a Trauma Surgery Fellow, and they started dating. However they break up as his fellowship was consuming more of his time and she tells him that she would not make him choose between her or his mentor Dr. Downey.
- Dr. Kendra Perrington (Karen Aldridge) is an Attending Physician and a Board Certified Critical Care Specialist. She was one of several characters who moved over to Chicago Med after appearing on Chicago Fire as a recurring character.
- Joseph Thomas (Peter Mark Kendall) is a lab tech in pathology ("the basement") who dates Dr. Sarah Reese from seasons one to two. He initially convinces her to go into pathology and was disappointed when she changes her mind. They initially stop seeing each other for a while as they had nothing in common to talk about. They rekindle their relationship after Dr. Reese realizes that she should make the first move to get to know Joey's interests outside of work.
- Jeff Clarke (Jeff Hephner) is a medical student currently on rotation at Chicago Med. He was previously in the United States Marine Corps and then a lieutenant in the Chicago Fire Department. An injury on the job forced him to change careers and he went back to school. At some point during his military service, he met and befriended Dr. Manning's husband, who was also named Jeff. The character was reintroduced in a brief scene during the season 1 finale where he reveals that he is now divorced from his wife Lisa.
- Dr. Nina Shore (Patti Murin) is an Attending Physician in Pathology who briefly dates Dr. Will Halstead in season two.
- Dr. Isidore Latham (Ato Essandoh) is the new Attending Physician/later Chief of Cardiothoracic Surgery brought in to replace the late Dr. Downey. He bluntly tells Dr. Rhodes at their very first meeting that the latter was not his first choice fellow and only obliged after being told to do so by the board. A devout practicing Orthodox Jew, he does not work on the Sabbath except in a medical emergency. Dr. Rhodes intensely disliked him for his bluntness and seemingly lack of tact but those characteristics are eventually explained by the fact that he was on the autism spectrum. However he appears to aware of the fact that his lack of social skills was the result of autism and seeks Dr. Charles' expert opinion on how to improve his social skills. He later, reluctantly, confides in Dr. Rhodes about his autism and the latter softens his approach and would take over "PR duties" (e.g. negotiating roster duties with scrub nurses) when necessary. He was instrumental in discovering evidence that Dr. Ava Bekker murdered Cornelius Rhodes, which led to her suicide.
- Dr. Stanley Stohl (Eddie Jemison) is the former Chief of Emergency Medicine (Dr. Choi's predecessor) who earned the nickname "The Troll" from the ED staff for his sarcastic tone and bluntness.
- Dr. Jason Wheeler (Jurgen Hooper) is an emergency medicine resident introduced in the season 2 premiere. He had a drinking problem, which was picked up on by several of his colleagues. In the episode "Monday Mourning" he commits suicide by walking off the roof of the hospital.
- Dr. Leah Bardovi (Shiri Aljadeff) is a new Cardiothoracic Surgery Resident working alongside Drs. Rhodes and Latham.
- Nurse Doris Perez (Lorena Diaz) is an ED Nurse
- Nurse Dina Garston (Amanda Marcheschi) is a Critical Care Nurse
- Dr. Maia Frisch (Emma Duncan) is a Pediatric Cardiologist in the hospital
- Peter Kalmick (Marc Grapey): A lawyer that represents the hospital's legal department and often butt heads with Goodwin and the doctors. His husband represented Sharon during her divorce (season 2, episode 5 "Extreme Measures").
- Elsa Curry (Molly Bernard) is an intelligent, serious but socially awkward third- (and later fourth-) year medical student working in the E/R, initially shadowing Dr. Charles and later with doctors Manning and/or Halstead. In Season 5, Elsa appears to have a crush on Will.

== Crossover characters ==
=== Chicago P.D. ===
- Detective Kim Burgess (Marina Squerciati) is a Chicago Police Department detective from the Intelligence Unit.
- Detective Erin Lindsay (Sophia Bush) is a CPD detective from the Intelligence Unit, based at the 21st District.
- Detective Jay Halstead (Jesse Lee Soffer) is a fellow CPD detective and partner of Erin Lindsay in the Intelligence Unit. He is also the older brother of Dr. Will Halstead. The character generally appears on the show as part of an investigation into a patient. The brothers are close but had drifted apart as Jay still had some lingering bitterness over the fact that Will was not around when their mother was dying of cancer. A former Army Ranger, Jay is also friends with Dr. Ethan Choi, having bonded over their shared combat experiences. Will once expressed regret that he was not around when Jay came home from his deployment and was in dire need of familial support.

=== Chicago Fire ===
- Paramedic in Charge Sylvie Brett (Kara Killmer) is a paramedic from Ambulance 61 based out of Firehouse 51. As a first responder she often crosses paths with the staff in the Emergency Department.
- Paramedic Allen Chout (Alex Weisman) is a paramedic in the CFD. He was previously at Ambulance 61 on temporary duty to cover for the lack of manpower.
- Former Firefighter/Paramedic in Charge Gabriela Dawson (Monica Raymund) (seasons 1–3) is a paramedic on Ambulance 61 and previously a firefighter on Truck 81 who leaves Chicago to go to Puerto Rico for relief work.
