= Chicago Med season 8 =

Chicago Med
- Season 8
- Chicago Med Season 8 DVD cover
- Showrunners: Andrew Schneider; Diane Frolov
- No. of episodes: 22

Release
- Original network: NBC
- Original release: September 21, 2022 – May 24, 2023

Season chronology
- ← Previous; Season 7 Next → Season 9

The eighth season of Chicago Med, an American medical drama television series with executive producer Dick Wolf, and producers Michael Brandt, Derek Haas, Peter Jankowski, Andrew Schneider and Diane Frolov, was ordered on February 27, 2020. The season premiered on September 21, 2022 and concluded on May 24, 2023. The season contained 22 episodes. Storylines revolved around Gaffney's new tech genius CEO, a controversial AI system for surgical procedures, and the final appearances by ED Chief Dr. Ethan Choi (Brian Tee), Dr. Dylan Scott (Guy Lockard) and Dr. Will Halstead (Nick Gehlfuss).

== Cast ==
=== Main characters ===
- Nick Gehlfuss as Dr. William Halstead, Attending Physician in Emergency Medicine
- Brian Tee as LCDR Dr. Ethan Choi, Attending Emergency Physician/Chief of the ED (episodes 1–9)
- Marlyne Barrett as Maggie Campbell, RN, ED Charge Nurse
- S. Epatha Merkerson as Sharon Goodwin, Chief of Patient and Medical Services
- Oliver Platt as Dr. Daniel Charles, Chief of Psychiatry
- Dominic Rains as Dr. Crockett Marcel, Attending Physician in General Surgery
- Guy Lockard as Dr. Dylan Scott, Emergency Medicine/Pediatrics Resident (episode 1)
- Steven Weber (Note: Weber was credited as "Special Guest Star" in all appearances.) as Dr. Dean Archer, Attending Physician in Trauma Surgery
- Jessy Schram as Dr. Hannah Asher, OBGYN Attending Physician

=== Recurring characters ===
- Asjha Cooper as Dr. Vanessa Taylor, Emergency Medicine Resident (episodes 1–6)
- Sasha Roiz as Jack Dayton, an entrepreneur, founder of Dayton Corp and inventor of the OR 2.0
- Brennan Brown as Dr. Samuel Abrams, Chief of Neurosurgery
- Marc Grapey as Peter Kalmick, Head of Gaffney's Legal Team
- Lilah Richcreek Estrada as Dr. Nellie Cuevas, Psychiatry Fellow Physician, a DACA recipient
- Devin Kawaoka as Dr. Kai Tanaka-Reed, First Year Resident in General Surgery
- Conor Perkins as Dr. Zach Hudgins, First Year Resident in Emergency Medicine
- Wayne T. Carr as Grant Young, Maggie's ex and Vanessa's biological father
- Ivan Shaw as Dr. Justin Lieu, former Search & Rescue, now Resident in Emergency Medicine
- Charles Malik Whitfield as Ben Campbell, Maggie's husband
- Luigi Sottile as Sean Archer, Dean's incarcerated addict son
- T. V. Carpio as Dr. Grace Song, installed by Dayton Corp to improve ED efficiency through tech
- Lorena Diaz as ED Nurse Doris
- Marie Tredway as ED Nurse Trinidad “Trini” Campos
- Lynnette Li as ED Nurse Nancy
- Mishael Morgan as Dr. Petra Dupre, expert on the OR 2.0
- Alet Taylor as Liliana Wapniarski, a Polish immigrant who is a housekeeper at Gaffney
- Kristof Konrad as Pawel Wapniarski, Liliana's lowlife brother
- John Henry Ward as David Sullivan, a teenage schizophrenic treated repeatedly by Dr. Charles
- Hannah Alligood as Anna Charles, college-bound daughter of Dr. Charles
- Henderson Wade as Dr. Loren Johnson, a medical helicopter pilot
- Stan Shaw as Dr. George Thomas, Gaffney's new board member promoted by Jack Dayton
- Jeremy Shouldis as Dr. Marty Peterson, an anesthesiologist at Gaffney

=== Guest stars ===
- Yaya DaCosta as April Sexton, Nurse Practitioner (episodes 1, 5, 9)
- Angela Wong Carbone as Jessa Rinaldi, a product rep for Vasik Labs (episode 1)
- Riley Voelkel as Milena "Jo" Jovanovic, an undercover police officer and Dr. Scott's girlfriend (episode 1)
- Curtiss Cook as Reginald Scott, Dr. Scott's father, a lieutenant in the Chicago PD (episode 1)
- Sarah Rafferty as Dr. Pamela Blake, Chief of Transplant Surgery (episode 1)
- Johanna Braddy as Avery Quinn, Dr. Blake's daughter, a malpractice attorney (episode 4)
- Johnny M. Wu as Dr. Randall Shentu, Gaffney's PR rep (episodes 6, 12)
- Roland Buck III as Dr. Noah Sexton (episode 9)
- Torrey DeVitto as Dr. Natalie Manning (episode 22)

=== Crossover characters ===
- Taylor Kinney as Lieutenant Kelly Severide
- Kara Killmer as Paramedic Sylvie Brett
- David Eigenberg as Lieutenant Christopher Herrmann
- Alberto Rosende as Firefighter Blake Gallo
- Tracy Spiridakos as Detective Hailey Upton
- Marina Squerciati as Officer Kim Burgess
- LaRoyce Hawkins as Officer Kevin Atwater
- Joe Minoso as Firefighter Joe Cruz
- Randy Flagler as Firefighter Harold Capp
- Anthony Ferraris as Firefighter Tony Ferraris

== Episodes ==
No. overall	No. in season	Title	Directed by	Written by	Original release date	Prod. code	U.S. viewers (millions)
142	1	"How Do You Begin to Count the Losses"	Michael Pressman	Diane Frolov & Andrew Schneider	September 21, 2022	801	6.59
Following the season 7 finale, Will and Dylan are saved from the apartment fire. However, Dylan's girlfriend Jo passes away from her injuries, leaving Dylan devastated. The apartment building's arsonist is later arrested. Meanwhile, Ethan gets a surprise visit.
143	2	"(Caught Between) The Wrecking Ball and the Butterfly"	Nicole Rubio	Teleplay by : Stephen Hootstein; Story by : Stephen Hootstein & Danny Weiss	September 28, 2022	802	6.49
Will cares for a mother and her son after a car accident, but the mother refuses treatment. Drs. Choi and Archer deal with an ALS patient.
144	3	"Winning the Battle, but Still Losing the War"	Charles Carroll	Teleplay by : Meridith Friedman & Ryan Michael Johnson; Story by : Meridith Friedman & Gabrielle Fulton Ponder	October 5, 2022	803	6.75
Dr. Charles talks to and tries to help a patient dealing with schizophrenia. Meanwhile, Dr. Marcel treats a patient that has a spinal injury. Dr. Asher is upset at Dr. Choi for lying to her when a patient requests a different doctor due to her past.
145	4	"The Apple Doesn't Fall Far from the Teacher"	Nicole Rubio	Daniel Sinclair	October 12, 2022	804	6.58
Dr. Marcel helps a train conductor trapped inside the train after it derails inside the underground station. Meanwhile, Dr. Charles takes his therapist to the hospital after he collapses on a coffee table during a session. Mrs. Goodwin informs Dr. Halstead that there is a shortage of a medicine he needs to save his patient's life; Dr. Vanessa Taylor tells Dr. Halstead there is another way to get the medicine, but he refuses, fearing both will lose their medical licenses and go to jail. Vanessa gets the drug from a dealer and they give the medicine to their patient and save her life, agreeing to keep it a secret.
146	5	"Yep, This is the World We Live In"	X. Dean Lim	Eli Talbert	October 19, 2022	805	6.88
Ethan is surprised to see April again after she brings a patient to the ED for treatment. Meanwhile, a patient goes berserk in the ED, injuring Dr. Archer; it is the dealer Vanessa purchased the drugs from in the previous episode. As he had OD'ed on tainted drugs, they have to inform the police and the hospital finds out that they bought drugs illegally and gave them to a patient; Mrs. Goodwin tells them that, due to extenuating circumstances, they were let off. Dr. Marcel completes a lung transplant for the conductor injured during the crash in the previous episode whose lungs were damaged after inhaling lithium from the train batteries.
147	6	"Mamma Said There Would Be Days Like This"	Tim Busfield	Gabriel L. Feinberg & Lily Dahl	November 2, 2022	806	6.58
Dr. Marcel is being interviewed by the media after saving the train conductor twice from the underground train derailment. Dr. Charles treats a patient who is going through a tough time after recently giving birth. Dr. Halstead's patient wants Dr. Marcel to perform surgery on her arm, but he leaves during the procedure to deal with a VIP patient, something for which Dr. Halstead scolds him when complications arise. Dr. Vanessa Taylor accepts a job in the Philippines.
148	7	"The Clothes Make the Man... Or Do They?"	Anthony Nardolillo	Stephen Hootstein & Danny Weiss	November 9, 2022	807	5.98
The doctors and nurses are out of scrubs due to them being in the laundry. Dr. Halstead and Dr. Asher deliver a baby. Dr. Archer is shocked to see his son in the hospital after his son was stabbed in prison; the inmate who stabbed him is also brought in to the ED. A lady who had a transplant a year ago suffers from a psychotic episode. As the anti-psychotic drugs dull her mind, her transplanted organ is removed.
149	8	"Everyone's Fighting a Battle You Know Nothing About"	Jonathan Brown	Meridith Friedman & Gabrielle Fulton Ponder	November 16, 2022	808	6.73
Maggie receives an invite to Ethan and April's wedding. Asher and Cuevas tend to an undocumented rape victim. Grant takes Maggie on a ride in his restored car and they are involved in a crash after a truck hits Grant's car. Dr. Choi and Dr. Charles take a look at a patient's medical history and find out that the patient was in a different hospital for a medical fraud procedure and that his real illness was not treated.
150	9	"This Could Be the Start of Something New"	Nicole Rubio	Diane Frolov & Andrew Schneider	December 7, 2022	809	6.64
Dr. Marcel is performing surgery in the new OR 2.0 and is unhappy that Jack Dayton has invited people to watch. Ethan is treating April's father in the hospital the day before the wedding. Dr. Charles asks the lady who cleans his office out for coffee. Ethan and April get married. Mrs. Goodwin receives the news that Jack Dayton has bought controlling shares of the hospital. This is Brian Tee's final appearance as Dr. Ethan Choi.
151	10	"A Little Change Might Do You Some Good"	Bethany Rooney	Daniel Sinclair & Ryan Michael Johnson	January 4, 2023	810	6.76
A man is brought into the ED following a car crash and, when he regains consciousness, asks where his pregnant wife is. Drs. Lieu and Asher go to find her, where they deliver her baby. Sharon Goodwin comforts Maggie following the previous episode when Ben found out about the car crash and decided he and Maggie should take a break. Dr. Halstead wants Jack (Chicago Med's new CEO) to visit a girl who needs life-saving surgery, but he says he is busy. However, following Dr. Halstead having a go at him, Jack cancels a meeting to visit the girl and he convinces her to have the surgery. Dr. Marcel's patient has Crohn's disease and wants to have surgery, but Dr. Marcel says it's too risky; he eventually relents and performs the surgery in 2.0.
152	11	"It Is What It Is, Until It Isn't"	Benny Boom	Teleplay by : Eli Talbert; Story by : Conor Patrick Hogan	January 11, 2023	811	6.80
Drs. Lieu and Asher are at a rock climbing gym when another climber has an accident and gets brought to the ED. Dr. Asher has a problem when a patient is wrongly flagged by a new AI system as a potential drug addict. Dr. Archer's son tells him that he is being paroled the following day. Maggie tells Dr. Halstead that her and Ben are separated.
153	12	"We All Know What They Say About Assumptions"	Carl Weathers	Gabriel L. Feinberg & Lily Dahl	January 18, 2023	812	6.95
On their way to work, Maggie & Mrs. Goodwin assist after witnessing a hit and run. Dr. Halstead deals with a young boy with strange systems and the parents are worried, as they lost another son 12 years before with similar symptoms. Drs. Marcel and Archer argue about using 2.0 and the machine gets damaged, so Jack Dayton fires Archer; Mrs. Goodwin tells Jack that, if he goes, she goes too, so he rescinds and tells Goodwin that Archer is her responsibility. Maggie goes to see Ben to try and save their marriage, but Ben is unresponsive.
154	13	"It's an Ill Wind That Blows Nobody Good"	Afia Nathaniel	Stephen Hootstein & Danny Weiss	February 15, 2023	813	6.74
A bad storm hits Chicago and they are shortstaffed, so Dr. Song is assigned to assist in the ED. The non-urgent patients are kept in the ED lobby and one of them is stabbed, the person who stabbed him found to be a mentally ill lady. Dr. Archer's son, Sean, brings a friend in with an injury. Dr. Archer runs a drug test and accuses his son of using again. On her way to the hospital, Dr. Asher sees a car which has hit the edge of a bridge; she stops to help and the car explodes, injuring her driver and damaging the vehicle. Sean hears this and goes to get them. Ben and Maggie reconcile.
155	14	"On Days Like Today... Silver Linings Become Lifelines"	Nicole Rubio	Meridith Friedman & Gabrielle Fulton Ponder	February 22, 2023	814	6.52
Marcel second guesses his judgement in OR 2.0 during a tricky surgery for a man who has cut off his hand. Hannah helps a previous patient. Sharon is introduced to someone Jack wants on the hospital board.
156	15	"Those Times You Have to Cross the Line"	Milena Govich	Daniel Sinclair & Ryan Michael Johnson	March 1, 2023	815	6.57
The cleaners go on strike and Daniel joins the picket line with Liliana. An outbreak of bedbugs is found, as the replacement cleaners are not doing their jobs. Dr. Archer operates on a woman and a huge hairball is found in her stomach. Dr. Song assists Dr. Halstead on a case.
157	16	"What You See Isn't Always What You Get"	Tim Busfield	Eli Talbert & Danny Weiss	March 22, 2023	816	6.60
A man freaks out after his wife gives birth and gets injured when he runs into the MRI room. CFD are called and have to work out how to free him. Drs. Halstead and Cuevas investigate when a girl is brought in by her worried parents. Her brother had previously died of an unexplained illness and she is now exhibiting the same symptoms, but the insurance company insists that the girl be transferred to the hospital where her brother died. At the last minute, they diagnose the illness and save her life. Dr. Archer collapses and is told that his kidneys are worse, resulting in the need for dialysis.
158	17	"Know When to Hold and When to Fold"	Brian Tee	Gabriel L. Feinberg & Lily Dahl	March 29, 2023	817	6.57
Dr. Archer's son Sean gets a job at the hospital as a valet following a recommendation from Dr. Asher.; Dr. Archer is annoyed, as he has not told Sean that he is ill. A documentary crew visits Med to film Marcel and Abrams' groundbreaking surgery but, after Miss Goodwin refused to let the camera crew interview the patient's mother, Jack Dayton bars the doctors from using OR 2.0 on subsidized patients. Drs. Halstead and Song go out for a drink.
159	18	"I Could See the Writing on the Wall"	Oz Scott	Meridith Friedman & Gabrielle Fulton Ponder	April 5, 2023	818	6.40
Dr. Archer discovers his patient has been pretending to be paralyzed, but has now really damaged his spine and needs surgery to prevent truly becoming paralyzed. Dr. Charles evaluates him for a disorder that means he wants to be paralyzed. Dr. Song's new pilot program gives the E.D. a technological facelift. Dr. Archer is to be evaluated for the transplant list. A pregnant woman comes in with her son and dies during an emergency cesarean. Miss Goodwin tries to get ahold of board members to try and stop Jack from turning Med into a for-profit hospital.
160	19	"Look Closely and You Might Hear the Truth"	Tess Malone	Stephen Hootstein & Daniel Sinclair	May 3, 2023	819	5.85
Sean Archer visits his father Dr. Dean Archer to offer a kidney and Dr. Archer confronts Dr. Asher at the hospital for telling his son about his diagnosis without his consent. The board are trying to rally support to block Jack from turning Med into a for-profit hospital and Vernon, who will be the deciding vote, collapses. He has surgery in OR 2.0 and later votes for the for-profit option. A deaf man is brought into the ED, as he is hearing voices. He sees Dr. Charles with his sister translating via ASL, but she lies in the translation and her brother refuses the medication.
161	20	"The Winds of Change Are Starting to Blow"	Nikki Taylor-Roberts	Eli Talbert & Danny Weiss	May 10, 2023	820	5.45
Building work starts at Med on a new VIP floor. The very first 2.0 patient returns, as his cancer is back so he needs an operation, but Jack has rented OR 2.0 to a rich patient. Sharon overrules Jack and tells Dr. Marcel to do the operation; whilst operating, 2.0 starts to malfunction and the patient dies. Dr. Halstead is annoyed, as he finds out that they are turning away patients without insurance. Dr. Archer starts an operation and sees a tapeworm; meanwhile, the patient's wife, who had been complaining that she could not lose weight, discovers that she is pregnant and gives birth to a boy. Sean confides in his Dad, Dr. Archer, that he likes Dr. Asher and later sees them laughing together.
162	21	"Might Feel Like It's Time for a Change"	Bethany Rooney	Meridith Friedman & Ryan Michael Johnson	May 17, 2023	821	5.61
Dr. Halstead and Dr. Song fall out over their views of Jack and the direction that he is taking Med. Dr. Marcel tries to investigate the death of his patient from the last episode, but the file is missing from the OR 2.0 server. At a press conference, Jack announces that an operation in OR 2.0 will be live streamed the next day and that the patient will be him. Maggie goes for a job interview. Dr. Archer is told that his son Sean is a match to be a kidney donor. Dr. Samuel Abrams brings his wife to Med and they discover that she is pregnant. Dr. Abrams tries to stop Dr. Asher from performing a procedure on his wife, but she refuses. Jack tells Marcel that his patient's death was his fault and that he hid the file to protect him. Dr. Halstead takes the thumb drive with the info and gives it to Dr. Song, who discovers that 2.0 made a mistake. Sean's supervisor comes to Dean to tell him that Sean did not turn up to work and that they have been unable to contact him. Liliana's almost ready to buy a house until a complication arises with her brother. She and Dr. Charles argue about the siblings' relationship.
163	22	"Does One Door Close and Another One Open?"	Nicole Rubio	Diane Frolov & Andrew Schneider	May 24, 2023	822	5.55
Drs. Halstead and Song tell Dr. Marcel that OR 2.0 made a mistake. Sean Archer is brought into the ED, as he fell off the wagon, not realizing it would make him temporarily ineligible to donate a kidney. Drs. Archer & Asher risk their jobs by conducting an operation off-book and, during the operation, Dr. Archer has to take a break due to his increasing kidney pain. After Will corrupts the technology for 2.0, Jack Dayton tells Miss Goodwin he is now financially ruined and will have to sell his share of the hospital. Will then leaves Chicago Med and reunites with Natalie Manning.: This episode marks the final appearance of Dr. Will Halstead (Nick Gehlfuss). Special surprise appearance of Natalie Manning (Torrey Devitto)

== Ratings ==
Viewership and ratings per episode of Chicago Med season 8
No.	Title	Air date	Rating (18–49)	Viewers (millions)	DVR (18–49)	DVR viewers (millions)	Total (18–49)	Total viewers (millions)
1	"How Do You Begin to Count the Losses"	September 21, 2022	0.7	6.59	—	—	—	—
2	"(Caught Between) The Wrecking Ball and the Butterfly"	September 28, 2022	0.6	6.49	—	—	—	—
3	"Winning the Battle, but Still Losing the War"	October 5, 2022	0.6	6.75	—	—	—	—
4	"The Apple Doesn't Fall Far from the Teacher"	October 12, 2022	0.6	6.58	—	—	—	—
5	"Yep, This is the World We Live In"	October 19, 2022	0.6	6.88	—	—	—	—
6	"Mamma Said There Would Be Days Like This"	November 2, 2022	0.6	6.58	—	—	—	—
7	"The Clothes Make the Man... Or Do They?"	November 9, 2022	0.6	5.92	—	—	—	—
8	"Everyone's Fighting a Battle You Know Nothing About"	November 16, 2022	0.6	6.73	—	—	—	—
9	"This Could Be the Start of Something New"	December 7, 2022	0.6	6.64	—	—	—	—
10	"A Little Change Might Do Some Good"	January 4, 2023	0.6	6.76	—	—	—	—
11	"It Is What It Is, Until It Isn't"	January 11, 2023	0.6	6.80	—	—	—	—
12	"We All Know What They Say About Assumptions"	January 18, 2023	0.7	6.95	—	—	—	—
13	"It's an Ill Wind That Blows Nobody Good"	February 15, 2023	0.6	6.74	—	—	—	—
14	"On Days Like Today... Silver Linings Become Lifelines"	February 22, 2023	0.6	6.52	—	—	—	—
15	"Those Times You Have to Cross the Line"	March 1, 2023	0.6	6.57	—	—	—	—
16	"What You See Isn't Always What You Get"	March 22, 2023	0.5	6.60	—	—	—	—
17	"Know When to Hold and When to Fold"	March 29, 2023	0.5	6.57	—	—	—	—
18	"I Could See the Writing on the Wall"	April 5, 2023	0.5	6.40	—	—	—	—
19	"Look Closely and You Might Hear the Truth"	May 3, 2023	0.5	5.85	—	—	—	—
20	"The Winds of Change Are Starting to Blow"	May 10, 2023	0.4	5.45	—	—	—	—
21	"Might Feel Like It's Time for a Change"	May 17, 2023	0.5	5.61	—	—	—	—
22	"Does One Door Close and Another One Open?"	May 24, 2023	0.4	5.55	—	—	—	—
