= Chicago Med season 9 =

Chicago Med
- Season 9
- Showrunners: Andrew Schneider; Diane Frolov
- No. of episodes: 13

Release
- Original network: NBC
- Original release: January 17 – May 22, 2024

Season chronology
- ← Previous; Season 8 Next → Season 10

The ninth season of Chicago Med, an American medical drama television series with executive producer Dick Wolf, and producers Michael Brandt, Derek Haas, Peter Jankowski, Andrew Schneider and Diane Frolov, was ordered on April 10, 2023, by NBC. The season premiered on January 17, 2024 and concluded on May 22, 2024. The season contained 13 episodes. The season was affected by strikes undertaken by the Writers Guild of America (which began on May 2 and ended on September 27) and SAG-AFTRA (which began on July 14 and ended on November 9). Storylines highlighted issues of the staff's pasts and families, marking the final appearance of Dr. Marcel (portrayed by Dominic Rains).

== Cast ==
=== Main characters ===
- Marlyne Barrett as Maggie Lockwood (formerly Campbell), RN, ED Charge Nurse
- S. Epatha Merkerson as Sharon Goodwin, Executive Director of Patient and Medical Services
- Oliver Platt as Dr. Daniel Charles, Chief of Psychiatry
- Dominic Rains as Dr. Crockett Marcel, Attending Physician in General Surgery
- Steven Weber as Dr. Dean Archer, Attending Physician and Board certified in Trauma Surgery
- Jessy Schram as Dr. Hannah Asher, Attending Physician and Board certified in OBGYN
- Luke Mitchell as Dr. Mitchell Ripley, Attending Physician in Emergency Medicine

=== Recurring characters ===
- Brennan Brown as Dr. Samuel Abrams, Chief of Neurosurgery
- Gregory Alan Williams as Albert Goodwin, Sharon's ex-husband suffering from Alzheimer's disease
- Sophia Ali as Dr. Zola Ahmad, Third Year Resident in Emergency Medicine
- Luigi Sottile as Sean Archer, Dr. Archer's son, a recovery coach at a rehab clinic
- John Earl Jelks as Dr. Dennis Washington, Chief of Hematology/Oncology at Gaffney
- Henderson Wade as Dr. Loren Johnson, a medical helicopter pilot and Trauma Surgery Fellow
- Beth Lacke as Dr. Margo Collins, a Board-certified in Internal Medicine specialising in Addiction Medicine Physician and Rehabilitation Clinical Director.
- Alet Taylor as Liliana Wapniarski, a Polish immigrant who is a housekeeper at Gaffney
- Kristof Konrad as Pawel Wapniarski, Liliana's brother
- Daniel Dorr as Robert "Sully" Sullivan, Ripley's friend from his delinquent youth, now a cancer patient
- Hope Lauren as Lynne Murphy, Sully's pregnant girlfriend
- Nicolette Robinson as Tara Goodwin, Sharon and Bert's daughter
- Hampton Fluker as Michael Goodwin, Sharon and Bert's son, a pharmaceutical rep
- Natalie Zea as Jackie Nelson, Burn Care Nurse
- Conor Perkins as Dr. Zach Hudgins, First-year resident in Emergency Medicine
- Devin Kawaoka as Dr. Kai Tanaka-Reed, First-year resident in General Surgery
- Ashlei Sharpe Chestnut as Naomi Howard, third-year medical student
- Lorena Diaz as ED Nurse Doris
- Marie Tredway as ED Nurse Trini
- Lynnette Li as ED Nurse Nancy
- Marc Grapey as Peter Kalmick, Gaffney's Head of Legal
- Jeremy Shouldis as Dr. Marty Peterson, an anesthesiologist at Gaffney

=== Crossover characters ===
- Joe Minoso as Firefighter Joe Cruz
- Hanako Greensmith as Paramedic Violet Mikami

== Episodes ==
No. overall	No. in season	Title	Directed by	Written by	Original release date	Prod. code	U.S. viewers (millions)
164	1	"Row, Row, Row Your Boat On a Rocky Sea"	Anna Dokoza	Diane Frolov & Andrew Schneider	January 17, 2024	901	6.93
Dr. Charles has his suspicions when the E.D. welcomes its newest member, Dr. Ripley. The hospital is put on high alert when a multi-car pile up results in a flood of patients. Meanwhile, Dr. Archer begins to have doubts about his kidney transplant. *This episode marks the first appearance of Luke Mitchell as Dr. Mitch Ripley.
165	2	"This Town Ain't Big Enough for Both of Us"	Tess Malone	Teleplay by : Stephen Hootstein; Story by : Stephen Hootstein & Danny Weiss	January 24, 2024	902	6.61
On the day of his kidney transplant, Dr. Archer deals with his ex-wife, who is trying to put a stop to the procedure. Dr. Marcel has his hands full with the new first-year resident Dr. Ahmad, who is already beginning to break hospital protocol. Meanwhile, Dr. Charles goes the extra mile to mend his friendship with Dr. Ripley.
166	3	"What Happens in the Dark Always Comes to Light"	Anthony Nardolillo	Meridith Friedman	January 31, 2024	903	6.62
Dr. Ahmed asks for Dr. Marcel's advice when she begins to fight with a patient's insurance company, as it refuses to pay for surgery that the patient needs and will die without. Meanwhile, Dr. Charles tends to a patient who lies about an injury in order for her husband to be admitted for a possible suicide attempt. Sharon begins to have doubts about making her new relationship public. Also, Dr. Asher deals with the consequences of a one night stand.
167	4	"These Are Not the Droids You Are Looking For"	Sharon Lewis	Eli Talbert	February 7, 2024	904	6.45
After recovering from his kidney transplant, Dr. Archer deals with the result of Dr. Ahmed's impulsive actions and with a patient who has a hereditary heart condition. Meanwhile, Sharon learns that her grandson has been rushed to the ED after a fall. Dr. Ahmed and Maggie treat a patient who is on a cross country adventure. Also, Dr. Asher helps a person whom she met in the ED with a medical condition.
168	5	"I Make a Promise, I Will Never Leave You"	Anna Dokoza	Diane Frolov & Andrew Schneider	February 21, 2024	905	6.30
Dr. Archer deals with a patient who is one of his son Sean's peers from the rehab center where Sean works. Meanwhile, Sharon asks for Dr. Charles' advice to get her ex-husband Bert tested to see what is wrong with him. Also, Dr. Asher tends to a patient who has been improperly treated for a miscarriage following restrictive changes in the reproductive care laws in her state.
169	6	"I Told Myself That I Was Done with You"	Michael Pressman	Gabriel L. Feinberg & Ryan Michael Johnson	February 28, 2024	906	6.37
Dr. Marcel and Dr. Ahmed have a disagreement when treating a patient with a blood clot. Dr. Archer and Maggie deal with a child patient's mother while treating an ulcer. Dr. Ripley tends to a patient from his past. Meanwhile, Sharon learns Bert's test results.
170	7	"Step on a Crack and Break Your Mother's Back"	Gonzalo Amat	Danny Weiss & Lily Dahl	March 20, 2024	907	6.32
Dr. Charles and Dr. Ripley tend to a patient who has a severe case of OCD. Dr. Marcel and Dr. Washington have a disagreement over whether to treat a patient with radiation or surgery when the patient's cancer returns. Meanwhile, Dr. Archer and Dr. Asher deal with a patient who has a foreign object in her heart.
171	8	"A Penny for Your Thoughts, Dollar for Your Dreams"	Joanna Kerns	Teleplay by : Stephen Hootstein; Story by : Stephen Hootstein & Eli Jarmel	March 27, 2024	908	6.03
Dr. Archer, Dr. Asher, and Dr. Charles deal with a pregnant patient's husband who claims to have the ability to telepathically communicate with the unborn child. Dr. Ahmad and Dr. Marcel tend to a patient who has been on a lung transplant waitlist for three years. Soon after, a criminal comes into the ED who might be a match for the patient. Dr. Charles asks Dr. Ripley to help his girlfriend's brother who presents with a dislocated shoulder.
172	9	"Spin a Yarn, Get Stuck in Your Own String"	Anna Dokoza	Teleplay by : Meridith Friedman; Story by : Meridith Friedman & Ashley Bower	April 3, 2024	909	6.36
Dr. Ripley and Dr. Charles deal with a patient who is a member of a cult that refuses treatment from a car accident while the former faces an impending lawsuit for malpractice. Dr. Asher and Dr. Archer are put in an uncomfortable position when an infant patient, Dr. Abrams' child, suffers from a serious fracture. Meanwhile, Dr. Marcel begins to lash out at his fellow residents following Dr. Ahmed's suspension. Also, Sharon contemplates letting her family meet Dr. Washington.
173	10	"You Might Just Find You Get What You Need"	Bethany Rooney	Eli Talbert	May 1, 2024	910	5.61
After transferring a heart to another hospital, Maggie and Dr. Johnson's helicopter is forced to make an emergency landing in the middle of nowhere, causing him to suffer an internal injury. Meanwhile, Dr. Charles looks into a patient's wife, who is suspected of a suicide attempt via jumping out of a window. Dr. Archer tends to a patient who is under the influence of PCP. Also, Dr. Asher treats a patient with a respiratory issue.
174	11	"I Think There Is Something You're Not Telling Me"	Brian Tee	Gabriel L. Feinberg & Ryan Michael Johnson	May 8, 2024	911	5.65
Dr. Ripley has his plate full, between dealing with a lawsuit deposition against Dr. Charles' girlfriend's brother and trying to keep his old friend's cancer diagnosis from his girlfriend, who has been rushed into the ED with pregnancy complications. Meanwhile, Dr. Charles and a new med student tend to a patient who has undiagnosed bipolar disorder. Also, Dr. Loren works with Dr. Archer to try to earn the trauma surgeon fellowship.
175	12	"Get by with a Little Help from My Friends"	Jonathan Brown	Danny Weiss & Lily Dahl	May 15, 2024	912	5.49
Dr. Marcel must make a decision when a scheduled liver transplant is postponed because the child recipient has an undiagnosed toe infection. Dr. Asher is forced to deliver a baby at 29 weeks. Meanwhile, Dr. Charles and Maggie are worried for a burn unit nurse when the latter discovers cut marks on her arms. Sharon tries to decide what to do for her ex-husband Bert's wellbeing and scolds Dr. Archer for coming down too hard on the new student doctors.
176	13	"I Think I Know You, but Do I Really?"	Anna Dokoza	Diane Frolov & Andrew Schneider	May 22, 2024	913	5.49
Dr. Charles and Dr. Ripley treat a prisoner patient who has undiagnosed dementia. Dr. Asher tends to a pregnant woman with a leg injury. Dr. Archer clashes with Sean when one of the latter's sponsors falls off the wagon. Meanwhile, Sharon considers a difficult decision for Bert. Also, Dr. Marcel deals with the fallout of his child patient not receiving the liver transplant.: This episode marks the final appearance of Dr. Crockett Marcel (Dominic Rains).

== Production ==
=== Casting ===
On November 29, 2023, it was announced that Luke Mitchell would join the series in a recurring role with the potential to be expanded to a series regular. On June 28, 2024, it was announced that Dominic Rains, who as portrayed Dr. Crockett Marcel since the fifth season, would be exiting the series following the season nine finale.

=== Filming ===
It was announced on March 8, 2024, that former cast member Brian Tee would return to direct the eleventh episode of the season.

== Ratings ==
Viewership and ratings per episode of Chicago Med season 9
No.	Title	Air date	Rating (18–49)	Viewers (millions)	DVR (18–49)	DVR viewers (millions)	Total (18–49)	Total viewers (millions)
1	"Row Row Row Your Boat on a Rocky Sea"	January 17, 2024	0.6	6.93	—N/a	—N/a	—N/a	—N/a
2	"This Town Ain't Big Enough for Both of Us"	January 24, 2024	0.6	6.61	—N/a	—N/a	—N/a	—N/a
3	"What Happens in the Dark Always Comes to Light"	January 31, 2024	0.5	6.62	—N/a	—N/a	—N/a	—N/a
4	"These Are Not the Droids You Are Looking For"	February 7, 2024	0.5	6.45	—N/a	—N/a	—N/a	—N/a
5	"I Make a Promise, I Will Never Leave You"	February 21, 2024	0.5	6.88	—N/a	—N/a	—N/a	—N/a
6	"I Told Myself That I Was Done With You"	February 28, 2024	0.5	6.37	—N/a	—N/a	—N/a	—N/a
7	"Step on a Crack and Break Your Mother's Back"	March 20, 2024	0.5	6.32	0.2	1.99	0.7	8.31
8	"A Penny for Your Thoughts, Dollar for Your Dreams"	March 27, 2024	0.4	6.03	0.2	1.97	0.6	8.00
9	"Spin A Yarn, Get Stuck In Your Own String"	April 3, 2024	0.5	6.36	0.2	1.98	0.7	8.34
10	"You Might Just Find You Get What You Need"	May 1, 2024	0.4	5.61	0.2	1.82	0.6	7.43
11	"I Think There is Something Your Not Telling Me"	May 8, 2024	0.4	5.65	0.2	1.91	0.6	7.41
12	"Get By With a Little Help From My Friends"	May 15, 2024	0.4	5.49	0.2	1.77	0.6	7.26
13	"I Think I Know You, but Do I Really?"	May 22, 2024	0.4	5.49	—N/a	—N/a	—N/a	—N/a
