= Chicago Med season 7 =

Chicago Med
- Season 7
- Chicago Med Season 7 DVD cover
- Showrunners: Andrew Schneider; Diane Frolov
- No. of episodes: 22

Release
- Original network: NBC
- Original release: September 22, 2021 – May 25, 2022

Season chronology
- ← Previous; Season 6 Next → Season 8

The seventh season of Chicago Med, an American medical drama television series with executive producer Dick Wolf, and producers Michael Brandt, Derek Haas, Peter Jankowski, Andrew Schneider and Diane Frolov, was ordered on February 27, 2020. The season premiered on September 22, 2021 and ended on May 25, 2022. Ongoing storylines included a covert investigation of illegal kickbacks from a medical equipment manufacturer and the series exit of Dr. Manning (portrayed by Torrey DeVitto).

== Cast ==
=== Main characters ===
- Nick Gehlfuss as Dr. Will Halstead, Supervising Attending Emergency Physician
- Torrey DeVitto as Dr. Natalie Manning (episode 1)
- Brian Tee as LCDR Dr. Ethan Choi, Attending Emergency Physician/Chief of the ED (8 episodes)
- Marlyne Barrett as Maggie Campbell, RN, ED Charge Nurse
- S. Epatha Merkerson as Sharon Goodwin, Chief of Patient and Medical Services
- Oliver Platt as Dr. Daniel Charles, Chief of Psychiatry
- Dominic Rains as Dr. Crockett Marcel, Trauma Surgeon
- Guy Lockard as Dr. Dylan Scott, Emergency Medicine/Pediatrics Resident
- Kristen Hager as Dr. Stevie Hammer, Emergency Attending Physician (episodes 1–14)
- Steven Weber (Note: Weber was credited as "Special Guest Star" in all appearances.) as Dr. Dean Archer, Interim Chief of The ED
- Jessy Schram as Dr. Hannah Asher (episodes 16–22)

=== Recurring characters ===
- Michael Rady as Dr. Matt Cooper, a Critical Care Specialist suspected of taking illegal kickbacks
- Sarah Rafferty as Dr. Pamela Blake, Chief of Transplant Surgery
- Asjha Cooper as Dr. Vanessa Taylor, Emergency Medicine Resident
- Brennan Brown as Dr. Sam Abrams, Attending Neurosurgeon
- Lorena Diaz as ED Nurse Doris
- Marie Tredway as ED Nurse Trinidad “Trini” Campos
- Lynnette Li as ED Nurse Nancy
- Marc Grapey as Peter Kalmick, head of Gaffney's legal team
- Bonita Friedericy as Terri Hammer, the homeless mother of Dr. Hammer
- Curtiss Cook as Reginald Scott, Dr. Scott's father, a lieutenant in the Chicago PD
- Deanne Lauvin as Zora Scott, Dr. Scott's sister, an officer in the Chicago PD
- Angela Wong Carbone as Jessa Rinaldi, a product rep for Vasik Labs
- Johnny M. Wu as Dr. Randall Shentu, a rep consultant hired by Gaffney
- Kellee Stewart as Carmen Walker, former flame of Dr. Scott, now married to his ex-friend
- Jerod Haynes as Terrell Walker
- Anthony B. Jenkins as Darius, the Walkers' young son, a cancer patient
- Johanna Braddy as Avery Quinn, Dr. Blake's daughter, a malpractice attorney
- Nora Dunn as Dr. Lonnie Richardson, Dr. Charles' former therapist
- Nicolette Robinson as Tara Goodwin, Sharon's pregnant daughter
- Hannah Alligood as Anna Charles, daughter of Dr. Charles
- Riley Voelkel as Milena "Jo" Jovanovic, an undercover police officer treated by Dr. Scott
- Jeremy Shouldis as Dr. Marty Peterson, an anesthesiologist at Gaffney

=== Crossover characters ===
- LaRoyce Hawkins as Officer Kevin Atwater
- Marina Squerciati as Officer Kim Burgess
- Randy Flagler as Firefighter Harold Capp
- Anthony Ferraris as Firefighter Tony Ferraris

== Episodes ==
No. overall	No. in season	Title	Directed by	Written by	Original release date	Prod. code	U.S. viewers (millions)
120	1	"You Can't Always Trust What You See"	Nicole Rubio	Diane Frolov & Andrew Schneider	September 22, 2021	701	6.81
Dr. Manning departs Chicago and Dr. Halstead returns to Gaffney at the request of Sharon to investigate a fellow doctor (Dr. Cooper) suspected of taking kickbacks. Meanwhile, Gaffney welcomes Dr. Dylan Scott and Dr. Stephanie "Stevie" Hammer, the latter having known Dr. Halstead since medical school. Dr. Archer and Dr. Charles deal with a set of twins who do everything together inside and out. Dr. Scott treats a child patient with sickle cell anemia. Note: Final Main Appearance of Dr. Natalie Manning. First Appearances of Dr. Dylan Scott and Dr. Stevie Hammer
121	2	"To Lean In or To Let Go"	Oz Scott	Safura Fadavi	September 29, 2021	702	6.71
Drs. Hammer and Halstead have a disagreement while dealing with a patient with Addison's disease whose mother is determined to do anything to protect him from unnecessary treatment. Drs. Taylor and Archer are at odds about treating a motorcycle accident victim. Drs. Scott and Charles deal with a UNICEF negotiator with repressed trauma. Meanwhile, Dr. Halstead continues his investigation into Dr. Cooper receiving kickbacks. Sharon's health is in jeopardy when she begins to experience dizzy spells.
122	3	"Be the Change You Want to See"	Mykelti Williamson	Meridith Friedman	October 6, 2021	703	7.02
Dr. Hammer is put into an uncomfortable situation when the husband of a patient, and one of the hospital's biggest financial donors, acts inappropriately towards her. Drs. Halstead and Scott treat a patient who is lying about having lupus. Drs. Taylor, Charles, and Marcel try to convince a patient to agree to lifesaving surgery.
123	4	"Status Quo (The Mess We're In)"	Milena Govich	Eli Talbert	October 13, 2021	704	6.94
Maggie, Dr. Hammer, and Dr. Taylor are skeptical about a patient who claims to have terminal cancer. Dr. Hammer runs tests and discovers that the patient is cancer-free. Drs. Charles and Scott deal with a previous patient with schizophrenia. Dr. Halstead continues his kickbacks investigation into Dr. Cooper by presenting a new idea for the hospital.
124	5	"Change Is a Tough Pill to Swallow"	Nicole Rubio	Jeff Drayer & Natalie Drayer	October 20, 2021	705	6.77
Drs. Halstead and Hammer put their differences aside to treat an elderly patient. Drs. Charles and Scott deal with a patient who was misdiagnosed with ADHD. Dr. Marcel is forced to jump through political hoops while treating a patient who is the family member of another physician.
125	6	"When You're a Hammer Everything's a Nail"	Charles S. Carroll	Daniel Sinclair	October 27, 2021	706	6.80
When her mother is admitted to the hospital, Dr. Hammer enlists help from Dr. Taylor so her mother will agree to seek treatment. Dr. Scott's police past comes back when he recognizes his patient's father, who he arrested 10 years prior for domestic violence, and suspects his daughter's injuries are not accidental. Dr. Marcel is forced to pick sides when it comes to a patient who needs a liver transplant. Also, Sharon continues to press Dr. Halstead over his investigation into Dr. Cooper.
126	7	"A Square Peg in a Round Hole"	Timothy Busfield	Stephen Hootstein & Gabriel L. Feinberg	November 3, 2021	707	6.67
Dr. Ethan Choi returns to Gaffney after his near fatal shooting accident and tries to adjust. Dr. Marcel tends to a patient in need of a liver transplant. Dr. Halstead continues the corruption investigation into Dr. Cooper.
127	8	"Just as a Snake Sheds Its Skin"	Michael Berry	Safura Fadavi & Meridith Friedman	November 10, 2021	708	6.46
Dr. Scott's life as a doctor and his past life as a police officer are put to the test when a family friend and a veteran is investigated by the police. Maggie lends a hand to Dr. Taylor when the hospital announces new random drug testing. Dr. Choi puts his recovery at risk when tending to a patient. Dr. Halstead helps Dr. Hammer search for her mother after she goes missing.
128	9	"Secret Santa Has a Gift for You"	Nicole Rubio	Diane Frolov & Andrew Schneider	December 8, 2021	709	6.59
Dr. Halstead's investigation into Dr. Cooper reaches a stalemate when the hospital won't go to the FBI. At the same time, he helps Dr. Scott with a 4-month-old patient. Meanwhile, Dr. Taylor struggles to keep her addiction a secret. Drs. Marcel and Blake join Dr. Abrams for a liver transplant.
129	10	"No Good Deed Goes Unpunished... in Chicago"	Michael Pressman	Eli Talbert & Ryan Michael Johnson	January 5, 2022	710	6.94
Sharon deals with the fallout of the Vascom scandal, leading to new hospital personnel. Meanwhile, Drs. Marcel and Blake tend to a patient with severe autism. Also, a patient’s child lies to the hospital about his father's injuries.
130	11	"The Things We Thought We Left Behind"	S. J. Main Muñoz	Jeff Drayer & Natalie Drayer	January 12, 2022	711	7.33
Drs. Marcel and Blake are at odds when trying to figure out which of their respective patients will receive a new liver. Dr. Scott's past comes to light when he reunites with a patient with whom he was previously romantically involved. Drs. Hammer and Charles team up to help a patient who fell in an alley.
131	12	"What You Don't Know Can't Hurt You"	Tess Malone	Stephen Hootstein & Daniel Sinclair	January 19, 2022	712	7.45
Drs. Hammer and Halstead deal with a pregnant patient in need of an emergency C-section who only wants a blood transfusion with COVID-19 vaccine-free blood. Meanwhile, when Dr. Blake and her entire team mysteriously collapse in the middle of an operation, Dr. Marcel is forced to take over, leading Sharon to join as the OR Nurse. Dr. Charles visits Dr. Choi and encourages him to reconcile with his dad.
132	13	"Reality Leaves a Lot to the Imagination"	X. Dean Lim	Teleplay by : Meridith Friedman; Story by : Meridith Friedman & Lily Dahl	February 23, 2022	713	7.13
Drs. Scott and Archer diagnose a pregnant woman with a serious infection. Maggie receives shocking news. Drs. Halstead and Charles question an elderly patient’s Alzheimer’s diagnosis. In an effort to help a patient, Dr. Marcel takes a risk.
133	14	"All the Things That Could Have Been"	Jonathan Brown	Diane Frolov & Andrew Schneider & Conor Patrick Hogan	March 2, 2022	714	7.05
Goodwin assigns Med’s new compliance officer to a patient with a long-hauler COVID condition. Maggie helps Dr. Halstead treat a patient who's been in an iron lung for 60 years. Dr. Hammer learns hard truths about her mother. Terrell returns to Med under dire circumstances.
134	15	"Things Meant to Be Bent Not Broken"	Afia Nathaniel	Stephen Hootstein & Gabriel L. Feinberg	March 9, 2022	715	7.05
Dr. Scott suspects his patient may be a drug dealer. Dr. Halstead must decide how to spend his whistleblower settlement. Drs. Charles and Taylor help a patient who believes she's infested with parasites. Drs. Marcel and Blake are paired with an arrogant surgeon.
135	16	"May Your Choices Reflect Hope, Not Fear"	Tess Malone	Teleplay by : Eli Talbert & Ryan Michael Johnson; Story by : Eli Talbert & Mrittika "Mou" Sarin	March 16, 2022	716	6.35
Relationships and friendships are tested at Med. Dr. Taylor treats a patient whose daughter is arranged to be married.
136	17	"If You Love Someone, Set Them Free"	Bethany Rooney	Jeff Drayer & Natalie Drayer	April 6, 2022	717	6.61
Drs. Halstead and Charles work with a teenage brain cancer patient who's refusing treatment. A patient's transplanted uterus fails, causing the doctors to consider transplanting one from her sister.
137	18	"Judge Not, For You Will Be Judged"	Nicole Rubio	Safura Fadavi & Meridith Friedman	April 13, 2022	718	6.86
Drs. Archer and Asher clash over a patient with close ties to Goodwin. Maggie and Dr. Halstead treat an illegal immigrant.
138	19	"Like a Phoenix Rising from the Ashes"	Timothy Busfield	Stephen Hootstein & Daniel Sinclair	April 20, 2022	719	6.66
Drs. Halstead and Asher work to save a surrogate's baby. Dr. Charles cares for a patient on a hunger strike. Dr. Scott and Maggie are confused over a supposedly sober patient who presents as drunk.
139	20	"End of the Day, Anything Can Happen"	Daniel Willis	Eli Talbert & Gabriel L. Feinberg	May 11, 2022	720	6.37
Dr. Scott helps the daughter of a mob boss. A grandmother comes to Med desperate to save her grandson. Dr. Choi struggles with shocking news about his father. Drs. Halstead and Taylor care for Maggie's high school classmate.
140	21	"Lying Doesn't Protect You from the Truth"	Michael Pressman	Jeff Drayer & Natalie Drayer	May 18, 2022	721	6.24
Drs. Scott and Choi treat a patient shot during a drug raid. Drs. Charles and Taylor work together to properly diagnose a motivational speaker. Drs. Halstead and Asher turn to Dr. Marcel for help with a pregnant patient.
141	22	"And Now We Come to the End"	Nicole Rubio	Teleplay by : Diane Frolov & Andrew Schneider & Meridith Friedman; Story by : Meridith Friedman & Lily Dahl	May 25, 2022	722	6.43
A fire rocks two doctors and everyone experiences friendship and relationship drama. Dr. Marcel has a tough decision to make regarding Dr. Blake's surgery.

== Production ==
=== Filming ===
Filming for season 7 started on July 20, 2021

=== Casting ===
On May 12, 2021, Yaya DaCosta and Torrey Devitto announced their departure from the series, however DeVitto appeared in the season 7 premiere to wrap up her character's storyline. On July 21, 2021, it was announced that Steven Weber would be promoted to a series regular after recurring in the sixth season, and Guy Lockard and Kristen Hager would join the main cast. On March 16, 2022, it was announced that Jessy Schram, who previously recurred as Dr. Hannah Asher had been promoted to series regular as of episode 16 of the seventh season. On April 4, 2022, it was announced that Kristen Hager exited the series.

== Ratings ==
Viewership and ratings per episode of Chicago Med season 7
No.	Title	Air date	Rating (18–49)	Viewers (millions)	DVR (18–49)	DVR viewers (millions)	Total (18–49)	Total viewers (millions)
1	"You Can't Always Trust What You See"	September 22, 2021	0.8	6.81	—N/a	—N/a	—N/a	—N/a
2	"To Lean In, Or To Let Go"	September 29, 2021	0.7	6.71	—N/a	—N/a	—N/a	—N/a
3	"Be the Change You Want to See"	October 6, 2021	0.8	7.02	—N/a	—N/a	—N/a	—N/a
4	"Status Quo, aka the Mess We're In"	October 13, 2021	0.8	6.94	0.4	2.30	1.2	9.25
5	"Change Is a Tough Pill to Swallow"	October 20, 2021	0.7	6.77	0.4	2.25	1.1	9.01
6	"When You're a Hammer Everything's a Nail"	October 27, 2021	0.7	6.80	—N/a	—N/a	—N/a	—N/a
7	"A Square Peg in a Round Hole"	November 3, 2021	0.7	6.67	—N/a	—N/a	—N/a	—N/a
8	"Just as a Snake Sheds Its Skin"	November 10, 2021	0.7	6.46	—N/a	—N/a	—N/a	—N/a
9	"Secret Santa Has a Gift for You"	December 8, 2021	0.7	6.59	0.5	2.40	1.2	8.98
10	"No Good Deed Goes Unpunished... in Chicago"	January 5, 2022	0.8	6.94	—N/a	—N/a	—N/a	—N/a
11	"The Things We Thought We Left Behind"	January 12, 2022	0.8	7.33	—N/a	—N/a	—N/a	—N/a
12	"What You Don't Know Can't Hurt You"	January 19, 2022	0.8	7.45	—N/a	—N/a	—N/a	—N/a
13	"Reality Leaves a Lot To The Imagination"	February 23, 2022	0.8	7.13	—N/a	—N/a	—N/a	—N/a
14	"All the Things That Could Have Been"	March 2, 2022	0.7	7.05	—N/a	—N/a	—N/a	—N/a
15	"Things Meant to Be Bent Not Broken"	March 9, 2022	0.9	7.05	—N/a	—N/a	—N/a	—N/a
16	"May Your Choices Reflect Hope, Not Fear"	March 16, 2022	0.7	6.35	—N/a	—N/a	—N/a	—N/a
17	"If You Love Someone, Set Them Free"	April 6, 2022	0.7	6.61	—N/a	—N/a	—N/a	—N/a
18	"Judge Not, For You Will Be Judged"	April 13, 2022	0.7	6.86	—N/a	—N/a	—N/a	—N/a
19	"Like a Phoenix Rising from the Ashes"	April 20, 2022	0.7	6.66	—N/a	—N/a	—N/a	—N/a
20	"End of the Day, Anything Can Happen"	May 11, 2022	0.6	6.37	—N/a	—N/a	—N/a	—N/a
21	"Lying Doesn't Protect You from the Truth"	May 18, 2022	0.6	6.24	—N/a	—N/a	—N/a	—N/a
22	"And Now We Come to the End"	May 25, 2022	0.7	6.43	—N/a	—N/a	—N/a	—N/a
