= Chicago Med season 10 =

Chicago Med
- Season 10
- Showrunner: Allen MacDonald
- No. of episodes: 22

Release
- Original network: NBC
- Original release: September 25, 2024 – May 21, 2025

Season chronology
- ← Previous; Season 9 Next → Season 11

The tenth season of Chicago Med, an American drama television series an American medical drama television series with executive producer Dick Wolf, and producers Michael Brandt, Derek Haas, Peter Jankowski and Allen MacDonald, was ordered on March 21, 2024. Storylines centered around vast layoffs and restructuring at Gaffney and other Chicago hospitals. The season premiered on September 25, 2024. The season marks the final main appearance of Marlyne Barrett as Charge Nurse Maggie Lockwood

== Cast ==
=== Main characters ===
- Steven Weber as Dr. Dean Archer, Attending Physician and Board certified in Trauma Surgery
- Marlyne Barrett as Maggie Lockwood, RN, ED Charge Nurse
- Jessy Schram as Dr. Hannah Asher, Attending Physician and Board certified in OBGYN
- Luke Mitchell as Dr. Mitchell Ripley, Attending Physician in Emergency Medicine
- Sarah Ramos as Dr. Caitlin Lenox, Chief of Emergency Medicine
- Darren Barnet as Dr. Jonathan Frost, Emergency Pediatrics resident and former television actor
- S. Epatha Merkerson as Sharon Goodwin, Executive Director of Patient and Medical Services
- Oliver Platt as Dr. Daniel Charles, Chief of Psychiatry

=== Recurring characters ===
- Brennan Brown as Dr. Samuel Abrams, Chief of Neurosurgery
- Lorena Diaz as Doris Perez, Emergency Nurse
- Devin Kawaoka as Dr. Kai Tanaka-Reed, General Surgery resident
- Conor Perkins as Dr. Zach Hudgins, Resident in Emergency Medicine
- Henderson Wade as Dr. Loren Johnson, a medical helicopter pilot and trauma surgery fellow
- Lilah Richcreek Estrada as Dr. Nellie Cuevas, a Psychiatry Fellow Physician and DACA recipient
- John Earl Jelks as Dr. Dennis Washington, Chief of Hematology/Oncology
- Nicolette Robinson as Tara Goodwin, Sharon's daughter
- Daniel Dorr as Robert "Sully" Sullivan, cancer patient and Ripley's friend
- Hope Lauren as Lynne Murphy Sullivan, Sully wife and Ripley's friend
- Natalie Zea as Jackie Nelson, Emergency Nurse and former burn care nurse
- Ashlei Sharpe Chestnut as Dr. Naomi Howard, third-year student doctor in the ED
- Luigi Sottile as Sean Archer, Dean's son
- Logan Miller as Kip Lenox, Caitlin's brother
- Jessalyn Gilsig as Ainsley Towne, an actress, Frost's former co-star
- Erin Anderson as Lizzy Asher, Hannah's sister
- Tiff Abreu as Cassidy, a widow with issues against Goodwin
- Brendan Hines as Dr. Nicholas Hayes, Gaffney's renowned cardiologist
- Jeremy Shouldis as Dr. Marty Peterson, an anesthesiologist at Gaffney

=== Special guest characters ===
- Rachel DiPillo as Dr. Sarah Reese, Psychiatrist at the Ananke Center

=== Crossover characters ===
- Taylor Kinney as Lt. Kelly Severide
- David Eigenberg as Lt. Christopher Herrmann
- Christopher Stolte as Lt. "Mouch" McHolland
- Miranda Rae Mayo as Lt. Stella Kidd
- Daniel Kyri as Firefighter Darren Ritter
- Jake Lockett as Firefighter Sam Carver
- Dermot Mulroney as Chief Dom Pascal
- Patrick John Flueger as Officer Adam Ruzek
- LaRoyce Hawkins as Officer Kevin Atwater
- Toya Turner as Officer Tiana Cook
- Amy Morton as Sgt. Trudy Platt
- Jason Beghe as Sgt. Hank Voight

== Episodes ==
No. overall	No. in season	Title	Directed by	Written by	Original release date	Prod. code	U.S. viewers (millions)
177	1	"Sink Or Swim"	Anna Dokoza	Allen MacDonald	September 25, 2024	1001	5.46
Gaffney staff are put on high alert after a commuter ship capsizes. New doctors are introduced: Caitlin Lenox, ex-army attending physician and co-lead of the ED with Archer, and Jon Frost, pediatrics specialist at a closing hospital who brings in a young patient in need of an MRI. Asher and Archer deal with a pregnant victim with a pieces of metal lodged in her stomach. Goodwin announces that another hospital is closing and are forced to take in other patients. Ripley's fate as a doctor hangs in the balance following an altercation with one of his past patients.
178	2	"Bite Your Tongue"	Anthony Nardolillo	Stephen Hootstein	October 2, 2024	1002	5.52
Archer and Lenox work together after realizing their patients have similar symptoms. Asher asks for Charles' advice on a pregnant patient who may be experiencing a schizophrenic episode. Frost deals with parents who withhold their soccer champ son's terminal diagnosis from him. Ripley faces suspension from the fallout with Pawel. Goodwin is forced to make difficult cuts from Gaffney's staff.
179	3	"Trust Fall"	Tess Malone	Lauren MacKenzie & Andrew Gettens	October 9, 2024	1003	5.33
Archer asks for Charles' assistance with a heart patient who has grown accustomed to an AI companion. Maggie oversees a pregnant woman who has trust issues with doctors and clashes with Lenox. Frost gains the nickname "Hollywood" after the staff learns he was once a teen heartthrob on a TV sitcom. Goodwin receives a death threat. Ripley and Asher's relationship turns sour after Sully turns himself in.
180	4	"Blurred Lines"	Gonzalo Amat	Meridith Friedman	October 16, 2024	1004	5.44
Ripley and Charles work with a woman whose eyes were burned by acid. Frost suspects a father of deception about his daughter's condition to gain her meds. Nurse Jackie Nelson transfers to the ED from the burn unit. Asher is haunted by the loss of a preeclampsia patient who did not survive her child's birth.
181	5	"Bad Habits"	Anna Dokoza	Danny Weiss	October 23, 2024	1005	6.05
Halloween hijinks ensue once more when a vampiric rabies patient bites Frost's arm. Asher assists Ripley with a practicing nun who did not know she was once pregnant with a "stone child". Maggie deals with Asher's patient, a child with autism. Goodwin is convinced that an intruder had broken into her home.
182	6	"Forget Me Not"	Michael Pressman	Lauren Glover	November 6, 2024	1006	6.01
Frost and Charles help a patient experiencing amnesia. Archer and Lenox clash treating a child patient who is waiting for parental consent to perform surgery. Maggie helps a 16-year-old mother looking to give up her child for adoption. Goodwin discovers the individual accused of stalking her.
183	7	"Family Matters"	Bethany Rooney	Ryan Michael Johnson	November 13, 2024	1007	5.98
Archer and Lenox cannot coexist as ED co-leads forcing Goodwin to choose between them (she goes with Lenox). Ripley and Frost are put into a unique situation with a patient that has a DNR request.
184	8	"Love Will Tear Us Apart"	Lee Friedlander	Deanna Shumaker	November 20, 2024	1008	5.86
Charles argues with his former intern Sarah Reese about the best course for her disturbed patient. Lenox and Ripley tend to a patient with a near severed spinal cord. Archer considers leaving Chicago after he is forced to step down as chief of the ED. After being denied release, Ripley seeks alternatives for his terminal friend, Sully, to see his infant son one last time. Goodwin is stabbed by her stalker, Cassidy, whose partner was a victim the overcrowded ED did not save.
185	9	"No Love Lost"	Cherie Nowlan	Ashley Bower & Eli Jarmel	January 8, 2025	1009	6.17
Archer finds Goodwin who is rushed into emergency surgery. Charles is charged with a misconduct charge by Sarah Reese after involuntarily committing her patient. Frost and Abrams have conflict over a child patient who needs brain surgery.
186	10	"Broken Hearts"	Edward Ornelas	Andrew Gettens & Lauren MacKenzie	January 22, 2025	1010	6.03
A team of doctors work around the clock to separate conjoined twins. Ripley asks Lenox to help his terminal incarcerated friend Sully spend more time with his newborn. Asher's estranged sister, Lizzy, reunites with her to ask a favor. Archer deals with an overbearing patient who has minor back pain. Maggie contemplates breaking up with Loren.
187	11	"In the Trenches: Part II"	Anna Dokoza	Stephen Hootstein	January 29, 2025	1011	6.55
The cave-ins in mid-Chicago carry over to Gaffney when Sgt. Trudy Platt is severely wounded after pursuing an offender responsible for a major gas explosion. Lt. Kelly Severide, Archer, and Chief Pascal figure out a plan to rescue Lt. Stella Kidd and Officer Adam Ruzek trapped in a subway car. Note : This episode continues a crossover event that begins on Chicago Fire season 13 episode 11 and concludes on Chicago P.D. season 12 episode 11.
188	12	"In The Wake"	Sharon Lewis	Meridith Friedman	February 5, 2025	1012	6.27
Asher deals with a pregnant patient who claims she was attacked but actually jumped off a bridge in a suicide attempt. The hospital understaffed and nurses are forced to attend to other duties leading nurse Doris to make a mistake with a patient. Hannah grows concerned as Ripley struggles to cope with the loss of Sully. Goodwin is diagnosed with PTSI following her attack.
189	13	"Take a Look in the Mirror"	Andi Behring	Danny Weiss	February 19, 2025	1013	6.28
Ripley's self-destructive behavior comes to a head when the person he attacked is rushed to Gaffney for an emergency surgery. Lenox's mentorship is questioned when her student doctor begins to judge her professional opinion on a tricky surgery. Charles testifies for a colleague. Asher tends to a patient who has a ectopic pregnancy from being raped.
190	14	"Acid Test"	Brian Tee	Lauren Glover	February 26, 2025	1014	5.96
Goodwin and the staff are put on high alert when a NABH agent shows up for a surprise inspection. Ripley lends a helping hand to Sully's fiancée and her child after being suspended. Frost and Lenox tend to a patient who was accidentally shot by their sibling. Asher treats a girl with toxic shock syndrome. Archer gets high on acid after treating a partygoer.
191	15	"Down in a Hole"	Anna Dokoza	Allen MacDonald	March 5, 2025	1015	5.80
The CFD (led by Lt. "Mouch" McHolland) race to rescue Ripley who is trapped in a makeshift tunnel after he saved a mother and daughter who fell down a well. Frost runs into actress Ainsley Towne, who co-starred as his mom on "Nick of Time" when he was a juvenile, and tries to reconcile their awkward history. Asher learns that her sister, Lizzy, is pregnant via IVF.
192	16	"Poster Child"	Anthony Nardolillo	Conor Patrick Hogan & Dylan Johnson	March 26, 2025	1016	5.92′
A patient from Goodwin's past who has been in a coma for 22 years is rushed into Gaffney for a possible stroke. Charles and Frost deal with a teenager who is struggling to confess his sexuality to his parents. Ripley recovers from his injuries and regains his position in the ED.
193	17	"The Book of Archer"	Olenka Denysenko	Deanna Shumaker	April 2, 2025	1017	5.70
Archer deals with the loss of his ex-wife while asked to step in as ED chief while Lenox takes a personal day to sit with a dying patient. Archer and Charles tend to a child who had a heart transplant and complains that the new organ is rejecting him. Asher tends to a pregnant patient who discovers a mass on her ovary. Maggie’s continues to deal with the shortages of nurses.
194	18	"Together One Last Time"	Joanna Kerns	Ryan Michael Johnson	April 16, 2025	1018	5.61
Asher admits Lizzy for compilations during her pregnancy and discovers the baby has no heartbeat. Charles and Lenox assess a patient who has an undiagnosed heart condition and an over-sexed ex-wife with memory issues. Frost advocates for a child snake bite victim whose parents are obsessed with their social media profile. Asher and Ripley end their relationship.
195	19	"The Stories We Tell Ourselves"	Tess Malone	Meridith Friedman	April 23, 2025	1019	5.38
Maggie and Goodwin clash over negotiations for the new nurses contract. Frost and Charles deal with a child patient abandoned by his mother. Goodwin discovers Washington has kept their relationship a secret from his 35-year-old daughter. Paramedic Matt donates a portion of his kidney to a teenager struck by his ambulance. Frost confronts his former costar, Ainsley, about seducing him when he was a minor. Asher considers being a surrogate for Lizzy.
196	20	"The Invisible Hand"	Anna Dokoza	Stephen Hootstein	May 7, 2025	1020	5.37
Goodwin mediates for the pending strike after Maggie and the nurses stage an effective sick-out. Lenox is romanced by suave cardiologist Hayes and then learns he sexually harassed intern Naomi Howard. Archer and Frost bet on who will be first to check out their inflated patient loads. Ripley treats an aging lothario engaged to Charles' defensive mother, Margaret.
197	21	"Baby Mine..."	Gonzalo Amat	Lauren MacKenzie & Andrew Gettens	May 14, 2025	1021	5.17
Organ donor lungs intended for Frost's cystic fibrosis patient are hijacked by a wealthy man for his dying daughter. Goodwin backs reluctant Howard in her claims against Hayes. Charles gives an honest eulogy at his mother's funeral. Lenox makes a deal with her wayward brother, Kip, that both will be tested for a genetic disorder. Asher learns she cannot be a surrogate because she is already pregnant.
198	22	"...Don't You Cry"	Anna Dokoza	Allen MacDonald	May 21, 2025	1022	5.81
Charles seeks advice from Sarah Reese on how to separate professional from personal after his daughter, Anna, attempts suicide. Goodwin is directed by the board to fire Washington, which ends their relationship. The designated recipient of transplant lungs donates them to Frost and Maggie's passed-over patient. Lenox tests positive for GSS, a prion disease. Ripley reunites with Sadie, the woman he rescued, while Asher reaches out to the father of her unborn child: Archer.

== Production ==
=== Casting ===
On June 28, 2024, it was confirmed that Dominic Rains would be leaving the cast after five seasons at the end of Season 9. His character was written out at the end of that season, with a leaving party being mentioned in the Season 10 premiere.

It was announced on August 5, 2024, that Sarah Ramos and Darren Barnet were added as series regulars for Season 10. Both characters made their debuts in the season premiere.

As with the previous season, all of the main cast missed at least one episode due to budget reasons, which was a condition of the show being renewed

=== Production Staff ===
Previous showrunners Andrew Schneider and Diane Frolov had stepped down from the role at the end of Season 9, and their replacement was announced as Allen MacDonald on May 22, 2024.

This was also the first season to break with the tradition of each episode title having the same number of words as the season number. The season premiere, "Sink or Swim", did have 10 letters, but this was simply a co-incidence.

=== Crossover ===
In January 2025 the Chicago shows aired their first full crossover since 2019. The episodes, called "In the Trenches", were filmed in late 2024 and saw the casts of the three shows dealing with a gas explosion at a government building that also caused a subway car to be trapped underground. The episodes were described as a "three-hour action movie" by Anastasia Puglisi, Wolf Entertainment Executive Vice President and co-executive producer of the One Chicago series

== Ratings ==
Viewership and ratings per episode of Chicago Med season 10
No.	Title	Air date	Rating (18–49)	Viewers (millions)	DVR (18–49)	DVR viewers (millions)	Total (18–49)	Total viewers (millions)	Ref.
1	"Sink Or Swim"	September 25, 2024	0.3	5.46	—N/a	—N/a	—N/a	—N/a	
2	"Bite Your Tongue"	October 2, 2024	0.4	5.52	—N/a	—N/a	—N/a	—N/a	
3	"Trust Fall"	October 9, 2024	0.4	5.33	—N/a	—N/a	—N/a	—N/a	
4	"Blurred Lines"	October 16, 2024	0.4	5.44	0.2	1.77	0.5	7.21	
5	"Bad Habits"	October 23, 2024	0.4	6.05	0.1	1.56	0.6	7.62	
6	"Forget Me Not"	November 6, 2024	0.4	6.01	0.1	1.67	0.6	7.68	
7	"Family Matters"	November 13, 2024	0.4	5.98	0.1	1.65	0.5	7.63	
8	"Love Will Tear Us Apart"	November 20, 2024	0.4	5.86	0.1	1.59	0.5	7.45	
9	"No Love Lost"	January 8, 2025	0.5	6.17	0.1	1.42	0.5	7.58	
10	"Broken Hearts"	January 15, 2025	0.4	6.03	0.1	1.67	0.5	7.70	
11	"In the Trenches: Part II"	January 29, 2025	0.5	6.55	0.1	1.96	0.6	8.30	
12	"In The Wake"	February 5, 2025	0.5	6.27	0.1	1.75	0.6	8.03	
13	"Take a Look in the Mirror"	February 19, 2025	0.5	6.28	0.1	1.63	0.6	7.91	
14	"Acid Test"	February 26, 2025	0.4	5.96	0.1	1.73	0.5	7.69	
15	"Down in a Hole"	March 5, 2025	0.4	5.80	0.1	1.52	0.5	7.32	
16	"Poster Child"	March 26, 2025	0.4	5.92	0.2	1.72	0.6	7.63	
17	"The Book of Archer"	April 2, 2025	0.4	5.70	0.1	1.68	0.5	7.28	
18	"Together One Last Time"	April 16, 2025	0.3	5.61	—N/a	—N/a	—N/a	—N/a	
19	"The Stories We Tell Ourselves"	April 23, 2025	0.4	5.38	0.1	1.70	0.5	7.08	
20	"Invisible Hand"	May 7, 2025	0.4	5.37	—N/a	—N/a	—N/a	—N/a	
21	"Baby Mine"	May 14, 2025	0.3	5.17	—N/a	—N/a	—N/a	—N/a	
22	"Out of Your Control"	May 21, 2025	0.4	5.81	—N/a	—N/a	—N/a	—N/a	
