= Chicago Med season 11 =

Season of television series

Chicago Med
- Season 11
- Showrunner: Allen MacDonald
- No. of episodes: 21

Release
- Original network: NBC
- Original release: October 1, 2025 – May 13, 2026

Season chronology
- ← Previous; Season 10 Next → Season 12

The eleventh season of Chicago Med, an American medical drama television series with executive producer Dick Wolf, and producers Michael Brandt, Derek Haas, Peter Jankowski and Allen MacDonald, was ordered on May 6, 2025 and premiered on October 1, 2025. The season had recurring themes of pregnancy, childbirth, and parenthood, consisting of 21 episodes.

== Cast ==
=== Main characters ===
- Steven Weber as Dr. Dean Archer, Attending Physician and Board certified in Trauma Surgery
- Jessy Schram as Dr. Hannah Asher, Attending Physician and Board certified in OBGYN
- Luke Mitchell as Dr. Mitchell Ripley, Attending Physician in Emergency Medicine
- Sarah Ramos as Dr. Caitlin Lenox, Chief of Emergency Medicine
- Darren Barnet as Dr. Jonathan Frost, Emergency Pediatrics resident and former television actor
- S. Epatha Merkerson as Sharon Goodwin, executive director of Patient and Medical Services at Gaffney Chicago Medical Center
- Oliver Platt as Dr. Daniel Charles, Chief of Psychiatry at Gaffney Chicago Medical Center

=== Recurring characters ===
- Brennan Brown as Dr. Samuel Abrams, Chief of Neurosurgery
- Lorena Diaz as Doris Perez, ED Charge Nurse
- Ashlei Sharpe Chestnut as Dr. Naomi Howard, newly qualified doctor in the ED
- Gregory Alan Williams as Bert Goodwin, Sharon's ex-husband
- Manish Dayal as Dr. Theo Rabari, an innovative psychiatrist
- Merrin Dungey as Dr. Jennifer Kingston, an oncologist at Gaffney
- Mike Pniewski as Mark Asher, Hannah's contractor father
- Luigi Sottile as Sean Archer, Dean's son, a recovery coach at a Florida clinic
- Mark Linn-Baker as Dr. Howie Mankiewicz, retired psychiatrist, close friend of Charles
- Brenda Strong as Dr. Suzie Mankiewicz
- Gbenga Akinnagbe as David Goodwin, Sharon's eldest son, a lawyer.
- Hope Lauren as Lynne Murphy Sullivan, widow of Ripley's best friend, Sully
- David Costabile as James Frost, Jon's father
- Tamlyn Tomita as Celeste Frost, Jon's mother
- Kim Quindlen as ED Nurse Kacy
- Logan Miller as Kip Lenox, Caitlin's brother
- Marie Tredway as ED Nurse Trini
- Lynnette Li as ED Nurse Nancy
- Hannah Riley as Anna Charles, Daniel's daughter, a college student
- Abby Corrigan as Dr. Vera Lovell, OBGYN associated with Gaffney
- Orlagh Cassidy as Miranda Lewis, an influential board member
- Marc Grapey as Peter Kalmick, Gaffney's Head of Legal
- Jeremy Shouldis as Dr. Marty Peterson, an anesthesiologist at Gaffney

=== Special guest stars ===
- Nick Gehlfuss as Dr. Will Halstead
- Torrey DeVitto as Dr. Natalie Manning
- Tracy Spiridakos as FBI Agent Hailey Upton
- Jesse Lee Soffer as Army Intelligence Officer Jay Halstead

=== Crossover characters ===
- Marina Squerciati as Detective Kim Burgess
- Hanako Greensmith as Paramedic Violet Mikami
- Jocelyn Hudon as Paramedic Lizzie Novak
- Taylor Kinney as Lt. Kelly Severide
- David Eigenberg as Lt. Christopher Herrmann
- Christian Stolte as Lt. "Mouch" McHolland
- Miranda Rae Mayo as Lt. Stella Kidd
- Joe Minoso as Firefighter Joe Cruz
- Brandon Larracuente as Firefighter Sal Vasquez
- Randy Flagler as Firefighter Harold Capp
- Dermot Mulroney as Chief Dom Pascal
- LaRoyce Hawkins as Officer Kevin Atwater
- Benjamin Levy Aguilar as Officer Dante Torres
- Arienne Mandi as Officer Eva Imani
- Amy Morton as Sgt. Trudy Platt
- Jason Beghe as Sgt. Hank Voight

== Episodes ==
No. overall	No. in season	Title	Directed by	Written by	Original airdate	Prod. code	U.S. viewers (millions)
199	1	"We All Fall Down"	Jonathan Brown	Allen MacDonald	October 1, 2025	1102	5.36
Maggie has resigned so Doris steps up as ED Charge Nurse. Frost treats a family of burn victims and discovers a fatality thought to be the wife was actually the husband's mistress. Ripley learns Asher is expecting and Archer is the father. Naomi Howard returns as a general surgery resident. Young ravers pulled from a collapsed building are cared for by the Gaffney staff: Charles counsels a boy with survivor's guilt while Lenox powers through an operation to separate fused sisters. Archer wraps his head around being a parent again at 64 years old.
200	2	"A Game of Inches"	Anna Dokoza	Andrew Gettens & Lauren MacKenzie	October 8, 2025	1101	5.05
As the ED staff dishes on the "Dasher" news, a visiting Will Halstead rushes in carrying Jasper, a downed teenage drug mule. Hostility between Ripley and Archer surfaces as they operate on a man whose artificial height extensions have become infected. Goodwin gives Halstead's young stepson, Owen, a notebook to journal about his upcoming brotherhood (his mother, Natalie Manning, and Will are expecting a baby). Asher discovers a soon-to-be father has gastric cancer. Lenox fearlessly stands up to an armed cocaine dealer in the OR who demands the stash in Jasper's stomach. Gunfire rings out. In Seattle, Manning is contacted by Goodwin: Owen has been shot.
201	3	"Horseshoes and Hand Grenades"	Anthony Nardolillo	Stephen Hootstein	October 15, 2025	1103	5.66
Manning is determined to donate a kidney to Owen despite the risk to her unborn child and discouragement from Halstead, Archer, and Asher. Charles jars back the memory of a naval lieutenant in a dissociative fugue state who was found in the Chicago River. Goodwin, Lenox, and Frost mediate when a brain dead man's estranged parents request to extract his sperm over his lover's objections. Archer and Asher succeed in the kidney transfer, sparing Manning's baby. Halstead learns how much Owen loves him from his journal and asks the recovering boy if he can adopt him.
202	4	"Found Family"	Tess Malone	Zoe Cheng	October 22, 2025	1105	5.28
Charles challenges automated FMRI diagnosis pushed by new psychiatrist Rabari when dealing with a furniture maker who deliberately severed his own hand. Frost bonds with a 10-year-old auto immune deficiency patient whose need for stem cells reveals an IVF mix-up in her biological parentage. Lenox tries to curb her reckless streak treating a violently abused newlywed. Ripley insists debt-ridden Frost become his roommate.
203	5	"What's Hiding in the Dark"	Rashidi Harper	Meridith Friedman	October 29, 2025	1104	5.42
Halloween haunts the ED. Asher and Archer argue over how to co-parent. Charles deals with turning 65 while helping a foster child who suffers from "demon-face" syndrome. Goodwin is shocked by a volatile outburst from her ex-husband, Bert, as his dementia worsens. Det. Kim Burgess is called in to investigate the whereabouts of a coed's newborn. Ripley trick-or-treats with Sadie and her daughter, assuring he's committed to them. Lenox marvels at her irresponsible brother's turnabout as her own personal behavior slides.
204	6	"The Story of Us"	Andi Behring	Deanna Shumaker	November 5, 2025	1106	5.35
Goodwin's offspring (including long absent David) gather for a complicated good-bye to their dying father. Asher gives romantic advice to Sadie on Ripley and Howard on Frost. Lenox connects with Jabo, a tattoo artist, as she traces his anemia to blood-poisoning. The search for the pet rabbit of a hornet-stung patient brings flirtatious sparks between Frost and paramedic Novak (from Firehouse 51). Sadie breaks up with Ripley.
205	7	"Double Down"	Anna Dokoza	Ashley Bower & Eli Jarmel	November 12, 2025	1108	5.63
A rainstorm knocks out power at Gaffney amid usual turmoil. Ripley stalls the discharge of Devin Carter, a suspected abuser, so Lenox can check on the welfare of his wife. A terminal patient undergoes surgery to attend his child's birth. Archer's son, Sean, supports him being a father again. Charles and Rabari come down on opposite sides of continuing a drug trial on a gymnast. Frost's mojo creates a romantic triangle with Novak and Howard. Lenox is attacked by Carter in his house.
206	8	"Triple Threat"	Jonathan Brown	Stephen Hootstein	January 7, 2026	1109	N/A
The day after the blackout, ED staffers face consequences for their actions. Lenox and Ripley cover for battered spouse, Faye, after she killed her husband who was holding them hostage. Goodwin reviews Archer and oncologist Kingston resuming a questionable surgery when the hospital's power went down. Charles considers retirement following his tough call denying a suicidal patient a heart transplant. Asher and Archer learn they are expecting a girl.
207	9	"Blindsided"	Cherie Nowlan	Andrew Gettens & Lauren MacKenzie	January 14, 2026	1107	N/A
Road rage lands three patients in the ED: Asher delivers the baby of a cab passenger, Ripley hunts for the driver's Filipino family to approve surgery, and Charles and Rabari evaluate the agitator with a misdiagnosed hormone deficiency. Frost's "Nick of Time" costar, Ian, asks he consider appearing in the series reboot. Archer does not hit it off with Asher's conservative contractor dad. Charles' panic attacks increase. Goodwin strives to recall positive times with her late ex, Bert, before his troubling final years.
208	10	"Frost on Fire"	Bethany Rooney	Meridith Friedman	January 21, 2026	1110	N/A
Frost clears paramedic Novak of overdosing a college basketball star when he proves the girl has an ultra rapid metabolism. Asher and Lenox discover an endangered second fetus in a surrogate. Ripley faces resistance from the grown abused daughter of a seemingly sweet dementia patient. Asher encourages Archer to date Kingston. Goodwin chooses a nursing home caregiver for a hospital externship over a board member's nephew. Mutual PTSD pushes Lenox and Ripley to hook up in a supply closet.
209	11	"Our So-Called Lives"	Elisabeth Rohm	Zoe Cheng	January 28, 2026	1111	N/A
Charles' longtime friends, Drs. Howie and Suzie Mankiewicz, have a devastating decision when she faces high-risk brain surgery or permanent disability. Archer locks horns with a rodeo rider who refuses treatment for spinal injuries. A year after Sully's death, his widow Lynne and Ripley spread his ashes at Wrigley Field. Kingston interferes with Asher's diagnosis of a pregnant ex-cancer patient. Suzie does not survive in the OR. Lenox and Ripley are inspired to take their relationship beyond the physical.
210	12	"Spill Your Guts"	Gonzalo Amat	Conor Patrick Hogan	February 4, 2026	1112	N/A
A trio of eager psych students shadow Charles on an intense day in the ED. Frost rejects his greedy, estranged parents when he and Asher treat an anemic teen whose mother sacrifices all to move them out of Chicago's cold. A patient who co-owns a pizza joint with his brother is diagnosed with celiac disease following a violent mental break. Goodwin performs an open heart procedure on a disgruntled board member during a chartered flight. One of Charles' charges switches majors after witnessing Lenox lose a young gunshot victim. Frost's fling with Novak intensifies.
211	13	"Reckoning, Part II"	Jonathan Brown	Meridith Friedman	March 4, 2026	1117	N/A
Gaffney's ED converts into an isolated ward as the staff masks up to treat victims of a contagious toxin. Archer is furious when Asher risks exposure to perform a c-section in an ambulance outside the secured perimeter. Fire Squad members Cruz and Capp are infected and admitted. Frost tends to his recent ex, Novak. Charles breaks the news of a young firefighter's death to her mother. FBI agent Hailey Upton and army black op Jay Halstead (both former Chicago P.D.) team with Goodwin, Sgt. Voight, Lenox, and Chief Pascal to track the local insurgent responsible for the outbreak. Note: This episode continues a crossover event that begins on Chicago Fire season 14 episode 13 and concludes on Chicago P.D. season 13 episode 13.
212	14	"Twist & Shout"	Jonathan Brown	Stephen Hootstein	March 11, 2026	1113	N/A
Drunken St. Patrick's Day revelers descend on the ED. Charles makes Frost see his distrust of a re-diagnosed bipolar patient stems from unresolved anger he holds for his parents. Archer and Lenox treat injured buddies when a bucket list stunt goes wrong. Asher traces a divorcing woman's surprise pregnancy to an Ambien-induced tryst with her ex. Ripley is speechless when Lenox openly acknowledges their affair to Goodwin.
213	15	"The Cost of Living"	Andi Behring	Andrew Gettens & Lauren Mackenzie	March 18, 2026	1114	N/A
Expecting parents Esme and Jeremy Lockhart return to Gaffney: she in labor, he about to succumb to cancer. Charles' CBD patient, a lottery winner who relies on a Magic 8 Ball, offers to fund Rabari's research if it will cure her. Frost's father, James, has been lying about having MS when his actual ailment is a spinal tumor. Asher delivers the Lockharts' daughter while Archer helps Jeremy record messages to be played after his death. Frost reluctantly agrees to act in the "Nick of Time" reboot, financing James' meds.
214	16	"The Book of Charles"	Cherie Nowlan	Allen MacDonald	April 1, 2026	1115	N/A
A fateful 24 hours for Charles begins with a disconnected caller on a suicide hotline. This leads to daily rounds at the ED involving hostile denial from Ripley's sexually assaulted patient, a vindictive hypochondriac treated by Lenox, and a young boy in Frost's care who behaves like a cat. Confrontations continue: arguments with his daughter, Anna, and Goodwin; a dead end from Officer Atwater tracking the lost call; hallucinations of his late mother. Charles ends the day suffering a stroke, collapsed in his office.
215	17	"Altered States"	Oscar Rene Lozoya II	Deanna Shumaker	April 8, 2026	1116	N/A
Neurosurgeon Abrams and Archer operate on Charles while he experiences guilty flashbacks of ex-wives, delinquent Ripley, Suzie Mankiewicz, and his difficult mother, leading to the discovery of his father's suicide as a teen. Asher objects to OBGYN Vera Lovell, Lenox's hipster replacement for her when she goes on maternity leave. Ripley and Frost both see Charles as an inspiring dad. The ED staff gathers in the waiting room. Memories confronted, Charles pulls through, waking with Goodwin at his hospital bedside.
216	18	"Things Left Unsaid"	Anthony Nardolillo	Brian Yorkey	April 22, 2026	1118	N/A
A lack of surgeons and space forces Archer, Asher, and Ripley to operate on a family of car crash victims in the ER. Rabari resents Charles' early return after rehab, particularly when a concussed football player is re-assessed with PTSD. Goodwin connects her son, David, with his embittered biological father, Spencer. Lenox pushes a grieving parent to approve risky surgery on his boy. Frost treats Howard's studly boyfriend only to end up in her arms at the shift's end. Ripley cools things with impulsive Lenox.
217	19	"Exit Strategies"	Cory Bowles	Stephen Hootstein & Dylan Johnson	April 29, 2026	1119	N/A
Asher meets with her dad following a patient's difficult delivery and discovers her resemblance to her late mother (who died at her birth) has kept him distant. Frost quits the "Nick of Time" revival when told his co-star is Ainsley, the actress who seduced him as a teen, and that his avid father, James, knew about the affair. Ripley befriends Kip, Lenox's flighty brother, and learns of their family's tragic history with prion disease. Goodwin and Howard return expensive gifts from a board member. Rabari flags Charles' post-stroke FMRI scans as a means to take his job. Lenox loses it when Ripley pieces together her positive GSS diagnosis.
218	20	"Hell Breaks Loose"	Anna Dokoza	Lauren Mackenzie & Andrew Gettens	May 6, 2026	1120	N/A
The ED fills with injured inmates from a prison riot. Archer realizes his feelings for Asher. Goodwin braces for a board meeting that will decide Charles' future at Gaffney. Frost's mother apologizes for his upbringing as family breadwinner. Asher goes into labor after correcting another expectant mom's breach birth. A dangerous prisoner escapes, putting the hospital on Code Silver. In lockdown, Lenox confesses she loves Ripley. Charles deduces sociopath Rabari's push for AI psych stems from personal failed therapy.
219	21	"Heaven Help Us"	Jonathan Brown	Teleplay by : Allen MacDonald & Meridith Friedman; Story by : Allen MacDonald	May 13, 2026	1121	N/A
Lockdown at the hospital resumes. Asher does a c-section on her patient between her own contractions. Charles hesitates to use evidence of Rabari's sociopathy to clear himself with the board. Frost shows up for his dad's last moments in hospice. Ripley refuses Lenox's offer to breakup. The stalking convict is apprehended, freeing Archer to attend his daughter, Mabel's, birth and let Asher know he loves her. Charles meets the grateful hotline caller he helped months before. His position at Gaffney is secured but Goodwin is accused of leaking Rabari's medical files and faces termination.

== Production ==
=== Casting ===
It was announced on August 28, 2025, that original cast member Marlyne Barrett was stepping back from the series, citing personal reasons, and would not be returning for Season 11. Barrett's character was said to have left the hospital prior to the season premiere.

Series showrunner Allen MacDonald said in an interview on May 25, 2025, that he planned to bring back "another original cast member or two". The returnees were later confirmed to be Nick Gehlfuss and Torrey DeVitto, who both returned in the second episode (which was also the show's 200th episode). Gehlfuss' return was announced ahead of time, but DeVitto's was kept a surprise until the episode aired. Both actors also appeared in the next episode which followed directly on from the previous one.

=== Crossover ===
A new three part crossover between Chicago Med and its two sister shows Chicago Fire and Chicago P.D. was announced on January 21, 2026. The episodes will form the 13th episodes of the season for each show, and they aired on March 4, 2026.

== Ratings ==
Viewership and ratings per episode of Chicago Med season 11
No.	Title	Air date	Rating (18–49)	Viewers (millions)	DVR (18–49)	DVR viewers (millions)	Total (18–49)	Total viewers (millions)	Ref.
1	"We All Fall Down"	October 1, 2025	0.4	5.36	0.1	1.64	0.5	6.99	
2	"A Game of Inches"	October 8, 2025	0.3	5.05	0.1	1.58	0.4	6.63	
3	"Horseshoes and Hand Grenades"	October 15, 2025	0.4	5.66	0.1	1.65	0.5	7.31	
4	"Found Family"	October 22, 2025	0.3	5.28	0.1	1.48	0.4	6.75	
5	"What's Hiding in the Dark"	October 29, 2025	0.3	5.42	0.1	1.57	0.5	6.99	
6	"The Story of Us"	November 5, 2025	0.4	5.35	0.1	1.54	0.5	6.89	
7	"Double Down"	November 12, 2025	0.3	5.63	—N/a	—N/a	—N/a	—N/a	
