= Curtiss Cook =

American actor (born 1968)

Curtiss Cook (born October 2, 1968) is an American character actor known for his roles in House of Cards, Manifest, Mayans M.C., Luke Cage, Narcos, and others.

== Early life and education ==
Cook was born in Dayton, Ohio on October 2, 1968. He studied at the Mountview Academy of Theatre Arts in London. As a teenager, he danced with the Dayton Contemporary Dance Company.

== Career ==
After college, Cook moved to New York, and appeared on Broadway in The Lion King and Miss Saigon. He also appeared in the films The Interpreter (2005) and Arbitrage (2012), and the television series House of Cards, Manifest, Mayans M.C., Luke Cage, Narcos and The Chi, among others. He plays Abe in the Steven Spielberg film adaptation of West Side Story.

== Filmography ==
=== Film ===
| Year | Title | Role | Notes |
|---|---|---|---|
| 2003 | Virgin | Security Guard | Uncredited |
| 2003 | Second Born | Bike Messenger | |
| 2005 | The Interpreter | Ajene Xola | |
| 2005 | Confess | Security Guard | Uncredited |
| 2007 | The Girl in the Park | Park Cop | |
| 2008 | Seemless | Trenton La'Chance | |
| 2009 | City Island | Matt Cruniff | |
| 2009 | Breaking Point | Byron Young | |
| 2010 | Shutter Island | Trey Washington | |
| 2012 | Arbitrage | Det. Mills | |
| 2013 | All Is Bright | Kevin | |
| 2016 | Bear with Us | Stanley Carter | |
| 2016 | Destined | Mr. Davis | |
| 2017 | Roxanne Roxanne | Dave | |
| 2018 | Madeline's Madeline | George | |
| 2019 | Remember Amnesia | Mr. Marks | |
| 2019 | Inside Game | U.S. Attorney | |
| 2021 | West Side Story | Abe | |
| 2022 | The Devil You Know | Anthony Cowans | |
| 2024 | Carry-On | Lionel Williams | |

=== Television ===
| Year | Title | Role | Notes |
|---|---|---|---|
| 1995 | Late Night with Conan O'Brien | Various roles | 1 episode |
| 2002 | The Job | Uniformed Cop | 2 episodes |
| 2002 | The Sopranos | Credenso Curtis | Episode: "Whitecaps" |
| 2002–2009 | Law & Order | Lucien Blair / Darnell Marbury | 2 episodes |
| 2004 | Rescue Me | Project Resident | Episode: "Guts" |
| 2005 | Law & Order: Trial by Jury | Detective Kwame Blakely | Episode: "41 Shots" |
| 2007–2010 | Law & Order: Criminal Intent | Garvin / Ron Robbins | 3 episodes |
| 2008 | Canterbury's Law | Detective Polone | Episode: "Trade-Off" |
| 2008 | New Amsterdam | Ray de la Cruz | Episode: "Love Hurts" |
| 2009 | The Good Wife | Clarence Wilcox | Episode: "Conjugal" |
| 2009 | Cop House | Donnie Sneed | Television film |
| 2010 | How to Make It in America | Alex | 2 episodes |
| 2010 | Person of Interest | Terrence King | Episode: "Legacy" |
| 2013 | Golden Boy | Lyle Creasmen | Episode: "Just Say No" |
| 2013 | Blue Bloods | Detective Jones | Episode: "This Way Out" |
| 2013–2017 | House of Cards | Terry Womack | 18 episodes |
| 2014 | The Leftovers | Patrick Johansen | Episode: "Guest" |
| 2014–2015 | A Black Man Acting | Various roles | 12 episodes |
| 2016 | Elementary | Detective Sybert | Episode: "Render, and Then Seize Her" |
| 2016–2018 | Luke Cage | 'Pistol Pete' Stokes | 2 episodes |
| 2017 | Bull | Dean Poole | Episode: "E.J." |
| 2017 | Narcos | Gilbert Mills | Episode: "Follow the Money" |
| 2018 | Mayans M.C. | Bowen | 5 episodes |
| 2018–2020 | The Bold Type | Marcus Edison | 2 episodes |
| 2018–2023 | Manifest | Radd Campbell | 4 episodes |
| 2019–2024 | The Chi | Otis 'Douda' Perry | 48 episodes |
| 2020 | Tommy | Deputy Chief Castro | Episode: "19 Hour Day" |
| 2020 | Rita | Spencer | Television film |
| 2021 | Pose | Thomas | Episode: "Intervention" |
| 2021–2022 | Chicago Med | Lieutenant Reginald Scott | 4 episodes |

=== Videogames ===
| Year | Title | Role | Notes |
|---|---|---|---|
| 2005 | The Warriors | Virgil | |
| 2008 | Grand Theft Auto IV | Street preacher | Uncredited |
| 2009 | Grand Theft Auto IV: The Lost and Damned | Street preacher | Dialogue reused from the original game |
| 2009 | Grand Theft Auto: The Ballad of Gay Tony | Street preacher | Dialogue reused from the original game |
| 2009 | Grand Theft Auto: Chinatown Wars | Street preacher | Dialogue reused from the original game |
