= Devin Kawaoka =

American actor

Devin Kawaoka (born c. 1983) is an American actor who appeared in Jeremy O. Harris' Slave Play on Broadway. He is best known for his work as Charlie on Apple TV+'s Shrinking and as Dr. Kai Tanaka-Reed on Chicago Med.

== Biography ==
Kawaoka, who is half-Japanese, grew up in Rochester, New York and attended Brighton High School. During high school, he was an avid skier. He attended New York University as an undergraduate and, later, at the Graduate Acting Program on a full merit scholarship. He won the Rosemarie Tichler Award for his performance in Unnatural Acts at the Classic Stage Company.

Kawaoka was on stage in Jeremy O. Harris' Slave Play, first on Broadway, and then at the Mark Taper Forum in Los Angeles.

He is currently in a recurring role on the NBC series Chicago Med portraying surgical resident Dr. Kai Tanaka-Reed, as well as a recurring role portraying Charlie on the Apple TV+ comedy series Shrinking.

== Filmography ==
=== Film ===
Year	Title	Role	Notes
2021	Under the Lantern Lit Sky	Adam	
2021	The Manor	Gary	

=== Television ===
Year	Title	Role	Notes
2017	Criminal Minds	Kal Montgomery	Episode: "Neon Terror"
2021	Lucifer	Cody	Episode: "The Death of Lucifer Morningstar"
2021	Goliath	Deputy Counsel Mark Allbritton	Episode: "Split Milk"
2022–present	Chicago Med	Kai Tanaka-Reed	21 episodes
2023–present	Shrinking	Charlie	15 episodes
2025–present	Chicago Fire	Kai Tanaka-Reed	Episode: "Permanent Damage"

== Theater ==
Year	Title	Role	Venue	Notes
2021	Slave Play	Dustin	August Wilson Theater	Broadway
