= Herson (surname) =

Herson is a surname. Notable people with the surname include:

- Leslie Herson (1942–2008), American businesswoman and artist
- Michael H. Herson, American lobbyist

== See also ==
- Henson (name)
- Merson
