= Merkerson =

Merkerson is a surname. Notable people with the surname include:

- Da'Mon Merkerson (born 1989), American football player
- Ron Merkerson (born 1975), American football player
- S. Epatha Merkerson (born 1952), American actress

== See also ==
- Merson
