= Lydia Hamilton Smith =

American businesswoman and housekeeper (died 1884)

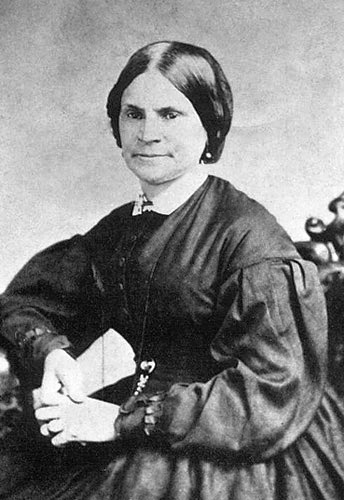
- Born: c. 1814; Adams County, Pennsylvania, U.S.
- Died: February 14, 1884 (aged 69–70); Lancaster, Pennsylvania, U.S.
- Occupations: Housekeeper, businesswoman
- Years active: 1840s–1884
- Known for: Housekeeper and confidante to Thaddeus Stevens; abolitionist activities
- Spouse: Jacob Smith (m. 1833; died 1852)
- Partner: Thaddeus Stevens (1848–1868)

Lydia Hamilton Smith (c. 1814 – February 14, 1884) was an American businesswoman and the long-time housekeeper and confidante of Thaddeus Stevens, later becoming a prominent entrepreneur after his death.

== Early life ==
Lydia Hamilton was born as a free person (her father was a Scottish immigrant; her mother had a white mother and black father) at Russell Tavern near Gettysburg in Adams County, Pennsylvania. There is uncertainty over her date of birth; 1813 is the date on her tombstone. There are other sources that cite 1814; her death certificate and obituarites posted in Lancaster and Washington D.C. list 1815. She had been the wife of a black Gettysburg barber, Jacob Smith, but they were living apart when she was employed by Stevens as a housekeeper (in 1844 or 1847). She had two children by Smith, and they remained with her in her employment. Jacob Smith died in 1852.

== Career with Stevens ==
Separated from her husband, Smith moved with her mother and sons to Lancaster, Pennsylvania and accepted a position as housekeeper to a prominent lawyer and abolitionist, the unmarried Thaddeus Stevens, who had moved from Gettysburg in 1842 but practiced law and had business interests in several counties in the Susquehanna River basin. Stevens was elected to the U.S. House of Representatives in 1858, and Smith continued to keep house for him (including his house in Washington, D.C.) until his death in 1868.

Smith was described as "giving great attention to her appearance," and in later years she had her clothes made to resemble those of Mary Lincoln. American poet Carl Sandburg described Smith as "a comely quadroon with Caucasian features and a skin of light-gold tint, a Roman Catholic communicant with Irish eyes ... quiet, discreet, retiring, reputed for poise and personal dignity."

Smith had two sons, William and Isaac (by Jacob Smith), whom Stevens helped to raise. She and Stevens also raised two of Stevens' nephews, whom he had adopted in the 1840s. On April 2, 1861, her older son William fatally shot himself while handling a pistol at Stevens' home, as his mother watched. William Smith was 26 years old and had worked as a shoemaker in Lancaster. Her other son, Isaac Smith, a banjo player and barber, enlisted in the 6th United States Colored Infantry Regiment in 1863 and served in Virginia.

The exact nature of the relationship between Stevens and Smith is unclear. In the one brief surviving letter from Stevens to her, he addresses her as "Mrs. Smith," unusual deference to an African-American servant in that era. Family members also asked Stevens to be remembered to "Mrs. Smith." Nonetheless, during her time with Stevens, neighbors considered her his common-law wife. Smith not only handled social functions for the politician, she also mingled with Stevens' guests, who were instructed to address her as "Madame" or "Mrs. Smith." Opposition newspapers (for Stevens' views concerning racial equality were quite controversial) claimed she was frequently called "Mrs. Stevens" by people who knew her.

Smith was at Stevens' bedside when he died in Washington, D.C., on August 11, 1868, along with his friend Simon Stevens and surviving nephew (Thaddeus Stevens Jr.), two African-American nuns, and several others. Under Stevens' will, Smith was allowed to choose between a lump sum of $5,000 or a $500 annual allowance; she was also allowed to take any furniture in his house. With the inheritance, Smith purchased Stevens' house and the adjoining lot.

== Abolitionist and businesswoman ==
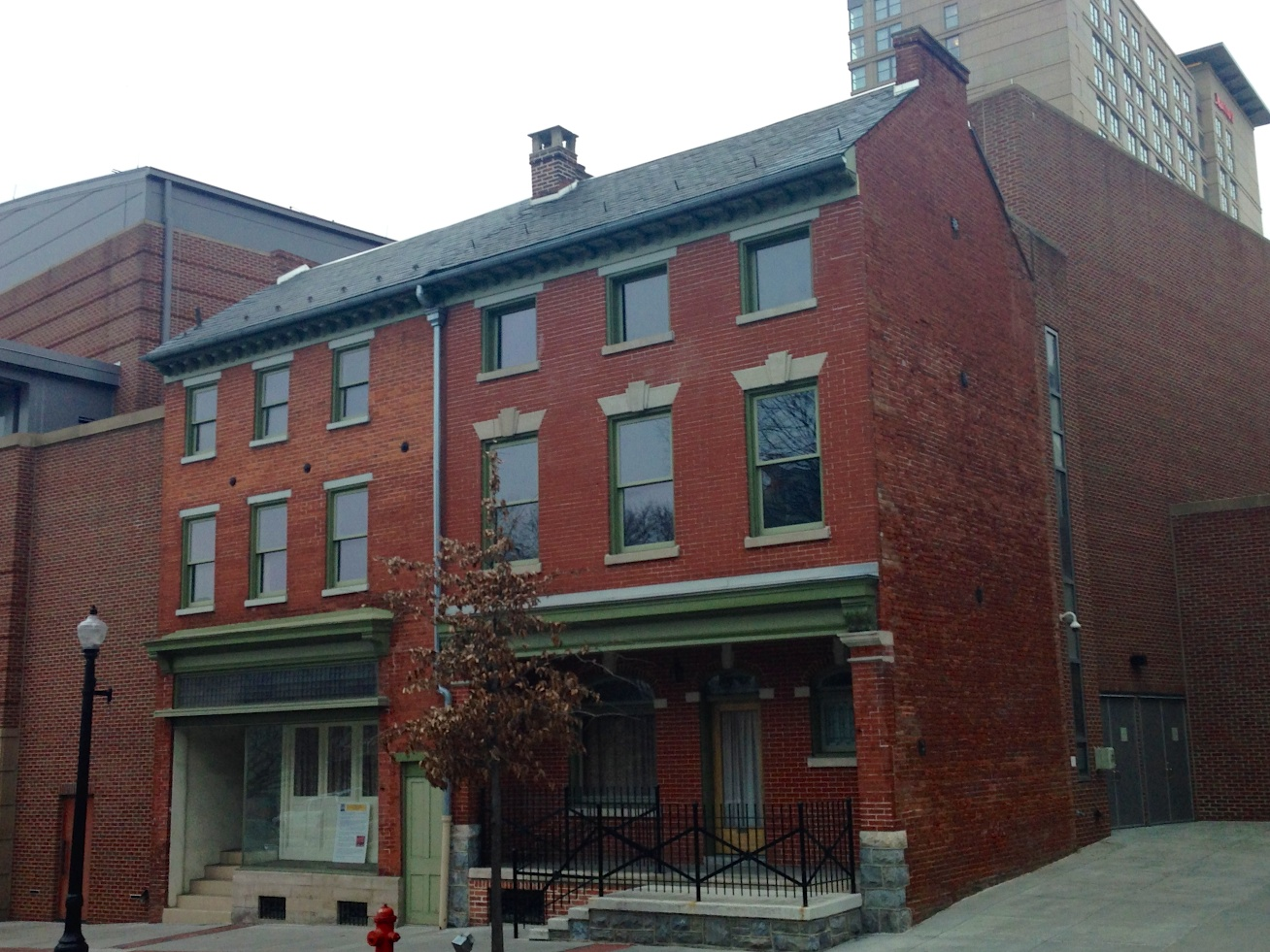
Exterior of Lydia Hamilton Smith house in Lancaster

Stevens and Smith were active in the Underground Railroad, which led to the burning of his ironworks, Caledonia Furnace, during the Civil War. Recent excavation of their house in Lancaster unearthed a cistern with a passageway to a nearby tavern, as well as a spittoon inside, which some historians think was used to shelter escaping slaves. Smith bought her house in Lancaster next to Stevens' house in 1860. During and after the Battle of Gettysburg in 1863, Smith hired a horse and wagon, and collected food and supplies for the wounded of both sides from neighbors in Adams, York and Lancaster counties and delivered them to the makeshift hospitals. After Stevens' death in 1868, in addition to buying his house in Lancaster, Smith operated a prosperous boarding house across from the Willard Hotel in Washington, D.C., and invested in real estate and other business ventures.

== Death and legacy ==
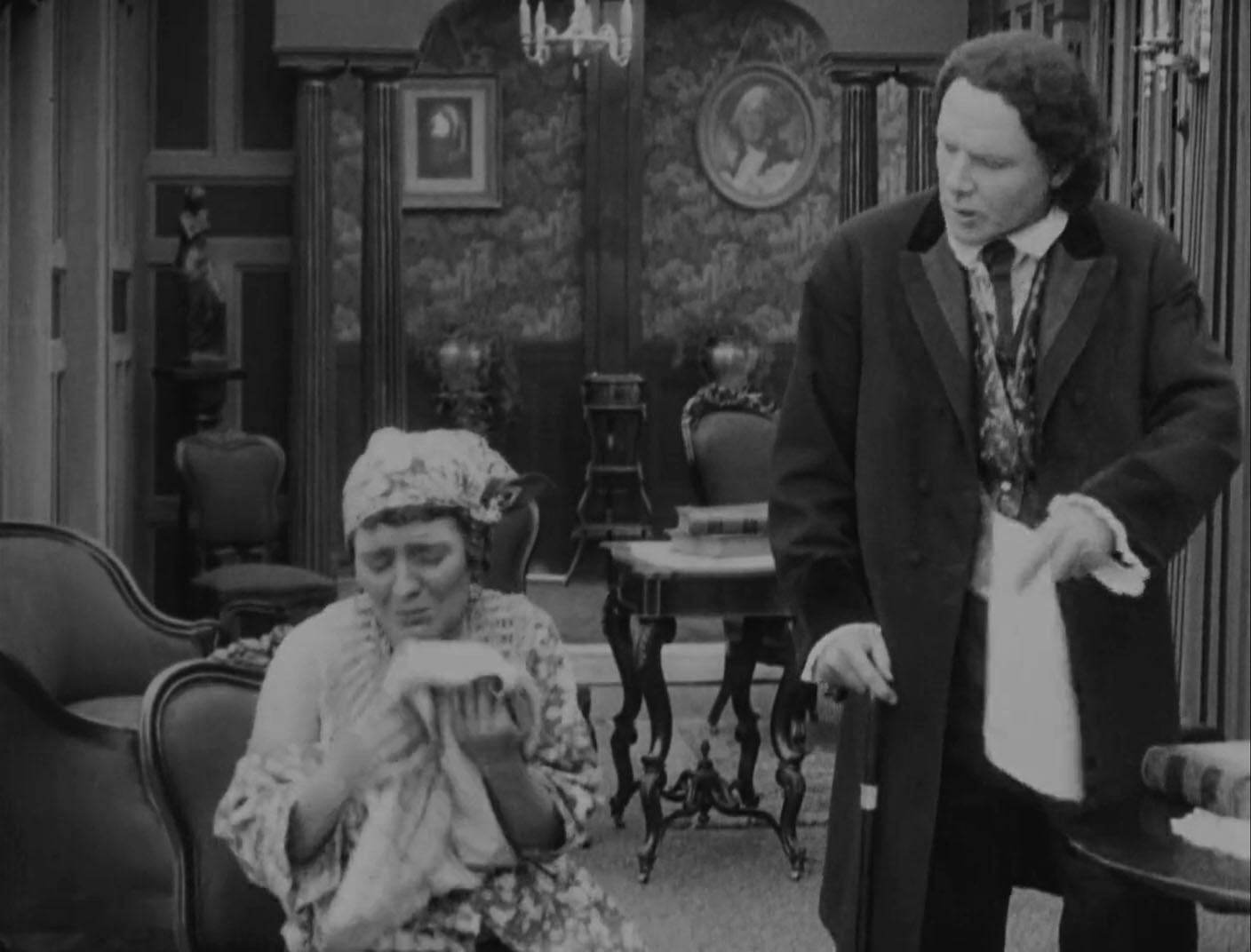
In the 1915 film The Birth of a Nation, Representative Austin Stoneman (played by Ralph Lewis) and his housekeeper Lydia Brown (played by Mary Alden) are considered as standing for Thaddeus Stevens and Lydia Hamilton Smith.

Lydia Hamilton Smith died in Washington on her 71st birthday in 1884 and, per her wishes, was buried in St. Mary's Catholic Cemetery in Lancaster, although she also left money for the continued upkeep of Stevens' grave at the Shreiner-Concord cemetery.

In Steven Spielberg's 2012 film Lincoln, Smith was portrayed by actress S. Epatha Merkerson. The film assumes that she did have sexual relations with Stevens and that they acted as a married couple in every way, and a scene of the film depicts the two of them privately celebrating the hard-fought passage of the Thirteenth Amendment.

In the 21st century, a historical group in Lancaster, Pennsylvania has mounted a campaign intended to convert the existing 'Thaddeus Stevens & Lydia Hamilton Smith Historic Site' into 'The Thaddeus Stevens & Lydia Hamilton Smith Center for History and Democracy', with plans to open in 2025.
