= Ralph Korngold =

Journalist and author (1882–1964)

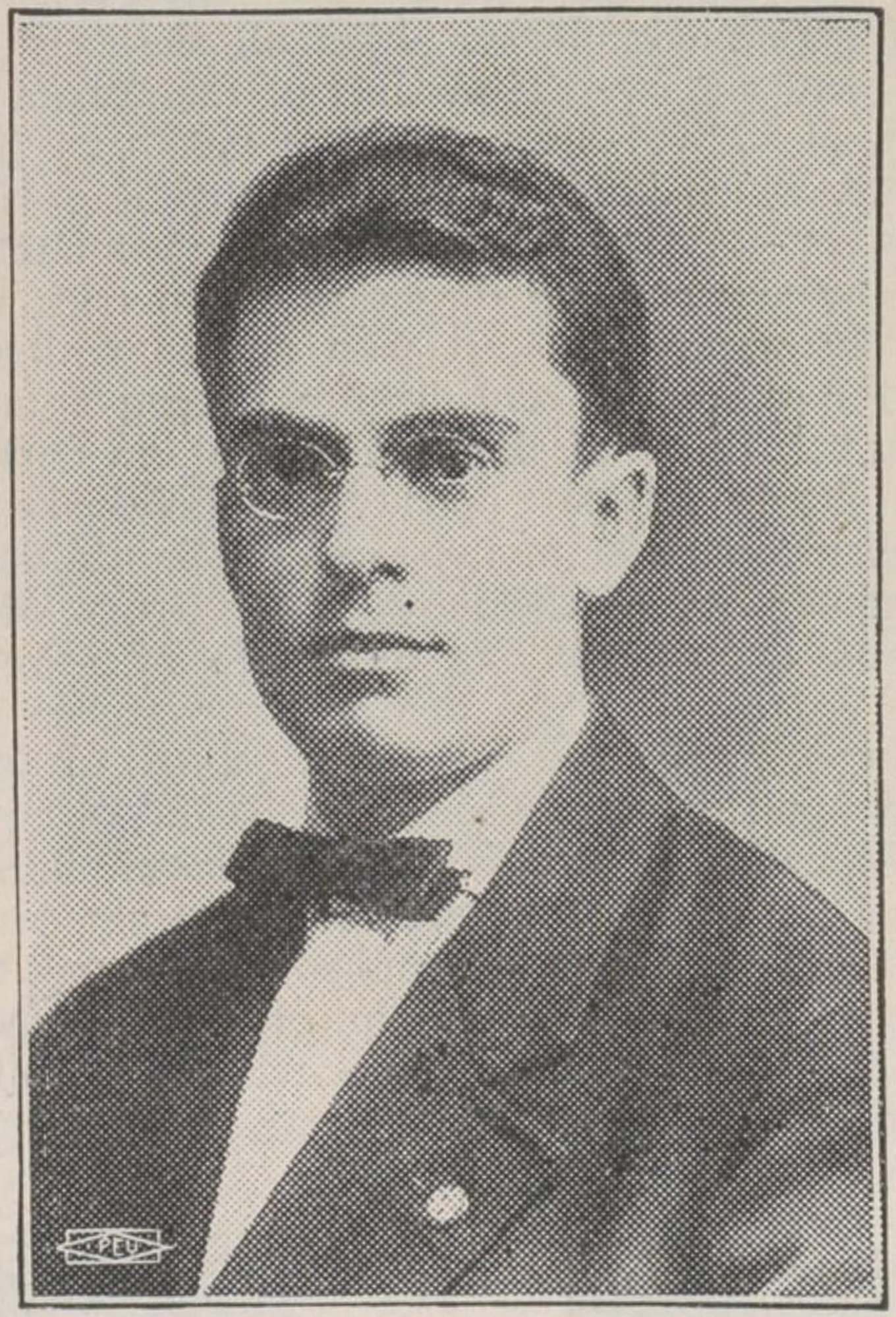
Korngold c. 1912

Ralph Korngold (1882–1964) was a Polish-born author and businessman. He is best remembered as a leading public propagandist for the Socialist Party of America during the decade of the 1910s and as a biographer of Maximilien Robespierre.

== Biography ==
=== Early years ===
Ralph Korngold was born in Warsaw, Poland, in 1882, the son of ethnic Jewish parents. His father was a diamond merchant from the Netherlands, while his mother hailed from Poland. Included in the family were one brother and two sisters.

Korngold spent most of his childhood in the city of Amsterdam. It was there that he got his start as a writer for the daily newspaper De Telegraaf (The Telegraph), which published his first work when Korngold was just 17. Korngold also began pursuing a literary career and at age 19 won a prize for a short story published in the literary journal De Twintigst Eeuw. (The Twentieth Century).

Korngold emigrated to the United States in 1903, continuing to work for De Telegraaf as its correspondent.

=== Socialist ===
In 1908 Korngold joined the Socialist Party of America, soon moving to Chicago to join the staff of the Chicago Daily Socialist.

Korngold became a touring lecturer on behalf of the Socialist Party's National Lyceum Course in 1911, speaking on behalf of the party to audiences across the United States.

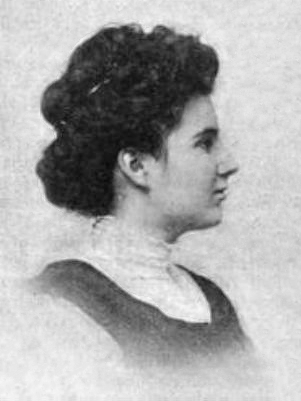
Janet Fenimore, 1909

In 1912, he married a fellow Socialist Party member, Janet Fenimore, with whom he had one child, Arnold "Bud" Dresden.

Korngold was made the head of the Socialist Party's Literature Department in 1914, an operation run out of party headquarters in Chicago. He was also the business manager of the party's weekly newspaper, The American Socialist, from the time of its establishment in 1914.

=== Writer ===
Korngold left the Socialist movement some time shortly after the onset of World War I. He entered the world of business, becoming at one point the president of a successful cutlery business, bankrolling enough capital to pursue his passion for writing.

In 1924 the family went abroad, with Korngold hoping to become a successful fiction writer living the French Riviera, however his wife was unable to become acclimated to life in Europe. The couple split in 1926, with Janet returning with son Bud to America.

Financial troubles associated with the Great Depression forced Korngold to leave France for America again in 1930, where he returned to Chicago and the world of business. He returned to France three years later, shifting his literary work from fiction to the writing of a biography of Maximilien Robespierre.

In Paris Korngold met a Hungarian woman named Piri Helen Ozer, whom he married in 1936 following the finalization of his divorce. In that same year he published his Robespierre biography, Robespierre, the First Modern Dictator.

The Fall of France to Nazi Germany in 1940 forced Korngold to make a hasty departure from Europe. Korngold returned to the United States and a career in business until a 1946 heart attack forced his retirement.

=== Death and legacy ===
Following his retirement from commerce, Korngold and his wife moved to Santa Barbara, California, where Ralph resumed his writing career. He ultimately published seven works of historical biography beginning with his 1936 Robespierre book.

Ralph Korngold died October 27, 1964.

Korngold's papers are held by the Newberry Library in Chicago, Illinois.

== Works ==
- Brain Jolters. Milwaukee: Milwaukee Social-Democratic Publishing Co., n.d. [1911].
- Are There Classes in America? Chicago: Socialist Party, 1914.
- Socialist Congressional Campaign Book. With Carl D. Thompson. Chicago: Socialist Party, 1914.
- Plan for the Systematic Distribution of Leaflets. Chicago: Socialist Party, n.d. [c. 1914].
- "Protect Your Rights" in The Price We Pay : Protect Your Rights. With Irwin St. John Tucker. Chicago: Socialist Party, n.d. [1917].
- "Revolutionary Romanticists: Letter to the Editor of the New York Call," New York Call, vol. 12, no. 104 (April 14, 1919), pg. 8.
- Robespierre: First Modern Dictator. London: Macmillan, 1937. —English edition following the French-language edition of 1936.
- Saint-Just. Albert Lehmann, trans. Paris: B. Grasset, 1937. —In French.
- Robespierre and the Fourth Estate. New York: Modern Age Books, 1941.
- Citizen Toussaint. Boston: Little, Brown and Co., 1944.
- Two Friends of Man: The story of William Lloyd Garrison and Wendell Phillips and Their Relationship with Abraham Lincoln. Boston: Little, Brown and Co., 1950.
- Thaddeus Stevens: A Being Darkly Wise and Rudely Great. New York: Harcourt, Brace, 1955.
- The Last Years of Napoleon: His Captivity on St. Helena. New York: Harcourt, Brace, 1959.
