= S. Epatha Merkerson =

American actress (born 1952)

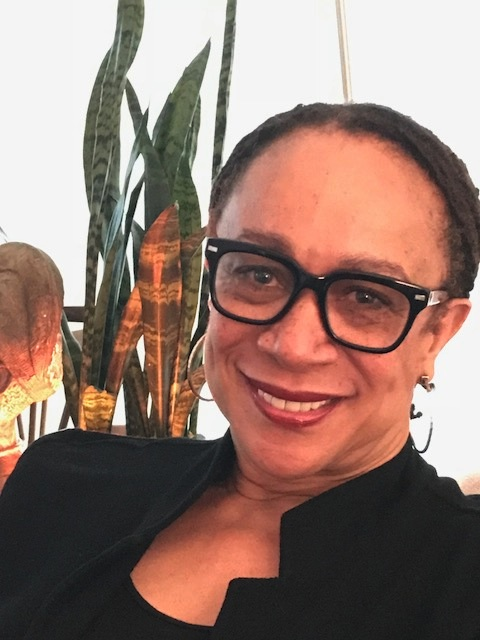
- Merkerson in 2017
- Born: Sharon Epatha Merkerson; November 28, 1952 (age 73); Saginaw, Michigan, U.S.
- Education: Wayne State University (BFA), New York University (MFA)
- Occupation: Actress
- Years active: 1976-present

S. Epatha Merkerson (Note: Merkerson has stated that her current legal name is S. Epatha Merkerson even though she was born Sharon Epatha Merkerson.) (born Sharon Epatha Merkerson; November 28, 1952) is an American actress. She has received accolades for her work, including an Emmy Award, a Golden Globe Award, a Screen Actors Guild Award, four NAACP Image Awards, two Obie Awards, and two Tony Award nominations. She is known for her portrayal of NYPD Lieutenant Anita Van Buren on the NBC police procedural drama series Law & Order, a role she played from 1993 to 2010, appearing in 388 episodes of the series. She is also known for playing Reba the Mail Lady on Pee-wee's Playhouse and Sharon Goodwin in the NBC medical drama Chicago Med since the series premiered in November 2015.

== Early life ==
Merkerson was born Sharon Epatha Merkerson in Saginaw, Michigan, and raised in Detroit. She is the youngest of five children raised by her mother Ann who worked for the post office.

During a segment on the January 31, 2012, episode of The Wendy Williams Show, when asked about the origin of her name, Merkerson said that "Epatha" was the name of "a grade-school teacher who was influential in keeping her father in school". Merkerson graduated from Cooley High School in 1970 and earned her Bachelor of Fine Arts in theatre at Wayne State University in 1976. She was made an Honorary Doctor of Humane Letters by Wayne State University in May 2009.

== Career ==
In 1978, she moved to New York City, where she obtained her Master of Fine Arts from New York University part time.

Merkerson made her television debut as Reba the Mail Lady on Pee-wee's Playhouse. Merkerson has also appeared on The Cosby Show, among other series.

She first appeared in the NBC police procedural drama Law & Order in "Mushrooms" (Season 1: Episode 17) as the grief-stricken mother of an 11-month-old boy who is shot accidentally. Her performance impressed the producers enough to select Merkerson to replace Dann Florek as detective squad chief in the series' fourth season, making her one of the few actors to secure a main role after an initial single appearance on the show.

Merkerson's career began to rise after she assumed the lead role in the one-woman play Lady Day at Emerson's Bar and Grill. That was followed by her performance as Berniece in August Wilson's Pulitzer Prize–winning play The Piano Lesson. For that, she was nominated for a Tony Award as Best Featured Actress in a Play. Merkerson has also won two Obie Awards for her work in I'm Not Stupid and Birdie Blue, a Helen Hayes Award for The Old Settler, and a Lucille Lortel nomination for F**king A by Suzan-Lori Parks. Her screen credits include Jacob's Ladder, Loose Cannons, She's Gotta Have It, James Cameron's Terminator 2: Judgment Day; and Navy SEALs. In 2006, she won a Golden Globe Award, an Emmy Award and a Screen Actors Guild award for her performance in the HBO film Lackawanna Blues. In 2007, she starred as Lola Delaney in the Los Angeles stage production of William Inge's Come Back, Little Sheba. In January 2008 the production opened a successful run on Broadway and earned Merkerson her second Tony nomination.

On April 1, 2010, it was confirmed that after 17 seasons, Merkerson would leave Law & Order at the end of the show's twentieth season. Her departure from Law & Order, which aired on May 24, 2010, was also originally the show's final episode (until the show was revived by NBC in 2022, but Merkerson was unable to return due to starring in another NBC program, Chicago Med). In total, Merkerson appeared on the series for 17 consecutive seasons—395 episodes—which was more than any other actor associated with the program.

In 2012, Merkerson became the host of Find Our Missing, a reality-reenactment series on TV One which profiles missing people of color. She performed in Steven Spielberg's 2012 film Lincoln as Lydia Hamilton Smith, housekeeper to Tommy Lee Jones's character, Congressman Thaddeus Stevens.

In 2014, Merkerson appeared in the Primary Stages production of While I Yet Live, written by Billy Porter. In 2015, she joined the cast of NBC medical drama Chicago Med as Sharon Goodwin, Chief of Patient and Medical Services. The series was conceived and written by Law & Order creator Dick Wolf, along with Matt Olmstead, Derek Haas and Michael Brandt. In 2014, Merkerson became a spokesperson for Merck America's Diabetes Challenge, to increase Type 2 diabetes awareness among African Americans.

== Personal life ==
Merkerson appeared on the television series of Henry Louis Gates' Finding Your Roots on February 5, 2019 (Season 5, Episode 5), in which she revealed that she was a descendant of Isaac Hawkins and eight others of the 272 enslaved people who were sold in the 1838 Jesuit slave sale by Jesuit priests. These priests owned plantations on which the enslaved people tilled tobacco; proceeds from the sale were used to pay off the debts of the Jesuit-operated Georgetown College (now Georgetown University).

== Filmography ==
=== Film ===
Year	Title	Role	Notes
1986	She's Gotta Have It	Dr. Jamison	
1990	Loose Cannons	Officer Rachel	
1990	Jacob's Ladder	Elsa	
1990	Navy SEALs	Jolena "Jo"	
1991	Terminator 2: Judgment Day	Tarissa Dyson	
1999	Random Hearts	Nea	
2001	The Rising Place	Lessie Watson	
2003	Radio	Maggie	
2004	Jersey Girl	Doctor	
2005	Lackawanna Blues	Rachel "Nanny" Crosby	
2006	Black Snake Moan	Angela	
2007	Slipstream	Bonnie	
2009	The Six Wives of Henry Lefay	Effa	
2009	Mother and Child	Ada	
2012	Find Our Missing	Herself	
2012	Lincoln	Lydia Smith	
2013	Tyler Perry Presents Peeples	Daphne Peeples	
2015	The Challenger	Jada Miller	
2016	Year by the Sea	Liz	
2023	We Grown Now	Anita	
2025	Eye for an Eye	May	

=== Television ===
Year	Title	Role	Notes
1986–1989	Pee-wee's Playhouse	Reba, The Mail Lady	16 episodes
1988	The Cosby Show	Book Club Member #5	Episode: "Bookworm"
1989	CBS Summer Playhouse	Jimmie	Episode: "Elysian Fields"
1990	Equal Justice	Mrs. Walters	Episode: "Pilot"
1991	Law & Order	Denise Winters	Episode: "Mushrooms"
1992	Mann & Machine	Captain Margaret Claghorn	9 episodes
1992–1993	Here and Now	Ms. St. Marth	12 episodes
1993–2010	Law & Order	Lieutenant Anita Van Buren	388 episodes Nominated - NAACP Image Award for Outstanding Actress in a Drama Series (1997–1999 & 2001); Nominated - Screen Actors Guild Award for Outstanding Performance by an Ensemble in a Drama Series (1997–2002 & 2004); NAACP Image Award for Outstanding Supporting Actress in a Drama Series (2006 & 2010–2011); Nominated - NAACP Image Award for Outstanding Supporting Actress in a Drama Series (2007–2009)
1994	A Place for Annie	Alice	TV movie
1995	A Mother's Prayer	Ruby	TV movie
1998	Exiled	Lieutenant Anita Van Buren	TV movie
2000	Frasier	Dr. McCaskill	Episode: "Dark Side of the Moon"
2001	Art:21	Herself	Episode: "Spirituality"
2001	A Girl Thing	Lani	TV movie
2002	Law & Order: Criminal Intent	Lieutenant Anita Van Buren	Episode: "Badge"
2005	Law & Order: Trial by Jury	Lieutenant Anita Van Buren	Episode: "Skeleton"
2005	Lackawanna Blues	Rachel "Nanny" Crosby	TV movie Golden Globe Award for Best Actress – Miniseries or Television Film; Gracie Allen Award for Outstanding Female Lead in a Miniseries; NAACP Image Award for Outstanding Actress in a Television Movie, Mini-Series or Dramatic Special; Primetime Emmy Award for Outstanding Lead Actress in a Miniseries or a Movie; Prism Award for Performance in a Television Movie or Miniseries; Screen Actors Guild Award for Outstanding Performance by a Female Actor in a Miniseries or Television Movie; Nominated - Independent Spirit Award for Best Female Lead; Nominated - Satellite Award for Best Actress – Miniseries or Television Film
2007	The Closer	Dr. Rebecca Dioli	3 episodes
2007	Girl, Positive	Ariel Winters	TV movie Nominated - NAACP Image Award for Outstanding Actress in a Television Movie, Mini-Series or Dramatic Special
2012	Drop Dead Diva	Judge Hiller	Episode: "Lady Parts"
2013	The Good Wife	Judge Melanie Ellis	Episode: "Going for the Gold"
2013	Deception	Beverly	3 episodes
2014	The Gabby Douglas Story	Miss Caroline	TV movie
2015	Being Mary Jane	Mark's Mother	Episode: "Freedom"
2015–present	Chicago Med	Sharon Goodwin	Main
2015–present	Chicago Fire	Sharon Goodwin	5 episodes
2016–present	Chicago P.D.	Sharon Goodwin	5 episodes
2023	Poker Face	Joyce Carter	Episode: "Time of the Monkey"

=== Stage ===
Year	Title	Role	Notes
1980	Tintypes	Miss Thigpen	John Golden Theatre, Broadway
1987	Lady Day at Emerson's Bar and Grill	Billie Holiday (Understudy)	Vineyard Theatre, Off-Broadway
1988	Fucking A	Hester	Public Theater, Off-Broadway
1990	The Piano Lesson	Berniece	Walter Kerr Theatre, Broadway
1991	I'm Not Stupid	Mother	Young Playwrights Festival
1998	The Old Settler	Elizabeth	Studio Theatre, Washington DC
2005	Birdie Blue	Birdie	Second Stage Theater, Off-Broadway
2007	Come Back, Little Sheba	Lola	Kirk Douglas Theatre
2008	Come Back, Little Sheba	Lola	Biltmore Theater, Broadway
2014	While I Yet Live	Maxine	Primary Stages, Off-Broadway
2017	The Roommate	Sharon	Williamstown Theatre Festival
2019	A Raisin in the Sun	Lena Younger	Williamstown Theatre Festival
2027	Night, Mother	Thelma "Mama" Cates	Goodman Theatre

== Awards and nominations ==
Awards

- 1992 Obie Award Outstanding Performance (I'm Not Stupid)
- 1999 Helen Hayes Award Outstanding Lead Actress-Resident Play (The Old Settler)
- 2002 Regulus Award For her dedication to lung cancer awareness and education
- 2005 Emmy Award for Outstanding Lead Actress in a Miniseries or a Movie (Lackawanna Blues)
- 2006 SunDeis Film Festival at Brandeis University Entertainer of the Year Award
- 2006 Screen Actors Guild Award Outstanding Performance by a Female Actor in a Television Movie or Miniseries (Lackawanna Blues)
- 2006 PRISM Award Performance in a TV Movie or Miniseries (Lackawanna Blues)
- 2006 Obie Award Outstanding Performance (Birdie Blue)
- 2006 NAACP Image Award Best Supporting Actress in a Drama Series (Law & Order)
- 2006 NAACP Image Award Best Actress in a Made for TV Movie, Miniseries or Dramatic Special (Lackawanna Blues)
- 2006 Gracie Allen Award Outstanding Female Lead – Miniseries (Lackawanna Blues)
- 2006 Golden Globe Award for Best Performance by an Actress in a Mini-Series or a Motion Picture Made for Television (Lackawanna Blues)
- 2006 Black Reel Award Best Actress in a Made for TV Movie or Miniseries (Lackawanna Blues)
- 2010 NAACP Image Award Best Supporting Actress in a Drama Series (Law & Order)
- 2011 NAACP Image Award Best Supporting Actress in a Drama Series (Law & Order)
- 2017 Honorary Degree,

Doctor of Letters, University of Pittsburgh

- 2013 Honorary Degree, Doctor of Letters,

Montclair State University

- 2012 Honorary Degree, Doctor of Letters, University of Maryland Eastern Shore
- 2009 Honorary Degree,

Doctor of Letters, Wayne State University

Nominations

- 1990 Helen Hayes Award Best Actress, Non-Resident Play (The Piano Lesson)
- 1990 Drama Desk Award Best Actress, Lead Role-Play (The Piano Lesson)
- 1990 Tony Nomination Best Actress, Featured Role-Play (The Piano Lesson)
- 1997 NAACP Image Award Outstanding Lead Actress in a Drama Series (Law & Order)
- 1998 NAACP Image Award Outstanding Lead Actress in a Drama Series (Law & Order)
- 1999 NAACP Image Award Outstanding Lead Actress in a Drama Series (Law & Order)
- 2001 NAACP Image Award Outstanding Lead Actress in a Drama Series (Law & Order)
- 2003 Lucille Lortel Award Outstanding Lead Actress (Fucking A)
- 2003 Drama League Award Distinguished Performance (Fucking A)
- 2005 Satellite Award Outstanding Actress in a Miniseries or a Motion Picture Made for Television (Lackawanna Blues)
- 2006 Vision Award Best Dramatic Performance (ackawanna Blues)
- 2006 Lucille Lortel Award Best Actress (Birdie Blue)
- 2006 Independent Spirit Nomination Best Female Lead (Lackawanna Blues)
- 2006 Drama League Award Distinguished Performance (Birdie Blue)
- 2007 NAACP Image Award Best Supporting Actress in a Drama Series (Law & Order)
- 2008 NAACP Image Award Best Supporting Actress in a Drama Series (Law & Order)
- 2008 NAACP Image Award Nomination Best Actress in a Made for TV Movie, Miniseries or Dramatic Special (Girl, Positive)
- 2008 Tony Award Nomination Best Performance by a Leading Actress in a Play (Come Back, Little Sheba)
- 2008 NAACP Theatre Award Best Lead Female – Equity (Come Back, Little Sheba)

== See also ==
- List of people from Harlem
