= Thaddeus Stevens =

American politician (1792–1868)

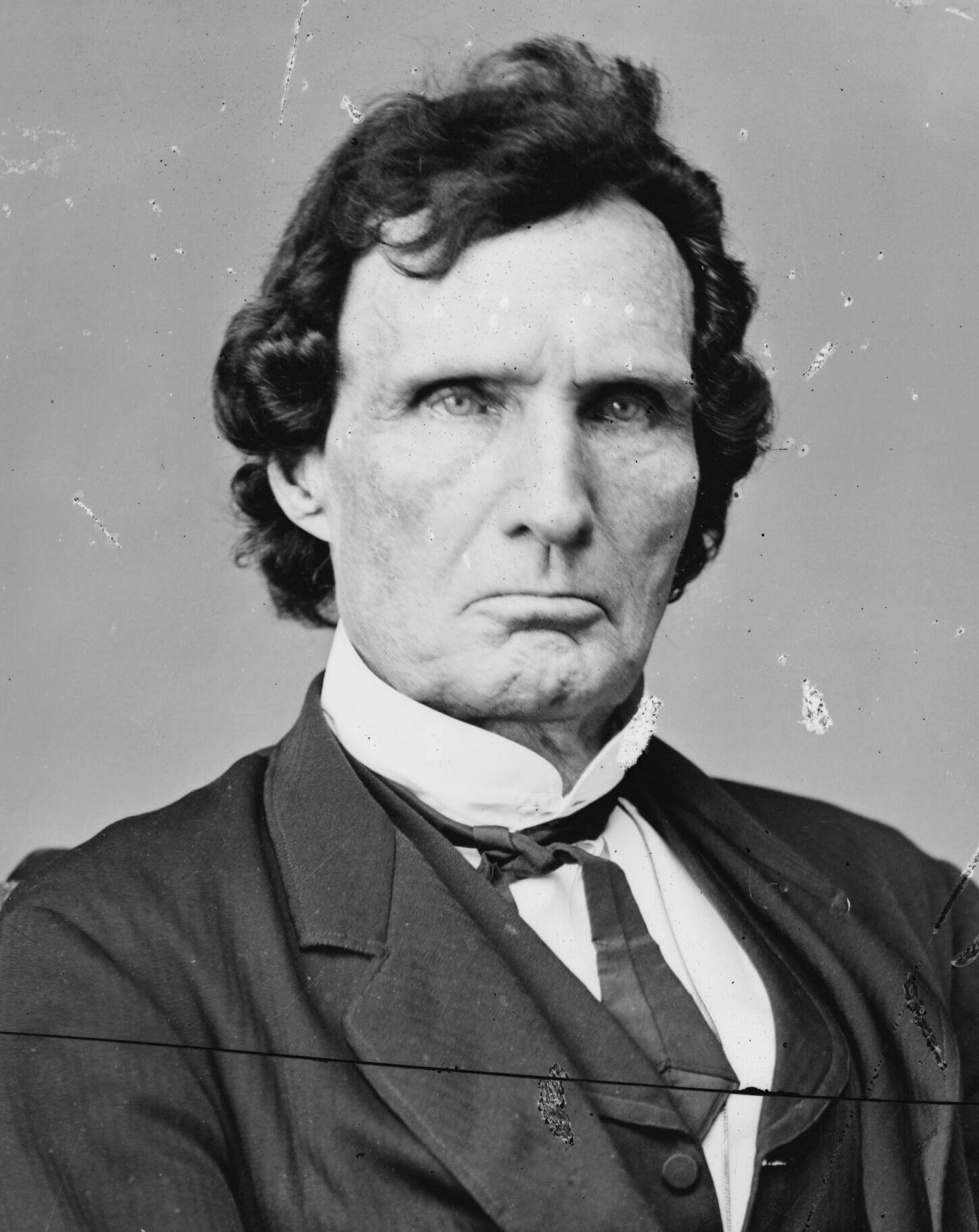
- Stevens, c. 1860–1868

Member of the U.S. House of Representatives from Pennsylvania
- In office March 4, 1859 – August 11, 1868
- Preceded by: Anthony Roberts
- Succeeded by: Oliver Dickey
- Constituency: 9th district
- In office March 4, 1849 – March 3, 1853
- Preceded by: John Strohm
- Succeeded by: Henry A. Muhlenberg
- Constituency: 8th district

Chair of the House Ways and Means Committee
- In office March 4, 1861 – March 3, 1865
- Preceded by: John Sherman
- Succeeded by: Justin Smith Morrill

Chair of the House Appropriations Committee
- In office December 11, 1865 – August 11, 1868
- Preceded by: Position established
- Succeeded by: Elihu B. Washburne

Personal details
- Born: April 4, 1792 Danville, Vermont, U.S.
- Died: August 11, 1868 (aged 76) Washington, D.C., U.S.
- Resting place: Shreiner-Concord Cemetery
- Party: Republican (from 1855)
- Other political affiliations: Anti-Masonic (1828–1838); Whig (1838–1853); Know Nothing (1853–1855)
- Domestic partner: Lydia Hamilton Smith (1848–1868)
- Education: University of Vermont; Dartmouth College (BA)
- Nickname(s): The Old Commoner; The Great Commoner

Thaddeus Stevens (April 4, 1792 – August 11, 1868) was an American politician and lawyer who served as a member of the United States House of Representatives from Pennsylvania, being one of the leaders of the Radical Republican faction of the Republican Party during the 1860s. A fierce opponent of slavery and discrimination against Black Americans, Stevens sought to secure their rights during Reconstruction, leading the opposition to U.S. President Andrew Johnson. As chairman of the House Ways and Means Committee during the American Civil War, he played a leading role, focusing his attention on defeating the Confederacy, financing the war with new taxes and borrowing, crushing the power of slave owners, ending slavery, and securing equal rights for the freedmen.

Stevens was born in rural Vermont, in poverty, and with a club foot, which left him with a permanent limp. He moved to Pennsylvania as a young man and quickly became a successful lawyer in Gettysburg. He interested himself in municipal affairs and then in politics. He was an active leader of the Anti-Masonic Party, as a fervent believer that Freemasonry in the United States was an evil conspiracy to secretly control the republican system of government. He was elected to the Pennsylvania House of Representatives, where he became a strong advocate of free public education. Financial setbacks in 1842 caused him to move his home and practice to the larger city of Lancaster. There, he joined the Whig Party and was elected to Congress in 1848. His activities as a lawyer and politician in opposition to slavery cost him votes, and he did not seek reelection in 1852. After a brief flirtation with the Know-Nothing Party, Stevens joined the newly formed Republican Party and was elected to Congress again in 1858. There, with fellow radicals such as Massachusetts Senator Charles Sumner, he opposed the expansion of slavery and concessions to the South as the war came.

Stevens argued that slavery should not survive the war and was frustrated by the slowness of U.S. President Abraham Lincoln to support his position. He guided the government's financial legislation through the House as Ways and Means chairman. As the war progressed towards a Northern victory, Stevens came to believe that not only should slavery be abolished, but that black Americans should be given a stake in the South's future through the confiscation of land from planters to be distributed to the freedmen. His plans went too far for the Moderate Republicans and were not enacted. After the assassination of Abraham Lincoln in April 1865, Stevens came into conflict with the new president, Johnson, who sought rapid restoration of the seceded states without guarantees for freedmen. The difference in views caused an ongoing battle between Johnson and Congress, with Stevens leading the Radical Republicans. After gains in the 1866 election, the radicals took control of Reconstruction away from Johnson. Stevens's last great battle was to secure in the House articles of impeachment against Johnson, acting as a House manager in the impeachment trial, though the Senate did not convict the president.

Historians' views of Stevens have dramatically shifted. During the early 20th century, he was viewed as reckless and motivated by hatred of the white South. Since the 1950s, neoabolitionists have lauded his commitment to equality.

== Early life and education ==
Stevens was born in Danville, Vermont, on April 4, 1792. He was the second of four children, all boys, and was named to honor the Polish general who served in the American Revolutionary War, Tadeusz "Thaddeus" Kościuszko. His parents were Baptists who had moved from Massachusetts around 1786. Thaddeus was born with a club foot, which was seen by some at the time as Divine judgment for secret parental sin. His older brother was born with the same condition in both feet. The boys' father, Joshua Stevens, was a farmer and cobbler who struggled to make a living in Vermont. After fathering two more sons (born without disabilities), Joshua abandoned the children and his wife Sarah (née Morrill). The circumstances of his departure and his subsequent fate are uncertain; he may have died at the Battle of Oswego during the War of 1812.

Sarah Stevens struggled, even with the increasing aid of her sons, to make a living from the farm. Determined that her sons improve themselves, in 1807 she moved the family to the neighboring town of Peacham, Vermont, where she enrolled young Thaddeus in the Caledonia Grammar School (often called the Peacham Academy). He suffered much from the taunts of his classmates for his disability. Later accounts describe him as "wilful, headstrong" with "an overwhelming burning desire to secure an education."

After graduation, he enrolled at the University of Vermont, but he suspended his studies because the federal government appropriated campus buildings during the War of 1812. Stevens then enrolled in the sophomore class at Dartmouth College. At Dartmouth, despite a stellar academic career, he was not elected to Phi Beta Kappa; this was reportedly a scarring experience for him.

Stevens graduated from Dartmouth in 1814 and spoke at the commencement ceremony. Afterward, he returned to Peacham, where he briefly taught. Stevens also began to read law in the office of John Mattocks. In early 1815, correspondence with a friend, Samuel Merrill, a fellow Vermonter who had moved to York, Pennsylvania to become preceptor of the York Academy, led to an offer to Stevens to join the academy faculty. He moved to York to teach and continued to study law in the offices of David Cossett.

== Pennsylvania attorney and politician ==
=== Gettysburg lawyer ===
In Pennsylvania, Stevens taught at York Academy and continued to study for the bar. Local lawyers passed a resolution barring from membership anyone who had "followed any other profession while preparing for admission," a restriction likely aimed at Stevens. Undaunted, he reportedly (according to a story he often retold) presented himself and four bottles of Madeira wine to the examining board in nearby Harford County, Maryland. Few questions were asked, but much wine was drunk. He left Bel Air the next morning with a certificate allowing him, through reciprocity, to practice law anywhere. Stevens then went to Gettysburg, the seat of Adams County, where he opened an office in September 1816.

Stevens knew no one in Gettysburg and initially had little success as a lawyer. His breakthrough, in mid-1817, was a case in which a farmer who had been jailed for debt later killed one of the constables who had arrested him. His defense, although unsuccessful, impressed the local people, and he never lacked for business thereafter. In his legal career, he demonstrated the propensity for sarcasm that would later mark him as a politician, once telling a judge who accused him of manifesting contempt of court, "Sir, I am doing my best to conceal it."

Many who memorialized Stevens after his death in 1868 agreed on his talent as a lawyer. He was involved in the first ten cases to reach the Supreme Court of Pennsylvania from Adams County after he began his practice, and he won nine. One case he apparently wished he had not won was Butler v. Delaplaine, in which he represented a slave owner in a lawsuit brought by a slave woman who claimed that she and her two daughters were legally entitled to their freedom, because their owner had leased her to a man who had taken her and her daughters into a free state. Hans L. Trefousse writes:

The Butler case may well have played an important role in Stevens's life. Up to that time, he had not taken a stand on the slavery question, and may not have felt strongly about it. He might not have taken the case had he had any compelling convictions about human bondage. But apparently he was not happy with the result of the trial, for shortly afterward, he denounced the "peculiar institution," and it is possible that remorse for his action was one of the motivations for his antislavery crusade....

In Gettysburg, Stevens also began his involvement in politics, serving six one-year terms on the borough council between 1822 and 1831 and becoming its president. He took the profits from his practice and invested them in Gettysburg real estate, becoming the largest landowner in the community by 1825, and had an interest in several iron furnaces outside town. In addition to assets, he acquired enemies; after the death of a pregnant black woman in Gettysburg, anonymous letters to newspapers hinted that Stevens was culpable. The rumors dogged him for years; when one newspaper opposed to Stevens printed a letter in 1831 naming him as the killer, he successfully sued for libel.

=== Anti-Masonry ===
Stevens's first political cause was Anti-Masonry, which became widespread in 1826 after the disappearance and death of William Morgan, a Mason in upstate New York; fellow Masons were presumed to have killed Morgan because they disapproved of his book revealing the order's secret rites. Since the leading candidate opposing President John Quincy Adams was General Andrew Jackson, a Mason who mocked opponents of the order, Anti-Masonry became closely associated with opposition to Jackson and his Jacksonian democracy policies once he was elected president in 1828.

Jackson's adherents were from the old Democratic–Republican Party and eventually became known as the Democrats. Stevens had been told by a fellow attorney (and future president) James Buchanan that he could advance politically if he joined them. However, Stevens could not support Jackson, out of principle. For Stevens, Anti-Masonry became one means of opposing Jackson; he may also have had personal reasons as the Masons barred "cripples" from joining. Stevens took to Anti-Masonry with enthusiasm and remained loyal to it after most Pennsylvanians had dropped the cause. His biographer, Hans Trefousse, suggested that another reason for Stevens's virulence was a disease in the late 1820s that cost him his hair (he thereafter wore wigs, often ill-fitting), and "the unwelcome illness may well have contributed to his unreasonable fanaticism concerning the Masons."

By 1829, Anti-Masonry had evolved into a political party, the Anti-Masonic Party, that proved popular in rural central Pennsylvania. Stevens quickly became prominent in the movement, attending the party's first two national conventions in 1830 and 1831. At the latter, he promoted the candidacy of Supreme Court Justice John McLean as the party's presidential candidate, but in vain, as the nomination fell to former Attorney General William Wirt. Jackson was easily reelected; the crushing defeat (Wirt won only Vermont) caused the party to disappear in most places, though it remained powerful in Pennsylvania for several years.

In September 1833, Stevens was elected to a one-year term in the Pennsylvania House of Representatives as an Anti-Mason. Once in the capital Harrisburg, he sought to have the body establish a committee to investigate Masonry. Stevens gained attention far beyond Pennsylvania for his oratory against Masonry and quickly became an expert in legislative maneuvers. In 1835, a split among the Democrats put the Anti-Masons in control of the Pennsylvania General Assembly, the legislature. Granted subpoena powers, Stevens summoned leading state politicians who were Masons, including Governor George Wolf. The witnesses invoked their Fifth Amendment right against self-incrimination, and when Stevens verbally abused one of them, it created a backlash that caused his own party to end the investigation. The fracas cost Stevens reelection in 1836, and the issue of Anti-Masonry died in Pennsylvania. Nevertheless, Stevens remained an opponent of the order for the rest of his life.

=== Crusader for education ===
Beginning with his early years in Gettysburg, Stevens advanced the cause of universal education. At the time, no state outside New England had free public education for all. In Pennsylvania, there was free education in Philadelphia, but elsewhere in the state, those wishing to have their children educated without paying tuition had to swear a pauper's oath. Stevens opened his extensive private library to the public and gave up his presidency of the borough council, believing his service on the school board more important. In 1825, he was elected by the voters of Adams County as a trustee of Gettysburg Academy. As the school was failing, Stevens got county voters to agree to pay its debt, allowing it to be sold as a Lutheran seminary. It was granted the right to award college degrees in 1831 as Pennsylvania College, and in 1921 became Gettysburg College. Stevens gave the school land upon which a building could be raised and served as a trustee for many years.

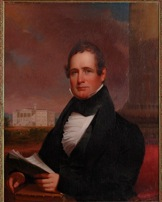
Portrait of Stevens by Jacob Eichholtz now owned by Gettysburg College

In April 1834, Stevens, working with Governor Wolf, guided an act through the legislature to allow districts across the state to vote on whether to have public schools and the taxes to pay for them. Gettysburg's district voted in favor and also elected Stevens as a school director, where he served until 1839. Tens of thousands of voters signed petitions urging a reversal. The result was a repeal bill that easily passed the Pennsylvania Senate. It was widely believed the bill would also pass the House and be enacted despite opposition by Stevens. When he rose to speak on April 11, 1835, he defended the new educational system, stating that it would actually save money, and demonstrated how. He stated that opponents were seeking to separate the poor into a lower caste than themselves and accused the rich of greed and failure to empathize with the poor. Stevens argued, "Build not your monuments of brass or marble, but make them of everliving mind!" The repeal bill was defeated; Stevens was given wide credit. Trefousse suggested that the victory was not due to Stevens's eloquence, but due to his influence, combined with that of Governor Wolf.

=== Political change; move to Lancaster ===
In 1838, Stevens ran again for the legislature. He hoped that if the remaining Anti-Masons and the emerging Whig Party gained a majority, he could be elected to the United States Senate, whose members until 1913 were chosen by state legislatures. A campaign, dirty even by the standards of the times, followed. The result was a Democrat elected as governor, Whig control of the state Senate, and the state House in dispute, with several seats from Philadelphia in question. Stevens won his seat in Adams County, and sought to have those Philadelphia Democrats excluded, which would create a Whig majority that could elect a Speaker and himself as a senator. Amid rioting in Harrisburg – later known as the "Buckshot War" – Stevens's ploy backfired, with the Democrats taking control of the House. Stevens remained in the legislature for most years through 1842 but the episode cost him much of his political influence. The Whigs blamed him for the debacle and were increasingly unwilling to give leadership to someone who had not yet joined their party. Nevertheless, he supported the pro-business and pro-development Whig stances. He campaigned for the Whig candidate in the 1840 presidential election, former general William Henry Harrison. Though Stevens later alleged that Harrison had promised him a Cabinet position if elected, he received none, and any influence ended when Harrison died after a month in office, to be succeeded by John Tyler, a southerner hostile to Stevens's stances on slavery.

Although Stevens was the most successful lawyer in Gettysburg, he had accrued debt due to his business interests. Refusing to take advantage of the bankruptcy laws, he felt he needed to move to a larger municipality to gain the money to pay his obligations. In 1842, Stevens moved his home and practice to Lancaster. He knew Lancaster County was an Anti-Mason and Whig stronghold, which ensured that he retained a political base. Within a short period, he was earning more than any other Lancaster attorney; by 1848, he had reduced his debts to $30,000 (~$901,958 in 2025) and paid them off soon after. It was in Lancaster that he engaged the services of Lydia Hamilton Smith, a housekeeper, whose racial makeup was described as mulatto, and who remained with him the rest of his life.

== Abolitionist and prewar congressman ==
=== Evolution of views ===
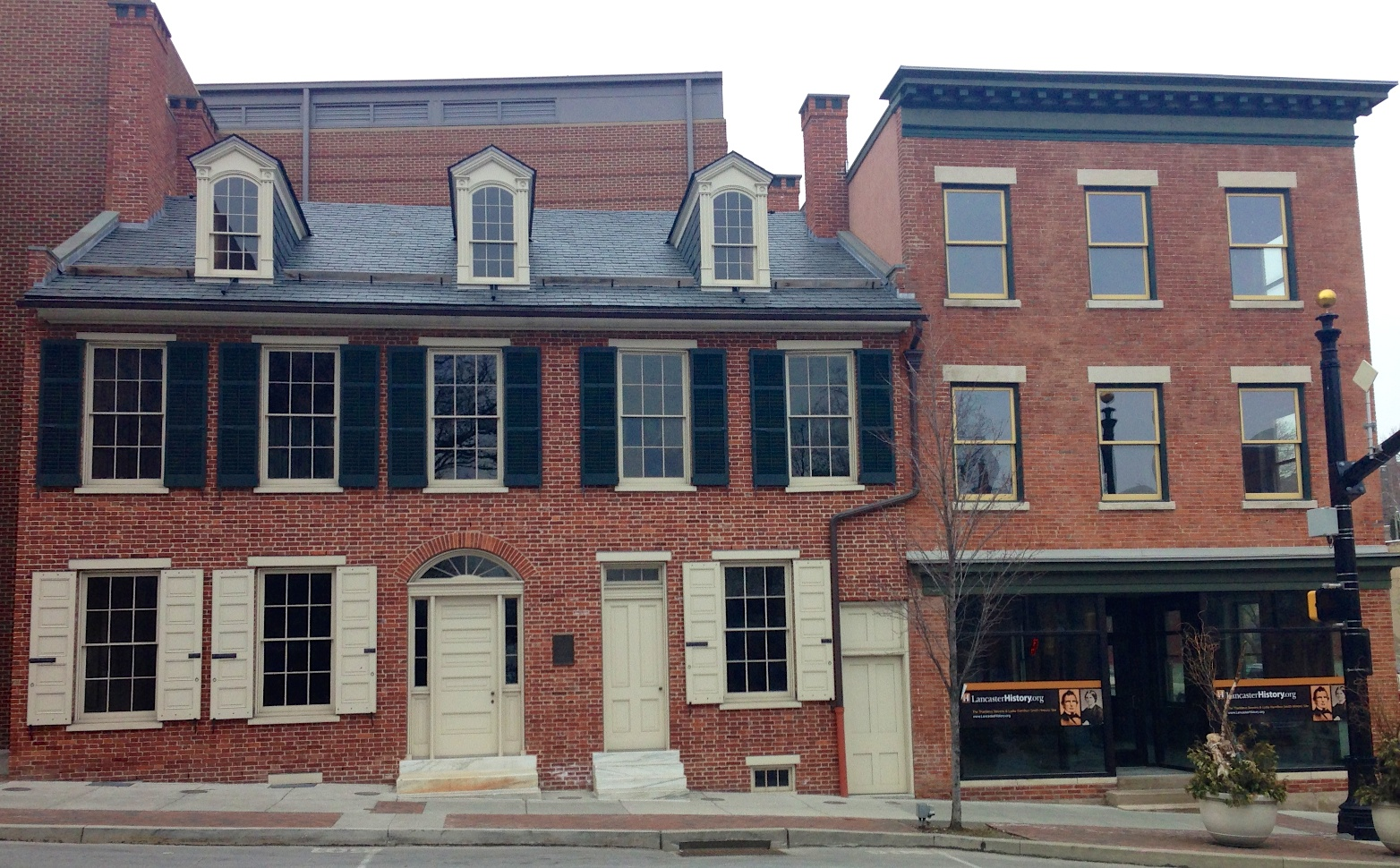
Stevens's home and law office on Queen Street, in Lancaster, Pennsylvania

In the 1830s, few sought the immediate eradication of slavery. The abolitionist movement was young and only recently had figures such as William Lloyd Garrison taken on the fight. Stevens's reason for adopting slavery as a cause has been disputed among his recent biographers. Richard N. Current, in 1942, suggested it was out of ambition; Fawn Brodie, in her controversial 1959 psychobiography of Stevens, suggested it was out of identification with the downtrodden, based on his handicap. Trefousse, in his 1997 work, also suggested that Stevens's feelings towards the downtrodden were a factor, combined with remorse over the Butler case, but that ambition was unlikely to have been a significant motivator, as Stevens's fervor in the anti-slavery cause inhibited his career.

At the 1837 Pennsylvania constitutional convention, Stevens, who was a delegate, fought against the disenfranchisement of African-Americans (see Black suffrage in Pennsylvania). According to historian Eric Foner, "When Stevens refused to sign the 1837 constitution because of its voting provision, he announced his commitment to a non-racial definition of American citizenship to which he would adhere for the remainder of his life." After he moved to Lancaster, a city not far from the Mason–Dixon line, he became active in the Underground Railroad, not only defending people believed to be fugitive slaves, but coordinating the movements of those seeking freedom. Stevens’s antislavery views were also reflected in The Caledonia State Furnace, where he employed African American workers and was connected to the nearby community of “Africa,” later known as Brownsville, a settlement of formerly enslaved people that developed alongside the iron works. The area became associated with Underground Railroad activity, as its location along South Mountain and the presence of a free Black community provided refuge for freedom seekers traveling through the region. Additionally, a 2003 renovation at his former home in Lancaster disclosed that there was a hidden cistern, attached to the main building by a concealed tunnel, in which escaped slaves hid.

Until the outbreak of the American Civil War, Stevens publicly supported slavery's end and opposed its expansion. Nevertheless, he would not seek to disturb it in the states where it existed, because the Constitution protected their internal affairs from federal interference. He also supported slave-owning Whig candidates for president: Henry Clay in 1844 and Zachary Taylor in 1848.

=== First tenure in Congress ===
In 1848, Stevens ran for election to Congress from Pennsylvania's 8th congressional district. There was opposition to him at the Whig convention. Some delegates felt that because Stevens had been late to join the party, he should not receive the nomination; others disliked his stance on slavery. He narrowly won the nomination. In a strong year for Whigs nationally, Taylor was chosen as president and Stevens was elected to Congress.

It is my purpose nowhere in these remarks to make personal reproaches; I entertain no ill-will toward any human being, nor any brute, that I know of, not even the [Democratic] skunk across the way to which I referred. Least of all would I reproach the South. I honor her courage and fidelity. Even in a bad, a wicked cause, she shows a united front. All her sons are faithful to the cause of human bondage, because it is their cause. But the North – the poor, timid, mercenary, driveling North – has no such united defenders of her cause, although it is the cause of human liberty ... She is offered up a sacrifice to propitiate southern tyranny – to conciliate southern treason.

— Stevens in the House debate over the
Fugitive Slave Act, June 10, 1850

When the 31st United States Congress convened in December 1849, Stevens took his seat, joining other newly elected slavery opponents such as Salmon P. Chase. Stevens spoke out against the Compromise of 1850, crafted by Kentucky Senator Henry Clay, that gave victories to both North and South, but would allow for some of the territories of the United States recently gained from Mexico to become slave states. As the debates continued, in June he said, "This word 'compromise' when applied to human rights and constitutional rights I abhor." Nevertheless, the pieces of legislation that made up the Compromise passed, including the Fugitive Slave Act of 1850, which Stevens found particularly offensive. Although many Americans hoped that the Compromise would bring sectional peace, Stevens warned that it would be "the fruitful mother of future rebellion, disunion, and civil war."

Stevens was easily renominated and reelected in 1850, even though his stance caused him problems among pro-Compromise Whigs. In 1851, Stevens was one of the defense lawyers in the trial of 38 African-Americans and three others in federal court in Philadelphia on treason charges. The defendants had been implicated in the so-called Christiana Riot: an attempt to enforce a Fugitive Slave Act warrant had resulted in the killing of the slaveowner. Justice Robert Grier of the U.S. Supreme Court, as circuit justice, tried the case, and instructed the jury to acquit because though the defendants might be guilty of murder or riot, they were not charged with that and were not guilty of treason. The well-publicized incident (and others like it) increased polarization over the issue of slavery, and made Stevens a prominent face of Northern abolitionism.

Despite this trend, Stevens suffered political problems. He left the Whig caucus in December 1851, when his colleagues would not join him in seeking the repeal of the offensive elements of the Compromise. Nevertheless, he supported its unsuccessful 1852 candidate for president, General Winfield Scott. His political opposition, and local dislike of his stance on slavery and participation in the treason trial, made him unlikely to win renomination, and he sought only to pick his successor. His choice was defeated for the Whig nomination.

=== Know-Nothing and Republican Parties ===
Out of office, Stevens concentrated on the practice of law in Lancaster, remaining one of the leading attorneys in the state. He stayed active in politics, and in 1854, to gain more votes for the anti-slavery movement, he joined the nativist Know Nothing Party. The members were pledged not to speak of party deliberations (thus, they knew nothing), and Stevens was attacked for his membership in a group with similar secrecy rules as the Masons. In 1855, Stevens joined the new Republican Party. Other former Whigs who were anti-slavery joined as well, including William H. Seward of New York, Charles Sumner of Massachusetts, and Abraham Lincoln of Illinois.

Stevens was a delegate to the 1856 Republican National Convention, where he supported Justice McLean, as he had in 1832. However, the convention nominated John C. Frémont, whom Stevens actively supported in the race against his fellow Lancastrian, the Democratic candidate James Buchanan. Nonetheless, Pennsylvania helped elect Buchanan. Stevens returned to the practice of law, but in 1858, with the President and his party unpopular and the nation torn by such controversies as the Dred Scott decision, Stevens saw an opportunity to return to Congress. As the Republican nominee, he was easily elected. Democratic papers were appalled. One banner headline read, "Niggerism Triumphant."

=== 1860 election; secession crisis ===
Stevens took his seat in the 36th United States Congress in December 1859, only days after the hanging of John Brown, who had attacked the federal arsenal at Harpers Ferry hoping to cause a slave insurrection. Stevens opposed Brown's violent actions at the time, though later, he was more approving. Sectional tensions spilled over into the House, which proved unable to elect a Speaker of the United States House for eight weeks. Stevens was active in the bitter flow of invective from both sides; at one point, Mississippi Congressman William Barksdale drew a knife on him, though no blood was spilled.

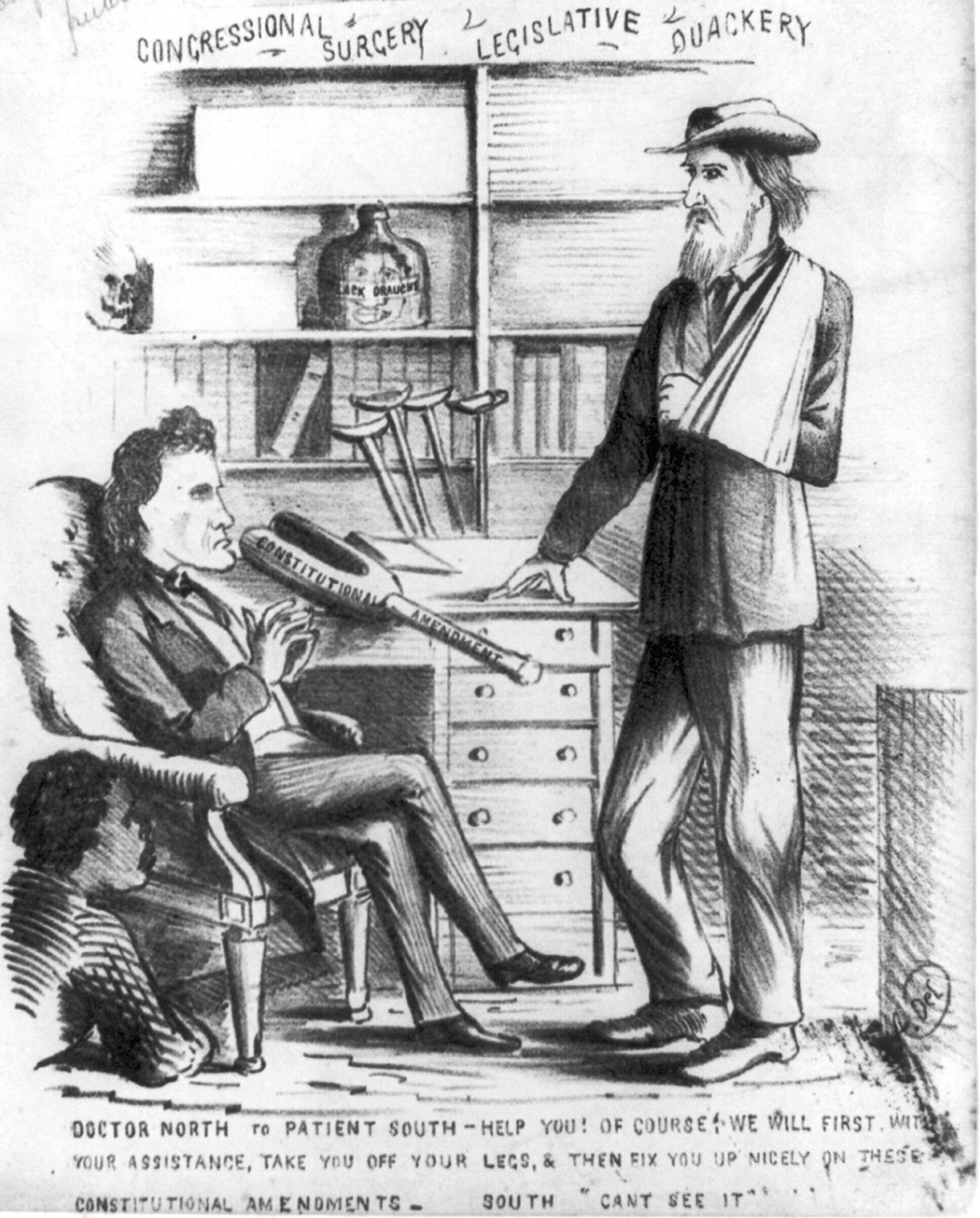
Southern view of the proposed compromises of 1860 and 1861, with "Dr. North" (Stevens) proposing to cut the South's legs off using a constitutional amendment. Stevens actually opposed such measures.

With the Democrats unable to agree on a single presidential candidate, the 1860 Republican National Convention in Chicago became crucial, as the nominee would be in a favorable position to become president. Prominent figures in the party, such as Seward and Lincoln, sought the nomination. Stevens continued to support the 75-year-old Justice McLean. Beginning on the second ballot, most Pennsylvania delegates supported Lincoln, helping to win him the nomination. As the Democrats put up no candidate in his district, Stevens was assured of reelection to the House and campaigned for Lincoln in Pennsylvania. Lincoln won a majority in the Electoral College. The President-elect's known opposition to the expansion of slavery caused immediate talk of secession in the southern states, a threat that Stevens had downplayed during the campaign.

Congress convened in December 1860, with several of the southern states already pledging to secede. Stevens was unyielding in opposing efforts to appease the southerners, such as the Crittenden Compromise, which would have enshrined slavery as beyond constitutional amendment. He stated, in a remark widely quoted both North and South, that rather than offer concessions because of Lincoln's election, he would see "this Government crumble into a thousand atoms," and that the forces of the United States would crush any rebellion. Despite Stevens's protests, the lame-duck Buchanan administration did little in response to the secession votes, allowing most federal resources in the South to fall into rebel hands. Even in the abolition movement, many were content to let it be so and let the South go its own way. Stevens disagreed, and the congressman was "undoubtedly pleased" by Lincoln's statement in his first inaugural address on March 4, 1861, that he would "hold, occupy and possess the property and places belonging to the Government."

== American Civil War ==
=== Slavery ===
When the war began in April 1861, Stevens argued that the Confederates were revolutionaries to be crushed by force. He also believed that the Confederacy had placed itself beyond the protection of the U.S. Constitution by making war, and that in a reconstituted United States, slavery should have no place. Speaker Galusha Grow, whose views placed him with Stevens among the members becoming known as the Radical Republicans (for their position on slavery, as opposed to the liberal or moderate Republicans), appointed him as chairman of the House Ways and Means Committee. This position gave him power over the House's agenda.

Abolition – Yes! abolish everything on the face of the earth, but this Union; free every slave – slay every traitor – burn every rebel mansion if these things are necessary to preserve this temple of freedom to the world and to our posterity.

— Stevens accepting renomination
for his congressional seat,
September 1, 1862

In July 1861, Stevens secured the passage of an act to confiscate the property, including slaves, of certain rebels. In November 1861, Stevens introduced a resolution to emancipate all slaves; it was defeated. However, legislation did pass that abolished slavery in the District of Columbia and in the territories. By March 1862, to Stevens's exasperation, the most Lincoln had publicly supported was gradual emancipation in the Border states, with the slave owners compensated by the federal government.

Stevens and other radicals were frustrated at how slow Lincoln was to adopt their policies for emancipation; according to Brodie, "Lincoln seldom succeeded in matching Stevens's pace, though both were marching towards the same bright horizon." In April 1862, Stevens wrote to a friend, "As for future hopes, they are poor as Lincoln is nobody." The radicals aggressively pushed the issue, provoking Lincoln to comment that Stevens, Sumner, and Massachusetts Senator Henry Wilson "simply haunt me with their importunities for a Proclamation of Emancipation. Wherever I go and whatever way I turn, they are on my trail; and still in my heart, I have the deep conviction that the hour [to issue one] has not yet come." The President stated that if it came to a showdown between the radicals and their enemies, he would have to side with Stevens and his fellows, and deemed them "the unhandiest devils in the world to deal with" but "with their faces ... set Zionwards." Although Lincoln composed his proclamation in June and July 1862, the secret was held within his Cabinet, and the President turned aside radical pleadings to issue one until after the Union victory at the Battle of Antietam in September. Stevens quickly adopted the Emancipation Proclamation for use in his successful re-election campaign. When Congress returned in December, Stevens maintained his criticism of Lincoln's policies, calling them "flagrant usurpations, deserving the condemnation of the community." Stevens generally opposed Lincoln's plans to colonize freed slaves abroad, though sometimes he supported emigration proposals for political reasons. Stevens wrote to a nephew in June 1863 saying, "The slaves ought to be incited to insurrection and give the rebels a taste of real civil war."

... the adoption of the measures I advocated at the outset of the war, the arming of the negroes, the slaves of the rebels, is the only way left on earth in which these rebels can be exterminated. They will find that they must treat those States now outside of the Union as conquered provinces and settle them with new men, and drive the present rebels as exiles from this country. ... They have such determination, energy, and endurance, that nothing but actual extermination or exile or starvation will ever induce them to surrender to this Government.

— Thaddeus Stevens, U.S. House of Representatives,
January 8, 1863

During the Confederate incursion into the North in mid-1863 that culminated in the Battle of Gettysburg, Confederates twice sent parties to Stevens's Caledonia Forge. Stevens, who had been there supervising operations, was hastened away by his workers against his will. General Jubal Early looted and vandalized the Forge, causing a loss to Stevens of about $80,000. Early said that the North had done the same to southern figures and that Stevens was well known for his vindictiveness towards the South. Asked if he would have taken the congressman to Libby Prison in Richmond, Early replied that he would have hanged Stevens and divided his bones among the Confederate states.

Stevens pushed Congress to pass a constitutional amendment abolishing slavery. The Emancipation Proclamation was a wartime measure, did not apply to all slaves, and might be reversed by peacetime courts; an amendment would be slavery's end. The Thirteenth Amendment, (Note: James Ashley introduced the amendment in December 1863. In March 1864, Stevens proposed a version that added "forever" to the conditional prohibition and explicitly annulled the Fugitive Slave Clause in Article 4, Section 2 of the U.S. Constitution. The version that passed had already been crafted by the Senate Judiciary Committee.) which outlawed slavery and involuntary servitude except as a punishment for crime, easily passed the Senate but, in June, it failed in the House, and fears that it might not pass delayed a renewed attempt there. Lincoln campaigned aggressively for the amendment after his re-election in 1864, and Stevens described his December annual message to Congress as "the most important and best message that has been communicated to Congress for the last 60 years". Stevens closed the debate on the amendment on January 13, 1865. Illinois Representative Isaac Arnold wrote: "distinguished soldiers and citizens filled every available seat, to hear the eloquent old man speak on a measure that was to consummate the warfare of forty years against slavery."

The amendment passed narrowly after heavy pressure exerted by Lincoln himself, along with offers of political appointments from the "Seward lobby". Democrats made allegations of bribery; Stevens stated: "the greatest measure of the nineteenth century was passed by corruption, aided and abetted by the purest man in America." The amendment was declared ratified on December 18, 1865. Stevens continued to push for a broad interpretation of it that included economic justice in addition to the formal end of slavery.

After passing the Thirteenth Amendment, Congress debated the economic rights of the freedmen. Urged on by Stevens, it voted to authorize the Bureau of Refugees, Freedmen, and Abandoned Lands, with a mandate (though no funding) to set up schools and to distribute "not more than forty acres" [16 ha] of confiscated Confederate land to each family of freed slaves.

=== Financing the war ===
Stevens worked closely with Lincoln administration officials on legislation to finance the war. Within a day of his appointment as Ways and Means chairman, he had reported a bill for a war loan. Legislation to pay the soldiers Lincoln had already called into service and to allow the administration to borrow to prosecute the war quickly followed. These acts and more were pushed through the House by Stevens. To defeat the delaying tactics of Copperhead opponents, he had the House set debate limits as short as half a minute.

Stevens played a major part in the passage of the Legal Tender Act of 1862 when for the first time, the United States issued currency backed only by its own credit, not by gold or silver. Early makeshifts to finance the war, such as war bonds, had failed as it became clear the war would not be short. In 1863, Stevens aided the passage of the National Banking Act, which required that banks limit their currency issues to the number of federal bonds that they were required to hold. The system endured for half a century until supplanted by the Federal Reserve System in 1913.

Although the Legal Tender legislation allowed for the payment of government obligations in paper money, Stevens was unable to get the Senate to agree that interest on the national debt should be paid with greenbacks. As the value of paper money dropped, Stevens railed against gold speculators, and in June 1864, after consultation with Treasury Secretary Salmon P. Chase, proposed what became known as the Gold Bill – to abolish the gold market by forbidding its sale by brokers or for future delivery. It passed Congress in June; the chaos caused by the lack of an organized gold market caused the value of paper to drop even faster. Under heavy pressure from the business community, Congress repealed the bill on July 1, twelve days after its passage. Stevens was unrepentant even as the value of paper currency recovered in late 1864 amid the expectation of Union victory, proposing legislation to make paying a premium in greenbacks for an amount in gold coin a criminal offense. It did not pass.

Like most Pennsylvania politicians of both parties, Stevens was a major proponent of tariffs, which increased from 19% to 48% from fiscal 1861 to fiscal 1865. According to activist Ida Tarbell in "The Tariff in Our Times:" [Import] duties were never too high for [Stevens], particularly for iron, for he was a manufacturer and it was often said in Pennsylvania that the duties he advocated in no way represented the large iron interests of the state, but were hoisted to cover the needs of his own ... badly managed works."

== Reconstruction ==
=== Problem of reconstructing the South ===
As Congress debated how the U.S. would be organized after the war, the status of freed slaves and former Confederates remained undetermined. Stevens stated that what was needed was a "radical reorganization of southern institutions, habits, and manners." Stevens, Sumner, and other radicals argued that the southern states should be treated like conquered provinces without constitutional rights. Lincoln, on the contrary, said that only individuals, not states, had rebelled. In July 1864, Stevens pushed Lincoln to sign the Wade–Davis Bill, which required at least half of prewar voters to sign an oath of loyalty for a state to gain readmission. Lincoln, who advocated his more lenient ten percent plan, pocket vetoed it.

Stevens reluctantly voted for Lincoln at the convention of the National Union Party, a coalition of Republicans and War Democrats. He would have preferred to vote for the sitting vice president, Hannibal Hamlin, as Lincoln's running mate in 1864. However, his delegation voted to cast the state's ballots for the administration's favored candidate, Military Governor of Tennessee Andrew Johnson, a War Democrat who had been a Tennessee senator and elected governor. Stevens was disgusted at Johnson's nomination, complaining, "can't you get a candidate for Vice-President without going down into a damned rebel province for one?" Stevens campaigned for the Lincoln–Johnson ticket; it was elected, as was Stevens for another term in the House. When in January 1865 Congress learned that Lincoln had attempted peace talks with Confederate leaders, an outraged Stevens declared that if the American electorate could vote again, they would elect General Benjamin Butler instead of Lincoln.

=== Presidential Reconstruction ===
Before leaving town after Congress adjourned in March 1865, Stevens privately urged Lincoln to press the South hard militarily, though the war was ending. Lincoln replied, "Stevens, this is a pretty big hog we are trying to catch and to hold when we catch him. We must take care that he does not slip away from us." Never to see Lincoln again, Stevens left with "a homely metaphor but no real certainty of having left as much as a thumbprint on Lincoln's policy." On the evening of April 14, 1865, Lincoln was assassinated by Confederate sympathizer John Wilkes Booth. Stevens did not attend the ceremonies when Lincoln's funeral train stopped in Lancaster; he was said to be ill. Trefousse speculated that he had avoided the rites for other reasons. According to Lincoln biographer Carl Sandburg, Stevens stood at a railroad bridge and lifted his hat.

In May 1865, Andrew Johnson began what came to be known as "Presidential Reconstruction": recognizing a provisional government of Virginia led by Francis Harrison Pierpont, calling for other former rebel states to organize constitutional conventions, declaring amnesty for many southerners, and issuing individual pardons to even more. Johnson did not push the states to protect the rights of freed slaves, and immediately began to counteract the land reform policies of the Freedmen's Bureau. These actions outraged Stevens and others who took his view. The radicals saw that freedmen in the South risked losing the economic and political liberty necessary to sustain emancipation from slavery. They began to call for universal male suffrage and continued their demands for land reform.

Stevens wrote to Johnson that his policies were gravely damaging the country and that he should call a special session of Congress, which was not scheduled to meet until December. When his communications were ignored, Stevens began to discuss with other radicals how to prevail over Johnson when the two houses convened. Congress has the constitutional power to judge whether those seeking to be its members are properly elected; Stevens urged that no senators or representatives from the South be seated. He argued that the states should not be readmitted as thereafter Congress would lack the power to force race reform.

In September, Stevens gave a widely reprinted speech in Lancaster in which he set forth what he wanted for the South. He proposed that the government confiscate the estates of the largest 70,000 landholders there, those who owned more than 200 acres (81 ha). Much of this property he wanted distributed in plots of 40 acres (16 ha) to the freedmen; other lands would go to reward loyalists both North and South, or to meet government obligations. He warned that under the President's plan, the southern states would send rebels to Congress who would join with northern Democrats and Johnson to govern the nation and perhaps undo emancipation.

Through late 1865, the southern states held white-only balloting and, in congressional elections, chose many former rebels, most prominently Confederate Vice President Alexander Stephens, voted as senator by the Georgia Legislature. Violence against African-Americans was common and unpunished in the South; the new legislatures enacted Black Codes, depriving the freedmen of most civil rights. These actions, seen as provocative in the North, both privately dismayed Johnson and helped turn northern public opinion against the president. Stevens proclaimed that "This is not a 'white man's Government'! ... To say so is political blasphemy, for it violates the fundamental principles of our gospel of liberty."

=== Congressional Reconstruction ===
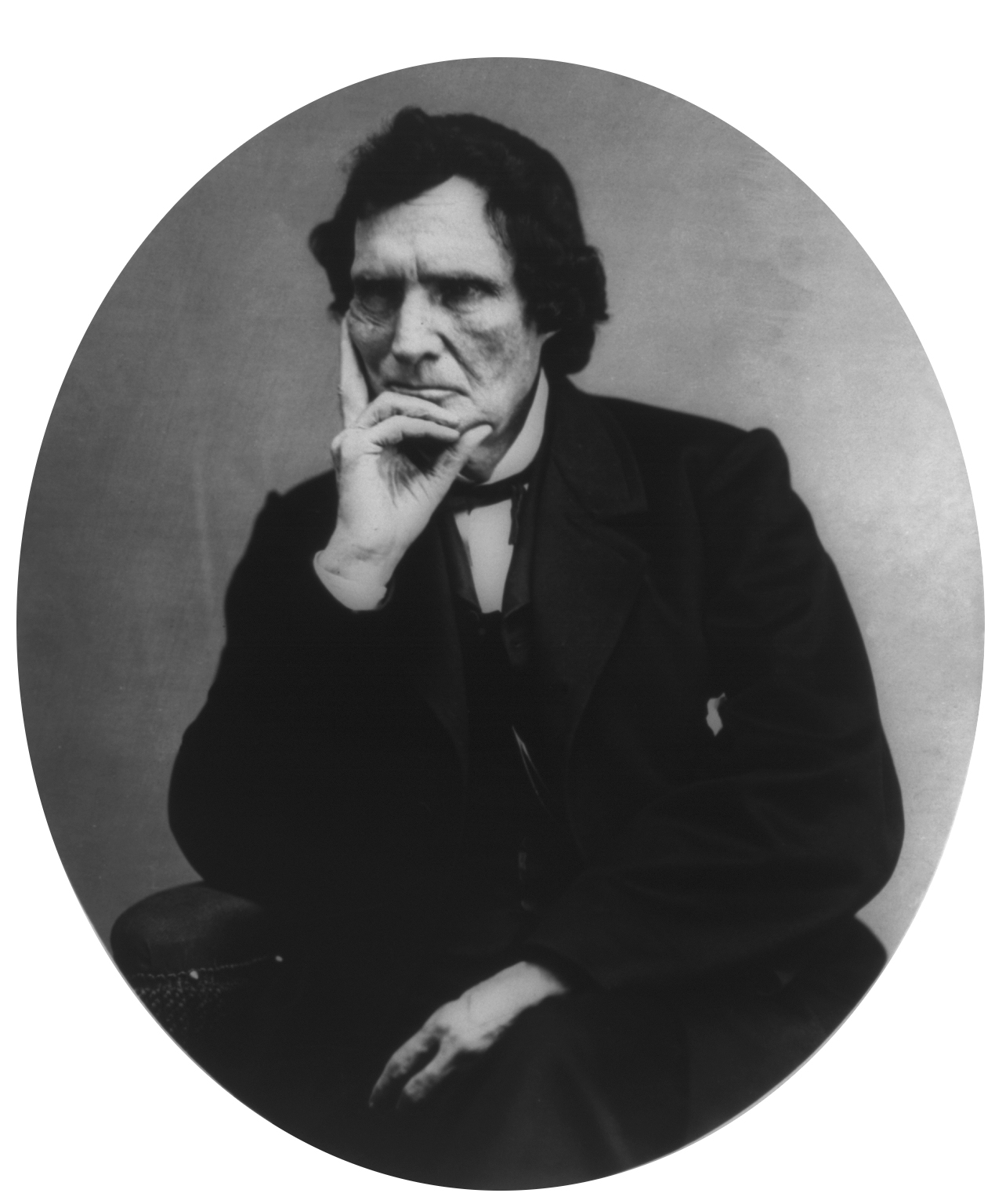
Stevens in a thoughtful pose

By this time, Stevens was past age seventy and in poor health; he was carried everywhere in a special chair. When Congress convened in early December 1865, Stevens made arrangements with the Clerk of the House that when the roll was called, the names of the Southern electees be omitted. The Senate also excluded Southern claimants. A new congressman, Ohio's Rutherford B. Hayes, described Stevens: "He is radical throughout, except, I am told, he don't believe in hanging. He is [a] leader."

As the responsibilities of the Ways and Means chairman had been divided, Stevens took the post of Chairman of the House Committee on Appropriations, retaining control over the House's agenda. Stevens focused on legislation that would secure the freedom promised by the newly ratified Thirteenth Amendment. He proposed and then co-chaired the Joint Committee on Reconstruction with Maine Senator William Pitt Fessenden. This body, also called the Committee of Fifteen, investigated conditions in the South. It heard not only of the violence against African-Americans but against Union loyalists and against what southerners termed "carpetbaggers": Northerners who had journeyed south after the restoration of peace. Stevens declared that "our loyal brethren at the South, whether they be black or white," required urgent protection "from the barbarians who are now daily murdering them".

The Committee of Fifteen began to consider what would become the Fourteenth Amendment. Stevens had begun drafting versions in December 1865, before the Committee had even formed. In January 1866, a subcommittee including Stevens and John Bingham proposed two amendments: one giving Congress the unqualified power to secure equal rights, privileges, and protections for all citizens; the other explicitly annulling all racially discriminatory laws. Stevens believed that the Declaration of Independence and Organic Acts already bound the federal government to these principles, but that an amendment was necessary to allow enforcement against discrimination at the state level. The resolution providing for what would become the Fourteenth Amendment was watered down in Congress; during the closing debate, Stevens said these changes had shattered his lifelong dream in equality for all Americans. Nevertheless, stating that he lived among men, not angels, he supported the passage of the compromise amendment. Still, Stevens told the House: "Forty acres of land and a hut would be more valuable to [the African-American] than the immediate right to vote."

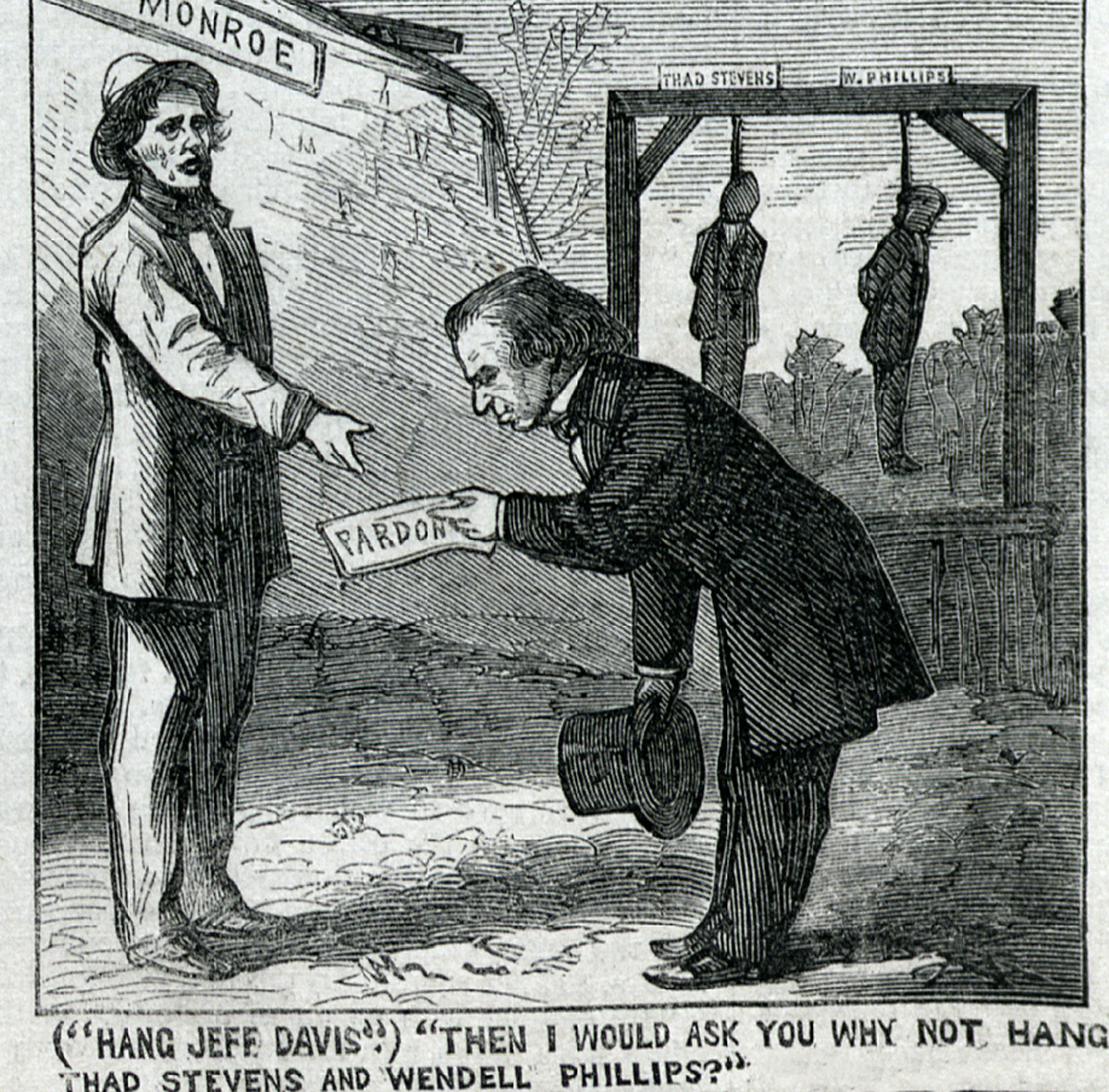
Based on ill-considered exchanges between Johnson and hecklers during the Swing Around the Circle, this excerpt from the Thomas Nast cartoon Andy's Trip shows Johnson delivering a pardon to Davis as Stevens and Wendell Phillips hang in the background.

When Illinois Senator Lyman Trumbull introduced legislation to reauthorize and expand the Freedmen's Bureau, Stevens called the bill a "robbery" because it did not include sufficient provisions for land reform or protect the property of refugees given them by the military occupation of the South. Johnson vetoed the bill anyway, calling the Freedmen's Bureau unconstitutional, and decrying its cost: Congress had never purchased land, established schools, or provided financial help for "our own people." Congress was unable to override Johnson's veto in February, but five months later passed a similar bill. Stevens criticized the passage of the Southern Homestead Act of 1866, arguing that the low-quality land it made available would not drive real economic growth for black families.

Congress overrode a Johnson veto to pass the Civil Rights Act of 1866 (also introduced by Trumbull), granting African-Americans citizenship and equality before the law and forbidding any action by a state to the contrary. Johnson made the gap between him and Congress wider when he accused Stevens, Sumner, and Wendell Phillips of trying to destroy the government.

After Congress adjourned in July, the campaigning for the fall elections began. Johnson embarked on a trip by rail, dubbed the "Swing Around the Circle" that won him few supporters; his arguments with hecklers were deemed undignified. He attacked Stevens and other radicals during this tour. Stevens campaigned for firm measures against the South, his hand strengthened by violence in Memphis and New Orleans, where African-Americans and white Unionists had been attacked by mobs, including the police. Stevens was returned to Congress by his constituents; Republicans would have a two-thirds majority in both houses in the next Congress.

=== Radical Reconstruction ===
In January 1867, Stevens introduced legislation to divide the South into five districts, each commanded by an army general empowered to override civil authorities. These military officers were to supervise elections with all males of whatever race, entitled to vote, except for those who could not take an oath of past loyalty – most white Southerners could not. The states were to write new constitutions (subject to approval by Congress) and hold elections for state officials. Only if a state ratified the Fourteenth Amendment would its delegation be seated in Congress. The system gave power to a Republican coalition of freedmen (mobilized by the Union League), carpetbaggers, and co-operative Southerners (the last dubbed scalawags by indignant ex-rebels) in most southern states. These states ratified the Fourteenth Amendment, which became part of the Constitution in mid-1868.

Stevens introduced a Tenure of Office Act, restricting Johnson from firing officials who had received Senate confirmation without getting that body's consent. The Tenure of Office Act was ambiguous since it could be read to protect officeholders only during the tenure of the president who appointed them, and most of the officials the radicals sought to protect had been named by Lincoln. Chief among these was Secretary of War Edwin Stanton, a radical himself.

Stevens steered a bill to enfranchise African-Americans in the District of Columbia through the House. The Senate passed it in 1867, and it was enacted over Johnson's veto. Congress was downsizing the Army for peacetime; Stevens offered an amendment, which became part of the bill as enacted, to have two regiments of African-American cavalry. His solicitude for African-Americans extended to the Native American; Stevens was successful in defeating a bill to place reservations under state law, noting that the native people had often been abused by the states. An expansionist, he supported the railroads. He added a stipulation into the [Transcontinental] Pacific Railroad Act requiring the applicable railroads to buy iron "of American manufacture" of the top price qualities. Although he sought to protect manufacturers with high tariffs, he also sought unsuccessfully to get a bill passed to protect labor with an eight-hour day in the District of Columbia. Stevens advocated a bill to give government workers raises; it did not pass.

== Impeaching President Johnson ==
With Stevens's agreement, James Mitchell Ashley introduced a resolution on January 7, 1867, for a Judiciary Committee-run inquiry on impeachment, which passed the House. The 40th Congress, which convened on March 4, 1867, proved to be less aggressive in opposing Johnson than Stevens had hoped. It soon adjourned until July, though the Judiciary Committee remained to hold hearings on impeachment. Stevens (who believed that impeachment was a "purely political proceeding intended as a remedy for malfeasance in office and to prevent continuance thereof") firmly supported impeachment, but others were less enthusiastic once the Senate elected Ohio's Benjamin Wade as its president pro tempore, next in line to the presidency in the absence of a vice president. Wade was a radical who supported wealth redistribution; a speech of his in Kansas so impressed Karl Marx that he mentioned it in the first German edition of Das Kapital. Also a supporter of women's suffrage, Wade was widely mistrusted for his views; the prospect of his succession made some advocates of Johnson's removal more hesitant. Stevens, though, strongly supported the removal of the president, and when the Judiciary Committee failed to report, tried to keep Congress in session until it did. Despite his opposition to its leader, Stevens worked with the administration on matters both supported; he obtained an appropriation for the purchase of Alaska and urged Secretary of State Seward to seek other territories into which to expand .

Most of Johnson's Cabinet supported him, but Secretary of War Stanton did not, and with the General of the Army, war hero Ulysses S. Grant, worked to undermine Johnson's Reconstruction policies. Johnson obeyed the laws that Congress had passed, sometimes over his veto, but often interpreted them in ways contrary to their intent. After Stanton refused Johnson's request that he resign in August 1867, Johnson suspended Stanton, as permitted by the Tenure of Office Act, and made General Grant interim Secretary of War. Republicans campaigned in that year's election on the issue of African-American suffrage, but were met with a voter surge towards the Democrats, who opposed it. Although no seats at Congress were directly at stake, voters in Ohio both defeated a referendum on black suffrage and elected the Democrats to the majority in the legislature, meaning that Wade, whose term was due to expire in 1869, would not be reelected.

When Congress met again, on December 7, 1867 Stevens voted for an impeachment resolution that was heavily defeated, though the Judiciary Committee had voted 5–4 for impeachment.

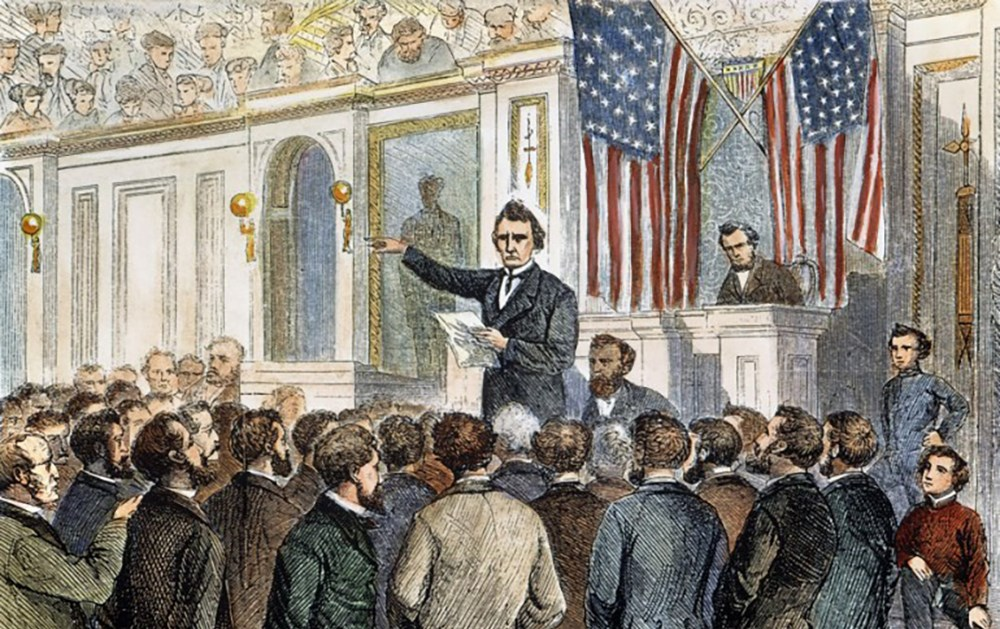
Color print of a Harper's Weekly woodcut by Theodore R. Davis depicting Stevens making his final argument to the House during March 2, 1868, debate on the articles of impeachment

Stevens was chairman of the House Select Committee on Reconstruction, which was tasked by the House on January 27, 1868, with running a second impeachment inquiry. Only four of the nine members (three Republicans and a Democrat) had supported impeachment in December 1867. On February 13, 1868, Stevens presented to the committee a report accusing Johnson of actions that intended to violate the Tenure of Office Act. The committee tabled it by a 5–4 vote.

The prospects of impeachment took new life on February 21, 1868. The Senate had previously, on January 13, 1868, overturned Johnson's suspension of Stanton. Grant then resigned as Secretary of War, and Stanton reclaimed his place. However, on February 21, the president ousted Stanton from his position, appointing General Lorenzo Thomas in his place – though Stanton barricaded himself in his office. These actions caused great excitement in Washington, and in the House of Representatives, Stevens went from group to group on the floor, repeating, "Didn't I tell you so? What good did your moderation do you? If you don't kill the beast, it will kill you." On February 22, Stevens reported from the Select Committee on Reconstruction a resolution and a report opining that Johnson should be impeached for high crimes and misdemeanors. Stevens concluded the debate on the impeachment resolution on February 24, though due to his poor health, he could not complete his speech and gave it to the Clerk to read aloud. In the speech, he accused Johnson of usurping the powers of other branches of government and ignoring the people's will. He did not deny impeachment was a political matter, but "this is not to be the temporary triumph of a political party, but is to endure in its consequence until the whole continent shall be filled with a free and untrammeled people or shall be a nest of shrinking, cowardly slaves." The House voted 126–47 to impeach the president.

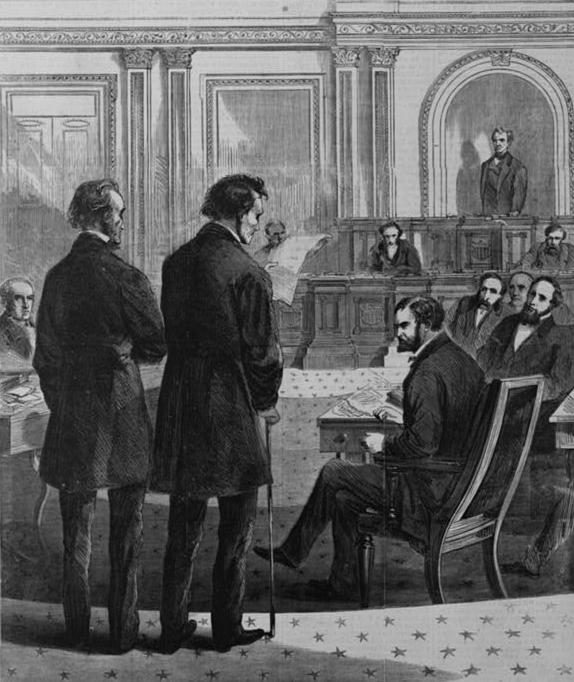
Illustration from Harper's Weekly of Stevens (right) and John A. Bingham formally notifying the Senate of Johnson's impeachment

Stevens led the delegation of House members sent the following day to inform the Senate of the impeachment, though he had to be carried to its doors by his bearers. Elected to the committee charged with drafting articles of impeachment, his illness limited his involvement. Nevertheless, dissatisfied with the committee's proposed articles, Stevens suggested another that would become Article XI. This grounded the various accusations in statements Johnson had made denying the legitimacy of Congress due to the exclusion of the southern states and stated that Johnson had tried to disobey the Reconstruction Acts. Stevens also urged Benjamin Butler to, independent of the committee, write his own impeachment article, which would ultimately be adopted as Article X.

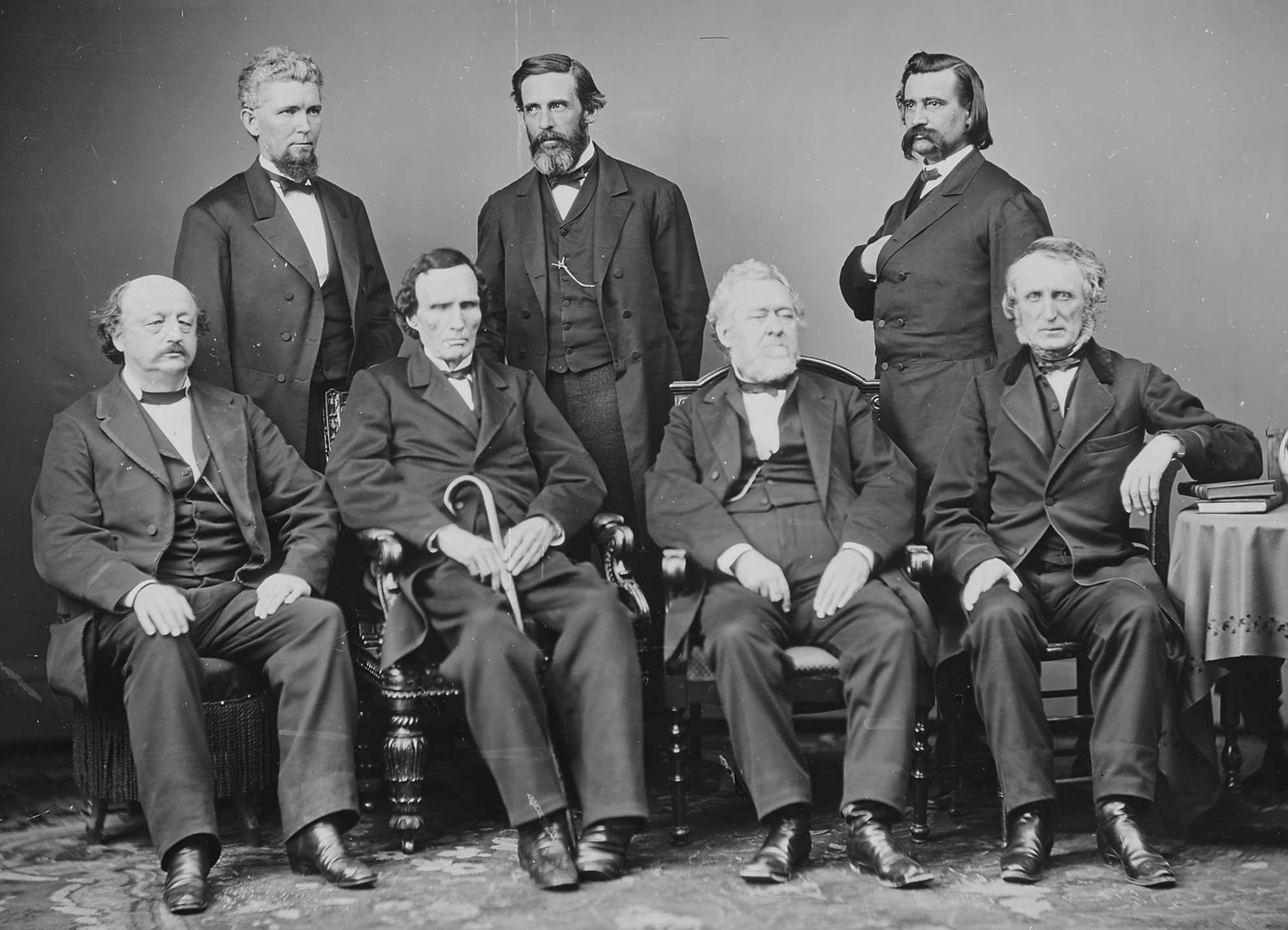
Johnson impeachment managers Seated L-R: Benjamin Butler, Stevens, Thomas Williams, John Bingham; Standing L-R: James F. Wilson, George S. Boutwell, John A. Logan

Stevens was one of the House impeachment managers (prosecutors) elected by the House to present its case in the impeachment trial. Although Stevens was too ill to appear in the Senate on March 3, when the managers requested that Johnson be summoned (the president would appear only by his counsel or defense managers), he was there ten days later when the summons was returnable. The New York Herald described him as having a "face of corpselike color, and rigidly twitching lips ... a strange and unearthly apparition – a reclused remonstrance from the tomb ... the very embodiment of fanaticism, without a solitary leaven of justice or mercy ... the avenging Nemesis of his party – the sworn and implacable foe of the Executive of the nation."

Increasingly ill, Stevens took little part in the impeachment trial, at which the leading House manager was Massachusetts Representative Benjamin F. Butler. Stevens nourished himself on the Senate floor with raw eggs and terrapin, port and brandy. He spoke only twice before making a closing argument for the House managers on April 27. As he spoke, his voice weakened, and finally, he allowed Butler to read the second half of his speech for him. Stevens focused on Article XI, taking the position that Johnson could be removed for political crimes; he need not have committed an offense against the law. The president, having sworn to faithfully execute the laws, had intentionally disobeyed the Tenure of Office Act after the Senate had refused to uphold his removal of Stanton, "and now this offspring of assassination turns upon the Senate who have ... rebuked him in a constitutional manner and bids them defiance. How can he escape the just vengeance of the law?"

Most radicals were confident that Johnson would be convicted and removed from office. Stevens, though, was never certain of the result as Chief Justice Chase (the former Treasury Secretary) made rulings that favored the defense, and he had no great confidence Republicans would stick together. On May 11, the Senate met in secret session, and senators gave speeches explaining how they intended to vote. All Democrats were opposed, but an unexpectedly large number of Republicans also favored acquittal on some or all of the articles. Counting votes, managers realized their best chance of gaining the required two-thirds for conviction was on the Stevens-inspired Article XI, and when the Senate assembled to give its verdict, they scheduled it to be voted upon first. The suspense was broken when Kansas Senator Edmund Ross, whose position was uncertain, voted for acquittal. This meant that, with the votes of those who remained, the president would not be convicted on that article. The article failed, 35 in favor to 19 opposed. In the hope that delay would bring a different result, Republicans adjourned the Senate for ten days. Stevens was carried from the Senate in his chair – one observer described him as "black with rage and disappointment" – and when those outside clamored for the result, Stevens shouted, "The country is going to the devil!"

== Final months and death ==
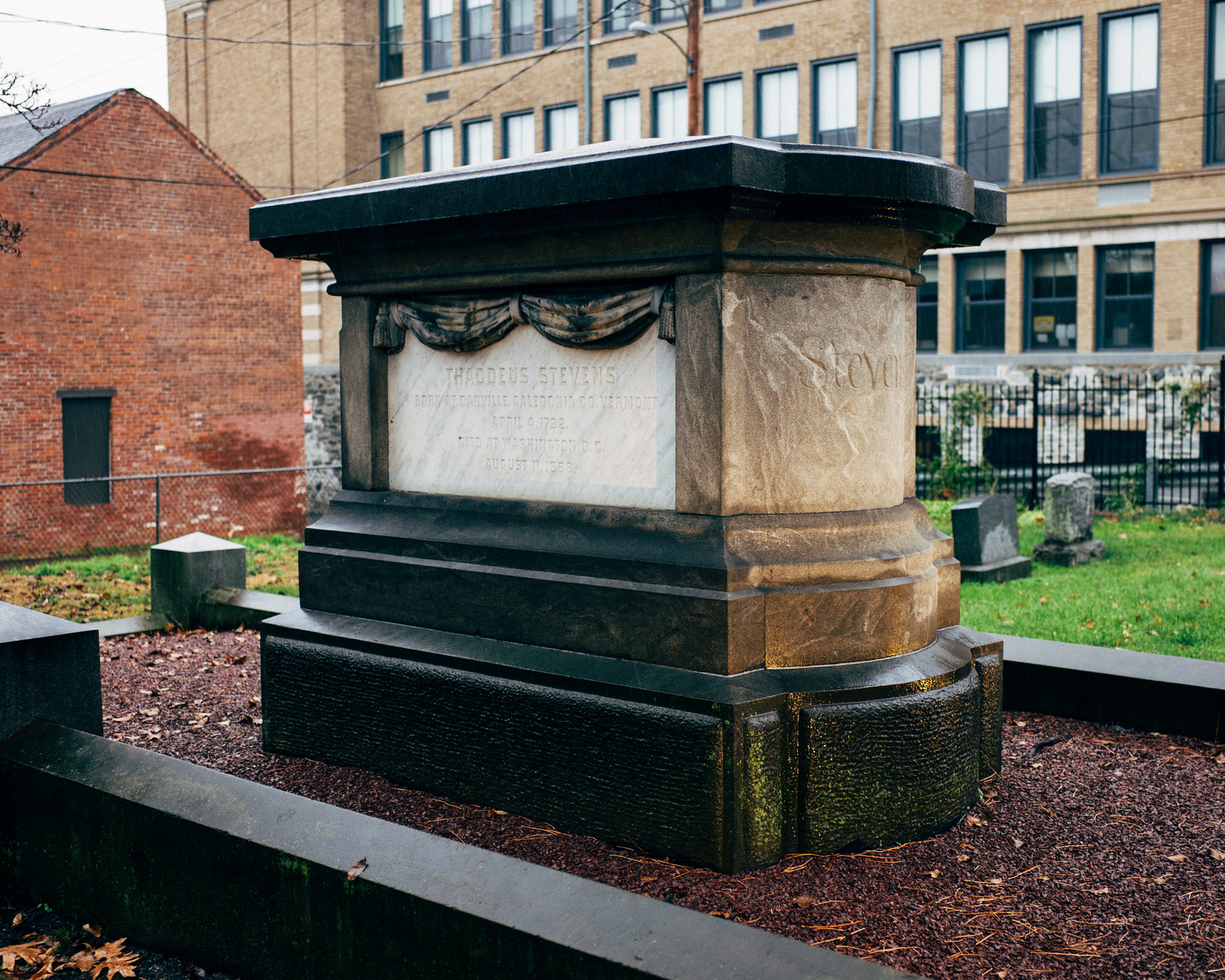
Stevens's grave in Lancaster

During the recess of the impeachment court, the Republicans met in convention in Chicago and nominated Grant for president. Stevens did not attend and was dismayed by the exclusion of African-American suffrage from the party platform as radical influence began to fade in the Republican Party. When the Senate returned to session, it voted down Articles II and III by the same 35–19 margin as before, and Chase declared the President acquitted. Stevens did not give up on the idea of removing Johnson; in July, he proffered several more impeachment articles (the House refused to adopt them). He offered a bill to divide Texas into several parts to gain additional Republican senators to vote out Johnson. It was defeated; the Herald stated, "It is lamentable to see this old man, with one foot in the grave, pursuing the President with such vindictiveness." Nevertheless, Stevens planned to revisit the question of impeachment when Congress met again in late 1868.

Brodie suggested that Stevens's hatred of Johnson was the only thing keeping him from despair, aware as he was of the continued violence in the South, some of which was committed by the Ku Klux Klan. Several of the southern states had been re-admitted by this time. The murders and intimidation were aiding the Democrats there in restoring white rule. With the Republicans unwilling to embrace black suffrage in their platform and the Democrats opposed to it, Stevens feared Democratic victory in the 1868 elections might even bring back slavery. He told his fellow Pennsylvania politician, Alexander McClure, "My life has been a failure. With all this great struggle of years in Washington and the fearful sacrifice of life and treasure, I see little hope for the Republic." Stevens took pride in his role in establishing free public education in Pennsylvania. When interviewed by a reporter seeking to gain his life story, Stevens replied, "I have no history. My life-long regret is that I have lived so long and so uselessly." Nevertheless, in his last formal speech to the House, Stevens stated that "man still is vile. But such large steps have lately been taken in the true direction, that the patriot has a right to take courage."

I repose in this quiet and secluded spot
Not from any natural preference for solitude
But, finding other Cemeteries limited as to Race
by Charter Rules
I have chosen this that I might illustrate
in my death
The Principles which I advocated
through a long life;
EQUALITY OF MAN BEFORE HIS CREATOR

— The inscription on Stevens's grave

When Congress adjourned in late July, Stevens remained in Washington, too ill to return to Pennsylvania. Stevens was in pain from his stomach ailments, from swollen feet, and from dropsy. By early August, he was unable to leave the house. He still received some visitors, though, and correctly predicted to his friend and former student Simon Stevens (no relation) that Grant would win the election. On the afternoon of August 11, his doctor warned that he would probably not last through the night. His longtime housekeeper and companion, Lydia Hamilton Smith, his nephew Thaddeus, and friends gathered by him. Two black preachers came to pray by him, telling him that he had the prayers of all their people. He sucked on ice to try to soothe the pain; his last words were a request for more of it. Thaddeus Stevens died on the night of August 11, 1868.

President Johnson issued no statement upon the death of his enemy. Newspaper reaction was generally along partisan lines, though sometimes mixed. The Detroit Post stated that "if to die crowned with noble laurels, and ... secure of [recte in] the respect of the world ... is an end worthy the ambition of a well spent life, then the veteran Radical may lie down with the noblest of the fathers to a well contented sleep." The New York Times stated that Stevens had "discerned the expediency of emancipation, and urged it long before Mr. Lincoln issued his proclamation" but that after the war, "on the subject of Reconstruction, then, Mr. Stevens must be deemed the Evil Genius of the Republican Party. The [Franklin, Louisiana] Planter's Banner exulted, "The prayers of the righteous have at last removed the Congressional curse! May ... the fires of his new furnace never go out!"

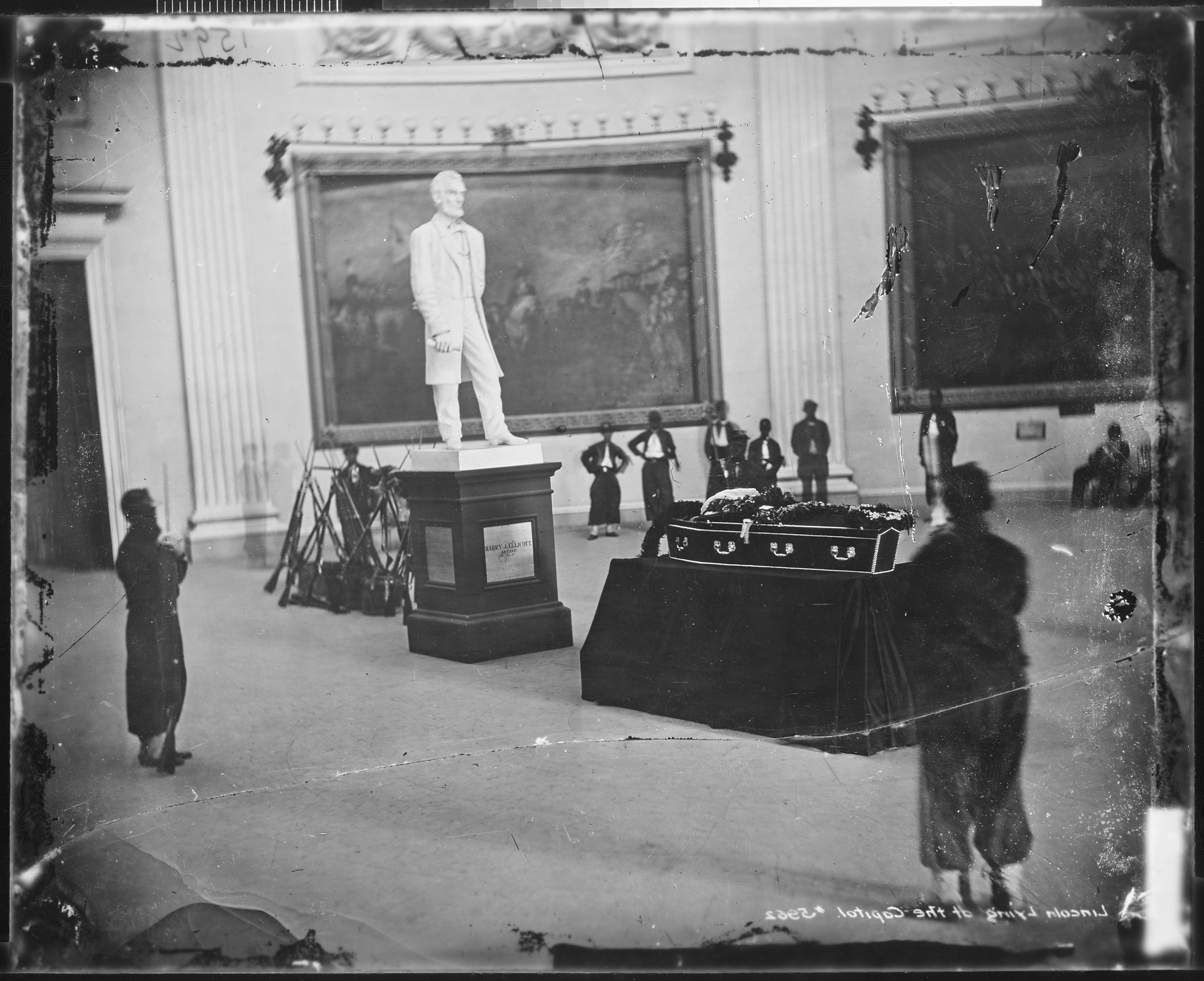
Stevens's casket lying in state in the Capitol Rotunda, guarded by black soldiers

Stevens's body was conveyed from his house to the Capitol by white and black pallbearers together. Thousands of mourners, of both races, filed past his casket as he lay in state at the United States Capitol rotunda; Stevens was the third man, after Clay and Lincoln, to receive that honor. African-American soldiers constituted the guard of honor. After a service there, his body was taken by funeral train to Lancaster, a city draped in black for the funeral. Stevens was laid to rest in Shreiner's Cemetery (today the Shreiner-Concord Cemetery); it allowed the burial of people of all races, although, at the time of Stevens's interment, only one African-American was buried there. The people of his district posthumously renominated him to Congress. They elected his former student Oliver J. Dickey to succeed him. When Congress convened in December 1868, there were several speeches in tribute to Stevens; they were afterward collected in book form.

== Personal life ==
Stevens never married, though there were rumors about his twenty-year relationship (1848–1868) with his widowed housekeeper, Lydia Hamilton Smith (1813–1884). She was a light-skinned African American; her husband Jacob and at least one of her sons were much darker than she was.

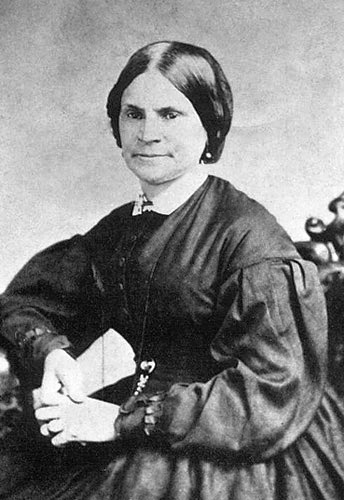
Lydia Hamilton Smith

It is uncertain if the Stevens-Smith relationship was romantic. The Democratic press, especially in the South, assumed so, and when he brought Smith to Washington in 1859, she managed his household, which did nothing to stop their insinuations. In the one brief surviving letter from Stevens to her, Stevens addresses her as "Mrs. Lydia Smith". Stevens insisted that his nieces and nephews refer to her as "Mrs. Smith", despite deference towards an African-American servant being almost unheard of at that time. They do so in surviving letters, warmly, asking Stevens to see that she comes with him next time he visits.

Supporting the view that their relationship was sexual, Brodie pointed to an 1868 letter in which Stevens compares himself to Vice President Richard M. Johnson, who lived openly with a series of African-American slave mistresses. Johnson was elected even though this became known during the 1836 presidential campaign of Martin Van Buren, a fact that Stevens noted. Stevens also expressed his bitterness about his own inability to gain election by the legislature to the Senate, or to secure a Cabinet position.

When Stevens died, Smith was at his bedside, along with his friend Simon Stevens, nephew Thaddeus Stevens Jr., two Catholic nuns, and several other individuals. Stevens was baptized a Catholic by one of the nuns on his deathbed.

Under Stevens's will, Smith was allowed to choose between a lump sum of $5,000 or a $500 annual allowance; she could also take any furniture in his house. With the inheritance, she purchased Stevens's house, where she had lived for many years. A Catholic, she chose to be buried in a Catholic cemetery, not near Stevens, although she left money for the upkeep of his grave.

Stevens had taken custody of his two young nephews, Thaddeus (often called "Thaddeus Jr.") and Alanson Joshua Stevens, after their parents died in Vermont. Alanson was sent to work at Stevens's business, Caledonia Forge; Thaddeus Jr. was expelled from Dartmouth College, though he subsequently graduated and was taken into his uncle's law practice. During the Civil War Alanson rose to be commanding captain of a Pennsylvania Volunteers field artillery unit and was killed in action at Chickamauga. After Alanson's death, his uncle used his influence to have Thaddeus Jr. made provost marshal of Lancaster.

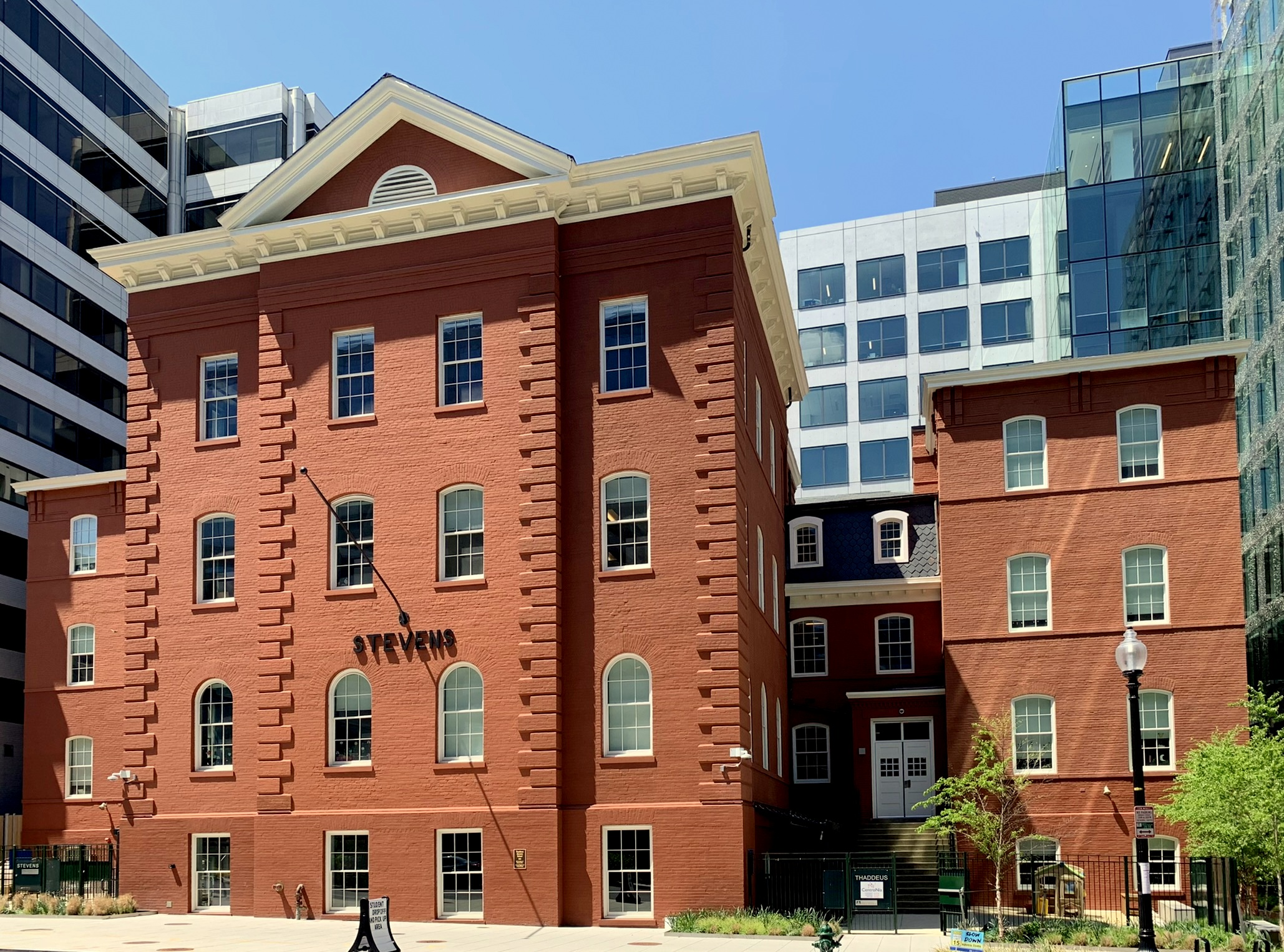
Thaddeus Stevens School, also known as Thaddeus Stevens Elementary School, located at 1050 21st Street, NW in Washington, D.C. The building was added to the National Register of Historic Places in 1980.

== Historical and popular view ==
As Stevens's biographer Richard N. Current put it, "to find out what really made the man go, the historian would need the combined aid of two experts from outside the profession – a psychoanalyst and a spiritualist." The historical view of Thaddeus Stevens has fluctuated widely since his death, generally in a manner inverse to that of Andrew Johnson. Early biographical works on Stevens were composed by men who knew him and reflected their viewpoints. Biographies at the turn of the twentieth century, such as those by Samuel McCall in 1899 and by James Albert Woodburn in 1913, presented Stevens favorably, as a sincere man, motivated by principle. Early African-American historian W. E. B. Du Bois called Stevens "a leader of the common people" and "a stern believer in democracy, both in politics and in industry." Pulitzer Prize-winning historian James Ford Rhodes argued that though Stevens had a "profound sympathy" towards the African-American, "coming straight from the heart," he also showed "virulence toward the South" and was "bitter and vindictive." This view of a vengeful Stevens originated during Reconstruction and persisted well into the 20th century.

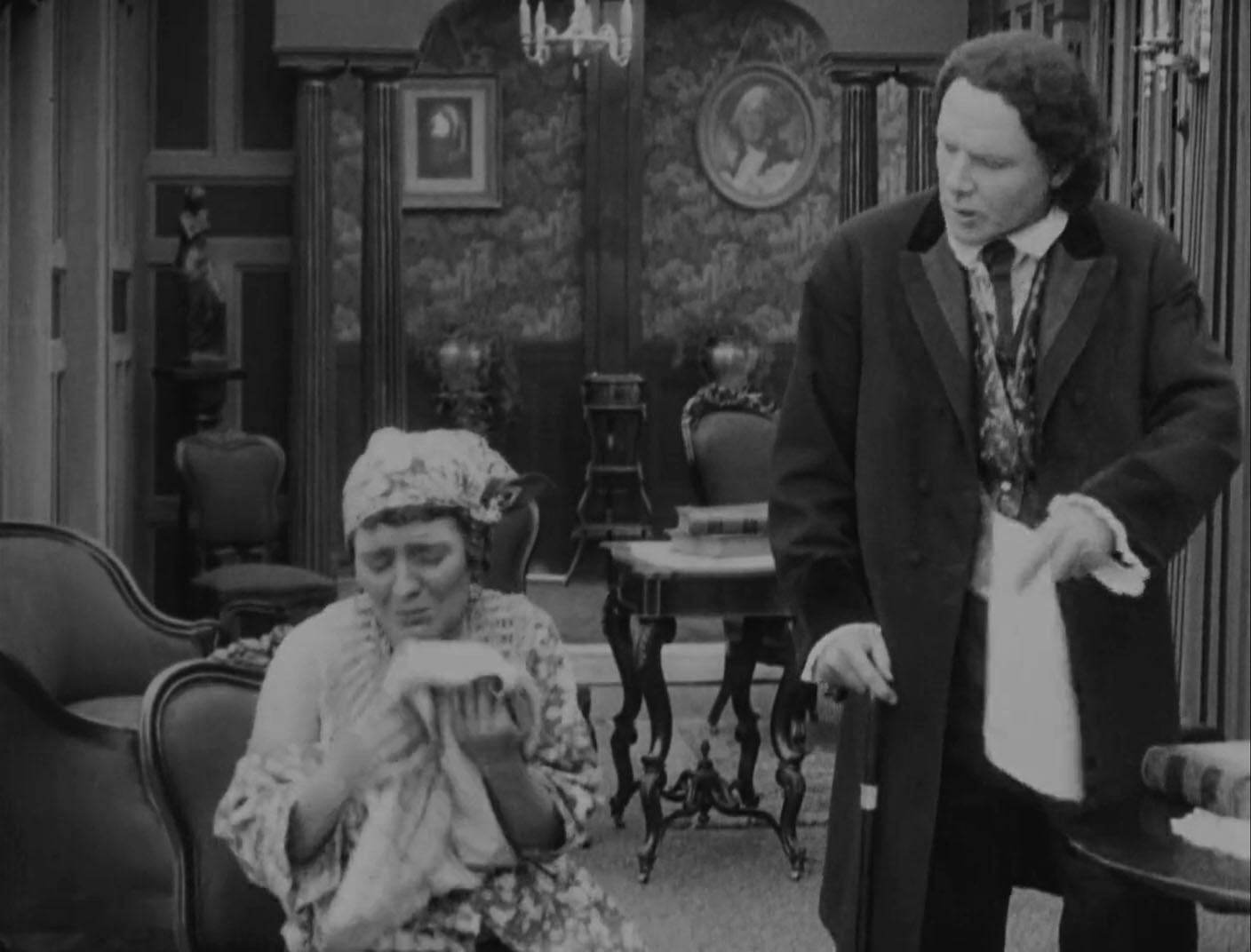
Ralph Lewis as Austin Stoneman and Mary Alden as Lydia Brown, The Birth of a Nation, 1915

With the advent of the Dunning School's view of Reconstruction after 1900, Stevens continued to be viewed negatively and generally as motivated by hatred. These historians, led by William Dunning, taught that Reconstruction had been an opportunity for radical politicians, motivated by ill will towards the South, to destroy what little of southern life and dignity the war had left. Dunning himself deemed Stevens "truculent, vindictive, and cynical". Lloyd Paul Stryker, who wrote a highly favorable 1929 biography of Johnson, labeled Stevens as a "horrible old man ... craftily preparing to strangle the bleeding, broken body of the South" and who thought it would be "a beautiful thing" to see "the white men, especially the white women of the South, writhing under negro domination". In 1915, D. W. Griffith's film The Birth of a Nation (based on the 1905 novel The Clansman, by Thomas Dixon Jr.) was released, containing the influenceable and ill-advised Congressman Austin Stoneman, who resembles Stevens down to the ill-fitting wig, limp, and African-American lover, Lydia Brown. This popular treatment reinforced and reinvigorated public prejudices towards Stevens. According to Foner, "as historians exalted the magnanimity of Lincoln and Andrew Johnson, Stevens came to symbolize Northern malice, revenge, and irrational hatred of the South." The highly popular historian James Truslow Adams described Stevens as "perhaps the most despicable, malevolent, and morally deformed character who has ever risen to high power in America".

Historians who penned biographies of Stevens in the late 1930s sought to move away from this perspective, seeking to rehabilitate him and his political career. Thomas F. Woodley, writing in 1937, shows admiration of Stevens, but he attributed Stevens's driving force to bitterness over his clubfoot. In his 1939 biography, Alphonse Miller found that the former congressman was motivated by a desire for justice. Both men were convinced that recent books had not treated him fairly. Richard Current's 1942 work reflected current Beardian historiography, which saw all American history, including Reconstruction, as a three-way economic struggle between the industrialists of the Northeast (represented by Stevens), the planters of the South, and the farmers of the Midwest. Current argued that Stevens was motivated in his Reconstruction policies by frustrated ambitions and a desire to use his political position to promote industrial capitalism and advance the Republican Party. He concluded that despite Stevens's egalitarian beliefs, he promoted inequality, for "none had done more than he to bring on the age of Big Business, with its concentration of wealth."

With Ralph Korngold's 1955 biography of Stevens, the neoabolitionist school of historians began to consider the former congressman. These professors rejected the earlier view that those who had gone South to aid the African-Americans after the war were "rapscallion carpetbaggers" defeated by "saintly redeemers." Instead, they applauded those who had sought to end slavery and forward civil rights and castigated Johnson for obstructionism. They believed that the African-American was central to Reconstruction, and the only things wrong with the congressional program were that it did not go far enough and that it stopped too soon. Brodie's 1959 biography of Stevens was of this school. Controversial in its conclusions for being a psychobiography, it found that Stevens was a "consummate underdog who identified with the oppressed" and whose intelligence won him success, while his consciousness of his clubfoot stunted his social development. According to Brodie, this also made him unwilling to marry a woman of his social standing.

Scholars who followed Brodie continued to chip away at the idea of Stevens as a vindictive dictator who dominated Congress to get his way. In 1960, Eric McKitrick deemed Stevens "a picturesque and adroit politician, but a very limited one," whose career was "a long comic sequence of devilish schemes which, one after another, kept blowing up in his face." From the mid-1970s onward, Foner argued that Stevens's role was in staking out a radical position, though events, not Stevens, caused the Republicans to support him. Michael Les Benedict in 1974 suggested that Stevens's reputation as a dictator was based more on his personality than on his influence. In 1989, Allan Bogue found that as chairman of Ways and Means, Stevens was "less than complete master" of his committee.

Historian Hans Trefousse stated in a 1969 study of the Radical Republicans that Stevens's "one abiding passion was equality". In 1991, he noted that Stevens "was one of the most influential representatives ever to serve in Congress. [He dominated] the House with his wit, knowledge of parliamentary law, and sheer willpower, even though he was often unable to prevail." In his 1997 biography of Stevens, though, he took a position similar to McKitrick's: that Stevens was a relatively marginal figure, with his influence often limited by his extremism. Trefousse believed Brodie went too far – in deeming Stevens's clubfoot responsible for so much about him and in giving full credence to the Stevens-Smith relationship – both those things cannot now be determined with certainty.

Stevens was celebrated for his wit and sarcasm. When Lincoln appointed rival Pennsylvania Republican leader Simon Cameron as Secretary of War, Stevens expressed disgust at Cameron's reputed corruption. Asked whether Cameron was a thief, Stevens supposedly replied, "I don't think he would steal a red-hot stove." When Cameron objected to this characterization, Stevens said "I believe I told you he would not steal a red hot stove. I will now take that back." Stevens's ill-fitting wigs were a well-known topic of discussion in Washington, but when a female admirer who apparently did not know asked for a lock of Stevens's hair as a keepsake, he removed his hairpiece, held it out to her, and "invited her to help herself."

Steven Spielberg's 2012 film Lincoln, in which Stevens was portrayed by Tommy Lee Jones, brought new public interest in Stevens. Jones's character is portrayed as the central figure among the radicals, responsible in large part for the passage of the Thirteenth Amendment. Historian Matthew Pinsker notes that Stevens is referred to only four times in Doris Kearns Goodwin's 2005 book Team of Rivals, on which screenwriter Tony Kushner based the film's screenplay; other radicals were folded into the character. Stevens is depicted as unable to moderate his views for the sake of gaining passage of the amendment until after he is urged to do so by the ever-compromising Lincoln. According to Aaron Bady in his article about the film and how it portrays the radicals, "he's the uncle everyone is embarrassed of, even if they love him too much to say so. He's not a leader, he's a liability, one whose shining heroic moment will be when he keeps silent about what he really believes." The film depicts a Stevens-Smith sexual relationship; Pinsker comments that "it may well have been true that they were lovers, but by injecting this issue into the movie, the filmmakers risk leaving the impression for some viewers that the 'secret' reason for Stevens's egalitarianism was his desire to legitimize his romance across racial lines."

== Legacy ==
Buildings associated with Stevens and Lydia Hamilton Smith in Lancaster are being renovated by the local historical society, LancasterHistory. In his will, Stevens made several bequests, leaving much of his estate to his nephew Thaddeus Jr., on condition that he refrain from alcohol. If he did not, that bequest would establish an orphanage in Lancaster open to all races and nationalities without discrimination. A legal fight over his estate ensued, and it was not until 1894 that the courts settled the matter, awarding $50,000 (~$1.66 million in 2025) to found the orphanage. The school today is the Thaddeus Stevens College of Technology, in Lancaster.

Schools named after Stevens include Thaddeus Stevens Elementary School in Washington, D.C., founded in 1868 as the first school built for African-American children there. It was segregated for the first 86 years of its existence. In 1977, Amy Carter, daughter of President Jimmy Carter, a Georgian, was enrolled there, the first child of a sitting president to attend public school in almost 70 years.

On April 2, 2022, in front of the Adams County Courthouse in Gettysburg, Pennsylvania, a statue of Stevens was unveiled as part of a celebration of Stevens's 230th birthday. The statue was commissioned by the Thaddeus Stevens Society and was sculpted by multidisciplinary artist Alex Paul Loza.

== See also ==
- List of civil rights leaders

== Bibliography ==
- Andreasen, Bryon C. (Summer 2000). Review of Trefousse, Hans L., Thaddeus Stevens: Nineteenth-Century Egalitarian, in Journal of the Abraham Lincoln Association, vol. 21, no. 2 (Summer 2000), pp. 75–81.
- Berlin, Jean V. (April 1993). "Thaddeus Stevens and His Biographers". Pennsylvania History. 60 (2). University Park: Penn State University Press: 153–62. JSTOR 27773615.
- Bond, Horace Mann. "Social and Economic Forces in Alabama Reconstruction." Journal of Negro History 23(3), July 1938. JSTOR 2714686, 7 July 2013.
- Brodie, Fawn (1966) [1959]. Thaddeus Stevens: Scourge of the South (Norton Library ed.). New York: W. W. Norton & Co., Inc. ISBN 0393003310. online
- Bryant-Jones, Mildred (1941). "The Political Program of Thaddeus Stevens, 1865". Phylon. 2 (2, 2nd Qtr. 1941). Atlanta: Clark Atlanta University: 147–54. doi:10.2307/271784. JSTOR 271784.
- Castel, Albert E. (1979). The Presidency of Andrew Johnson. American Presidency. Lawrence: The Regents Press of Kansas. ISBN 0700601902.
- Cox, LaWanda and John H. Cox. Politics, Principle, and Prejudice 1865–1866: Dilemma of Reconstruction America. London: Collier-Macmillan, 1963.
- Current, Richard N. (October 1947). "Love, Hate, and Thaddeus Stevens". Pennsylvania History. 14 (4). University Park: Penn State University Press: 259–72. JSTOR 27766829. text
- Donald, David Herbert (1995). Lincoln. London: Jonathan Cape. ISBN 0684808463.
- Du Bois, W. E. B. Black Reconstruction: An Essay Toward a History of the Part Which Black Folk Played in the Attempt to Reconstruct Democracy in America, 1860–1880. New York: Russell & Russell, 1935.
- Epps, Garrett (2006). Democracy Reborn: The Fourteenth Amendment and the Fight for Equal Rights in post-Civil War American. New York: Henry Holt and Company. ISBN 080507130X.
- Foner, Eric. Politics and Ideology in the Age of the Civil War. Oxford University Press, 1980. ISBN 978-0199727087
- Foner, Eric (2014) [1988]. Reconstruction: America's Unfinished Revolution, 1863–1877. New York: Harper Perennial. ISBN 978-0062354518.
- Gans, David H. (November 16, 2011). "Perfecting the Declaration: The Text and History of the Equal Protection Clause of the Fourteenth Amendment". Constitutional Accountability Center. Archived from the original (PDF) on January 31, 2015.
- Glatfelter, Charles H. (April 1993). "Thaddeus Stevens in the Cause of Education: The Gettysburg Years". Pennsylvania History. 60 (2). University Park: Penn State University Press: 163–75. JSTOR 27773616. text
- Hamilton, Howard Devon. The Legislative and Judicial History of the Thirteenth Amendment. Political Science dissertation at the University of Illinois; accepted May 15, 1950. ProQuest 304361240
- Halbrook, Stephen P. (1998). Freedmen, the Fourteenth Amendment, and the Right to Bear Arms, 1866–1876. Westport, Ct.: Greenwood. ISBN 0275963314.
- Soifer, Aviam. "Federal Protection, Paternalism, and the Virtually Forgotten Prohibition of Voluntary Peonage". Columbia Law Review 112(7), November 2012; pp. 1607–40.
- Stewart, David O. (2009). Impeached: The Trial of President Andrew Johnson and the Fight for Lincoln's Legacy. New York: Simon and Schuster. ISBN 978-1416547495.
- Tsesis, Alexander. The Thirteenth Amendment and American Freedom: A Legal History. New York University Press, 2004. ISBN 0814782760
- Vorenberg, Michael. Final Freedom: The Civil War, the Abolition of Slavery, and the Thirteenth Amendment. Cambridge University Press, 2001. ISBN 978-1139428002.
- Woodley, Thomas F. Great Leveler: The Life of Thaddeus Stevens (1937) online

== Sources ==
- Current, Richard Nelson. Old Thad Stevens: A Story of Ambition (1980 [1942]), Westport, Ct.: Greenwood Press, ISBN 978-0313225697, OCLC 256434391, a scholarly biography that argues Stevens was primarily concerned with enhancing his power, the power of the Republican Party, and the needs of big business, especially iron-making and railroads.
- Levine, Bruce C. (2021). Thaddeus Stevens: Civil War Revolutionary, Fighter for Racial Justice. New York: Simon & Schuster. ISBN 978-1476793375.
- Meltzer, Milton (1967). Thaddeus Stevens and the Fight for Negro Rights. New York: Thomas Y. Crowell Company. ISBN 978-0690809732. online
- Trefousse, Hans L. (1997). Thaddeus Stevens: Nineteenth-Century Egalitarian. Chapel Hill: University of North Carolina Press. ISBN 0807856665. online

U.S. House of Representatives
Preceded by John Strohm	Member of the U.S. House of Representatives from Pennsylvania's 8th congressional district 1849–1853	Succeeded by Henry Augustus Muhlenberg
Preceded by Anthony Roberts	Member of the U.S. House of Representatives from Pennsylvania's 9th congressional district 1859–1868	Succeeded by Oliver Dickey
Preceded by John Sherman	Chair of the House Ways and Means Committee; 1861–1865	Succeeded by Justin Morrill
New office	Chair of the House Appropriations Committee; 1865–1868	Succeeded by Elihu B. Washburne
Honorary titles
Preceded by Abraham Lincoln	Persons who have lain in state or honor in the United States Capitol rotunda 1868	Succeeded by Charles Sumner
