= Leslie Herson =

American businesswoman and artist (1942-2008)

- Born: Leslie Bambi Fishman; November 2, 1942; Brooklyn, New York, United States
- Died: August 16, 2008 (aged 65); Carversville, Pennsylvania, United States
- Occupation(s): Businesswoman, artist
- Spouse(s): Norman Kamerling, Richard Herson

Leslie Herson (November 2, 1942 – August 16, 2008) was an American businesswoman and artist. She is known for creating the cult vintage store Love Saves The Day or LSD, which operated in New York City's East Village from 1966 until 2009. She is credited for being one of the first to recognize the value of Kitsch items before flea markets became popular.

== Personal life ==
She was born Leslie Bambi Fishman in Brooklyn, and moved to Manhattan to attend New York University, where she graduated with a fine-art degree. In the early 1970s she operated a vintage store in Hawaii. Her love of vintage clothes and antiques inspired her to open her own store. She became well known in the New York City area, especially amongst thrift store aficionados. Originally she planned to design her own clothing to be featured in the store, but eventually she only sold used clothing, and no original creations. Her first marriage was to Norman Kamerling, a New York filmmaker. She met her second husband, Richard "Ritchie" Herson, in 1977 when he came to her inquiring about renting an apartment from an ad he saw in The Village Voice. They began dating and soon married. She had an older sister, Sandy, her mother Hana, and her father Jesse.

== Love Saves The Day ==
Herson opened the original Loves Saves the Day store in 1966 on 77 E. 7th. She stated the name was a nickname for the drug LSD, noting that at that time in the 1960s, many of the people she knew were on drugs. The title is also a symbol of her self-described hippie lifestyle. She was known for her collection of Beatles memorabilia, and the store title was also inspired by the song "Lucy in the Sky with Diamonds". The store operated at that location until 1982, when she moved to the now famous location on Second Avenue and E. 7th Street, from where the store operated from 1983 until 2009. In the summer of 1984, she allowed for filming to take place at the store. The film was Desperately Seeking Susan, in which Madonna and Rosanna Arquette visit the store. Appearing in the film made the store even more popular. Many local artists and production designers came to Leslie for items used for film and stage sets. Inside the store, there was an autograph wall that contained signatures from some of the many famous visitors over the years, including Marc Jacobs, Joey Ramone, Alice Cooper, Björk, Kelly Osbourne, Tim Burton, Drea de Matteo, and Debbie Harry. The store was managed by Martin Ruginis, who painted the famous colorful exterior, and created many of the window displays. The store was featured often on television as well. In 1996, MTV VJ Kennedy hosted the show Alternative Nation live from the store.

In 2005 the store was in danger of closing due to rent-increases from the landlords. She was able to negotiate a three-year lease that kept the store going. The original rent on the store was around one hundred dollars per month, which had changed to eleven thousand per month.

== Store closing and death ==
She died on August 16, 2008, in Carversville, Pennsylvania, at the age of 65. Her husband Richard, who described the store as her "canvas" as an artist, soon decided he could no longer operate the store in the East Village, and it was announced it would close, which it did in January 2009. The Herson's maintained an apartment in the East Village, and also had a country home in Carversville, and operated a second location of Love Saves the Day in New Hope, Pennsylvania, which her husband continues to operate as of 2015. Some of the window displays Leslie had created caused controversy in the New Hope community due to their extreme nature.

On Thursday March 26, 2015, the building that formerly housed the famous Love Saves the Day store was destroyed by the 2015 East Village Gas Explosion. Many of the local residents mourned the loss of the building where the store once was, as it had been a focal point in East Village, Manhattan counter-culture. After the store closed it was briefly used as a restaurant, but at the time of the fire, the store was vacant.
