= Merson =

Merson is a surname. Notable people with the surname include:

- Billy Merson (1879–1947), English music hall performer and songwriter
- George F. Merson (1866–1959), Scottish pharmacist who produced surgical catgut
- Greg Merson (born 1987), American professional poker player
- Jack Merson (1922–2000), former second baseman in Major League Baseball
- Luc-Olivier Merson (1846–1920), French academic painter and illustrator also known for his postage stamp and currency designs
- Paul Merson (born 1968), retired English football player, and former player-manager of Walsall
