= Law & Order season 25 =

Season of American television series

Law & Order
- Season 25
- Promotional poster via Peacock
- Showrunner: Rick Eid
- Starring: Reid Scott; Maura Tierney; Hugh Dancy; Odelya Halevi; Tony Goldwyn; David Ajala
- No. of episodes: 21

Release
- Original network: NBC
- Original release: September 25, 2025 – May 14, 2026

Season chronology
- ← Previous; Season 24 Next → Season 26

The twenty-fifth season of American police procedural crime drama Law & Order premiered on NBC on September 25, 2025, and concluded on May 14, 2026. The season was produced by Wolf Entertainment, in conjunction with Universal Television, and featured 21 episodes.

Rick Eid served as showrunner. Reid Scott, Maura Tierney, Hugh Dancy, Odelya Halevi, and Tony Goldwyn reprised their roles as Senior Detective Vincent Riley, Lieutenant Jessica Brady, Executive Assistant District Attorney Nolan Price, Assistant District Attorney Samantha Maroun, and District Attorney Nicholas Baxter, respectively. Beginning with the seventh episode of the season, David Ajala joined the cast as series regular Junior Detective Theo Walker.

== Cast and characters ==
=== Main ===
- Reid Scott as Senior Detective Vincent Riley
- Maura Tierney as Lieutenant Jessica Brady
- Hugh Dancy as Executive Assistant District Attorney Nolan Price
- Odelya Halevi as Assistant District Attorney Samantha Maroun
- Tony Goldwyn as District Attorney Nicholas Baxter
- David Ajala as Junior Detective Theo Walker

=== Crossover stars from Law & Order: Special Victims Unit ===
- Mariska Hargitay as Captain Olivia Benson
- Ice T as Sergeant Odafin "Fin" Tutuola
- Kelli Giddish as Sergeant Amanda Rollins
- Kevin Kane as Detective Terry Bruno
- Noma Dumezweni as Chief Kathryn Tynan
- Elizabeth Marvel as Defense Attorney Rita Calhoun

=== Crossover stars from FBI ===
- Thomas Philip O'Neill as Dr. Neil Mosbach

=== Recurring ===
- Connie Shi as Detective Violet Yee

=== Guest ===
- Amanda Warren as Defense Attorney Camilla Paymor
- Lana Young as Trial Judge Mebane
- Kerry Bishé as Grace Hall
- Tawny Cypress as Defense Attorney Erin Grassley
- Bernadette Quigley as Judge Carol Hamilton
- Katrina Lenk as Brenda Fallon
- Eric Ladin as Kevin Goodall
- Tom Irwin as Norman Munson
- Jay Hieron as Taxi Driver
- Eric Lange as Defense Attorney Chris Damaso
- Alano Miller as Brad Addis
- Gary Perez as Judge Sydney Bolden
- Joshua Malina as Kevin Bradley
- Hill Harper as Defense Attorney Eric Ferguson
- Toby Leonard Moore as Jack Drell
- Ryan Eggold as Matt Riley
- Alimi Ballard as Defense Attorney Ron Delahunt
- Tobias Truvillion as Shane Willis
- Ryan O'Nan as Jim Pickett
- Lindsey Broad as Kate Pickett
- Maury Ginsberg as Defense Attorney Scott Quinn
- Dylan Baker as Defense Attorney Sanford Rems
- Michael Lynche as Creston 'Hollow Point' Reeves
- Necar Zadegan as Bonnie Kimura
- Margaret Anne Florence as Amanda Gladstone-Nestor
- Philip Casnoff as Stephen Cyrus
- Shannon Lucio as Carri Valenti
- Daniel Keith as Jason Valenti
- Ryan Broussard as Ryan Chase
- Alex Neustaedter as Leo Brady
- Victoria Cartagena as Defense Attorney Yolanda Matos
- Ennis Esmer as Marius Cole
- Eileen Galindo as Judge Angela Dillow
- Emily Bergl as Kate Leavy
- Eisa Davis as Defense Attorney Virginia Hogan
- Daryl Edwards as Trial Judge Paul Gifford
- Alexandra Neil as Claire Turner
- Scott Adsit as Brian Leavy
- Matt Walsh as Defense Attorney Joe Sirianni
- Stéphanie Szostak as Carol Massey
- Tommy Dewey as Tate Harris
- Susan Misner as Defense Attorney Alison Witt
- James Austin Kerr as Dutch Wilmot
- Joe Finfera as Howard Perry
- Brandon Finn as Marco
- Jane Lynch as Defense Attorney Cordelia Travers
- Rain as Cory Mason
- Lipica Shah as Dr. Chandra Patel
- Michael O'Keefe as Archbishop Keane
- Rob Yang as Defense Attorney Max Wood
- Julio Perillán as Leonard Hawkins
- Joseph Perrino as Joe Whittaker
- Alanna Ubach as Defense Attorney Abigail Donahue
- Kelli Williams as Ann Merrick
- Eric Stoltz as Evan Cole
- Zach McGowan as Cash White
- Veronica Falcón as Defense Attorney Victoria Potter
- Angel Desai as Trial Judge Roberta Hines
- Alicia Minshew as Sophia Cole
- Kyle Harris as Lucas Peters
- Max Casella as Steven Delvecchio
- William Ragsdale as Fire Marshal Julian Jenca
- Željko Ivanek as Defense Attorney Charles Banks
- Chance Kelly as Admiral Rusten Garvey
- Anthony Edwards as Trial Judge Kenneth Sullivan

== Episodes ==
Law & Order season 25 episodes
No. overall	No. in season	Title	Directed by	Written by	Original release date	Prod. code	U.S. viewers (millions)
524	1	"Street Justice"	Alex Hall	Rick Eid	September 25, 2025	2501	3.59
After events in "Look the Other Way", Price meets with Baxter, unsure whether Maroun killed Carter Mills. Yee finds Edgar who saw a woman saying, "You deserve this" before firing. Brady gets a warrant for Maroun's .38, which she threw in the East River, "afraid of what I might do with it." Riley finds a man who bumped into a young woman wearing a dark hoodie near the scene; he rules out Maroun from a six-pack. Riley and Yee talk to girlfriend Julia Keaton, who says Carter argued with his sister, Allison Mills, who alibis and claims Keaton broke up with Mills. Brady arrests Keaton, who bought a gun shortly after Mills's verdict. Defense Attorney Camilla Paymor argues self-defense, because Mills was going to kill Keaton. Judge Mebane denies Price's petition to exclude Mills's prior murder trial, because Paymor objected there are exceptions if the defendant was aware of prior bad acts. Keaton testifies Mills raped and threatened her. Arguing strategy, Maroun admonishes Price for not having the guts to convict Mills of murder. In private, Keaton admits she ambushed Mills. Maroun says, "Stop talking", telling Price, "This was premeditated...an assassination. On paper, anyway." Keaton accepts a manslaughter plea. Meanwhile, Shaw transfers to Brooklyn's 8-8 precinct.
525	2	"Hindsight"	David Grossman	Scott Gold & Will Lapp	October 2, 2025	2503	3.65
526	3	"White Lies"	Milena Govich	Jennifer Vanderbes	October 9, 2025	2504	3.11
527	4	"Two and Twenty"	Martha Mitchell	Rick Eid	October 16, 2025	2505	3.48
Tony Goldwyn does not appear in this episode.
528	5	"Bend the Knee"	Michael Smith	Scott Gold	October 23, 2025	2502	3.45
Odelya Halevi does not appear in this episode.
529	6	"Brotherly Love"	Alex Hall	Rick Eid	October 30, 2025	2506	3.62
Odelya Halevi does not appear in this episode.
530	7	"Guardian"	Carlos Bernard	Teleplay by : Art Alamo & Ajani Jackson; Story by : Ajani Jackson & Jolie Huang	November 13, 2025	2507	3.52
First appearance of David Ajala as Detective Theo Walker.
531	8	"Parasite"	Michael Pressman	Jennifer Vanderbes & Jolie Huang	November 20, 2025	2508	3.71
532	9	"Snowflakes (Part 1)"	Jean de Segonzac	Scott Gold	January 8, 2026	2509	3.97
Note: This episode begins a crossover event that concludes on Law & Order: Special Victims Unit season 27 episode 9.
533	10	"Dream On"	Néstor Carbonell	Rick Eid & Tori Nove	January 15, 2026	2510	3.88
Odelya Halevi does not appear in this episode.
534	11	"The Enemy of All Women"	Norberto Barba	Art Alamo	January 22, 2026	2511	4.02
Maura Tierney does not appear in this episode.
535	12	"Never Say Goodbye"	Fred Berner	Scott Gold & Will Lapp	January 29, 2026	2512	4.15
536	13	"New Normal"	Norberto Barba	Rick Eid & Ajani Jackson	February 26, 2026	2513	3.93
Maura Tierney does not appear in this episode.
537	14	"Remedies"	Martha Mitchell	Jennifer Vanderbes	March 5, 2026	2514	3.78
Reid Scott & Tony Goldwyn do not appear in this episode.
538	15	"Bright Lights"	Peter Stebbings	Rick Eid	March 12, 2026	2515	3.50
539	16	"Fate's Cruel Joke"	Alex Hall	Art Alamo	April 2, 2026	2516	3.35
Tony Goldwyn does not appear in this episode.
540	17	"Beyond Measure"	Jean de Segonzac	Scott Gold & Will Lapp	April 9, 2026	2517	3.84
541	18	"Ride or Die"	Oscar Lozoya	Jolie Huang & Jennifer Vanderbes	April 23, 2026	2518	3.48
David Ajala & Hugh Dancy do not appear in this episode.
542	19	"Accidentally Like a Martyr"	David Grossman	Rick Eid	April 30, 2026	2519	3.48
543	20	"Once Burned"	Michael Smith	Art Alamo & Ajani Jackson	May 7, 2026	2520	3.51
544	21	"Liberty"	Alex Hall	Rick Eid & Scott Gold	May 14, 2026	2521	3.98

== Ratings ==
Viewership and ratings per episode of Law & Order season 25 ratings
No.	Title	Air date	Rating/share (18–49)	Viewers (millions)	DVR (18–49)	DVR viewers (millions)	Total (18–49)	Total viewers (millions)	Ref.
1	"Street Justice"	September 25, 2025	0.2/3	3.59	0.1	1.03	0.3	4.62	
2	"Hindsight"	October 2, 2025	0.2/2	3.65	0.1	1.08	0.3	4.73	
3	"White Lies"	October 9, 2025	0.2/2	3.11	0.1	1.04	0.3	4.15	
4	"Two and Twenty"	October 16, 2025	0.2/3	3.48	0.1	1.24	0.3	4.72	
5	"Bend the Knee"	October 23, 2025	0.3/3	3.45	—N/a	—N/a	—N/a	—N/a	
6	"Brotherly Love"	October 30, 2025	0.2/3	3.62	—N/a	—N/a	—N/a	—N/a	
7	"Guardian"	November 13, 2025	0.2/3	3.52	—N/a	—N/a	—N/a	—N/a	
8	"Parasite"	November 20, 2025	0.3/3	3.71	—N/a	—N/a	—N/a	—N/a	
9	"Snowflakes"	January 8, 2026	0.3/3	3.97	—N/a	—N/a	—N/a	—N/a	
10	"Dream On"	January 15, 2026	0.3/5	3.88	—N/a	—N/a	—N/a	—N/a	
11	"The Enemy of All Women"	January 22, 2026	0.3/4	4.02	—N/a	—N/a	—N/a	—N/a	
12	"Never Say Goodbye"	October 29, 2026	0.3/4	4.15	—N/a	—N/a	—N/a	—N/a	
13	"New Normal"	February 26, 2026	0.2/3	3.93	—N/a	—N/a	—N/a	—N/a	
14	"Remedies"	March 5, 2026	0.3/4	3.78	—N/a	—N/a	—N/a	—N/a	
15	"Bright Lights"	March 12, 2026	0.3/3	3.50	—N/a	—N/a	—N/a	—N/a	
16	"Fate's Cruel Joke"	April 2, 2026	0.2/3	3.23	—N/a	—N/a	—N/a	—N/a	
17	"Beyond Measure"	April 9, 2026	0.2/4	3.84	—N/a	—N/a	—N/a	—N/a	
18	"Ride or Die"	April 23, 2026	0.2/2	3.48	—N/a	—N/a	—N/a	—N/a	
19	"Accidentally Like a Martyr"	April 30, 2026	0.2/3	3.48	—N/a	—N/a	—N/a	—N/a	
20	"Once Burned"	May 7, 2026	0.3/4	3.51	—N/a	—N/a	—N/a	—N/a	
21	"Liberty"	May 14, 2026	0.3/4	3.98	—N/a	—N/a	—N/a	—N/a	
