= Law & Order season 26 =

Season of American television series

Law & Order
- Season 26
- Promotional poster
- Showrunner: Rick Eid
- Starring: Reid Scott; David Ajala; Maura Tierney; Hugh Dancy; Odelya Halevi; Tony Goldwyn; James Badge Dale
- No. of episodes: 6

Release
- Original network: NBC
- Original release: October 8, 2026 – present

Season chronology
- ← Previous; Season 25

The twenty-sixth season of American police procedural crime drama Law & Order premiered on NBC on October 8, 2026. The season is produced by Wolf Entertainment, in conjunction with Universal Television.

Rick Eid returned as showrunner. Reid Scott, David Ajala, Maura Tierney, Hugh Dancy, Odelya Halevi, and Tony Goldwyn reprised their roles as Senior Detective Vincent Riley, Junior Detective Theo Walker, Lieutenant Jessica Brady, Executive Assistant District Attorney Nolan Price, Assistant District Attorney Samantha Maroun, and District Attorney Nicholas Baxter, respectively. The second episode featured the exit of Scott, while James Badge Dale made his debut as Senior Detective Rob Calvino.

== Production ==
=== Development ===
Law & Order's renewal for a twenty-sixth season was announced on May 11, 2026. The renewal was described as an "11th hour decision" by NBC, following budget cuts and a shift in scheduling. Lisa Katz, president of scripted content for NBC and Peacock, revealed that despite the decision, there was no question over whether or not the series was to be renewed, insisting it came down to "figuring out what went where".

=== Filming ===
Filming for the season commenced in July 2026.

=== Casting ===
In July 2026, it was announced Reid Scott, who joined the series in the twenty-third season, would exit the role of Senior Detective Vincent Riley. Reports claimed Scott opted to exit, citing the commute from California, where he resides with his family to New York, where the series is filmed. James Badge Dale was named as Scott's successor in a then-unnamed role. In an August 2026 interview with Give Me My Remote, showrunner Rick Eid revealed the name of Dale's character to be Rob Calvino. Scott exited during the second episode, in an episode that centered around Vincent Riley; Dale made his first appearance during the same episode.

== Cast and characters ==
=== Main ===
- Reid Scott as Senior Detective Vincent Riley (Note: Scott appeared as a series regular for the first two episodes.)
- David Ajala as Junior Detective Theo Walker
- Maura Tierney as Lieutenant Jessica Brady
- Hugh Dancy as Executive Assistant District Attorney Nolan Price
- Odelya Halevi as Assistant District Attorney Samantha Maroun
- Tony Goldwyn as District Attorney Nicholas Baxter
- James Badge Dale as Senior Detective Rob Calvino (Note: Dale first appeared during the second episode, and became a series regular starting with the third episode.)

=== Guest stars ===
Vincent Kartheiser guest-starred in the season's premiere episode, "Ghost in the Machine", as Chuck Klein, a tech visionary in the field of artificial intelligence. Ryan Eggold reprised his role as Matt Riley, brother of Scott's character, Vincent Riley. Eid also teased the potential of "other characters that try homicide cases" appearing during the season as a result of Odelya Halevi's expected maternity leave. He further hinted at the potential of Special Victims Unit characters appearing as part of ongoing crossovers with the spinoff series.

== Episodes ==
Law & Order season 26 episodes
No. overall	No. in season	Title	Directed by	Written by	Original release date	Prod. code
545	1	"Ghost in the Machine"	Alex Hall	Rick Eid & Scott Gold	October 8, 2026	2601
546	2	"Into the Mystic"	Eriq La Salle	Rick Eid	October 15, 2026	2602
Reid Scott exited the role of Senior Detective Vincent Riley at the beginning of the episode.; First appearance of James Badge Dale as Senior Detective Rob Calvino.
547	3	"Bad News"	David Grossman	Art Alamo	October 22, 2026	2603
Dale is promoted to series regular.
548	4	"Property"	Carlos Bernard	Jennifer Vanderbes	October 29, 2026	2604
549	5	"Rage Bait"	Milena Govich	Scott Gold & Ajani Jackson	November 5, 2026	2605
550	6	"Do No Harm"	Néstor Carbonell	Art Alamo & Thomas Wong	November 12, 2026	2606
551	7	"Class War"	TBA	Rick Eid	December 3, 2026	2607
552	8	TBA	TBA	Scott Gold & Will Lapp	January 7, 2027	2608

== Reception ==
Ahead of the season's premiere, USA Today previewed the topic of the episode, in which detectives and the DA's office deals with the "rapidly expanding power of artificial intelligence" and the struggles of relegating its use. The publication described the episode's subject matter as "another pressing real-world issue".
