= Law & Order season 22 =

Season of American television series

Law & Order
- Season 22
- Promotional poster
- Starring: Jeffrey Donovan; Mehcad Brooks; Camryn Manheim; Hugh Dancy; Odelya Halevi; Sam Waterston
- No. of episodes: 22

Release
- Original network: NBC
- Original release: September 22, 2022 – May 18, 2023

Season chronology
- ← Previous; Season 21 Next → Season 23

The twenty-second season of Law & Order, an American police procedural and legal drama, premiered on NBC on September 22, 2022 and concluded on May 18, 2023. The season contained 22 episodes. Mehcad Brooks joins the main cast as Detective Jalen Shaw, following cast member Anthony Anderson's exit after season 21.

== Cast and characters ==
=== Main ===
- Jeffrey Donovan as Senior Detective Frank Cosgrove
- Mehcad Brooks as Junior Detective Jalen Shaw
- Camryn Manheim as Lieutenant Kate Dixon
- Hugh Dancy as Executive Assistant District Attorney Nolan Price
- Odelya Halevi as Assistant District Attorney Samantha Maroun
- Sam Waterston as District Attorney Jack McCoy

=== Crossover stars ===
==== Law & Order: Special Victims Unit ====
- Mariska Hargitay as Captain Olivia Benson
- Kelli Giddish as Detective Amanda Rollins
- Peter Scanavino as Assistant District Attorney Dominick Carisi Jr.
- Michael Kostroff as Defense Attorney Evan Braun
- Tonye Patano as Trial Judge Linda Maskin

==== Law & Order: Organized Crime ====
- Christopher Meloni as Detective Elliot Stabler
- Ainsley Seiger as Detective Jet Slootmaekers

=== Recurring ===
- Connie Shi as Detective Violet Yee
- Alayna Hester as Lily Cosgrove
- Milica Govich as Trial Judge Leanne Dreben
- Antonio Edwards Suarez as Judge Carter Nevins

=== Guest ===
- Sasha Alexander as Congresswoman Kristin Bartell
- David Aaron Baker as David DeLuca
- Dylan Baker as Defense Attorney Sanford Rems
- Patrick Ball as Jason Wheeler
- Marsha Stephanie Blake as Erica Knight
- Michael Boatman as Defense Attorney Dave Seaver
- Geneva Carr as Jenny Newhall
- Claire Coffee as Defense Attorney Andrea Rankin
- Liza Colón-Zayas as Defense Attorney Lara Vega
- Theodus Crane as William Barnes
- Tim DeKay as Judge Ephraim Raymer
- Angel Desai as Trial Judge Roberta Hines
- Kevin Dunn as Defense Attorney Keith Hollins
- Mark Feuerstein as Devon Miller
- Lawrence Gilliard Jr. as Defense Attorney Aaron Dressler
- Natalie Gold as Megan Wallace
- Zabryna Guevara as Defense Attorney Amanda Stanley
- Damon Gupton as Attorney Thorpe
- Brian Haley as Senator Alan Chandler
- Shawn Hatosy as Officer Nick Riley
- C. David Johnson as Judge Harold Leone
- John Bedford Lloyd as Jerry Ryan
- Robert Newman as Warden
- Zak Orth as Defense Attorney Harry Kagan
- Michael Park as Eric Wise
- Charles Parnell as Ezra Nichols
- Romy Rosemont as Helen Hunt
- Casey Simpson as Aaron Cole
- Catherine Mary Stewart as Victoria Chandler
- Elisabeth Waterston as Rebecca McCoy
- Lana Young as Trial Judge Mebane

== Episodes ==
No. overall	No. in season	Title	Directed by	Written by	Original release date	Prod. code	U.S viewers (millions)
467	1	"Gimme Shelter – Part Three"	Alex Hall	Rick Eid & Gwen Sigan	September 22, 2022	2201	4.69
McCoy, Price, and Maroun work on charging Sirenko. Price, Maroun, and Benson ask the girl about the other person on the boat with Sirenko. They learn it is Daniel Rublev, who is friends with Putin. Stabler and Jet take down Andre who knows about Rublev. Price and Stabler get evidence from Andre and McCoy allows Cosgrove and Shaw to arrest Rublev. Price wants to try both Sirenko and Rublev. Andre does not testify and the only other person to verify the phone video of Rublev and the two girls is the girl. Benson tries finding a relative for her and has her in a safe house. Rollins tries taking her to see Benson, but Rollins is shot. Benson moves the girl to Canada with a relative, infuriating Price, who cannot extradite her. They make a deal with Sirenko in exchange for a testimony. Stabler is infuriated, as his CI was killed by Sirenko. After Sirenko testifies, Rublev requests a deal, which Price does not accept. As they leave, Rublev is shot and killed. Sirenko's operation is rolled up, and Benson is shown to have lied about Canada, as she meets in Central Park with the girl. Note: This episode concludes a crossover event that begins on the season three premiere of Law & Order: Organized Crime and continues on the season twenty-four premiere of Law & Order: Special Victims Unit.
468	2	"Battle Lines"	Milena Govich	Art Alamo	September 29, 2022	2202	4.40
A politician's daughter is found dead, seemingly from a mugging. However as more details are uncovered, Cosgrove and Shaw begin to suspect that the crime was not random. Price makes a risky move, and Maroun works to salvage their case.
469	3	"Camouflage"	John Behring	Pamela Wechsler	October 6, 2022	2203	4.06
Cosgrove and Shaw race to find the man who shot and killed seven Asian Americans on a subway. After his arrest, Price finds himself going against his morals to pursue a federal death penalty.
470	4	"Benefit of the Doubt"	Carl Weathers	Peter Blauner	October 13, 2022	2204	4.09
Christina Watkins, the author of a scandalous exposé book, is found dead. After several leads go nowhere, Cosgrove asks for help from his former mentor, Det. Jerry Ryan who is godfather to Cosgrove's daughter Lily. The killer's MO seems to point to four previous victims, but Judge Kenneth Maldonado denies the prosecution's Molineux application for the prior bad acts. When they find a suspect, Ryan performs a rash search without a warrant, prompting a motion to suppress evidence. Price faces an uphill battle to convict, and Cosgrove has a falling out with Ryan.
471	5	"12 Seconds"	David Grossman	Jonathan Collier	October 27, 2022	2205	4.18
Law student James Pell is found murdered, but evidence is scant and motive unclear, until Cosgrove and Shaw discover that Pell has blackmailed his law professor, Ezra Nichols to secure a spot on the Law Review Board. Price and Maroun must then break through the lies told by the Nichols family to find out which of them killed Pell.
472	6	"Vicious Cycle"	Bethany Rooney	Teleplay by : Pamela Wechsler & Rick Eid; Story by : Pamela Wechsler	November 3, 2022	2206	3.73
On the night of the grand opening of his boutique, fashion designer Perry Wyatt is shot while trying to return property stolen by career criminal Keith Castillo. Cosgrove and Shaw are unable to locate the gun and witnesses to the shooting. With very little evidence, defense attorney Lara Vega uses every trick in her play book, including calling ADA Maroun as a witness for the defense. Maroun goes into her past case files to find more leverage against the defendant.
473	7	"Only the Lonely"	Elisabeth Röhm	Pamela Wechsler & Jennifer Vanderbes	November 10, 2022	2207	4.07
A hated crisis consultant is killed by a con man who makes his living by romancing affluent women and then taking hundreds of thousands of dollars from them. Price and Maroun try to bolster their case regardless of any harm it may cause to the reputation of a witness, a lawyer who has led the effort to enhance women's rights but still allowed herself to be conned by the sweet talking murderer.
474	8	"Chain of Command"	Carlos Bernard	Art Alamo & Gia Gordon	November 17, 2022	2208	4.56
A highly decorated army colonel, Alexander T. Lockett, is shot in his home. Cosgrove and Shaw track the truck used by the killer, but its owner, Shane Risner, had already committed suicide a few days earlier, leading them to Risner's funeral for their next lead, Vincent Martinez. They learn that Risner was suffering from pulmonary fibrosis, caused by burn pits during his service in Iraq. They eventually take Luke Fallon into custody. Defense attorney Erica Knight claims Fallon is not guilty by reason of mental illness or defect due to a glioblastoma brain tumor on frontal lobe as a result of toxic exposure from the burn pits. During the trial, Price and Maroun discover additional clues that help them overcome defense arguments.
475	9	"The System"	Alex Hall	Rick Eid & Pamela Wechsler	December 8, 2022	2209	4.41
After eighteen months of waiting for his day in court, suspect Troy Booker, arrested for murdering Marcus Williams, escapes police custody during an evidentiary hearing, injuring an officer in the process. Dixon enlists the Regional Fugitive Task Force, and a hostage situation ensues. As the original arresting officer, Shaw tries to talk Troy down as he struggles with a mistake he made during the original interrogation. Price also questions his own faith in the justice system, as he argues with McCoy over the correct sentence for new charges.
476	10	"Land of Opportunity"	Timothy Busfield	Art Alamo	January 5, 2023	2210	4.73
When a homeless Venezuelan migrant Luis Morales is shot dead, evidence leads Cosgrove and Shaw to a 300-million-dollar construction site, run by Eric Wise, and a cover-up of two more dead illegal workers. Price and Maroun enlist yet another illegal, Soraya Hamoud, to testify as a key witness, knowing that they risk the deportation of her and her daughter Injila back to Lebanon.
477	11	"Second Chance"	Rachel Leiterman	Pamela Wechsler & Jonathan Collier	January 12, 2023	2211	4.64
An ex-con gone legit, Derek Stanton, is beaten to death after someone vandalizes his pizzeria. After tracking down the "usual suspects" Cosgrove and Shaw arrest an unlikely culprit, Jessie Erickson, a non-violent prep-school teen who has no priors and no motive. After claiming self-defense, his attorney changes the plea to mental defect brought on by cannabis-induced psychosis, since he had bought dabs of hash oil from a dispensary that can contain up to 80-90% THC when vaping (far above the 2% norm from smoking pot leaves). McCoy argues that the legal age to buy marijuana is 21, not 18, and for good reason. Price wants to plea down from murder to manslaughter, but on the anniversary of the murder of Maroun's sister Christina, she wants a stiffer sentence; she reconsiders after visiting her mother Zara.
478	12	"Almost Famous"	Bethany Rooney	Pamela Wechsler & Jennifer Vanderbes	January 26, 2023	2212	5.38
Fourteen year-old Eli Barone is killed in a Jackass-esque home invasion stunt. Cosgrove and Shaw track down the instigator to a content house of social media influencers. When "Mad Max" reneges on his deal to testify against house manager Jason Wheeler, Price and Maroun must find former house members who have also been injured by Wheeler's exploitative greed.
479	13	"Mammon"	Joy Lane	Keith Eisner	February 2, 2023	2213	4.98
When a graduate student is found dead, Cosgrove and Shaw follow the evidence to a suspect with no clear motive. After Price and Maroun uncover a money-grabbing scheme within a church, McCoy warns them to focus on the suspects and not the institution.
480	14	"Heroes"	Alex Hall	Rick Eid	February 16, 2023	2214	4.75
After shots are fired in a popular nightclub, Cosgrove and Shaw suspect the spree was a ruse to target a sole victim. When security footage mysteriously disappears, Price and Maroun must rely on a witness who values reputation over facts.
481	15	"Fear and Loathing"	Yangzom Brauen	Teleplay by : Pamela Wechsler; Story by : Pamela Wechsler & Ajani Jackson	February 23, 2023	2215	4.71
A respected doctor is murdered. Cosgrove and Shaw try to determine motive, as it doesn't appear to be a simple mugging. When they find that several false crime alerts have been sent out through a phone application, they suspect it was racially motivated. Likewise, Shaw is profiled by two patrol officers, prompting an IAB investigation that jeopardizes Shaw's credibility in court. A financial aspect is also discovered during the trial.
482	16	"Deadline"	Martha Mitchell	Art Alamo & Gia Gordon	March 23, 2023	2216	4.41
Pulitzer Prize-winning journalist Jacob Ackerman is killed after his home is spray-painted with the word "Jew" leading Cosgrove and Shaw to assume it is a hate crime. Evidence on the paint can leads to white supremacist Lucas Hobbs but they cannot pin him for the murder. As they explore other motives, they find Ackerman and his protege reporter, Julia McAllister, were working on an unpublished report involving a prominent politician, embezzlement, and six other deaths. When defense attorney Keith Hollins successfully suppresses the murder weapon, and McAllister refuses to name her source, Price and Maroun must relay on Hobbs' eye witness testimony, even though he is currently awaiting trial for another heinous hate crime.
483	17	"Bias"	Alex Hall	Keith Eisner	March 30, 2023	2217	4.22
In a park at night, ADA Price waits to meet his friend Rachel Bender who is a public defender, but she had already been murdered there earlier in the evening. Price discovers the body, Cosgrove and Shaw respond to the call, and everyone begins questioning suspects. When they learn that a judge is involved, everyone's bias is called into question, compromising the case at trial.
484	18	"Collateral Damage"	Jean de Segonzac	Pamela Wechsler	April 6, 2023	2218	4.40
When young Ava Newhall dies from septic shock caused by an infection from a branding iron that reads Lode* detectives track down the supposed leader of a powerful cult that uses blackmail to control its members. During the trial it is revealed that they have not yet arrested the cult's true mastermind. Price and Maroun pressure cult members give up the leader they call "Lode Star."
485	19	"Private Lives"	Néstor Carbonell	Art Alamo	April 27, 2023	2219	3.92
Cosgrove and Shaw investigate the murder of a liberal physician, Dr. Ryan Bartell, whose wife Kristin is an outspoken conservative congresswoman. Kristin believes she was the intended target, but another motive is discovered that pits spouses against each other, and a father against his own child.
486	20	"Class Retreat"	Milena Govich	Teleplay by : Rick Eid & Keith Eisner; Story by : Rick Eid	May 4, 2023	2220	4.18
Respected businessman Jerome Elliot is found beaten to death near the river. The culprit is found when Cosgrove recognizes that he is from the same school as his daughter Lily. Against her wishes, Price puts her on the stand to testify. Price and Maroun disagree on the appropriate charge given the defendant's young age and lack of maturity.
487	21	"Appraisal"	Michael Pressman	Pamela Wechsler & Jennifer Vanderbes	May 11, 2023	2221	3.93
Cosgrove and Shaw are called to the scene of a bloody crime at a gallery where art dealer Madison Platt has gone missing. Later they find the body of artist Sarah Baker, who was scheduled to testify to the grand jury on a fraud case involving pension retirement funds and cryptocurrency. Price and Maroun struggle with testimony in court when the killer threatens their witness. The squad celebrates Cosgrove's 50th birthday. After Cosgrove is shot, he considers putting his papers in to take a private sector security job in Florida.
488	22	"Open Wounds"	Alex Hall	Teleplay by : Rick Eid & Pamela Wechsler; Story by : Gia Gordon & Ajani Jackson	May 18, 2023	2222	3.96
US Senator Alan Chandler, who was a swing vote against gun control, is assassinated at his daughter Nicole’s wedding. Cosgrove and Shaw track down the shooter, Derek Quinn, a teacher who survived a mass shooting at a school where dozens were casualties. McCoy gives a speech at a press conference about gun control and pursues a murder one sentence. His daughter Rebecca becomes Quinn's defense attorney and enters a plea of mental defect by reason of severe PTSD. Price empathizes with Quinn due to his own similar trauma (after the events in "Camouflage"). Cast: Final appearance of Jeffrey Donovan as Detective Frank Cosgrove. Guest starring: Sam Waterston's daughter Elisabeth as Rebecca McCoy. Note: This is the 400th episode with Sam Waterston.
