= Law & Order season 23 =

Season of American television series

Law & Order
- Season 23
- Promotional poster
- Starring: Reid Scott; Mehcad Brooks; Camryn Manheim; Hugh Dancy; Odelya Halevi; Sam Waterston; Tony Goldwyn
- No. of episodes: 13

Release
- Original network: NBC
- Original release: January 18 – May 16, 2024

Season chronology
- ← Previous; Season 22 Next → Season 24

The twenty-third season of Law & Order, an American police procedural and legal drama, premiered on NBC on January 18, 2024. The season consisted of 13 episodes, of which episode 12 was the show's milestone 500th episode.

== Cast and characters ==
=== Main ===
- Reid Scott as Junior Detective Vincent Riley
- Mehcad Brooks as Senior Detective Jalen Shaw
- Camryn Manheim as Lieutenant Kate Dixon
- Hugh Dancy as Executive Assistant District Attorney Nolan Price
- Odelya Halevi as Assistant District Attorney Samantha Maroun
- Sam Waterston as District Attorney Jack McCoy (episodes 1–5)
- Tony Goldwyn as District Attorney Nicholas Baxter (main: episodes 7–13)

=== Crossover stars from Law & Order: Special Victims Unit ===
- Robert Newman as Police Commissioner Robin Pettis

=== Recurring ===
- Bruce Altman as Mayor Robert Payne
- Connie Shi as Detective Violet Yee

=== Guest ===
- Kelly AuCoin as Alan Wallace
- Alimi Ballard as Ron Delahunt
- Rob Benedict as Scott Kelton
- Scott Bryce as Nathan Alpert
- Orlagh Cassidy as Carol Oberlin
- Alicia Coppola as Defense Attorney Audrey Keller
- Angel Desai as Trial Judge Roberta Hines
- Daryl Edwards as Trial Judge Paul Gifford
- Max von Essen as Rhett Richards
- Lawrence Gilliard Jr. as Defense Attorney Aaron Dressler
- Zabryna Guevara as Defense Attorney Amanda Stanley
- Sara Haider as Defense Attorney Wendy Stratford
- Mike Houston as Matt Walsh
- Michael Hyatt as Defense Attorney Vanessa Carter
- Željko Ivanek as Defense Attorney Charles Banks
- Lawrence Kao as Chris Wu
- Chloe Lanier as Chelsea Shell
- Kevin Makely as Domhnall Kovac
- Sam McMurray as Trial Judge Steve Nelson
- Kevyn Morrow as Trial Judge Marty Chen
- Mozhan Navabi as Stacey Dean
- Zak Orth as Defense Attorney Harry Kagan
- Silvestre Rasuk as Eddie Aguilar
- Mark Ryder as Robbie McDougall
- Suzanne Savoy as Christina Burch
- Paul Schulze as Keith Palmer
- Bradley Snedeker as Ryan Marley
- Tehmina Sunny as Kendra Nasser
- Chinaza Uche as Kenneth Cartwright
- Lana Young as Trial Judge Mebane

== Episodes ==
No. overall	No. in season	Title	Directed by	Written by	Original release date	Prod. code	U.S viewers (millions)
489	1	"Freedom of Expression"	Alex Hall	Teleplay by : Rick Eid & Pamela Wechsler; Story by : Dick Wolf & Rick Eid	January 18, 2024	2301	5.32
The president of Hudson University, Nathan Alpert, is stabbed to death and the killer leaves a "traitor" note on his body. Lt. Dixon welcomes Detective Vincent Riley to the squad, and he and Shaw track down the student responsible, leading to the founder of a Pro-Palestinian student group that produces propaganda in the wake of the October 7 attacks. Before long there are "two more bodies in the name of free speech." Cast: First appearances of Reid Scott as detective Vincent Riley. Note: Huda Fakhreddine, a professor at the University of Pennsylvania, said she believed that "Law & Order" creator Dick Wolf used her as the basis for the pro-Palestinian professor character depicted as complicit in the murder.
490	2	"Human Innovations"	Rachel Leiterman	Art Alamo	January 25, 2024	2302	4.60
Evan Marks, the CEO of tech company VenZip, is killed. Shaw and Riley track down disgruntled programmer Ben Stafford whom they believe was out for revenge for having been fired after he developed an AI to alleviate his own workload. Stafford's testimony is so compelling that Price and Maroun wonder if they can convict. Co-founder of VenZip, James Sawyer, provides video of the crime, but there is a debate on whether it is deepfake or real.
491	3	"Turn the Page"	Michael Smith	Rick Eid	February 1, 2024	2304	4.85
Celeste Clark, a young woman who frequents a sex club, is strangled and killed. In checking the police databases, Det. Violet Yee finds three more victims with the same M.O. that may point to a serial killer. One named Olivia Washington is an unsolved cold case from Riley's past. When the defense attorney uses that incident against the prosecution to bolster the defendant's innocence, Price asks Lt. Dixon for Riley's record in order to impeach him on the stand. Riley finds additional evidence that may help clear all four cases.
492	4	"Unintended Consequences"	Martha Mitchell	Pamela Wechsler & Gia Gordon	February 8, 2024	2303	4.56
Real estate agent Andrea Fenton is shot inside the home of one of her clients. Shaw and Riley question numerous suspects with no luck until Det. Yee finds a video posted online, which leads them to an unsavory witness at a security company. While the defense attorney tries to blame the victim, Price and Maroun struggle with letting one criminal walk free in order to put another away for murder.
493	5	"Last Dance"	Alex Hall	Rick Eid & Pamela Wechsler	February 22, 2024	2305	4.87
Veronica Knight, the creator of a dating app, is found early in the morning, strangled to death in Central Park. Witnesses can only point Shaw and Riley to two frequent park-goers; a street vendor with a record, and a tech billionaire with powerful political friends. Veronica's therapist can provide motive, but won't break patient confidentiality. A friend of the suspect can also provide it, but it will embarrass the Mayor if his own indiscretion is revealed in open court. McCoy sacrifices his own career to pressure the witness to tell what he knows. Cast: Final appearance of Sam Waterston as District Attorney Jack McCoy.
494	6	"On the Ledge"	David Grossman	Pamela Wechsler and Jennifer Vanderbes	February 29, 2024	2306	4.70
Shaw helps an emotionally distraught man back from the edge of suicide, and urges him to return home to his son. But he is shocked when the man becomes a suspect after an active shooter incident at a nearby hospital. To refute the defense plea of insanity by reason of racial trauma, Price must supena Shaw to force him to testify that the man was out for revenge, not out of his mind.
495	7	"Balance of Power"	Carlos Bernard	Art Alamo and Ted Malawer	March 14, 2024	2307	4.19
Jonah Barlowe, a successful investor, is murdered and millions of dollars are stolen. Shaw, Riley and Yee investigate his connections and financials to locate the killer. DA Baxter begins cleaning house, and pressures Price and Maroun to cut a deal with the killer to bring down a famous actor and ensure his first case in office is a political win. Cast: First appearance of Tony Goldwyn as District Attorney Nicholas Baxter.
496	8	"Facade"	Michael Smith	Art Alamo & Ajani Jackson	March 21, 2024	2308	3.99
Shaw and Riley investigate the strangulation death of an African-American stand-up comedian Ellis Joyner. Initial suspects include a fellow comedian, a boyfriend, and an MMA combat trainer from the Kovac Academy, run by Domhnall Kovac, who has an "88" tattoo and a history of assault charges against black men. Maroun meets with another trainer at the academy to gather more details, which prompts Baxter to meet with Police Commissioner Robin Pettis and the Deputy Commissioner of Counter-terrorism, who suspect another event similar to the January 6 insurrection might be in the works. A suspect is arrested and Baxter instructs Price to raise the charge from manslaughter to murder two. At trial, Rebecca Lasky, a witness from the subway, comes forward and paints the defendant as a hero, which jeopardizes the case.
497	9	"Family Ties"	Michael Pressman	Pamela Wechsler & Ted Malawer	April 11, 2024	2309	3.85
After testifying in a corruption case against Congressman Rhett Richards, his aide Eileen Porter is found beaten to death, and her husband is in a coma. Shaw and Riley discover someone else was living in their home at the time; Darina Meleshko, who is a surrogate for their baby girl. As a Ukrainian war refugee, defense claims insanity by reason of PTSD. Price hesitates to attack her sympathetic testimony on the stand, so Baxter and Price both admonish Maroun to step up or resign.
498	10	"Inconvenient Truth"	Alex Hall	Teleplay by : Rick Eid & Pamela Wechsler; Story by : Gia Gordon & Rick Eid & Pamela Wechsler	April 18, 2024	2310	4.51
Prominent chef Jordan Bryant is stabbed to death in his own restaurant. Shaw and Riley discover he had changed his name from Jordan Walker, after being exhonerated by DNA evidence and released from prison for a crime that hinged on an incorrect identification by an eye witness. The eye witness to the stabbing identifies Bryant's lawyer, who Bryant had claimed robbed him of 90% of his 10-million dollar settlement. New evidence is presented during the trial that causes Price to hesitate with the prosecution. The eye witness evidence is reevaluated.
499	11	"Castle in the Sky"	Milena Govich	Art Alamo	May 2, 2024	2311	3.84
Weston Berkshire, the son of a real estate magnate, is shot dead in the penthouse of an empty building his father built. Security guard Ryan Marley and his deaf daughter Alex are found to be squatters. Detectives and D.A.'s debate the merits of squatters defending their rights over property owners. Price considers dismissing the charges. Lt. Dixon and her deaf son Patrick discover more facts about the case from Alex.
500	12	"No Good Deed"	Eriq La Salle	Rick Eid	May 9, 2024	2312	3.67
Angela Hart, a therapist with many felonious clients, is found beaten, raped and murdered in her brownstone. Shaw and Riley investigate Angela's boyfriend Mark Salerno first, but another lead is a recently paroled convict, Shawn Payne who only served five years for aggravated rape under a plea bargain with ADA Price. Baxter and Price butt heads when Baxter takes over as first chair in Payne's trial. Defense attorney Vanessa Carter questions Salerno about his violent past as an alternate theory for Angela's murder. Price finds additional disturbing evidence during the trial.
501	13	"In Harm's Way"	Alex Hall	Pamela Wechsler & Jennifer Vanderbes	May 16, 2024	2313	3.68
Sports-star pitcher Matt Bennett is shot at a gala event attended by the Mayor, D.A. Nicholas Baxter, and Baxter's wife Julia and daughter Carrie. Video taken by a fan obsessed with Bennett's girlfriend, pop star Merritt Clark, shows that Nicholas was the intended target. Det. Arielle Lehane runs the gun's firing pin through NIBIN and finds a match to liquor store robber Eddie Aguilar, which leads Shaw and Riley to a Cobra 10 gang member. When the judge disallows certain evidence, siding with the defense for political reasons, Carrie Baxter provides her public testimony, even though a family secret could impact her father's re-election campaign. Cast: Final appearance of Camryn Manheim as Lieutenant Kate Dixon. Guest starring: Tony Goldwyn's daughter, Tess Goldwyn as Carrie, D.A. Baxter's daughter.

== Production ==
It was announced that Law & Order was renewed for a twenty-third season on April 10, 2023. Production on this season was delayed due to the 2023 Writers Guild of America strike and subsequent joint 2023 SAG-AFTRA strike, the writers' rooms for the Law & Order franchise did not return until after a deal was struck with the Writers Guild in October 2023. It was announced that Rick Eid was returning as showrunner/executive producer and once SAG-AFTRA struck a deal, allowing actors to return to work; production would begin on the show the week after Thanksgiving, which put NBC setting the premiere date for January 18, 2024. Due to the longevity of the strikes, NBC cut the episode number of the season down from twenty-two episodes to thirteen.

=== Cast changes ===
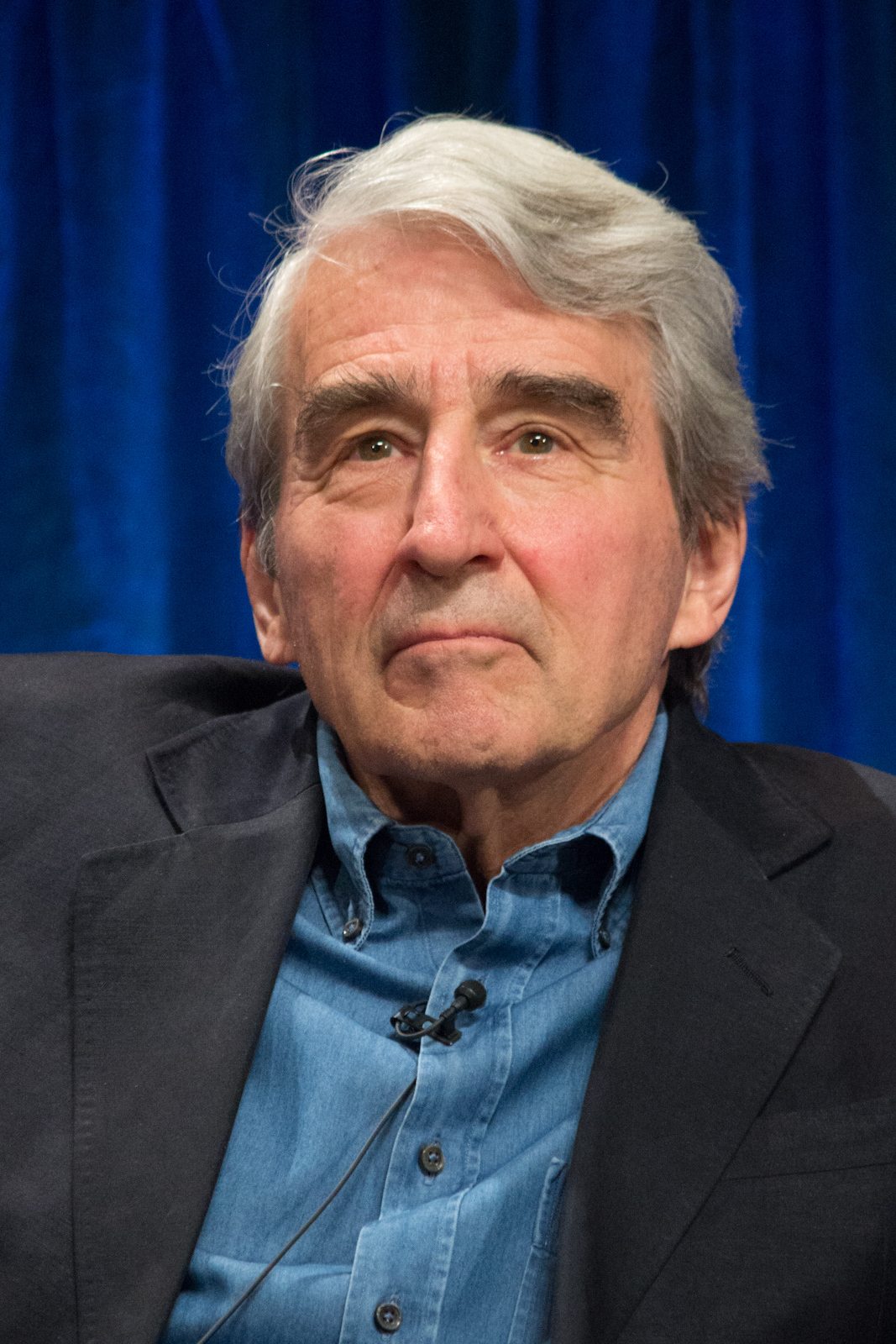
Sam Waterston (pictured) has appeared in 405 credited episodes on the flagship series alone. He also portrayed McCoy in: the TV movie Exiled, had two crossover appearances on Homicide: Life on the Street, and on spinoff series SVU (4 episodes) and Trial by Jury (2 episodes).

Two weeks before production was set to begin on this season, it was announced on November 15, 2023, that star Jeffrey Donovan (Detective Frank Cosgrove) would not be returning to the series, that he was "let go due for creative reasons". This put the show looking to find someone to fill the role. On November 22, 2023, Reid Scott (of Veep fame) would be joining the cast in place of Donovan, later revealed to be portraying Detective Vincent Riley. At NBC's red carpet event celebrating Law & Order: Special Victims Unit’s twenty-fifth-season premiere, Mehcad Brooks (Detective Jalen Shaw) spoke with TV Line and said of working with Scott and his character,

"We're expanding on a lot of the tit-for-tat relationship, the quick New York quips. Reid brings a very youthful energy to the role, and I think you have two guys in the same generation who aren't so different because they're from different generations, but they're different because they have different perspectives to life . . . There's enough camaraderie, and there's enough trust that's gained and earned that you believe this relationship. I think that there's enough similarities between these two characters where you see them as potential best friends. But you don't earn that too quickly."

Scott had never appeared on the flagship series nor any of its spin-offs, but he always wanted to as far back as his early 20s. In a March 2024 interview with Town & Country he reveals how he saw the role come about for him, that it initially started when he saw the news that Donovan had gone from the show,

"I would need several mental health days if I went down the wrong Deadline rabbit hole. So I just don't, and for whatever reason, this one day I did. The first article I see was Jeffrey Donovan leaving Law & Order. And I don't know why, I just had this lightning bolt, like, 'Oh, they're going to come after me.' And then I moved on with my day and I didn't even think. I didn't mention it to anybody. I didn't say anything about it. I put it out of my head."

Three days later Scott got a call from his agent/manager who told him about the sudden opportunity, before they even began to explain it, he guessed, "Is it Law & Order? Scott continued, "Not only am I scratching this itch from 20 plus years ago, but also, it's just fun to run around the streets of New York with a gun, a badge, and a bad attitude."

"Greetings, you wonderful people. It's a pleasure to talk directly like this to the backbone of Law & Order's absolutely amazing audience. The time has come for me to move on and take Jack McCoy with me. There's sadness in leaving, but I'm just too curious about what's next. An actor doesn't want to let himself get too comfortable. I'm more grateful to you than I can say. L&O's continuing and amazing long run, along with its astounding comeback, is all thanks to you and Dick Wolf, but for whose vision, patience, perseverance, and unique combination of creative and business talents, none of this would have happened. I feel very blessed. I hope to see you all on the flip side."

— Sam Waterston's exit statement to viewers.

On the afternoon of February 2, 2024, it was announced that after almost thirty years and over four-hundred episodes of portraying the character Jack McCoy, that Sam Waterston would be departing the series. And that subsequently, Tony Goldwyn (whose recent credits include Scandal) would be joining as the new district attorney, Nicholas Baxter. Waterston also released a statement to long-time viewers during the announcement of his departure from the series.

Long-time Law & Order franchise executive producer and Wolf Entertainment president/Chief Operating Officer Peter Jankowski said long-time cast members like Waterston, SVU's Mariska Hargitay, and Organized Crime's Chris Meloni have been invaluable in setting the tone on set over the years, "There are all these incredible artists who also are tremendous leaders," he told The Hollywood Reporter, "You can't make shows without people like that." Waterston's last episode, "Last Dance," aired on February 22, 2024, on NBC.

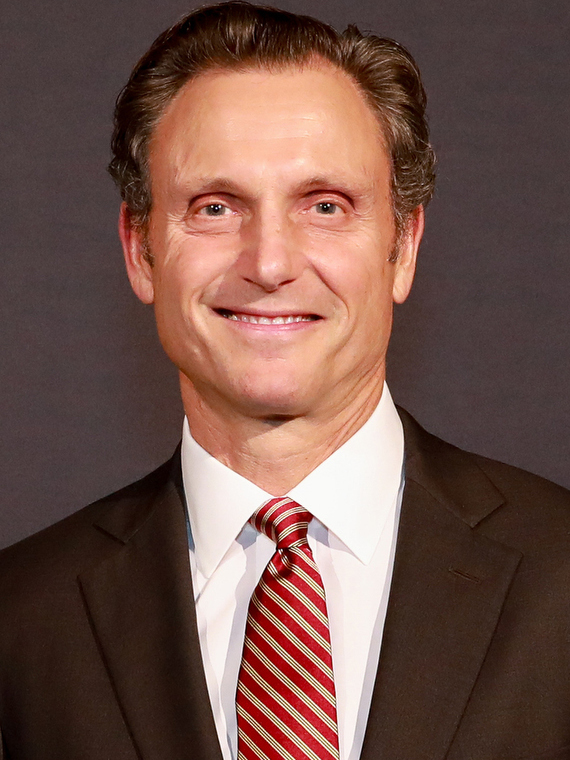
Tony Goldwyn (pictured) appeared two times in both seasons six and seven of Law & Order: Criminal Intent as Frank Goren, subsequently deceased brother of Detective Robert Goren (Vincent D'Onofrio). Goldwyn also directed the season sixteen episode, "Thinking Makes It So".

Waterston, in an appearance on Today that aired the day before his last episode was set to air on NBC, stated on shooting his last scene, "When they said goodbye to me, the last shot that I did was on the set of the courtroom and Dick Wolf showed up and everybody gave speeches. And I quoted from Abraham Lincoln, going to D.C. at the beginning of the Civil War — that he had been there for 25 years. If 25 years doesn't matter, nothing matters." Waterston also displayed confidence in Tony Goldwyn taking over the district attorney role, "I think he's going to be great. I think my reputation is in terrible danger because I think just he's going to be wonderful and I'll be watching. It's going to be big trouble. It'll be what the DA is, demanding and a lot of fun to watch."

In an interview with The Wrap, Goldwyn noted that his character isn't any way similar to his predecessor,

"Jack McCoy was really Atticus Finch, a purist about the law. The law is the law is the law, and that decides everything. I think Nick Baxter takes a much more holistic view towards the office. He's a politician, and a very experienced and good lawyer. I think he views his function as part of a system and takes in societal concerns, and what the broader impacts and longer impacts of every decision. Gray is the primary color in our justice system, so you have to figure out through what lens you're going to make your decisions."

On March 19, 2024, Goldwyn elaborated further on who his character's inspiration is from with Today,

"I wouldn't say that [...] I'm modeling him after anyone in particular. I've always been fascinated with the criminal justice system. I'm on the board of an incredible organization called the Innocence Project, which is at the forefront of criminal justice reform in this country and has pioneered the use of DNA evidence to free the wrongfully convicted — which we're actually doing a show about now. We're filming it, so you'll see that soon."

Goldwyn's first episode is "Balance of Power," which aired March 14, 2024 on NBC.

On May 10, 2024, it was announced that Camryn Manheim (Lieutenant Kate Dixon) would be departing the series at the end of this season. In a statement to Variety, creator Dick Wolf said, "I thank Camryn for her three wonderful seasons helping us relaunch ‘Law & Order.‘ She is a class act, and I wish her nothing but the best for her next chapter."

Following the news of her exit announcement, Manheim took to her Instagram to address it, with the caption stating,

"I had the most incredible experience being a part of the Law & Order Universe, and more importantly the Wolfpack. I'm so thankful for the three wonderful seasons that I spent with this wildly talented cast of merry pranksters. Mehcad Brooks, Reid Scott, Connie Shi, Anthony Anderson, Jeffrey Donovan, Hugh Dancy, Odelya Halevi, Tony Goldwyn and Sam Waterston. Not to mention the stellar guest stars that came in and out of the studio doors. . . . I loved showing up for work each and every day, loved keeping the boys in line at Precinct 27 and most importantly, loved spending time with the most hard working, professional and kindhearted crew. They are truly New York's finest."

Her last episode is the season finale episode, "In Harm's Way," which originally aired May 16, 2024 on NBC.
