= Law & Order season 21 =

Season of American television series

Law & Order
- Season 21
- Promotional poster
- Starring: Anthony Anderson; Jeffrey Donovan; Camryn Manheim; Hugh Dancy; Odelya Halevi; Sam Waterston
- No. of episodes: 10

Release
- Original network: NBC
- Original release: February 24 – May 19, 2022

Season chronology
- ← Previous; Season 20 Next → Season 22

The twenty-first season of Law & Order, an American police procedural and legal drama, was ordered by NBC on September 28, 2021, over a decade after its original cancellation on May 24, 2010. The season began airing on February 24, 2022, as a mid-season replacement during the 2021–2022 broadcast season. Due to such status, the season consists of only 10 episodes. In May 2022, the series was renewed for a twenty-second season.

Anthony Anderson and Sam Waterston returned in their roles of Kevin Bernard and Jack McCoy, respectively; and were joined by new cast members Jeffrey Donovan, Camryn Manheim, Hugh Dancy and Odelya Halevi. Series creator Dick Wolf returned as an executive producer, while Rick Eid was named showrunner. The series is produced by Wolf Entertainment and Universal Television.

== Cast and characters ==
=== Main ===
- Anthony Anderson as Senior Detective Kevin Bernard
- Jeffrey Donovan as Junior Detective Frank Cosgrove
- Camryn Manheim as Lieutenant Kate Dixon
- Hugh Dancy as Executive Assistant District Attorney Nolan Price
- Odelya Halevi as Assistant District Attorney Samantha Maroun
- Sam Waterston as District Attorney Jack McCoy

=== Crossover stars from Law & Order: Special Victims Unit ===
- Mariska Hargitay as Captain Olivia Benson
- Terry Serpico as Chief Tommy McGrath

=== Recurring ===
- Michael Beach as Defense Attorney Brian Harris
- Shayvawn Webster as Detective Dani Vertiz

=== Notable guests ===
- Lisa Arrindell as Veronica King
- Dylan Baker as Defense Attorney Sanford Rems
- Richard H. Blake as Chris Wood
- Marsha Stephanie Blake Defense Attorney Erica Knight
- David Dean Bottrell as Dr. Patrick Grady
- Benjamin Brown as Mayor
- J. Bernard Calloway as Attorney Marcus Wallace
- Christian Campbell as Ethan Merritt
- Josh Clark as Grant Fisher
- Alicia Coppola as Defense Attorney Audrey Keller
- Nathan Darrow as Scott Gleacher
- Angel Desai as Judge Roberta Hines
- Tate Ellington as Colin Baker
- Maury Ginsberg as Defense Attorney Scott Quinn
- Darren Goldstein as John Richardson
- Carlos Gomez as Mark Mendez
- Currie Graham as Kyle Swanson
- Zach Grenier as Ed Zanini
- Zabryna Guevara as Defense Attorney Amanda Stanley
- Patrick Heusinger as Wyatt Ackman
- Rikki Klieman as Judge Deakin
- Rachelle Lefevre as Nina Ellis
- Norm Lewis as Henry King
- Carey Lowell as Assistant District Attorney Jamie Ross
- Kevin Mambo as Tom McDaniel
- Jeffrey Nordling as Jordan Reed
- Jack Noseworthy as Senator Jack Newman
- Christopher Randolph as Judge Linder
- Deborah Rennard as Audrey White
- Marcel Simoneau as Ryan Bell
- Bonnie Somerville as Mrs Richardson
- Francie Swift as Diana Marcus
- Jessica Tuck as Clara Newhall
- Jade Wu as Judge Carol Ward

== Episodes ==
No. overall	No. in season	Title	Directed by	Written by	Original release date	Prod. code	U.S viewers (millions)
457	1	"The Right Thing"	Jean de Segonzac	Dick Wolf & Rick Eid	February 24, 2022	2101	5.80
458	2	"Impossible Dream"	Michael Pressman	Teleplay by : Rick Eid; Story by : Pamela Wechsler & Rick Eid	March 3, 2022	2102	4.46
Note: This episode was inspired by the trial of Elizabeth Holmes.
459	3	"Filtered Life"	Milena Govich	Art Alamo & Pamela Wechsler	March 10, 2022	2103	4.21
460	4	"Fault Lines"	Heather Cappiello	Pamela Wechsler & Art Alamo	March 17, 2022	2104	4.62
Note: This episode inspired by the Britney Spears conservatorship dispute.
461	5	"Free Speech"	Alex Hall	Rick Eid	April 7, 2022	2105	3.91
462	6	"Wicked Game"	Alex Hall	Teleplay by : Rick Eid; Story by : Pamela Wechsler & Art Alamo	April 14, 2022	2106	4.02
463	7	"Legacy"	Sarah Boyd	Pamela Wechsler	April 28, 2022	2107	4.15
464	8	"Severance"	Yangzom Brauen	Art Alamo	May 5, 2022	2108	4.23
Bernard and Cosgrove investigate the disappearance of a social media star whose case takes the internet by storm; Price and Maroun must weigh their decisions regarding the case against the wishes of the missing woman's family.
465	9	"The Great Pretender"	Alex Hall	Rick Eid & Pamela Wechsler	May 12, 2022	2109	3.83
Bernard and Cosgrove identify a murder victim who posed as a larcenous socialite, Ella Whitlock. Her killer, Wyatt Ackman, takes a plea to testify against his uncle, Charles Ackman, CEO of Northwestern Pharma, who is charged in the death of an oxycodone overdose victim. Price's personal bias and Maroun's compromising enabling of Wyatt, are also questioned. Note: Inspired by news articles and lawsuits about the production and manipulation of the oxycodone market by the Sackler family.
466	10	"Black and Blue"	Eriq La Salle	Rick Eid	May 19, 2022	2110	3.94
Cast: Final appearance of Anthony Anderson as Detective Kevin Bernard.

== Production ==
=== Development ===
The prospect of reviving Law & Order for a twenty-first season first came about in the more immediate wake of its cancellation, with talks falling through with TNT and AMC. In February 2015, it was reported that NBC was eyeing a limited series of 10 episodes. However, it never made it to active development. In July 2021, NBC scrapped Law & Order: For the Defense, a planned spinoff in the franchise they had ordered straight to series the previous May, and scheduled to lead a Thursday schedule entirely occupied by the franchise, with Special Victims Unit and Organized Crime. It was stated at the time that in its stead new spinoffs were being developed.

On September 28, 2021, NBC officially renewed the show. Despite being billed as a twenty-first season, NBC gave it the same "straight to series" order they gave For the Defense, which is typically used only for new series. Series creator Dick Wolf returned as an executive producer. Wolf signed an overall deal with NBC and Universal Television in 2020 that will keep him at the network through 2025. In December 2019, Wolf had asked former showrunner René Balcer to return to run the show again, but Balcer declined. Wolf then asked other former Law & Order showrunners to take the helm, but they also declined. Finally, Rick Eid stepped down as showrunner of Chicago P.D. to take over showrunning duties of Law & Order. (Note: Eid was an executive producer and the incumbent showrunner on Chicago P.D. and FBI, both which share a fictional universe with the Law & Order franchise. All three franchisees are produced by Wolf Entertainment and Universal Television) Eid became an executive producer during the season and retains that role on Chicago P.D. as well. Arthur Forney and Peter Jankowski will also serve as executive producers. Production on the season began on December 8, 2021. On May 10, 2022, the series was renewed for a twenty-second season.

=== Casting ===
On November 1, 2021, Jeffrey Donovan was cast as a series regular to portray a New York Police Department detective. At that time it was also reported that Sam Waterston and Anthony Anderson, who starred in earlier seasons of the series, and additional former cast members were also in talks to return. Waterston previously stated in 2015 that he would be open to returning. Other previous cast members S. Epatha Merkerson, Jeremy Sisto and Alana de la Garza hold starring roles on Chicago Med and FBI, series that both exist within the same fictional universe and are produced by Wolf Entertainment. On November 23, 2021, it was announced that Hugh Dancy had been cast as an Assistant District Attorney and that Anderson had signed a one-year deal to return as Detective Kevin Bernard. On December 10, 2021, it was revealed that Camryn Manheim had been cast as Lieutenant Kate Dixon, the successor to Merkerson's character Lieutenant Anita Van Buren. Manheim portrayed minor characters in previous seasons of the series. On December 15, 2021, Odelya Halevi was announced to be joining the cast as Assistant District Attorney Samantha Maroun. A day later, Waterston was announced to have finalized a one-year deal to return as District Attorney Jack McCoy. Anderson was confirmed not to be continuing beyond his one year on May 26, 2022.

Carey Lowell who portrayed Jamie Ross from 1996 to 2001, and crossed over into Trial by Jury, appeared as a guest star in the season premiere. Dylan Baker also appeared as Sanford Rems, a character he played from 2004 to 2006. Mariska Hargitay made a guest appearance as her SVU character, Olivia Benson, in the season finale.

== Release ==
When announced, it was unclear whether the season would air in the 2021–22 or 2022–23 television season; it was later reported that it would premiere as a mid-season replacement on February 24, 2022. It aired in the 8 PM Thursday timeslot that For the Defense had been scheduled for, alongside SVU and Organized Crime.
