= Losing Control =

- Theatrical release poster
- Directed by: Valerie Weiss
- Written by: Valerie Weiss
- Produced by: Robert A. Johnson; Matthew Medlin; Alyssa Weisberg; Valerie Weiss
- Cinematography: Jamie Urman
- Edited by: Robin Katz
- Music by: John Swihart
- Production company: Ph.D. Productions
- Release date: April 2, 2011 (Vail Film Festival)
- Running time: 91 minutes
- Country: United States
- Language: English

Losing Control is a 2011 American romantic comedy film written, produced and directed by Valerie Weiss. Losing Control was released theatrically on March 23, 2012 in New York City and expanded to more cities on March 30, 2012. The film won Best Director at the 2011 Feel Good Film Festival, Connie Clair Spirit Award for Top Female Filmmaker of 2011 at The Chicago Comedy Film Festival and First Honorable Mention for the Christopher Wetzel Independent Film Comedy Award.

== Plot ==
A female scientist wants proof that her boyfriend is "the one."

== Cast ==
- Miranda Kent as Samantha
- Reid Scott as Ben
- Kathleen Robertson as Leslie
- Theo Alexander as Maurizio
- Steve Howey as Terry
- John Billingsley as Prof. Straub
- Sumalee Montano as Breanna Lee
- Bitsie Tulloch as Trudy
- Alanna Ubach as Alora
- Neil Hopkins as Scott Foote
- Lin Shaye as Dolores
- Ben Weber as Dr. Rudy Mann
- Jamison Yang as Chen Wa
- Barry Gordon as Frank
- Elise Jackson as Vivienne
- Sam Ball as Tantric Sam
- True Bella Pinci as Little Samantha

== Critical reception ==
The film received mixed reviews. On the website metacritic, the film received a 33 out of 100, indicating "generally unfavorable" reviews.

From Calum Marsh, in Slant Magazine:

. The film, in its defense, is far too vacuous to be accused of having any kind of agenda—it just happens to get its politics wrong along with everything else. We're told that Losing Control is "loosely based on Weiss's own experiences," but it would be more accurate to say that it's heavily based on Weiss's own experiences watching terrible movies.

From John Anderson, in Variety:

You can't lose what you never had, and while "Losing Control" is a thoroughly likable, playful comedy, there's never a sense that writer-director Valerie Weiss is in total command of film's tone, pacing or comic content, which is considerable.

From Steven Rea in The Philadelphia Inquirer:

Losing Control nicely mixes comedic absurdity with weightier career vs. commitment themes.
