= Who Invited Charlie? =

- Directed by: Xavier Manrique
- Written by: Nicholas Schutt
- Produced by: Jason Dubin; Nicholas Schutt; Xavier Manrique; Reid Scott
- Starring: Reid Scott; Jordana Brewster; Adam Pally
- Distributed by: Vertical Entertainment
- Release dates: October 8, 2022 (Hamptons); February 3, 2023 (United States)
- Running time: 101 minutes
- Country: United States
- Language: English

Who Invited Charlie? (formerly titled Charlie In The Pandemic) is a 2022 American comedy film written by Nicholas Schutt, directed by Xavier Manrique and starring Reid Scott, Jordana Brewster and Adam Pally.

== Plot ==
While having lunch at a restaurant, Phil's girlfriend Jess walks out on him saying they're done. He pursues her outside, but runs into a Christmas parade and accidentally strikes an elf. In the scuffle that follows, he loses his wallet, which is picked up by his friend Charlie. Later, Phil shares a drink with Charlie at a bar, who insists that he noticed but didn't pick up Phil's wallet. They also meet Trey, a former partner of Phil who is now his competitor.

The COVID-19 pandemic is in full swing beginning early 2020, when hand sanitizers are used every day, and people don't even shake hands due to fear of spreading germs. Phil is now routinely working from home via Zoom calls, and his paranoid son Max is trying to get the attention of a girl, Annie, using Instagram. One night, pebbles hit Phil's bedroom window, and it turns out to be Charlie. He claims to have found Phil's wallet and demands he be allowed to stay at the home, reminding Phil about being aware of his girlfriend. Since Phil doesn't want his wife Rosie to know about his affair, Charlie starts living there with a designated area and a room for him to live in.

Charlie smokes weed and becomes acquaintances with the neighbor Emma. Meanwhile, Max enters Charlie's room and snoops around his stuff, but gets caught by Charlie, though Max was eventually forgiven. Max asks Charlie how he could effortlessly talk to Emma, and confesses an interest in Annie. Charlie suggests Max present a new side of him that Annie hasn't seen, and construct a meme. Max creates a meme and posts it online with Charlie's approval. Soon Annie comments on the meme, to Max's delight. Max and Charlie then take a truck out on a drive to the beach, when Charlie allows Max to smoke his weed. Later back home, they have fun singing and playing the guitar.

Phil starts drinking and proclaims that he is in trouble as Trey is poaching his clients, and Charlie reveals that he works as a gym teacher at a middle school. During dinner with family, Phil confesses to Rosie that he might lose his business. The next day, all four go hiking, when Charlie mistakenly divulges to Max about his father's girlfriend. Max grows angry and drives the truck to the beach, and reveals to Phil about the affair. Rosie doesn't seem shocked at the revelation and admits that she knew about Phil's girlfriend, but discloses that she slept with Trey for revenge.

Rosie packs her bags and leaves for her brother's place as Charlie and Phil yell at each other. Unbeknownst to all three of them, Max catches a bus by himself. Phil discovers Max is missing and pays a visit to Rosie. Together they go to see Charlie, believing that Max would be with him. Phil finally finds Charlie, who reveals that his wife Sarah died recently. When Charlie hears that Max is missing, he surmises that Max might have gone to a party in Dumbo. At the party, they see Max's crush Annie who points in the direction that Max was last headed. Charlie, Phil and Rosie finally find Max standing by the East River near the Brooklyn Bridge. Charlie speaks to Max, who says he had a panic attack. All four are relieved after being reunited.

Back home, Max is willing to go to boarding school, but gets permission to come home if it feels too weird. Phil acknowledges his mistake to Rosie and agrees to go to therapy, whereupon Rosie is willing to give their marriage a chance.

Emma and Charlie chat again, and she invites him into her home.

== Cast ==
- Reid Scott as Phil
- Jordana Brewster as Rosie
- Adam Pally as Charlie
- Dylan Penn as Jess
- Xosha Roquemore as Emma
- Peter Dager as Max

== Production ==
In November 2021, it was announced that Scott, Brewster, Pally and Penn were cast in the film. In December 2021, it was announced that Roquemore and Dager were cast in the film.

The film was shot in New York and the Hamptons.

== Release ==
The film premiered at the Hamptons International Film Festival on October 8, 2022. Then it was released in theaters and on demand on February 3, 2023.

== Reception ==
The film has a 71% rating on Rotten Tomatoes based on seven reviews. Emily Bernard of Collider graded the film a B+ and wrote, "Pally wastes no time in reminding us that he’s one of the wittiest and most dynamic comedic actors working, gifting us with a performance that’s both playful and shrouded in a shadow of sadness." Will Sayre of MovieWeb gave the film a positive review and wrote, "Talented stars brings their A-game to this laugh-out-loud effort that effectively captures the pandemic's early days."
