= Law & Order =

American television series (1990–2010, 2022–present)

- The typeface used in the series title card, Friz Quadrata, is used in the identifying sign of 1 Police Plaza, headquarters of the NYPD.
- Genre: Police procedural; Legal drama; Mystery
- Created by: Dick Wolf
- Showrunners: Walon Green; Michael S. Chernuchin; René Balcer; William M. Finkelstein; Arthur Penn; Barry Schindel; Nicholas Wootton; Rick Eid
- Starring: George Dzundza; Chris Noth; Dann Florek; Michael Moriarty; Richard Brooks; Steven Hill; Paul Sorvino; Carolyn McCormick; Jerry Orbach; S. Epatha Merkerson; Jill Hennessy; Sam Waterston; Benjamin Bratt; Carey Lowell; Angie Harmon; Jesse L. Martin; Dianne Wiest; Elisabeth Röhm; Fred Dalton Thompson; Dennis Farina; Annie Parisse; Michael Imperioli; Milena Govich; Alana de la Garza; Jeremy Sisto; Linus Roache; Anthony Anderson; Jeffrey Donovan; Camryn Manheim; Hugh Dancy; Odelya Halevi; Mehcad Brooks; Reid Scott; Tony Goldwyn; Maura Tierney; David Ajala; James Badge Dale
- Theme music composer: Mike Post
- Opening theme: "Theme of Law & Order"
- Country of origin: United States
- Original language: English
- No. of seasons: 26
- No. of episodes: 550 (list of episodes)

Production
- Executive producers: Dick Wolf; Joseph Stern; Ed Sherin; Peter Jankowski; Matthew Penn; Fred Berner; Arthur W. Forney
- Producers: Lorenzo Carcaterra; Aaron Zelman; Nick Santora; Lois Johnson; Greg Plageman; Christopher Ambrose
- Camera setup: Single-camera
- Running time: 40–48 minutes
- Production companies: Wolf Entertainment; Universal Television (Note: Credited as Studios USA Television (1998–2002) (seasons 9–12), Universal Network Television (2002–2004) (seasons 13 & 14), NBC Universal Television Studio (2004–2007) (seasons 15–17), and Universal Media Studios (2008–2010) (seasons 18–20).)

Original release
- Network: NBC
- Release: September 13, 1990 – May 24, 2010
- Release: February 24, 2022 – present

Related
- Law & Order (franchise)

Law & Order is an American police procedural and legal drama television series created by Dick Wolf and produced by Wolf Entertainment and Universal Television, launching the Law & Order franchise.

Law & Order aired its entire run on NBC, premiering on September 13, 1990, and completing its 20th season on May 24, 2010. On September 28, 2021, after an 11-year hiatus, NBC announced that the series would be revived for a 21st season, which premiered on February 24, 2022. The revival saw the debut of new regular cast members, and the reprise of two roles by series veterans: District Attorney Jack McCoy (Sam Waterston), and Detective Kevin Bernard (Anthony Anderson). Afterwards, the series was renewed for three additional seasons. The twenty-fifth season premiered on September 25, 2025. In May 2026, the series was renewed for its twenty-sixth season, which premiered on October 8 of the same year.

Set and filmed in New York City, the series follows a two-part approach: the first half hour is the investigation of a crime (usually murder) and apprehension of a suspect by New York City Police Department homicide detectives, while the second half is the prosecution of the defendant by the Manhattan district attorney's office. Plots are based on real cases that recently made headlines, although the motivation for the crime and the perpetrator may be much different. The show started using revolving door casting in season two. The progression of the record for longest serving main cast members of the series is: Jerry Orbach as Detective Lennie Briscoe, S. Epatha Merkerson as Lieutenant Anita Van Buren and Sam Waterston as Executive Assistant District Attorney/District Attorney Jack McCoy.

Law & Order's twenty-five seasons are second only to its spin-off Law & Order: Special Victims Unit (1999–present) for the longest-running live action scripted American primetime series. The success of the series has led to the creation of additional shows, making Law & Order a franchise, including a television film, several video games, and international adaptations of the series. It has won and has been nominated for numerous awards over the years, including a number of Primetime Emmy Awards.

== Plot ==
In the criminal justice system, the people are represented by two separate yet equally important groups: the police who investigate crime, and the district attorneys who prosecute the offenders. These are their stories.

— Opening narration, spoken by Steven Zirnkilton.

Episodes of Law & Order follow a distinctive two-part format, separated by a transition at the midpoint. The first half focuses on the police investigation, while the second follows the prosecution as the case moves through the criminal justice system. Character backstories and personal lives are kept to a minimum, allowing each episode to remain primarily case-driven.

Most episodes begin with a cold open in which a crime, usually a homicide, is discovered. These openings typically portray an ordinary moment in New York City before civilians unexpectedly discover a body or witness a crime. During the first two seasons, crimes were more commonly discovered by uniformed patrol officers. In later seasons, some episodes instead opened with brief scenes depicting the victim's final moments, a style later popularized by Law & Order: Criminal Intent.

=== Police investigation ===
The police portion follows detectives assigned to the New York City Police Department's 27th Precinct Homicide Unit. Although homicide investigations form the core of the series, earlier seasons occasionally featured kidnappings, rapes, and other serious crimes before the launch of Law & Order: Special Victims Unit. In reality, many of these cases would typically be handled by specialist investigative units.

Each detective team usually consists of a senior detective, an experienced investigator, and a junior detective, who brings a different perspective while learning from their partner. They report to a lieutenant or captain, who oversees the investigation and provides strategic guidance.

Upon arriving at the crime scene, detectives are briefed by the first responding officers or Crime Scene Unit (CSU) personnel. During their initial examination, they begin forming theories, questioning witnesses, and often exchange brief observations or dry humour before the opening credits.

Investigations begin at the crime scene, where CSU technicians collect fingerprints, DNA, trace evidence, footwear impressions, ballistic evidence, bloodstain patterns, and other forensic material for comparison against potential suspects. Medical Examiners examine the victim and determine the cause, manner, and approximate time of death through an autopsy. Their findings frequently redirect the investigation or eliminate early theories.

Detectives must often identify the victim, notify next of kin, establish timelines, examine relationships, and search for possible motives while following numerous dead ends before locating a viable suspect.

Throughout the investigation, detectives interview witnesses, question suspects, review CCTV footage, analyse mobile phone records and GPS data through the Technical Assistance Response Unit (TARU), and coordinate with other NYPD units when required. Evidence is submitted to crime laboratories including fingerprints, DNA, toxicology, and ballistic analysis, while background investigations provide further insight into victims and suspects. When appropriate, detectives consult psychologists, psychiatrists, or other specialists to better understand offender behaviour or potential mental health issues.

Detectives keep their commanding officer informed throughout the investigation. Once sufficient evidence has been gathered, search and arrest warrants are obtained, often in consultation with the prosecutors. Arrests frequently culminate in dramatic confrontations or foot pursuits before suspects are advised of their Miranda rights and questioned. Interrogations typically end with a confession, a request for legal counsel, or the suspect invoking their right to remain silent.

=== Legal proceedings ===
The second half shifts to the New York County (Manhattan) District Attorney's Office. Cases are prosecuted by an Executive Assistant District Attorney (EADA) and an Assistant District Attorney (ADA), who work under the elected District Attorney. Unlike most courtroom dramas, Law & Order presents legal proceedings almost entirely from the prosecution's perspective.

The ADA usually first appears during the defendant's arraignment, where charges are formally presented and the defendant enters a plea, most commonly "not guilty." Bail conditions are then determined by the court. Occasionally, prosecutors become involved earlier by advising detectives on warrants, charging decisions, or plea negotiations.

Some cases require presentation before a grand jury to determine whether sufficient evidence exists to issue an indictment. Grand jury proceedings may involve witness testimony, subpoenas, and the presentation of physical evidence.

Plea bargaining is a recurring feature of the series. Prosecutors and defence attorneys negotiate possible agreements while weighing the strength of the evidence, the seriousness of the offence, and the wishes of victims' families. Although many negotiations fail, new evidence or legal developments can alter both sides' positions.

Before trial, prosecutors prepare witnesses, organise evidence, conduct legal research, and occasionally request further investigative work from detectives. They also argue pre-trial motions concerning the admissibility of evidence or witness testimony.

Trials generally follow a traditional courtroom structure, beginning with opening statements, followed by witness examinations, cross-examinations, objections, expert testimony, closing arguments, jury deliberations, and finally the verdict. Crime scene investigators, forensic scientists, medical examiners, psychologists, and other expert witnesses frequently play significant roles, particularly when the defence raises issues such as diminished responsibility or insanity.

Many episodes examine wider legal, political, and ethical issues, including euthanasia, abortion, gun control, capital punishment, corporate responsibility, and civil liberties, which influence both courtroom strategy and the personal convictions of those involved.

=== Resolution ===
Episodes usually conclude with the jury delivering its verdict or the parties reaching a final plea agreement. Convicted defendants are led from the courtroom in custody, while acquitted defendants leave with their families. The reactions of victims' relatives, detectives, prosecutors, and defence attorneys often underscore the emotional consequences of the outcome.

Rather than ending on a triumphant note, many episodes close with a reflective conversation between the prosecutors, exploring the legal, moral, or ethical questions raised by the case. Occasionally, the ultimate truth or justice of the outcome remains deliberately ambiguous, allowing viewers to draw their own conclusions.

== "Ripped from the headlines" ==
Law & Order episodes are often advertised as being "ripped from the headlines", a slogan that refers to the franchise's practice of conceiving stories that are partially inspired by recent headlines. There might be a few scenes that resemble a well-known headline, while the majority of the episode goes in a different direction, or there could be one character that is based on a famous individual, but the circumstances the person encounters are largely fictional, and the rest of the plot usually diverges significantly from the actual events that may have inspired the episode. This "ripped from the headlines" theme is reflected in the opening credits sequence that evolves from newspaper halftones to high-resolution photos. Advertisements of episodes with close real-life case parallels often use the "ripped from the headlines" phrase, although a textual disclaimer, within the actual episode, emphasizes that the story and characters are fictional.

Some real-life crime victims have felt used and exploited, with one lawyer, Ravi Batra, going so far as to sue the show in 2004 for libel with regard to the season 14 episode "Floater", which portrayed a lawyer with a similar name and the distinctive features of Batra. Batra and the show later settled out of court for an unspecified amount.

In some cases, cast and crew have received threats because of cases covered in the show. In 1991, the show aired the episode "Troubles" inspired by the Irish Republican Army. Shortly after the episode aired, creator Dick Wolf received a letter saying "Since you're reading this letter, you know that we know where you live."

== Episodes ==
| Season | Episodes | Originally released | | Rank | Avg. rating (Note: In households; seasons 1–7)/ Avg. viewers (Note: In millions; seasons 8–20) |
| Season | Episodes | First released | Last released | Rank | Avg. rating/ Avg. viewers |
|---|---|---|---|---|---|
| 1 | 22 | September 13, 1990 | June 9, 1991 | #46 | 12.1 |
| 2 | 22 | September 17, 1991 | May 12, 1992 | #46 | 12.3 |
| 3 | 22 | September 23, 1992 | May 19, 1993 | #56 | 10.2 |
| 4 | 22 | September 15, 1993 | May 25, 1994 | #38 | 11.9 |
| 5 | 23 | September 21, 1994 | May 24, 1995 | #27 | 11.6 |
| 6 | 23 | September 20, 1995 | May 22, 1996 | #24 | 10.9 |
| 7 | 23 | September 18, 1996 | May 21, 1997 | #27 | 10.5 |
| 8 | 24 | September 24, 1997 | May 20, 1998 | #24 | 14.1 |
| 9 | 24 | September 23, 1998 | May 26, 1999 | #20 | 13.8 |
| Film | 1 | November 8, 1998 | | —N/a | 17.9 |
| 10 | 24 | September 22, 1999 | May 24, 2000 | #13 | 16.3 |
| 11 | 24 | October 18, 2000 | May 23, 2001 | #11 | 17.7 |
| 12 | 24 | September 26, 2001 | May 22, 2002 | #7 | 18.7 |
| 13 | 24 | October 2, 2002 | May 21, 2003 | #10 | 17.3 |
| 14 | 24 | September 24, 2003 | May 19, 2004 | #14 | 15.9 |
| 15 | 24 | September 22, 2004 | May 18, 2005 | #25 | 13.0 |
| 16 | 22 | September 21, 2005 | May 17, 2006 | #35 | 11.2 |
| 17 | 22 | September 22, 2006 | May 18, 2007 | #54 | 9.4 |
| 18 | 18 | January 2, 2008 | May 21, 2008 | #38 | 9.7 |
| 19 | 22 | November 5, 2008 | June 3, 2009 | #62 | 8.2 |
| 20 | 23 | September 25, 2009 | May 24, 2010 | #60 | 7.2 |
| 21 | 10 | February 24, 2022 | May 19, 2022 | #39 | 5.9 |
| 22 | 22 | September 22, 2022 | May 18, 2023 | #34 | 5.9 |
| 23 | 13 | January 18, 2024 | May 16, 2024 | TBA | TBA |
| 24 | 22 | October 3, 2024 | May 15, 2025 | TBA | TBA |
| 25 | 21 | September 25, 2025 | May 14, 2026 | TBA | TBA |
| 26 | TBA | October 8, 2026 | TBA | TBA | TBA |

== Cast and characters ==
| Character | Portrayed by | Position | Seasons | | | | | | | | | | | | | | | | | | | | | | | | | | |
| Character | Portrayed by | Position | 1 | 2 | 3 | 4 | 5 | 6 | 7 | 8 | 9 | M | 10 | 11 | 12 | 13 | 14 | 15 | 16 | 17 | 18 | 19 | 20 | 21 | 22 | 23 | 24 | 25 | 26 |
|---|---|---|---|---|---|---|---|---|---|---|---|---|---|---|---|---|---|---|---|---|---|---|---|---|---|---|---|---|---|
| Max Greevey | George Dzundza | Senior Detective; Sergeant | M | | | | | | | | | | | | | | | | | | | | | | | | | | |
| Mike Logan | Chris Noth | Junior Detective | M | M | M | M | M | | | | | M | | | | | | | | | | | | | | | | | |
| Donald Cragen | Dann Florek | Captain | M | M | M | | G | | | | | M | G | | | | | G | | | | | | | | | | | |
| Ben Stone | Michael Moriarty | Executive Assistant District Attorney | M | M | M | M | | | | | | | | | | | | | | | | | | | | | | | |
| Paul Robinette | Richard Brooks | Assistant District Attorney | M | M | M | | | G | | | | | | | | | | | G | G | | | | | | | | | |
| Adam Schiff | Steven Hill | District Attorney | M | M | M | M | M | M | M | M | M | | M | | | | | | | | | | | | | | | | |
| Phil Cerreta | Paul Sorvino | Senior Detective; Sergeant | | M | M | | | | | | | | | | | | | | | | | | | | | | | | |
| Lennie Briscoe | Jerry Orbach | Senior Detective | | | M | M | M | M | M | M | M | M | M | M | M | M | M | | | | | | | | | | | | |
| Anita Van Buren | S. Epatha Merkerson | Lieutenant | | | | M | M | M | M | M | M | M | M | M | M | M | M | M | M | M | M | M | M | | | | | | |
| Claire Kincaid | Jill Hennessy | Assistant District Attorney | | | | M | M | M | | | | | | | | | | | | | | | | | | | | | |
| Jack McCoy | Sam Waterston | Executive Assistant District Attorney; Interim District Attorney; District Attorney | | | | | M | M | M | M | M | M | M | M | M | M | M | M | M | M | M | M | M | M | M | M | | | |
| Rey Curtis | Benjamin Bratt | Junior Detective | | | | | | M | M | M | M | M | | | | | | | | | | | G | | | | | | |
| Jamie Ross | Carey Lowell | Assistant Districy Attorney | | | | | | | M | M | | | G | G | | | | | | | | | | G | | | | | |
| Abbie Carmichael | Angie Harmon | Assistant Districy Attorney | | | | | | | | | M | | M | M | | | | | | | | | | | | | | | |
| Ed Green | Jesse L. Martin | Junior Detective; Senior Detective | | | | | | | | | | | Main | Main | Main | Main | Main | Main | Main | Main | Main | | | | | | | | |
| Nora Lewin | Dianne Wiest | Interim District Attorney | | | | | | | | | | | | M | M | | | | | | | | | | | | | | |
| Serena Southerlyn | Elisabeth Röhm | Assistant District Attorney | | | | | | | | | | | | | M | M | M | M | | | | | | | | | | | |
| Arthur Branch | Fred Thompson | District Attorney | | | | | | | | | | | | | | M | M | M | M | M | | | | | | | | | |
| Joe Fontana | Dennis Farina | Senior Detective | | | | | | | | | | | | | | | | M | M | | | | | | | | | | |
| Nick Falco | Michael Imperioli | Junior Detective | | | | | | | | | | | | | | | | M | G | | | | | | | | | | |
| Alexandra Borgia | Annie Parisse | Assistant DA | | | | | | | | | | | | | | | | M | M | | | | | | | | | | |
| Nina Cassady | Milena Govich | Junior Detective | | | | | | | | | | | | | | | | | | M | | | | | | | | | |
| Connie Rubirosa | Alana de la Garza | Assistant District Attorney | | | | | | | | | | | | | | | | | | M | M | M | M | | | | | | |
| Cyrus Lupo | Jeremy Sisto | Junior Detective; Senior Detective | | | | | | | | | | | | | | | | | | | M | M | M | | | | | | |
| Michael Cutter | Linus Roache | Executive Assistant District Attorney | | | | | | | | | | | | | | | | | | | M | M | M | | | | | | |
| Kevin Bernard | Anthony Anderson | Junior Detective; Senior Detective | | | | | | | | | | | | | | | | | | | M | M | M | M | | | | | |
| Frank Cosgrove | Jeffrey Donovan | Junior Detective; Senior Detective | | | | | | | | | | | | | | | | | | | | | | M | M | | | | |
| Kate Dixon | Camryn Manheim | Lieutenant | | | | | | | | | | | | | | | | | | | | | | M | M | M | | | |
| Nolan Price | Hugh Dancy | Executive Assistant District Attorney | | | | | | | | | | | | | | | | | | | | | | M | M | M | M | M | M |
| Samantha Maroun | Odelya Halevi | Assistant District Attorney | | | | | | | | | | | | | | | | | | | | | | M | M | M | M | M | M |
| Jalen Shaw | Mehcad Brooks | Junior Detective; Senior Detective | | | | | | | | | | | | | | | | | | | | | | | M | M | M | M | |
| Vincent Riley | Reid Scott | Junior Detective; Senior Detective | | | | | | | | | | | | | | | | | | | | | | | | M | M | M | M |
| Nicholas Baxter | Tony Goldwyn | District Attorney | | | | | | | | | | | | | | | | | | | | | | | | M | M | M | M |
| Jessica Brady | Maura Tierney | Lieutenant | | | | | | | | | | | | | | | | | | | | | | | | | M | M | M |
| Theo Walker | David Ajala | Junior Detective | | | | | | | | | | | | | | | | | | | | | | | | | | M | M |
| Rob Calvino | James Badge Dale | Senior Dectective | | | | | | | | | | | | | | | | | | | | | | | | | | | M |

Cast of Law & Order

Season 1 (1990–1991), from left: George Dzundza, Michael Moriarty, Chris Noth, and Richard Brooks

Season 6 (1995–1996), from left: Benjamin Bratt, Sam Waterston, Jerry Orbach, and Jill Hennessy (This was the first cast line-up to not feature any of the originals, with the exception of Steven Hill.)

== Production ==
=== History and development ===
In 1988, Dick Wolf developed a concept for a new television series that was going to depict a relatively optimistic picture of the American criminal justice system. He initially toyed with the idea of calling it Night & Day but then hit upon the title Law & Order. The first half of each episode was going to follow two homicide detectives (a senior and a junior detective) and their commanding officer as they were investigating a violent crime.

The second half of the episode was going to follow the district attorney's office and the courts as two prosecutors, with advice from the district attorney, were attempting to convict the accused. Law & Order was going to be able to investigate some of the larger issues of the day by focusing on stories that were based on real cases making headlines.

Wolf took the idea to then-president of Universal Television Kerry McCluggage, who pointed out the similarity to a 1963 series titled Arrest and Trial, which lasted one season. The two watched the pilot of that series, in which a police officer (Ben Gazzara) arrested a man for armed robbery in the first half, and the defense attorney, played by Chuck Connors, gets the perpetrator off as the wrong guy in the second half; this was the formula of the show every week.

Wolf decided that he wanted a fresh approach to the genre. His detectives occasionally were going to be fallible. He wanted to go from police procedural to prosecution with a greater degree of realism. The prosecution was going to be the hero, a reversal of the usual formula in lawyer dramas.

Fox initially ordered 13 episodes based on the concept alone, with no pilot. Then-network head Barry Diller reversed the decision. He did not believe it was a "Fox show", although he loved the idea. Wolf then went to CBS, which ordered a pilot, "Everybody's Favorite Bagman", written by Wolf about corrupt city officials involved with the mob. The network liked the pilot but did not order it because there were no breakout stars.

NBC's top executives, Brandon Tartikoff and Warren Littlefield, screened the pilot and liked it in the summer of 1989. They were concerned that the intensity of the series was not going to be able to be repeated week after week. NBC executives had enough confidence by 1990 that the innovative show may appeal to a wide audience, and they ended up ordering the series for a full season.

=== Casting ===
==== Pilot ====
For the 1988 pilot, George Dzundza and Chris Noth were cast as the original detectives, Sergeant Max Greevey and Detective Mike Logan. The producers felt that Dzundza would be a perfect senior police officer as he was someone the producers felt they could see themselves riding along with in a police cruiser. Noth and Michael Madsen were candidates for the role of Logan. Madsen initially was considered the perfect choice for the role, but, in a final reading, it was felt that Madsen's acting mannerisms were repetitive, and Noth received the role instead. Rounding out the police cast, Dann Florek was cast as Captain Donald Cragen.

On the prosecutor's side, Michael Moriarty was Dick Wolf's choice to portray Executive Assistant District Attorney Benjamin "Ben" Stone. The network, however, preferred James Naughton, but, in the end, Wolf's choice would prevail, and Moriarty received the role. As his A.D.A., Richard Brooks and Eriq La Salle were being considered for the role of Paul Robinette. The network favored La Salle but, once again, the producers' choice prevailed, and Brooks received the role. As their boss, Roy Thinnes was cast as District Attorney Alfred Wentworth.

==== Seasons 1–3 ====
Nearly two years passed between the pilot and production of the series. The producers held options on Dzundza, Noth, Moriarty and Brooks. Each was paid holding money for the additional year and brought back. Florek also returned. Thinnes, however, was starring in Dark Shadows and declined to return. In his place, the producers tapped Steven Hill to portray District Attorney Adam Schiff, a character loosely based on real life New York County District Attorney Robert Morgenthau. Hill brought prestige and experience to the show, and as such, the producers allowed Hill to give insight on the direction he thought the character should go.

==== Seasons 4–7 ====
By the end of season 3, NBC executives still felt the show did not have enough female characters. On the orders of then network president Warren Littlefield, new female characters had to be added to the cast or the show would face possible cancellation on its relegated Friday nighttime slot. Wolf realized that, since there were only six characters on the show, someone had to be dismissed. He chose to dismiss Florek and Brooks from the regular roster, and later said it was the hardest two phone calls he had ever made. Though producers initially claimed the firings (especially that of Brooks who was reported as not getting along with Moriarty) were for other reasons, Wolf confirmed that the firings were on the orders of Littlefield.

To replace Florek, S. Epatha Merkerson was cast as new squad leader Lieutenant Anita Van Buren. (Merkerson had previously guest starred as a mother of a gunshot victim in the season 1 episode "Mushrooms".) To replace Brooks, Jill Hennessy was cast as Assistant District Attorney Claire Kincaid. Though no initial explanation was given on the show for the departures of Florek's or Brooks's characters, they would both later return in guest appearances, with Captain Cragen having been reassigned to the Internal Affairs Bureau and A.D.A. Robinette having become a defense attorney. Florek also returned to direct a few episodes, and his character was eventually added to the cast of Law & Order: Special Victims Unit.

Meanwhile, Moriarty's behavior both on and off the set became problematic for Wolf. After a public statement in which Moriarty called Attorney General Janet Reno a "psychopathic Nazi" for her efforts to censor television violence, Moriarty engaged in a verbal confrontation with Reno at a dinner in Washington, D.C. Wolf asked Moriarty to tone down his comments, and Moriarty responded by quitting the show the next week. The final storyline for Ben Stone involves his resignation over guilt after a woman he compelled to testify against a Russian mobster was murdered by his cohorts. To replace Moriarty, Sam Waterston was Wolf's first choice for the role of Executive Assistant District Attorney John James "Jack" McCoy Jr.; Waterston's character was markedly different from Moriarty's in that Jack McCoy was conceived as more emotionally stable and having more sex appeal.

Wolf dismissed Noth when his contract expired at the end of season 5, because he felt that Lennie Briscoe and Mike Logan had become too similar to each other, and the writers were having difficulty in writing their dialogue together. Furthermore, Noth had been disgruntled with the show since the dismissals of Florek and Brooks, and remained embittered against Wolf, who he felt was not a friend to his actors. The final storyline for Detective Logan involved his banishment to work on Staten Island in a domestic violence crimes unit as punishment for punching a city council member who had orchestrated the murder of a gay colleague and had managed to get acquitted of the charges. (The made-for-television film Exiled: A Law & Order Movie, in which Noth starred, centers on Logan's attempt to get back into the department's good graces.) Noth was replaced by Benjamin Bratt as Detective Reynaldo "Rey" Curtis, who was hired in an attempt to find an actor even sexier than Noth to join the cast.

Hennessy chose not to renew her three-year contract at the end of season 6 to pursue other projects, and Claire Kincaid was written off as being killed in a drunk driving crash. She was replaced by Carey Lowell as Assistant District Attorney Jamie Ross. Lowell remained with the show until the end of season 8, when she left to spend more time with her daughter. (Jamie Ross was written off as leaving the D.A.'s office for similar reasons.) Lowell (who later returned for a couple of guest appearances) was replaced by Angie Harmon as Assistant District Attorney Abigail "Abbie" Carmichael, who was conceived as being much louder and outspoken than any of her predecessors. Harmon auditioned with 85 other women, including Vanessa Williams, for the role, and was picked after Wolf heard her Texas accent.

==== Seasons 8–14 ====
Beginning in season 8 (1997), J. K. Simmons had the recurring role of Dr. Emil Skoda, a psychiatrist who worked with the Police Department. He appeared in 41 episodes until 2004. He then reappeared for three episodes in season 20.

Bratt left the series at the end of season 9, stating it was an amicable departure and he expected to eventually return for guest appearances. (He ultimately returned for the season 20 episode "Fed".) Detective Curtis was written off as leaving the force in order to take care of his wife, who was suffering from multiple sclerosis, in her final days. He was replaced by Jesse L. Martin as Detective Ed Green, who was conceived of as more of a loose cannon in the mold of Noth's Logan than Bratt's Curtis was. (Briscoe was described as being a recovering alcoholic, as Cragen had been. Green was described as being a recovering compulsive gambler.) In 2000, Steven Hill announced he was leaving the series after season 10. Hill, who was the last remaining member of the original cast, said his departure was mutual with the producers. He was replaced by Dianne Wiest as Interim District Attorney Nora Lewin, and Adam Schiff was written out off-screen as departing to work with Jewish charities and human-rights organizations in Europe.

The following year, Harmon left the show after three seasons (with Abbie Carmichael written off as being called on to serve the U.S. Attorney's office) and was replaced by Elisabeth Röhm as Assistant District Attorney Serena Southerlyn. The year after that, Wiest left the show after two seasons and was replaced by retiring U.S. Senator Fred Thompson as District Attorney Arthur Branch, whose character was conceived of as being much more right-leaning than his predecessors in the D.A.'s office, and was a direct reaction to the September 11 attacks. No mention was made on the show of what happened to Nora Lewin, though producers said her character was only supposed to be an interim D.A.

==== Seasons 15–16 ====
After 12 years on Law & Order, Orbach announced in March 2004 that he was leaving the show at the end of season 14 for the spin-off Law & Order: Trial by Jury. Lennie Briscoe was written off as retiring from the NYPD and later taking a position as an investigator for the D.A.'s office. He was replaced at the 27th Precinct by Detective Joe Fontana, played by Dennis Farina. At the time, Orbach would not state the reason for his departure, but it was eventually revealed that he had been battling prostate cancer (for over 10 years) and that his role on Trial by Jury was designed to be less taxing on him than his role on the original series was. However, Orbach died from his cancer on December 28, 2004, and was featured in only the first two episodes of Trial by Jury. (His character was subsequently written off as having also died off-screen, though this was not revealed on the original series until the season 18 episode "Burn Card".)

In Season 15, Röhm left the show mid-season in January 2005. Röhm's final scene on the show, in the episode "Ain't No Love", sparked controversy within the fanbase, as A.D.A. Southerlyn asked Arthur Branch if she was being fired because she was a lesbian, a fact the scripts had never hinted at until then. Wolf said Röhm's departure was unexpected. For a few seasons, Southerlyn had often argued opposing points to McCoy and Branch, the latter of whom thought she would be better as a defender rather than a prosecutor. Southerlyn's replacement was Annie Parisse as Assistant District Attorney Alexandra Borgia.

Martin left the show midseason to film Rent. Ed Green was temporarily written off as being shot in the line of duty and was replaced during his recovery by Detective Nick Falco, played by Michael Imperioli, who had previously guest-starred as a murder suspect in the season 6 episode "Atonement". Parisse left the series at the end of season 16 (with A.D.A. Borgia written off as being murdered), and Farina shortly afterward announced that he was leaving the show to pursue other projects. (Detective Fontana was written off as having retired off-screen.)

==== Seasons 17–20 ====
By this point, NBC executives believed the series was beginning to show its age, as the ratings had been declining since Orbach's departure. Farina had never been popular with fans when he replaced Orbach, and it was felt that the cast just did not seem to mesh well together anymore. In an effort to revitalize the show, Wolf replaced Parisse with Alana de la Garza as Assistant District Attorney Consuela "Connie" Rubirosa, while Martin's Green was promoted to senior detective and partnered with Detective Nina Cassady, played by Milena Govich, who had worked with Wolf on the short-lived series Conviction and served as the show's first female detective of the main cast. She also briefly appeared as a bartender in the season 16 episode titled "Flaw".

However, Govich proved to be even more unpopular with fans than her predecessor was and left the show after one season with the explanation being that Detective Cassady's assignment to the precinct had been temporary and had been transferred out. She was replaced by Jeremy Sisto, who had previously guest starred as a defense attorney in the season 17 episode "The Family Hour", as Detective Cyrus Lupo. Around the same time, Thompson announced he would leave the show to seek the 2008 Republican presidential nomination. (No explanation was given within the show regarding Arthur Branch's off-screen departure.) Waterston's character was promoted to Interim District Attorney (later made full District Attorney in season 20) and his former position was filled in by Executive Assistant District Attorney Michael Cutter, played by Linus Roache.

Martin later announced that he would leave the show for the second and last time near the end of season 18 to pursue other endeavors, and Detective Green was written off as resigning from the force due to burnout. He was replaced by Anthony Anderson as Detective Kevin Bernard. In 2010, Merkerson announced that she would leave the show at the end of season 20, with Lieutenant Van Buren given a season-long story arc involving her battling cervical cancer. However, the cancellation of the show rendered this moot.

==== Season 21–present (revived series) ====
In Deadline Hollywood, Nellie Andreeva announced the series was returning. On November 1, 2021, Jeffrey Donovan was cast as a series regular to portray an NYPD detective, later revealed to be named Frank Cosgrove. At that time, it was also reported that Sam Waterston and Anthony Anderson, who starred in earlier seasons of the series, and additional former cast members were also in talks to return. Waterston previously stated in 2015 that he would be open to returning. Other previous cast members including S. Epatha Merkerson, Jeremy Sisto and Alana de la Garza hold starring roles on Chicago Med or FBI, with both also being part of the franchise and Wolf Entertainment series. On November 23, 2021, it was announced that Hugh Dancy had been cast as an assistant district attorney and that Anderson had signed a one-year deal to return as Detective Kevin Bernard. On December 10, 2021, it was revealed that Camryn Manheim had been cast as Lieutenant Kate Dixon, the successor to Merkerson's character, Lieutenant Anita Van Buren. Manheim portrayed minor characters in previous seasons of the series. In December 2021, Odelya Halevi was added to the cast as Assistant District Attorney Samantha Maroun. A day later, Waterston was announced to have finalized a one-year deal to return as District Attorney Jack McCoy.

On May 10, 2022, the series was renewed by NBC for a 22nd season. Later that same month, it was announced that Anderson would leave the series. On June 7, Waterston signed a new deal to return for the 22nd season, making him the longest-running cast member of the series. A week later, Mehcad Brooks joined the cast in the new season, replacing Anderson as Detective Jalen Shaw. On November 15, 2023, it was announced that Donovan would be not returning for the 23rd season. A week later, Reid Scott joined the cast for the 23rd season, replacing Donovan as Detective Vincent Riley. On February 2, 2024, it was announced that Waterston would depart from the series and Tony Goldwyn would join the cast as District Attorney Nicholas Baxter. On May 10, 2024, it was announced Camryn Manheim would depart the series after season 23. On July 22, 2024, Maura Tierney was cast as a new lieutenant for season 24, replacing Manheim as Lieutenant Jessica Brady. In May 2025, NBC renewed the series for its twenty-fifth season. On September 24, 2025, it was revealed that David Ajala was set to join the show's main cast as an NYPD detective partway into its 25th season, replacing Brooks. Ajala would debut on Law & Order as Detective Theo Walker on the November 13, 2025, episode Guardian.

In July 2026, it was announced Scott would depart during the twenty-sixth season, due to the continued commute to film the series. James Badge Dale was named as his successor in the role of Rob Calvino.

=== Filming ===
The series is shot on location in New York City and is known for its extensive use of local color. The interior sets were located at Chelsea Piers. For the revived version starting with Season 21, sets were reconstructed in Brooklyn. In early episodes, courtroom scenes were shot at Tweed Courthouse before a courtroom set was built. The exterior of the fictional 27th precinct police station was shot outside the New York County Surrogate's on Chambers St, while hospital scenes were filmed at the VA New York Harbor Medical Health Care Center on East 23rd St, and Goldwater Memorial Hospital before its demolition.

In later seasons, New York City mayors Rudy Giuliani and Michael Bloomberg, attorney William Kunstler and Bronx Congressman José Serrano all appeared on the show as themselves. Local personalities also had recurring cameos as fictional characters, such as Donna Hanover and Fran Lebowitz as judges. On September 14, 2004, in New York City, a road leading to Pier 62 at Chelsea Piers (where the series was mostly shot) was renamed "Law & Order Way" in tribute to the series.

=== Music and sound effects ===
Opening Theme

The Law & Order "clang" sound

The music for Law & Order was composed by veteran composer Mike Post and was deliberately designed to be minimal to match the abbreviated style of the series. Post wrote the theme song using electric piano, guitar, and clarinet. In addition, scene changes were accompanied by a tone generated by Post. He refers to the tone as "The Clang", while Entertainment Weekly critic Ken Tucker has referred to the sound as the "ominous chung CHUNG", actor Dann Florek (in a promo) as the "doink doink", and Richard Belzer as "the Dick Wolf Cash Register Sound".

According to writer David Allan, 2021:

"The tone moves the viewer from scene to scene, jumping forward in time with all the importance and immediacy of a judge's gavel – which is exactly what Post was aiming for when he created it. While reminiscent of a jail door slamming..."

But according to authors Susan Green and Randee Dawn:

"...it is actually an amalgamation of 'six or seven' sounds, including the sound made by 500 Japanese men walking across a hardwood floor." The sound has become so associated with the Law & Order brand that it was also carried over to other series of the franchise."

The British-aired Channel Five versions of seasons 7–16 of Law & Order feature the song "I'm Not Driving Anymore" by Rob Dougan in the opening credits, while seasons 17–20 used the American theme.

=== Syndication and streaming ===
Repeats of Law & Order were first broadcast weekdays on cable TV network A&E during the 1994–95 season. The A&E broadcasts were credited with drawing a new, much larger audience to the current weekly NBC Law & Order episodes. In 2001, A&E did not renew its contract to syndicate Law & Order as the price was then four times the original 1995 contract price. Reruns moved to TNT, where they remained until 2019.

As of 2023, the series is being broadcast on Sundance TV, WE tv, Ion Mystery, BBC America, Bounce TV, Paramount Network and Pop.

Since mid-2020, selected seasons of Law & Order have been available for streaming on Peacock along with Chicago Fire, Chicago P.D., Chicago Med, Law & Order: Special Victims Unit, and Law & Order: Criminal Intent. However, unlike some shows on Peacock such as selected seasons of SVU, which are free, access to Law & Order requires a paid Peacock subscription.

As of December 16, 2024, Law & Order seasons 1–20 are now available to stream on Hulu.

A free ad-supported streaming television channel featuring Law & Order episodes from Seasons 5 through 10 launched in September 2025 on various platforms.

== Cancellation and revival ==
On May 14, 2010, NBC officially canceled Law & Order, opting instead to pick up Law & Order: Los Angeles as a series and renew Law & Order: Special Victims Unit for a twelfth season. Creator Dick Wolf continued to pressure the series' producer NBCUniversal to make a deal with TNT, which held syndication rights to the show, for a twenty-first season if an acceptable license fee could be negotiated. Talks between the two started up after upfronts. However, TNT said in a statement it was not interested in picking the show up for a new season.

After TNT discussions fell through, cable network AMC also considered reviving Law & Order; however, attempts to revive it failed, and according to creator Dick Wolf, the series "moved into the history books".

In February 2015, NBC considered bringing the series back for a 10-episode limited series.

On September 28, 2021, NBC announced that a 21st season had been ordered. The new season was announced after plans for a new Law & Order spin-off, For the Defense, had fallen through during the summer. On November 1, 2021, it was announced that Jeffrey Donovan was cast as a new series regular, while Sam Waterston and Anthony Anderson would later be announced to return. On November 12, 2021, it was announced that the 21st season would premiere on February 24, 2022.

On November 23, 2021, it was announced that Hugh Dancy would join the cast for the 21st season, and it was announced Anderson would reprise his role as Detective Kevin Bernard.

On December 10, 2021, it was revealed that Camryn Manheim had been cast as Lieutenant Kate Dixon, the successor to Merkerson's character, Lieutenant Anita Van Buren. Manheim portrayed minor characters in previous seasons of the series. On December 15, 2021, Odelya Halevi was announced to be joining the cast as Assistant District Attorney Samantha Maroun. A day later, Waterston was announced to have finalized a one-year deal to return as District Attorney Jack McCoy. Law & Order officially aired its first new episode in almost 12 years on February 24, 2022.

On May 10, 2022, NBC renewed the series for a twenty-second season. One week after the twenty-first season ended, On May 26, 2022, it was confirmed that Anderson would not be returning for the twenty-second season. On June 7, 2022, it was announced that Waterston would reprise his role as McCoy for the twenty-second season. On June 13, 2022, it was reported that Mehcad Brooks was cast for the twenty-second season.

On April 10, 2023, the series was renewed for its twenty-third season, which premiered on January 18, 2024. Two months later, the series was renewed for its twenty-fourth season. On May 8, 2025, the series was renewed for its twenty-fifth season.

In May 2026, the series was renewed for its twenty-sixth season. The renewal, described as an eleventh-hour decision by NBC, came following budget cuts and a shift in scheduling from the network. The season premiered on October 8 of the same year.

== Spin-offs, crossovers, and adaptations ==
The longevity and success of Law & Order have spawned six American television series (Law & Order: Special Victims Unit, Law & Order: Criminal Intent, Law & Order: Trial by Jury, Law & Order: LA, Law & Order True Crime, and Law & Order: Organized Crime) as well as a television film (Exiled: A Law & Order Movie). The commercial potential of the Law & Order name outweighed initial fears that failed spin-offs (such as Trial by Jury and Los Angeles) could erode the audience of the original series. To differentiate it from other series in the franchise, Law & Order is often referred to as "The Mother Ship" by producers and critics.

Law & Order has had crossover episodes with other series in its franchise. Additionally, it crossed over with New York Undercover and Conviction; while neither series belongs to the Law & Order franchise officially, both are part of its fictional universe, and were also created by Wolf. It also had several crossover episodes with Homicide: Life on the Street. Law & Order's success has spawned two other external franchises that co-exist in the same universe (Chicago and FBI). Chicago and Law & Order were connected through Chicago Fire and Chicago P.D. with crossovers between SVU. Chicago P.D. also had crossovers with FBI.

The series has been adapted for British television as Law & Order: UK, with the setting being changed to London. In 2024, a Canadian produced series, Law & Order Toronto: Criminal Intent premiered on Citytv; this series is based on the Criminal Intent format and set in the city of Toronto.

There have been a few unofficial "rip-offs" of Law & Order in other countries. For example, Singapore's version of Law & Order was entitled Code of Law, starring Keagan Kang and Joanne Peh as Jacob Fernandez and Sabrina Wong (the counterparts to Jack McCoy and Serena Southerlyn respectively from the original Law & Order), and aired a total of five seasons of 59 episodes between September 2012 and June 2020.

== Awards and honors ==
Law & Order has been nominated for numerous awards in the television industry over the span of its run.

Among its wins are the 1997 Primetime Emmy Award for Outstanding Drama Series, Screen Actors Guild Awards for Outstanding Male Actor in a Drama Series for Sam Waterston in 1999 and Jerry Orbach in 2005 (awarded after his death), and numerous Edgar Awards for Best Episode in a Television Series Teleplay.

In 2002, Law & Order was ranked #24 on TV Guide's 50 Greatest TV Shows of All Time. The show also placed #27 on Entertainment Weekly's "New TV Classics" list.

In 2013, TV Guide ranked Law & Order #14 on their list of the 60 Greatest Shows of All Time.

== Broadcast history ==
=== Broadcast ===
The show premiered September 13, 1990, and ended its first run on May 24, 2010. 456 episodes were aired and produced. The show ran for twenty seasons on NBC. In 2002, Law & Order surpassed Hawaii Five-O as the longest-running police drama on American television. At this time, it was NBC's longest running crime drama and tied for longest-running primetime scripted drama with Gunsmoke. The first two seasons were broadcast Tuesdays at 10 p.m. From season 3 through 16, the show aired Wednesday at 10 p.m. For season 17, it moved to Fridays at 10 p.m. For seasons 18 and 19, the show shifted back to Wednesdays at 10 p.m. For season 20, the show was broadcast Fridays at 8 p.m., while in the spring it moved to Mondays at 10 p.m., where it broadcast its initial series finale on May 24, 2010. The revival (season 21–present) now airs as part of NBC's 'Law & Order Thursday' lineup broadcasting Thursdays at 8 p.m. from February 2022 to May 2026. Beginning with the twenty-sixth season, the series will move to the 10 p.m. time slot.

Viewership and ratings per season of Law & Order
| Season | Timeslot (ET) | Episodes | First aired | | Last aired | | TV season | Viewership rank | Avg. viewers (millions) |
| Season | Timeslot (ET) | Episodes | Date | Viewers (millions) | Date | Viewers (millions) | TV season | Viewership rank | Avg. viewers (millions) |
|---|---|---|---|---|---|---|---|---|---|
| 1 | Thursday 10:00 p.m. (eps 1–4); Tuesday 10:00 p.m. (eps 5–21); Sunday 10:00 p.m. (ep 22) | 22 | September 13, 1990 | 14.0 | June 9, 1991 | 12.2 | 1990–91 | 46 | 12.1 |
| 2 | Tuesday 10:00 p.m. (eps 1–12); Tuesday 9:00 p.m. (eps 13–22) | 22 | September 17, 1991 | 16.4 | May 12, 1992 | 12.1 | 1991–92 | 46 | 12.3 |
| 3 | Wednesday 10:00 p.m. | 22 | September 23, 1992 | 14.9 | May 19, 1993 | 15.4 | 1992–93 | 56 | 10.2 |
| 4 | Wednesday 10:00 p.m. (eps 1–7, 10-22); Tuesday 10:00 p.m. (eps 8–9) | 22 | September 15, 1993 | 13.6 | May 25, 1994 | 15.4 | 1993–94 | 38 | 11.9 |
| 5 | Wednesday 10:00 p.m. | 23 | September 21, 1994 | 18.3 | May 24, 1995 | 13.4 | 1994–95 | 27 | 11.6 |
| 6 | Wednesday 10:00 p.m. (eps 1–18, 20–23); Sunday 10:00 p.m. (ep 19) | 23 | September 20, 1995 | 17.3 | May 22, 1996 | 15.0 | 1995–96 | 24 | 10.9 |
| 7 | Wednesday 10:00 p.m. (eps 1–14, 18–23); Thursday 10:00 p.m. (eps 15–17) | 23 | September 18, 1996 | 15.7 | May 21, 1997 | 14.88 | 1996–97 | 27 | 10.5 |
| 8 | Wednesday 10:00 p.m. (eps 1–19, 21–24); Friday 9:00 p.m. (ep 20) | 24 | September 24, 1997 | 17.58 | May 20, 1998 | 14.80 | 1997–98 | 24 | 14.1 |
| 9 | Wednesday 10:00 p.m. (eps 1–11, eps 13–22, ep 24); Sunday 9:00 p.m. (Film, 11/8); Wednesday 9:00 p.m. (ep 12, ep 23) | 24 | September 23, 1998 | 15.56 | May 26, 1999 | 19.29 | 1998–99 | 20 | 13.8 |
| 10 | Wednesday 10:00 p.m. (eps 1–13, eps 15–22, ep 24); Friday 9:00 p.m. (ep 14); Wednesday 9:00 p.m. (ep 23) | 24 | September 22, 1999 | 18.63 | May 24, 2000 | 19.48 | 1999–2000 | 13 | 16.3 |
| 11 | Wednesday 10:00 p.m. (eps 1–18, eps 20–22, ep 24); Wednesday 9:00 p.m. (ep 19, ep 23) | 24 | October 18, 2000 | 17.77 | May 23, 2001 | 20.03 | 2000–01 | 11 | 17.7 |
| 12 | Wednesday 10:00 p.m. | 24 | September 26, 2001 | 20.68 | May 22, 2002 | 19.51 | 2001–02 | 7 | 18.7 |
| 13 | Wednesday 10:00 p.m. (eps 1–17, eps 19–22, ep 24); Thursday 10:00 p.m. (ep 18); Wednesday 9:00 p.m. (ep 23) | 24 | October 2, 2002 | 19.13 | May 21, 2003 | 19.02 | 2002–03 | 10 | 17.3 |
| 14 | Wednesday 10:00 p.m. | 24 | September 24, 2003 | 20.86 | May 19, 2004 | 19.46 | 2003–04 | 14 | 15.9 |
| 15 | Wednesday 9:00 p.m. (ep 1); Wednesday 10:00 p.m. (eps 2–24) | 24 | September 22, 2004 | 18.86 | May 18, 2005 | 12.41 | 2004–05 | 25 | 13.0 |
| 16 | Wednesday 10:00 p.m. (eps 1–16, eps 19–22); Wednesday 9:00 p.m. (eps 17–18) | 22 | September 21, 2005 | 13.04 | May 17, 2006 | 13.59 | 2005–06 | 35 | 11.2 |
| 17 | Friday 10:00 p.m. | 22 | September 22, 2006 | 11.07 | May 18, 2007 | 9.23 | 2006–07 | 54 | 9.4 |
| 18 | Wednesday 9:00 p.m. (ep 1); Wednesday 10:00 p.m. (eps 2–18) | 18 | January 2, 2008 | 13.46 | May 21, 2008 | 8.57 | 2007–08 | 38 | 9.7 |
| 19 | Wednesday 10:00 p.m. | 22 | November 5, 2008 | 7.94 | June 3, 2009 | 8.87 | 2008–09 | 62 | 8.2 |
| 20 | Friday 8:00 p.m. (eps 1–7, eps 9–12); Friday 9:00 p.m. (ep 8); Monday 9:00 p.m. (eps 13, 21); Monday 10:00 p.m. (eps 14–20, eps 22–23) | 23 | September 25, 2009 | 6.25 | May 24, 2010 | 7.84 | 2009–10 | 60 | 7.2 |
| 21 | Thursday 8:00 p.m. | 10 | February 24, 2022 | 5.80 | May 19, 2022 | 3.94 | 2021–22 | 39 | 5.92 |
| 22 | Thursday 8:00 p.m. | 22 | September 22, 2022 | 4.69 | May 18, 2023 | 3.96 | 2022–23 | 34 | 5.88 |
| 23 | Thursday 8:00 p.m. | 13 | January 18, 2024 | 5.32 | May 16, 2024 | 3.68 | 2023–24 | 34 | 5.75 |
| 24 | Thursday 8:00 p.m. | 22 | October 3, 2024 | 3.64 | May 15, 2025 | 3.67 | 2024–25 | TBD | TBD |
| 25 | Thursday 8:00 p.m. | 21 | September 25, 2025 | 3.59 | May 14, 2026 | 3.98 | 2025–26 | TBD | TBD |
| 26 | Thursday 10:00 p.m. | TBA | October 9, 2026 | TBD | TBA | TBD | 2026–27 | TBD | TBD |

== Home media ==
A box set titled Law & Order Producer's Collection was released on VHS in 2000. The 3-tape set included six episodes of the series.

Universal Studios has separately released all twenty seasons on DVD in Region 1, along with the complete series in a box set. Law & Order: The Complete Series boxed set features all 20 seasons from the original 1990-2010 run. Each season is individually packaged (in tray-stack style), with all new cover-art (including new cover art for the seasons that have been released). The set also includes a 50-page full-color book titled "The Episode Guide". Along with episode names and synopsis, there is trivia, facts about the making of the show, liner notes, and over 80 full-color photos. In Region 2, Universal Playback has released the first seven seasons on DVD in the UK. In Region 4, Universal Pictures has released all 20 seasons on DVD in Australia and New Zealand.

| Title | Ep# | Release dates | | |
| Title | Ep# | Region 1 | Region 2 | Region 4 |
| The 1st Year | 22 | October 15, 2002 / June 4, 2013 (slimline set) | June 16, 2003 | April 2, 2003 / August 31, 2011 (slimline set) |
| The 2nd Year | 22 | May 4, 2004 / June 3, 2014 (slimline set) | February 28, 2005 | August 31, 2011 |
| The 3rd Year | 22 | May 24, 2005 / June 3, 2014 (slimline set) | November 21, 2005 | August 31, 2011 |
| The 4th Year | 22 | December 6, 2005 / June 3, 2014 (slimline set) | July 17, 2006 | August 31, 2011 |
| The 5th Year | 23 | April 3, 2007 / June 3, 2014 (slimline set) | July 23, 2007 | August 31, 2011 |
| The 6th Year | 23 | December 2, 2008 / May 26, 2015 (slimline set) | February 16, 2009 | August 31, 2011 |
| The 7th Year | 23 | January 19, 2010 / May 26, 2015 (slimline set) | April 12, 2010 | August 31, 2011 |
| The 8th Year | 24 | December 7, 2010 / May 26, 2015 (slimline set) | | August 31, 2011 |
| The 9th Year | 24 | December 6, 2011 (slimline set) | | August 3, 2016 |
| The 10th Year | 24 | February 28, 2012 (slimline set) | | August 3, 2016 |
| The 11th Year | 24 | November 6, 2012 (slimline set) | | August 3, 2016 |
| The 12th Year | 24 | February 26, 2013 (slimline set) | | October 5, 2016 |
| The 13th Year | 24 | November 5, 2013 (slimline set) | | October 5, 2016 |
| The 14th Year | 24 | September 14, 2004 / February 25, 2014 (slimline set) | | October 5, 2016 |
| The 15th Year | 24 | November 4, 2014 (slimline set) | | March 2, 2017 |
| The 16th Year | 22 | November 4, 2014 (slimline set) | | March 2, 2017 |
| The 17th Year | 22 | November 4, 2014 (slimline set) | | March 2, 2017 |
| The 18th Year | 18 | May 5, 2015 (slimline set) | | April 5, 2017 |
| The 19th Year | 22 | May 5, 2015 (slimline set) | | April 5, 2017 |
| The 20th Year | 23 | May 5, 2015 (slimline set) | | April 5, 2017 |
| The Complete Series 1–20 | 456 | November 8, 2011 (box set) | | November 16, 2016 |

== See also ==
- List of police television dramas
