= Lana Young =

American actress

- Born: Bermuda
- Occupation: Actress
- Years active: 2002–present

Lana Young is a Bermudian-American actress, known for numerous tv and film roles in the United States.

== Life and career ==
Young was born in Bermuda to a black Bermudian father and Northern Irish mother. Lana worked in finance and was heavily involved in amateur theatre in Bermuda. She moved from Bermuda to the United States (Boston) in 1998 where she was briefly married and continued her work in the corporate world while pursue acting as a hobby. In 2002, Lana auditioned and booked her first ever on-camera role in the TV film, Killer Flood giving her the confidence to finally pursue her passion for acting as a career. She earned a spot out of thousands of auditioners around the globe in the coveted MA in Acting program at Arts Educational School London. Her first professional stage job was at the New Vic theatre where she joined the ensemble for The Graduate in 2004. She moved to LA in 2005 and New York City in 2014 with a 5-year hiatus in Charlottesville, VA in between. Young performed on stage, film and television, notable appearing in more than 30 guest-starring roles on television series, such as Zoey 101, The Vampire Diaries, Devious Maids, Nashville, Jessica Jones, Kevin Can Wait, Law & Order, Law & Order: Special Victims Unit, NCIS: New Orleans, Dynasty and WandaVision. In 2018, Young was cast as a series regular in the Oprah Winfrey Network drama series, Love Is, but later it was announced that Wendy Davis would replace her. Young later had the recurring roles in the Oprah Winfrey Network dramas Greenleaf and Ambitions. She also had a recurring role as Dr. Mary Osder in the Fox medical drama, The Resident from 2018 to 2022.

In 2022, Young starred in the period romantic drama film, A Jazzman's Blues directed by Tyler Perry. Her other film credits include Beginners (2010), Southpaw (2015), The Girl on the Train (2016), Monsters and Men (2018), Where'd You Go, Bernadette (2019), Like a Boss (2020) and Your Monster (2024).
