= Angel Desai =

American actress

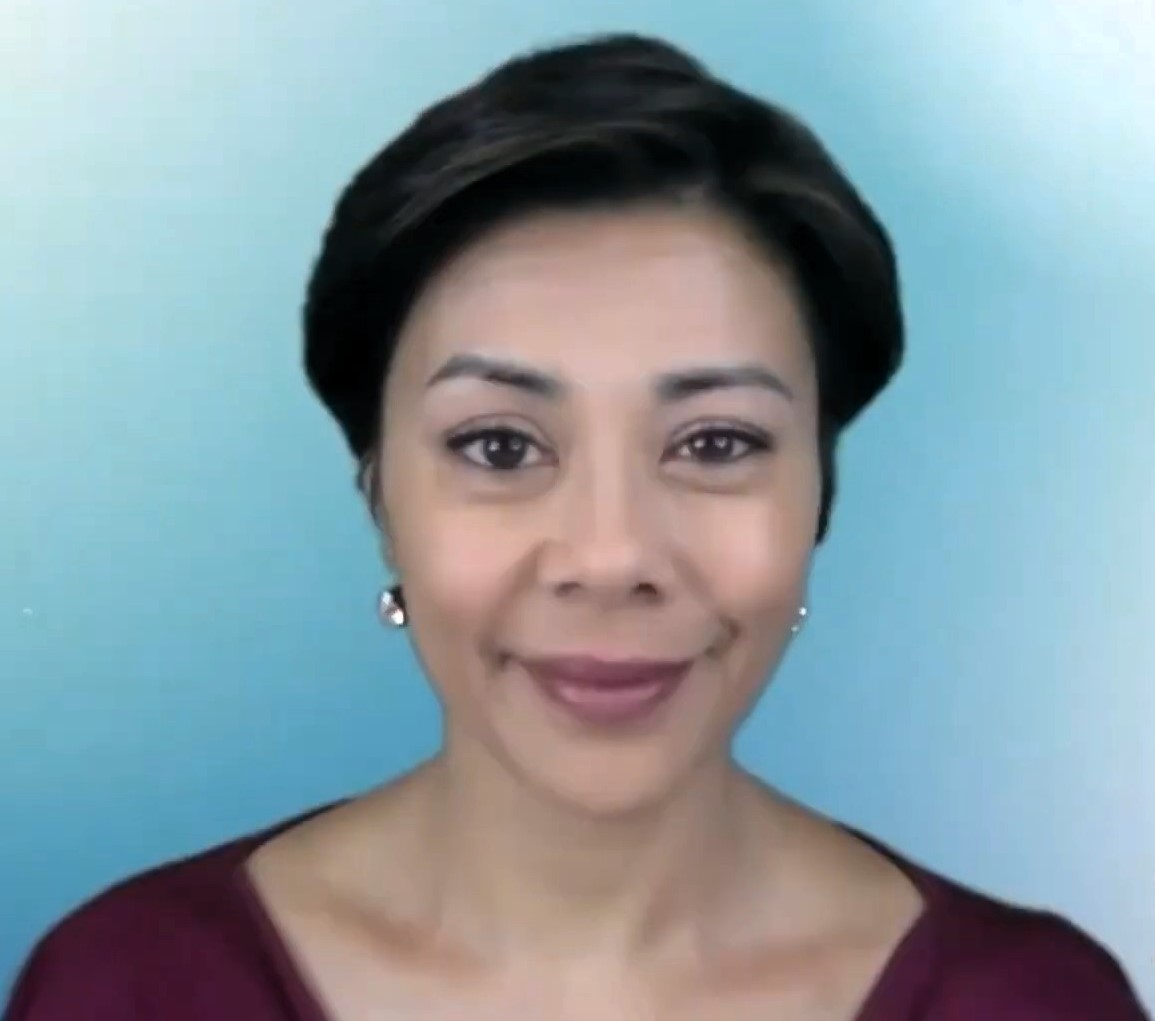
- Desai in 2022
- Born: Philadelphia, Pennsylvania, U.S.
- Education: Oberlin College (BA); New York University (MFA)

Angel Desai (born Apsara Desai) is an American actress.

== Early life and education ==
Desai was born in Philadelphia, but grew up in Binghamton, New York. Her parents are physicians; her father is Gujarati and her mother is Filipina. She cultivated an early interest in performance and was active in the musical and acting life of her schools. After graduating from high school in 1990, she attended and graduated from Oberlin College. In 1997, she earned her MFA at New York University in its Tisch School of the Arts Graduate Acting Program.

== Stage career ==
Desai has performed in many Off-Broadway productions, including The Winter’s Tale (2003), playing opposite David Strathairn, and The Tempest (2008), starring Mandy Patinkin.

Her Broadway debut was playing Marta in the Tony Award winning 2006 revival of Stephen Sondheim’s Company, in which her rendition of the show-stopping “Another Hundred People” met with critical praise.

Other stage performances include David Schulner's An Infinite Ache in New Haven, Connecticut and as part of Shinsai: Theaters for Japan, a benefit production performing "Four Black Dragons" and "Next" from Pacific Overtures by Stephen Sondheim and John Weidman.

== Screen career ==
The 2001 comedy feature film Black Knight starring Martin Lawrence was Desai’s cinema debut. She has since had supporting roles in such films as Heights and The War Within.

Desai's television credits include recurring roles in The Education of Max Bickford, Law & Order, Law & Order: Special Victims Unit, Law & Order: Criminal Intent, Kings, Dollhouse, The Event, Jessica Jones, and Damages.

== Additional interests and activities ==
Desai is a founding member of the Asian American Performers Action Coalition (AAPAC).

She is a musician, playing the violin and the piano. She is a jazz vocalist as well, performing as part of the Angel Desai/Oscar Perez Quartet.

She volunteers with the 52nd Street Project, a non-profit organization in Manhattan's Hell’s Kitchen neighborhood.
