= Reid Scott (actor) =

American actor (born 1977)

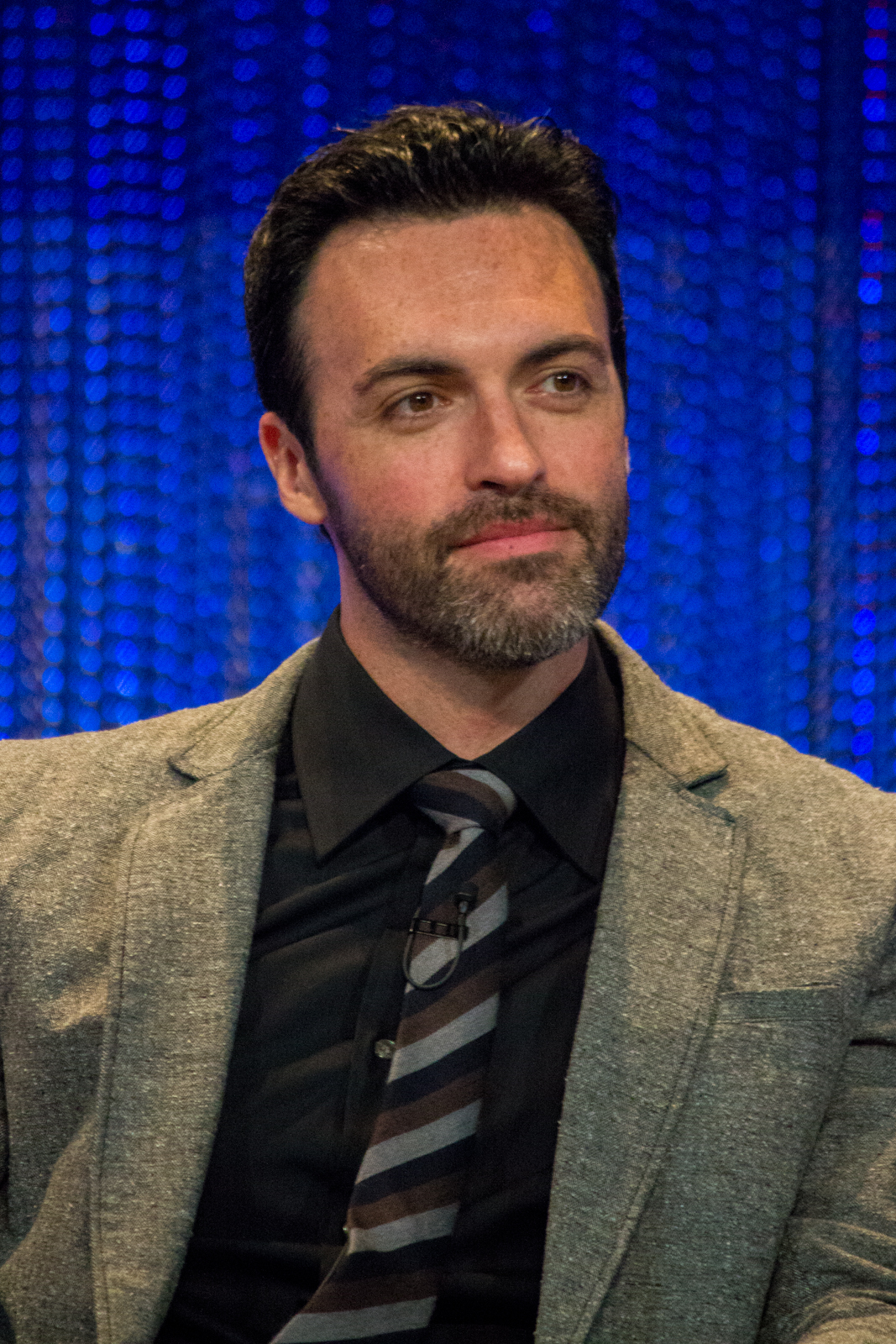
- Scott at the 2014 PaleyFest
- Born: Reid Scott Weiner; November 19, 1977 (age 48); Albany, New York, U.S.
- Education: Syracuse University (BFA)
- Occupation: Actor
- Years active: 2002–present
- Spouse: Elspeth Keller (m. 2014)
- Children: 2

Reid Scott Weiner (born November 19, 1977) is an American actor. He is best known for his starring roles as Brendan "Brando" Dorff in the TBS comedy series My Boys (2006–2010), Dan Egan in the HBO comedy series Veep (2012–2019), Gordon Ford in The Marvelous Mrs. Maisel (2022–2023), and NYPD Detective Vincent Riley on Law & Order (2024–2026). He also appeared in the romantic comedy film Home Again (2017), the superhero film Venom (2018), and the comedy-drama film Late Night (2019).

== Early life ==
Scott was born on November 19, 1977. He grew up in Clifton Park, New York. He attended La Salle Institute in Troy, New York, and Syracuse University, graduating in 2000, before moving to New York City to pursue his acting/writing career.

== Career ==
Scott began his career with roles in the off-Broadway play Cargo and several television commercials, including a Diet Coke ad set in a movie theater. In 2002, he won the lead role in the Fox pilot With You in Spirit, for which he received his Screen Actors Guild card. Scott recalls, "I remember thinking that the money from the pilot was a fortune. It wasn't. After renting a car to get around L.A., paying off some debt, and maybe buying a new pair of shoes, I was broke. I had to borrow money from my father just to join SAG."

Since then he has appeared in television and film, most notably My Boys, an original series on TBS. He appeared in an episode of Bones, in The Secret Life of the American Teenager as Dr. Jeff Tseguay, as Mike in Motorcity and in CSI: NY as Seth Riggin. Scott joined the cast of Showtime's The Big C in 2010. He played Dr. Todd Mauer, oncologist for the main character (played by Laura Linney). He appeared on the big screen in films such as Amusement and Losing Control.

Scott co-starred as Dan Egan on HBO's political comedy series Veep.

He also voiced Turbo in the Netflix original animated series Turbo FAST. The series is based on the 2013 film Turbo.

In June 2014, it was reported that Scott had joined the Nancy Meyers film The Intern, as a "smooth-talking, cocky young businessman." However, Scott's character is not in the final cut of the film.

In 2020, Scott played the lead role of David in the NBC drama pilot Echo which was written by JJ Bailey. He played a supporting role as Ben in the 2022 drama film Wildflower.

In November 2023, it was announced that Scott would join Law & Order as Detective Vincent Riley for season 23. He replaces former star Jeffrey Donovan, who exited the series due to creative differences.

== Personal life ==
On June 21, 2014, Scott married his longtime girlfriend, Elspeth Keller. They have two sons, born in 2015 and 2018. Scott’s sister is chef Katianna Hong, who appeared on season 22 of Top Chef.

== Filmography ==
=== Film ===
Year	Film	Role	Notes	Ref.
2006	Bickford Shmeckler's Cool Ideas	Trent		
2007	Passing the Time	Kevin	Short film	
2009	Amusement	Dan		
2009	My Two Fans	Kyle		
2011	Losing Control	Ben		
2013	North Bay	Kirk Floyd	Short film	
2013	Beside Still Waters	Henry		
2014	Missing William	William Leeds		
2014	Sister	Billy Presser		
2014	A Better You	Handsome Model		
2014	Bad Summer	Max		
2015	I'll See You in My Dreams	Officer Shumaker		
2015	Slow Learners	Max		
2016	The Veil	Nick		
2016	Nerdland	Brett Anderson, Butler #2	Voice	
2016	Dean	Brett Smith		
2017	Home Again	Justin Miller		
2018	Under the Eiffel Tower	Liam		
2018	Venom	Dr. Dan Lewis		
2019	Late Night	Tom Campbell		
2019	Black and Blue	Kevin Jennings		
2021	Venom: Let There Be Carnage	Dr. Dan Lewis		
2021	Injustice	Green Arrow	Voice	
2022	Who Invited Charlie?	Phil	Also producer	
2022	Wildflower	Ben		
2023	Merry Little Batman	Commissioner Gordon	Voice; direct-to-streaming film	
2024	The Idea of You	Daniel		
2024	Venom: The Last Dance	Dr. Dan Lewis	Voice (uncredited)	

=== Television ===
Year	Film	Role	Notes	Ref.
2002	That '70s Show	Ted	Episode: "Over the Hills and Far Away"	
2002–2005	American Dreams	Andy Eaton / Brian	4 episodes	
2003	What I Like About You	Hunter	Episode: "Girls Night Out"	
2003	With You In Spirit	Ben Fisher	Television film	
2003–2004	It's All Relative	Bobby O'Neil	Main role	
2004	Revenge of the Middle-Aged Woman	Sam	Television film	
2004	F2: Forensic Factor	Frank Black	Episode: "No Body, No Crime"	
2005	CSI: Crime Scene Investigation	Dax Blanchard	Episode: "Snakes"	
2006–2010	My Boys	Brendan 'Brando' Dorff	Main role	
2007	Bones	Robert Frazier	Episode: "The Man in the Mansion"	
2008	CSI: NY	Seth Riggin	Episode: "Playing with Matches"	
2008	Unhitched	Bobby	Episode: "Woman Marries Horse"	
2009	Celebrities Anonymous	Johnny	Web series	
2009	Hawthorne	Jared	Episode: "No Guts, No Glory"	
2009	The Ex List	Steve Bolla	Episode: "Daphne's Idealized Wedding"	
2009–2011	The Secret Life of the American Teenager	Dr. Jeff Tseguay	9 episodes	
2010	The Big C	Dr. Todd Mauer	Recurring role; seasons 1-2 (10 episodes)	
2011	Mad Love	Dave Evans	Episode: "The Spy Who Loved Me"	
2012	Hot in Cleveland	Sam	Episode: "Hot & Heavy"	
2012	Best Friends Forever	Peter	Episode: "The Butt Dial"	
2012–2013	Motorcity	Mike Chilton	Voice, main role	
2012–2019	Veep	Dan Egan	Main role	
2013	How to Live with Your Parents (For the Rest of Your Life)	Scott	3 episodes	
2013	Perception	Dr. Hutchins	Episode: "Neuropositive"	
2013–2016	Turbo FAST	Turbo, Tyler	Voice, main role	
2014	New Girl	Ted	Episode: "The Last Wedding"	
2015	Zoo	Ethan Boyd	Episode: "First Blood"	
2017	Great News	Jeremy	3 episodes	
2018	Home: Adventures with Tip & Oh	Shawn	Voice, episode: "Shady Shawn"	
2019	Will & Grace	Marcus	2 episodes	
2019	Why Women Kill	Eli Cohen	10 episodes	
2020	Echo	David	TV pilot	
2021	Archibald's Next Big Thing	Cousin Kip	Voice, episode: "Maximum Overdue/Gator's Giving"	
2021	Creepshow	Congressman Evan Miller	Episode: "Drug Traffic"	
2021	Curb Your Enthusiasm	Don Winston Jr.	2 episodes	
2022	Black-ish	Griffin	3 episodes	
2022	The Afterparty	Detective Aldrin Germain	2 episodes	
2022–2023	The Marvelous Mrs. Maisel	Gordon Ford	Main role (season 5); recurring role (season 4)	
2023–2024	My Adventures with Superman	Jonathan Kent	Voice, 4 episodes	
2023	American Horror Stories	Will Caswell	Episode: "Daphne"	
2023–2024	Curses!	Alex Vanderhouven	Voice, main role	
2024–2026	Law & Order	Detective Vincent Riley	Main role: 58 episodes	
2024	Batman: Caped Crusader	Onomatopoeia	Voice, episode: "Moving Target"	
2025	Bat-Fam	Jim Gordon	Voice, 2 episodes	
2026	Law & Order: Special Victims Unit	Detective Vincent Riley	episode: Purity	

== Awards and nominations ==
Year	Association	Category	Work	Result	Ref.
2014	Screen Actors Guild Awards	Outstanding Performance by an Ensemble in a Comedy Series	Veep	Nominated	
2015	Screen Actors Guild Awards	Outstanding Performance by an Ensemble in a Comedy Series	Veep	Nominated	
2016	Screen Actors Guild Awards	Outstanding Performance by an Ensemble in a Comedy Series	Veep	Nominated	
2016	Daytime Emmy Awards	Outstanding Performer in an Animated Program	Turbo FAST	Nominated	
2017	Screen Actors Guild Awards	Outstanding Performance by an Ensemble in a Comedy Series	Veep	Nominated	
2018	Screen Actors Guild Awards	Outstanding Performance by an Ensemble in a Comedy Series	Veep	Won	
