= Odelya Halevi =

Israeli actress (born 1989)

- אודליה הלוי
- Born: February 12, 1989 (age 36); Rosh HaAyin, Israel
- Occupation: Actress
- Years active: 2008–present
- Spouse: Aaron Mazor (m. 2025)

Odelya Halevi (Hebrew: אודליה הלוי; born February 12, 1989) is an Israeli actress who appears on the American drama series Law & Order as Assistant District Attorney Samantha Maroun. She played Angelica in the American TV series Good Trouble, and she also appeared on Good Girls Revolt. She has made appearances in shows such as Mike & Molly, New Girl, NCIS, MacGyver, and Why Women Kill.

== Early life ==
Halevi is the second oldest of six children. She was born in Rosh HaAyin, Israel. Her parents are a teacher and a retired firefighter. She is a Yemenite Jew whose grandparents immigrated to Israel from Yemen. She attended Orthodox girls school as a child. She used to write and perform small plays each month for Rosh Chodesh. “I don’t remember a time when I didn’t want to be an actor,” she said. “It’s the need to be loved and liked, wanting people to look up to you in some way. It’s a validation.”

Halevi completed her one year mandatory military service in the Israeli Defence Force at the age of 19. Halevi obtained a work permit during that same year, and she moved to Los Angeles in order to pursue acting. She briefly returned home to Israel. She ultimately "followed her heart", and she returned to Los Angeles the following year.

== Personal life ==
On May 30 2025, Halevi married luxury real estate agent Aaron Mazor in a destination wedding at Ronit Farm in Tel Aviv.

== Filmography ==
=== Film ===
Year	Title	Character	Notes
2008	Synonymous	Lina	Short film
2015	Women Talking Themselves Out of Sex	Women #4	Short film
2015	The LA Spinster	Max Wilton	Short film
2017	Him and Her	Blue	Short film
2022	Black Adam	Shiruta	

=== Television ===
Year	Title	Role	Notes
2014	Starship Orion	Ariel Saunders	2 episodes
2014	New Girl	Hot Woman	Episode: "Julie Berkman's Older Sister"
2015	Mike & Molly	Waitress	Episode: "The Last Temptation of Mike"
2015	The Bold and the Beautiful	Forrester Employee	1 episode
2016	Good Girls Revolt	Talia	3 episodes
2016	Ice	Ophelia	Episode: "Hyenas"
2016	NCIS	Samira Hassan	Episode: "Enemy Combatant"
2017	Midnight, Texas	Pia	Episode: "Lemuel, Unchained"
2019	MacGyver	Sana	Episode: "Friends + Enemies + Border"
2019	Why Women Kill	Willow	Episode: "I Killed Everyone He Did, But Backwards and in High Heels"
2021	Good Trouble	Angelica	Recurring role (season 3)
2022– present	Law & Order	ADA Samantha Maroun	Main cast (season 21–present)
