= Law & Order (franchise) =

Legal/criminal procedural television franchise

- Created by: Dick Wolf
- Original work: Law & Order
- Owners: Wolf Entertainment; NBCUniversal

Films and television
- Television series: Law & Order; Special Victims Unit; Criminal Intent; Trial by Jury; LA; True Crime; Organized Crime
- Television film: Exiled

Games
- Video games: Dead on the Money; Double or Nothing; Justice Is Served; Criminal Intent; Legacies

Miscellaneous
- Foreign adaptations: Paris enquêtes criminelles; Закон и порядок: Отдел оперативных расследований; Закон и порядок: Преступный умысел; Law & Order: UK; Law & Order Toronto: Criminal Intent
- Related TV series: Homicide: Life on the Street; New York Undercover; Deadline; Crime & Punishment; Conviction; In Plain Sight; Chicago Fire; Chicago P.D.; Chicago Med; Chicago Justice; FBI; FBI: Most Wanted; FBI: International; CIA

Law & Order is a media franchise composed of a number of related American television series created by Dick Wolf and produced by Wolf Entertainment. They were originally broadcast on NBC, and all of them deal with some aspect of the criminal justice system. Together, the original series, its various spin-offs, the TV film, and crossover episodes from other shows constitute over 1,000 hours of programming.

Shared characters and fictional organizations, such as Hudson University and the New York Ledger tabloid newspaper, serve as connecting links between the shows. Many supporting characters, such as district attorneys, psychologists, and medical examiners are also shared among the shows. Occasionally, crossovers of main characters or shared storylines between two of the shows will occur. A few major characters have also left the cast of one show within the franchise only to eventually join another. The music, style, and credits of the shows tend to be similar, with the voice-over in the opening of every series performed by Steven Zirnkilton. The shows share the iconic "dun, dun" sound effect of a jail cell locking, created, along with the theme songs, by Mike Post. Past episodes of the American series are in syndication with local over-the-air stations, along with cable channels such as USA Network and Bravo (both owned by the franchise's production company, NBCUniversal), Skydance's TNT, WGN America, E. W. Scripps Company's network Ion Television, and AMC Networks' SundanceTV and WeTV, showing episodes sometimes up to six times a day. Its ubiquity on the NBCUniversal fledgling streaming platform Peacock ("...19 zillion reruns...") was noted by The Wall Street Journal in January 2024.

The Law & Order "dun, dun" sound

In October 2012, Law & Order: Special Victims Unit showrunner/executive producer Warren Leight said of the future of the Law & Order franchise, "[Dick Wolf and I] sometimes talk in general terms of where (the franchise) could go. I'm curious to see if there's another iteration somewhere down the line", before adding: "We try hard to maintain a certain level of quality which I think is why the shows sustained in reruns so well. And I'd like to believe there's room for another generation in some way." In February 2015, NBC was purported to have interest in bringing back the flagship Law & Order as a limited series. On September 28, 2021, NBC announced that a 21st season had been ordered.

Seven television series make up the Law & Order franchise: Law & Order, Special Victims Unit, Criminal Intent, Trial by Jury, LA, True Crime, and Organized Crime. All series in total amount to 1,463 episodes across 72 seasons of television.

== Current series ==
=== Law & Order (1990–2010; 2022–present) ===
26 seasons, 550 episodes (September 13, 1990 – May 24, 2010; February 24, 2022 – present)

Law & Order, a crime procedural, features both a police investigation of a crime discovered during the cold open, and a prosecution case set forth by the New York County District Attorney, at the Manhattan DA's office. The first thirty minutes of an episode typically features a lead detective trio. On May 14, 2010, NBC announced that it was canceling the original series, although various spin-offs would continue. The series finale aired on May 24, 2010. Wolf briefly attempted to continue the series on cable, but the series "moved into the history books".

On September 28, 2021, NBC announced that a 21st season had been ordered. At the start of season 25, the police team consists of Senior Detective Vincent Riley (Reid Scott), and Lieutenant Jessica Brady (Maura Tierney), while the counterparts on the legal side are: Executive Assistant District Attorney Nolan Price (Hugh Dancy), Assistant District Attorney Samantha Maroun (Odelya Halevi) and Manhattan District Attorney Nicolas Baxter (Tony Goldywn)

=== Law & Order: Special Victims Unit (1999–present) ===
28 seasons, 600 episodes (September 20, 1999 – present)

SVU follows the cases investigated by NYPD Captain Olivia Benson (Mariska Hargitay) and her Manhattan Special Victims Unit colleagues. The show's focus is on detectives who investigate sexually based crimes and crimes against children, the elderly, and the disabled. At the start of season twenty-seven, these detectives included characters Sgt. Odafin Tutuola (Ice-T), Det. Joe Velasco (Octavio Pisano), Det. Terry Bruno (Kevin Kane), Capt. Renee Curry (Aimé Donna Kelly) and Sgt. Amanda Rollins (Kelli Giddish), while Peter Scanavino co-stars as ADA Dominick Carisi Jr.

=== Adapted series ===
==== Law & Order Toronto: Criminal Intent (2024–present) ====
A Canadian series based on Criminal Intent was announced in early June 2023. On October 16, 2023, the cast names were announced: Aden Young, as Detective Sergeant Henry Graff, Kathleen Munroe as Detective Sergeant Frankie Bateman, Karen Robinson as Inspector Vivienne Holness, K. C. Collins as Deputy Crown Attorney Theo Forrester, Nicola Correia-Damude as Forensic Pathologist Dr. Lucy Da Silva, and Araya Mengesha as tech expert Mark Yohannes. The series will have Canadian talent both in front of and behind the camera, including the writing and production departments. While the show will be part of the Law & Order universe, it has yet to be determined whether any crossovers will occur.

The series first season premiered on February 22, 2024, and concluded on May 16, 2024, comprising 10 episodes. In June 2024, it was renewed through its third season.

== Past series ==
=== Law & Order: Criminal Intent (2001–2011) ===
10 seasons, 195 episodes (September 30, 2001 – June 26, 2011)

Criminal Intent focuses on high-profile cases investigated by the Major Case Squad. Special attention is given to the actions of the criminals pursued, often including scenes from the victim's or perpetrator's lives not involving the police, thereby providing a hint as to the "criminal intent". The detectives depicted (Vincent D'Onofrio and Kathryn Erbe for the majority of the series, including the final season) will often attempt to infiltrate the mind of the suspect. Julia Ormond and Jay O. Sanders also star in the tenth season of the series. Unique to the franchise, pairs of detectives alternate episodes during seasons 5–8. On July 15, 2011, USA Network co-president Jeff Wachtel confirmed Law & Order: CI would end with its tenth season.

=== Law & Order: Trial by Jury (2005–2006) ===
1 season, 13 episodes (March 3, 2005 – January 21, 2006)

Trial by Jury, starring Bebe Neuwirth, Amy Carlson, and Jerry Orbach, followed the preparation by the legal teams, both prosecution and defense, for a jury trial. This was the first Law & Order spin-off to be canceled due to low ratings. Orbach's death (which occurred while the show was in production) was another factor in the show's cancellation.

=== Law & Order: LA (2010–2011) ===
1 season, 22 episodes (September 29, 2010 – July 11, 2011)

Originally titled Law & Order: Los Angeles, LA was the first American Law & Order series set outside of New York City. As with the original series, the first half hour of the show focused on the police investigation of a crime discovered in the cold open; the second half took place at the Los Angeles County District Attorney's office and focused on the prosecution of the criminal suspect(s). On May 13, 2011, Law & Order: LA was canceled by NBC after only one season, but its final episode did not air until July 11, 2011.

=== Law & Order True Crime (2017) ===
1 season, 8 episodes (September 26 – November 14, 2017)

In April 2016, Wolf and NBC announced they were working on True Crime, a scripted anthology series that will follow one significant true-to-life case per season. Season one, titled Law & Order True Crime: The Menendez Murders stars Edie Falco as Leslie Abramson, Gaston Villanueva and Gus Halper as Lyle and Erik Menendez. It premiered on September 26, 2017, and concluded its first season on November 14. The series is currently on hiatus.

=== Law & Order: Organized Crime (2021–2025) ===
5 seasons, 75 episodes (April 1, 2021 – June 12, 2025)

Organized Crime followed cases investigated by former SVU detective Elliot Stabler (Christopher Meloni) as part of the task force within the Organized Crime Control Bureau headed by Sergeant Ayanna Bell (Danielle Moné Truitt). The show's focus is on detectives who investigate mobsters and other criminal syndicates. On March 31, 2020, NBC ordered a 13-episode season of a then-untitled Special Victims Unit spin-off starring Meloni as Stabler, now in an NYPD organized crime task force. Meloni had previously starred on SVU from 1999 to 2011. The show's title was confirmed to be Law & Order: Organized Crime. Writer Craig Gore was fired from the series in June following backlash from a social media post. When NBC announced its fall schedule on June 16, Organized Crime was the only new show on the schedule, slotted for Thursdays at 10 p.m. Eastern. Due to filming stoppages related to COVID-19, the season was shortened to eight episodes and premiered on April 1, 2021. At the start of season four, other detectives included characters detective Jet Slootmaekers (Ainsley Seiger) and detective Bobby Reyes (Rick Gonzalez). In April 2026, it was announced the series would not return for a sixth season.

== In development/unproduced series ==
=== Law & Order: Hate Crimes ===
In September 2018, NBC announced that it had given an order of 13 episodes for a new installment of the franchise, titled Law & Order: Hate Crimes, which would be introduced on Law & Order: SVU. Later, on March 4, 2019, NBC said that the series would be heading back into redevelopment to flesh out the concept and such an introduction on SVU would not take place. The series was once again touted in 2020 as part of a multi-year contract signed with creator Dick Wolf. The series would likely move to Peacock due to language concerns as of June 2020.

=== Law & Order: For the Defense ===
NBC had given a straight-to-series order to Law & Order: For the Defense on May 3, 2021, a new legal drama from creator Wolf that would take a look inside a criminal defense firm. The premise of the ordered series was to put defense attorneys under the microscope, along with the criminal justice system, with every week delivering the promise of a contemporary morality tale. On May 14, NBC announced that the series would premiere during the 2021–22 television season, leading off a trio of Law & Order franchise series on Thursdays in the same manner as the network's Wednesday Chicago grouping. On July 15, multiple trade publications reported that NBC and Wolf had mutually agreed to scrap the series, which had not yet cast any roles, and that a different Law & Order–related program, later revealed as the revival of the original series, was in the works.

== Media ==
=== TV film ===
The Law & Order franchise has one TV film, Exiled: A Law & Order Movie (1998). Chris Noth reprises his role as Mike Logan, as the film explores what happened to the character following his departure from the original series.

=== TV special ===
To commemorate the 21st season of SVU, the television special The Paley Center Salutes Law & Order: SVU was ordered and produced to celebrate the record breaking season and endurance and cultural significance of the show.

Another TV special titled The Paley Center Presents Law & Order: Before They Were Stars premiered on November 12, 2020, preceding the premiere of SVU season 22.

=== Books ===
The franchise has branched out to books, with novels written by Robert Vaughan (under the pseudonym, Jack Gregory), J. Madison Davis, and William P. Wood.

- Law & Order: In Deep (1993) by Jack Gregory
- Law & Order: Black Out (1993) by Jack Gregory
- Law & Order: Dead End (1994) by Jack Gregory
- Law & Order: Dead Line (2002) by J. Madison Davis
- Law & Order: Drop Dead (2002) by William P. Wood

=== Video games ===
The franchise has also spawned a series of video games for the PC, which feature appearances by then-current cast members of the TV series.

The typical course of most of the games follows the original series' format with the player investigating a crime with interviews of witnesses and examination of evidence. After the arrest is made, the player then prosecutes the case with challenges such as selecting appropriate questions for witnesses on the stand, recognizing improper questions to raise objections and selecting the most persuasive arguments for the judge to allow certain evidence in court.

- Law & Order: Dead on the Money
- Law & Order: Double or Nothing
- Law & Order: Justice Is Served
- Law & Order: Criminal Intent
- Law & Order: Legacies

== Crossovers ==
In the criminal justice system, some killers are so depraved that it takes multiple police agencies to bring them to justice.
This is one of those investigations.

— Special crossover opening narration spoken by Steven Zirnkilton

The following table lists all the crossover stories in the Law & Order franchise.

Crossover between			Episode title	Actors appearing in other series	Date broadcast	Description	Type
Series A	Series B	Series C	Episode title	Actors appearing in other series	Date broadcast	Description	Type
Homicide: Life on the Street	Law & Order	—N/a	"Law & Disorder" (Homicide: Life on the Street S03E16)	Appears in Series A: Chris Noth	Feb 24, 1995	Det. Mike Logan meets with Pembleton to hand over a fugitive who fled from Baltimore to New York City.	Cameo
New York; Undercover	Law & Order	—N/a	"Smack Is Back" (New York Undercover S03E07)	Appears in Series A: Carolyn McCormick	Nov 7, 1996	After an on-the-job incident, Detective Nina Moreno goes to Dr. Elizabeth Olivet for counseling.	Guest appearance
Law & Order	Homicide: Life on the Street	—N/a	"Charm City" (Law & Order S06E13) "For God and Country" (Homicide S04E11)	Appears in Series A: Richard Belzer, Kyle Secor, Andre Braugher; Appears in Series B: Benjamin Bratt, Jerry Orbach, Jill Hennessy	Feb 7, 1996; Feb 9, 1996	Briscoe and Curtis clash with Pembleton and Bayliss, who have come to New York to investigate a subway explosion resembling an unsolved bombing in Baltimore.	Two-part crossover
Law & Order	Homicide: Life on the Street	—N/a	"Baby, It's You" (Law & Order S08E06) (Homicide S06E05)	Appears in Series A: Richard Belzer, Jon Seda, Yaphet Kotto, Željko Ivanek; Appears in Series B: Benjamin Bratt, Jerry Orbach, Sam Waterston, Carey Lowell	Nov 12, 1997; Nov 14, 1997	Falsone and Munch team up with Briscoe and Curtis to investigate the murder of a 14-year-old girl. They trace the suspect from New York back to Baltimore.	Two-part crossover
Law & Order	Homicide: Life on the Street	—N/a	"Sideshow" (Law & Order S09E14) (Homicide S07E15)	Appears in Series A: Richard Belzer, Michael Michele, Željko Ivanek; Appears in Series B: Benjamin Bratt, Jerry Orbach, Sam Waterston	Feb 17, 1999; Feb 19, 1999	Briscoe and Curtis re-team up with Munch and Sheppard to investigate the murder of a government worker and expose a connection to the White House.	Two-part crossover
Law & Order: SVU	Law & Order	—N/a	"...Or Just Look Like One" (SVU S01E03)	Appears in Series A: Jesse L. Martin, Jerry Orbach, Carolyn McCormick	Oct 4, 1999	Detectives Briscoe and Green assist the 16th precinct when their homicide victim was also a witness in an SVU case. Meanwhile, Detective Stabler seeks the advice from Dr. Olivet regarding his daughter and anorexia.	Guest appearance
Law & Order: SVU	Law & Order	—N/a	"Entitled" (SVU S01E15) (Law & Order S10E14)	Appears in Series A: Angie Harmon, Steven Hill, Jesse L. Martin, Jerry Orbach, Sam Waterston; Appears in Series B: Dann Florek, Mariska Hargitay, Christopher Meloni, Richard Belzer	Feb 18, 2000	The detectives of SVU team with the 27th Precinct to investigate a salesman's murder, leading them to a politically influential family. When the case goes to court, McCoy finds the matriarch to be a formidable opponent.	Two-part crossover
Law & Order	Law & Order: SVU	—N/a	"Fools for Love" (Law & Order S10E15)	Appears in Series A: Mariska Hargitay, Christopher Meloni	Feb 23, 2000	Detectives Benson and Stabler assist the 27th precinct in tracking down a murder suspect.	Guest appearance
Law & Order: Criminal Intent	Law & Order	—N/a	"One" (Criminal Intent S01E01)	Appears in Series A: Dianne Wiest	Sep 30, 2001	Detective Goren and ADA Carver work to assure DA Nora Lewin's confidence in their handling of a murder case.	Guest appearance
Law & Order: Criminal Intent	Law & Order	—N/a	"Poison" (Criminal Intent S01E07)	Appears in Series A: Jesse L. Martin, Jerry Orbach	Nov 11, 2001	Major Case Detectives Goren and Eames talk to Homicide Detectives Briscoe and Green about a homicide case that may be connected to their cyanide poisoning case.	Guest appearance
Law & Order: Criminal Intent	Law & Order	—N/a	"Badge" (Criminal Intent S01E20)	Appears in Series A: S. Epatha Merkerson	Apr 28, 2002	Detectives Goren and Eames question Lt. Anita Van Buren about a former police officer she wrote a letter of recommendation for who is now a suspect in a string of murders.	Guest appearance
Law & Order	Law & Order: Trial by Jury	—N/a	"Tombstone" (Law & Order S15E20) "Skeleton" (Trial by Jury S01E08)	Appears in Series B: Dennis Farina, Jesse L. Martin, S. Epatha Merkerson, Sam Waterston, Richard Belzer	Apr 13 & 15, 2005	Green is shot while taking a murder witness to trial, leading Fontana to team up with Salazar and uncover ties to a porn magnate.	Two-part crossover
Law & Order: SVU	Law & Order: Trial by Jury	—N/a	"Night" (SVU S06E20) "Day" (Trial by Jury S01E11)	Appears in Series A: Bebe Neuwirth, Kirk Acevedo, Fred Thompson; Appears in Series B: Christopher Meloni, Mariska Hargitay, Diane Neal, Tamara Tunie, Carolyn McCormick	May 3, 2005	A man is suspected of rape and facts about his adolescence are revealed at his trial.	Two-part crossover
Law & Order: SVU	Law & Order	—N/a	"Design" (SVU S07E02) "Flaw" (Law & Order S16E02)	Appears in Series B: Mariska Hargitay, Ice-T	Sep 27–28, 2005	A mother-daughter con team get away with fraud, then are tried for murder.	Two-part crossover
Conviction	Law & Order	—N/a	"Pilot" (Conviction S01E01)	Appears in Series A: Fred Thompson	Mar 3, 2006	When an ADA is assassinated, Alexandra Cabot begins work as a New York Bureau Chief, while DA Branch rallies the troops.	Cameo
Law & Order: Criminal Intent	In Plain Sight	—N/a	"Contract" (Criminal Intent S07E12)	Appears in Series A: Mary McCormack	Jun 15, 2008	When a celebrity gossip columnist is murdered, Deputy Marshall Mary Shannon's investigation into suspect Frank Chess leads her to Logan and Wheeler in New York.	Cameo
Law & Order: SVU	Law & Order: LA	—N/a	"Behave" (SVU S12E03)	Appears in Series A: Skeet Ulrich	Sep 29, 2010	Detective Olivia Benson works with LAPD Detective Rex Winters in Los Angeles to uncover evidence to help convict a rapist back in New York.	Guest appearance
Law & Order: SVU	Law & Order: LA	—N/a	"Reparations" (SVU S12E21)	Appears in Series A: Terrence Howard	Apr 6, 2011	Deputy DA Joe Dekker heads to New York from LA to defend his cousin when he's accused of rape.	Guest appearance
Law & Order: SVU	Law & Order: Criminal Intent	—N/a	"Acceptable Loss" (SVU S14E04)	Appears in Series A: Kathryn Erbe	Oct 17, 2012	Following her departure from the Major Case Squad, Joint Task Force Lieutenant Alexandra Eames intercepts the SVU's investigation into sex trafficking when one of the victims is suspected of terrorism.	Guest appearance
Law & Order: SVU	Law & Order: Criminal Intent	—N/a	"Poisoned Motive" (SVU S14E22)	Appears in Series A: Kathryn Erbe	May 8, 2013	When Rollins becomes the victim of a sniper, Alexandra Eames once again unites with Benson to investigate the Homeland aspects of the case.	Guest appearance
Law & Order: SVU	Homicide: Life on the Street	—N/a	"Wonderland Story" (SVU S15E05)	Appears in Series A: Clark Johnson	Oct 16, 2013	Baltimore Detective Meldrick Lewis heads to New York to attend the retirement party of his former colleague, John Munch.	Cameo
Law & Order: SVU	Law & Order: LA	—N/a	"Jersey Breakdown" (SVU S15E12)	Appears in Series A: Alana de la Garza	Jan 22, 2014	ADA Barba seeks the help from former LA DDA Connie Rubirosa, who's now an Assistant U.S. Attorney.	Guest appearance
Law & Order: SVU	Chicago P.D.	—N/a	"Comic Perversion" (SVU S15E15) "Conventions" (Chicago P.D. S01E06)	Appears in Series A: Sophia Bush; Appears in Series B: Ice-T, Kelli Giddish, David Eigenberg	Feb 26, 2014	Chicago detective Erin Lindsay asks the NYPD for help in solving a series of rapes and murders, so Tutuola and Rollins head to Chicago to help Voight and Antonio catch the culprit.	Two-part crossover
Chicago Fire	Law & Order: SVU	Chicago P.D.	"Nobody Touches Anything" (Chicago Fire S03E07) "Chicago Crossover" (SVU S16E07) "They'll Have to Go Through Me" (Chicago P.D. S02E07)	Appears in Series A: Jason Beghe, Sophia Bush, Kelli Giddish; Appears in Series B: Jason Beghe, Sophia Bush, Jesse Lee Soffer; Appears in Series C: Mariska Hargitay, Danny Pino, Kelli Giddish	Nov 11–12, 2014	When Firehouse 51 rescues the owner of a house on fire, they find him clutching a suspicious box, so the Intelligence Unit is brought in for further investigation, leading them to work with SVU to take down a child pornography ring.	Three-part crossover
Chicago Fire	Chicago P.D.	Law & Order: SVU	"We Called Her Jellybean" (Chicago Fire S03E21) "The Number of Rats" (Chicago P.D. S02E20) "Daydream Believer" (SVU S16E20)	Appears in Series A: Jason Beghe, Jon Seda, Mariska Hargitay, Tamara Tunie; Appears in Series B: Mariska Hargitay, Danny Pino, Ice-T, Peter Scanavino, Jesse Spencer, Eamonn Walker, Nick Gehlfuss; Appears in Series C: Jason Beghe, Sophia Bush, Jesse Lee Soffer, Marina Squerciati, Brian Geraghty	Apr 28–29, 2015	An apartment fire connected to a case of attempted rape and murder in Chicago resembles an unsolved case in New York, so SVU and Intelligence work together to find the suspect.	Three-part crossover
Law & Order: SVU	Chicago P.D.	—N/a	"Nationwide Manhunt" (SVU S17E14) "The Song of Gregory William Yates" (Chicago P.D. S03E14)	Appears in Series A: Jason Beghe, Sophia Bush, Jon Seda; Appears in Series B: Mariska Hargitay, Ice-T, Eamonn Walker, Brian Tee	Feb 10, 2016	Chicago detectives come to New York to assist in the hunt for two escaped murderers, one of whom is Greg Yates, who returns to Chicago and commits a triple homicide, so SVU detectives go to Chicago to join in the investigation.	Two-part crossover
Chicago Justice	Law & Order	Chicago P.D.	"Uncertainty Principle" (Chicago Justice S01E02)	Appears in Series A: Richard Brooks, Jason Beghe, Marina Squerciati, LaRoyce Hawkins, Amy Morton	Mar 5, 2017	At the request of Sgt. Hank Voight, Defense Attorney Paul Robinette travels to Chicago to defend Officer Kevin Atwater and faces off against ASA Peter Stone, the son of his former colleague Ben Stone.	Guest appearance
Law & Order: SVU	Chicago; Justice	Law & Order	"The Undiscovered Country" (SVU S19E13)	Appears in Series A: Philip Winchester, Sam Waterston	Feb 7, 2018	After traveling to New York to attend his father's funeral, Chicago ASA Peter Stone accepts an offer from Jack McCoy to work for the DA's office. His first case is the prosecution of ADA Rafael Barba.	Guest appearance
Law & Order: SVU	Chicago; Justice	—N/a	"Zero Tolerance" (SVU S20E03)	Appears in Series A: Carl Weathers	Oct 4, 2018	After an illegal immigrant child is separated from her mother, ADA Stone seeks out the help from his former boss, Chicago State's Attorney Mark Jefferies, to reunite them.	Guest appearance
Law & Order: SVU	Law & Order: Criminal Intent	—N/a	"Hunt, Trap, Rape and Release" (SVU S22E07)	Appears in Series A: Annabella Sciorra	Feb 18, 2021	Benson and the squad team up with former Major Case Squad detective Carolyn Barek, who's the new Bronx SVU Lieutenant, when a serial rapist strikes in Manhattan.	Guest appearance
Law & Order: SVU	Law & Order: Organized Crime	—N/a	"Return of the Prodigal Son" (SVU S22E09) "What Happens in Puglia" (Organized Crime S01E01)	Appears in Series A: Christopher Meloni; Appears in Series B: Mariska Hargitay	Apr 1, 2021	The squad rallies around former SVU Detective Eliot Stabler after threat is made on his family.	Two-part crossover
Law & Order: Organized Crime	Law & Order: SVU	—N/a	"Not Your Father's Organized Crime" (Organized Crime S01E02)	Appears in Series A: Mariska Hargitay	Apr 8, 2021	Stabler chats with Benson in her car about their awkward meeting in the lobby and the fact that Stabler is suffering from PTSD.	Guest appearance
Law & Order: Organized Crime	Law & Order: SVU	—N/a	"The Stuff That Dreams Are Made Of" (Organized Crime S01E04)	Appears in Series A: Mariska Hargitay, Peter Scanavino	Apr 22, 2021	Carisi assists Stabler and Ayanna Bell with getting Izak Bekhar to work with them to bring down Richard Wheatley. Benson helps Stabler's children in staging an intervention for Stabler to deal with his PTSD.	Guest appearance
Law & Order: SVU	Law & Order: Organized Crime	—N/a	"Trick-Rolled at the Moulin" (SVU S22E013) "An Inferior Product" (Organized Crime S01E05)	Appears in Series A: Christopher Meloni; Appears in Series B: Mariska Hargitay, Demore Barnes	May 13, 2021	After a string of drug related crimes, Benson and Stabler work together to solve the case.	Two-part crossover
Law & Order: SVU	Law & Order: Organized Crime	—N/a	"I Thought You Were on My Side" (SVU S23E03)	Appears in Series A: Christopher Meloni, Danielle Moné Truitt	Sep 30, 2021	Benson and Rollins must contend with the FBI and the Organized Crime bureau when a rape victim identifies a dangerous mobster as her assailant.	Guest appearance
Law & Order: Organized Crime	Law & Order: SVU	—N/a	"The Outlaw Eddie Wagner" (Organized Crime S02E03)	Appears in Series A: Mariska Hargitay	Sep 30, 2021	Stabler shows up at Benson's home after having been drugged while undercover.	Guest appearance
Law & Order: SVU	Law & Order: Organized Crime	—N/a	"Fast Times @TheWheelHouse" (SVU S23E05) "The Good, The Bad, and The Lovely" (Organized Crime S02E05)	Appears in Series A: Danielle Moné Truitt, Ainsley Seiger; Appears in Series B: Mariska Hargitay, Ice-T	Oct 14, 2021	SVU and Organized Crime work together to take down an Albanian sex trafficking ring.	Guest appearance (Note: While neither episode was marketed as an official two part crossover, one overlapping story arc is present in both episodes and part of why characters are crossing over.)
Law & Order: SVU	Law & Order: Organized Crime	—N/a	"People vs. Richard Wheatley" (SVU S23E09) "The Christmas Episode" (Organized Crime S02E09)	Appears in Series A: Christopher Meloni, Danielle Moné Truitt, Tamara Taylor, Dylan McDermott; Appears in Series B: Mariska Hargitay, Raúl Esparza	Dec 9, 2021	Carisi tries Richard Wheatley for the murder of Kathy Stabler while Benson finds herself at odds with a friend when Rafael Barba agrees to take the case.	Two-part crossover
Law & Order: Organized Crime	Law & Order: SVU	—N/a	"Takeover" (Organized Crime S02E15)	Appears in Series A: Mariska Hargitay	Mar 10, 2022	Benson helps Stabler and Ayanna Bell establish Stabler's undercover role.	Guest appearance
Law & Order: Organized Crime	Law & Order: SVU	—N/a	"Can't Knock the Hustle" (Organized Crime S02E17)	Appears in Series A: Dann Florek	Apr 17, 2022	Stabler visits former SVU Captain Donald Cragen at his home to discuss Stabler's father.	Guest appearance
Law & Order: SVU	Law & Order: Organized Crime	—N/a	"Did You Believe in Miracles?" (SVU S23E20) "Lost One" (Organized Crime S02E20)	Appears in Series A: Christopher Meloni; Appears in Series B: Mariska Hargitay, Octavio Pisano	May 6, 2022	SVU and Organized Crime search for an abducted 9-year-old girl.	Two-part crossover
Law & Order	Law & Order: SVU	—N/a	"Black and Blue" (Law & Order S21E10)	Appears in Series A: Mariska Hargitay	May 19, 2022	Det. Cosgrove asks Captain Olivia Benson for help solving a case.	Guest appearance
Law & Order: Organized Crime	Law & Order: SVU	—N/a	"Friend or Foe" (Organized Crime S02E22)	Appears in Series A: Dann Florek	May 19, 2022	Former SVU Captain Donald Cragen appears at Stabler's Combat Medal ceremony.	Cameo
Law & Order: Organized Crime	Law & Order: SVU	Law & Order	"Gimme Shelter" (Organized Crime S03E01) (SVU S24E01) (Law & Order S22E01)	Appears in Series A: Mariska Hargitay, Kelli Giddish, Octavio Pisano, Jeffrey Donovan, Mehcad Brooks, Camryn Manheim; Appears in Series B: Christopher Meloni, Danielle Moné Truitt, Ainsley Seiger, Jeffrey Donovan, Mehcad Brooks, Camryn Manheim; Appears in Series C: Mariska Hargitay, Christopher Meloni, Kelli Giddish, Peter Scanavino, Ainsley Seiger	Sep 22, 2022	The shooting of a girl in cold blood is traced to an international crime ring.	Three-part crossover
Law & Order: Organized Crime	Law & Order: SVU	—N/a	"Behind Blue Eyes" (Organized Crime S03E05)	Appears in Series A: Kelli Giddish	Oct 17, 2022	Amanda Rollins brings Stabler into a case where two girls are raped by two people who are dressed as cops who are suspected to be linked to the Brotherhood.	Guest appearance
Law & Order: SVU	Law & Order: Organized Crime	—N/a	"Bad Things" (SVU S24E21) "Shadowërk" (Organized Crime S03E21) "All Pain Is One Malady" (SVU S24E22) "With Many Names" (Organized Crime S03E22)	Appears in Series A: Christopher Meloni, Ainsley Seiger, Brent Antonello, Rick Gonzalez; Appears in Series B: Mariska Hargitay, Ice-T, Peter Scanavino, Octavio Pisano, Molly Burnett, Kelli Giddish	May 11–18, 2023	When DNA from a Special Victims Unit rape investigation connects to an OCCB unsolved murder, Stabler and Benson uncover a revenge-for-hire scheme on the dark web. Bell and Slootmaekers follow the money trail to expose the website's anonymous creator.	Four-part crossover
Law & Order: Organized Crime	Law & Order: SVU	—N/a	"Original Sin" (Organized Crime S04E07)	Appears in Series A: Dann Florek	March 14, 2024	Former SVU Captain Donald Cragen appears	Cameo
Law & Order: Organized Crime	Law & Order: SVU	—N/a	"Sins of Our Fathers" (Organized Crime S04E08)	Appears in Series A: Dann Florek	March 21, 2024	Former SVU Captain Donald Cragen appears	Cameo
Law & Order	Law & Order: SVU	—N/a	"Play with Fire" (Law & Order S24E19) (SVU S26E19)	Appears in Series A: Mariska Hargitay, Peter Scanavino, Kevin Kane, Juliana Aidén Martinez; Appears in Series B: Hugh Dancy, Tony Goldwyn, Maura Tierney	April 18, 2025	TBA	Two-part crossover

=== John Munch crossovers ===
The character John Munch, who originated on Homicide: Life on the Street, is notable for either appearing in or being referenced in a wide variety of other series, ranging from appearing in the science fiction series The X-Files, to the sitcom Arrested Development, to being referenced by name in the British crime drama Luther.

== Other related series ==
New York Undercover (1994–1998)

Co-created by Kevin Arkadie and Dick Wolf, NYU was implicitly a part of the same universe as the franchise, as psychologist and psychiatrist characters from L&O appeared in the series and there were glimpses of the franchise's fictional newspaper, the New York Ledger.

Deadline (2000–2001)

Also created by Dick Wolf, featured reporters based at the New York Ledger.

Conviction (2006)

This series starred Stephanie March as Alexandra Cabot, Anson Mount as Jim Steele, Eric Balfour as Brian Peluso, J. August Richards as Billy Desmond, Milena Govich as Jessica Rossi, Julianne Nicholson as Christina Finn, and Jordan Bridges as Nick Potter. March reprises her role of Cabot originally from SVU and is now the Homicide Bureau Chief ADA. Cabot would return to SVU after this show's end. The series features a larger ensemble cast of young ADAs, with no police, therapists or medical examiners in lead roles. After its cancellation, two of the show's actresses, Milena Govich and Julianne Nicholson, went on to star in Law & Order and Law & Order: Criminal Intent respectively as Detectives Nina Cassady and Megan Wheeler.

== Foreign adaptations ==
The franchise, as a result of its popularity, has led to the adaptation of scripts from the American series into foreign-produced series. These are:

Paris enquêtes criminelles (Paris Criminal Investigations)

3 seasons, 20 episodes (May 3, 2007 – November 6, 2008)

Paris Criminal Investigations follows the format of Law & Order: Criminal Intent, adapted to Paris and the French legal system, with detectives from the Prefecture of Police DRPJ and the Ministère public attempting to secure a conviction. The series stars Vincent Pérez, Sandrine Rigaux, Jacques Pater, Hélène Godec, Laure Killing, and Audrey Looten. The show is also aired in Germany on ZDF, under the title Law & Order: Paris.

Закон и Порядок. Отдел оперативных расследований (Law & Order: Division of Field Investigation)

4 seasons, 84 episodes (2007–2011)

Division of Field Investigations follows the format of Law & Order: Special Victims Unit, set in Moscow and adapted to the Russian justice system. The series stars Ivan Oganesyan, Alisa Bogart, Dmitry Brusnikin, Alexander Naumov, Valery Troshin, and Xenia Entelis.

Закон и Порядок. Преступный умысел (Law & Order: Criminal Intent)

4 seasons, 84 episodes (2007–2011)

Criminal Intent follows the format of Law & Order: Criminal Intent, set in Moscow and is adapted to the Russian Justice System. The series stars Mikhail Homyakov, Igor Lagutin, Elena Kovalchuk and Boris Mironov.

Law & Order: UK

5 series, 53 episodes (February 23, 2009 – June 11, 2014)

UK follows the format of the original Law & Order show but adapts it to the new setting of London, with detectives from the Metropolitan Police CID and the Crown Prosecution Service attempting to secure a conviction. The series stars Bradley Walsh, Jamie Bamber, Harriet Walter, Ben Daniels, Freema Agyeman, Bill Paterson, Paul Nicholls, Dominic Rowan, Georgia Taylor, Peter Davison, Sharon Small, Paterson Joseph, and Ben Bailey Smith.

Code of Law

5 seasons, 59 episodes (September 20, 2012 – June 22, 2020)

An unofficial adaptation by Mediacorp Channel 5 follows the format of the original Law & Order series, but changes the setting to Singapore in the 2010s, with detectives from the Singapore Police Force and "the best criminal lawyers in town" who "fight to present the best case in court for the Accused". The series stars Sunny Pang and Fauzie Laily as the detectives and Keagan Kang and Joanne Peh in the legal side. Code of Law also has two spin-off series, a Malay-language series entitled Forensik and an English-language series entitled Derek, and a spin-off movie entitled Derek: The Movie. It also had a prequel, The Pupil, which aired for two seasons of 26 episodes between January 7, 2010 and November 8, 2011, and which in turn was based on the Law & Order spinoff, Conviction.

== Series timeline ==
Series	Television seasons																																							No. of Episodes
Series	1990–91	1991–92	1992–93	1993–94	1994–95	1995–96	1996–97	1997–98	1998–99	1999–2000	2000–01	2001–02	2002–03	2003–04	2004–05	2005–06	2006–07	2007–08	2008–09	2009–10	2010–11			2011–12	2012–13	2013–14	2014–15	2015–16	2016–17	2017–18	2018–19	2019–20	2020–21	2021–22	2022–23	2023–24	2024–25	2025–26	2026–27	No. of Episodes
Series	Franchise																																							1,543
L&O	1	2	3	4	5	6	7	8	9	10	11	12	13	14	15	16	17	18	19	20														21	22	23	24	25	26	553
SVU										1	2	3	4	5	6	7	8	9	10	11	12			13	14	15	16	17	18	19	20	21	22	23	24	25	26	27	28	608
CI												1	2	3	4	5	6	7	8	9	10																			195
TBJ															1																									13
UK																			1	2	3	4	5	6	7	8														53
TCI																																				1	2	3	4	16
LA																					1																			22
TC																														1										8
OC																																	1	2	3	4	5			75
	Universe																																							1,488
HLOTS			1	2	3	4	5	6	7																															122
NYU					1	2	3	4																																89
DL											1																													13
Con																1																								13
IPS																		1	2	3	4			5																61
Jo																									1															8
Fire																									1	2	3	4	5	6	7	8	9	10	11	12	13	14	15	303
P.D.																										1	2	3	4	5	6	7	8	9	10	11	12	13	14	273
Med																												1	2	3	4	5	6	7	8	9	10	11	12	224
Justice																													1											13
FBI																															1	2	3	4	5	6	7	8	9	166
MW																																1	2	3	4	5	6			108
Intl																																		1	2	3	4			78
CIA																																						1	2	18
	Total																																							3,031

- CIA

== Location ==
=== Setting ===
Most of the American series have been filmed almost entirely in the New York City area. The fictional Hudson University is a recurring location across multiple series in the franchise, based on an amalgam of Columbia University and New York University, with some other colleges appearing as additional filming locations. Hudson University has also appeared less frequently in many other television series and movies, and is a fictional college in the DC universe.

The original Law & Order series has filmed a few episodes in the Los Angeles area and Baltimore; these episodes or portions of episodes were set in the cities in which they were filmed and concerned multi-jurisdictional investigations or extradition. Law & Order: LA expanded the franchise to a new main city, the new series' namesake. L&O: LA was canceled after one season.

=== Effects on casting ===
With some frequency, actors have appeared on the various series that make up the franchise, usually as different (sometimes very different) characters. This is because filming occurs in the New York City area and thus draws from the same pool of actors. Some prominent examples of the same actor playing different roles in different episodes are:

- S. Epatha Merkerson playing a maid whose child was killed in a season 1 episode of the original L&O before joining the cast in season 4 as Lieutenant Anita Van Buren and going on to be the second longest-serving cast member of the parent series. Merkerson also plays Sharon Goodwin in the Chicago franchise, which has shared numerous crossovers with SVU.
- Camryn Manheim appeared in three episodes of the original L&O in the first, third, and fourth seasons as three different characters before joining the main cast as Lieutenant Kate Dixon in the series' 21st season after being rebooted in 2022.
- Diane Neal playing a female rapist in an earlier season of Special Victims Unit before becoming the Assistant District Attorney for that series.
- Annabella Sciorra playing a criminal defense attorney in Trial by Jury and later Det. Carolyn Barek, Det. Mike Logan's (Chris Noth) partner, in Criminal Intent.
- Jerry Orbach playing a defense attorney on the original series before joining it as Det. Lennie Briscoe.
- Ice-T playing a pimp known as Seymour Stockton in the franchise's only film, Exiled: A Law & Order Movie, before taking on the role of Tutuola on SVU.
- Anthony Anderson playing Detective Lucius Blaine in a seventh-season episode of SVU before playing Bernard on the original Law & Order.
- Annie Parisse played an exotic dancer in season 12 before joining the cast as Alexandra Borgia at the start of season 15.
- Jeremy Sisto played a defense attorney in the last episode of season 17 before joining the cast as Cyrus Lupo at the start of season 18. Sisto also plays Jubal Valentine in the FBI franchise.
- Kelli Giddish played two different characters on Criminal Intent and SVU before joining the show in season 13 as Amanda Rollins.
- Raúl Esparza played different characters on Law & Order and Criminal Intent before joining SVU in its 14th season as Assistant District Attorney Rafael Barba.
- Peter Scanavino played multiple characters in Law & Order, Criminal Intent, Trial by Jury and SVU before joining the cast in season 16 as Dominick Carisi.
- Rick Gonzalez played a burglar in a season 1 episode of SVU before joining Organized Crime in season 3 as Detective Bobby Reyes.
- Tony Goldwyn played Frank Goren in four episodes of Criminal Intent before joining the cast of Law & Order as D.A. Nicholas Baxter.
- Jim Gaffigan, better known for his stand-up comedy routines which sometimes mention life in his family's New York City apartment, has appeared in five episodes of the franchise. In the original series as person of interest George Rozakis (1998, S9E4 "Flight") and murder suspect Larry Johnson (2009, S20E4 "Reality Bites"). In the SVU series he played Oliver Tunney, a kidnapping suspect (2001, S2E15 "Countdown"), and he appeared twice in Criminal Intent, shady crematorium operator Russel Matthews (2002, S2E1 "Dead") and corrupt FDA official Marty Palin (2007, S7E3 "Smile").

Also due to the New York filming, a number of actors appearing in Law & Order shows have had regular or recurring roles on soaps. Most notable is Tamara Tunie, who simultaneously played both medical examiner Melinda Warner on SVU as well as (until 2007) District Attorney Jessica Griffin on As the World Turns. Likewise, New York theater actors have also been frequently cast.

Also as the result of sharing the same pool of New York–based television actors, the series' casts have had significant overlap with that of the former HBO series Oz. This is perhaps most pronounced in Law & Order: Special Victims Unit, whose cast has included three regularly credited actors (Christopher Meloni, BD Wong and Dean Winters), as well as two recurring actors (J. K. Simmons and Mike Doyle) who were also regularly credited actors on Oz, also Kathryn Erbe from Oz starring in Law & Order: Criminal Intent. Similarly, Law & Order: UK sees significant overlap with other programs' casts; most prominently series regulars Freema Agyeman and Peter Davison, who starred in Doctor Who as companion Martha Jones and the Fifth Doctor as well as Bradley Walsh who joined the show at the same time as Jodie Whittaker the Thirteenth Doctor as her companion Graham O'Brien.

== Characters in the franchise ==
=== Police ===
Series	Character	Portrayed by	Law & Order franchise						Universe	Chicago franchise	
Series	Character	Portrayed by	L&O	SVU	CI	TBJ	LA	OC	HLOTS	Fire	P.D.
Law & Order	Max Greevey	George Dzundza	Main								
Law & Order	Mike Logan	Chris Noth (Note: Chris Noth joined the main cast of Criminal Intent following his departure from Law & Order.) (Note: Additionally, the characters of Mike Logan, Lennie Briscoe, Rey Curtis, Don Cragen and Anita Van Buren appear in the 1998 TV film Exiled: A Law & Order Movie.)	Main		Main				Guest		
Law & Order	Donald Cragen	Dann Florek (Note: Dann Florek joined the main cast of SVU following his departure from Law & Order.)	Main	Main				Guest			
Law & Order	Phil Cerreta	Paul Sorvino	Main								
Law & Order	Lennie Briscoe	Jerry Orbach (Note: Jerry Orbach joined the main cast of Trial by Jury following his departure from Law & Order.)	Main	Guest	Guest	Main			Guest		
Law & Order	Anita Van Buren	S. Epatha Merkerson	Main		Guest	Guest					
Law & Order	Rey Curtis	Benjamin Bratt	Main						Guest		
Law & Order	Ed Green	Jesse L. Martin	Main	Guest	Guest	Guest					
Law & Order	Joe Fontana	Dennis Farina	Main			Guest					
Law & Order	Nick Falco	Michael Imperioli	Main								
Law & Order	Nina Cassady	Milena Govich	Main								
Law & Order	Cyrus Lupo	Jeremy Sisto	Main								
Law & Order	Kevin Bernard	Anthony Anderson	Main								
Law & Order	Frank Cosgrove	Jeffrey Donovan	Main	Guest				Guest			
Law & Order	Kate Dixon	Camryn Manheim	Main	Guest				Guest			
Law & Order	Jalen Shaw	Mehcad Brooks	Main	Guest				Guest			
Law & Order	Vincent Riley	Reid Scott	Main	Guest							
Law & Order	Jessica Brady	Maura Tierney	Main	Guest							
Law & Order	Theo Walker	David Ajala	Main	Guest							
SVU	Elliot Stabler	Christopher Meloni (Note: Christopher Meloni starred Detective Elliot Stabler in SVU prior to joining the main cast of Oranized Crime.)	Guest	Main		Guest		Main			
SVU	Olivia Benson	Mariska Hargitay	Guest	Main		Guest		Guest		Guest	Guest
SVU	John Munch	Richard Belzer (Note: Belzer starred as Detective John Munch in all 122 episodes of Homicide prior to joining the cast of SVU. He also appeared in Homicide: The Movie.)	Guest	Main		Guest			Main		
SVU	Donald Cragen	Dann Florek	Main	Main				Guest			
SVU	Monique Jeffries	Michelle Hurd		Main							
SVU	Odafin Tutuola	Ice-T	Guest	Main				Guest			Guest
SVU	Chester Lake	Adam Beach		Main							
SVU	Amanda Rollins	Kelli Giddish	Guest	Main				Guest		Guest	Guest
SVU	Nick Amaro	Danny Pino		Main							Guest
SVU	Katriona Tamin	Jamie Gray Hyder		Main							
SVU	Christian Garland	Demore Barnes		Main				Guest			
SVU	Joe Velasco	Octavio Pisano		Main				Guest			
SVU	Grace Muncy	Molly Burnett		Main				Guest			
SVU	Terry Bruno	Kevin Kane	Guest	Main							
SVU	Kate Silva	Juliana Aidén Martinez	Guest	Main							
SVU	Renee Curry	Aimé Donna Kelly		Main							
SVU	Jake Griffin	Corey Cott		Main							
Criminal Intent	Robert Goren	Vincent D'Onofrio			Main						
Criminal Intent	Alexandra Eames	Kathryn Erbe		Guest	Main						
Criminal Intent	James Deakins	Jamey Sheridan			Main						
Criminal Intent	Mike Logan	Chris Noth	Main		Main				Guest		
Criminal Intent	Carolyn Barek	Annabella Sciorra		Guest	Main						
Criminal Intent	Megan Wheeler	Julianne Nicholson			Main						
Criminal Intent	Danny Ross	Eric Bogosian			Main						
Criminal Intent	Nola Falacci	Alicia Witt			Main						
Criminal Intent	Zack Nichols	Jeff Goldblum			Main						
Criminal Intent	Serena Stevens	Saffron Burrows			Main						
Criminal Intent	Zoe Callas	Mary Elizabeth Mastrantonio			Main						
Criminal Intent	Joseph Hannah	Jay O. Sanders			Main						
Trial by Jury	Hector Salazar	Kirk Acevedo		Guest		Main					
Trial by Jury	Lennie Briscoe	Jerry Orbach	Main	Guest	Guest	Main			Guest		
Trial by Jury	Chris Ravell	Scott Cohen				Main					
LA	Rex Winters	Skeet Ulrich		Guest			Main				
LA	Tomas Jaruszalski	Corey Stoll					Main				
LA	Arleen Gonzalez	Rachel Ticotin					Main				
LA	Ricardo Morales	Alfred Molina					Main				
Organized Crime	Elliot Stabler	Christopher Meloni	Guest	Main		Guest		Main			
Organized Crime	Ayanna Bell	Danielle Moné Truitt		Guest				Main			
Organized Crime	Jet Slootmaekers	Ainsley Seiger	Guest	Guest				Main			
Organized Crime	Carmen Riley	Nona Parker-Johnson						Main			
Organized Crime	Jamie Whelan	Brent Antonello		Guest				Main			
Organized Crime	Bobby Reyes	Rick Gonzalez		Guest				Main			

=== Prosecutors ===
Series	Character	Portrayed by	Law & Order franchise						Universe		Chicago franchise		
Series	Character	Portrayed by	L&O	SVU	CI	TBJ	LA	OC	HLOTS	Con	P.D.	Med	Justice
Law & Order	Benjamin Stone	Michael Moriarty	Main										
Law & Order	Paul Robinette	Richard Brooks	Main (Note: Richard Brooks left Law & Order after the first three seasons and made guest appearances in "Custody", "Birthright" and "Fear America". In those episodes, Paul Robinette serves as a defense attorney.)										Guest
Law & Order	Adam Schiff	Steven Hill	Main	Guest									
Law & Order	Claire Kincaid	Jill Hennessy	Main						Guest				
Law & Order	Jack McCoy	Sam Waterston (Note: Additionally, the character of Jack McCoy appeared in the 1998 TV film Exiled: A Law & Order Movie.)	Main	Guest		Guest			Guest				
Law & Order	Jamie Ross	Carey Lowell	Main (Note: Carey Lowell starred in Law & Order in seasons seven to eight and made guest appearances in "Justice" and "School Daze". In those episodes, Jamie Ross serves as a defense attorney.)			Guest			Guest				
Law & Order	Abbie Carmichael	Angie Harmon	Main	Guest									
Law & Order	Serena Southerlyn	Elisabeth Röhm	Main										
Law & Order	Nora Lewin	Dianne Wiest	Main	Guest	Guest								
Law & Order	Arthur Branch	Fred Dalton Thompson (Note: Fred Dalton Thompson starred consecutively in both Law & Order and Law & Order: Trial by Jury.)	Main	Guest	Guest	Main				Guest			
Law & Order	Alexandra Borgia	Annie Parisse	Main										
Law & Order	Connie Rubirosa	Alana de la Garza (Note: Alana de la Garza joined the main cast of Law & Order: LA following the cancellation of Law & Order.)	Main	Guest			Main						
Law & Order	Michael Cutter	Linus Roache	Main	Guest									
Law & Order	Nolan Price	Hugh Dancy	Main										
Law & Order	Samantha Maroun	Odelya Halevi	Main										
Law & Order	Nicholas Baxter	Tony Goldwyn	Main										
SVU	Alexandra Cabot	Stephanie March (Note: During a four season absence from SVU, March headlined the short-lived Conviction as ADA Cabot.)		Main						Main			
SVU	Casey Novak	Diane Neal		Main		Guest							
SVU	Kim Greylek	Michaela McManus		Main									
SVU	Rafael Barba	Raúl Esparza		Main				Guest					
SVU	Peter Stone	Philip Winchester		Main							Guest	Guest	Main
SVU	Dominick Carisi Jr.	Peter Scanavino	Guest	Main				Guest			Guest		
Criminal Intent	Ron Carver	Courtney B. Vance			Main								
Trial by Jury	Tracey Kibre	Bebe Neuwirth		Guest		Main							
Trial by Jury	Kelly Gaffney	Amy Carlson				Main							
Trial by Jury	Arthur Branch	Fred Dalton Thompson	Main	Guest	Guest	Main				Guest			
LA	Connie Rubirosa	Alana de la Garza	Main	Guest			Main						
LA	Jonah Dekker	Terrence Howard		Guest			Main						
LA	Lauren Stanton	Megan Boone					Main						
LA	Evelyn Price	Regina Hall					Main						

=== Other characters ===
Series	Character	Portrayed by	Law & Order franchise					Universe	Chicago franchise
Series	Character	Portrayed by	L&O	SVU	CI	TBJ	OC	NYU	Fire
Law & Order	Elizabeth Rodgers	Leslie Hendrix (Note: Additionally, the character of Elizabeth Rogers appears in the 1998 TV film Exiled: A Law & Order Movie.)	Guest	Guest	Guest	Guest			
Law & Order	Elizabeth Olivet	Carolyn McCormick	Main	Guest	Guest	Guest		Guest	
SVU	Melinda Warner	Tamara Tunie		Main		Guest	Guest		Guest
SVU	George Huang	BD Wong		Main					
Criminal Intent	Paula Gyson	Julia Ormond			Main				
Organized Crime	Angela Wheatley	Tamara Taylor		Guest			Main		
Organized Crime	Richard Wheatley	Dylan McDermott		Guest			Main		

=== True Crime ===
Series	Character	Portrayed by	True Crime
Series	Character	Portrayed by	Menendez
The Menendez Murders	Leslie Abramson	Edie Falco	Main
The Menendez Murders	Erik Menendez	Gus Halper	Main
The Menendez Murders	Lyle Menendez	Miles Gaston Villanueva	Main

=== Episode count ===
Episode count current as of December 2024

List of Law & Order characters by number of appearances (50+ episodes)
Character (Note: The colors represent which series the character appeared in as a main cast member. In the case a character was a main cast member in two series, the color of the one in which they appeared most recently is shown.)	Primary series	Episodes	Law & Order franchise	Episodes	Law & Order universe	Episodes	Total appearances	First appearance	Last appearance
Olivia Benson (Mariska Hargitay)	SVU (1– )	550 (Note: Hargitay has appeared as Benson in all but nine episodes of SVU, missing one episode in Season 6, one in Season 7, five during Season 8, one in Season 10, and one in Season 12.)	• L&O • TBJ • OC	• 6 • 1 • 13	• Chicago P.D. • Chicago Fire	• 3 • 1	574	1999	present
Fin Tutuola (Ice-T)	SVU (2– )	499	• L&O • OC	• 1 • 2	Chicago P.D.	3	505	2000	present
Jack McCoy (Sam Waterston)	L&O (5–)	405 (Note: +1 TV movie)	• SVU • TBJ	• 4 • 2	Homicide	2	413	1994	present (Note: After the conclusion of Law & Order in 2010, Waterston made an appearance as McCoy on SVU in 2018. Waterson returned with the resumption of Law & Order in 2022.)
Anita Van Buren (S. Epatha Merkerson)	L&O (4–20)	388	• CI • TBJ	• 1 • 1	None	0	390	1993	2010
Donald Cragen (Dann Florek)	• L&O (1–3) • SVU (1–16, 23)	• 69 • 308	OC	4	None	0	383	1990	2024 (Note: Florek left the cast of Law & Order in 1993. He became an original cast member of SVU in 1999. Florek left the main cast of SVU in January 2014, but returned for guest appearances in May 2015 and October 2021. He made other guest appearances on Organized Crime in 2022 and 2024.)
John Munch (Richard Belzer)	SVU (1–15, 17)	242	• L&O • TBJ	• 4 • 1	• Homicide • The Wire • The Beat	• 119 • 1 • 1	368	1993 (Note: Belzer originated the Munch character on HLOTS in 1993, before becoming an original cast member of SVU in 1999.)	2016 (Note: Belzer left the main cast of SVU in 2014 after appearing sporadically during seasons 11–15. He returned for a guest appearance on SVU in May 2016.)
Elliot Stabler (Christopher Meloni)	• SVU (1–12) • OC (1– )	• 278 • 66	• L&O • TBJ	• 3 • 1	None	0	348	1999	present (Note: Meloni left the cast of SVU in 2011, but returned in a lead role on Organized Crime in April 2021.)
Lennie Briscoe (Jerry Orbach)	L&O (3–14)	273	• SVU • CI • TBJ	• 3 • 1 • 2	Homicide	3	282	1992	2004
Elizabeth Rodgers (Leslie Hendrix) (Note: Hendrix always appeared as Rodgers in a recurring role and not as a primary cast member.)	• L&O (2–20) • CI (1–10)	• 143 • 110	• SVU • TBJ	• 9 • 1	None	0	263	1992	2011
Amanda Rollins (Kelli Giddish)	SVU (13–24)	246	• OC • L&O	• 4 • 1	• Chicago P.D. • Chicago Fire	• 2 • 1	254	2011	2023
Adam Schiff (Steven Hill)	L&O (1–10)	228	SVU	1	None	0	229	1990	2000
Ed Green (Jesse L. Martin)	L&O (10–18)	198	• SVU • CI • TBJ	• 2 • 1 • 1	Andy Barker, P.I.	1	203	1999	2008
Dominick Carisi Jr. (Peter Scanavino)	SVU (16– )	198	• OC • L&O	• 3 • 1	Chicago P.D.	1	203	2016	present
Melinda Warner (Tamara Tunie)	SVU (2–17, 19, 21–)	173	TBJ; OC	1 1	Chicago Fire	1	177	2000	present
Mike Logan (Chris Noth)	• L&O (1–5) • CI (4–7)	• 111 • 36	None	0	Homicide	1	148	1990	2008
Alexandra Eames (Kathryn Erbe)	CI (1–10)	142	SVU	2	None	0	144	2001	2013
George Huang (BD Wong)	SVU (2–15, 17)	143	None	0	None	0	143	2001	2015
Arthur Branch (Fred Thompson)	• L&O (13–17) • TBJ	• 116 • 13	• SVU • CI	• 11 • 1	Conviction	1	142	2002	2007
Robert Goren (Vincent D'Onofrio)	CI (1–10)	133	None	0	None	0	141	2001	2011
James Deakins (Jamey Sheridan)	CI (1–5)	111	None	0	None	0	111	2001	2006
Ron Carver (Courtney B. Vance)	CI (1–5)	111	None	0	None	0	111	2001	2006
Alexandra Cabot (Stephanie March)	SVU (2–6, 10–11, 13, 19)	97	None	0	Conviction	13	110	2000	2018
Casey Novak (Diane Neal)	SVU (5–9, 12–13)	105	TBJ	1	None	0	106	2003	2012
Rey Curtis (Benjamin Bratt)	L&O (6–9, 20)	95	None	0	Homicide	3	98	1995	2009 (Note: After departing Law & Order in 1999, Bratt returned for a guest appearance during the twentieth season in 2009.)
Connie Rubirosa (Alana de la Garza)	L&O (17–20)	85	• LA • SVU	• 8 • 1	None	0	94	2006	2014
Nick Amaro (Danny Pino)	SVU (13–16, 23)	91	None	0	Chicago P.D.	2	93	2011	2021
Rafael Barba (Raúl Esparza)	SVU (14–19, 21–23)	88	OC	1	None	0	89	2012	2022
Benjamin Stone (Michael Moriarty)	L&O (1–4)	88	None	0	None	0	88	1990	1994
Serena Southerlyn (Elisabeth Röhm)	L&O (12–15)	85	None	0	None	0	85	2001	2005
Abbie Carmichael (Angie Harmon)	L&O (9–11)	72	SVU	6	None	0	78	1998	2001
Elizabeth Olivet (Carolyn McCormick)	L&O (2–7, 9–10, 13–20)	67	• SVU • CI • TBJ	• 6 • 1 • 1	NY Undercover	1	76	1991	2018
Paul Robinette (Richard Brooks)	L&O (1–3, 6, 16–17)	69	None	0	Chicago Justice	1	70	1990	2017 (Note: After departing Law & Order in 1993, Brooks returned for guest appearances in seasons 6, 16, and 17, along with an appearance on Chicago Justice in 2017.)
Claire Kincaid (Jill Hennessy) (Note: Hennessy's twin sister Jacqueline played Kincaid in one episode in season 6, due to a scheduling conflict.)	L&O (4–6)	69	None	0	Homicide	1	70	1993	1996
Michael Cutter (Linus Roache)	L&O (18–20)	63	SVU	4	None	0	67	2008	2012
Noah Porter-Benson (various) (Note: Porter-Benson always appeared in a recurring role and not as a primary character.)	SVU (15– )	65	OC	2	None	0	67	2014	present
Cyrus Lupo (Jeremy Sisto)	L&O (18–20)	63	None	0	None	0	63	2008	2010
Danny Ross (Eric Bogosian)	CI (6–9)	61	None	0	None	0	61	2006	2010
Kevin Bernard (Anthony Anderson)	L&O (18–21)	60	None	0	None	0	60	2008	2022 (Note: Anderson returned to Law & Order with the resumption of the series in 2022, following a 12-year hiatus.)
Ayanna Bell (Danielle Moné Truitt)	OC (1– )	52	SVU	4	None	0	56	2021	present
Jet Slootmaekers (Ainsley Seiger)	OC (1– )	52	• SVU • L&O	• 3 • 1	None	0	56	2021	present
Tony Profaci (John Fiore) (Note: Fiore always appeared as Profaci in a recurring role and not as a primary cast member.)	L&O (1–9)	53	None	0	None	0	53	1990	1998
Jamie Ross (Carey Lowell)	L&O (7–8, 10–11, 21)	50	TBJ	2	Homicide	1	53	1996	2022 (Note: Lowell returned to Law & Order for one episode after the resumption of the series in 2022, following a 17-year hiatus.)
Ryan O'Halloran (Mike Doyle) (Note: Doyle always appeared as O'Halloran in a recurring role and not as a primary cast member.)	SVU (5–10)	53	None	0	None	0	53	2003	2009
Ronnie Brooks (Bradley Walsh)	UK (1–5)	53	None	0	None	0	53	2009	2014
Emil Skoda (J. K. Simmons)	L&O (8–15, 20)	44	• SVU • CI	• 6 • 1	NY Undercover	1	52	1997	2010
Ruben Morales (Joel de la Fuente) (Note: de la Fuente always appeared as Morales in a recurring role and not as a primary cast member.)	SVU (3–12)	52	None	0	None	0	52	2002	2011
