= Wonder drug =

Wonder drug could refer to:

- Aspirin, or other medications
- "Wonder Drug" (song), a 2018 song by Allday
- Wonder Drug (book), a 2023 nonfiction book by Jennifer Vanderbes
- Wonder Drugs (Night Court), an episode of an American sitcom
- "Wonder Drug", a 1962 song by Carl Butler

== See also ==
- Miracle Drug (disambiguation)
