= Law & Order: Legacies =

Episodic graphic adventure video game

- Developer(s): Telltale Games
- Publisher(s): Telltale Games
- Producer(s): Dave Felton; Jason Lars Berquist
- Designer(s): Ryan Kaufman; Andy Hartzell; Ed Kuehnel
- Programmer(s): Clarence Lum; Keenan Patterson
- Artist(s): Mai Nguyen
- Writer(s): Ryan Kaufman; Arie Kaplan; Andy Hartzell; Ed Kuehnel
- Composer(s): Jared Emerson-Johnson; Mike Post (Original Themes)
- Series: Law & Order
- Engine: Telltale Tool
- Platform(s): iOS, Microsoft Windows, OS X
- Release: See below
- Genre(s): Graphic adventure
- Mode(s): Single-player

Law & Order: Legacies is an episodic graphic adventure video game based on the Law & Order franchise. It was developed by Telltale Games and was originally announced as Law & Order: Los Angeles, but it was changed to include fan favorite characters from the entire run of the Law & Order franchise. Among them are Rey Curtis, Lennie Briscoe, Anita Van Buren, Abbie Carmichael, Jack McCoy, Mike Logan, Michael Cutter, and Adam Schiff from Law & Order, and Olivia Benson from Law & Order: Special Victims Unit.

It was released in seven episodes, with the first two episodes released simultaneously on iOS on December 22, 2011. The remaining five episodes, as well as versions for Windows and Mac OS X, were released in the spring of 2012. Like the previous three Law & Order games, this is a graphic adventure game that mirrors the TV series in having both police procedural and courtroom portions to the game play. The game was withdrawn from sale on digital platforms after Telltale Games chose not to renew their digital distribution agreement with license holders.

== Episodes ==
Law & Order: Legacies is composed of seven episodes, released over the course of four months.

Chapter	Written by	Episode Release date
Episode 1: Revenge	Ryan Kaufman	December 22, 2011 (iOS); January 24, 2012 (Windows/OS X)
Notes: Detective Rey Curtis investigates a murder of a maid in a 5-star hotel with the help of Olivia Benson from the Special Victims Unit.
Episode 2: Home to Roost	Arie Kaplan & Andy Hartzell	December 22, 2011 (iOS); January 24, 2012 (Windows/OS X)
Notes: In 1999, Rey Curtis and Lennie Briscoe investigate when a body is discovered with a gash on the thigh.
Episode 3: Killer Smart	Ed Kuehnel & Ryan Kaufman	January 6, 2012 (iOS); January 24, 2012 (Windows/OS X)
Notes: Detective Mike Logan consults with the 27th precinct when he investigates a string of dumped bodies in Long Island.
Episode 4: Nobody's Child	Andy Hartzell	January 20, 2012 (iOS); February 18, 2012 (Windows/OS X)
Notes: On New Year's Eve 1999, the battered body of a young boy is found in an alley.
Episode 5: Ear Witness	Ed Kuehnel & Ryan Kaufman	February 9, 2012 (iOS); February 18, 2012 (Windows/OS X)
Notes: A woman is murdered and the only witness is her blind son who can identify the suspect by the sound of their voice.
Episode 6: Side Effects	Andy Hartzell	February 25, 2012 (iOS); March 29, 2012 (Windows/OS X)
Notes: A murder investigation at a prep school uncovers a dark secret being kept by parents and faculty members.
Episode 7: Resolution	Ryan Kaufman	March 26, 2012 (iOS); March 29, 2012 (Windows/OS X)
Notes: The element that ties the cases together is revealed, and the culprit is uncovered.

== Reception ==
Reception

Aggregate score
Aggregator	Score
Metacritic	53/100

Review scores
Publication	Score
GameSpot	5/10
PALGN	4.5/10

Law & Order: Legacies received mixed to negative reviews from critics upon release. On Metacritic, the game holds a score of 53/100 for the PC version based on 10 reviews, indicating "mixed or average reviews".
