= Law & Order: Criminal Intent (video game) =

2005 video game

- Developer: Legacy Interactive
- Platform: Microsoft Windows
- Release: NA: November 15, 2005; EU: March 24, 2006
- Genre: Adventure
- Modes: Single-player, multiplayer

Law & Order: Criminal Intent is a video game adaptation of the television series Law & Order: Criminal Intent. It is the fourth title in a series of video games based on the Law & Order franchise.

== Plot ==
The player takes on the role of Detective Robert Goren, voiced by actor Vincent D'Onofrio, and attempts to solve four homicide investigations. As Detective Goren, the player will scrutinize crime scenes, analyze evidence and interview witnesses and suspects. The player will utilize Goren's instincts for interrogation by selecting his psychological approach to each witness and potential suspect. The player will decide if Goren should try to deceive the suspect, intimidate him into talking, or take another approach altogether. Captain Deakins, voiced by Jamey Sheridan, provides his streetwise perspective and savvy guidance throughout the course of the investigations. In order to solve each case, the player builds a profile based on real-life criminal profiling techniques to help track down the killers. Detective Hadrian, played by Nick Basta, is a character created specifically for the game, and was not featured in the main show.

== Reception ==
Reception

Aggregate scores
Aggregator	Score
GameRankings	58.33%
Metacritic	56/100

Review scores
Publication	Score
Adventure Gamers	2.5/5
GameSpot	5/10
GameSpy	3/5
GameZone	8/10
IGN	6/10
PC Gamer (UK)	28%
PC Gamer (US)	77%
The Sydney Morning Herald	2.5/5

Criminal Intent was met with mixed reception, as GameRankings gave it a score of 58.33%, while Metacritic gave it 56 out of 100.
