= Law & Order season 24 =

Season of American television series

Law & Order
- Season 24
- Promotional poster
- Starring: Reid Scott; Mehcad Brooks; Maura Tierney; Hugh Dancy; Odelya Halevi; Tony Goldwyn
- No. of episodes: 22

Release
- Original network: NBC
- Original release: October 3, 2024 – May 15, 2025

Season chronology
- ← Previous; Season 23 Next → Season 25

The twenty-fourth season of Law & Order, an American police procedural and legal drama, premiered on NBC on October 3, 2024. The season consisted of 22 episodes.

== Cast and characters ==
=== Main ===
- Reid Scott as Junior Detective Vincent Riley
- Mehcad Brooks as Senior Detective Jalen Shaw
- Maura Tierney as Lieutenant Jessica Brady
- Hugh Dancy as Executive Assistant District Attorney Nolan Price
- Odelya Halevi as Assistant District Attorney Samantha Maroun
- Tony Goldwyn as District Attorney Nicholas Baxter

=== Crossover stars from Law & Order: Special Victims Unit ===
- Mariska Hargitay as Captain Olivia Benson
- Peter Scanavino as Assistant District Attorney Dominick Carisi Jr.
- Elizabeth Marvel as Defense Attorney Rita Calhoun
- Kevin Kane as Junior Detective Terry Bruno
- Juliana Aidén Martinez as Junior Detective Kate Silva

=== Recurring ===
- Connie Shi as Junior Detective Violet Yee
- Barry Kolman as William Price

=== Guest ===
- Liam Aiken as Thomas Norton
- Bruce Altman as Mayor Robert Payne
- Alimi Ballard as Defense Attorney Ron Delahunt
- Chris Bauer as Jack Costa
- Michael Beach as Defense Attorney Brian Harris
- Marsha Stephanie Blake as Defense Attorney Erica Knight
- Cara Buono as Lisa Dumont
- Victoria Cartagena as Defense Attorney Yolanda Matos
- Justin Chatwin as Thomas Price
- J. Anthony Crane as Ron Lawson
- Jack Cutmore-Scott as Sean Harper
- Eisa Davis as Defense Attorney Virginia Hogan
- Angel Desai as Judge Roberta Hines
- Mike Doyle as Terry Clausen
- Rockmond Dunbar as Principal Sykes
- Daryl Edwards as Trial Judge Paul Gifford
- Ryan Eggold as Matt Riley
- Michael Esper as Kenneth Lane
- Maury Ginsberg as Defense Attorney Scott Quinn
- Michael Gladis as Christopher Heartwood
- Karron Graves as Defense Attorney Diana Rogers
- Arica Himmel as Angela Ross
- Lisa Howard as Meredith West
- Brian Hutchison as Chief FBI Agent Sean Merrill
- Željko Ivanek as Defense Attorney Charles Banks
- Juliette Jeffers as Cassandra Matthis
- C. David Johnson as Trial Judge Harold Leone
- Stephen Kunken as Sam Bennett
- Fredric Lehne as Captain Greg Stockwell
- Katie Lowes as Victoria Beyer
- Emily Meade as Laura Kingsbury
- Kevyn Morrow as Judge Marty Chen
- Karen Obilom as Detective Vanessa Washburn
- Okieriete Onaodowan as Mike Keyz
- Mekhi Phifer as Lyman Ross
- Katee Sackhoff as Defense Attorney Vanessa Gallo
- Sherri Saum as Andrea Morgan
- Raphael Sbarge as Defense Attorney Brian Lee
- Jeremy Shamos as Carlton Kelly
- Haaz Sleiman as FBI Agent Joshua Omar Haddad
- Markuann Smith as Lawrence French
- Abigail Spencer as Michelle Burns
- Erica Sweany as Sarah Heartwood
- Mike Vogel as Detective Miles Brandt
- Amanda Warren as Defense Attorney Camilla Paymor
- Michaela Watkins as Judge Madeline Bennett
- Jessica White as Hailey Vonn
- Brian Yang as Sgt. Freddy Chen
- Selenis Leyva as Defense Attorney Patricia Kaplan
- Bart Shatto as Dr. Simon Neagle
- Nat Cassidy as Noah Winters
- Demetrius Grosse as Darryl Moore
- Samantha Soule as Ashley Davenport
- Maggie Siff as Defense Attorney Kate Norris
- Gary Perez as Trial Judge Sydney Bolden
- Jesse Metcalfe as Sergeant Danny DeLuca
- Laila Robins as Defense Attorney Megan Stratton
- Juliana Dever as Joy Andrews
- Benito Martinez as Trial Judge William Moscatello
- Henry Stram as Jordan Weiss
- Anzu Lawson as Dr. Nancy Willis
- Natalie Gold as Megan Wallace
- Michael Potts as Defense Attorney Kenneth Lowell
- Charlie Semine as Bruce Theobald
- Tara Macken as Woman Held Hostage by Travis Mitchell
- David Castro as Ernesto Ruiz
- Wai Ching Ho as Li Tan
- Jessica Leccia as Odette Ruiz
- Melanie Nicholls-King as Unnamed Abernathy Middle School Principal
- Stephen A. Smith as Ted Hunter
- Ruben Santiago-Hudson as Defense Attorney Winters
- Anna Wood as Defense Attorney Nicole Potter

== Episodes ==
| No. overall | No. in season | Title | Directed by | Written by | Original release date | Prod. code | U.S viewers (millions) |
|---|---|---|---|---|---|---|---|
| 502 | 1 | "Catch and Kill" | Eriq La Salle | Rick Eid & Art Alamo | October 3, 2024 | 2401 | 3.64 |
Brooklyn prosecutor Macy Harper is found brutally beaten to death in the home of clothier Dylan Phipps to whom she was engaged. Shaw and Riley track her whereabouts prior to the murder and discover she had been staying at a shelter for battered women, making Phipps the prime suspect. Phipps, however, has a seemingly solid alibi from his friend and right-wing news site owner Kenneth Lane. Surprising video evidence soon emerges, prompting Maroun and Price to go after Lane as an accessory. When an eyewitness "lawyers up" Maroun takes drastic action, and Price tries to keep her from destroying herself and her career. With a new lieutenant, Jessica Brady, in charge of the 2-7, Det. Riley struggles to adapt to her command style. Note: The episode is followed by a public service announcement that reads: If you or someone you know is in need of help, please call the National Domestic Violence Hotline at 1-800-799-SAFE (7233). Support is free, confidential, and available 24/7. Cast: First appearance of Maura Tierney as Lieutenant Jessica Brady.
| 503 | 2 | "The Perfect Man" | David Grossman | Scott Gold | October 10, 2024 | 2402 | 3.45 |
Tyler Miller, the founder an AI-infused dating app called E.L.I. (Enigmatic Love Interface), is shot dead in Central Park. Shaw and Riley try to understand who and why would anyone kill a "hopeless romantic" like Miller. When evidence provides DNA, but it is not found in CODIS, Lt. Brady tells Det. Riley to run it through the local database, which Lt. Dixon said to avoid. The suspect is found and arrested, but Capt. Olivia Benson from the Special Victims Unit visits the 2-7 and protests that the suspect is a rape victim, not a killer. ADAs Price and Maroun are surprised when Rita Calhoun calls Benson as an expert witness for the defense, raising an ethical debate over using the local DNA database to prosecute victims as perpetrators. Benson calls for Judge Roberta Hines' opinion, and Price tries to mediate between Benson and Brady. The trial sparks a New York Journal article, "Can Crime Victim's DNA Be Used Against Them?"
| 504 | 3 | "Big Brother" | Alex Hall | Rick Eid | October 17, 2024 | 2403 | 3.09 |
College basketball coach Nick Walsh is robbed and murdered. Shaw and Riley track down and eliminate suspect after suspect while the motive remains elusive. Det. Ray Wallace calls Riley about his brother Matt, who is jammed up on a gun dealing charge. Matt agrees to become a CI, but reneges on his deal to testify. Price is forced to impeach his own witness on the stand to reveal the defendant's hidden motive.
| 505 | 4 | "The Meaning of Life" | Leslie Hope | Jennifer Vanderbes | October 24, 2024 | 2404 | 3.33 |
When a pipe bomb goes off in a brownstone, Shaw and Riley must determine which of its inhabitants was the target; the author of Playing God, Christopher Heartwood, or fertility doctor Sarah Heartwood. Price and Maroun pursue a charge of first degree murder against the suspect, despite the fact that Sarah is still on life support, albeit brain-dead. Defense attorney Brian Lee calls Dr. Matthew Calhoun to testify as an expert witness on Lazarus syndrome to infer that no murder has occurred. Just before closing arguments, Maroun discovers that Sarah has a DNR clause in her will.
| 506 | 5 | "Report Card" | Néstor Carbonell | Pamela Wechsler & Ajani Jackson | October 31, 2024 | 2405 | 3.62 |
Thirteen year-old foster child, Anthony "Ant" Turner, is accused of killing his middle school teacher, Walter Rhodes. Baxter wants to try him as an adult to send a strong message about the penalty for killing public servants. But Price and Maroun want to plea bargain Ant's sentence down in exchange for his testimony against Principal Sykes for not following prevention policies. They propose that his reckless inaction amounts to manslaughter, in that he failed to perform a proper search, did not warn the teacher who was threatened, and did not contact the police. Shaw's attempts to help Ant are undermined by Ant's own culpability.
| 507 | 6 | "Time Will Tell" | Milena Govich | Rick Eid & Scott Gold | November 7, 2024 | 2406 | 3.49 |
Dean Meredith West of the prestigious Ellsworth Academy prep school is beaten to death. Shaw and Riley discover a toxic system of pressure on parents and students alike to succeed, given the cost of rigging the system to receive "extra time" accommodations. An anxious student confesses, then her mother confesses to protect her daughter. Detectives and prosecutors must determine who to convict. D.A. Baxter is a school board member, presenting a conflict of interest.
| 508 | 7 | "Truth and Consequences" | Fred Berner | Pamela Wechsler | November 14, 2024 | 2407 | 3.35 |
Journalism professor Charles Bennett is beaten to death in his home. His wife, Judge Madeline Bennett is called to testify, but refuses to take the stand to hide her own secret that threatens not only her job, but her past rulings as well. The Mayor intercedes, and Baxter instructs Price to offer the killer a plea bargain to protect her reputation. Maroun is likewise challenged with protecting another witness from being deported. Thomas Norton, fired by the judge for his pro-Palestinian political beliefs, takes a lesser sentence after he allocutes to the crime.
| 509 | 8 | "Bad Apple" | Michael Smith | Art Alamo | November 21, 2024 | 2408 | 3.76 |
Sergeant Jordan Harrison, an officer from the 2-9 Major Case Narcotics squad, is shot in the back after a fentanyl bust worth more than a half a million dollars. Brady returns to her old precinct to investigate along with Shaw and Riley. The slug matches the gun of Eddie White, who got away during the raid, but White claims a cop took the gun with a bag of drugs and money. Harrison's body cam confirms the story, and Brady investigates who in the squad might be dirty. The suspect is found and Baxter wants to charge murder one to send a message, but Price and Maroun hit the "blue wall" trying to find any fellow officers who will testify.
| 510 | 9 | "Enemy of the State" | Alex Hall | Scott Gold & Ajani Jackson | January 16, 2025 | 2409 | 4.16 |
Raymond James Clark is pushed in front of a subway train. Shaw and Riley look for a motive, with only video of a unique bracelet as evidence. Noah Turan, an American-born son of an Uyghur Muslim restaurant owner, is found with what looks like a C-4 bomb. The whole squad mobilizes for a terror attack, presumably by Daesh. The suspect is detained and he proffers his jihadist handler, Karim. At trial Price must convince Baxter to testify to the uses and abuses of the 2006 JTTF legislation that Baxter crafted; "Operation Lure and Trap."
| 511 | 10 | "Greater Good" | Eriq La Salle | Teleplay by : Rick Eid & Ajani Jackson; Story by : Rick Eid | January 23, 2025 | 2410 | 4.33 |
A respected music mogul Wes Morgan is found shot to death. Shaw and Riley find video and question a woman seen with Wes outside a club, who reveals that she is Detective Vanessa Washburn with the Security Services Unit, and that Wes is under investigation for sex trafficking. A suspect is found who was trying to protect his daughter. Price and Baxter disagree on how the reputations of the accused versus the victim might influence the jury's verdict. Washburn is pressured to testify, and Shaw must impeach her on the stand.
| 512 | 11 | "The Hardest Thing" | Michael Pressman | Art Alamo | January 30, 2025 | 2411 | 4.12 |
Charles Harper, wealthy creator of the Inherit-Ed DNA site, is executed in his home. Brady, Shaw and Riley begin investigating the obvious motive, greed, suspecting first his son, then his daughter. What began as murder for money turns into the possibility of assisted suicide to preempt death by Pick's disease. Price and his brother Thomas have their own debate about their father's failing health.
| 513 | 12 | "Duty to Protect" | David Grossman | Pamela Wechsler | February 13, 2025 | 2412 | 4.19 |
A teenage girl, Kaitlyn Lawson, is found bludgeoned and strangled to death, and before identification, motive remains elusive. Her computer search history leads Shaw and Reilly back to her step-father Ronald Lawson. Her movie star mother Michelle Burns provides Ron an alibi, but DNA puts him at the scene. At his trial, a video by Kaitlyn reveals a motive; Ron had sexually abused her since she was fourteen. Ronald takes the bailiff's gun and shoots himself. Baxter and Price wonder if and why Michelle failed to protect Kaitlyn. Brady re-interviews her to determine what she knew and when, and then arrests her. A new trial begins with Michelle as the defendant. Defense attorney Virginia Hogan wants to present testimony from psychologist Dr. Lisa Mankin that Michelle was incapable of ending the abuse as she herself had been sexually abused since she was nine, and has developed dissociative disorder as a result. Because of the manner of the death of Maroun's sister, she sympathizes with Burns, and thinks the testimony should be allowed. The judge sides with Price, so Maroun argues with Price to make a plea bargain. Notes: Inspired by the posthumous allegations against Alice Munro. The episode is followed by a public service announcement that reads: If you or someone you know is the victim of sexual assault call 1-800-656-HOPE (4673). It's free, confidential, and available 24/7.
| 514 | 13 | "In God We Trust" | John Behring | Jennifer Vanderbes | February 20, 2025 | 2413 | 4.09 |
Eli Freeman, a young lawyer who is against the Ten Commandments in charter schools, is found bludgeoned to death. Detectives discover his secret background, growing up as Elijah Penner in the Baylor Church community near Hudson, New York. They question his parents and Martha Fairchild who volunteers at Pathway Forward rehabilitating ex-convicts. A suspect is detained, but Price has difficulty eliciting testimony on the stand, due to their ultra-conservative, Luddite, isolationist doctrine. Attorney Suzanne Forrester, from the Alternative Justice organization, and D.A. Baxter debate prison versus community service as the appropriate punishment for a reduced plea of criminally negligent homicide. Baxter urges Price and Maroun for a murder conviction, so they look for more evidence to show motive.
| 515 | 14 | "A Price to Pay" | Laura Belsey | Scott Gold & William Lapp | February 27, 2025 | 2414 | 4.03 |
A-list actor Johnny Colvin is murdered, and discovered by assistant Casey Booth, who says director Noah Winters was maniacal at their last shoot. Video reveals "superfan-supercreep" stalker Brittany Weaver, who alibis. She mentions Johnny's ex, Adalina Grad, threatened to kill him. Adalina claims Johnny was a ketamine addict, as is boy band member Stuey McIntyre, who says Casey was there that night. Catching Casey fleeing, she admits delivering ketamine, but that night he scored from his source, SoHo psychiatrist Dr. Simon Neagle. Performing a sting, they arrest him. For immunity, he names his distributor, Diane Oliver (aka Mother K). Arrested for murder, she layers up, and their case is very thin. Jalen confronts Marine buddy Darryl "D-Money" Moore about using "K" for wartime PTSD. When Neagle overdoses, Maroun and Baxter ask Judge Angela Dillow for a continuance. Defense attorney Linda Campisi argues it infringes on Oliver's sixth amendment rights. Yee finds video of Diane's visitor. Shaw recognizes Moore, who admits he scored, and she had blood on her shoes. Risking dishonorable discharged for drugs, Moore refuses to testify. Price demands a subpoena, but Moore transfers to Okinawa. Out of time, Baxter is forced to offer a plea of Manslaughter 2. Note: Inspired by the accidental overdose death of Matthew Perry.
| 516 | 15 | "Crossing Lines" | Fred Berner | Pamela Wechsler & Marley Schneier | March 13, 2025 | 2415 | 3.53 |
Officer Greta Lindstrom reports James Powers was killed with a rock. Doug Keller witnessed Powers telling a woman, "if you ruin me, I'll ruin you." James's father, Senator George Powers, says James's lover was exotic dancer Rose Gregory. Frances says Rose attacked her son. Rose flees Riley and Yee, hitting a bicyclist with her car, but her alibi holds. Pressuring Fisk Club manager Alan Baker, Brady learns James met with fixer Ashley Davenport to kill reporter Julia Gallo's defaming "hit piece". Finding blood, they arrest Gallo, who calls defense attorney Kate Norris, so Baxter recuses himself. Price rejects Norris's "man two" plea concerning Gallo's "femme fatale" notoriety. Gallo's claims self defense after attempted rape. Davenport describes smear campaign tactics. Nolan tells Nicholas, "Kate threatened our witness", leveraging Keller's OnlyFans page, and his daughter's opioids addiction, which is inadmissible and violates conduct code. Keller can confirm the argument and disprove rape, but having recanted on record, "to the jury...his credibility is shot". Nicholas confronts Kate with sanctioning and disbarment. Relaying Norris's conduct, Judge Sydney Bolden grants Price a hearsay exception; Shaw relays Keller's statement. Price proves Gallo previously lied under oath regarding her divorce and extra-marital affairs. Bolden overrules Norris's objection. Note: Inspired by the inappropriate relationship scandal involving Robert F. Kennedy Jr. and Olivia Nuzzi.
| 517 | 16 | "Folk Hero" | Carlos Bernard | Rick Eid & Scott Gold | March 20, 2025 | 2416 | 3.82 |
A gunman murders health insurance CEO Logan Andrews. From a tourist's description, Yee and Detective Edgar Martinez mobilize forces, including drones. Riley and Sergeant Danny DeLuca chase, finding his "people over profits" note. Molly Doyle says "he's a hero...OptiShield is the devil" who bankrupted her sick uncle. Yee observes others matching the description; bragging "it worked", Riley books three faux gunmen for obstruction of governmental administration. Logan's wife Joy says COO Jerry Waldman had motive; he and Katherine alibi. Spotting a gun, they prevent EverVita CEO Steven Jeffries's murder, arresting Ethan Weller. Arraignment Judge Heather Campbell remands Weller while spectators boo. Attorney Megan Stratton's asserts, Weller killed with "legal reason" to save thousands more from "Andrews' callous disregard for human life." Price argues it perverts the defense of others doctrine. Progressive socialist-leaning Judge William Moscatello retorts, "it's up to the jury." Author Jordan Weiss estimates 46,456 deaths from OptiShield's "delay, deny, defend" model. Weller testifies he petitioned Andrews to cure his mother's terminal breast cancer, but they refused to pay for treatment. Continually overruling reasonable objections, Price suggests motioning to remove Moscatello. Baxter warns, "He'll never concede he's biased." The jury foreperson reads the verdict, "We find the defendant..." Note: Inspired by the killing of UnitedHealthcare CEO Brian Thompson.
| 518 | 17 | "A Perfect Family" | Michael Smith | Rick Eid & Jennifer Vanderbes | April 3, 2025 | 2417 | 3.66 |
Twelve year-old Emily Chapman dies, falling from the High Line. An officer reports the 911 caller Mohammed Abdi heard an altercation. At Hawkins private school, Patricia Kern names "mean girl" Gabby Feliciano, who claims volleyball Coach Mark Redmond gave Emily "private practice sessions". Redmond mentions trouble at home. Emily's mother Melinda calls Redmond a creep with "dark intentions". Dashcam footage shows Melinda pushing Emily. Attorney Walter Jeffries plans an insanity defense. Dr. Nancy Willis hears, "I had to protect my baby....from Emily." Dr. Catherine Burns calls Melinda's belief that Emily was a demon, "full-on postpartum psychosis", blaming her intense, controlling, Navy SEAL husband Derek as responsible, having actively prevented medication. Baxter suggests negligent homicide; Price goes for manslaughter two, a dangerous precedent. Defense attorney Megan Wallace shows, Derek never physically prevented medication. He testifies, Melinda was a "selfish evil" person, jealous of Emily, wanting more attention on herself. With he-said she-said, needing another opinion, Price asks ten year-old Amanda, who, expressing suicidal thoughts, confirms Melinda's behavior. Grandmother Jane Dyer objects to Amanda testifying. Ultimately, Price cannot continue, telling Judge Kenneth Maldonado he has no questions for Amanda. The jury foreperson announces not guilty. Meanwhile, Vincent reassures his daughter Bridget.
| 519 | 18 | "Inherent Bias" | Néstor Carbonell | Art Alamo & Jolie Huang | April 10, 2025 | 2418 | 3.66 |
After a press conference, white WNBA star Cameron Adler is murdered. Officer Lee reports a hooded, masked shooter. Jim Hennessy provides video. Three suspects alibi; black rival Nia Moore, black girlfriend Rachelle Jones, and white ex-boyfriend, sports reporter Greg Dawson, who provides another lead. At Highest Score growhouse, white business manager Bruce Theobald admits attending her game, but took a train when Cameron was shot. He suggests black physical therapist Darius Cain, who has a violent record. Cain runs, tossing something into the East River; Riley saw a gun; Shaw cannot confirm, and it is too cold for divers. Attorney Kenneth Lowell calls Cain "the victim of a racially biased system." Judge Carter Nevins remands Cain. Lowell's defense strategy: accuses Theobald, claiming Cameron intended to fire him; undermines facial recognition technology's "inherent racial bias"; disputes when Cameron's blood got onto Cain's jeans; and questions Riley's unreliable eyewitness testimony. Cain testifies he threw a "hard drive. Not a gun." Shaw thinks "he's telling the truth." Shaw tells Riley, "Everybody has inherent biases." Notifying the defense, Maroun and Price are also at odds. Before Judge Amelia Mounier, Price shows that Shaw hoped Cain was innocent. Rielly concludes, "Inherent bias works both ways...it's up to the jury." Shaw retorts, "that's the problem."
| 520 | 19 | "Play with Fire Part 1" | Jean de Segonzac | Rick Eid & Art Alamo | April 17, 2025 | 2419 | 3.97 |
ICE raids Father Alberto's shelter. Fleeing, Sophia investigates where Ana Machado was raped. Ana calls the phone number Sophia provided. Benson responds with Silva and Riley, finding a burning corpse. Brady revisits the similar unsolved case of Gloria Ortega's daughter Rosa. Cousin Edgar leads them to Carlos, whom Riley collars for drugs; video alibis him for murder. Yee finds video of Sophia's belt buckle before her murder. Brady recalls Rosa's shelter; Alberto says Sofia worked at a restaurant where Jose says she argued with someone. They identify Lieutenant Paul Gomez, who says Detective Maria Recinos was "Sofia" undercover. Benson had mentored Recinos after a pedophile's attack. Silva and Carisi discover a WhatsApp VoIP number. Baxter suggests calling the trafficker. Bruno follows directions, finding "a sex prison hiding in plain sight." The girl in the bedroom demands bitcoin; police raid, arresting women and johns. Surmising somebody surveils, Benson and Brady raid next door, freeing women held by Travis Mitchell, arresting him. Attorney Brett Cole alibis Mitchell for murder. Silva traces Ana's burner through Christine Sung's bodega. After telling Benson about Sophia, Ana bolts. An MLI determines Ana was strangled; having seminal fluid from Miguel Pinto, who alibis, Baxter concludes Pinto was framed. Note: This episode begins a crossover event that concludes on Law & Order: Special Victims Unit season 26 episode 19 "Play with Fire Part 2".
| 521 | 20 | "Sins of the Father" | Sharon Lewis | Scott Gold & Ajani Jackson | May 1, 2025 | 2420 | 3.55 |
After Mr. Tatum complains to Leo Brooks, auto-mechanic Sunny Zhen is shot. Li Tan says, "Sunny was a chemist", fired as a suspected Chinese spy; Professor Tao Chen calls the anonymous tip bogus. Grad student Eli Randall tried apologizing; a gunman scared him away. In teacher Ernesto Ruiz's BMW, they find Sunny's blood and cousin Omar Nuñez's DNA. Baxter wants to leverage Ernesto to prosecute his drug dealing father, Antonio, after 5,000 fentanyl deaths last year. Maroun takes exception because her father's sportsbook paid for law school. Defense Attorney Walter Singer informs Price, Nuñez is dead. The Warden indicates Nuñez never knew the killer, whose daughter Melanie South visited. Facing accessory to murder, Melanie names Alfred Arroyo who paid her. Confronted by machine pistol fire, Riley and Shaw are forced to kill Arroyo, confiscating twelve pounds. Through OnStar they find their drug lab in a Vexcore container and pull thirteen bodies from the river, used as guinea pigs for an experimental fentanyl. Baxter reasons, phone transcripts make Ernesto guilty of murder via predicate crime. Again, Maroun takes exception, "punishing Ernesto for his father's sins?" Baxter concludes, "we don't have a choice." Ernesto incriminates Antonio via bodycam.
| 522 | 21 | "Tough Love" | Martha Mitchell | Teleplay by : Pamela Wechsler & Scott Gold; Story by : Pamela Wechsler & William Lapp | May 8, 2025 | 2421 | 3.45 |
Ted Hunter warns basketball star Jackson Dean his $8-million is gone, and to fire his indolent hanger-on entourage. MLI Burns reports, Hunter died from knife wounds. The knife is found with Ted's blood; ARGUS captures his murder. Seventeen year-old son Josh mentions Ted fought with someone. Vortex 21 nightclub manager provides the name; they chase and arrest Tommy Caro for criminal possession of a firearm, but he alibis. Questioning chauffeur Ethan Matthews, they retrieve text messages from Josh's coach Brian Boggs, who explains Josh's knee is fine, "he just doesn't want to play football." Finding his online knife purchase, they arrest Josh. Judge Nancy Freeman grants Defense Attorney Winters' motion to suppress Josh's earlier statements. Price and Maroun get "encrypted messages" from Josh's therapist, an "AI-generated chatbot", which Baxter calls "terrifying", revealing "a disciplinarian father...an extreme exercise and nutritional regimen" that turned Eric into an NFL prospect and Josh into a murderer. Winters tries a self-defense strategy showing the AI's response to Josh. In Judge Freeman's chambers they argue applicability, and she allows it. Sonya Morley testifies regarding Josh's fear for his life. Price calls Eric as a hostile rebuttal witness, asking about tough love, and proves that Josh lied.
| 523 | 22 | "Look the Other Way" | Alex Hall | Rick Eid | May 15, 2025 | 2422 | 3.67 |
Jaxon warns Georgia Kent, "lots of wolves out", but she's "a bad bitch." A hooded assailant kills her. The MLI Detective says, "she died painfully", beaten to death. Roommate Perry mentions Georgia's stalker. They chase Randall Pike, who attempts suicide, admitting obsession, but she was seeing some "handsome guy". Pike's wife alibis him. The M.E. finds DNA underneath Georgia's fingernails. A friend says Georgia was raped. Brady, suspecting a serial offender, gets a familial match through a private database, his aunt Vanessa Burke. Confronted with video of Georgia at his condo, Carter Mills is arrested, but he lawyers up. Maroun learns, Carter's DNA matches the murder of her sister Christina twelve years ago. Calling Brady's commercial genealogical search illegal, Judge Erica Foster grants Defense Attorney Nicole Potter's motion to suppress DNA, and also Georgia's blood on Mill's shoe, since the warrant was predicated by DNA. Determined, Maroun finds video of Mills talking, a block from the murder, to doorman Peter Dagnello, who positively identifies him, but Baxter learns, Maroun "tainted the identification." Baxter claims he once ignored exculpatory evidence and looked the other way, but Price cannot. Mills is found not guilty, but soon found shot dead. Price suspects Maroun. Cast: Final appearance of Mehcad Brooks as Detective Jalen Shaw.

== Production ==
On March 21, 2024, the series was renewed for a 24th season. Near the end of the 2023–2024 broadcast TV season, it was announced that showrunner/executive producer Rick Eid would be departing the FBI flagship series to focus solely on running Law & Order and creating new projects. "After six years of running two, or more, shows, and CBS now picking up FBI for three more years, this was the perfect time for me to step back and focus my efforts on running Law & Order and developing new projects," Eid stated. Creator of both franchises, Dick Wolf, said in a statement, "Rick has been a core member of the Wolf family for two decades. We thank him for all the work he did on FBI to get the series launched and look forward to continuing our creative partnership on Law & Order and beyond."

Production on this season began on July 11, 2024. On July 22, 2024, it was announced that Maura Tierney was joining the cast this season, portraying a new police lieutenant. Tierney replaces Camryn Manheim (Lieutenant Kate Dixon), who departed at the end of the previous season. Showrunner/executive producer Rick Eid described Tierney's character, Lieutenant Jessica Brady, as "a real straight shooter," further stating that, "She's results oriented, and she's a little idiosyncratic and kind of does things her own way." Eid also noted that Brady and the detectives will be "feeling each other out" at the start of the season, describing that their relationship is "not too great early on." Eid also teased fans will learn what happened with Dixon in the premiere episode.

In the second episode of the series, Mariska Hargitay and Elizabeth Marvel portrayed their roles as Captain Olivia Benson and Defense Attorney Rita Calhoun from Law & Order: Special Victims Unit, respectively. Showrunner/executive producer Rick Eid told Give Me My Remote that Hargitay is "a really integral part of the episode," and that she would have meaningful scenes with Hugh Dancy, Tony Goldwyn and the newest addition to the cast, Maura Tierney. Eid citing the scenes are "pretty intense, and there's a lot of conflict going on." Marvel – who previously portrayed a different defense attorney in the original series run as well as multiple different characters across the original, Criminal Intent and even SVU series – would be reprising her role as Rita Calhoun, her last appearance being in SVU's twenty-second season episode, "The Long Arm of the Witness" until the crossovsr episode "Play with Fire Part 2". Eid further noted that it was Olivia Benson's presence in the episode that prompted the move to bring Calhoun to the flagship. Eid previewed, "[Benson]'s got a relationship with the defendant. We were thinking about casting the attorney, and given the facts of the case – and what's really going on in the case – we thought that character that Elizabeth plays would be perfect, especially given that she's got a pre-existing relationship with Benson. It just felt like a natural thing to do, so we're excited about that."

In another episode the series cast Ryan Eggold, star of NBC's crime drama The Blacklist and NBC's medical drama, New Amsterdam, as Matt Riley, brother of Detective Vincent Riley (Reid Scott). Rick Eid teased, "[He's got] one foot in the criminal world. His brother ends up being involved in the case [they're investigating], and we ultimately need his help to solve the case."

On July 18, it was announced that Mehcad Brooks was leaving after three seasons, a "mutual decision" for both the actor and producers.

== Ratings ==
Viewership and ratings per episode of Law & Order season 24
| No. | Title | Air date | Rating (18–49) | Viewers (millions) | DVR (18–49) | DVR viewers (millions) | Total (18–49) | Total viewers (millions) |
|---|---|---|---|---|---|---|---|---|
| 1 | "Catch and Kill" | October 3, 2024 | 0.4/4 | 3.64 | —N/a | —N/a | —N/a | —N/a |
| 2 | "The Perfect Man" | October 10, 2024 | 0.3/3 | 3.45 | —N/a | —N/a | —N/a | —N/a |
| 3 | "Big Brother" | October 17, 2024 | 0.3/3 | 3.09 | 0.1 | 1.27 | 0.4 | 4.37 |
| 4 | "The Meaning of Life" | October 24, 2024 | 0.3/3 | 3.33 | 0.1 | 1.30 | 0.4 | 4.63 |
| 5 | "Report Card" | October 31, 2024 | 0.3/3 | 3.62 | 0.1 | 1.22 | 0.4 | 4.84 |
| 6 | "Time Will Tell" | November 7, 2024 | 0.3/3 | 3.49 | 0.2 | 1.35 | 0.5 | 4.84 |
| 7 | "Truth and Consequences" | November 14, 2024 | 0.3/3 | 3.35 | 0.1 | 1.37 | 0.4 | 4.72 |
| 8 | "Bad Apple" | November 21, 2024 | 0.3/3 | 3.76 | 0.1 | 1.31 | 0.4 | 5.07 |
| 9 | "Enemy of the State" | January 16, 2025 | 0.3/5 | 4.16 | 0.1 | 1.34 | 0.5 | 5.49 |
| 10 | "Greater Good" | January 23, 2025 | 0.3/4 | 4.33 | 0.1 | 1.27 | 0.4 | 5.60 |
| 11 | "The Hardest Thing" | January 30, 2025 | 0.3/5 | 4.12 | 0.2 | 1.23 | 0.5 | 5.35 |
| 12 | "Duty to Protect" | February 13, 2025 | 0.4/5 | 4.19 | 0.1 | 1.28 | 0.5 | 5.48 |
| 13 | "In God We Trust" | February 20, 2025 | 0.3/4 | 4.09 | 0.1 | 1.26 | 0.5 | 5.35 |
| 14 | "A Price to Pay" | February 27, 2025 | 0.3/5 | 4.03 | 0.1 | 1.21 | 0.4 | 5.24 |
| 15 | "Crossing Lines" | March 13, 2025 | 0.3/4 | 3.53 | 0.1 | 1.28 | 0.4 | 4.80 |
| 16 | "Folk Hero" | March 20, 2025 | 0.3/3 | 3.82 | 0.1 | 1.28 | 0.4 | 5.10 |
| 17 | "A Perfect Family" | April 3, 2025 | 0.3/4 | 3.66 | 0.1 | 1.38 | 0.4 | 5.03 |
| 18 | "Inherent Bias" | April 10, 2025 | 0.3/4 | 3.66 | 0.1 | 1.26 | 0.4 | 4.92 |
| 19 | "Play with Fire Part 1" | April 17, 2025 | 0.3/5 | 3.97 | 0.1 | 1.26 | 0.4 | 5.23 |
| 20 | "Sins of the Father" | May 1, 2025 | 0.3/4 | 3.55 | 0.1 | 1.35 | 0.4 | 4.90 |
| 21 | "Tough Love" | May 8, 2025 | 0.3/5 | 3.45 | 0.1 | 1.37 | 0.4 | 4.82 |
| 22 | "Look the Other Way" | May 15, 2025 | 0.3/4 | 3.67 | 0.1 | 1.20 | 0.3 | 4.86 |

== Notes ==
- The show's intro is redesigned (new shots of a modern Manhattan skyline, and the Brooklyn Bridge replaces the traditional RFK/Triboro Bridge shot).
