= Chicago P.D. season 10 =

Chicago P.D.
- Season 10
- Chicago P.D. Season 10 DVD cover
- Showrunner: Gwen Sigan
- Starring: Jason Beghe; Jesse Lee Soffer; Tracy Spiridakos; Marina Squerciati; Patrick John Flueger; LaRoyce Hawkins; Benjamin Levy Aguilar; Amy Morton
- No. of episodes: 22

Release
- Original network: NBC
- Original release: September 21, 2022 – May 24, 2023

Season chronology
- ← Previous; Season 9 Next → Season 11

The tenth season of the American police procedural television series Chicago P.D. premiered on September 21, 2022, on NBC, for the 2022–23 television season. The season concluded on May 24, 2023. The season contained 22 episodes.

Chicago P.D. revolves around the members of the Intelligence Unit of the 21st District of the Chicago Police Department. The season stars Jason Beghe, Jesse Lee Soffer, Tracy Spiridakos, Marina Squerciati, Patrick John Flueger, LaRoyce Hawkins, Benjamin Levy Aguilar, and Amy Morton. Aguilar joined the series prior to the season premiere, after guest-starring in an episode of the previous season, while Soffer departed the series following the third episode. This season also includes the 200th episode of the series.

Jason Beghe, who plays Hank Voight, is credited as an Executive Producer starting from this season onwards.

== Cast and characters ==
=== Main ===
- Jason Beghe as Sergeant Henry "Hank" Voight
- Jesse Lee Soffer as Detective Jay Halstead (Episodes 1–3)
- Tracy Spiridakos as Detective Hailey Upton
- Marina Squerciati as Officer Kim Burgess
- Patrick John Flueger as Officer Adam Ruzek
- LaRoyce Hawkins as Officer Kevin Atwater
- Benjamin Levy Aguilar as Officer Dante Torres
- Amy Morton as Desk Sergeant Trudy Platt

=== Guest ===
- Michael Gaston as Chief Patrick O'Neal

=== Crossover ===
- Nick Gehlfuss as Dr. Will Halstead

== Episodes ==
No. overall	No. in season	Title	Directed by	Written by	Original release date	Prod. code	U.S. viewers (millions)
187	1	"Let It Bleed"	Chad Saxton	Gwen Sigan	September 21, 2022	1001	5.48
Still reeling from the death of informant Anna Avalos, Voight faces a new threat as he tries to keep the neighbourhood clean from drugs as new wrinkles develop in the Upton, Halstead and Voight dynamic while the team gets a new chief and receive awards for their efforts in bringing down drug kingpin Javier Escano.
188	2	"The Real You"	Lisa Robinson	Gavin Harris	September 28, 2022	1002	5.32
A convicted murderer - with the testimony of Ruzek - manages to hijack his prison van after the trial and kidnaps one of the guards. The intelligence unit teams up to find him and the kidnapped guard, only to discover things aren't what they appear to be while Burgess pushes Ruzek due to his motives in this case, creating tension between them as Dante Torres officially joins Intelligence.
189	3	"A Good Man"	Carl Seaton	Scott Gold	October 5, 2022	1003	5.95
The team investigates a string of brutal pharmacy robberies and after Halstead gets into a fight with a suspect, stabbing the man to death, he makes a life-changing decision. Note: This is Jesse Lee Soffer's final appearance.
190	4	"Dónde Vives"	Brenna Malloy	Kevin Deiboldt	October 12, 2022	1004	5.65
A murder sends Torres into his neighborhood as Voight and Atwater help him with both the case and managing personal dynamics.
191	5	"Pink Cloud"	Chad Saxton	Gwen Sigan	October 19, 2022	1005	5.58
Upton's lone pursuit of a teenage girl who's disappeared leads Intelligence into the dark web of human trafficking while Chief O'Neal becomes involved after learning his son, Sean is connected to the missing teenager.
192	6	"Sympathetic Reflex"	Bethany Rooney	Ike Smith	November 2, 2022	1006	5.06
Atwater's reactions during a tense arrest are called into question. Intelligence continues to secretly investigate Sean O'Neal and his involvement in a human trafficking operation.
193	7	"Into the Deep"	Takashi Doscher	Scott Gold	November 9, 2022	1007	4.69
Upon learning evidence against Sean O'Neal has surfaced, Intelligence work in secret to build a case, only to discover Sean is more dangerous than they expected.
194	8	"Under the Skin"	Marc Roskin	Gavin Harris	November 16, 2022	1008	5.39
In an attempt to divert Intelligence from investigating his son, Chief O'Neal diverts them to a dead fish case that soon grows complicated with difficult memories being triggered for Burgess.
195	9	"Proof of Burden"	Chad Saxton	Gwen Sigan	December 7, 2022	1009	5.39
After making a shocking discovery, Intelligence edge closer to bringing down Sean O'Neal which has O'Neal's father, Chief O'Neal making a decision that threatens the case.
196	10	"This Job"	John Hyams	Jeffrey M. Lee	January 4, 2023	1010	5.59
Intelligence investigate a series of brutal home invasion robberies with the team pairing with Detective Borkowski, an old friend of Ruzek's and as the case progresses, Torres finds himself clashing with Borkowski when it becomes clear the two men have different styles to policing.
197	11	"Long Lost"	Oz Scott	Kevin Deiboldt	January 11, 2023	1011	5.45
While on a surveillance of a funeral, Atwater and Burgess partially witness a reckless drive by ambush shooting that kills the pastor and a gang leader. Atwater is forced to renew his relationship with his, recently released from prison, father who can identify the shooter.
198	12	"I Can Let You Go"	Gia-Rayne B. Harris	Teleplay by : Scott Gold; Story by : Gwen Sigan & Scott Gold	January 18, 2023	1012	5.58
Upton tries to let the Chief's son go but its hard for her to do so.
199	13	"The Ghost in You"	Benny Boom	Gavin Harris	February 15, 2023	1013	5.20
Voight continues his relationship with his Attorney friend.
200	14	"Trapped"	Chad Saxton	Gwen Sigan	February 22, 2023	1014	5.71
In Chicago P.D.'s 200th episode, Burgess and Ruzek are stuck on a crowded subway train after a horrific shooting and the team uncovers dark family secrets as they piece together the mystery. Burgess is trapped inside a hole with a young boy and has a panic attack. Later, she deals with PTSD. She is comforted by the team and Ruzek as she gets back to normalcy.
201	15	"Blood and Honor"	Vince Misiano	Gwen Sigan & Kevin Deiboldt	March 1, 2023	1015	5.03
The team investigates the poisoning deaths of a family who shared space in a building that housed a meth lab that has a connection to Samantha Beck. They devise a ruse to ingratiate Ruzek with Samantha as he goes undercover to infiltrate the Becks' operation.
202	16	"Deadlocked"	Jesse Lee Soffer	Matthew Brown	March 22, 2023	1016	4.97
Voight takes the stand for ASA Chapman in a high-stakes murder trial against notorious drug kingpin Arturo Morales. When it becomes clear that Morales and his henchmen have compromised a juror, Voight and the team work furiously to ensure justice prevails. The team gets assistance on a case.
203	17	"Out of the Depths"	Guy Ferland	Elena Perez	March 29, 2023	1017	5.20
The team is challenged on a new case involving a convenience store robbery and beating, and the evidence leads the team to an unusual pair of suspects, revealing a dark personal drama and another potential victim. Burgess continues to make progress, therapeutically addressing her past trauma issues.
204	18	"You Only Die Twice"	Jon Cassar	Gavin Harris	April 5, 2023	1018	5.04
Ruzek becomes suspicious as he works on a new case.
205	19	"The Bleed Valve"	Bethany Rooney	Scott Gold	May 3, 2023	1019	5.01
Atwater's world falls apart when a shooting at the building he owns in Burnside results in a dead boy, and Atwater must confront his relationship with his dad as they continue to work together.
206	20	"Fight"	Victor Macias	Sean Collins-Smith	May 10, 2023	1020	4.87
Upton is unwittingly caught in the crosshairs as she works on a new case.
207	21	"New Life"	Carl Seaton	Gavin Harris	May 17, 2023	1021	4.91
After attending a baptism in his neighborhood, Torres finds himself in the midst of a murder case that hits close to home and threatens to expose his troubled past and his association with the murder victim, a local gang leader Ariza. As Torres struggles to reconcile his old life with his new one, Voight keeps a watchful eye and decides to keep Torres on, after learning the truth from Torres about his checkered past.
208	22	"A Better Place"	Chad Saxton	Teleplay by : Gwen Sigan; Story by : Brian Luce	May 24, 2023	1022	4.76
As Richard Beck's timeline for a deadly terrorist attack moves up, Samantha panics causing Ruzek to break cover and arrest her. The team then scrambles to get ahead of Beck's unprecedented scheduled attack, which would result in innocent school children getting killed. Meanwhile, Ruzek is shot at Sam's home, by her son Callum, during their extraction and then he is left to die. When the team arrives Ruzek is immediately rushed to Chicago Med for surgery. Beck attempts to escape using his grandson as a shield, but Atwater fatally shoots him.

== Production ==
=== Development ===
On February 27, 2020, it was announced that NBC had renewed Chicago P.D. through a tenth season. The season is set to contain the two-hundredth episode of the series.

=== Casting ===
In July 2022, it was reported by Deadline Hollywood that Benjamin Levy Aguilar, who plays Officer Dante Torres, had been promoted to a series regular after first appearing as a guest-star during the previous season. The following month, it was revealed by Variety that Jesse Lee Soffer, who had portrayed Detective Jay Halstead since the series debut in 2014, would be leaving early in the tenth season. Soffer made his final appearance with the third episode of the season, "A Good Man", on October 5, 2022.

== Awards ==
On March 7, 2024, Episode 21, "New Life", won a Movieguide Award for "Best TV for Mature Audiences".

== Release and marketing ==
On May 16, 2022, it was revealed that the series would keep its Wednesday 10:00 PM ET timeslot, continuing to lead out of fellow Chicago franchise series Chicago Med and Chicago Fire. On June 29, 2022, the season was given a premiere date of September 21, 2022. After previously being available to stream on Hulu, all episodes from the season will begin streaming exclusively on Peacock the day after each episode airs on NBC.

== Ratings ==
Viewership and ratings per episode of Chicago P.D. season 10
No.	Title	Air date	Rating (18–49)	Viewers (millions)	DVR (18–49)	DVR viewers (millions)	Total (18–49)	Total viewers (millions)
1	"Let It Bleed"	September 21, 2022	0.7	5.48	0.5	3.25	1.2	8.73
2	"The Real You"	September 28, 2022	0.7	5.32	0.5	2.93	1.1	8.25
3	"A Good Man"	October 5, 2022	0.7	5.95	0.5	3.01	1.2	8.96
4	"Dónde Vives"	October 12, 2022	0.6	5.65	0.5	2.87	1.1	8.52
5	"Pink Cloud"	October 19, 2022	0.6	5.58	0.5	2.89	1.1	8.47
6	"Sympathetic Reflex"	November 2, 2022	0.5	5.06	0.6	3.07	1.1	8.13
7	"Into the Deep"	November 9, 2022	0.5	4.69	0.5	3.25	1.1	7.94
8	"Under the Skin"	November 16, 2022	0.6	5.39	0.5	3.07	1.1	8.45
9	"Proof of Burden"	December 7, 2022	0.6	5.39	—N/a	—N/a	—N/a	—N/a
10	"This Job"	January 4, 2023	0.6	5.59	0.5	3.11	1.0	8.70
11	"Long Lost"	January 11, 2023	0.6	5.45	0.5	3.25	1.1	8.70
12	"I Can Let You Go"	January 18, 2023	0.6	5.58	0.5	3.23	1.0	8.81
13	"The Ghost in You"	February 15, 2023	0.5	5.20	—N/a	—N/a	—N/a	—N/a
14	"Trapped"	February 22, 2023	0.6	5.71	—N/a	—N/a	—N/a	—N/a
15	"Blood and Honor"	March 1, 2023	0.6	5.03	—N/a	—N/a	—N/a	—N/a
16	"Deadlocked"	March 22, 2023	0.5	4.97	—N/a	—N/a	—N/a	—N/a
17	"Out of the Depths"	March 29, 2023	0.6	5.20	—N/a	—N/a	—N/a	—N/a
18	"You Only Die Twice"	April 5, 2023	0.4	5.04	—N/a	—N/a	—N/a	—N/a
19	"The Bleed Valve"	May 3, 2023	0.5	5.01	—N/a	—N/a	—N/a	—N/a
20	"Fight"	May 10, 2023	0.5	4.87	—N/a	—N/a	—N/a	—N/a
21	"New Life"	May 17, 2023	0.5	4.91	—N/a	—N/a	—N/a	—N/a
22	"A Better Place"	May 24, 2023	0.5	4.76	—N/a	—N/a	—N/a	—N/a
