= Jennifer Vanderbes =

American novelist

- Born: New York City, U.S.
- Education: Yale University (BA); Iowa Writers' Workshop (MFA)
- Occupations: Novelist; journalist; screenwriter

Jennifer Vanderbes is an American novelist, journalist and screenwriter.

== Biography ==
=== Early life ===
Vanderbes was born in New York City. She attended the Dalton School and earned a B.A. in English magna cum laude from Yale University. While at Yale, she began writing for the Yale Daily News and was featured on CBS Evening News for her investigation into a suspicious egg donor agency that was then closed down due to her reporting. She graduated from Yale in seven semesters, and worked at CNN during her junior year. After Yale, Vanderbes worked as a reporter for the Pittsburgh Post Gazette before moving to Iowa City to attend the Iowa Writers' Workshop as a Truman Capote Fellow.

=== Career ===
After receiving her MFA in Fiction Writing from the Iowa Writers' Workshop, where she studied with Pulitzer Prize-winner Marilynne Robinson, Vanderbes was awarded creative writing fellowships at the University of Wisconsin and Colgate University.

In 2003, her debut novel Easter Island (Dial Press) was named one of the best books of the year by The Christian Science Monitor and The Washington Post Book World, and was translated into sixteen languages. The novel combines adventure, mystery, and archaeology in several plotlines linked to Easter Island, the remote South Pacific island famed for its immense Moai (statues). Vanderbes was named to People Magazine's annual "It List".

In 2007, Vanderbes published her second book, Strangers at the Feast. The novel depicts two Connecticut families, one white and one black, connected by gentrification and a horrific crime on Thanksgiving Day in 2007. Oprah Magazine called it "a thriller that also raises large and haunting questions about the meaning of guilt, innocence, and justice."

Her third novel, The Secret of Raven Point (2014), follows a young WWII army nurse determined to find her older brother who's gone missing in action in Italy. The New York Times celebrated the "two separate mysteries [that] create and maintain suspense throughout this gripping World War II coming-of-age novel." The Washington Post called it “fresh, compelling...Vanderbes performs admirably.” Library Journal raved, "Readers will fall in love with the delightful Juliet, who is a smart and courageous heroine....the only disappointing thing about this book is that it has to end."

During graduate school, Vanderbes wrote a one-act play called "The Applicant" which was produced by the Soho Rep theater in New York. In 2014, she returned to playwriting, and her two-act play, Primating, about primatologists in Africa, was optioned by Tony Award-winning producers Jeffrey Richards Associates. The play revolves around two of the world's leading primatologists, who reunite at a chimp reserve twenty-five years after a dashed love affair. In a full-blown battle of the sexes - and wits - they pit man against woman and ape against man. The play had its world premiere in August 2021 at the Arkansas Repertory Theater in Little Rock, Arkansas, celebrated by Broadway World as a "very smart, witty play."

She also writes for film and television, developing projects with HBO, Netflix, Bravo, TriStar, Fox and Paramount. In March 2022 she was named an Athena List winner for a biopic she wrote for Paramount. In July 2022, she won a New York Foundation for the Arts Playwriting/Screenwriting Prize. In November 2022, the Hollywood Reporter announced her as the winner of the Athena Film Festival's Sloan Development prize. She has served a writer and Producer on NBC's Law & Order for several seasons.

Vanderbes has been awarded a Guggenheim Fiction Fellowship, a New York Public Library Cullman Center Fellowship, and an Alfred P. Sloan Foundation Book Grant.

Her short fiction has appeared in Granta, Fantasy & Science Fiction, and Best New American Voices 2000. Her nonfiction has appeared in The New York Times, The Wall Street Journal, and The Atlantic.

Her first investigative non-fiction book, Wonder Drug: The Secret History of Thalidomide in America and Its Hidden Victims, was published by Random House and HarperCollins UK in June 2023. Publishers Weekly called the book "a deeply researched and chilling must-read." People magazine called Wonder Drug "fascinating and compassionate". Vanderbes was named an NEH Public Scholar for her investigation into the thalidomide scandal and the book was long-listed for the 2024 Andrew Carnegie Medal for Excellence in Nonfiction.

She lives in New York City.
