= Wonder Drug (book) =

Nonfiction book by Jennifer Vanderbes

Wonder Drug: The Secret History of Thalidomide in America and Its Hidden Victims
- Author: Jennifer Vanderbes
- Language: English
- Published: 2023
- Publisher: Random House
- Publication place: US

Wonder Drug: The Secret History of Thalidomide in America and Its Hidden Victims is a nonfiction book authored by Jennifer Vanderbes and published by Random House in 2023. It tells the story of how Frances Oldham Kelsey of the Food and Drug Administration (FDA) found flaws in thalidomide research. Contrary to the initial opinion that the FDA declined the drug a license for morning sickness in pregnancy and the US was therefore spared the thalidomide scandal, Vanderbes claims that the drug was still widely distributed there in the late 1950s and 1960s. As a result, many more babies were affected by phocomelia than originally believed.
