= Chicago P.D. season 9 =

Season of television series

Chicago P.D.
- Season 9
- Chicago P.D. Season 9 DVD cover
- Showrunners: Rick Eid; Gwen Sigan
- No. of episodes: 22

Release
- Original network: NBC
- Original release: September 22, 2021 – May 25, 2022

Season chronology
- ← Previous; Season 8 Next → Season 10

The ninth season of Chicago P.D., an American police drama television series with executive producer Dick Wolf, and producers Derek Haas, Michael Brandt, and Rick Eid was ordered on February 27, 2020, by NBC. The season premiered on September 22, 2021.

== Cast ==
=== Regular cast members ===
- Jason Beghe as Sergeant Henry "Hank" Voight
- Jesse Lee Soffer as Detective Jay Halstead
- Tracy Spiridakos as Detective Hailey Upton
- Marina Squerciati as Officer Kim Burgess
- Patrick John Flueger as Officer Adam Ruzek
- LaRoyce Hawkins as Officer Kevin Atwater
- Amy Morton as Desk Sergeant Trudy Platt

=== Recurring guest characters ===
- Nicole Ari Parker as Deputy Superintendent Samantha Miller
- Ramona Edith Williams as Makayla Burgess
- Carmela Zumbado as Anna Avalos
- Alex Morf as FBI Special Agent Walker North
- Amanda Payton as Celeste Nichols
- Ryan Spahn as Charlie Kalzenski

=== Crossover characters ===
- Guy Lockard as Dr. Dylan Scott

== Episodes ==
No. overall	No. in season	Title	Directed by	Written by	Original release date	Prod. code	U.S. viewers (millions)
165	1	"Closure"	Vince Misiano	Rick Eid & Gwen Sigan	September 22, 2021	901	6.54
As Burgess fights for her life at Chicago Med, Ruzek tries to deal with the stress of seeing someone he cares about hurt while trying to keep Burgess' daughter Makayla from finding out. Voight and Upton clash over how to handle the fallout of their actions the night prior, when Upton killed Burgess' assailant, Roy Walton, in self-defense after Voight had subjected him to a rogue interrogation and Voight disposed of his body. Meanwhile, Deputy Superintendent Miller insists that Walton be brought to justice for the murders of her son and three others. Circumstances are complicated when an associate of Walton's takes a woman hostage and demands to expose Voight's and Upton's actions in exchange for her safety.
166	2	"Rage"	Chad Saxton	Gavin Harris & Matthew Newman	September 29, 2021	902	6.22
The rape and murder of a CI who was working with Ruzek turns out to be one of several seemingly random sexual assaults and homicides where the victims were all ex-cons with the same parole officer. When one victim manages to escape the assailant, Voight asks for Burgess' help in getting her to identify him. After meeting with the victim, Burgess becomes determined to restore her sense of safety. Meanwhile, Burgess continues to cope with her injuries, albeit with Ruzek's support, and worries for her future with the Intelligence Unit.
167	3	"The One Next to Me"	Bethany Rooney	Scott Gold	October 6, 2021	903	5.75
Halstead is forced to relive his past when his ex-army colleague is being investigated by the Chicago police about a deadly blast that he was involved in. Grief and regret about her role in Walton's death begin to take a heavy toll on Upton.
168	4	"In the Dark"	Carl Seaton	Gwen Sigan	October 13, 2021	904	5.98
Upton considers telling Halstead about killing Walton as the regret comes at standing point when a suspect almost commits suicide while in custody when Upton reveals more information than she should. Halstead begins to suspect that Voight might have been involved. Meanwhile, the Intelligence unit investigate young children getting trafficked by older men. Later, Upton snaps at the suspect and has a panic attack and Jay confronts Voight and punches him.
169	5	"Burnside"	Brenna Malloy	Ike Smith	October 20, 2021	905	5.57
The Intelligence unit investigates a deadly shooting. Later on, Atwater discovers that his new love interest might have a connection to the case and is forced to go undercover.
170	6	"End of Watch"	Marc Roskin	Gavin Harris	October 27, 2021	906	5.62
Ruzek runs into a police officer who mentored him years ago and asks him for help with a case involving organized crime. Voight and Burgess suspect that the officer's recent financial problems have caused him to lose his "real police" persona and may hinder the resolution of the case.
171	7	"Trust Me"	Chad Saxton	Matthew Newman	November 3, 2021	907	5.58
The Intelligence unit investigates a drug ring within Chicago and Voight turns to a confidential informant for help with the case. Voight soon discovers that his CI might be involved in drug ring herself.
172	8	"Fractures"	Charles S. Carroll	Scott Gold	November 10, 2021	908	5.58
Voight receives news that the FBI is investigating the disappearance of Roy Walton with the rest of the Intelligence unit's cooperation. Upton begins to worry for her and Halstead's jobs as the investigation carries on. Meanwhile, the team investigates the stabbing of a father in front of his two young daughters.
173	9	"A Way Out"	Lisa Robinson	Gwen Sigan	December 8, 2021	909	5.64
The intelligence unit investigates the shooting on a local city bus that leaves the bus driver dead. Meanwhile, with the FBI closing in, Voight and Halstead try to come up with a plan to get themselves and Upton in the clear. The episode ends with Upton and Halstead revealing that they have secretly gotten married.
174	10	"Home Safe"	Lisa Demaine	Elena Perez	January 5, 2022	910	6.06
The Intelligence unit searches for a missing child for what turns out to be complicated and uncomfortable situation. Meanwhile, Ruzek and Burgess are shocked to discover that Makayla's uncle is seeking custody. Also, Halstead and Upton reveal their marriage to the unit.
175	11	"Lies"	Eif Rivera	Teleplay by : Ike Smith; Story by : Gavin Harris & Ike Smith	January 12, 2022	911	5.81
The Unit investigates a drug trafficking case with ties to underground cage fighting. Atwater struggles with whether or not to reveal his profession to his girlfriend, Celeste, and makes a decision.
176	12	"To Protect"	Bethany Rooney	Gavin Harris	January 19, 2022	912	5.79
Voight takes another stab at bringing down the violent Los Temidos gang but worries that his CI, Anna Avalos's past experiences with the gang may make her a liability when she is threatened while undercover.
177	13	"Still Water"	Chad Saxton	Gwen Sigan	February 23, 2022	913	6.01
Upton witnesses an out-of-control car crash into the Chicago River and jumps in to the rescue, but she is forced to abandon one of the two trapped occupants and later learns something horrifying about the person that she was able to save.
178	14	"Blood Relation"	Guy Ferland	Scott Gold	March 2, 2022	914	5.81
The Intelligence Unit finds itself on the trail of a crafty cultist who brainwashed and uses down and out women to murder those he felt has wronged him. Meanwhile, Burgess, with Ruzek's support, battles Makayla's biological uncle for custody and wins, but as she and Ruzek return home to celebrate, they find Makayla's sitter horribly wounded and Makayla is missing.
179	15	"Gone"	Brenna Malloy	Matthew Newman	March 9, 2022	915	6.38
The unit rushes to discover who abducted Makayla and learn that her incarcerated biological father, Tariq, orchestrated the kidnapping to ransom money from Theo, Makayla's uncle, in order to pay off his prison debts; meanwhile, Burgess and Ruzek clash over how to get Makayla back.
180	16	"Closer"	Chad Saxton	Gwen Sigan	March 16, 2022	916	5.33
When a young man is fatally shot outside the bakery of Javier Eskano, the Los Temidos kingpin the Intelligence Unit is investigating, Voight leans on his CI Anna to figure out if the shooter and Eskano are connected. Complications and suspicions arise when the shooter, wounded earlier by Halstead, returns to the bakery seeking aid, forcing Voight and Anna to make some tough decisions in order to get closer to Eskano.
181	17	"Adrift"	Marc Roskin	Gavin Harris	April 6, 2022	917	5.71
Ruzek's search for Olivia, the daughter of his former English teacher, leads the team into a serious drug investigation involving a paranoid dealer and while undercover, Ruzek is forced to take a deadly risk to protect Olivia. Meanwhile, Ruzek and Burgess are at odds on how to cope with the traumatic aftermath of Makayla's abduction.
182	18	"New Guard"	Takashi Doscher	Scott Gold	April 13, 2022	918	5.92
Halstead recruits Dante Torres from the police academy, both work together with the rest of the intelligence unit during an investigation. However, Halstead and the rest of the team grow more concerned about Torres past.
183	19	"Fool's Gold"	Bethany Rooney	Ike Smith	April 20, 2022	919	6.08
When a wealthy resident is found dead, the intelligence unit investigates to discover the truth, suspecting that there may be more to the story than meets the eye.
184	20	"Memory"	Benny Boom	Gwen Sigan	May 11, 2022	920	5.56
Voight and the intelligence unit investigate a cold case to find clues to this new shocking crime; with the main objective being buried memories, the case also has Burgess and Ruzek concerned about Makayla's mental healing.
185	21	"House of Cards"	Vince Misiano	Gavin Harris	May 18, 2022	921	5.47
As the team closes in on drug kingpin Javier Escano, Voight is forced to lie to his undercover informant Anna to keep her on track; their deteriorating trust threatens an increasingly tenuous operation. (Part 1 of 2)
186	22	"You and Me"	Chad Saxton	Gwen Sigan	May 25, 2022	922	5.98
After an explosion rocks the case, the team scrambles to finally take down Escano as everyone nears their breaking point. (Part 2 of 2)

== Ratings ==
Viewership and ratings per episode of Chicago P.D. season 9
No.	Title	Air date	Rating (18–49)	Viewers (millions)	DVR (18–49)	DVR viewers (millions)	Total (18–49)	Total viewers (millions)
1	"Closure"	September 22, 2021	0.9	6.54	—N/a	3.66	—N/a	10.20
2	"Rage"	September 29, 2021	0.8	6.22	—N/a	3.67	—N/a	9.89
3	"The One Next to Me"	October 6, 2021	0.8	5.75	—N/a	—N/a	—N/a	—N/a
4	"In the Dark"	October 13, 2021	0.7	5.98	0.5	3.06	1.2	9.05
5	"Burnside"	October 20, 2021	0.7	5.57	0.6	3.26	1.3	8.83
6	"End of Watch"	October 27, 2021	0.7	5.62	—N/a	3.34	—N/a	8.96
7	"Trust Me"	November 3, 2021	0.7	5.58	—N/a	—N/a	—N/a	—N/a
8	"Fractures"	November 10, 2021	0.7	5.58	—N/a	—N/a	—N/a	—N/a
9	"A Way Out"	December 8, 2021	0.7	5.64	0.6	3.45	1.3	9.10
10	"Home Safe"	January 5, 2022	0.7	6.06	—N/a	3.45	—N/a	9.52
11	"Lies"	January 12, 2022	0.7	5.81	—N/a	—N/a	—N/a	—N/a
12	"To Protect"	January 19, 2022	0.7	5.79	—N/a	—N/a	—N/a	—N/a
13	"Still Water"	February 23, 2022	0.7	6.01	—N/a	—N/a	—N/a	—N/a
14	"Blood Relation"	March 2, 2022	0.8	5.81	—N/a	3.34	—N/a	9.20
15	"Gone"	March 9, 2022	0.9	6.38	—N/a	3.28	—N/a	9.66
16	"Closer"	March 16, 2022	0.7	5.33	—N/a	—N/a	—N/a	—N/a
17	"Adrift"	April 6, 2022	0.7	5.71	—N/a	—N/a	—N/a	—N/a
18	"New Guard"	April 13, 2022	0.7	5.92	—N/a	—N/a	—N/a	—N/a
19	"Fool's Gold"	April 20, 2022	0.7	6.08	—N/a	—N/a	—N/a	—N/a
20	"Memory"	May 11, 2022	0.7	5.56	—N/a	—N/a	—N/a	—N/a
21	"House of Cards"	May 18, 2022	0.7	5.47	—N/a	—N/a	—N/a	—N/a
22	"You and Me"	May 25, 2022	0.7	5.98	—N/a	—N/a	—N/a	—N/a
