= Miracle Drug (disambiguation) =

"Miracle Drug" is a song by U2 from their album, How to Dismantle an Atomic Bomb.

Miracle drug may also refer to

- "Miracle Drug," a song by A.C. Newman from his album The Slow Wonder
- The previous band name for the American band Hot Chelle Rae

== Drugs ==
- Aspirin, used to reduce pain, fever, and/or inflammation, and as an antithrombotic
- Penicillin, used for different bacterial infections
- Trastuzumab, used to treat breast cancer and stomach cancer
