= Chicago Med season 12 =

Season of television series

Chicago Med
- Season 12
- Showrunner: Allen MacDonald
- Starring: Steven Weber; Jessy Schram; Luke Mitchell; Sarah Ramos; Darren Barnet; S. Epatha Merkerson; Oliver Platt
- No. of episodes: 7

Release
- Original network: NBC
- Original release: October 7, 2026 – present

Season chronology
- ← Previous; Season 11

The twelfth season of Chicago Med, an American medical drama television series with the executive producer Dick Wolf, and producers Michael Brandt, Derek Haas, Peter Jankowski and Allen MacDonald, was ordered on March 27, 2026 and began airing on October 7, 2026.

== Cast ==
=== Main characters ===
- Steven Weber as Dr. Dean Archer, Attending Physician and Board certified in Trauma Surgery
- Jessy Schram as Dr. Hannah Asher, Attending Physician and Board certified in OBGYN
- Luke Mitchell as Dr. Mitchell Ripley, Attending Physician in Emergency Medicine
- Sarah Ramos as Dr. Caitlin Lenox, Chief of Emergency Medicine
- Darren Barnet as Dr. Jonathan Frost, Emergency Pediatrics resident and former television actor
- S. Epatha Merkerson as Sharon Goodwin, former executive director of Patient and Medical Services at Gaffney Chicago Medical Center, and Current Charge Nurse
- Oliver Platt as Dr. Daniel Charles, Chief of Psychiatry at Gaffney Chicago Medical Center

=== Recurring characters ===
- Brennan Brown as Dr. Samuel Abrams, Chief of Neurosurgery
- Lorena Diaz as Doris Perez, ED Charge Nurse
- An-Li Bogan as Dr. Annie Wu, Fourth Year Resident
- Rebecca Breeds as Mallory Sloan, Temporary Director of Patient and Medical Services
- Devin Kawaoka as Dr. Kai Tanaka-Reed, General Surgery resident
- Kim Quindlen as ED Nurse Kacy
- Marie Tredway as ED Nurse Trini
- Lynnette Li as ED Nurse Nancy
- Orlagh Cassidy as Miranda Lewis, an influential board member
- Gbenga Akinnagbe as David Goodwin, Sharon's eldest son, a lawyer
- John Earl Jelks as Dr. Dennis Washington, visiting oncologist
- French Stewart as Frederick Lambert, beau of Charles' late mother
- Jodi Kingsley as Madeline Gastern, Gaffney's social worker
- Marc Grapey as Peter Kalmick, Gaffney's Head of Legal
- Jeremy Shouldis as Dr. Marty Peterson, anesthesiologist

=== Special guest stars ===
- Colin Donnell as Dr. Connor Rhodes

=== Crossover characters ===
- Amy Morton as Sgt. Trudy Platt
- Jason Beghe as Sgt. Hank Voight

== Episodes ==
No. overall	No. in season	Title	Directed by	Written by	Original airdate	Prod. code	U.S. viewers (millions)
220	1	"Shots Fired"	Anna Dokoza	Allen MacDonald	October 7, 2026	1201	5.64
A mass shooting at a wedding packs Gaffney's ED as the staff copes with budget restraints set by temporary administrator, Mallory Sloan. Archer acts as Chief while Lenox undergoes a drug trial in Zurich. Asher steps in from maternity leave to operate on the pregnant bride. Charles counsels the MIA groom. Frost treats a flower girl blinded by trauma. Ripley lays into headstrong resident, Annie Wu, after she callously administers to the shooter. Goodwin accuses board member, Miranda Lewis, of being agist and/or racist before her hearing, then learns that it was Nurse Doris who leaked the files that got her in trouble.
221	2	"Third Rails"	Anthony Nardolillo	Andrew Gettens & Lauren Mackenzie	October 14, 2026	1202	5.65
Subway surfers challenge the staff after a ride ends horribly off the tracks. Abrams is forced to treat a fatalistic teen with leeches while Asher tries to convince her to undergo life-saving surgery. Archer opposes Sloan's solution of an overflow room to clear the crowded ED. Charles and Ripley tend to an overweight mother who tries to get prescribed GLP-1 meds that will curb her alcoholism. Goodwin seeks her son David's legal advice and resigns as a ploy to uncover Lewis' true motives for getting rid of her. Frost's womanizing wears thin with his roommate, Ripley.
222	3	"They Call Me Ms. Goodwin"	Tess Malone	Stephen Hootstein	October 21, 2026	1203	5.47
Goodwin returns to Gaffney as an ED nurse backed by Archer and staff (except Wu who resents her advice). A freeway crash brings in survivors from both sides of the accident. The guilt-ridden truck driver responsible refuses a lung transplant from one of the victims. Asher and Ripley oversee expectant parents made homeless by the loss of their car. Sloan uses an algorithm to remove a battered boy from his grandmother's care despite Frost and Charles proving it is a case of numb pain receptors. Goodwin and Charles repair their strained friendship and agree to take down Lewis.
223	4	"Tomorrow, and Tomorrow, and Tomorrow"	Andi Behring	Meridith Friedman	October 28, 2026	1204	5.17
Ripley is promoted to ED Chief. Goodwin's ex, oncologist Dennis Washington, returns to Gaffney to consult on a cancer patient's misdiagnosis. Archer comforts Asher following an infant's death after delivery. Self-serving Wu discourages Frost from applying for chief resident while they co-treat a boy with a sun sensitive blood disorder. When Abrams' ex-wife is admitted, Charles talks their obsessive compulsive daughter down from a panic attack. Hospital attorney Kalmick learns Lewis' agenda is to become CEO.
224	5	"Baptism by Fire"	Anna Dokoza	Zoe Cheng	November 4, 2026	1205	5.95
Sgt. Trudy Platt joins Ripley's staff in unraveling a case of three severely burned women pulled from a fire. Frost and Wu put aside competition for chief resident to aid Max, a runaway boy tied to the victims. Each were kidnapped as girls and held as sex slaves by a predator posing as a suburban dad. Charles learns one is Max's birth mother. Frost overhears Wu relay hints of her own tragic past. Archer sits with the captive who does not survive as Goodwin and Platt view the charred bunker where the women were held.
225	6	"Lessons in Chemistry"	Rashidi Harper	Deanna Shumaker	November 11, 2026	1206	5.98
Lenox is back and asks Abrams to administer her last course of prion therapy. Frost and Wu resist bonding when they treat acid-poxed scientists who reflect their own turbulant relationship. Charles learns his late mother sponsored a hockey charity for recovering teen addicts. Ripley's patient is a notorious CEO with a brain tumor once accused of murdering his wife. Sloan regrets discharging a pregnant unhoused woman under Asher's care who is readmitted for a disasterous delivery. Goodwin and Doris discover Lewis has been manipulating the hospital's intake system based on insurance status.
226	7	"Borders and Battle Lines"	Victor Macias	Aurora Ferlin	November 18, 2026	1207	5.07
Sloan and Frederick (flamboyant beau of Charles' late mother) join Goodwin and Charles in a sting to expose Lewis' plot. Asher is influenced to propose to Archer by the love of a Lupus patient's husband who faces deportation remaining at her side. Sgt. Voight warns Frost about the underhanded urgent-care facilities he's moonlighting at to supplement his income. Lenox and Archer operate on a feuding mother and daughter who set off a land mine while hiking on a decommissioned army base. Lewis is shown the door at a board meeting and escorted off by feds.

== Production ==
=== Casting ===
Oliver Platt and S. Epatha Merkerson both signed new deals in May 2026 to return for the next season. All other cast members are expected to return, although recurring cast member Ashlei Sharpe Chestnut confirmed she would not be returning for Season 12. An-Li Bogan and Rebecca Breeds joined the cast in recurring roles as Dr. Annie Wu and Mallory Sloan. Breeds is the real life wife of regular cast member Luke Mitchell.

It was announced in October 2026 that former cast member Colin Donnell would be returning as Dr. Connor Rhodes for two episodes.

Sarah Ramos will miss episodes 2-5 due to being on maternity leave, with the writers choosing not to incorporate the pregnancy into the show. She appeared via a video call in Episode 1, with her character said to be on a medical drug trial in Zurich.
