= List of Roswell episodes =

The American science fiction television series Roswell ran between October 6, 1999, and May 14, 2002. The first two seasons aired on The WB, and the third and final season aired on UPN. The series follows the lives of teenage aliens, survivors of the 1947 UFO crash, hiding in plain sight as humans in Roswell, New Mexico.

During the course of the series, 61 episodes of Roswell aired.

== Series overview ==
Season	Episodes	Originally released		
Season	Episodes	First released	Last released	Network
1	22	October 6, 1999	May 15, 2000	The WB
2	21	October 2, 2000	May 21, 2001	The WB
3	18	October 9, 2001	May 14, 2002	UPN

== Episodes ==
=== Season 1 (1999–2000) ===
No. overall	No. in season	Title	Directed by	Written by	Original release date	Prod. code	Viewers (millions)
1	1	"Pilot"	David Nutter	Jason Katims	October 6, 1999	1ADA79	6.71
In the pilot episode of the show, Liz Parker learns Max Evans' out-of-this-world secret when he saves her life after being shot at the crash down. After saving Liz's life it rises suspicion with Sheriff Valenti. After learning where Max comes from and is sworn to secrecy Liz tells Maria after Maria kept asking questions. Now, Max, his sister Isabel, and their friend Michael must rely on them to safeguard their secret as orphaned extraterrestrials.
2	2	"The Morning After"	David Nutter	Jason Katims	October 13, 1999	1ADA01	5.44
Liz tries to maintain her relationship with Kyle despite her deep bond with Max; Michael is obsessed with the idea that there was another alien in Roswell in 1959 and tries to decipher the meaning of the flashes only he sees. Meanwhile, Liz suspects the new guidance counselor Ms. Topolsky is hiding something, especially when she sees her with Michael's file.
3	3	"Monsters"	David Semel	Jason Katims & Thania St. John	October 20, 1999	1ADA02	4.90
Isabel is concerned about Maria's nervous reactions to Sheriff Valenti after she crashes her car with her. So she invades one of Maria's dreams to determine whether she can keep the aliens' secret.
4	4	"Leaving Normal"	Chris Long	Jason Katims	October 27, 1999	1ADA03	3.81
Liz's grandmother is in town. While in town, she is rushed to the hospital after suffering a stroke prompting Liz to reach out to Max for comfort which turns out to be a bad idea, as he'd been beaten up by Kyle's friends and was having to lie low again. He tries to delay her end of life long enough for Liz to say goodbye, by healing her. He is unable to heal her but ultimately Liz is able to talk to her grandma for the very last time, in spirit form, when she dies.
5	5	"Missing"	David Semel	Jon Harmon Feldman	November 3, 1999	1ADA04	4.50
Liz discovers her personal journal, which contains all she knows about the aliens, is missing and she fears it has fallen into the hands of someone who could expose the aliens.
6	6	"285 South"	Arvin Brown	William Sind & Thania St. John	November 10, 1999	1ADA05	4.24
Michael finds a lead when his art teacher reveals information about the geodesic dome. Meanwhile, the dome continues to haunt his dreams and it forces him to hijack Maria's car with her in it all the way to Texas. Max, Isabel, and Liz follow shortly after they discover what has happened. When they all arrive together, Michael finds that the key he has opens a door to a secret underground room which could possibly holds all the answers they are looking for. While in the secret room they discover someone is really not who they say they are. To be continued...
7	7	"River Dog"	Jonathan Frakes	Cheryl Cain	November 17, 1999	1ADA06	4.24
Liz and Max journey to an American Indian reservation where they get information from an elderly tribesman about the alien who vanished in 1959 named Nasedo.
8	8	"Blood Brother"	David Nutter	Breen Frazier & Barry Pullman	November 24, 1999	1ADA07	3.58
Max is injured in a car accident and Liz pressures Alex to help protect him from medical procedures that could expose his identity by providing blood samples to replace Max's.
9	9	"Heat Wave"	Patrick Norris	Jason Katims	December 1, 1999	1ADA08	3.61
A freak December heat wave hits the town which sparks romance as Michael's relationship with Maria heats up and Liz's infatuation with Max intensifies; meanwhile Isabel enters into one of Alex's dreams only to discover she is already there, dancing with Alex.
10	10	"The Balance"	John Behring	Thania St. John	December 15, 1999	1ADA09	3.48
While at the reservation Michael ends up in an alarming hallucinatory state and the others must band together to save his life.
11	11	"Toy House"	Michael Fields	Jon Harman Feldman & Jason Katims	January 19, 2000	1ADA10	3.62
When Max rescues his mother from a kitchen fire she faces her suspicions about his extraordinary abilities; Liz reaches out to Kyle in friendship.
12	12	"Into the Woods"	Nick Marck	Thania St. John	January 26, 2000	1ADA11	3.61
A new UFO sighting sends suspicion and fear through the town and leads Max and Isabel to investigate the incident during a school camping trip.
13	13	"The Convention"	Tucker Gates	Jason Katims & Emily Whitesell	February 2, 2000	1ADA12	3.28
Max plays host to actor Jonathan Frakes at the annual UFO Convention while trying to avoid the meddlesome couple who witnessed Max's life-saving abilities on Liz at the Crashdown Cafe.
14	14	"Blind Date"	Keith Samples	Thania St. John	February 9, 2000	1ADA13	3.27
Maria enters Liz in a blind date contest; Max and Kyle commiserate about their shared feelings for Liz by getting drunk; Michael and Isabel send a signal to the fourth alien which they think fails and leaves. But right as the episode ends we see Nasedo.
15	15	"Independence Day"	Paul Shapiro	Toni Graphia	February 16, 2000	1ADA14	3.66
After Michael has a violent showdown with his father, Max and Isabel's father helps Michael set up his emancipation; the fourth alien emerges as a shape shifter who watches over Max, Michael and Isabel.
16	16	"Sexual Healing"	David Semel	Jan Oxenberg	March 1, 2000	1ADA15	3.63
Max is led to another strange alien artifact, a glowing orb as a result of the visions Liz has when they kiss. Meanwhile Liz's desire for Max reaches an all time high; Maria decides to fake visions with Michael but it does not end well.
17	17	"Crazy"	James Whitmore, Jr.	Thania St. John	April 10, 2000	1ADA16	3.78
Isabel befriends Tess, a new female student who immediately arouses Max and Michael's suspicions.
18	18	"Tess, Lies and Videotape"	Paul Shapiro	Toni Graphia & Richard Whitley	April 17, 2000	1ADA17	3.27
Max develops an uncontrollable attraction to Tess that includes intense sexual daydreams, and Sheriff Valenti learns that Topolsky was killed in a suspicious fire.
19	19	"Four Square"	Jonathan Frakes	Thania St. John	April 24, 2000	1ADA18	3.32
Harding finds the video camera hidden in his house and gives it to Valenti. The lawman then tells Max that his safety depends upon his willingness to share information. Isabel and Michael realize they are not brother and sister when they start having dreams about each other.
20	20	"Max to the Max"	Patrick Norris	Toni Graphia	May 1, 2000	1ADA19	3.47
Tess's book suggests that she and Max are predetermined mates, as are Michael and Isabel, who thinks she might be pregnant -- with Michael's baby. Meanwhile, Nasedo disguises himself as Max and kidnaps Liz as part of a plan to trap FBI agent Pierce.
21	21	"The White Room"	Jonathan Frakes	Jason Katims & Thania St. John	May 8, 2000	1ADA20	3.23
Max finds himself in a white room with no windows or doors, facing questions by Agent Pierce. Isabel telepathically contacts Max, who leaves her clues to his location. Michael, Isabel and Tess then set out on a rescue mission leaving Alex, Liz and Maria behind. To be continued...
22	22	"Destiny"	Patrick Norris	Story by : Thania St. John; Teleplay by : Toni Graphia & Jason Katims	May 15, 2000	1ADA21	3.81
After escaping from Pierce, the aliens save Nasedo and when Michael kills Pierce, Nasedo takes Pierce's place to help the aliens. Max figures out how to use the devices and release a message from Max and Isabel's real mother - she says Max is their leader and Tess is his young bride and that Michael is second in command and he is Isabel's fiancé.

=== Season 2 (2000–01) ===
No. overall	No. in season	Title	Directed by	Written by	Original release date	Prod. code	Viewers (millions)
23	1	"Skin and Bones"	James A. Contner	Jason Katims	October 2, 2000	2ADA01	4.12
In the opening episode of the second series. Max, Liz, Isabel and Maria must rescue Michael after he is arrested on suspicion of murder; Liz takes a job with a congresswoman who has a hidden agenda.
24	2	"Ask Not"	Bruce Seth Green	Ronald D. Moore	October 9, 2000	2ADA02	4.32
Brody Davis, the mysterious new curator at the UFO Museum has the group on edge, and Michael and Isabel plotting his demise.
25	3	"Surprise"	Frederick King Keller	Toni Graphia	October 16, 2000	2ADA03	4.78
Isabel is deeply moved when Max throws her a surprise birthday party, but she grows troubled after seeing visions of a bound and gagged Tess. Meanwhile, Alex does an interesting cop striptease for Isabel; Congresswoman Whitaker is revealed as Nasedo's killer and as a Skin. Isabel also learns some information about her past life on Antar.
26	4	"Summer of '47"	Patrick Norris	Gretchen J. Berg & Aaron Harberts	October 23, 2000	2ADA04	5.01
Michael discovers the hidden history behind the 1947 crash when interviewing a World War II survivor for a school project. The story unfolds with familiar faces portraying people in 1947.
27	5	"The End of the World"	Bill L. Norton	Jason Katims	October 30, 2000	2ADA05	4.87
An older Max travels from 2014 to tell Liz that their relationship will imperil his planet and together they devise a plan to change the future: by making present Max fall out of love with Liz. Not an easy task until Liz tricks Max into believing she slept with Kyle.
28	6	"Harvest"	Paul Shapiro	Fred Golan	November 6, 2000	2ADA06	4.67
After the death of Congresswoman Whitaker, Max and the gang visit her hometown, Copper Summit, Arizona, where they find themselves trapped in enemy territory when they learn the entire population are Skins.
29	7	"Wipeout!"	Michael Lange	Gretchen J. Berg & Aaron Harberts	November 13, 2000	2ADA07	4.85
The Skins make all the humans in Roswell, New Mexico disappear, turning it into a ghost town. Maria and Liz manage to slip through the cracks and don't disappear with the rest of the humans because they were out of town at the time. Upon returning to Roswell, they realize everyone is gone and freak out. When they get to the Crashdown, they meet up with the four aliens and together they try to figure out who is behind the disappearances. The Skins assault ends with the death of one of the aliens, Courtney. Fortunately Tess uses her mind blowing powers and destroys all the other Skins or so it seems until Max and Tess spot a boy resembling Nicholas on a scooter at the end of the episode.
30	8	"Meet the Dupes"	James A. Contner	Toni Graphia	November 20, 2000	2ADA08	4.39
Duplicate versions of Michael, Isabel, and Tess come to Roswell after killing their king Zan, to urge Max to attend an important interstellar summit in New York City, but they have their own agenda; Max also discovers Isabel was Vilandra in their past lives, causing friction between him and Isabel; Ava stays behind in Roswell. To be continued...
31	9	"Max in the City"	Patrick Norris	Ronald D. Moore	November 27, 2000	2ADA09	4.14
Max and Tess depart for the interstellar summit in New York City with Rath and Lonnie, Michael and Isabel's duplicates, who both harbor a secret agenda for their future king and an alliance with Nicholas, the Skin. Ava reveals to Liz that Rath & Lonnie murdered Zan. Tess is kidnapped by the dupes after Max learns of their true intentions. When Max finally finds Tess she reveals that they tried to read her mind to find the Granolith but she resisted. She then says that they're gone -- but did they die or are they still out there? Ava says goodbye to Liz and leaves Roswell.
32	10	"A Roswell Christmas Carol"	Patrick Norris	Jason Katims	December 18, 2000	2ADA11	4.23
Max witnesses a tragedy and is haunted by the ghost of a man he could have saved, leaving him overwhelmed with guilt and questioning his healing abilities. Isabel aka the Christmas Nazi (dubbed by Michael) tried to brighten up the holiday season and Tess tries to become a part of the Valenti family. She and Kyle grow closer and Amy Deluca comes to Christmas dinner at the Valenti house. In order to set things right again, Liz gives Max the idea to heal Brody's dying daughter Sydney. After discussing it with the other aliens, he learns Michael thinks it is too much of a risk. Max decides to go through with it anyway with the support of the others. He and Michael drive to the hospital and after healing Sydney he can't bring himself to turn away from the other terminally ill children so he heals all of them and leaves just in time to avoid getting caught.
33	11	"To Serve and Protect"	Jefery Levy	Breen Frazier	January 22, 2001	2ADA10	3.73
When Isabel develops a psychic connection to a girl who has been buried alive, she races to find the teenager before it's too late. Meanwhile the FBI comes to town and starts asking questions concerning Valenti and his involvement with Max and Isabel. Kyle develops the notion that he is 'changing' because Max saved his life, and fears he isn't ready for the change. Liz's feelings for Max are intensifying and she claims she is obsessed and has him on her brain 24/7. Sean, Maria's older cousin, gets out of juvie and comes to town to stay with Amy and Maria. He sees Maria and Liz in the Crashdown and makes a flirtatious comment about Liz being all grown up. Isabel goes on a date with Grant and gets another flash from the missing girl.
34	12	"We Are Family"	David Grossman	Gretchen J. Berg & Aaron Harberts	January 29, 2001	2ADA12	4.09
Sheriff Valenti is suspended from the force after refusing to answer the FBI's questions about Max and Isabel, but he soon finds himself right back in the thick of things when Laurie DuPree shows up at his house claiming to be chased by aliens.
35	13	"Disturbing Behavior"	James Whitmore, Jr.	Ronald D. Moore	February 5, 2001	2ADA13	4.18
Michael and Maria flee from Roswell after helping Laurie DuPree escape from the police, and Max learns that a deadly parasite was released into Earth's atmosphere when their ship crashed 50 years ago. To be continued...
36	14	"How the Other Half Lives"	Paul Shapiro	Story by : Gretchen J. Berg & Aaron Harberts & Breen Frazier; Teleplay by : Jason Katims & Ronald D. Moore	February 19, 2001	2ADA14	3.27
Max tries to stop Alex and Kyle from being buried alive in a cave filled with glowing blue crystals; Isabel is kidnapped by Grant Sorenson possessed by the alien parasite queen; Michael is shot while trying to protect Laurie..
37	15	"Viva Las Vegas"	Bruce Seth Green	Gretchen J. Berg & Aaron Harberts	February 26, 2001	2ADA15	3.74
When the gang makes a spur-of-the-moment trip to Las Vegas, in order to spend the DuPree money, the event-filled excursion ends in a face off between Max and Michael over leadership; Tess and Liz can't pass for being over-21-year-olds; Maria recruits Alex to help her audition for a role that ends up to be for a stripper; Isabel meets a man.
38	16	"Heart of Mine"	Lawrence Trilling	Jason Katims	April 16, 2001	2ADA17	4.11
The onset of junior prom stirs up emotional tumult as Liz tempts fate by asking Max to be her date, Isabel decides Alex is the man she's been searching for, and Michael tells Maria he won't take her to prom.
39	17	"Cry Your Name"	Allan Kroeker	Ronald D. Moore	April 23, 2001	2ADA18	3.83
Jim Valenti informs the kids that Alex was killed in a suspicious car accident. When the investigation into the car accident leads Valenti and Max to believe that Alex committed suicide, Liz refuses to believe it and begins her own investigation.
40	18	"It's Too Late and It's Too Bad"	Patrick Norris	Gretchen J. Berg & Aaron Harberts	April 30, 2001	2ADA19	4.00
A startling breakthrough leads to a renewed connection for two of the gang. Differing reactions to a life shattering event creates tension among the gang, resulting in heartfelt revelations, hidden insecurities and thoughts of leaving Roswell. Meanwhile, Liz enlists Sean in her continuing quest for answers into the death of Alex.
41	19	"Baby, It's You"	Rodney Charters	Lisa Klink	May 7, 2001	2ADA20	4.54
Max is hit with a one-two punch after he discovers that not only is Tess pregnant with his son, but that the baby cannot survive unless they return to their home planet. Liz, Maria, and Michael work together to unravel the mysterious double life of Alex. Isabel and Kyle explore her powers as they play pranks on Max, and Kyle dreamwalks with a Playmate.
42	20	"Off the Menu"	Patrick Norris	Russel Friend & Garrett Lerner	May 14, 2001	2ADA16	3.58
Brody Davis, his mind frazzled from an electric shock, holds several members of the gang hostage, when he begins to remember what happened when he was abducted, such as the New York City interstellar summit and the fact that Max is an alien. Max must use his healing abilities to fix Brody's mind so that he doesn't remember the alien mind that inhabits him. Tess must mindwarp Amy DeLuca into not remembering that Brody held them hostage.
43	21	"The Departure"	Patrick Norris	Jason Katims	May 21, 2001	2ADA21	4.55
Max, Isabel, Michael, and Tess struggle with goodbyes on what they believe to be their last night on Earth before they travel back to their home planet. In the final hours, Max frantically searches for the killer that is still out there and threatens the lives of everyone they love.

=== Season 3 (2001–02) ===
No. overall	No. in season	Title	Directed by	Written by	Original release date	Prod. code	Viewers (millions)
44	1	"Busted"	Allan Kroeker	Jason Katims	October 9, 2001	3ADA01	3.87
In the opening episode of the concluding series of the program. Max and Liz are detained and jailed for holding up a convenience store. Meanwhile, Isabel has a secret affair with a handsome attorney, and Michael tries to straighten out his life.
45	2	"Michael, the Guys and the Great Snapple Caper"	Paul Shapiro	Ronald D. Moore	October 16, 2001	3ADA02	3.03
Michael works as a security guard, but when he tries to loosen up his co-workers, he causes more harm than good. Meanwhile, Max and Liz continue to see each other despite her parents' wishes.
46	3	"Significant Others"	Patrick Norris	David Simkins	October 23, 2001	3ADA03	3.0
With Alex's ghost as her guide, Isabel must finally confront her fears about love and her conflicted feelings for Jesse. Meanwhile, Maria happily discovers a whole new, human part of Michael in, of all places, a bowling alley, and Liz and Max struggle to remain together despite her father's insistent disapproval.
47	4	"Secrets and Lies"	Jonathan Frakes	Russel Friend & Garrett Lerner	October 30, 2001	3ADA04	3.12
Max travels to Hollywood while investigating a murder he believes was committed by an alien. He discovers a link to a Paramount science fiction show called "They Are Among Us" and when he goes to the Paramount lot to investigate he ends up auditioning for the part of an alien on an episode of "Enterprise" directed by Star Trek alum, Jonathan Frakes. Meanwhile, back in Roswell, Isabel and Jesse struggle over how to reveal their engagement to their families. To be continued...
48	5	"Control"	Bill L. Norton	Gretchen J. Berg & Aaron Harberts	November 6, 2001	3ADA05	2.74
Max, with the help of Kal Langley, undertakes a dangerous journey as he seeks to learn of the fate of Tess and his son. Meanwhile, back in Roswell, Isabel and Jesse must face the negative reactions of their parents and friends to their impending marriage.
49	6	"To Have and to Hold"	Frederick King Keller	Ronald D. Moore	November 13, 2001	3ADA06	2.9
Right before her wedding, Isabel is torn with doubt when she has erotic dreams of her former alien lover, Kivar. Meanwhile, a reluctant Max agrees to serve as Jesse's best man, while attempting to investigate him at the bachelor party.
50	7	"Interruptus"	Bruce Seth Green	David Simkins	November 20, 2001	3ADA07	2.87
After their idyllic wedding, Isabel and Jesse are stalked on their honeymoon by her alien lover Kivar who plots to take her back to their home planet. Learning of this, Max and Michael arrive intent on destroying the alien. Meanwhile, Liz and Maria discover that Philip has begun a secret investigation of Max, including the disappearance of Tess, and he's embroiling Liz's dad into the whole thing.
51	8	"Behind the Music"	Jonathan Frakes	Russel Friend & Garrett Lerner	November 27, 2001	3ADA08	3.10
When an old love visits Maria her passion for music resurfaces, which jeopardizes her relationship with Michael. Meanwhile, while Max's father is still trying to put together all the pieces of his investigation, Isabel joins Max in the quest to stop him.
52	9	"Samuel Rising"	Patrick Norris	Jason Katims	December 18, 2001	3ADA09	2.89
When Max is fascinated by an intriguing autistic child he wonders if his own lost child is attempting to reach out to him. Meanwhile, Michael plays Santa to Maria and Liz's elves at a charity event. Isabel and Jesse share their first holiday together as husband and wife.
53	10	"A Tale of Two Parties"	Allan Kroeker	Laura Burns & Melinda Metz	January 1, 2002	3ADA10	2.29
In an attempt to find Roswell's legendary New Year's Rave, Max and Maria join forces together. Meanwhile, Liz connects with her father and Isabel helps Kyle find the perfect date for New Year's.
54	11	"I Married an Alien"	Patrick Norris	Ronald D. Moore	January 29, 2002	3ADA11	3.52
When a journalist friend of Jesse's comes to Roswell, Isabel discovers he's investigating her, Max, and Michael, after he witnesses Michael using his powers. Meanwhile, Isabel fantasizes about what her life would be like if Jesse knew her alien secret through the device of a 1960s sitcom a la "Bewitched".
55	12	"Ch-Ch-Changes"	Paul Shapiro	Gretchen J. Berg & Aaron Harberts	February 5, 2002	3ADA12	2.99
When Liz begins to undergo some strange, alien-like changes to her body, she decides she needs to get as far from Max as she can. In order to separate from him she must leave Roswell to go to boarding school in Vermont. Meanwhile, Maria gets offered a recording contract in New York, but she isn't sure she likes what the record label people are doing to her music to make it "popular".
56	13	"Panacea"	Rodney Charters	Russel Friend & Garrett Lerner	February 12, 2002	3ADA13	2.7
Michael uncovers a conspiracy at Metachem, when a guard is killed on duty. Michael enlists the aid of Max and Isabel when the investigation takes an alien turn. Meanwhile, Liz has entered boarding school in Vermont and tries to start a new life, and Maria, disillusioned by New York, goes to visit Liz in Vermont.
57	14	"Chant Down Babylon"	Lawrence Trilling	Ronald D. Moore	February 26, 2002	3ADA14	2.95
Michael, Jesse, and Valenti call on a discredited doctor to help the wounded Isabel. Also, Clayton Wheeler undergoes an amazing transformation and soon finds himself drawn to Liz. Jesse quizzes Michael about Isabel's alien roots.
58	15	"Who Died and Made You King?"	Peter B. Ellis	Gretchen J. Berg & Aaron Harberts	April 23, 2002	3ADA15	2.97
When the gang attempts to return to their normal lives, they soon find that their lives have gotten a lot more complicated, which includes Jesse attempting to come to terms with his newfound knowledge. Matters are complicated when he finds himself under FBI scrutiny, and Max's "death" creates a unique situation within the alien authority structure, resulting in a new king - Michael.
59	16	"Crash"	Patrick Norris	David Simkins	April 30, 2002	3ADA16	3.11
Michael witnesses a fatal crash between a fighter jet and an alien vessel, and embarks on his own investigation leading to the recovery of an artifact. Meanwhile, Isabel spends the day with her mother, who's harboring a secret agenda and is working with her husband to discover Max and Isabel's secret, which leads to a shocking revelation.
60	17	"Four Aliens and a Baby"	William Sadler	Russel Friend & Garrett Lerner	May 7, 2002	3ADA17	2.81
Max's quest to find his son ends with the return of Tess and the baby, and the gang find themselves in danger again while trying to protect the child. Meanwhile, Jesse encourages Isabel to reveal her true origins to her parents, and the elder Evanses provide a way to ensure their grandchild's safety.
61	18	"Graduation"	Allison Liddi-Brown	Jason Katims & Ronald D. Moore	May 14, 2002	3ADA18	2.85
In the series finale, as their high school graduation approaches, the Roswell gang must come to terms with their expectations for the future, while joining together to thwart the FBI when they discover that several members of the group are under surveillance. Meanwhile, Liz begins exhibiting even more alien-like powers, that cause her to see visions of their future - including their deaths.
