= Liz Parker =

- Roswell character
- Liz Parker as portrayed by Shiri Appleby
- First appearance: "Pilot" (episode 1.01)
- Last appearance: "Graduation" (episode 3.18)
- Created by: Character; Melinda Metz; Developed for Television; Jason Katims
- Portrayed by: Shiri Appleby (1999 series); Jeanine Mason (2019 series)

In-universe information
- Full name: Elizabeth Parker Evans
- Nicknames: Liz (by everyone); Lizzy, Beth
- Species: Human
- Gender: Female
- Occupation: High school student (at Roswell High; graduated); Waitress
- Family: Jeffrey "Jeff" Parker (father); Nancy Parker (mother); Zan (biological step-son; adopted by another family)
- Spouses: Maxwell "Max" Evans (husband)
- Abilities: Premonitions, Telekinesis, Pyrokinesis, Psychic power, Healing, and Molecular combustion

Elizabeth Parker is a fictional character and the protagonist of the Roswell High book series and Roswell television series that ran from 1999 to 2002. The character was portrayed by Shiri Appleby. In the CW reboot, Liz is of Mexican descent therefore having the surname Ortecho (like in the original books that preceded both TV series) and is played by Jeanine Mason. In the series her name is Liz Ortecho.

Liz is considered to be the protagonist of the series, along with Max Evans. Liz is the main narrator throughout the three seasons and she has been described as the "heart and soul" of the show. She made her first appearance in the Roswell pilot episode and remained a core character until the series finale.

== Fictional character summary ==
- Note: This article is about Liz Parker as the television character of Roswell only. Although the two versions are similar the character of the original books is considered an alternative universe version.

Liz Parker attends Roswell High School, where her favorite subject is science. Her best friends are Alex Whitman and Maria DeLuca. At the beginning of the series, she breaks up with boyfriend Kyle Valenti and engages in a relationship with alien-human hybrid Max Evans, which serves as the crux of the television series.

=== Characteristics ===
Liz Parker is portrayed as a typical girl next door, at least from the outside. She is beautiful though she doesn't really realize it. She is smart and very direct about her opinions, sensible, confident and levelheaded. Her home was above the diner her family owns, the Crashdown Café, and until the last episode, she worked there as a waitress after school. She did well in school, especially in science that had been her passion since she was a child. Her dream was to go into molecular biology at Harvard university. However, after the events in the season three finale, Liz's whereabouts are unknown.

Liz is a complex character; very sweet and kind overall, yet strong and determined. Control is something very important for her: with it, she can get facts and answers and this makes her feel more safe about herself, those she loves, and life in general. However, her real nature isn't really so controlled. When Max saves her life and she falls in love with him, everything in her life changes; Max is the living proof that people cannot control everything and even science doesn't have all the answers. She understands this, and realizes that she has to follow her heart and live in the moment, because no matter how people try, they can't control everything and they can't choose with whom they fall in love.

However, in the second season Liz becomes a character who is prone to extreme illogical behavior, often engaging in unreasonable accusatory behavior and mixed messages to others in the Roswell group. The second season is perhaps the worst for Liz as a character, and many audiences find the season 2 Liz far behind the sweet girl of the first season and the confident and free Liz of season 3.

Liz emerges as the "brain" among the group. She is the one who continuously gets the very core point of their problems and is able to find a solution most of the time - especially if the problem is science related. However, her determination and selfless spirit mixed with her sometimes controlling nature can also be a character flaw when it leads her into making decisions where she takes too much of the responsibility. This is also a characteristic that she shares with Max Evans.

It is stated that she loves White Roses in the season 2 episode, End of the World.

=== Relationship with Max Evans ===
The important premise and core plot of the show is Liz's relationship with the character Max Evans. The Co-executive producer of the series Ronald D. Moore, along with Jason Katims, stated more than once that Max and Liz represented the heart and soul of the series.

"Heart and Soul of Roswell, I think that Jason (Katims) would share this opinion, has always been the relationship between Max and Liz. That's where the plot begins. He saved her life and he exposes himself at the same time. The love between those two characters is fundamental to the show's success."

— Ron Moore, co-executive producer

Max has been in love with Liz since the first time he saw her at school, when he was just eight years old (shortly after emerging from the pod). However, he kept himself distanced from her, primarily because of his concerns about being an alien and her being a human, so Liz did not know about his feelings and did not suspect that her laboratory partner had been secretly in love with her. This secret ends only in the pilot episode when she gets shot at the Crashdown Cafe and he saves her life, risking everything for her and starting the lead plot of the show.

Liz does love Max from the first time she gets the chance to see his soul and to really know him. This happens when Max does give her the chance to connect with him through a reversed connection created by his alien powers in order to make them even since the same happened when he healed her and he got flashes from her about her life and her inner feelings. In that moment, Liz can see his thoughts, especially about her, and she realizes that he's lonely, he loves her and he does not want to hurt people, so she starts to help him and his friends, from the beginning making the decision to renounce her normality.

She shares a deep, mysterious connection with him. It is with her involuntary help that he starts to find more clues about his origins. Also, Liz is able to feel whether Max is in danger or hurt (in the third season she feels when he dies), and they save each other's lives more than once. For this powerful connection between them and their deep and natural affinity and compatibility, they are considered soulmates by both the characters of the story and the creators of the series.

"The Max-Liz connection works so well, as is so popular with "Roswell"'s fans, because, in Moore's opinion, "It's very romantic in the classic sense of the word. Max is a young man from another planet, with secrets. He saved her life in the first episode, and they became soulmates across time and space. It's a classic set-up. Beyond that, the appeal of their relationship has a great deal to do with the chemistry between Shiri Appleby and Jason Behr."

— Ron Moore, co-executive producer from Dec Starlog

==== Recurring Themes ====
Due to the nature of their relationship and the obvious difference between an alien boy and a human girl, Max and Liz's relationship is another modern example of forbidden lovers, with many references to Romeo and Juliet through the series by both the characters and the writers.

Most notable examples are when Maria De Luca called them "Romeo and Juliet against the world", or when Liz herself used the tragedy of Romeo and Juliet into her own tragic speech in the episode "The End of the World" from season two. The producers and writers of the series were not unaware of the parallelism either.

"The episodes that I have really found have worked in that way are the pilot episode, which works really well because that’s really, to me, Romeo and Juliet. It’s really about two people meeting and falling in love, but not being able to be together, and I think it grabs you in that way."

— Jason Katims executive producer and creator,

=== Effect of Max's powers on Liz ===
After Max Evans heals her in the pilot, he converts her to the alien side and she changes. At the end of the show, she is still human, but has developed some alien powers.

In the episode "Four Aliens and A Baby", Liz blasts Tess Harding twice, using a green energy that exited from her hands. In "Graduation", she starts to see flashes about the future after touching people. She sees a customer of the Crashdown Café in danger and she and Max save her. While she is making out with Max she gets a flash of Max, herself, Michael and Isabel being killed by someone. Thanks to this power, they flee Roswell at the end of the series, before the FBI can kill them.

In the season two episode "Max in the City", viewers can see her "change" start to develop when she saves Max's life by projecting her image from Roswell to New York with Isabel's help.

== Fictional biography ==
=== Season One ===
In the pilot, while Liz is working at her parents' restaurant, Crashdown Cafe, she is shot accidentally by two men who are having an argument. When Max saves her life by healing her gunshot wound, her life is changed forever. He puts his hand over her wound and miraculously makes the wound and bullet disappear. Realizing that there is something incredibly amazing about Max, she decides to investigate. She takes Max's pencil, which Max had been chewing on, places the saliva collected from the pencil tip on a slide, and examines the slide through a microscope. She can see that his cells are not human. When she confronts Max about everything that had happened to her and his alien cells, Max confesses to her that he is an alien that had been on the alien craft that crashed in Roswell in 1947.

With growing suspicion coming from the local sheriff, Jim Valenti, Liz devises a plan to throw him off Max's scent. She is successful and Valenti, though still cautious and wary of Max, lets him go. After this incident, she starts developing deep feelings for Max, despite her current relationship with the sheriff's son Kyle Valenti. For a while she lies to her friends Alex and Maria, but eventually Maria confronts Liz about what is going on. Liz eventually relents to Maria's questions and tells her all she knows about Max, Isabel and Michael. Kyle grows jealous of the growing relationship between her and Max, and a group of his friends beat up Max. She breaks up with Kyle in response to this, causing a rift between them. However, her relationship with Max grows very strong and she finds herself falling in love with him. An incident involving Michael Guerin, however, scares Max away, and he realizes that doesn't want to hurt Liz in any way. He is an alien and doesn't know what is going to happen to him or who might come after him; he wants her to be safe.

However, Liz and Max end up falling in love. Max, as an alien, had a profound effect on her, and when they kiss Liz gets images of Max's past, which help Max, Michael and Isabel discover an Alien Orb. This doesn't last long, as Tess Harding arrives in Roswell and begins to influence Max in a strange way. Liz sees Max and Tess kiss and is heartbroken, but after hearing Max out she and the others start to believe that Tess could be the fourth alien named Nasedo using a female appearance and she's influencing Max's thoughts by making him hallucinate. She forgives him and with her help the group discovers that Tess is not Nasedo but another hybrid like Max, Michael and Isabel and her unique power is to create mindwarps.

Feeling that Liz is a threat to his plans, the real Nasedo shapeshifts into Max and takes her. When she kisses him, she realizes he is not Max because she has visions of his past. Max, worried about Liz and what Nasedo might do, goes after them. Maria and Alex tell Sheriff Valenti that they are worried because Liz is with Max and she called claiming that she was scared because Max was acting weird. This was done in order to try to find Liz faster. They are found in a theme park. In the house of mirrors, Max is grabbed by the FBI and Nasedo grabs Liz. She kisses him and again realizes that he is Nasedo when she gets images from his past. She is deeply heartbroken when Max is abducted by the FBI and has to tell the news to Michael and Isabel. With the help of Nasedo, the gang saves Max from the FBI.

In the season one finale, "Destiny", she goes with Max to the alien pod chamber in the rock formation that was disguised as the alien craft that crashed. Max, Michael, Isabel and Tess' destiny is revealed when they use the alien orbs to contact Max and Isabel's (alien) mother. Max, Michael, Isabel and Tess are the Royal Four of their home planet Antar. They were all killed in their former lives by their enemy Kivar. During their deaths, their alien DNA was mixed with human DNA and sent to earth so their race could preserve the Royal Four in order for them to return someday to rule again. In their former lives, Max was Zan, the king of Antar. Tess (Ava in a former life) was Zan's wife, Isabel (Vilandra) was Zan's sister and her husband was Michael (Rath), Zan's second in command. After realizing that Max and Tess are destined to be together and the importance of Max to his race, Liz decides to let Max go in order for him to fulfill his destiny, because she now sees he is destined to be with Tess, no matter how much they love each other. As she leaves the cave, Max follows her but Michael stops him, saying, "You have to let her go".

=== Season Two ===
Season two begins with Liz returning from a summer away from Roswell. She has a new job as an intern for Congresswoman Whitaker, who later turns out to be a Skin, an enemy of the hybrids. While Liz continues to have strong feelings for Max, she stands by her decision that their relationship stands in the way of his destiny. Max, on the other hand, tries everything he can to be with her.

In the episode "The End of the World", Liz is asked by a future version of Max to help him get the modern-day Max to fall out of love with her. Future Max claims that if they don't do this, the world will end and they will all die. Shocked, she only accepts it when Future Max predicts that Max will turn up with a Mariachi band and sing a love song for her. When this transpires she agrees to help Future Max. He goes on to tell her the kind of future present-day Max and she will have if they do not succeed. He tells her that after she and Max had sex for the first time, it cemented their relationship and they were never apart again. This upset Tess and she left Roswell. Max and Liz were married in Las Vegas when they were 19 and were together until the end of the world came because when Max's enemies came to earth, Max, Michael, and Isabel were not strong enough in their powers without Tess. So they have to get Tess and Max together to save everyone and rewrite the future. She tries to get Tess to help by attracting Max towards her but it fails when Max catches Liz watching. Liz at the end has to resort to making Max think that she had sex with Kyle. This succeeds; as Max walks to the window, he sees Liz talking with Kyle in bed, which breaks Max's heart. Liz has one last dance to her future wedding song, "I Shall Believe" by Sheryl Crow, with the Future Max, but he disappears because the future has been changed and he no longer exists.

Liz attracts the attention of Maria's cousin, and they have a few dates, but nothing serious comes out of it., She is left devastated when she hears that Alex has died in a car crash. She visits the destroyed car that Alex was driving and finds a picture of Alex and a girl he met in Sweden, but his head was cut off in the picture. This leads her to suspect that Alex was murdered, and she begins to try to find the supposed truth by asking the last person who saw him what Alex had said to him. At the funeral gathering in Alex's home, she accuses an alien of killing Alex. This deeply offends Max and the others, more so Isabel who had grown close to Alex. This creates a "them vs. us" scenario and the whole future of the formerly tight group looks bleak. She decides to go to Sweden to find the people with whom Alex was staying, but she receives a call from the Swedish government claiming that the building Alex was standing in front of in the photo, supposedly taken in Sweden, hasn't existed in several years. She comes to the conclusion that Alex never went to Sweden. Her investigations lead her, Maria, and Michael to Las Cruses University. They discover that Alex had been working there on a translation program for the alien book that was given to Max and the others. Liz sees the girl with Alex in the photo at a Nelly Furtado concert but loses her in the crowd.

Liz returns to Roswell, and she finds out that Tess is pregnant with Max's child, and that he has to leave Earth and go back to Antar. He has to do this because the baby is dying, as he can't survive in the Earth's environment. Max also asks her about the girl at Las Cruses. Wanting to know why he is asking, she learns that Max suspects the girl to be an alien and that he has to kill her to stop her from being a threat. She asks whether she could go with him to witness it, and he agrees, but as Max was about to commit the act, Liz realizes that the girl is human; she saves the girl from the fire that Max has caused. They head home confused because they do not know who killed Alex and it now looks like they will never know. Max tells Liz and that he has to go back to Antar with Tess, Isabel and Michael because the baby is dying. Liz is heartbroken and angry at the same time at the thought that Max is leaving her. Max discovers the truth about Kyle when he asks Liz if she really had sex with Kyle and she tells him no. Upon realizing this he sees the huge mistake he has made with Tess. He wishes he could go back because he has always loved Liz, despite being with Tess. Liz asks him if he loves Tess and Max says, "Not like I love you". What he felt for Tess was only care. He wants things to be different, but he feels that his duty is to his son, and thus has no other choice than to save him. Max and Liz share a passionate kiss. When Liz doesn't have a vision, Max breaks down in tears. He realizes that their futures did not intersect. If he goes with his son, he will never see her again. Liz goes to Maria's cousin, Sean, and declares that Max has broken her heart, but she realizes that it isn't Sean's fault and she can't use him as Max's replacement.

During the day the aliens have planned to leave, Liz, Maria, Sean and Kyle are at the Crashdown Café talking. Maria and Liz notice that Kyle keeps tapping the table in a peculiar sort of way. When they mentioned this, he says that he has no control over it and doesn't even know he's doing it. They go to Maria's house and find her mom remembering about a hostage situation in which they had been. Tess uses an alien power to blank her memory. They confront Maria's mother and she appears fine and seems to forget again. But she then starts to tap the same way that Kyle had done earlier in the day. Liz remembers that Alex used to tap his bass guitar the same way, and she realizes that this isn't a coincidence. They confront Kyle and tell him to look around the room to see whether anything will jerk his memory. When he looks in the mirror, he remembers that Tess killed Alex and that he had been mindwarped by Tess to carry Alex's dead body to the car. Liz and Maria go to the pod chamber just as Max, Michael, Isabel and Tess are about to leave the planet with the granolith. At the last minute, Michael decides he cannot leave Earth because this is his home and he is in love with Maria and can't leave her. As Michael leaves the pod chamber, the door opens and Liz and Maria tell Michael that Tess killed Alex. Max confronts Tess and realizes that it was all a setup and that the baby was a part of the plan. Kivar wasn't Tess and Nasedo's enemy. The truth is that 40 years before, Nasedo had made a deal with Kivar: go home to Antar, delivering Max and his friends to him (that would have killed them) and carry Max's heir in the process.

Angry, Max wants to kill her but then realizes that she is carrying his son so he lets her go in order to save the baby. He regroups with Liz and the others on the mountainside. Max then tells Liz that he was wrong about many things but not about her, that he loves her, and will always love her. They embrace and the season ends with Max saying that he must save his son.

=== Season Three ===
At the start of season three, viewers can only see flashes of some moments of the summer when Liz and Max reconcile in order to understand what happened after departure and what brought them to "busted" and then together again. They arrange to go out on a date, a way to start things over from the beginning. They are on their date when Max decides to go skinny dipping. As Liz is about to join him, Max gets a vision from his son and begins to drown. Liz saves him. Max realizes that his son is in trouble. They search for a ship that they believe is held in a storage facility in the basement of a convenience store in Utah. Liz and Max come up with a plan to hold up the store and when Liz is holding the shop clerk hostage, Max will go down and check to see whether the ship is there. Max gives Liz a gun and when they hold up the convenience store, Max finds that there is a ship and it is still working, but his time is cut short as the police arrive. They try to escape, but they fail. They are caught after a police chase, and both are arrested and held in the local jail. Max is let out after the police find that nothing was taken from the shop. They couldn't find the weapon, but due to a witness seeing Liz with the gun, Liz is kept in jail.

She gets saved by Max, as he is able to bribe the FBI into pulling some strings and getting the case dropped. However, Liz's panic-stricken father forbids her to see Max, and bans Max from coming into the Crashdown Café. She defiantly breaks the rule, and upsets her father on numerous occasions. The reason that her father bans Max is that her father was a wild teenager, and his high school sweetheart died in a car crash because of his drunk driving. Realizing this after her mother tells her, Liz's attitude towards him changes and they begin to reconcile their differences.

Even if Tess' fiasco still did hurt her, Liz takes responsibility for her own mistakes and realizes it wasn't only Max's fault things went that way. She and Max love each other and they don't want to give up on their love no matter what. She understands that Max does need her so she stands by him trying to help him, putting herself in danger, finding and saving a baby. Thinking about Max's serious problem, she hides her inner feelings for most of the season, giving him her support, but then she begins to suffer some side effects towards Max's touch. Whenever Max touches her, a spark appears on her body and causes her pain. This scares her, as she realizes that when Max healed her in the pilot episode, saving her life, he changed her and they don't know whether she is safe or not. Max is scared for her; he wants to contact the FBI, the same people who tortured him in the end of season one, in order to find a way to keep her safe and know what is happening to her. He realizes that what happened with Tess is still hurting Liz and they need to talk about it. But Liz realizes that she needs a little time alone away from Roswell and Max in order to find her balance again and give their love another chance. She decides that she wants to leave Roswell temporarily, so that she can get better and understand what is happening to her, not only the alien aspect but the confusion about her life. Max respects her decision, waiting for her in Roswell. She goes to an all-girl boarding school to start fresh.

It is not long before Liz's life in Roswell catches up with her. While sleeping she suddenly wakes up realizing that Max has died. She is heartbroken and decides to drown her sorrows with alcohol. While drunk she sees Max (whose body has been taken over by an old millionaire named Clayton who wanted to kill her because Max's soul was still alive in him only for her and his memories about her that Clayton got), she tells Maria who doesn't believe her. But they are both in shock when Max (when his body was still taken over by the old millionaire) comes to kill Liz as she is all he thinks about. They are both falling from the top of a building when Max regains control and he saves Liz's life by putting a force field in her path to break her fall. But, realizing that Clayton would kill her, he doesn't let himself hit the ground; he sacrifices his life for her. When Liz wakes up she realizes that Max has died; there is no heartbeat and no breath from him, so she kisses him with a desperate goodbye. Believing Max to be still dead, Liz is shocked as he wakes up and appears to come back to life. They realize that Liz has saved Max's life making him come back with a kiss.

Back in Roswell, Max and Liz are shocked when Tess appears with Max's baby. Tess had to return because Kivar betrayed her, trying to kill the baby because he was fully human, as it was the human parts of Max and Tess that made him. Max discovers that the baby is fine and his sickness was another lie. The baby wasn't sick on Earth, this was just another mindwarp by Tess in order to force Max's return to Antar. She had crash-landed on Earth and slaughtered everyone around her ship at the air base. Tess and her son are now being hunted by the Army. Max and the others start a vote in order to decide whether they should deliver Tess to the FBI because it was her fault they were suddenly all in danger again. In the end, Liz's final vote is no because she never wants to be a killer like Tess and she can't deliver her to the FBI—that would have done to Tess what they did to Max in the end of season one.

In the night, Tess realizes that the only way to save her son is to destroy the base with all the proof and kill herself in the process. Amazed at how Liz didn't vote against her, Tess asks for Liz's help, trusting only her in the group. She understands her mistakes and she tells Liz that Max always loved only her and all the times that she and Max were together she always got flashes of Liz in his mind. Liz appreciates her sincerity and Tess asks Liz to not let the FBI study her like a laboratory animal.

After Tess' death, Max decides to give up his child for adoption so he can have a safe, normal life. The decision destroys Max's heart, but Liz comforts and supports him, letting him cry in her arms.

Later Liz realizes that she now has a power: to see the future. When she touches Max she has visions that she, Max, Isabel, and Michael are going to die. Michael says that Max, Liz and Isabel should leave Roswell separately because the FBI knows who they are and their life in Roswell has to be over. Maria is upset by this because she doesn't want to be left in Roswell alone without Michael or Liz. Max proposes to Liz, making the choice to be with her even if they have only 12 days. Liz says yes. They all attend their graduation and when they realize this is where they are supposed to die from one of Liz's flashes they all escape into the desert. Now Max, Liz, Michael, Maria, Isabel and Kyle decide to leave together because even though Maria and Kyle were not going to be killed, Kyle wants to be with his own kind when he develops his alien powers from Max's healing and Maria wants to be with Michael. They leave Roswell that night, and go together in a van, deciding to live life using their powers to do good deeds on the road. Liz sends her father her journal, continuing the truth about everything so he can understand why she left and finally know what has been going on in her life. Liz marries Max in a beautiful country church.

== Shiri Appleby about her character ==
During the time when the show aired, Shiri Appleby was interviewed many times about her character The actress originally auditioned for all the three female roles in the show (Liz, Maria, Isabel) before finally landing the part of teen heroine Liz Parker.

"Well, I actually auditioned for all three of the girl parts numerous times [panel laughter]"

— Shiri Appleby, Roswell Press Tour Transcript, July 1999

From the same interview she also explains what drew her to the story:

"I think what really drew me was the writing, It really spoke to me and it is written in a really realistic way, so for people my age, it’s easy to understand. And I got really lucky in working with a really good group of talented young people and so we’re able to work together and bounce ideas off of each other. I think that’s what really appealed me to the entire show."

— Shiri Appleby, Roswell Press Tour Transcript, July 1999

Appleby describes her character as both the innocent and strong-tempered woman that is a result of her evolution through the series.

"Liz is very interested in learning. She is very innocent, somewhat naive, but with the ability to read what is right or wrong. She has a big crush on this guy but she knows they can’t be together because of the circumstances, but she still hopes. She’s experiencing a whole lot of new things in her life, so it’s exciting to see how she deals with that."

— Shiri Appleby, XPOSÉ Magazine, year 2000

The actress is particularly proud that Liz has always stood by her convictions and she believes that her character can be a positive example for younger girls:

"A lot of younger girls, I feel like they look to Liz for guidance, because she's able to say no to a lot of things. That's a really uncommon thing for younger girls. The fact that she can take charge, stand up and voice an opinion, and not be insecure about other people's opinions, it's great. She's a fictional character that's standing up to a boy at points, and there's something to be said for that. That's probably one of the things I'm most proud of. When the show is finished, I'll be feeling good that that character had that stance. She doesn't like being taken advantage of"

— Shiri Appleby, Life Beyond Roswell

Regarding the character's relationship with Max Evans (Jason Behr ) and her chemistry with the actor, Shiri states that their chemistry was there since the first time they read a scene together

"While Jason and I are looking into each other's eyes I just think about the most pure love possible because their relationship is based strictly on the heart. What they share is what I someday hope to find."

— Shiri Appleby, Shiri Appleby, Fandemonium Q & A

"I felt like Jason Behr and I had such a unique chemistry. He just walked in and we started reading together, it was just there"

— Shiri Appleby, Lula Magazine Interview

When they asked her if the chemistry between her and Jason Behr worked she answered:

" Yes. They have always worked. I would not want to analyse because then it could disappear. It's like you started to analyse your first love and notice that feeling is gone. Everything started at that moment when we did get ready for our first filming and Jason arrived to place and watched me and said: "Hi! Nice to meet you!". Then it happened. We did have the chemistry right from the beginning. It surely tells something about our chemistry that people still likes to watch it after a two years."

— Shiri Appleby, Sensual Shiri Appleby: From shy student to actress
