= Kyle Valenti =

- Roswell character
- First appearance: "Pilot"
- Last appearance: "Graduation"
- Created by: Jason Katims
- Portrayed by: Nick Wechsler

In-universe information
- Family: Jim Valenti (father); James Valenti Sr. (grandfather)

Kyle Valenti is a fictional character created by Melinda Metz for the young adults book series Roswell High and adapted by Jason Katims for the 1999-2002 American science fiction television series Roswell. He was portrayed by actor Nick Wechsler in the television series. In the CW reboot, he's played by Michael Trevino.

== Fictional character summary ==
Narratively, Kyle is regularly used as comic relief in serious situations. He is portrayed with the most distinct, developed sense of humor of the group, despite also having a serious and caring side, shown to be very protective of those he cares about. Kyle's Buddhism is often used as joke fodder, with him often quoting philosophical texts to help in serious situations, to the exasperation of his father, Sheriff Jim Valenti, and friends.

Kyle is a sophomore and shown to have a big interest in sports. Although he is mostly shown as being a football star at fictional West Roswell High School, he is also shown to play basketball, and reveals in one episode that his true passion is baseball and he wants to play for the Houston Astros.

== Fictional biography ==
=== Season one ===
Kyle is initially portrayed as an antagonist, albeit a reasonably sympathetic one. He is introduced as a romantic acquaintance of protagonist Liz Parker. When Liz starts hanging around Max Evans and soon thereafter dumps Kyle, he becomes jealous of Max and begins a rivalry with him. This rivalry is fueled by Jim Valenti's obsession with Max. Jim Valenti warns Kyle to stay away from Max, as he may be dangerous. Although Kyle's feelings for Liz are only casual and he is soon able to get over them, he continues to find himself in tense conflict with Max.

At the end of season one, his father doesn't return home and an FBI agent is put in front of his house to keep a watch out. When Max comes to his house, knocks out the agent, and tells Kyle to stay put, Kyle is furious, thinking Max is putting his father in danger. He takes a gun from his father's cabinet and follows Max to the UFO Center, where he finds Agent Pierce, whom he believes to be the innocent Deputy Fisher, tied up. When Kyle frees him, Pierce takes his gun and attacks the others. In the ensuing melee, Kyle is accidentally shot by his own father. Kyle is found by his father and the others, and Max heals his wound, saving his life. Kyle is then entrusted with the secret that Max, his sister Isabel and his friend Michael Guerin are actually alien-human hybrids.

=== Season two ===
In the second season, because he is now "in on the secret", Kyle's character is expanded. It is revealed that, in order to come to peace with the presence of aliens in his life, he has found Buddhism. He wants nothing to do with the "little green men" and at first, does not join them in their main adventures, but finds one as a roommate when the orphaned Tess Harding moves in with him and his father. At first, Tess is annoying and hostile toward him, but the two soon become friends, with a heavy hinting of an attraction between the two. Tess is shown as filling the gap left in Kyle's family life because it is revealed that his mother left when he was six. Tess transforms the household from being just two guys into a real family again.

Kyle now has an understanding of those he was formerly pitted against and becomes friendly with the entire group, now considering Liz to be a good friend. He begins to resent Max again, however, when Sheriff Valenti loses his job protecting Max's secret. After this, Kyle is reluctant to help the group but does so anyway when they are searching for a cluster of toxic crystals that could spell doom for the world. He and Alex end up trapped in a cave with the crystals, and he forms a kinship with Alex Whitman, who helps him appreciate the presence of the aliens in their lives. Kyle then finds a way to kill the crystals and, upon escaping from the cave with Alex, exclaims that they just saved the world. After this encounter, Kyle once again grows friendly with the entire group, including Max, and becomes a substantial member of the alien clique. When the eight of them travel to Las Vegas together for a vacation, he is seen hanging out primarily with Alex.

Kyle ends up confronting his feelings for Tess and asking her to the dance. When Maria DeLuca asks him why they haven't hooked up yet, he says that he is, for some reason he can't put his finger on, resistant to do so. When a friend of his makes sexual comments about Tess, however, Kyle exclaims, "Don't you talk that way about my sister!", thus realizing that he truly feels a sibling love, not a romantic one, toward Tess.

Kyle is greatly affected by Alex's death in a car accident, as they were shown growing as friends earlier in the season, and he is one of the members of the group who supports Liz's theory that Alex was murdered.

At the end of season two, Kyle sees off Tess when she, Max, Michael and Isabel are forced to go back to their home planet, Antar. Shortly afterward Liz and Maria tell him that they think Tess has recently put a mindwarp on him, and, through concentration, Kyle is able to remember what was stolen from his mind: Tess killed Alex in front of him and made him carry his body into his car. Kyle, Liz and Maria manage to get to the pod chamber and stop the aliens from lifting off, telling them the truth. Max, Michael and Isabel exit the chamber as Tess returns to Antar, and Kyle stands with his five friends in the closing moment of the season, having gone from being an antagonist to a trusted member of the group.

=== Season three ===
With Tess gone and Alex dead, Kyle and Isabel are the only two members of the group of six who are not romantically involved with one another, and end up spending a lot of time together, becoming close friends. Kyle is the first to learn about her relationship with Jesse Ramirez and, unlike the others, supports her in it. After Isabel and Jesse's wedding, Kyle continues to be close friends with her and forms a friendship with Jesse as well. But while at a New Year's Eve party with Isabel, Kyle realizes that his feelings for Isabel are more than just platonic. An honorable man, he keeps these feelings inside, but is henceforth shown as deeply caring for Isabel, breaking down crying at her bedside when she is shot and almost killed.

When Liz begins manifesting powers as a result of Max healing her in the pilot episode, it becomes clear to Kyle that he too will probably gain some sort of alien powers in the future. In the series finale, "Graduation," when the rest of the group is forced to leave Roswell and live on the run, Kyle makes the decision to come with them, citing that he wants to be with his "own kind" when he starts to "snap, crackle and pop like tin foil". He says a heartfelt goodbye to his father before boarding a van with the others and leaving Roswell. He is last seen in the series with the other five main characters as they celebrate the wedding of Max and Liz and once again board the van, continuing on their road trip across America.

== Nick Wechsler about his character Kyle Valenti ==
Nick was interviewed just a few times about his character Kyle Valenti. During one of these interviews, he said

" It was like, `Do you want a job?’ It didn’t matter what the pitch was. I had to get something because I was doing nothing. It sounded all right to me. I initially read for the role that Colin (Hanks) got. Then they called me back for the role that I ended up getting. … I know it sounds kind of funny. OK, they’re aliens and they’re walking among us and they’re in high school. My good friends are always picking on me about it."

— Nick Wechsler, from "Five Questions With Nick Wechsler" by CHELSEA J. CARTER
