= Max Evans (Roswell) =

Fictional character

- Roswell character
- Jason Behr as Maxwell Evans
- First appearance: "Pilot" (episode 1.01)
- Last appearance: "Graduation" (episode 3.18)
- Created by: Character; Melinda Metz; Developed for Television; Jason Katims
- Portrayed by: Jason Behr

In-universe information
- Full name: Maxwell Evans
- Alias: Zan (previous life)
- Nicknames: Max (by everyone); Fearless Leader, Maximilian, Romeo, Young Max, Maxwell
- Species: Alien-human hybrid
- Gender: Male
- Title: King of Antar (previous life)
- Family: Philip Evans (adoptive father); Diane Evans (adoptive mother); Isabel Evans (sister); Darryl Morton (genetic template)
- Spouses: Elizabeth "Liz" Parker (wife); Ava (wife; previous life)
- Children: Zan (son, with Tess; adopted by another family)
- Abilities: Molecular manipulation, healing factor, force field generation

Maxwell "Max" Evans is a fictional character created by Melinda Metz for the young adults book series Roswell High and adapted by Jason Katims for the 1999-2002 American science fiction television series Roswell. He was portrayed by actor Jason Behr in the television series. In the CW reboot he's played by Nathan Parsons.

Max made his first appearance in the Roswell pilot episode and remained a core character throughout the three seasons of the show.

== Fictional character summary ==
In a previous existence, Max was Zan, king of the planet Antar. After Zan's death, his people used his DNA and the DNA of human donors to create two sets of alien/human hybrids or clones of him and the rest of the Royal Four of Antar. These include Isabel Evans (Vilandra, Zan's sister), Michael Guerin (Rath, Vilandra's betrothed husband and Zan's second-in command), and Tess Harding (Ava, Zan's bride). The clones were sent to Earth to hide them from their enemies especially Kivar who killed Zan & co back on Antar.

The craft carrying Max, Isabel, Michael, and Tess crashes in Roswell, New Mexico in 1947. In the series, the U.S. Army finds the alien pods and takes them to a base for study. The four are saved by an Air Force pilot and stashed in a new ship hidden in a rock formation. About 40 years pass before the clones emerge in 1989. Max, Isabel, and Michael leave the pod together, looking like human children about 6 years old. The three characters are blank slates with no memories of life on Antar, nor of the fourth hybrid, Tess (who is separately rescued by an Antarian with an agenda). Max and Isabel are found together by a couple of lawyers, the Evans, who adopt the two and make a loving and stable home for them. Michael hides when this happens and is later discovered and placed with an abusive foster father.

=== Characteristics ===
Max appears to be shy and introverted, though this is not his true disposition. Being a hybrid often forces him to hide his true self. Because he must conceal his true identity, Max is a complex character, very timid at times, yet passionate and carefree at others. Even before he knew that he was the clone of the king of Antar, Max emerged as the de facto leader among his friends.

Portrayed as the deep thinker of the group, Max sometimes is nevertheless shown spurred to bold action by his protective nature. This sometimes manifests as a character flaw, as his protective nature leads him to make conservative choices. However, fitting into the archetypal leader role, he always takes responsibility for his actions and choices, and is never beyond offering apologies to those he hurts. Max also stands out in the group because of his unique healing powers.

=== Powers and abilities ===
Max is capable of molecular manipulation and telekinesis, just like the rest of the hybrids, although he is not as well-practiced with either of these abilities as the others. His unique power is healing through physical contact, most notably used to save Liz Parker from a bullet wound in the first episode and a group of children with cancer in the second season. From the second season on, he is also able to produce a force field (visually resembling a thin wall of green gel) that can protect himself and others. Tess assisted him in developing this ability.

In the first season, he is also able to project the soul of Liz's grandmother (while she is in a coma) in order to give her the chance to say goodbye. However, this power is not used again in the show, and the character does not acknowledge this ability nor does the viewer understand if it is a different power or a variation of his other existing powers. It appears that when he heals certain people - or at least the people he's emotionally close to - they start to develop alien powers, as he healed Liz Parker and she later developed powers; it is also hinted that Kyle Valenti will develop them. It is possible that his healing ability sets off some sort of genetic chain reaction that enables those he's healed to access more of their brains' evolutionary potential – it was established that the "alien" powers he and the others possess are in fact abilities inherent in the human brain.

=== Relationship with Liz Parker ===
An important premise of Max's character (and the show itself) is that he's been in love with Liz Parker since the first time he saw her at school when he was just six years old (shortly after emerging from the pod). He keeps himself distanced from Liz, primarily because of his concerns about being an alien and her being a human. This secret ends in the pilot episode when she gets shot at the Crashdown Cafe and he saves her life, risking everything for her and starting the lead plot of the show.

Max intensely loves Liz more than he cares about his fellow alien-human hybrids or even himself. He shares a deep, mysterious connection with her that never finds a rational explanation. It is with her (albeit involuntary) help that he starts to find more clues about his origins. Liz is also able to feel whether Max is in danger or hurt (season three) and they save each other's lives more than once.

"The Max-Liz connection works so well, as is so popular with "Roswell"'s fans, because, in Moore's opinion, "It's very romantic in the classic sense of the word. Max is a young man from another planet, with secrets. He saved her life in the first episode, and they became soulmates across time and space. It's a classic set-up. Beyond that, the appeal of their relationship has a great deal to do with the chemistry between Shiri Appleby and Jason Behr."

— Ron Moore, Co-Executive Producer from Dec Starlog.

The relationship with Liz Parker is considered a very important aspect of the show and this character.

"Heart and Soul of Roswell, I think that Jason (Katims) would share this opinion, has always been the relationship between Max and Liz. That's where the plot begins. He saved her life and he exposes himself at the same time. The love between those two characters is fundamental to the show's success."

— Ron Moore, Co-Executive Producer.

==== Recurring themes ====
Due to the nature of their relationship and the difference between an alien boy and a human girl Max and Liz relationship is considered another modern example of forbidden lovers with many references to Romeo and Juliet through the series by both the characters and the writers/producers. Most notable examples are when Maria De Luca called them "modern Romeo and Juliet against the world" or when Liz Parker herself used the tragedy of Romeo and Juliet into one her own tragic speech in the episode "The end of the world" from season two. The producers and writers of the series weren't unaware of the parallelism.

"The episodes that I have really found have worked in that way are the pilot episode, which works really well because that’s really, to me, Romeo and Juliet. It’s really about two people meeting and falling in love, but not being able to be together, and I think it grabs you in that way."

— Jason Katims, Executive Producer and Creator,

Another recurring theme is the Soulmates created by their irrational connection and deep affinity and/or compatibility.

== Fictional biography ==
=== Season one ===
Viewers first see Max watching Liz work as a waitress while eating at the Crashdown Café, which belongs to Liz's parents. Fellow waitress Maria De Luca is the one who points out Max's infatuation to Liz. Liz then witnesses an argument between two customers and is accidentally shot. Max rushes to her side and heals the wound simply by placing his hand over it, bringing her back to life. Liz later discovers a silver hand print on her stomach, a mystery she becomes determined to solve. During a biology class experiment, Liz sneaks a sample of Max's saliva and examines it under a microscope, discovering that Max's cells look nothing like human cells. She confronts Max, who then admits that he, his sister Isabel and their friend Michael are aliens from the planet Antar, whose spaceship crashed at Roswell in 1947. By telling her, Max breaks the ultimate taboo that he, Isabel, and Michael have kept their whole lives. Liz becomes the first human to know the secret of the "Pod Squad". Overwhelmed by the secret, she asks Max why he'd risked everything to heal her. Max replies, "Because it was you." This sets the tone for the series: Max will break any rule (including his own) for Liz.

In order to gain her trust, Max creates a connection with her so she can see into his soul. Liz experiences all his inner feelings, especially the love Max has for her. After seeing Max's true character, Liz makes the decision to protect Max and his friends. Liz also begins to feel very drawn to Max in return, despite her current relationship with the sheriff's son Kyle Valenti. Liz confides in Maria about Max and the others, a transgression Max forgives. As the season progresses, Max and Liz's relationship and their struggles with his secret take center stage.

Liz later begs Max to use his healing powers to help save her aged grandmother, Claudia. Max reveals that he can not stop a natural death, but does help her have a final conversation with Claudia. Her grandmother's insights give Liz the clarity needed to break up with Kyle and pursue a relationship with Max.

The hybrids' search for answers about their own existence is a recurring theme of the show. Max comes to the conclusion that there is a fourth alien on Earth after he gets a job at the local UFO center. There he discovers that the silver hand print that Max had left on Liz had been spotted on a number of murder victims in the 1950s. During a Roswell crash convention, Max is nearly killed by an alien hunter named Hubble. Hubble is intent on revenge because an alien killed his wife and unborn child. Sheriff Jim Valenti saves Max's life.

The three hybrids and their romantic partners are portrayed as chaste throughout the first season. However, sexual themes are explored. In the episode "Sexual Healing", repressed passion explodes between Max and Liz. Liz finds that when they kiss, she gets flashbacks of Max's past. They later find an orb from his planet thanks to these visions.

Tess Harding arrives mid-season. At first, they suspect she is a shape-shifting murderous alien named Nasedo. After Max has hallucinations about her, he confronts Tess. It is revealed that she is an alien-human hybrid like them. Nasedo is actually Tess' father figure.

Nasedo is both a murderer and their protector, a conundrum that leaves the Pod Squad undecided about what to do. Nasedo then kidnaps Liz by shifting into the image of Max, leaving the true Max with a clear mandate to save Liz and terminate Nasedo. In the effort, Max is abducted by a special branch of the FBI headed by the elusive Special Agent Pierce. Max is tortured for information but rescued by Nasedo and Michael before he reveals anything significant. In turn, they manage to kidnap Pierce. In the subsequent confusion, gunfire erupts and the sheriff inadvertently shoots his son, Kyle. Michael kills Pierce while Max saves Kyle using the same method that he had used on Liz at the start of the season. Thankful, Sheriff Valenti gives Max his word that he will protect him, Isabel and Michael.

It is the ship hidden in the caves that eventually is the key to the hybrids' history. An image of Max and Isabel's mother comes up and tells them that they are the clones of the Royal Four of their home world Antar. Tess and Max were married, Isabel was his sister and a promised spouse of Michael, who was Max's second in command. Upon hearing this Liz runs away as she realizes that his destiny and responsibility are far bigger than her. He loves her and is reluctant to let her go but she says that there is too much in their way and leaves.

=== Season two ===
Max looking at Liz Parker in the episode "Ask Not".

The second season of the series finds Max as "reluctant king". The others now awkwardly defer to him, except for Michael who still acts out and does things his own way. At the beginning of season two, Max's relationship with Liz is awkward. He still loves her and declares to her that he will keep fighting for her and will never give up on them. His role as the leader also proves to be an obstacle as he finds out about power he never knew he had and the responsibility that comes with that power. But he is rocked when Nasedo is murdered and before dying, he proclaims that one of their worst enemies has arrived in Roswell: the skins. Worried by this, he and the gang agree to sit tight. They target Liz's new boss, Congresswoman Whitaker, who had a relationship with Special Agent Pierce, and do some reconnaissance on her. It is later revealed that the Congresswoman was in fact a Skin.

It is around this time that Max tries to resurrect his relationship with Liz, but she rejects his advances. He only gives up on her when he catches Liz in bed with Kyle Valenti, believing that they had been together. The truth is that it's all a setup created by Liz when the future version of Max comes back from the future saying that she had to make his present self stop loving her because their love will be the cause of the end of the world. Future Max and Future Liz sacrificed their love in order to make Tess stay in Roswell (in their timeline, she left after Max and Liz cemented their relationship), because she is obsessed with Max and would stay only if Max gives her a chance.

However, for most of season two, Max and Tess are only friends. He tries to be friends with Liz, though he never stops loving her even though he does not know the truth about Kyle. Things change, however when their friend Alex dies and his friendship with Liz is compromised by her research for Alex's alien killer that Max cannot accept. He then has his first personal crisis about who he really is and loses his balance. When Tess starts helping him to remember his past, Max is confused about himself. He starts acting out of character, causing his friends dislike him, especially Liz and Isabel.

Due to Tess' influence, he starts to think that maybe he is too blind to accept the truth. A truth that his life is not real and Tess is correct. When he realizes that he has really lost everything, especially Liz, he sleeps with Tess. She is the only one with him and seems to know answers that he is unable to find. Though the two of them are essentially strangers to each other, he does, however try and feel something for her, in line with his destiny. The day after their night together, he realizes his mistake and is unable to love her no matter whether his previous self (Zan) had feelings for her or not. It is now too late for him when Tess tells him of her pregnancy with his son and that she wants to keep the baby no matter what. Max takes responsibility, staying with her even though he's not happy.

At the end of the season, Tess mindwarps him into believing that the baby is sick and he cannot survive in the Earth's atmosphere so they are forced to "return" to Antar in order to save him. Thanks to the alien destiny book that Alex translated before his death, Max and his friends find the way to return home using the Granlith. Soon, Liz, Maria, and Kyle discover that Tess killed Alex. Max confronts her and realizes that the pregnancy was a ruse in order to force him and the other aliens to return home.

Nasedo had made a deal with Kivar 40 years before for Tess to get pregnant by Max's heir and then deliver Max, Michael, and Isabel to Kivar, who would have killed them. The purpose was to finally destroy the royal family. Max, now angry, wants to kill her but stops, realizing that she is still carrying his son. He lets her go to Antar to save the baby he still believes would not survive on Earth.

He regroups with Liz and the others on the mountainside. Max tells Liz that in his life, he was wrong about many things but not loving her. They embrace and the season ends with Max saying that he must save his son.

=== Season three ===
Desperate to bring his son to Earth, Max digs through Tess's belongings and discovers evidence leading him to a secret government facility in possession of the reconstructed ship that brought him and the others to Roswell. The ship is located underneath a convenience store in Utah. Having rekindled his relationship with Liz, the two of them devise a robbery, Liz holding up the store with a gun, while Max goes underneath the store to locate the ship. When there, he runs out of time trying to figure out how to work it, before they are captured by the police. Although the charges against Max and Liz are dismissed due to deft legal work by his father, the latter demands to know his reasons for robbing the store, and Max, not wanting to get his father mixed up in the alien affairs, leaves the house to stay with Michael. Subsequently, Liz's parents forbid her to see Max again, and the two of them are forced to carry on their relationship in secret.

Max continues the search for his son. He discovers that there was a second alien protector sent in the ship with them who abandoned his responsibilities for a life as a Hollywood producer and currently goes by the name Cal Langley. Langley, who tried to interfere with Max's search for his son, killed an actor who played a role in the episode "Busted" in order to obstruct Max and Liz's plan and ultimately resulted in their arrest. When Max realizes this, Langley threatens his life again, attempting to force him to return home to Roswell.

Langley's reasons are rooted in his desire to be human, even though he lacks human DNA and cannot even feel or be hurt by fire. Therefore, he fears Max, who can make him alien again, but cannot kill him because he was made to protect him. After discovering that his protector is genetically programmed to obey his direct orders, Max forces Langley to help him find the ship again and use it in order to leave Earth. Langley advises that the ship is too damaged to work. Ultimately, when the ship is finally located, it doesn't work and does not leave the hangar. After the accident, Max takes Langley to his home to help him because he feels guilty for what had happened. Langley tells him that even though he is genetically Max's protector, he will always hate him.

After Max's apologies, Langley finally understands that the boy is just desperate and wants to save his baby, but doesn't know what to do. He then tells Max about things that would have been lost if the ship had really worked. Max finally understands and devastatingly realizes that he almost lost everything, especially Liz, whom he had promised to come back to as soon as he could. Kal's first and last advice to Max is "The more you embrace our alien side... The more you're gonna lose"

With the failure of his plan, Max gives up hope of finding his son until the episode "Samuel Rising", in which an autistic child named Samuel, seemingly mute, calls him "Daddy". Max starts to believe that maybe his son is using Samuel for the purpose of contacting him. Max then visits Samuel, in an effort to befriend him and using what happened to help Samuel as well. However, Max soon realizes that Samuel is not his son and the reason why he talked with him and "liked" him at first sight is attributed to qualities Max possesses, including being special and "different", just like Samuel. He thought that maybe Max could assist him to communicate with his parents and tell them he loved them, even if he could not tell it like other children. Later, Max, with Isabel's help create a shared dream with Samuel and his parents, giving Samuel what he wanted. The encounter with Samuel makes Max realize that Liz is his family and even if he really finds his son, nothing will not change. He then tells her at the end of the episode when they go at the ice skating together, fulfilling his promise to Liz at the beginning.

Later in the season, Liz begins developing alien powers of her own, evidently as a side effect of Max healing her over two years ago. She's sick and it seems that she could die. Max tries to find a solution and he's willing to contact even the FBI if it's necessary, but nothing seems to help her and it gets worse. When trying to heal her with the healing stones she explodes crying, telling him that he always hurts her like when he slept with Tess. Max realizes that even if she's stressed by what is happening to her, she really feels this way. When he tries to talk with her about it Liz decides to take a break from Roswell in order to understand who she is and what she wants. Max tells her that he loves her trying to make her understand that he will be there when she wants and he isn't angry with her for what she said. But, ultimately, Liz goes to a boarding school in Vermont after sending him a letter when she tells him that she does love him too but she has to go.

Back in Roswell, someone kills Michael's friend, Monk, at the Meta-Chem Corporation where they worked together. Later Michael finds that someone at Meta-Chem is tracking him and most likely they discovered that he's an alien and they killed Monk for this reason. With Valenti's help, Michael tries to discover the truth but someone kidnaps Valenti. Max, Michael and Isabel go to Meta-Chem in order to free him. Max is the one who finds him and he discovers that someone at Meta-Chem, led by their leader Meris, was tracking Michael because they thought that he was the healer alien.

Meris wants Max to heal her elderly husband. When Max tries to explain to her that he can't heal people who're dying for natural reasons, Meris blackmails him using Valenti's life, and Max is forced to try the heal. However, something goes wrong in the healing process and instead of healing Meris' husband Max gives his life to the old man. Max becomes the old one, and when the healing process ends a circle of fire emits from Max's body. The fire comes back to him and the room catches on fire. Valenti tries to help Max but it's too late; when he reaches out to touch him Max turns into dust.

At the same time in Vermont, Liz suddenly awakes feeling Max's death deep inside of her and knows that he's dead without a doubt. But Max isn't really dead. His soul is still inside Meris' husband, Clayton. Clayton assumes Max's body like if they switched their previous forms. At first, he is happy of the change for the better, but while he's kissing his wife he's hit by strong flashes of Max and Liz together from Max's soul, and he rolls over, agonized. At this point, he realizes that Max is still inside him, and he believes that the only way he can get rid of Max is to kill Liz. Clayton goes to Vermont, but when he sees her he realizes that Max's connection to the girl is stronger than he thought.

Later, when Clayton tries to kill Liz, Max takes control over his body in order to tell Liz to kill him. Liz doesn't want to hurt or kill Max, but he yells at her saying that she must do it otherwise Clayton will kill her so she must kill them both in order to save herself. However, Clayton takes the control again and while he's trying to kill Liz they both fall from the window to the ground of the school. While they're falling Max takes control over Clayton again and both him and Liz get flashes of their life and all the people they love. All Max sees are his memories with Liz and how she's his whole life so he sacrifices his life in order to save hers. He reaches out to project an energy field to break her fall without using one for himself. Then, even as Liz is cushioned in the protective green energy, Max falls to the ground without a protection. After a moment, the energy field blinks out and Liz drops down, falling closer to Max, both of them lying still. Later, Liz wakes up and, touching Max, realizes he is dead.

She tenderly caresses his face with her hands and bends over him in order to give him her last kiss. A single tear falls onto his cheek and a glow of white energy passes across his face. It begins to transform, taking on Clayton's original features, then fading back into Max's until he wakes up staring into her tearful eyes. Max tells her that she brought him back from death. Liz tells him that now they're even and they return to Roswell.

In Roswell, Max, Liz and their friends are still facing Max's death and "resurrection" when Michael, after Max's death, gets the royal seal of Antar and becomes the king/leader. Michael can't handle this change and he starts to act recklessly. He becomes dangerous and the group tries to find a solution. Eventually, Max takes the seal from him and returns to be the rightful king again even if he never liked this role. Michael finally understands how Max was right about being the king and how it's not a funny game to play.

Later, when a ship seems to crash in Roswell, Max and Michael help a girl and her father who were trapped by the government. Shortly afterward they discover that the crashed ship was Tess coming back to Earth, carrying Max's son with her. Calling him Zan, after his father, she says that Kivar betrayed her and their deal, and he rejected him as the heir of Antar because he is fully human, so she had to escape from the planet and return to Earth in order to save her son.

However, Max discovers that Tess, in order to force him to leave earth, mindwarped him about the baby, later on the end of season 2 when he thought that he was dying. Tess' arrival, however, has sparked government action because in order to protect her son she killed a whole military base. So, in the end of the episode, to ward them away from her son, she sacrifices herself, blowing up the military base and dying in the process and she asks Liz for help. Before dying she confesses to Liz that Max always loved only her and every time they were together she always got flashes of her from him.

However, this turn of events serves to resurrect the Special Unit to hunt for the aliens, and realizing someone will always be after him, Max gives Zan up for adoption, for his own safety.

Shortly after that, Liz starts to receive visions of the future while she's touching people. When she and Max are making out she gets one of her visions and she sees how the Special Unit will kill them at their own high school graduation. Not able to harm the Special Unit again, the group agrees to flee Roswell separately. Max gives up his throne because they're a group and their lives are in danger, he can't make all the decisions anymore and after all, he never really considered himself as the king nor the leader and they all have the right to choose what they want to do with their life.

Later, Max proposes to Liz and she accepts because they can't leave Roswell without each other, even if it means they'll be killed. However, at the high school graduation ceremony Max tries to sacrifice himself by taking FBI attention only on him in order to free the others but Michael saves him at last minute. After what happened, the group makes the decision to leave Roswell all together, instead of separately like they established before. Max, Liz, Michael, Maria, Isabel and Kyle then depart from Roswell into a van and Max makes the decision to use his powers in order to help people. One of the last scenes of the series shows Liz's father reading his daughter's journal where she wrote him a letter and told him about her wedding with Max and who he really was.

At the end of the series, Max and Liz get married in a small chapel in the desert and get back in the van, continuing their trek throughout the country with their friends.

== Jason Behr about his character ==
When Jason Behr first read the script he realized that Max wasn't one of those jerks he played before:

"When I first read the script I immediately understood what they were going for - the mystery, the suspense, the relationships, the unrequited love story. I related to Max's search for the truth about himself, about life, about his place in this world, which I think everybody goes through."

— Jason Behr, Behring It All, "Crash Into Me" by Robyn Burnett

Jason was drawn to the story as soon as he read the script and he explained why:

"I think it was everything. The script was rich with metaphor and irony that kept it a little light, but it was also very honest about relationship and about emotion, and just -- it was one of those things that had a bunch of different elements and a good story. It was very hard to say no to something like that. Themes like teen alienation and the search for self and your place in the world, I think that everybody can kind of associate with.

— Jason Behr, Jason Behr on AOL Live!

Regarding Max's personality Behr found enjoyable the fact that his character actually has undergone a true evolution throughout the show:

"I think he's evolved in several ways,' says Behr. 'In the beginning, he was the conscience of the groupthe thinker, the one who, before taking any action, thought of the different consequences of what they decided to do. Given their situation, every move they make is imperative to their survival and secret. So he was like the rockthe conscience, the one who tried to get everyone to do the right thing. I think he learned over the course of this year that he can't always take positions and always tell people what the right or wrong thing to do is. He has learned not to be as controlling as he was before, and allow people to make mistakes on their own and learn from them. The only problem with that is he's still kind of struggling with that attitude, because some of the mistakes other people might make could have serious consequences for everyone. Michael, for instance, wants so badly to find a way home, but to the other characters Roswell is home. He'll do whatever it takes and whatever it costs to do this. It's very hard for Max to get through to him and make Michael understand what he's doing could be dangerous for everyone involved. Yet everyone on the show has choices they have to make, but at what cost? So it's a real delicate thing where Max is still learning."

— Jason Behr, The Behr Necessities

As for the theme of the show (the aliens) Behr also believes in extraterrestrial life as a possibility that we should consider:

"I try and remain open-minded about it,' Behr replies. 'If people thought one way only and didn't allow themselves to expand their views and be open-minded about the possibility of things, we'd be having this conversation with two tin cups and a really long string. We would be stuck in the Dark Ages. We would not evolve. There are people out there who will tell you that there is no way there will ever be contact with alien life. Maybe they're right, but maybe they're wrong. There were people for many years who said there would be no way we could recreate human tissue, and now they can grow a new ear. If you told my grandfather that some day we would be able to walk on the moon, he would have laughed at you and probably called you crazy. There are certain schools of thought that only believe one thing. And if they don't remain open-minded about possibilities beyond what they know, then they're going to be lost. If anything, the show has done that for me. I always was open-minded, but dealing with this material has opened my mind up even more to the possibilities"

— Jason Behr, The Behr Necessities

== Reception ==
Although in the original story Max Evans was supposed to be a blond guy with incredible blue eyes Jason Behr, who is dark-haired and mysterious instead, got the role however and he was the first choice between many other actors that could have played the role. According to one of the confirmed rumors about the actors that could have played Max's role, Heath Ledger was one of them but Fox went with Jason instead. David Nutter explained why Behr won the part:

"Jason is one of the most naturally gifted actors I've ever worked with. We talked a lot about this character during the show's easily stages. Even in the audition process we talked about him and he totally got the guy. He understood Max's humility, he understood that that was Max's strength. There's also a wonderful calmness, maturity and wisdom about the guy that i thought was very important. All three aliens needed to [convey a sense of] wisdom that was something other than what you would expect in a young person, and he was perfect at that"

— David Nutter, Executive Producer, from "Crash Into Me" by Robyn Burnett

Melinda Metz, the original books' writer stated more than once that she really liked the choice and she believed that Jason Behr was the right actor for Max and she herself never really saw the character like the model her book publisher gave to her for the physical description of Max.

"I though he was an amazing choice for Max. He really does have that intensity — just the way he looks at Liz —and you feel the longing. I always felt that Max was the cautious, responsible and a good person, but with all this bubbling underneath. I think he really conveys that, which is hard to do, because it's all internal."

— Melinda Metz, Original Books Writer

Thanks to his portrayal of Max Evans Jason Behr also won an award in the "Standout Performance by a Young Actor" category at the Young Hollywood Awards in the year 2002. He also got nominated for two years consecutively (2000 and 2001) both at the Teen Choice Awards (in the category TV - Choice Actor) and at the Academy of Science Fiction, Fantasy & Horror Films, USA (Saturn Award).
