= Maria DeLuca =

- Roswell character
- First appearance: "Pilot" (episode 1.01)
- Last appearance: "Graduation" (episode 3.18)
- Created by: Character; Melinda Metz; Developed for Television; Jason Katims
- Portrayed by: Majandra Delfino

In-universe information
- Species: Human
- Gender: Female
- Family: Amy DeLuca (mother); Sean DeLuca (cousin)
- Significant other: Michael Guerin (boyfriend)

Maria DeLuca is a fictional character created by Melinda Metz for the young adults book series Roswell High. The character was also adapted by Jason Katims for the 1999—2002 American science fiction television series Roswell. She was portrayed by actress Majandra Delfino in the television series. In the CW reboot, she is played by Heather Hemmens.

== Fictional character summary ==
Maria DeLuca is characterised to be high-strung, quirky and sarcastic. She does not excel in academic subjects but she is shown to be a very talented musician with an interest in photography. She lives with her single mother Amy DeLuca in Roswell, New Mexico. Maria's parents broke up when she was a little girl. Although she is the character who struggles most with the aliens' secret, Maria is also shown to keep cool under pressure.

== Fictional biography ==
=== Season one-Where Maria Meets The Aliens ===
In season one, Maria reluctantly becomes part of the three aliens' secret. When her best friend Liz Parker gets shot, she is healed by Max Evans. Max turns out to be an alien, along with his sister Isabel Evans and his best friend Michael Guerin. Liz shares this secret with Maria. Although Maria seems terrified of them at first, when Isabel walks into her dream, she comes through when she refuses to tell Sheriff Valenti Isabel's true identity, thus earning the three aliens' trust. Although Maria is intimidated by Isabel, the two become friends, when Isabel helps Maria at the Crashdown Café when she is in a sticky situation.

Maria's real storyline begins in "285 South" when Michael abducts Maria and her mother's car. During the ride with Maria, their relationship starts to develop. For the first time she sees the emotional, lonesome and smart guy Michael actually is.

They begin to reluctantly fall in love with each other. Over the course of the season, the two engage in a tumultuous on-again, off-again relationship. Maria is first hurt and disappointed that all Michael seems to want is a physical relationship and is constantly comparing his behaviour to Max when the two become an item, and trying to make him treat her better, something that hurts and annoys Michael greatly. Michael tries to change for her but he cannot be like Max. However, it is shown that despite their animosity towards each other, they genuinely care about each other. Maria will be the only person who can comfort Michael after being abused by his foster father. He ends up crying in her arms.

Maria constantly worries about Michael, Liz and the rest of the group throughout the season and appears frightened by the situations that they all get into, though she stays surprisingly calm in the middle of them. After the attendance in a holy ritual, Michael falls ill and finds himself in a frightening, hallucination condition. Maria will take care of him while the others are trying to find a solution to rescue him.

However, events soon conspire to push Maria and Michael apart. Tess arrives in town and Michael starts getting visions that he might be with Isabel - at one point they think she might even be pregnant with his child through some alien dream connection. This proves incorrect and the ordeal gives Michael the push to become fully committed to Maria.

At the end of the season, when Michael and Maria seem to be finally happy together, Michael breaks up with her saying, "I love you too much". He feels that he is too dangerous for her, having just killed Agent Pierce, and walks away, leaving Maria in order to learn about his destiny.

=== Season two — Laurie's Home ===
At the beginning of the second season, it is discovered that Maria has been constantly calling Michael through the summer months although he has not been replying. Although she continues trying to rekindle their relationship, Michael consistently brushes her aside, often coldly and unfeelingly, deeply hurting Maria.

As the group is threatened by a race of aliens on earth called the Skins, Michael and Maria banter while investigating one of them, named Courtney, and they discover that she has a shrine to Michael in her cupboard. Michael later has a short fling with Courtney, at which point Maria tells him her love is over. As the danger of the Skins grows stronger, however, Maria finds herself running to Michael when she fears for his safety.

When the Skins are back to take revenge, Maria is left to save the day, using her science skills, which are almost non-existent. She succeeds and saves everyone's lives.

Michael and Maria unofficially start their relationship again, with Maria becoming just as controlling as in season one. She tells him to get her a "damn present" for Christmas or she'll never speak to him again. In a last minute emergency, Michael gives her some earrings bought by Isabel, which Maria loves. Maria also develops a close friendship with the UFO Center manager, Brody Davis, and gets Max to heal Brody's daughter, who has bone marrow cancer.

Michael and Maria go on a mission in mid-season two to help Michael's "sort-of sister", Laurie. They want to reclaim Laurie's home, which is being unrighteously occupied by her aunt and uncle, and to protect her from alien threats along the way. The two are faced with huge danger, in which Michael gets shot in the shoulder. However, he manages to save the day and thanks to Maria, Laurie gets her home back.

When the group goes to Las Vegas for a holiday, Michael, in Maria's opinion, does not pay her enough attention. However, as a surprise, he arranges for her to sing in a fancy club, which she told him was her dream, proving that he does listen to her after all. She kisses him in thanks.

But later on Michael refuses to go to the school prom. An attitude Maria doesn't understand. She then suspects he is having an affair when he tells her he "has plans" that don't involve her. She spots him with another woman and bursts into tears. It is later discovered when he shows up late to the prom that the woman was his dancing teacher. He was taking lessons because he knew the prom was important to Maria.

When Maria and Liz's best friend, Isabel's love interest and a friend of the group, Alex Whitman, dies under suspicious circumstances, Maria suffers greatly. Michael proves to be an emotional rock for her and her mother through the main grieving period, and Maria's mother begins to fully appreciate the sort of guy he is. While Liz attempts to prove that Alex's death was a murder, Maria prefers to try to make tributes to Alex's memory, using her photography skills. However, Liz eventually convinces her that there is something more to his death than meets the eye, and the two travel to Las Cruces to discover what that was. The two girls get help from Michael who wants to protect Maria all the way.

Michael eventually confesses to Maria exactly what she means to him and shows his vulnerable side to her, allowing her to see flashes of his tragic past, using his powers. The two spend the night for the first time before he tells her he must leave to go back to his home planet, Antar. Several minutes before he is about to leave, Michael realizes he has finally found home, says farewell to Max and Isabel and decides to stay on Earth with Maria.

=== Season three – Forever Together ===
Maria first appears in season three visiting Liz in jail after Liz and Max got arrested. Liz and Max were holding up a store in search for a spaceship. She brings Liz a slice of "alien lime pie", which rewards her with being called a "goddess". It is revealed that Michael has been attending school and has got an extra part-time job as a security guard to be better for Maria, and to earn more money to pay for their dates.

For the first time, he has a group of male friends, which causes Maria to be jealous, as they do something she is unable to do—make Michael laugh. After insisting that he spend more time with her, which causes him to sneak around behind Maria's back, she realizes that having friends is important to him and she tells him she loves him.

When Maria's old flame and music partner, Billy, comes to town, he makes her realize that she has been missing out on a normal life. Michael becomes jealous of this new male in Maria's life, causing his powers to go out of control, particularly when he sees Billy and Maria singing together. He believes that Billy still has feelings for Maria, which she strongly denies. His suspicions are proved correct when Billy kisses Maria, and although she does not reciprocate his feelings, it causes her to break up with Michael, on the grounds that although she loves him, she doesn't want the "alien chaos" that comes with him.

The breakup leaves Michael hurt and confused. He attempts to win her back, rather than giving her space, when he volunteers as Santa at the same time that she volunteers as an elf. She confesses that she misses him and kisses him, but they are interrupted by a kid. She then holds her resolve and tells him that she doesn't want to be right back where they were.

At New Years, the gang is in a search for a legendary party. Michael gets drunk when he sees Maria flirting with other men. He doesn't feel well because alcohol is extra bad for an alien. However, when he hears her complaining to Liz, he tells her that he's fine (although he isn't) and to go on without him, which sparks Maria's emotions.

Maria is soon discovered by talent scouts when she sings with the sheriff, and they offer her a deal and a chance to go to New York City. The first person she wants to tell is Michael, and the two sleep together again. Michael thinks this is because they are getting back together, whereas Maria just thought it was a capper to a great night. When she confesses this to Michael, she hurts him once again.

Eventually, she realizes that the glamorous lifestyle of a musical artist isn't what it was cracked up to be and she returns to Roswell, only to find a bitter Michael, who in an alien-related rage, angrily tells her that he stayed on the planet for her and she showed her appreciation by dumping him, before throwing her out of the car. Maria does not seem especially hurt by this.

Just as the two begin to show slow signs of getting back together, it is discovered that Michael, Isabel, Max and Liz are in danger and must leave Roswell, leaving Maria feeling lost. It seems that she doesn't want out of the alien chaos after all. When Michael stated that he will leave first with no mention of Maria, she shouts at the group and walks off crying, not knowing what to do or what is going to happen. Before Michael leaves, he finally tells Maria that he has loved her ever since the day he stole her car, and that he always knew she was the girl for him. With that he rides off, leaving Maria at the side of the road. When Michael comes back to save Max, Maria announces that she is coming with them and tells Michael that this is her choice and that whatever happens, the two of them are in it together. She finally realizes that she would rather have a chaotic life with her love Michael, than a normal life without him. She rides off in the van towards the unknown future with the rest of the group.
