= Roswell (TV series) =

1999 American science fiction TV series

- Intertitle used in Seasons 1 & 2
- Also known as: Roswell High
- Genre: Science fiction
- Based on: Roswell High by Melinda Metz
- Developed by: Jason Katims
- Starring: Shiri Appleby; Jason Behr; Katherine Heigl; Majandra Delfino; Brendan Fehr; Colin Hanks; Nick Wechsler; William Sadler; Emilie De Ravin; Adam Rodriguez
- Narrated by: Shiri Appleby; Majandra Delfino
- Music by: Joseph Williams; Will Edwards; Jon Ernst
- Opening theme: "Here with Me" by Dido
- Country of origin: United States
- Original language: English
- No. of seasons: 3
- No. of episodes: 61 (list of episodes)

Production
- Executive producers: Jason Katims; Lisa J. Olin; Kevin Kelly Brown; Jonathan Frakes; David Nutter
- Producers: John Heath; Barry Pullman
- Running time: 42 minutes
- Production companies: Jason Katims Productions; Regency Television; 20th Century Fox Television

Original release
- Network: The WB
- Release: October 6, 1999 – May 21, 2001
- Network: UPN
- Release: October 9, 2001 – May 14, 2002

Related
- Roswell, New Mexico

Roswell is an American science fiction television series that presents a timeline where the Roswell UFO exists, and aliens are hiding in plain sight as a trio of high school-aged teenagers. Developed, produced, and co-written by Jason Katims, the series aired on The WB from October 6, 1999 to May 21, 2001, and later on UPN from October 9, 2001 to May 14, 2002. Sixty-one episodes in total were broadcast over the show's three seasons. In the United Kingdom, the show aired as both Roswell High and Roswell.

The series is based on the Roswell High young adult book series, written by Melinda Metz and edited by Laura J. Burns, who later became staff writers for the television series.

A reimagining of the series, Roswell, New Mexico (2019–2022), aired for four seasons on the CW.

== Cast ==
Season 2 main cast: Shiri Appleby, Nick Wechsler (Back row, left to right); Katherine Heigl, Colin Hanks, Emilie de Ravin, Majandra Delfino (Middle row); William Sadler, Jason Behr, Brendan Fehr (Front row).

=== Main ===
- Shiri Appleby as Liz Parker: A teenage girl who discovers the aliens' true identities after Max saves her life. The two develop a relationship.
- Jason Behr as Max Evans: The Alien Leader of the Royal Four with healing powers. Throughout the series, Max struggles with his relationship with Liz, his mysterious past, and developing as a leader.
- Brendan Fehr as Michael Guerin: Max's best friend. Michael is an alien who struggles to find his place on Earth. He has a relationship with Maria. He has difficulty controlling himself, especially when his emotions are strong. His special power is never revealed.
- Katherine Heigl as Isabel Evans: Max's sister, who struggles with the weight of her secret alien identity. Isabel has the power to "dream-walk", or enter people's minds during their dreams or her own.
- Majandra Delfino as Maria DeLuca: Liz's best friend who is in on the secret. She is in a relationship with Michael and struggles with it.
- Colin Hanks as Alex Whitman: Liz and Maria's best friend who helps them on their adventures while nurturing a crush on Isabel.
- Nick Wechsler as Kyle Valenti: Jim's son who overcomes initial suspicions about Max to eventually become a friend.
- William Sadler as Sheriff Jim Valenti: The town sheriff who starts out as an enemy but becomes a powerful ally. He later becomes the Royal Four's new protector after Nasedo dies. He also becomes the legal guardian of Tess as well.
- Emilie de Ravin as Tess Harding: The "fourth" alien who was raised by Nasedo. Tess has the power to "mind-warp", or cause people to see things that are not really happening.
- Adam Rodriguez as Jesse Ramirez

=== Recurring ===
- Garrett M. Brown as Philip Evans: Max and Isabel's adoptive father
- Mary Ellen Trainor as Diane Evans: Max and Isabel's adoptive mother
- Diane Farr as Amy DeLuca: Maria's single mother
- John Doe as Jeff Parker: Liz's father and owner of the Crashdown Cafe
- Jo Anderson as Nancy Parker: Liz's mother
- Nicholas Stratton as Young Michael (season 1): Appears in several flashback sequences
- Julie Benz as Kathleen Topolsky (season 1): FBI agent posing as a high school guidance counselor
- Jim Ortlieb as Nasedo (seasons 1–2): Alien sent from Antar to watch over the Royal Four. He has the ability to shapeshift. He is murdered at the beginning of season 2 by "Skins."
- Michael Horse as Deputy Owen Blackwood: Sheriff Jim Valenti's assistant
- Steve Hytner as Milton Ross (season 1): Owner of the UFO center
- Richard Schiff as Agent John Stevens (season 1): FBI agent from a special unit tasked with investigating alien existence
- David Conrad as Deputy David "Dave" Fisher/FBI Agent Daniel Pierce (seasons 1–2): Head of the FBI special unit assigned to investigate alien existence
- Devon Gummersall as Sean DeLuca (season 2): Maria's delinquent cousin who has feelings for Liz
- Desmond Askew as Brody Davis/Larek (season 2): New owner of the UFO center who has a young daughter and passion for researching aliens
- Gretchen Egolf as Congresswoman Vanessa Whitaker (season 2): Congresswoman for whom Liz is an assistant before her identity as a "Skin" is discovered
- Sara Downing as Courtney Banks (season 2): "Skin" who works at the Cafe and thinks Michael should be the leader of the Royal Four
- Miko Hughes as Nicholas Crawford (season 2): Powerful "Skin" who has the appearance of a teenage boy

=== Guest stars ===
- Daniel Hansen as Young Max (season 1)
- Sebastian Siegel as Brad
- Carroll Baker as Grandma Claudia (season 1)
- John Cullum as James Valenti Sr. (season 1)
- Jonathan Frakes as Himself (seasons 1 and 3)
- Genie Francis as Queen Mother of Antar (season 1)
- Erica Gimpel as Agent Susan Duff
- Ned Romero as River Dog, old native American man (season 1)
- Howie Dorough as Alien (season 1)
- Nelly Furtado as Herself (season 2)
- Jason Dohring as Jerry (season 2)
- Spence Decker as Kivar (season 3)
- Morgan Fairchild as Meris Wheeler (season 3)
- Joe Pantoliano as Kal Langley (season 3)
- John Billingsley as Himself (season 3)
- Michael Pena as Fly (season 3)
- Missi Pyle as Windy (season 3)
- Ivonne Coll as Mrs. Ramirez (season 3)
- Kristoffer Polaha as Eric Hughes (season 3)
- Terry O'Quinn as Carl (season 3)

== Episodes ==
Season	Episodes	Originally released		
Season	Episodes	First released	Last released	Network
1	22	October 6, 1999	May 15, 2000	The WB
2	21	October 2, 2000	May 21, 2001	The WB
3	18	October 9, 2001	May 14, 2002	UPN

== Production ==
Roswell High was originally developed by 20th Century Fox Television and Regency Television for the Fox Network, but it eventually landed on The WB (retitled simply to Roswell) thanks to the latter network's offer to extend a full 22-episode upfront commitment. The pilot episode was filmed in 12 days with a budget of $2,000,000. "The Morning After," the second episode of the series, was the first episode with the full title sequence utilizing the theme song, "Here With Me" by Dido.

== Filming locations ==
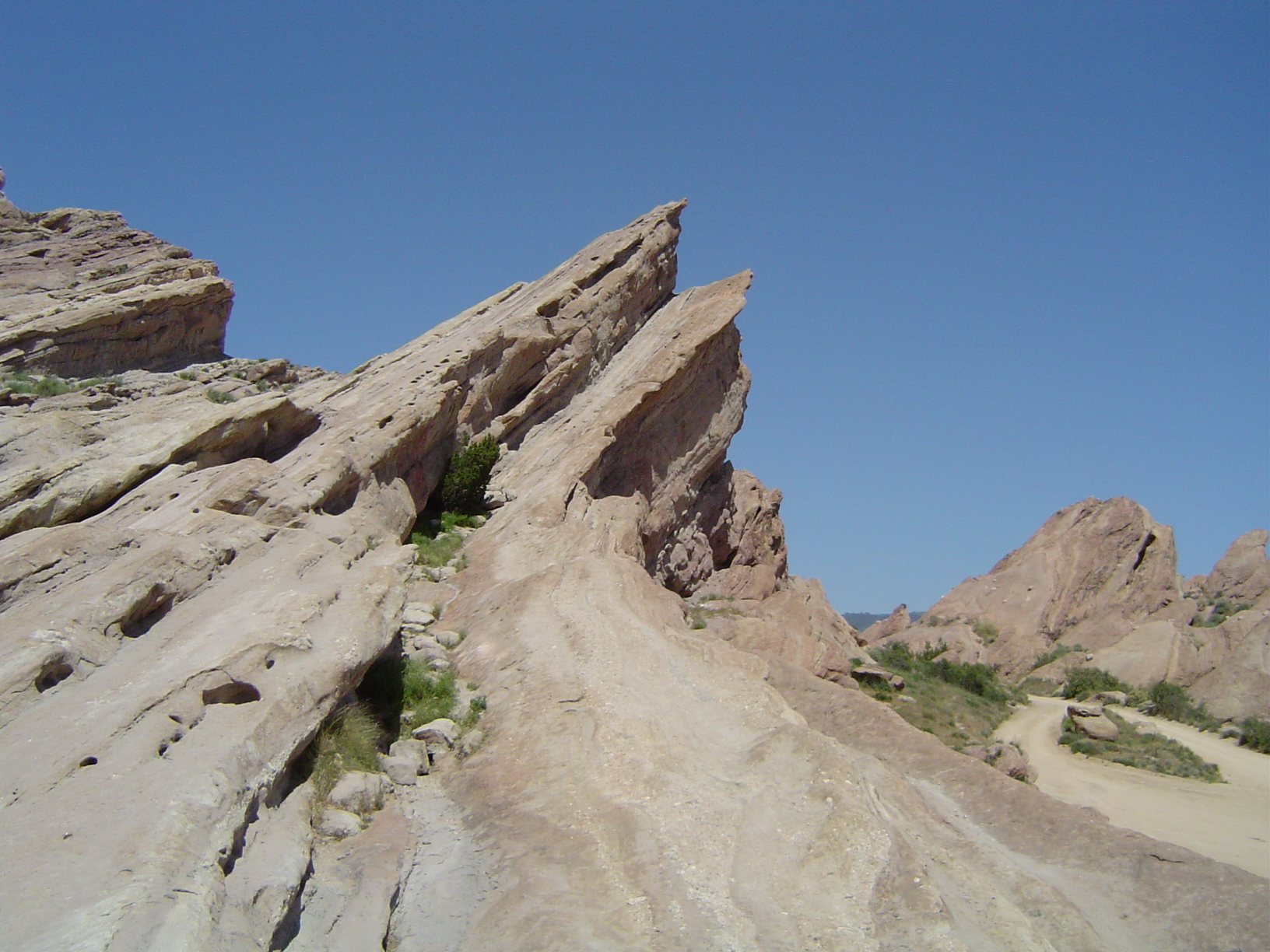
Vasquez Rocks Natural Area Park.

Roswell was filmed in various locations around California. City Hall, Charter Oak High School, and several other businesses and residences in Covina served as stand ins for fictional locations in Roswell, New Mexico, as well as Vasquez Rocks, a 905-acre (370 ha) park in Los Angeles County. Episode 1 of season 3 was filmed partially in Salina, Utah.

== Airing history ==
The series premiered on October 6, 1999, on The WB in the United States to generally favorable reviews, and quickly gained an outspoken fanbase.

In response to low ratings during the first season, the relationship-driven stand-alone episodes of the early first season were to be replaced with more science fiction themes and multi-episode plot arcs. Starting with the second season, after a fierce fan-driven campaign involving bottles of Tabasco sauce—a favorite condiment of the show's alien characters—were sent to the network's offices, veteran science fiction writer Ronald D. Moore was brought in as an executive producer and showrunner to further develop the science fiction elements of the show.

Not all fans responded favorably to the shift to more science fiction-driven storylines during the second season and the ratings continued to disappoint, causing the network to finally cancel the show on May 15, 2001, after the show's second-season finale. However, producing studio 20th Century Fox persuaded UPN to commit to a third season as a package deal when UPN outbid The WB for one of its popular flagship series, Buffy the Vampire Slayer. During the 2001–2002 television season, Roswell, in its third season, aired directly after Buffy on Tuesday nights on UPN, though it was unable to hold on to the audience Buffy provided. This led to the show's final cancellation.

Internationally, Roswell has been broadcast in Sri Lanka under the same name in Sinhalese "රොස්වෙල්" with Sinhalese subtitles by the Sri Lanka Rupavahini Corporation.

== Ratings ==
Season	Timeslot (EDT)	Season premiere	Season finale	TV season	Viewers (in millions)	Rating	Rank
1	Wednesdays 9:00 p.m. (October 6, 1999 – March 1, 2000) Mondays 9:00 p.m. (April 10, 2000 – May 15, 2000)	October 6, 1999	May 15, 2000	1999–2000	3.56	2.6/4	#128
2	Mondays 9:00 p.m.	October 2, 2000	May 21, 2001	2000–2001	4.0	2.7/4	#136
3	Tuesdays 9:00 p.m.	October 9, 2001	May 14, 2002	2001–2002	3.0	1.9/3	#136

== Plot ==
=== Season one ===
In the first season of Roswell, (premiering October 1999 on The WB) we meet high school students and best friends Liz Parker (Shiri Appleby), Maria DeLuca (Majandra Delfino), and Alex Whitman (Colin Hanks), residents of the small town of Roswell, New Mexico, site of the famed Roswell Incident. Liz Parker's parents own the Crashdown Café, which serves alien-themed dishes. At the beginning of the pilot episode, Liz is waitressing in her parents' restaurant when a disagreement between two customers breaks out. A gun is fired, and Liz is shot. We are introduced to a character named Max Evans (Jason Behr), a seemingly normal high school student, who rushes to Liz's aid and saves her life by healing the gunshot wound with his alien abilities. The healing leaves a silver hand print on her stomach. To hide what he has done, Max pours ketchup on Liz before fleeing the scene with his friend Michael Guerin (Brendan Fehr). The shooting acts as a catalyst for the rest of the series action.

Liz is presented as an insatiably curious character, obtaining a sample of Max's saliva, analyzing it, and finding that his cells do not look like normal human cells. When she confronts him, Max admits that he, his sister Isabel (Katherine Heigl) and their friend Michael, are aliens from the planet Antar, whose spaceship crashed at Roswell in 1947. A love triangle begins between Max, Liz, and Kyle Valenti (Nick Wechsler), the sheriff's son whom Liz was dating.

Max divulging the secret of his heritage to Liz and the series of revelations as other characters, first Maria and then Alex, give the first season of Roswell much of its narrative tension, secrecy and trust being important to character development, relationships, and plot. Fear of authority is another theme of the series, as the teenagers protect the secret from characters who are in positions of authority: Roswell's sheriff, Jim Valenti (William Sadler), and a series of FBI agents.

Two romances develop between human and alien characters. Liz and Max's romance is portrayed as tender and sweet, while Michael and Maria's is portrayed as passionate and often explosive. Later in the first season a tentative romance develops between Isabel and Alex.

Toward the end of the season another alien character is introduced. Nasedo is a shape shifter, with a violent, murderous past. The gang initially believes that new kid in town Tess Harding (Emilie de Ravin) is Nasedo because she seems to have a strange effect on Max, but this character turns out to be a teenage alien raised by Nasedo.

As the show's first season conculdes, it is revealed that Max, Isabel, Michael and Tess are clones of the "Royal Four" of Antar, the planet these characters come from. In a former life, Max was the king of his planet, Isabel his sister and a princess, Michael his second in command and Tess his wife and the queen. The four learn they are alien-human hybrids: their alien DNA was mixed with human DNA in order to allow them to look like humans and survive on earth. Their mission is to one day return to Antar and reclaim the throne from Kivar, Max's enemy in his previous life. As a result of this revelation, Liz distances herself from Max because she believes she cannot get in the way of Max's destiny.

=== Season two ===
Much of Roswell's second season (commencing October 2000 on The WB) concerns the 'will they/won't they' love story between Max and Liz, now that Liz knows Max has an ancient destiny to be with Tess. While Max reassures Liz of his love for her, and while Tess feels ostracised from the teenage gang of friends, a new upset to this romance arrives in the form of "Future Max." A version of Max from a future timeline has used time travel to return to a point where he can refocus Max away from his crush on Liz and back to his destined relationship with Tess, to save all the characters from a dark future. Liz steps aside but maintains hope that she and Max will one day be together.

The second season introduces the Skins, another alien race from Antar who have been searching for the alien hybrids since they hatched. Their mission is to locate and turn them over to Kivar, who is now king of Antar. It is revealed that Liz's new boss, Congresswoman Whitaker (Gretchen Egolf), is a Skin and her brother Nicholas is the leader of the Skins. Along with renegade Skin Courtney (Sara Downing), a Crashdown Café waitress, who believes Michael, not Max, should have been in charge of Antar, the group travels to Congresswoman Whitaker's home town to discover it is inhabited entirely by Skins who are ready for the "Harvest". Skins unlike "The Royal Four" do not contain a mix of alien and human DNA. In order to survive Earth's climate they create husks (fake bodies) which last around 50 years. Skins are so called because once their husks start to reach the end of their shelf lives, they shed their skin.

Tess's shape-shifting father Nasedo is killed by Congresswoman Whitaker, and Tess moves in with Sheriff Valenti and his son Kyle. The Roswell aliens destroy the Harvest and find out more about their past. Isabel is disturbed that on their home planet she was named Vilandra and was in love with Kivar, Max's enemy and rival, and betrayed her family in favor of Kivar. They also discover a second set of alien clones of the Royal Four were created, landing on Earth in New York City, exact copies of Michael, Max, Isabel and Tess, named Rath (Michael's clone), Zan (Max's clone), Lonnie (Isabel's clone), and Ava (Tess's clone). These clones have killed their Max/Zan and come to Roswell to convince Max to join them at a summit meeting of the families of the five warring planets.

Nicholas returns as a voice for Kivar, and it is revealed the owner of the UFO museum, Brody Davis (Desmond Askew), was used by an alien many times to communicate on Earth, acting as a puppet, explaining why he believes he was abducted by aliens although he has no memories of the incident. Max and Tess go with Isabel and Michael's clones to New York, where they are told they can return to their home planet if they give Kivar the Granilith (the rock which came with the Royal Four when they landed on Earth), but remembering advice from Liz, Max turns down Kivar's deal. Lonnie strikes a deal Nicholas exchanging Max's life for her own return to Antar, but her assassination attempt fails, and Rath and Lonnie "disappear". Tess's clone Ava is haunted by the death of her Zan/Max and remains in Roswell, revealing that since Max healed her she is no longer evil, and her character never reappears despite apparently living in the same town as Tess.

When Alex returns from a trip to Sweden, he finally makes a romantic connection but he dies tragically in a car accident. Liz is suspicious of the police ruling Alex's death a suicide and conducts her own investigation, uncovering evidence he may have been murdered. Liz's suspicions point to one of the aliens killing Alex, and she discovers that instead of Alex having been in Sweden, he had actually been in hiding while working on the translation of the Destiny book.

Angry at Liz's investigations of the aliens, Max sleeps with Tess who falls pregnant. Tess says alien pregnancies last a month and that the baby will not survive on Earth, and for the sake of the baby Max, Michael, Isabel and Tess prepare to travel to their home planet. As they say goodbyes to their human friends, Michael and Maria have sex for the first time and Max and Liz make a last-ditch effort to find Alex's killer. Liz discovers that Tess is the villain, having brainwashed Alex to translate the Destiny book and is responsible for his death. It is revealed Nasedo made a deal with Kivar: Tess can return home safely as long as she's carrying Max's child, but she must turn over Max, Isabel, and Michael to Kivar. Max lets Tess go and the gang watches as Tess leaves Earth via the Granilith. Maria realizes Michael stayed for her. Max tells Liz he loves her and now must save his son.

=== Season three ===
After being cancelled by The WB, Roswell returned for a third season on UPN with a storyline around Max's quest to save his son which doesn't get off to a good start when he and Liz are arrested in Utah after holding up a convenience store. They both end up getting out of jail, but their actions have serious consequences for the rest of the season. Liz's father sends Liz to a boarding school in Vermont. Max continues his hunt for an alien ship and the diamond key to the spaceship, his search taking him to Los Angeles where a shape-shifting alien is working as a film producer. Max tries out acting and auditions for a role in Star Trek: Enterprise. The fifth alien is, in fact Max's protector and they discover the location of an alien ship at a military base. They attempt to fly it, but the ship is too damaged from the crash in 1947. Max leaves L.A. disappointed, and he feels as though he has let down his son.

Isabel is being haunted by Alex's ghost, and begins a relationship with Jesse Ramirez, an attorney several years older than her and who works with Isabel and Max's adoptive human father. As the season unfolds, their father is diving deeper into the past of his children, not happy with Max's criminal behaviour. Isabel marries Jesse, but on her honeymoon is contacted by Kivar who reawakens Isabel's evil past self, Vilandra. Kivar tries to compel Isabel/Vilandra to travel through a portal back to their home world, while Max and Michael attempt to stop them. In the end, Isabel pushes Kivar into the portal.

Maria feels the whole "alien thing" is ruining her life and decides to take a break from the gang so she can try to live out a "normal" life. Michael takes a night job as a security guard at a local pharmaceutical factory, where its owners have set a trap for Michael. Knowing that he is an alien, they kill one of Michael's co-workers "Munk" to see if Michael is "the healer". Former Sheriff Valenti has been helping Michael uncover this conspiracy and is shot near his heart. Max gives away his identity as "the healer" saving Valenti, and is taken by the millionaire's desperate wife and goons and coerced into healing the dying millionaire. Max is wary of doing so, as the millionaire has lived out his life and will die of natural causes, but he tries anyway. Max ends up transferring his youth, and the millionaire's body transforms into Max's body, killing Max.

A grieving Michael and Isabel use their powers to escape the millionaire's security staff, but Isabel is shot. Michael unknowingly inherited Max's powers after his death, and then he heals Isabel during an emotional moment. He also reveals their alien secret to Jesse, who was going to cal the police. Meanwhile the millionaire, in Max's body, starts receiving Max's memories, especially unable to stop thinking about Liz. He feels the only way to kill Max's soul inside him is to find and kill Liz, and so travels to Vermont with his reluctant wife to find Liz. He murders his wife and in a struggle, falls with Liz from a window of Liz's boarding school. Seeing Liz is about to die, Max takes control over the body and uses his powers to save her life while he hits the ground. The millionaire's soul dies, and Max miraculously survives after Liz kisses him. The group heads back to Roswell.

Meanwhile, the FBI has been studying the group for many months and is closing in on them, and after Liz also displays alien powers inherited from Max, including premonitions, she also becomes their target. Tess returns from their alien homeworld with Max's son, Zan, and they too become targets of the FBI. Tess decides to sacrifice herself by turning herself in and blowing up the military base. The baby is revealed to be fully human, as only Max's and Tess' human DNA produced the baby. Max, realizing his son can have a normal life, gives him up for adoption; showing the Evans' parents driving the child away to New York.

The series closes with Liz getting a premonition of her, Max, Michael, and Isabel dying in an FBI setup, so they decide to leave Roswell after their high school graduation. Michael professes his love for Maria and she makes the decision to be with him no matter what. After Liz, Max, Michael, Isabel, Maria, and Kyle escape an FBI setup at their high school graduation, they hit the road in a van, where there are several emotional goodbyes, especially between Kyle and his father, Jim Valenti. Isabel decides to leave her husband behind in order to save his life. The final scenes of the show feature Max and Liz getting married and Liz's father reading her journal, chronicling the last three years. The series closes with Liz climbing into the van in her wedding dress and narrating, "I'm Liz Parker, and I'm happy".

== Home media ==
Season	Episodes	DVD release date		
Season	Episodes	Region 1	Region 2	Region 4
1	22	February 17, 2004	April 26, 2004	April 2, 2004
2	21	October 5, 2004	August 9, 2004	February 7, 2005
3	18	August 9, 2005	October 11, 2004	March 15, 2006

=== Soundtrack ===
A soundtrack of the series was released on February 26, 2002. The soundtrack featured Ash, Coldplay, Sarah McLachlan and others.

Although the show used many popular songs throughout its original airing, due to licensing issues many songs were replaced on the home video releases, with the new songs handpicked by the show's original music supervisors. There are notable exceptions in which songs that became important or symbolic plot moments were retained, such as the use of "Fear" by Sarah McLachlan and "Crash Into Me" by Dave Matthews Band in the pilot and "I Shall Believe" by Sheryl Crow in a later episode. Similarly, Dido's "Here with Me" was also kept as the show's opening theme music throughout all three seasons on DVD.

However, the German language track is the only audio track to contain the original music. Similarly, the syndicated episodes of the show also contain all of the original music.

== Novels ==
In addition to the original Roswell High book series that inspired the television series, a range of novels were published based on the events depicted in the show. These focused on events that largely went unexplained on screen.

=== Pocket Books ===
While Roswell was still on air, three novels were published by Pocket Books. When the show was cancelled, this series ceased publication.

1. Loose Ends by Greg Cox (June 2001)
2. No Good Deed by Dean Wesley Smith & Kristine Kathryn Rusch (August 2001)
3. Little Green Men by D.W. Smith and K.K. Rusch (April 2002)

=== Simon Spotlight Entertainment ===
In 2002, Simon Spotlight Entertainment picked up the Roswell range and published eight more novels. Following low sales, the series ended a year later. The first four novels act as a bridge between seasons two and three, and the last four are set after the events of the series.

1. Shades by Mel Odom (September 2002)
2. Skeletons in the Closet by Andy Mangels & Michael A. Martin (November 2002)
3. Dreamwalk by Paul Ruditis (January 2003)
4. Quarantine by Laura Burns (March 2003)
5. A New Beginning by Kevin Ryan (June 2003)
6. Nightscape by Kevin Ryan (July 2003)
7. Pursuit by Andy Mangels & Michael A. Martin (September 2003)
8. Turnabout by Andy Mangels & Michael A. Martin (November 2003)

== Re-imagining ==
On October 12, 2017, The CW announced that a re-imagining of the book series was in development. Unlike the original series, the new series has an immigration twist, focusing on the young daughter of undocumented immigrants who returns to her hometown of Roswell to shockingly discover that her teenage crush, now a police officer, is an extraterrestrial. On January 30, 2018, The CW issued a pilot order for the new version. On February 15, 2018, it was announced that Julie Plec would direct the pilot.

Production companies involved with the pilot include Amblin Television, Bender Brown Productions, CBS Television Studios and Warner Bros. Television (previously produced from Regency Television and 20th Century Fox Television).

On February 16, 2018, Jeanine Mason was cast in the lead role. Weeks later, it was announced that Nathan Parsons, Michael Trevino, Heather Hemmens, Michael Vlamis, Lily Cowles and Tyler Blackburn were added to the cast.

On May 11, 2018, it was announced that The CW ordered Roswell, New Mexico and would premiere on January 15, 2019. It concluded its run after four seasons in September 2022.
