= Nick Wechsler (actor) =

American actor (born 1978)

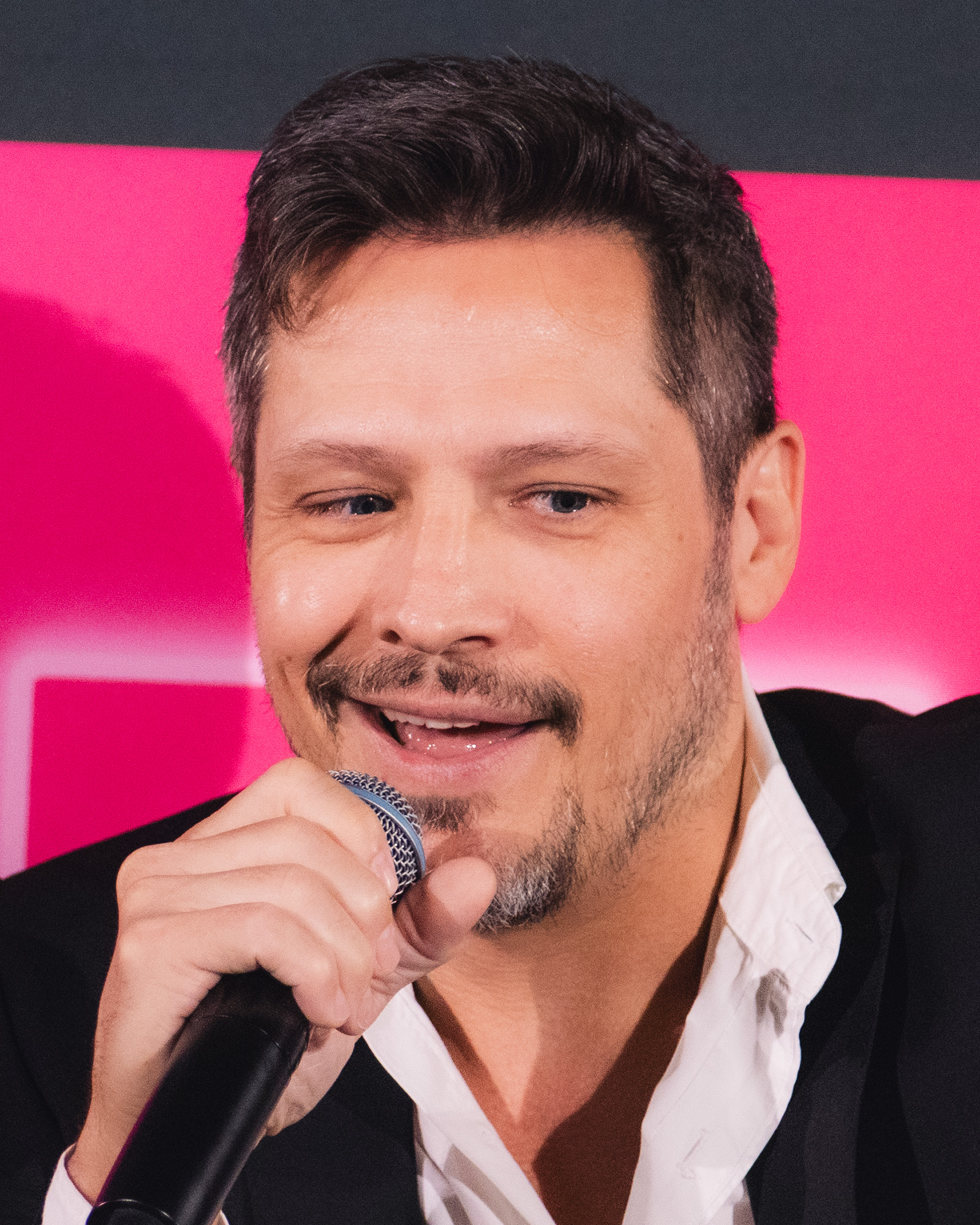
- Wechsler in 2026
- Born: Samuel Nicholas Wechsler; September 3, 1978 (age 47); Albuquerque, New Mexico, U.S.
- Occupation: Actor
- Years active: 1996–present

Samuel Nicholas Wechsler (born September 3, 1978) is an American actor. He is known for his roles as Kyle Valenti on The WB teen drama series Roswell (1999–2002) and Jack Porter on the ABC drama television series Revenge (2011–2015).

== Early life ==
Wechsler was born in Albuquerque, New Mexico. When he was 14, his older brother, aged 24, died of cancer. He moved to Hollywood after graduating from high school.

== Career ==
Soon after relocating to Los Angeles, Wechsler landed a small role as a purse-stealing punk in the television movie Full Circle. Shortly after, he was cast as Kevin "Trek" Sanders, a child prodigy conceived at a Star Trek convention, in the syndicated series Team Knight Rider. He also appeared in Silk Stalkings, The Lazarus Man, and the direct-to-video film The Perfect Game.

From 1999 to 2002, Wechsler starred as Kyle Valenti on the television series Roswell. After Roswell, he guest starred in number of television series, including Malcolm in the Middle, North Shore, Cold Case, Crossing Jordan, Terminator: The Sarah Connor Chronicles, Lie to Me, It's Always Sunny in Philadelphia and Chase. In 2008, he appeared in the independent film Lie to Me, about a couple navigating the hazards of an open relationship. From 2007 to 2008, he appeared in three episodes of Without a Trace.

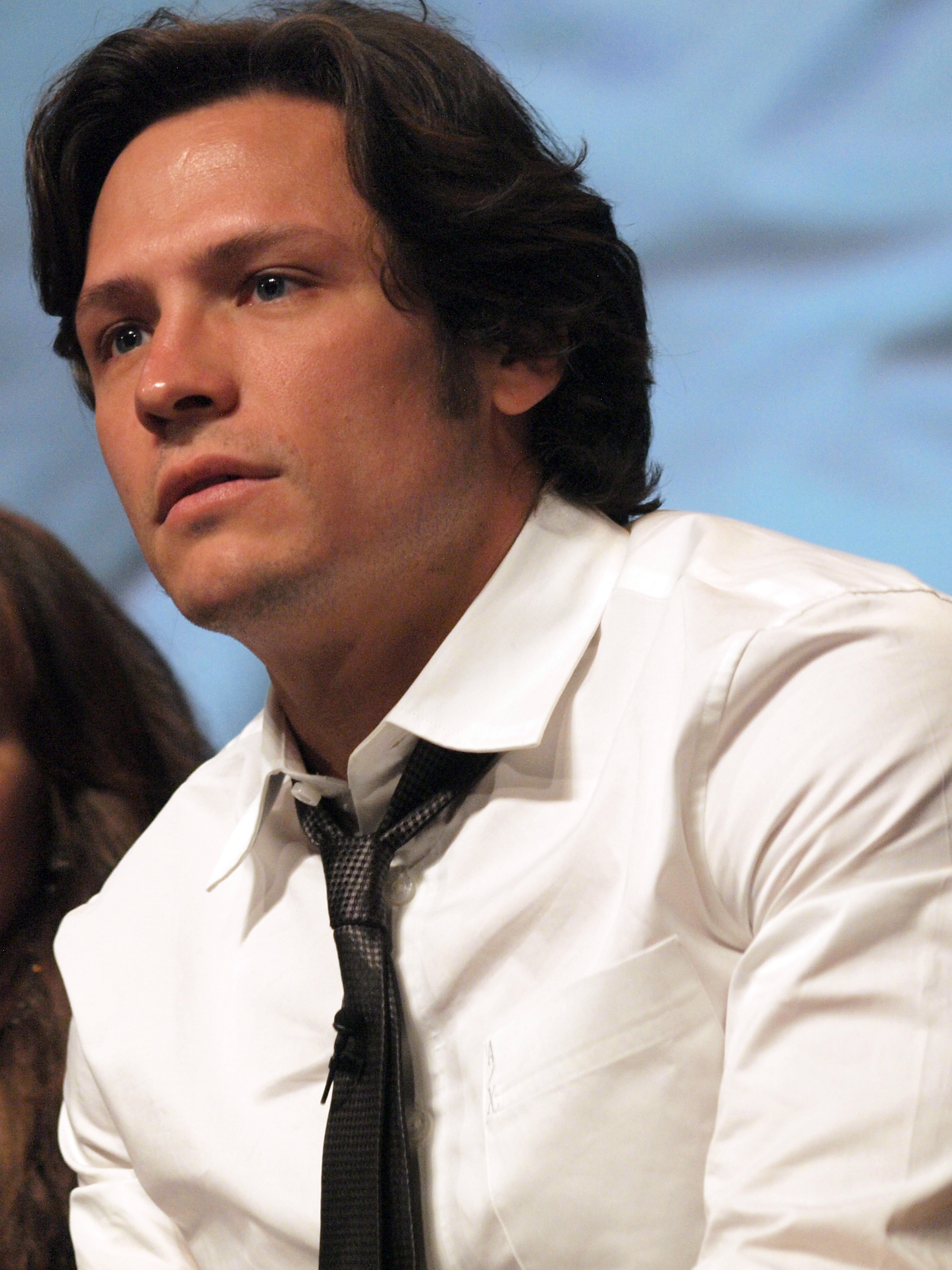
Wechsler at the PaleyFest in March 2012

In 2011, Wechsler won the main role of Jack Porter on the ABC series Revenge, playing the love interest of lead character Emily Thorne. After Revenge ended in 2015, Wechsler took a role on the NBC action series The Player. In 2016, he was cast in a recurring role in the fourth season of the NBC cop drama Chicago P.D. He took on a recurring role as Brandon Cole on NBC's Shades of Blue for the show's third season. Wechsler portrayed the recurring role of Matthew Blaisdel on The CW reboot series Dynasty from 2017 to 2018. In 2019, he was cast as Ryan Sharp on NBC's This Is Us.

== Filmography ==
=== Film ===
Year	Title	Role	Notes
2000	Chicks, Man	Nick	
2000	Perfect Game	State Umpire	Direct-to-video film
2008	Lie to Me	Luke	
2010	Switchback	Jonathan Weston	
2025	Primitive War	Eli Taylor	

=== Television ===
Year	Title	Role	Notes
1996	Full Circle	Mugger	Television film
1997	Team Knight Rider	Kevin "Trek" Sanders	Main role
1999–2002	Roswell	Kyle Valenti	Main role Nominated – Teen Choice Awards for Choice Sidekick (2002)
2003	Malcolm in the Middle	Donnie	Episode: "Reese's Party"
2004	Tru Calling	Marc Colvin	Episode: "D.O.A."
2004	North Shore	Justin Silver	Episode: "The Big One "
2005	Cold Case	Manny	Episode: "The Promise"
2006	Crossing Jordan	Hooper	Episode: "Thin Ice"
2006	Vanished	Gabe Barnett	Episodes: "The Velocity of Sara", "Warm Springs"
2007–2008	Without a Trace	Joe Guisti	3 episodes
2007	Terminator: The Sarah Connor Chronicles	Deputy Ridge	Episode: Pilot
2009, 2011	It's Always Sunny in Philadelphia	Brad	3 episodes
2009	Past Life	Brian	Episode: "Soul Music"
2010	Chase	Adam Rothschild	Episode: "Above the Law"
2011–2015	Revenge	Jack Porter	Main role Nominated – Teen Choice Awards for Choice TV Actor: Drama (2013)
2015	The Player	Nick	4 episodes
2016	Recon	Freddie	Unsold television pilot
2017	Chicago PD	Kenny Rixton	Recurring role (season 4)
2017–2018	Dynasty	Matthew Blaisdel	4 episodes
2018	Shades of Blue	Anthony Cole	Recurring role (season 3)
2019	This Is Us	Ryan Sharp	Episodes: "Strangers", "Storybook Love"
2019	For All Mankind	Fred	Episodes: "Red Moon", "He Built the Saturn V", "Into the Abyss"
2021	All Rise	Deputy Pete Rashel	2 episodes
2022	The Boys	Blue Hawk	
2025	The Hunting Party	Oliver Odell	Main role
2025	High Potential	Jason Howard	Episodes: "Pawns", "Checkmate"
