= Laura J. Burns =

American author

- Born: United States
- Occupation: Writer, editor
- Genre: Young adult literature, science-fiction

Website
- melindaandlaura.com/laura-j-burns

Laura J. Burns is an American author originally from Long Island, New York. Starting in publishing, she now specializes in novels based on television shows or movies. She often collaborates with fellow author Melinda Metz, with whom she writes the book series based on the Everwood TV show, the Wright and Wong young detective series, and the Vampire Beach series under the pseudonym of Alex Duval. She was closely involved with creating the Roswell High series, and later became a staff writer on the Roswell TV series.

== Early life and education ==
Burns spent her childhood on Long Island, NY. She moved after high school and attended Barnard College.

== Career ==
Burns started her career as a book editor in New York, working on series like Sweet Valley High, and Goosebumps.

Together with author Melinda Metz, they created the Roswell High series (which eventually became the TV series Roswell). When the TV series became a reality, Burns moved to Los Angeles to work as a writer on the show.

== Selected works ==
- Roswell: Quarantine (2003)
- Charmed: Seasons of the Witch vol. 1 - Samhain & Imbolc (2003)
- Charmed: Inherit the Witch (2004)
- Charmed: Sweet Talkin' Demon (2006)
- Darcy's Wild Life: A Fine State of Affairs (2006)
- Darcy's Wild Life: Go West Darcy! (2006)

With Melinda Metz

- "Abomination, Beauport, Brittany, France, 1320" in Tales of the Slayer vol. 2 (2003)
- Buffy the Vampire Slayer: Apocalypse Memories (2004)
- Buffy the Vampire Slayer: Colony (2005)
- Everwood: First Impressions (2004)
- Everwood: Making Choices (2004)
- Everwood: Worlds Apart (2005)
- Everwood: Change of Plans (2005)
- Wright and Wong: The Case Of The Prank That Stank (2005)
- Wright and Wong: The Case of the Nana-Napper (2005)
- Wright and Wong: The Case of the Trail Mix-Up (2005)
- Wright and Wong: The Case of the Slippery Soap Star (2005)
- Kong, the 8th Wonder of the World (2005)
- Kong: Escape from Skull Island (2005)
- Crave (2010)
- Sacrifice (2011)
- Sanctuary Bay (2016)
- I Do Not Trust You (2018)
