= Affinity (sociology) =

Term in sociology

Affinity in terms of sociology, refers to "kinship of spirit", interest and other interpersonal commonalities. Affinity is characterized by high levels of intimacy and sharing, usually in close groups, also known as affinity groups. It differs from affinity in law and Catholic canon law which generally refer to the marriage relationship. Social affinity is generally thought of as "marriage" to ideas, ideals and causes shared by a tight community of people.

== Theories ==
In Social affinity in a modern world, Boston College professor, James Allan Vela-McConnell explores the emergence of the concept of "social affinity" bridging classical sociology and social psychology, identifying "the notion of social cohesion" based upon the sentiment of moral obligation.

Max Weber articulated "Elective Affinities".

== Examples ==
Affinity is shown or demonstrated by an individual identifying with a subculture, ethnicity, or other groups, within a larger national culture. Self-identification with a group is a valid form of expressing affinity.
