= Roswell High =

Young adult book series by Melinda Metz

- Original cover for The Outsider
- TheShades, Skeletons in the Closet, Dreamwalk, Roswell: A New Beginning, Nightscape, Pursuit, Turnabout
- Author: Melinda Metz
- Country: United States
- Language: English
- Genre: Science fiction, young adult
- Publisher: Pocket Books
- Published: 1998–2000
- Media type: Print (paperback)

Roswell High is a young adult book series written by Melinda Metz and published by Pocket Books. The ten-book series chronicles the adventures of three teen aliens and their human friends, who attend the fictional Ulysses F. Olsen High in Roswell, New Mexico. The Roswell High books served as inspiration for the American science fiction television series Roswell (1999–2002), also known as Roswell High in some countries, which in turn spawned eleven spin-off books of its own and the most recent adaptation Roswell, New Mexico (2019).

== Premise ==
Max Evans, his sister Isabel, and their friend Michael Guerin appear to be human but are in reality the survivors of the 1947 UFO crash known as the Roswell UFO incident. Upon emerging from stasis pods, they appeared to be seven-year-old orphaned humans. Max and Isabel are adopted by a loving pair of attorneys, the Evans', while Michael entered the foster care system, bouncing from household to household with many families rejecting him.

The aliens have special powers, including the ability to:

- rearrange molecules (change objects, heal injuries).
- "dreamwalk" (observe, participate in, and manipulate others' dreams).
- sense each other's emotions from afar.
- create psychic connections that allow the alien to see into another's mind.
- perceive colorful halos or auras around humans that indicate emotional state.

Max, Isabel, and Michael have successfully kept their true nature a secret for a decade. The series begins with the accidental shooting of Liz Ortecho, a human friend of Max's. He cannot bear to see her die and risks bringing attention to himself when he uses his powers to save her life. Liz is soon let in on the secret, as are her friends Maria DeLuca and Alex Manes. The six teens quickly bond and learn to trust one another, and Max and Liz fall deeply in love, and Michael and Maria fall in love. Together the group fends off the suspicions of law enforcement and alien hunters while seeking clues about the aliens' origins.

== Characters ==
The Roswell High novels focus on three alien-human hybrids – Max Evans, his sister Isabel, and their friend Michael Guerin – and the human classmates who become their allies after Max reveals his powers by saving Liz Ortecho's life. Together they navigate high school, romance, and repeated confrontations with Sheriff Jim Valenti's secretive anti-alien program, Project Clean Slate, while searching for answers about their origins on another world.

=== Aliens ===
- Max Evans – A quiet, academically successful senior who has secretly loved Liz since childhood. After he heals her gunshot wound at the Crashdown Café, he becomes the reluctant leader of the group as they evade Project Clean Slate and learn to use their powers responsibly.
- Isabel Evans – Max's confident sister, a popular cheerleader whose social life masks her fear of exposure. Her relationships with human classmate Alex Manes and fellow alien Nikolas Branson force her to choose between human attachments and alien loyalties.
- Michael Guerin – Hot‑tempered and impulsive, Michael grew up in multiple foster homes (the Salingers, the Hughes, and the Pascals) and struggles with authority. His connection to Maria DeLuca and later Cameron Winger, along with the discovery of his brother Trevor, pushes him to accept both found family on Earth and ties to his homeworld.
- Ray Iburg – An adult survivor of the 1947 crash who runs the local UFO museum. He becomes a mentor in helping the teens understand their abilities and the Stones of Midnight, and dies during a mission against Project Clean Slate.
- Nikolas Branson – A fourth hybrid who emerged from the pods earlier and was raised in California. His reckless use of power and contempt for humans draw Isabel into a dangerous romance that ends with his death during a confrontation with Sheriff Valenti at the mall.
- Adam – A hybrid raised inside Valenti's Clean Slate compound and subjected to intensive experimentation. Despite his childlike manner and brief bond with Liz, he is manipulated into killing Valenti and dies before the final battle with the alien stowaway DuPris.
- Trevor – Michael's older brother from the aliens' homeworld, who arrives on Earth through a wormhole opened by a Stone of Midnight. He claims to represent a rebel faction in the collective consciousness and ultimately returns through the wormhole to help rebuild their world.

=== Humans ===
- Liz Ortecho – A top student and Max's biology lab partner, whose shooting at the Crashdown triggers the entire story. After learning the truth about Max, Isabel, and Michael, she becomes their most committed human ally and maintains a complicated romance with Max across all ten books.
- Maria DeLuca – Liz's outspoken best friend, raised by a single mother and fiercely protective of the people she loves. Her on‑again, off‑again relationship with Michael, brief psychic experiences via an alien ring, and the kidnapping of her little brother Kevin keep her tightly bound to the aliens' battles.
- Alex Manes – A loyal, tech‑savvy friend of Liz and Maria from a strict military family (father "the Major," brothers Robert, Harry, and Jesse). He becomes Isabel's boyfriend, is accidentally sent through a wormhole to the home planet, and later returns changed, playing a key role in saving her life.
- Kyle Valenti – Sheriff Valenti's son and Liz's ex‑boyfriend, who grows increasingly unstable as he learns fragments of the truth. His attempt to expose the aliens to the media and his kidnapping of Maria's brother lead to his confinement in a mental institution by the end of the series.
- Jim Valenti – The sheriff of Roswell and head of Project Clean Slate, a covert operation that captures, studies, and weaponizes aliens. His pursuit of Max's group and his experiments on Michael and Adam drive much of the early conflict until Adam kills him during the Clean Slate uprising.
- Cameron Winger – A teenage operative (short red hair, about 5'10") recruited by Valenti to spy on Michael and Adam inside the Clean Slate compound. She falls in love with Michael, ultimately betrays Valenti to help the group escape, and later returns to assist them in their fight against DuPris.

=== Aura and connection traits ===
In the novels, alien hybrids and certain humans perceive colored auras and associated scents when forming deep psychic connections. These auras and scents are used in‑story to signal emotional states and bonds between characters.

Character	Species	Aura (name)	Aura (sample)	Connection scent
Max Evans	Alien–human hybrid	Emerald green	Emerald green	Cedar
Isabel Evans	Alien–human hybrid	Royal purple	Royal purple	Cinnamon
Michael Guerin	Alien–human hybrid	Brick red	Brick red	Eucalyptus
Liz Ortecho	Human	Amber	Amber	Ylang-ylang
Maria DeLuca	Human	Ocean blue	Ocean blue	Roses
Alex Manes	Human	Bright orange	Bright orange	Almonds
Nikolas Branson	Alien–human hybrid	Gold	Gold	Not specified
Adam	Alien–human hybrid	Bright yellow	Bright yellow	Fresh leaves
Cameron Winger	Human	Olive green	Olive green	Ocean
Ray Iburg	Alien	Creamy white	Creamy white	Not specified
Trevor	Alien	Magenta	Magenta	Not specified

== Development ==
Pocket Books created the core idea for the Roswell High series. Metz and her writing partner Laura J. Burns created the basic story arc for the first six books, after which several writers wrote the sample scene in which Max saves Liz's life. Metz was chosen to write the books, and she and Burns worked together to further develop the series.

In a 2001 interview with Crashdown.com (a Roswell Fansite), Metz and Burns explained their creative process:

It’s hard for people to see my work because all my book publishing work was behind the scenes, as an editor. When Melinda and I met, we were both editors at a book production company, which works the way a movie or a TV production company would work here–you come up with the ideas, you do the plotting, you hire the writers, and you have a deal with the publishing house, as opposed to with the network. The publishing house would pay for the printing of the books, the distribution and advertising, that kind of thing. As an editor at that type of company, you have a lot more creative input than you would at a large publishing house, where editors tend to buy finished manuscripts rather than coming up with the ideas themselves.

It was funny, we were assigned to work on a series called "Fear Street" together, which was an R.L. Stine series. [...] We started working together, and we realized right away that we were on the same creative wavelength. And after that no one could get us to work separately! We were plotting books, and it’s so much easier to work at a plot if you’re doing it with somebody else than if you’re sitting alone in a room.

Basically we wound up working together conceptually. It got to the point where it was so much easier to do our jobs together that we sort of stuck together even when we weren’t officially assigned to. After I left the company where we met, I was developing the "Roswell High" series for Pocket Books. Melinda, at that time, was making the jump to full-time writer. So I was able to bring her on after I had developed the characters, the story arcs and the tone of the series.

It was perfect because I could hire Melinda and we could keep working together, which was great and, I think, just good timing. It was perfect for both of us.

— Laura J Burns

Yeah, Laura had already come up with the characters of Max and Liz, Michael and Maria, Alex and Isabel and Valenti and the arc for the first six books. Then together we fleshed out the individual plots for the books–although Laura had all the initial stuff. But we got to do what we used to do, which is sit around and brainstorm and figure out stuff together, which is fun.

— Melinda Metz

== Books ==
=== The Outsider (1998) ===
When Liz Ortecho is shot in a freak accident at the Crashdown Cafe owned by her family, her friend Max Evans leaps in to heal her without regard for the secret that he keeps about his sister Isabel, his friend Michael Guerin, and himself. Though Liz withdraws from Max when she finds out that they are aliens, she slowly realizes that Max loves her and poses no danger to her. Liz keeps his secret from Sheriff Valenti and the publisher of the local tabloid, DuPris, despite their suspicions. But she tells her best friend, Maria DeLuca. Maria can't handle this by herself so she tells Alex. The six of them figure out a way to put aside their fears and trust each other. At the end, Liz realizes that she returns Max's love, but he pushes her away because he believes that he is endangering her by being in her life.

=== The Wild One (1998) ===
Max, Michael, and Isabel agree not to use their powers any more. But after a new guy, Nikolas, comes to town, strange events happen. Michael soon realizes Nikolas is one of them, the fourth alien who also came out of the pods. Nikolas left his pod first and moved to California after being adopted. He doesn't understand why Max, Michael, and Isabel don't use their powers and are afraid of the alien hunters.

Max gets hired at the UFO Museum. Sheriff Valenti is suspicious about the recent strange occurrences. Therefore, he interrogates Liz. Liz takes Max and go after Nikolas, who is accompanied by Isabel. They start a fight. Isabel keeps defending her new boyfriend. Angry, Nikolas touches and seriously hurts Liz. While Max heals her, Nikolas and Isabel take off. Max, Michael, Liz, Maria and Alex are led by Sheriff Valenti to the mall. Isabel and Nikolas must be there. Isabel has just knocked the guard down with her power when they arrive. Max and Liz stick together. Almost caught by the sheriff, they share a passionate kiss. Valenti finds the couple first and fires a shot at Nikolas. Before getting to Isabel, Liz distracts him. Isabel, Max, and the others are now all right, but Valenti has caught Liz. Then Ray Iburg appears and sends Valenti a kiss good night. Liz is free. Max is relieved. Ray admits he's also an alien.

=== The Seeker (1999) ===
After Nikolas was killed in the mall, Isabel suffered an emotional breakdown. Alex stood by her and brought her back. As a result, she started appreciating her life and promised she'd never use her powers. Max told Liz their kiss from the mall meant nothing and he wished he stayed away from her. Liz was hurt and started dating a guy from school. Ray began teaching Max and Michael how to do things with their power. He also explained that their ship was crashed by a stowaway who had stolen a powerful ring. Maria and Michael start doing things together. At first, they thought they were just friends, but then they realize it was much more than that. They kiss. Maria thinks she has psychic abilities because she gets flashes of certain things. In the end, after Maria is almost killed but Michael risks his life for her, Ray tells them it was a manipulation of some alien bounty hunters who were looking for the alien ring Maria had taken from the mall. Finally Ray takes the ring and hides it.

=== The Watcher (1999) ===
Max is hit by an alien phase. Ray explains that it is called akino and is usual back on their home planet. Every teenager contracts it when he or she reaches maturity. The problem is, Max will die unless he is healed by crystals from their planet, crystals that are on their spaceship. Max soon loses weight, strength, and his powers. Michael, Alex, Isabel, Maria, and Liz help Max find the ship, which Valenti and his Project Clean Slate have. They plan a dangerous escape in order to recover the crystals. Liz supports Max, and they decide that if he survives, they can become more than friends. Michael, Isabel and Ray go to the secret location of the spaceship. Ray is killed, and Michael is captured. Only Isabel comes back with the crystals.

=== The Intruder (1999) ===
Max is saved, but Ray is dead, and Michael is Valenti's prisoner. After three days, a boy comes to the Evanses. He proves to be the fifth alien from the pods and was raised in captivity by Valenti. His name is Adam. He seems to be acting like an 8-year-old boy but in fact his power is stronger because it had been developed by the sheriff's Clean Slate Project. He also forms a crush on Liz. A few days later, Max, Liz, Isabel, Maria, Alex, and Adam go to the compound to rescue Michael. Adam leads them straight to Valenti's office. Adam kills the sheriff and then tries to kill Max. Then he starts a huge fire. Max, Liz, Isabel, Alex, and Maria take Michael and his prison companion, Cameron, out of the compound. Valenti is dead. They are all safe now.

=== The Stowaway (2000) ===
The gang tries to figure out Adam, whether he is evil or not, and what to do about him. Michael has fallen for Cameron and she for him (Maria is upset over it), and they fight when he discovers the truth about her. Cameron leaves town but comes back to the gang just in time to rescue them.

Eventually the teens discover that the local UFO newspaper publisher is the evil stowaway that they were told crashed the ship all those years ago and that he was remote controlling Adam when Clean Slate was destroyed. This guy can teleport, and Max learns to do so as well. DuPris (the bad alien) has searched for 50 years for one of the three Stones of Midnight the homeworld has as a power source, and he gets the ring (containing one) the gang has. The gang tries to send DuPris to his enemies through a wormhole, adopting his appearance as part of their efforts. They send him through with the bounty hunters but discover that it was Alex they sent through, and the real DuPris escapes with the ring.

=== The Vanished (2000) ===
Cameron has left town. Michael has found that Ray (the friendly alien) left him the ownership of the museum in his will so he's got a place of his own now.

The gang investigates DuPris' office and discovers a photograph of Alex's father with Valenti showing that he's also in Clean Slate. They try to recover the ship from the Clean Slate ruins but flee when they see someone coming; later it's gone.

Maria suggests that DuPris may have hidden the ship in Carlsbad Caverns. Meanwhile, Max gets mixed signals from the consciousness about Alex (he's afraid, some are curious about him, some want him dead).

During their trip to the Caverns, the teens find the ship hidden in the cave and run into a chemical weapon trap set by Mr. Manes, deadly to aliens- Liz and Maria drag their friends to safety. They have a confrontation with DuPris, discovering that Mr. Manes isn't an enemy as he saves them with more gas after being trapped in the ship with them. DuPris teleports the ship away, and an attempt by Mr. Manes to bring Alex home using a Clean Slate device that absorbed Stone energy fails.

=== The Rebel (2000) ===
Alex has returned to Earth through a wormhole and thinks someone/something evil followed him. Michael meets a stranger outside the museum, and it turns out to be his unknown brother who slipped through with Alex.

Most of the book is spent with everyone trying to decide who should be trusted, mostly thinking that Trevor (Michael's brother) might be a danger. Alex thinks he might want the Stone that he used to get home. Kyle Valenti seems like a villain as he kidnaps Maria's brother Kevin.

=== The Dark One (2000) ===
Starts where #8 left us with Kyle confronting the gang and Michael's brother Trevor appearing to join up with the evil alien DuPris. They get Maria's brother Kevin back and spend much of the rest of the book dealing with DuPris and the fact that Isabel has developed the dangerous akino condition.

Max wants her to join the collective consciousness while Michael and Isabel herself do not. Supposedly DuPris is the leader of the rebel faction wanting to destroy the consciousness with the Stones of Midnight. Trevor claims that the condition is survivable without merging. He is telling the truth, although it takes the use of a Stone to do it.

DuPris is killed in a battle. The Stones are necessary to survive akino and to destroy the collective consciousness, and the gang now has two of the three stones their world had.

Now they've got to save Max- he's now so caught up in the consciousness that he can no longer get out.

=== The Salvation (2000) ===
The Salvation opens with Adam's funeral. Max is lost to the consciousness, in a comatose state. Michael has two of the three Stones of Midnight. Alex, Isabel, and Liz reach out to Max while trying to hide the true aim of the group from the consciousness. Michael, Trevor, and Maria attempt to find a way to shatter the consciousness without hurting Max. Michael and Trevor bond as brothers. Isabel and Trevor are attracted to each other. Michael realized he loves Maria - but as he believes that he will be leaving Earth with his brother, he goes into operation 'Cold Turkey' to prevent Maria from going through a withdrawal stage as he did with Cameron. Liz keeps trying to get through to Max. The group finally figure out a way to shatter the consciousness. They use the Stones of Midnight in their possession to open a wormhole to the alien planet. The consciousness has the third Stone of Midnight. Using a device they get from Kyle Valenti (who is now in a mental asylum for saying that aliens killed his father), they neutralize that Stone. This disperses all the auras, including those of Michael's parents and Ray Iburg. Max is dispersed into his molecules too - but Liz connects with him and brings him back. Trevor returns to his home planet through the wormhole to rebuild a new world order. Isabel decides not to go with him because her family is on Earth. Michael can't leave Maria behind and confesses his love to her. The group is reunited happily at the end.
