= Melinda Metz =

American author of young adult books (born 1962)

- Born: March 7, 1962 (age 64); San Jose, California, U.S.
- Education: San Jose State University
- Occupation: Novelist
- Writing career
- Genres: Young adult literature, science fiction
- Website: www.melindaandlaura.com

Melinda Metz (born March 7, 1962) is an American author of young adult books as well as a series for adults. Her series Roswell High, about teenage aliens, serves as the basis of The WB television series Roswell and The CW television series Roswell, New Mexico.

== Career ==
Metz's Roswell High series was published from 1998 to 2000 and consists of ten books. Her series Fingerprints, about a psychic girl who reads thoughts from fingerprints, was published from 2001 to 2002 and consists of seven books.

Metz has also edited and written books for several book series, including Buffy the Vampire Slayer, The New Adventures of Mary-Kate and Ashley Olsen, Ghosts of Fear Street, and Goosebumps Presents. She sometimes collaborates with fellow author Laura J. Burns, with whom she wrote the book series based on the Everwood TV series, and the Wright and Wong teen detective series, and the Vampire Beach series under the pseudonym of Alex Duval. Metz was also the ghostwriter for two books in the Animorphs series.

== Works ==
=== Roswell High ===
Roswell High is a young adult book series written by Melinda Metz and published by Pocket Books. The 10-book series chronicles the adventures of three teen aliens and their human friends, who attend the fictional Ulysses F. Olsen High in Roswell, New Mexico. The Roswell High books served as inspiration for the television series Roswell (1999–2002), also known as Roswell High in some countries, which in turn spawned a number of spin-off books of its own. The second adaptation was re-imagining for the television series Roswell, New Mexico.

Book list

1. The Outsider
2. The Wild One
3. The Seeker
4. The Watcher
5. The Intruder
6. The Stowaway
7. The Vanished
8. The Rebel
9. The Dark One
10. The Salvation

=== Fingerprints ===
Fingerprints is a young adult supernatural thriller series by Melinda Metz, first published in the early 2000s. The series follows high school student Rachel "Rae" Voight, who develops a psychic ability to hear thoughts and emotions when she touches objects with fingerprints on them, drawing her into mysteries involving a stalker determined to kill her.

==== Premise ====
After a near-fatal incident, Rae discovers she can hear fragments of thoughts and emotions when she touches glass or other smooth surfaces bearing fingerprints. At first she questions her sanity, but the messages begin to coalesce into warnings that someone close to her wants her dead and may be responsible for dangerous events around her. With help from classmates Anthony, who takes her ability seriously, and Yana, who supports her without pressing for details, Rae uses her gift to uncover secrets and piece together who is targeting her while balancing family conflict, school life and a developing romance.

==== Publication history ====
The series was released as a paperback young adult line over multiple volumes in the early 2000s. Online catalogues list the books in the following order:

1. Gifted Touch (c. 2001)
2. Haunted
3. Trust Me
4. Secrets
5. Betrayed
6. Revelations
7. Payback
8. Burned
9. Shockwaves (sometimes listed as Shocked)
10. Touched

The books were published as mass-market paperbacks in English-language markets by commercial young adult imprints working with Alloy Entertainment as book packager. Reference works on Metz group the series within the children’s and teen catalogues of major publishers such as HarperCollins and Simon & Schuster.

==== Themes ====
Series descriptions highlight that Fingerprints combines paranormal elements with suspense and mystery, using Rae's ability as a device to uncover secrets and crimes involving her classmates and family. The premise raises questions about privacy and the burden of unwanted knowledge, as Rae's power effectively turns ordinary objects into sources of involuntary confession and isolates her from people who doubt her experiences. The books also use the psychic storyline as a metaphor for adolescence, with Rae's heightened sensitivity to others' secrets reflecting the emotional intensity and ethical dilemmas of teenage life.

==== Television adaptation ====
In interviews about her young adult work, Metz has noted that Alloy Entertainment developed several of her series concepts with potential television adaptations in mind, including Fingerprints, following the success of Roswell High as the basis for the television drama Roswell. Development did not result in a produced or broadcast television series based on Fingerprints, and the story has so far remained solely in novel form.

=== Other ===
- Animorphs #29: The Sickness (Ghostwritten) (1999)
- Animorphs #34: The Prophecy (Ghostwritten) (1999)
- Case of the Creepy Castle (2000)
- Raven's Point (2004)
- Talk to the Paw (2018)
- The Secret Life of Mac (2019)

==== With Laura J. Burns ====
- "Abomination, Beauport, Brittany, France, 1320" in Tales of the Slayer, Vol. 2 (2003)
- Buffy the Vampire Slayer: Apocalypse Memories (2004)
- Buffy the Vampire Slayer: Colony (2005)
- Everwood: First Impressions (2004)
- Everwood: Making Choices (2004)
- Everwood: Worlds Apart (2005)
- Everwood: Change of Plans (2005)
- Wright and Wong
- Crave
- Sacrifice
- I Do Not Trust You
