= List of Royal Pains episodes =

Royal Pains is a medical comedy-drama television series that premiered on USA Network on June 4, 2009. The series stars Mark Feuerstein an unfairly discredited but brilliant diagnostic surgeon, moves to The Hamptons and becomes a reluctant concierge doctor to the rich and famous. A Royal Pains two-hour movie aired on Sunday, December 16, 2012. In November 2014, the network renewed the series for seasons 7 and 8, with each season consisting of eight episodes. The seventh season premiered on June 2, 2015. The eighth and final season began on May 18, 2016, and ended on July 6, 2016.

== Series overview ==
Season	Episodes	Originally released	
Season	Episodes	First released	Last released
1	12	June 4, 2009	August 27, 2009
2	18	June 3, 2010	February 24, 2011
3	16	June 29, 2011	February 22, 2012
4	16	June 6, 2012	December 16, 2012
5	13	June 12, 2013	September 11, 2013
6	13	June 10, 2014	September 2, 2014
7	8	June 2, 2015	July 21, 2015
8	8	May 18, 2016	July 6, 2016

== Episodes ==
=== Season 1 (2009) ===
No. overall	No. in season	Title	Directed by	Written by	Original release date	Prod. code	U.S. viewers (millions)
1	1	"Pilot"	Jace Alexander	Story by : John P. Rogers & Andrew Lenchewski; Teleplay by : Andrew Lenchewski	June 4, 2009	RP#100	5.57
After the death of a hospital benefactor, Hank Lawson, a young brilliant diagnostic surgeon becomes discredited and blacklisted, he slips into a slump which cost him his place and his new fiancé, Hank and his brother head to the Hamptons for a weekend of fun, but after an emergency occurs that required his medical assistance, he gets an offer to be a concierge doctor for the summer.
2	2	"There Will Be Food"	Don Scardino	Michael Rauch	June 11, 2009	RP#103	5.6
A 27-year-old ballerina (Gillian Jacobs) is retiring, and HankMed is invited to her party. After reintroducing junk food to her diet, she begins losing consciousness due to deglutition syncope. Meanwhile, Hank takes the case of a fisherman (Michael Mulheren) with hepatitis C. HankMed runs into some trouble after Hank meets Tucker's (Ezra Miller) father (Andrew McCarthy).
3	3	"Strategic Planning"	Jace Alexander	Andrew Lenchewski	June 18, 2009	RP#102	6.50
HankMed treats Kendrick (Aaron Dean Eisenberg), the son of a wealthy senator whose mother (Margaret Colin) has his life planned for him. Meanwhile, Evan and some friends get folliculitis from a hot tub. Evan tries to gain clients for HankMed, including Ms. Newberg (Christine Ebersole).
4	4	"TB or Not TB"	Constantine Makris	Constance M. Burge	June 25, 2009	RP#104	5.94
The head chef (Callie Thorne) of a prominent Hamptons restaurant begins having strokes. Hank tries to save her from long-term damage, but she goes missing before treatment is administered. Valentina, a restaurant employee, has a false positive reaction to a TB test, because she received a BCG vaccine in Italy. Meanwhile, Hank and Jill have a date on what would have been Hank's wedding day.
5	5	"No Man is an Island"	Don Scardino	Carol Flint	July 9, 2009	RP#105	5.73
Hank is taken to a technology-free private island when a woman, Claire Grant (Susan Misner) wants to give birth there. Meanwhile, the island's caretaker Will (James Rebhorn) has a car accident and gets a compound fracture. Hank uses a drill to relieve Will's brain hematoma. 12-year-old Arlo provides a transfusion. Hank turns down Jill's job offer.
6	6	"If I Were A Sick Man"	Dennie Gordon	Jon Sherman	July 16, 2009	RP#106	6.23
When Ms. Newberg (Christine Ebersole) throws a "bark mitzvah" for her dog Koufax, many of the guests begin showing similar symptoms. Koufax has an empyema in his lungs, and has MRSA. Hank quarantines the guests in the house. Meanwhile, Evan makes a surprising discovery about Divya's personal life. Tucker (Ezra Miller) is worried that Libby (Meredith Hagner) may be cheating on him. A grateful Ms. Newberg sends a gift.
7	7	"Crazy Love"	Bronwen Hughes	Jessica Ball	July 23, 2009	RP#107	6.21
Hank and Divya treat Sofia (Roselyn Sanchez) who was in a car accident. Sofia's injuries are far worse than initially believed. Her husband Javier is worried, and broke, Meanwhile, Raj (Rupak Ginn) visits the Hamptons and Hank discovers that Boris (Campbell Scott) is hiding a dark secret. Katie does marine research. Boris' blood test shows elevated CPK levels.
8	8	"The Honeymoon's Over"	Eric Laneuville	Jason Gavin	July 30, 2009	RP#108	6.38
Divya treats Alan Ryder (Peter Jacobson) a newlywed who tries to hide his illness from his wife Rachel (Brooklyn Decker). Meanwhile, Hank treats Mr. Kingsley (Lee Tergesen) an artist who isn't taking his hypertrophic cardiomyopathy seriously. Hank breaks through the door of the workshop finding Mr. Kingsley on the floor.
9	9	"It's Like Jamais Vu All Over Again"	Michael W. Watkins	Michael Rauch & Constance M. Burge	August 6, 2009	RP#109	6.69
While attending a horse show, Hank treats Beth, a girl who has fallen off a horse, after having tonic clonic seizures. Meanwhile, Divya's father Devesh Katdare (Ajay Mehta) needs medical attention while he and Divya's mother Rubina Katdare (Anna George) are visiting. Divya's parents believe she has an MBA from Wharton, when she is actually a physician's assistant. Jill's estranged husband Charlie Casey (Bruno Campos) returns to the Hamptons.
10	10	"Am I Blue?"	Jay Chandrasekhar	Jon Sherman & Carol Flint	August 13, 2009	RP#110	5.56
Boris donates money to the clinic and Jill has second thoughts. Evan becomes friends with a Polish woman, whose photosensitive skin turns blue from a day at the beach due to a drug reaction. Tucker's (Ezra Miller) father (Andrew McCarthy) hires Hank in order to "rapid detox", but is angered when Hank refuses. Meanwhile, Charlie (Bruno Campos) continues to annoy Jill, and HankMed discovers that Boris (Campbell Scott) has fled to New York.
11	11	"Nobody's Perfect"	Ken Girotti	Jessica Ball & Michael Rauch	August 20, 2009	RP#111	5.32
Hank discovers that the Gardner family is attempting to take his medical license. Meanwhile, Divya and Evan are summoned to the yacht of an anonymous millionaire fugitive. A sail boom falls on the yacht's captain, causing a flail chest and paradoxical breathing. Divya and Evan, guided by Hank online while at the Gardner's hearing, help the captain. Jill tries to convince Charlie (Bruno Campos) to sign divorce papers. Boris gives Hank his medical history.
12	12	"Wonderland"	Jace Alexander	Andrew Lenchewski	August 27, 2009	RP#112	5.90
The owner (Alexandra Holden) of Divya and Raj's (Rupak Ginn) engagement party venue begins having hallucinations while Divya begins dreaming about a different life. Meanwhile, Charlie (Bruno Campos) moves back in with Jill and Evan makes an enormous financial mistake.

=== Season 2 (2010–11) ===
No. overall	No. in season	Title	Directed by	Written by	Original release date	Prod. code	U.S. viewers (millions)
13	1	"Spasticity"	Constantine Makris	Andrew Lenchewski	June 3, 2010	RP#201	5.84
Dr. Blair (Marcia Gay Harden), who mentored Jill, tries to have her fired. A son tries to break free from his inventor father but his way of doing things turns out to be dangerous. Meanwhile, Hank and Evan come face-to-face with their father, Eddie (Henry Winkler), for the first time in years.
14	2	"Lovesick"	Allison Liddi-Brown	Michael Rauch	June 10, 2010	RP#202	5.60
Ms. Newberg's (Christine Ebersole) heartbroken stepdaughter (Mary Lynn Rajskub) is hospitalized. Divya tries to add some excitement to her relationship with Raj (Rupak Ginn).
15	3	"Keeping the Faith"	Dennis Smith	Jack Bernstein & Michael Rauch	June 17, 2010	RP#203	5.51
Hank and Evan learn that Eddie is now living in the Hamptons. HankMed's latest case is a movie star (The Big Show) who collapses.
16	4	"Medusa"	Matthew Penn	Andrew Lenchewski & Constance M. Burge	June 24, 2010	RP#204	5.30
Hank accompanies Boris (Campbell Scott) out of the country for some gene therapy research, where he meets Boris' secret girlfriend (Paola Turbay). Meanwhile, Divya is irritated by Hank's temporary replacement (Anastasia Griffith).
17	5	"Mano a Mano"	Matthew Penn	Carol Flint & Jon Sherman	July 1, 2010	RP#205	5.32
Boris' (Campbell Scott) experimental treatments leave Hank scrambling to save his life. Meanwhile, Divya and Dr. Peck (Anastasia Griffith) aren't finding it easy to work together.
18	6	"In Vino Veritas"	Michael W. Watkins	Jessica Ball	July 15, 2010	RP#206	5.20
Tucker (Ezra Miller) suspects that his best friend has a problem with drugs and alcohol, but Hank is able to diagnose a medical condition causing his problems. Divya meets a woman who works at the vineyard where the episode takes place and determines the cause of her ageusia.
19	7	"Comfort's Overrated"	Ed Fraiman	Constance M. Burge	July 22, 2010	RP#207	5.28
Hank goes head-to-head with Emily Peck (Anastasia Griffith) treating a patient (Peter Strauss), who despite having a shin injury, begins losing his vision. Evan, meanwhile, is approached by the patient's girlfriend (Brooke D'Orsay) with a bizarre proposition, while Divya treats a couple whose marriage has spontaneously collapsed, leading to an odd medical answer to their troubles.
20	8	"The Hankover"	Jay Chandrasekhar	Carol Flint & Jon Sherman	July 29, 2010	RP#208	5.01
Hank treats an old bully (Michael B. Silver) of his who doesn't seem to remember him. Divya and Jill have a hen's night, while Evan throws a bachelor party to ascertain Raj's (Rupak Ginn) loyalties to Divya.
21	9	"Frenemies"	Wendey Stanzler	Jack Bernstein	August 5, 2010	RP#209	5.53
Jill's struggle for the free clinic against Dr. Blair (Marcia Gay Harden) continues, but the situation becomes complex when her estranged husband calls Hank to treat their son. Evan attempts to fit in with Paige's (Brooke D'Orsay) family (Bob Gunton and Lisa Banes), and Hank and Dr. Peck's (Anastasia Griffith) relationship develops.
22	10	"Whole Lotto Love"	Tawnia McKiernan	Michael Rauch & Jessica Ball	August 12, 2010	RP#210	5.39
The team treat a lottery-winning couple who seem to have been struck with the "lottery curse". Divya treats a kidney-transplanted housekeeper while trying to ignore her budding attraction to her patient's employer (Patrick Heusinger).
23	11	"Big Whoop"	Michael W. Watkins	Michael Rauch & Contance M. Burge	August 19, 2010	RP#211	5.27
Tensions grows between Hank and Emily (Anastasia Griffith) when they care for a patient (John Amos) together but disagree on the course of treatment. Evan concocts a cyber retaliation plan against Emily, who has managed to direct web traffic to her site.
24	12	"Open Up Your Yenta Mouth and Say Ah"	Ken Whittingham	Andrew Lenchewski	August 26, 2010	RP#212	6.08
Hank attempts to deal with a talkative socialite, whose indistinct condition leaves the whole team confused. Adam (Patrick Heusinger) calls Divya once again with problems of his own. Evan attempts to unravel the mystery of Eddie's covert meetings.
25	13	"Mulligan"	Michael Rauch	Michael Rauch & Jon Sherman	January 20, 2011	RP#213	4.43
On the green at the hospital's golf charity drive, Hank tries to help a golfer (Tom Cavanagh) with a hooked hand, while Jill begins to succumb to an exhausting condition. Boris (Campbell Scott) tries to decide how to deal with Eddie, and Divya strains her professional and personal life because of Adam (Patrick Heusinger)
26	14	"Pit Stop"	Matthew Penn	Story by : Simran Baidwan, Jack Bernstein & Jessica Ball; Teleplay by : Jack Bernstein & Jessica Ball	January 27, 2011	RP#214	4.34
Jill's backyard is overtaken by jetsetting reality TV show stars, whose various health problems are complicated by the 24-hour cameras. Dr. Peck (Anastasia Griffith) returns with a new deal, while Marissa (Paola Turbay) tries to keep her pregnancy and career under control.
27	15	"A History of Violins"	Dennie Gordon	Story by : Alex Douglas, Jon Sherman & Carol Flint; Teleplay by : Jon Sherman & Carol Flint	February 3, 2011	RP#215	3.87
HankMed treats an aspiring singer. Meanwhile, Evan overhears General Collins' (Bob Gunton) plans for his Senate campaign, and Divya continues to worry about her emotional investment in Adam (Patrick Heusinger). Meanwhile, Dr. Peck (Anastasia Griffith) becomes Eddie's physician, which upsets Hank.
28	16	"Astraphobia"	Ed Fraiman	Andrew Lenchewski & Stuart Feldman	February 10, 2011	RP#216	3.86
With the storm of the year bearing down on the Hamptons, HankMed continues to search for Divya's replacement, while treating a park ranger (Jim Gaffigan) who was struck by lightning. Divya treats a storm chaser (Jaime Ray Newman) whose high-risk lifestyle is at odds with her condition.
29	17	"Fight or Flight"	Michael Rauch	Story by : Aubrey Villalobos, Michael Rauch & Constance M. Burge; Teleplay by : Michael Rauch & Constance M. Burge	February 17, 2011	RP#217	3.89
A year after a stock trader's (Julianne Nicholson) friend dies in the emergency room, due to a brain aneurysm, she begins to feel similar symptoms—which is concerning for her literal high-flying lifestyle. Raj's (Rupak Ginn) lateness for his wedding party for their American friends forces him to reveal a problem with the company, and Evan bites off more than he can chew while trying to deal with Paige's (Brooke D'Orsay) snoring.
30	18	"Listen to the Music"	Constantine Makris	Andrew Lenchewski	February 24, 2011	RP#218	4.05
Hank is worried that his patient had been misdiagnosed twenty years ago, and wants to get to the bottom of the case. Meanwhile, Divya and Raj (Rupak Ginn) take dance lessons in preparation for their wedding, but they end up as patients themselves. Eddie struggles to choose between a life on the run without his boys, or life in a low security prison with a chance to still see them occasionally. Jill is faced with the chance to take a job out of the country, or stay in her current job and maintain the clinic. John Legend guest stars.

=== Season 3 (2011–12) ===
Royal Pains was renewed for a third season of 16 to 18 episodes on September 27, 2010. The season has included two guest appearances by Ed Asner, who played the Lawson brothers' grandfather, Ted Roth. The season also saw the return of Libby (Meredith Hagner) and Jack (Tom Cavanagh). Additional guest stars included Shiri Appleby, Julie Benz, Joanna Gleason, Tony Hale, Greg Jennings, David Rasche, and Molly Sims. The first half of the season, consisting of 10 episodes, concluded on August 31, 2011, while the remaining six episodes began airing on January 18, 2012.

Season 3 episodes
No. overall	No. in season	Title	Directed by	Written by	Original release date	Prod. code	U.S. viewers (millions)
31	1	"Traffic"	Constantine Makris	Andrew Lenchewski	June 29, 2011	RP#301	5.00
With the beginning of summer comes a new group of potential patients, and HankMed wastes no time gaining more clients, beginning with a bus full of injured passengers. Meanwhile, Divya deals with the aftermath of her breakup with Raj, Marissa (Paola Turbay) nearly goes into labor, and Jill and Paige (Brooke D'Orsay) return from overseas, each bringing startling news.
32	2	"But There's a Catch"	Michael Watkins	Michael Rauch	July 6, 2011	RP#302	5.02
Hank is invited to a charity football tournament run by Ken "Killer" Keller (Michael B. Silver). During the tournament, tensions flare and Hank must put his feelings aside to treat an injured Keller.
33	3	"Rash Talk"	Michael Rauch	Constance M. Burge	July 13, 2011	RP#303	4.92
Hank must treat a woman (Shiri Appleby) who blames her sickness on her new line of house-cleaning products.
34	4	"The Shaw/Hank Redemption"	Matthew Penn	Jon Sherman & Carol Flint	July 20, 2011	RP#304	5.03
While on a trip to Florida to attend their father's (Henry Winkler) parole hearing, the Lawson brothers meet their grandfather (Ed Asner) and Hank treats an ex-hacker (Jonathan Tucker). Meanwhile back in the Hamptons, Jill and Divya must deliver Marissa (Paola Turbay) and Boris' (Campbell Scott) baby. Later, while transporting stem cells, Jill is involved in a serious car crash.
35	5	"A Man Called Grandpa"	Matthew Penn	Andrew Lenchewski & Jessica Ball	July 27, 2011	RP#305	4.85
Still in Florida, Hank and Evan try to keep their father (Henry Winkler) out of prison while simultaneously trying to treat a patient (Jonathan Tucker). Meanwhile, Evan tries to get closer to the Lawsons' grandfather (Ed Asner) and Jill attempts to deal with the aftermath of her car crash.
36	6	"An Apple a Day"	Don Scardino	Jack Bernstein	August 3, 2011	RP#306	5.46
Hank treats Libby's (Meredith Hagner) wounded mother (Julie Benz). Meanwhile, Evan proposes to Paige (Brooke D'Orsay), Jill continues to search for the truth behind her crash, and Divya is met with some unwelcome news from Raj (Rupak Ginn).
37	7	"Ta Da For"	Ed Fraiman	Jon Sherman	August 10, 2011	RP#307	5.16
HankMed treats a magician (Tony Hale) while Evan books Hank on The Today Show with Matt Lauer. Meanwhile, Divya is surprised when she is met with hostility after treating a patient at Hamptons Heritage.
38	8	"Run, Hank, Run"	Emile Levisetti	Carol Flint	August 17, 2011	RP#308	5.44
After a champion marathon runner (Autumn Reeser) takes ill while training, she turns to HankMed for assistance. Meanwhile, Boris' condition seems to be worsening as his family tries to poison him.
39	9	"Me First"	Allison Liddi-Brown	Michael Rauch & Constance M. Burge	August 24, 2011	RP#309	5.53
Hank's latest case involves a boy with asthma. Paige's secret comes to light and Evan and Paige break up over the secret. Divya goes on a date with a doctor her first date since Raj, whom she had been promised to since she was 11.
40	10	"A Little Art, A Little Science"	Matthew Penn	Andrew Lenchewski	August 31, 2011	RP#310	5.40
Hank treats Eric Kassabian (Wilmer Valderrama) in his crisis with fainting due to countless encounters with his dream painting. HankMed simultaneously attempts to find treatment for Paige's mother, much to the chagrin of the General, eventually finding the solution with one of Hank's former colleagues (Constance Zimmer). In the meantime, Divya works tirelessly to protect her secret while treating a difficult patient. Jill attempts to find her replacement.
41	11	"A Farewell to Barnes"	Michael Rauch	Jon Sherman & Michael Rauch	January 18, 2012	RP#311	3.26
The HankMed team attends a divorce party. Party planner Julie complains of an upset stomach, but Hank diagnoses her with celiac disease. Hank blames Dr. Paul Van Dyke (Kyle Howard) for a prescription error that may cost Eric Kassabian his life. Meanwhile, Paige tosses convention aside and makes Evan an offer he cannot refuse. Jack (Tom Cavanagh) returns and needs a physical.
42	12	"Some Pig"	Michael Watkins	Jessica Ball	January 25, 2012	RP#312	3.37
Hank has trouble trusting Divya after her medical mistake, while they diagnose members of a band who have neurological issues. Hank diagnoses Jack (Tom Cavanagh) with lupus. Evan has a unique reaction to kissing bugs (Triatominae).
43	13	"My Back to the Future"	Mark Feuerstein	Constance M. Burge & Jack Bernstein	February 1, 2012	RP#313	4.09
Hank begins having problems with his back, causing Evan to ask Dr. Van Dyke to fill in for him. Divya tries to sell off a family treasure. After a car chase, Divya and Jill treat a thief impaled by a pole in his abdomen. Hank gives himself an injection, and has a vision of a funeral.
44	14	"Bottoms Up"	Tricia Brock	Carol Flint & Simran Baidwan	February 8, 2012	RP#314	3.21
A former star Gabe Gleason (Jake Weber) attempts a bold return to the stage doing Shakespeare In The Hamptons. One calamity after another befalls the production. Jack (Tom Cavanagh) tries to delay his treatment. Divya discovers that Raj has moved on so she uses Dr. Van Dyke to impress him. Hank helps a Shakespearean actor with a hiatal hernia. Evan steps in as "Puck" in A Midsummer Night's Dream. Paige finds out about an 8-week opportunity that would take her away to England. Jack delays a very important aspect of his treatment when, instead, he decides to go fishing with Jill.
45	15	"Hank and the Deep Blue Sea"	Jay Chandrasekhar	Michael Rauch & Jessica Ball	February 15, 2012	RP#315	3.17
After weeks of Jack neglecting his illness, the symptoms finally catch up with him. Boris' cousin Claudette Von Jurgens (Judith Godrèche) visit, seeking to mend the family rift and turns to Evan for help. Evan offers help to Divya with breaking free of her financial burden. Jill's teenage nephew, Luke, calls on HankMed when his boss fails to take care of some troubling symptoms. Jack takes a turn for the worse.
46	16	"This One's for Jack"	Emile Levisetti	Andrew Lenchewski	February 22, 2012	RP#316	3.16
Hank struggles to cope with Jack's death. Divya treats a fashion designer who has a Nasal septum deviation and sleep apnea. Hank treats three brothers who insist on making a daring home movie. Evan teams with Boris' cousin Claudette on a SmartShirt product that may help a patient. Hank, Evan, Divya and Jill celebrate Jack's life on the golf course. Hank and Evan have a fight, and Hank quits HankMed.

=== Season 4 (2012) ===
The series was renewed for a sixteen-episode fourth season by USA Network on September 15, 2011. Campbell Scott and Brooke D'Orsay, who play Boris Kuester von Jurgens-Ratenicz and Paige Collins, respectively, joined the main cast. Henry Winkler returned to the series as Eddie R. Lawson, Hank and Evan's father. Ben Shenkman appeared in multiple episodes as Dr. Jeremiah Sacani, Hank's replacement, and then co-doctor, at HankMed. Timothée Chalamet appeared in multiple episodes as Jill's nephew, Luke. Donal Logue appeared in two episodes as Ernie, Jill's brother. Kat Foster appeared in several episodes as Harper Cummings, a doctor Hank is set up with by one of his patients. The first episode was written by series creator Andrew Lenchewski. Alexa Vega appeared in the second episode of the season. Judy Greer appeared in one episode as Veronica Sullivan, a matchmaker who is treated by Hank.

Season 4 episodes
No. overall	No. in season	Title	Directed by	Written by	Original release date	Prod. code	U.S. viewers (millions)
47	1	"After the Fireworks"	Emile Levisetti	Andrew Lenchewski	June 6, 2012	RP#401	3.95
After multiple competitive eaters become sick, Hank and Divya treat them. Evan pursues a new business venture, without Hank. Divya tries to bring Hank and Evan together over dinner. Evan emcees the Hampton Harbor Fest Eat Off. Competitive eater Rosie has an obstruction of the carotid artery, and has foreign accent syndrome. Raj and Karen reveal Karen is pregnant. Evan hires Dr. Paul Van Dyke and Dr. Jeremiah Sacani for HankMed 2.0. Jill has her last day at Hamptons Heritage Hospital.
48	2	"Imperfect Storm"	Emile Levisetti	Michael Rauch	June 13, 2012	RP#402	4.14
Jill's nephew (Timothée Chalamet) is treated by Hank. Evan tries to secure a new client (Alexa Vega). Divya faces a difficult decision.
49	3	"A Guesthouse Divided"	Jay Chandrasekhar	Constance M. Burge & Jack Bernstein	June 20, 2012	RP#403	3.87
Hank and Evan are pitted against each other when pursuing the same opportunity. Hank helps Ken "Killer" Keller. A going-away party is thrown for Jill. Divya tries to help Hank and Evan make amends.
50	4	"Dawn of the Med"	Michael Watkins	Carol Flint & Jon Sherman	June 27, 2012	RP#404	4.18
Hank is hired by a young couple. Eddie (Henry Winkler) returns to try to reconcile Hank and Evan. Divya's mother (Anna George) visits to reconnect with her.
51	5	"You Give Love a Bad Name"	Michael Rauch	Michael Rauch & Jessica Ball	July 11, 2012	RP#405	4.15
A matchmaker (Judy Greer) is Hank and Divya's new patient while Evan attempts to get his staff back in line. Paige prepares to throw a party. Boris' main priority is protecting his family.
52	6	"About Face"	Matthew Penn	Constance M. Burge	July 18, 2012	RP#406	4.25
HankMed treats a country club manager. Evan uses Paige's help and gets the business opportunity he's always wanted.
53	7	"Fools Russian"	Allison Liddi-Brown	Carol Flint	July 25, 2012	RP#407	3.92
A secret meeting in Manhattan involves Hank. An Internet entrepreneur is treated by Evan and Dr. Sacani. Divya and her father, Devesh Katdare, resolve their differences.
54	8	"Manimal"	Mark Feuerstein	Jon Sherman	August 1, 2012	RP#408	2.96
Hank and Divya treat a large-animal veterinarian. Evan and Paige comfort a close friend who has experienced an unexpected loss. Boris is obligated to make accommodations.
55	9	"Business and Pleasure"	Constantine Makris	Andrew Lenchewski & Jeff Drayer	August 15, 2012	RP#409	3.95
During a stakeout at an exotic car event, Hank treats an undercover DEA agent (Kimberly Williams-Paisley) who fears she may have been poisoned with meth.
56	10	"Who's Your Daddy?"	Michael Watkins	Michael Rauch & Jon Sherman	August 22, 2012	RP#410	3.91
Hank's latest patient, an ailing polo team owner (Gary Cole), refuses to stop playing. Divya is having a difficult time with her foray into the dating world. Evan worries about a family dinner meeting with Paige's parents.
57	11	"Dancing With the Devil"	Paulo Costanzo	Story by : Jack Bernstein & Simran Baidwan; Teleplay by : Jack Bernstein	August 29, 2012	RP#411	3.78
A pop star needs HankMed's help while visiting the Hamptons on a tour. Hank meets a pediatrician (Kat Foster) and Divya falls for Rafa (Khotan Fernández), an Argentinian polo player.
58	12	"Hurts Like a Mother"	Tawnia McKiernan	Jessica Ball & Aubrey Karr	September 5, 2012	RP#412	3.59
A romance novelist (Carrie Preston) and her daughter become sick with what appears to be different ailments. Divya's new boyfriend seeks out Jeremiah's medical help.
59	13	"Something Fishy This Way Comes"	Janice Cooke	Michael Rauch & Constance M. Burge	September 12, 2012	RP#413	3.74
Boris asks for Hank's help for Dimitri. Evan and Paige meets a woman who claims to be Paige's biological mother.
60	14	"Sand Legs"	Emile Levisetti	Story by : Andrew Lenchewski & Antonia Ellis; Teleplay by : Andrew Lenchewski	September 19, 2012	RP#414	4.23
Hank has a realization about his relationships; Divya's fling takes a surprising turn.
61	15	"Off-Season Greetings"	Michael Rauch	Part 1: Carol Flint & Jon Sherman; Part 2: Constance M. Burge & Michael Rauch	December 16, 2012	RP#415	3.25
62	16	"Off-Season Greetings"	Michael Rauch	Part 1: Carol Flint & Jon Sherman; Part 2: Constance M. Burge & Michael Rauch	December 16, 2012	RP#416	3.25
Part One: The bachelor and bachelorette parties converge in Las Vegas where Divya's romance leads to a surprising conclusion. Evan feels guilty his cousin Owen, whose money he lost in a bad deal, comes down for the wedding. Trying to help the man's medical condition, Hank faces the effects of his own injuries and runs into an old flame (Emma Caulfield). Part Two: Before Evan and Paige marry, the weather puts a few obstacles in their way along with a surprise. Flashbacks reveal how Hank's own engagement party ended up creating a wedge between him and Evan.

=== Season 5 (2013) ===
Season five of Royal Pains premiered on June 12, 2013. Ben Shenkman (Dr. Jeremiah Sacani) was added as a series regular this season. Frances Conroy guests stars in a multi-episode arc as a wealthy socialite who attempts to prevent HankMed operating in her neighborhood. Laura Benanti appears in multiple episodes as Shelby Shackelford, the VP of Acquisitions of Symphony Health Care Systems, a health care company that buys Hamptons Heritage and attempts to acquire HankMed. Callum Blue joins as a recurring role as Boris' cousin and plays a pivotal part in Boris' story arc. Danny Pudi and Claire Coffee appear in episode four. Jenna Elfman appears in episode eleven as Lacy, a reformed party girl. Henry Winkler reprises his role of Eddie Lawson this season.

Season 5 episodes
No. overall	No. in season	Title	Directed by	Written by	Original release date	Prod. code	U.S. viewers (millions)
63	1	"Hankwatch"	Emile Levisetti	Andrew Lenchewski & Jeff Drayer	June 12, 2013	RP#501	3.68
Hank is allowed to return to work full time, even though Evan and Divya keep an eye on him. Evan and Paige begin house-hunting, and accept an offer to live in Shadow Pond. Jeremiah returns from an extended research trip to Iceland with a beard, and treats Hank. Evan hires a team of six on-call physicians to assist with HankMed's workload. Divya learns that she is pregnant. Blythe Ballard (Frances Conroy), a member of a Hamptons founding family, files a restraining order designed to prevent HankMed from operating at Shadow Pond. Hamptons Heritage is taken over by Symphonia, a hospital management corporation.
64	2	"Blythe Spirits"	Constantine Makris	Michael Rauch	June 19, 2013	RP#502	3.67
Paige and Evan host an open house for the community to combat Blythe Ballard's efforts to force them out. Hank struggles to get back into shape while he cares for a police officer (Brad Beyer) with a problematic daughter (Alexandra Socha) and medical needs of his own. Symphonia offers to buy out HankMed. Divya reveals that a childhood accident should have rendered her unable to conceive. Although Jeremiah has returned to the Hamptons, he is reluctant to be involved in HankMed activities involving Divya.
65	3	"Lawson Translation"	Emile Levisetti	Constance M. Burge	June 26, 2013	RP#503	3.55
With HankMed shut down for 72 hours, Hank travels to Budapest to meet with Miloš about Boris' death. Hank discovers that Boris is alive and hiding from Miloš. Dimitri, Boris' half-brother, dies trying to protect them. Boris wishes to go public, but Hank urges him to be patient. Evan attempts to secure HankMed's base operations with the Village Council but meets considerable resistance from Blythe Ballard. In Savannah, Divya and Jeremiah tour the hospital as relations between them grow tense. Later, they assist Tripp, a baseball player with Pompe disease, a genetic disorder which causes muscle weakness resulting from an enlarged heart. Tripp encourages Jeremiah to tell Divya that he's in love with her. Divya sees a local doctor and is told her pregnancy is viable. She later tells Jeremiah about her pregnancy, and he shaves off his beard.
66	4	"Pregnant Paws"	Ken Whittingham	Simran Baidwan	July 10, 2013	RP#504	3.54
With the announcement of Divya's pregnancy, Evan and Hank attempt to cater to her needs - to an uncomfortable level. Jeremiah treats a pair of fun-loving radio hosts (guest star Danny Pudi), Divya treats a dog trainer (Claire Coffee) and Paige tries to take on an internship.
67	5	"Vertigo"	Michael Watkins	Carol Flint	July 17, 2013	RP#505	3.82
At a musical event at the park, Hank chances upon Officer O'Shea (Brad Beyer) who requires a checkup; Hank diagnoses him with photophobia, uveitis and sarcoidosis. Evan again butts heads trying to upstage Blythe Ballard. Divya treats the conductor, whose rush of inspiration oddly coincides with his loss of balance and sense of time. Paige winds up working with Blythe as part of her art appraisal internship. Blythe packs up a Chagall painting.
68	6	"Can of Worms"	Jay Chandrasekhar	Jon Sherman	July 24, 2013	RP#506	3.58
An injured heckler at one of Evan's campaign events leads to Paige asking her father (Bob Gunton) to help - or halt - Evan's quest for city council. Hank attempts to treat a model (Perrey Reeves) whose slenderness is her brand, and is hampered by her belligerently protective boyfriend. Divya and Jeremiah treat a neighbor whose problem isn't limited to just their house. Shelby shares her experience of medicinal bureaucracy which leads Hank to accept her merger proposal.
69	7	"Chock Full O' Nuts"	Mark Feuerstein	Aubrey Karr	July 31, 2013	RP#507	3.54
'Killer' Keller (Michael B. Silver) begins aggressively negotiating with Shelby over the merger contract on Hank's behalf - though not entirely to his wishes. Evan and Paige have their first fight, and Divya adjusts to renting in Jeremiah's house. The trap in the Hamptons for Miloš is set, but Boris' contacts lose track of him.
70	8	"Hammertime"	Allison Liddi-Brown	Jack Bernstein	August 7, 2013	RP#508	3.60
The Miloš (Callum Blue) conspiracy comes to a close when he lands in the Hamptons for the auction at Shadow Pond. Divya treats an old couple while questioning the state of her personal life and pregnancy.
71	9	"Pins And Needles"	Ed Fraiman	Jessica Ball	August 14, 2013	RP#509	3.21
While treating a florist, Hank and Jeremiah come to conflict over Hank's pain medication and his possible addiction. Evan enlists the help of Divya as a campaign and debate partner, but his doggedness concerns Paige. Boris reflects on the disease he and Miloš share.
72	10	"Game Of Phones"	Matthew Penn	Carol Flint & Jon Sherman	August 21, 2013	RP#510	3.18
The week before Evan's birthday, his giddiness over a surprise party results in him flying to Italy with Divya, where she plans to tell her mother about her pregnancy. Don O'Shea looks for his daughter Molly (Alexandra Socha) when she runs away, with Don's heart problems and Hank's narcotics issues complicating the rescue.
73	11	"Open Invitation"	Joe Collins	Michael Rauch & Jessica Ball	August 28, 2013	RP#511	3.27
In the wake of Don's coma, Hank's pain problems come to the forefront - causing Molly to lose trust in him and Eddie (Henry Winkler) to return to stage an intervention with the help of "sobriety guru" Lacy (Jenna Elfman) - though she isn't without problems of her own. Paige suffers from insecurity over Evan and Divya's friendship.
74	12	"A Trismus Story"	Tawnia McKiernan	Constance M. Burge & Jack Bernstein	September 4, 2013	RP#512	3.62
The council election day finally arrives, with Evan and Blythe still duking it out in any way possible, with an enthusiastic reporter whose jaw problems don't stop her from keeping the cameras rolling. Don is on the road to recovery but the strain on Molly spells more problem for the pair. Jeremiah suffers a crisis of confidence in the fallout of Hank's pain management problems.
75	13	"Bones to Pick"	Michael Rauch	Andrew Lenchewski	September 11, 2013	RP#513	3.75
As summer draws to a close in the Hamptons, everyone has to face uncomfortable truths that threaten the future of HankMed. Jeremiah must navigate his anger towards Hank and his friendship with Divya, Hank has to escape the legal tangle with Symphony and faces a proposal from Boris. Divya realizes she is at the point where her pregnancy can no longer be taken lightly, and with all distractions out of the way, Paige and Evan struggle with how their marriage isn't entirely stable when Paige is invited to work in Paris.

=== Season 6 (2014) ===
On September 25, 2012, Royal Pains was renewed for two additional seasons (seasons 5 and 6). The additional seasons contain 26 episodes in total, 13 episodes per season. Season six premiered on June 10, 2014. Guest stars for season six include, Willa Fitzgerald as Emma, the new-found half sister of Evan and Hank; Ryan McCartan as Cinco, a man who Hank treats that comes into conflict with Emma; Gillian Alexy as Charlotte, a woman Hank meets while in Europe; Patrick Breen as Bob, a therapist who provides marriage counseling to Paige and Evan; Jerry Davidson as Ray Mazzarino, a new HankMed patient who decides to go into business with Evan; Martha Higareda as Viviana, a bartender at a local bar which Jeremiah frequents; and Natalie Hall as Hope, a burlesque dancer who turns to Jeremiah for help when she begins experiencing pain during her act. Cheyenne Jackson guest stars as Sam, a perfumery owner who begins to lose his sense of smell. Khloe Kardashian and Scott Disick appear as themselves in the season finale.

Season 6 episodes
No. overall	No. in season	Title	Directed by	Written by	Original release date	Prod. code	U.S. viewers (millions)
76	1	"Smoke and Mirrors"	Kevin Dowling	Story by : Andrew Lenchewski & Jeff Drayer; Teleplay by : Andrew Lenchewski	June 10, 2014	RP#601	2.38
Hank returns to the Hamptons, helping a musician who may have a grave illness, while Evan hatches a plan to keep him in town. Divya experiences motherhood; a party guest has surprising news.
77	2	"All in the Family"	Matthew Penn	Michael Rauch & Antonia Ellis	June 17, 2014	RP#602	1.90
The Lawsons discover that they have a sister, Emma Miller (Willa Fitzgerald), but something is off about her. Meanwhile, Hank helps out a tennis pro, and Jeremiah copes with life with Divya and her baby.
78	3	"A Bridge Not Quite Far Enough"	Matthew Penn	Story by : Constance M. Burge & Jeff Drayer; Teleplay by : Constance M. Burge	June 24, 2014	RP#603	2.30
Divya searches for a nanny, while Jeremiah makes a friend (Martha Higareda). Hank, Evan and Paige encourage a relationship between Eddie (Henry Winkler) and Emma Miller.
79	4	"Steaks on a Plane"	Emile Levisetti	Jon Sherman & Carol Flint	July 1, 2014	RP#604	2.11
Boris sends Hank on a dangerous mission in Monte Carlo, Emma's presence puts a stress on Evan and Paige's marriage, and Divya and Jeremiah try to solve a mystery illness for a team of firefighters.
80	5	"Goodwill Stunting"	Paulo Costanzo	Jack Bernstein	July 8, 2014	RP#605	2.04
Evan's effort at a publicity stunt backfires, a new patient may be a mobster, Paige's career may be in jeopardy, and new hospital management may be trying to run HankMed out of business.
81	6	"Everybody Loves Ray, Man"	Constantine Makris	Jeff Drayer	July 15, 2014	RP#606	1.78
The chef at Ray's restaurant seems to be getting drunk on the job, but Hank believes it's not just a matter of hitting the bottle. Also, Divya makes a decision about her future: to work part time so she can spend more time with her baby.
82	7	"Electric Youth"	Charles McClelland	Jessica Ball	July 22, 2014	RP#606	2.07
Hank and Divya treat a professional Hamptons house-sitter who never wants to grow up. Meanwhile, Paige makes a discovery that could complicate her new business with Russel.
83	8	"I Did Not See That Coming"	Jay Chandrasekhar	Carol Flint & Jon Sherman	July 29, 2014	RP#608	1.93
Divya bonds with a woman struggling to get pregnant while Hank pursues a romance with a woman he met in Europe. Elsewhere, Divya worries about Jeremiah's and Viviana's growing relationship while Emma is invited to a hot party, and Paige, Evan, and Bob join forces to help resolve their issues with Russel.
84	9	"Oh, M.G."	Mark Feuerstein	Aubrey Karr	August 5, 2014	RP#609	2.02
Hank treats a perfumer who is losing the sense of smell. Evan and Ray hold a grand opening for HankLab. Divya tries to protect Jeremiah from Viviana.
85	10	"Good Air/Bad Air"	Jay Chandrasekhar	Carol Flint & Simran Baidwan	August 12, 2014	RP#610	1.99
Hank, Divya and Boris go to Argentina, Divya bringing Sashi to visit Rafa's mother (Sônia Braga) while Hank and Boris meet a potential patient for Boris' clinical trial. However, when Divya tries to leave with Sashi, Rafa's mother (who wants to keep Sashi) stops her. Russel tries to make amends with Paige as Jeremiah tries to talk to Viviana. Evan asks Ray to help him expose Oz after Oz causes Cinco (Ryan McCartan)’s parents to sue Hank.
86	11	"Hankmed on the Half Shell"	Joe Collins	Constance M. Burge & Jon Sherman	August 19, 2014	RP#611	1.97
Hank and Boris return with Divya from Argentina. Jeremiah, and later Divya, treat a sick model. Evan distances himself from Ray after the shooting. Emma violates Hank's trust.
87	12	"A Bigger Boat"	Janice Cooke	Story by : Jessica Ball; Teleplay by : Michael Rauch & Jessica Ball	August 26, 2014	RP#612	1.92
Evan and Paige help Emma catch Oz, who winds up being Cinco's sister, as Hank treats Cinco who has a wrist injury. Divya and Jeremiah treat a boat-builder and Charlotte has some struggles in adjusting to regaining her vision.
88	13	"Ganging Up"	Michael Rauch	Andrew Lenchewski	September 2, 2014	RP#613	1.78
After Emma disappeared, Hank and Evan search for her. Soon they learn that she had gone to see their father, who was signing a book in the city. They learn that she was upset that she destroyed their trust. She learned that they were proud of her rather than being disappointed. She decides to go on the last leg of his book tour. At the same time, Jeremiah realizes he needs to change by going into therapy. As Paige and Evan decide to "break up" from Bob, Bob asks to join HankMed, but they later learn that he wasn't licensed to practice. Divya faces another complication in her custody problems when she learns that Rafa wants sole custody. Boris worries about his illness. Hank helps an old friend, Dr. Paul Van Dyke (Kyle Howard) and his twin brother Danny Van Dyke (Danny Masterson).

=== Season 7 (2015) ===
No. overall	No. in season	Title	Directed by	Written by	Original release date	Prod. code	U.S. viewers (millions)
89	1	"Rebound"	Constantine Makris	Andrew Lenchewski	June 2, 2015	RP#701	1.67
HankMed turns a new page after Boris buys Hamptons Heritage. Hank loses Charlotte and takes care of a TV host who is hosting a party at the Newberg house. Evan and Paige discover that they may be having a baby.
90	2	"False Start"	Joe Collins	Michael Rauch & Woody Strassner	June 9, 2015	RP#702	1.46
Hank treats a triathlon patient who also gives him some dating advice. Evan is worried that he may already be a father. Jeremiah helps clear Divya's name, but her arrest video goes viral.
91	3	"Playing Doctor"	Emile Levisetti	Constance M. Burge	June 16, 2015	RP#703	1.45
An intense Hollywood method actor wants to shadow Hank to prepare for his next role. Meanwhile, Divya performs a genetic test on a royal patient who doesn't want to play by the rules.
92	4	"The Prince of Nucleotides"	Michael B. Silver	Carol Flint	June 23, 2015	RP#704	1.33
Evan and Paige consider adopting a child. Hank treats a transgender teenager. Jeremiah is in over his head when an old acquaintance comes with a business offer. Prince Quami takes an interest in Divya.
93	5	"Voices Carry"	Paulo Costanzo	Jessica Ball	June 30, 2015	RP#705	1.35
Evan thinks Boris doesn't trust him to do his job. Hank's date at the United Nations results in a big job offer. A third suitor for Divya arrives in the Hamptons. Paige is finally fed up with her lazy contractor.
94	6	"Secret Asian Man"	Ed Fraiman	Michael Rauch & Jeff Drayer	July 7, 2015	RP#706	1.45
Boris is forced to share his secret plans with Evan. Divya deals with what appears to be a Smallpox outbreak. A patient sets Hank up on a double date. Jeremiah lies low after his big business mistake.
95	7	"Lama Trauma"	Lara Shapiro	Jon Sherman	July 14, 2015	RP#707	1.34
Hank helps Boris prep a secret patient for surgery as Evan tries to chase a bad omen out of the hospital. An offer from Quami leads Divya to make a major decision about her personal life.
96	8	"Lending a Shoulder"	Jay Chandrasekhar	Michael Rauch & Constance M. Burge	July 21, 2015	RP#708	1.57
The birth mother for Evan and Paige's potential future adoptive child goes into labor, Hank runs into his ex-fiancée from New York and discovers unresolved issues with her, and Divya prepares for big life changes after her grandmother dies.

=== Season 8 (2016) ===
No. overall	No. in season	Title	Directed by	Written by	Original release date	Prod. code	U.S. viewers (millions)
97	1	"Stranger Danger"	Jay Chandrasekhar	Story by : Andrew Lenchewski & Caty Zick; Teleplay by : Andrew Lenchewski	May 18, 2016	RP#801	1.33
While preparing for Eddie's wedding, Hank treats a workaholic politician. Divya helps Jeremiah to resume working with patients. Paige and Evan start preparing to conceive.
98	2	"Palpating the Orbital Rim"	Brendan Walsh	Jon Sherman	May 25, 2016	RP#802	1.24
While Evan deals with the aftermath of the cyber-attack on Hamptons Heritage, Hank treats a stunt woman working on a supposedly cursed film. Meanwhile, Jeremiah's parents come to town and Divya tries to get them to reconnect. Hank goes on his first date with Jen and things don't go as planned.
99	3	"Fly Me to Kowloon"	Mark Feuerstein	Carol Flint & Woody Strassner	June 1, 2016	RP#803	1.26
Hank accompanies Boris to Hong Kong, where he has a whirlwind romance with a medical researcher while helping track down the Hamptons Heritage hacker. Back at home, Divya treats a mysterious repo man and Paige tries to convince Evan to try alternative methods for conception.
100	4	"Doubt of Africa"	Janice Cooke	Jessica Ball & Caty Zick	June 8, 2016	RP#804	1.24
In the 100th episode, Hank takes a shift at the ER to help an overwhelmed Evan. Jill returns to the Hamptons, but the reunion is interrupted when a doctor travelling with her displays dangerous symptoms and causes a quarantine. Meanwhile, Jeremiah treats a patient who is secretly his favorite author and Divya attempts to help a troubled young patient.
101	5	"Saab Story"	Michael Rauch	Constance M. Burge	June 15, 2016	RP#805	1.43
Keller starts feeling his age when Hank treats him for possible heart issues. Paige and Evan deal with the side effects, both physical and emotional, of in vitro fertilization. Divya meets Hank's mentor, who isn't the man Hank remembered. Jeremiah films a video for Divya's baby shower. Hank decides it's time to put down roots.
102	6	"Home Sick"	Charles McClelland	Carol Flint & Jon Sherman	June 22, 2016	RP#806	1.42
When Hank starts house hunting, he meets a new patient who believes she has a hereditary illness. At the same time, Hank tracks down Eddie and discovers what he has been hiding. Paige and Evan undergo the procedure for IVF. Jeremiah learns that Boris has been utilizing his research in secret.
103	7	"The Good News Is..."	Michael Rauch	Story by : Michael Rauch & Antonia Ellis; Teleplay by : Michael Rauch	June 29, 2016	RP#807	1.34
A special episode in which Hank reconciles Eddie and Evan, befriends and treats a theater legend (Cloris Leachman) who's scared she may have Alzheimer's disease, sees Eddie and Ms. Newberg finally tie the knot and ponder his own future...all to the cast singing and dancing to musical numbers. Paige and Evan await their official pregnancy results.
104	8	"Uninterrupted"	Michael Rauch	Andrew Lenchewski	July 6, 2016	RP#808	1.80
The summer (and the series) comes to an end as everyone begins to move on: Divya finally gets the news about her Johns Hopkins application, Boris prepares to leave the Hamptons permanently and Evan and Paige get ready to have a family that may be larger than originally anticipated. Will the only one left with an uncertain future be Hank...or has he finally chosen which path to take and where will it lead him?

== Ratings ==
Royal Pains : U.S. viewers per episode (millions)

Season	Episode number																	
Season	1	2	3	4	5	6	7	8	9	10	11	12	13	14	15	16	17	18
1	5.57	5.60	6.50	5.94	5.73	6.23	6.21	6.38	6.69	5.56	5.32	5.90	–					
2	5.84	5.60	5.51	5.30	5.32	5.20	5.28	5.01	5.53	5.39	5.27	6.08	4.43	4.34	3.87	3.86	3.89	4.05
3	5.00	5.02	4.92	5.03	4.85	5.46	5.16	5.44	5.53	5.40	3.26	3.37	4.09	3.21	3.17	3.16	–	
4	3.95	4.14	3.87	4.18	4.15	4.25	3.92	2.96	3.95	3.91	3.78	3.59	3.74	4.23	3.25	3.25	–	
5	3.68	3.67	3.55	3.54	3.82	3.58	3.54	3.60	3.21	3.18	3.27	3.62	3.75	–				
6	2.38	1.90	2.30	2.11	2.04	1.78	2.07	1.93	2.02	1.99	1.97	1.92	1.78	–				
7	1.67	1.46	1.45	1.33	1.35	1.45	1.34	1.57	–									
8	1.33	1.24	1.26	1.24	1.43	1.42	1.34	1.80	–									

Audience measurement performed by Nielsen Media Research
