= List of Royal Pains characters =

The following is a list of characters who have appeared on the USA Network series Royal Pains.

== Cast ==
Main cast of Royal Pains
| Actor | Character | Season | | | | | | | |
| Actor | Character | 1 | 2 | 3 | 4 | 5 | 6 | 7 | 8 |
|---|---|---|---|---|---|---|---|---|---|
| Mark Feuerstein | Henry "Hank" Lawson | Main | Main | Main | Main | Main | Main | Main | Main |
| Paulo Costanzo | Evan Roth Lawson | Main | Main | Main | Main | Main | Main | Main | Main |
| Jill Flint | Jill Casey | Main | Main | Main | Main | | | | Recurring |
| Reshma Shetty | Divya Katdare | Main | Main | Main | Main | Main | Main | Main | Main |
| Campbell Scott | Boris Kuester von Jurgens-Ratenicz | Recurring | Recurring | Recurring | Main | Main | Recurring | Recurring | Recurring |
| Brooke D'Orsay | Paige Collins | | Recurring | Recurring | Main | Main | Main | Main | Main |
| Ben Shenkman | Dr. Jeremiah Sacani | | | | Recurring | Main | Main | Main | Main |

== Main characters ==
=== Hank Lawson ===
Dr. Henry "Hank" Lawson
- First appearance: "Pilot" (1.01)
- Last appearance: Uninterrupted (8.08)
- Portrayed by: Mark Feuerstein

In-universe information
- Gender: Male
- Occupation: ER doctor (until 2009); Concierge doctor (2009–present)
- Spouse: Jill Casey (2016–present)
- Significant others: Jill Casey (2009, 2011–2012); Emily Peck (2010–2011); Nikki (until 2009); Harper Kublick (2012–2013)
- Relatives: Evan Lawson (brother); Eddie Lawson (father); Catherine Lawson (mother; deceased); Ted Roth (grandfather); Emma Miller (half-sister); Owen (cousin); Paige Lawson (sister-in-law via Evan); Lena Lawson (adopted niece); Wes Lawson (adopted nephew); Ian Lawson (adopted nephew); Bill Lawson (nephew); Ted Lawson (nephew)

Dr. Henry "Hank" Lawson (Mark Feuerstein): A successful New York ER doctor soon to be married to his lovely fiancée, he was dismissed from his job because he triaged a dying teenager before a billionaire hospital benefactor. The benefactor dies, after being initially stabilized following a femoral artery catheterization, from causes attributed to pericardial tamponade. Hank stands up for himself by stating he saved the kid. He spends the next month in a tailspin of broken engagements and unpaid bills before his brother convinces him to attend a posh party in the Hamptons. At the party, he saves supermodel April, and wins the favor of the German nobleman, Boris. This leads to referrals to other rich clientele. Despite Hank's dislike of the upper class, a potential love interest in local hospital administrator Jill Casey convinces him to become a concierge doctor. He drives a well-aged Saab 900 Turbo convertible. He is originally from New Jersey and sometimes throws a Jerseyism into his speech. In the episode "Keeping the Faith", he mentions that he is Jewish. In the fourth season episode "Business and Pleasure", Hank mentions that he graduated from Northwestern University and Mount Sinai School of Medicine.

In the third season finale, Hank and Evan have split, with Hank leaving HankMed and Evan hiring Dr. Van Dyke to replace him. Hank rejoins HankMed in the middle of the fourth season.

In the fourth season finale, Hank has a major accident and knocks his head, needing surgery.

In the fifth season, Hank is still recovering from his surgery and becomes dependent on pain medication that he gets Jeremiah to prescribe. In the season finale, Hank takes Boris' job offer to travel with him and his family and be their personal doctor.

In the series finale, Hank again receives an offer by Boris to travel with him and his family and be their personal doctor. Hank declines, choosing instead to travel to Africa and re-unite with Jill. Three years later, during the Memorial Day holiday, he and Jill, now married, return to the Hamptons to be with Evan, Paige and their family and continue with HankMed.

=== Evan R. Lawson ===
Evan Roth Lawson
- First appearance: "Pilot" (1.01)
- Last appearance: Uninterrupted (8.08)
- Portrayed by: Paulo Costanzo

In-universe information
- Gender: Male
- Occupation: CPA; CFO of HankMed (2009–present)
- Spouse: Paige Collins (2012–present)
- Children: Lena Lawson (adopted daughter); Wes Lawson (adopted son); Ian Lawson (adopted son); Bill Lawson (son); Ted Lawson (son)
- Relatives: Hank Lawson (brother); Eddie Lawson (father); Catherine Lawson (mother; deceased); Ted Roth (grandfather); Emma Miller (half-sister); Owen (cousin)

Evan Roth Lawson (Paulo Costanzo): Hank Lawson's brother. He is an accountant (CPA), makes himself Hank's CFO after he establishes "HankMed" as well as the unofficial Public Relations Manager. He views the Hamptons as a place to pursue attractive women, especially Divya, who continually rebuffs him. He is materialistic, especially in comparison to Hank and when promised money and fun, he is up to do anything. He tries to promote HankMed against Hank's will, and many of his subplots revolve around him engaging in some scheme (against Hank's wishes) that ends up going wrong. When Hank is given a Tesla all-electric roadster by "New Parts" Newberg and her dog Koufax, Hank in turn gives it to Evan (who later, to help out HankMed's struggling finances, sells it). While many of his intentions (if not his motives) are good, he originally doesn't seem to realize the consequences of some of his actions; for example, in Episode 12, "Wonderland", Evan invests all the capital from HankMed into a con stock company investment with a broker who turns out to be his and Hank's father. When this goes disastrously wrong, he leaves the Hamptons, informing his brother that he is going to try to get the money back.

Evan is a womanizer (unsuccessfully most of the time), but it is often hinted that he is attracted to Divya, as he continues to make passes at her despite her rather harsh rebuffs. She kisses him passionately in Episode 10, "Am I Blue?", to keep him from getting beaten up by the angry boyfriend of a girl Evan had been trying to be "just friends" with.

Evan also has a soft/blind spot where his father Eddie is concerned. When Eddie reappears in the brothers' lives, Evan, unlike Hank, wants to forgive and forget, for a long time refusing to see character flaws in Eddie which Hank and Boris have immediately spotted, which makes Boris' exposure of Eddie's criminal acts towards the end of Season 2 even worse. However, Evan is still determined to maintain a relationship with Eddie, and the brothers stand by their father when he is sentenced. In Season 8 after Eddie disappears without a word on the day of his marriage to Ms. Newberg, Evan is determined to finally break off any relationship with his father, and it is only through Hank's efforts that they are reconciled.

By the second season finale, he is finally in a serious relationship with Paige Collins and at Hank's urging has left with her for a trip to Europe.

In the third season, he proposes to Paige and they are engaged, but his ambitions and plans to expand HankMed cause major friction between himself and Hank. They get married with Eddie as the minister (his license from the internet) which turns out, in Season 5, to not be legal in the Hamptons township bylaws.

In the sixth season, Hank offers them his spare room, but Paige and Evan rent a new home and insist that Emma stay with them. This causes tension, as they begin to feel very cramped in such a small space with three people. Their landlord helps them realize mid-squabble that Paige and Evan tend to put others needs above their own and they "do this to ourselves."

In Season 7, Boris buys Hampton Heritage and appoints Evan as Interim Hospital Administrator. Later, Evan becomes the permanent Hospital Administrator.

In the series finale, when Boris leaves the Hamptons permanently, he gives Evan full tenancy of Shadow Pond.

=== Divya Katdare ===
Divya Katdare
- First appearance: "Pilot" (1.01)
- Last appearance: Uninterrupted (8.08)
- Portrayed by: Reshma Shetty

In-universe information
- Gender: Female
- Occupation: Physician Assistant
- Spouses: Rafa Correia (2012–2013); Raj Bandyopadhyay
- Significant others: Raj Bandyopadhyay (2009–2011); Adam (2010, briefly); Rafa Correia (2012–2013)
- Children: Sashi Correia (daughter via Rafa); Unnamed Boy (son via Raj); Bea (step-daughter via Raj); Cal (step-son via Raj); Unnamed (former step-son via Rafa)
- Relatives: Rubina Katdare (mother); Devesh Katdare (father); Saya (sister); Sanjay (brother-in-law)

Divya Katdare (Reshma Shetty): Hank's physician assistant. She later has her formal title changed to Physician Associate, on the grounds that people only look at the "Assistant" part of the title. She interviews to be Hank's physician assistant after word travels of Hank's instant reputation as a concierge doctor. Initially brushed off by Hank (despite her truckload of medical equipment), she gains the job by the second episode. She is Indian and her family spends the summer in the Hamptons. Divya admits that she is practicing medicine without her parents' knowledge, stating that she is unhappy with the degree of control they try to exert over her, the most notorious example being forcing her to marry her childhood friend, an Indian man named Raj Bandyopadhyay. In Episode 5, "No Man Is An Island", Divya reveals to Jill that she has tried to start a concierge physician service twice before, but failed both times. She later is forced to tell her parents about her career after Evan practically told them everything (under the belief that they already knew). They accept the news, but still expect her to marry Raj and leave the Hamptons, letting her reveal that she hates the fact that her parents never consider any of her ideas. It was revealed that she first wanted to get into medicine when she was a little girl and helped take care of a cut on her friend. When she told her parents they did not listen and told her that she would get an MBA, marry Raj, and work at his business. In the last episode of the first season, she resolves to break off the engagement at the last minute. She changes her mind, and becomes engaged to Raj. In the second season, she becomes increasingly wary of her wedding, culminating in her becoming infatuated with Adam, one of HankMed's patients. In the season finale, after she and Raj are exposed to pneumonic plague, Divya decides to call off her wedding once and for all, as she felt the universe had sent her "one sign too many" that she could not ignore.

In the 2011 season premiere, Divya broke the news to her parents that she and Raj had broken off their engagement. Divya's mother tries to convince her to beg Raj to take her back. She tells her parents that she refuses to go along with their wishes and wants to marry for love instead, which upsets her father. In the episode "But There's a Catch", all signs point to the fact that Divya has been financially cut off by her parents after refusing to go through with the marriage, as her credit (which was still in her father's name) was refused when buying supplies for HankMed, her car was repossessed, and Evan finds out that she has not cashed any of the checks paid to her through the practice. Hank and Evan allow Divya to stay with them until she gets back on her feet, even going so far as to buy her a car. Divya eventually moves into a place of her own, only to discover that Raj's parents expect her personally to pay off the expenses they put into the engagement and wedding. Rather than sell her shares of HankMed to them, as they had intended, Divya takes a part-time shift at Hamptons Heritage to pay off the debt, but the mounting demands on her time juggling both jobs has serious consequences which cause her to resign of her own accord. By the end of the third season, Evan comes up with a solution to her debt problem.

In Season 4, Divya and Rafa were married in Las Vegas but in the season finale of Season 4, Divya says they need to end it, as she burns their license.

It is revealed in Episode 1 of Season 5 that Divya is pregnant with Rafa's baby. In "Bones to Pick" Divya falls down in pain and is rushed to the hospital where she, Hank, Evan, and Paige discover that she has a subchorionic hemorrhage behind the placenta. Jeremiah shows up at the hospital to see Divya after Evan calls him to talk to Divya. Everyone else leaves the room and Jeremiah admits his feelings to Divya. When Divya is put on bedrest, Jeremiah offers to take care of her, since she lives with him. Divya worries that he may still be in love with her and she says she does not want to take advantage of him, but Jeremiah says that he has outgrown his original feelings for her but that he has not outgrown his friendship with her.

In Season 6, Divya has a party for her newborn little girl and the "army of random Hampton notables" her father invited.

In the Season 7 finale, Divya and Raj attend the funeral rites of her grandmother. Later, Raj and Divya admit that they love each another; he proposes to Divya and she accepts.

In the final season, Divya is pregnant with her second child, a boy and Raj is the father. She is also accepted at the Johns Hopkins School of Medicine and begins studying to become a full-fledged doctor. In the closing epilogue scene, Evan discusses the HankMed schedule with Hank, disclosing that Divya is still a member of HankMed.

=== Jill Casey-Lawson ===
Jill Casey-Lawson
- First appearance: "Pilot" (1.01)
- Last appearance: "Uninterrupted" (8.08)
- Portrayed by: Jill Flint

In-universe information
- Gender: Female
- Occupation: Hospital administrator at Hampton's Heritage; Doctor in Africa
- Spouses: Charlie Casey (until 2009); Hank Lawson (2016–)
- Significant other: Hank Lawson (2009, 2011–2012)
- Relatives: Ernie McGillicuddy (brother); Luke McGillicuddy (nephew via Ernie)

Jill Casey (née McGillicuddy) (Jill Flint): Hank's on-again/off-again girlfriend. She is an executive-level administrator at Hamptons Heritage, the area hospital looked down upon by the elite (who have a running gag stating how it is a death trap or "taco stand"), because it had saved her arm after a teenage surfing accident. Her maiden name is McGillicuddy, something she is not fond of. She has three older brothers.

Hank and Jill meet in the first season opener while leaving Boris' party and again when Hank is dealing with "New Parts" Newberg; at the end of the episode, Jill and Hank's love and career interests blossom at a clam shack. For the first three episodes Jill drives a well-aged Saab 900 Turbo convertible essentially identical to Hank's car, but replaces it with a new Toyota Prius after her Saab "dies". She describes Hank as "cute", as she says in Episode 2 while she is drunk, and again at the end of the episode, when not drunk. She is often worried that her relationship with Hank will turn out like her other relationships, all of which were disasters. In Episode 7 she reveals that she gave her ex-husband (Charlie) an ultimatum, either her or his job, he chose his job and left her. It is later revealed she is still legally married to Charlie, because with all his travels she could never locate him to give him the papers to sign. In the last episode of the first season, she was going to tell Hank she wanted to be with him, she sees him with another girl (his patient for the episode) and gets the wrong idea. She later kicks Charlie out of her house at the end of the first season. She left the show to organize hospitals in Africa, thus fulfilling her dream of helping the poor.

In Season 8 in the series' 100th episode "Doubt of Africa", she returns to the Hamptons for a visit. In the series finale, Hank leaves the Hamptons to travel to Africa to see her, and their relationship is rekindled. In the episode's epilogue, it is revealed that she and Hank are now married and still working in Africa (although they will be spending the summer in the Hamptons working at HankMed and spending time with their whole family).

=== Paige Collins-Lawson ===
Paige Lawson
- First appearance: "Comfort's Overrated" (2.07)
- Last appearance: Uninterrupted (8.08)
- Portrayed by: Brooke D'Orsay

In-universe information
- Gender: Female
- Occupation: Art Collector
- Spouse: Evan Lawson (2012–present)
- Significant others: Graham (until 2010); Evan Lawson (2010–present)
- Children: Lena Lawson (adopted daughter); Wes Lawson (adopted son); Ian Lawson (adopted son); Bill Lawson (son); Ted Lawson (son)
- Relatives: William Collins (adopted father); Ellen Collins (adopted mother); Unnamed (biological mother); Hank Lawson (brother-in-law); Jill Casey-Lawson (sister-in-law); Emma Miller (sister-in-law)

Paige Lawson (née Collins) (Brooke D'Orsay): An upper-class girl who pays Evan to pretend to be her boyfriend while she has a relationship with a much older man. She is somewhat domineering, as is her father, who is a retired general. She is also naive, and believes that any problem can be solved by money. She engages in many hobbies befitting her high social status including hunting, painting, golf, and surfing, and has a long list of connections she can call upon.

Her first appearance, "Comfort's Overrated", was when her boyfriend Graham, a man in his 50s, was injured in a surfing accident. She attempts to hire Hank as a "faux-beau", a fake boyfriend to cover from her parents who are questioning her lack of evidence of having a boyfriend. While Hank declines, Evan manages to convince her to hire him, which leads to a day of makeovers and photo shoots. During this, Evan begins to fall in love with her, which Paige fails to or refuses to consider. Graham breaks up with her as he leaves for his African photo shoot, wishing that she did not feel the need to hide him from her parents.

However, her "faux-beau" diversion was still in effect, and in "Frenemies" Evan is taken to meet her parents. When her father blindsides them by taking them to a year-round hunting grounds, Evan's inadequacy leads to his suffering a minor injury. After realizing Evan's dedication to her, and hearing his heartfelt, unrehearsed speech on her own dedications, she decides to take him out for dinner. There are some major ups and downs in their relationship and at the end of the second season she invites Evan to join her in a trip to Europe; at Hank's urging he agrees.

In the third season, Evan proposed to Paige. In the fourth season, Paige found out she was adopted. At the Season 4 finale, Paige and Evan are married. They marry with Eddie as the minister (his license from the internet) which turns out, in Season 5, to not be legal in the Hamptons township bylaws.

In the fifth season, Paige is offered a job for a few months in Paris, just after Evan is elected into the township council. Paige says she thinks they need distance from everything that is getting in the way of their marriage. Evan finally acts like an adult and puts his and Paige's relationship above his own ambitions. Paige says that Kristoff can go to Paris and she'll stay here with Evan but the first thing they need to do is to get legally married and go to marriage counseling (as Evan says at the same time that they should go on their honeymoon). They then agree that they should go on a honeymoon.

In the sixth season, Hank offers his spare room, but Paige and Evan rent a new home and insist that Emma stay with them. This causes tension, as they begin to feel very cramped in such a small space with three people. Their landlord helps them realise mid-squabble, that Paige and Evan tend to put others needs above their own and they "do this to ourselves." They tell Emma and she says she completely understands and agrees to move into Hank's spare room.

One of the plotlines in the final two seasons is her and Evan's struggle to become pregnant, a goal made difficult because of Evan's low sperm count and motility, culminating in Season 8 in an in vitro fertilisation that, despite some premature false alarms to the negative from a home pregnancy kit, prove successful.

=== Jeremiah Sacani ===
Jeremiah Sacani
- First appearance: "After the Fireworks" (4.1)
- Last appearance: Uninterrupted (8.08)
- Portrayed by: Ben Shenkman

In-universe information
- Gender: Male
- Occupation: Doctor at HankMed
- Significant others: Viviana Torres; Cindy Green
- Relatives: Chuck Sacani (father); Barb Scanci (mother)

Dr. Jeremiah Sacani (Ben Shenkman) is one of the two physicians brought to HankMed by Evan after Hank temporarily resigns. Dr. Sacani is an excellent physician, but is extremely socially inept. He often is uncomfortable around people, preferring to distance himself to the point that he memorized his patients by Social Security Number rather than by name. He is shown to have a small amount of hero worship for Hank, whom he desperately wants to impress. He falls in love with Divya, very early on after he is hired, but she is unaware and it is so difficult to work with her while she is dating Rafa that he leaves to go on a research trip to Iceland.

When Divya's house needs to go under construction to get rid of a toxic mold and to add a window to her walk-in closet for her new nursery, Jeremiah offers to share his home with Divya. He, at first, finds it very difficult to share his personal space with her when she tries to add a little homey touch to the kitchen by adding a bouquet of flowers and a throw. He later realises she is nesting and becomes more comfortable with her there. It is not until Season 5's "Bones to Pick" that Jeremiah admits to Divya how much he cares for her and her friendship. When Divya is put on bedrest, Jeremiah offers to take care of her, since she already still lives with him. Divya worries that he may still be in love with her and she says she does not want to take advantage of him, but Jeremiah says that he has outgrown his original feelings for her but that he has not outgrown his friendship with her.

Also in Season 5, Jeremiah officially resigns from HankMed after feeling like he was manipulated and used by Hank when Hank asked him for a prescription for pain medication after his head surgery. Hank offers Jeremiah another option: that he can work at HankMed but never have to work with Hank because Jeremiah would be in charge, not Hank.

In Season 6, Jeremiah struggles with living with Divya and her new baby because the baby is so messy, chaotic, and keeps burping on him (he even goes so far as to go into his closet and yell into a pillow to let out his frustrations). After Hank gets back from being a helicopter doctor, he asks Jeremiah if he wants to continue being the HankMed Director, which Jeremiah says he does. Jeremiah begins frequenting a pub for lunch and seems to be building feelings for Viviana, the bartender at the pub.

In the series finale epilogue, it is revealed that Jeremiah is still a member of HankMed.

=== Boris Kuester von Jurgens-Ratenicz ===
Boris Kuester von Jurgens-Ratenicz
- First appearance: "Pilot" (1.01)
- Last appearance: Uninterrupted (8.08)
- Portrayed by: Campbell Scott

In-universe information
- Gender: Male
- Spouse: Marissa Casseras
- Significant other: Marissa Casseras
- Children: Carlos Casseras Kuester von Jurgens-Ratenicz
- Relatives: Dimitri (maternal half-brother; deceased); Claudette Von Jurgens (cousin); Milos (cousin)

Boris Kuester von Jurgens-Ratenicz (Campbell Scott): A mysterious (seemingly) German nobleman with a large estate in the Hamptons (filmed at Long Island's Oheka Castle). In the series' pilot, Hank saves the life of April, a guest at Boris' party and Boris rewards Hank with a bar of solid gold, a job as concierge doctor, and use of his guest house. He has apparently referred several of Hank's patients to him and admits to "having plans" for Hank. Boris is extremely secretive, having moved to the Hamptons specifically to stay out of the public eye. Boris sometimes uses his money to bend and break rules. He owns a shark which was being used in a medical experiment and injures one of the scientists in one episode. Hank states after a physical examination that Boris is in almost perfect physical health, yet Hank knows that something is wrong. It is later discovered that Boris has a genetic disease that has affected, at least, the past three generations of his family. The condition causes a lack of muscle control, degenerating brain function, and death around the age of 44. Boris is somewhat cavalier about experimentation to cure his disease; this has led to unintended side effects such as muscle spasms and temporary blindness from not heeding Hank's advice.

In Season 2, Boris agrees to let Hank "quarterback" a cooperative effort between all of Boris' former doctors and researchers. Hank's first point of contact is for Dr. Marissa Casseras in Cuba, which is fortunate for Boris as they were former lovers. In "Medusa" they fly to Cuba to consult her; having diagnosed the condition, she allows for Boris to enter a clinical trial on the condition. While Hank suggests further research to confirm its success and validity, Boris begins treatment the next day. During a code blue, Boris crashes and needs to reboot, which loses the data for the trial but keeps him alive. He later decides to stay for an extended period to reconnect with Marissa, and he announces that Marissa will be defecting upon his return in "Whole Lotto Love". However, by the last episode it seems that she was arrested and detained, leaving a distressed, helpless Boris.

At one point, Jill drops Boris' name in an attempt to prevent the hospital board's closing down her free clinic in an attempt to take it over; the stratagem works, but at the cost of losing Boris as a donor, as his privacy as an anonymous donor was violated. He is seen in the half-season finale flying out in a helicopter, despite his weakness, and retrieving Marissa from custody by unknown means. Also as a precaution against Eddie, he begins an investigation into the Lawsons to determine their implication in Eddie's role as a confidential informant, using his aide Catherine (Rena Sofer) posing as a patient. His findings are revealed to the family, which resulted in Eddie's heart attack. When it seems certain that Eddie will be convicted and sentenced to prison, he offers to have Eddie spirited out of the country and beyond extradition, but he makes it clear to Eddie that he is doing this for Hank and Evan's benefit because he believes that the brothers will be better off without Eddie in their lives. When he learns that Marissa is pregnant with his child and that Hank knew but did not tell him, he evicts Hank and Evan from his summer house. However, realizing his rashness and accepting the strength of Hank's ethics, he asks Hank to come back in Season 3 and HankMed moves back into the summer home.

Hank discovers that Boris was poisoned with thallium, which caused, among other things, muscle spasms. The diagnosis was made on the basis of Boris' blood causing Hank's bare hand to tingle. The poison was found in the swimming pool, and Dieter, Boris' manservant, was nowhere to be found. They discuss the possibility that Boris' family inheritance of illness may have been the result of "family politics". Things become more complicated when a member of Boris' family comes for a visit, bringing hopes of reconciliation.

Boris is involved with Dimitri in a secret, multinational operation in Season 4. In the episode "Off-Season's Greetings", it is hinted that he faked his own death in an explosion at Shadow Pond. In one episode Boris mentions visiting his family in Kleinwalsertal, Austria.

In the series finale, after Hank and Evan discover Shadow Pond has been scrubbed of Boris's DNA, Boris reveals that his "family politics" have forced him to decide to retreat from public view altogether and he will be taking his wife and son to a secret location to live in peace and privacy. He and Hank painstakingly destroy all of his medical records, during which Hank deduces that Boris has some Russian ancestry and that Russian oligarchs are trying to persuade him to help run the country, an idea Boris is not opposed to but wishes to do in his own time and on his own terms.

After Hank turns down his invitation to join him in his new life, Boris bids the doctor a fond farewell, saying he considers Hank family. The two men hug on the beach before Boris boards a yacht for parts unknown.

== Former characters ==
=== Emily Peck ===
Dr. Emily Peck
- First appearance: "Keeping the Faith" (2.03)
- Last appearance: "A History of Violins" (2.15)
- Portrayed by: Anastasia Griffith

In-universe information
- Gender: Female
- Occupation: Concierge doctor
- Significant other: Hank Lawson (2010–2011)

Dr. Emily Peck (Anastasia Griffith): A rival concierge doctor. She is young and overachieving, with an arrogant, perfectionist attitude. She has a podcast and believes in schmoozing her patients much more than Hank does. She is hired by Boris as a substitute for Hank during his (extended) stay in Cuba, and Divya has trouble putting up with her. She later moves to the Hamptons, claiming that the Hamptons are big enough for the both of them, leading to conflict when she attempts to secure her own position through aggressive marketing. She eventually leaves for San Diego during "Big Whoop" to deal with family.

She is more cautious socially, legally and pragmatically, as she refuses to react to calls for a doctor unless she can be sure it would not legally endanger her, an example being in the episode "Mano a Mano" when she didn't even move when she saw a young boy choking. Her attitude to medicine leads to many conflicts; rather than using the most medically sound practice, she would rather use a more well-received treatment to keep her patients liking her. Nevertheless, her perfectionism leads to hold all to high standards, including herself; any clinical error she makes she finds distressing. She and Hank carry on a relationship for portions of the second season, but the relationship ends when Emily is either unwilling or unable to share with Hank as much of herself as he hoped.

=== Tucker and Libby ===
Tucker Bryant
- First appearance: "Pilot" (1.01)
- Last appearance: "In Vino Veritas" (2.06)
- Portrayed by: Ezra Miller

In-universe information
- Gender: Male
- Significant other: Libby (ex-girlfriend)
- Relatives: Marshall Bryant IV (father); Marshall Bryant III (grandfather)

Libby
- First appearance: "Pilot" (1.01)
- Last appearance: "Uninterrupted" (8.08)
- Portrayed by: Meredith Hagner

In-universe information
- Gender: Female
- Significant other: Tucker Bryant (ex-boyfriend)
- Relatives: Elyse (mother); Anna (step-mother); Unnamed father

Tucker Bryant (Ezra Miller) and Libby (Meredith Hagner): Hank's second and third Hamptons patients. Tucker Bryant is the teenage great-grandson of the inventor (Marshall David Bryant II) of the blender (in reality, the blender was invented by Stephen J. Poplawski) and Libby is his girlfriend. Tucker and Libby were injured when Tucker crashed his father's Ferrari F430. Libby's injuries are mild, but she proves to be a cyberchondriac and thanks to the Internet is prone to bouts of medical babbling. She is also a health nut, prompting Tucker to state, "she has food so fresh you can taste the dirt"; Tucker describes Libby as "a handful" but quickly adds "but the best usually are." Hank discovers that Tucker, who was more severely wounded, is a hemophiliac, which complicates his injuries. Hank performs a MacGyver-like procedure to stabilize him (such procedures are pretty commonplace in the series).

Hank later befriends the young couple, despite a stern rebuke from Tucker's wealthy father, Marshall David Bryant IV. The elder Bryant, however, is rarely home, which causes Hank to become a surrogate father to Tucker. The couple is almost broken up by Evan's bad advice to Tucker on trust in male/female relationships, but they ultimately remain together.

Later in Season 2, in the episode "In Vino Veritas", it is revealed that Tucker's father is a substance abuser (after a severe withdrawal overseen by Hank, Tucker takes his father to a rehab center in New Canaan, Connecticut) and that Tucker's grandfather has "cut off" Tucker's father. Tucker is now in charge of his father's finances.

Libby's parents are revealed to have divorced several years earlier after Libby's bisexual mother left her father for another woman named Anna (Camille Chen). In Season 3, in the episode "An Apple A Day", Hank must treat Libby's mother Elyse (Julie Benz), who has trouble healing from an injury due to scurvy.

At some time between Seasons 4 and 8, revealed in the series finale episode "Uninterrupted", Tucker and Libby split up permanently and Libby, her cyberchondria now totally controlled, becomes involved in humanitarian causes.

=== Marshall Bryant ===
Marshall David Bryant IV
- First appearance: "There Will Be Food" (1.02)
- Portrayed by: Andrew McCarthy

In-universe information
- Gender: Male
- Occupation: Heir
- Children: Tucker Bryant
- Relatives: Marshall Bryant III (father)

Marshall David Bryant IV (Andrew McCarthy): Tucker's father and the heir to the blender fortune. He is rarely home, leaving Tucker to fend for himself. He is also domineering, and does not like it when Hank or Tucker stand up to him. In one episode, he is revealed to have a substance abuse problem. Marshall attempts to use a rapid detoxification program, which almost kills him, yet he continues to use drugs. Tucker responds by telling his father that what he wants for his birthday present is for his father to get clean, and he is last seen being driven by Tucker to a detox center. In the second season it is revealed that he has been cut off from his money by his father and all the money has been left to Tucker.

=== Charlie Casey ===
Dr. Charlie Casey
- First appearance: "It's Like Jamais Vu All Over Again" (1.09)
- Last appearance: "Wonderland" (1.12)
- Portrayed by: Bruno Campos

In-universe information
- Gender: Male
- Occupation: ER Doctor
- Spouse: Jill Casey (until 2009)

Dr. Charlie Casey (Bruno Campos): Jill's ex-husband and a doctor at Hampton's Heritage. He is portrayed as a pompous jerk unable to take no for an answer, yet seemingly liked among the higher staff, where Jill once stated, "through any disaster he has come out of clean, leaving me to clean up the mess". When things do not work out with Jill, she gives him an ultimatum to choose between her and his job, and he chooses his job. When Jill attempts to file for divorce, Charlie flees the country to invalidate it, though when he returns, he hints that he might let the divorce go through, yet he repeatedly postpones signing it to try to woo her. He is alluded to in several episodes, most of the times being brought up by Jill when Hank does something that reminds her of Charlie and makes her believe she is making the same mistake again. Charlie eventually makes an appearance halfway through the first season, when he confronts Jill and gets brambles removed by Hank. He also gets his old job back at Hamptons Heritage. He is trying to win Jill back, which complicates things with Jill and Hank and hinders their relationship for a while. In the first season finale, she kicks Charlie out of her house after he lies to her. It is also revealed he quit from Hamptons Heritage and moved away.

=== Elizabeth Blair ===
Dr. Elizabeth Blair
- First appearance: "Spasticity" (2.01)
- Last appearance: "Big Whoop" (2.11)
- Portrayed by: Marcia Gay Harden

In-universe information
- Gender: Female
- Occupation: Surgeon
- Spouse: Jamie Zimmerman (estranged)
- Children: Jake Zimmerman

Dr. Elizabeth Blair (Marcia Gay Harden): A surgeon and board member at Hamptons Heritage Hospital who is a mentor-turned-adversary to Jill. After the resignation of Charlie, Blair believes Jill is a liability to the hospital. She becomes one of Hank's clients when her son develops carbon monoxide poisoning from an improperly vented hot tub. In the second season, she often tries to interfere with Jill's free clinic proposal, although she claims it is because of the board's decision.

== Recurring characters ==
=== Raj Bandyopadhyay ===
Raj Bandyopadhyay
- First appearance: "Crazy Love" (1.07)
- Last appearance: The Good New Is... (8.07)
- Portrayed by: Rupak Ginn

In-universe information
- Gender: Male
- Occupation: Real Estate Agent
- Spouses: Karen (2012–2014); Divya Katdare (2015–present)
- Significant others: Divya Katdare (2009–2011); Karen (2012–2014)
- Children: Bea (daughter via Karen); Cal (son via Karen); Sashi Katdare (step-daughter via Divya); Unnamed Boy (son via Divya)
- Relatives: Unnamed Parents

Raj Bandyopadhyay (Rupak Ginn): Divya's fiancée from an arranged marriage at the beginning of the series. Divya broke off the engagement at the end of Season 2 partly for the need for independence and partly because she felt she and Raj were not fated for one another. They reconnected in Season 7 after each had a failed marriage and children and were finally married. In the final season, they are expecting a baby boy, their first child together.

=== Ms. Newberg ===
"New Parts" Newberg
- First appearance: "Pilot" (1.01)
- Last appearance: "The Good New Is..." (8.07)
- Portrayed by: Christine Ebersole

In-universe information
- Gender: Female
- Spouses: Five unnamed ex-husbands; Eddie Lawson (2016–present)
- Significant other: Eddie Lawson (2010–present)
- Children: Blake (former stepdaughter); Hank Lawson (stepson); Evan Lawson (stepson); Emma Miller (stepdaughter)
- Relatives: Unnamed granddaughter; Ted Roth (father-in-law via Eddie)

Ms. "New Parts" Newberg (Christine Ebersole): A middle-aged woman who is always having cosmetic surgery that turns out badly. In the first episode, when one of her saline implants fails, Hank empties her other implant to make both breasts even. In the third episode, Evan signs her to a summer-long retainer for a large amount of money. However, she cares deeply for anyone who works for her, referring to them as family, even using her retainer to have Hank take care of her maid. She is also obsessed with her dog Koufax, and throws a "bark mitzvah" for him. She has been married at least three times to a lawyer, a doctor and a banker. She has a stepdaughter named Blake and at least one granddaughter. In Season 2, it is revealed that she has begun a relationship with Eddie Lawson. Although Hank and Evan are skeptical, it seems that the relationship has a positive effect on Eddie, though Newberg sometimes assumes the persona of an overbearing stepmother. In between Seasons 2 and 3, Ms. Newberg allowed Hank and Evan to stay at her mansion and operate their business after they were evicted from Boris' summer house (she resides in Manhattan outside the summer).

In Season 8, she and Eddie Lawson are married.

=== Eddie Lawson ===
Eddie R. Lawson
- First appearance: "Spasticity" (2.01)
- Last appearance: The Good New Is... (8.07)
- Portrayed by: Henry Winkler

In-universe information
- Gender: Male
- Occupation: Self-help book author
- Spouses: Catherine Lawson (deceased); Ms. Newberg (2016–present)
- Significant others: Meredith Miller (1996); Ms. Newberg (2010–present)
- Children: Hank Lawson (son via Catherine); Evan Lawson (son via Catherine); Emma Miller (daughter via Meredith)
- Relatives: Ted Roth (father); Paige Lawson (daughter-in-law via Evan); Lena Lawson (adopted granddaughter via Evan); Wes Lawson (adopted grandson via Evan); Ian Lawson (adopted grandson via Evan); Bill Lawson (grandson via Evan); Ted Lawson (grandson via Evan); Jill Casey-Lawson (daughter-in-law via Hank)

Eddie Roth Lawson (Henry Winkler): Hank and Evan's father. He is discussed extensively in Season 1. During Hank's adolescence and Evan's childhood, he walked out on the family when their mother was dying. Evan has been able to reconcile himself with his father's legacy, but Hank has pointedly not. At the end of Season 1, Evan lends all of HankMed's capital to Eddie, which almost bankrupts HankMed and leads to a rift between Hank and Evan. He makes his first on-screen appearance in the Season 2 opener, when he returns some of Hank and Evan's money, to which Hank responds by punching him in the face. By the next episode, he has returned all of the money and has begun a relationship with "New Parts" Newberg. Though Hank asks Eddie to leave The Hamptons (as he is causing him too much trouble), he decides to stay. He attempts to be a good father to his children, but often misses the mark. He attempts to pull some sort of con on Boris, which later turns out to be spying on him for the Securities and Exchange Commission in return for a reduced fraud sentence. It is a devastating blow to him when he is actually convicted and sentenced to prison. He accepts Boris' offer of escape but in a last-minute change of heart agrees to stay and serve his sentence. In Season 3, he is conditionally released on a special work program, one of the conditions of which is the wearing of an ankle bracelet and night-time confinement at his sponsor's house–the sponsor in question being his estranged father (Ed Asner). After his successful parole hearing, he decides to remain temporarily in Florida to repair his relationship with his father.

In Season 8, Eddie announces his engagement to Ms. Newberg to Hank and Evan, but disappears on the day of the wedding. Hank eventually tracks him down (to the Lawson family's old home in Passaic, New Jersey), and Eddie explains that fear and serious medical problems caused his flight. While Hank understands, Evan is not so forgiving and Eddie's relationship with him is nearly destroyed. In the penultimate episode "The Good News Is ...", Hank manages to reconcile them, and Eddie and Ms. Newberg are successfully married and leave for their honeymoon.

=== Marissa Casseras ===
Dr. Marissa Casseras
- First appearance: "Medusa" (2.04)
- Last appearance: "Fly Me To Kowloon" (8.03)
- Portrayed by: Paola Turbay

In-universe information
- Gender: Female
- Occupation: Doctor
- Spouse: Boris Kuester von Jurgens-Ratenicz
- Children: Carlos Casseras Kuester von Jurgen-Ratenicz (son)

Dr. Marissa Casseras (Paola Turbay): A Cuban doctor who is one of the leading experimenters on Boris' condition. She advocates a risky procedure for Boris that involves a bone marrow extraction, of which Hank disapproves. She and Boris are somewhat amorous, and it is her love for Boris that drives her. When attempting to flee Cuba for the United States, she is arrested. Boris later brings her to the Hamptons, where Hank finds out she is pregnant and that she does not want Boris to know because of his determination that his genetic condition will not be passed on. Boris is angered when he learns about the pregnancy and that Hank kept the knowledge from him; however, his attitude changes and they have a son, with Hank becoming the child's godfather.

=== Adam Pierce ===
Adam Pierce
- First appearance: "Whole Lotto Love" (2.10)
- Last appearance: "A History of Violins" (2.15)
- Portrayed by: Patrick Heusinger

In-universe information
- Gender: Male
- Occupation: Documentarian
- Significant other: Divya Katdare (2010, briefly)

Adam Pierce (Patrick Heusinger) is a former HankMed patient with whom Divya had a brief affair. After kissing him, she immediately confessed to Hank, promising she would never see him again. However, she later returned to treat him, angering Hank. Though Adam still wanted to date Divya, she said she could not, as she was engaged to Raj. The heavily conflicting desires of Divya and the resultant emotional confusion resulted in Adam leaving to film another documentary at the end of "A History of Violins".

=== Jack O'Malley ===
Jack O'Malley
- First appearance: "Mulligan" (2.13)
- Last appearance: "This One's For Jack" (3.16)
- Portrayed by: Tom Cavanagh

In-universe information
- Gender: Male
- Occupation: Professional Golfer
- Spouse: Unnamed Ex-Wife
- Died: "Hank and the Deep Blue Sea" (3.15)

Jack O'Malley (Tom Cavanagh) is a professional golfer first seen paired with Jill Casey at a golf fundraiser in Season 2. He had been a promising young golfer, but had choked during a tournament on the 18th tee. He is first diagnosed by Hank of having a disorder of the hand causing the curvature of his fingers, and is successfully treated. Jack returns in Season 3 in order to get a physical from Hank, but discovers that he has lupus. He attempts to delay treatment and later passes away.

=== Emma Miller ===
Emma Miller
- First appearance: "Smoke and Mirrors" (6.01)
- Last appearance: "Ganging Up" (6.13)
- Portrayed by: Willa Fitzgerald

In-universe information
- Gender: female
- Occupation: waitress/chef College Student
- Significant other: Cinco (2014)
- Relatives: Meredith Miller (mother); Eddie Lawson (father); Hank Lawson (paternal half-brother); Evan Lawson (paternal half-brother); Paige Lawson (half sister-in-law via Evan); Jill Lawson (half sister-in-law via Hank); Ted Roth (paternal grandfather); Paige Lawson (sister-in-law via Evan); Jill Casey-Lawson (sister-in-law via Hank); Lena Lawson (adopted niece via Evan); Wes Lawson (adopted nephew via Evan); Ian Lawson (adopted nephew via Evan); Bill Lawson (nephew via Evan); Ted Lawson (nephew via Evan)

Emma Miller (Willa Fitzgerald) is the 17-year-old half-sister of Hank and Evan, the daughter of Eddie and Meredith (a fling from a long time ago). Eddie did not know that Emma existed, but later finds out from a PI investigation that Emma ran away from her mother and has been lying to everyone about her childhood. Eddie, Hank, Evan, and Paige invite Emma to stay with them for the summer. Evan admits to Paige that he paid ("bribe" in Paige's words) Emma to hang out with Eddie and to help her pay for her apartment because it is so expensive: "I was trying to be a good brother." He says that he just wanted Emma to have a chance to get to know Eddie. At the end of Season 6, Episode 4: "A Bridge Not Quite Far Enough", Evan says to Paige, "Is she staying because of us or because of the money?" After moving in with Paige and Evan, they eventually ask her to move out because they are too crowded in their new place. Emma moves in with Hank. In "Goodwill Stunting" Emma sells a picture of a celebrity to a gossip magazine and continues to do so in "Electric Youth".

== Minor and substantial characters ==
=== Dieter ===
Dieter (Dieter Riesle): Boris' manservant. He has appeared in several episodes with his employer, Boris, but has almost no dialogue. He does a variety of tasks, including assembling dossiers on people with whom Boris associates. He was the one responsible for Boris' near-death poisoning in the first half of Season 3, and in the penultimate episode of Season 3 it is revealed he was arrested in Germany. He has been replaced since by a similar character named Udo.

=== Harper Kubelick ===
Dr. Harper Kubelick (Kat Foster) is a young pediatrician whom Hank dated early in Season 4. They break up when Hank chooses to stay with a patient "just in case" there was something wrong with her (she was fine) instead of going to Harper's family reunion. When Hank called, Harper said, "She must be happy you were there to support her" to which Hank ritually replies, "Yeah".

=== Viviana Torres ===
Viviana Torres (Martha Higareda) is a bartender whom Jeremiah has feelings for throughout Season 6. Initially, Divya is afraid that Viviana is using Jeremiah, but she realizes that Jeremiah and Viviana both like each other. Viviana eventually leaves the Hamptons to pursue a degree in Tulsa, resulting in a tearful goodbye in front of the local courthouse.

=== Ray Mazzarino ===
Ray Mazzarino (Jeremy Davidson) is a businessman who recently moved to the Hamptons in Season 6. He enlists the help of Paige to help redesign his house to impress his significant other. He also becomes involved in the lives of Evan and Hank; for Hank, he is a patient, and for Evan, he is his partner. Ray helps Evan create Hank Lab which is used instead of the hospital. His last appearance was the ending of Season 6.
