= Jill Flint =

American actress (born 1977)

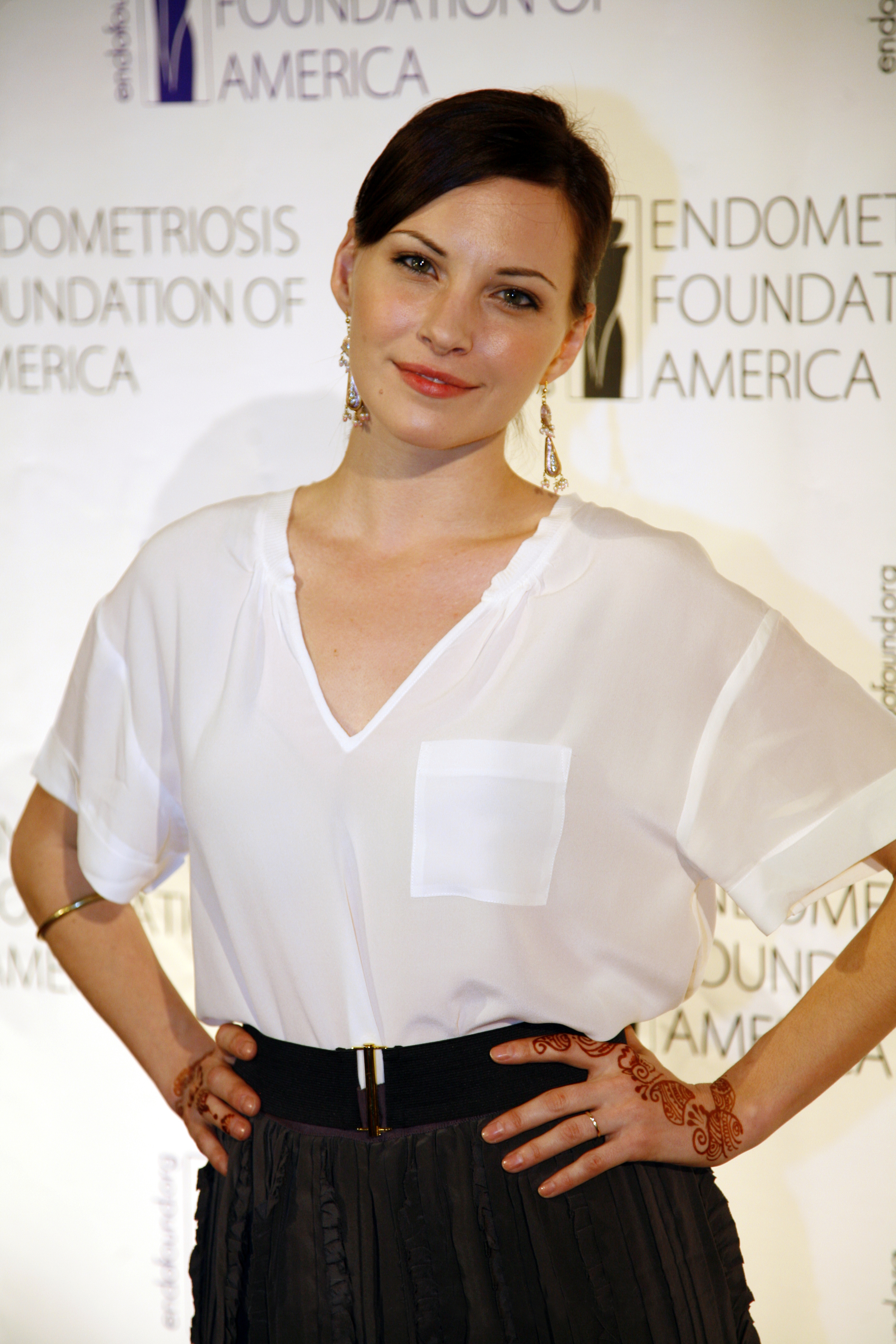
- Born: November 25, 1977 (age 48)
- Occupation: Actress
- Years active: 2004–present

Jill Flint (born November 25, 1977) is an American television and film actress, best known for her role of Jill Casey in the USA Network TV series Royal Pains, and as the popular character Lana Delaney on CBS' award-winning series The Good Wife. She also played one of the lead characters, Dr. Jordan Alexander, in the NBC medical drama The Night Shift, and had a recurring role on Bull as Diana Lindsay.

== Career ==
Flint has appeared in several feature films including Cadillac Records with Adrien Brody, and The Women. She appeared as Bex on Gossip Girl. She was a series regular in USA Network's hit series Royal Pains. She was also seen as recurring character FBI Agent Lana Delaney on The Good Wife (CBS). She starred on The Night Shift (NBC) as Dr. Jordan Alexander from 2014 to 2017. She also appeared as the on-again, off-again romantic interest to Dr. Jason Bull on the CBS series Bull.

== Filmography ==
=== Film ===
Year	Title	Role	Notes
2004	Garden State	Obnoxious Girl	
2006	Johnny Montana	Elevator woman	Uncredited
2007	On Broadway	Kate O'Toole	
2008	What Just Happened	Lou's Secretary	Uncredited
2008	The Women	Annie	
2008	Cadillac Records	Shelly Feder	
2009	How I Got Lost	Vincent	
2011	Fake	Kelly Monaghan	
2012	The Amazing Spider-Man	Receptionist	
2018	The Mule	Pam	Uncredited
2022	Grey Elephant	Lucy	
2024	Carry-On	Congresswoman Grace Turner	

=== Television ===
Year	Title	Role	Notes
2005	Law & Order: Trial by Jury	Karen Masters	Episode: "The Abominable Showman"
2006	Conviction	Lisa Sandorff	3 episodes
2006	Law & Order: Criminal Intent	Trisha	Episode: "The War at Home"
2007	Six Degrees	Lisa Crane	Recurring role, 5 episodes
2007–2009	Gossip Girl	Bex Simon	4 episodes
2008	Blue Blood	Kara	Television film
2009	Nurse Jackie	Melissa Greenfield	4 episodes
2009–2014	The Good Wife	Lana Delaney	12 episodes
2009–2012, 2016	Royal Pains	Jill Casey	Main role, 49 episodes; Recurring, 4 episodes
2010	Mercy	Simone Sands	3 episodes
2012	CSI: Miami	Elle Toring	Episode: "Last Straw"
2013	Elementary	Alysa Darvin/Elle Basten	Episode: "Snow Angels"
2014–2017	The Night Shift	Dr. Jordan Alexander	Main role, 45 episodes
2016–2022	Bull	Diana Lindsay	7 episodes
2019	Wu-Tang: An American Saga	Monica Lynch	3 episodes
