= Mark Feuerstein =

American actor (born 1971)

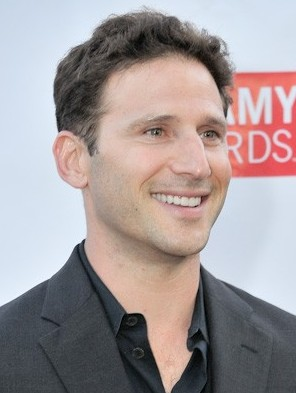
- Feuerstein in 2009
- Born: June 8, 1971 (age 55)
- Education: Princeton University
- Alma mater: London Academy of Music and Dramatic Art; École Philippe Gaulier
- Occupation: Actor
- Years active: 1995–present
- Spouse: Dana Klein (m. 2005)
- Children: 3

Mark Feuerstein (/ˈfɔɪ.ərˌstiːn/; born June 8, 1971) is an American actor. He had an early, recurring role on the NBC sitcom Caroline in the City, playing the title character's boyfriend, and later gained notice in a guest appearance on an episode of Season 2 of Sex and the City. Following Caroline in the City, he went on to star on three NBC sitcoms–Fired Up, Conrad Bloom, and Good Morning, Miami. He also made appearances on Ally McBeal (2000), Once and Again (2000–2001), The West Wing (2001–2005), Nurse Jackie (2015), Prison Break (2017), and Wet Hot American Summer: Ten Years Later (2017).

He starred on the hit USA series Royal Pains (2009–2016), and also co-wrote, co-produced, and starred on the CBS sitcom 9JKL (2017–2018). In 2022, he received a Children's and Family Emmy Award for Outstanding Lead Performance nomination for his work on the Netflix series The Baby-Sitters Club.

His film roles include Practical Magic (1998), What Women Want (2000), In Her Shoes (2005), and Defiance (2008).

== Early life and education ==
Feuerstein is the son of Audrey, a school teacher, and Harvey Feuerstein, a lawyer. He was raised in a Jewish family, and celebrated his Bar Mitzvah in an Orthodox synagogue. He was a wrestler in high school and won the state championship. Feuerstein attended the Dalton School, and graduated from Princeton University in 1993. He won a Fulbright scholarship and studied at the London Academy of Music and Dramatic Art and under Philippe Gaulier at École Phillipe Gaulier in France.

== Career ==
Feuerstein got his breakthrough on television guest-starring as Officer Phil on the daytime soap opera Loving. When director Nancy Meyers was casting What Women Want, her daughter recognized Feuerstein from Practical Magic (1998), and insisted that her mother cast him.

He came to public attention in a guest appearance in an episode of Season 2 of Sex and the City entitled "They Shoot Single People, Don't They?", playing an ophthalmologist named Josh who has sex with Miranda (played by Cynthia Nixon) but fails to give her an orgasm, despite repeated attempts and Miranda's coaching tips. The episode concludes with Miranda realizing that Josh will never satisfy her sexually and decides to fake her orgasm one last time. Josh punches the air with pride and yells "I'm the man!", while Miranda privately resolves to avoid him in the future. Feuerstein has publicly expressed regret for taking the role and has referred to it as his most-hated performance.

Feuerstein had a recurring role in Season 3 of The West Wing as a lawyer, and returned in the same role in Season 6. Feuerstein reunited with Practical Magic co-star, Sandra Bullock as her love interest in the film Two Weeks Notice (2002), but his scenes were deleted from the film. He was named one of People's "50 Most Beautiful People" in 2003. In January 2009, Feuerstein began appearing in the web series The Hustler on Crackle.

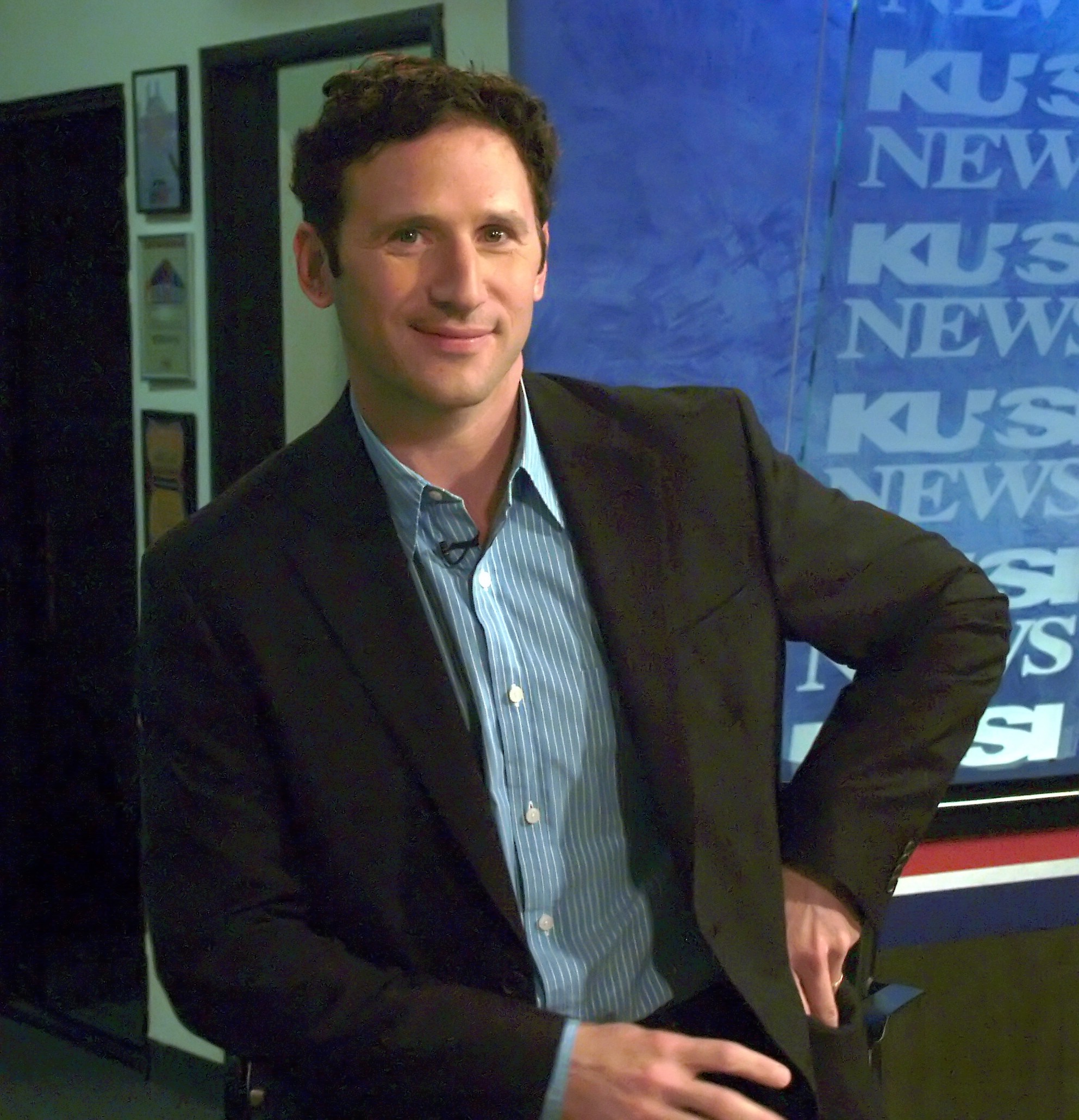
Feuerstein in 2009

Feuerstein starred in the lead role on the USA Network television show Royal Pains, from 2009 to 2016. He appeared as the super guest host of the June 14, 2010, edition of WWE Raw to promote the Royal Pains episode "Keeping the Faith".

In spring 2017, Feuerstein appeared as rogue CIA operative Jacob Ness in the Fox revival of its original hit series Prison Break.

Feuerstein co-created, with his wife, Dana Klein, and stars in the CBS sitcom 9JKL, which debuted in October 2017. Upon release, it received negative reviews from critics, with a 13% approval rating on Rotten Tomatoes. On May 12, 2018, the series was canceled after one season.

== Personal life ==
Feuerstein married television writer Dana Klein in 2005. They live in Los Angeles and have three children.

== Filmography ==
=== Film ===
| Year | Title | Role | Notes |
|---|---|---|---|
| 1998 | Practical Magic | Michael | Film debut |
| 1999 | Giving It Up | Ralph Gagnate | |
| 1999 | The Muse | Josh Martin | |
| 1999 | 30 Days | Actor | |
| 2000 | Rules of Engagement | Tom Chandler | |
| 2000 | Woman on Top | Cliff Lloyd | |
| 2000 | What Women Want | Morgan Farwell | Nominated—Blockbuster Entertainment Award for Favorite Supporting Actor—Comedy/Romance |
| 2002 | Abandon | Robert Hanson | |
| 2002 | Three Days of Rain | Car Buyer | |
| 2002 | Balkanization | Matt Harding | Short film |
| 2002 | Two Weeks Notice | Rich Beck | Scenes deleted |
| 2005 | In Her Shoes | Simon Stein | |
| 2006 | The Wedding Weekend | Greg | |
| 2006 | Lucid | Case | Short film |
| 2008 | Blessed Is the Match: The Life and Death of Hannah Senesh | Antoine Tissandier/Yoel Pagli (voice role) | Documentary |
| 2008 | Defiance | Isaac Malbin | |
| 2010 | Knucklehead | Eddie Sullivan | |
| 2010 | Love Shack | Marty Sphincter | Direct-to-video |
| 2013 | Artists Writers Softball Game Commercial | Unknown role | Short film |
| 2014 | Life Partners | Casey | |
| 2014 | In Your Eyes | Philip Porter | |
| 2015 | Meadowland | Rob | |
| 2015 | Larry Gaye: Renegade Male Flight Attendant | Larry Elizabeth Gaye | Also producer |
| 2016 | Baked in Brooklyn | Businessman | |
| 2017 | Last Night in Rozzie | Ronnie Russo | Short film Northeast Film Festival Award for Best Actor in a Short Film; Philadelphia Independent Film Festival Award for Best Actor in a Short Film; Nominated—Hill Country Film Festival Award for Best Actor; Nominated—SoHo International Film Festival Award for Best Lead Actor in a Short Film |
| 2019 | Babysplitters | Dr. Cooper, MFT | |
| 2025 | Guns & Moses | Rabbi Moses Zaltzman | |

=== Television ===
| Year | Title | Role | Notes |
|---|---|---|---|
| 1995–1996 | Loving | Officer Phil | Unknown episodes |
| 1996–1997 | Caroline in the City | Joe DeStefano | television debut 8 episodes; recurring role |
| 1997–1998 | Fired Up | Danny Reynolds | Series regular, all 28 episodes |
| 1998 | Conrad Bloom | Conrad Bloom | Main role, all 13 episodes; Also Producer |
| 1999 | Sex and the City | Josh | Episode: "They Shoot Single People, Don't They?" |
| 2000 | Ally McBeal | Hammond Deering | Episode: "Pursuit of Loneliness" |
| 2000 | An American Daughter | Morrow McCarthy | Television movie |
| 2000–2001 | Once and Again | Leo Fisher | 5 episodes; recurring role |
| 2001 | The Heart Department | William "Bump" Daley | Television movie |
| 2001–2005 | The West Wing | Clifford Calley | 7 episodes; recurring role Nominated – Online Film & Television Association Award for Best Guest Actor in a Drama Series (2002) |
| 2002–2004 | Good Morning, Miami! | Jake Silver | Main role, all 39 episodes; Also Producer |
| 2005 | The Closer | Dr. Jerome | Episode: "Flashpoint" |
| 2005 | Law & Order | Eric Speicher | Episode: "Bible Story" |
| 2006 | Masters of Horror | Alex O'Shea | Episode: "Pro-Life" |
| 2006 | 3 lbs | Dr. Jonathan Seger | 7 episodes; recurring role |
| 2007 | Shark | Mitchell Latimer | Episode: "Porn Free" |
| 2007 | Dance Man | unknown role | Television movie |
| 2009 | The Hustler | The Hustler | Main role, 11 episodes also Director/Executive Producer/Writer |
| 2009–2016 | Royal Pains | Dr. Henry "Hank" Lawson | Main role, all 104 episodes Co-producer of 16 episodes, producer of 29 episodes, co-executive producer of 16 episodes Director of 5 episodes |
| 2014 | Friends with Better Lives | Simon | Episode: "Something New" |
| 2015 | Nurse Jackie | Barry Wolfe | 5 episodes; recurring role |
| 2016 | One & Done | Boxout Bernie | Episode: "Temple Four" |
| 2017 | Prison Break | Jacob Anton Ness | 9 episodes; recurring role |
| 2017 | Wet Hot American Summer: Ten Years Later | Mark | 8 episodes; recurring role |
| 2017–2018 | 9JKL | Josh | Main role, all 16 episodes Creator, writer, executive producer |
| 2018 | BoJack Horseman | Himself (voice) | Episode: "BoJack the Feminist" |
| 2019 | Law & Order: Special Victims Unit | Dr. Heath Barron | Episode: "Plastic" |
| 2019 | Better Things | Himself | Episode: "The Unknown" |
| 2020-2021 | It's Pony | Mr. Pancks | Voice role, 7 episodes |
| 2020 | Power | Steven Ott | 2 episodes |
| 2020–2023 | Power Book II: Ghost | Steven Ott | 11 episodes |
| 2020–2021 | The Baby-Sitters Club | Watson Brewer | Main role Nominated – Children's and Family Emmy Award for Outstanding Lead Performance |
| 2021 | Coyote | Frank | 3 episodes |
| 2022 | The Good Fight | Henry Callas | Episode 3: "The End of Football" |
| 2022 | Law & Order | Devon Miller | Episode: "Only the Lonely" |
| 2024 | Hotel Cocaine | Burton Greenberg | 8 episodes |
