= Royal Pains =

American medical comedy-drama television series

- Genre: Comedy drama; Medical drama
- Created by: Andrew Lenchewski; John P. Rogers
- Starring: Mark Feuerstein; Paulo Costanzo; Reshma Shetty; Brooke D'Orsay; Ben Shenkman; Jill Flint; Campbell Scott
- Opening theme: "Independence" performed by The Blue Van
- Composer: James S. Levine
- Country of origin: United States
- Original language: English
- No. of seasons: 8
- No. of episodes: 104 (list of episodes)

Production
- Executive producers: Carol Flint; Constance M. Burge; Paul Frank; Rich Frank; Jeff Kwatinetz; Michael Rauch; Andrew Lenchewski
- Production locations: Long Island, New York
- Camera setup: Film; single-camera
- Running time: 42 minutes
- Production companies: 34 Films; Prospect Park; Universal Cable Productions; Open 4 Business Productions

Original release
- Network: USA Network
- Release: June 4, 2009 – July 6, 2016

Royal Pains is an American comedy-drama television series that ran on the USA Network from 2009 to 2016. The series is based in part on contemporary concierge medicine practices of independent doctors and companies and follows Hank Lawson, an unfairly discredited but brilliant diagnostic surgeon, who moves to the Hamptons with his brother Evan as he works as a concierge doctor to the uber rich and ultra elite. The cast of the show includes Mark Feuerstein, Paulo Costanzo, Reshma Shetty, Brooke D'Orsay, Ben Shenkman, Jill Flint, and Campbell Scott.

== Cast and characters ==
=== Main ===
- Mark Feuerstein as Dr. Henry "Hank" Lawson, a formerly successful New York E.R. doctor, who is fired from his job after a wealthy hospital benefactor dies in his care, while he is looking after a sicker patient. When he saves someone's life during a trip to the Hamptons, he accepts an offer from Boris, a German businessman, to remain as a "concierge doctor" in his palatial estate. He usually attends to wealthy clientele, but also others in need of care and often without the means to pay. According to the episode "Keeping the Faith", he and his brother are Jewish.
- Paulo Costanzo as Evan Roth Lawson, Hank's younger brother. He is an accountant and self-appointed CFO of HankMed. Evan's job is to promote the HankMed business, at times using strategies that Hank finds inappropriate or too commercial. At the end of season 4, he marries Paige, the adopted daughter of a wealthy, conservative military man who is running for the United States Congress. When Boris buys Hampton Heritage hospital in Season 7, he becomes a member of the board and the hospital's acting administrator.
- Reshma Shetty as Divya Katdare, Hank's physician assistant. She proposes the idea of a concierge practice and is invaluable to Hank. She initially has to keep her medical career a secret from her parents. Forced by her parents into an arranged betrothal to a childhood friend, she has broken free of their control and is living on her own. As of season 6, Divya has a daughter named Sashi, but is involved in a bitter custody dispute with Sashi's father Rafa.
- Jill Flint as Jill Casey (seasons 1–4; recurring, season 8), Hank's on again/off again girlfriend and an administrator at Hamptons Heritage. Jill works with Hank to open a free clinic while also running the local community hospital. In the fourth season, she leaves the Hamptons to do relief work in Africa.
- Brooke D'Orsay as Paige Lawson (seasons 4–8; recurring, seasons 2 & 3), Evan's wife. Paige is the daughter of a wealthy, conservative former military officer with political aspirations who initially does not think Evan is good enough for his daughter. Paige and Evan meet when she hires him to play her pretend boyfriend, but their pretend relationship soon blossoms into a real one. She pursues a career in Art and soon becomes a curator for art collectors in the Hamptons. In the season 4 episode "Who's Your Daddy?", she is revealed to be adopted, and in the season 4 two-part finale/special "Off-Season Greetings", she and Evan marry.
- Ben Shenkman as Dr. Jeremiah Sacani (seasons 5–8; recurring, season 4), was hired by Evan to be Hank's replacement during Evan and Hank's temporary halt to their business partnership; Sacani stayed on when Hank and Evan made peace. He is an accomplished researcher and excels at his work, although he has limited social skills and an awkward bedside manner. Sacani is an heir to a vast fortune. He and Divya become best friends. She moves into his house in Season 6 when she is facing financial troubles and is pregnant with Sashi. Their friendship is almost broken when Divya meddles in and almost destroys Sacani's relationship with a woman named Viviana. In season 7, Sacani is conned out of a great deal of money from a former fellow college classmate.
- Campbell Scott as Boris Kuester von Jurgens-Ratenicz (seasons 4 & 5; recurring, seasons 1–3 & 6–8), a wealthy and titled German businessman who offers Hank and Evan his guest house, and is Hank's first client. Boris has a genetic disease he is determined will die with him, and which he fights with equal determination. He often seeks rare or risky treatments. Used to getting what he wants, Boris has a rigid code of conduct, which at times puts him at odds with Hank. In season 3 he has a son, Carlos, with his wife Marissa. In Season 6, he buys Hampton Heritage hospital, stating that he intends to settle permanently in the Hamptons. He persuades Hank, Evan, Divya and Jeremiah to become members of the hospital's board of directors but has a secret agenda.

=== Recurring ===
- Henry Winkler as Eddie R. Lawson, Hank and Evan's loving, ne'er-do-well father who left the boys when they were young. Accused of embezzlement, Eddie served a short term in prison and is now on parole, a best-selling author and has been rebuilding his relationship with his sons and his new-found daughter Emma.
- Anastasia Griffith as Dr. Emily Peck, an arrogant rival doctor who works with (and becomes briefly involved with) Hank. Emily is hired to substitute for Hank while he makes an extended visit to Cuba with Boris, and soon comes into conflict with Divya because of her arrogance and her detached approach to her patients.
- Michael B. Silver as Ken "Killer" Keller, a sports agent and Hank's former high school bully. While Hank is initially hostile to him they develop a mutual respect and friendship. By season 5 Keller has joined HankMed as the practice's lawyer.
- Tom Cavanagh as Jack O'Malley, a pro golfer who was featured in the season-two episode "Mulligan" and later became a recurring character in season 3, as his friendship with Hank became more pronounced. Jack died in the season 3 episode "Hank and the Deep Blue Sea", which caused Hank to develop emotional trauma.
- Kyle Howard as Dr. Paul Van Dyke (nicknamed "P.V.D."), a staff doctor at Hampton's Heritage; Divya first meets him while moonlighting at the hospital. After a brief flirtation between Divya and him, Evan hires him as one of Hank's replacements during the temporary halt to the business partnership between Hank and Evan. Van Dyke's personality is very energetic and impulsive, which has gotten him into awkward situations professionally and socially. Van Dyke later joins the new HankMed. He had a pet rabbit of which he was very fond. He also has a slightly older fraternal twin brother named Daniel (nicknamed "D.V.D.").
- Anna George as Rubina Katdare, Divya's reserved and loyal mother. She follows the traditions of a traditional Indian housewife, a sympathetic ear to Divya's frustrations and a bridge to Divya's father. When Divya's father disowns her, Rubina secretly keeps a relationship with Divya. She is eventually inspired by Divya to follow her heart, which causes her to leave her husband and travel the world.
- Ajay Mehta as Devesh Katdare, Divya's strict and straitlaced father. He disowns Divya when she cancels her wedding with Raj (Rupak Ginn), but they reconcile once she becomes his nurse after he nearly drowns.
- Willa Fitzgerald as Emma Lawson, the half sister of Evan and Hank Lawson. She traveled to the Hamptons to find her biological father.
- Ryan McCartan as Cinco Phillips; he is treated by Hank and later comes into conflict with Emma.

== Episodes ==
Season	Episodes	Originally released	
Season	Episodes	First released	Last released
1	12	June 4, 2009	August 27, 2009
2	18	June 3, 2010	February 24, 2011
3	16	June 29, 2011	February 22, 2012
4	16	June 6, 2012	December 16, 2012
5	13	June 12, 2013	September 11, 2013
6	13	June 10, 2014	September 2, 2014
7	8	June 2, 2015	July 21, 2015
8	8	May 18, 2016	July 6, 2016

== Location ==
Principal production of the show's pilot occurred in the Hamptons. However, other locations throughout Long Island were used, with Oheka Castle being the most prominent. Although actually located 60 miles to the west, in Huntington, Oheka served as the Hamptons home of Boris, the German nobleman who offers his guest house to Hank and Evan. In later episodes, exterior and aerial shots of Oheka are used to introduce scenes in the guest house.

In one episode, a Long Beach drive-through convenience store, Dairy Barn, was used as a fictional hot dog stand; a sign can be seen in the opening of that scene. Also, several scenes were shot on the bay side of Point Lookout. Other places used as fictional Hamptons locations include Northport Village in the Town of Huntington, Old Westbury Gardens, Freeport's Nautical Mile, which served as the exterior and parking lot of Hampton Heritage Hospital (in one scene, Freeport's charter coat can be seen across the bay) Caumsett State Historic Park and Oyster Bay Town Hall, which was transformed into the entrance of the Hamptons Heritage Hospital emergency room. Catalina Beach Club in Atlantic Beach, New York was transformed for the pilot episode into the fictional Hampt Inn, the hotel Hank and Evan stayed in upon their arrival in the Hamptons. Downtown Locust Valley, another haunt of the wealthy on Long Island's Gold Coast, plays downtown East Hampton in at least one episode (where Evan and Paige go shopping), with interior shots in a store as well as street scenes. Other areas of filming include Roslyn, New York and Manhasset, New York, where the North Hempstead, New York Town Hall was used as a police station.

For several beach scenes, West Neck Beach (Huntington) was used and a food shopping scene was filmed in Southdown Market in Huntington. Huntington Hospital was used for Hamptons Heritage Hospital.

Two episodes of the second season take place in Cuba, but were filmed in Puerto Rico. The third episode (Lawson Translation) of the fifth season is set and was also shot in Budapest, Hungary.

Both Lawson and his girlfriend Casey drive identical Saab 900 convertibles.

== Development and production ==
The pilot was filmed on location on Long Island, New York in the spring and fall of 2008. The pilot was directed by Jace Alexander, who also filmed the pilot of Burn Notice, another USA Network show, which aired in the hour before Royal Pains. Andrew Lenchewski wrote the pilot and Rich and Paul Frank executive-produced the project, with Lenchewski co-executive producing and John P. Rogers producing. The series was then picked up for a 12-episode season.

== Awards and nominations ==
Awards and nominations for Royal Pains
Year	Award	Category	Recipient(s)	Result
2012	Young Artist Awards	Best Performance in a TV Series—Guest Starring Young Actress 14–16	Sami Gayle	Nominated
2012	People's Choice Awards	Favorite Cable TV Comedy	Royal Pains	Nominated
2013	ASCAP Awards	Top Television Series	Royal Pains	Won
2016	GLAAD Awards	Outstanding Individual Episode	Royal Pains	Won

== Reception ==
Royal Pains has become one of the highest-rated shows on cable. The series premiere was watched by 5.57 million viewers, the highest series premiere for the USA Network since Psych in 2006. With episodes two and three watched by 5.59 million and 6.5 million viewers, respectively, it was the first show in five years to have viewership increase from week two to week three.

=== Ratings ===
Season	Timeslot (ET)	# Ep.	Premiered		Ended		TV Season	Viewers (in millions)
Season	Timeslot (ET)	# Ep.	Date	Premiere Viewers (in millions)	Date	Finale Viewers (in millions)	TV Season	Viewers (in millions)
1	Thursday 10:00 p.m. (June 4 – August 27, 2009)	12	June 4, 2009	5.57	August 27, 2009	5.90	2009	7.47
2	Thursday 10:00 p.m. (June 3 – August 26, 2010); Thursday 9:00 p.m. (January 20 – February 24, 2011)	18	June 3, 2010	5.84	February 24, 2011	4.05	2010–2011	7.33
3	Wednesday 9:00 p.m. (June 29 – August 31, 2011); Wednesday 10:00 p.m. (January 18 – February 22, 2012)	16	June 29, 2011	5.00	February 22, 2012	3.16	2011–2012	6.56
4	Wednesday 9:00 p.m. (June 6 – September 19, 2012); Sunday 9:00 p.m. (December 16, 2012)	16	June 6, 2012	3.95	December 16, 2012	3.25	2012	5.67
5	Wednesday 9:00 p.m. (June 12 – September 11, 2013)	13	June 12, 2013	3.68	September 11, 2013	3.75	2013	TBA
6	Tuesday 9:00 p.m. (June 10 – September 2, 2014)	13	June 10, 2014	2.38	September 2, 2014	1.78	2014	TBA
7	Tuesday 9:00 p.m. (June 2 – July 21, 2015)	8	June 2, 2015	1.67	July 21, 2015	1.57	2015	TBA
8	Wednesday 9:00 p.m. (May 18 – July 6, 2016)	8	May 18, 2016	TBA	July 6, 2016	TBA	2016	TBA

== Home media ==
Universal Pictures Home Entertainment released the first season of Royal Pains in Region 1 on May 25, 2010, and released it in Region 4 on August 25, 2010. Season 2 was released in Region 1 on May 17, 2011. A DVD released on January 3, 2012, contained the first 10 episodes of the third season. The complete series is also available on iTunes.

The complete series was released on DVD by Mill Creek Entertainment on September 22, 2020.

Title	Region 1	Region 2	Region 4	Bonus Features
Season 1	May 25, 2010	July 26, 2010	August 25, 2010	Deleted Scenes; Gag Reel; Commentary; Paulo's Video Blogs; Dr. Irv Danesh: The Real Doctor of Royal Pains; "High Top Fade Out" (Psych, episode 4.07)
Season 2	May 17, 2011	August 12, 2013	March 28, 2012	Deleted Scenes; Gag Reel; Commentary; Guest Starring; Location, Location, Location
Season 3	January 3, 2012 (Vol 1); May 29, 2012 (Vol 2)	August 5, 2013		Deleted Scenes; Gag Reel; Commentary (Region 1 Only)
Season 4	May 7, 2013	July 6, 2015		
Season 5	September 23, 2014	July 6, 2015		
Season 6	April 28, 2015			
Season 7	April 26, 2016			
Season 8	July 19, 2016			

== Books ==
From 2011 to 2012, D.P. Lyle published two novels based on the television series, under Signet Books' Obsidian imprint.

Title	Author	ISBN	Publication date
First, Do No Harm	D.P. Lyle, M.D.	0451234146	June 7, 2011
Sick Rich	D.P. Lyle, M.D.	0451235533	January 3, 2012

== Legal issues ==
On July 6, 2010, actor Hayden Christensen and his older brother Tove Christensen filed a lawsuit against USA Network in a Manhattan Federal Court. In the suit, the brothers claimed to have pitched USA Network an idea for a new television series, called Housecall, which involved a concierge doctor who made house calls to the rich and famous. The two brothers also claimed that a USA Network executive told them, "prior to learning about Housecall, he was unaware of concierge doctors and that he thought it was a fascinating idea." A USA Network spokeswoman declined to comment on the lawsuit. On May 10, 2011, a Manhattan judge ruled not enough evidence was available to justify a breach-of-contract claim because the claim concerns "materials that are not copyrightable, such as ideas." The decision was reversed on appeal in June 2012, the court holding that Christensens' claims were not pre-empted by copyright law. The opinion stated, "There are several qualitative differences between such a contract claim and a copyright violation claim," and added that sister appellate circuits recently had come to this same conclusion. The case was settled in May 2013, with no details made public.
