= Rupak Ginn =

Indian American actor

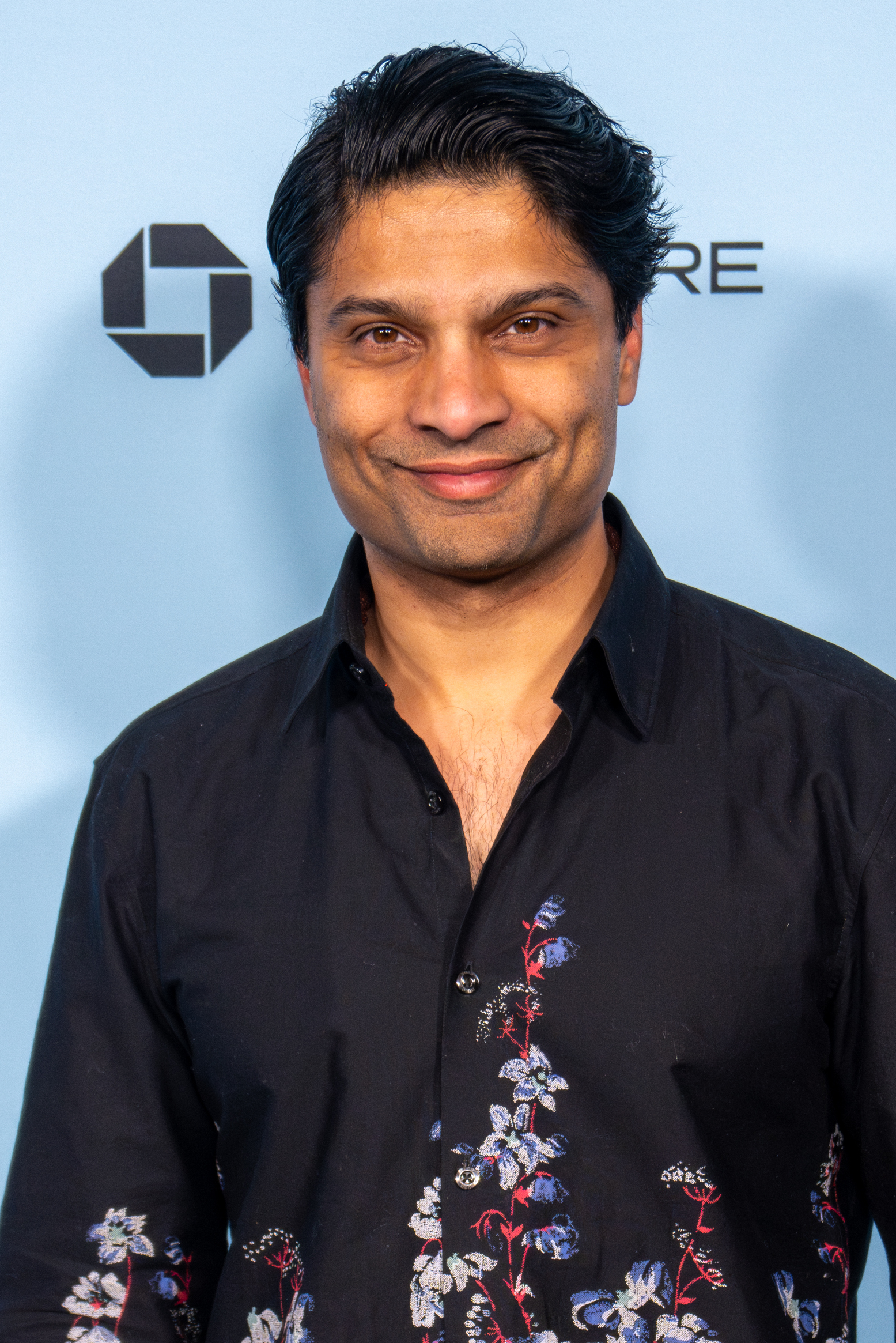
- Ginn at the 2025 Sundance Film Festival
- Born: January 24, 1983 (age 43); San Francisco, California, US
- Other name: Rupak Bhattacharya
- Education: Harvard University (BA); Columbia University (MBA)
- Occupation: Actor
- Known for: The Cheetah Girls: One World; Royal Pains; Spice Road
- Spouse: Nancy Redd (m. 2007)
- Children: 2

Rupak Ginn (born January 24, 1983) is an American actor of Indian descent. He is perhaps best known for his roles as actor Rahim Khan in the third Cheetah Girls film One World and as Raj Bandyopadhyay in Royal Pains. Ginn is currently the host of the 2023 PBS series Spice Road, directed by Sami Khan.

== Early life and education ==
Ginn was born in San Francisco and raised in New York City by Indian immigrant parents, where he attended The Collegiate High School. He graduated from Harvard University in 2005 with a bachelor's degree in English literature, followed by an MBA from Columbia University.

== Personal life ==
Ginn is married to author and former Miss Virginia Nancy Redd. They have two children, a son named August and a daughter also named Nancy.
