= Paulo Costanzo =

Canadian actor (born 1978)

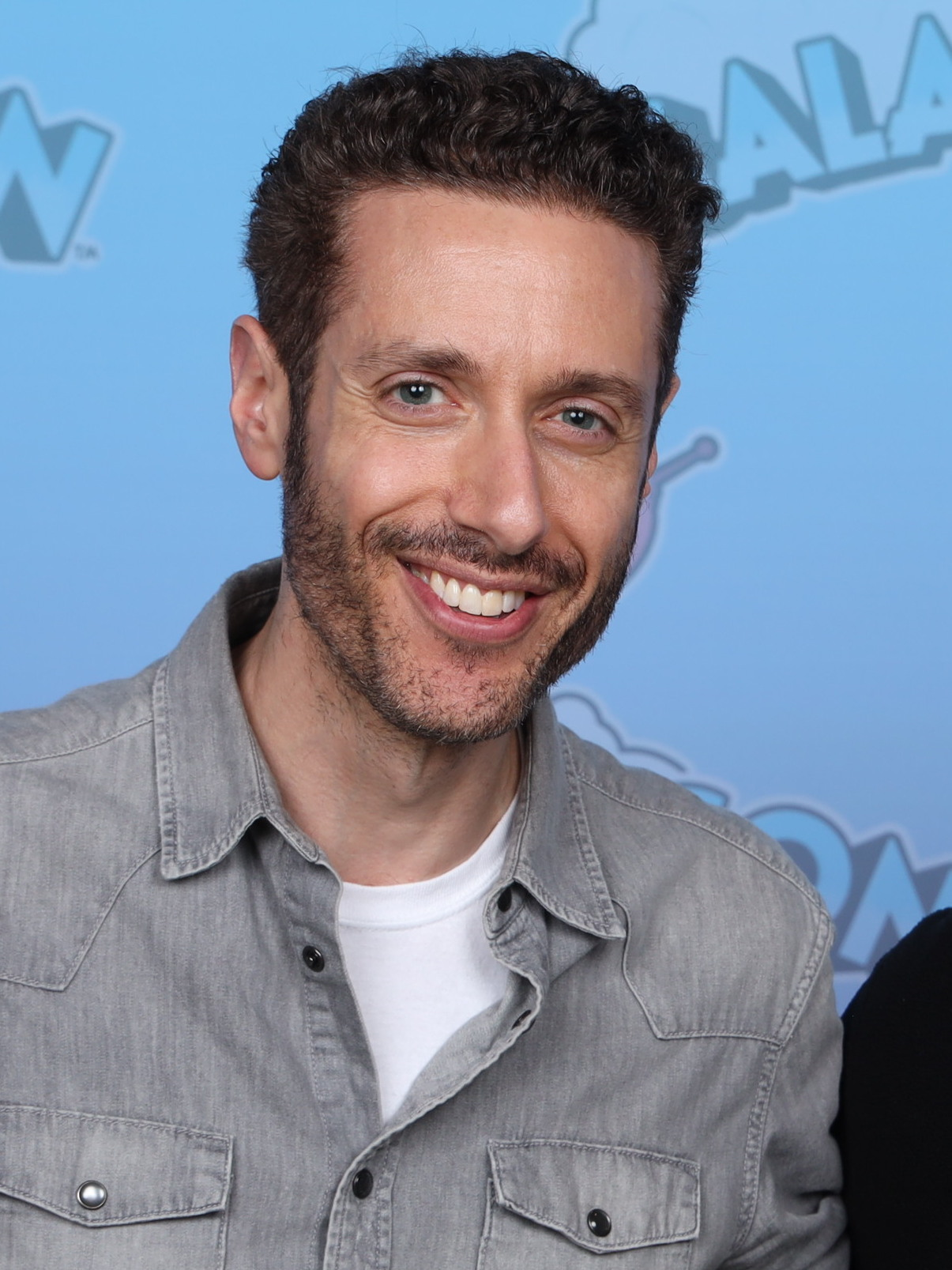
- Costanzo in 2023
- Born: September 21, 1978 (age 47); Brampton, Ontario, Canada
- Occupation: Actor
- Years active: 1997–present

Paulo Costanzo (born September 21, 1978) is a Canadian actor. He is best known for playing Aximili-Esgarrouth-Isthill (Ax) in the TV series Animorphs, the roles of Rubin Carver in the comedy film Road Trip, Alexander Cabot in Josie and the Pussycats, Michael Tribbiani in the NBC sitcom Joey, Evan R. Lawson in the USA Network series Royal Pains, and Lyor Boone in the ABC political drama Designated Survivor.

== Early life ==
Costanzo was born in Brampton, Ontario. His mother is a singer-songwriter and his father an artist of Italian descent.

== Career ==
In 2004, Costanzo was cast in the role of Joey Tribbiani's nephew in the Friends' spinoff Joey, which he played over both seasons.

In 2017, he was cast in a series regular role in the second season of ABC's Designated Survivor as White House political director Lyor Boone.

In 2022, Costanzo appeared in the role of Matteo in the second season of Amazon's comedy series Upload.

== Selected filmography ==
=== Film ===
List of film appearances, with year, title, and role shown
Year	Title	Role	Notes
2000	Road Trip	Rubin Carver	
2001	Josie and the Pussycats	Alexander Cabot	
2001	Gypsy 83	Troy	
2002	40 Days and 40 Nights	Ryan	
2003	Scorched	Stuart 'Stu' Stein	
2003	A Problem with Fear	Laurie	
2004	The Tao of Pong	Hank	Also producer
2006	Dr. Dolittle 3	Cogburn the Rooster	Voice role
2006	Puff, Puff, Pass	Tenant No. 1	
2006	Everything's Gone Green	Ryan	
2007	The Day the Dead Weren't Dead	Deputy Sandbrooks	Short film
2008	Splinter	Seth Belzer	
2010	A Beginner's Guide to Endings	Jacob 'Cob' White	
2013	How to Be a Man	Gary	
2013	That Burning Feeling	Adam Murphy	
2024	Guns & Moses	Sid Barofsky	

=== Television ===
List of television appearances, with year, title, and role shown
Year	Title	Role	Notes
1997	The Don's Analyst	Young Vito	Television film
1998	My Date with the President's Daughter	Arthur	Television film
1998	Rescuers: Stories of Courage: Two Couples	Yaakov/Gaston	Television film; segment: Marie Taque
1998–1999	Animorphs	Aximili-Esgarrouth-Isthill	Recurring role; 19 episodes
1999	Seasons of Love	Eugene	2 episodes
1999	Psi Factor: Chronicles of the Paranormal	Tony D'Angelo	Episode: "Nocturnal Cabal"
2004–2006	Joey	Michael Tribbiani	Main role
2008	The More Things Change...	Nesby Phelps	Television film
2009–2016	Royal Pains	Evan R. Lawson, CFO of HankMed	Main role
2014	Criminal Minds	Shane Wyeth	Episode: "The Black Queen"
2015	The Expanse	Shed Garvey	Main role (season 1); 4 episodes
2016	The Night Of	Ray Halle, CPA	Miniseries; main role
2017	The Good Fight	Keith Fisk	Episode: "Stoppable: Requiem for an Airdate"
2017–2018	Designated Survivor	Lyor Boone	Main role (season 2); 22 episodes
2019	FBI	Spencer Briggs	Guest role (season 1)
2022	Upload	Matteo	Recurring role (season 2)
2026	Twenty Twenty Six	Nick Castellano	Main role

=== Video games ===
List of video game appearances, with year, title, and role shown
Year	Title	Voice role	Notes
2005	50 Cent: Bulletproof	Matt, the Morgue Attendant	
