= Ben Shenkman =

American actor (born 1968)

- Shenkman in 2026
- Born: September 26, 1968 (age 58); New York City, U.S.
- Education: Brown University (BA); New York University (MFA)
- Occupation: Actor
- Years active: 1993–present
- Spouse: Lauren Greilsheimer (m. 2005)

Ben Shenkman (born September 26, 1968) is an American actor. He is known for his roles in the comedy-drama series Royal Pains and the acclaimed HBO miniseries Angels in America, which earned him both Primetime Emmy Award and Golden Globe Award nominations.

== Early life and education ==
Shenkman was born to a Jewish family in New York City, the son of Katherine, who was an associate at a law firm, and Shepard A. Sheinkman, who worked for a consulting company. After graduating from Brown University, in 1993 he obtained a Master of Fine Arts degree from New York University's Graduate Acting Program at the Tisch School of the Arts.

== Career ==
He began his professional acting career with a small role in the 1994 film Quiz Show directed by Robert Redford and a guest-starring role on Law & Order, his first of seven appearances throughout the run of the show. He also began working in theatre, portraying Louis Ironson in Tony Kushner's play Angels in America at San Francisco's American Conservatory Theater. While still at New York University, Shenkman played the role of Roy Cohn in a workshop production of the play. He would reprise the role of Louis seven years after playing the role at ACT in the HBO miniseries adaptation, earning Emmy and Golden Globe nominations.

Throughout the 1990s, Shenkman combined work in off-Broadway productions in New York with small roles in films such as Eraser (1996), The Siege (1998), π (1998), and Jesus' Son (1999), Chasing Sleep (2000), and Requiem for a Dream (2000). In 2000, Shenkman gained success in the theatre, co-starring with Mary-Louise Parker in the Manhattan Theatre Club production of Proof, for which he received a 2001 Tony nomination. After the release of HBO's Angels in America miniseries, he returned to Manhattan Theatre club in 2004 in Sight Unseen opposite Laura Linney.

As his career continued, Shenkman moved between studio films such as Must Love Dogs (2005) and Just Like Heaven (2005), and independent movies such as Then She Found Me (2008), Brief Interviews with Hideous Men (2008), and Breakfast with Scot (2008), a gay-themed film made in Canada for which the NHL notably endorsed the use of a team's logo and uniforms. In 2010, he appeared with Michael Douglas in Solitary Man and the Sundance premiere Blue Valentine.

He also acted on TV as a series regular in the 2008 Julianna Margulies legal drama Canterbury's Law on Fox, and in recurring roles on Grey's Anatomy, Burn Notice, Damages, Drop Dead Diva, and FX's Lights Out. He co-starred in the short-lived NBC sitcom The Paul Reiser Show, which was a midseason replacement for the 2010–11 television season.

In 2012, he joined USA network's Royal Pains as the recurring character Dr. Jeremiah Sacani, and was promoted to series regular the following season, the show's fifth. In the fall of 2015, the series wrapped production of its final season, which aired in the summer of 2016. In 2015, Shenkman also was on Broadway opposite Larry David, and later Jason Alexander, in David's hit comedy Fish in the Dark, which had a sold-out six-month limited run at the Cort Theater.

Since 2016 Shenkman has played the recurring role of Ira Schirmer on the Showtime series Billions. That year also saw him as Desk Sgt. Klein in the acclaimed HBO limited series The Night Of. The following year, 2017, he was cast as a series regular in the Shondaland drama For the People, which aired for two seasons on ABC until 2019. In 2020, in addition to Billions' fifth season, he is featured in a recurring role on Season 10 of HBO's Curb Your Enthusiasm, and as defense counsel Leonard Weinglass in Aaron Sorkin's film The Trial of the Chicago 7.

== Personal life ==
Shenkman married Lauren Greilsheimer in 2005.

== Filmography ==
=== Film ===
Year	Title	Role	Notes
1994	Quiz Show	Childress	
1996	Eraser	Reporter	
1997	Camp Stories	Yehudah	
1998	Pi	Lenny Meyer	
1998	The Siege	INS Agent Howard Kaplan	
1999	Thick as Thieves	Veterinarian	
1999	Jesus' Son	Tom	
1999	30 Days	Jordan Trainer	
2000	Joe Gould's Secret	David	
2000	Requiem for a Dream	Dr. Spencer	
2000	Chasing Sleep	Officer Stewart	
2000	Bed		Short film
2000	Table One	Scott	
2002	Personal Velocity: Three Portraits	Max	
2002	Roger Dodger	Donovan	
2002	People I Know	Radio announcer (voice)	
2002	Stella Shorts 1998–2002	Hans	
2004	Waking Dreams	Charles	Short film
2005	Must Love Dogs	Charlie	
2005	Just Like Heaven	Brett	
2006	Americanese	Steve	
2007	Then She Found Me	Dr. Freddy Epner	
2007	Breakfast with Scot	Sam	
2009	Brief Interviews with Hideous Men	Subject #14	
2009	Solitary Man	Peter Hartofilias	
2010	Blue Valentine	Dr. Sam Feinberg	
2010	Love Shack	Skip Blitzer	
2011	The Key Man	Martin	
2013	Breathe In	Sheldon	
2013	Concussion	Graham Bennet	
2020	The Trial of the Chicago 7	Leonard Weinglass	
2022	Forty Winks	Daryl Camacho	
2024	Christmas Eve in Miller's Point	Lenny	

=== Television ===
Year	Title	Role	Notes
1993	Law & Order	Mark Ferris	Episode: "Born Bad"
1996	New York Undercover	Gabe Green	Episode: "Sympathy for the Devil"
1999–2009	Law & Order	Nick Margolis	6 episodes
2000	Law & Order: Special Victims Unit	Max Knaack	Episode: "Chat Room"
2001	Ed	Frank Carr	2 episodes
2003	Ed	Andy Bednarik	Episode: "Frankie"
2003	Angels in America	Louis Ironson / The Angel Oceania	Miniseries; 6 episodes
2005	Law & Order: Trial by Jury	Irv Kressel	2 episodes
2005	Stella	Carl	Episode: "Meeting Girls"
2006	Love Monkey	Scott	5 episodes
2007	Wainy Days	Clovie	Web series; episode: "My Turn"
2008	Canterbury's Law	Russell Krauss	Main cast; 6 episodes
2009	Grey's Anatomy	Rob Harmon	3 episodes
2009	Private Practice	Rob Harmon	Episode: "Ex-Life"
2009	Burn Notice	Tom Strickler	4 episodes
2010	Damages	Curtis Gates	11 episodes
2011	Lights Out	Mike Fumosa	5 episodes
2011	The Paul Reiser Show	Jonathan	Main cast; 2 episodes
2011	Drop Dead Diva	Dr. Bill Kendall	5 episodes
2012	Made in Jersey	Andrew Treaster	Episode: "Pilot"
2012–16	Royal Pains	Dr. Jeremiah Sacani	Recurring role (season 4); Main role (seasons 5–8); 45 episodes
2016	The Night Of	Sgt. Klein	2 episodes
2016–23	Billions	Ira Schirmer	39 episodes
2018–19	For the People	Roger Gunn	Series regular
2020	Curb Your Enthusiasm	Roger Swindell	3 episodes
2020–25	FBI	John Reynolds	4 episodes
2022	The Good Fight	Ben-Baruch	3 episodes
2026	Love Story	Edwin Schlossberg	6 episodes

== Awards and nominations ==
Year	Award	Category	Nominated work	Result
2001	Tony Award	Best Featured Actor in a Play	Proof	Nominated
2003	Online Film & Television Association Awards	Best Supporting Actor in a Motion Picture or Miniseries	Angels in America	Nominated
2004	Golden Globe Awards	Best Supporting Actor – Series, Miniseries or Television Film	Angels in America	Nominated
2004	Gold Derby Awards	Best Miniseries/TV Movie Supporting Actor	Angels in America	Nominated
2004	Primetime Emmy Awards	Outstanding Supporting Actor in a Limited Series or Movie	Angels in America	Nominated
