= Brooke D'Orsay =

Canadian actress

- Born: February 17, 1982 (age 44); Toronto, Ontario, Canada
- Occupation: Actress
- Years active: 2001–present

Brooke D'Orsay (born February 17, 1982) is a Canadian actress, best known for voicing the character of Caitlin Cooke on the Teletoon animated series 6teen (2004–2010) and Brooke Mayo in the 2005 movie King's Ransom (2005), as Paige Collins-Lawson on Royal Pains and as Kate on Two and a Half Men. She played Deb on the Lifetime original series Drop Dead Diva and was in the Nickelodeon original movie The Boy Who Cried Werewolf (2010) as Paulina Von Eckberg.

Since 2017, D'Orsay has become known for her performances in Hallmark Channel's Countdown to Christmas made-for-TV films. She also acted in a 2012 movie How to Fall in Love as Anni, a broke waitress/event planner who helps a high school friend as a 'dating coach' and falls in love in the process.

== Early life ==
Brooke D'Orsay was born on February 17, 1982, in Toronto, Ontario to Alan D'Orsay. She has a brother John and two stepbrothers from her father's subsequent marriage to Darla; Greg and Timothy, the latter of whom died in 2020. The D'Orsay family name is of Huguenot French origin where she is of French ancestry.

== Career ==
Her first major acting role was in 2001, in the movie Why Can't I Be a Movie Star? as Jennifer Kruz. D'Orsay followed with several roles in television: Ellen in Doc, Justine in Soul Food and Felicity Fury in four episodes of Ace Lightning.

D'Orsay voiced Caitlin Cooke on the Teletoon animated series 6teen. She appeared on The Big Bang Theory as Christy in the episode "The Dumpling Paradox" and How I Met Your Mother as Margaret in the episode "The Stinsons". D'Orsay was the "Nestea Girl" in a long-running commercial for Nestea's "Nestea Plunge" campaign. She had a main role on Gary Unmarried as Sasha, the head boss of the sports radio network in which the series takes place.

D'Orsay played Deb Dobkins, the dead model, in the Lifetime series Drop Dead Diva and was a cast member on the USA Network series Royal Pains as Paige Collins, wife of HankMed CFO Evan R. Lawson. She also starred in the Nickelodeon original movie The Boy Who Cried Werewolf (2010) as Paulina Von Eckberg and played Kate, Walden Schmidt's girlfriend, in a recurring role on Two and a Half Men in 2012–2014. She has recently starred in several Hallmark Channel TV movies.

Since 2017, D'Orsay has become known for her performances in Hallmark Channel's Countdown to Christmas made-for-TV films. She also acted in a 2012 movie How to Fall in Love as Anni, a broke waitress/event planner who helps a high school friend as a 'dating coach' and falls in love in the process.

== Filmography ==
=== Film ===
Year	Title	Role	Notes
2001	Why Can't I Be a Movie Star?	Jennifer Kruz	
2002	Truths of Insanity	Girl	Short film
2002	19 Months	Sandy	
2002	Fortune's Sweet Kiss	Cassandra	
2003	Home Security	Lisa	Short film
2003	The Republic of Love	Mother #3	
2004	The Skulls III	Veronica Bell	Video
2004	Harold & Kumar Go to White Castle	Clarissa	
2005	King's Ransom	Brooke Mayo	
2006	Room 10	Jessica	Short film
2006	It's a Boy Girl Thing	Breanna Bailey	

=== Television ===
Year	Title	Role	Notes
2002	Doc	Ellen	Episode: "All in the Family"
2002	Soul Food	Justine	Episode: "Lovers and Other Strangers"
2002	Everybody's Doing It	Caroline	Television film (MTV)
2003	My Life as a Movie	Brenda Dellacasa	Television film
2003	Beautiful Girl	Eve Kindley	Television film (ABC)
2003	Wild Card	Heather Robbins	Episode: "Bullet Proof"
2004	Then Comes Marriage	Jenna	Television film (The WB)
2004	Braceface	Lanie (voice)	Episode: "Clean Slate"
2004	Ace Lightning	Felicity Fury	Recurring role (4 episodes)
2004	Medical Investigation	Melissa Getemer	Episode: "Team"
2004–2010	6teen	Caitlin Cooke (voice)	Main role (93 episodes)
2005	Life on a Stick	Nancy	Episode: "Breaking Away"
2005	Corner Gas	Carol	Episode: "The Littlest Yarbo"
2006	Happy Hour	Heather Hanson	Main role (13 episodes)
2007	Wildlife		Television film (NBC)
2007	Two and a Half Men	Robin	Episode: "Young People Have Phlegm Too"
2007	The Big Bang Theory	Christy Vanderbel	Episode: "The Dumpling Paradox"
2008	Five Year Plan	Darcie	Television film (NBC)
2009	Single White Millionaire	Angela Becker	Television film (CBS)
2009	Psych	April MacArthur	Episode: "Six Feet Under the Sea"
2009	How I Met Your Mother	Margaret	Episode: "The Stinsons"
2009–2010	Gary Unmarried	Sasha	Main role (17 episodes)
2009–2011	Drop Dead Diva	Deb Dobkins	Recurring role (9 episodes)
2010	The Boy Who Cried Werewolf	Paulina Von Eckberg	Television film (Nickelodeon)
2010–2016	Royal Pains	Paige Collins	Main role (55 episodes)
2011	Smothered	Gillian	Television film (ABC)
2012	How to Fall in Love	Annie Hayes	Television film (Hallmark)
2012–2014	Two and a Half Men	Kate	Recurring role (7 episodes)
2014	June in January	June Fraser	Television film (Hallmark)
2017	Miss Christmas	Holly Khun	Television film (Hallmark)
2017	9JKL	Natalie	Episode: "Lovers Getaway"
2018	Christmas In Love	Ellie Hartman	Television Movie (Hallmark)
2019	Nostalgic Christmas	Anne Garrison	Television Movie (Hallmark)
2020	Grace and Frankie	Chelsea	Episode: "The Funky Walnut"
2020	Hot for My Name	Esther's Cousin	Television Movie (Happy Madison Productions)
2020	A Godwink Christmas: Second Chance, First Love	Margie Southworth	Television Movie (Hallmark)
2021	Beverly Hills Wedding	Molly Machardy	Television Movie (Hallmark)
2021	A Dickens of a Holiday!	Cassie Pruitt	Television Movie (Hallmark)
2022	Wedding of a Lifetime	Darby	Television Movie (Hallmark)
2022	A Fabled Holiday	Talia	Television Movie (Hallmark)
2023	A Not So Royal Christmas	Charlotte	Television Movie (Hallmark)
2024	Crimes of Fashion: Killer Clutch	Lauren Elliott	Television Movie (Hallmark)
2024	Following Yonder Star	Abby Fontaine	Television Movie (Hallmark)
2024	Deck the Halls on Cherry Lane	Rebecca	Television Movie (Hallmark)
2025	Oy to the World!	Nikki Roberts	Television Movie (Hallmark)
