= Sachs/Judah Productions =

American film and television production company

Sachs/Judah Productions is a film and television production company owned by Gabe Sachs and Jeff Judah. It was formed after the two produced the Postcards from America pilot for HBO.

It was originally set up at Studios USA on July 17, 2001. The company had several pilots like Homeward Bound that didn't get past the pilot stage. It set up network projects on November 11, 2002, with deals at NBC and ABC, most notably for sitcom project commitments. The company moved its offices to Touchstone Television on June 9, 2004, for a two-year production agreement.

== Films ==
- Diary of a Wimpy Kid
- Diary of a Wimpy Kid: Rodrick Rules

== TV series ==
- Life as We Know It
- What About Brian (first season only)
- 90210
- The Night Shift

== TV pilots ==
- Street Match
- Pranks
- Jen Y
- The Two of Us
- Postcards from America
- Homeward Bound
- In the Game
