= List of Freaks and Geeks characters =

The following is a list of characters from the American television series Freaks and Geeks. The show focuses on two groups of high school outcasts: the Freaks, who are described as "burnouts", and the Geeks, who play Dungeons & Dragons and are athletically challenged.

== Weirs ==
=== Lindsay Weir ===
Lindsay Weir, played by Linda Cardellini, is the elder of the two Weir siblings and serves as the protagonist of the series. She is a precocious teen who has a strong bond with her friend Millie Kentner. She pursued her scholastic career at McKinley High School with vigor and quickly established herself as a bright and thoughtful student, with exceptional academic achievements garnering recognition from her peers and teachers as well as being a standout member of the Mathletes.

After the death of her grandmother, whom she considered the most upstanding and kindest person she had ever known, Lindsay begins to feel adrift, questioning the accepted norms of religion and social structures, which had previously given her a sense of purpose and security. She became an atheist after the last words her grandmother were that she saw "nothing” and that she was unhappy and afraid of dying.

According to her brother, not long after this Lindsay started hanging out with the "burnouts" or "freaks," who are known for being rebellious and less academically focused, a far cry from the expectations of her family and old friends, including her friend Millie.

=== Sam Weir ===
Samuel Harold Weir, portrayed by the American actor and film producer, John Francis Daley, is Lindsay Weir's younger brother. He is shorter and less physically developed than many of his peers and is often shy and timid when socialising with anyone other than his two closest friends and his family. With only a few exceptions, Sam usually sticks to manners and expectations that are consistent with the conventional middle class American values held by his family.

He finds solace in the common interests he has with his close friends Bill and Neal. They enjoy the comedy of Bill Murray and Steve Martin and TV shows like Saturday Night Live together and debate the merits of different science fiction universes. These interests combined with difficulty with social interaction has left Sam and his friends being labelled as "geeks."

Sam was selected as the son for "The Perfect TV Family" by Entertainment Weekly.

=== Harold Weir ===
Harold Weir—played by Joe Flaherty—is the head of the Weir household. While frequently stern and strict, he is a loving father who looks out for the best interests of his children. Even as he lectures his kids about bad role models and sometimes doles out unreasonable punishments, he has a good sense of humour and enjoys seeing his family happy.

Harold owns and works at A1 Sporting Goods. Despite its doing steady business, he worries about the potential impact of the encroaching megastores.

Harold's greatest concern is his children. He believes Lindsay is falling in with a bad crowd, and he has a strong distaste for her "burnout friends," although he later takes a shine to Nick by letting him stay at the Weirs' house when he has nowhere else to go, introducing him to legendary drummers Buddy Rich and Gene Krupa, and encouraging him to practice his own drumming.

=== Jean Weir ===
Jean Weir, portrayed by Becky Ann Baker, is a devoted mother and wife who often overlooks her own needs for the sake of the Weirs.

She provides for her family, especially when it comes to making meals and ensuring her kids' well-being, as well as giving them guidance and advice whenever they need it, even though sometimes she is oblivious to the issues her children are facing. They gather around the dinner table every evening and engage in meaningful conversation, something Jean cherishes deeply.

== Freaks ==
=== Daniel Desario ===
Daniel Desario, played by James Franco, is a cool and charismatic burnout. Daniel is usually known at McKinley High School for two things: being with his girlfriend Kim Kelly and/or skipping class. He is somewhat selfish and very manipulative but often pulls through to help his friends, and is the leader of the freaks. Daniel hides the fact that he is eighteen years old and has been held back two grades in school. Also, Daniel plays guitar. His rebellious and anarchistic view of society often lead him into trouble. Though he is socially confident and acts apathetic towards his schoolwork, Daniel is secretly insecure about the fact that he does not do well in school, and doesn't think he is smart enough to succeed.

=== Nick Andopolis ===
The character Nick Andopolis, played by Jason Segel, is a drum-playing "freak". He is a frequent marijuana user who loves Led Zeppelin. He is from Chippewa, Michigan. At the end of the series, Nick reveals his love of disco music and dancing. In 2024, Segel said in an interview with GQ that he imagined that his character later joined the military and died in action.

=== Ken Miller ===
Ken Miller, played by Seth Rogen, is wise-cracking and sarcastic. Whenever Ken opens his mouth, it is usually to let out a biting quip at the expense of someone around him. He has been friends with Daniel Desario since elementary school and later develops a relationship with Amy Andrews. He is very stubborn and doesn't back down from fights (in one episode, when asked if "he wants to go," he replies "I always wanna go!" as well as moshing enthusiastically in "Noshing and Moshing").

=== Kim Kelly ===
Kim Kelly, played by Busy Philipps, is Daniel's on-and-off girlfriend throughout the series. Kim is a tough, short-tempered girl and is known by the other students for having sex, doing drugs and being tough in a fight.

== Geeks ==
=== Bill Haverchuck ===
Bill Haverchuck, played by Martin Starr, is the geekiest of the geek gang. Bill is tall for his age, skinny and wears large glasses. Bill is unpretentious and somewhat immature, with an understated sense of humour. He remains the most mild-mannered and introverted of the three Geeks.

=== Neal Schweiber ===
Neal Schweiber, played by Samm Levine, is a self-proclaimed comic genius and ladies' man. Unlike Sam and Bill, Neal is usually very outgoing and often wants to be the centre of attention. He is Jewish, and humorously notes that he was once elected treasurer of his class when "I didn't even run!" He has an unrequited crush on Lindsay, and is dismayed (in Noshing and Moshing) when he sees her kissing his older, college-student brother Barry. He has an abundant amount of confidence and charisma, though it garners him no more respect or reputation than Sam or Bill.

== Other students ==
- Natasha Melnick as Cindy Sanders, Sam's crush and a popular cheerleader. Sam and Cindy are strictly friends for most of the series. Sam tries many different things to get Cindy's attention, but all it does is bring them closer as friends. Cindy begins dating Todd Schellinger, the star basketball player, but it does not go well. Sam is often Cindy's go-to person to vent about her frustrations with Todd.
- Sarah Hagan as Millie Kentner, Lindsay's geeky and highly religious former best friend and next door neighbour. During the first half of the series, Millie struggles to keep Lindsay on the right track. She often looks out for her, such as assisting Lindsay in babysitting when Lindsay was too high on marijuana to function.
- Jerry Messing as Gordon Crisp, a friend of the geeks. Despite being overweight and having chronic body odour from trimethylaminuria, Gordon tends to be optimistic and take things in stride. Gordon was assigned to be Sam's lab partner in the beginning of the series. Gordon is aware of his big size and agrees with Harris when he says that "the world loves jolly, fat guys."
- Stephen Lea Sheppard as Harris Trinsky, a calm and sensible 15-year-old who gives good advice to the other students. Harris is the guru of the Geeks (and occasionally some of the Freaks). Harris is sarcastic in a dry way, and is well aware of it.
- Chauncey Leopardi as Alan White, the bully who torments Sam, Neal, and Bill; the reason is revealed in "Chokin' and Tokin'" after he nearly kills Bill in a practical joke gone wrong: he secretly enjoys science fiction and comic books, but was rejected by the geeks in his efforts to befriend them when they were younger.
- Joanna García as Vicki Appleby, the domineering head cheerleader. Throughout most of the series, Vicki is short-tempered and impatient with everyone around her. However, Vicki shows her nice side in rare moments, such as talking to Eli about Three's Company and showing compassion over Bill's coma.
- Riley Smith as Todd Schellinger, Cindy's jock boyfriend. Todd is introduced as a mildly mysterious character. At first, you only see him through Sam or Cindy's eyes from a distance. It wasn't until Sam became a mascot that we see Todd and Cindy kiss. Later in the episode, Todd is shown to be a nice person, talking to Sam as if they were friends.
- Kayla Ewell as Maureen Sampson, a transfer student to William McKinley High School since her family moved from Florida to Michigan. ("Carded and Discarded") Maureen befriends Sam, Neal, and Bill, and the three of them show Maureen around the school. The Geeks all like Maureen as she is cute, nice, personable, and enjoys spending time with them.
- Shaun Weiss as Sean. Sean is one of the Freaks. He plays bass in Creation (Daniel, Nick, and Ken's band) and works at a fast food restaurant. Sean can be boorish and grating, but also seems to be somewhat of a diplomat among the students, hanging out with different cliques.
- Jarrett Lennon as Colin, Harris's best friend. ("Pilot Episode") Colin is first shown at Harris's sidekick, but later shown on his own as a hardcore drama student. He auditioned for school mascot with Sam, later exclaiming that Sam only won the role because of politics.
- Lizzy Caplan as Sara. Sara is shown throughout the series as a disco-loving girl who has a crush on Nick.
- Mark Allan Staubach as Mark, a goofy guy who occasionally hangs out with the Freaks. He supplies pot to Nick in "Chokin' and Tokin'".
- Jessica Campbell as Amy Andrews ("Tuba Girl"). Amy is a "friend of a friend" to Lindsay. She is in marching band but is not quite a geek. Amy has a sharp tongue and a sarcastic sense of humour that instantly attracts fellow Freak, Ken. The two begin dating and grow very close.
- Ben Foster as Eli, a mentally disabled student who believes Three's Company is the greatest show ever.
- Jason Schwartzman as Howie Gelfand. ("Carded and Discarded") Howie is an older guy who works retail at a clothing shop. He supplies the freaks fake IDs to get into a show at a bar.
- Shawn Soong as Stroker, a friend of the Freaks. He has very long wavy hair and appears in nearly every episode, but is rarely seen talking.
- Shia LaBeouf as Herbert, the school mascot who wore the McKinley Vikings helmet until he broke his arm and Sam replaced him, later falling into a deep sleep because his misguided mother refused to let him sleep at home out of fear he'd lapse into a post-concussion coma. ("We've Got Spirit")
- Rashida Jones as Karen Scarfoli, Kim's "friend" who bullies Sam by vandalising his locker and writing "Pygmy Geek" in huge letters. She does this while “on the warpath” (looking for a fight) after her boyfriend Ricky (unseen) broke up with her.
- Alex Breckenridge as Shelley Weaver, the head Mathlete whom Lindsay is determined to humiliate for spreading false rumours about Kim, and who later freezes and embarrasses herself at a competition where Lindsay's brilliance wins the day. ("Looks and Books")
- Samaire Armstrong as Laurie, a Deadhead.
- Renee Cohen as Judith, Harris Trinsky's girlfriend. She only has one on-air appearance, where she says, "Oh, Harris! You're so bad," before kissing him. Judith has particular tastes, liking (according to her boyfriend) scented oils and plenty of time with Harris.

== School staff ==
- Dave "Gruber" Allen as Jeffrey "Jeff" Theodore Rosso, the hippie guidance counselor who often serves as a confidant to the main characters. His attempts to appear "cool and hip" often make him seem stupid, and he is shown to occasionally use his position in authoritarian or otherwise inappropriate ways. Nevertheless, he genuinely cares for the students, often identifying their problems and offering cogent advice in an upbeat manner.
- Tom Wilson as Coach Benjamin "Ben" Fredricks, the PE and Health teacher. Though gruff and a bit of a meathead to the geek characters, he can be friendly and seems to be happy in the rare instances when the geeks succeed in class.
- Steve Bannos as Frank Kowchevski, a petty, unpleasant, hot-headed math teacher who has it out for the freak characters, particularly Daniel. He is also the coach of the McKinley Mathletes group.
- Leslie Mann as Miss Foote, the social studies teacher.
- Trace Beaulieu as Hector LaCovara, the science teacher.
- Steve Higgins as Mr. Fleck, the A/V teacher who is well liked by the geeks.

== Other family members ==
- Sam McMurray as Dr. Vic Schweiber, Neal's father. He is initially liked by Neal, Sam, and Bill as he shares their sense of humour and television program favourites. However, they later discover he is cheating on his wife, Neal's mother Lydia, whom he met in college. This news upsets Neal ("The Garage Door").
- Claudia Christian as Gloria Haverchuck, Bill's mother. She raises Bill alone and works as a waitress. She previously worked as a dancer. Gloria blames herself for Bill's many medical problems, hinting that she took drugs and alcohol while pregnant with him. She cares for Bill very much and works hard to give him a good life. ("Chokin' & Tokin'" and "Dead Dogs and Gym Teachers")
- Kevin Tighe as Col. Andopolis, Nick's dad. He is very strict and dislikes his son's so-called musical ambitions. ("Smooching and Mooching")
- David Krumholtz as Barry Schweiber, Neal's charismatic older brother. He is well liked by the group and Neal looks up to him. He attends college in Wisconsin and hasn't chosen a major yet. Although he claims to have been a bigger geek than Neal in high school, he tells Lindsay that he reinvented himself as "the handsome, dashing Jew" once he got on campus. Lindsay is attracted to him and kisses him enthusiastically at his family's party (to the dismay of Neal). ("Noshing and Moshing")
- Amy Aquino as Mrs. Lydia Schweiber, Neal's mom. She is aware of her husband's infidelities and comforts her son by telling him that she has only a few years left with him as her child at home, and plenty of time to deal with her husband in future years. ("The Garage Door"; "Noshing and Moshing")
- Ann Dowd as Cookie Kelly, Kim's mom. ("Kim Kelly is My Friend" and "The Diary") She is depicted as stressed out by the living conditions in their home, her son’s catatonic state, and her daughter’s low grades. Rather than empathise with or bond with her daughter, she becomes suspicious, harsh and critical of her.
- Mike White as Chip Kelly, Kim's alcoholic older brother who was attacked by the police when he was minding his own business and now sleeps on the couch all day because of, according to his mother, "water on the brain." ("The Diary")
