= List of The Night Shift episodes =

The Night Shift is an American medical drama television series created by Gabe Sachs and Jeff Judah that premiered May 27, 2014 on NBC, and the series finale aired on August 31, 2017. The series starred Eoin Macken, Jill Flint, Ken Leung, Brendan Fehr, Daniella Alonso, Robert Bailey Jr., Jeananne Goossen, J.R. Lemon, and Freddy Rodriguez as the staff who work the late night shift in the ER at San Antonio Medical Center. On November 17, 2016, NBC renewed the series for a fourth season, which premiered on June 22, 2017. The series was cancelled on October 13, 2017, after four seasons.

During the course of the series, 45 episodes of The Night Shift aired over four seasons.

== Series overview ==
| Season | Episodes | Originally released | |
| Season | Episodes | First released | Last released |
|---|---|---|---|
| 1 | 8 | May 27, 2014 | July 15, 2014 |
| 2 | 14 | February 23, 2015 | May 18, 2015 |
| 3 | 13 | June 1, 2016 | August 31, 2016 |
| 4 | 10 | June 22, 2017 | August 31, 2017 |

== Episodes ==
=== Season 1 (2014) ===
| No. overall | No. in season | Title | Directed by | Written by | Original release date | US viewers (millions) |
|---|---|---|---|---|---|---|
| 1 | 1 | "Pilot" | Pierre Morel | Gabe Sachs & Jeff Judah | May 27, 2014 | 7.67 |
| 2 | 2 | "Second Chances" | Bill Johnson | Gabe Sachs & Jeff Judah | June 3, 2014 | 6.87 |
| 3 | 3 | "Hog Wild" | Sanford Bookstaver | Corey Evett & Matt Partney | June 10, 2014 | 6.70 |
| 4 | 4 | "Grace Under Fire" | Kevin Dowling | Dailyn Rodriguez | June 17, 2014 | 6.25 |
| 5 | 5 | "Storm Watch" | Eriq La Salle | Bridget Bedard | June 24, 2014 | 5.92 |
| 6 | 6 | "Coming Home" | David Boyd | Janet Lin | July 1, 2014 | 6.87 |
| 7 | 7 | "Blood Brothers" | Martha Coolidge | Zachary Lutsky | July 8, 2014 | 6.36 |
| 8 | 8 | "Save Me" | Vincent Misiano | Gabe Fonseca | July 15, 2014 | 6.05 |

=== Season 2 (2015) ===
| No. overall | No. in season | Title | Directed by | Written by | Original release date | US viewers (millions) |
|---|---|---|---|---|---|---|
| 9 | 1 | "Recovery" | Eriq La Salle | Gabe Sachs & Jeff Judah | February 23, 2015 | 5.52 |
| 10 | 2 | "Back at the Ranch" | Timothy Busfield | Bridget Bedard & Dailyn Rodriguez | March 2, 2015 | 6.13 |
| 11 | 3 | "Eyes Look at Your Last" | Eriq La Salle | Zachary Lutsky | March 9, 2015 | 5.45 |
| 12 | 4 | "Shock to the Heart" | David Boyd | Tawnya Bhattacharya & Ali Laventhol | March 16, 2015 | 5.36 |
| 13 | 5 | "Ghosts" | David Boyd | Tom Garrigus | March 23, 2015 | 5.44 |
| 14 | 6 | "Fog of War" | Jason Priestley | Matthew V. Lewis | March 24, 2015 | 4.04 |
| 15 | 7 | "Need to Know" | Jay Chandrasekhar | Gabe Fonseca | March 30, 2015 | 5.04 |
| 16 | 8 | "Best Laid Plans" | Tara Nicole Weyr | Dennis Saavedra Saldua | April 6, 2015 | 5.53 |
| 17 | 9 | "Parenthood" | David Boyd | Dailyn Rodriguez | April 13, 2015 | 5.52 |
| 18 | 10 | "Aftermath" | Allison Liddi-Brown | Tawnya Bhattacharya & Ali Laventhol | April 20, 2015 | 5.37 |
| 19 | 11 | "Hold On" | Timothy Busfield | Matthew V. Lewis | April 27, 2015 | 4.94 |
| 20 | 12 | "Moving On" | Eriq La Salle | Jon W. Fong | May 4, 2015 | 5.53 |
| 21 | 13 | "Sunrise, Sunset" | Kevin Hooks | Zachary Lutsky & Tom Garrigus | May 11, 2015 | 4.92 |
| 22 | 14 | "Darkest Before Dawn" | Eriq La Salle | Milla Bell-Hart & Gabe Fonseca | May 18, 2015 | 5.20 |

=== Season 3 (2016) ===
| No. overall | No. in season | Title | Directed by | Written by | Original release date | US viewers (millions) |
|---|---|---|---|---|---|---|
| 23 | 1 | "The Times They Are A-Changin'" | Timothy Busfield | Gabe Sachs & Jeff Judah | June 1, 2016 | 4.81 |
| 24 | 2 | "The Thing with Feathers" | Timothy Busfield | Tom Garrigus | June 8, 2016 | 4.18 |
| 25 | 3 | "The Way Back" | Tara Nicole Weyr | Janet Lin | June 15, 2016 | 4.47 |
| 26 | 4 | "Three-Two-One" | Oz Scott | Zachary Lutsky | June 22, 2016 | 4.30 |
| 27 | 5 | "Get Busy Livin'" | Dailyn Rodriguez | Gabe Fonseca | June 29, 2016 | 4.46 |
| 28 | 6 | "Hot in the City" | Darnell Martin | Nicole Rubio | June 29, 2016 | 4.46 |
| 29 | 7 | "By Dawn's Early Light" | Louis Shaw Milito | Brian Anthony | July 6, 2016 | 5.74 |
| 30 | 8 | "All In" | Tara Nicole Weyr | Milla Bell-Hart | July 13, 2016 | 6.28 |
| 31 | 9 | "Unexpected" | Marisol Adler | Janet Lin | July 27, 2016 | 5.32 |
| 32 | 10 | "Between a Rock and a Hard Place" | Jeff Judah | Tom Garrigus & Zachary Lutsky | August 3, 2016 | 5.00 |
| 33 | 11 | "Trust Issues" | Oz Scott | Dailyn Rodriguez | August 3, 2016 | 5.00 |
| 34 | 12 | "Emergent" | Timothy Busfield | Brian Anthony & Gabe Fonseca | August 24, 2016 | 5.52 |
| 35 | 13 | "Burned" | Tara Nicole Weyr | Tom Garrigus | August 31, 2016 | 5.43 |

=== Season 4 (2017) ===
| No. overall | No. in season | Title | Directed by | Written by | Original release date | US viewers (millions) |
|---|---|---|---|---|---|---|
| 36 | 1 | "Recoil" | Marisol Adler | Brian Anthony | June 22, 2017 | 3.59 |
| 37 | 2 | "Off the Rails" | Oz Scott | Tom Garrigus | June 29, 2017 | 4.15 |
| 38 | 3 | "Do No Harm" | Marisol Adler | Milla Bell-Hart | July 6, 2017 | 4.24 |
| 39 | 4 | "Control" | Oz Scott | Joe Hortua | July 13, 2017 | 4.41 |
| 40 | 5 | "Turbulence" | Timothy Busfield | Alan McElroy | July 20, 2017 | 4.23 |
| 41 | 6 | "Family Matters" | Eoin Macken | Tom Garrigus | July 27, 2017 | 4.45 |
| 42 | 7 | "Keep the Faith" | Timothy Busfield | Brian Anthony | August 10, 2017 | 3.09 |
| 43 | 8 | "R3B0OT" | Terrell Clegg | Tom Garrigus & Shannon Sommers | August 17, 2017 | 3.52 |
| 44 | 9 | "Land of the Free" | Gabe Sachs | Francesca Butler | August 24, 2017 | 3.72 |
| 45 | 10 | "Resurgence" | Jeff Judah | Brian Anthony | August 31, 2017 | 3.08 |
