= Life as We Know It (TV series) =

American teen drama television series

- Intertitle
- Genre: Teen drama
- Created by: Jeff Judah; Gabe Sachs
- Based on: Doing It by Melvin Burgess
- Starring: Sean Faris; Jon Foster; Chris Lowell; Missy Peregrym; Jessica Lucas; Kelly Osbourne; Lisa Darr; D. B. Sweeney; Marguerite Moreau
- Opening theme: "Sooner or Later" by Michael Tolcher
- Country of origin: United States
- Original language: English
- No. of seasons: 1
- No. of episodes: 13

Production
- Executive producers: Jeff Judah; Gabe Sachs; Stu Bloomberg
- Running time: 44 minutes
- Production companies: Sachs/Judah Productions; Cabloom! Productions; Touchstone Television

Original release
- Network: ABC
- Release: October 7, 2004 – January 20, 2005

Life as We Know It is an American teen drama television series which aired on ABC during the 2004–2005 season. It was created by Gabe Sachs and Jeff Judah. The series was loosely based on the 2003 novel Doing It by Melvin Burgess.

== Premise ==
Set at the fictional Woodrow Wilson High School in Seattle, Washington, Life as We Know It focuses on three teenage best friends: Dino Whitman, Ben Connor, and Jonathan Fields. Dino is a star ice hockey player whose parents' marriage falls apart when his mother has an affair with his hockey coach. Dino has an uneasy relationship with his girlfriend, Jackie Bradford, a soccer player. Jackie's best friend is Sue Miller, an academic star. Ben becomes interested in Sue, who is unaware he was involved in an affair with a teacher, Monica Young. Jonathan, a clumsy jokester, is teased by Dino for his attraction to the overweight Deborah Tynan.

As part of the show's narrative structure, characters broke the fourth wall by stepping out of the scene — of which the action proceeds behind them in slow motion — and directly addressing the camera.

== Characters ==
=== Regular ===
- Sean Faris as Dino Whitman, lead character and star hockey player
- Jon Foster as Ben Connor, one of Dino's best friends who has a rocky relationship with Sue after his affair with Monica Young
- Chris Lowell as Jonathan Fields, Dino's other best friend who goes out with Jackie's friend Deborah
- Missy Peregrym as Jackie Bradford, Dino's on-and-off girlfriend and the best friend of Sue and Deborah
- Jessica Lucas as Sue Miller, as Ben's on-and-off girlfriend who is best friends with Jackie and Deborah
- Kelly Osbourne as Deborah Tynan, Jonathan's witty British friend turned girlfriend and friend of Jackie and Sue
- Lisa Darr as Annie Whitman, Dino's mother who has an affair with Dino's hockey coach
- D. B. Sweeney as Michael Whitman, Dino's father who leaves his wife after her infidelity with Dino's hockey coach
- Marguerite Moreau as Monica Young, a teacher who has an affair with Ben, one of her students. Sue eventually found out and told her father, who convinced Monica to transfer or she would go to jail

=== Recurring ===
- Evan Smith as Max Whitman, Dino's younger brother
- Sarah Strange as Mia Tynan, Deborah's mother
- Martin Cummins as Coach Dave Scott, Dino's coach who has an affair with Dino's mother Annie
- Jessica Harmon as Zoe

=== Guest stars ===
- Michaela Mann as Emma
- Samantha McLeod as Marissa Becker
- Nick Lashaway as Christopher "Topher" Flynn
- Joshua Close as Matt Gleeson
- Craig Ferguson as Oliver Davies, Deborah Tynan's dad
- James McDaniel as William Miller
- Megan Gallagher as Leslie Miller
- Becky Ann Baker as Amanda Connor
- Dylan Baker as Roland Connor
- Richard Sali as Stuart Fields
- Brenda James as Mary Fields
- Tseng Chang as Science Teacher Mr. Chang
- Sean Whalen as Mr. Parnell
- Jeffrey Nordling as Mike
- Julie Patzwald as Crystal
- Meghan Ory as Greta
- Amanda Crew as Polly Brewer
- Crystal Lowe as Julie
- Josh Meyers as Sam Connor
- Peter Dinklage as Dr. Belber
- Natasha Melnick as Sabrina
- Connie Britton as Dianne
- Samm Levine as Bernard Sachs
- Busy Philipps as Alex
- Ione Skye as Food Stand Woman

== Production ==
The series was created by Jeff Judah and Gabe Sachs, who had previously worked on Freaks and Geeks and Undeclared. ABC greenlit a full series order for the fall season in June 2004. The show was filmed in Vancouver, British Columbia and Seattle, Washington by Sachs-Judah Productions and (ca)bloom!, in association with Touchstone Television, a corporate sibling of ABC, both owned by The Walt Disney Company. The school used for exterior shots, possibly interior as well, is Point Grey Secondary School in Vancouver.

== Broadcast ==
The show premiered on October 7, 2004 in the Thursday 9 p.m. time slot, airing at the same time as NBC's The Apprentice and CBS's CSI: Crime Scene Investigation.

== Episodes ==
No.	Title	Directed by	Written by	Original release date	Prod. code	U.S. viewers (millions)
1	"Pilot"	Michael Engler	Jeff Judah & Gabe Sachs	October 7, 2004	1.1	4.34
Dino wants to have sex with his girlfriend Jackie, but she isn't ready. Jonathan wants to have a secret relationship with Deborah because he is embarrassed of what others might say because she is overweight. Ben is hopelessly infatuated with his teacher, Ms. Young.
2	"Pilot Junior"	Michael Engler	Jeff Judah & Gabe Sachs & Donald Todd	October 14, 2004	1.2	4.22
Dino sees his mother having an affair with his hockey coach. Dino's secret about his parents' marital problems weakens his relationship with Jackie. Jonathan makes a scary discovery and suspects he may have penis cancer. Ms. Young makes a surprising move on Ben.
3	"The Best Laid Plans"	Michael Engler	Allison Adler	October 21, 2004	1.3	3.91
Dino is on a mission to get back together with Jackie. Jackie is now willing to have sex with Dino, but Dino's problem weigh down on him and he leaves. Ben and Ms. Young try to find a way to get some alone time. Deborah admits to Jonathan that she is not a virgin. Jonathan needs to take some time out to deal with the fact that she might be a sexpert while he himself has no experience.
4	"Partly Cloudy, Chance of Sex"	Michael Spiller	Donald Todd	October 28, 2004	1.4	3.77
Dino quits the hockey team in protest of his coach's relationship with his mother Annie, which sparks trouble at home. After Ms. Young convinces Ben to be in the school play, he is devastated when he finds out he's been cast as the male lead with Sue. Jonathan is insecure about his relationship with Deb, and Dino meets a new girl, Zoe.
5	"Secrets and Lies"	Michael Spiller	Melissa Carter	November 4, 2004	1.5	4.02
Dino wants to move to his father's new apartment as his relationship with his mother hits a new low. When things at home get to be too much for Jackie to handle, she turns to a support group for help. Sue throws all her effort into practicing for the play as Ben and Sue realize they work well together. Ms. Young gets possessive with Ben, and Jonathan witnesses something the two kissing afterhours. Jonathan and Deb struggle in their relationship with what they can tell each other while still being loyal to their friends.
6	"Natural Disasters"	Rachel Talalay	Joel Madison	December 2, 2004	1.6	3.45
Dino is feeling overwhelmed at home and considers moving to his father's new apartment, which creates tension with his mother. Meanwhile, Sue is deeply immersed in rehearsing for the school play, determined to perfect her performance, and she and Ben discover they work well as a team, sparking a budding partnership. However, Ms. Young becomes increasingly possessive of Ben, leading Jonathan to secretly witness her kissing him after hours, complicating their friendship. Deb and Jonathan continue to navigate their relationship amid the challenges of loyalty and honesty, while Jackie, overwhelmed by her family's struggles, seeks support from a local group to cope with her stress.
7	"With a Kiss, I Die"	John Peters	Allison Adler	December 9, 2004	1.7	3.20
Dino, feeling torn between his home life and the desire for independence, considers moving in with his father, causing tension with his mother. Sue throws herself into rehearsals for the school play, eager to shine, and teams up with Ben, discovering a strong connection that hints at budding romance. Meanwhile, Ms. Young's increasing possessiveness over Ben raises concerns, especially when Jonathan secretly witnesses her kissing Ben after hours. Deb and Jonathan continue to grapple with honesty and loyalty as they navigate their relationship amidst these challenges.
8	"Family Hard-ships"	Rick Wallace	Adam Horowitz & Edward Kitsis	December 16, 2004	1.8	3.15
The boys are excited to see Ben's big brother, Sam Conner, who's back for the weekend with his Pontiac and cool job as a CD-cover graphic designer; he even got them three VIP invitations. Dino's dad and mom can't afford new, better fiber skates, so Dino convinces Jonathan to find cool jobs in retail, and his good looks help them get hired. Ben's parents forbid him from working, and even his brother's help doesn't get his 11 PM curfew lifted, but he still asks Sue to hang out. Jackie and Deborah decide on a girls' night instead, since Jonathan was busy at the shop; the girls sneak into Dino's place to steal a garment to burn in an effort to 'exorcise' Dino to Jackie. Dino steals Ben's dad's medication, which kicks in during wrestling practice and stays with him. Dino scores with sales colleague Greta but is being set up by his ex, Zoe, who calls him the 'jeans thief', though his mom pays for the trousers. Monica had a fling with Sam, unaware he was Ben's first. Ben has a disagreement with his dad, who wanted him to attend his mother's classical recital and Ben is upset with Sam him for seeing Monica again.
9	"A Little Problem"	Michael Engler	Leila Gerstein	January 6, 2005	1.9	4.15
Deborah's cousin Sabrina is staying a week; the former dog has blossomed to Jonathan's taste. Jackie is going to run for class president, Sue will manage her campaign, rival Ali attacks almost instantly. Mia asks Michael to tell their teenager kids Dino and Deborah if they are getting serious together, he first gets wife Annie's okay in vague terms; when Mia does, Deb is furious and suggests Sabrina to date Dino, to Jonathan's anger, who is relieved Dino won't double date. Dino decks a boy who jocularly insulted his ma; he must take counseling with a midget to avoid suspension and losing the hockey season, finds him cool but won't discuss his real issues. Monica pretends she's still with Ben's brother, Sue overhears him reproach her not to leave him alone, feels betrayed but they soon make up kissing. One look at Sabrina cures Dino's erectile infirmity. Sue's dad William Miller, who is on the teachers' union, scares Monica Young, suggesting she's better off quitting at her own initiative which she does to avoid jail, then tells Ben to stop dating Sue. Dad Michael tells Dino he's trying it with Mia, live with it- the horny jock's penis problem is back, he even comes clean to the counselor.
10	"Breaking Away"	Rodman Flender	Jeff Judah & Gabe Sachs	January 13, 2005	1.10	3.89
11	"You Must be Trippin'"	Paul Holahan	Luvh Rakhe	January 20, 2005	1.11	3.40
12	"Friends Don't Let Friends Drive Junk"	Dan Lerner	Donald Todd	Unaired	1.12	N/A
13	"Papa Wheelie"	Adam Davidson	Joel Madison	Unaired	1.13	N/A

== Reception ==
On review aggregator website Rotten Tomatoes, the series has a rating of 73% based on 22 reviews. The consensus states, "Life as We Know It might be too risqué for some viewers, but the teen drama tackles relationships in a nuanced manner."

Variety called it "a sly, sweet look at high school... so good that you immediately make room on your shelf for the cult-fave DVD because you know this is the kind of show that gets cancelled after five episodes." Writing for Entertainment Weekly, Gillian Flynn also gave a positive review and said the show "revels in off-putting frankness."

John Doyle of The Globe and Mail wrote, "Most TV dramas about teenage life either paint everything in a romantic mist or present the teens as near-savages, existing in the sort of hormone-crazed universe depicted in the American Pie movies. Life as we know it falls somewhere in between. The kids are neither precocious nor too crude. They're self-infatuated, but the realities of the world are revealed to them. This is a coming-of-age drama but it's about formative experiences and not merely adolescent high jinks."

Samantha Bornemann of PopMatters noted that while some of the plot lines verged on predictability, with the Miss Young storyline in particular bringing "the series perilously close to camp", the show "is best during... little moments of communication and revelation [between its characters], allowing the teens to show their instinctual decency even as they prove exceedingly fallible human beings."

The media watchdog group the Parents Television Council protested against Life as We Know It saying that the October 2004 episode was sexually charged.

== Cancellation ==
Life as We Know It was pulled from ABC's lineup during November sweeps, but was rerun on MTV to good ratings in November and December 2004. It was ultimately cancelled by ABC in January 2005, with its final two episodes going unaired. In 2005, the series was released on DVD, which included the two previously unaired episodes. Life as We Know It aired abroad after its American cancellation.

In Brazil the show aired on Sony Entertainment Television starting June 13, 2005 at 7:00pm Tuesdays. In New Zealand, the show premiered in December 2005 on TV2, scheduled against America's Next Top Model. It replaced Veronica Mars, another American import, but was rescheduled after four episodes because of poor ratings. The remaining episodes were rescheduled from their prime-time slot (7:30pm Friday) to midnight Saturday, then pushed back after midnight as the season progressed. The final two episodes were played in reverse order. TV2 repeated the series from the beginning during the third quarter of 2006, just after midnight Thursdays, but again played the final two episodes in reverse order.

Life as We Know It was also shown in the Philippines in the free cable channel Studio 23. While there were reruns after the initial showing, the two DVD episodes weren't released. In Portugal it is shown on SIC Radical cable channel and is popular among teenagers and young adults. In Hong Kong, it is shown on TVB Pearl and in Asia, it is shown on STAR World.

Life as We Know It was also shown in South Africa on M-Net (DStv Channel 101), a subscription funded channel. The show was broadcast in prime-time and was popular. When the series 'ran out', M-Net received a large number of complaints from subscribers on their internet forums. Subsequently, the show was replayed in an 11:00am morning slot in early 2006. Life as We Know It was also broadcast in 2005 on the M-Net Series channel (DStv Channel 104), a channel which is part of the DStv offering. This channel is broadcast via satellite to sub-Saharan Africa.

Life as We Know It showed in Sweden on Kanal 5 during autumn and winter 2006.

In December 2006 (the beginning of the summer non-ratings period), the show began airing in Australia on the Seven Network at 10:30pm Tuesday nights. The show was also sold to FOX8, where it screened at 7:30pm Saturdays. In Ireland RTE2 showed two episodes every Monday (approximately 2:30am) from mid-January 2007. In Norway the show started airing in August 2006, but was cancelled after eight episodes

It was also broadcast in India in the 2007 fall season on the subscription channel Star World, where it ran all the episodes except the two bonus DVD ones. It is being rerun in India in the same channel in the 5:30–6:30 time slot.

Life as We Know It was broadcast from January to March 2005 on Living TV in the UK. The series was later rerun on Living's sister channel Trouble.

== Home media ==
Walt Disney Studios Home Entertainment (formerly Buena Vista Home Entertainment) released the complete series on DVD in Region 1 on August 23, 2005. It included all 13 episodes, 2 of which were unaired, on 3 discs. Bonus features included audio commentaries, deleted scenes, outtakes, and the producer's photo gallery.

DVD name	Ep #	Release date
The Complete Series	13	August 23, 2005
