= Ark (web series) =

- Genre: Internet video, Science-fiction, drama
- Created by: Robbie Thompson
- Based on: Ark by Robbie Thompson
- Written by: Robbie Thompson
- Directed by: Trey Stokes
- Starring: Renee O'Connor; Adam Cardon
- Composer: Jon Vandergriff
- Country of origin: United States
- Original language: English
- No. of seasons: 1
- No. of episodes: 9

Production
- Executive producers: Jeff Judah; Gabe Sachs
- Producer: John F.K. Parenteau
- Cinematography: Laura Beth Love
- Production company: 60Frames

Original release
- Network: Hulu
- Release: July 24, 2010

Ark is a web series set on a mysterious bio-dome spaceship – the Ark. The two main characters, Connie and Daryl, explore the vacant ship trying to learn their fate. The show's episodes run from 3 to 9 minutes in length. Liz Shannon Miller of GigaOM said that Ark has the rare combination of a sci-fi series with great production values and great writing.

All nine episodes are now available on Hulu. In a 2009 interview, Gabe Sachs and Trey Stokes stated that they would like the opportunity to continue this as a web series.
