= The Night Shift (TV series) =

American medical drama television series

- Genre: Medical drama
- Created by: Gabe Sachs; Jeff Judah
- Starring: Eoin Macken; Jill Flint; Ken Leung; Brendan Fehr; Robert Bailey, Jr.; Jeananne Goossen; JR Lemon; Freddy Rodriguez; Daniella Alonso; Scott Wolf; Tanaya Beatty; Luke Macfarlane
- Composer: Fred Coury
- Country of origin: United States
- Original language: English
- No. of seasons: 4
- No. of episodes: 45 (list of episodes)

Production
- Executive producers: Gabe Sachs; Jeff Judah
- Producers: Zach Lutsky; Jill Danton
- Production locations: Albuquerque, New Mexico; San Antonio, Texas (setting)
- Cinematography: Lex duPont; Arthur Albert
- Running time: 43 minutes
- Production companies: Sachs/Judah Productions; Sony Pictures Television

Original release
- Network: NBC
- Release: May 27, 2014 – August 31, 2017

The Night Shift is an American medical drama television series that ran on NBC from May 27, 2014, to August 31, 2017, for four seasons and 45 episodes. The series was created by Gabe Sachs and Jeff Judah, and follows the lives of the staff who work the late night shift in the emergency room at San Antonio Memorial Hospital.

On November 17, 2016, NBC renewed the series for a fourth season, which premiered on June 22, 2017. On October 13, 2017, NBC canceled the series after four seasons.

== Synopsis ==
The series follows the overnight shift at San Antonio Memorial Hospital, where three of the doctors have a connection to the U.S. military. Dr. TC Callahan is a former US Army doctor who initially exhibits PTSD-type symptoms, having watched his brother die right in front of him on the battlefield. He frequently breaks rules and butts heads with his ex-girlfriend and newly appointed head of the night shift, Dr. Jordan Alexander; Scott Clemmens, Chief Of Surgery; and the hospital's administrator, Michael Ragosa. Dr. Topher Zia is a former army doctor, while Dr. Drew Alister is a gay Army doctor still active in the reserves who initially tries to hide his sexual orientation for fear of backlash. Dr. Krista Bell-Hart is a young surgical resident trying to work her way up the ranks, while fellow resident Dr. Paul Cummings works hard to emerge from the shadow of his father, a famous surgeon at Johns Hopkins. The shift's lone psychiatrist, Dr. Landry de la Cruz, briefly works on the night shift.

Jordan is initially in a relationship with Dr. Scott Clemmens, which complicates things when Scott becomes the Chief of Surgery at the hospital and recurrently argues with TC. After a hostage situation that ends in Topher being shot, TC has a breakdown in the ER, and Scott breaks up with Jordan when he realizes she still has feelings for TC. After a cancer scare, Ragosa finds that he can no longer tolerate the stresses of his administrator job, and he quits that position in order to pursue his original dream of becoming a doctor. Meanwhile, TC's and Jordan's relationship quickly escalates, Topher makes his job as Head of Night Shift permanent, Krista, Kenny and a new surgeon become embroiled in a love triangle, and Drew spirals when his boyfriend ends their relationship. Some time later, TC and Topher head to Afghanistan to help an old friend of the latter, and Jordan suffers a stroke from pregnancy complications. In the season 2 finale, Ragosa passes his boards to become a doctor, TC and Jordan break up when she miscarries, Drew and his boyfriend make up, and get married, and Ragosa moves to Dallas to follow his ex-wife and kids.

After some time away, Jordan hires Dr. Shannon Rivera as a replacement for Ragosa. She and Paul quickly strike up a rivalry turned romance. After an incident overseas, Drew and his husband adopt a foster daughter despite numerous setbacks. After a bomb that goes off outside the hospital, Topher discovers the hospital is being sold off to an Insurance Company with plans to turn it into a Plastic Surgery Center. TC returns to Syria to help with the Humanitarian Crisis. In the season 3 finale, Paul's father returns to the hospital to buy it. TC's camp gets hit by mortar fire when he attempts to leave, and Paul's father fires Topher due to his way of running the hospital, and most of the staff quits in protest. A few days later, TC reveals his intentions to remain in Syria, Jordan and Paul's father blackmail each other for the return of the hospital, and he makes Scott and Jordan the head of surgery and the ER, respectively. However, Jordan reveals that Topher and his daughter were killed in a car accident. Despite this, TC remains in Syria, while Drew discovers he must adjust his "act first" mentality due to his new role as a parent. In the series finale, the hospital begins a medical-combat training program, causing Shannon, Paul and TC to question their role at the ER. Kenny gets engaged to Paul's sister, Drew goes to Ranger school, with his husband's blessing, Shannon returns to her clinic on the reservation, Paul goes to Syria, and Scott and Jordan use the program to transform the hospital. In the end, TC tells Jordan he isn't ready to leave.

== Cast and characters ==
=== Main ===
- Eoin Macken as Dr. Thomas Charles "TC" Callahan: A former Army doctor and Ranger from Baltimore who witnessed his brother Thad's death in Afghanistan, and immediately had to decide to donate his heart to a fellow soldier. After being discharged, he returned with PTSD and his relationship with Jordan ended. In the first season, his recklessness and sports betting put him in trouble, especially with Ragosa, and was secretly dating Landry. In the second season, he rekindles his relationship with Jordan, but they break up again after she miscarries. In the third season, he dates Jessica Sanders until he learns of her involvement in the sale of the hospital. Afterwards, he leaves on a humanitarian mission with Syd to Syria, which gets complicated quickly.
- Jill Flint as Dr. Jordan Alexander: TC's girlfriend. In the first season, she becomes Head of the ER night shift and dates Scott Clemmens, but she still has feelings for TC. In season two, she renounces the position and rekindles her relationship with TC, but they break up after she miscarries in the second-season finale. In season four, she becomes Head of the ER night shift again.
- Ken Leung as Dr. Christopher "Topher" Zia (season 1–3): A former army doctor and Ranger and TC's longtime friend, to the point his oldest daughter calls him "Uncle TC". Married with a daughter, his wife gave birth to twin daughters during a storm. In season 2, he becomes head of the ER night shift. In the season 3 finale, he is fired by the new E.R. owner, Dr. Julian Cummings, for being too willing to give high-priced treatments to people who can't pay. In the second episode of the fourth season it's revealed that Topher, along with his oldest daughter, were killed in a car accident (offscreen) after being hit by a drunk driver.
- Brendan Fehr as Dr. Andrew "Drew" Alister: An army doctor still active in the reserves and chief resident. He was an enlisted medic until the army paid for his medical education. He tried to hide his homosexuality until he outed himself when his boyfriend Rick, also in the army, had an accident and Scott was forced to amputate half of his leg. Krista convinced him to be brave for Rick. After a fight and temporary breakup, Drew and Rick got married in the second season. He returns to active service early in the third season, but his actions to save a 15-year-old child bride result in an unwanted early end of deployment. He and Rick later adopt an orphan girl, Brianna.
- Robert Bailey Jr. as Dr. Paul Cummings: A first year surgical resident and Columbia graduate who works hard to emerge from the shadow of his famous father. He is often the butt of the practical jokes by the ER staff.
- Jeananne Goossen as Dr. Krista Bell-Hart (seasons 1–2): A first year surgical resident. She had a crush on Drew until she learns he is gay, but they became good friends afterwards. She later dated Kenny and Joey Chavez.
- JR Lemon as Nurse Kenny Fournette: An ex-college football star who became a nurse after an injury ended his sports career. He has dated multiple staff members and colleagues, including Krista, Gwen, Nurse Diaz and Dr. Bella Cummings (Paul's sister), the latter of whom he marries.
- Freddy Rodriguez as Dr. Michael Ragosa (seasons 1–2): In the first season, he was the newly appointed hospital administrator. Recently separated from his wife, who took their children with her and whom he later divorced, he also suffered from a relapsed tumor that was affecting his vision. In the second season, after his brain cancer surgery, he quit his position to finish his medical studies and became a resident at the hospital. In the third season, it's revealed that he is now a resident in Dallas after his ex-wife moved their children there.
- Daniella Alonso as Dr. Landry de la Cruz: (season 1): A hospital psychiatrist who dated TC until she realized he still had feelings for Jordan.
- Scott Wolf as Dr. Scott Clemmens (recurring seasons 1–2, main seasons 3–4): A trauma surgeon and a recovering alcoholic, he becomes Head of Trauma Surgery in the first season. He dated Jordan in the first season, then TC's sister-in-law Annie in the third season.
- Tanaya Beatty as Dr. Shannon Rivera (seasons 3–4): A Native American doctor whom Jordan recruits to work the Night Shift. She grew up in foster care. Her initial adversarial relationship with Paul flourishes into a romance.

=== Recurring ===
- Esodie Geiger as Nurse Molly Ramos (seasons 1–4).
- Alma Sisneros as Nurse Jocelyn Diaz (seasons 1–4).
- Catharine Pilafas as Nurse Heather Bardocz (seasons 1–3).
- Luke Macfarlane as Rick Lincoln, Drew's army captain boyfriend. While coming home from deployment in Afghanistan, his bus had an accident and Scott was forced to amputate his right leg under the knee. He later becomes a combat trainer. After a fight and temporary breakup, he becomes Drew's husband in the season 2 finale and they adopt an orphaned girl, Brianna, in season 3.
- Merle Dandridge as EMT Gwen Gaskin (seasons 2–3): Jordan's friend who dates Kenny until early in season 3, when she leaves to study law at Georgetown.
- Sarah Jane Morris as Annie Callahan (seasons 2–3; guest season 4): TC's sister-in-law, the widow of his brother Thad. She is a recovering drug addict. In the third season, she dates Scott. In the third episode of season four, she commits suicide by jumping off of a bridge.
- Isaac Kappy as Sean (season 2)
- Adam Rodriguez as Dr. Joey Chavez (season 2): An eccentric surgeon with a tragic past. A former USAF doctor who lost his son.
- James McDaniel as Dr. Julian Cummings (season 2–4): Paul's father and a renowned neurosurgeon. His company buys the E.R. in the third-season finale.
- Briana Marin as Nurse Nina Alvarez (season 3–4).
- Jennifer Beals as Dr. Sydney "Syd" Jennings (season 3; guest season 4). A trauma doctor and Army commander. Drew's superior in Afghanistan, she gets the brunt of his actions and is forced to remain when she was hoping to return to see her daughter. After returning stateside, she decides to move to D.C. to avoid a custody battle with her ex-husband, who is moving there with his new wife. She leaves in a humanitarian mission in Syria with TC not long afterwards. After being captured and nearly killed at the start of season four, she tells TC that she is returning to the U.S. to be with her daughter.
- AnnaLynne McCord as Jessica Sanders (season 3): A pharmaceutical rep who is secretly involved in the sale of the E.R. to an insurance company. She briefly dates TC.
- Kyla Kenedy as Brianna (season 3–): A young teen orphaned in an accident that claims her foster mother's life. After receiving a needed lung transplant, she is adopted by Drew and Rick.
- Elizabeth Sung as Sumei Zia (season 3): Topher's mother.
- Rana Roy as Dr. Amira Renowi (season 4): A civilian volunteer who rescues TC after the bomb explosion that hits Syd and his campsite. After she and TC sleep together, she tells him she is still married, though in the process of divorcing her husband who is in England. She shows up in Texas briefly before returning to Syria.
- Mark Consuelos as Dr. Cain Diaz (season 4: A confident and aggressive nurse who emigrated to the United States from Mexico. It is later revealed that he was a doctor in Mexico, and after being fired for overstepping his duties as a nurse, Jordan hires him as a resident doctor. It is further revealed that he was on the run and he quits working for the hospital with no notice.
- Erica Tazel as Dr. Bella Fournette (née Cummings) (season 4): Paul's urologist sister, who eventually dates and marries Kenny.
- Zeeko Zaki as Duke (Season 4, 2 episodes)

== Episodes ==
Season	Episodes	Originally released	
Season	Episodes	First released	Last released
1	8	May 27, 2014	July 15, 2014
2	14	February 23, 2015	May 18, 2015
3	13	June 1, 2016	August 31, 2016
4	10	June 22, 2017	August 31, 2017

== Production ==
=== Development ===
The series first appeared as part of NBC development slate in October 2011. NBC decided to not go forward with a pilot order. In August 2012, NBC decided to revisit the pilot script for the series, then known as The Last Stand. On October 8, 2012, NBC placed a pilot order, with the new name After Hours. The pilot was directed by Pierre Morel and written by Gabe Sachs and Jeff Judah.

On April 18, 2013, NBC ordered four additional scripts under a third and final title, The Night Shift. On May 10, 2013, NBC officially ordered The Night Shift to series.

=== Casting ===
Casting announcements began in October 2012, with Eoin Macken first cast in the role of TC Callahan, a doctor who has recently returned from the army who constantly disagrees with his superiors and does things his own way. Freddy Rodriguez was the next actor cast in the series, in the role of Michael Ragosa, the hospital's administrator who originally wanted to be a doctor. Ken Leung and Jeananne Goossen were then added to the cast, with Leung cast in the role of Topher, an emergency room doctor who previously helped soldiers that were injured in battle. Goossen signed onto the role of Krista, a beautiful resident at the hospital. In early November, Robert Bailey Jr. joined the series as Paul Cummings, a young, but squeamish resident at the hospital. Jill Flint later signed onto the role of Jordan Alexander, the newly promoted Chief of the Night Shift, who once dated T.C. Daniella Alonso was the last actor cast in the series. Alonso played the role of Dr. Landry de la Cruz, the lone psychiatrist working the night shift.

=== Filming ===
Production on season one of The Night Shift began in Albuquerque, New Mexico, in late August 2013, and ended filming in mid-November. Production on season two commenced on November 10, 2014. Production on season three took place from February to June 2016. Filming for season four began in April 2017.

== Reception ==
=== Critical reception ===
Brian Lowry of Variety said "The Night Shift is still an awfully weak blip creatively speaking". David Hinckley of the New York Daily News gave the show three out of five stars.

Review aggregation website Rotten Tomatoes gives Season 1 an approval rating of 17% based on 23 reviews, with an average rating of 4.18/10. The site's consensus states: "Calculated and cliche-ridden, The Night Shift is DOA."

On Metacritic, the series has a weighted average score of 45 out of 100 based on 16 reviews, indicating "mixed or average reviews".

=== Ratings ===
Viewership and ratings per season of The Night Shift
Season	Timeslot (ET)	Episodes	First aired		Last aired		TV season	Viewership rank	Avg. viewers (millions)
Season	Timeslot (ET)	Episodes	Date	Viewers (millions)	Date	Viewers (millions)	TV season	Viewership rank	Avg. viewers (millions)
1	Tuesday 10:00 pm	8	May 27, 2014	7.67	July 15, 2014	6.05	2013–14	N/A	8.50
2	Monday 10:00 pm	14	February 23, 2015	5.52	May 18, 2015	5.20	2014–15	86	6.67
3	Wednesday 10:00 pm	13	June 1, 2016	4.81	August 31, 2016	5.43	2015–16	N/A	4.99
4	Thursday 10:00 pm	10	June 22, 2017	3.59	August 31, 2017	3.08	2016–17	N/A	3.97

== Home media ==
DVD name	Ep #	Release date
The Night Shift: Season One	8	October 11, 2016
The Night Shift: Season Two	14	April 11, 2017
The Night Shift: Season Three	10	August 15, 2018
