= Magic Camp (film) =

2020 film by Mark Waters

- Official release poster
- Directed by: Mark Waters
- Screenplay by: Micah Fitzerman-Blue; Noah Harpster; Matt Spicer; Max Winkler; Dan Gregor; Doug Mand
- Story by: Gabe Sachs; Jeff Judah; Matt Spicer; Max Winkler
- Produced by: Suzanne Todd
- Starring: Adam DeVine; Jeffrey Tambor; Gillian Jacobs
- Cinematography: Theo van de Sande
- Edited by: Bruce Green; Robert Malina
- Music by: Rolfe Kent
- Production companies: Walt Disney Pictures; Team Todd
- Distributed by: Walt Disney Studios Motion Pictures
- Release date: August 14, 2020
- Running time: 100 minutes
- Country: United States
- Language: English
- Budget: $24 million

Magic Camp is a 2020 American fantasy comedy family film directed by Mark Waters. Micah Fitzerman-Blue, Noah Harpster, Matt Spicer, Max Winkler, Dan Gregor and Doug Mand serve as co-screenwriters, with an original story written by Gabe Sachs, Jeff Judah, Spicer and Winkler. It stars Adam DeVine, Jeffrey Tambor and Gillian Jacobs. The film was released on Disney+ on August 14, 2020. The film was removed from Disney+ on May 26, 2023.

== Plot ==
Theo Moses is an aspiring young magician coping with the death of his father. His mother reveals his acceptance video from the Institute of Magic, a summer camp run by the eccentric Roy Preston; assuming his father applied for him, Theo agrees to attend. Andy Duckerman is a down-on-his-luck former magician with a grudge against the famous Kristina Darkwood, who has a successful solo act on the Las Vegas strip. Preston persuades Andy, his former student, to return to camp as a counselor alongside Darkwood.

At camp, the students are split into four different cabins to face each other in the end-of-year Top Hat competition, where one student will win the coveted Golden Wand. Andy is assigned to lead the Hearts cabin, including Theo; allergy-prone Nathan Jenkins; rabbit-obsessed Ruth Brusselbach; Judd Kessler, the less talented son of a famous magician; and antisocial Vera Costa. Darkwood leads the Diamonds, including previous Golden Wand winner and bully Vic d'Antonio, and Janelle Santos, who takes a liking to Theo.

The inexperienced Hearts struggle to learn magic, and a frustrated Andy almost quits, but discovers that Theo has a gift for card tricks. Determined to beat Darkwood, Andy helps the Hearts realize their hidden talents: Judd embraces costume design, Ruth has an affinity for birds over bunnies, Nathan can perform impressive mental calculations, and Vera begins to make friends. Helping Theo overcome his stage fright, Andy reveals that he and Darkwood met as campers, and became a couple as well as magic partners; she accepted a television deal behind his back, and her career took off while he fell into obscurity.

Darkwood convinces Janelle, whose wealthy parents send her to various camps instead of spending time with her, to give magic a chance. Attempting to humiliate Nathan, Vic is outdone by Theo and seemingly burns Theo's cards – a gift from his father, who introduced him to magic. Distraught, Theo bonds with Andy and his fellow Hearts, as well as Janelle. After the Diamonds check out all the camp's props for themselves, Andy takes the Hearts into town to train with whatever they can find, and the young magicians perform their acts in public.

Andy confronts Darkwood, who already reprimanded her team, and she reveals the truth behind their falling out: she tried to negotiate a deal for both of them, which he never gave her a chance to explain. She has booked him a matinee in Vegas for the next day; with Preston's encouragement, Andy accepts, knowing he will miss the Hearts' training but be back in time for the Top Hat competition that night. Preston informs the Hearts that Andy has gone to Vegas, but after his successful matinee, Andy is invited to perform the evening show – at the same time as the competition.

The students' families, including Janelle's parents, arrive for the competition. Without Andy there, a nervous Theo is encouraged by Preston, who shows him the supportive video Theo's mother submitted as his application. Andy – having turned down the Vegas show – watches his team perform, and deduces that Preston arranged everything to restore Andy's love for magic. Theo conquers his fears to give the final performance, a heartfelt card trick thanking his family for their support. The Hearts win the Top Hat, and Janelle is awarded the Golden Wand.

Andy is hired to be the camp's year-round talent director, and reconciles with Darkwood, who agrees to teach with him if he performs at her Vegas show on occasion. Vic apologizes to Theo and returns his unharmed cards; Judd's father proudly accepts that he is a talented designer, rather than a magician; Ruth finally holds a rabbit while forming a close friendship with Vera; and Janelle and Theo share a kiss. The film ends with a new Institute of Magic video headed by Andy.

== Cast ==
- Adam DeVine as Andy Duckerman, a camp counselor who was a former magic prodigy and bears a grudge against Kristina
- Jeffrey Tambor as Roy Preston, the mentor and owner of the magic camp
- Gillian Jacobs as Kristina Darkwood, a camp counselor who's a successful magician and was Andy's former partner
- Nathaniel McIntyre as Theo Moses, a 12-year-old boy who attends the magic camp as he copes with his father's death
- Cole Sand as Nathan Jenkins, a boy ridden with allergies who befriends Theo
- Isabella Crovetti as Ruth Brusselbach, a girl obsessed with bunnies who becomes a bird expert
- Josie Totah (Note: Credited as J. J. Totah; Magic Camp was filmed before Totah came out as transgender.) as Judd Kessler, the son of a famed magician who prefers fashion over tricks
- Izabella Alvarez as Vera Costa, an antisocial, sarcastic girl
- Hayden Crawford as Vic d'Antonio, a bully who's the previous year's Golden Wand winner
- Bianca Grava as Janelle Santos, a rich girl who becomes Theo's crush
- Aldis Hodge as Devin Moses, Theo's father
- Rochelle Aytes as Zoe Moses, Theo's mother
- Krystal Joy Brown as Lena Lambert, one of the camp counselors
- Desmond Chiam as Xerxes, one of the camp counselors
- Lonnie Chavis as Cameron Moses, Theo's younger brother
- Michael Hitchcock as Kornelius Kessler, Judd's magician father
- Michael Anastasia as Hamilton, Janelle's chauffeur
- Willie Garson as Casino Manager

Magician Justin Willman has a cameo as one of Andy's taxi fares. Willman, along with other actual magicians, helped the cast with performing the various tricks seen in the movie.

== Production ==
On November 2, 2016, it was announced that Walt Disney Pictures had cast Adam DeVine and Jeffrey Tambor to star in the family comedy film Magic Camp, which would be directed by Mark Waters from a script by Dan Gregor and Doug Mand, and a previous draft by Steve Martin. DeVine would play Andy Duckerman, a counselor to the magic camp of his youth hoping to reignite his career, while Tambor would play Roy Preston, the mentor and owner of the magic camp. Suzanne Todd would produce the film, while Gabe Sachs and Jeff Judah would serve as executive producers. It had been previously reported that the most recent draft of the script had been written by Micah Fitzerman-Blue and Noah Harpster, the project having been developed by Matt Spicer and Max Winkler. Sachs, Judah, Spicer and Winkler would ultimately be credited with the story. On November 9, 2016, Gillian Jacobs was cast as Kristina Darkwood, Andy's former partner. On November 21, 2016, Cole Sand was cast as Nathan Jenkins, the best friend of Theo Moses (who would be played by Nathaniel McIntyre), a 12-year-old boy who attends the Magic Camp as he copes with his father's death. On January 4, 2017, Josie Totah was cast as Judd Kessler.

Principal photography on the film began on January 10, 2017 in and around Los Angeles.

The film's trailer was released on August 10, 2020, four days before the film premiered.

== Release ==
The film was originally set to be released in theaters on April 6, 2018, by Walt Disney Studios Motion Pictures. Later, the theatrical release was cancelled and it was exclusively released on Disney+ on August 14, 2020.

== Reception ==
On Rotten Tomatoes, the film holds an approval rating of 38%, based on 13 reviews with an average rating of 5.1/10.

Jennifer Green of Common Sense Media rated the movie three out of five stars, stating, "Magic Camp is a tween-friendly comedy starring Adam Devine that combines two childhood passions -- magic and camp -- in a story about encouraging kids and adults to work as a team and discover and value their unique talents." Kate Erbland of IndieWire gave the movie a C rating, found the concept of a summer camp dedicated to prestidigitation original, and stated that the movie has some humorous moments, while claiming that the film provides easily perceived moral lessons coupled with a predictable plot.
