= What About Brian =

- Season 1 cast
- Genre: Comedy drama
- Created by: Dana Stevens
- Starring: Barry Watson; Sarah Lancaster; Rosanna Arquette; Matthew Davis; Rick Gomez; Amanda Detmer; Raoul Bova; Krista Allen; Jason George; Amanda Foreman; Rachelle Lefevre; Tiffani Thiessen; Jessica Szohr; Stacy Keibler; Amy Jo Johnson; Jon Hamm
- Country of origin: United States
- Original language: English
- No. of seasons: 2
- No. of episodes: 25

Production
- Executive producers: Bryan Burk; Jonathan Pontell; Dana Stevens; J. J. Abrams; Josh Reims; Jeff Judah; Gabe Sachs; Thom Sherman
- Producers: Carol Dunn Trussell; Robert Duncan McNeill; David Graziano; Liz Tigelaar; Robert M. Williams Jr.
- Running time: 60 minutes
- Production companies: Sachs/Judah Productions (season 1); Bad Robot; Touchstone Television

Original release
- Network: ABC
- Release: April 16, 2006 – March 29, 2007

What About Brian? is an American comedy-drama television series created by Dana Stevens and co-produced by J. J. Abrams' company Bad Robot. The series premiered on April 16, 2006, on ABC, as a mid-season replacement and concluded on March 26, 2007. On May 16, 2006, ABC renewed the series for its second and final season, notably making it the only new series to be picked up by the network from the 2005–2006 television season, despite it being the final new series introduced by ABC during the season. The series returned October 9, 2006, with a full 22-episode season confirmed by November 10, 2006. The second season order was subsequently scaled back to 19 episodes by the network.

What About Brian? ended its run after two seasons on March 26, 2007.

== Plot ==
32-year-old Brian Davis is living alone in Venice Beach, California. However, he is the only bachelor left in his group of friends. His best friend, lawyer Adam Hillman, recently got engaged to his long-time girlfriend Marjorie, a girl Brian is secretly in love with and whom Adam was planning to break up with prior to their engagement. Another friend, Dave Greco, who is co-founder with Brian of Zap Monkey, a company that designs and produces video games, cannot wait to welcome Brian into the marriage club, as Dave has been married to Deena for thirteen years and has three daughters. His older sister, record executive Nicole, has recently married Italian model Angelo Varzi and is pregnant with a girl she names Bella. Brian's journey to find romance leads him down a road where the picture-perfect relationships of his friends are tested and revealed for what they truly are.

== Cast and characters ==
- Barry Watson as Brian Davis
- Matthew Davis as Adam Hillman
- Rick Gomez as Dave Greco
- Amanda Detmer as Deena Greco
- Rosanna Arquette as Nicole Varzi
- Sarah Lancaster as Marjorie Seaver (Episodes 1–6, 17–19) (note: portrayed by Polly Shannon in the unaired pilot)
- Raoul Bova as Angelo Varzi (Episodes 1–6, 10)
- Rachelle Lefevre as Heather "Summer" Hillman (Episodes 5, 7–19)
- Jason George as Jimmy (Season 2)
- Amanda Foreman as Ivy (Season 2)
- Krista Allen as Bridget Keller (Episodes 12–22)
- Stacy Keibler as Stephanie (Episodes 20–25)
- Jessica Szohr as Laura (Episodes 20–25)
- Tiffani Thiessen as Natasha Drew (Episodes 21–25)
- Amy Jo Johnson as Karen "The Car Girl" (Episodes 1, 10–11)
- Jon Hamm as Richard Povich (Episodes 2–5, 23–24)
- Malena Maestas as Baby Girl (Episode 24)
- Anaisa Maestas as Baby Girl (Episode 24)
- William Devane as Michael Davis (Episodes 10–16)

== Episodes ==
Season	Episodes	Originally released	
Season	Episodes	First released	Last released
1	6	April 16, 2006	May 8, 2006^{[1]}
2	19	October 9, 2006	March 26, 2007

Notes

^{1} "Final airdate" is for Episode #1.5 – Episode #1.6 was never aired and is only available on the season 1 DVD.

=== Season 1 (2006) ===
No. overall	No. in season	Title	Directed by	Written by	Original release date	Viewers (millions)
1	1	"Pilot"	Anthony Russo & Joe Russo and Dan Lerner	Dana Stevens	April 16, 2006	12.47
What about Brian? Of his close-knit group of friends, everyone else has paired off, while Brian has emerged as the last bachelor standing. At 32, regardless of his run of bad luck in matters of the heart, Brian Davis still holds out hope that one day he'll open the door and be blinded by love. However, questions about his fate have been popping up more frequently in his head. The most pressing question is, and it's one that only he can answer, could all of his problems stem from the fact that he is harboring a crush on the picture-perfect Marjorie, his best friend's girl?
2	2	"Two In Twenty-Four"	Dan Lerner	Dana Stevens	April 17, 2006	7.13
As Brian tries to put his secret feelings for Marjorie aside, Adam and Dave Greco encourage him to live the ultimate single man's dream by hooking up with two different women in 24 hours. Meanwhile, Marjorie experiences mixed feelings when she sees Brian moving on. Deena Greco thinks about the possibilities of an open marriage, when she meets a cute divorced dad at her daughter's school, and in their efforts to have a baby, Nic encourages a reluctant Angelo to go to a clinic.
3	3	"Moving Day"	Ron Lagomarsino	Sheila R. Lawrence	April 24, 2006	5.38
The newly engaged Adam and Marjorie move in together, but pressures at work prevent Adam from helping with the move. He calls on Brian to lend Marjorie a hand, forcing the two into a very uncomfortable situation. Meanwhile, Dave and Brian anxiously await a call from a potential client who could solve their money woes. Nic considers taking fertility shots, and Deena is torn between staying home with her sick child or accepting a date from the cute divorced dad she met at her daughter's school.
4	4	"The Importance Of Being Brian"	Gabe Sachs	Stuart Zicherman & Raven Metzner	May 1, 2006	6.03
It's Saturday and everyone wants something from Brian, but no one can find him. Brian has decided that he would rather spend the day with his new love, Lisa B. Meanwhile, Nicole, hopped up on her fertility hormone treatments, needs her brother to help her and Angelo with a car problem. Deena and Dave expect Brian to play "Barney" at their daughter's birthday party. Adam, stuck planning the wedding, wants him for some guy time, and Marjorie keeps leaving messages on Brian's phone to talk about their relationship.
5	5	"Sex Lies and Videotape"	Dan Lerner	Kate Angelo	May 8, 2006	6.40
Brian's new girlfriend brings out Marjorie's jealous streak. Dave embarks on a stakeout to follow Deena, and Nicole hides from Angelo that she's on fertility treatments. At the end of the episode, Brian and Marjorie get into a big fight, which Adam witnesses through the window.
6	6	"What Happens In Vegas?"	N/A	David Schulner	Unaired	N/A
Angelo and Nicole meet with a pregnant woman about adopting her baby. In retaliation for Deena's tryst at the hotel, Dave sleeps with Suzanne and remembers what it feels like to be with someone who wants him. Word of Marjorie's indecision about agreeing to a prenuptial agreement with Adam spreads throughout the hospital. Lisa B. hosts a dinner party at Brian's and invites Adam and Marjorie. While having some wine before dinner, Adam confronts Marjorie and Brian about their feelings for each other. Lisa B. finds out that she is part of a "two in twenty-four" and leaves. Marjorie realizes that Adam doesn't really want to get married, and that she doesn't want to marry the man she has come to know.

=== Season 2 (2006–07) ===
The second season of the series premiered on October 9, 2006. Along with Wife Swap and The Bachelor, it was part of ABC's first primetime Monday evening lineup for the fall not to include Monday Night Football, since that show's shift to ESPN. Contrasting with what had historically been a night which drew high male viewership, What About Brian? was seen by some industry analysts as the closer to a new lineup appealing particularly to female viewers. Every episode in the second season begins with "What About...?".

No. overall	No. in season	Title	Directed by	Written by	Original release date	Prod. code	Viewers (millions)
7	1	"What About Second Chances...?"	Jonathan Pontell	Dana Stevens	October 9, 2006	201	7
The series moved forward six months, with Adam and Marjorie's wedding fast approaching. Brian returns from his "road trip" in which he got in an accident with a semi. Nicole is pregnant, and it is later revealed in the episode that she is having a girl. Dave and Deena try to work on their marriage, by consulting a therapist. The friendship between Adam and Brian is strained since Marjorie told Adam about what happened. As a result, Dave is now the best man and Brian is no longer liked by Adam. Brian tries to make it up to Adam during the episode but ultimately fails. However, Marjorie is having second doubts about her marriage, and goes over to Brian the night before the wedding and they kiss.
8	2	"What About The Wedding..."	Allison Liddi-Brown	Kate Angelo	October 16, 2006	202	7.3
It's the wedding today for Adam and Marjorie. We flash back to when Adam and Brian both meet Marjorie at a New Year's party; Dave is still having doubts about his marriage while Brian tells both Adam and Marjorie that they shouldn't get married, and consequently Adam gets into a fight with Brian. The time for the wedding has come, and Brian tells Marjorie not to go forward with it. Marjorie rejects the idea at first, but subsequently runs out on her own wedding at the end of the episode.
9	3	"What About Denial...?"	Perry Lang	Mark B. Perry	October 23, 2006	203	6
Two weeks after Adam has been left at the altar, he still blames Brian for what has happened. When their friends finally try to bring them together, they end up coming to blows. Nicole helps Deena try to save her disintegrating marriage, while Deena reciprocates by letting a nervous Nicole practice mothering by babysitting her one-year-old. Meanwhile, when Brian and Dave go on a local cable program to promote their videogame, Dave is on edge when Deena and Suzanne -- the woman he's been having an affair with -- both show up on the set and meet for the first time.
10	4	"What About the Fish...?"	Michael Apted	Liz Tigelaar	October 30, 2006	204	6.1
To encourage each other to get over Marjorie and back out in the dating game, Brian and Adam bet to see who can get a girl first. Meanwhile, Brian adjusts to having Dave as his new roommate after Deena kicks him out of the house for having an affair; Nicole prepares for her baby shower, as well as a surprise guest; and the future of Zap Monkey is in jeopardy, which causes a financially strapped Brian to try anything and everything to save the company.
11	5	"What About Angelo's Ashes...?"	Jonathan Pontell	Josh Reims	November 13, 2006	205	5.2
At Angelo's funeral, the friends give loving tributes and recall fond memories of Angelo while they marvel at Nicole's strength. However, they soon realize she may not be handling this as well as she seems to be. Meanwhile, Brian's dad, Michael, confronts Brian about his plans now that Zap Monkey has folded, Dave and Deena discuss getting a divorce, and Adam continues to connect with Summer, the stripper he met at his bachelor party.
12	6	"What About What Was Supposed to Be...?"	Jerry London	Michael Foley	November 20, 2006	206	5.4
Needing money, Brian starts a job at his father's high-end real estate firm. Sparks fly when he meets the company's top agent, the beautiful Bridget (Krista Allen). Meanwhile, Dave starts a new job as well, and he and Deena work out a unique child custody arrangement; Adam's relationship with Summer may be problematic for his professional future; and Nicole finds a way to work through her grief after losing her husband.
13	7	"What About First Steps...?"	Allison Anders	Stephen Hootstein	December 4, 2006	207	5.4
Nicole tries to help Deena out with her cupcake business, but things turn interesting when Deena meets a rich client, who seems to be smitten by her. Dave tries to help Brian, who is trying to find ways to make Bridget interested in him. Dave tells him to go to a speed dating thing. He says to bring Bridget along so she could see the other jerks and then Brian would look better to her. Adam and Heather start to rethink getting married.
14	8	"What About Secrets...?"	Dennie Gordon	Dana Stevens	December 11, 2006	208	4.7
Bridget has a secret that starts to tear apart the connection that Brian and his dad are working on building. Now that Adam and Heather are married, he doesn't feel comfortable with her being a stripper anymore. He talks to Jimmy about it, who, it turns out, has run a criminal background check on her. Dave and Nicole go to the filming of Angelo's last movie. Nicole is thrown off by a mysterious woman who is also there. She seems to be connected to Angelo somehow. Deena finally gets up the courage to go out on a date with T.K.
15	9	"What About True Confessions...?"	Bethany Rooney	Ross Canter	December 18, 2006	209	4.6
Nicole is anxious to finally have the baby and tries every old wives' tale out there to induce labor. Deena and Dave each go out on separate dates. Deena goes out with her rich client, T.K., while Dave goes out with a woman much younger than he is. Brian and Adam cause a lot of problems, along with damage at Ivy's bar, and they are forced to do community service at a homeless shelter. Brian is very uncomfortable with the fact that Bridget and his father had an affair, and does whatever it takes to avoid her.
16	10	"What About The Tangled Web...?"	Harry Winer	Kate Angelo	January 8, 2007	210	4.7
When Brian's dad decides to take the real estate company away on a retreat, Brian and Bridget gradually get closer. Meanwhile, after Adam and Dave make an awkward visit to the strip club where Heather works, Adam wants his new wife to give up her job; and Nicole promises both Dave and Deena that they can accompany her when she goes into labor, but neither is willing to give up the spot to the other. Nicole gives birth to a girl, Bella.
17	11	"What About The Exes...?"	David Paymer	Nancy Jack	January 15, 2007	211	4.7
Brian and Bridget have the conversation about their ex-relationships, but Brian doesn't include Marjorie. Adam and Heather have to deal with an overzealous ex-client of Heather's, and Nicole sets up a photo shoot to promote Deena's fledgling cupcake business. Meanwhile, Dave and Deena make a startling discovery about their one-year-old daughter, which brings to town a visitor from the friends' not-so-distant past.
18	12	"What About Marjorie...?"	Matt Shakman	Liz Tigelaar	January 22, 2007	212	5.3
Marjorie's return causes all kinds of problems and conflicts amongst the new couples. Heather knew she was the second choice for Adam, but didn't feel like it until Marjorie came back. Brian, who normally dumps his flings around the sixth week, is celebrating his sixth week anniversary with Bridget. Nicole is on the hunt for a nanny, but she seems to find something wrong with each one of them.
19	13	"What About the Lake House...?"	Dan Lerner	Dana Stevens	January 29, 2007	213	5.7
Brian's father must sell his lake house, so Brian invites the gang there one last time for a weekend getaway. He hopes to make Bridget feel more like a part of the group of friends. Meanwhile, Dave and Deena grapple with making the decision about their daughter's ear surgery, and Adam tries to figure out his feelings for Heather and Marjorie.
20	14	"What About Finding Your Place...?"	Robert Duncan McNeill	Josh Reims	February 12, 2007	214	5.6
Now that both Brian and Bridget have lost their real estate jobs and she has lost her condo, she moves into Brian's apartment, where he has taken a job as the building manager. Brian helps two extremely attractive women, Laura and Stephanie, move into the apartment downstairs. Meanwhile, Deena and Dave discuss whether he should move back home to help with their daughter's ear surgery recovery, Nicole fantasizes about Jamie, her manny, and now that he's separated, Adam takes a vow of celibacy.
21	15	"What About Temptations...?"	Sarah Pia Anderson	Michael Foley	February 19, 2007	215	5.7
Dave is surprised to see that his new boss, Natasha, turns out to be his former intern. She has re-invented herself from being overweight and nondescript into a sexy, manipulative and shrewd businesswoman. While Bridget is away on a business trip, Brian's downstairs neighbors, Laura and Stephanie, convince him to let them use his apartment for a party that turns raucous. Meanwhile, the still-celibate Adam continues to pursue his law partnership, Dave moves into the guest room back home and Nicole has an erotic dream about her manny.
22	16	"What About Strange Bedfellows...?"	Tom Verica	Stephen Hootstein	March 5, 2007	216	4.9
While Brian wonders if his relationship with Bridget is the right thing, Laura senses that all is not right between the couple. Natasha's favoritism toward Brian becomes apparent when she asks him and not Dave to coordinate a major presentation for some Japanese clients. Meanwhile, now that Adam has made partner, he breaks his celibacy rule and goes out on a date with Stephanie. After Nicole and her manny, Jamie, share a kiss, Nicole no longer thinks he is gay.
23	17	"What About All That Glitters...?"	Stan Salfas	Ross Canter	March 12, 2007	217	4.7
Deenas mother, Frankie, comes for a visit and, like everyone else, is unaware that Dave and Deena are back together. Now that Brian has broken up with Bridget, he gets separate invitations from his two attractive downstairs neighbors. Meanwhile, against Natasha's wishes, Brian assigns a big presentation to Dave; Adam and Nicole deal with the aftermath of their unexpected tryst; Dave gets into a fist fight with Deena's ex-lover; and the friends get a surprise when they visit Ivy and Jimmy's home for the first time.
24	18	"What About Secret Lovers...?"	Bethany Rooney	Beth Schwartz	March 19, 2007	218	6.4
Everyone seems to have secret lovers and must make decisions accordingly. Dave and Deena receive their divorce papers and they struggle with the decision on whether or not to sign them. Now that a picture of Brian and Stephanie kissing has made the tabloids, Stephanie asks her roommate Laura to act as Brian's date to a Hollywood party with her. Natasha wants a casual, sexual relationship with Adam and will stop at nothing less. Deena is having troubles with her cupcake business, until Nicole comes up with a plan to bring in more customers.
25	19	"What About Calling All Friends...?"	Robert Duncan McNeill	Dana Stevens & Kate Angelo	March 26, 2007	219	6.8
In the series finale, Dave and Deena's plans for a secret getaway to renew their wedding vows turns chaotic. Meanwhile, Brian and Adam's babysitting duties for Dave and Deena's daughters are interrupted when Natasha shows up with a work emergency. Brian calls on Stephanie to look after the girls, but when a crisis occurs, he realizes that Laura is the one he should have asked for help. After Nicole and Deena's Icing on the Cupcake store starts getting great press, an overwhelmed Nicole finds herself alone and without any help to tend to the many new customers.

== Unaired pilot ==
An unaired pilot with a completely different structure from the first episode was created, with Polly Shannon portraying Marjorie instead of Sarah Lancaster.

== International broadcasts ==
Country	TV Network(s)	Date of Premiere	Weekly Schedule
Australia	Seven Network; 7Two	February 18, 2007; November 4, 2009	Sundays, 9.30pm Wednesdays, 10:30pm (repeats)
Austria	ORF eins	December 22, 2007	
Bulgaria	bTV	2008	Monday–Thursday, 9.00pm (first run); Monday–Friday, 3.30pm (second run)
Canada	CTV	June 3, 2008	Monday–Friday, 4.15pm
Finland	Nelonen	2008	Sundays, 4.30pm
France	TF1	May 2007	Saturdays, 4.00pm
Germany	Sixx	August 20, 2011	
Greece	Fox Life	January 7, 2011	Fridays, 9.50pm
Indonesia	Global TV	2008	Tuesdays, 11.25pm
Israel	Xtra HOT; HOT3	December 24, 2006; 2007	Sundays, 10.00pm Sunday–Thursday, 7.10pm
Italy	Fox Life; RaiDue	September 8, 2006; June 2, 2008	Fridays, 9.50pm unknown
Japan	WOWOW	April 2008	Sundays
Latin America	Sony Entertainment Television	November 2006	Mondays, 9.00pm
Netherlands	NET 5	2007	Tuesdays. 9.30pm
New Zealand	TV2; Vibe	2007; 2009	Fridays, 8.30pm Saturday, 7.30pm
Pakistan	Pakistan Television	September 2008	Sundays, 9.00pm
Philippines	Studio 23	September 2007	
Poland	Fox Life	2007	
Portugal	RTP2	February 2007	Thursdays, 10.40pm
Slovenia	Kanal A	February 2007	Thursdays, 10.40pm
Spain	La Sexta; Nitro	July 18, 2007; January 2009	Mondays, 0:00; Saturdays, 14:40
United Kingdom	E4; Channel 4	May 2007	Tuesdays, 9.00pm Fridays after midnight
United States	ABC	April 16, 2006	Mondays, 10.00pm

== Home media ==
Walt Disney Studios Home Entertainment has released the entire series on DVD in Region 1.

DVD name	Ep #	Release date	Additional information
The Complete Series	24	September 25, 2007	What About Season 3 featurette; Cast interviews & Bloopers

== Music ==
- Howie Day's "Collide" is the song used in the announcement commercials.
- The theme song that appears at the beginning of each episode is "Calling All Friends" by Low Stars.
- The 1970 song "Hey Hey What Can I Do?" by Led Zeppelin inspired the theme song and also has lyrics that parallel the show's plot. The lyrics of the song tell of a man's love for a woman that he will never have all to himself; a woman who 'wants to ball all day', 'stays drunk all the time', and who 'won't be true.' The first verse is a declaration of his love and his desire to tell her that she is the only one for him. The second verse describes her infidelity and his jealousy and frustration. In the third verse he comes to the conclusion that he must leave her 'where the guitars play', a sentiment reinforced by the vamp in which the lead singer, Robert Plant, is backed by the rest of the band repeating the two lines; 'Hey hey what can I do' and 'Oh Lord what can I say.'
- Colin Hay's music has been used in several episodes of What About Brian?:
- Hay's song "Waiting for My Real Life to Begin?" ended the episode "Two in 24" and was also used in the episode "Sex, Lies and Videotape."
- "Beautiful World" ended the episode "Moving Day."
- "Don't Wait Up" ended the episode "The Importance of Being Brian" and was also in the episode "Sex, Lies and Videotape."
- Keith Varon has provided songs for the show.
