= Natasha Melnick =

American actress

- Occupation: Actress
- Years active: 1998–2012

Natasha Melnick is an American television and film actress, best known for her role as Cindy Sanders on the short-lived 1999 NBC comedy drama Freaks and Geeks.

== Career ==
Melnick graduated from San Fernando High School in the San Fernando Valley, and enrolled in college at age fifteen in the fall of 1999. Her first film appearance was in Disney's The Parent Trap. She also appeared in Go and Orange County, in addition to recurring roles on Boston Public and Do Over.

Melnick appeared as a recurring character in Freaks and Geeks as cheerleader Cindy Sanders, whom central character Sam Weir (John Francis Daley) had a longtime crush on. In 2000, Melnick and the rest of the Freaks and Geeks cast were nominated for the YoungStar Award for Best Ensemble Cast, though the award ultimately went to Malcolm in the Middle. In 2001, Melnick appeared in the show Undeclared, which was developed by Judd Apatow and treated as a spiritual successor to Freaks and Geeks.

== Filmography ==
Film
Year	Title	Role	Notes
1998	The Parent Trap	Girl at Poker Game	
1999	Go	Anorexic Girl	
2002	Orange County	Katie	
2003	Gentleman B.	Young Maria	
2004	The Hillside Strangler	Karyn	
2006	The Iron Man	Chloe	
2007	Everything or Nothing	Lynny Miller	
2009	God Thinks You're a Loser	Candy	
2010	1,001 Ways to Enjoy the Missionary Position	Amber	

Television
Year	Title	Role	Notes
1998	7th Heaven	Sheila	Episode: "...And a Nice Chianti"
1999-2000	Freaks and Geeks	Cindy Sanders	10 episodes
2000	Miracle on the Mountain: The Kincaid Family Story	Susan Kincaid	TV movie
2000	Malcolm in the Middle	Amber	Episode: "High School Play"
2001	King of the Hill	(voice)	Episode: "Kidney Boy and Hamster Girl: A Love Story"
2001	Judging Amy	Alice-Jane Kovac	Episode: "Imbroglio"
2001	Undeclared	Jenni	Episode: "Rush and Pledge"; Episode: "Hell Week"
2002	Do Over	Isabelle Meyers	15 episodes
2004	Boston Public	Rainy Murphy	4 episodes
2005	Life As We Know It	Sabrina	Episode: "A Little Problem"; Episode: "Breaking Away"
2005	American Dad!	Hilary Duff (voice)	Episode: "Pilot"
2005–2012	Family Guy	Ruth (voice)	4 episodes
