= Jerry Messing =

American actor

- Occupations: Actor, internet personality
- Years active: 1997–2021

Jerry Messing is an American actor. He is known for a recurring role in the TV program Freaks and Geeks (1999–2000).

== Career ==
Messing played Pugsley Addams in the 1998 film Addams Family Reunion, and had a reoccurring role on the short-lived cult NBC dramedy Freaks and Geeks as Gordon Crisp, an optimistic geek with trimethylaminuria. He also appeared in five episodes of Even Stevens and two episodes of Mr. Show with Bob and David. Messing has not appeared in an acting role since 2003.

In 2011, Messing appeared in a music video for artist Viennie V, playing a contestant on a dating show. As of 2019, the video has over 770,000 views.

=== "Fedora Guy" meme ===
On October 31, 2013, a picture of Messing appeared on Reddit. The photo features Messing wearing a trilby and grinning at the camera. After being widely disseminated online, Messing was labeled "Fedora Guy" and the picture became synonymous with "neckbeard" and "nice guy" stereotypes, as well as a joke at the expense of zealous atheists. Messing has stated in subsequent interviews that the picture was an outtake for a headshot photoshoot he took when attempting to restart his acting career, after briefly attending Florida International University to study psychology. As Messing noted, "I'm certainly not thrilled with the communities the photo has come to represent, but it isn't something I can really do anything about—so I don't let it bother me."

=== Fedora Productions ===
In January 2020, Messing started the YouTube channel "Fedora Productions". YouTube.

=== COVID-19 Diagnosis ===
In August 2021, it was revealed that Messing had been admitted to a Florida hospital and put on a ventilator after contracting COVID-19. He had previously received his first dose of the Pfizer–BioNTech COVID-19 vaccine and was awaiting his second dose when he became sick. In September 2021, after spending two weeks in a coma, Messing was removed from the ventilator and taken out of the ICU, able to breathe on his own. He had lost the ability to walk but, as of September 2021, was going through rehabilitation.

== Filmography ==
=== Film ===
Year	Title	Role	Notes
1998	Addams Family Reunion	Pugsley Addams	
2000	Finding Kelly	Justin Harold	

=== Television ===
Year	Title	Role	Notes
1997	George & Leo	Boy #1	Episode: "The Halloween Show"
1998	Mr. Show with Bob and David	William Van Landingham III/ Willups Brighton's son	Episode: "Show Me Your Weenis!"; Episode: "Sad Songs Are Nature's Onions"
1999–2000	Freaks and Geeks	Gordon Crisp	11 episodes
2000–2003	Malcolm in the Middle	Big Boy #2	Episode: "The Bully"; Episode: "Clip Show #2" (archive footage)
2000–2002	Even Stevens	Artie Ryan	Episode: "Foodzilla"; Episode: "Battle of the Bands"; Episode: "Head Games"; Episode: "Band on the Roof"; Episode: "Snow Job"
2002–2003	The Brothers García	Tiny	Recurring Role
