= Dan Lerner =

American television director

- Occupation(s): Television director, television producer
- Years active: 1969–2021

Dan Lerner is an American television director and producer, mostly specializing in dramatic television.

Some of his directing credits include NCIS, L.A. Law, Once and Again, Profiler, Carnivàle, Thirtysomething, Chicago Fire, Grey's Anatomy, In Plain Sight and Bull.

Prior to his work in television, Lerner worked as camera operator on the films Sophie's Choice, Witness, Against All Odds and Heartburn.
