= Freaks and Geeks =

American teen comedy-drama television series (1999–2000)

- Genre: Period teen drama; Comedy drama
- Created by: Paul Feig
- Showrunner: Paul Feig
- Starring: Linda Cardellini; John Francis Daley; James Franco; Samm Levine; Seth Rogen; Jason Segel; Martin Starr; Becky Ann Baker; Joe Flaherty; Busy Philipps
- Opening theme: "Bad Reputation" by Joan Jett
- Composer: Michael Andrews
- Country of origin: United States
- Original language: English
- No. of seasons: 1
- No. of episodes: 18

Production
- Executive producer: Judd Apatow
- Cinematography: Russ T. Alsobrook; Bill Pope (pilot)
- Editors: Tara Timpone; Sean K. Lambert; Brent White
- Camera setup: Single-camera
- Running time: 44 minutes
- Production companies: Apatow Productions; DreamWorks Television

Original release
- Network: NBC
- Release: September 25, 1999 – October 17, 2000 (Note: Its final NBC air date was July 8, 2000, however, the three unaired episodes eventually aired on Fox Family Channel in September and October 2000.)

Freaks and Geeks is an American teen comedy drama television series created by Paul Feig and executive-produced by Judd Apatow that aired on NBC from September 25, 1999, to July 8, 2000. Three episodes were left unaired by NBC, and the episodes were first broadcast in September and October 2000 on Fox Family Channel. The show is set in a suburban high school near Detroit during 1980–81. The theme of Freaks and Geeks reflects "the sad, hilarious unfairness of teen life". With little success when it first aired, because of an erratic episode schedule and conflicts between the creators and NBC, the series was canceled after airing 15 out of the 18 episodes. The series—which launched most of its young actors' careers—stars Linda Cardellini, John Francis Daley, James Franco, Samm Levine, Seth Rogen, Jason Segel, Martin Starr, Busy Philipps, Becky Ann Baker, and Joe Flaherty.

The series became a cult classic, and Apatow continued the show's legacy by incorporating the actors in future productions. It appeared in numerous lists of the greatest television shows of all time, including lists by Time, Entertainment Weekly, TV Guide, Rolling Stone and Variety.

== Plot ==
Teenager Lindsay Weir and her younger brother, Sam, attend William McKinley High School during the 1980–81 school year. The show is set in the town of Chippewa, Michigan, a fictional suburb of Detroit (named after Chippewa Valley High School, which series creator Paul Feig attended).

Lindsay joins a group of friends who are referred to as the "freaks" — Daniel Desario, Ken Miller, Nick Andopolis, and Kim Kelly — while Sam's friends, Neal Schweiber and Bill Haverchuck, constitute the "geeks." The Weir parents, Harold and Jean, are featured in every episode, and Millie Kentner, Lindsay's nerdy and highly religious former best friend, is a recurring character, as well as Cindy Sanders, the popular cheerleader on whom Sam has a crush.

Lindsay finds herself attempting to transform her life as an academically proficient student, star "mathlete" into a rebellious teenager who hangs out with troubled slackers. Her relationships with her new friends and the friction they cause with her parents and her self-image form one central strand of the show. The other follows Sam and his group of geeky friends as they navigate a different part of the social universe and try to fit in.

== Cast and characters ==
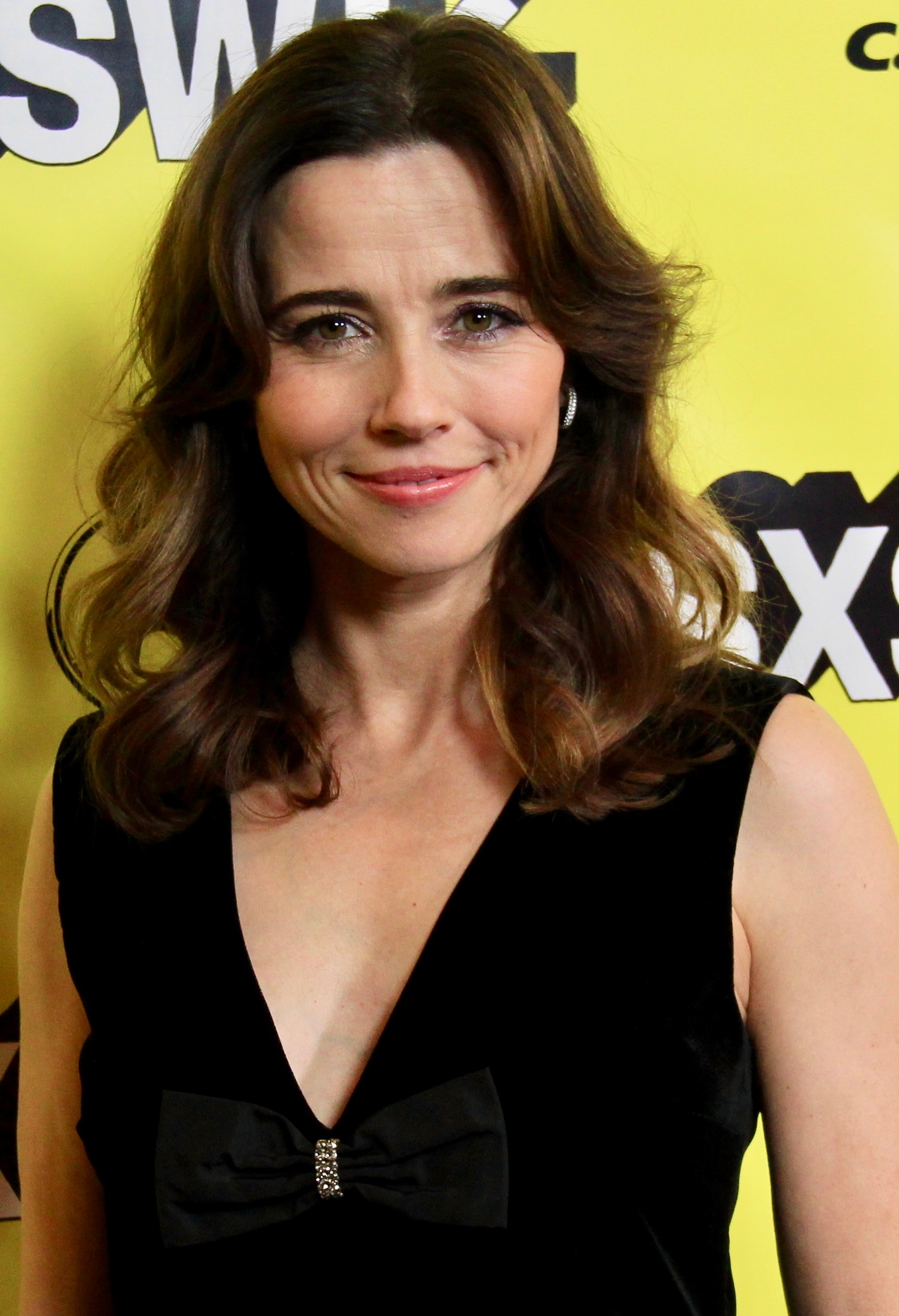
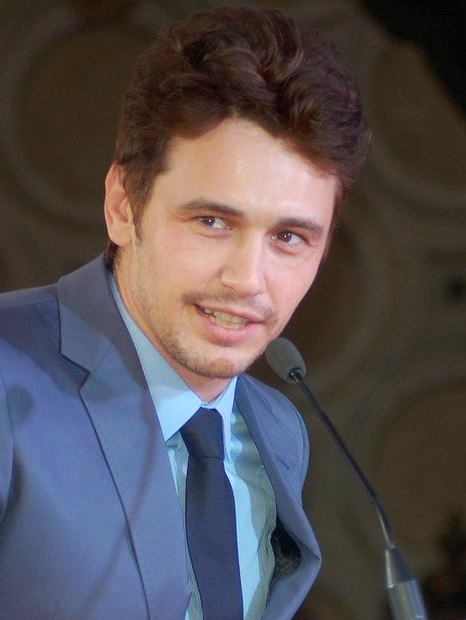
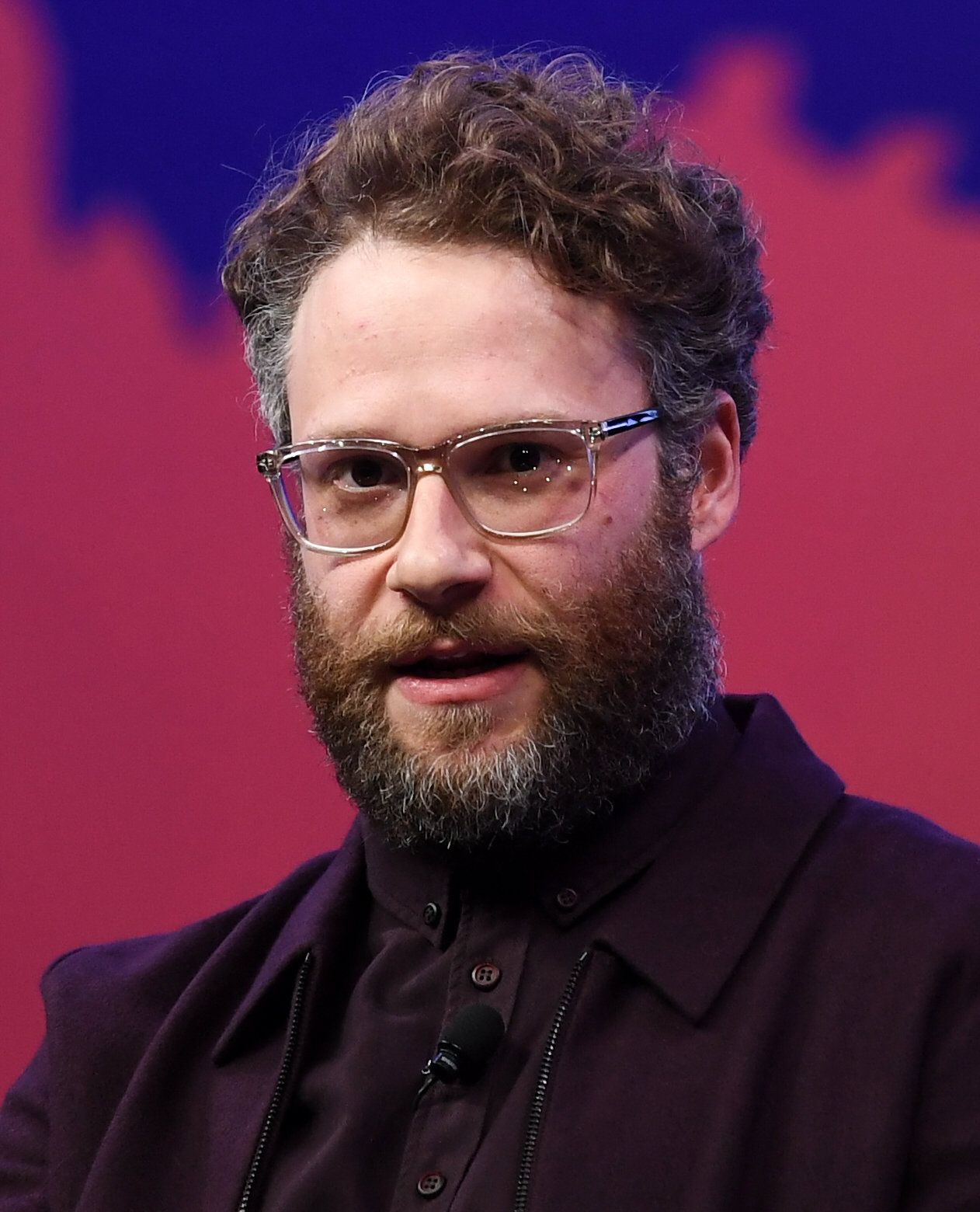
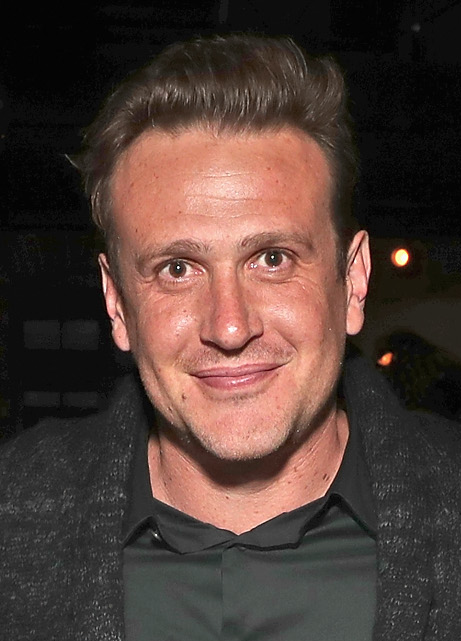
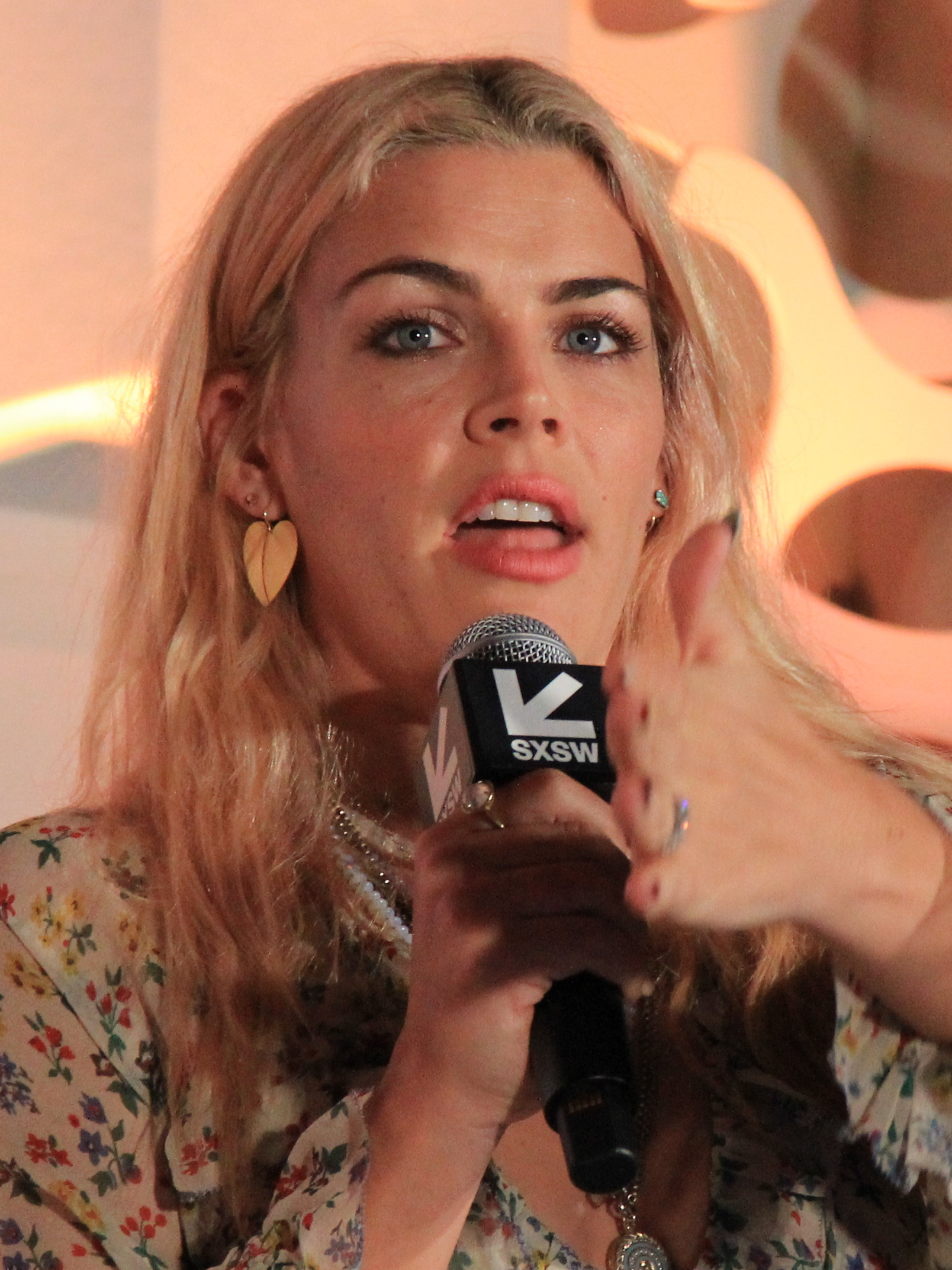
Linda Cardellini, James Franco, Seth Rogen, Jason Segel and Busy Philipps portrayed the show's "Freaks".
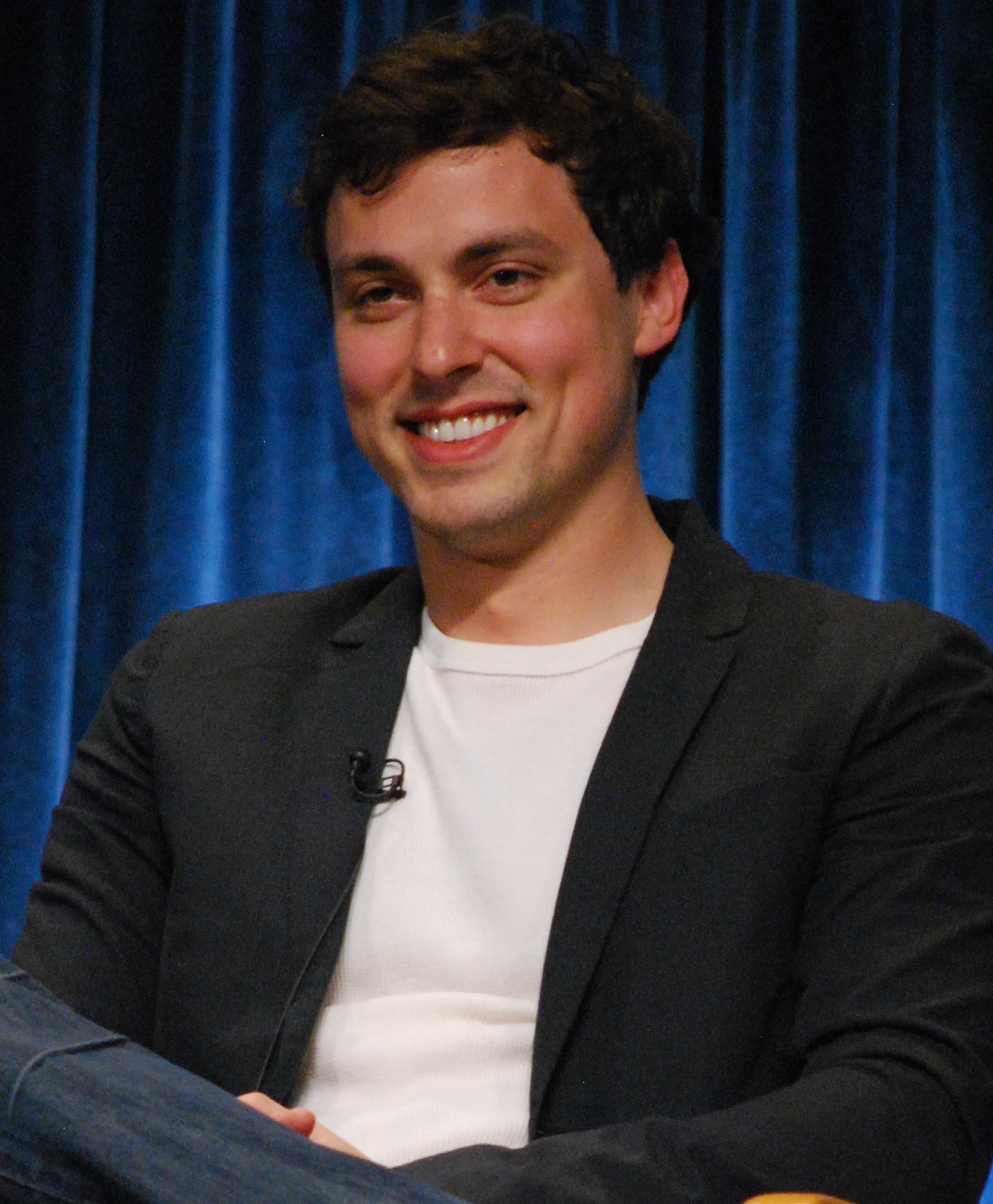
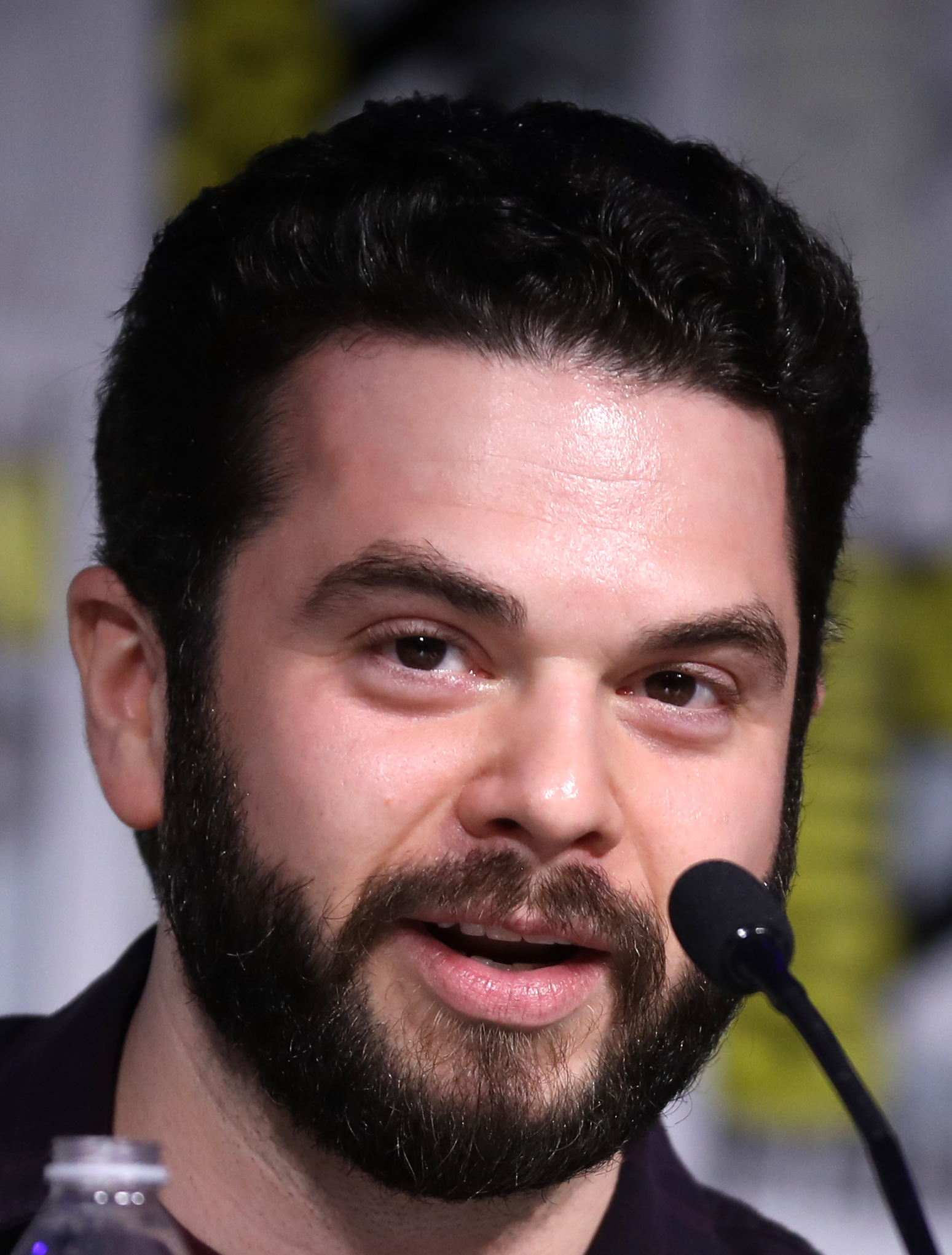
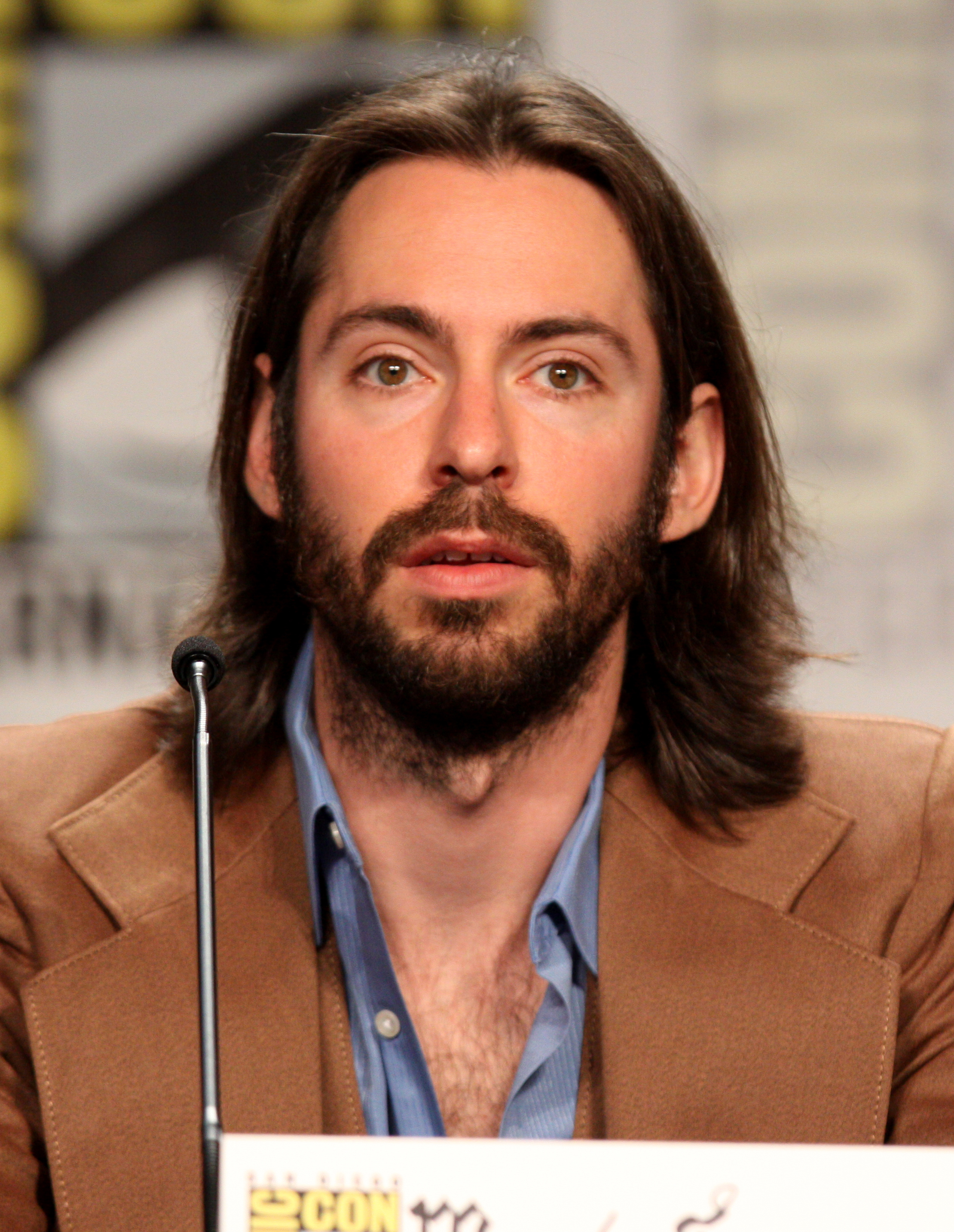
John Francis Daley, Samm Levine and Martin Starr portrayed the show's "Geeks".

=== Main cast ===
- Linda Cardellini as Lindsay Weir
- John Francis Daley as Sam Weir
- James Franco as Daniel Desario
- Samm Levine as Neal Schweiber
- Seth Rogen as Ken Miller
- Jason Segel as Nick Andopolis
- Martin Starr as Bill Haverchuck
- Becky Ann Baker as Jean Weir
- Joe Flaherty as Harold Weir
- Busy Philipps (Note: Credited after opening credits as "also starring") as Kim Kelly

=== Recurring cast ===
- Dave "Gruber" Allen as Jeff Rosso
- Steve Bannos as Frank Kowchevski
- Tom Wilson as Coach Ben Fredricks
- Natasha Melnick as Cindy Sanders
- Sarah Hagan as Millie Kentner
- Stephen Lea Sheppard as Harris Trinsky
- Jerry Messing as Gordon Crisp
- Chauncey Leopardi as Alan White
- JoAnna Garcia as Vicki Appleby
- Kayla Ewell as Maureen Sampson
- Riley Smith as Todd Schellinger
- Jessica Campbell as Amy Andrews
- Trace Beaulieu as Hector Lacovara
- Ann Dowd as Cookie Kelly
- Kevin Tighe as Mr. Andopolis
- Sam McMurray as Vic Schweiber
- Amy Aquino as Lydia Schweiber
- Claudia Christian as Gloria Haverchuck
- Ben Foster as Eli
- Lizzy Caplan as Sara
- Shaun Weiss as Sean
- Joel Hodgson as Joel, a disco clothing store manager and occasional DJ

=== Guest stars and cameo appearances ===
Guest stars included:

- Samaire Armstrong as "Deadhead" Laurie
- Alexandra Breckenridge as mathlete Shelly Weaver
- Jack Conley as Kim Kelly's stepfather
- Kevin Corrigan as Millie's delinquent cousin Toby
- Allen Covert as a liquor store clerk
- Matt Czuchry as a student from rival Lincoln High
- Alexander Gould as Ronnie, the boy Lindsay babysits while high
- Steve Higgins as Mr. Fleck, the Geeks' A/V teacher
- Rashida Jones as Kim Kelly's friend Karen Scarfolli
- Bianca Kajlich as a nose piercing punk girl
- David Koechner as a waiter, in an uncredited role
- David Krumholtz as Neal's brother Barry
- Shia LaBeouf as Herbert, the school mascot
- Leslie Mann as school teacher Miss Foote
- Ben Stiller as a Secret Service agent
- Jason Schwartzman as Howie Gelfand, a disco clothing store assistant dealing in fake IDs

The show's producers were resistant to stunt casting. For example, they resisted the network's suggestion that they have Britney Spears appear as a waitress in one episode; they thought such appearances would detract from the show's realism.

Several of the screenwriters appeared on the show. Mike White played Kim Kelly's oft-discussed injured brother, and first appeared in episode 4, "Kim Kelly is My Friend". Paul Feig, Gabe Sachs and series composer Michael Andrews appear uncredited as members of the fictional band Dimension in "I'm With the Band".

Numerous actors who starred on Freaks and Geeks would appear on Judd Apatow's later TV series Undeclared, including Rogen, Segel, Levine, Starr, Phillips and Melnick, among several others.

== Episodes ==
The script for the pilot episode of Freaks and Geeks was written by Paul Feig as a spec script. Feig gave the script to producer Judd Apatow, who sold it to DreamWorks, where Apatow was under an overall deal. DreamWorks sold it to NBC, who greenlit a pilot. Before the script was shot, Feig wrote a second episode at the behest of Apatow. He showed this second script to Apatow and pilot director Jake Kasdan, and they suggested that he combine the two episodes to form a stronger pilot. Notable additions include the introduction of Kim Kelly and Lindsay's recollection of her grandmother's death. Feig wrote a final draft after a read-through with the cast, this time incorporating a first meeting between Lindsay and the freaks (in previous drafts, Lindsay was already part of the group).

The show ran for 18 episodes, three of which — "Kim Kelly Is My Friend", "Dead Dogs and Gym Teachers" and "Noshing and Moshing" — were unaired by NBC and not seen until Fox Family ran the show in 2000. The final three episodes premiered at the Museum of Television and Radio prior to being broadcast on television. The list below is ordered by the chronology of the storyline.

No.	Title	Directed by	Written by	Original release date	Prod. code	U.S. viewers (millions)
1	"Pilot"	Jake Kasdan	Paul Feig	September 25, 1999	100	9.17
A group of high school students in 1980 faces various social struggles. High school junior Lindsay Weir rebels by hanging out with a crowd of "freaks", including charismatic burnout Daniel Desario, the mild-mannered Nick, and the sarcastic and wise-cracking Ken. Lindsay's affiliation with this gang of freaks and her quitting the mathletes worries her parents, Harold and Jean, as well as her former best friend Millie. Lindsay's brother, freshman Sam Weir, struggles to find the courage not only to confront his and his friends' bully Alan, who labels Sam's friends as "geeks", but also to ask cheerleader Cindy Sanders to the homecoming dance. Lindsay attempts to stop the bullying of a special education student, Eli, which goes terribly wrong and ends in him being injured. Lindsay reveals to Sam that her struggles started after the recent passing of their grandmother, causing her to question the accepted norms of religion and social structure.
2	"Beers and Weirs"	Jake Kasdan	J. Elvis Weinstein & Judd Apatow	October 2, 1999	101	5.58
When the Weir parents go out of town for the weekend, Lindsay's new friends suggest she throw a party. Lindsay hesitantly agrees in the hopes of impressing Daniel, who has broken up with his girlfriend Kim. She asks Sam not to tell their parents; he agrees, though an anti-alcohol assembly held at school causes him to hesitate over the thought of serving beer at the party. When Sam discusses the matter with his close friends Bill and Neal, Bill suggests that they switch the real beer with non-alcoholic beer. Despite the fake beer, the rowdy teenagers begin to think they are drunk. While Neal and Sam patrol the party, Bill gets drunk off of the real beer while watching television in Sam's room. Lindsay finds herself having a terrible time when she sees that Daniel is back with Kim. Nick comforts Lindsay, but she brushes him off when he tries to make a move on her.
3	"Tricks and Treats"	Bryan Gordon	Paul Feig	October 30, 1999	102	5.02
Halloween approaches and Sam persuades Bill and Neal to go trick-or-treating with him. The neighborhood reacts awkwardly to Sam and his friends, believing they are too old to be trick-or-treating, and things only become worse when Alan picks a fight with the geeks. Lindsay agrees to stay home and hand out homemade cookies with her mom on Halloween night, although the cookies are rejected by multiple parents due to fears of contamination. When Lindsay gets an invite to go cruise around town with Nick, Daniel, Ken and Kim, she ditches her mom to hang out with them, much to Jean's dismay. Lindsay enjoys her first taste of vandalism with the freak gang, but she accidentally takes things too far when she pelts Sam with eggs as he walks home.
4	"Kim Kelly Is My Friend"	Lesli Linka Glatter	Mike White	September 5, 2000 (Note: Initial airing occurred on Fox Family)	103	N/A
Kim's friend, Karen, bullies Sam by writing "Pygmy Geek" on his locker; Sam is blamed for the incident and is assigned to write a 500-word essay about vandalism in school. Sam does not take kindly to Karen's label and finds himself in an argument with Neal over who is geekier. Kim, who has been openly hostile towards Lindsay, suddenly befriends Lindsay and invites her to dinner. When Lindsay questions her intentions, Kim explains that she needs to introduce a nice friend to her parents, so they will stop hassling her to sell her AMC Gremlin, which she inherited from her now-deceased aunt. After Lindsay finds out what an abusive home Kim is living in, the two flee the scene in Kim's car. When Lindsay suggests that Kim lie low at the Weir house, the Weirs find themselves in for a long night as Daniel arrives to attempt to make amends.
5	"Tests and Breasts"	Ken Kwapis	Bob Nickman	November 6, 1999	104	6.14
Daniel's Algebra teacher, Mr. Kowchevski, threatens to force him to repeat the class if he does not pass an upcoming test. Lindsay offers to help Daniel study, but Daniel would much rather cheat. After Mr. Kowchevski dismisses Daniel as a loser who will never amount to anything, a furious Lindsay agrees to help Daniel cheat by giving him the answers of a stolen test. Sam begins sex education class with Coach Fredericks but is mystified by a dirty joke told by two athletes. Daniel tries to help Sam understand by giving him a pornographic film, but this only deepens his confusion. Eventually, Coach Fredericks, off the record, helps Sam understand the situation better, including why the joke is funny. Lindsay and Daniel are accused of cheating and called before a disciplinary committee consisting of Mr. Rosso and Mr. Kowchevski, during which Daniel makes an impassioned plea about being pigeonholed as a dumb kid. Realizing that it is the same speech he used to motivate her, Lindsay bursts into laughter.
6	"I'm with the Band"	Judd Apatow	Gabe Sachs & Jeff Judah	November 13, 1999	105	5.08
Nick realizes that if he does not make a career out of being a drummer, his father is going to make him join the Army. Lindsay attempts to remedy this first by pressuring the band – consisting of Nick on drums, Daniel on guitar, Ken on vocals and Sean on bass – to practice more, which results in the band breaking up when Nick demands they take it more seriously. Lindsay then gets Nick an audition for the band Dimension. However, the audition goes miserably, and Nick is depressed over the fact that his drumming is not going to save him from joining the Army. Lindsay kisses him to cheer him up. Meanwhile, when the physical education department at McKinley mandates that all students must shower after class, Sam avoids the shower at all costs, afraid to be naked in front of his peers. This leads to Alan locking him out of the gym with no clothes on, resulting in Sam streaking involuntarily in front of the entire school.
7	"Carded and Discarded"	Judd Apatow	Judd Apatow & Paul Feig	January 10, 2000	110	7.59
Sam, Neal and Bill befriend Maureen, a very pretty and friendly new transfer student at McKinley. When the popular crowd shows interest in her, the geeks take Maureen out on a night of all-you-can-eat dining in an attempt to keep from losing her. Harold and Jean struggle to spend time with their kids; Harold tries to force the family to spend quality time together, but Jean ultimately convinces him to let their kids be more independent. Lindsay and the freaks try to buy fake IDs from Millie's brother to see the band Feedback perform at a local bar. However, after they go through the trouble of getting their IDs and going into the bar, the group is stunned to find out who the hot local band's lead singer is: Mr. Rosso.
8	"Girlfriends and Boyfriends"	Lesli Linka Glatter	Patty Lin & Paul Feig	January 17, 2000	106	7.55
Nick begins making more aggressive advances toward Lindsay, most of which end up making her feel more disturbed than lovestruck. Lindsay also discovers that everyone, even her parents, assume she is going to have sex with Nick, although Lindsay is unsure of what she herself wants to do. Nick invites Lindsay over to his house and professes his love for her with a performance of Styx's "Lady", leaving Lindsay more bewildered. Tension is created between Sam and Bill when Bill is paired with Cindy as a science partner. Sam is able to spend more time with Cindy by joining her in the yearbook club, and the two bond. However, Cindy confesses to Sam her crush on Todd Schellinger, the school's star basketball player, and thanks Sam for his brotherly friendship. Although disappointed, Sam continues to stand by Cindy when Todd finally asks her out.
9	"We've Got Spirit"	Danny Leiner	Mike White	January 24, 2000	107	7.23
Sam, hoping to become closer to Cindy, becomes the McKinley basketball team's new mascot after the former mascot breaks his arm. Instead of winning Cindy's heart, however, Sam increasingly becomes frustrated with her apparent desire to be nothing more than friends, as well as her and Todd's relationship. After witnessing them kiss, he eventually becomes so fed up that he allows Neal be the mascot during a basketball game. However, Neal is much more interested in getting laughs than following orders from Vicki, the bossy head cheerleader, and ends up ruining the act. Lindsay feels smothered by Nick and tries to figure out the best way to break up with him. She confides in her mother, who inadvertently breaks the news to Nick. The freaks, meanwhile, have a sudden interest in sports and school spirit after they get beaten up by a gang of McKinley's rivals at Lincoln.
10	"The Diary"	Ken Olin	Story by : Judd Apatow & Rebecca Kirshner; Teleplay by : Rebecca Kirshner	January 31, 2000	108	8.22
Lindsay's parents fear that her new friends are having a negative effect on her, and they prevent her from hanging out with Kim. They read Lindsay's diary at the persuasion of Kim's mother, but are stunned when reading Lindsay's thoughts on the dynamic of her parents' relationship. Bill is tired of being confined to deep right field during PE baseball games and always being the last one picked. He is constantly embarrassed by Coach Fredericks in front of his classmates and is convinced he could be a great athlete if he were simply given a chance. Instead of confronting Coach Fredricks with this dilemma directly, Bill makes two prank phone calls to him, one of which consists entirely of insults. While Fredericks is reasonably angered by the prank calls, he listens to Bill's concerns and gives him a chance to shine by appointing him captain the next softball game, during which time the geeks play with reasonable facility.
11	"Looks and Books"	Ken Kwapis	Paul Feig	February 7, 2000	109	6.98
After Lindsay crashes the Weir family car while trying to help the freaks' band pick up gear for a gig, her parents indefinitely ground her and forbid her from seeing the freaks again. Shaken by the experience, Lindsay happily abides and tries to re-associate herself with her old friends, including Millie. In the process, she rejoins the mathletes team and reveals her competitive side, inadvertently impressing the freaks with her mental prowess. Meanwhile, after a new hairstyle does not impress Cindy, Sam decides to dress more attractively, buying a powder-blue disco jumpsuit. The attire only attracts negative attention toward him, and Mr. Rosso talks to him about the inner nature of confidence. After the freaks discuss their plans after high school, Daniel grows self-conscious upon realizing he does not have any future aspirations. Lindsay ultimately leaves the mathletes again, realizing that she has grown beyond them.
12	"The Garage Door"	Bryan Gordon	Gabe Sachs & Jeff Judah & Patty Lin	March 13, 2000	111	6.57
Sam and Bill both admire Neal's father until Sam, at the mall with his mother, sees Mr. Schweiber hugging a strange woman. Mr. Schweiber tries to downplay the entire thing, claiming he is trying to buy Neal an Atari; Sam, fearing that Mr. Schweiber may be cheating on his wife, tells Bill and then Neal. Soon after, Neal finds an unfamiliar garage door remote control in his father's car. The geeks start hunting around the neighborhood on their bicycles, clicking the remote to find what house it belongs to. Meanwhile, Ken reveals his crush on "Tuba Girl", a girl named Amy who plays the sousaphone in McKinley's marching band. The freaks, along with Amy, go to the local laser dome to see a laser show, where Ken and Amy kiss. Sam and Bill return home due to the late hour; Neal, alone, finds a garage door opening in response to the remote control with his father's car parked within.
13	"Chokin' and Tokin'"	Miguel Arteta	Judd Apatow	March 20, 2000	112	6.04
At Nick's suggestion, Lindsay smokes marijuana for the first time. Moments later, Harold reminds her that she had promised to babysit for their neighbors that night. Afraid to babysit by herself, Lindsay pleads Millie to babysit with her. Millie not only takes care of the child they are babysitting, but also takes care of Lindsay while she anxiously deals with the effects of smoking pot. After Bill reveals he is deathly allergic to peanuts, Alan believes Bill is lying and secretly puts peanuts into Bill's sandwich. Bill is rushed to the hospital after eating one bite of the sandwich. Alan visits a seemingly-unconscious Bill at the hospital and profusely apologizes; it is revealed that Alan shared similar interests with the geeks, but harbored resentment towards them for rejecting him in his efforts to befriend them when they were younger. Later revealing that he was conscious, a grateful Bill invites Alan to join them at a sci-fi convention. Alan nearly accepts, but cannot bring himself to join along.
14	"Dead Dogs and Gym Teachers"	Judd Apatow	Judd Apatow & Bob Nickman	October 10, 2000	114	N/A
Lindsay and Kim accidentally run over Millie's dog one night. Lindsay wants to come clean to Millie, but Kim advises against confessing and instead strikes up a friendship with Millie, bonding over the loss of her own dog years ago. Grieving, Millie begins to rebel and accepts Kim's invitation to join the freaks in watching The Who live in concert. However, Kim confesses to running over Millie's dog when Millie is about to drink he first beer, after which Millie returns to her former personality. In an attempt to win back Lindsay, Nick teaches himself to play guitar and writes a love ballad, but Ken prevents him at the last minute from playing it in front of Lindsay. Bill is devastated to hear that his mother has been dating Coach Fredericks after they met during Bill's allergic reaction. He is initially unwilling to accept the relationship, so Coach Fredericks attempts to win him over by taking the geeks go-karting. This backfires when Coach Fredericks accidentally causes Bill to crash, but he later gives a heartfelt speech proclaiming his genuine love and care for Bill's mother. The two of them later bond over television.
15	"Noshing and Moshing"	Jake Kasdan	J. Elvis Weinstein	October 17, 2000	115	N/A
While trying to escape his problems with his parents and Kim, Daniel becomes attracted to Jenna Zank, a dropout from McKinley who is into the punk scene. To try to impress her, Daniel changes his appearance and meets her at a punk show. After seeing Jenna kiss somebody else, Daniel leaves and reconciles with Kim. Neal loses interest in schoolwork and instead focuses on his new ventriloquism act, and is resistant when Sam and Bill try to get to him to admit that this is a way to cope with his father's infidelity. He confesses the matter to his older brother Barry, who has come home from college to attend the Schweibers' annual party for their father's dentistry clients; Barry counsels him to keep it a secret. At the party, Lindsay flees with Barry and the two kiss, which Neal witnesses. Further enraged by this, Neal is forced to perform his act and makes unkind jokes about his father. Neal, confronted by his mother afterwards, tearfully tells her about the affair. Mrs. Schweiber admits that she knows, and that she and her husband are "working on it".
16	"Smooching and Mooching"	Jake Kasdan	Steve Bannos	July 8, 2000	116	4.07
Nick's father gets rid of Nick's prized drum kit due to his unsatisfactory report card. Angered, Nick leaves his father's house and finagles an invitation to stay with the Weirs indefinitely. Harold encourages not only Nick's love of drumming, but that he apply himself more aggressively, offering him a part-time job and paying for his first drum lesson. Lindsay, though pleased to see Nick flourishing, is upset to see her parents bonding with him more easily than they do with her; Harold explains that Lindsay does not need anywhere near the help Nick does. After breaking up with Todd, Cindy confides to Bill that she has a crush on Sam, communicating through him that she would like Sam to invite her to a party. At the party, the geeks join in playing spin the bottle; Neal only succeeds at landing on Bill, whereas Bill's spins land three times on Vicki. Though initially repulsed by his appearance, the two bond over Bill's confidence, and end up kissing. Sam, who retreats to a spare bedroom with Cindy, meets the same fate.
17	"The Little Things"	Jake Kasdan	Story by : Jon Kasdan & Judd Apatow & Mike White; Teleplay by : Jon Kasdan	July 8, 2000	117	5.26
Ken begins to question his sexuality when Amy reveals to him that she was born an intersex woman; his over-analysis of his relationship with her leads him to the conclusion that he has to break up with her. Sam is having a terrible time dating Cindy, who reveals herself to be demanding, rude, and egotistical, and his time with her limits his interactions with Neal and Bill. Sam and Ken cross paths in the restroom at school, and Sam makes Ken realize that he enjoys his relationship with Amy, which Sam cannot claim about Cindy. Ken finds Amy and reaffirms his care for her, while Sam solemnly breaks up with Cindy. Meanwhile, Vice President George Bush visits the school. Mr. Rosso chooses Lindsay to ask the first question during a meet-and-greet assembly, but Bush's people censor her proposed question and request she ask about his favorite restaurant instead. Lindsay defies orders and asks him a third question: why he is scared to have an honest discourse with high-school students.
18	"Discos and Dragons"	Paul Feig	Paul Feig	July 8, 2000	113	6.75
By chance, Lindsay and the freaks find out that Nick has been dating Sara and she has been teaching him to dance for an upcoming disco competition. Daniel, afraid of failing another test, is caught trying to pull the fire alarm. As punishment, he is forced to join the Audio/Visual club – a group whose membership consists solely of the geeks. They respond to his presence coldly at first, but they later invite him to a game of Dungeons & Dragons, where he excels. Lindsay, as a result of outstanding grades, receives an invitation to an academic summit at the University of Michigan taking place for two weeks during the summer. Confessing the pressure to Mr. Rosso, she is gifted his copy of the Grateful Dead's American Beauty, and she bonds with the music. Lindsay later pretends to leave for Ann Arbor on a bus but disembarks at the next stop where she and Kim meet up with two Deadhead classmates. The episode, and the series, ends as the four leave for a series of Grateful Dead concerts in Colorado.

=== Planned storylines ===
In a 2012 interview with Vanity Fair, Paul Feig detailed what would have happened to the characters if the show had continued: Lindsay, after initial tension with her parents, would become a human rights lawyer, years after following the Grateful Dead. Sam would have joined the drama club. Neal would cope with his parents' divorce by joining a swing choir in school. Bill would join the basketball team, becoming a jock and leading to tension with the geeks. Daniel would end up in jail. Kim would become pregnant on tour while following the Grateful Dead. Nick would be pressured by his strict father to join the Army.

== Media releases ==
=== DVD and Blu-ray ===
On April 6, 2004, a six-DVD Freaks and Geeks box set was released through Shout! Factory and Sony BMG Music Entertainment. A limited "yearbook edition" set, including two additional discs, was also available through the official website for the show. Fans who had signed an online petition to get the show on DVD got priority in purchasing the special set.

On November 25, 2008, the deluxe "Yearbook Edition" box set was re-released through Vivendi Entertainment. The set features all of the episodes, commentaries and special features of the "Complete Series" six-DVD set, plus two extra discs and deluxe packaging. It is packaged as an 80-page color yearbook with essays, pictures and episode synopses.

In July 2015, Shout! Factory announced it had begun preparing for a Blu-ray release of the series. It was subsequently confirmed in December 2015 that Shout! would release the complete series on Blu-ray on March 22, 2016, and the set would contain all special features from the previous releases and the episodes in both their original aspect ratio and widescreen.

As of July 1, 2021, all U.S. DVD and Blu-ray releases have been discontinued and are out of print.

=== Books ===
In October 2004, Newmarket Press released two Freaks and Geeks books: Freaks and Geeks: The Complete Scripts, Volume 1 and Freaks and Geeks: The Complete Scripts, Volume 2. Each book covers nine scripts from the series, compiled by Paul Feig and Judd Apatow. Extra content includes behind-the-scenes memos and notes, photos, additional plot lines and excerpts from the Freaks and Geeks series bibles.

=== Soundtrack ===
Freaks and Geeks' creators made it a priority to feature genuine, period-specific music that would help to create the show's tone. Clearing such names as Billy Joel, Cheap Trick, the Grateful Dead, Rush, Styx, The Moody Blues, The Who and Van Halen required much of the show's budget. Eventually, this became an obstacle in releasing the show on DVD due to the difficulty and expense of clearing all of the music rights for the series. Music cues were changed or removed for Freaks and Geeks when it aired in reruns on Fox Family. However, Freaks and Geeks' creators chose to wait to release the DVD until they could find a company willing to pay for the original music. Shout! Factory, a music and video company specializing in comprehensive reissues and compilations, eventually brought Freaks and Geeks to DVD with all of its music intact.

== Appearances ==
In February 2000, the cast of Freaks and Geeks competed against the cast of The WB teen drama Popular for a special week of the game show Family Feud, hosted by Louie Anderson.

== Reception ==
=== Critical reception ===
At Metacritic, Freaks and Geeks has a score of 88 out of 100, based on 26 reviews, indicating "universal acclaim". On Rotten Tomatoes, the show has a score of 100% with an average rating of 9.7 out of 10, based on 34 reviews. The site's critical consensus reads, "Freaks and Geeks lampoons real-life adolescence while affectionately embracing every growing pain along the way with refreshing honesty."

=== Ratings ===
The show averaged 6.77 million viewers and was #93 in the rankings during the only season it ran.

=== Awards and nominations ===
The series received three Emmy Award nominations: creator Paul Feig was nominated twice for Outstanding Writing for a Comedy Series, for the episodes "Pilot" and "Discos and Dragons", and it won for Outstanding Casting for a Comedy Series (Allison Jones, Coreen Mayrs and Jill Greenberg). It was also nominated for two Television Critics Association Awards, for New Program of the Year and Outstanding Achievement in Drama. For acting, the series won for Best Family TV Series – Comedy and was nominated for Best Performance in a TV Series – Young Ensemble at the Young Artist Awards. For the YoungStar Awards, John Francis Daley and Sarah Hagan were nominated for Best Young Actor/Performance in a Comedy TV Series, and the ensemble was nominated for Best Young Ensemble Cast – Television. The series also received several other nominations in other categories.

The series appeared on Time magazine's 2007 "100 Greatest Shows of All Time" list, and placed third on the magazine's list of greatest television shows of the 2000s. In 2004 and 2007, respectively, Freaks and Geeks ranked No. 25 and No. 21 on TV Guide's Top Cult Shows Ever. In 2008, Entertainment Weekly ranked it the 13th-best series of the past 25 years. The same year, AOL TV named it the Best School Show of All Time. In 2013, TV Guide included it in its list of The 60 Greatest Dramas of All Time, and ranked it No. 1 on their list of 60 shows that were "Cancelled Too Soon". In 2016, it was named the 11th-greatest television series of all time by Rolling Stone.

== Cancellation and legacy ==
One of the cited reasons for its early cancellation was its inability to gain an audience due to its "erratic scheduling" and poor time slots, competing with the high-rated Who Wants to Be a Millionaire. The producers created a website for the series, but NBC would not share its URL because "they didn't want people to know the Internet existed; they were worried about losing viewers to it", as explained by Judd Apatow. Freaks and Geeks was only averaging under 7 million viewers, while other NBC series such as Frasier and Friends were averaging over 14 million viewers each.

NBC and the creative directors of Freaks and Geeks did not have the same vision for the series. After the network picked up the pilot, Garth Ancier replaced Scott Sassa as president of NBC Entertainment. McDermott states that Ancier "doesn't understand public school" and its relevance because he went to a boarding school and then on to Princeton. Creator Paul Feig expressed the irony of the situation, as everyone involved wanted Freaks and Geeks to be a success, but the network did not understand the concept of realistically showcasing life as ordinary teenagers. Jake Kasdan and Judd Apatow had multiple arguments with the network concerning the lack of victories in the script and that the characters needed to be cool. The writers wanted to produce something that would represent the average high school experience, but the network wanted to produce something that would make high school seem cool. Because the network did not think the series would be a success, they let the writers add story lines that they would not have otherwise, such as the story line when Ken discovers his girlfriend was born with ambiguous genitalia. Apatow said in 2014 that "Everything I've done, in a way, is revenge for the people who cancelled Freaks and Geeks."

=== Syndication ===
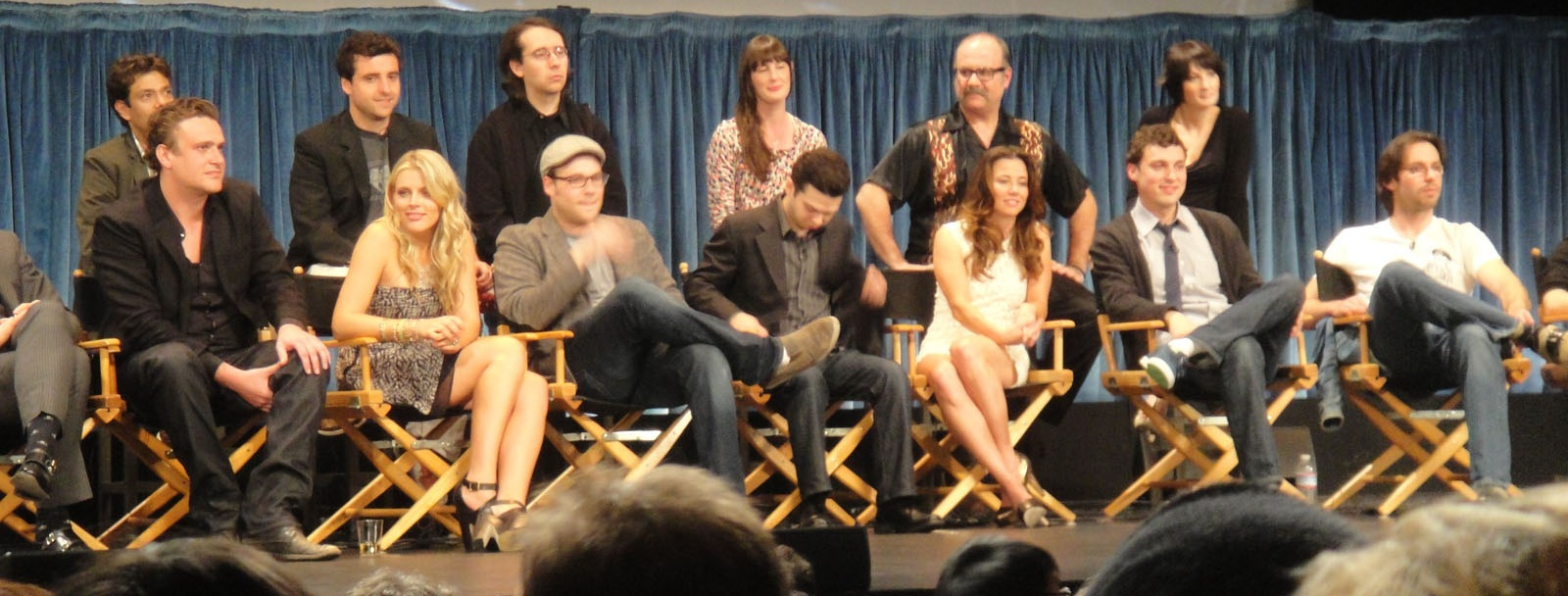
Cast of Freaks and Geeks at PaleyFest 2011

At the beginning of February 2006, the show's underlying ownership shifted from DreamWorks to Viacom (now known as Paramount Skydance). That month, they acquired the rights to Freaks and Geeks and all other television shows and live-action movies DreamWorks produced since their inception, following their $1.6 billion dollar purchase of the company's live-action film and television assets. The show has since been distributed by Paramount Pictures and its related television divisions. In June 2010, it was announced that IFC had acquired the rights to air both Freaks and Geeks and Undeclared, another DreamWorks-produced show which was later acquired by Viacom/Paramount. Freaks and Geeks's 18-episode run on IFC finished with all episodes having aired as of October 29, 2010. Undeclared's IFC run began on November 5, 2010. Both shows also joined the Viacom-owned TeenNick's lineup on June 13, 2011.

=== Cast reunions ===
A reunion of several cast members and producers of both shows took place at the Paley Center for Media's PaleyFest on March 12, 2011.

=== Documentary ===
A documentary directed by Brent Hodge chronicling the history and production of Freaks and Geeks and featuring interviews with the cast and crew, Freaks and Geeks: The Documentary, debuted at the Tribeca Film Festival on April 21, 2018. The documentary had its television debut on July 16, 2018, on A&E.
