= Gabe Sachs =

American television producer

Gabe Sachs is an American television producer, who has been a writer/producer with partner Jeff Judah for a number of primetime television shows and movies including Freaks & Geeks, Just Shoot Me, Undeclared, Life As We Know It, 90210, What About Brian, and The Night Shift. Sachs & Judah were also writers on the hit movies Diary Of A Wimpy Kid and Diary Of A Wimpy Kid: Rodrick Rules.

== Life and career ==
Sachs went to New York, got some friends together, and borrowed better equipment. The result was Street Match, a pilot entirely made on spec, which ABC picked up as a summer series. Soon after, Sachs shot his next show Pranks where he met his current writing/producing partner Jeff Judah. They wrote the pilot Damian Cromwell's Postcards From America under a deal at HBO and soon after Sachs & Judah was formed.

Sachs and Judah have been writing, producing and show-running for the past 18 years. On July 17, 2001, both Sachs and Judah through their Sachs/Judah Productions company had signed a deal with Studios USA.

== Filmography ==
=== Film ===
Title	Year	Credited as		Notes
Title	Year	Writer	Executive producer	Notes
On My Honor	1988	Yes	No	Short film
Diary of a Wimpy Kid	2010	Yes	No	
Diary of a Wimpy Kid: Rodrick Rules	2011	Yes	No	
Magic Camp	2020	Story	Yes	

=== Television ===
The numbers in directing and writing credits refer to the number of episodes.

Title	Year	Credited as				Network	Notes
Title	Year	Creator	Director	Writer	Executive producer	Network	Notes
Street Match	1993	Yes	Yes	No	Yes	ABC	
Pranks	1996	Yes	Yes	No	Yes	ABC	
Damian Cromwell's Postcards from America	1997	No	Yes	No	Yes	HBO	
Costello	1998	No	No	Yes (1)	No	Fox	producer (3 episodes)
Freaks and Geeks	1999–2000	No	No	Yes (2)	No	NBC	supervision producer
Just Shoot Me!	2000–01	No	No	Yes (3)	No	NBC	co-executive producer (season 5)
Undeclared	2001–02	No	No	No	No	Fox	consulting producer (7 episodes)
Homeward Bound	2002	No	No	Yes	Yes	ABC	Unsold pilot, also producer
Platonically Incorrect	2003	No	No	No	Yes	ABC	Unsold pilot
In the Game	2004	No	No	Yes	Yes	ABC	Unsold pilot
Life As We Know It	2004–05	Developer	No	Yes (3)	Yes	ABC	
Testing Bob	2006	No	No	No	Yes	ABC	Unsold pilot
Women of a Certain Age	2006	No	No	No	Yes	ABC	Unsold pilot
What About Brian	2006	No	Yes (1)	No	Yes (5)	ABC	
Making It Legal	2007	Yes	No	Yes	Yes	ABC	Unsold pilot
October Road	2007	No	No	No	Yes (1)	ABC	uncredited
90210	2008–13	Developer	No	Yes (2)	Yes	The CW	Co-executive producer (24 episodes)
Ark	2010	No	No	No	Yes	Hulu	
The Night Shift	2014–17	Yes	Yes (1)	Yes (4)	Yes	NBC	

=== Acting credits ===
Title	Year	Role	Notes
Going Overboard	1989	Funeral mourner	
Freaks and Geeks	1999	Drummer (uncredited)	Episode: "I'm with the Band"
