= Jeff Judah =

American producer & writer

Jeff Judah is an American film and television producer and writer. Along with his writing/producing partner Gabe Sachs, Judah serves as creator and executive producer of the NBC medical drama series The Night Shift. The two also created ABC's teen drama series Life As We Know It. Judah also worked as a producer on the remake of 90210, and wrote the screenplay for the film Diary of a Wimpy Kid, released on March 19, 2010.

On July 17, 2001, both Sachs and Judah through their Sachs/Judah Productions company had signed a deal with Studios USA.

== Filmography ==
=== Film ===
Title	Year	Credited as	Notes
Title	Year	Writer	Notes
Diary of a Wimpy Kid	2010	Yes	
Diary of a Wimpy Kid: Rodrick Rules	2011	Yes	
Magic Camp	2020	Story	

=== Television ===
The numbers in directing and writing credits refer to the number of episodes.

Title	Year	Credited as				Network	Notes
Title	Year	Creator	Director	Writer	Executive producer	Network	Notes
Later with Greg Kinnear	1994–95	No	No	Yes (5)	No	NBC	
Late Show with David Letterman	1994–95	No	No	Yes (48)	No	CBS	
The Tonight Show with Jay Leno	1995–96	No	No	Yes (31)	No	NBC	
Costello	1998	No	No	Yes (1)	No	Fox	producer (3 episodes)
Freaks and Geeks	1999–2000	No	No	Yes (2)	No	NBC	supervision producer
Just Shoot Me!	2000–01	No	No	Yes (3)	No	NBC	co-executive producer (season 5)
Undeclared	2001–02	No	No	No	No	Fox	consulting producer (7 episodes)
Homeward Bound	2002	No	No	Yes	Yes	ABC	Unsold pilot, also producer
Platonically Incorrect	2003	No	No	No	Yes	ABC	Unsold pilot
In the Game	2004	No	No	Yes	Yes	ABC	Unsold pilot
Life As We Know It	2004–05	Developer	No	Yes (3)	Yes	ABC	
Testing Bob	2006	No	No	No	Yes	ABC	Unsold pilot
Women of a Certain Age	2006	No	No	No	Yes	ABC	Unsold pilot
What About Brian	2006	No	Yes (1)	No	Yes (5)	ABC	
Making It Legal	2007	Yes	Yes	No	Yes	ABC	Unsold pilot
90210	2008–13	Developer	No	Yes (2)	Yes	The CW	Co-executive producer (24 episodes)
Ark	2010	No	No	No	Yes	Hulu	
The Night Shift	2014–17	Yes	Yes (2)	Yes (4)	Yes	NBC	

=== Acting credits ===
Title	Year	Role	Notes
Damian Cromwell's Postcards from America	1997	Drunk Man in Bar	
Freaks and Geeks	1999	Sound Mixer (uncredited)	Episode: "I'm with the Band"
Bad Teacher	2011	Janitor	
