= Saturn Award for Best Supporting Actor on Television =

Annual US television award

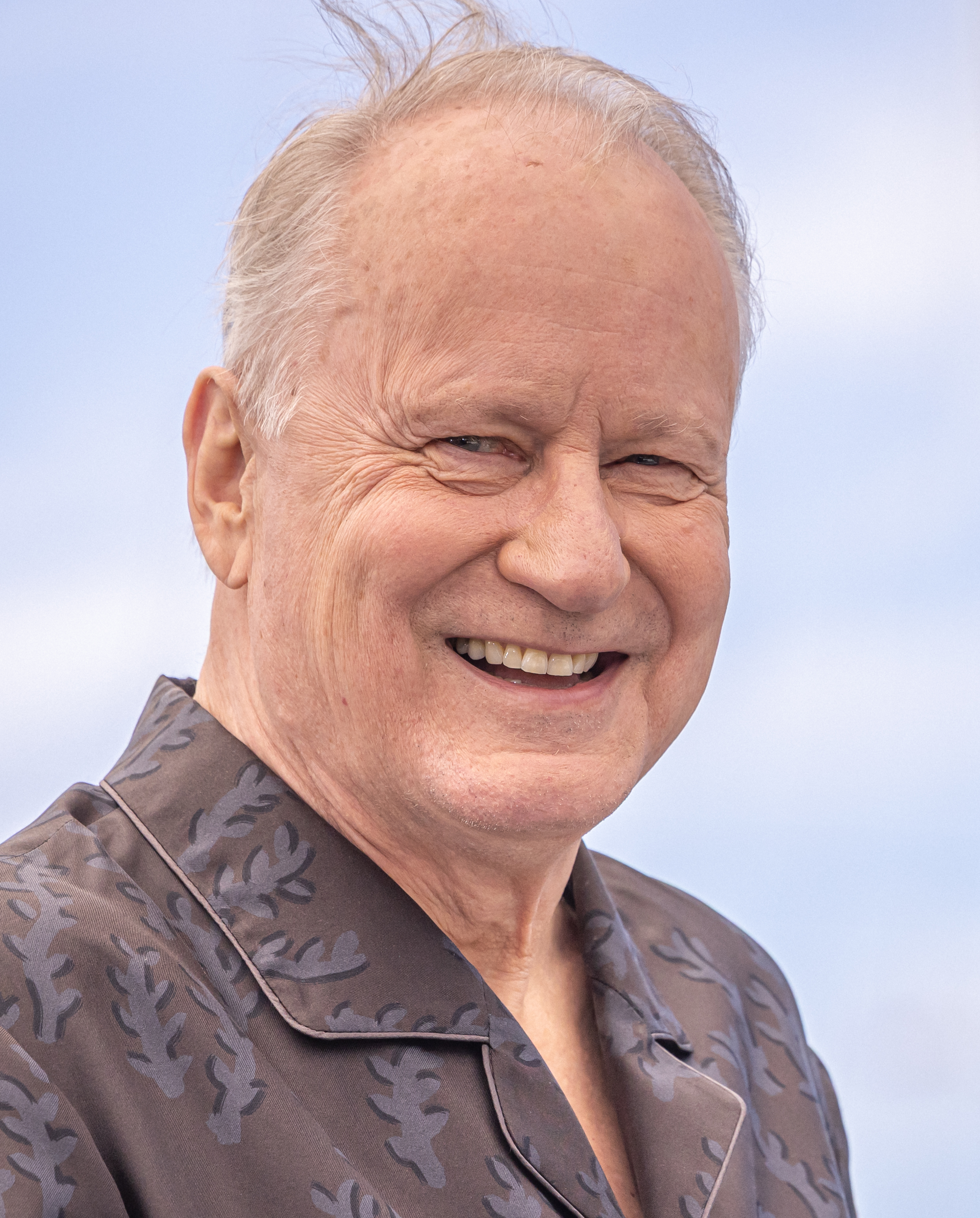
- The 2024/2025 recipient: Stellan Skarsgård
- Awarded for: Best performance of the year by a male in a supporting role in a genre television series
- Country: United States
- Presented by: Academy of Science Fiction, Fantasy and Horror Films
- First award: 1999
- Currently held by: Stellan Skarsgård for Andor (2024/2025)
- Website: www.saturnawards.org

The Saturn Award for Best Supporting Actor on Television is presented annually by the Academy of Science Fiction, Fantasy and Horror Films, honoring the work of actors in science fiction, fantasy, and horror fiction on television.

Introduced at the 26th Saturn Awards inaugural recipient of the award was Dennis Haysbert for his role as Dr. Theodore Morris in Now and Again. In 2019 and 2022, the award was split into two Best Supporting Actor in a Network or Cable Television Series and Best Supporting Actor in a Streaming Television Series, but has since returned to one combined category. The most recent winner is Jonathan Frakes as William Riker in Star Trek: Picard. Aaron Paul has the most wins in the category, with three for his role as Jesse Pinkman on Breaking Bad, while Jonathan Banks, Dough Jones, and James Marsters each have two wins for Breaking Bad, Star Trek: Discovery, and Buffy the Vampire Slayer respectively. Marsters and Michael Emerson hold the record for most nominations, with six. Kit Harington and Norman Reedus have the most nominations without a win, with four.

(NOTE: Year refers to year of eligibility, the actual ceremonies are held the following year.)

The winners are listed in bold.

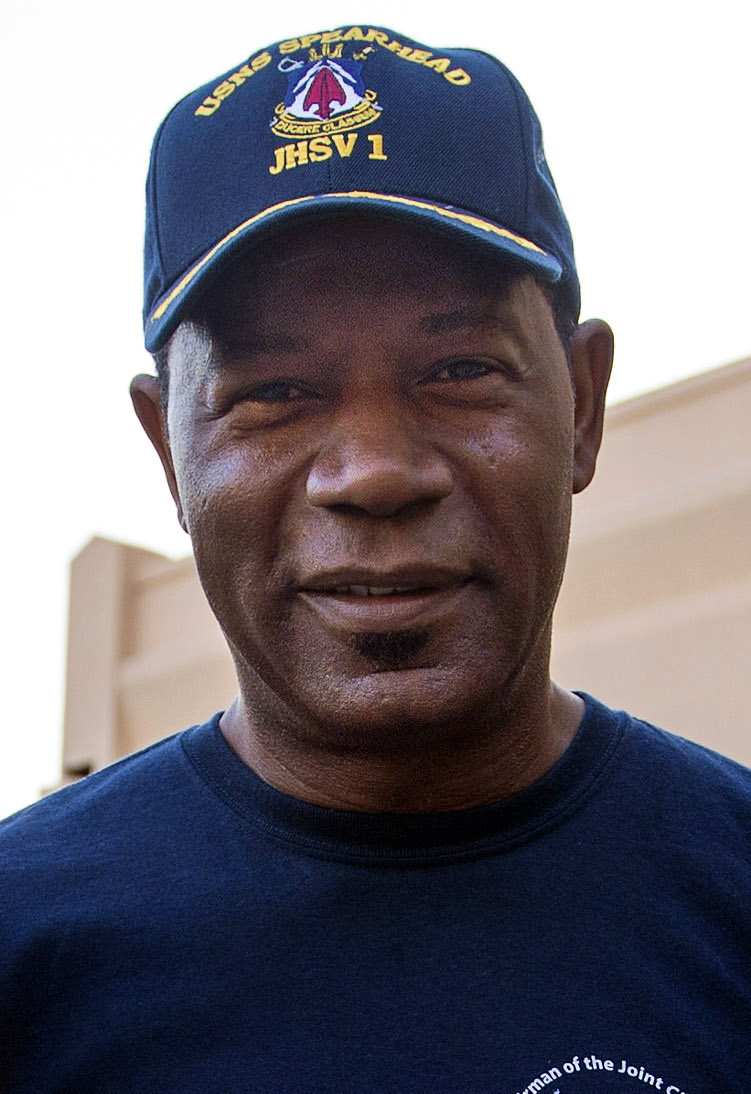
Inaugural recipient Dennis Haysbert.

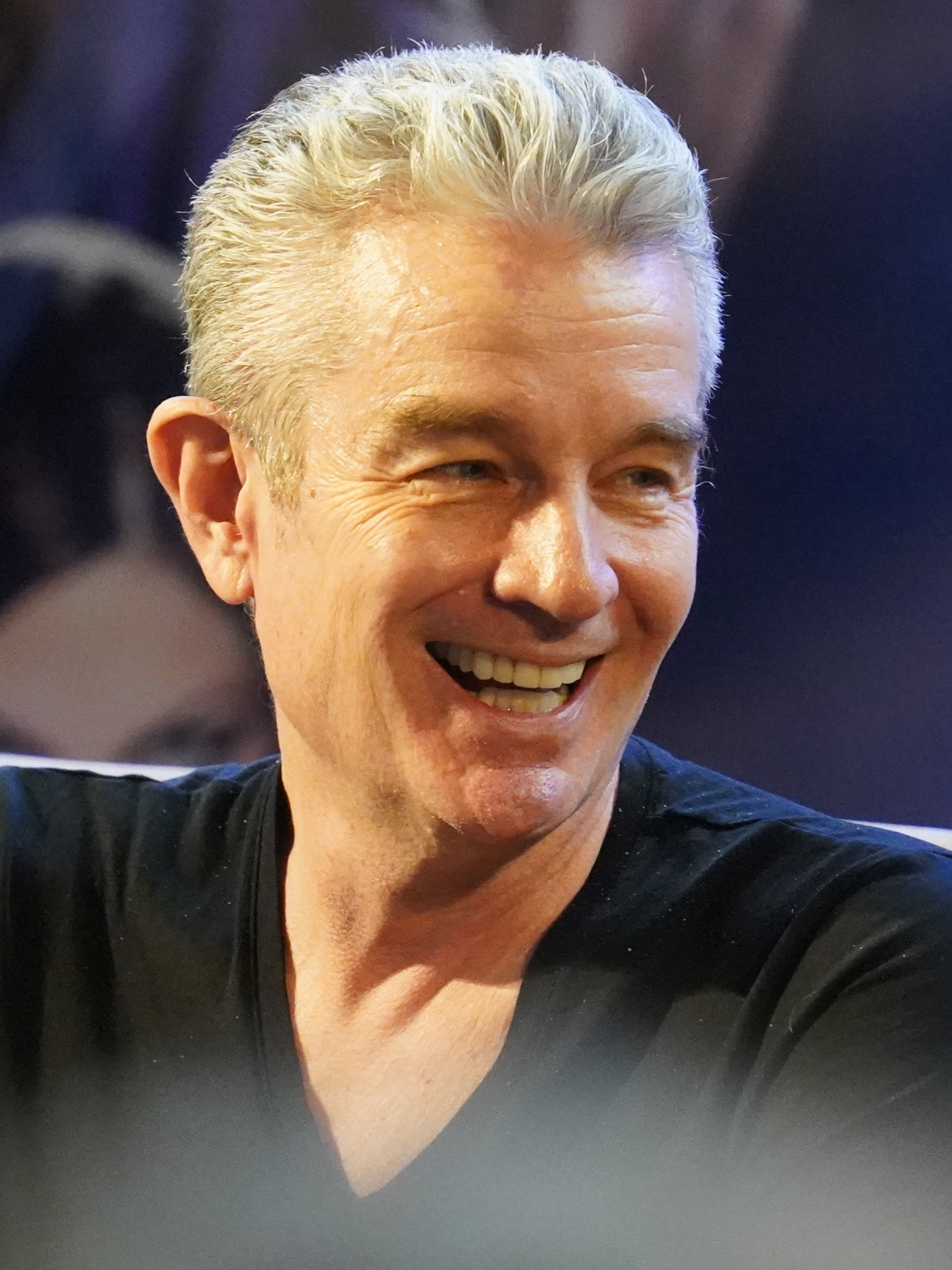
Two-time winner James Marsters.

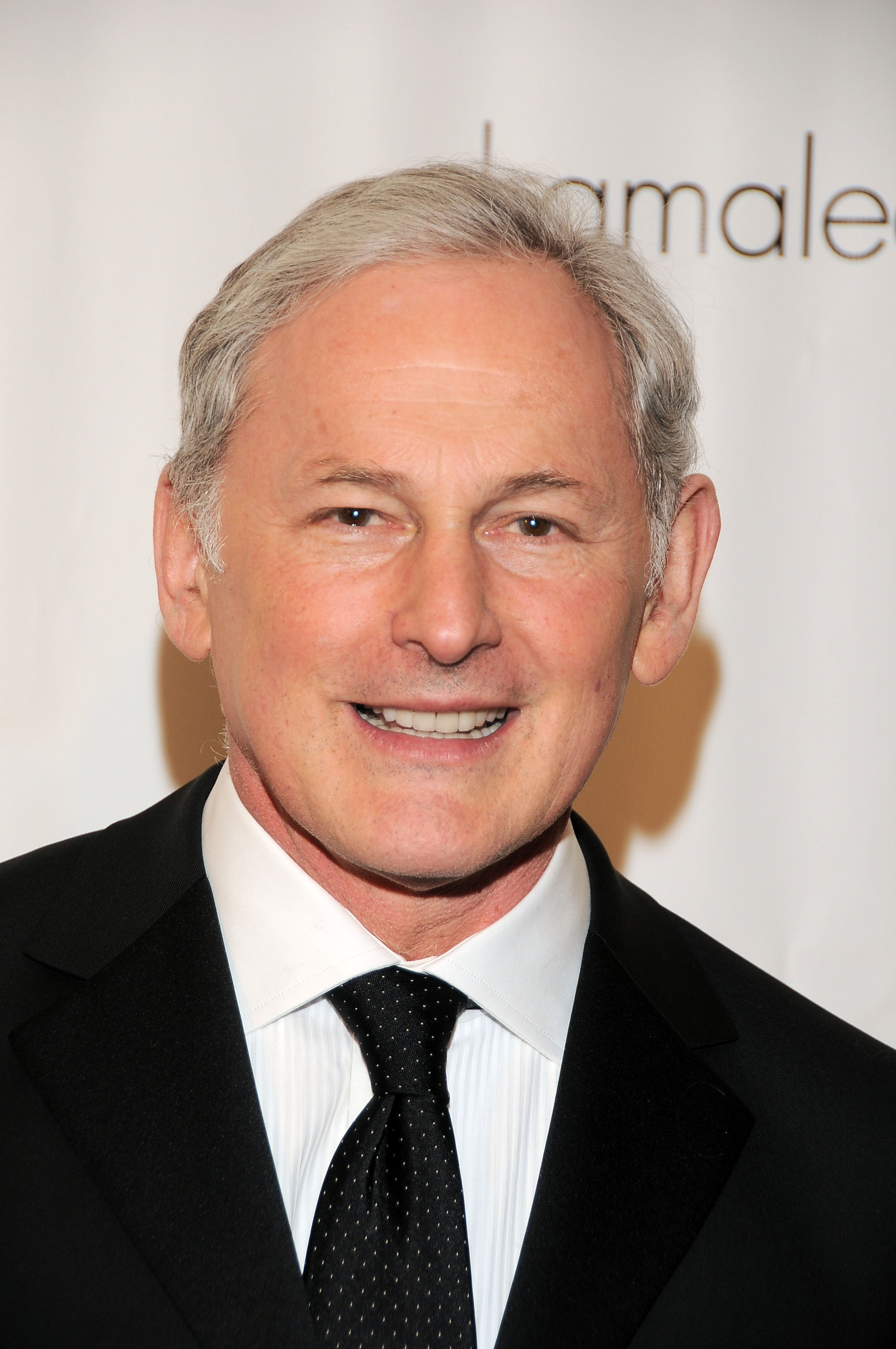
2002 honoree Victor Garber.

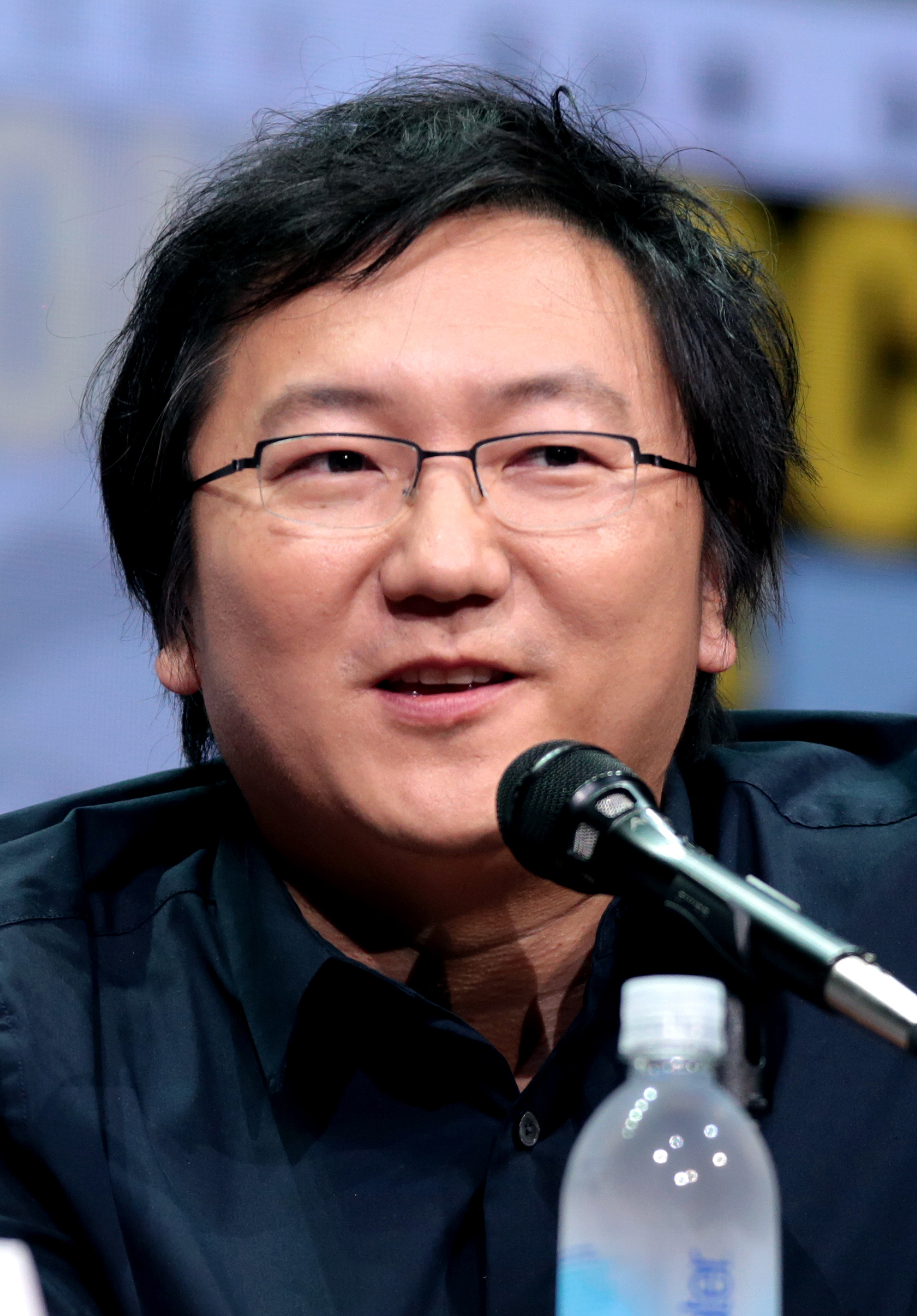
Masi Oka received the award in 2006 for his role as Hiro Nakamura in Heroes.

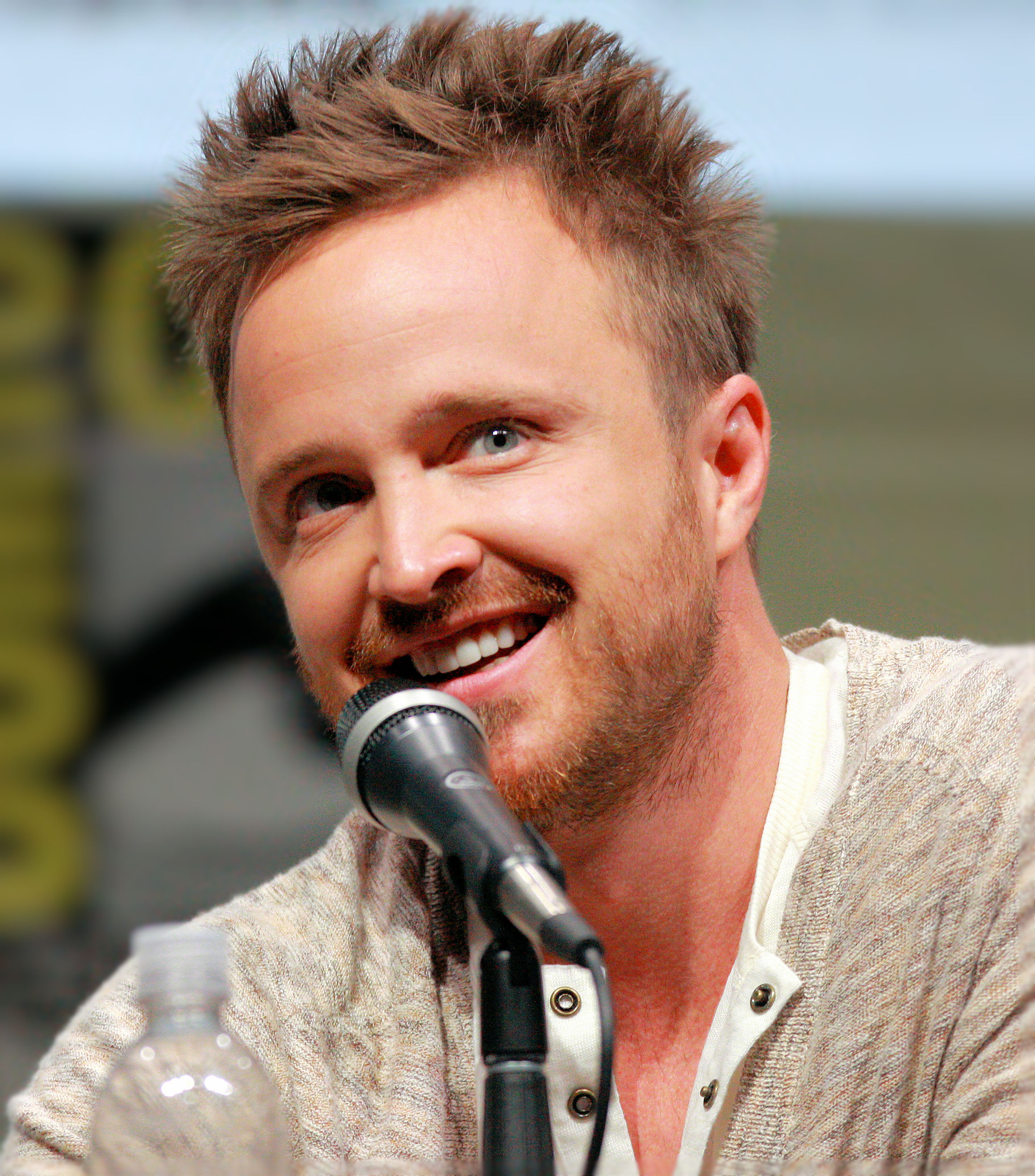
Aaron Paul has won the award three times, more than any other actor.

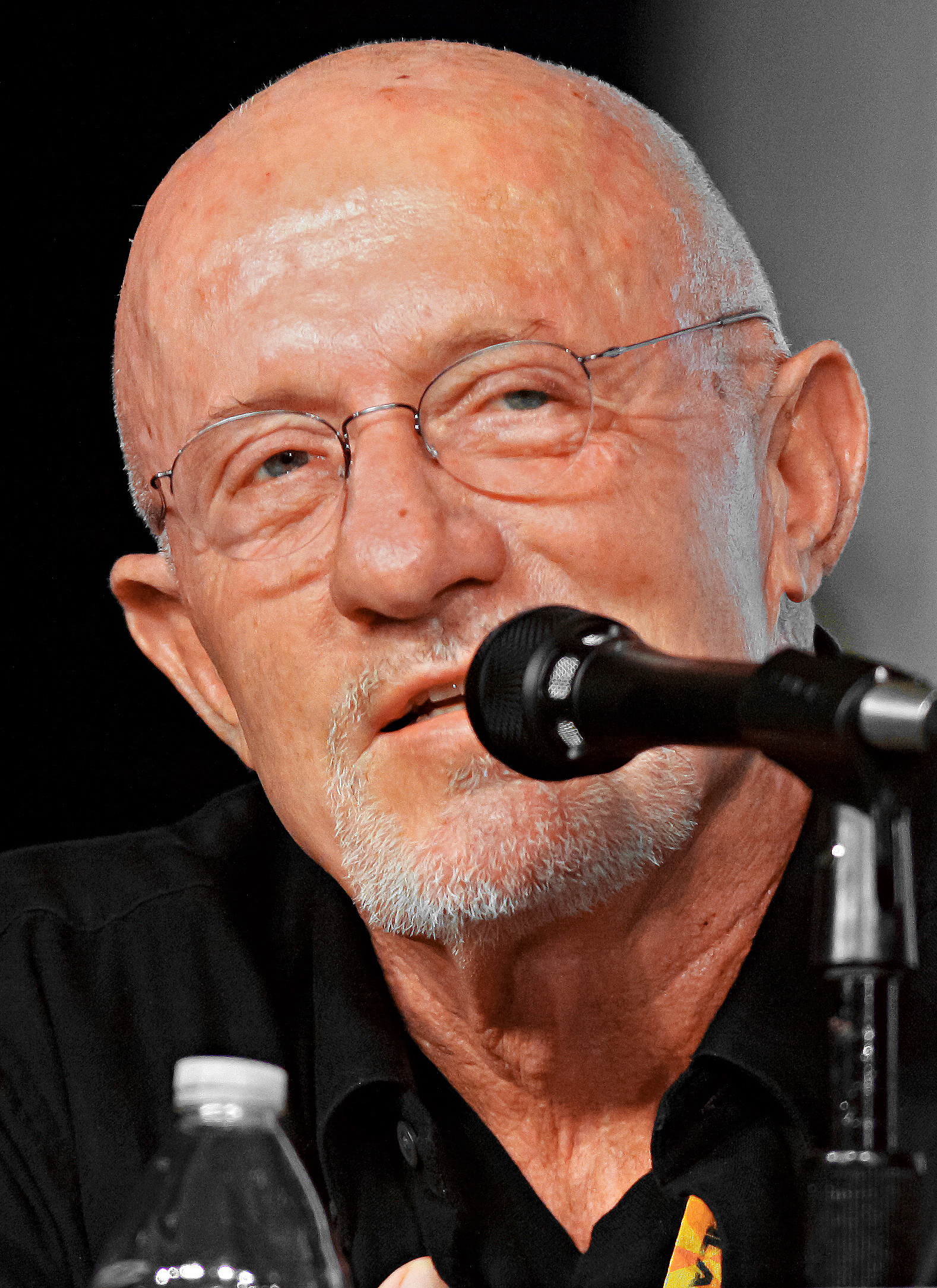
Two-time winner and four-time nominee Jonathan Banks.

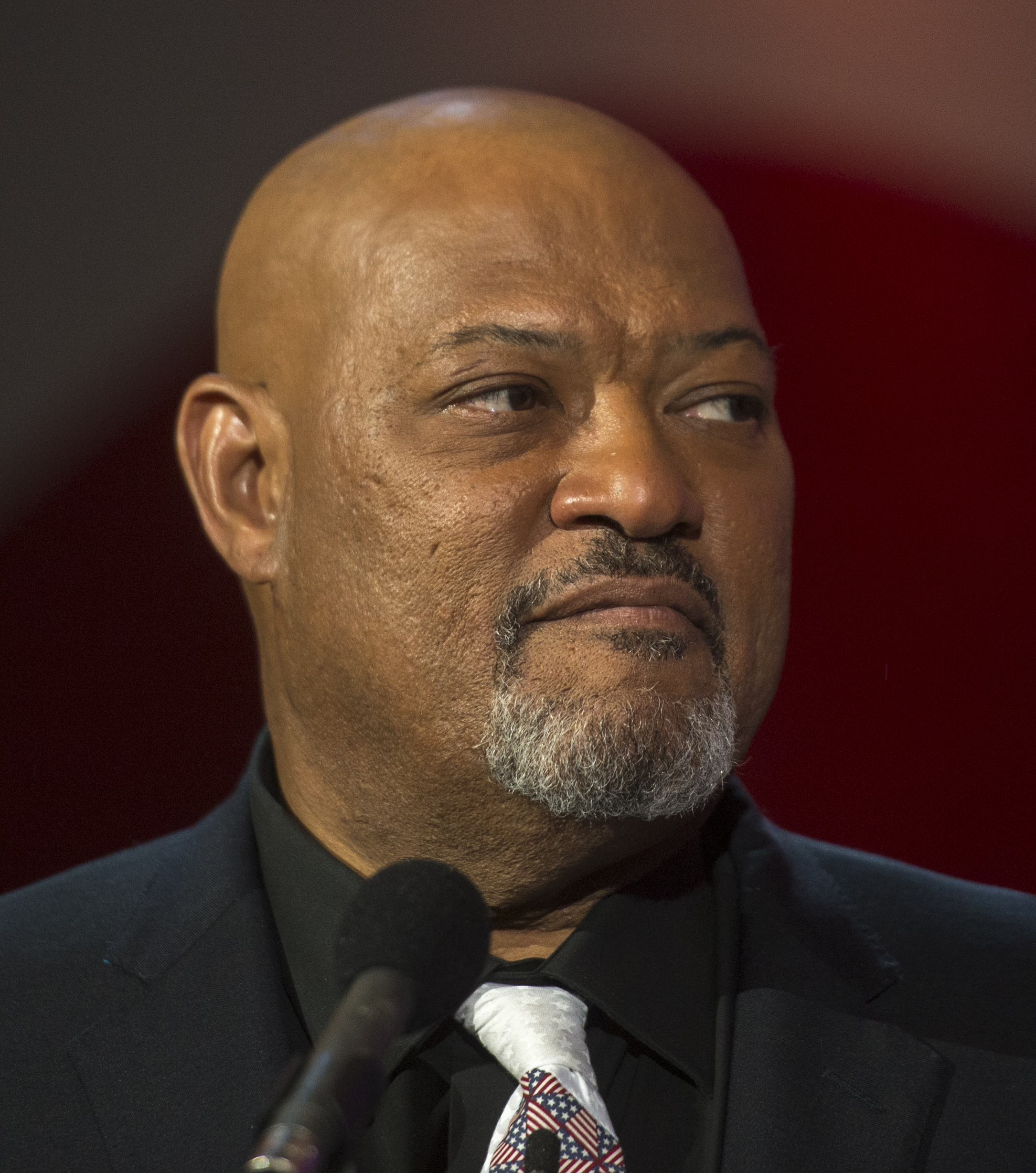
2014 winner Laurence Fishburne.

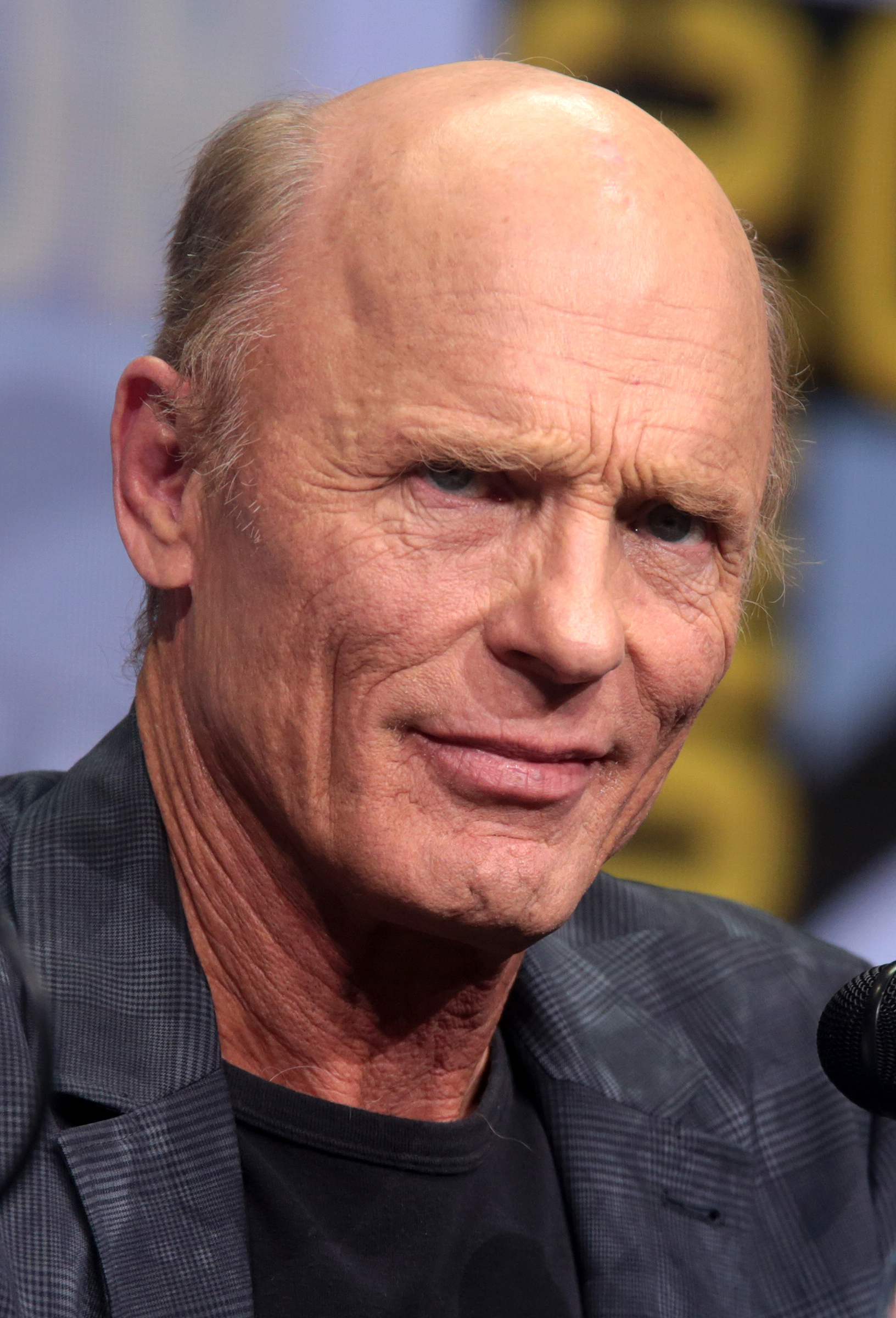
Ed Harris received the award in 2016.

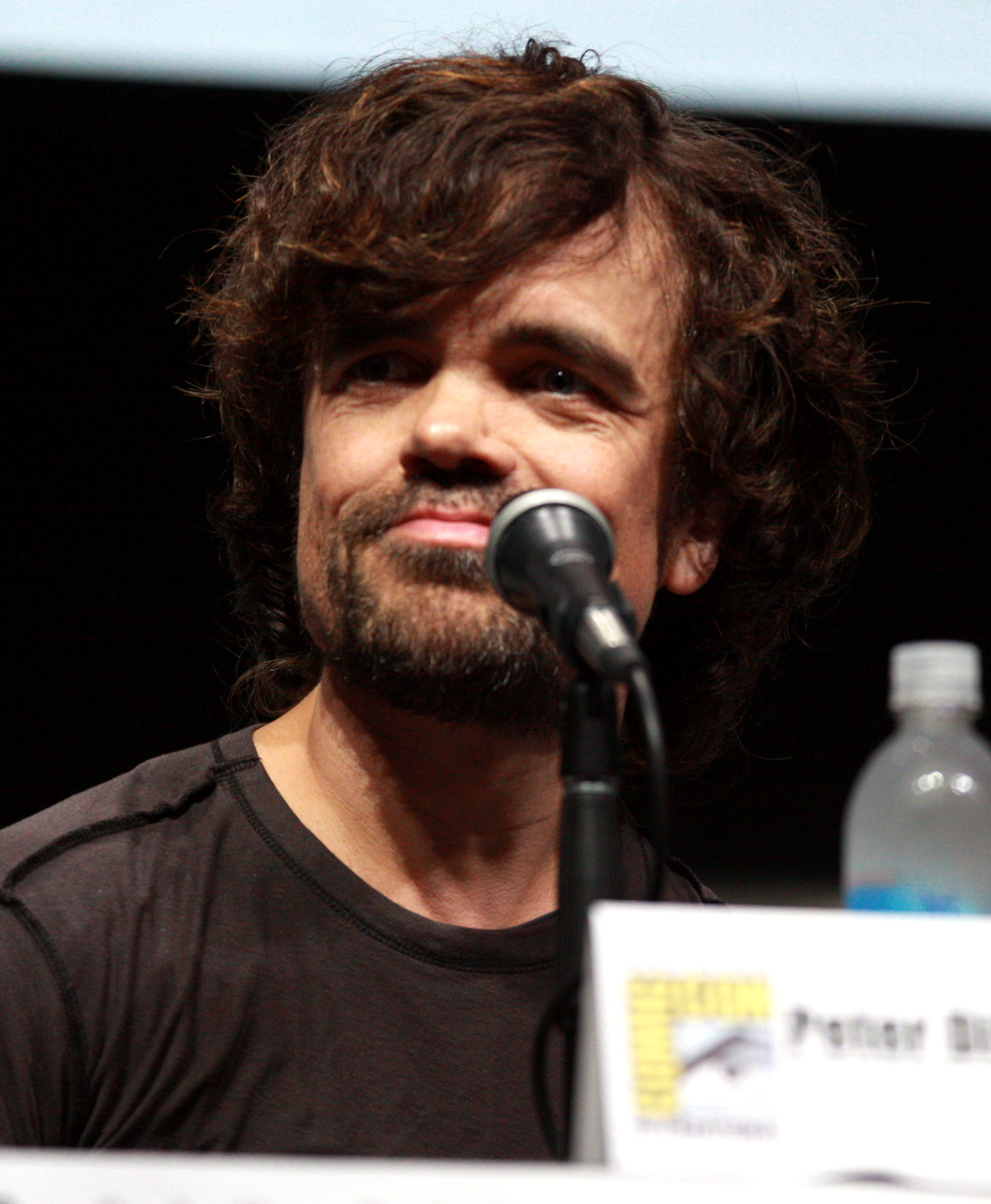
Peter Dinklage won for playing Tyrion Lannister in Game of Thrones.

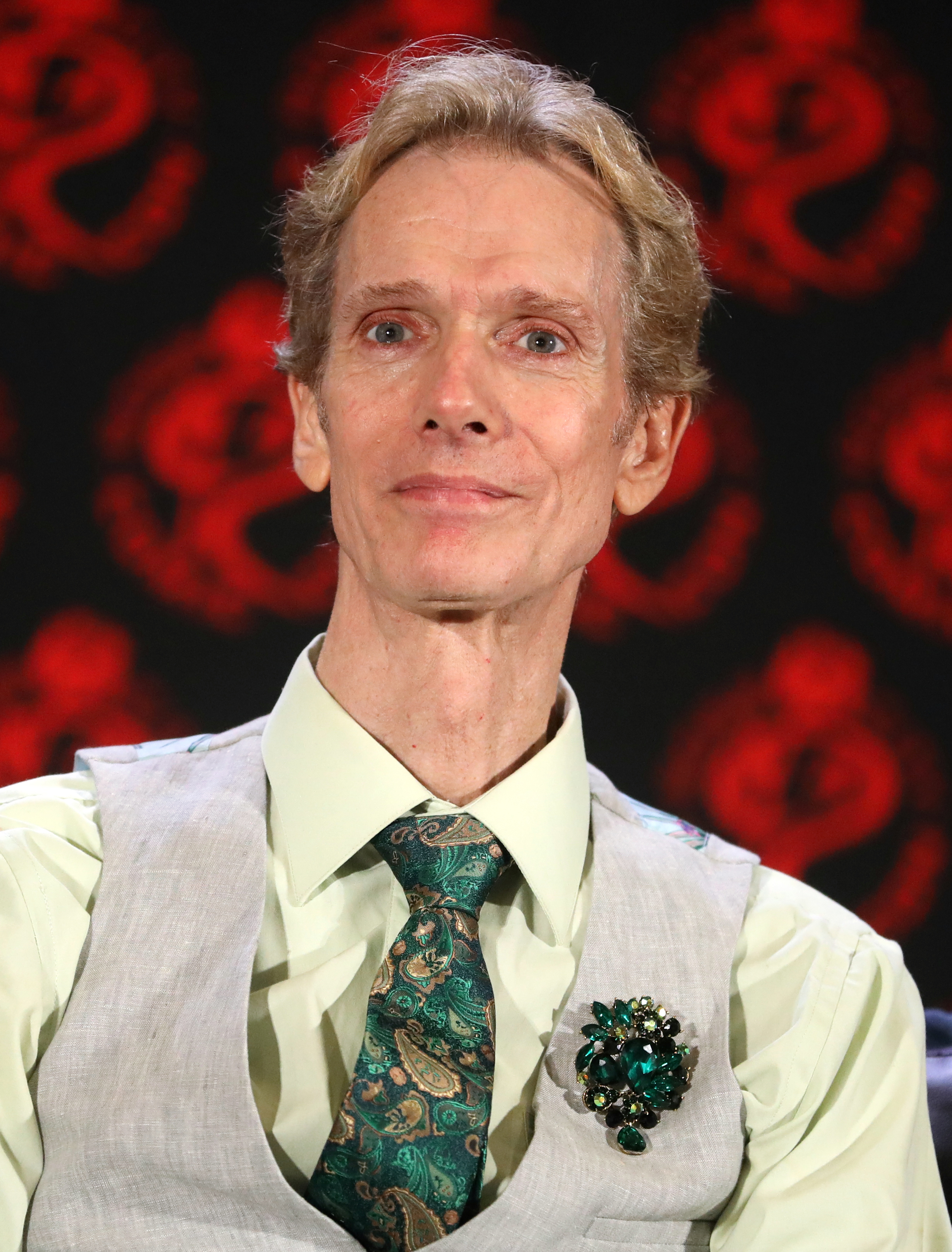
Doug Jones received the award twice for his role as Saru on Star Trek: Discovery.

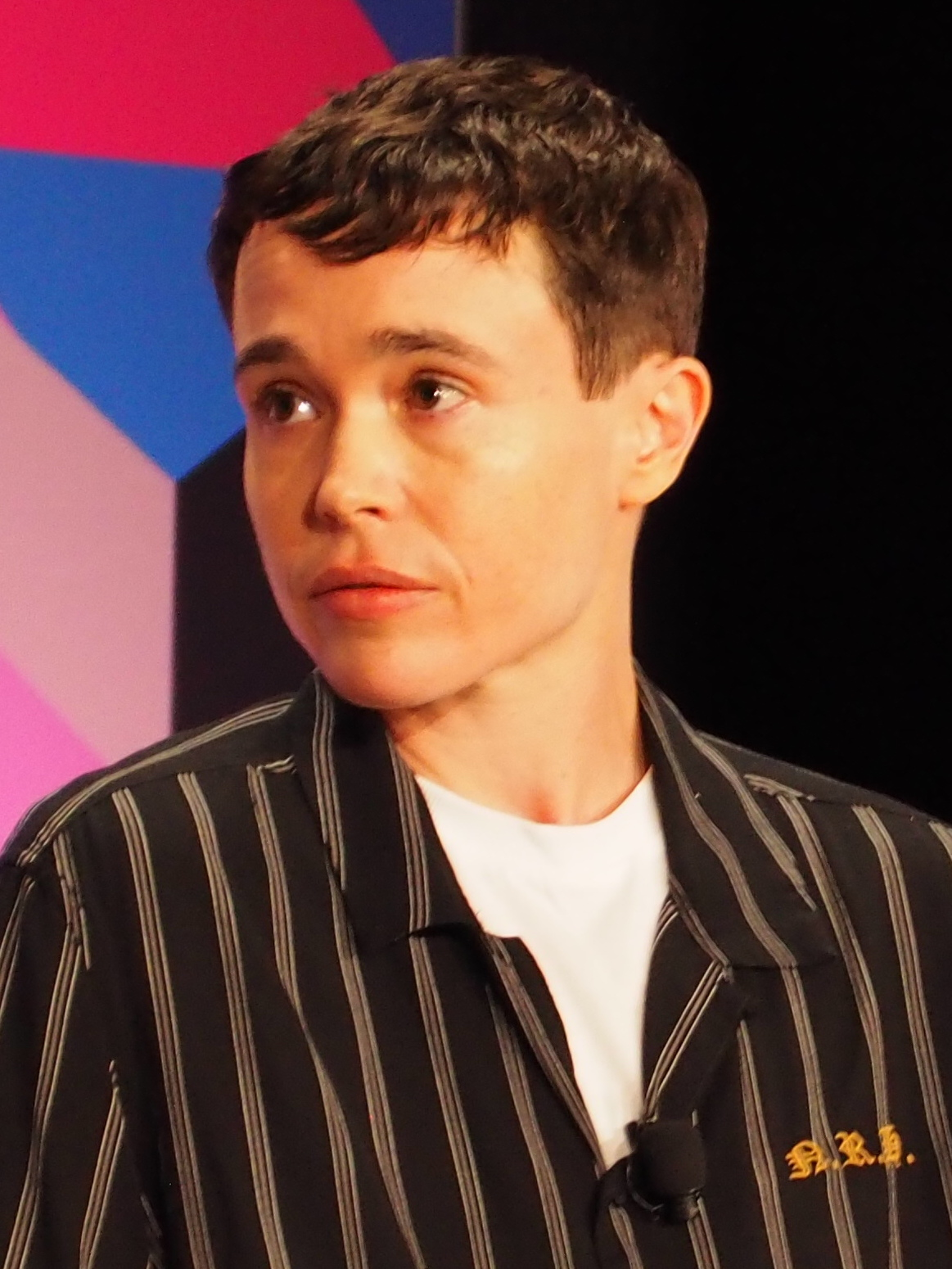
2022 winner Elliot Page.

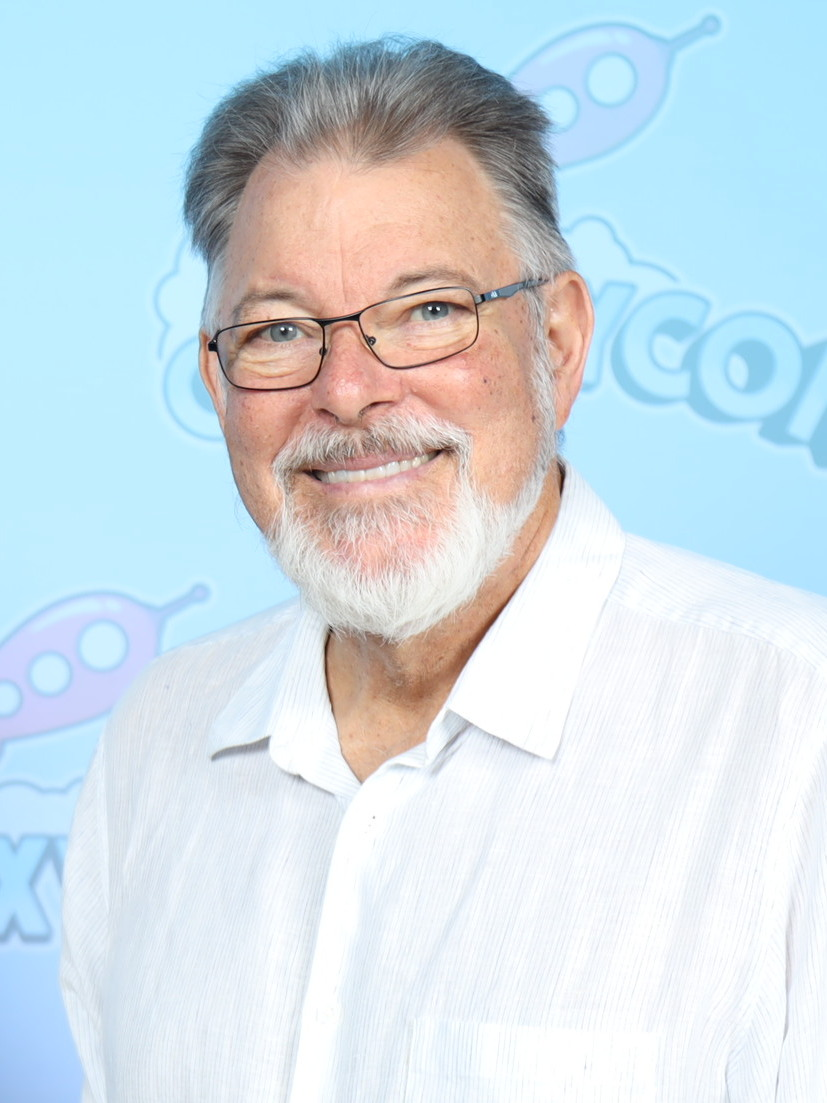
Jonathan Frakes received the award for his role as William Riker, a character he has played since 1987.

== Winners and nominees ==
=== 1990s ===
Year	Actor	Television program	Network	Character
1999 **(26th)**	**Dennis Haysbert**	**Now and Again**	**CBS**	**Dr. Theodore Morris**
1999 **(26th)**	Nicholas Brendon	Buffy the Vampire Slayer	The WB	Xander Harris
1999 **(26th)**	Colm Feore	Storm of the Century	ABC	Andre Linoge
1999 **(26th)**	Jeremy London	Journey to the Center of the Earth	USA Network	Jonas Lytton
1999 **(26th)**	James Marsters	Buffy the Vampire Slayer	The WB	Spike
1999 **(26th)**	Robert Picardo	Star Trek: Voyager	UPN	The Doctor

=== 2000s ===
Year	Actor	Television program	Network	Character
2000 **(27th)**	**James Marsters**	**Buffy the Vampire Slayer**	**The WB**	**Spike**
2000 **(27th)**	Alexis Denisof	Angel	The WB	Wesley Wyndam-Pryce
2000 **(27th)**	Brendan Fehr	Roswell	The WB	Michael Guerin
2000 **(27th)**	Anthony Head	Buffy the Vampire Slayer	The WB	Rupert Giles
2000 **(27th)**	Michael Shanks	Stargate SG-1	Showtime	Dr. Daniel Jackson
2000 **(27th)**	Michael Weatherly	Dark Angel	Fox	Logan Cale
2001 **(28th)**	**Michael Rosenbaum**	**Smallville**	**The WB**	**Lex Luthor**
2001 **(28th)**	Christopher Judge	Stargate SG-1	Showtime	Teal'c
2001 **(28th)**	James Marsters	Buffy the Vampire Slayer	The WB	Spike
2001 **(28th)**	Anthony Simcoe	Farscape	Sci-Fi	Ka D'Argo
2001 **(28th)**	Connor Trinneer	Enterprise	UPN	Commander Charles "Trip" Tucker III
2001 **(28th)**	Michael Weatherly	Dark Angel	Fox	Logan Cale
2002 **(29th)**	**Victor Garber**	**Alias**	**ABC**	**Jack Bristow**
2002 **(29th)**	Alexis Denisof	Angel	The WB	Wesley Wyndam-Pryce
2002 **(29th)**	John Glover	Smallville	The WB	Lionel Luthor
2002 **(29th)**	James Marsters	Buffy the Vampire Slayer	UPN	Spike
2002 **(29th)**	Michael Rosenbaum	Smallville	The WB	Lex Luthor
2002 **(29th)**	Connor Trinneer	Enterprise	UPN	Commander Charles "Trip" Tucker III
2003 **(30th)**	**James Marsters**	**Buffy the Vampire Slayer** & **Angel**	**The WB** & **UPN**	**Spike**
2003 **(30th)**	Alexis Denisof	Angel	The WB	Wesley Wyndam-Pryce
2003 **(30th)**	Victor Garber	Alias	ABC	Jack Bristow
2003 **(30th)**	John Glover	Smallville	The WB	Lionel Luthor
2003 **(30th)**	Michael Rosenbaum	Smallville	The WB	Lex Luthor
2003 **(30th)**	Nick Stahl	Carnivàle	HBO	Ben Hawkins
2004 **(31st)**	**Terry O'Quinn**	**Lost**	**ABC**	**John Locke**
2004 **(31st)**	Kyle MacLachlan	The Librarian: Quest for the Spear	TNT	Edward Wilde
2004 **(31st)**	James Marsters	Angel	The WB	Spike
2004 **(31st)**	Dominic Monaghan	Lost	ABC	Charlie Pace
2004 **(31st)**	Michael Rosenbaum	Smallville	The WB	Lex Luthor
2004 **(31st)**	Michael Shanks	Stargate SG-1	Sci-Fi	Dr. Daniel Jackson
2005 **(32nd)**	**James Callis**	**Battlestar Galactica**	Sci-Fi	**Dr. Gaius Baltar**
2005 **(32nd)**	Adewale Akinnuoye-Agbaje	Lost	ABC	Mr. Eko
2005 **(32nd)**	Jamie Bamber	Battlestar Galactica	Sci-Fi	Captain Lee "Apollo" Adama
2005 **(32nd)**	Sam Neill	The Triangle	Sci-Fi	Eric Benirall
2005 **(32nd)**	Terry O'Quinn	Lost	ABC	John Locke
2005 **(32nd)**	Michael Rosenbaum	Smallville	The WB	Lex Luthor
2006 **(33rd)**	**Masi Oka**	**Heroes**	**NBC**	**Hiro Nakamura**
2006 **(33rd)**	James Callis	Battlestar Galactica	Sci-Fi	Dr. Gaius Baltar
2006 **(33rd)**	Michael Emerson	Lost	ABC	Henry Gale/Ben Linus
2006 **(33rd)**	Greg Grunberg	Heroes	NBC	Matt Parkman
2006 **(33rd)**	Josh Holloway	Lost	ABC	James "Sawyer" Ford
2006 **(33rd)**	James Remar	Dexter	Showtime	Harry Morgan
2007 **(34th)**	**Michael Emerson**	**Lost**	**ABC**	**Benjamin Linus**
2007 **(34th)**	Greg Grunberg	Heroes	NBC	Matt Parkman
2007 **(34th)**	Josh Holloway	Lost	ABC	James "Sawyer" Ford
2007 **(34th)**	Erik King	Dexter	Showtime	Sgt. James Doakes
2007 **(34th)**	Terry O'Quinn	Lost	ABC	John Locke
2007 **(34th)**	Masi Oka	Heroes	NBC	Hiro Nakamura
2008 **(35th)**	**Adrian Pasdar**	**Heroes**	**NBC**	**Nathan Petrelli**
2008 **(35th)**	Henry Ian Cusick	Lost	ABC	Desmond Hume
2008 **(35th)**	Thomas Dekker	Terminator: The Sarah Connor Chronicles	Fox	John Connor
2008 **(35th)**	Michael Emerson	Lost	ABC	Benjamin Linus
2008 **(35th)**	Josh Holloway	Lost	ABC	James "Sawyer" Ford
2008 **(35th)**	Milo Ventimiglia	Heroes	NBC	Peter Petrelli
2009 **(36th)**	**Aaron Paul**	**Breaking Bad**	**AMC**	**Jesse Pinkman**
2009 **(36th)**	Jeremy Davies	Lost	ABC	Daniel Faraday
2009 **(36th)**	Michael Emerson	Lost	ABC	Benjamin Linus
2009 **(36th)**	Aldis Hodge	Leverage	TNT	Alec Hardison
2009 **(36th)**	John Noble	Fringe	Fox	Dr. Walter Bishop
2009 **(36th)**	Alexander Skarsgård	True Blood	HBO	Eric Northman

=== 2010s ===
Year	Actor	Television program	Network	Character
2010 **(37th)**	**John Noble**	**Fringe**	**Fox**	**Walter Bishop / Walternate**
2010 **(37th)**	Michael Emerson	Lost	ABC	Benjamin Linus
2010 **(37th)**	Dean Norris	Breaking Bad	AMC	Hank Schrader
2010 **(37th)**	Terry O'Quinn	Lost	ABC	John Locke / Man in Black
2010 **(37th)**	Aaron Paul	Breaking Bad	AMC	Jesse Pinkman
2010 **(37th)**	Lance Reddick	Fringe	Fox	Phillip Broyles
2010 **(37th)**	Steven Yeun	The Walking Dead	AMC	Glenn Rhee
2011 **(38th)**	**Aaron Paul**	**Breaking Bad**	**AMC**	**Jesse Pinkman**
2011 **(38th)**	Giancarlo Esposito	Breaking Bad	AMC	Gustavo "Gus" Fring
2011 **(38th)**	Kit Harington	Game of Thrones	HBO	Jon Snow
2011 **(38th)**	Joel Kinnaman	The Killing	AMC	Stephen Holder
2011 **(38th)**	John Noble	Fringe	Fox	Walter Bishop / Walternate
2011 **(38th)**	Bill Pullman	Torchwood: Miracle Day	Starz	Oswald Danes
2011 **(38th)**	Norman Reedus	The Walking Dead	AMC	Daryl Dixon
2012 **(39th)**	**Jonathan Banks**	**Breaking Bad**	**AMC**	**Mike Ehrmantraut**
2012 **(39th)**	Giancarlo Esposito	Revolution	NBC	Tom Neville
2012 **(39th)**	Todd Lasance	Spartacus: War of the Damned	Starz	Julius Caesar
2012 **(39th)**	Colm Meaney	Hell on Wheels	AMC	Thomas "Doc" Durant
2012 **(39th)**	David Morrissey	The Walking Dead	AMC	The Governor
2012 **(39th)**	John Noble	Fringe	Fox	Walter Bishop / Walternate
2013 **(40th)**	**Aaron Paul**	**Breaking Bad**	**AMC**	**Jesse Pinkman**
2013 **(40th)**	Nikolaj Coster-Waldau	Game of Thrones	HBO	Jaime Lannister
2013 **(40th)**	Erik Knudsen	Continuum	Syfy	Alec Sadler
2013 **(40th)**	David Lyons	Revolution	NBC	Sebastian "Bass" Monroe
2013 **(40th)**	Dean Norris	Under the Dome	CBS	James "Big Jim" Rennie
2013 **(40th)**	James Purefoy	The Following	Fox	Joe Carroll
2014 **(41st)**	**Laurence Fishburne**	**Hannibal**	**NBC**	**Jack Crawford**
2014 **(41st)**	David Bradley	The Strain	FX	Abraham Setrakian
2014 **(41st)**	Sam Heughan	Outlander	Starz	Jamie Fraser
2014 **(41st)**	Erik Knudsen	Continuum	Syfy	Alec Sadler
2014 **(41st)**	Norman Reedus	The Walking Dead	AMC	Daryl Dixon
2014 **(41st)**	Richard Sammel	The Strain	FX	Thomas Eichorst
2015 **(42nd)**	**Richard Armitage**	**Hannibal**	**NBC**	**Francis Dolarhyde**
2015 **(42nd)**	Vincent D'Onofrio	Daredevil	Netflix	Wilson Fisk / Kingpin
2015 **(42nd)**	Kit Harington	Game of Thrones	HBO	Jon Snow
2015 **(42nd)**	Toby Jones	Wayward Pines	Fox	David Pilcher / Dr. Jenkins
2015 **(42nd)**	Erik Knudsen	Continuum	Syfy	Alec Sadler
2015 **(42nd)**	Lance Reddick	Bosch	Amazon	Irvin Irving
2015 **(42nd)**	David Tennant	Jessica Jones	Netflix	Kilgrave
2015 **(42nd)**	Patrick Wilson	Fargo	FX	Lou Solverson
2016 **(43rd)**	**Ed Harris**	**Westworld**	**HBO**	**The Man in Black**
2016 **(43rd)**	Linden Ashby	Teen Wolf	MTV	Sheriff Stilinski
2016 **(43rd)**	Mehcad Brooks	Supergirl	The CW	James Olsen
2016 **(43rd)**	Kit Harington	Game of Thrones	HBO	Jon Snow
2016 **(43rd)**	Lee Majors	Ash vs Evil Dead	Starz	Brock Williams
2016 **(43rd)**	Norman Reedus	The Walking Dead	AMC	Daryl Dixon
2016 **(43rd)**	Jeffrey Wright	Westworld	HBO	Bernard Lowe
2017 **(44th)**	**Michael McKean**	**Better Call Saul**	**AMC**	**Chuck McGill**
2017 **(44th)**	Nikolaj Coster-Waldau	Game of Thrones	HBO	Jaime Lannister
2017 **(44th)**	Miguel Ferrer (posthumously)	Twin Peaks: The Return	Showtime	Albert Rosenfield
2017 **(44th)**	Kit Harington	Game of Thrones	HBO	Jon Snow
2017 **(44th)**	Doug Jones	Star Trek: Discovery	CBS All Access	Commander Saru
2017 **(44th)**	Christian Kane	The Librarians	TNT	Jacob Stone
2017 **(44th)**	Khary Payton	The Walking Dead	AMC	King Ezekiel
2017 **(44th)**	Evan Peters	American Horror Story: Cult	FX	Kai Anderson, Andy Warhol, Marshall Applewhite, David Koresh, Jim Jones, Jesus, Charles Manson
2018/2019 **(45th)**	Network/Cable			
2018/2019 **(45th)**	**Peter Dinklage**	**Game of Thrones**	**HBO**	**Tyrion Lannister**
2018/2019 **(45th)**	Jonathan Banks	Better Call Saul	AMC	Mike Ehrmantraut
2018/2019 **(45th)**	Nikolaj Coster-Waldau	Game of Thrones	HBO	Jaime Lannister
2018/2019 **(45th)**	David Harewood	Supergirl	The CW	J'onn J'onzz
2018/2019 **(45th)**	Ed Harris	Westworld	HBO	The Man in Black
2018/2019 **(45th)**	Lennie James	Fear the Walking Dead	AMC	Morgan Jones
2018/2019 **(45th)**	Khary Payton	The Walking Dead	AMC	King Ezekiel
2018/2019 **(45th)**	Streaming			
2018/2019 **(45th)**	**Doug Jones**	**Star Trek: Discovery**	**CBS All Access**	**Saru**
2018/2019 **(45th)**	Wilson Cruz	Star Trek: Discovery	CBS All Access	Hugh Culber
2018/2019 **(45th)**	Michiel Huisman	The Haunting of Hill House	Netflix	Steven Crain
2018/2019 **(45th)**	Timothy Hutton	The Haunting of Hill House	Netflix	Hugh Crain
2018/2019 **(45th)**	Maxwell Jenkins	Lost in Space	Netflix	Will Robinson
2018/2019 **(45th)**	Ethan Peck	Star Trek: Discovery	CBS All Access	Spock
2018/2019 **(45th)**	Michael Sheen	Good Omens	Prime Video	Aziraphale
2019/2020 **(46th)**	**Doug Jones**	**Star Trek: Discovery**	**CBS All Access**	**Saru**
2019/2020 **(46th)**	Jonathan Banks	Better Call Saul	AMC	Mike Ehrmantraut
2019/2020 **(46th)**	Tony Dalton	Better Call Saul	AMC	Lalo Salamanca
2019/2020 **(46th)**	Michael Emerson	Evil	CBS	Dr. Leland Townsend
2019/2020 **(46th)**	Richard Rankin	Outlander	Starz	Roger Wakefield
2019/2020 **(46th)**	Norman Reedus	The Walking Dead	AMC	Daryl Dixon
2019/2020 **(46th)**	Luke Wilson	Stargirl	The CW	Pat Dugan / S.T.R.I.P.E.

=== 2020s ===
Year	Actor	Television program	Network	Character
2021/2022 **(50th)**
2021/2022 **(50th)**	Network/Cable			
2021/2022 **(50th)**	**Jonathan Banks**	**Better Call Saul**	**AMC**	**Mike Ehrmantraut**
2021/2022 **(50th)**	Tony Dalton	Better Call Saul	AMC	Lalo Salamanca
2021/2022 **(50th)**	Patrick Fabian	Better Call Saul	AMC	Howard Hamlin
2021/2022 **(50th)**	Harvey Guillén	What We Do in the Shadows	FX	Guillermo de la Cruz
2021/2022 **(50th)**	Brandon Scott Jones	Ghosts	CBS	Captain Isaac Higgintoot
2021/2022 **(50th)**	Michael Mando	Better Call Saul	AMC	Nacho Varga
2021/2022 **(50th)**	Michael James Shaw	The Walking Dead	AMC	Michael Mercer
2021/2022 **(50th)**	Streaming			
2021/2022 **(50th)**	**Elliot Page**	**The Umbrella Academy**	**Netflix**	**Viktor Hargreeves**
2021/2022 **(50th)**	Zach Cherry	Severance	Apple TV+	Dylan
2021/2022 **(50th)**	Ethan Hawke	Moon Knight	Disney+	Arthur Harrow
2021/2022 **(50th)**	Joel Kinnaman	For All Mankind	Apple TV+	Ed Baldwin
2021/2022 **(50th)**	Ethan Peck	Star Trek: Strange New Worlds	Paramount+	Spock
2021/2022 **(50th)**	Joseph Quinn	Stranger Things	Netflix	Eddie Munson
2021/2022 **(50th)**	John Turturro	Severance	Apple TV+	Irving
2022/2023 **(51st)**	**Jonathan Frakes**	**Star Trek: Picard**	**Paramount+**	**Captain William Riker**
2022/2023 **(51st)**	Harvey Guillén	What We Do in the Shadows	FX / Hulu	Guillermo de la Cruz
2022/2023 **(51st)**	Ernie Hudson	Quantum Leap	NBC	Herbert "Magic" Williams
2022/2023 **(51st)**	Ethan Peck	Star Trek: Strange New Worlds	Paramount+	Spock
2022/2023 **(51st)**	Matt Smith	House of the Dragon	HBO / Max	Prince Daemon Targaryen
2022/2023 **(51st)**	Ed Speleers	Star Trek: Picard	Paramount+	Jack Crusher
2022/2023 **(51st)**	Todd Stashwick	Star Trek: Picard	Paramount+	Captain Liam Shaw
2023/2024 **(52nd)**	**Antony Starr**	**The Boys**	**Prime Video**	**Homelander**
2023/2024 **(52nd)**	Matt Berry	What We Do in the Shadows	FX	Leslie "Laszlo" Cravensworth
2023/2024 **(52nd)**	Brandon Scott Jones	Ghosts	CBS	Captain Isaac Higgintoot
2023/2024 **(52nd)**	Lamorne Morris	Fargo	FX	Deputy Whitley "Witt" Farr
2023/2024 **(52nd)**	Aaron Moten	Fallout	Prime Video	Maximus
2023/2024 **(52nd)**	Matt Smith	House of the Dragon	HBO	Daemon Targaryen
2023/2024 **(52nd)**	Henry Thomas	The Fall of the House of Usher	Netflix	Frederick Usher
2024/2025 **(53rd)**	**Stellan Skarsgård**	**Andor**	**Disney+**	**Luthen Rael**
2024/2025 **(53rd)**	Jack Alcott	Dexter: Resurrection	Paramount+	Harrison Morgan
2024/2025 **(53rd)**	Babou Ceesay	Alien: Earth	FX	Morrow
2024/2025 **(53rd)**	William Fichtner	Talamasca: The Secret Order	AMC	Jasper
2024/2025 **(53rd)**	Jude Law	Star Wars: Skeleton Crew	Disney+	Jod Na Nawood
2024/2025 **(53rd)**	James Marsden	Paradise	Hulu	President Cal Bradford
2024/2025 **(53rd)**	Ethan Peck	Star Trek: Strange New Worlds	Paramount+	Spock

== Multiple nominations ==
6 nominations

- Michael Emerson
- James Marsters

5 nominations

- Michael Rosenbaum

4 nominations

- Jonathan Banks
- Kit Harington
- John Noble
- Terry O'Quinn
- Aaron Paul
- Norman Reedus

3 nominations

- Nikolaj Coster-Waldau
- Alexis Denisof
- Josh Holloway
- Doug Jones
- Erik Knudsen
- Ethan Peck

2 nominations

- James Callis
- Tony Dalton
- Giancarlo Esposito
- Victor Garber
- John Glover
- Greg Grunberg
- Ed Harris
- Brandon Scott Jones
- Dean Norris
- Masi Oka
- Khary Payton
- Lance Reddick
- Michael Shanks
- Matt Smith
- Connor Trinneer
- Michael Weatherly

== Multiple wins ==
3 wins

- Aaron Paul

2 wins

- Jonathan Banks
- Doug Jones
- James Marsters
