= The Night Shift season 2 =

Season of television series

The Night Shift
- Season 2
- Season 2 DVD cover
- No. of episodes: 14

Release
- Original network: NBC
- Original release: February 23 – May 18, 2015

Season chronology
- ← Previous; Season 1 Next → Season 3

The second season of the medical drama series The Night Shift aired between February 23, 2015 and May 18, 2015, on NBC in the United States. It was produced by Sachs/Judah Productions, and Sony Pictures Television with series creators Gabe Sachs and Jeff Judah serving as executive producers.

The series follows the overnight shift at San Antonio Medical Center, where three of the surgeons have a connection to the U.S. military. Dr. TC Callahan (Eoin Macken) is an ex-Army medic who initially exhibits PTSD-type symptoms, having watched his brother die right in front of him on the battlefield. He tends to go his own way at the hospital, frequently breaking rules and butting heads with his ex-girlfriend and newly appointed head of the night shift, Dr. Jordan Alexander (Jill Flint), and the hospital's former administrator, Michael Ragosa (Freddy Rodriguez).

The Night Shift was renewed for a 14-episode second season on July 1, 2014. On May 8, 2015, it was renewed for a third season, which is expected to air as a midseason replacement in the 2015-16 Television season.

The first episode of the season premiered to 5.52 million viewers, and a 1.5/4 adults 18-49 rating. The season finale dropped to 5.20 million viewers with a 1.2/4 18-49 rating.

== Production ==
The Night Shift was renewed for a second season on July 1, 2014, and when Gabe Sachs received the call, he described it as "the greatest moment ever, amazing." On December 12, 2014, it was revealed that the show would be returning on February 23, 2015 in the post-Voice time slot. At a TCA Press Panel, series creators Jeff Judah and Gabe Sachs both said that the new timeslot with such a powerful lead-in was "a really big deal for us."

The producers stated that they would not take on the Ebola outbreak as a subject in the second season because they didn't "know where that's going to go;" instead they are going to focus on odd and crazy stories in the headlines. Filming for the second season began on November 10, 2014 in Albuquerque, New Mexico. "Fog of War" was not written as the sixth episode of the season. It was aired out of order and as a result, there are timeline inconsistencies. It was written to air earlier in the season.

=== Casting ===
The role of Landry de la Cruz (portrayed by Daniella Alonso), the lone psychiatrist on the night shift, was scrapped for season 2 amid "changes in the creative direction" of the show. At A TCA Press Panel, executive producer Jeff Judah stated that "we're opening up and getting more surgery and more of the paramedic world." Series creator, and executive producer Gabe Sachs added that "creatively we just decided to focus more on the ER stuff." On October 30, 2014, it was revealed that Adam Rodríguez would be joining the cast as a recurring character, Dr. Joey Chavez, a newly hired trauma surgeon. He is an Air Force Veteran who fought in Iraq, and brings an Eastern Medicine perspective to his cases. On November 7, 2014, Merle Dandridge was cast for a recurring role of Gwen Gaskin, "a lead paramedic working at San Antonio Memorial Hospital and the best friend of Jill Flint's Dr. Jordan Alexander."

== Cast ==
=== Main cast ===
- Eoin Macken as Dr. TC Callahan
- Jill Flint as Dr. Jordan Alexander
- Ken Leung as Dr. Topher Zia
- Brendan Fehr as Dr. Drew Alister
- Robert Bailey Jr. as Dr. Paul Cummings
- Jeananne Goossen as Dr. Krista Bell-Hart
- J.R. Lemon as ER Nurse Kenny Fournette
- Freddy Rodriguez as Dr. Michael Ragosa

=== Recurring cast ===
- Esodie Geiger as Nurse Molly Ramos
- Alma Sisnero as Nurse Diaz
- Catharine Pilafas as Nurse Bardocz
- Luke Macfarlane as Rick Lincoln
- Adam Rodríguez as Dr. Joey Chavez
- Scott Wolf as Dr. Scott Clemmens
- Merle Dandridge as Gwen Gaskin

== Episodes ==
| No. overall | No. in season | Title | Directed by | Written by | Original release date | US viewers (millions) |
|---|---|---|---|---|---|---|
| 9 | 1 | "Recovery" | Eriq La Salle | Gabe Sachs & Jeff Judah | February 23, 2015 | 5.52 |
Weeks following TC's breakdown in the surgery room, he is placed on a suspension, but returns to the hospital after he and an old Army colleague find an injured young hiker. The Night Shift welcomes a new trauma surgeon, Dr. Joey Chavez (Adam Rodríguez). Topher returns to work following his life threatening injury. Ragosa also returns to work following brain cancer surgery, but he finds he can no longer tolerate his job as head of The Night Shift. Jordan needs Scott to put a man trapped by an elevator car on a heart bypass machine to get him safely to the hospital, but Doctor Clemmens initially is reluctant after TC's meltdown in the OR but after both TC and Jordan beg Doctor Clemmens to help, he finally agrees. and she gets Ragosa to sign off on it. When a hospital director confronts Ragosa about the expensive field procedure, Ragosa angrily resigns. He later tells Topher he wants to focus on going back to school to be a doctor. Also, Krista and Kenny have become an item, while TC and Jordan reconnect.
| 10 | 2 | "Back at the Ranch" | Timothy Busfield | Bridget Bedard & Dailyn Rodriguez | March 2, 2015 | 6.13 |
TC returns to the hospital following his brief suspension, then deals with a woman who was accidentally shot by her husband and was later pronounced dead upon arrival. Ragosa starts his new job as a physician's assistant, while Topher and Jordan butt heads for Ragosa's old job. Kenny helps a star high school football player deal with the fact that his injuries will likely mean he can't play contact sports anymore. Drew has complications with his relationship that involve trying to get the doctor to sign for Rick to get a prosthetic. Meanwhile, Krista and Joey seem to connect, much to Kenny's annoyance.
| 11 | 3 | "Eyes Look at Your Last" | Eriq La Salle | Zachary Lutsky | March 9, 2015 | 5.45 |
The Night Shift staff tend to victims of a multiple car pileup. One victim, a young pregnant woman, is distraught when she goes into labor, saying she promised her now-dead father she would get married before the baby's birth. This causes the team to try to locate her fiancee, who is serving in Afghanistan. Another victim, a 16-year-old girl who had just returned from marrying her boyfriend in Arkansas, is visited by her distraught father (D. B. Sweeney). The father is a war veteran who returned from a tour only to find himself being a single father after his wife left. TC tries to help the man deal with his issues when the daughter goes into a coma. Meanwhile, TC begins to get along with Scott while they tend to the girl, and Jordan appears to mend fences with Scott. Jordan later sees Scott kissing a female companion. Paul tries to come to terms with still being an ER doctor while his father has bigger plans for him. Later on, the young pregnant woman survives and is married to her fiancee via Skype. Elsewhere, Ragosa continues to struggle with the job change. After Drew scolds him for repeatedly missing important patient information by not reading charts, he decides to pull a prank on Ragosa that will teach him a lesson, but learns something he never knew.
| 12 | 4 | "Shock to the Heart" | David Boyd | Tawnya Bhattacharya & Ali Laventhol | March 16, 2015 | 5.36 |
The staff have a busy night ahead of them when a female college student comes to the ER and faints on the floor. Paul finds a tampon that the girl forgot was inside her, and he suspects Toxic Shock Syndrome. Tests also show semen on the tampon, leading the girl to believe she was drugged and raped at a recent frat party she attended. While dealing with that, they have a skydiver who landed on a bus, and while treating him, Topher informs them that the skydiver has signed a DNR, which the girlfriend has no knowledge of, leading them to believe that the jump the skydiver made was intentional. TC and Jordan tend to a Mexican mom and her children, whose husband/father came to the ER with a mysterious ailment. Soon, the mom and children also come down with illnesses that have different symptoms such as vomiting and collapsing on the floor. Ragosa acts as interpreter for the Spanish-speaking family, and later finds evidence in the father's truck that his family has been working on a farm that uses illegal pesticides. Later, Drew's boyfriend comes to the hospital to treat his ankle he sprained trying to change a light bulb and complains of pain in his prosthetic leg. Feeling depressed, he tells Drew he doesn't feel like the same person anymore, and suggests they break up.
| 13 | 5 | "Ghosts" | David Boyd | Tom Garrigus | March 23, 2015 | 5.44 |
The ER is put on lockdown when a patient comes in after being exposed to caesium-137 radiation at his welding job, which also puts Paul in danger as he made first contact with the patient. Jordan is being stalked by a former patient, a man she saved after he had tried to commit suicide. TC's sister-in-law, who has never gotten along with Jordan, comes to town. Chavez does an emergency open heart surgery to save a patient's life, with Krista's assistance. When the shift ends, Chavez says he is off-duty and not her boss at the moment, and the two kiss. Kenny witnesses the kiss and is despondent.
| 14 | 6 | "Fog of War" | Jason Priestley | Matthew V. Lewis | March 24, 2015 | 4.04 |
An extreme fog rolls through San Antonio. Returning from a training session, Jordan, TC and Paul discover a truck crashed down an embankment. They discover the truck was transferring human trafficking victims, some of whom have been injured in the crash. They are forced to think on their feet when the fog delays helicopter rescue. Meanwhile, back at the hospital, Krista and Chavez work to save a 12-year-old girl who was caught in a flash flood, while Drew and Topher attend to the girl's older brother who dove into the water after her. While treating the boy for hypothermia, Topher is plagued by memories of an Afghani man being waterboarded, whom he couldn't save.
| 15 | 7 | "Need to Know" | Jay Chandrasekhar | Gabe Fonseca | March 30, 2015 | 5.04 |
TC finds his sister-in-law unconscious after a fall down the stairs. Meanwhile, Jordan discovers that she is pregnant, but finds it difficult to tell TC due to them butting heads regarding his sister-in-law's drug addiction. Also, the team is called to a campsite where a child has fallen down a well, and his mother, who went down after him, may not be as okay as she first seems. Meanwhile, Topher consoles Drew, who is falling deeper into a depression, and using his own methods of trying to distract himself that are unhealthy and gets him punched by the boyfriend of one of the guys he slept with, and almost costs a patient that he misdiagnosed his life. Ragosa's daughter visits the hospital, and Kenny blows off Krista after seeing her kissing Chavez.
| 16 | 8 | "Best Laid Plans" | Tara Nicole Weyr | Dennis Saavedra Saldua | April 6, 2015 | 5.53 |
The hospital is put on high alert following a building explosion that sends numerous casualties to San Antiono Memorial. At the explosion site, Drew and TC meet a man who has helped several victims, though he is not a licensed paramedic. They find that the guy was an Army medic, like TC and Drew, but has not been able to get help from the VA to pursue a career back home. Paul's famous surgeon father (James McDaniel) visits the hospital and begins taking control, annoying Scott and several other workers. TC and Jordan grow closer as they make plans for the arrival of their new baby. At the end of the episode, Paul thanks his father for offering to get him into a surgical program at Johns Hopkins, but says he wants to stay in town and pursue a career in pediatrics.
| 17 | 9 | "Parenthood" | David Boyd | Dailyn Rodriguez | April 13, 2015 | 5.52 |
The shift starts off when Drew and Krista attend a veterans' gala for the promotion of Drew's Army friend, Javier. During the gala, a party goer shoots Javier's colonel, with a stray bullet striking Javier's wife. Both are rushed to San Antonio Memorial. Later on, it is revealed that Javier's wife has a brain hemorrhage caused by a condition that existed even before the shooting, and she requires emergency surgery. TC, Jordan and Topher treat a young female patient with an unknown psychological disorder that resulted in her striking her father and an arresting officer, while also hurting herself. The arresting officer wants to put the girl in either jail or an institution after she recovers. Topher and TC believe something physical may be causing the girl's psychosis, but have trouble diagnosing it. Elsewhere, Paul wants desperately to help a nine-year-old patient with cystic fibrosis when he has trouble breathing, but the medication is very expensive and not covered by the boy's Medicaid. Paul takes Kenny's ID badge to get the medication from a locked room, which puts Kenny's recent promotion in jeopardy. Elsewhere, Ragosa is reluctantly forced to put his daughter's quinceañera party on hold due to money troubles.
| 18 | 10 | "Aftermath" | Allison Liddi-Brown | Tawnya Bhattacharya & Ali Laventhol | April 20, 2015 | 5.37 |
Following his heroic actions at the veterans' gala, Drew's private life is put in the spotlight, leading to public backlash and a negative encounter with a patient during his shift. Having seen the story on the news, Rick returns to support Drew. He then tells Drew that he hopes that they can get back together, but only under the condition that they no longer hide their relationship in public. TC and Paul treat a woman that gets multiple seizures, while Ragosa and Topher treat a man with severe migraines. Elsewhere, Jordan and Krista are on the way to a conference when they witness a motorcycle accident miles away from the hospital and out of cell phone range. They treat the victim the best they can in the car before stopping at an animal hospital. This leads to Jordan having mixed feelings about TC's own love for his bike.
| 19 | 11 | "Hold On" | Timothy Busfield | Matthew V. Lewis | April 27, 2015 | 4.94 |
One of the hospital's own, Scott, is involved in a serious multiple car accident. Scott then springs into action back at the hospital and gets ready to perform surgery to save one of his victims, but the young man's father is angry at him and holds him back from doing it. The father finally relents and lets Scott operate, but Scott has to pass a tox screen first. TC and Jordan treat a patient (Timothy Busfield) that has mysterious mental issues, while trying to coax helpful information from his wife (Melissa Gilbert). Paul and Krista treat a teenage girl who took a dangerous amount of growth hormones to perform better at volleyball. Later on, Scott's surgery saves his patient's life, but he later finds out the victim is paralyzed. Kenny and Gwen work in the field and grow closer.
| 20 | 12 | "Moving On" | Eriq La Salle | Jon W. Fong | May 4, 2015 | 5.53 |
The night starts off when a mother rushes her boy to the ER because he has a fever. While Paul tends to the boy, the mother faints and Jordan soon discovers that the mother is under stress because of her husband. Gwen soon sees signs that the husband is abusing the mother, but the staff is slow to believe her. Gwen then tells Kenny and the others about her own experience of being in an abusive relationship. TC treats an ex-con (Wendell Pierce) who broke his ankle while working at a construction site, only to later discover that the patient has ALS. Topher makes contact with Ali, an Afghani man who once saved his life. Ali's health is declining, and Topher determines he must go back to Afghanistan to treat him. TC insists that he go with Topher to help, much to Jordan's dismay. Elsewhere, Ragosa, Drew, and Krista make a bet on who will get the weirdest patient case that night.
| 21 | 13 | "Sunrise, Sunset" | Kevin Hooks | Zachary Lutsky & Tom Garrigus | May 11, 2015 | 4.92 |
The shift begins with Jordan announcing that Ragosa passed his exams and is now a doctor. Rick goes through a course to become an instructor in a train-the-trainer program for Army Rangers. Rick shares the news with Drew while getting fitted for a new prosthetic. Drew is excited for his boyfriend, only to get the bad news that the program is in South Carolina. The team travels to the scene of a car pile-up that turns deadly when there is an explosion, sending Paul to the hospital, with a burnt hand. Meanwhile, Ragosa and Paul discover their dead patient was actually shot, leading to the revelation that a sniper is at large, and Gwen's partner Sarah is shot after being lured out by the sniper. TC and Topher journey into enemy territory when Ali becomes to sick to travel, but become cornered by enemies. In the end, Paul's hand becomes infected, Topher and TC return to base with Ali, and while talking to Scott, Jordan has a stroke and goes into a coma.
| 22 | 14 | "Darkest Before Dawn" | Eriq La Salle | Milla Bell-Hart & Gabe Fonseca | May 18, 2015 | 5.20 |
As the sniper continues to terrorize San Antonio, Jordan has fallen comatose since a stroke. TC and Topher return stateside, with a worsening Ali, while Paul contemplates a risky surgery to save his hand. Meanwhile, Ragosa and Paul treat a homeless woman with a broken wrist, while Scott reveals to TC that Jordan's stroke was due to pregnancy complications. The sniper is brought into the hospital, but dies in surgery. Chavez returns to the hospital, and attempts to reconnect with Krista. News reports reveal there is a second sniper, who is eventually revealed to be Ragosa's patient. Krista backs out of a relationship with Chavez due to his Doctors Without Borders contract of 3 years. In the end, Paul decides to do the surgery on his hand, Rick reveals to Drew he took a different job training SWAT teams in San Antonio, and the two get married, and Ali gets the heart transplant. Jordan finally wakes up from her coma, only to discover she miscarried. When TC attempts to propose to Jordan, she tells him he doesn't have to.

== Broadcast ==
The Night Shift airs on Global TV in Canada, and on Universal Channel in Australia.
