= The Night Shift season 1 =

Season of television series

The Night Shift
- Season 1
- Season 1 DVD cover
- No. of episodes: 8

Release
- Original network: NBC
- Original release: May 27 – July 15, 2014

Season chronology
- Next → Season 2

The first season of the medical drama series The Night Shift aired between May 27, 2014, and July 15, 2014, on NBC in the United States. It was produced by Sachs/Judah Productions, and Sony Pictures Television with series creators Gabe Sachs and Jeff Judah serving as executive producers.

The series follows the overnight shift at San Antonio Medical Center, where three of the surgeons have a connection to the U.S. military. Dr. TC Callahan (Eoin Macken) is an ex-Army medic who initially exhibits PTSD-type symptoms, having watched his brother die right in front of him on the battlefield. He tends to go his own way at the hospital, frequently breaking rules and butting heads with his ex-girlfriend and newly appointed head of the night shift, Dr. Jordan Alexander (Jill Flint), and the hospital's administrator, Michael Ragosa (Freddy Rodriguez).

On October 8, 2012, NBC placed a pilot order, under the name After Hours, and ordered four additional scripts on April 18, 2013, under the final name The Night Shift. It was renewed for a second season on July 1, 2014, after airing only 5 episodes.

The first episode premiered to 7.67 million viewers, winning its timeslot. It garnered a 1.6/5 adults 18-49 rating, second only to America's Got Talent for the whole day.

== Production ==
The series first appeared as part of NBC development slate in October 2011, however, decided to not go forward with a pilot order. In August 2012, NBC decided to revisit the pilot script for the series, then known as The Last Stand. On October 8, 2012, NBC placed a pilot order, with the new name After Hours. The pilot was directed by Pierre Morel and written by Gabe Sachs and Jeff Judah.

On April 18, 2013, NBC ordered four additional scripts under a third and final title, The Night Shift. On May 10, 2013, NBC officially ordered The Night Shift to series. Production on season one of The Night Shift began in Albuquerque, New Mexico, in late August 2013, and ended filming in mid-November.

=== Casting ===
Casting announcements began in October 2012, with Eoin Macken first cast in the role of TC Callahan, a doctor who has recently returned from the Army, who constantly disagrees with his superiors and does things his own way. Freddy Rodriguez was the next actor cast in the series, in the role of Michael Ragosa, the hospital's administrator who originally wanted to be a doctor. Ken Leung and Jeananne Goossen were then added to the cast, with Leung cast in the role of Topher, an emergency room doctor who previously helped soldiers that were injured in battle. Goossen signed onto the role of Krista, a beautiful resident at the hospital. In early November, Robert Bailey Jr. joined the series as Paul Cummings, a young, but squeamish resident at the hospital. Jill Flint later signed onto the role of Jordan Alexander, the newly promoted Chief of the Night Shift, who once dated T.C. Daniella Alonso was the last actor cast in the series. Alonso will play the role of Dr. Landry de la Cruz, the lone psychiatrist working the night shift.

== Cast ==
=== Main cast ===
- Eoin Macken as Dr. TC Callahan
- Jill Flint as Dr. Jordan Alexander
- Ken Leung as Dr. Topher Zia
- Brendan Fehr as Dr. Drew Alister
- Daniella Alonso as Dr. Landry de la Cruz
- Robert Bailey Jr. as Dr. Paul Cummings
- Jeananne Goossen as Dr. Krista Bell-Hart
- J.R. Lemon as ER Nurse Kenny Fournette
- Freddy Rodriguez as Dr. Michael Ragosa

=== Recurring cast ===
- Esodie Geiger as Nurse Molly Ramos
- Alma Sisnero as Nurse Diaz
- Catharine Pilafas as Nurse Bardocz
- Luke Macfarlane as Rick Lincoln
- Scott Wolf as Dr. Scott Clemmens

== Episodes ==
No. overall	No. in season	Title	Directed by	Written by	Original release date	US viewers (millions)
1	1	"Pilot"	Pierre Morel	Gabe Sachs & Jeff Judah	May 27, 2014	7.67
TC Callahan, an ex-Army medic, works the night shift at a San Antonio hospital where several other former military personnel are on staff. Jordan Alexander, TC's one-time girlfriend, has just been promoted to shift leader. TC performs a field surgery to save a car accident victim, as astonished paramedics look on. At the hospital, TC wants to operate on the uninsured victim, but Michael Ragosa, the head of administration, wants the man transported elsewhere. A fight ensues and Ragosa later tells Jordan he plans to fire TC for his blatant disregard of hospital rules and procedures, but Jordan begs him to reconsider. Landry de la Cruz, the night shift psychologist, is shown to now be in a romantic relationship with TC, which they are hiding from Jordan. Meanwhile, Drew Alister, another surgeon who is ex-Army, is hiding a secret of his own.
2	2	"Second Chances"	Bill Johnson	Gabe Sachs & Jeff Judah	June 3, 2014	6.87
A dying sheriff’s deputy leaves TC facing giving him a heart transplant for the second time. Landry’s child abuse investigation produces a startling diagnosis.
3	3	"Hog Wild"	Sanford Bookstaver	Corey Evett & Matt Partney	June 10, 2014	6.70
While fighting in the tailgate area, Drew hurts his hand and tries to hide it from Jordan during his shift. Ragosa announces that the tailgate must be shut down, citing legal and safety reasons. TC and Paul must remove a man and a woman from a wild, drunken hog hunt via Medevac. The man has a severed left hand, which the team thinks they can reattach, but they must first remove it from the belly of a hog. Meanwhile, Topher helps a young girl save her single father. Later, while treating Drew's hand, Krista puts the moves on him, only to discover that he is gay.
4	4	"Grace Under Fire"	Kevin Dowling	Dailyn Rodriguez	June 17, 2014	6.25
It's Jordan's birthday, and she is disappointed to learn that her long-distance boyfriend, Scott (Scott Wolf), cannot make it into town to see her. Her day only worsens with the discovery that Landry is seeing TC. Meanwhile, Paul, wanting to watch Topher do a surgical procedure, dismisses a patient's stomach pain and fails to read her chart. Drew completes a training mission with his army reserve unit, one of whom expresses anti-gay beliefs. Drew keeps quiet with his secret, but the training - and conversation - is interrupted when their vehicle crashes after swerving to avoid a bull. Meanwhile, Ragosa accidentally takes ecstasy, thinking it was aspirin, and Topher plans to have a vasectomy.
5	5	"Storm Watch"	Eriq La Salle	Bridget Bedard	June 24, 2014	5.92
A violent storm hits San Antonio and causes a blackout. While Jordan and the team attempt to keep the hospital running smoothly, Landry's volatile father shows up in need of money to pay a debt. This is further complicated when he tells Landry that her mother is in danger if the debt goes unpaid. TC offers his support, but Landry - knowing he and Jordan have unresolved feelings - puts an end to their casual relationship. Later, TC apologises to Jordan regarding their history and the moment turns romantic. Meanwhile, Topher's wife (Kristy Wu) goes into labor during the storm, Drew receives good news from Rick, and Scott decides to take Ragosa up on his offer of a permanent position at the hospital.
6	6	"Coming Home"	David Boyd	Janet Lin	July 1, 2014	6.87
TC goes to Jordan's home to talk about their kiss. When they arrive at work together, Scott has questions for Jordan. Meanwhile, a bus carrying returning soldiers - one of whom is Drew's boyfriend Rick - is involved in a serious accident. When the injured soldiers arrive at the hospital, Scott quickly concludes that Rick will need a leg amputation. TC thinks there is another option and the two butt heads and get into a violent brawl, while Drew struggles with keeping his secret and still being there for Rick. Elsewhere, Kenny discovers Ragosa's internet dating profile, and Landry deals with a mentally unstable woman who is convinced she is carrying Matt Damon's baby.
7	7	"Blood Brothers"	Martha Coolidge	Zachary Lutsky	July 8, 2014	6.36
TC and Topher are dropped from a helicopter to a small plane crash site, where they find the pilot dead and the only other passenger suffering from a severely crushed chest. They also find two packets of illegal drugs. At the hospital, they are met by a DEA agent who wants to question the rescued passenger, but he may not be all he seems. Elsewhere, Paul takes care of a stripper who fell off a pole on the job and suffered a seemingly minor injury, and Krista treats a teenage girl (Daniella Bobadilla) who swallowed a fork.
8	8	"Save Me"	Vincent Misiano	Gabe Fonseca	July 15, 2014	6.05
Continuing on from the previous episode, the hostage situation has ended, but Topher - shot in the stomach - is in critical condition. While Jordan is forced to treat the shooter, TC suffers from flashbacks of his brother's death, prompted by the shooting, and spirals into a PTSD breakdown. Meanwhile, when Topher takes a turn for the worse, Scott fights to save him, and Ragosa reveals to Landry that his vision problems are caused by a tumor behind his eye.

== Broadcast ==
The Night Shift airs on Global TV in Canada, and garnered 985,000 viewers for its debut on May 27, 2014. It began airing in Australia on May 29, 2014, on Universal Channel.
