= The Night Shift season 3 =

Season of television series

The Night Shift
- Season 3
- No. of episodes: 13

Release
- Original network: NBC
- Original release: June 1 – August 31, 2016

Season chronology
- ← Previous; Season 2 Next → Season 4

The third season of the medical drama series The Night Shift debuted on June 1, 2016, and concluded on August 31, 2016, on NBC in the United States. It is produced by Sachs/Judah Productions, and Sony Pictures Television with series creators Gabe Sachs and Jeff Judah serving as executive producers. This season contained 13 episodes.

The series follows the overnight shift at San Antonio Medical Center, where three of the surgeons have a connection to the U.S. military. Dr. Thomas Charles "T.C." Callahan (Eoin Macken), an ex-army medic who often butts heads with his former girlfriend, Dr. Jordan Alexander (Jill Flint) and the hospital administrator, Dr. Topher Zia (Ken Leung), also an ex-army medic. Meanwhile, Dr. Alexander hires a new intern, Dr. Shannon Rivera (Tanaya Beatty), while Dr. Drew Alister (Brendan Fehr) has returned stateside after an incident overseas. Other doctors that are on the shift include surgeons Dr. Paul Cummings (Robert Bailey Jr.), who struggles to come out of his father's shadow while developing possible romantic feelings for Dr. Rivera, and Dr. Scott Clemmens, a recovering alcoholic and head of the surgery department.

== Cast ==
=== Main cast ===
- Eoin Macken as Dr. TC Callahan
- Jill Flint as Dr. Jordan Alexander
- Ken Leung as Dr. Topher Zia
- Brendan Fehr as Dr. Drew Alister
- Robert Bailey Jr. as Dr. Paul Cummings
- JR Lemon as ER Nurse Kenny Fournette
- Scott Wolf as Dr. Scott Clemmens
- Tanaya Beatty as Dr. Shannon Rivera

=== Recurring cast ===
- Esodie Geiger as Nurse Molly Ramos
- Alma Sisneros as Nurse Jocelyn Diaz
- Catharine Pilafas as Nurse Bardocz
- Luke Macfarlane as Rick Lincoln
- Merle Dandridge as Gwen Gaskin
- Jennifer Beals as Dr. Syd Jennings
- Sarah Jane Morris as Annie Callahan
- AnnaLynne McCord as Jessica Sanders
- Michael Cassidy as Sam
- Kyla Kenedy as Brianna
- Briana Marin as Nina Alvarez
- Mac Brandt as Mac Reily

=== Guest cast ===
- Lindsey Morgan as Kryztal
- Elizabeth Sung as Sumei Zia
- Lance Henriksen as Clive
- China Anne McClain as Lauren
- Carla Gallo as Hannah

== Production ==
"We went [to San Antonio] to scout so we could expand the look of the show; get more of [the] city in it ... Had the honor of a return visit to the Center For The Intrepid. Also amazing food. … Great locations here."

— Gabe Sachs to My San Antonio

Gabe Sachs revealed on Twitter that the first day of the writer's room for season 3 of The Night Shift was on November 17, 2015. Sachs said that shooting for the third season would commence in February, and later Jill Flint announced that filming would start on February 1, 2016. The sets began going up on December 15, 2015. Actors Robert Bailey Jr., Brendan Fehr, and Jill Flint arrived in Albuquerque, NM to begin filming on January 24, 2016. The first production meeting took place on January 27, 2016, and location scouting took place the day before. Production on the third season began on February 1, 2016 in Albuquerque, NM.

For the third consecutive season, the show will be filmed at Albuquerque Studios, and filming is expected to take place from February to June 2016. The tax incentives offered were cited as the main reason for filming in New Mexico, rather than in San Antonio. The show will employ about 130 New Mexico-based crew members, and approximately 500 New Mexico background talent. The first scene of the season filmed on February 2, 2016. The show filmed in a casino for part of one episode. Creator Gabe Sachs has said that this season would be more San Antonio-centric than either of the previous seasons. The Pearl Brewery, a local brewery, would be where the characters hang out after work, as well as "little taco places." Also, the costume department purchased T-shirts from local San Antonio locales such as, "Hogwild Records" and "Tapes on Main Avenue," because Sachs thought that "it would be cool if characters wore them" on screen.

=== Casting ===
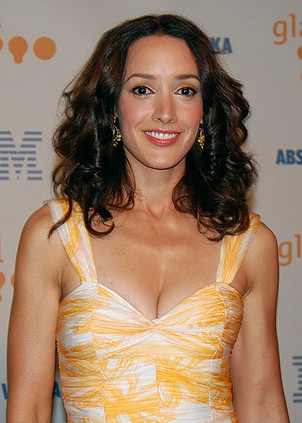
Jennifer Beals was cast as Doctor Syd Jennings.

On July 15, 2015, it was revealed that Scott Wolf who portrays Dr. Scott Clemmens had been promoted to series regular for the third season. On January 21, 2016, Deadline reported that Jennifer Beals had been cast as a recurring character named Doctor Syd Jennings. She will be introduced in the season 3 premiere as a Major in the Army who "has worked with the Culture Support Teams (CST) in conjunction with Ranger and Special Forces." On February 2, 2016, actress Tanaya Beatty was cast as a new series regular named Dr. Shannon Rivera, a recent med school graduate who impresses Dr. Alexander enough to recruit her as her intern. Melissa Gilbert and Sarah Jane Morris will both be returning for the third season.

Freddy Rodriguez, who portrays hospital administrator Michael Ragosa, revealed on Twitter that he would not be returning for the third season of The Night Shift, as he is starring in a new CBS drama pilot Bull. Jeananne Goossen who portrayed Krista Bell-Heart, is also not returning for the third season; she says that she split "amicably" from the show. On March 21, 2016, it was revealed that 90210 alum AnnaLynne McCord had been cast as a recurring character named Jessica Sanders, "a striking and driven pharamaceutical rep who's always looking for a way to make a deal." She will first appear in the fifth episode of the season, and in at least 3 additional episodes. Lindsey Morgan will appear in a guest role as Kryztal, "a high-strung bride whose injury in a wedding-day accident reveals a deeper and more complicated medical problem."

== Episodes ==
No. overall	No. in season	Title	Directed by	Written by	Original release date	US viewers (millions)
23	1	"The Times They Are A-Changin'"	Timothy Busfield	Gabe Sachs & Jeff Judah	June 1, 2016	4.81
Following Jordan's loss of her baby, she and TC have broken up but are still working together. Jordan recruits one of her colleagues, Shannon Rivera (Tanaya Beatty), to join the night shift, and Shannon makes an unusual first impression with the staff. Meanwhile, Drew is sent overseas to Afghanistan along with colleague Syd Jennings (guest star Jennifer Beals), where they are forced to tend to a 15-year old patient who is pregnant and whose husband is a high-ranking member of the Afghani army. Elsewhere, TC, Topher, and Scott tend to a female car accident victim, only to realize when the woman's husband arrives that they left her young son behind at the scene. Also, Gwen updates Kenny on her law school applications, and later learns the closest she got to acceptance was being put on a wait list at Georgetown.
24	2	"The Thing with Feathers"	Timothy Busfield	Tom Garrigus	June 8, 2016	4.18
Following a fight between Drew and the Afghani leader, the leader is accidentally shot in the shoulder by Drew, putting him in a tough spot. Despite the problem, Drew and Syd are able to help the young mom, her baby, and her brother get away from the leader. The consequences to this causes Drew to get sent home early while Syd, who was looking forward to her daughter's 13th birthday in two weeks, has to stay on tour an additional three months, due to a shortage of personal working there. TC and Scott deal with the car accident victim from the previous episode while simultaneously trying to save her son. They later determine the boy needs a bone marrow transfusion, but he is adopted and the parents claim they don't know the birth mother, which sounds fishy to TC. His suspicions are soon confirmed, as the boy was actually kidnapped by the couple. Desperate to have a child, they stole him from his birth parents at a mall. Elsewhere, Shannon helps Jordan move on from TC, Topher tries to renew his commitment to get fit again, and Gwen learns she moved off the wait list at Georgetown when another candidate drops out. To Kenny's dismay, she has to leave the next morning.
25	3	"The Way Back"	Tara Nicole Weyr	Janet Lin	June 15, 2016	4.47
Drew returns from Afghanistan and deals with the aftermath. Meanwhile, Jordan and the team deal with a newly-married couple whose wedding is ruined by the bride's alcoholic father. Drew treats the father, an Iraq War veteran who served multiple tours, and tries to get the daughter, Kryztal (Lindsey Morgan), to understand the root of her dad's problems. Topher and TC invite Topher's overbearing mother Sumei (Elizabeth Sung) to a casino. After they treat an elderly man named Clive (Lance Henriksen) who collapses while playing craps, Topher works to understand why his mother is so critical of him. Meanwhile, Paul comes up with a diagnosis for Kryztal that helps him finally earn the respect of both his subordinates and his fellow doctors.
26	4	"Three-Two-One"	Oz Scott	Zachary Lutsky	June 22, 2016	4.30
Amid protests over a court case involving a white police officer who shot an African American, riots erupt causing TC and Paul to be sent to the scene to treat any wounded. They arrive to find an officer and an African American perp named Shawn both shot and in critical condition. They can only put one on the first helicopter, and TC makes a call to send the officer, angering Paul who has to try and keep Shawn alive at the scene. At the hospital, Jordan treats Officer Benedict, the policeman at the center of the court case. Kenny has already made up his mind about Benedict's guilt, while Jordan hears the man out when he says he only shot because his own life was threatened. Shannon and Drew deal with the contaminated people (after officers are forced to use tear gas); after Drew leaves, Shannon is stuck with a 10-year-old separated from his mother. Jordan also finds a tumor in Benedict that she has to treat immediately to save his life. Drew and TC treat the officer brought back from the riot scene, but cannot save him. The bullet TC removes from the man's body, however, shows the fatal shot came from the gun of the man's partner, not Shawn's gun. Soon after, Benedict is being escorted out of the hospital when a protester on the street shoots him in the head, killing him.
27	5	"Get Busy Livin'"	Dailyn Rodriguez	Gabe Fonseca	June 29, 2016	4.46
As TC and Paul treat an injured person at a college party, a young co-ed falls from a fourth floor balcony to the pavement. Critically injured, the young woman tells her roommate as she is being wheeled into surgery that she was trying to kill herself. Scott learns that the hospital is on the short list to receive cutting-edge heart valve technology, but pharmaceutical rep Jessica Sanders (AnnaLynne McCord) holds the keys to their winning the program. TC angrily confronts Sanders when he learns an acne medication her company makes, and which the co-ed was taking, has "suicidal thoughts" as one of its side effects. The two later reconcile, with Jessica admitting the hospital was going to get the heart valve program anyway, and she was trying to use the situation to make a big sale. Elsewhere, Annie and Scott bond over their issues with substance abuse, while Jordan decides to finally spend the night with Sam.
28	6	"Hot in the City"	Darnell Martin	Nicole Rubio	June 29, 2016	4.46
The opening reveals TC sleeping with Jessica, Jordan waking up with Sam, Kenny sleeping with Nurse Jocelyn (Alma Sisneros), and Scott and Annie making out in a car. At the hospital, the air conditioning goes out on one of the hottest days of the year. Shannon and Jordan attend a local wrestling event, only to wind up bringing patrons back to the hospital after a fight breaks out. A young man who befriended Jordan at the event is injured, but his treatment reveals something worse. The ring girl has an injury to her spine that may cause paralysis, but Drew performs a successful surgery using a technique he learned on the battlefield. TC treats a competitive runner who collapsed from the heat. Her tests reveal possible meningitis, but it turns out she has an entirely different condition. Jordan later confronts Scott, saying it's not a good idea for him to date Annie, while Jordan herself decides to break up with Sam when he starts to get too serious.
29	7	"By Dawn's Early Light"	Louis Shaw Milito	Brian Anthony	July 6, 2016	5.74
Syd returns stateside, and is attending an outdoor concert with Drew and her daughter Riley (Jillian Estell), when banks of fireworks ignite early, causing chaos. A mother (Jessica Tuck) and her daughter Darika (Jackie R. Jacobson) are badly burned. TC and Topher arrive on the scene, and Topher authorizes Syd to assist in treating the mother and daughter back at the hospital. Soon after, Topher approaches a burning truck that contains fireworks and it explodes. Topher is badly hurt, but he refuses tests and insists on continuing to treat the wounded, over TC's and Jordan's objections. It is later discovered that Topher suffered a concussion. At the hospital, Scott and Syd treat the mother's burns. Impressed with Syd's techniques, Scott offers her a job, and Syd says she'll think about it. Paul and Shannon treat a street artist with a mysterious ailment, and in doing so, the two doctors finally find some common ground. Scott explains his attraction to Annie in a conversation with Jordan, asking that Jordan stay out of it. Kenny and Nurse Jocelyn consider going on a real date instead of just sleeping together. Syd learns that her ex-husband is moving to Washington, D.C. with his new wife and, to avoid a custody battle and stay close to Riley, Syd decides she will also move to D.C.
30	8	"All In"	Tara Nicole Weyr	Milla Bell-Hart	July 13, 2016	6.28
Drew and Shannon rescue a woman and her foster daughter, Brianna (Kyla Kenedy), from a car crash. As she is wheeled into surgery, the woman reveals she wants to adopt Brianna. While Drew tries to calm the scared Brianna, the team can't save the mom. At Shannon's request, Paul pretends the mom is "dying" but still alive, so Brianna can say goodbye. Shannon reveals to Nina (Briana Marin), the social worker assigned to Brianna's case, that she herself was a foster child. Topher and TC treat Topher's mother Sumei when she arrives with a life-threatening condition. Coincidentally, Clive, the man who collapsed at the casino (S3, Ep3), is also back in the hospital. TC finds that Clive's nitro patch is missing and, following a hunch, he finds it stuck to Sumei's back, revealing she and Clive were engaged in sexual activity. Jordan and Scott treat Dylan (Josh Fadem), who is having a rare reaction to a kidney stone. Scott wants to break up the stone with an ultrasound device, but the software malfunctions. Jordan notices the machine is made by Jessica Sanders' company, causing her to have to call TC's girlfriend to fix the problem and save Dylan. Meanwhile, throughout the night, everyone keeps congratulating Kenny, but he doesn't know why. Jocelyn finally reveals Kenny was elected head of the nurses' union at the hospital, a job he doesn't want. As the shift ends, Nina asks Kenny out "for coffee sometime", and hands him a card in full view of Jocelyn. Kenny doesn't accept, but he doesn't refuse, either. In the parking lot, Shannon thanks Paul for helping with the Brianna situation, then kisses him hard, and the two fall into the back seat of a car.
31	9	"Unexpected"	Marisol Adler	Janet Lin	July 27, 2016	5.32
A female patient is wheeled in to the ER as she complains about leaving her backpack behind, TC takes her in. She goes back out moments later to look for her backpack, which a fill-in nurse does not realize is right under his foot, so he goes after her with it. Kenny's young soccer-playing friend Lauren (China Anne McClain), in the ER for possible pneumonia, steps outside when a bomb goes off right outside the front doors. She is critically injured by the blast, and the fill-in nurse is killed. As the SWAT team clears the perimeter, TC's patient is located in the parking lot sitting in a pickup truck. She is shot when stepping out after a brisk move, and assisted by TC who asks why she brought the bomb, and she answers with "you deserve it." Shannon confesses to Jordan that she slept with Paul and now things are awkward between them, but they find themselves tasked with removing glass from Jordan's patient, and find out the man has anthrax. Realizing the anthrax was in the bomb, the hospital is shut down, decontaminated and everybody is treated with antibiotics. During Lauren's treatment, Kenny and Scott find out she has lung cancer, which would have gone undiscovered had she not been wounded. Jordan and TC remove bullets from the patient who brought the bomb, and Jordan remembers she was a former patient. As the two talk, the woman says Jordan saved her life after her husband and child were killed by a drunk driver. Claiming Jordan should have just let her die, she pulls her chest tube out, killing herself. Drew continues to help Brianna, his young patient with cystic fibrosis, only to find out she needs a lung transplant.
32	10	"Between a Rock and a Hard Place"	Jeff Judah	Tom Garrigus & Zachary Lutsky	August 3, 2016	5.00
TC and Paul arrive at the site of a quarry accident, where they pronounce one of the workers, a seventeen year old male, brain dead. Another teenager asks TC for help with his friend, who is falling down a sinkhole. TC saves him, using unconventional methods to get rock out of the kid's throat. Paul sends a blood sample to the hospital to see if the deceased man can give his lungs to Brianna. Drew tells Brianna that he and Rick want to adopt her, and she is thrilled. Meanwhile, Scott and Jordan have to run dialysis for Malik, whom Scott paralyzed in a car accident last season, but Malik's dad refuses to let Scott work on the boy. The dad goes into cardiac arrest and the two have to operate on him immediately. Drew gets the labs back on the lungs and finds five of the six requirements match, however Paul informs him that the victim's mom refused the transplant. Paul later gets the mom to accept; however, because Brianna is not a perfect match, her transplant is aborted and the lungs are given to another candidate who has a better chance of survival. Scott and Malik's dad make up, after Jordan talks with all three and Malik just wants the fighting to stop. Topher finds out that Jessica Sanders is actually heading the transition team for Hobart, the insurance company that bought the hospital. She volunteers to help with the insurance papers and tries to get Topher interested in another job offer, knowing Hobart will want their own Chief of Surgery and that Topher will be the first one fired. TC realizes Jessica knew about the sale to Hobart and kept it from him, so he angrily ends his romance with her.
33	11	"Trust Issues"	Oz Scott	Dailyn Rodriguez	August 3, 2016	5.00
TC and Drew land in jail after a bar fight. Jordan and Shannon's double date ends in disaster when Jordan's date falls through a glass door, and is unconscious. While Jordan tends to her date, his wife shows up and a deeper secret is revealed. Topher enlists Shannon to help him with a patient whose condition is claimed to be psychological. Annie begins to work at the hospital, and later confronts Scott when Jordan reveals she and Scott recently kissed. Kenny and Jocelyn break up, and Kenny begins to see Nina, Brianna's social worker. The hospital attempts to contact Drew after Brianna gets another chance at a lung transplant. With time running out to get Brianna into surgery, Paul has to ease her fears. The hospital finally contacts Drew, and Kenny sends Jessica to bail out Drew and TC. Nina is totally blown away by Drew being in jail, and considers not accepting the adoption. Syd returns to sign her release papers and meet Brianna. Topher and Shannon find out their patient's condition is due to a kissing bug reaction, and is therefore physiological. Jessica attempts to regain TC's trust, while Drew arrives at the hospital late. Brianna wakes up to Drew, Syd, and Rick, with her new lungs working great. Topher tells the hospital staff what is really going on with the sale of the hospital and the future of the ER. Syd tries to recruit people to go with her on an assignment at the Turkish border. TC decides some time away might do him some good, so he accepts.
34	12	"Emergent"	Timothy Busfield	Brian Anthony & Gabe Fonseca	August 24, 2016	5.52
Kenny reveals to Topher that some pain medication has been stolen, and everyone except Scott points fingers at Annie. Paul and Shannon butt heads over how to treat a patient who comes in with internal burns. Jordan and Scott deal with a man who caught his hand in a bear trap, and a piece of the trap ends up in his lung. Topher's old Army friend Mac comes in and asks Topher to sign off on a physical exam requirement so he can return to active duty, but Topher insists on doing the exam. TC and Syd get caught in a typhus outbreak at the Syria-Turkey border when more people flood into their refugee camp. Nina informs Drew that his adoption plans for Brianna are put on hold when Brianna's birth father, who didn't even know he had a daughter until a few months ago, comes back into the picture. Kenny reveals the gym he owns has flooded and he asks Paul for a loan. Kenny then makes a phone call to a mysterious person who may be a loan shark. Mac returns later and asks if anyone would help him at the site of a fire, and Jordan and Scott volunteer. Annie checks TC's locker and finds his field jacket gone; it is later revealed Jordan is wearing TC's jacket and finds the missing pain pills in a pocket. Syd catches typhus after giving her pills to an older Kurdish woman. Mac, Jordan, and Scott get trapped after the fire quickly changes direction. Topher learns that the buyer he'd hoped would purchase the E.R. from Hobart has backed out, only to have Paul reveal his father is part of an organization that buys hospitals. A package containing needed typhus medication for TC and Syd is dropped by parachute, but it floats to the Turkey side of the border fence and the Turkish guards refuse to let TC retrieve it.
35	13	"Burned"	Tara Nicole Weyr	Tom Garrigus	August 31, 2016	5.43
Scott and Jordan get trapped in a rapidly intensifying wildfire and are forced to do surgery in a farm. Topher's friend Mac is with them and goes back into the blaze to save them. TC gets arrested at the Syria-Turkey border when he tries to get the crate of Cipro which floated to the Turkish side. Syd's typhus symptoms get worse. TC later makes a promise with a Turkish guard; in exchange for the supply, he says Syd can perform surgery on the man's lame child. Kenny waits on a loan from Paul, and tells a loan shark he should have his $5,000 soon. Jordan tells Scott that Annie stole the missing pain pills. Paul's father arrives, and the two get into a disagreement over treatment for a patient. Drew and Rick do a background check on Brianna's father, which reveals his ulterior motive. The two later get the father to drop the custody suit, allowing Drew and Rick take Brianna home. Scott escorts Annie to rehab over her initial protests. Paul's father buys the E.R. but fires Topher, saying Topher is too willing to give high-priced treatment to people who can't pay. This causes Paul and most of the remaining staff (except for Shannon) to resign in protest. Shannon says she cannot risk quitting at this stage of her career, and Paul says he understands. The two then confess their love for each other. Paul's father cuts off his son's financial support, causing Paul to ask Kenny to give back the $5,000 check. Kenny does so, then walks toward his loan shark and two other large, intimidating men. As TC and Syd prepare to go their separate ways, missiles strike their camp, leaving the two unconscious.

== Broadcast ==
The Night Shift airs on Global TV in Canada, and on Universal Channel in Australia. On September 23, 2015, Season 1 premiered in India on Colors Infinity, and in Korea, season 3 episodes will premiere right after their U.S. airing on Olleh TV. The show premiered in the United Kingdom on January 12, 2016, on Sky UK.
