= The Night Shift season 4 =

Season of television series

The Night Shift
- Season 4
- No. of episodes: 10

Release
- Original network: NBC
- Original release: June 22 – August 31, 2017

Season chronology
- ← Previous; Season 3

The fourth and final season of the medical drama series The Night Shift began on June 22, 2017, on NBC in the United States with a timeslot change from Wednesday at 10:00 PM to Thursday at 10:00 PM. It is produced by Sachs/Judah Productions, and Sony Pictures Television with series creators Gabe Sachs and Jeff Judah serving as executive producers. The season concluded on August 31, 2017, and contained 10 episodes.

The series follows the overnight shift at San Antonio Medical Center, where after briefly quitting, the staff adjusts without former administrator and close friend, Dr. Topher Zia. Head of the night shift, Dr. Jordan Alexander (Jill Flint), works out a deal with new hospital owner, renowned neurosurgeon Dr. Julian Cummings, to rehire most of the staff. Meanwhile, Dr. Drew Alister (Brendan Fehr), struggles to find a balance between work and his new role as a father, while Dr. TC Callahan (Eoin Macken) spends time overseas at the Turkey-Syria border dealing with the humanitarian crisis. Also, Dr. Shannon Rivera (Tanaya Beatty) and Dr. Paul Cummings (Robert Bailey Jr.) deal with their feelings for each other.

== Cast ==
=== Main cast ===
- Eoin Macken as Dr. TC Callahan
- Jill Flint as Dr. Jordan Alexander
- Brendan Fehr as Dr. Drew Alister
- Robert Bailey Jr. as Dr. Paul Cummings
- JR Lemon as ER Nurse Kenny Fournette
- Scott Wolf as Dr. Scott Clemmens
- Tanaya Beatty as Dr. Shannon Rivera

=== Recurring cast ===
- James McDaniel as Dr. Julian Cummings
- Mark Consuelos as Dr. Cain Diaz
- Mac Brandt as Mac Reily
- Luke Macfarlane as Rick Lincoln
- Rana Roy as Dr. Amira
- Erica Tazel as Dr. Bella Cummings

=== Guest star ===
- Jennifer Beals as Dr. Syd Jennings
- Sarah Jane Morris as Annie Callahan
- Wilmer Calderon as Boon
- Rob Estes as Colonel Parnell
- Kelli Berglund as Sofia

== Episodes ==
No. overall	No. in season	Title	Directed by	Written by	Original release date	US viewers (millions)
36	1	"Recoil"	Marisol Adler	Brian Anthony	June 22, 2017	3.59
After an explosion, TC finds himself in Syria. He meets a local doctor, Amira, and deals with finding Syd who has been kidnapped by the rebels. In San Antonio, Julian threatens to close off the E.R. due to its costs. Jordan and Drew narrowly rescue Mac from the mountain fire, and Jordan and Julian blackmail each other for his treatment. They finally reach a deal: all personnel will return to their jobs, with Jordan as head, and the hospital will work treating vets for the DOD to balance costs. Meanwhile, Paul deals with the fallout from he and Topher being fired by his father, Julian, and Kenny butts heads with Cain Diaz (Mark Consuelos), a new traveling nurse, when treating a patient who overdosed on PCP and swears he didn't take it. Cain is the only one who believes him, and turns out he was dosed by his neighbour.
37	2	"Off the Rails"	Oz Scott	Tom Garrigus	June 29, 2017	4.15
Following on from the last episode, Drew and Paul tend to a roller coaster accident and soon discover that one of the victims is pregnant, despite having gotten an abortion, while the other has taken cocaine. Drew bonds with the victim's mother, who is also a soldier. Meanwhile, TC continues his quest to save Syd, and Jordan tries to get along with Julian while also trying to get Paul reinstated. She finally tricks him into returning and he deals a truce with his father. After saving Syd, TC decides to stay in Syria to help. Shannon discovers that nurse Cain was a doctor in Mexico and Jordan, after being forced to fire him for overstepping his duties as a nurse, hires him as a resident doctor. Scott finds a way to keep Julian happy while returning the hospital to some kind of normalcy. Later on, Jordan receives shocking news about Topher: he and his daughter were killed in a car accident.
38	3	"Do No Harm"	Marisol Adler	Milla Bell-Hart	July 6, 2017	4.24
Everyone grieves the loss of Topher. TC goes to extreme measures when treating a Syrian child, butting heads with Amira in the process. Jordan and Cain go out to a mine accident, and Jordan adjusts to her professional relationship with him. Meanwhile, Drew, Scott and Paul struggle to treat a patient with multiple symptoms, who may lose a hand, until they finally discover the cause to be lead poisoning. Also, Scott receives a surprise visit from ex-girlfriend Annie (guest star Sarah Jane Morris), when she brings in a patient who used to be Scott's Alcoholics Anonymous sponsor, helping them make peace. After patching things up with Scott and Jordan, she goes on a hike, where she commits suicide by jumping off a bridge into a flowing creek with a hiking bag full of rocks strapped to her back.
39	4	"Control"	Oz Scott	Joe Hortua	July 13, 2017	4.41
Scott attempts to treat a young patient with a large facial tumor, but the patient's grandfather – a devout Jehovah's Witness – refuses to allow her to have surgery. She cuts herself to force the surgery, but in the OR things get complicated quickly, and only Scott's persistence saves her. Drew struggles with the demands of being a new parent while also dealing with a patient who provided false information. He turns out to be an actor working for a customer's service evaluation company, but he later helps Drew reconnect with his mother. Meanwhile, TC joins a rescue mission in Syria, with one soldier missing as a result of the information given by the mother of his previous patient; Jordan and Cain try to help a wounded veteran come to terms with posttraumatic stress disorder with Mac's help.
40	5	"Turbulence"	Timothy Busfield	Alan McElroy	July 20, 2017	4.23
While on a flight home with his mom and Rick (guest star Luke Macfarlane), Drew deals with a plane full of sick passengers and a pregnant woman needing an emergency C-section. Meanwhile, Jordan, Shannon, Paul and Kenny compete against the staff of other hospital shifts at a charity 'Ninja Warrior' challenge. Also, TC performs a dangerous surgery to remove a live bomb from a soldier.
41	6	"Family Matters"	Eoin Macken	Tom Garrigus	July 27, 2017	4.45
Kenny's career is put on the line when he participates in one of Drew's MMA classes and severely injures his spine. Mac defends the ex-soldier who caused the injury, while Drew digs deeper and finds out the truth about the ex-soldier's past. Jordan and Cain treat victims from a hotel fire, and Shannon bonds with one of the victims who has a mysterious past. Meanwhile, Paul's urologist sister, Dr. Bella Cummings, visits the hospital, and TC returns home from Syria to handle some of Topher's legal affairs.
42	7	"Keep the Faith"	Timothy Busfield	Brian Anthony	August 10, 2017	3.09
Following a protest at Mac's funeral, a fight breaks out outside and injures several veterans, sending them to San Antonio Memorial. TC, Scott and Drew disagree on how to treat a U.S. Senator who is also an Army Veteran. TC and Drew later discover that the Senator has not been entirely truthful. Meanwhile, Shannon and Paul deal with a patient struggling with PTSD and later, Jordan confronts TC about whether or not he is back for good. This episode - written and directed by, and guest starring real veterans - was dedicated to all the United States Armed Forces.
43	8	"R3B0OT"	Terrell Clegg	Tom Garrigus & Shannon Sommers	August 17, 2017	3.52
Chaos hits San Antonio Memorial when an expert criminal hacks into the hospital's computer system, shutting down the power, taking over computerized devices, and putting patients at risk while demanding a ransom. After receiving negative performance review comments from Jordan about her demeanor with patients, Shannon has to treat a returning patient whom she previously mouthed off to. Meanwhile, TC joins Rick on a ride-along, but is forced to think quickly on his feet when one of Rick's men is seriously wounded. Also, Paul is shocked to learn that his sister and Kenny are dating.
44	9	"Land of the Free"	Gabe Sachs	Francesca Butler	August 24, 2017	3.72
TC accompanies SWAT on a raid at an ICE detention center, where several of those detained have become ill. He later discovers that one detainee has murderous intentions and escapes within the hospital. Kenny asks Paul for his sister's hand in marriage after only one month of dating. Meanwhile, Jordan receives shocking news that Cain fled town without notice. Also, Scott tries to keep a high profile to impress Colonel Parnell (Rob Estes) in his bid to get a Combat Medical Training Program in San Antonio. TC and Syd are expected to attend the presentation but Syd can't make it, so TC calls in Dr. Amira.
45	10	"Resurgence"	Jeff Judah	Brian Anthony	August 31, 2017	3.08
Scott begins a new training program with military members that all of the doctors take part in. Shannon and Paul discover a young girl with a rare heart disorder. A shooting at a nearby college sends the staff into panic mode. Jordan and Amira get caught by an armed protester, but are saved by Rick. Drew, TC, and a recruit deal with a college professor who is shot in the leg and has another underlying condition. Scott's new training program angers Julian, and also makes Shannon and Paul question their spots at the hospital. Amira confides to Jordan that her treatment is failing, and she and TC are returning to Syria. During Jordan's toast to Kenny and Bella at their engagement party, it's revealed that Shannon returns to her hometown clinic, while Amira returns to Syria – with Paul instead of TC. Drew attends Army Ranger school with Rick's blessing. His spot in the combat training program is replaced by TC, who tells Jordan he is not ready to leave.

== Production ==
Production and filming for the fourth season began in April 2017.

=== Ken Leung's departure ===
On November 22, 2016, Ken Leung (who played Dr. Topher Zia) announced that he would not be returning the series after three seasons citing not to renew his contract and to pursue other career opportunities.

== Ratings ==
Viewership and ratings per episode of The Night Shift season 4
No.	Title	Air date	Rating/share (18–49)	Viewers (millions)	DVR (18–49)	DVR viewers (millions)	Total (18–49)	Total viewers (millions)
1	"Recoiled"	June 22, 2017	0.6/3	3.59	0.3	1.63	0.9	5.22
2	"Off The Rails"	June 29, 2017	0.7/3	4.15	—N/a	—N/a	—N/a	—N/a
3	"Do No Harm"	July 6, 2017	0.7/3	4.24	—N/a	—N/a	—N/a	—N/a
4	"Control"	July 13, 2017	0.7/3	4.41	0.4	1.67	1.1	6.08
5	"Turbulence"	July 20, 2017	0.7/3	4.23	0.4	1.69	1.1	5.86
6	"Family Matters"	July 27, 2017	0.8/4	4.45	—N/a	—N/a	—N/a	—N/a
7	"Keep the Faith"	August 10, 2017	0.5/2	3.09	0.4	1.72	0.9	4.87
8	"R3B0OT"	August 17, 2017	0.6/3	3.52	TBD	TBD	TBD	TBD
9	"Land of the Free"	August 24, 2017	0.7/3	3.72	TBD	TBD	TBD	TBD
10	"Resurgence"	August 31, 2017	0.6/3	3.08	TBD	TBD	TBD	TBD
