= Michael Guerin =

- Roswell character
- Brendan Fehr as Michael Guerin
- First appearance: "Pilot" (episode 1.01)
- Last appearance: "Graduation" (episode 3.18)
- Created by: Character; Melinda Metz; Developed for Television; Jason Katims
- Portrayed by: Brendan Fehr (1998 series); Michael Vlamis (2019 reboot)

In-universe information
- Full name: Michael Guerin
- Alias: Rath (previous life)
- Nickname: Mikey G, Spaceboy, Micky
- Species: Alien-human hybrid
- Gender: Male
- Family: Hank Whitmore (foster father; deceased); Charles Dupree (genetic template); Laurie Dupree (genetic granddaughter)
- Significant other: 1999 Maria DeLuca (girlfriend); 2019 Alex Manes (husband), Maria DeLuca (ex-girlfriend)
- Abilities: Molecular manipulation and combustion, energy blasts

Michael Guerin is a fictional character created by Melinda Metz for the young adults book series Roswell High and adapted by Jason Katims for the American science fiction television series Roswell (1998–2002). He was portrayed by actor Brendan Fehr in the television series. In the CW reboot, Roswell, New Mexico, he is played by Michael Vlamis.

== Fictional character summary ==
Michael an alien/human hybrid that is part of the Royal Four of Antar, and the clone of the former alien, Rath. In 1947, the ship he was on crashed in Roswell, New Mexico. Michael, along with Max and Isabel, came out of incubation pods in the form of 6-year-old human kids years later. The three of them are found wandering in the desert and Michael is sent to live with a foster father named Hank, who is a drunk and abusive man whereas Max and Isabel are adopted by the Evans family.

A section of people believed that maybe, if he was ruler, then Antar would have been a better world. However, this isn't really confirmed by other canon sources, and this theory came only from the voice of the character Courtney, who was a self-proclaimed "Michael-worshipper".

In the 1999 series, his on-again, off-again girlfriend is Maria DeLuca, but he's perpetually in love with her.

In Roswell New Mexico 2019, Michael fell in love with Alex Manes in his high-school days, had off-on relationship and married him at the end.

=== Characteristics ===
Michael is the rebel and outsider of the group, even more so than Max and Isabel, probably because he lives in a trailer park and suffers abuse from his alcoholic foster father, Hank. As a result, Michael comes close to flunking out of school despite his hidden brilliance and he trusts no one but Max and Isabel. Michael is the most cautious of the three and is ready to leave Roswell behind when he has the slightest suspicion that his secret is out. Max and Isabel constantly have to talk him into staying.

Although he, Max, and Isabel want to find the truth about their origin, he is the most obsessed with it. He has come to hate his life on Earth mainly because he didn't get a loving family like Max and Isabel did, and often acts in selfish and careless ways to achieve this goal. Michael is also the most emotional of the alien trio, and the one most likely to act on his feelings. Due to his insecurity and inability to control his emotions, Michael has the least amount of control over his powers, but eventually learns to somewhat control them as the series progresses and he learns to control his emotions. His tendency to act impulsively and to make rash decisions often infuriates Max, Isabel, and everybody else around him. He comes close to putting them all in danger. Even though he keeps up a "tough guy" attitude, deep down, Michael really cares for his friends. After the episode "285 south" he and Maria grow close and fall in love, developing an on/off relationship throughout the show's run. Michael also eventually comes to realize that Earth is his real home because of his love for Maria.

=== Powers and Abilities ===
In season one, Michael has the same molecular manipulation and telekinetic skills as the rest of the hybrids, but openly states he cannot control them as well as Max and Isabel can. He tends to make things explode when he loses control or gets angry; this could be seen as a form of molecular combustion, and occasionally is seen to cause irritation to certain other people, causing them to itch. In the first-season finale, he is taught to change his fingerprints into that of a dead agent and is shown firing energy blasts from his hands. This leads to friction with Max, as Michael sees himself as the "bad guy" and Max as the "good guy". He has displayed some potential for superhuman strength, as shown in the episode "285 South" when he throws Kyle across the room but, it is possible that he simply manipulated his musculature or enhanced his attack with telekinesis.

In season two, he is shown to have much greater control of his powers (namely in the form of the aforementioned energy blasts) but his unique power (such as Max's healing, Isabel's oneirokinesis, or Tess's mind-control) was never really revealed.

== Fictional biography ==
=== Season one ===
Michael is in the Crashdown Café with Max when Liz Parker is accidentally shot during an argument between two customers. Michael tries to stop Max from helping her. It is revealed later that Isabel, Max and Michael had made a pact: never to use their powers in public, as it is just too dangerous. Michael and Max make a quick exit from the café. Michael wants to leave Roswell as soon as he realizes that their cover has been blown, but is convinced to stay by the others.

Michael hardly attends school and has trouble sleeping when he hears from Liz about the possibility of a fourth alien having been in Roswell in 1959. He breaks into the sheriff's office to look for answers, but the files he needs had been taken by the FBI, so instead he finds a key, which gives him an image of a geodesic dome. He can't seem to get the image out of his head and goes to art class for the first time in a few months to draw it. From the James Atherton book Among Us, Michael finds the location of the Dome. Max and Isabel don't want to go with him and he can't convince them. So to get there, without having own transportation, he abducts Maria and her mother's car. During the ride with Maria, their relationship first starts to develop.

His feelings for Maria threaten to disrupt his carefully maintained alienation from everyone except Max and Isabel. These feelings for Maria scare him a great deal, and he simply doesn't know how to deal with them. Because of Michael's unhappy and uncertain childhood, he has not learned many of the niceties of human interpersonal behavior and also has built a shell around himself to protect him from being hurt. He is totally unskilled in relationships and his feelings for Maria are disturbing and frightening to him, so he wants to keep her at arms' length.

Michael and Maria's relationship becomes even closer when after Hank threatens Michael with a gun, he uses his powers to defend himself and leaves Hank's and ends up going to Maria's where she sees him standing out in the rain, staring at her through the window. After bringing him inside, Michael breaks down sobbing on Maria's bed and Maria just lays with him, comforting him. Hank disappeared after that incident and Michael was granted legal independence (Hank was killed by Nasedo, but Michael was unaware of this). Michael got a job as a cook at the Crashdown Café and an apartment and began to build a life on his own. He and Maria continued to grow even closer.

However, events soon conspire to push Maria and Michael apart. Tess arrives in town and Michael starts getting visions that he might be with Isabel - at one point they think she might even be pregnant with his child through some alien dream connection. Michael thinks for a time that Riverdog is Nasedo, and that Nasedo might be his father. When he meets the real Nasedo, it is quite a let down - nothing is as he imagined. Michael uses his powers to kill Agent Pierce, then feels he has become a bad person and a danger to Maria. He pushes her away - totally - because he loves her and wants to protect her from him, and also because of the mission he has to do for his alien people.

=== Season two ===
The second season finds Michael with new, non-spiky, longer hair and a motorbike. He is still not the ideal boyfriend or the most charming or tactful person. If anything, his anger and frustration have increased and he is annoyed by Max's sudden appointment as king and leader, and they argue frequently.

Michael comes to fully trust Sheriff Jim Valenti, and with his mission and finding out more about himself, he has overcome some of his anger and found new strength and new focus.

Michael and Isabel have rejected any thought of a relationship with each other. Maria and Michael continue to bicker and be close, but he initially stands firm on his resolve not to continue his romantic relationship with her.

The battle with the Skins heats up and Michael is not sure he is ready, or that he will be strong enough. The new waitress at the Crashdown, Courtney, comes on to him outrageously, amusing Michael and making Maria very jealous and annoyed. Michael is not interested in Courtney at all, but they become closer when he finds out she is an alien - a 'good' Skin and on his side. In a very touching gesture, in the episode "Harvest" Michael saves Courtney's 'husk' (her new human body being grown to replace her current shedding old one) before they destroy the Skins' headquarters in Arizona. Unfortunately, she dies to protect them soon afterward while trying keep the secret of the Granilith from falling into the hands of Nicholas, leader of the 'bad' Skins.

Michael has the unsettling experience of meeting his 'dupe' Rath, who is ten times more uncouth than Michael ever could be. The totally unbelieving and cynical Michael discovers some faith during Christmas when he helps Max heal sick children and Isabel helps him out and manages to get Maria a Christmas gift she loves.

Michael and Maria go on a mission in mid-season two to take Michael's "sort-of sister", Laurie, to reclaim her home, which is being unrighteously occupied by her aunt and uncle, and to protect her from alien threats along the way. The two are faced with huge danger, in which Michael gets shot in the shoulder. However, he manages to save the day and thanks to Maria, Laurie gets her home back.

During their journey to Las Vegas, there seems to be the beginning of a thaw in Michael's resolve to keep Maria at arms' length. His love for her grows and Michael decides to let Maria "see him" in the final episode by allowing her to see into his mind and the two spend the night together. When Michael finds out that he is going back to his home planet, he realizes he has already a home on earth. He realizes his heart is with Maria and decides to stay.

=== Season three ===
Michael now has longish, shoulder length hair, and still has his dual-sport motorcycle. Because he found a home on earth, he's willing to make an effort. So he starts attending school more and finds himself an extra part-time job as a security guard to be better for Maria, and to earn more money to pay for their dates.

For the first time in his life, he has a group of male friends, which causes Maria to be jealous, as they do something she is unable to do: to make Michael laugh. After insisting that he spend more time with her, which causes him to sneak around behind Maria's back, she realizes that having friends is important to him and she tells him she loves him.

Michael becomes jealous of Billy (Maria's old flame and music partner), causing his powers to go out of control, particularly when he sees Billy and Maria singing together. He believes that Billy still has feelings for Maria, which she strongly denies. His suspicions are proved correct when Billy kisses Maria, and although she does not reciprocate his feelings, it causes her to break up with Michael, on the grounds that although she loves him, she doesn't want the "alien chaos" that comes with him. The breakup leaves Michael hurt and confused. He attempts to win her back, rather than giving her space, when he volunteers as Santa at the same time that she volunteers as an elf. She confesses that she misses him and kisses him, but they are interrupted by a kid. She then holds her resolve and tells him that she doesn't want to be right back where they were.

At New Years, the gang is in a search for a legendary party. Michael gets drunk when he sees Maria flirting with other men. He doesn't feel well because alcohol is extra bad for an alien. However, when he hears her complaining to Liz, he tells her that he's fine and to go on without him, which sparks Maria's emotions. Liz takes care of him and promises never to tell Maria Michael let her go although he was sick.

When Maria is discovered by talent scouts, the first person she wants to tell is Michael. As a result, the two sleep together again. Michael thinks this is because they are getting back together, whereas Maria just thought it was a capper to a great night. When she confesses this to Michael, she hurts him once again.

Later on someone kills Michael's friend, Monk, at the Meta-Chem Corporation where they worked together. He finds that someone at Meta-Chem is tracking him and most likely they discovered that he's an alien and they killed Monk for this reason. With Valenti's help, Michael tries to discover the truth but someone kidnaps Valenti. Max, Michael and Isabel go to Meta-Chem in order to free him. Max is the one who finds him and he discovers that someone at Meta-Chem, led by their leader Meris, was tracking Michael because they thought that he was the healer alien. Max gets in trouble, dies and survives after a resurrection. Between Max's death and resurrection, Michael gets the royal seal of Antar and becomes the king and leader. Michael can't handle this change and he starts to act recklessly. His temper gets out of control. He even throws Maria (who came back from New-York) out of his car after he angrily tells her that he stayed on the planet for her and she showed her appreciation by dumping him. Michael becomes dangerous and the group tries to find a solution. Eventually, Max takes the seal from him and returns to be the rightful king again even if he never liked this role. Michael finally understands how Max was right about being the king and how it's not a funny game to play.

At the end it is discovered that Michael, Isabel, Max and Liz are in danger and must leave Roswell. Before Michael leaves, he finally tells Maria that he has loved her since day one when he stole her car, and that he always knew she was the girl for him. With that he rides off, leaving Maria at the side of the road. When Michael comes back to save Max at the graduation, Maria announces that she is coming with them and tells Michael that this is her choice and that whatever happens, the two of them are in it together.

== Brendan Fehr about his character Michael Guerin ==
During the show, Brendan Fehr was interviewed several times about his character Michael Guerin. Here you can find some quotes of comments Brendan Fehr made during those interviews.

"Even though he doesn't want it to happen, Michael is kind of becoming a little more human in terms of dealing with relationships. It might not be during the conversation itself; it might be once the conversation is concluded where he kind of realizes that he blew it. In a way, that kind of shows that he knows he should have dealt with it differently and he grows from that. Before, he would have walked away from a situation and just not cared. Now he's showing a little bit of emotion that he knows he screwed up and all that."

— Brendan Fehr, from "Roswell: Brendan Fehr" by Edward Gross

From the same interview:

"The character's evolution over the season hasn't really surprised me,' he continues. 'I've been excited about what the writers have written for him, but it wasn't really surprising. I figured that was the only way he could go, which was to become a little bit lighter. Once in a while I kind of like it that he thinks he's got a place in life, that this is his journey and he's going to follow that journey, no questions asked. He's going to question everything else and defy all authority. I kind of like that, because even when he doesn't want to do something, I figured he would go against his heart and do what he felt he was meant to do. In one sense it's admirable, but in another it's kind of ignorant and stupid. I kind of like that loyalty on his part, but that's slowly going to be broken down with the relationship with Maria and Max and Isabel, which will force him to kind of embrace the human side of life more. That's going to be the real ultimate struggle for him. I don't think you can ride the fence on that one; you're going to have to fully embrace your alienhood or kind of go the other way, and I don't think, mentally for the health of the character, that he can just stay with his alienhood. Overall, I think a choice will have to be made and that's what he'll struggle with."

— Brendan Fehr, from "Roswell: Brendan Fehr" by Edward Gross

This bit was found on Brendan Fehr's official website http://brendanfehr.com

"It's funny, I was looking back to the pilot and some of the early episodes and Michael was really lonely. You could really tell that he was on the outside, but he kind of fits in now. He's still the loose cannon in the sense that he's still got the temper and he's a little bit fiery, but he fits in a little more. That's due to the writing and that's due to me and the acting choices I made. He had to loosen up a little bit, but I miss the fact that he was really an outsider. I wanted to soften him up 'cause I thought he was too hard and, now that I've softened him up just a tad, I want to go back to that hard edge, so I'm playing around with him and I'm trying to just figure it all out."

— Brendan Fehr, from "interview" by Christina Radish

== Michael Vlamis about his character Michael Guerin ==
Michael Guerin is his first foray into television:

"Even though Vlamis didn't have a clear idea of how fans would respond, he and the cast on Roswell, New Mexico did have the clear goal, which Vlamis said was "to be as honest and truthful to the characters and the situation as possible."

— Michael Vlamis, interviewed by Janelle McCammack

From an interview in Cosmopolitan when asked about the explosive response to the Malex ship between characters Michael and Alex:

"Tyler told me you can expect stuff like this to happen. He's never played a role like Alex, but I think he knew. He let me know, "I think this is gonna mean a lot to a certain group of people." That was our goal. To affect people. To make people feel better about the situation they're in or give them an outlet to escape with our show and our relationship, specifically."

— Michael Vlamis, interviewed by Emily Tannenbaum
