= Brendan Fehr =

Canadian film and television actor

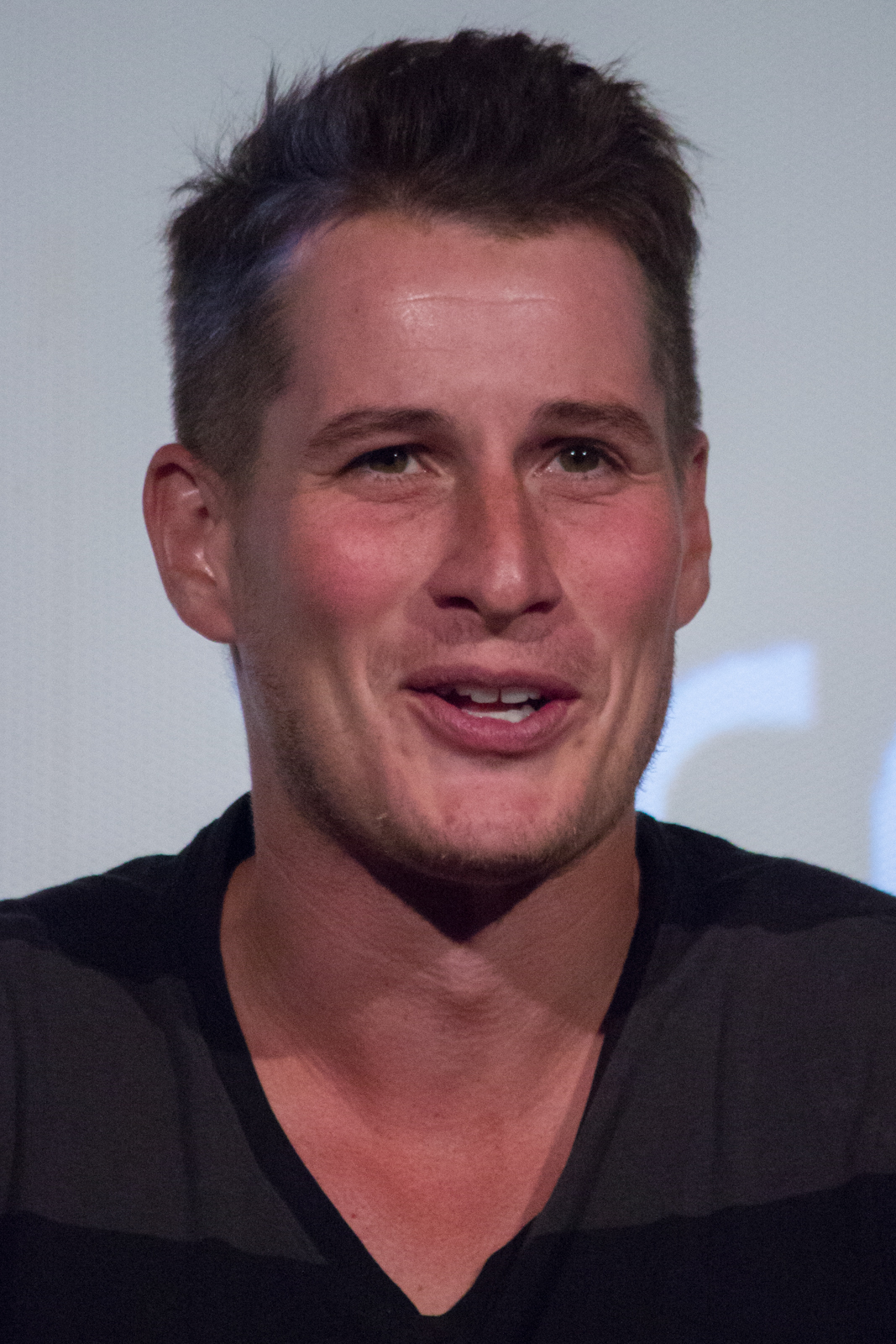
- Fehr at the ATX TV Festival 2014 for Roswell
- Born: Brendan Jacob Joel Fehr; October 29, 1977 (age 48); New Westminster, British Columbia, Canada
- Occupations: Actor; model
- Years active: 1997–present
- Spouse: Jennifer Rowley (m. 2006)
- Children: 3

Brendan Jacob Joel Fehr (born October 29, 1977) is a Canadian film and television actor, perhaps best known for portraying Michael Guerin in the WB television series Roswell, and for portraying lab tech Dan Cooper in CSI: Miami. In 2008, Fehr won a Gemini Award for Hottest Canadian Male TV Star at the 23rd Gemini Awards. Fehr also played Jared Booth in the Fox television series Bones. He has had numerous film roles.

== Early life ==
Brendan Fehr was born October 29, 1977, in New Westminster, British Columbia, to a mother who worked as a correctional case manager and a father who was a yacht manufacturer. Raised in a strict Mennonite household, he later moved to Winnipeg, Manitoba.

== Career ==
Fehr has modeled for Levi's, Calvin Klein, Emporio Armani, and DKNY Jeans, and his pictures appeared in magazines. Fehr broke into television in 1997 when he was cast in Breaker High. He enjoyed a regular role on the sci-fi TV series Roswell from 1999 to 2002. In 2001, Fehr starred in the U2 video "Stuck in a Moment You Can't Get Out Of". He plays a rookie football player named Paul Hewson (Bono's real name), who blows what would have been the game winning kick in an American football game as the ball hit the goal post. Fehr also appeared in Vanessa Carlton's video "Pretty Baby".

In 2008, Fehr starred as Jake Stanton in the ABC mini-series Samurai Girl, and had a recurring role as the character Jared Booth on Bones. In 2009 he had a recurring role as Cooper, a criminalist on CSI: Miami. In 2011, Fehr played a businessman in A Christmas Kiss and the navigator of a U.S. warship in the movie X-Men First Class. He also guest-starred in two episodes of Nikita.

In 2014, Fehr began playing the role of Dr. Drew Alister, an Army vet and surgeon at a San Antonio hospital, in the NBC drama The Night Shift. The show aired for four seasons, ending in 2017.

== Personal life ==
Fehr currently lives in Los Angeles, California and Albuquerque, New Mexico with his wife, Jennifer Rowley, whom he married in July 2006. The couple has three daughters born in 2008, 2011 and 2013.

== Filmography ==
=== Film ===
Year	Title	Role	Notes
1998	Hand	Hart	
1998	Disturbing Behavior	Brendan	
2000	Final Destination	George Waggner	
2000	Christina's House	Eddy Duncan	
2001	Kill Me Later	Billy	
2001	The Forsaken	Nick	
2002	Edge of Madness	Simon Herron	
2002	Long Shot	Danny	
2003	Biker Boyz	Stuntman	
2003	Nemesis Game	Dennis Reveni	
2004	Sugar	Butch	
2004	Childstar	Chip Metzger	
2005	The Long Weekend	Edward 'Ed' Waxman	
2006	Comeback Season	Paul	
2007	The Fifth Patient	Vince Callow	
2008	The Other Side of the Tracks	Josh Stevens	
2011	Fort McCoy	Sgt. Dominic Rossi	
2011	X-Men: First Class	Communications Officer	
2012	Silent Night	Deputy Kevin Jordan	
2013	13 Eerie	Daniel	
2013	Stranded	Lance	
2014	Roswell FM	Jay Rathbone	
2014	Zarra's Law	Gaetano	
2014	Guardians of the Galaxy	Rhomann Dey's Partner	
2014	House of Secrets	Tyler	
2014	The Stowaway	Barton	Short film
2016	The Last Transmission	Delta Sierra Juliet	Short film
2016	Only I...	Orion Smith	
2019	Daughter of the Wolf	David Hackl	
2019	Brotherhood	Robert Butcher	
2020	The Crimson Line	Timothy Gruel	Short film
2020	Wander	Nick Cassidy	
2022	The Commando	Sebastian	
2022	Grey Elephant	Garrett	
2023	The Best Man	Bradley	
2023	Captive	John	
2023	The Amityville Curse	Dr. Harrison Cole	
2023	The Alibi	Franco	Short film
2025	Kill Me Again	Charlie	

=== Television ===
Year	Title	Role	Notes
1997	Breaker High	Price Montague	Episode: "Tamara Has Two Faces"
1998	Every Mother's Worst Fear	Alan	TV movie
1998	Night Man	Eric	Episode: "It Came from Out of the Sky"
1998	Perfect Little Angels	Mitch Furress	TV movie
1998–1999	Millennium	Kevin Galbraith / Nick Carfagna	2 episodes
1999	The New Addams Family	Sam Sedgwick	Episode: "Wednesday's Crush"
1999	Our Guys: Outrage at Glen Ridge	Barry Bennett	TV movie
1999–2002	Roswell	Michael Guerin	Main cast (61 episodes)
2005–2008	CSI: Miami	Dan Cooper	35 episodes
2008	Samurai Girl	Jake Stanton	6 episodes
2008–2010	Bones	Jared Booth	5 episodes
2010	The Cutting Edge: Fire and Ice	James McKinsey	TV movie
2010	CSI: NY	Al Branson	Episode: "Tales from the Undercard"
2010	Ice Quake	Michael Webster	TV movie
2011	And Baby Will Fall	David Rose	TV movie
2011	A Christmas Kiss	Adam Hughes	TV movie
2011–2012	Nikita	Steven	2 episodes
2012	Adopting Terror	Kevin Anderson	TV movie
2013–2015	Longmire	Greg Collette	2 episodes
2014	House of Secrets	Tyler Jordan	TV movie
2014–2017	The Night Shift	Dr. Drew Alister	Main cast (45 episodes)
2016–2017	Better Call Saul	Captain Bauer	2 episodes
2016	Real Detective	Detective Mike Ciesynski	Episode: "Vengeance"
2017	Wynonna Earp	Ewan	4 episodes
2017	Wrapped Up in Christmas	Ryan McKee	TV movie
2018	Entertaining Christmas	John	TV movie
2021	Royally Wrapped for Christmas	Prince Aiden	TV movie
2021	Behind the Yellow House	Sheriff Brown	Episode: "What is Normal"
2022	Baron and Toluca	Jake Baron	2 episodes

== Awards and nominations ==
Saturn Award

- 2001: Nominated, Best Supporting Actor on Television – Roswell

Gemini Award

- 2008: Won, Hottest Canadian Male Star

Genie Award

- 2005: Nominated, Best Performance by an Actor in a Supporting Role – Sugar

Teen Choice Awards

- 2000: Nominated, Choice Sidekick – Roswell
- 2001: Nominated, Choice Sidekick – Roswell
