= Ogygia (Prison Break) =

- Prison Break episode
- Episode no.: Season 5 Episode 1
- Directed by: Nelson McCormick
- Written by: Paul Scheuring
- Production code: 1AZM01
- Original air date: April 4, 2017

Guest appearances
- Marina Benedict as A&W; Christian Michael Cooper as Mike Scofield; David Franco as Dr. Whitcombe; Akin Gazi as Omar; Steve Mouzakis as Van Gogh; Bobby Naderi as Mustapha; Primo Allon as FRP Release Officer; Leo Rano as Luca; Keith Dallas as Rental Agent Keith Blackman Dallas; Deborah Finkel as a Bystander; Lisa MacFadden as a Nurse

Episode chronology
← Previous "Free"	Next → "Kaniel Outis"
- Prison Break (season 5)

"Ogygia" is the 82nd episode of the American television series Prison Break and the first episode since 2009. The first episode of its fifth season which premiered on Fox in the United States on April 4, 2017.

This is also the first episode to be produced by Wentworth Miller and Dominic Purcell who star as brothers Michael and Lincoln.

== Plot ==
T-Bag is released from incarceration just as he receives a picture of Michael in a new prison. T-Bag shows it to Lincoln, who finds the hidden word "Ogygia", which is a prison in Sana'a, Yemen. Lincoln informs Sara, who has been raising her and Michael's son, Mike, along with her husband, Jacob. She refuses to believe the news. However, Lincoln determines to travel to Yemen to be certain, asking help from C-Note, who has converted to Islam. Sucre offers to accompany Lincoln, who takes C-Note instead. The mysterious mercenaries who have been following and harassing Lincoln and Sara send Lincoln and C-Note's pictures to their contacts in Sana'a, where the duo overpowers the attackers and meets a contact, who trades their visit to Ogygia for Lincoln's United States passport. Lincoln learns that Michael's fake identity is Kaniel Outis, a dangerous terrorist affiliated with ISIL. Michael ignores Lincoln, claiming not to know him. Meanwhile, T-Bag is contacted by a physician offering him a prosthetic hand as functional as a natural one. The procedure works, and T-Bag learns that an anonymous person known only as Outis (Greek for "Nobody") funded the operation and insisted on him being the patient.

== Reception ==
IGN gave "Ogygia" a 6.7/10.0 rating stating: "Strong chemistry from the series leads isn’t quite enough to make up for a nonsensical story as Prison Break returns to TV".

In another review, TV Fanatic gave Ogygia two stars out of five (2.0 / 5.0).

== Production ==
"Ogygia" is the first episode of Prison Break to air in eight years. It is the first episode of the revival series.

=== Writing ===
On August 7, 2015, it was announced that creator and executive producer Paul Scheuring would be writing the first episode as well as a style/tone bible for other writers to follow.
