= The Liar (Prison Break) =

- Prison Break episode
- Episode no.: Season 5 Episode 3
- Directed by: Maja Vrvilo
- Written by: Josh Goldin; Rachel Abramowitz
- Production code: 1AZM03
- Original air date: April 18, 2017

Guest appearances
- Marina Benedict as A&W; Christian Michael Cooper as Mike Scofield; Akin Gazi as Omar; Steve Mouzakis as Van Gogh; Bobby Naderi as Mustapha; Numan Acar as Abu Ramal; Michael Benyaer as Zakat; Waleed Zuaiter as Mohammad El Tunis

Episode chronology
← Previous "Kaniel Outis"	Next → "The Prisoner's Dilemma"
- Prison Break (season 5)

"The Liar" is the 84th episode of the American television series Prison Break and the third episode of its fifth season which premiered on Fox in the United States on April 18, 2017.

== Plot ==
Lincoln prepares for the escape by ordering forged passports. However, he and Sheba are caught by ISIL and Cyclops, who attempts to rape her until Lincoln frees himself and saves her. T-Bag runs into Sara, and tries to warn her about A&W and Van Gogh, two of Poseidon's henchmen, who may be following her trail. A&W and Van Gogh hack into her phone, later discovered by Sara, who deduces Kellerman's involvement. She asks T-Bag to investigate Kellerman. Cross, an inmate who refused to leave his brother, Muza, and participate in Michael's escape, warns Whip that Michael cannot be trusted. Michael obtains a gold watch from one of the guards, planting it on Ramal, so that he will be detained during the escape. Michael and Whip are revealed to have been working undercover for the CIA as Whip worries the line between Michael and Outis will be blurred. During the escape however, Ramal's party, Cross and Muza race to Michael's cell and are caught by the guards, leading to Muza's death and the recapture of Michael's team. Ramal vows to kill Michael in solitary while Michael uses the last remaining battery life on his cell phone to record a goodbye to Sara.

== Reception ==
IGN gave "The Liar" a 6.7/10.0 rating stating "Strong performances by Miller, Purcell, and Callies are keeping Prison Break afloat, but everything else needs work".
