= The Prisoner's Dilemma (Prison Break) =

- Prison Break episode
- Episode no.: Season 5 Episode 4
- Directed by: Guy Ferland
- Written by: Michael Horowitz
- Production code: 1AZM04
- Original air date: April 25, 2017

Guest appearances
- Marina Benedict as A&W; Christian Michael Cooper as Mike Scofield; Akin Gazi as Omar; Steve Mouzakis as Van Gogh; Bobby Naderi as Mustapha; Numan Acar as Abu Ramal; Michael Benyaer as Zakat; Waleed Zuaiter as Mohammad El Tunis

Episode chronology
← Previous "The Liar"	Next → "Contingency"
- Prison Break (season 5)

"The Prisoner's Dilemma" is the 85th episode of the American television series Prison Break and the fourth episode of its fifth season which premiered on Fox in the United States on April 25, 2017.

This episode marks the final appearance of Paul Adelstein (Paul Kellerman).

== Plot ==
ISIL continues advancing in Sana'a. Cross rallies the other prisoners to capture Ramal and use him as a bargaining chip. Michael convinces a reluctant Ramal to help them out as he is the one inside of the solitary cell with escape tools. Ramal, Michael, Ja and Whip are able to escape just as Cross and his followers break into solitary. Sid stabs Cross in the chest, joining Michael's party, which heads outside. They are all captured by ISIL. Ramal plans to behead Michael; but Lincoln intervenes and kills the jihadists while Whip kills Ramal. Michael and Lincoln share an emotional reunion as a news report on Ramal's death plays. Sid informs them that ISIL is now declaring war on them for Ramal's death. Meanwhile, T-Bag confronts Kellerman, who denies being Poseidon, an unknown rogue CIA agent criticizing the U.S. foreign policy. They are attacked by Poseidon operatives. T-Bag manages to escape; but Kellerman is killed by Van Gogh, who starts doubting Poseidon's cause. T-Bag pursues A&W and Van Gogh and takes photos of them meeting with Jacob.

== Production ==
The definition of the episodes title: "The Prisoner's Dilemma", is a paradox in decision analysis in which two individuals acting in their own self-interests do not produce the optimal outcome.

== Reception ==
IGN gave "The Prisoner's Dilemma" a 7.3/10 rating, the highest of the season at that point, stating; "Prison Break is always better when the brothers are together, but we’re not entirely convinced by the Poseidon reveal". Den of Geek gave it a positive review.
