= Aiden Turner =

British actor (born 1977)

Aiden j Turner
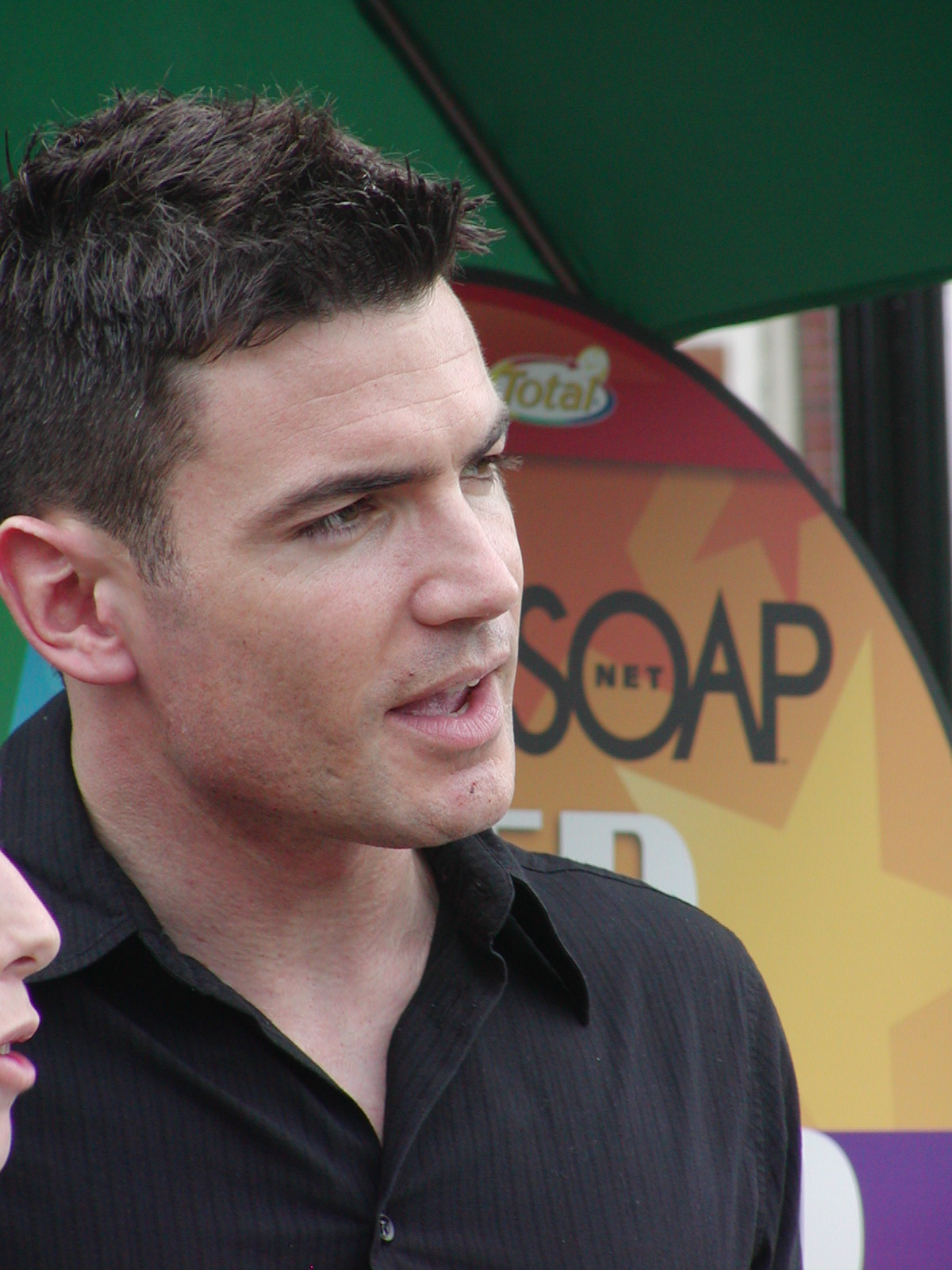
- Born: Aiden John Turner; 2 April 1977 (age 49); Welwyn Garden City, Hertfordshire, England
- Occupation: Actor
- Partner(s): Jessica Miller (2014–present)
- Children: 2

Aiden John Turner (born 2 April 1977) is a British actor and model, probably best known for his role as Aidan Devane on All My Children and Brad Montgomery in the Prime Time Television series If Loving You Is Wrong. He has also guest starred in many television series, including Agents of S.H.I.E.L.D., Single Ladies, NCIS Los Angeles, and Satisfaction. In 2022, Turner appeared opposite John Malkovich, Melissa Roxburgh and Martin Lawrence in a psychological thriller called Mindcage.

== Early years ==
Aiden Turner is from Stevenage, Hertfordshire, and attended local Catholic schools (St Joseph's, St Hugh's, and St Edmund's College, Ware).

== Career ==
Turner is known for his role as Aidan Devane on All My Children, which he played from 6 June 2002 until he left AMC on 21 December 2009. He was nominated for an Emmy in 2003 for Outstanding Younger Actor in All My Children. He also appeared in Geri Halliwell's Bag It Up music video. Turner left the role of Aidan Devane in May 2004, during which time the role was recast with actor Tom Archdeacon. Turner returned to the show a few months later and portrayed Devane until Turner left AMC on 21 December 2009.

On 1 March 2010, it was announced that Turner would be a celebrity contestant on Dancing with the Stars for the tenth season. He was partnered with Edyta Sliwinska who competed in her tenth season. The season premiered on 22 March 2010. Aiden was eliminated at the end of week 4 of Season 10.

After All My Children, Turner guest-starred on Single Ladies, NCIS: Los Angeles and Agents of S.H.I.E.L.D.. In 2014, he was cast in the Oprah Winfrey Network series If Loving You Is Wrong.

Along with acting Turner has found a successful career in voiceover, modeling and commercial work. He appeared in a CoverGirl commercial with Molly Sims. Aiden was also a model for Burberry, French Connection, Polo Ralph Lauren, among others, and has appeared in commercials for Diet Coke, Head & Shoulders, Mercedes-Benz, Dodge Dart, Clorox, and Chevrolet. He was the voice of Jaguar for many years. Recently, he starred in a horror movie, Hunting Souls, which was released on Apple TV and Amazon Prime, as well as the movie Mindcage, starring John Malkovich, Martin Lawrence, and Melissa Roxburgh.

== Personal life ==
Turner and girlfriend Jessica Miller have a son born in October 2015.

== Filmography ==
Year	Title	Role	Notes
1997	Crossroads	Iris Jamieson	Series regular
1999	Undressed		
2008	Manhattanites	Kyle Carpenter	
2002–2009	All My Children	Aidan Devane	Series regular
2011	Single Ladies	Sebastian Caliente	2 episodes
2012	Scruples	James	TV pilot
2012	In the Dark	Alex Smith	Television film
2013	The Perfect Boyfriend	Jacob	Television film
2013	NCIS: Los Angeles	Tom Norris	Episode: "Omni"
2014	Agents of S.H.I.E.L.D.	T. Vanchat	Episode: "The Magical Place"
2014	To Have and to Hold	Miles Cambridge	Feature film
2016	Satisfaction	Chip	1 Episode
2014–2020	If Loving You Is Wrong	Brad Montgomery	Series regular
2019	Charlie's Christmas Wish	John Frost	Feature film
2020	Hunting Souls	Mike	Feature film
2022	Mindcage	Dale	Feature film
2025	High Potential	Rhys	Guest role
