= Kaniel Outis =

- Prison Break episode
- Episode no.: Season 5 Episode 2
- Directed by: Maja Vrvilo
- Written by: Paul Scheuring
- Production code: 1AZM02
- Original air date: April 11, 2017

Guest appearances
- Marina Benedict as A&W; Christian Michael Cooper as Michael Schofield; David Franco as Dr. Whitcombe; Akin Gazi as Omar; avici as Van Gogh; Bobby Naderi as Mustapha; Numan Acar as Abu Ramal; Crystal Balint as Heather; Michael Benyaer as Zakat

Episode chronology
← Previous "Ogygia"	Next → "The Liar"
- Prison Break (season 5)

"Kaniel Outis" is the 83rd episode of the American television series Prison Break and the second episode of its fifth season which premiered on Fox in the United States on April 11, 2017.

== Plot ==
Lincoln receives a message from Michael asking them to find the 'Sheik of Light.' Sheba, the contact, agrees to help decode the message in exchange for money. Sara receives the video recording of Michael and meets up with Kellerman at the State Department. He deduces that Michael was the mastermind of changing his identity. Later, he sends Sara footage of Michael killing a CIA official. Michael acquires pills to give to his cellmate, Ja, who is suffering from withdrawals in exchange for a cell phone and credit card, using them to send a message to Sara. Lincoln's team discovers that Mohammad Al-Tunis, the 'Sheik of Light,' is a local electrical engineer trapped in an ISIL-controlled suburb with his daughter. They rescue the duo, and Mohammad is revealed to be the father of Sid, Michael's cellmate incarcerated for homosexuality. Mohammad gives Michael's team a signal to reveal that the escape plan is on. Sara receives Michael's message to get everyone to safety because "a storm is coming". The solitary inmates, including Abu Ramal, the local ISIL leader, are released into the general sector. Ramal and Michael are revealed to be close friends.

== Reception ==
IGN gave "Kaniel Outis" a 6.8/10.0 rating stating "Michael’s back, but so far, a twisty plot isn’t enough to carry the new Prison Break to the heights of the original."
