= Prison Break season 5 =

Season of television series

Prison Break
- Season 5
- DVD cover
- Starring: Wentworth Miller; Dominic Purcell; Sarah Wayne Callies; Paul Adelstein; Rockmond Dunbar; Robert Knepper; Amaury Nolasco; Mark Feuerstein; Inbar Lavi; Augustus Prew
- No. of episodes: 9

Release
- Original network: Fox
- Original release: April 4 – May 30, 2017

Season chronology
- ← Previous; Season 4

The fifth and final season of Prison Break (also known as Prison Break: Resurrection) is a limited event television series and a revival of the original series created by Paul Scheuring that aired on Fox from 2005 to 2009. The season is produced by 20th Century Fox Television in association with Adelstein Productions, Dawn Olmstead Productions, One Light Road Productions and Original Film. Paul Scheuring serves as showrunner, with himself, Marty Adelstein, Neal H. Moritz and Dawn Olmstead, Vaun Wilmott, Michael Horowitz and Nelson McCormick serving as executive producers. McCormick also serves as director. The season premiered on April 4, 2017, and concluded on May 30, 2017, consisting of 9 episodes.

Wentworth Miller and Dominic Purcell reprise their respective roles as Michael Scofield and Lincoln Burrows, while Sarah Wayne Callies, Amaury Nolasco, Paul Adelstein, Robert Knepper and Rockmond Dunbar also return from the original series. New cast additions include Mark Feuerstein, Inbar Lavi, Augustus Prew, Marina Benedict, Rick Yune and Steve Mouzakis. A pilot was ordered in August 2015 and the series was greenlit in January 2016. Production on the series began in April 2016 and filming took place in Vancouver and the Moroccan cities of Rabat, Casablanca, and Ouarzazate.

== Premise ==
Seven years after his apparent death, Michael Scofield resurfaces in the notorious Ogygia Prison in Sanaa, Yemen, under the name Kaniel Outis. As the country is engulfed by war, two of Michael's oldest friends, his brother Lincoln Burrows and fellow Fox River escapee C-Note, risk their lives by traveling to Yemen to bring Michael home. Back in the United States, Michael's wife Sara, now remarried, is hunted by agents of an operative known as Poseidon, the one responsible for Michael's disappearance.

== Cast ==
=== Main ===
- Wentworth Miller as Michael Scofield
- Dominic Purcell as Lincoln Burrows
- Sarah Wayne Callies as Sara Scofield
- Paul Adelstein as Paul Kellerman
- Rockmond Dunbar as Benjamin Miles "C-Note" Franklin
- Robert Knepper as Theodore "T-Bag" Bagwell
- Amaury Nolasco as Fernando Sucre
- Mark Feuerstein as Jacob Anton Ness
- Inbar Lavi as Sheba
- Augustus Prew as David "Whip" Martin

=== Recurring ===
- Rick Yune as Ja
- Marina Benedict as Emily Blake / A&W
- Steve Mouzakis as Van Gogh
- Amin El Gamal as Cyclops
- Kunal Sharma as Sid
- Numan Acar as Abu Ramal
- Curtis Lum as Agent Henry Kishida
- Crystal Balint as Heather
- Waleed Zuaiter as Mohammad El-Tunis
- TJ Ramini as Cross
- Akin Gazi as Omar
- Duncan Ollerenshaw as Blue Hawaii
- Faran Tahir as Jamil
- Leo Rano as Luca Abruzzi
- Michael Benyaer as Zakat
- Bobby Naderi as Mustapha
- Christian Michael Cooper as Mike Scofield

== Episodes ==
No. overall	No. in season	Title	Directed by	Written by	Original release date	Prod. code	U.S. viewers (millions)
82	1	"Ogygia"	Nelson McCormick	Paul Scheuring	April 4, 2017	1AZM01	3.83
T-Bag is released from prison just as he receives a photo of Michael in a new prison. T-Bag shows it to Lincoln, who finds the hidden word "Ogygia", which is a prison in Sana'a, Yemen. Lincoln informs Sara, who has been raising her and Michael's son, Mike, along with her new husband Jacob, about Ogygia. She refuses to believe the news. However, Lincoln decides to travel to Yemen, asking help from C-Note, who has converted to Islam. Sucre offers to accompany Lincoln, who takes C-Note instead. The mysterious mercenaries who have been following and harassing Lincoln and Sara send Lincoln and C-Note's photographs to their contacts in Sana'a, where the duo overpowers the attackers and meets a contact, who exchanges a visit to Ogygia for Lincoln's United States passport. Lincoln learns that Michael's fake identity is Kaniel Outis, a dangerous terrorist affiliated with ISIL. Michael ignores Lincoln, claiming not to know him. Meanwhile, T-Bag is contacted by a physician offering him a prosthetic hand. T-Bag learns that an anonymous person known only as Outis funded the operation and insisted on him being the patient.
83	2	"Kaniel Outis"	Maja Vrvilo	Paul Scheuring	April 11, 2017	1AZM02	3.18
Lincoln receives a coded message from Michael asking them to find the "Sheik of Light." Sheba, the contact, agrees to help decode the message in exchange for money. Sara receives the video recording of Michael and meets up with Kellerman at the State Department. He deduces that Michael was the mastermind behind changing his identity. Later, he sends Sara footage of Michael killing a CIA deputy director. Michael acquires pills to give to his cellmate, Ja, who is suffering from withdrawals in exchange for a cell phone and credit card, using them to send a message to Sara. Lincoln's team discovers that Mohammad El-Tunis, the Sheik, is a local electrical engineer trapped in an ISIL-controlled suburb with his daughter. They rescue the duo; and Mohammad is revealed to be the father of Sid, Michael's cellmate incarcerated for homosexuality. Mohammad gives Michael's team a signal to reveal that the escape plan is on. Sara receives Michael's message to get everyone to safety because "a storm is coming". The solitary inmates, including local ISIL leader Abu Ramal, are released into the general sector. Ramal and Michael are revealed to be friends.
84	3	"The Liar"	Maja Vrvilo	Josh Goldin & Rachel Abramowitz	April 18, 2017	1AZM03	2.44
Lincoln prepares for the escape by ordering forged passports. However, he and Sheba are caught by ISIL and Cyclops, who attempts to rape her until Lincoln frees himself and saves her. T-Bag runs into Sara and tries to warn her about A&W and Van Gogh, two of Poseidon's henchmen, who may be following her trail. A&W and Van Gogh hack into her phone, later discovered by Sara, who deduces Kellerman's involvement. She asks T-Bag to investigate Kellerman. Cross, an inmate who refused to leave his brother Muza, and participate in Michael's escape, warns Whip that Michael cannot be trusted. Michael obtains a gold watch from one of the guards, planting it on Ramal, so that he will be detained during the escape. Michael and Whip are revealed to have been working undercover for the CIA as Whip worries the line between Michael and Outis will be blurred. During the escape however, Ramal's party, Cross and Muza race to Michael's cell and are caught by the guards, leading to Muza's death and the recapture of Michael's team. Ramal vows to kill Michael in solitary while Michael uses the last remaining battery life on his cell phone to record a goodbye to Sara.
85	4	"The Prisoner's Dilemma"	Guy Ferland	Michael Horowitz	April 25, 2017	1AZM04	2.75
ISIL continues advancing in Sana'a. Cross rallies the other prisoners to capture Ramal and use him as a bargaining chip. Michael convinces a reluctant Ramal to help as he is the one inside the solitary cell with escape tools. Ramal, Michael, Ja and Whip are able to escape just as Cross and his followers break into solitary. Sid stabs Cross in the chest, joining Michael's party. They are all captured by ISIL. Ramal plans to behead Michael; but Lincoln intervenes and kills the jihadists while Whip kills Ramal. Michael and Lincoln share an emotional reunion as a news report on Ramal's death plays. Sid informs them that ISIL is now declaring war on them for Ramal's death. Meanwhile, T-Bag confronts Kellerman, who denies being Poseidon, a mysterious rogue CIA agent criticising U.S. foreign policy. They are attacked by Poseidon’s operatives. T-Bag manages to escape; but Kellerman is killed by Van Gogh, who starts doubting Poseidon's cause. T-Bag pursues A&W and Van Gogh and takes photos of them meeting with Jacob.
86	5	"Contingency"	Guy Ferland	Vaun Wilmott	May 2, 2017	1AZM05	2.35
Lincoln forces Michael to reveal the truth: Michael was contacted by Poseidon before his wedding with Sara; Poseidon revealed that Kellerman did not have any authority to exonerate Michael's team, offering legitimate exonerations in exchange for Michael faking his death, keeping the truth hidden from everyone and working for Poseidon. Michael's initial refusal led to Sara's arrest, after which Michael accepted Poseidon's deal. While Lincoln offers going to the airport and rendezvousing with C-Note's party, Michael decides to use the train station to leave Yemen. Cyclops works out Michael's plan and takes ISIL, intercepting Michael's party, who escape to a facility where Ja ambushes ISIL. They escape the building, but Sid is shot by Cyclops. Sid attacks Cyclops, but Cyclops stabs Sid, who handcuffs them together before he dies, leaving Cyclops handcuffed to his corpse, allowing the rest of the team to proceed to the airport. Meanwhile, C-Note's party arrives at the airport before ISIL attacks. C-Note and Sheba save a pilot, who agrees to fly them out of the country. They board a plane; but the pilot decides to fly before Michael's party arrives, which Lincoln approves of on the phone. C-Note's party takes off while Michael's is hunted by ISIL. In the meantime, T-Bag shows the photos to Sara, who confronts Jacob, who later attempts to prove his benevolence to her by having A&W and Van Gogh arrested.
87	6	"Phaecia"	Kevin Tancharoen	Michael Horowitz	May 9, 2017	1AZM06	2.37
Michael's party confronts Omar, who alerts ISIL; they overpower ISIL and force Omar's compliance, heading to Phaecia, a settlement in the desert capable of sending Michael's party abroad. A&W and Van Gogh are released on bail and convince an NSA insider to help track down Michael, whose party stops at a gas station, where Michael uses the internet to contact an unknown person in Portland, Maine, sending them a photo of the tattoos on his hands. Van Gogh alerts ISIL, who attack the gas station and kill Omar. Whip kills the ISIL operatives. Michael's party continues in the desert before learning about Cyclops chasing them. Michael takes one of the cars and lures Cyclops into a trap, where Michael blinds Cyclops' remaining eye. He is able to stab Michael with a poisoned blade. Ja helps the others find Phaecia, where they use fireworks to lead Michael to them, who falls unconscious after arriving. A&W and Van Gogh find Michael's contact, revealed to be an Elvis impersonator. Meanwhile, Agent Kishida replaces Kellerman, assigned to investigate his death.
88	7	"Wine Dark Sea"	Kevin Tancharoen	Vaun Wilmott	May 16, 2017	1AZM07	2.41
Ja decides to stay in Phaecia while the others leave on a boat to Crete, Greece. Lincoln calls Sara and tells her about Michael's condition. She informs Jacob and goes to Crete by plane. She reunites with Michael and heals him. He reveals that Jacob is Poseidon, having framed the former for the murder of the CIA official. Sara returns to the U.S. to secure Mike, whom she entrusts to her friend Heather; but they are captured by Jacob and his operatives. Michael reunites with Sucre on board the commercial ship upon which he is working. The captain learns about Michael and alerts the authorities. Navy SEALs are dispatched to kill Michael. Sucre formulates a plan to force the SEALs away, which causes an enraged Jacob to have a missile fired at the ship, which explodes just after Michael's party jumps overboard. Meanwhile, Kellerman's successor, Kishida, confronts A&W and Van Gogh for their clandestine operation, leading to the former's murder.
89	8	"Progeny"	Nelson McCormick	Michael Horowitz	May 23, 2017	1AZM08	1.90
Michael's party is rescued by a fishing boat that takes them to Marseille, France, where Michael contacts Sara, works out their situation, and decides to go to the US, using Lincoln's conflict with John Abruzzi's son Luca over a failed smuggling operation to their advantage. Michael and Lincoln enlist C-Note and Sheba's help in disposing of Luca and his gang, then convincing C-Note and later Sheba to leave the conflict. They proceed with the plan of taking down 21 Void, a cell operated by Poseidon, and rescuing Sara and Mike, culminating in a lake house in Michigan, where Michael reunites with Mike but realises that it was a trap set by Jacob, and A&W confronts them, with an unknown person getting shot. Lincoln is found by Luca outside the house and is shot. Meanwhile, Whip, whose true identity is David Martin, is sent to Chicago by Michael, meeting T-Bag, who is revealed to be his father. The analyst Theroux is revealed to be a 21 Void agent, and Van Gogh expresses disdain for Jacob's methods and vows to leave 21 Void when the job with Michael is done.
90	9	"Behind the Eyes"	Nelson McCormick	Paul Scheuring	May 30, 2017	1AZM09	2.30
Van Gogh is revealed to be the one shot by A&W, having become skeptical of Michael's involvement in Gaines' murder. Van Gogh gives up Mike's location to Sara before dying. As Jacob works to brainwash Mike, Michael gathers his allies, including Blue Hawaii (the Elvis impersonator who Michael contacted in Yemen), to bring down Jacob. A wounded Lincoln escapes the hospital and ensures Luca's arrest by the FBI. Michael enacts a plan where he lures Jacob and A&W to a warehouse to recreate Gaines' murder and prove Jacob's involvement. During the attempt, Whip is shot by A&W and dies before T-Bag kills her and is arrested. Michael succeeds in proving Jacob's involvement and both are arrested. At the same time, Lincoln and Sara rescue Mike and capture Theroux. With the evidence planted by Michael and Theroux's testimony, Michael is exonerated and his identity as Michael Scofield is restored. He refuses an offer to join the CIA and returns to a normal life with Sara and Mike. Jacob is sent to Fox River State Penitentiary, where he ends up with T-Bag as his cellmate, as requested by Michael. The other inmates cheer T-Bag on as he attacks Jacob.

== Production ==
=== Development ===
On January 12, 2015, at the 2015 Winter TCA Press Tour, Wentworth Miller and Dominic Purcell revealed the possibility that Fox was interested in bringing back Prison Break, with Miller stating: "We actually floated the idea to Fox very casually and they seemed very not casual about this interest. They seemed to think there was something there." Purcell concluded by adding, "It's something that Fox is, as Wentworth said, potentially excited about."

On January 17, 2015, Fox Television Group chairman and CEO Gary Newman made it clear that they would love to bring Prison Break back for another run, although Fox had nothing to report. Newman himself stated, "There's some speculation in the press at Prison Break and we've made it clear at the studio that we'd bring Prison Break back at the studio [...] It's the perfect event series. But at the moment, we have nothing else to report."

On June 2, 2015, it was reported that a limited series revival of Paul Scheuring's Prison Break was in development at Fox.

On August 6, 2015, Fox confirmed a 10-episode order for the revival. The limited series is a sequel to the original series, taking place several years later, and features Miller and Purcell reprising their roles as well as the return of other original characters. Fox Television Group chairman and CEO Dana Walden herself stated that Prison Break has performed particularly well internationally and on SVOD platforms such as Netflix. Walden added that: "a logical and believable explanation to why the characters are alive and still moving around the world [...]" Walden said. "The brothers and some of the iconic characters will be back, and it will address some questions that were set up at the end of the series for a new audience."

On January 15, 2016, Fox officially ordered the revival to series, with the episode order revised to nine episodes, though Fox declined to announce how many episodes the series will run. The original producing team of creator Paul Scheuring, Neal Moritz, Marty Adelstein and Dawn Olmstead were all confirmed as to return for the event series as executive producers and Scheuring writing and serving as showrunner and Miller and Purcell being producers of the season. Luca Tranchino served as production designer.

=== Writing ===
On August 7, 2015, it was announced that creator and executive producer Paul Scheuring would be writing the first episode as well as a style/tone bible for other writers to follow.

=== Casting ===
On January 15, 2016, stars Wentworth Miller and Dominic Purcell were confirmed to be reprising their roles as brothers Michael Scofield and Lincoln Burrows.

On February 22, 2016, it was reported that Mark Feuerstein would play Scott Ness (later changed to Jacob Ness), the husband of Dr. Sara Tancredi, a Professor of Economics (game theory) at Cornell who has been described as, "dubious of the government but still has a bit of fight in him when it comes to taking them on." Additionally, on February 22, 2016, it was confirmed that Sarah Wayne Callies was in talks to reprise her role in the follow-up along with Robert Knepper, Rockmond Dunbar and Amaury Nolasco, although there were no deals in place with any of them at that time.

On March 9, 2016, Augustus Prew, Rick Yune and Steve Mouzakis were cast for "heavily recurring roles". Prew plays "funny, crazy and pretty damn sharp" Whip; Yune plays Ja, who is described as a "Korean identity thief, who disheveled appearance belies his genius"; and Mouzakis plays Van Gogh, "a bad-ass nut-job". On March 9, 2016, Sarah Wayne Callies was confirmed to be returning as Sara Tancredi. On March 16, 2016, Amin El Gamal was cast in a recurring role, playing Cyclops.

On March 17, 2016, it was announced that original stars Robert Knepper, Amaury Nolasco and Rockmond Dunbar would be reprising their respective roles as T-Bag, Sucre and C-Note, respectively. On March 21, 2016, Paul Adelstein was confirmed to be reprising his role as Paul Kellerman. On March 21, 2016, Inbar Lavi, Marina Benedict and Kunal Sharma were cast in major recurring roles. Lavi plays Sheba, an operator/fixer/activist who becomes involved with Burrows. Benedict is A&W, "a crazed and fearless villainess who is unconcerned about her physical well-being but ruthless and efficient in completing her deadly goals", and Sharma plays Sid, a man in prison. On April 22, 2016, it was announced that Faran Tahir would play Jamil, whom Tahir describes as "a man who has an inner conflict which again is something I love experimenting with."

In July 2016, it was revealed that William Fichtner would not be reprising his role as Alexander Mahone. Robert Knepper told Digital Spy that "[writer] Paul Scheuring loves Bill Fichtner and I love Bill Fichtner. He's a brilliant actor – but Paul honestly said to me, 'I don't know what to do with that character'. He didn't want to just bring everybody back, so that the audience go, 'Oh, look, it's Bill Fichtner again!' – he honestly thought, 'I'm not sure where to do that in the plot.' So if someday there's another chapter of this, maybe then Bill will be back. But I think the characters that are there, each of our moments that we have, are key to the storytelling, which is how it should be."

=== Filming ===
Production on the season began on April 7, 2016, in Vancouver, once Miller and Purcell completed filming for Legends of Tomorrow. Filming concluded in Vancouver on July 11, 2016. On June 1, 2016, Dominic Purcell was almost killed on set in Morocco, after an iron bar used as a set piece had fallen onto his head, which caused a broken nose and a head injury. Purcell was immediately airlifted from Marrakesh to Casablanca for treatment where he recovered. Filming of the series was not substantially disrupted due to the accident.

=== Music ===
Composer Ramin Djawadi stated that he would definitely like to return and work on the new season of Prison Break, after learning of the news of the possible revival, to which further stated, "I literally just heard it, so it's news for me. It's very exciting because the show was such a good show but nobody has contacted me at this point." Djawadi later added, "Most likely, if my schedule allows - that show was very close to me. I loved all the people involved. I thought it was an incredible show. Absolutely." In June 2016, it was confirmed that Djawadi would return as composer for season five.

== Reception ==
=== Critical response ===
The revival season received a mixed response. On review aggregator Rotten Tomatoes, the season has an approval rating of 56% based on 34 reviews, with an average score of 6.14/10. The site's critical consensus reads, "Prison Break recaptures some of its old urgency in its return, but familiar faces and frenetic action aren't enough to make up for a plot that manages to bore while beggaring belief." On Metacritic, the season has a score of 48 out of 100, based on 18 critics, indicating "mixed or average" reviews.

=== Ratings ===
Viewership and ratings per episode of Prison Break season 5
No.	Title	Air date	Rating/share (18–49)	Viewers (millions)	DVR (18–49)	DVR viewers (millions)	Total (18–49)	Total viewers (millions)
1	"Ogygia"	April 4, 2017	1.5/5	3.83	0.8	1.86	2.3	5.68
2	"Kaniel Outis"	April 11, 2017	1.1/4	3.18	0.9	1.84	2.0	5.01
3	"The Liar"	April 18, 2017	0.9/3	2.44	0.8	1.76	1.7	4.20
4	"The Prisoner's Dilemma"	April 25, 2017	0.9/3	2.75	—N/a	—N/a	—N/a	—N/a
5	"Contingency"	May 2, 2017	0.8/3	2.35	0.7	1.51	1.5	3.86
6	"Phaecia"	May 9, 2017	0.9/3	2.37	0.6	1.33	1.5	3.70
7	"Wine Dark Sea"	May 16, 2017	0.9/4	2.41	0.7	1.41	1.6	3.81
8	"Progeny"	May 23, 2017	0.7/3	1.90	0.7	1.60	1.4	3.50
9	"Behind the Eyes"	May 30, 2017	0.9/3	2.30	0.7	1.54	1.6	3.83

== Home media release ==
The event series was released on Blu-ray and DVD on June 27, 2017. Special features include a behind-the-scenes featurette, "A Return Home: The Making of Prison Break Event Series".
