= Prison Break: The Final Break =

2009 television movie

- DVD cover
- Screenplay by: Nick Santora & Seth Hoffman (Part 1); Zack Estrin & Karyn Usher (Part 2)
- Story by: Christian Trokey (Part 1); Kalinda Vazquez (Part 2)
- Directed by: Brad Turner (Part 1); Kevin Hooks (Part 2)
- Starring: Dominic Purcell; Wentworth Miller; Amaury Nolasco; Robert Knepper; Jodi Lyn O'Keefe; Sarah Wayne Callies; William Fichtner
- Composer: Ramin Djawadi
- Original language: English

Production
- Running time: 89 minutes
- Production companies: Original Film; Adelstein/Parouse Productions; 20th Century Fox Television

Original release
- Release: May 27, 2009

Related
- "Killing Your Number"; "Ogygia"

Prison Break: The Final Break is a television film that is part of the Prison Break franchise. The movie was released on May 27, 2009. It serves as the initial conclusion to the series before the release of its fifth season. It explores the events that transpire between the fall of The Company and the subsequent revelation of Michael Scofield's (portrayed by Wentworth Miller) death. The film details the manipulated arrest and incarceration of Sara Tancredi (Sarah Wayne Callies) for the murder of Christina Scofield, the final escape plan which Michael devises for Sara, and the details surrounding Michael's death. It also reveals the ultimate fate of Gretchen Morgan (Jodi Lyn O'Keefe).

== Plot ==
Sara is arrested for the murder of Christina (Scofield) Hampton. She is held in the Miami-Dade State Penitentiary, where overcrowding necessitates that the female prison and jail inmates are housed in the same building. Prisoner Gretchen Morgan watches from a distance. Across the yard, Krantz and T-Bag are being held in the men's facility.

The General offers a $100,000 bounty for Sara's death. Sara is poisoned, but is saved by the prison doctor, who informs her that her baby will be taken away shortly after its birth.

Michael asks Warden Simms to protect Sara, but she refuses. Michael decides that he must break Sara out, enlisting Lincoln Burrows and Fernando Sucre's help. Gretchen sees Lincoln and Sucre scoping out the prison, and demands Sara include her in any escape.

Michael discovers a blind spot in the security cameras. Alexander Mahone, offered reinstatement with the FBI if he finds evidence incriminating Michael, offers to help Michael. FBI Agent Todd Wheatley breaks into Michael's apartment and sees the prison diagrams. When Michael returns, he says he was looking for weaknesses to report to Simms in the hopes that she grants him visitation.

Sara's attorney secures a court order allowing Michael to visit. Leaving the prison, he sees the cameras being adjusted to eliminate the blind spot.

Sara joins the "Family" of inmate Daddy, who gets her work in the motor pool, making Wife and other Family members suspicious.

Michael devises a new plan based on parachuting into the prison. Lincoln offer T-Bag $5,000 to help by setting off a fire alarm. T-Bag demands $100,000, suggesting they rob the bounty money from the General's agent, Joe Daniels. Lincoln and Sucre carry out the theft.

Gretchen kills a Family member who is attacking Sara. Gretchen again demands Sara include her in the escape because she wishes to see her daughter, Emily, and give her a gift. Daddy becomes infuriated when she hears what Sara and Gretchen have done.

It is revealed that Mahone has informed Wheatley about Michael's parachute plot. Michael continues to trust Mahone, giving him material to pass to Sara in the event of his death. Michael visits Sara and cryptically tells her the new plan; she must get to the chapel, which Michael has discovered has an emergency escape tunnel.

Just before the escape begins, Gretchen distracts a guard, and Sara confronts Daddy. Sara pushes Daddy into inmate Skittlez, instigating a larger altercation. Gretchen grabs the guard's keys, then hides in the kitchen with Sara.

Having been tipped off, Wheatley orders all lights shut off and positions armed officers near Michael's planned landing site. They shoot the parachutist, which turns out to be a dummy, while Michael sneaks out from under Wheatley's car.

Gretchen is spotted by guards, but she stalls them and covers Sara's presence, who makes it into the chapel. The guards take Gretchen away, and Sara retrieves the necklace that Gretchen made for Emily.

Michael reaches Sara, and they wait for T-Bag to get confirmation of the $100,000 and trip the fire alarm. Sucre reaches the money transfer store to find it closed; when T-Bag finds out that the money wasn't deposited, he reveals the plot to Simms. Wheatley responds by turning off the fire alarm and other systems that could cover escape noises.

Michael had predicted T-Bag's double-cross. With the alarms off, he burns through a locked door with a blowtorch. When the electronic lock on the next door stymies him, he instructs Sara to proceed as he goes elsewhere to short circuit the door. Sara refuses, but Michael emphasizes that this allows her to keep their baby. Michael is electrocuted while causing the short circuit. Sara escapes to a waiting Lincoln, Sucre, and Mahone. Mahone reveals he was part of Michael's true plan, and that Michael knew it required the deadly short circuit.

When Lincoln and Sara board a boat to the Dominican Republic, Sucre gives Sara the $100,000. Mahone gives Sara and Lincoln the material from Michael. On the boat, the two watch Michael's video, where he tells then that his terminal brain tumor had returned. He asks Lincoln to always be there for the child, and he asks Sara to watch out for Lincoln.

== Cast ==
=== Starring ===
- Dominic Purcell as Lincoln Burrows
- Wentworth Miller as Michael Scofield
- Amaury Nolasco as Fernando Sucre
- Robert Knepper as Theodore "T-Bag" Bagwell
- Jodi Lyn O'Keefe as Gretchen Morgan
- Sarah Wayne Callies as Sara Tancredi
- William Fichtner as Alexander Mahone

=== Guest starring ===
- Leon Russom as General Jonathan Krantz
- Chris Bruno as FBI Agent Todd Wheatley
- Barbara Eve Harris as FBI Agent Felicia Lang
- Kim Coates as Richard Sullins
- Aisha Hinds as Guard Cowler
- Lori Petty as "Daddy"
- David Starzyk as Blue Phillips
- Amy Aquino as Warden Alice Simms
- Dendrie Taylor as Guard
- Richmond Arquette as Attorney Joe Daniels
- Damien Leake as Detective Marlin
- Alicia Lagano as Agatha Warren
- Joseph Will as Doctor
- Sufe Bradshaw as Wife
- Dot Marie Jones as Skittlez
- Rainbow Borden as Seags
- Livia Trivino as Hucks
- Ian Patrick Williams as Bearded man
- Peggy Dunne as Guard

== Release ==
Prison Break: The Final Break was made available twelve days after the season four finale to wrap up the series. In the United States, the film was first released on DVD and Blu-ray on July 21, 2009. It aired on May 27 in the United Kingdom on Sky1.

== Reception ==
=== Critical response ===
Neville Naidoo of MovieWeb asserted that while Prison Break: The Final Break may not be as compelling as the original series, it remains a great film with a spirited performance by Sarah Wayne Callies. Samantha Jacobs of Looper stated that one of Prison Break: The Final Break's biggest wins is its return to the early-season style that made the show compelling. They found the action scenes enjoyable and the stakes high enough to intrigue viewers. However, Jacobs said that the film, which occurs midway through the series finale's time jump, is not a true epilogue or the end of the characters' stories. Although it provides additional content for loyal fans, they felt the series finale felt complete without it, making the film fun but not entirely necessary.

Cindy White of IGN rated Prison Break: The Final Break seven out of ten, noting that it marks a return to the show's original formula of intricate planning and suspenseful escapes. White found the two unaired episodes satisfying despite their standalone nature. However, the plot felt rushed despite being engaging, and the subplot involving Mahone's shifting loyalties lacked depth. While the "women-in-prison" clichés could have been explored further, White appreciated that the episodes offered a fitting conclusion to a series that, despite its later struggles, began with a strong, innovative premise. David Kobylanski of Collider gave Prison Break: The Final Break a score of three out of five. Kobylanski said it successfully adds depth to the series by bridging the gap between the end of the main story and the epilogue. They found that these two unaired episodes enhance the narrative with a gripping plot about Michael Scofield's mission to rescue Sara, offering a satisfying conclusion for fans. Despite initial doubts about its necessity, Kobylanski praised its release as a valuable addition, though the special features were minimal.

=== Home video sales ===
The film ranked among the top 10 TV DVD season sets for the week ending July 26. It finished at No. 8 on the Nielsen VideoScan First Alert chart. Prison Break: The Final Break has grossed $5,168,975 in domestic home video sales.
