= Theodore "T-Bag" Bagwell =

Character on American television series Prison Break

- Prison Break character
- First appearance: "Allen" (2005)
- Last appearance: "Behind The Eyes" (2017)
- Created by: Paul Scheuring
- Portrayed by: Robert Knepper; Michael Gohlke (young)
- Voiced by: Robert Knepper (video game)

In-universe information
- Aliases: T-Bag; Teddy; Dr. Marvin Gudat; Clyde May; Stumpy; Sam; Dr. Erik Stammel; Teodoro; Cole Pfeiffer; Charles Patoshik; Brett Benson (Breakout Kings); Henry Pope (Breakout Kings)
- Family: James Bagwell (second cousin); James Bagwell Jr. (second cousin once removed); Audrey Bagwell (mother); David "Whip" Martin (son)
- Significant others: Susan Hollander; Jason "Maytag" Buchanan; Carmelita "Sister Mary Francis"

Theodore "T-Bag" Bagwell is a fictional character from the American television series Prison Break. Played by Robert Knepper, he is part of the main group of characters in the series and is part of the Fox River Eight. After guest-starring in the series' second episode, "Allen", the actor became one of the regular cast members.

The character was introduced into the series as a fellow prisoner of the protagonist, Michael Scofield (Wentworth Miller), at Fox River State Penitentiary. As the leader of a white supremacist group, T-Bag is the most villainous member of the Fox River Eight. In the second season, the character's storyline veers from the main plot as a separate subplot. As the series progresses, more of the background story of the character is revealed. The character has appeared in A&E's Breakout Kings, portrayed by Knepper. A younger version of the character, played by Michael Gohlke, appeared in one episode via a flashback sequence in "Bad Blood".

== Characterisation ==
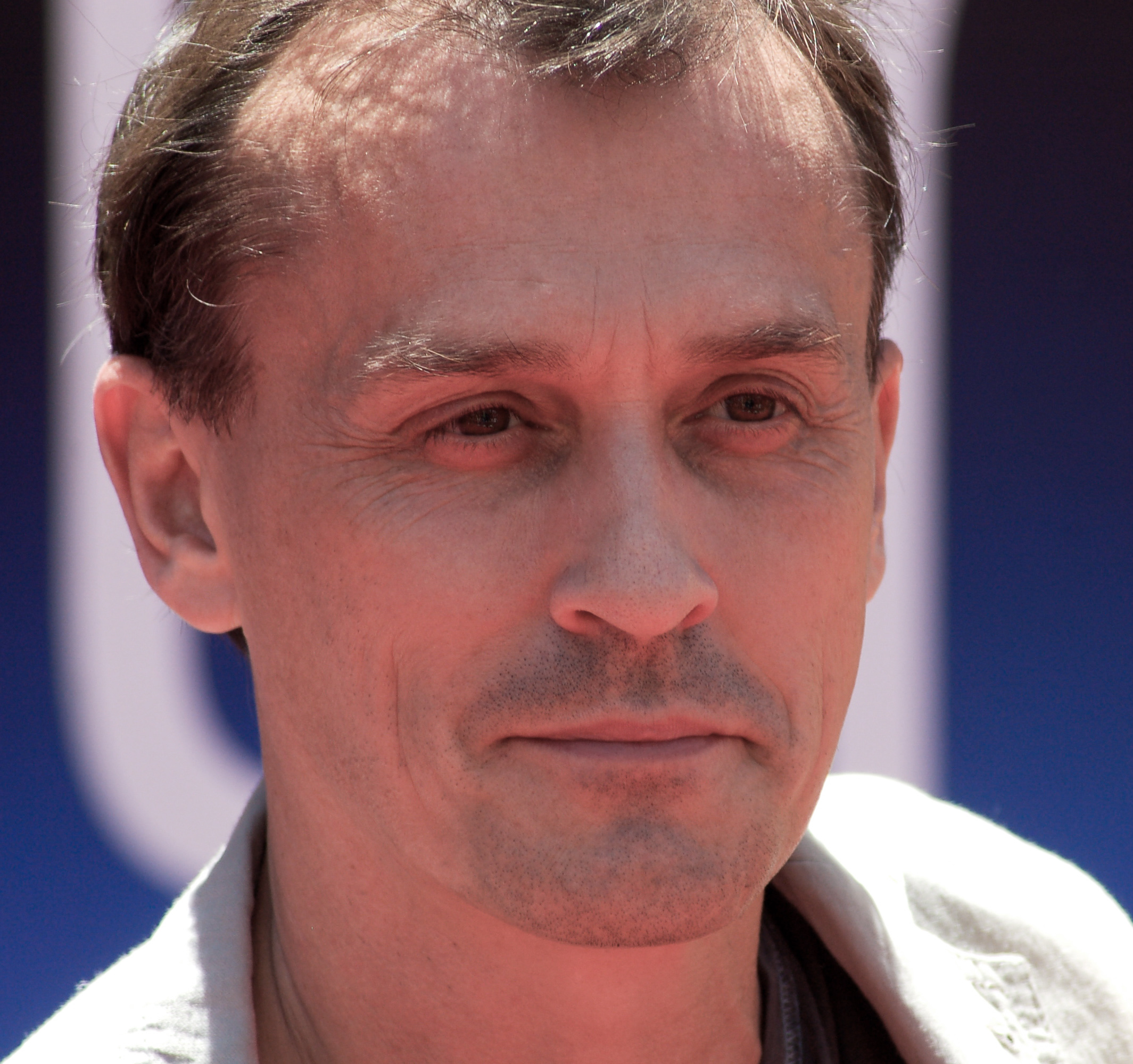
Robert Knepper portrayed Theodore.

Despite being despised by the other convicts for his heinous crimes and affiliation with the Alliance for Purity, T-Bag is quite eloquent and many women find him charismatic and charming. Knepper comments that, "T-Bag's not crazy. He knows exactly what he's doing. He's not going to make himself stupid." In a separate interview, Knepper says, "I never play him like a stereotypical racist or redneck. He's actually quite cunning and smart." He likens the character to "Truman Capote without a degree."

As an adult, T-Bag starts committing serious crimes, such as battery, assault, attempted murder, murder, rape, and kidnapping. It is also insinuated that he is a pedophile, and it is implied once in passing that he is also a necrophiliac. The character's sexual appetite ranges from in general, young men and women, adolescents, and children. The character once seduced a transgender woman within the prison at the behest of Sucre so as to obtain a pair of female undergarments necessary for a ruse; yet previously mocked the individual, stating 'I may be social, but that's the boundary line even I won't cross.' When asked about the character's sexuality, Knepper stated, "We're not passing judgment. We're not trying to get these people off the hook. T-Bag's not a homosexual. He's a raw animal. He'd [sleep with] anything."

Knepper said of fans of the series, "Around episode 6 or 7, I got so many letters from people saying, 'When I first started watching this show, I absolutely hated you and I wanted you dead. Now I still want you dead, but I'm starting to feel for you.' I think there's something in my eyes, a childlike thing in there. There's still an innocence. There's still a bit of hope."

During season four T-Bag starts showing disillusionment with his actions, even saying that he wishes that he could have been Cole Pfeiffer, respected salesman and person. He shows reluctance to undertake disturbing tasks. He shows emotion and is upset after receiving the news of Bellick's death. He does not want to take GATE hostage and reacts emotionally when Gretchen kills Gregory White, his employer and only true friend. He demonstrated authentic reluctance to kill Gretchen's family or the Bible Salesman/Company Agent. He eventually offers to even release him, at great risk to his personal freedom and lets Gretchen's family go. In the fall finale, T-Bag is the main party against Lincoln killing Gretchen, citing her being a mother as a reason, which can be seen as significant as she had tried to kill him not more than a few days earlier.

During press for the revival season, Knepper himself stated that he doesn't like talking about the heinous crimes for which T-Bag was initially imprisoned.

== Storylines ==
=== Season 1 ===
Theodore "T-Bag" Bagwell is the leader of the Aryan gang inside Fox River. A racist and a pedophile, he is detested by most other inmates, such as John Abruzzi (Peter Stormare) and Benjamin Miles "C-Note" Franklin (Rockmond Dunbar), but his status within the Alliance for Purity protects him from attacks. Upon the arrival of Michael Scofield (Wentworth Miller) at Fox River, Bagwell wants to ensnare him as his sex slave, but is unsuccessful. During a race riot in episode "Allen", his cellmate and lover is fatally wounded. Believing Scofield was responsible, Bagwell seeks revenge but is stopped by Abruzzi, who has his goons assault him, sending him to the infirmary after which the character is absent for two episodes. When he returns in the episode "Riots, Drills and the Devil", Bagwell instigates a full-scale riot, during which he accidentally learns of the escape attempt and threatens to tell the other inmates if Michael and the others do not include him; the others have no choice but to agree. At the end of the riot, Bagwell defies the orders of Michael and Abruzzi and murders a guard that could expose the escape. He later frames his friend and fellow Aryan gang member Trokey for the murder. Following this, Bagwell becomes a fully-fledged member of the escape team in the episode "The Old Head", blackmailing them to include him.

Bagwell is initially an endless source of friction on the escape team, testing the others' patience with racist taunts, and is a constant strain on Michael's conscience. Throughout the season, T-Bag is shown as having a sexual interest in other inmates, and coerces his new cellmate Seth into a sexual relationship. After Seth hangs himself, Bagwell moves on to harass newly arrived inmate Tweener, who had alienated himself among Fox River's prison population. Michael, who was feeling guilty about Seth's death, finally confronts Bagwell with a crowbar to the knee and tells him to leave Tweener alone. In the following episodes, friction continues to increase between Bagwell and the other members of the escape team. When the group discovers that they have one too many for a successful escape, Abruzzi gives Bagwell an ultimatum in the episode "Odd Man Out": back out of the escape or die. Bagwell also learns that his cousin James Bagwell and his son had been killed and is deeply upset. Knowing that Abruzzi was behind it, Bagwell seeks revenge, and slashes Abruzzi's throat with a razor blade in a failed attempt to kill him. Bagwell is among six inmates included in the first unsuccessful escape attempt in the episode "End of the Tunnel".

Bagwell is more loyal to the team in the season's later episodes, contributing to keep the escape tunnel hidden and engaging in reluctant relations with a transvestite inmate to further the escape plan. In the episode "Bluff" his skills at rigging a deck of cards also help the team. Upon learning in "The Key" that Abruzzi has returned to the prison, Bagwell is frightened and makes a second attempt on Abruzzi's life but is stopped by C-Note, who reminds him that Abruzzi is providing their transportation. Abruzzi claims to have forgiven Bagwell, but the characters keep a wary eye on each other for the rest of the season. In the final episode of the season, Bagwell escapes from Fox River along with Michael, Abruzzi, C-Note, Tweener, and three other inmates. In order to ensure his safety, he handcuffs himself to Michael, knowing that it will keep Abruzzi from killing him. Abruzzi gets his revenge when he cuts off Bagwell's cuffed hand with an axe, seriously wounding him and leaving him for dead. Despite this, Bagwell survives and eludes capture. His last scene of the season features the character staggering through the woods with his severed hand tucked into his armpit.

=== Season 2 ===
Bagwell has his hand reattached by a veterinary surgeon named Dr. Marvin Gudat, whom he murders afterwards. Bagwell then bleaches his hair to change his appearance, and begins his four episode long journey to Utah, to locate the money Charles Westmoreland had hidden there. In the fifth, sixth and seventh episodes, he rejoins part of the main cast as the group of five fugitives dig for Westmoreland's five million dollars under a garage. Bagwell tricks the other fugitives, stealing all the money, and sets out to find Susan Hollander, the woman who betrayed him. From the eighth episode onwards, Bagwell's storyline separates from the main plot, which concerns the protagonists escaping and later deciding to solve the conspiracy. In the following episode, "Unearthed", Bagwell arrives at Hollander's house, which has been vacated and is for sale. He is captured at the house by Brad Bellick (Wade Williams) and Roy Geary (Matt DeCaro) after hiding the five million dollars in a locker at a bus station. The next episode follows Bellick and Geary's torture of Bagwell as they try to discover where he has hidden the money. During the torture, the key to the locker that Bagwell had hidden in his sock falls out. The three men scuffle to retrieve it. Bagwell grabs the key and swallows it. Bellick and Geary tie Bagwell to a toilet in the house and shove Copenhagen tobacco in his mouth, along with laxatives. Bagwell passes the key, which has the location information on it. They clean it up, and use plastic handcuffs to attach his wrist to a radiator. Bagwell escapes from the cuff in "Bolshoi Booze" by re-severing his hand. Geary betrays Bellick and takes the money to an upscale hotel. Bagwell, having placed a tracking device in the bag, tracks it down and kills Geary by smashing his head with a champagne bottle. Before leaving with the money, Bagwell frames Bellick for Geary's murder, by placing Bellick's credit card receipt in Geary's dead, bloody hand. In the "fall finale" episode "The Killing Box" the last episode to air for 2006 in the United States, Bagwell sees a Vietnam war vet in a bar, who has a prosthetic hand. It's implied that Bagwell killed the man, as in his next scene of the episode, Bagwell is in possession of the prosthetic hand. He then takes advantage of a postal worker with his wily charms to gain access to Susan Hollander's new address. The postal worker genuinely likes Bagwell, until she recognizes him from a Wanted poster on the wall. Ever the survivalist, Bagwell eliminates her.

Bagwell eventually locates Susan, which served as one of the episode's cliffhangers. In his next two appearances of the season, he holds Susan and her children hostage in their home in Ness City, Kansas. He takes them to his childhood home in Alabama in "Bad Blood", where he reveals that they are his "salvation" and that he wants to become part of their family. He also explains that he is incapable of having children, presumably because of the nature of his own conception, and that the Bagwell bloodline will die with him. Throughout the episode he is haunted by flashbacks of his childhood, including the sexual abuse he received from his father. Susan rebuffs him, however, saying that she is not able to love him. Bagwell is heartbroken by her rejection and finally leaves them, calling the police to release them from his home. Beginning from the eighteenth episode, the next part of Bagwell's storyline concerns his decision to travel to Thailand. After taking the identity from a therapist he deliberately kills, Bagwell buys a ticket to Bangkok and boards a stop-over flight from Chicago, which coincidentally is the same plane Bellick is flying on. Bagwell recognizes Bellick at Mexico City International Airport in the episode "Sweet Caroline" and is forced to hide, consequently losing his money in the luggage carousel. He then grapples with a security guard in an attempt to retrieve the money, but fails to overpower him or retrieve the money. He runs away to avoid being captured. Later, security footage of him fleeing is transmitted on a Mexican news station.

After narrowly avoiding Sucre and Bellick in the episode "Panama", Bagwell travels to Panama; there he murders a prostitute. During an unseen encounter, Bagwell is coerced by Agent Kim into aiding the company's plot to capture Lincoln and Michael, who are also in Panama. Kim's plot fails in the following episode, "Fin Del Camino", however, and T-Bag finds himself being chased by Bellick, Sucre, and Michael. He escapes Bellick by shooting him in the leg, but is captured soon after by Sucre and Michael. Bagwell escapes once again by stabbing Sucre in the chest with a screwdriver but is followed by Michael to an abandoned house. After Michael refuses Bagwell's truce (feeling responsible for everyone Bagwell has killed since escaping from prison), the two fight. Michael ultimately apprehends Bagwell by viciously impaling his remaining hand to the floor and leaving him for the Panamanian police. He then is transferred to a Panamanian cell, where Bellick is also imprisoned. In his last appearance of the season, Bagwell is seen screaming in a Panamanian jail, a man from the Company leaving him imprisoned for "getting caught". Bagwell is the fifth member of the Fox River Eight to be taken down by the authorities, and the second member not to die upon interception (the first being C-Note).

=== Season 3 ===
Imprisoned in Sona along with Michael, Bellick, and Mahone, Bagwell is once again able to charm his way to an easier prison life than most, ingratiating himself to Lechero, a drug lord who is the most powerful man inside. Michael soon blackmails Bagwell about his pedophilic past, in order to gain access to Lechero's cell phone. Bagwell gets Michael the cellphone, but when it is put back Lechero notices that it had been moved. In order to deflect suspicion, Bagwell gets Lechero to question the loyalty of his right-hand man, Sammy, who has been openly hostile to Bagwell. Lechero is successfully manipulated into enlisting Bagwell as his personal spy, increasing Bagwell's position in the prison hierarchy.

Bagwell then gains the trust of Lechero's head drug smuggler and dealer, Nieves, only to then kill him by suffocating him with a plastic bag. He also covers up his murder by making it look like a drug overdose, and as a result replaces Nieves on Lechero's crew in the prison. He also protects Sister Mary Francis when the guards enter Sona, developing a liking for her in the process. When she steals Lechero's money, he diverts blame from her on to him and is punished for it by Lechero.

Later, when James Whistler is accused of murder and set to be killed, Bagwell attempts to 'help' Michael by asking him to frame his rival Sammy for the murder but Michael refuses to go through with it. When Michael and Whistler are caught trying to escape Sona twice, T-Bag becomes suspicious and figures out that Michael is trying to escape. He blackmails his way onto the team but, along with Bellick and Lechero, is tricked by Michael and captured to allow the others to escape.

After the escape, he is tortured until he says Fernando Sucre knows everything that happened about the escape. He finds the bird book that Whistler dropped and puts it into his pocket. He then is taken back to Sona and forms an ambitious plan to kill Lechero. He tricks Lechero into supplying $50,000 for an "escape" and then smothers him in front of a shocked Bellick. T-Bag then goes to the masses and hands out part of the $50,000 to all the cons. He begins the chant "all cons are equal" and ingratiates himself with everybody, leaving T-Bag as the new ruler of Sona.

=== Season 4 ===
T-Bag's character is once again central to the plot, as he holds Whistler's bird book. As mentioned by Lincoln in the premiere episode, a riot in Sona led to T-Bag, Sucre, and Bellick escaping between the third and the fourth season. Much of T-Bag's character arc in this season is devoted to exploring the friction between his discovered yearning for legitimacy and his desire to seek revenge on Michael for leaving him behind in earlier seasons. After crossing the border, T-Bag begins to uncover the clues in the bird book and finds documents conjured up by Whistler to portray Cole Pfeiffer, a top salesman at a corporation called GATE. This forces T-Bag's character to become critical to the plot. T-Bag's storyline is initially separated from the other main characters, and he spends most of his screen time attempting to carry on his charade as the top salesman for the Gate Corporation, while spending most of his time trying to decipher the contents of Whistler's bird book. Eventually, another sales manager exposes him as a fraud, and he quickly flees the building before being arrested. This begins his involvement with the main plotline. In the next episode, he is taken captive by former Company operative Gretchen Morgan, who interrogates him for his role in obtaining Scylla, The company's little black book. T-Bag learns that the bird book is a means to this end, and that there are people prepared to pay large sums of money for Scylla. For the next few episodes, T-Bag and Gretchen form a partnership, and while she murders the co-worker that exposed T-Bag, he takes Trishanne, the secretary from Gate Corporation, hostage to lure Michael to him and forces him at gunpoint to decipher the clues in Whistler's bird book. They eventually discover the book contains blueprints to the Gate Corporation building, including a path to where Scylla can be decrypted. While forcing Michael at gunpoint into the secret compartment, Bagwell is surprised by Mahone, who along with Michael, captures him. T-Bag is freed in the next episode at the urging of Gretchen, and Michael and his team reluctantly accept him as an ally, as T-Bag's access to Gate is valuable to the plan.

In the following episodes, T-Bag appears mainly in scenes at Gate, where he continues to play a salesman. It is established that, together with Gretchen, he is planning on double crossing Michael and his team after they steal Scylla, in order to sell it to a Chinese crime syndicate for 125 million dollars. By the episode "Quiet Riot", it becomes apparent that Gretchen is clearly the more ruthless and devoted to the plan, while T-Bag begins to grow increasingly attached to his new life and his dialogue shows that he wishes that he actually was Cole Pfeiffer rather than Theodore Bagwell. Because of this, the character often shows a softer side in this part of the season. For instance after he learns about the death of Bellick, T-Bag seems to be somewhat upset, despite the nature of their relationship in past seasons. However, he is still shown as intent on exacting revenge on Michael. T-Bag and Gretchen are waiting in T-Bag's office with machine guns in "Selfless" prepared to ambush the Scylla team when they return. When T-Bag's boss Mr. White spots Gretchen's gun under the table, she takes the entire company hostage. Seeing his chance at a new life at Gate being destroyed forever, T-Bag reluctantly helps her take the GATE employees hostage, but in the same episode T-Bag is arrested by Trishanne (who is actually an under-cover federal agent sent by Homeland Security agent Don Self). At the end of the episode, Michael's team is successful in getting Scylla and hands it over to Self who, in the episode's twist ending, betrays everyone and steals Scylla. After Self murders Trishanne, he forces T-Bag to help him track down Gretchen by giving him the home address of her sister Rita and daughter Emily, whom T-Bag holds hostage while Gretchen and Self find a new buyer for Scylla. In the episode "Just Business", T-Bag continues to mourn the loss of his new life. When a bible salesman asks to come in, T-Bag believes him to be a Company agent and takes him hostage. After saying he wanted to be Cole Pffeifer and not Theodore Bagwell, he is about to kill the man when Rita tells him not to, saying that he has a chance for a new life. So he lets Rita and Emily go and unties the man, only to be knocked unconscious, proving that the man was a Company agent.

In the final third of the season, T-Bag is forced by The company to work with Lincoln, Gretchen, and Self to get Scylla back by tracking down the buyer. The team is later joined by Mahone. When Gretchen is shot in a fire-fight with the buyer's underlings, T-Bag's character shows lingering hints of his softer side as he implores the others to spare Gretchen's life. Still holding onto his desire for legitimacy, however, T-Bag continues to work with the rest of the team in the next few episodes, but also spies on the rest of them, and in several episodes reports back to The company's leader, General Krantz, with secret information that he has overheard. It is revealed in "VS" and "SOB" that T-Bag hopes to be rewarded for his efforts by becoming a fully fledged Company operative with his own office and desk. As the plot unfolds, he begins to grow back into his old ruthless persona. After the general arrives in Miami in "SOB", T-Bag starts working more directly with him and his minions. Attempting to impress the general and give him leverage against Michael, T-Bag tracks down Michael's girlfriend Sara Tancredi and holds her captive in "Cowboys and Indians". Still bent on revenge on Michael, T-Bag decides to rape Sara in "Rate of Exchange", but is knocked unconscious by Michael, who rescues Sara. After Michael hands over Scylla to Paul Kellerman, he gives them the option of letting T-Bag be exonerated with the rest of them or not. In the end, Sara, Michael, Lincoln, Sucre, Mahone and C-Note vote to have him taken back to prison. In the character's final appearance in the series epilogue of the series finale, set 4 years after the main events of the show, T-Bag is revealed to be back at Fox River. He is seen overhearing an inmate speaking of the captivity of negativity (a term used by GATE). He sees the inmate was reading a book from GATE and he warns the inmate, telling him he does not ever want to see that book again and the inmate replies, referring to T-Bag as sir. He is last seen whistling to a boy to hold his pocket. T-Bag looks up at the sky, once again the king of prison. He is the only member of the Fox River Eight to be in prison when the series ended.

=== The Final Break ===
During the movie Prison Break: The Final Break, it shows T-Bag was taken back to jail, in a neighboring prison to Sara. In the prison T-Bag continues to help the General, even though the General claims poverty when asked to pay for contraband T-Bag gets him. The General contacts Gretchen and offers her $100,000 to kill Sara.

Michael comes up with a plan to parachute into the prison and rescue Sara. Lincoln offers T-Bag $5,000 to light a fire and set off the fire alarm at 7:00pm the night of the escape. T-Bag demands $100,000, and suggests they can get it by robbing the General of the money he has to pay the bounty on Sara. T-Bag did this to settle grudges with the General, including the General's refusal to pay T-Bag for favors in jail. T-Bag provides Lincoln with the name and phone number of Joe Daniels, (Richmond Arquette) the General's agent. Lincoln agrees to steal the money and put it in T-Bag's account by 7:00. Lincoln and Sucre then steal the $100,000 from Daniels. When T-Bag finds out that the transfer did not take place by 7:00 as promised, he angrily reveals the plot to the warden, and tells her that he was instructed to set off the fire alarm. Special Agent Wheatley responds by demanding the fire alarm and other systems that would cover other noises be turned off. This turned out to be part of Michael's plan knowing T-Bag would talk to the warden. Due to aiding in Sara's escape, T-Bag is put into solitary confinement.

=== Breakout Kings ===
In the Breakout Kings episode "The Bag Man", T-Bag again breaks out of prison to get revenge on the orderlies who wronged his mother. He escapes by stabbing a guard to death with his prosthetic hand, which he has sharpened to a point, while being escorted to the hospital for a replacement. T-Bag is eventually caught and briefly interviewed by Dr. Lloyd Lowery, who wants to find some clue as to the reasoning behind T-Bag's actions. Lloyd concludes the interview by saying, "Some machines come out of the factory broken. You're a broken machine." Once he is left alone in the interrogation room, Bagwell quietly agrees.

=== Season 5 ===
T-Bag returns in the revival season, set seven years after the events of The Final Break. He begins the season still incarcerated at Fox River, but is soon released due to an unknown benefactor. While receiving his possessions back, he receives an envelope that contains a picture of Michael, apparently alive in Ogygia Prison in Yemen. T-Bag contacts Lincoln in Chicago, where he reveals the photo. Lincoln understandably doesn't trust T-Bag, but keeps the photo nonetheless. T-Bag is soon contacted by a doctor who offers him a procedure that would equip him with a robotic hand. T-Bag is skeptical at first, but agrees to undergo the process. After the procedure, he threatens the doctor and demands to know who set it up, and the doctor reveals a man known only as "Outis", Michael's alias in Yemen.

After a one episode absence, T-Bag returns in "The Liar". He tracks down Sara and he reveals he knows about Michael's activities as Kaniel Outis. He warns Sara of mercenaries tracking her, though Sara rebuffs him. After escaping the mercenaries' attempt on her life, she learns her phone was hacked via her own fingerprint, and suspects Paul Kellerman. Sara contacts T-Bag and asks him to set up a meeting with Kellerman to find out what he knows, to which T-Bag accepts.

Bagwell tracks Kellerman to his home and holds him at gunpoint, believing him to be the villainous Poseidon, a rogue CIA operative who is looking to do away with Michael for good and sent his agents after Sara. Kellerman explains he is not Poseidon, but was looking into his operation, known as 21 Void. Before he can finish explaining, Kellerman is killed by Poseidon's mercenaries Van Gogh and A&W, but T-Bag escapes. He later tracks the mercenaries to Virginia in Kellerman's car, where he witnesses them meeting with Jacob, Sara's new husband. T-Bag relays this information to Sara.

After a three-episode absence, T-Bag returns in the penultimate episode of the season, reading a letter from Michael that concludes with a warning that in exchange for his freedom, T-Bag "must take a life." T-Bag drives to Lake Michigan, where he leaves a remorseful message to God on his phone. He then confronts David "Whip" Martin, Michael's right-hand man during his CIA exploits, and reveals that though he thought himself infertile, Michael discovered that he is Whip's father.

In the season finale, Michael reveals he contacted T-Bag as he knew Poseidon, revealed to be Jacob, wouldn't monitor their communications due to Michael's hatred for T-Bag. Michael tells T-Bag he wants him to kill Jacob to ensure everyone can get a happy life even though it means T-Bag will go back to prison. Despite David's objections, T-Bag consents, feeling that some people need to die. T-Bag aids Michael in his plan to frame Jacob, but it goes awry when A&W kills David. An enraged T-Bag snaps A&W's neck and is sent back to Fox River for her murder. There, thanks to Michael, he ends up with Jacob as his cellmate. As the Fox River inmates cheer him on, T-Bag brutally assaults Jacob.

== Reception ==
T-Bag is described by TV Guide's Maya Schechter as "one of the creepiest characters on television" and is mentioned by Entertainment Weekly as one of "TV's best villains".

== Production details ==
Silas Weir Mitchell, who was cast in the role of Charles "Haywire" Patoshik, originally auditioned for the role of T-Bag. Mitchell impressed the production crew enough with his performance, they created the character of Haywire for him.
