= Martin Lawrence Live Talkin' Shit =

Studio album by Martin Lawrence
- Released: 1993
- Recorded: 1993
- Genre: Comedy
- Length: 47:26
- Label: East West
- Producer: Martin Lawrence; Kenny Buford; Biff Dawes

Martin Lawrence chronology
Martin Lawrence Live Talkin' Shit (1993)	Funk It (1995)

Professional ratings
Review scores
Source	Rating
AllMusic	2/5 stars

Martin Lawrence Live Talkin' Sh*t is the debut album by comedian Martin Lawrence. The album was released in 1993 for East West Records. Martin Lawrence Live Talkin' Sh*t was met with negative reviews but still managed to make it to No. 76 on the Billboard 200 and No. 10 on the Top R&B/Hip-Hop Albums charts. Two singles were released, "Boxin'" and "White Kids/Black Kids", but neither made it to the Billboard charts.

== Track listing ==
1. "Introduction" – 1:53
2. "Boxin'" – 6:31
3. "Eddie's House" – 2:49
4. "Worrying About Your Weight" – 5:35
5. "Michael Jackson" – 4:18
6. "Ilaldo" – 1:16
7. "White Kids/Black Kids" – 1:50
8. "Smokin' Weed" – 2:49
9. "Drivin' Cross Country" – 3:41
10. "I Love Sex" – 2:47
11. "Braggin On Their Dicks" – 5:53
12. "Talking During Sex" – 3:21
13. "Head" – 5:36
14. "Fartin' and Shitin'" – 3:25

== Charts ==
=== Weekly charts ===
Chart (1993)	Peak position
US Billboard 200	76
US Top R&B/Hip-Hop Albums (Billboard)	10

=== Year-end charts ===
Chart (1993)	Position
US Top R&B/Hip-Hop Albums (Billboard)	95
Chart (1994)	Position
US Top R&B/Hip-Hop Albums (Billboard)	99
