= Warhunt =

2022 film by Mauro Borrelli

- Directed by: Mauro Borrelli
- Written by: Mauro Borrelli; Reggie Keyohara III; Scott Svatos
- Story by: Mauro Borrelli
- Produced by: Yu-Fai Suen; Julie Zaytseva; Adel Nur; Max Pavlov
- Starring: Mickey Rourke
- Music by: Tao Liu
- Production companies: Forma Pro Films; Atomik Content
- Distributed by: Saban Films
- Release date: January 21, 2022
- Running time: 93 min
- Country: United States
- Language: English

Warhunt is a 2022 American horror film directed by Mauro Borrelli and starring Mickey Rourke.

== Synopsis ==
During World War II, a U.S. military cargo plane crashes behind enemy lines in Germany's Black Forest. Maj. Johnson soon sends a squad of his bravest soldiers to retrieve the top-secret material from the wreckage. Venturing deep into the forest, the team discovers hanged Nazis and other bodies bearing ancient, magical symbols. Attacked by a powerful, supernatural force, the men soon find themselves in a fight for their lives as they try to uncover the shocking truth behind the unspeakable evil.

== Cast ==
- Mickey Rourke
- Robert Knepper
- Jackson Rathbone

== Production ==
The film was shot in Riga.

Filming wrapped in April 2020.

== Release ==
The film was released in theaters, on digital and on demand on January 21, 2022.

== Reception ==
On the review aggregator website Rotten Tomatoes, 19% of 21 critics' reviews are positive, with an average rating of 4.6/10.

Joe Leydon of Variety gave the film a positive review and wrote, "Blood-drained Nazis! Predatory witches! Mind-twisted soldiers! And Mickey Rourke in an eyepatch! Cowabunga!"

Michael Pementel of Bloody Disgusting also gave it a positive review, giving it four "skulls" out of five.
