= Wild Thing (film) =

1987 film by Max Reid

- Directed by: Max Reid
- Screenplay by: John Sayles
- Story by: Larry Stamper; John Sayles
- Produced by: David Calloway; Nicolas Clermont
- Starring: Robert Knepper; Kathleen Quinlan
- Cinematography: René Verzier
- Edited by: Battle Davis; Steven Rosenblum
- Music by: George S. Clinton
- Production company: Filmline International
- Distributed by: Atlantic Releasing Corporation
- Release date: April 17, 1987
- Running time: 92 minutes
- Countries: United States; Canada
- Language: English
- Budget: $4,5 million
- Box office: US$84,000

Wild Thing is a 1987 American-Canadian film directed by Max Reid and starring Robert Knepper and Kathleen Quinlan. The screenplay was by John Sayles and the story by Larry Stamper. The film was distributed by the Atlantic Entertainment Group.

Director Max Reid called it "a fairytale for adults."

== Plot ==
When his parents are killed in a botched drug deal, a young boy is taken in by a bag lady who teaches him about the Blue Coats (Cops) and White Coats (Doctors). After her death, he becomes an urban Tarzan defending innocents in a large city. He soon becomes an urban legend and champion of street justice, espousing a 1960s philosophy and coming to the aid of the helpless and oppressed. Jane is the concerned social worker who falls for the hero.

Armed with a bow and arrow and makeshift equipment such as a grappling hook made from an old umbrella, he and his cat sidekick set out to avenge his parents death when he finds the drug dealer that killed them. The song Wild Thing by the rock band The Troggs is played as a sort of theme music for this unlikely hero.

== Cast ==
- Robert Knepper as Wild Thing
  - Guillaume Lemay-Thivierge as Wild Thing (10 years old)
- Kathleen Quinlan as Jane
- Robert Davi as Chopper
- Maury Chaykin as Jonathan Trask
- Betty Buckley as Leah
- Clark Johnson as Winston
- Sean Hewitt as Father Quinn
- Teddy Abner as Rasheed
- Cree Summer as Lisa
- Shawn Levy as Paul

== Production ==
According to John Sayles, "there was an original writer and then there was a guy who did a major rewrite on it. The producers didn’t like his rewrite; they had me come in, I rewrote it pretty heavily, but I didn’t come up with the original story. Then they hired the guy who had written the second draft to direct it, but told him" he could not change the script. Sayles said "it was this weird thing—the director working on a script he thought had been ruined." He says the first two writers refused to take credit so he was given sole credit.

The film was shot in Montreal in August–September 1986. Director Max Reid was best known for his work in documentaries.

== Reception ==
Variety called it "one of those film oddities that is impossible to categorize. Story of an urban Tarzan is by turns sanctimonious and silly with detours for street philosophizing, ’60s idealism, gang uprisings and exhortations for non-violence from the neighborhood priest. One can only watch with a curious fascination and wonder what in the world is going on here."

The Los Angeles Times called it "an amiable and inventive urban fairytale" and "refreshingly smart."
