= Funk It =

Live album by Martin Lawrence

Funk It!

Studio album by Martin Lawrence
- Released: 1995
- Recorded: 1995
- Genre: Stand-up comedy
- Length: 59:33
- Label: East West
- Producer: Martin Lawrence; Kenny Buford; Biff Dawes

Martin Lawrence chronology
| Martin Lawrence Live Talkin' Shit (1993) | Funk It! (1995) |

Funk It! is the second album by American comedian Martin Lawrence, released in October 1995. The album was nominated for Grammy Award for comedy (Best Spoken Album) in 1996.

Commercially it went on to reach to #35 on the Top R&B/Hip-Hop Albums.

== Track listing ==
1. "Open With Rev. Ford"- 4:14
2. "Doin' Time in Hollywood"- 3:40
3. "Door to Door Comic"- :28
4. "Wash Yo' Ass"- 1:12
5. "Executive Pussy"- 3:31
6. "Had One Girl..."- 10:44
7. "Bobbitt"- 12:24
8. "Jesus' Chicken"- :55
9. "The Friendly Skies"- 3:40
10. "Everybody's Gangsta"- 3:42
11. "70's Heckle"- 1:18
12. "Weekend Wash"- :58
13. "Cops"- 2:30
14. "The Dog"- 3:10
15. "Frontin' on the Cellular"- 1:56
16. "Suicide"- 5:11
