= Robert Knepper =

American actor (born 1959)

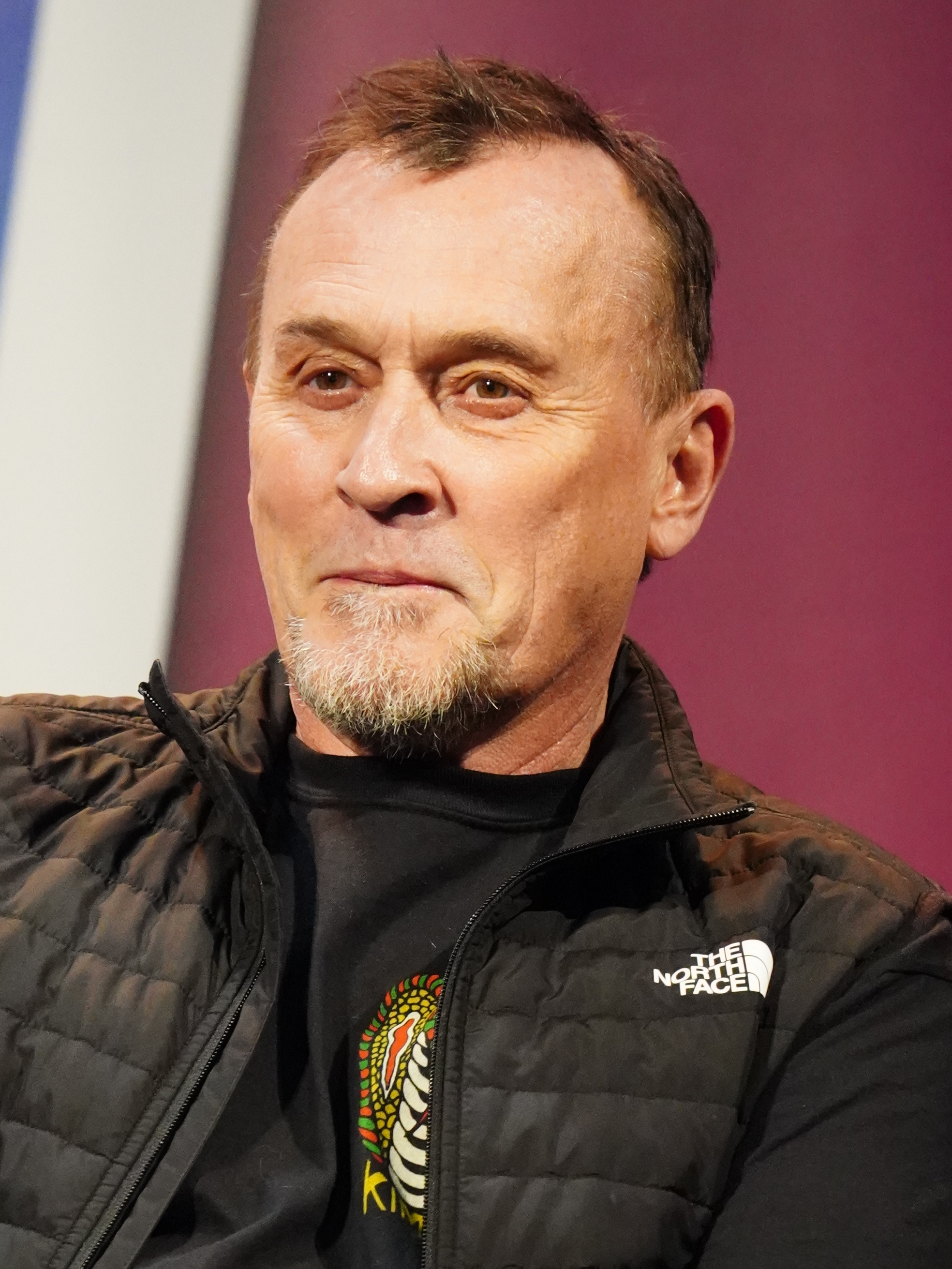
- Knepper in 2026
- Born: Robert Lyle Knepper; July 8, 1959 (age 67); Fremont, Ohio, U.S.
- Occupation: Actor
- Years active: 1977–present
- Spouses: Tory Herald (m. 2005; div. 2009) Nadine Kary (m. 2013)
- Children: 1

Robert Lyle Knepper (born July 8, 1959) is an American actor best known for his role as Theodore "T-Bag" Bagwell in the Fox drama series Prison Break (2005–2009, 2017), Samuel Sullivan in the final season of the NBC series Heroes (2009–2010), Angus McDonough in The CW series iZombie (2015–2018) and Rodney Mitchum in Showtime's revival of Twin Peaks (2017). He has appeared in films such as Hitman (2007), Transporter 3 (2008) and Jack Reacher: Never Go Back (2016).

== Early life ==
Robert Lyle Knepper was born July 8, 1959, in Fremont, Ohio, and raised in Maumee, Ohio, the son of Pat Deck and Donald Knepper, a veterinarian. He was interested in acting from an early age, due to his mother's involvement as a props-handler at a community theater. After graduating from Maumee High School in 1977, he attended Northwestern University; during this time, Knepper obtained professional roles in plays in Chicago. Nearing the completion of his degree, Knepper quit Northwestern and went to New York City, where he continued to work in theater.

== Career ==
Although Knepper did not intend to work in film and television projects, he began his television and film career in 1986 with The Paper Chase and That's Life!. Knepper went on to have larger roles in such films as Wild Thing, Young Guns II, When the Bough Breaks and Everyone Says I Love You. He made appearances on such television series as The Twilight Zone, Star Trek: The Next Generation, ER and Law & Order. In 2005, after a recurring role on the HBO series Carnivàle, Knepper was cast in his best-known role, as Theodore "T-Bag" Bagwell in Prison Break. The series received positive reviews upon release, and "T-Bag" is often considered to be one of the greatest television villains of all time. During his time on Prison Break, Knepper starred in a number of films; Good Night, and Good Luck, Hitman, Transporter 3 and The Day the Earth Stood Still.

After Prison Break ended in 2009, Knepper was cast as villain Samuel Sullivan in the fourth and final season of Heroes. After this, he went on to have a recurring role in Stargate Universe in 2010. He guest-starred on season six of Criminal Minds as Rhett Walden, a serial killer. The same year he played the titular character in the film adaptation of Burning Daylight.

In addition, Knepper appeared as Honolulu Police Internal Affairs detective Rex Coughlin in two episodes of Hawaii Five-0.

In 2011, he reprised his role of T-Bag in one episode of the A&E series Breakout Kings. The next year, he played Frank Sinatra in My Way, a biopic of Claude François, a French pop singer who wrote the song "Comme d'habitude", the original version of Sinatra's song "My Way".

Knepper was cast in the 2013 television series Cult as Roger Reeves, an actor playing Billy Grimm on a show called Cult. The show was canceled after only one season. The same year, he appeared in R.I.P.D., Percy Jackson: Sea of Monsters and guest starred on the television series The Blacklist (episode: "The Courier"). At the end of 2013, the TNT series Mob City premiered, in which Knepper played gangster Sid Rothman. In 2014, Knepper guest starred in episodes of Arrow and The Flash as master hacker and time-and-motion study expert William Tockman / Clock King.

Beginning in 2015, Knepper had a recurring role on iZombie as Angus McDonough, the estranged and abusive father of Blaine DeBeers (David Anders). It was announced in July 2017 that Knepper would be promoted to the show's main cast for season 4.

Knepper was cast in the reboot of David Lynch's Twin Peaks as gangster Rodney Mitchum. He later voiced the audiobook adaptation for the tie-in epistolary novel of the show called The Secret History of Twin Peaks.

== Personal life ==
Knepper has a son, Benjamin Peter (born 2002), with his first wife, Tory Herald. He married his second wife, Nadine Kary, in 2013.

=== Sexual assault allegations ===
On November 8, 2017, costume designer Susan Bertram accused Knepper of sexual assault on the set of the film Gas Food Lodging in 1991. Knepper denied the allegations in a since-deleted Instagram post. On February 28, 2018, Bertram's lawyers announced she was filing a defamation lawsuit against Knepper in Los Angeles County Superior Court in the wake of his denials, seeking damages in a jury trial. Knepper's lawyers denied that he defamed Bertram. On June 1, 2021, Bertram's attorney announced that the lawsuit had been settled; the terms have not been publicized.

Four additional allegations taking place between 1983 and 2014 were made by women against Knepper on December 5, 2017, including an accusation of rape in Vancouver, Canada in 2010. All of the allegations were denied by Knepper.

Late in 2017, in the wake of these accusations, The CW Network conducted an internal inquiry. Finding no evidence of misconduct transpiring on the set, it was announced he would be remaining on iZombie. On January 12, 2018, it was announced that the studio had conducted a second investigation. The CW Network president Mark Pedowitz stated, "Again, the investigation related to the set and his behavior on the set. They found no wrongdoing on the set." Pedowitz elaborated that Knepper had signed on for a single season and that his exit from the series had already been planned.

== Filmography ==
=== Film ===
Year	Title	Role	Notes
1986	That's Life!	Steve Larwin	
1987	Wild Thing	Wild Thing	
1987	Made in Heaven	Orrin	
1988	D.O.A.	Nicholas Lang	
1989	Renegades	Marino	
1990	Arduous Moon	Andrew	Short film
1990	Young Guns II	Deputy Carlyle	
1991	Session Man	Torrey Cole	Short film
1991	Where the Day Takes You	Rock Singer	
1992	Gas Food Lodging	Dank	
1994	When the Bough Breaks	Lt. Jimmy Creedmore	
1994	Under the Heat	Milo	
1995	Search and Destroy	Daniel Strong	
1996	Dead of Night	Christian	
1996	MugShot	Joe	
1996	Everyone Says I Love You	Greg	
1996	The Undercover Kid	Bo the Dog (voice)	
1996	The Hunchback of Notre Dame	Frollo's Soldiers (voice)	
1997	You Are Here	Jack	
1998	Phantoms	Agent Wilson	
1998	The Stringer	John	
1998	Jaded	Freddy	
2000	Love & Sex	Gerard Boussard	
2001	Lady in the Box	Chris Stark	
2002	Topa Topa Bluffs	Frank	
2002	Swatters	Daniel Steinberg	
2004	Species III	Dr. Bruce Abbot	
2005	Good Night, and Good Luck	Don Surine	
2005	Hostage	Will Bechler	
2007	Hitman	Yuri Marklov	
2008	Turok: Son of Stone	Chickak (voice)	Direct-to-DVD
2008	Transporter 3	Johnson	
2008	The Day the Earth Stood Still	Colonel	
2010	Burning Daylight	Elam "Burning Daylight" Harnish	
2011	Earth's Final Hours	John Streich	
2012	My Way	Frank Sinatra	
2012	Seal Team Six: The Raid on Osama Bin Laden	Lieutenant commander	
2013	R.I.P.D.	Stanley Nawlicki	
2013	Percy Jackson: Sea of Monsters	Kronos (voice)	
2014	Ride	Peter	
2014	The Hunger Games: Mockingjay – Part 1	Minister Antonius	
2015	The Hoarder	Vince	
2015	The Hunger Games: Mockingjay – Part 2	Minister Antonius	
2015	Cold Deck	Turk	
2016	Hard Target 2	Aldrich	Direct-to-DVD
2016	Jack Reacher: Never Go Back	General Harkness	
2017	Badsville	Mr. Gavin	
2018	Frat Pack	Kush	
2018	Edge of Fear	Victor Novak	
2019	1st Born	Joe	
2019	Defended War		
2019	Voice of the Nation		
2019	S.W.A.T.	Sam	
2019	The Trapped	Victor	
2020	Battle of Defense		
2021	Lena and Snowball	Percy	
2021	Redemption Day	Mr. K	
2021	The Retaliators	Otto	
2022	Warhunt	Sgt. Brewer	
2022	The Moderator	Agent John Ross	
2022	Mindcage	Lt. Owings	
2025	The Last Supper	Judas Iscariot	
2025	The Lost Princess	Robert Goodman	
2025	Al Zarfa (Arabic Film)	Himself	
TBA	Drifter †	TBA	Filming

=== Television ===
Year	Title	Role	Notes
1986	The Paper Chase	Howard	Episode: "Graduation"
1986–1993	L.A. Law	George 'Georgia' Buckner / David Orcott	3 episodes
1987	Tour of Duty	Racist Soldier	Episode: "Burn, Baby, Burn"
1987	The Twilight Zone	Alonzo	Episode: "Joy Ride"
1987	Tour of Duty	PV2 Allen	Episode: "Burn Baby, Burn"
1987	Star Trek: The Next Generation	Wyatt Miller	Episode: "Haven"
1989	Gideon Oliver	Paul Hecht	Episode: "Kennonite"
1990	E.A.R.T.H. Force	Dr. Peter Roland	3 episodes
1990–1991	China Beach	Long / Vietnam Vet	2 episodes
1991	Perry Mason: The Case of the Fatal Fashion	Kim Weatherly	Television film
1991	Civil Wars	Joey D'Amato	Episode: "Have Gun, Will Unravel"
1992	Tequila and Bonetti	Ren Philips	Episode: "Runt of the Litter"
1992	Red Shoe Diaries	Nick Willard	Episode: "You Have the Right to Remain Silent"
1993	Zelda	Wilson	Television film
1993	Doorways	Thane	Pilot
1993–1996	Murder, She Wrote	Charles George Drexler / Owen McLaglen / Robbie Dorow	3 episodes
1994	Pointman	Johnny	Television film
1994	Getting Out	Carl	Television film
1995	Law & Order	Igor Smith	Episode: "Rebels"
1995	New York Undercover	David Carson	Episode: "Buster and Claudia"
1995	New York News	Ex-Con	Episode: "Fun City"
1995	Pointman	Ronnie McCusak	Episode: "Here She Comes, Miss Murder"
1996	Voice from the Grave	Milosh	Television film
1996	Central Park West	Randy Boyd	Episode: "Guess Who's Come to Annoy You?"
1996	The Big Easy	Jack Gentry	Episode: "The Gambler"
1996	Desert Breeze	—N/a	Pilot
1997	The Visitor	Alex Burton	Episode: "Dreams"
1998	ER	Keith Reynolds	Episode: "My Brother's Keeper"
1998	Brimstone	Assistant D.A. Stewart Lambert	Episode: "Executioner"
1999	Strange World	Gil Sandifer	Episode: "Azrael's Breed"
1999	Kidnapped in Paradise	Renard	Television film
1999	Absence of the Good	Glenn Dwyer	Television film
1999	Star Trek: Voyager	Gaul	Episode: "Dragon's Teeth"
2000	Harsh Realm	Priest	Episode: "Camera Obscura"
2000	Profiler	Martin Lewis	Episode: "Tsuris"
2000	Seven Days	Major Gene Hastings	Episode: "Space Station Down"
2000	La Femme Nikita	Henry Collins	Episode: "Toys in the Basement"
2001	The West Wing	Morgan Ross	Episode: "Ellie"
2001	Jackie, Ethel, Joan: The Women of Camelot	Robert F. Kennedy	Television film
2001	Law & Order: Criminal Intent	Dr. Peter Kelmer	Episode: "The Good Doctor"
2001	Thieves	Special Agent Shue	10 episodes
2002	Haunted	Henry	Episode: "Pilot"
2002	The Pennsylvania Miners' Story	Mark Popernack	Television film
2002–2003	Presidio Med	Sean	5 episodes
2003–2005	Carnivàle	Tommy Dolan	13 episodes
2004	Species III	Dr. Bruce Abbot	Television film
2004	CSI: Miami	Freddy Coleman	Episode: "Addiction"
2005	Point Pleasant	Demon Dance Host	Episode: "Last Dance"
2005–2009; 2017	Prison Break	Theodore "T-Bag" Bagwell	75 episodes
2009	Prison Break: The Final Break	Theodore "T-Bag" Bagwell	Television film
2009–2010	Heroes	Samuel Sullivan	19 episodes
2010	Stargate Universe	Simeon	6 episodes
2010	Chase	Jack Druggan	Episode: "The Comeback Kid"
2010	Criminal Minds	Rhett Walden	Episode: "Reflection of Desire"
2011	Shameless	Rod	2 episodes
2011	Breakout Kings	Theodore "T-Bag" Bagwell	Episode: "The Bag Man"
2012	Seal Team Six: The Raid on Osama Bin Laden	Lieutenant Commander	Television film
2013	Cult	Roger Reeves /Billy Grimm	13 episodes
2013	The Blacklist	The Courier	Episode: "The Courier"
2013	Mob City	Sid Rothman	6 episodes
2014–2015	Hawaii Five-0	Internal Affairs Officer Coughlin	2 episodes
2014	Arrow	William Tockman / Clock King	Episode: "Time of Death"
2014	The Flash	William Tockman / Clock King	Episode: "Power Outage"
2015	Chicago Fire	Adrian Gish / Trenton Lamont	Episode: "Three Bells"
2015	Chicago P.D.	Adrian Gish / Trenton Lamont	Episode: "A Little Devil Complex"
2015	Texas Rising	Empresario Buckley	3 episodes
2015	Public Morals	Captain Johanson	4 episodes
2015	NCIS	Benson Long	Episode: "Personal Day"
2015	American Horror Story: Hotel	Lieutenant	Episode: "Room Service"
2015–2018	iZombie	Angus McDonough	17 episodes
2016	From Dusk till Dawn: The Series	Ranger Gary Willet	2 episodes
2016–2018	Homeland	General Jamie McClendon	5 episodes
2017	Twin Peaks	Rodney Mitchum	6 episodes
2017	The Orville	Hamelac	Episode: "If the Stars Should Appear"
2017	Spirit Riding Free	Harlan Grayson	Voice; 2 episodes
2017	Dating Game Killer	Detective Jim Hamell	Television film
2021	Nova Vita	Mr. Chinzano	9 episodes
2021	Paper Empire	Konstantin	6 episodes
2022	The Pact	Jay	Episode: "Death is the Only Release"
2025	The Gray House	Bully Lumpkin	
2025	Dark Winds	The Priest	Episode: "Ábidoo'niidę́ę́ (What We Had Been Told)"

=== Video games ===
Year	Title	Role	Notes
2010	Prison Break: The Conspiracy	Theodore "T-Bag" Bagwell	

=== Music videos ===
Year	Title	Artist
2023	"Honky Tonkin' About"	The Reklaws (featuring Drake Milligan)

== Theatre ==
- A Little Night Music – Northwestern University (1977)
- The Ruling Class – Northwestern University (1979)
- The Merchant of Venice – Northwestern University (1979–1980)
- Ties – Chicago (1981)
- Class Enemy – Evanston, Illinois (1981)
- Lakeboat – Chicago (1982)
- The Life and Adventures of Nicholas Nickleby – Chicago (1982)
- Dark of the Moon – Sarasota (1983)
- Life Signals – Sarasota (1983)
- Sherlock Holmes – Sarasota (1983)
- The Philanthropist – New York (1983)
- Savage Amusement – New York (1984)
- Romance – New York (1984)
- The Person I Once Was – Louisville, Kentucky (1984)
- The Very Last Lover of the River Cane – Louisville, Kentucky (1985)
- Available Light – Louisville, Kentucky (1985)
- Groves of Academe – Cluj, Romania (1985)
- A Midsummer Night's Dream – New York (1987)
- Romeo and Juliet – New York (1988)
- The Legend of Oedipus – Williamstown, Massachusetts (1988)
- Les Liaisons Dangereuses – Williamstown, Massachusetts (1988)
- Nebraska – La Jolla (1989)
- Ice Cream With Hot Fudge – New York (1990)
- Bobby, Can You Hear Me? – Waterford, Connecticut (1990)
- Buster Comes Through – Waterford, Connecticut (1990)
- Lake No Bottom – New York (1990)
- Dinosaur Dreams – Waterford, Connecticut (1991)
- Home Grown – Waterford, Connecticut (1991)
- Orestes – Los Angeles (1992)
- Salomé – New York (1992)
- Pal Joey – Boston (1992)
- Sweet Bird of Youth – London (1994)
- Pride's Crossing – San Diego (1997)
- The Summer Moon – Seattle (1998)
