= Mindcage =

- Theatrical release poster
- Directed by: Mauro Borrelli
- Screenplay by: Reggie Keyohara III
- Story by: Mauro Borrelli
- Produced by: Daniel Grodnik; Mitchell Welch
- Starring: Martin Lawrence; Melissa Roxburgh; John Malkovich; Robert Knepper; Jacob Grodnik; Aiden Turner
- Cinematography: E. Gustavo Petersen
- Edited by: Franz Königswieser; James Kondelik
- Music by: Leo Z
- Production company: Boomtown Media Partners
- Distributed by: Lionsgate
- Release date: December 16, 2022
- Running time: 97 minutes
- Country: United States
- Language: English

Mindcage is a 2022 American supernatural mystery thriller film directed by Mauro Borrelli and starring Martin Lawrence, Melissa Roxburgh, John Malkovich, Robert Knepper, Jacob Grodnik and Aiden Turner. The first non-comedy role of Lawrence's acting career, the film was released through VOD and in theatres on December 16, 2022.

The film received mostly negative reviews from critics, although Lawrence's performance received some praise.

== Synopsis ==
When a copycat murderer strikes, Detectives Jake Doyle and Mary Kelly seek help from an incarcerated serial killer called "the Artist", who makes a deal with them to speak to the district attorney to commute his sentence into life in prison. As Mary delves deep into the Artist's brilliant but twisted psyche, she and Jake get lured into a diabolical game of cat and mouse, racing against time to stay one step ahead of both criminals.

== Cast ==
- Martin Lawrence as Jake
- Melissa Roxburgh as Mary
- John Malkovich as The Artist
- Robert Knepper as Lt. Owings
- Neb Chupin as Dr. Loesch
- Jacob Grodnik as Dutch
- Chris Mullinax as Homeless Man
- Ritchie Montgomery as Father Linares
- Nellie Sciutto as Lt. Governor Diaz
- Aiden Turner as Dale
- Cassandra Gava as Voodoo Priestess

== Production ==
Filming occurred in Springdale, Arkansas, and Fayetteville, Arkansas, in August 2021.

That same month, it was announced that SAG-AFTRA had issued a "Do Not Work" notice to the filmmakers due to COVID-19 concerns. The notice was rescinded on August 13, 2021.

== Release ==
The film's first trailer was released on November 7, 2022. The film was released through VOD and in a small number of theatres on December 16, 2022.

== Reception ==
On the review aggregator website Rotten Tomatoes, 18% of 11 critics' reviews are positive, with an average rating of 3.3/10.

Many critics have compared the film unfavourably to The Silence of the Lambs, Seven and Fallen.

In January 2024, the film entered the top 10 movies on Netflix worldwide, attracting 9.1 million viewers in its first week, and amassed 14.7 million hours of viewing time.

In an interview with Fangoria magazine, Lawrence stated that he had been looking to do something different for some time and was "open to the right kind of drama or thriller".
