= Martin Lawrence =

American comedian and actor (born 1965)

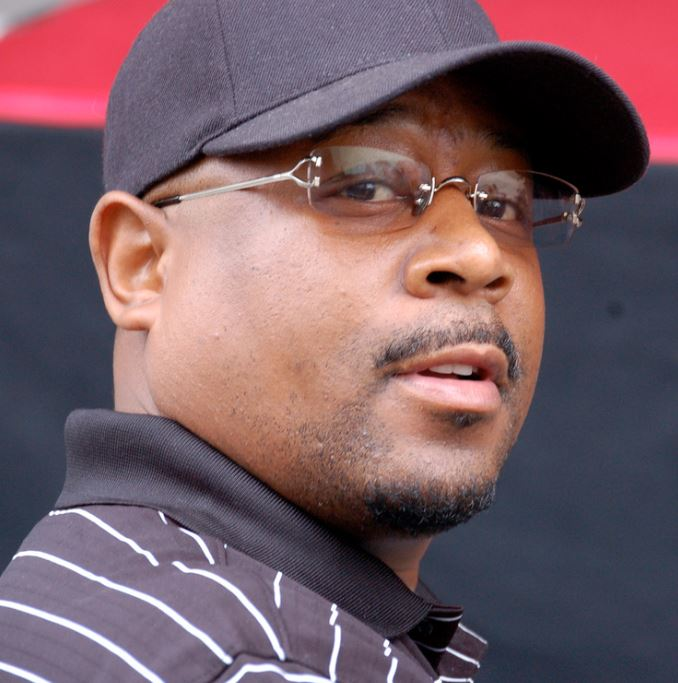
- Lawrence in 2013
- Born: Martin Fitzgerald Lawrence; April 16, 1965 (age 61); Frankfurt, West Germany
- Citizenship: American
- Occupations: Actor, comedian
- Spouses: Patricia Southall (m. 1995; div. 1997) Shamicka Gibbs (m. 2010; div. 2012)
- Children: 3

Comedy career
- Years active: 1987–present
- Medium: Stand-up; television; film
- Genres: Observational comedy; physical comedy; satire; blue comedy
- Subjects: African-American culture; human sexuality; racism; race relations; self-deprecation

Martin Fitzgerald Lawrence (born April 16, 1965) is an American actor and comedian. Lawrence began his career doing comedy shows, including in The Improv. After his first acting role as Maurice Warfield in the sitcom What's Happening Now!! (1987–1988), Lawrence co-created and played the titular character of the Fox television sitcom Martin (1992-1997), which helped catapult him into larger film roles. His first major lead role on the big screen was playing Detective Sergeant Marcus Burnett in the buddy cop action comedy Bad Boys (1995), a role he reprised in three sequels.

Lawrence went on to star in the commercially successful films A Thin Line Between Love and Hate (1996), which marked his directorial debut, Nothing to Lose (1997), Blue Streak (1999), Big Momma's House (2000), Big Momma's House 2 (2006), Wild Hogs (2007), College Road Trip (2008), Death at a Funeral (2010), and Big Mommas: Like Father, Like Son (2011), among others. His voice acting work includes the animated films Open Season (2006) and Sneaks (2025), and the animated television series Kid 'n Play (1990).

== Early life ==
Martin Fitzgerald Lawrence was born on April 16, 1965, in Frankfurt, West Germany. His father, John Lawrence, was serving in the United States Air Force at the time of his birth. Lawrence's first and middle names were after civil rights leader Martin Luther King Jr. and U.S. President John F. Kennedy, respectively. When Lawrence was seven, his father left the military, and the family moved from West Germany back to the United States, settling in the Washington, D.C., area in the town of Landover, Maryland. Lawrence's mother had moved herself and her six children into the troubled King Square housing projects where he would attend Dodge Park Elementary. Following his parents' divorce when he was eight years old, Lawrence rarely saw his father, who was a police officer, serving as the Police Chief for the Franklin D. Roosevelt VA Medical Center in Montrose, New York. His mother, Chlora (née Bailey), worked several jobs, including as a sales representative and cashier at various department stores, to support her family. Small for his age growing up in the projects, Lawrence often engaged in street fights with other kids. He stated that it was his mother and older brothers who kept him out of jail where most of his childhood friends ended up. During his teen years, Lawrence excelled at boxing. While living in Fort Washington, Maryland, Lawrence attended Eleanor Roosevelt High School and Friendly High School, and became a Mid-Atlantic Golden Gloves boxing contender.

== Career ==
In his early days, Lawrence did comedy shows in the Washington, D.C., area and supported himself through odd jobs. Comedian Ritch Shydner saw his act and suggested Lawrence make connections in New York. Lawrence ended up moving to New York City and found his way to the comedy club The Improv. Shortly after appearing at The Imp He did well on the show and made it to the final round, but did not win. However, executives at Columbia Pictures Television saw Martin's performance and offered him the role of Maurice Warfield in What's Happening Now!!; this was his first acting job. Upon cancellation of that show, Lawrence found bit parts in various films and television series. His breakthrough role was as Cee in Do the Right Thing. Other film roles followed, such as House Party, House Party 2, Talkin' Dirty After Dark, and the Eddie Murphy vehicle Boomerang. During this period, entertainment mogul Russell Simmons selected him to host the groundbreaking series Def Comedy Jam on HBO. Def Comedy Jam gave many comedians (including Chris Tucker, Dave Chappelle, Mike Epps, Eddie Griffin, Bernie Mac and Cedric the Entertainer) mainstream exposure.

During his stint with Def Comedy Jam, Lawrence appeared in his own hit series, Martin, which aired on Fox. The show ran from 1992 to 1997 and was an enormous success. Martin was the flagship of Fox's Thursday night line-up, which drew millions of viewers away from NBC's "Must See TV" line-up. He hosted Saturday Night Live on February 19, 1994, where he made crude remarks about women's genitalia and personal hygiene; the offensive portion of the monologue was edited out of NBC reruns and syndicated versions and Lawrence was banned from NBC for a period of time until he received an apology from the President of NBC at the time Warren Littlefield. Martin's ratings continued to skyrocket so much that Fox became more of a contender against NBC and came closer to being considered among the top television networks. In 1995 he acted alongside Will Smith in Bad Boys with wide success.

After Martin ended its run in 1997, Lawrence found work in comedy films. He often starred as the second lead opposite actors including Eddie Murphy, Danny DeVito, and Tim Robbins. Many of his films were blockbusters at the box office, including Nothing to Lose, Life, Blue Streak, Big Momma's House, and Bad Boys II. He also starred in critical and box office failures, including Black Knight and National Security. Regardless, his salary steadily increased to over $10 million per film role. He continued to work in film, with such films as Big Momma's House 2, which opened at No. 1 at the North American box office and grossed almost $28 million its first weekend, and Wild Hogs (2007), in which he played a bored suburbanite seeking adventure on the open road in a biker comedy alongside John Travolta, Tim Allen and William H. Macy.

In 2006, Lawrence appeared on Inside the Actors Studio, during which Lawrence briefly brought back to life some of the characters he had portrayed on Martin. He also appeared in Open Season as the voice of Boog, one of the main characters of the film, which also starred Ashton Kutcher, Debra Messing, and Gary Sinise.

In 2008, Lawrence starred in his first G-rated film, Walt Disney Pictures' College Road Trip, in which he co-starred with Raven-Symoné.

In 2011, Lawrence reprised his role as FBI agent Malcolm Turner in Big Mommas: Like Father, Like Son, the third film in the Big Momma series.

In January 2013, it was announced that Lawrence and Kelsey Grammer were considering pairing up to star in a comedy for Lionsgate Television. Partners, paired the two actors as Chicago lawyers from "vastly different backgrounds who unexpectedly meet in court on the worst day of their lives." The show premiered on August 4, 2014, but was cancelled after one season after receiving poor reviews.

In 2020, Lawrence reprised his role as Detective Marcus Burnett in the third installment of the Bad Boys franchise, Bad Boys for Life, again alongside Will Smith. The film was considered a financial success, grossing $112 million in its first four days of release.

Lawrence starred in his first dramatic role in 2022's Mindcage alongside Melissa Roxburgh and John Malkovich.

On April 20, 2023, Lawrence earned a star on the Hollywood Walk of Fame.

== Personal life ==
=== Relationships and family ===
Lawrence was engaged to actress Lark Voorhies in 1993. He married Miss Virginia USA, Patricia Southall, in 1995. Lawrence and Southall have a daughter, Jasmine Page (born January 15, 1996). They divorced in 1997, and Lawrence began a relationship with Shamicka Gibbs. Lawrence and Gibbs have two daughters, Iyanna Faith (born November 9, 2000) and Amara Trinity (born August 20, 2002). After over ten years together they married on July 10, 2010, at Lawrence's Beverly Hills home. Actors Eddie Murphy and Denzel Washington were among the 120 wedding guests; On April 25, 2012, Lawrence filed for divorce from Gibbs, citing irreconcilable differences and asking for joint legal and physical custody of the children.

Lawrence owns a farm near Purcellville, Virginia. For several years, he owned a large mansion in the Beverly Park community in Beverly Hills, where he wedded Gibbs. However, following their divorce, the property was available for lease at $200,000 per month in June 2012. In 2013, the property was up for sale for $26.5 million, and eventually he sold it for $17.2 million to Bruce Makowsky, buying an Encino, Los Angeles property for $6.63 million.

In May 2025, Lawrence's daughter Jasmine married Eddie Murphy's son, Eric Murphy.

=== Arrests, lawsuits and health problems ===
In July 1995, while on the set filming A Thin Line Between Love and Hate, Lawrence lashed out in a violent rage and was then hospitalized at Cedars-Sinai Medical Center.

On May 8, 1996, he became increasingly erratic and was arrested after he brandished a pistol in the middle of an intersection on Ventura Boulevard in Los Angeles, screaming, "They're trying to kill me!" He was again hospitalized, with his public-relations agent citing exhaustion and dehydration as the reasons for this episode. On July 29, 1996, he tried to take a gun on a flight and received two years probation and a fine. In March 1997, Lawrence was arrested after punching a man in a Hollywood nightclub.

In August 1999, Lawrence slipped into a three-day coma after collapsing from heat exhaustion while jogging in 100 °F (38 °C) heat in preparation for Big Momma's House while wearing heavy clothing and a "plastic suit". He recovered in the hospital after entering a near fatal coma due to a body temperature of 107 °F (42 °C), his breathing assisted by a ventilator.

== Filmography ==
=== Film ===
Year	Title	Role	Notes
1989	Do the Right Thing	Cee	
1990	House Party	Bilal	
1991	L.A. Story	Himself	Uncredited cameo
1991	Talkin' Dirty After Dark	Terry Lumbar	
1991	House Party 2	Bilal	
1992	Boomerang	Tyler Hawkins	
1994	You So Crazy	Himself	Stand-up film; also Executive producer and writer
1995	Bad Boys	Detective Marcus Burnett	
1996	A Thin Line Between Love and Hate	Darnell Wright	Also director, Narrator, executive producer, writer and music supervisor
1997	Nothing to Lose	Terrence "T-Paul" Paul Davidson	
1998	Jackie Chan: My Story	Himself	Documentary film
1999	Life	Claude Banks	
1999	Blue Streak	Miles Logan/Detective Malone	
2000	Big Momma's House	Malcolm Turner/Big Momma	Also executive producer
2001	What's the Worst That Could Happen?	Kevin Caffrey	Also executive producer
2001	Black Knight	Jamal Walker/Skywalker	Also executive producer
2002	Martin Lawrence Live: Runteldat	Himself	Stand-up film; Also executive producer and writer
2003	National Security	Earl Montgomery	Also executive producer
2003	Bad Boys II	Detective Marcus Burnett	
2005	Rebound	Coach Roy McCormick/Preacher Don	Also executive producer
2006	Big Momma's House 2	Malcolm Turner/Big Momma	Also executive producer
2006	Open Season	Boog	Voice only
2006	Boog and Elliot's Midnight Bun Run	Boog	Short film, Voice only
2007	Wild Hogs	Bobby Davis	
2008	Welcome Home Roscoe Jenkins	RJ Stevens/Roscoe Jenkins Jr.	
2008	College Road Trip	Chief James Porter	
2008	Tropic Thunder	The Dude	Cameo
2010	Death at a Funeral	Ryan Barnes	
2011	Big Mommas: Like Father, Like Son	Malcolm Turner/Big Momma	
2016	Martin Lawrence: Doin' Time	Himself	Stand-up film; Also writer
2019	The Beach Bum	Captain Wack	
2020	Bad Boys for Life	Detective Marcus Burnett	
2022	Mindcage	Jake Doyle	
2024	Bad Boys: Ride or Die	Detective Marcus Burnett	Also executive producer
2025	Sneaks	JB	Voice only

=== Television ===
Year	Title	Role	Notes
1987–1988	What's Happening Now!!	Maurice Warfield	22 episodes
1989	A Little Bit Strange	Sydney Masterson	Unsold pilot
1990	Kid 'n Play	Wiz, Hurbie	Voice
1990	Hammer, Slammer, & Slade	Willie	Television film
1991	Private Times	Mike	Unaired pilot
1992–1993	Def Comedy Jam	Himself (host)	
1992–1997	Martin	Martin Payne and other various characters	132 episodes
1994	Saturday Night Live	Himself (host)	Episode: "Martin Lawrence/Crash Test Dummies"
2010–2011	Love That Girl!	—N/a	Executive producer
2012	Untitled Martin Lawrence / CBS Sitcom	Ray Barker	Unsold pilot
2014	The Soul Man	Crazy Rudy	Episode: "All the Way Live"
2014	Partners	Marcus Jackson	10 episodes
2024	Knuckles	Detective Marcus Burnett	Episode: "Don't Ever Say I Wasn't There For You"; archive footage from Bad Boys
2025	Demascus	Uncle Forty	3 episodes
2026	The Varnell Hill Show	Mr. Dupree	Executive producer: special guest star

== Discography ==
Years	Album	Chart positions	
Years	Album	US	US Hip-Hop
1993	Martin Lawrence Live Talkin' Shit	76	10
1995	Funk It	–	35

== Awards and nominations ==
- Blockbuster Entertainment Award
  - nominated with Eddie Murphy for Favorite Comedy Team (2000) for the film Life
  - nominated for Favorite Actor (2001) for the film Big Momma's House
- NAACP Image Award
  - won Outstanding Lead Actor in a Comedy Series (1995) for the series Martin
  - won Outstanding Lead Actor in a Comedy Series (1996) for the series Martin
  - nominated for Outstanding Lead Actor in a Comedy Series (1997) for the series Martin
  - won Outstanding Actor in a Motion Picture (2025) for the film Bad Boys: Ride or Die
- Kids' Choice Award
  - nominated for Favorite Television Actor (1995) for the series Martin
  - nominated for Favorite Television Actor (1996) for the series Martin
  - nominated for Favorite Movie Actor (2001) for the film Big Momma's House
- MTV Movie Award
  - nominated with Will Smith for Best On-Screen Duo (1996) for the film Bad Boys
  - nominated for the film Big Momma's House
  - nominated with Will Smith for Best On-Screen Team (2003) for the film Bad Boys II
- ShoWest – Male Star of Tomorrow (1995)
- Teen Choice Award – nominated for Wipeout Scene of the Summer (2000) for the film Big Momma's House
- BET Comedy Award – won Icon Comedy Award (2005)
- AMDA - received Lifetime Achievement Award and Honorary Masters Degree (2025)
