= Melissa Roxburgh =

Canadian actress (born 1992)

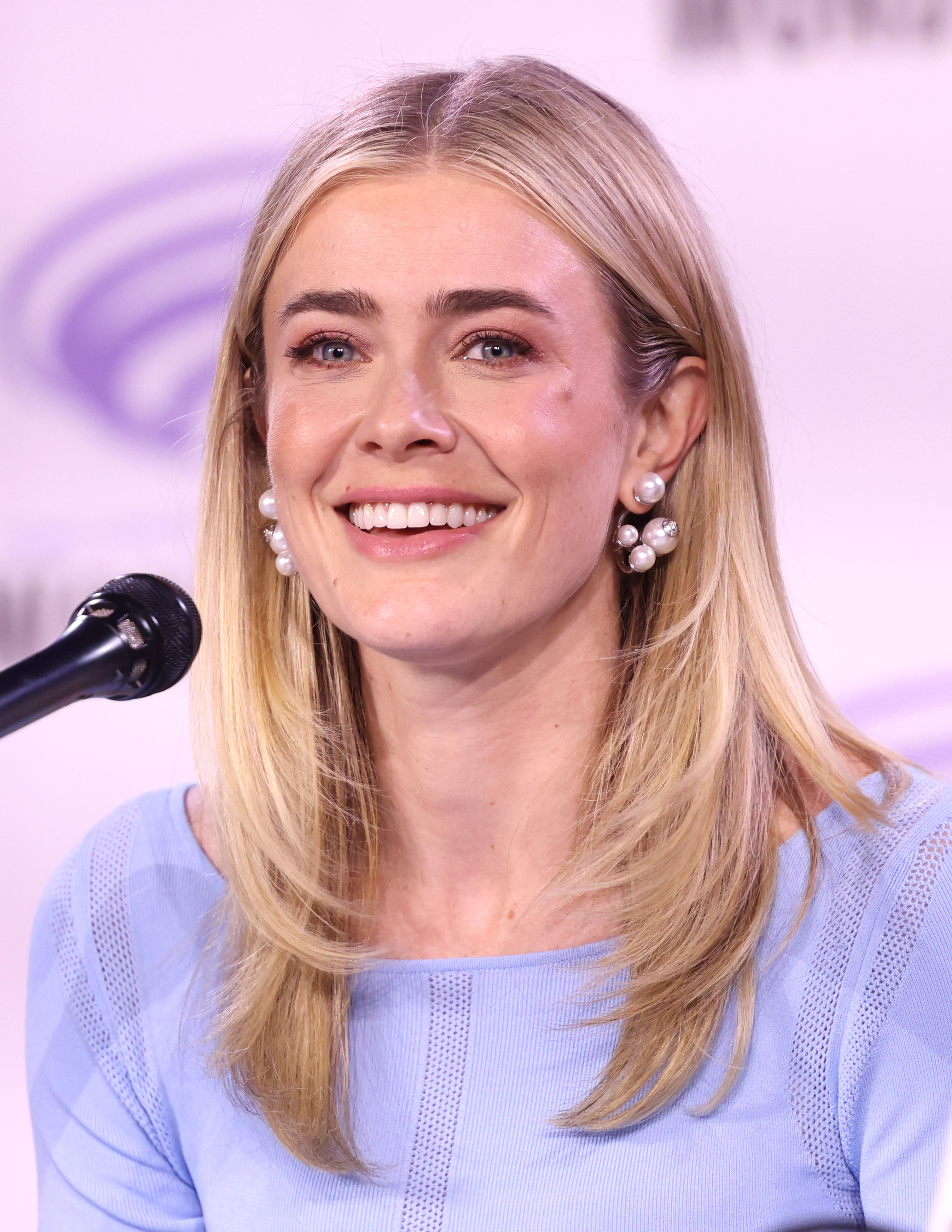
- Roxburgh in 2025
- Born: December 10, 1992 (age 33)
- Citizenship: Canadian
- Occupation: Actress
- Years active: 2011–present
- Mother: Shelley Roxburgh

Melissa Roxburgh (born December 10, 1992) is a Canadian actress. She is known for her roles in Diary of a Wimpy Kid: Rodrick Rules (2011) and Diary of a Wimpy Kid: Dog Days (2012), Supernatural (2014), The Marine 4: Moving Target (2015), Star Trek Beyond (2016), Valor (2017–2018), Mindcage (2022), and as Michaela Stone in the NBC/Netflix science fiction drama series Manifest (2018–2023). From January 2025 to May 2026, she led the television series The Hunting Party as FBI agent Rebecca "Bex" Henderson.

== Early life ==
Roxburgh's father is a pastor and her mother is British former professional tennis player Shelley Roxburgh. Her younger sister is also an actress. After graduating from high school, Roxburgh began pursuing acting in Vancouver. Roxburgh is an alumna of the William Esper Studio.

== Career ==
She landed her first major role in Diary of a Wimpy Kid: Rodrick Rules as Rachel. She went on to also appear in the second sequel of Diary of a Wimpy Kid, Dog Days, but as a different character, Heather Hills. Her other work in films has included Big Time Movie, Jeni in Leprechaun: Origins, and Ensign Syl in Star Trek Beyond. Her television work has included the Supernatural spinoff, Bloodlines, and Thea in The CW's drama series, Valor.

Roxburgh portrayed Michaela Stone in the NBC series Manifest, which premiered on September 24, 2018. After three seasons on NBC, Netflix produced the fourth and final season.

In 2022, Roxburgh starred as detective Mary Kelly in the serial killer movie Mindcage, alongside Martin Lawrence and John Malkovich.

== Personal life ==
Roxburgh has a passion for travel. Growing up, her family visited Africa, Europe, and South America, which began Roxburgh's interest in social justice issues.

== Filmography ==
=== Film ===
| Year | Title | Role | Notes |
|---|---|---|---|
| 2011 | Diary of a Wimpy Kid: Rodrick Rules | Rachel Lewis | |
| 2012 | Diary of a Wimpy Kid: Dog Days | Heather Hills | |
| 2012 | Big Time Movie | Princess | |
| 2014 | Leprechaun: Origins | Jeni | |
| 2015 | The Marine 4: Moving Target | Olivia Tanis | |
| 2016 | Star Trek Beyond | Ensign Syl | |
| 2016 | 2BR02B: To Be or Naught to Be | Leora Duncan | |
| 2016 | Lost Solace | Azaria | |
| 2018 | In God I Trust | Mya Matheson | Independent film |
| 2020 | I Still Believe | Heather Henning | |
| 2022 | Mindcage | Mary Kelly | |

=== Television ===
| Year | Title | Role | Notes |
|---|---|---|---|
| 2012–2013 | Arrow | Blake | 2 episodes |
| 2012, 2014 | Supernatural | Lila Taylor | Episode: "Time After Time" |
| 2012, 2014 | Supernatural | Violet Duval | Episode: "Bloodlines" |
| 2014 | The Tomorrow People | Talia | Episode: "Superhero" |
| 2015 | Sorority Murder | Carly | Television film |
| 2016 | Legends of Tomorrow | Betty Seaver | Episode: "Night of the Hawk" |
| 2017–2018 | Valor | Thea | Main role |
| 2017 | Travelers | Carrie | Episode: "17 Minutes" |
| 2018–2023 | Manifest | Michaela Stone | Main role, also directed episode: "Lift/Drag" |
| 2023 | Quantum Leap | Lieutenant Ellen Grier | Episode: "This Took Too Long!" |
| 2024–2025 | Tracker | Dr. Dory Shaw | S1, E11: "Beyond the Campus Walls" S2, E19: "Rules of the Game" |
| 2025–2026 | The Hunting Party | Rebecca "Bex" Henderson | Main role |
