= Wentworth Miller =

American actor (born 1972)

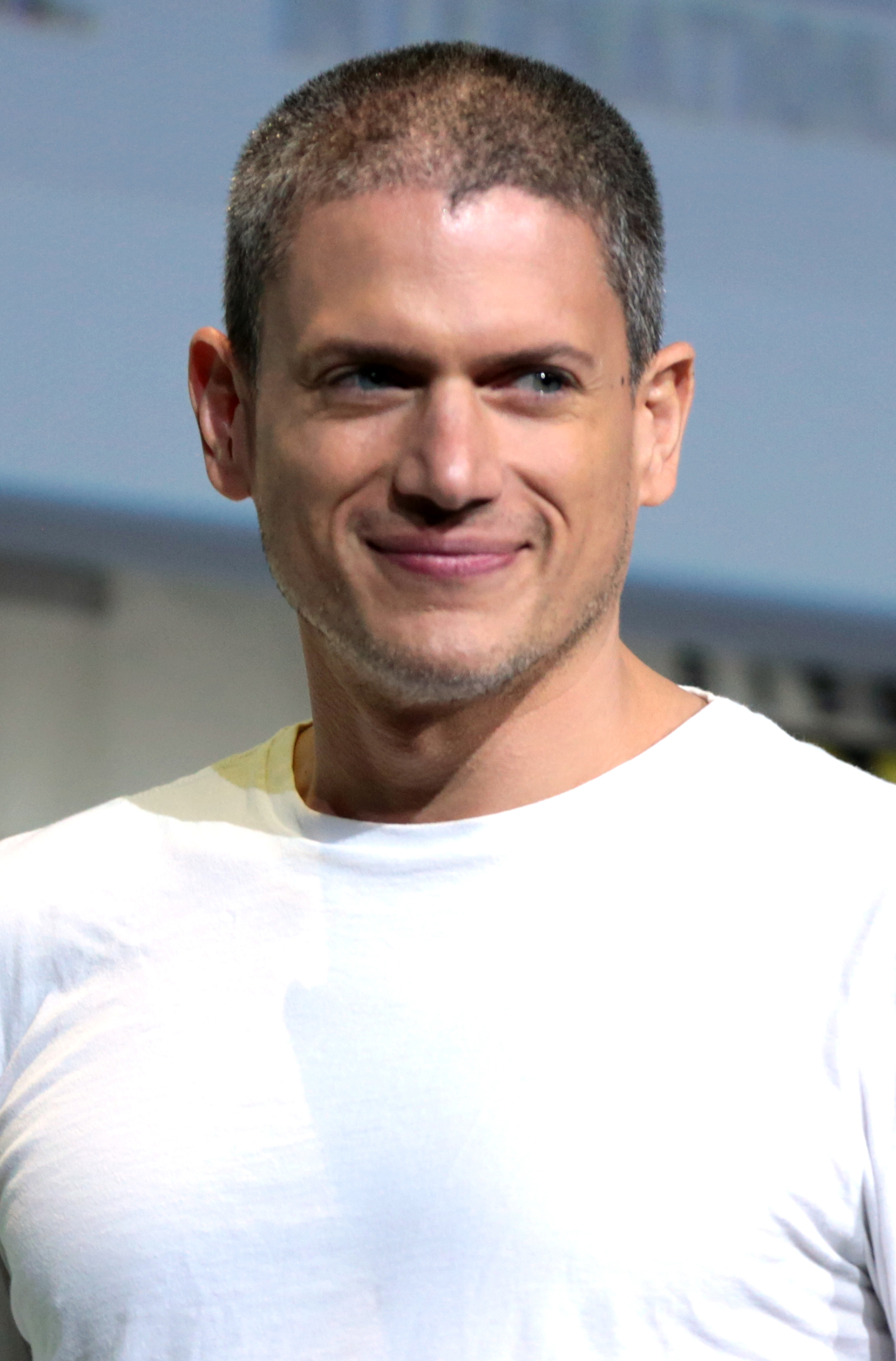
- Miller at the 2016 San Diego Comic-Con
- Born: Wentworth Earl Miller III; June 2, 1972 (age 54); Chipping Norton, Oxfordshire, England
- Other name: Ted Foulke
- Citizenship: United States; United Kingdom
- Education: Princeton University (BA)
- Occupation: Actor
- Years active: 1998–present

Wentworth Earl Miller III (born June 2, 1972) is an American actor known for playing the role of Michael Scofield in Prison Break, for which he received a nomination for the Golden Globe Award for Best Actor – Television Series Drama in 2005. He made his screenwriting debut with the 2013 thriller film Stoker. In 2014, he began playing Leonard Snart / Captain Cold in a recurring role on The Flash before becoming a main series regular on the spin-off first season, Legends of Tomorrow.

== Early life ==
Miller was born in Chipping Norton, Oxfordshire, England, to American parents. His mother, Roxann (née Palm), is a special education teacher, and his father, Wentworth E. Miller II, is a lawyer and teacher, who was studying at the University of Oxford on a Rhodes Scholarship at the time of Miller's birth. Miller said in 2003 that his father is black and his mother is white. His father is of African-American, Jamaican, German, and English ancestry; his mother is of Rusyn, Swedish, French, Dutch, Syrian, and Lebanese ancestry. He has two sisters, Leigh and Gillian.

Miller's family moved to Park Slope, Brooklyn, when he was a year old. He attended Midwood High School in Brooklyn, and graduated from Princeton University in 1995 with a BA in English after completing a 116-page long senior thesis, titled "Doubling and the Identity Construct in Charlotte Perkins Gilman's 'The Yellow Wallpaper,' Jean Rhys's Wide Sargasso Sea, and Charlotte Bronte's Jane Eyre", under the supervision of Gina Dent. While at Princeton, he performed with the a cappella group the Princeton Tigertones and was a member of the Quadrangle Club and the Colonial Club.

== Career ==
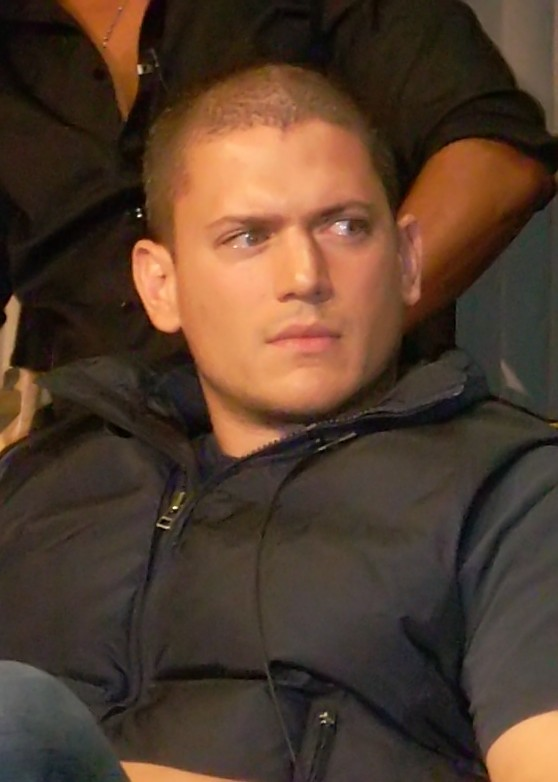
Miller in October 2008.

In 1995, Miller relocated to Los Angeles to pursue an acting career. He has stated that his rocky road to stardom "was a long time in the coming and there were a lot of upsets and a lot of failures and roadblocks, but I couldn't walk away from it. I needed it like I needed air, it was just something I had to do." Miller's first TV appearance was as student-turned-sea monster Gage Petronzi on Buffy the Vampire Slayer ("Go Fish", 1998).

Miller's first starring role was in 2002 as the sensitive, introverted David Scott in ABC's mini-series Dinotopia. After appearing in a few minor television roles, he moved on to co-star in the 2003 film The Human Stain, playing the younger version of the Anthony Hopkins character, Coleman Silk. He identified strongly with the core dilemma of the movie, about a black man who chooses to "pass" as white. Miller worked extensively on the role, not only in researching Anthony Hopkins, but by embarking on a four-month regimen to accurately portray Silk as a boxer. Also in 2003, he had a minor role in the film Underworld, playing a doctor and friend of the character Michael Corvin.

In 2005, Miller was cast as Michael Scofield in Fox Network's television drama Prison Break. He played the role of a gifted structural engineer who created an elaborate scheme to help his brother, Lincoln Burrows (Dominic Purcell), escape death row after being found guilty of a crime he did not commit. His character had a full upper body (front and back) tattoo. Covering both the front of Miller's torso and his back, along with both arms from shoulders to wrists, the special effects for the tattoo took over four hours to apply. His performance in the show earned him a 2005 Golden Globe Award nomination for Best Actor in a Dramatic Series. The show was finished in 2009 after four seasons, but a new nine-episode fifth season was released April 4, 2017, with Miller reprising his role.

Miller appeared in two Mariah Carey music videos, "It's Like That" as a party guest and "We Belong Together" as her love interest. Director Brett Ratner, who directed the pilot episode of Prison Break, was also signed on to direct the two Carey videos. Ratner decided to use Miller in the videos as well.

In addition, Miller guest-starred in the Season 11 premiere of Law & Order: Special Victims Unit as Detective Nate Kendall, a detective from Precinct 24 of the New York City Police Department. He also featured in Resident Evil: Afterlife, the fourth film in the commercially successful Resident Evil film series based on the video game series of the same name; Miller plays Chris Redfield, one of the protagonists of the video game series.

Miller wrote the screenplay for the film Stoker, as well as a prequel to Stoker, Uncle Charlie. He used the pseudonym Ted Foulke, later explaining, "I just wanted the scripts to sink or swim on their own." Miller's script was voted to the 2010 "Black List" of the 10 best unproduced screenplays then making the rounds in Hollywood. The film is about a teenage girl who must deal with a mysterious uncle following the death of her father. Miller described it as a "horror film, a family drama and a psychological thriller". Although influenced by Bram Stoker's Dracula, Miller has clarified that Stoker is not a vampire story. Hitchcock's Shadow of a Doubt also influenced the film but only as a jumping-off point, from which the story takes a different direction. Park Chan-wook directed, with stars Mia Wasikowska as the teenager, Nicole Kidman as the mother, and Matthew Goode as the uncle. The film was released in 2013, and received generally positive reviews from critics.

In July 2014, it was announced that Miller had joined the cast of The CW superhero series The Flash in a recurring role as Leonard Snart / Captain Cold. He made his first appearance in the fourth episode of the first season, and reprised his role on Legends of Tomorrow. These shows reunited him with his Prison Break co-star Dominic Purcell, who portrayed Mick Rory / Heat Wave. Miller exited Legends of Tomorrow as a series regular at the end of season one, but signed a contract with Warner Bros. TV to continue portraying Snart simultaneously on multiple shows in the Arrowverse.

Miller wrote the screenplay for the 2016 horror film The Disappointments Room, produced by Voltage Pictures and Killer Films. The film received negative reviews from critics. He is reportedly in negotiations to write the screenplay adaptation of the novel The Story of Edgar Sawtelle by David Wroblewski which is set to be produced by Oprah Winfrey and Tom Hanks among others.

Miller came out as gay in 2013, and in 2020 announced that he was no longer interested in portraying straight characters in film or television, and thus would not participate in a sixth season of Prison Break if it were produced.

In 2023, the audiobook for the 1995 book Prayers for Bobby was released on Audible, narrated by Miller. In 2024, it was reported that Miller will reunite with his Prison Break co-star, Dominic Purcell, for a new hostage recovery drama called Snatchback.

== Personal life ==
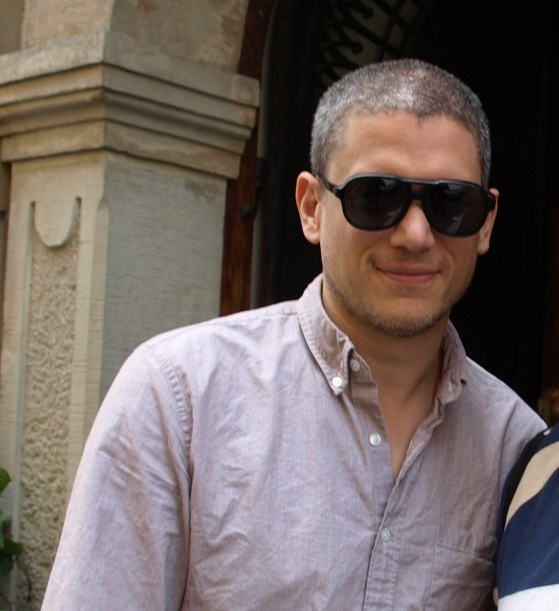
Miller in 2015

Miller lives in Vancouver, British Columbia. He holds American citizenship by virtue of his birth in the United Kingdom to American parents.

In 2007, Miller denied to InStyle magazine that he was gay. However, he came out as gay in August 2013, when he posted a letter on GLAAD's website declining an invitation to attend the Saint Petersburg International Film Festival because he felt "deeply troubled" by the Russian government's treatment of its gay citizens (referring to the Russian LGBT propaganda law, enacted the previous June, which banned "propaganda of nontraditional sexual relations"). Miller wrote that he "cannot in good conscience participate in a celebratory occasion hosted by a country where people like myself are being systematically denied their basic right to live and love openly".

At the 2013 Human Rights Campaign Dinner in Seattle, Washington, Miller said he had attempted suicide multiple times as a teenager before coming out as gay. He stated: "When someone asked me if that was a cry for help, I said no, because I told no one. You only cry for help if you believe there's help to cry for." He discussed struggling in Hollywood as a closeted actor, and talked about how his involvement in the ManKind Project helped him learn about brotherhood, sisterhood, and being part of a community.

On October 17, 2016, Active Minds, a mental health charity, announced that Miller would be an ambassador for the organization. In a 2016 Facebook post, he revealed that he "[had] struggled with depression since childhood. It's a battle that's cost [him] time, opportunities, relationships, and a thousand sleepless nights." He made the post in reaction to a meme of himself that joked about his weight gain in 2010. Miller said that his weight gain was due to him finding comfort in food as he was suicidal. Near the end of the post, he provided links for organizations such as the National Suicide Prevention Lifeline and Active Minds. Wentworth revealed he had been diagnosed with autism "a year ago" on July 27, 2021. He posted on Instagram: "This isn't something I'd change ... immediately being autistic is central to who I am. To everything I've achieved/articulated."

== Filmography ==
=== Film ===
==== As actor ====
Year	Title	Role	Notes
2000	Romeo and Juliet	Paris	Direct-to-video
2001	Room 302	Server No. 1	Short film
2003	The Human Stain	Young Coleman Silk	
2003	Underworld	Dr. Adam Lockwood	
2005	The Confession	The Prisoner/Tom	Short film
2005	Stealth	EDI	Voice role
2009	Blood Creek	German soldier	Uncredited
2010	Resident Evil: Afterlife	Chris Redfield	
2014	The Loft	Luke Seacord	
2015	2 Hours 2 Vegas	Guy in rally car	Short film

==== As screenwriter ====
Year	Title	Notes
2013	Stoker	Credited as Ted Foulke
2016	The Disappointments Room	

=== As producer ===
Year	Title	Notes
2013	Stoker	Co-producer

=== Television ===
Year	Title	Role	Notes
1998	Buffy the Vampire Slayer	Gage Petronzi	Episode: "Go Fish"
1999–2000	Time of Your Life	Nelson	3 episodes
2000	Popular	Adam Rothschild-Ryan	2 episodes
2000	ER	Mike Palmieri	Episode: "Homecoming"
2002	Dinotopia	David Scott	Lead role; 3 episodes
2005	Joan of Arcadia	Ryan Hunter	2 episodes
2005–2009; 2017	Prison Break	Michael Scofield	Lead role
2005	Ghost Whisperer	Sgt. Paul Adams	Episode: "Pilot"
2009	Family Guy	Jock No. 4 Popular Kid No. 2	Voice role, Episode: "Stew-Roids"
2009	Prison Break: The Final Break	Michael Scofield	Television film
2009, 2019–2021	Law & Order: Special Victims Unit	Detective Nate Kendall; ADA Isaiah Holmes	Episode: "Unstable" "Murdered at a Bad Address" "The Long Arm of the Witness"
2011	House	Benjamin Byrd	Episode: "Charity Case"
2013	Young Justice	Slade Wilson / Deathstroke	Voice role, Episode: "The Fix"
2014–2019	The Flash	Leonard Snart / Captain Cold; Leo Snart / Citizen Cold	Recurring role; 14 episodes (seasons 1–4 & 6)
2015	Superhero Fight Club	Captain Cold	Short promo video
2016–2018, 2021	Legends of Tomorrow	Leonard Snart / Captain Cold; Leo Snart / Citizen Cold	Main role (season 1), Recurring role (seasons 2–3), Guest role (season 7); 23 episodes
2019	Batwoman	Leonard Snart (Earth-74)	Voice role; Episode: "Crisis on Infinite Earths: Part Two"
2019	Madam Secretary	Senator Mark Hanson	Recurring role; 9 episodes (season 6)

=== Video games ===
Year	Title	Role	Notes
2010	Prison Break: The Conspiracy	Michael Scofield	Voice role

=== Music videos ===
Year	Song title	Artist
2005	"It's Like That"	Mariah Carey
2005	"We Belong Together"	Mariah Carey

== Awards and nominations ==
Year	Award	Category	Work	Result
2004	Black Reel Award	Best Actor	The Human Stain	Nominated
2004	Black Reel Award	Best Breakthrough Performance	The Human Stain	Nominated
2005	Golden Globe Award	Best Performance by an Actor in a TV Series – Drama	Prison Break	Nominated
2005	Saturn Award	Best Actor on Television	Prison Break	Nominated
2006	Gold Derby Award	Breakthrough Performer of the Year	Prison Break	Nominated
2006	Teen Choice Award	Choice TV Actor	Prison Break	Nominated
2006	Teen Choice Award	Choice TV Breakout Star	Prison Break	Nominated
2007	Bravo Otto	Best Male TV Star	Prison Break	2nd place
2007	Teen Choice Award	Choice TV Actor: Drama	Prison Break	Nominated
2008	Teen Choice Award	Choice TV Actor: Action Adventure	Prison Break	Nominated
2013	Fright Meter Award	Best Screenplay	Stoker	Nominated
2013	International Online Cinema Awards	Best Original Screenplay	Stoker	Nominated
2014	Fangoria Chainsaw Award	Best Screenplay	Stoker	2nd place
2015	Saturn Award	Best Guest Starring Role on Television	The Flash	Won
2017	Teen Choice Award	Choice TV Actor: Action Adventure	Prison Break	Nominated
