= Prison Break: The Conspiracy =

2010 video game

- European cover featuring protagonists Lincoln Burrows & Michael Scofield
- Developer: ZootFly
- Publisher: Deep Silver
- Platforms: Microsoft Windows, PlayStation 3, Xbox 360
- Release: EU: March 26, 2010; NA: March 30, 2010; NA: April 1, 2010 (X360); AU: April 12, 2010
- Genre: Action-adventure
- Modes: Single-player, multiplayer

Prison Break: The Conspiracy is an action-adventure video game based on the first season of the Fox television series Prison Break, released for Microsoft Windows, Xbox 360 and PlayStation 3. Many cast members reprise their roles.

== Plot ==
Prison Break: The Conspiracy is based on the events of the first season of Fox's convict drama. However, rather than playing as the main character Michael Scofield, players instead take control of Tom Paxton, an agent with the covert organization The Company, led by Jack Mannix, who must go undercover as a prisoner within Fox River State Penitentiary in order to ensure that the falsely incarcerated Lincoln Burrows be executed in the electric chair. The game is split into nine chapters, all of which represent a part of the TV series.

== Release ==
The game was released in Germany on March 19, 2010; through the rest of Europe one week later; in North America on March 30 for Windows and PS3, on April 1 for Xbox 360; and in Australia on April 12. The game had been in development for PlayStation 3 and Xbox 360 for release in February 2009, but was canceled when Brash Entertainment closed. However, ZootFly continued the development and self-funded the project for 13 months. Once the game was nearly finished, it was acquired by a new publisher Deep Silver.

== Reception ==
Reception

Aggregate score
Aggregator	Score		
Aggregator	PC	PS3	Xbox 360
Metacritic	47/100	42/100	40/100

Review scores
Publication	Score		
Publication	PC	PS3	Xbox 360
Eurogamer	N/A	N/A	3/10
GameSpot	2.5/10	2.5/10	2.5/10
GameZone	N/A	N/A	3.5/10
IGN	N/A	3.5/10	3.5/10
Official Xbox Magazine (UK)	N/A	N/A	3/10
Official Xbox Magazine (US)	N/A	N/A	4.5/10
PC Gamer (US)	60%	N/A	N/A
PC Zone	35%	N/A	N/A
PlayStation: The Official Magazine	N/A	1.5/5	N/A
VideoGamer.com	N/A	4/10	4/10
The Daily Telegraph	N/A	N/A	2/10

The game received "generally unfavorable reviews" on all platforms according to the review aggregation website Metacritic. The Daily Telegraph described the Xbox 360 version as "an abject failure on all counts".
