= Marina Benedict =

American actress

- Occupation: Actress
- Years active: 1998–present

Marina Benedict is an American actress best known for her role in Flesh and Bone as Toni Cannava; Prison Break: Resurrection as Emily "A&W" Blake; Gotham as Cherry; ER as Lois Landry; Torchwood: Miracle Day as Charlotte Wills; and Burn Notice as Col. Oksana Zhirkov.

== Career ==
Benedict was the lead singer in BMG's pop group 5 NY that toured throughout Europe and received a Billboard Top 40 hit in Germany.

== Personal life ==
Benedict attended the Cornish College of the Arts. Benedict became an instructor at the American Musical and Dramatic Academy in 2003. She is the Co-Chair of the Dance Department.

== Filmography ==
=== Film ===
Year	Title	Role	Notes
2006	In Memory of Me	Kristen	Short
2008	Dark Streets	Dancer	
2009	Death in Charge	Baby Sitter / Death	Short
2010	Not Your Time	Dancing Angel	Short
2011	Spells	Luisa	Video short
2012	Sheldon Remains	Chevy Wood	Short
2014	Locker 13	Rachel	Segment: "Story #4"
2016	Losing in Love	Amber	
2017	In Vino	Magdalen	Completed

=== Television ===
Year	Title	Role	Notes
1998	5NY - Heiß auf Erfolg	Marina	TV film
1999	Wasteland	Heather	"Indian Summer"
2000–01	Nikki	Luna	Recurring role
2001	18 Wheels of Justice	Felicia	"Come Back, Little Diva"
2001	An American Town	Salem Dunne	TV film
2002	Angel	Kim	"Sleep Tight"
2002	Father Lefty	Katie	TV film
2005	Without a Trace	Svetlana	"Lone Star"
2007	Ghost Whisperer	Mary Billings	"The Underneath"
2008	ER	Lois Landry	"Tandem Repeats"
2009	Southland	Shawna	"Unknown Trouble", "Sally in the Alley"
2010	Desperate Housewives	Seamstress	"We All Deserve to Die"
2010	CSI: Miami	Hannah Beckstrom	"Reality Kills"
2011	Torchwood	Charlotte Wills	Recurring role
2013	True Blood	Veronica	"The Sun"
2013	Burn Notice	Colonel Oksana Zhirkov	"Exit Plan"
2013	Perception	Zoey	"Asylum"
2014	Bones	Ingrid Magnusson	"The Master in the Slop"
2015	Criminal Minds	Ellen Clark	"The Night Watch"
2015	Flesh and Bone	Toni Cannava	TV miniseries
2017	Prison Break: Resurrection	Emily "A&W" Blake	TV miniseries
2017	Gotham	Cherry	Recurring role
