= Michael Scofield =

Prison Break character

- Prison Break character
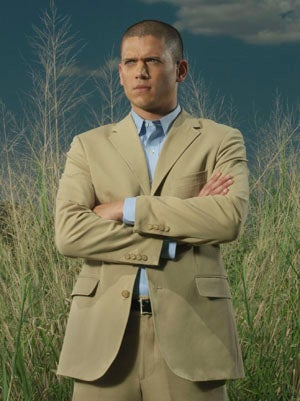
- Promotional still of Wentworth Miller as Michael Scofield in Season 2
- First appearance: "Pilot" (2005)
- Last appearance: "Behind the Eyes" (2017)
- Created by: Paul Scheuring
- Portrayed by: Wentworth Miller; Dylan Minnette (young)
- Voiced by: Wentworth Miller (video game)

In-universe information
- Aliases: Phineas McClintock; Wayne Merrick; Michael Crane; Michael Angelo; Officer Mathers; Kevin Freeling; Kaniel Outis
- Occupation: Structural engineer
- Family: Aldo Burrows (father); Christina Rose Scofield (mother); Lincoln Burrows (brother); Lincoln "L. J." Burrows Jr. (nephew); Michael "Mike" Scofield Jr. (son via Sara)
- Spouses: Sara Tancredi; Nika Volek (unconsummated)

Michael J. Scofield is a fictional character and one of the main protagonists of the American television series Prison Break. He is portrayed by Wentworth Miller.

== Character development ==
Michael was conceived after Prison Break creator Paul Scheuring developed an idea from another producer, about a man who deliberately imprisons himself to break somebody out. From the initial proposal, Scheuring then justified the character and story by making him a structural engineer who worked at the architecture firm that had access to the prison's blueprints.

Miller said, "First season, I think part of my challenge was to create, hopefully, a compelling character. But at the same time, there were so many things I could never show, because standing next to Abruzzi or T-Bag or Bellick, I could not afford to be vulnerable. I could not afford to crack a smile." In the second season, the character shows a wider range of emotions as Miller explains, "He's going to have some lighter, more colorful shades... now that he's off with his brother, around whom I think Michael is willing to show a side of himself that he's not with others, there's a lot more that I can explore."

=== Background and motivation ===
Michael deliberately goes to prison to break out his older brother, Lincoln Burrows (Dominic Purcell), before his execution for a crime he did not commit. The storyline of the first season revolves around the two brothers and Michael's plan to help Lincoln escape his death sentence. Later seasons detail their life on the run and their quest for the truth behind Lincoln's imprisonment.

=== Personality and traits ===
Michael has been clinically diagnosed with low latent inhibition, a condition in which his brain is more open than most people's to incoming stimuli in the surrounding environment. He is unable to block out peripheral information and instead processes every aspect and detail of any given stimulus. This, combined with a high IQ, theoretically makes him a creative genius.

In flashbacks, the child version of Michael is played by Dylan Minnette.

=== Tattoo ===
Scofield in Season 5.

The tattoo, which covers the entire upper body of Michael, is featured extensively in the first season. It is focal to the plot, with the prison blueprints, and various details of the plan for escape from prison and from the country.

Designed by Tom Berg and created by Tinsley Transfers, the tattoo took around five hours to be applied onto Miller. When the entire tattoo does not need to be shown, for example, in scenes where the actor is wearing a T-shirt, only the forearm pieces of the tattoo are applied. Wentworth Miller has commented that interviews frequently include questions about the tattoo.

== Reception ==
For most of the first season of the show, Miller's limited range of facial expressions generated mixed reception. For the first season, Miller was nominated for a Golden Globe. The Washington Post criticized this performance as being "the most oppressive" and how "the actor apparently thinks it looks cool for him always to be scanning the surroundings". Entertainment Weekly recognized the actor's domination of screen time by saying that "it's Miller's show" and on his performance, they stated that his "Michael Scofield has the silky voice of a sociopath, the resigned stance of a long-distance runner, and the deadpan delivery of Macaulay Culkin at his Uncle Buck best." The New York Times commented that although Miller does not show a wide range of emotion, "he projects an unflappable determination that confounds his fellow prisoners".
