= List of horror films of 2007 =

Title	Director	Cast	Country	Notes
9 Lives of Mara	Balaji K. Kumar	Jennifer Gimenez, Patrick Bauchau, Pollyanna McIntosh	United States	
13 Hours in a Warehouse	Dav Kaufman	Cody Lyman, Rachel Grubb, Meisha Johnson	United States	
28 Weeks Later	Juan Carlos Fresnadillo	Robert Carlyle, Rose Byrne, Jeremy Renner	Spain; United Kingdom; United States	
30 Days of Night	David Slade	Josh Hartnett, Melissa George	United States	
100 Tears	Marcus Koch	Georgia Chris, Joe Davison, Raine Brown, Jack Amos	United States	
1408	Mikael Håfström	John Cusack, Samuel L. Jackson, Mary McCormack	United States	
AVH: Alien vs. Hunter	Scott Harper	Dedee Pfeiffer, Kevin Kazakoff, Wittly Jourdan	United States	
Aliens vs. Predator: Requiem	Greg Strause, Colin Strause	Reiko Aylesworth, Steven Pasquale, Shareeka Epps	United States	
Amateur Porn Star Killer	Shane Ryan	Jan Gould, Michiko Jimenez, Shane Ryan	United States	
American Zombie	Grace Lee	Austin Basis, Kasi Brown, Alice Amter	United States	
Apartment 1303	Ataru Oikawa	Noriko Nakagoshi, Arata Furuta, Yuka Itaya	Japan	
The Appeared	Paco Cabezas	Pablo Cedrón, Leonora Balcarce, Héctor Bidonde	Argentina; Spain; Sweden	
B.T.K.	Michael Feifer	Kane Hodder, Amy Lyndon, Daniel Bonjour	United States	
Beneath the Surface	Blake Reigle	Dominique Geisendorff, Brett Lawrence, Tiffany Fox	United States	
Beverly Hills Massacre	Alec Cizak	Alicia Klein, Gray George	United States	
Big Bad Wolf	Lance W. Dreesen	Sarah Aldrich, Trevor Duke, Christopher Shyer	United States	
Black Swarm	David Winning	Jayne Heitmeyer, Robert Englund, Rebecca Windheim	Canada	
Black Water	Andrew Traucki, David Nerlich	Fiona Press, Maeve Dermody, Ben Oxenbould	Australia	
Blood and Chocolate	Katja von Garnier	Agnes Bruckner, Olivier Martinez, Hugh Dancy	Romania; Germany; United Kingdom; United States	
Blood Monkey	Robert Young	F. Murray Abraham, Papimporn Kanjuda, Matt Ryan	United States	
Blood Ties	Sean Delgado	Natalie Dolishny, Lance J. Holt, Pete Punito	United States	Short film
Bloodlines	Stephen Durham	Tracy Kay, Grace Johnston	United States	Direct-to-video
Bone Eater	Jim Wynorski	Adrian Alvarado, Bruce Boxleitner, Randy Flagler	United States	
Book of Lore	Chris LaMartina	Matt Benicewicz, Lauren Meley, Jon Gonzales	United States	
Borderland	Zev Berman	Rider Strong, Brian Presley, Martha Higareda, Jake Muxworthy	United States	
Buried Alive	Robert Kurtzman	Tobin Bell, Leah Rachel, Germaine De Leon	United States	Direct-to-video
Captivity	Roland Joffé	Elisha Cuthbert, Daniel Gillies, Pruitt Taylor Vince	Russia; United States	
The Caretaker	Bryce Olson	Judd Nelson, Carole Russo, Jennifer Tilly	United States	
Carved	Kōji Shiraishi	Eriko Sato, Miki Mizuno, Haruhiko Kato	Japan	
The Cellar Door	Matt Zettell	Michelle Tomlinson, James DuMont, Algernon D'Amassa	United States	
The Chair	Brett Sullivan	Nick Abraham, Michael Capellupo	Canada	
Chicago Massacre	Michael Feifer	Tony Todd, Debbie Rochon, Corin Nemec	United States	Direct-to-video
Closet Space	Mel House	Melanie Donihoo, James LaMarr, Evan Scott	United States	
The Cook	Gregg Simon	Penny Drake, Nina Fehren, Mark Hengst	United States	
Crazy Eights	James Koya Jones	Traci Lords, Frank Whaley, Dina Meyer	United States	
Curse of the Wolf	Len Kabasinski		United States	
El Custodio del Mal	Fernando Saenz	Arturo Martinez Jr., Karla Barahona, Ruth Mendoza	Mexico	
The Daisy Chain	Aisling Walsh	Samantha Morton, Eva Birthistle, Steven Mackintosh	Ireland; United Kingdom	
Dead Silence	James Wan	Ryan Kwanten, Amber Valletta, Donnie Wahlberg	United States	
Dead Tone	Deon Taylor, Brian Hooks	Rutger Hauer, Jud Tylor, Antwon Tanner	United States	
Death of a Ghost Hunter	Sean Tretta	Davina Joy, Patti Tindall, Lindsay Page	United States	
The Deaths of Ian Stone	Dario Piana	Mike Vogel, Christina Cole	United Kingdom; United States	
Decoys 2: Alien Seduction	Jeffery Scott Lando	Tobin Bell, Sam Easton, Lindsay Maxwell	Canada	Direct-to-video
Demon Resurrection	William Hopkins	Damian Ladd, Bashir Solebo, Joe Zaso	United States	
Devil Girl	Howie Askins	Jessica Graham, Willow Hale, Vanessa Kay	United States	
Devil's Diary	Farhad Mann	Alexz Johnson, Miriam McDonald	Canada	Television film
Disturbia	D. J. Caruso	Shia LaBeouf, David Morse, Sarah Roemer, Carrie-Anne Moss	United States	
Donkey Punch	Olly Blackburn	Robert Boulter, Sian Breckin, Tom Burke	United Kingdom	
Doomed to Consume	Jason Stephenson	Joe Knetter, Rachel Grubb, Sonja Beck	United States	
Dreams of the Dead	John Orrichio	Cathy Loch, Tony Rugnetta	United States	
Drive-Thru	Brendan Cowles, Shane Kuhn	Leighton Meester, Nicholas D'Agosto	United States	
Ed Gein: The Butcher of Plainfield	Michael Feifer	Kane Hodder, Michael Berryman, Priscilla Barnes	United States	Direct-to-video
El Muerto	Brian Cox	Wilmer Valderrama, Angie Cepeda, Joel David Moore	United States	Action horror
Exte	Shion Sono	Megumi Sato, Chiaki Kuriyama, Miku Satô	Japan	
The Evil Offspring	Tommy Brunswick	John Anton, Rudy Hatfield, Sandee Ranger	United States	
A Feast of Flesh	Mike Watt	Amy Lynn Best, Rachelle Williams, Debbie Rochon	United States	
The Ferryman	Chris Graham	John Rhys-Davies, Amber Sainsbury, Tamer Hassan	United States	Direct-to-video
The Flesh Keeper	Gerald Nott	Arianne Martin, Clint Glenn, Parrish Randall	United States	Direct-to-video
Flight of The Living Dead: Outbreak On A Plane	Scott Thomas	Dale Midkiff	United States	Direct-to-video
Forest of the Dead	Brian Singleton	Chris Anderson	Canada	
Forest of Death	Danny Pang	Shu Qi	Hong Kong	
Freakshow	Drew Bell	Rebekah Kochan, Dane Rosselli, Diego Barquinero	United States	
Frontière(s)	Xavier Gens	Samuel Le Bihan, Maud Forget, Estelle Lefébure	France; Switzerland	
Gimme Skelter	Scott Phillips	Mark Chavez, Elske McCain, Peter Fishburn, Kurly Tlapoyawa	United States	
The Girl Next Door	Gregory Wilson	Blythe Auffarth, Daniel Manche, William Atherton	United States	
God of Vampires	Rob Fitz	Dharma Lim, Shy Theerakulsit, Ben Wang	United States	
Gothkill	JJ Connelly	Juliya Chernetsky, Tom Velez, Erica Giovinazzo	United States	
Greetings	Kenneth Colley	Kristy Cox, Henry Dunn, Maria Long	United Kingdom	
Grizzly Rage	David DeCoteau	Tyler Hoechlin, Kate Todd, Graham Kosakoski	Canada	
Hallowed Ground	David Benullo	Ned Vaughn, Jaimie Alexander, Jim Cody Williams	United States	
Halloween	Rob Zombie	Malcolm McDowell, Tyler Mane, Scout Taylor-Compton, Danielle Harris, Daeg Faerch	United States	
Hallows Point	Jeffrey Lynn Ward	Christa Campbell, Arnie Pantoja, Kimberly McVicar	United States	
Haunted Forest	Mauro Borrelli	Sevy Di Cione	United States	
The Haunting of Danbury House	John Orrichio, Karl Petry	William Schineller, Cathy Loch, Carrie Nagy	United States	
The Haunting Hour: Don't Think About It	Alex Zamm	Brittany Curran, Tobin Bell, Emily Osment	United States	
The Haunting of Marsten Manor	Dave Sapp	Brianne Davis, Ken Luckey, Ezra Buzzington	United States	
The Haunting of Sorority Row	Bert Kish	Agim Darshi, Meghan Ory, Jessica Horas	Canada	
The Hills Have Eyes 2	Martin Weisz	Michael McMillian, Jessica Stroup, Daniella Alonso	United States	
The Hitcher	Dave Meyers	Sean Bean, Sophia Bush, Zachary Knighton	United States	
Hostel: Part II	Eli Roth	Lauren German, Roger Bart, Heather Matarazzo, Bijou Phillips	United States	
House	Robby Henson	Michael Madsen, Reynaldo Rosales, Heidi Dippold	United States	
The House of the Demon	George L. Ortiz	Rashida Abdul-Jabbar, Gabriel McIver, Katrina Ellsworth	United States	
House of Fears	Ryan Little	Corri English, Sandra McCoy, Corey Sevier	United States	
Hunting Season	Nathan Wrann		United States	
I Am Legend	Francis Lawrence	Will Smith, Alice Braga, Salli Richardson-Whitfield	United States	
Ice Spiders	Tibor Takács	Vanessa A. Williams, Patrick Muldoon, Carleigh King	United States	Television film
I Know Who Killed Me	Chris Sivertson	Lindsay Lohan	United States	
Inside	Alexandre Bustillo, Julien Maury	Alysson Paradis, Béatrice Dalle	France	
The Invasion	Oliver Hirschbiegel, James McTeigue	Jeremy Northam, Nicole Kidman, Daniel Craig	Australia; United States	Film remake
It's My Party and I'll Die If I Want To	Tony Wash	Adrienne Fischer, Tom Savini, Alicia Kenney	United States	
Jack Brooks: Monster Slayer	Jon Knautz	Robert Englund, Trevor Matthews, Rachel Skarsten	Canada	
J-ok'el	Benjamin Williams	Tom Parker, Ana Patricia Rojo, Dee Wallace, Diana Bracho, Angelique Boyer	Mexico	
Kaidan	Hideo Nakata	Teisui Ichiryûsai, Hitomi Kuroki, Kumiko Asō	Japan	
Kiss of the Vampire	Joe Tornatore	Costas Mandylor, Martin Kove, Katie Rich	United States	
Lake Dead	George Bessudo	Kelsey Crane, Jim Devoti, Tara Gerard	United States	
Lake Placid 2	David Flores	Sarah Lafleur, John Schneider, Alicia Ziegler	United States	Television film
The Last Gateway	Demian Rugna	Kevin Schiele, Rodrigo Aragon, Saloma Boustani, Patricio Schwartz, Hugo Halbrich	Argentina	
Left for Dead	Albert Pyun	Oliver Kolker, Brad Krupsaw, Victoria Maurette	Argentina; United States	
The Legend of Bloody Mary	John Stecenko	Paul Preiss, Stephen Macht, Elissa Dowling	United States	
The Legend of Sorrow Creek	Michael Penning	Freya Ravensbergen, Matt Turner, Christina Caron	United States	Direct-to-video
Little Red Devil	Tommy Brunswick	Daniel Baldwin, James Russo, Dee Wallace	United States	
Living Hell	Richard Jefferies	Erica Leerhsen, Judy Herrera, Johnathon Schaech	United States	
Long Pigs	Chris Power, Nathan Hynes	Phyllis Cooper, Anthony Alviano, Kelly McIntosh	Canada	
Mega Snake	Tibor Takács	Siri Baruc, Nick Harvey, Laura Giosh	United States	Television film
The Messengers	Danny Pang, Oxide Pang Chun	Kristen Stewart, Dylan McDermott, Penelope Ann Miller	United States	
The Mist	Frank Darabont	Thomas Jane, Marcia Gay Harden, Laurie Holden	United States	
The Mother of Tears	Dario Argento	Asia Argento, Udo Kier, Massimo Sarchielli, Philippe Leroy	Italy; United States	
Mrs. Amsworth	Frank Sciurba	Magenta Brooks, Christy Sullivan, Jim Nalitz	United States	
Mutation – Annihilation	Timo Rose	Thomas Kercmar, Andreas Pape, Olaf Ittenbach	Germany	
My Name is Bruce	Bruce Campbell	Bruce Campbell, Ted Raimi, Ellen Sandweiss	United States	
Nature of the Beast	Rodman Flender	Eric Mabius, Dave Nichols, Gabriel Hogan	United States	
The Orphanage	Juan Antonio Bayona	Belen Rueda, Fernando Cayo, Roger Princep	Spain; Mexico	
Ouija	Topel Lee	Judy Ann Santos, Jolina Magdangal, Iza Calzado, Rhian Ramos, Desiree del Valle	Philippines	
P2	Franck Khalfoun	Wes Bentley, Rachel Nichols	United States	
Paranormal Activity	Oren Peli	Katie Featherston, Micah Sloat	United States	Direct-to-video
Parkway	Fereydoun Jeyrani	Anahita Nemati, Bita Farahi, Nima Shahrokhshahi	Iran	
Planet Terror (A.K.A. Grindhouse)	Quentin Tarantino, Robert Rodriguez	Rose McGowan, Freddy Rodriguez, Kurt Russell, Zoë Bell	United States	
Pop Skull	Adam Wingard	Lane Hughes	United States	
The Poughkeepsie Tapes	John Erick Dowdle	Stacy Chbosky, Ivar Brogger, Samantha Robson	United Kingdom	
Prey	Darrell James Roodt	Carly Schoeder, Peter Weller, Bridget Moynahan	United States; South Africa	
Prey for the Beast	Brett Kelly	Mark Courneyea, Anastasia Kimmett, Keri Draper	Canada	
Primeval	Michael Katleman, Gideon Emery	Brooke Langton, Jürgen Prochnow	United States	
Pumpkinhead: Blood Feud	Michael Hurst	Claire Lams, Lance Henriksen, Amy Manson	United Kingdom; United States	
Putevoy obkhodchik	Igor Shavlak	Dmitriy Orlov, Yuliya Mikhailova, Oleg Kamenshchikov	Russia	
The Rage	Robert Kurtzman	Reggie Bannister, Andrew Divoff, Rachel Scheer	United States	
The Raven	David DeCoteau	Andre Velts, Litha Booi, Traverse Le Goff	Canada; United States	
The Reaping	Stephen Hopkins	Hilary Swank, David Morrissey, Idris Elba, AnnaSophia Robb, Stephen Rea	United States	
REC	Jaume Balagueró, Paco Plaza	Manuela Velasco, Ferran Terraza, Jorge-Yamam Serrano	Spain	
Reign of the Gargoyles	Chase Parker	Joe Penny, Wes Ramsey, Sean Mahon	United States	Television film
Resident Evil: Extinction	Russell Mulcahy	Milla Jovovich, Oded Fehr, Ali Larter	United States	
Return to House on Haunted Hill	Víctor Garcia	Cerina Vincent, Andrew Lee Potts, Amanda Righetti	United States	Direct-to-video
Revamped	Jeff Rector	Christa Campbell, Martin Kove, Carel Struycken	United States	
Rise: Blood Hunter	Sebastian Gutierrez	Lucy Liu, Michael Chiklis, Carla Gugino	United States	
Saw IV	Darren Lynn Bousman	Tobin Bell, Scott Patterson	United States	
The Seamstress	Jesse James Miller	Lance Henriksen, Kailin See, David Kopp	United States	
Secrets of the Clown	Ryan Badalamenti	Tami Badalamenti, Kelli Clevenger, Micheal Kott	United States	
Seed	Uwe Boll	Will Sanderson, Ralf Möller, Michael Paré	Canada	
Senki	Milcho Manchevski	Sabina Ajrula, Vesna Stanojevska, Borce Nacev	Bulgaria; Germany; Italy; Macedonia; Spain	
Shadow Puppets	Michael Winnick	James Marsters, Jolene Blalock, Tony Todd	United States	
The Shadow Within	Silvana Zancolo	Hayley J Williams, Rod Hallett, Georgia Mitchell	Italy	
Shrooms	Paddy Breathnach	Lindsey Haun, Alice Greczyn, Max Kasch	Ireland; Denmark; United Kingdom	
Sick Girl	Eben McGarr	Leslie Andrews, Stephen Geoffreys, John McGarr	United States	
Sick Nurses	Piraphan Laoyont, Thodsapol Siriwiwat	Ase Wang, Philip Hersh, Libby Brien	Thailand	
Sigma Die!	Michael Hoffman Jr.	Reggie Bannister, Heather Zagone, Nikie Zambo	United States	
The Signal	Jacob Gentry, David Bruckner, Dan Bush	A.J. Bowen, Anessa Ramsey, Justin Welborn	United States	
Skinwalkers	James Isaac	Jason Behr, Elias Koteas, Rhona Mitra	United States	
Skull & Bones	T.S. Slaughter	Derrick Wolf, Michael Burke, Jared DiCroce	United States	Direct-to-video
Slasher	Frank W. Montag	Thomas Kercmar, Patrick Dewayne, Vivien Walter	Germany	
Socket	Sean Abley	Derek Long, Alexandra Billings, Matthew Montgomery	United States	
Solstice	Daniel Myrick	Shawn Ashmore, Amanda Seyfried, Hilarie Burton, Elisabeth Harnois	United States	Direct-to-video
Somebody Help Me	Christopher B. Stokes	Marques Houston, Omarion, Jessica Friedman	United States	Direct-to-video
Something Beneath	David Winning	Kevin Sorbo, Brittany Scobie, Brendan Beiser	Canada	
Someone Behind You	Oh Ki-hwan	Yoon Jin-seo, Park Ki-woong, Lee Ki-woo	South Korea	
Species – The Awakening	Nick Lyon	Edy Arellano, Helena Mattsson, Marco Bacuzzi	United States	Direct-to-video
Splatter Disco	Richard Griffin	Ken Foree, Sarah Nicklin, Debbie Rochon	United States	
Stir of Echoes: The Homecoming	Ernie Barbarash	Rob Lowe	United States	Direct-to-video
The Suicide Song (Densen Uta)	Masato Harada	Ryuhei Matsuda, Yusuke Iseya, Yoshino Kimura, Hiroshi Abe	Japan	
The Tattooist	Peter Burger	Jason Behr, Caroline Cheong	New Zealand	Direct-to-video
Teeth	Mitchell Lichtenstein	Jess Weixler, John Hensley	United States	
Timber Falls	Tony Giglio	Brianna Brown, Josh Randall, Beth Broderick	United States	
Tokyo Gore Police	Yoshihiro Nishimura	Eihi Shiina, Itsuji Itao, Yukihide Benny	Japan	
Tooth And Nail	Mark Young	Michael Madsen, Rider Strong, Vinnie Jones	United States	
Torment	Steve Sessions	Suzi Lorraine, Ted Alderman, Jeff Dylan Graham	United States	
Trick 'r Treat	Michael Dougherty	Anna Paquin	United States	
Trackman	Igor Shavlak	Yuliya Mikhailova, Oleg Kamenshchikov, Aleksei Dmitriyev	Russia	
Undead or Alive	Glasgow Phillips	Chris Kattan, James Denton	United States	
Underbelly	Matt A. Cade	Felicia Bianca Lopez, Hawk Storm, Jennifer Harlow	United States	
Unearthed	Matthew Leutwyler	Emmanuelle Vaugier, Luke Goss, Beau Garrett	United States	
Unholy	Daryl Goldberg	Adrienne Barbeau	United States	Direct-to-video
The Unseeable	Wisit Sasanatieng	Siraphan Wattanajinda, Tassawan Seneewongse, Suporntip Chuangrangsri	Thailand	
Vacancy	Nimród Antal	Luke Wilson, Ethan Embry, Kate Beckinsale	United States	
The Wailer II	Paul Miller	Seth Michaels, Roger Cudney, Nadia van de Ven, Dulce Alvarado	United States	Direct-to-video
War of the Living Dead 2 – Girls, Zombies and Rock'n'Roll!	Mark E. Poole	Jason Crowe, Tucky Williams, Chris Albro	United States	
Werewolf: The Devil's Hound	Gregory C. Parker, Christian Pindar	Art Longley, Kevin Shea, Tamara Malawitz	United States	
Wind Chill	Greg Jacobs	Emily Blunt, Ashton Holmes	United Kingdom; United States	
The Wizard of Gore	Jeremy Kasten	Crispin Glover, Brad Dourif	United States	
Wrong Turn 2: Dead End	Joe Lynch	Erica Leerhsen, Texas Battle, Henry Rollins	United States	Direct-to-video
X-Cross	Kenta Fukasaku	Ami Suzuki, Nao Matsushita, Ayuko Iwane	Japan	
Zombie Wars	David A. Prior	Adam Mayfield, Alissa Koenig, Jim Marlow	United States	
