= List of Breakout Kings characters =

The following is a list of characters in the A&E drama series Breakout Kings.

== The team ==
=== Charlie Duchamp ===
Charlie Duchamp (Laz Alonso), a Deputy U.S. Marshal and head of the task force. He came from the Department of Criminal Program Analysis and was assigned to a desk job for six years because of a congenital heart defect which is revealed in the episode "Paid in Full". He has a wife Marisol, whom he loves but has trouble putting above his work. Against his doctor’s and wife’s advice, he agrees to lead the task force. He was under a great deal of pressure to produce results, since any failures in the task force could have led to his being permanently placed on desk work. Despite it, he always stood for his team. In the episode "There Are Rules" when U.S. Marshals Chief Director Richard Wendell wanted Ray off the team claiming he is a dirty cop, Charlie put his own career on the line to retain Ray and keep the team together. Also in the season two premiere episode "An Unjust Death" when Chief Inspector Craig Renner offered him a promotion, he turned it down for the team, but unfortunately Charlie was killed in action by fugitive Damian Fontleroy in the same episode.

=== Ray Zancanelli ===
Ray Zancanelli (Domenick Lombardozzi), a former Deputy U.S. Marshal who lost his job after he was convicted of stealing money from a crime scene to buy his daughter a car. This information was originally kept a secret from the other convicts until Shea overheard Charlie discussing it with Ray. He appears to be able to relate better with the convicts than Charlie because he has been in a position similar to theirs. Ray is on parole throughout season one, living at a halfway house, and has been appointed a Special Deputy U.S. Marshal. He knows the streets well and takes care of business in his own, unorthodox style. Because of his appointed position, he is allowed to carry a weapon, unlike the convicts. Though his obsessive devotion to his job leads to divorce, he still maintains a close relationship with his daughter Teresa, who stays with his ex-wife Christina. He cares so much for her that he tries to protect her from a convict in the episode "Like Father, Like Son". Despite her psychological disorders, Ray hired Julianne and trusted her. Julianne admired Ray, even at one point showing romantic interest in Ray and tried to kiss him in the episode "Fun with Chemistry". Prior to his conviction, he came up with the idea for the task force. After Charlie's death in season two, Chief Director Wendell reinstates Ray to his former position, having promised to do so if Charlie accepted a promotion. He routinely calls the convicts on the task force, "animals," though he has warmed up in recent episodes.

=== Shea Daniels ===
Seamus "Shea" Daniels (Malcolm Goodwin), a former gang leader whose criminal enterprises (drug smuggling, weapons trafficking, etc.) covered most of the United States. At 17 years old, Shea started a gang in Washington Heights, New York. At 20, he had set up crews in New Jersey, Pennsylvania, and Connecticut. By 23, his "franchise" was in 40 cities in 32 states. His experience and "street smarts" allow him to provide a working knowledge of how convicts think and move. He originally came up with the name "Breakout Kings" for the task force and designed a graffiti-style logo for it. He has girlfriend Vanessa, whom he deeply cares for. In the episode "One for the Money", he told his girlfriend Vanessa that he needs to follow the rules if he ever wants to see her again, before leaving a small diamond from the jewelry store in her hand. In the season one finale episode "Where in the World is Carmen Vega", when Vanessa was kidnapped, he was desperate to put everything in line to save her. In the episode, "Freakshow", it is revealed that he is afraid of clowns.

=== Fritz Gunderson ===
Fritz Gunderson (Brock Johnson) was one of the four initial convicts and former fugitives chosen by Ray Zancanelli to help catch other fugitives, using their expertise as criminals to do so. But when he tried to escape using a knife he swiped while they stopped for lunch at a restaurant, he was sent back to the Coxsackie Correctional Facility with his sentence doubled. He returned on the episode Off the Beaten Path to help the team find a deranged and crazy man in the Adirondacks, a place he knew about. However, he only leads them to the trail as Erica states they can continue without his help as she once tracked a man here. Fritz is tied up to the van and at the end of the episode, he is sent back to Coxsackie with a plate of ribs, a case of beer and a Hustler magazine.

=== Philomena "Philly" Rotchliffer ===
Philomena "Philly" Rotchliffer (Nicole Steinwedell), was one of the four initial convicts and former fugitives chosen by Ray Zancanelli to help catch other fugitives, using their expertise as criminals to do so. But she was sent back to the Muncy Correctional Institution with her prison sentence doubled when she accessed her bank accounts in Denmark to fund an escape plan.

=== Erica Reed ===
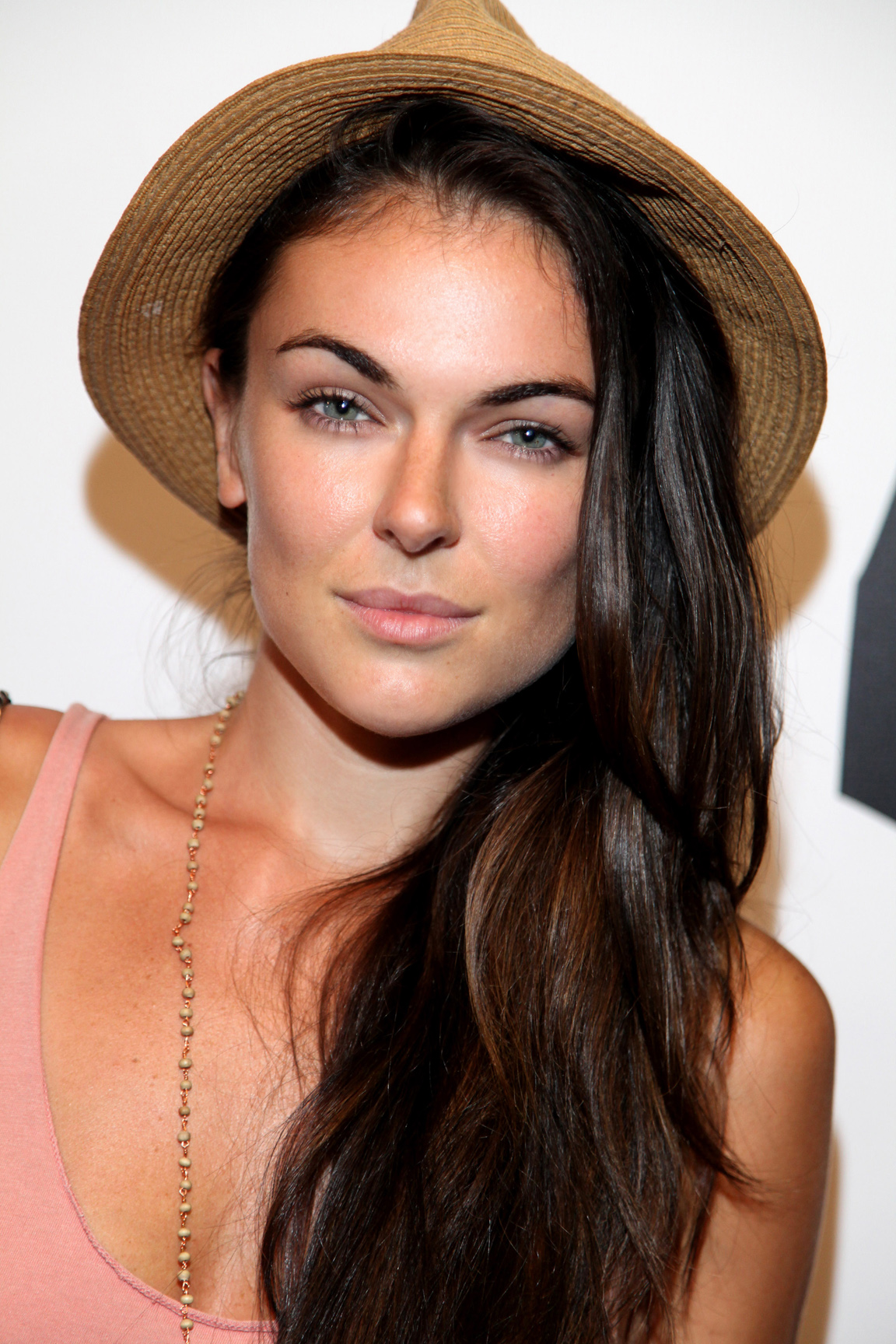
Serinda Swan

Erica Reed (Serinda Swan), a bounty hunter and expert tracker. She is Philly's replacement on the team. Unlike the rest of her teammates, she was hand-picked by Charlie Duchamp instead of Ray Zancanelli. She was raised by her father, who himself was a bounty hunter. He was tortured and killed in retaliation for the capture of a gang member, and Erica hunted down and killed five of the six people involved in the murder. Barely 20 at the time, she killed her victims and hid their bodies so flawlessly that she was only convicted of weapons charges. She has a daughter who currently resides with the child's father Denny but she has little to no contact with her, despite her desire to be more involved with her. The murder of her father and the loss of her daughter causes her great pain and anger. Beneath her stoic demeanor, Erica has a volatile temper she constantly fights to keep in check, but it can, and sometimes does, violently erupt.

In season two, she shows romantic interest in a neighbor Pete Gillies who works on the second floor of their building. She even slept with him at some occasions without the team knowing about it. But in the episode "SEALd Fate", she realizes he used her to find a person Tommy Fitzgerald and disappeared thereafter. Later, in the episode "Freakshow", he contacts Erica, tells her that he has decided to run away and asks her to come along with him. But she refuses and tells him to disappear. Erica contacts him and he tells her he is going to turn himself in and implicate her as well. However, in the episode "Served Cold", Shea gets to know about Pete's plans. Shea uses Erica's cellphone and messages him posing as her. He then meets him, beats him up and tells him that he is to confess to everything but should never mention anything about Erica.

=== Dr. Lloyd Lowery ===
Dr. Lloyd Lowery (Jimmi Simpson), a former child prodigy and a behaviorist with a bachelor's degree (1993) and M.D. (1997) from Harvard. He is a genius with a 210 IQ. He provides in-depth psychological evaluations of escaped convicts, which allow him to predict the movements and actions that an escaped convict may undertake before they get away. Lloyd also provides psychological help to Julianne and Erica on their various mental problems whenever possible. Ironically, Lloyd suffers from an addiction to gambling. For selling illegal prescriptions to college students to cover his gambling debts, he lost his medical license and was sentenced to 25 years in prison. He deeply regrets the fact that an 18-year-old girl in a deep depression committed suicide with an overdose of pills he prescribed. In the episode, "SEALd Fate", he got frustrated by the fact that he was kidnapped and made audience to a brutal killing of an innocent girl by Damien Fontleroy. By which he decides to quit the team. However, in the episode "Freakshow", he is convinced by Ray to rejoin the team.

=== Julianne "Jules" Simms ===
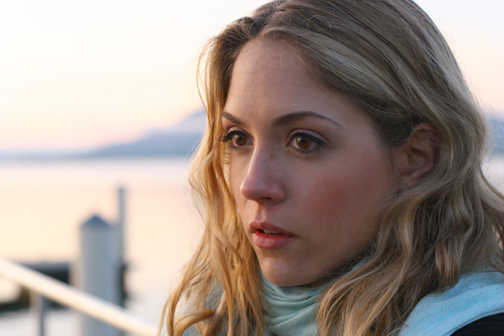
Brooke Nevin

Julianne "Jules" Simms (Brooke Nevin), a former student at the Federal Law Enforcement Training Center. She acts as an analyst, researching and determining the various resources at the disposal of the convicts; such as family, money, and property they may use to aid their escape. She was first in her class until she was expelled for her various psychological disorders which include social anxiety, panic disorder, and depression which derailed her career. She retreated to the basement apartment of her mother's home where she worked as a telemarketer, never truly having to interact with others. Despite her psychological disorders, Ray hired Julianne and trusted her. By which Julianne admired Ray, even at one point showing romantic interest in Ray and tried to kiss him in the episode "Fun with Chemistry".

==== Relationship with Lloyd ====
Julianne and Lloyd share a very friendly relationship since Lloyd willfully attempts to help her overcome her disorders. In turn Julianne cares for Lloyd and considers him a very important friend. In the episode "SEALd Fate", she rejected Lloyd's proposal and told she has only feelings of friendship towards him. She was very shaken when Lloyd was kidnapped by Damien Fontelroy. She was almost in tears before she gets to see that Lloyd is safe.

== Recurring ==
=== Marisol Duchamp ===
Marisol (Yara Martinez) is the wife of Charlie Duchamp. In the episode, "Like Father, Like Son", she was almost killed by a package bomb sent by Christian Beaumont to Duchamp's residence.

Appearances
#	Episode
4	"Out of the Mouths of Babes"
6	"Like Father, Like Son"
9	"One for the Money"
23	"Served Cold"

=== Vanessa ===
Vanessa (Tattiawna Jones) is the girlfriend of Shea Daniels. In the episode "Where in the World is Carmen Vega", she was kidnapped and held hostage by Carmen Vega's men but was later rescued.

Appearances
#	Episode
9	"One for the Money"
13	"Where in the World is Carmen Vega"

=== Teresa ===
Teresa (Zoë Belkin) is the daughter of Ray Zancanelli. In the episode "Served Cold", she was kidnapped by Damien Fontleroy but was later rescued.

Appearances
#	Episode
5	"Queen of Hearts"
6	"Like Father, Like Son"
23	"Served Cold"

=== Richard Wendell ===
Richard Wendell (Gregg Henry) is the Chief Director for the U.S. Marshals.

Appearances
#	Episode
12	"There Are Rules"
23	"Served Cold"

=== Pete Gillies ===
Pete Gillies (Ian Bohen) is a man who works on the second floor of the Breakout Kings' building. Erica had a romantic interest in him. She even slept with him at some occasions without the team knowing about it. But in the episode "SEALd Fate", she realizes he used her to find a person named Tommy Fitzgerald, and he disappears thereafter. Later, in the episode "Freakshow", he contacts Erica, tells her that he has decided to run away and asks her to come along with him. But she refuses and tells him to disappear. Erica contacts him and he tells her he is going to turn himself in and implicate her as well. However, in the episode "Served Cold", Shea gets to know about Pete's plans. Shea uses Erica's cellphone and messages him posing as her. He then meets him, beats him up and tells him that he is to confess to everything but should never mention anything about Erica.

Appearances
#	Episode
14	"An Unjust Death"
15	"Round Two"
16	"Double Down"
18	"Self Help"
21	"SEALd Fate"
22	"Freakshow"
23	"Served Cold"

== The fugitives ==
The following are the list of escaped fugitives which the team has caught.

=== Season 1 ===
The fugitives of the season one episodes are as follows,

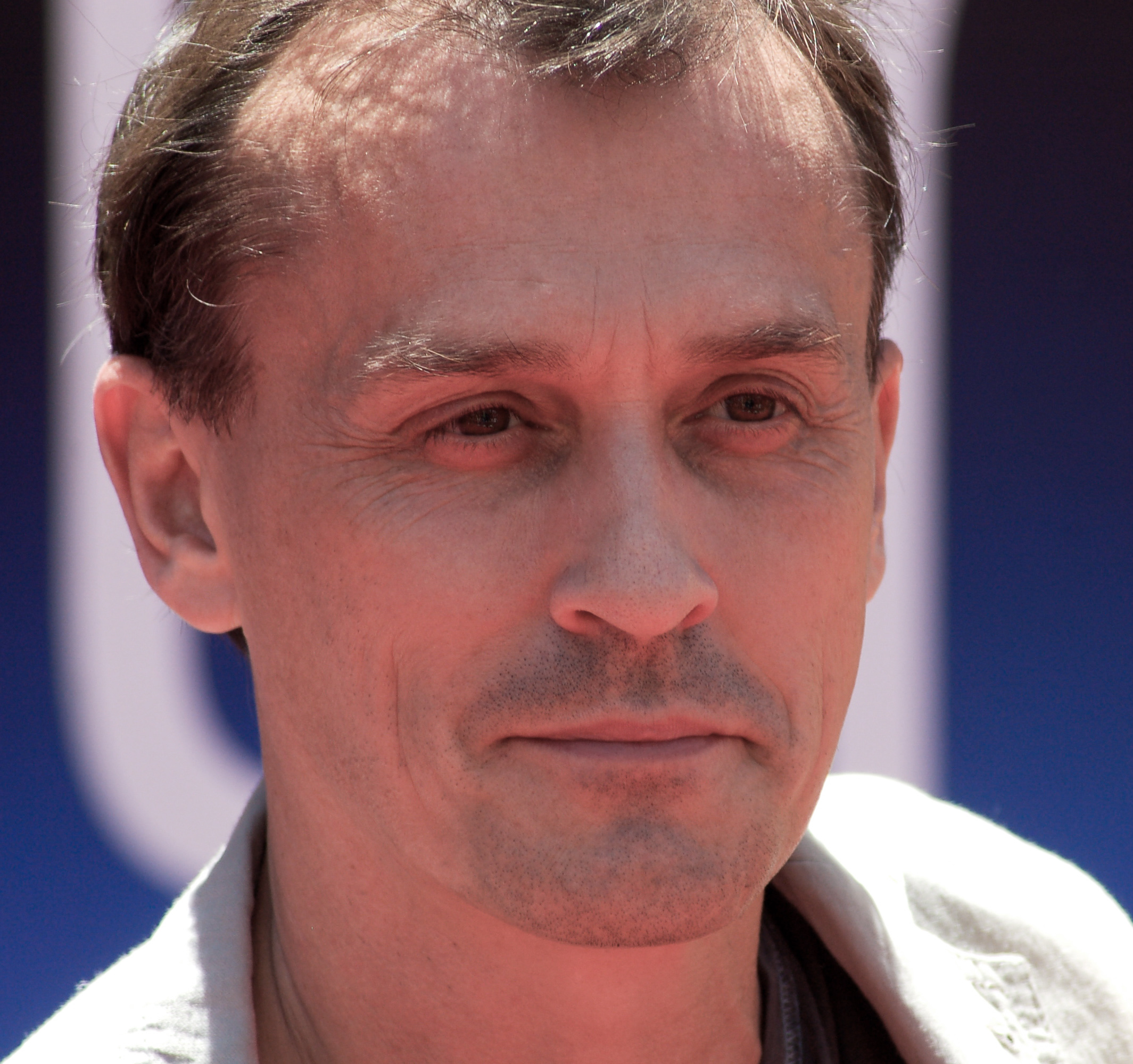
Robert Knepper portrays Theodore "T-Bag" Bagwell

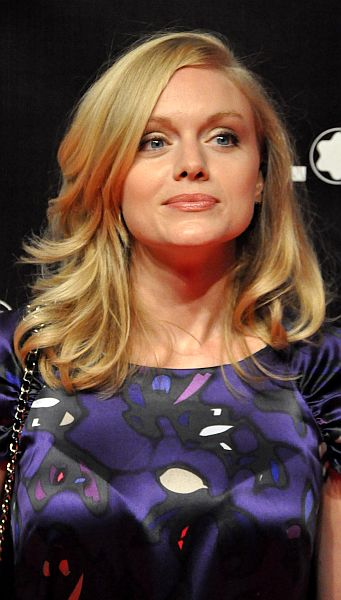
Christina Cole portrays Lilah Tompkins

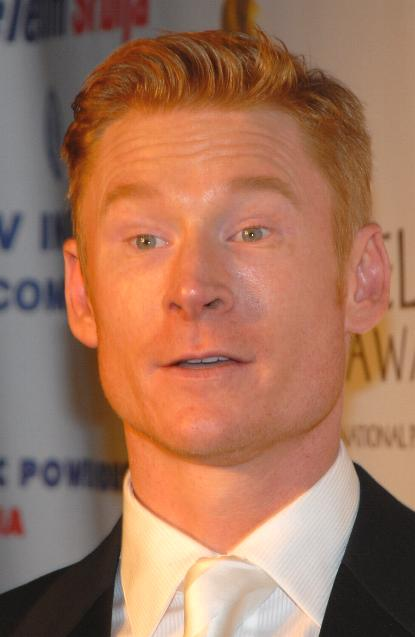
Zack Ward portrays Christian Beaumont

Episode	Fugitive	Portrayed By	Crime Detail
1	August Tillman	Jason Cerbone	Convicted of murder, Tillman killed a biker in a bar who insulted his wife. Tillman then escaped from county prison while awaiting trial. He was caught by Ray Zancanelli three weeks later but had already killed a deli cashier and a woman whose car he carjacked.
2	Xavier Price	Jamie McShane	Convicted of reckless homicide, Price claims he picked up a teen female runaway and was transporting her to a shelter when she robbed him at knifepoint. A struggle ensued resulting in the girl's murder.
3	Theodore "T-Bag" Bagwell	Robert Knepper	Theodore "T-Bag" Bagwell was sentenced to life in prison for six counts each of kidnapping, rape and murder. Bagwell spent his youth in and out of jail, often for vandalism and torturing animals. While in the fourth grade he was sentenced to a stint in juvenile hall for attempting to set his teacher's house on fire. Before being incarcerated at Fox River Penitentiary (the jail featured on Prison Break) T-Bag was on the run for myriad crimes including murder, battery, assault, rape, and kidnapping, and was later captured due to an appearance on America's Most Wanted.
4	Joe Ramsey	Derek Phillips	Convicted child sex offender Joseph Ramsey is a former counselor at an elementary school in suburban Massachusetts. He is given a 60 year sentence for molesting five victims, all eight-year-old girls.
5	Lilah Tompkins	Christina Cole	Convicted and serving a 25 year mandatory minimum sentence for stabbing her second husband 48 times. Tompkins' first husband died in a house fire which she was suspected of starting, but nothing was ever proven.
6	Christian Beaumont	Zack Ward	Convicted and serving a sentence for having a stand-off with federal agents after the government seized his family farm in order to build a highway. During the course of the standoff Beaumont killed one federal agent and wounded three others.
7	Marlon "Mars" O'Connell	Rodney Eastman	Serving a one-year bid for trespassing and petty larceny.
8	Carl McCann	Matthew John Armstrong	Carl McCann was convicted of felony robbery, and known for posing as a door-to-door salesman and then robbing the people at gunpoint who let him into their homes.
8	Oliver Day	Jonathan Keltz	Oliver Day stole a car to go for a joyride, but when the old man he yanked out of the car died from a heart attack, he was charged with felony murder and given 25 years.
9	Andre Brennan	Richard Burgi	Convicted of tax evasion, Andre was a suspected associate of the Bad Elvises, a ring of international jewelry thieves. They were given the name after a heist in which they all wore pompadour wigs, and are known for advanced materials, coded communications, and violence: one of their heists gone wrong left two security guards dead.
10	Virgil Downing	Mark Pellegrino	Virgil Downing was known to have committed over three dozen contract killings, with his victims including a judge, a housewife, and a dog, among others. He wasn't convicted of any of these murders until he killed a police commissioner, and as he was fleeing the scene, his appendix burst. He was found unconscious with the murder weapon still on him.
11	Bennett Ballester	Robin Wilcock	Bennett was serving a 10-year sentence for kidnapping and killing a newscaster with whom he was obsessed. Her body was never located, but her DNA was found under his fingernails. When it was determined that he was insane, he was sent to the Sunnybrook Psychiatric Detention Center.
12	Ronald Barnes	Jeff Seymour	Ronald Barnes is a sociopath. An embezzler convicted of charities fraud and insider trading, he had stolen over half a billion dollars before being apprehended.
13	Carmen Vega	Lauren Velez	Carmen was in for 20 years for possession of coke. She claimed that it was her husband's business, but the reality was that she was running the entire operation herself.

=== Season 2 ===
The fugitives of the season two episodes are as follows,

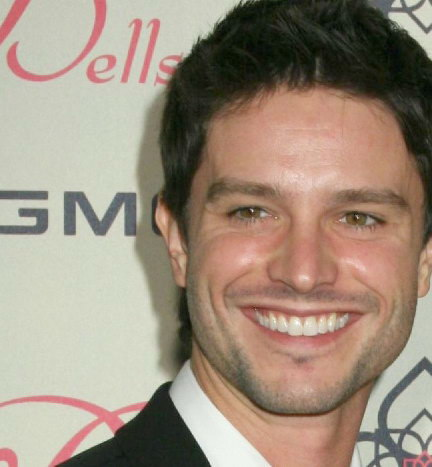
Jason Behr portrays Damien Fontleroy

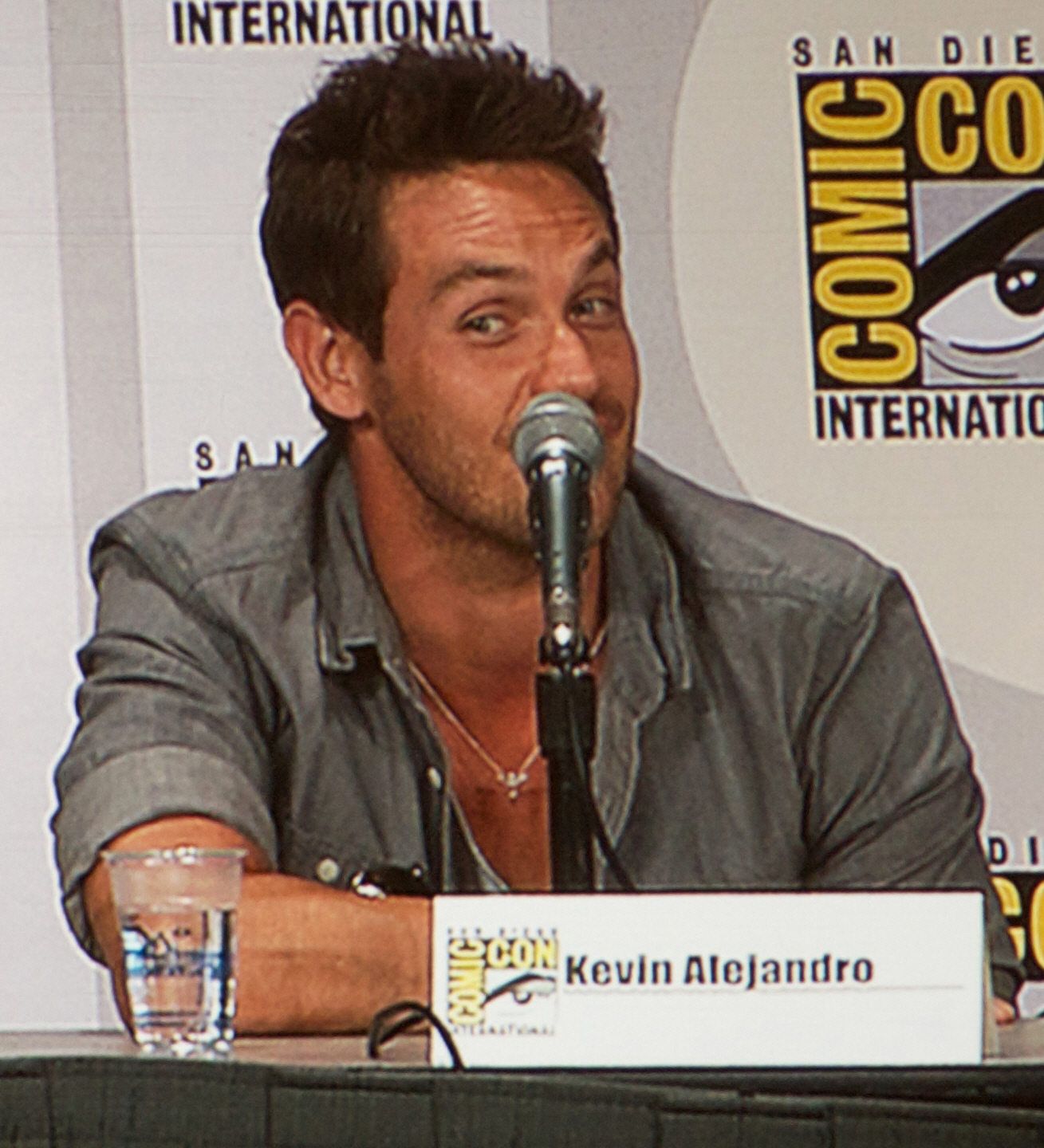
Kevin Alejandro portrays Benny Cruz

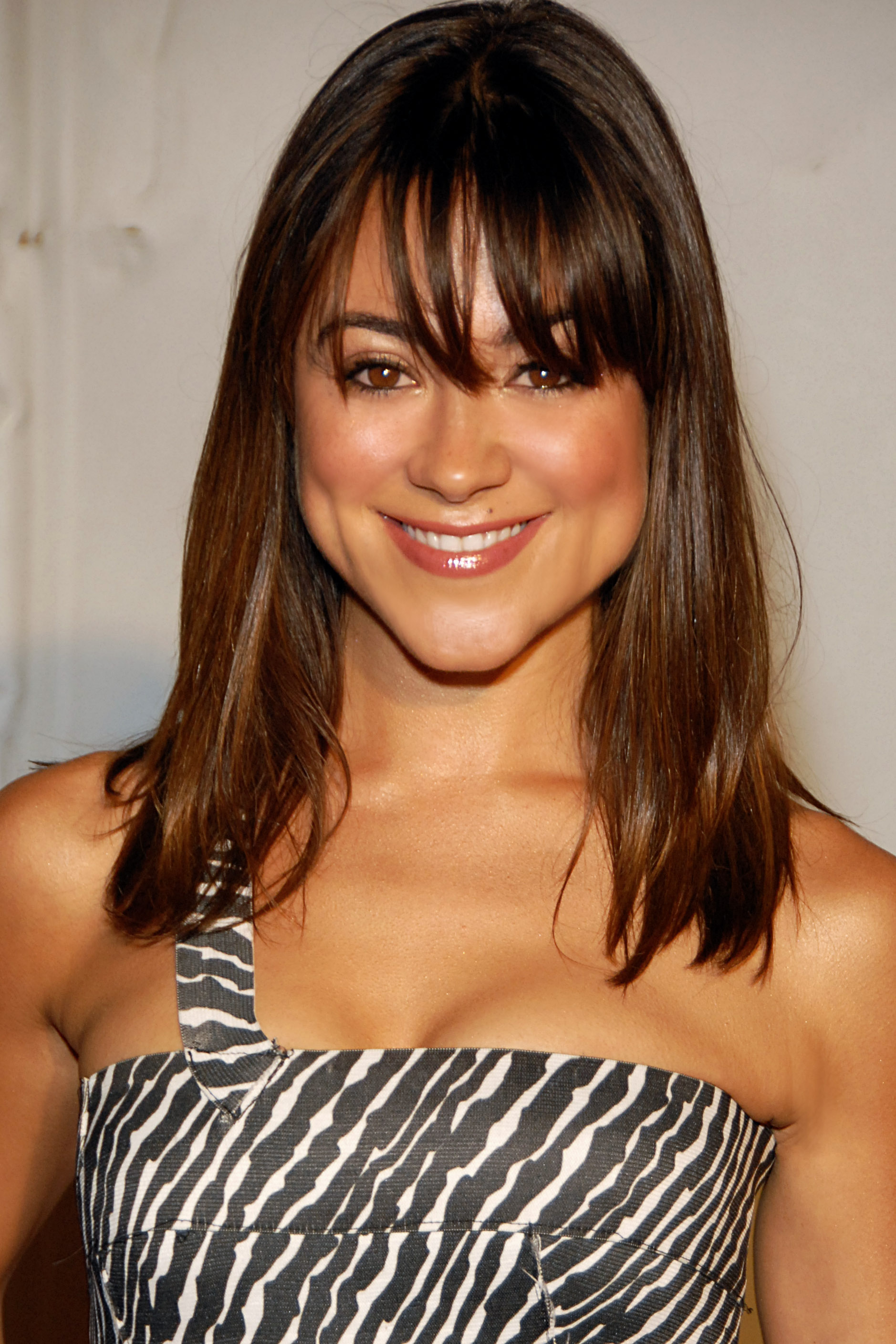
Camille Guaty portrays Emmy Sharp

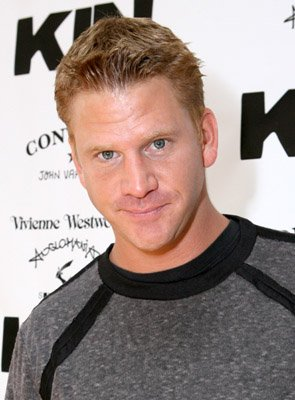
Dash Mihok portrays Jonah Whitman

Episode	Fugitive	Portrayed By	Crime Detail
14	Damien Fontleroy	Jason Behr	Damien spent ten years in prison for killing three women while his partner was sent to a different prison. While in those ten years he slowly gathered knowledge about the prison and its workings. Then he engineered an escape plan by killing the guard in his cell and taught himself to speak Hebrew to stop the dogs (they were trained in Israel).
14	Brent Howson	Nate Mooney	Brent was in for aiding in killing three women along with his partner Damien Fontleroy over three-month cooling periods. Brent acted as audience while Damien tortured the victims.
15	Victor Mannion	Channon Roe	Victor Mannion was the leader of the Mole Hill Crew, a team of tunneling thieves who pulled off a daring robbery in a Marine base. They made off with the entire payroll, a nine million dollar jackpot, all in small bills. The money was never recovered and police were unable to pin the robbery on Victor. They were, however, able to get both him and crew member Pat Duffy put away for a short stint on weapon charges.
15	Brody Ardell	James Harvey Ward	Brody Ardell, a new addition to the crew, appeared to be serving three years on a larceny charge. In actuality, he was an undercover F.B.I. agent investigating the Marine heist.
15	Pat Duffy	Kyle Clements	Pat Duffy, a member of the Mole Hill Crew.
16	Travis Muncey	Nicholas D'Agosto	Struggling actor Travis Muncey escaped while awaiting trial on an illegal handgun possession charge. He was arrested after seeking treatment for an accidental, self-inflicted gunshot wound to the rear end, not realizing that hospitals are bound by law to report gunshot wounds to the authorities. Once his mug shot hit the wires, facial recognition software identified him in photos with Bob Dixon, one of the most violent and powerful arms traffickers in the world. Dixon had also been placed on the Marshals’ top fifteen most wanted list for an incident in which he killed two Marshals and then fled the country.
17	Benny Cruz	Kevin Alejandro	Benny Cruz lost his mother when he was twelve years old, and was taken in by his uncle, Roberto Menchaca. A high-ranking member in the Eastside Royals gang, Menchaca wasted no time indoctrinating Cruz into the "family". Cruz murdered two rival gang bangers while in the Royals, and was given a life sentence. While in prison, Cruz learned that he had Stage 4 Small Cell Lung Cancer. He was given two to three months to live.
18	Ronnie Marcum	Omari Hardwick	Ronnie Marcum, an up-and-coming self-help guru, was busted for paying illegal immigrants $3 an hour to package and ship his Be Your Own Success Shape books and CDs. Halfway through serving a 10-month sentence in a minimum security prison, he made his escape.
19	Emmy Sharp	Camille Guaty	Emmy Sharp began working as a prostitute at the age of 16. Tired of being taken advantage of by her pimp, she tried to organize the other girls to cut him out. He stopped the reorganization and beat Emmy severely. As soon as she recovered, she got her revenge. Waiting until he fell asleep, Emmy doused her former pimp with gasoline and set him on fire. She was given twenty-five years for her crime.
20	Rodney Cain	Josh Zuckerman	Rodney Cain was 18 when he murdered the stepfather of his then 16-year-old girlfriend, Lorraine Hamilton. Rodney told police that he did it because Lorraine's stepfather threatened to have him arrested for statutory rape.
21	Jonah Whitman	Dash Mihok	Ex-Navy SEAL Jonah Whitman was sentenced to six years in prison after nearly killing a man in a bar fight. Ten months into his sentence, he made his escape.
22	Max Morris	Michael Filipowich	Voted "Best Escape Artist in America" at the age of 16, Max was a well known circus performer. He grew up in the Porter Brothers Circus, which made it all the stranger when he inexplicably set fire to the circus tent moments after his big finale, killing four spectators and leaving a dozen more burned or trampled in the ensuing stampede. Max ended up in supermax after escaping from two other prisons, and was serving four consecutive life sentences when he made his third escape.
23	Damien Fontleroy	Jason Behr	The Breakout Kings came very close to capturing Damien after he and his partner in crime, Brent Howson, escaped from prison. U.S. Marshal Charlie DuChamp and his team tracked the fugitives to an abandoned warehouse where they had a young woman held prisoner. Charlie freed the young woman, and chased Brent outside, where Brent pulled a gun on the Marshal. Charlie put him down, but was shot from behind by Damien. The wound was fatal. Ever since, the Breakout Kings have been tracking Damien, looking for justice. Finally, Damien has been caught but was killed by Ray after being pushed off the roof of a building and crashing into the roof of a car below.
