= Breakout Kings =

American drama television series

- Original promotional poster
- Genre: Action; Crime; Thriller
- Created by: Nick Santora; Matt Olmstead
- Starring: Laz Alonso; Domenick Lombardozzi; Brooke Nevin; Malcolm Goodwin; Serinda Swan; Jimmi Simpson
- Composer: Ramin Djawadi
- Country of origin: United States
- Original language: English
- No. of seasons: 2
- No. of episodes: 23 (list of episodes)

Production
- Executive producers: Peter Chernin; Matt Olmstead; Katherine Pope; Nick Santora; Gavin Hood
- Producers: Lauren Stein; Ed Milkovich; Joseph Patrick Finn
- Production locations: Toronto; Baton Rouge
- Cinematography: Derick V. Underschultz; Fernando Argüelles; Jim Whitaker
- Editors: Etienne Des Lauriers; Eric Seaburn; Paul Trejo; Scott Eilers; Chris Conlee
- Running time: 43 minutes
- Production companies: Matt Olmstead Productions; Blackjack Films; Chernin Entertainment; Fox 21

Original release
- Network: A&E
- Release: March 6, 2011 – April 29, 2012

Related
- Prison Break

Breakout Kings is an American drama television series that aired on the A&E network. It is a production of Fox 21. The series was created, written, and executive-produced by Nick Santora and Matt Olmstead, who previously worked together on Prison Break. Peter Chernin, Katherine Pope, and Gavin Hood also served as executive producers.

Though the guest appearance of Prison Break character Theodore "T-Bag" Bagwell confirms a shared continuity between the two series, it is not a direct spin-off. Frank Grillo, who recurred in Prison Break's first season as Nick Savrinn, appears in the episode "Queen of Hearts" as a different character named Agent Stoltz.

The series premiered on March 6, 2011, and was the most-watched original drama series in A&E's history among adults 25–54 and adults 18–49, delivering 1.6 million adults 25–54 and 1.5 million adults 18–49.

The series was picked up for a second season which premiered on March 4, 2012. The second-season finale aired on April 29, 2012, at 9 p.m. ET/PT and featured two back-to-back episodes, "Freakshow" and "Served Cold", instead of the usual one-hour installment at 10 p.m.

A&E cancelled Breakout Kings on May 17, 2012, after two seasons.

== Premise ==
The series follows a task force assembled by the U.S. Marshals to capture prison escapees. Several current convicts are offered a chance to aid in this effort, with the promise of a transfer to a minimum-security prison and a reduction in their sentences for every fugitive they catch. However, if any of them tries to escape, they will all be returned to their original prisons and their sentences will be doubled.

== Cast ==
=== The team ===
- Laz Alonso portrays Charlie Duchamp, a Deputy U.S. Marshal and head of the task force. He comes from the Department of Criminal Program Analysis and was assigned to a desk job for six years because of a congenital heart defect. He is under a great deal of pressure to produce results, since any failures in the task force would have led to his being permanently placed on desk work. In the season two premiere episode "An Unjust Death", Chief Inspector Craig Renner offers Charlie a promotion, but he turns it down for the sake of the team. He is killed by fugitive Damian Fontleroy near the end of the episode.
- Domenick Lombardozzi portrays Ray Zancanelli, a former Deputy U.S. Marshal who lost his job after he was convicted of stealing money from a crime scene to buy his daughter a car. This information is originally kept a secret from the other convicts until Shea (see below) overhears Charlie discussing it with Ray. He appears to be able to relate better with the convicts than Charlie because he has been in a position similar to theirs. Ray is on parole throughout season one, living at a halfway house, and has been appointed a Special Deputy U.S. Marshal. As such, he is allowed to carry a firearm, unlike the convicts. Ray is divorced, but maintains a good relationship with his daughter. Prior to his conviction, he came up with the idea for the task force. After Charlie's death, Chief Inspector Renner reinstates Ray to his former position, having promised to do so if Charlie accepted a promotion.
- Malcolm Goodwin portrays Shea Daniels, a former gang leader whose criminal enterprises (drug smuggling, weapons trafficking, etc.) covered most of the United States. His experience and "street smarts" allow him to provide a working knowledge of how convicts think and move. He originally comes up with the name "Breakout Kings" for the task force and designs a graffiti-style logo for it. In the Season 1 episode "One for the Money", he tells his girlfriend Vanessa that he cannot wait for another six years to get out of prison to be with her and that there is another way, but Vanessa replies, "We can't be fugitives again."
- Serinda Swan portrays Erica Reed, a bounty hunter and expert tracker. She was raised by her father, who himself was a bounty hunter. He was tortured and killed in retaliation for the capture of a gang member, and Erica hunted down and killed five of the six people involved in the murder. Barely 20 at the time, she killed her victims and hid their bodies so flawlessly that she was only convicted of weapons charges. She has a daughter who currently resides with the child's father but she has little to no contact with her, despite her desire to be more involved with her. The murder of her father and the loss of her daughter causes her great pain and anger. In season two, she shows romantic interest in a neighbor Pete Gillies who works on the second floor of their building. She even sleeps with him at some occasions without the team knowing about it. She has proven to be an excellent athlete as well. In season 2 episode 7 she takes down a man three times her size, after he insulted her father, before the man could get a hit on her. She is the only main character (aside from Charlie) not to appear in every episode, having not been introduced until season 1 episode 2.
- Jimmi Simpson portrays Dr. Lloyd Lowery, a former child prodigy and a behaviorist with a bachelor's degree (1993) and M.D. (1997) from Harvard. He provides in-depth psychological evaluations of escaped convicts, which allow him to predict the movements and actions that an escaped convict may undertake before they get away. Lloyd also provides psychological help to Julianne and Erica on their various mental problems whenever possible. Ironically, Lloyd suffers from an addiction to gambling. His crime is not mentioned for most of the series, until he has to confront the families of one of his victims. To cover his gambling debts, he sold illegal prescriptions to college students, and took a plea bargain to surrender his medical license and serve 25 years in prison rather than face the parents of an 18-year-old girl with depression who overdosed on the pills he sold her. Throughout the series he has romantic feelings for Julianne and was at one point jealous of her feelings for Ray. In the episode "Ain't Love (50) Grand?", he told her that he is in love with her.
- Brooke Nevin portrays Julianne Simms, a former student at the Federal Law Enforcement Training Center. She was first in her class until she was expelled for her various psychological disorders which include social anxiety, panic disorder, and depression. Julianne acts as an analyst, researching and determining the various resources at the disposal of the convicts; such as family, money, and property they may use to aid their escape. She and Ray have a close relationship, even at one point showing romantic interest in Ray. As he was there for her when she was expelled, he requested that she be assigned to the task force. Julianne and Lloyd share a very friendly relationship since Lloyd willfully attempts to help her overcome her disorders. In turn Julianne cares for Lloyd and considers him a very important friend.

=== The fugitives ===
- In the episode "The Bag Man" of season one, Theodore "T-Bag" Bagwell (Robert Knepper) from the television series Prison Break appears as a fugitive who breaks out of prison to take revenge on the orderlies who wronged his mother.
- In the season 2 premiere episode "An Unjust Death", Damien Fontleroy (played by Jason Behr) kills Charlie Duchamp. Damien is killed by Ray after being pushed off the roof of a building and crashing into the roof of a car below in the season two finale "Served Cold".

== Development and production ==
Breakout Kings was originally in development for the Fox network. Matt Olmstead and Nick Santora wrote the pilot, after receiving a script commitment from Fox in August 2009. In January 2010, Fox greenlit a pilot episode. On May 12, 2010, it was announced that Fox did not pick up the series for the 2010–11 television season. Fox attempted to sell Breakout Kings to other networks, and in June 2010, it was reported that A&E had picked up the drama for 13 episodes.

Production was expected to begin in fall 2010 in Toronto for a 2011 premiere. Robert Knepper appeared as his Prison Break character T-Bag in episode 3 of season one. The other characters from Prison Break are also mentioned as "the Fox River 8" in that episode.

== Episodes ==
Season	Episodes	Originally released	
Season	Episodes	First released	Last released
1	13	March 6, 2011	May 30, 2011
2	10	March 4, 2012	April 29, 2012

== Broadcast ==
=== U.S. Nielsen ratings ===
The series premiered on March 6, 2011. It premiered as the most-watched original drama series in A&E's history among adults 25–54 and adults 18–49, delivering 1.6 million adults 25–54 and 1.5 million adults 18–49.

The series was picked up for a second season of 10 episodes on July 6, 2011 which premiered on March 4, 2012. The season finale of the second season aired on April 29, 2012 at 9 pm ET/PT featured two hours of back-to-back episodes "Freakshow" and "Served Cold" instead of the usual one-hour episode at 10 pm. One of the executive producer and creator Nick Santora once opined, "Our DVR+7-day numbers are really strong. A lot of people are watching the show; a lot of them just don't watch it on the night it premieres."

Season	Timeslot (ET/PT)	# Ep.	Premiered		Ended		TV season	Viewers (in millions)
Season	Timeslot (ET/PT)	# Ep.	Date	Premiere viewers (in millions)	Date	Finale viewers (in millions)	TV season	Viewers (in millions)
1	Sundays 10:00 pm	13	March 6, 2011	2.80	May 30, 2011	2.01	2011	1.89
2	Sundays 10:00 pm	10	March 4, 2012	2.12	April 29, 2012	1.33	2012	TBA

=== International distribution ===
Country	Channel	References
Australia	One HD	
Brazil	A&E Brasil	
Canada	CHCH A&E (TV channel)	
Finland	Sub	
Germany	RTL Crime	
France	TF1	
India	STAR World India	
Japan	Fox (Japan)	
Mexico	Azteca 7	
Netherlands	RTL Crime / RTL 5	
Norway	TV 2 Zebra	
Philippines	Chase (TV channel)	
Lithuania	TV3 Lithuania	
Poland	Fox (Poland)	
Portugal	Fox (Portugal)	
Slovakia	TV JOJ	
Spain	Fox Crime	
United Kingdom	Universal Channel (UK)	
New Zealand	TV3 (New Zealand)	
Slovenia	POP TV and FOX Crime	

=== DVD releases ===
DVD name	Region 1 release date	Region 4 release date	Ep #	Discs	Additional information
Breakout Kings: The Complete First Season	March 1, 2012	March 28, 2012	13	4	Bonus material includes Audio Commentary on selected episodes, Deleted and Extended Scenes, "Good Cons, Bad Cons" Featurette, Bullpen Sessions, and T Bag: Dealt a Bad Hand.

== Reception ==
On the review aggregator website Rotten Tomatoes, season one holds an approval rating of 41% based on 27 reviews, with an average rating of 4.70/10. The site's critical consensus reads, "Breakout Kings is a show that likes to take risks, but the execution is flat and other elements don't stand out from the rest of the procedural pack."

The Daily News's David Hinckley opened, "This is what cable dramas can do well: a simple, stripped-down, focused drama with characters we like." Jonathan Storm of The Philadelphia Inquirer wrote, "Breakout Kings, an exciting crime drama that adds to its appeal with some character types we don't often see, will attract a much wider audience, as our flawed heroes seek to round up escapees." Mary McNamara of Los Angeles Times opined that "Breakout Kings starts out with a promising blend of character and plot, action and dialog, sweet and savory". Maureen Ryan of Huffington Post opined that it "isn't a particularly creative drama but, as was the case with Prison Break in its early seasons, Breakout Kings is sustained by a workmanlike momentum. It has its share of clunky characters and predictable moments, but it also has a lot of earnest energy. It's enlivened by a terrific performance from Jimmi Simpson, who plays Lloyd Lowery, the show's all-purpose weirdo."

Rob Owen of Pittsburgh Post-Gazette wrote, "There are no television breakthroughs in Breakout Kings, a pretty pat procedural that tries a little harder than some of its predecessors. It has all the hallmarks of one of those shows that nobody talks about but plenty of people watch." Tim Goodman of The Hollywood Reporter opined, "Kings is mostly closed-ended with snippets of each con's past revealed in the episodes, so there's enough interest to keep the show moving. The leads' backstories might have some meat on the bone as well. It's not The Wire or The Shield but falls comfortably within that basic-cable safe zone where a little edge and bountiful entertainment pass the time just fine."

On the contrary, Hank Stuever of The Washington Post opined, "It doesn't work. There's a bit of banter well-delivered and some artful action, yet Breakout Kings lacks a certain vim and chemistry required for a real breakout series. It's all very quick but rather flavorless. They'll catch the escapee, no doubt, but they can't catch us." Robert Bianco of USA Today opined, "Breakout Kings is an uninspiring attempt by the producers and their network to be the last on the procedural match. It's stamped with many of the Prison hallmarks: the same affection for intricate plot mechanics, the same flair for the dramatic—and the same disdain for logic and character motivation." Variety's Brian Lowry wrote, "The premise doesn't really make much sense. It's a tough, competitive cable world out there, and as the cons might testify, coming away with a big score requires risks. By that measure, Breakout Kings doesn't do enough to stand apart, diminishing its chances of breaking out." Brian Ford Sullivan from The Futon Critic reviewed Breakout Kings in June 2010, calling the show a "violent version of Leverage" with colorful characters and a great performance by Jimmi Simpson as Dr. Lloyd Lowery, but with some inconsistencies like the character of Brooke Nevin and a bunch of ideas that don't quite fit."

To garner more publicity, the network screened the show for a number of reviewers in the weeks prior to official airing. One such review came out on SpoilerTV on February 22, 2011 and echoed Sullivan's initial problems with characterization and writing. Indications were that Breakout Kings seems to suffer from rough writing in the pilot, but there was slight improvement in a subsequent episode. However, the overall impression was that the flaws of the show may handicap its success. Echoing these issues, FlickDirect's review points out that character background or explanation is lacking in many cases.

== See also ==
- Prisoner's dilemma
