= Shooting Livien =

- Directed by: Rebecca Cook
- Screenplay by: Rebecca Cook
- Produced by: Rebecca Cook; Isen Robbins; Aimee Schoof
- Starring: Jason Behr; Sarah Wynter; Dominic Monaghan; Joshua Leonard; Ally Sheedy
- Cinematography: Harlan Bosmajian
- Edited by: Paul Zucker
- Production companies: Velveteen Films; Intrinsic Value Films
- Distributed by: TLA Releasing
- Release date: March 14, 2005 (South by Southwest)
- Running time: 90 minutes
- Country: United States
- Language: English

Shooting Livien is a 2005 American drama film written and directed by Rebecca Cook and starring Jason Behr, Sarah Wynter, Dominic Monaghan, Joshua Leonard and Ally Sheedy.

== Cast ==
- Jason Behr as John Livien
- Sarah Wynter as Emi Jackson
- Dominic Monaghan as Owen Scott
- Joshua Leonard as Robby Love
- Polly Draper as Rose Livien
- Ally Sheedy as Brea Epling
- Jay O. Sanders as Colin Livien

== Production ==
Principal photography occurred in November 2003 in New York.
