= Forest of the Dead (film) =

- Directed by: Brian Singleton
- Written by: Brian Singleton; Mark Singleton
- Starring: Chris Anderson; Brandi Boulet
- Distributed by: One Day in a Pasture Productions
- Release date: July 17, 2007
- Running time: 79 minutes
- Country: Canada
- Language: English

Forest Of The Dead is a 2007 horror film directed by Brian Singleton, starring Chris Anderson and Brandi Boulet.

== Plot ==
A group of young of adults stop at an old campsite to meet some friends, but they end up getting attacked by a strange presence in the woods. When their friends finally arrive, they discover their abandoned campsite and start looking for them, eventually being attacked by the undead remains of their former friends.

== Production ==
Forest of the Dead was shot on the outskirts of Ottawa, Ontario in 2001. The cast and crew reassembled in 2005 to shoot additional footage for the 2007 DVD release by Elite Entertainment.

== Release ==
Forest of the Dead was screened at the Fantasia International Film Festival in Montreal in 2006. It was released on DVD by Elite Entertainment on June 12, 2007.

== Reception ==
Tex Hula of Bloody Disgusting gave the film a score of 3/5 and, while critical of aspects like the acting and editing, called it "pretty freaking good" and concluded, "Forest of the Dead might not be the next Night of the Living Dead or Evil Dead or even The Dead Next Door, but it does share a great deal of brotherly bond with those films. They were all made outside the system by a group of people who were looking to entertain themselves and a very lucky audience—and entertain them they did." In a review written for CHUD.com, Ian Arbuckle gave the film a score of 3/10 and opined that, while Forest of the Dead did have an "admirable" amount of gore and showed potential and tenacity, it was otherwise an "awful movie" that was "shot in a carnival of different exposures, with unfunny jokes and bad acting." Steve Anderson of Film Threat condemned the film, writing, "This thing is only scary in the sense that, when you're done watching it, you're terrified that it may not come out of your DVD player and you'll be stuck watching it for the rest of your life." Peter Dendle, author of The Zombie Movie Encyclopedia Volume 2: 2000–2010, was similarly dismissive of the "tedious" film, noting, "It's all pretty unredeemable."
