= Domenick Lombardozzi =

American actor (born 1976)

- Born: March 25, 1976 (age 50); New York City, U.S.
- Occupation: Actor
- Years active: 1993–present

Domenick Lombardozzi (born March 25, 1976) is an American actor. He is best known for portraying the police officer Herc in The Wire, and is also known for his roles in Tulsa King (2022–2024), A Bronx Tale (1993), and The Irishman (2019).

Lombardozzi has also had lead roles in series such as Breakout Kings (2011–2012) and Rosewood (2015–2017). He also portrayed Gaitano "Guy" Russo in Reacher (2023–2024).

== Early life ==
Lombardozzi was born and raised in the Bronx, New York City. He was the third and youngest child of an Italian-American family. He was interested in baseball as a teenager, but answered a casting call for a movie set in his neighborhood, landing his first role with Robert de Niro.

== Career ==
Lombardozzi was cast in his first film role at age seventeen, when Robert De Niro cast him in A Bronx Tale in 1993, as a low level gun dealer named Nicky Zero. He then played small movie and TV roles for a decade, a period he describes as 'the grind', until being cast for HBO series The Wire as Thomas 'Herc' Hauk.

Lombardozzi continued being cast in 'tough guys' roles, including Ray Zancanelli on the A&E television series Breakout Kings, Tony Salerno in Martin Scorsese's The Irishman (2019), and Ralph Capone in Boardwalk Empire. He reunited with De Niro in 2013 in The Family.

== Filmography ==
=== Film ===
Year	Title	Role	Notes
1993	A Bronx Tale	Nicky Zero	
1997	Kiss Me, Guido	Joey Chips	
1998	54	Key	
1998	Side Streets	Police Officer One	
1999	Just One Time	Cyrill	
1999	For Love of the Game	Tow Truck Driver	
1999	The Young Girl and the Monsoon	Frankie	
2000	The Yards	Todd	
2001	Kate & Leopold	Counterman	Uncredited
2002	Love in the Time of Money	Eddie Iovine	
2002	Phone Booth	Wyatt	
2003	S.W.A.T.	GQ	
2005	Carlito's Way: Rise to Power	Artie Bottolota, Jr.	Video
2006	Find Me Guilty	Jerry McQueen	
2006	Freedomland	Leo Sullivan	
2006	Miami Vice	Detective Stan Switek	
2008	Sympathetic Details	Vincent	
2009	Public Enemies	Gilbert Catena	
2010	How Do You Know	Bullpen Pitcher	
2012	Life's a Beach	Schmitty	
2013	Blood Ties	Mike	
2013	The Family	Caputo	
2014	God's Pocket	Sal	
2014	The Gambler	Ernie	
2015	The Wannabe	Mickey	
2015	Entourage	Dom	Cameo
2015	Bridge of Spies	Agent Blasco	
2019	Cold Pursuit	Mustang	
2019	The Irishman	Anthony "Fat Tony" Salerno	
2020	The King of Staten Island	Firefighter Lockwood	
2021	Boogie	Coach Hawkins	
2022	Armageddon Time	Police Sergeant D'Arienzo	
2023	Reptile	Wally	

=== Television ===
Year	Title	Role	Notes
1999	Law & Order	Jason Vitone	Episode: "Ambitious"
2000	The Beat		Episode: "The Beat Goes On"
2000	Oz	Ralph Galino	2 episodes
2001	61*	Moose Skowron	Television film
2001	NYPD Blue	Max Legazi	Episode: "Johnny Got His Gold"
2001	Third Watch	Det. Barry Newcastle	Episode: "Childhood Memories"
2002–2008	The Wire	Thomas "Herc" Hauk	51 episodes
2004	The Jury	Marcus Peluso	Episode: "Too Jung to Die"
2005	Law & Order: Trial by Jury	Joe Petro	Episode: "Blue Wall"
2006–2008	Entourage	Dom	3 episodes
2007	The Man	Cueball	Television film
2008	Finnegan	Detective Tony Carbo	Television film
2008	SIS	Vic	Television film
2009	Law & Order: Criminal Intent	Frank Stroup	Episode: "Astoria Helen"
2010	24	John Mazoni	Episode: "Day 8: 6:00 p.m. – 7:00 p.m."
2010	Bored to Death	Eric	Episode: "The Gowanus Canal Has Gonorrhea!"
2011–2012	Breakout Kings	Ray Zancanelli	23 episodes
2013	Chicago Fire	Lucci	Episode: "A Hell of a Ride"
2013	Blue Bloods	Lt. Sutton	Episode: "Ties That Bind"
2013–2014	Boardwalk Empire	Ralph Capone	13 episodes
2014	The Michael J. Fox Show	Ted	Episode: "Party"
2014	Deadbeat	Mikey O'Shmidt	Episode: "Sixty Feet Under"
2015	The Good Wife	Bill Kroft	Episode: "Hail Mary"
2015	Daredevil	Bill Fisk	Episode: "Shadows in the Glass"
2015–2017	Rosewood	Capt. Ira Hornstock	43 episodes
2015–2017	Sneaky Pete	Abraham Persikof	2 episodes
2017	Doubt	Jerry	Episode: "Pilot"
2017	MacGyver	Gunman	2 episodes
2018	Somebody Feed Phil	Himself	Episode: "New York City"
2018–2022	Magnum P.I.	Sebastian Nuzo	5 episodes
2018–2019	Ray Donovan	NYPD Officer Sean "Mac" McGrath	10 episodes
2018–2019	Power	Benny Civello	5 episodes
2019	Yellowstone	Masked Man	Episode: "Resurrection Day"
2019	The Deuce	Jack Maple	4 episodes
2019	Mrs. Fletcher	George	5 episodes
2020–2021	Billions	Paul "Manz" Manzarello	2 episodes
2022	The Marvelous Mrs. Maisel	Mr. Bartosiewicz	Episode: "Rumble on the Wonder Wheel"
2022	We Own This City	Stephen Brady	Episode: "Part Three"
2022–2024	Tulsa King	Charles "Chickie" Invernizzi	Main cast (seasons 1–2); 14 episodes
2023–2024	Reacher	Gaitano "Guy" Russo	6 episodes
2025	High Potential	Gio Conforth	2 episodes
2026	Nemesis	Detective Dave Cerullo	7 episodes
