= Caroline Cheong =

Singaporean actress

Caroline Cheong is a Singaporean actress, known for making her movie debut as Victoria in the 2007 film The Tattooist.

== Education ==
Cheong studied at St. Margaret's Secondary School and LaSalle-SIA College of the Arts with a diploma in drama.

== Biography ==
Although Caroline has embarked on many TV productions for local television, she has also acted in many independent films. She quoted "Waking up" by Black Paper Productions as her proudest project to date. She has been on the cover of Eat! and FHM Singapore magazine twice. She was also in the top 100 sexiest women according to FHM magazine twice. Caroline is versatile in both film and on stage. She started off with acting onstage in black box productions and was later discovered and signed on with Fly Entertainment where she started her TV and film career.

In 2003, Cheong with Evelyn Ng and Diana Natalie, all from Fly Entertainment, formed a band, Cosmic Angels, to promote US makeup brand Tony & Tina.

In 2007, Cheong with Gerald Chew, acted in The Tattooist, a New Zealand-Singapore production.

Caroline has also hosted events for Seventeen and Lime magazine.

== Personal life ==
Cheong is born to a Chinese father and Portuguese mother. Born and bred in Singapore, she is now based in Hong Kong.

== Filmography ==
=== Film ===
| Year | Title | Role | Notes | Ref. |
|---|---|---|---|---|
| 2004 | Waking Up | | Black Paper Productions | |
| 2005 | Inspector X | | | |
| 2006 | When We Were Bengs | Jane Ho | | |
| 2007 | The Tattooist | Victoria | | |

=== Television ===
| Year | Title | Role | Notes | Ref. |
|---|---|---|---|---|
| 2002–2005 | Phua Chu Kang Pte Ltd | Lynette Khoo | | |
| 2003 | Light Years | Kimberly Lim Kim | | |
