= The Tattooist =

- The Tattooist film poster
- Directed by: Peter Burger
- Written by: Matthew Grainger; Jonathan King
- Starring: Jason Behr; Michael Hurst; Nathaniel Lees; Robbie Magasiva; David Fane
- Edited by: Paul Maxwell
- Production companies: Eyeworks Touchdown; Daydream Productions; MediaCorp Raintree Pictures
- Distributed by: Buena Vista International
- Release dates: October 2007 (Hof International Film Festival); 9 August 2007
- Running time: 92 minutes
- Countries: New Zealand; Singapore
- Languages: English; Samoan

The Tattooist is a 2007 New Zealand horror film directed by Peter Burger and starring Jason Behr, Nathaniel Lees, Michael Hurst and Robbie Magasiva among others. The film is the first in a series of official co-productions between New Zealand and Singapore.

== Plot ==
Jake Sawyer (Jason Behr) is a global wanderer and tattooist who explores ethnic themes in his designs. While visiting Singapore to sell his craft at a local trade show, he swipes an ancient Samoan tattoo tool. After flying to New Zealand to resume his art, he meets up with a lovely Samoan woman named Sina (Mia Blake) and discovers the local Samoan culture. But Jake slowly learns that his stolen tool ends up unleashing an evil avenging spirit whom targets all of the customers that Jake has given tattoos to since his theft of the tool. While attempting to learn pe'a, the Samoan tradition of tattooing, Jake soon realises that Sina is imperiled when she gets a tattoo from him and he must find a way to save her, and himself.

== Cast ==
- Jason Behr as Jake Sawyer
- Timothy Balme as Jake's Father
- Michael Hurst as Crash
- David Fane as Mr. Va'a
- Nathaniel Lees as Mr. Perenese
- Mia Blake as Sina
- Caroline Cheong as Victoria
- Robbie Magasiva as Alipati
- Matthew Ridge as Graham
- Stuart Devenie as Senior Doctor
- Jarred Blakiston as Young Jake Sawyer

== Production ==
Principal photography commenced on 16 September 2006 in Auckland, New Zealand, primarily at Studio West in West Auckland.

=== Soundtrack ===
The soundtrack contains music by The Mint Chicks, King Kapisi and Don McGlashan among others. The score is composed by Peter Scholes.

== Reception ==
Critical reception has been mixed to negative for The Tattooist. Common criticism centred on the film's pacing, as reviewers from sites such as DreadCentral felt that the movie's plot was too padded and the concept too thin for the 90-minute film length. Bloody Disgusting echoed the same sentiments and expressed frustration over The Tattooist, as they believed that the movie could have been "something fresh and original but instead mimicked a bunch of terrible films before it." Shock Till You Drop criticised what they saw as an overabundance of backstory and exposition, explaining that "Too much time spent on explaining 'why' works against sustaining a sense of disbelief and The Tattooist is especially ponderous in this regard." In a positive review, David Johnson of DVD Verdict stated the film is "a frantic, messy, nasty little horror flick and is worth checking out."
