= Brooke Nevin =

Canadian actress (born 1982)

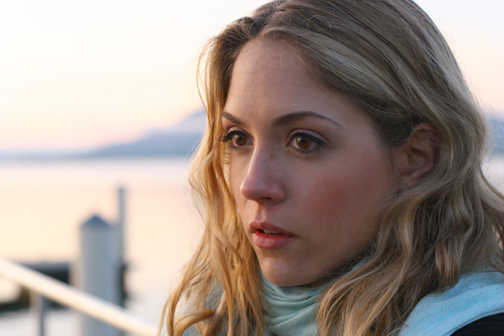
- Nevin on the set of Sherman's Way
- Born: Brooke Candice Nevin; December 22, 1982 (age 43); Toronto, Ontario, Canada
- Occupation: Actress
- Years active: 1996–present
- Partner: Michael Traynor (2005–present)
- Children: 1

Brooke Candice Nevin (born December 22, 1982) is a Canadian actress. She portrayed Rachel on the science fiction series Animorphs (1998–1999) Julianne "Jules" Simms (2011–2012) on Breakout Kings, and Sonja Lester (2010–2013) on Call Me Fitz. She was also a series regular on USA Network's The 4400 (2004).

== Biography ==
Nevin was born in Toronto, Ontario, to Monique and Bob Nevin, who was a professional hockey player. She has a younger sister named Kaleigh.

Since 2005, Nevin has been in a relationship with American actor Michael Traynor. Their son was born in April 2024.

== Filmography ==
=== Film ===
Year	Title	Role	Notes
1998	Short for Nothing	Dawn / Daughter	
2006	Comeback Season	Christine Pearce	
2006	I'll Always Know What You Did Last Summer	Amber Williams	Direct-to-video film
2007	One of Our Own	Marie	Scenes deleted
2007	The Comebacks	Michelle Fields	
2008	Sherman's Way	Addy	
2009	Archie's Final Project	Sierra Silver	
2009	Infestation	Sara	
2012	Alter Egos	Claudel	
2018	The Thinning: New World Order	Dr. Langley	
2020	Her Secret Family Killer	Sarah	
2021	Construction	Jessica	
2025	F*** Marry Kill	Valerie	

=== Television ===
Year	Title	Role	Notes
1996	Jonovision	Little Miss Muffet	Episode: "Phobias"
1997	Goosebumps	Erin	Episode: "A Shocker on Shock Street"
1998	Running Wild	Angela Robinson	Television film (Showtime)
1998	Real Kids, Real Adventures	Ashley Wiggins	Episode: "Lost on a Mountainside"
1998–1999	Animorphs	Rachel	Main role
1999	Are You Afraid of the Dark?	Dani	Episode: "The Tale of Bigfoot Ridge"
1999	Twice in a Lifetime	Young Katie	Episode: "Blood Brothers"
1999	Tales from the Cryptkeeper	Jan	Voice role; episode: "Too Cool for School"
2000	The Famous Jett Jackson	Cherilee	Episode: "Step Up"
2001	Haven	Terri Sayles	Television film (CBS)
2001	In a Heartbeat	Lissa	Episode: "The Boy's No Good"
2001	Doc	Blair	Episode: "Home Is Where the Heart Is"
2001	Loves Music, Loves to Dance	Anne Sheridan	Television film (ION)
2002	Guilty Hearts	Missy Carrow	Television film (CBS)
2002	I Love Mummy	Brenda Hadley	Main role
2002	Seriously Weird	Claudia Marinelli	unknown episodes
2003	Skin	Roxy	Episode: "Amber Synn"
2003	My Dad the Rock Star	Angela D'Angelo	Episode: "Angela D'Angelo"
2004	Strange Days at Blake Holsey High	Diana Music	Episode: "Allure"
2004	A Very Cool Christmas	Lindsay Dearborn	Television film
2004–2006	The 4400	Nikki Hudson	Recurring role; 7 episodes
2005	Without a Trace	Nell Clausen	Episode: "4.0"
2005	Charmed	Hope	Episode: "Little Box of Horrors"
2005	Head Cases	Madeline Barton	Episode: "S(elf) Help"
2005	Smallville	Buffy Sanders	Episode: "Thirst"
2005	Supernatural	Katherine	Episode: "Asylum"
2006	Everwood	Ellie	Episode: "An Ounce of Prevention"
2006	A Daughter's Conviction	Jo Hansen	Television film (Lifetime)
2006	My Boys	Traci	Episode: "Team Chemistry"
2007	Gravity	N/A	Unsold television pilot
2007	Grey's Anatomy	Tricia Hale	Episode: "Forever Young"
2008	Eli Stone	Molly Foster	Episode: "I Want Your Sex"
2008	My Name Is Earl	Kimmi's Daughter	Episode: "We've Got Spirit"
2008–2009	Worst Week	Chloe Clayton	Episodes: "The Monitor", "The Truck", "The Wedding", "The Party"
2008–2009	Imaginary Bitches	Brooke	Web series; main role
2009	Catherine & Annie	Lauren	Television film
2009	Come Dance at My Wedding	Cyd Merriman	Television film (Hallmark)
2009	NCIS	Rachael Sparks	Episode: "Code of Conduct"
2010	How I Met Your Mother	Amanda	Episode: "Say Cheese"
2010	'Til Death	Kelly	Episode: "Family Vacation"
2010	The League	Lily	Episode: "Bro-Lo El Cuñado"
2010–2013	Call Me Fitz	Sonja Lester	Recurring role; 27 episodes
2011–2012	Breakout Kings	Julianne Simms	Main role
2012	Underwater	Veronica	Episode: "You Got Perspective?"
2012, 2014–15	CSI: Crime Scene Investigation	Maya	4 episodes
2013	Chicago Fire	Tara Little	4 episodes
2013	Cracked	Dr. Clara Malone	Main role (season 2)
2014	Motive	Heather Williamson	Episode: "Bad Blonde"
2014	Perception	Shelby Coulson	Episodes: "Prologue", "Silence", "Dirty"
2015	Signed, Sealed, Delivered: From Paris with Love	Caitlin	Television film (Hallmark Movies & Mysteries)
2015	Stolen from the Suburbs	Anna	Television film (Lifetime)
2015	Longmire	Nikki	Episode: "Four Arrows"
2015	Major Crimes	Mrs. Palmer	Episode: "Taking the Fall"
2015	On the Twelfth Day of Christmas	Maggie Chalke	Television film (Hallmark)
2016	Hometown Hero	Kelsey	Television film (PixL)
2016	Quantum Break	Emily Burke	4 episodes
2016	Scorpion	Linda	Recurring role (season 2)
2016	Film School Shorts	Ari	Episode: "Future"
2016	Journey Back to Christmas	Sarah	Television film (Hallmark)
2017	The Wrong Mother	Vanessa	Television film (Lifetime)
2017	The Christmas Cure	Vanessa Turner	Television film (Hallmark)
2017	Lethal Weapon	Sara Burns	Episode: "Dancing in September"
2018, 2022	S.W.A.T.	Ally	Episodes: "Blindspots", "Albatross"
2018	Carter	Winter Wood	Episodes: "The Flood", "Koji the Killer"
2018	Jingle Around the Clock	Elle	Television film (Hallmark)
2018	Peaked in High School	Charlotte	Unsold television pilot
2020	Council of Dads	Lauren	Episodes: "Who Do You Wanna Be?", "Dear Dad", "Stormy Weather"
2021	Crashing Through the Snow	Kate Reynolds	Television film (Hallmark)
2021	It Takes a Christmas Village	Alexandra Foster	Television film (Hallmark)
2021	Sweet as Maple Syrup	Rachelle Beaumont	Television film (Hallmark)
2022	Magnum P.I.	Emily Pratt	Episode: "Dream Lover"
2022	Meet Me in New York	Kelly	Television film (Great American Family)
2022–24	Good Trouble	Ryan Jones	Recurring role; 7 episodes
2024	Tracker	Patti Palmer	Episode: "Ontological Shock"

== Awards and nominations ==
Year	Award	Category	Production	Result	Refs
1999	Young Artist Awards	Best Performance in a TV Movie/Pilot/Miniseries or Series - Supporting Young Actress	Running Wild	Nominated	
2009	Daytime Emmy Awards	New Approaches - Daytime Entertainment	Imaginary Bitches	Nominated	
2011	Gemini Awards	Best Ensemble Performance in a Comedy Program or Series	Call Me Fitz	Nominated	
2011	Gemini Awards	Best Performance by a Lead Actress in a Continuing Role in a Comedy Series	Call Me Fitz	Nominated	
2011	Golden Nymph	Outstanding Actress - Comedy Series	Call Me Fitz	Nominated	
