= Amateur Porn Star Killer (film series) =

American film series

Amateur Porn Star Killer is an American horror film series, currently consisting of three films. Created by Shane Ryan, the original film was theatrically released in 2007.

== First film ==
The first chapter of the series is a mockumentary about a snuff film shot, mainly consisting in a confrontation between the director of the snuff (played by the same Shane Ryan) and his 13-years-old victim (Michiko Jimenez). According to Ryan, it was filmed in one weekend. The film received mixed reviews. According to the book From the Arthouse to the Grindhouse, the film is "a postmodern take on the transgressive reality film, using the genre's format as a position from which to critique it". DVD Verdict's critic Gordon Sullivan panned the film, writing that it could be interesting as a 15-minute short, and referring to it as "boring" and lacking both "a competent audiovisual scheme and a compelling narrative".

== Sequels ==
Amateur Porn Star Killer 2, released in 2008, and Amateur Porn Star Killer 3: The Final Chapter, released in 2009, reprise the scheme of the first film, with just two actors, the snuff director and the victim, on scene. Film Threat's review of the second film said, "Ryan has, once again, created something bound to raise eyebrows and the ire of morality police everywhere. He makes no apologies for it, and he does it so well that if you go into the film with an open mind you can’t help but be impressed by how good a job he’s done."

The final chapter of the film features the real pornstar Regan Reese as main actress. It was filmed in 3D. While the previous two films were shot in motel rooms, this was set in the front seat of a SUV.
