= Skinwalkers (2006 film) =

Action horror film by James Isaac

- Theatrical release poster
- Directed by: James Isaac
- Written by: James DeMonaco; Todd Harthan; James Roday
- Produced by: Dennis Berardi; Don Carmody
- Starring: Jason Behr; Elias Koteas; Rhona Mitra; Kim Coates; Natassia Malthe; Sarah Carter; Lyriq Bent
- Cinematography: David A. Armstrong; Adam Kane
- Edited by: Allan Lee
- Music by: Andrew Lockington
- Production companies: Constantin Film; Red Moon Films; Stan Winston Productions
- Distributed by: After Dark Films; Freestyle Releasing (United States); Constantin Film (Germany)
- Release dates: May 22, 2006 (Cannes); August 10, 2007 (New York & Los Angeles)
- Running time: 91 minutes
- Countries: United States; Canada; Germany
- Language: English
- Box office: $3.2 million

Skinwalkers is a 2006 action horror film. It was released in the United States by Lions Gate Entertainment and After Dark Films, and focuses on werewolves. Directed by James Isaac, it stars Jason Behr, Elias Koteas, Rhona Mitra, and Tom Jackson. The film was originally announced for theatrical release on December 1, 2006, but was delayed until August 10, 2007.

Skinwalkers marks Lions Gate Entertainment's first collaboration with Constantin Film, which produced such other science fiction/horror films as Resident Evil and Wrong Turn. The visual effects are by effects house Mr. X, and the creature effects by Stan Winston Studio.

The film was shot at Century Manor in Hamilton, Ontario, Canada, and in Creemore Ontario. To achieve a PG-13 rating, the production team cut several scenes containing graphic violence — the home media release is the uncut version of the film.

== Plot ==
Two packs of werewolves, divided by principles, are signaled by the moon of the coming of an ancient prophecy. A boy named Timothy approaches his 13th birthday, unaware this marks the time of his transformation. He has been raised by his grandmother Nana, his mother Rachel, his uncle Jonas, his cousin Katherine and Katherine's boyfriend, Adam. His father is said to be dead.

Rachel and Timothy have been unaware that the rest of the family are "good" werewolves who have guarded Timothy and his secret since birth. They know that he is a "half-blood" who is prophesied to end the curse. But they also know that his power will put him in danger, for other werewolves embrace their blood-lust and are bent on killing the boy. Four of these werewolves are a motorcycle pack—leader Varek, and cohorts Zo, Sonya, and Grenier, who use a hawk as an airborne spy—who track down Timothy in the small town of Huguenot.

Varek discovers the location of Timothy. Reaching Huguenot, he sees Nana and Timothy and proceeds with a gunfight between his pack against the "good" werewolves and various townspeople. Adam's father is killed, and Nana sacrifices herself to let Timothy and the others escape. Jonas explains the situation to Rachel and Timothy, and they are convinced after Jonas and others turn into werewolves at night.

The next day, Timothy faints and is sent to a hospital. Varek's gang infiltrate the hospital and attack Timothy. Grenier is killed by Adam while Katherine is being held hostage by Varek. It is revealed that Varek was Caleb, Rachel's husband and Timothy's father, who was abducted and forcibly turned into Varek during an attack when Timothy was a baby.

After escaping, Adam finds Katherine and brings her back. At sundown, Katherine was discovered to have been forced to feed on humans and kills Adam with his own gun. Just as Katherine is about to attack Timothy, Jonas kills her with a gunshot in the back.

They find their next safe place, with Rachel and Timothy hiding in a steel cage while Jonas sets out to ambush Varek, Zo, and Sonya. Zo is killed after being trapped and dropped from a height. Sonya tries to attack Rachel and Timothy but is shot by Timothy. Rachel then finishes Sonya off. Varek tries to kill Timothy but is stopped by Jonas. They struggle, and Jonas feeds on Varek's arm and knocks him unconscious. Taken over by the blood frenzy, Jonas attempts to attack Timothy but is shot to death by Rachel. Varek wakes up and bites Timothy, but the clock chimes midnight. He is struck by Rachel and knocked to the ground. As Rachel and Timothy approach him, they witness him transform back into Caleb, revealing that Timothy's blood is the cure. Timothy and Rachel rush to Caleb's side and share an emotional reunion.

Later they are shown traveling around administering the cure to those who want it while using bullets filled with Timothy's blood on those who attack them. The film leaves off with Timothy saying, "For some I am salvation, for the others their destruction.”

== Cast ==
- Jason Behr as Varek—Formerly Caleb, Jonas's brother and Rachel's husband. Now the leader of the evil werewolves. He turns out to be the father of Timothy. He is cured at the end of the film and reverts to his old normal self, reuniting with his wife and son.
- Elias Koteas as Jonas—The Alpha of the pack sworn to protect Timothy, and father of Katherine. Like the others, he keeps himself restrained on the full moon and wants their curse to finally end. He is shot and killed by Rachel after trying to attack Timothy towards the end of the film.
- Rhona Mitra as Rachel Talbot—An assumed widow hard-pressed to cope with her frail son Timothy's frequent illnesses. She doesn't know her family and community is made up of werewolves.
- Natassia Malthe as Sonja—The Alpha female in Varek's pack, and his mate. She was once human, with a seemingly miserable life until changed by Varek. She is very neurotic, completely loyal to Varek, and obsessed with him. She is shot and killed by Rachel after being weakened by a shot from Timothy.
- Kim Coates as Zo—The second in command in Varek's pack. He is attacked by Jonas during the climax and falls to his death.
- Sarah Carter as Katherine—Jonas's daughter and, like the rest of the family and friends, a werewolf as well. She has a boyfriend named Adam. Towards the end of the film, she turns against and kills Adam and almost attacks Timothy but is shot in the back and killed by Jonas.
- Tom Jackson as Will
- Matthew Knight as Timothy Talbot—A half-blood, the offspring of Varek and Rachel. He holds the power to end the 'curse' of his family and the entire werewolf race along with him.
- Rogue Johnston as Grenier—One of Varek's henchmen. He is mute and has a heavily scarred face. He is shot and killed by Adam.
- Barbara Gordon as Nana—Timothy's grandmother. She is killed during the firefight between the "bad" and the "good" werewolves.
- Shawn Roberts as Adam—Katherine's boyfriend, who is also a lycanthrope. He is shot and killed by Katherine, his girlfriend.

== Release ==
Lionsgate purchased the American distribution rights and international sales rights to Skinwalkers in 2005 and was selling international rights to the film at the Cannes Film Festival in all territories except Germany. The film was scheduled for release in 2006. The film premiered in Los Angeles and New York on 10 August 2007.

The film was not widely released, appearing at its peak on 745 screens during the course of its 2 1/2 week run. The film grossed $553,520 on its opening weekend in the US and a total of slightly more than $1 million domestically. The film grossed $2.5 million worldwide.

== Reception ==
On review aggregator website Rotten Tomatoes the film has an approval rating of 11% based on 37 reviews, with an average rating of 3.5/10. The site's critical consensus reads, "Skinwalkers is an atrociously-acted project whose unoriginal and ineptly-staged action sequences remind viewers of far better werewolf and action movies." Metacritic, which uses a weighted average, assigned the film a score of 33 out of 100, based on 11 critics, indicating "generally unfavorable" reviews.

Skinwalkers had no advance screenings for critics, though Lionsgate did provide DVD screeners to those who asked. Maitland McDonagh of TVGuide.com noted that "the emphasis is more on conventional action than on man-to-wolf metamorphosis effects and the subsequent beastly mayhem," and said the movie was "briskly paced and features a couple of clever twists on genre conventions before getting bogged down". Frank Lovece of Film Journal International said that, "Before flagging toward the end to become a second-rate Terminator 2, this Canadian-made action drama sparks an old-fashioned B-movie charge—it's welcome-to-the-grindhouse all over again with such delicious conceits as a town of werewolf-citizens and a pistol-packing grandma going it gangsta-style". Despite the praise given to the creature effects by Stan Winston, the film received mostly negative reviews.

== DVD release ==
In Canada and worldwide, the film was released in its uncut form in the theaters and on DVD. In the USA however, the film was edited from an R-rating down to a PG-13 for its theatrical and DVD release.

The DVD was released on November 27, 2007. It includes a director's commentary, digital effects comparisons, a previsualization featurette, deleted scenes, the original theatrical trailer, a making of featurette, and additional Lionsgate film trailers to The Monster Squad, Fido, Fangs, and The Descent. There is no "unrated" or director's cut of the film available in the United States.
