= Jason Behr =

American film and television actor

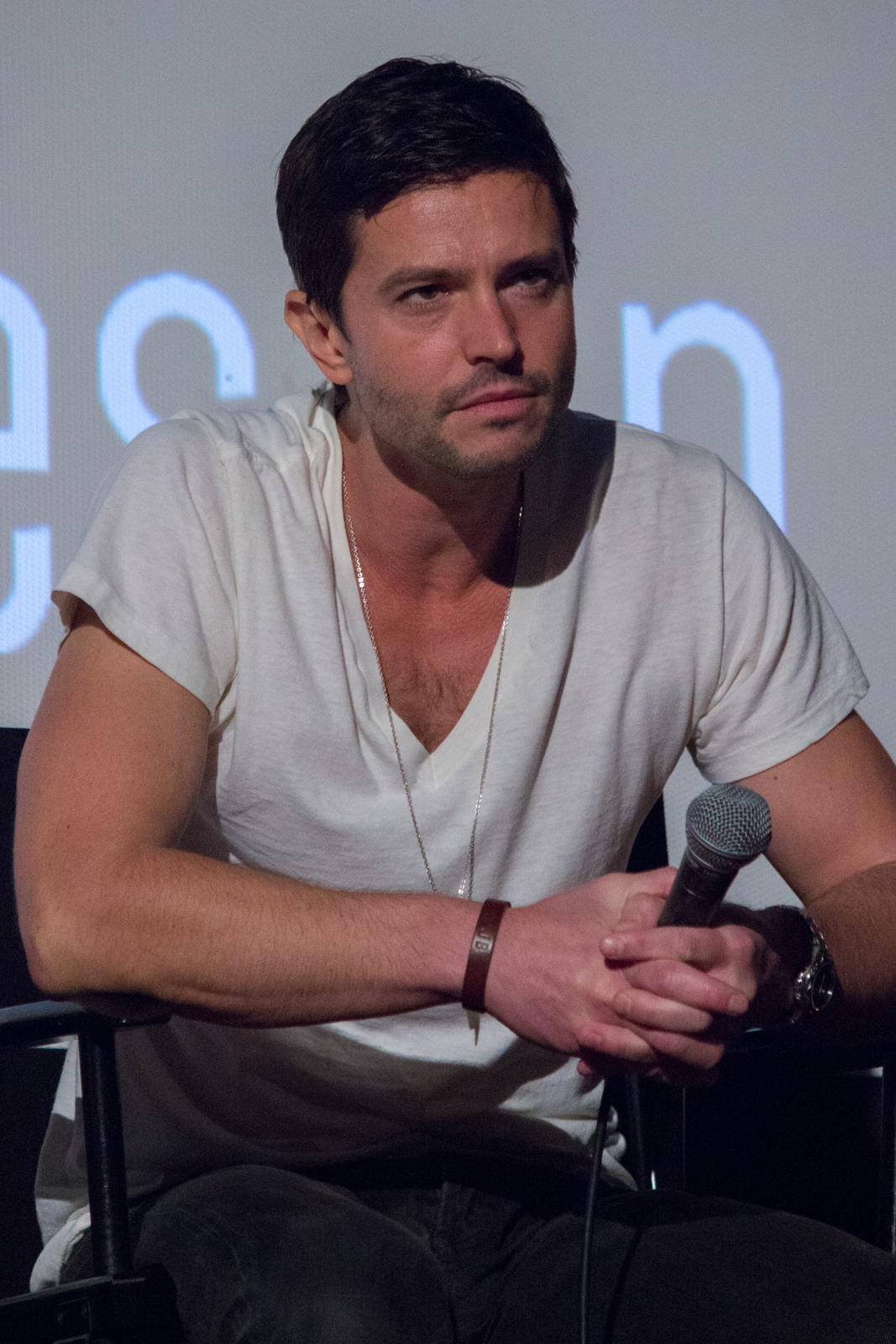
- Behr at the ATX TV Festival 2014 for Roswell
- Born: December 30, 1973 (age 52); Minneapolis, Minnesota, U.S.
- Occupation: Actor
- Years active: 1994–2012; 2020–present
- Spouse: Katherine Dee Strickland (m. 2006)
- Children: 1

Jason Behr (born December 30, 1973) is an American film and television actor. He first starred in the American television series Roswell, for which he was twice nominated for a Saturn Award, followed by roles in the films The Shipping News and the American remake of the Japanese horror film The Grudge. Behr has also had a series of guest appearances in various television shows like Step by Step, The Profiler, 7th Heaven, Buffy the Vampire Slayer and JAG and had recurring roles in the American television series Dawson's Creek and Breakout Kings.

== Early life ==
The second of four boys, Behr was born in Minneapolis, Minnesota on December 30, 1973, to Patricia Ann Steiner and David Behr. After his parents' divorce, Patricia moved her sons to the suburb of Richfield, where Jason attended St. Richards Catholic Elementary, a private grade school.

Behr first started acting at the age of five when he participated in a school play as a sunflower. By age eight he was doing commercials for Stomper Trucks and modeling for local department stores. Behr continued to perform throughout his school years. In 1992 he graduated from Richfield Senior High School. At the age of 19, after a chance meeting with Hollywood manager Marvin Dauer in Minneapolis, Behr moved to Los Angeles. In his early acting career, he appeared in over 75 commercials, and in 1995 landed the role of Tyler Baker in the racy Showtime comedy series Sherman Oaks. It ran for two seasons until it was cancelled in early 1997.

== Career ==
After Sherman Oaks, Behr had a series of guest appearances in various television shows (Step by Step, The Profiler, 7th Heaven, Buffy the Vampire Slayer, JAG). He was cast in the ABC series Push, but the ill-fated show only aired a few times before being cancelled. Then Behr picked up a recurring role as the character Chris Wolfe in The WB's series Dawson's Creek. While filming the show in North Carolina, Jason read the script for a pilot called Roswell High — later shortened to Roswell — and felt an immediate affinity for the lead alien, Max Evans. Roswell had a moderately successful run on The WB for two seasons, then moved to UPN for its third and final season. While the show never hit it big in the ratings, the series had an extremely loyal fan base.

Since Roswell, Behr has taken on a variety of roles in independent films such as: Unsu Lee's Happily, Even After; Jefery Levy's Man of God, and Rebecca Cook's Shooting Livien. In 2001, he played Dennis Buggit in Lasse Hallstrom's The Shipping News, co-starring with Kevin Spacey, Judi Dench, Julianne Moore, and Cate Blanchett. He made a guest appearance in Buffy the Vampire Slayer in 1998, and was later reunited with leading actress Sarah Michelle Gellar in the hit Japanese/American film collaboration The Grudge. His two most recent film appearances were in the Korean CGI dragon fantasy D-War and Lions Gate's reinvention of the werewolf tale, Skinwalkers.

In the spring of 2006, Behr wrapped the CBS dramatic pilot, The Way, about a powerful New England family that uses witchcraft to further its business enterprises. Jason plays Michael Warden, the show's male lead, one of the family's children who is at the center of a sibling power rivalry. Jason is in good company with fellow castmates who include, Jane Alexander, Julia Ormond, Peter Strauss, Will Patton, and Andrew McCarthy. As of May 17, 2006, CBS announced its fall lineup — and The Way was not picked up. In May 2006, Behr wrapped Senseless, filmed in and around Glasgow, Scotland, for Matador Pictures, Circle of Confusion, Shoreline Entertainment, and in association with Plum Films; a dark chiller written by Simon Hynd, based on the book of the same name by Stona Fitch. Once again, Jason takes the lead, playing Eliott Gast, an American economist who is abducted in Europe by a shadowy anti-globalization group.

Senseless unfolds as an affluent business man (Jason Behr) finds himself the unwilling hostage to political extremists who brutally torture him for acts he has no recollection of ever committing.

Audiences of blood-thirsty home viewers fixate on their computer screens as his torment is streamed across the internet and delivers the most graphic and disturbing reality show ever to be broadcast.

Behr starred in the thriller The Tattooist, which cast him as a tattoo artist who becomes fascinated by the Samoan tatau tradition, but his desire to learn the ancient skill brings him into conflict and danger with the island mysticism and a deadly spirit is released as a result. The film was commercial director Peter Burger's feature film debut. Filming started in Auckland, New Zealand, in September 2006, and finished in early November 2006. It was released in New Zealand on 30 August 2007.

In April 2007, Behr began shooting his new film project Frost (since renamed The Last International Playboy). The film made its debut at the Gen Art film festival in New York City in April 2008, with its nationwide theatrical release on June 12, 2009.

In October 2019, it was revealed at the New York Comic Con that Behr would have a recurring part in Roswell, New Mexico in an undisclosed role.

In March 2021, it was announced that Behr would have a recurring role in Supergirl in an undisclosed role. This role turned out to be Zor-El who was previously portrayed by Robert Gant in season 1 and season 2.

== Personal life ==
Behr previously dated his Roswell co-star Katherine Heigl. While shooting The Grudge in Japan, he met actress Katherine Dee Strickland, whom he married on November 10, 2006, in Ojai, California. They have a son, born October 2013.

== Filmography ==
Film roles
Year	Title	Role	Notes
1998	Pleasantville	Mark's Lackey #2	
1999	Rites of Passage	Campbell "Cam" Farraday	
2001	The Shipping News	Dennis Buggit	
2004	Happily Even After	Jake	
2004	The Grudge	Doug McCarthy	
2005	Man of God	Ben Cohen	
2005	Shooting Livien	John Livien	
2007	Skinwalkers	Varek	
2007	D-War	Ethan Kendrick	
2007	The Tattooist	Jake Sawyer	
2008	The Last International Playboy	Jack Frost	
2008	Senseless	Eliott Gast	

Television roles
Year	Title	Role	Notes
1994	Step by Step	Larry	Episodes: "Something Wild", "I'll Be Home for Christmas"
1995	Sherman Oaks	Tyler Baker	Main role, 34 episodes
1996	Alien Nation: Millennium	Randy	Fox TV movie
1996	Pacific Blue	Jack	Episode: "Genuine Heroes"
1997	JAG	Midshipman Danvers	Episode: "Ghosts"
1997	Profiler	The Waiter	Episode: "Crisis"
1997	Cracker	Andrew Lang	Episode: "Lemmings Will Fly"
1997	Buffy the Vampire Slayer	Billy "Ford" Fordham	Episode: "Lie to Me"
1997	7th Heaven	Brian Heaz	Episode: "Truth or Dare"
1998	Push	Dempsey Easton	Main role, 8 episodes
1998–1999	Dawson's Creek	Chris Wolfe	Recurring role, 6 episodes
1999–2002	Roswell	Max Evans	Lead role, 61 episodes
2006	The Way	Michael Warden	Unsold CBS TV pilot
2007	Company Man	Paul Fisher	Unsold Fox TV pilot
2010	Matadors	Gabriel Lodari	Unsold Fox TV pilot
2012	Breakout Kings	Damien Fontleroy	Recurring role (season 2), 5 episodes
2020	Roswell, New Mexico	Tripp	Recurring role (season 2); 5 episodes
2021	Supergirl	Zor-El	Recurring role (season 6); 5 episodes

== Awards and nominations ==
Year	Award	Category	Work	Result
2000	Saturn Awards	Best Genre TV Actor	Roswell	Nominated
2000	Teen Choice Awards	Choice TV Actor	Roswell	Nominated
2001	Saturn Awards	Best Actor on Television	Roswell	Nominated
2001	Teen Choice Awards	Choice TV Actor	Roswell	Nominated
2002	Young Hollywood Awards	Standout Performance by a Young Actor – Male	The Shipping News	Won
