= Lexi Alexander =

German Palestinian television director

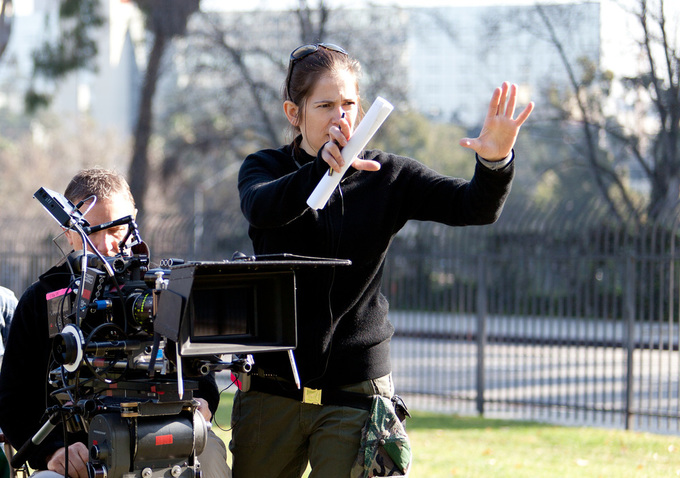
- Lexi Alexander in 2015
- Born: Alexandra Mirai; 23 August 1974 (age 52); Mannheim, West Germany
- Other name: Lexi Mirai
- Citizenship: United States
- Occupations: Director; martial artist
- Years active: 2002–present
- Website: lexi-alexander.com

Alexandra Mirai (Arabic: الكسندرا ميراي; born 23 August 1974), known professionally as Lexi Alexander, is a German-Palestinian-American filmmaker, and martial artist. A former competitor in karate-point fighting and kickboxing, Alexander entered the film industry as a stunt performer, before earning an Academy Award nomination for her debut short film Johnny Flynton (2002). She subsequently directed Green Street (2005), a crime drama about British football hooliganism, and Punisher: War Zone (2008), an adaptation of the Marvel Comics character of the same name.

== Early life and education ==
Alexander was born Alexandra Mirai in Mannheim, Germany, to a German mother and a Palestinian father. She grew up in Mannheim. Alexander's father was born and raised in Ramallah, Palestine.

As a teenager, Alexander was a member of Mannheim City Boys, a soccer hooligan group, which was part of the inspiration for Green Street Hooligans.

== Career ==
=== Martial arts and stunt work ===
Alexander began studying martial arts, specifically judo, when she was 8 years old. At 14, she switched to Shotokan karate. She has a third-degree black belt in karate.

Alexander excelled at kickboxing, where after two years in the sport, she joined the German National Team. She won the German point fighting championships four times and the European championships two times.

In 1994, at the age of 19, Alexander became the World Kickboxing Association world champion in karate-point fighting in Atlantic City.

At the age of 19, she retired from professional fighting and moved to the United States. Alexander had met Chuck Norris at a kickboxing event in the United States and she had previously acted in small roles in German TV. Norris encouraged her to come to Hollywood to act and study filmmaking. He was one of her sponsors for immigration.

With the assistance of martial artist Pat Johnson, she landed the part of Kitana in Mortal Kombat: Live Tour, and in 1995 and 1996, spent seven months on tour.

Alexander went on to work steadily as a stunt person doing fighting stunts and motorcycles, falls from high-rise buildings, going on to learn precision driving and race car driving. She also worked as an unarmed combat instructor for the United States Marine Corps in 1994.

=== Filmmaking ===
Alexander studied acting in Los Angeles at Joanne Baron's acting school learning Meisner technique and with acting coach Piero Dusa. She took extension classes in filmmaking at University of California, Los Angeles.

The first film Alexander directed was called Johnny Flynton, a short film that was nominated for an Academy Award in 2003. She said that the film, about a boxer from Alabama who is charged with murder, is a fictional story that was inspired by meeting a boxer in Germany when she was 9 years old, an interaction that she remembered and was the basis of the idea for the film. The film was self-financed by Alexander and had a budget of US$35,000 and was filmed in 5 days.

In 2005, Alexander directed her first full-length feature film called Green Street, also known as Green Street Hooligans, or Hooligans. The independent film starred Charlie Hunnam as soccer hooligan Pete Dunham, Elijah Wood as Matt Buckner, Claire Forlani as Shannon, Marc Warren as Steve, and Leo Gregory as Bover, and was produced by Gigi Pritzker and Deborah Del Prete.

Green Street Hooligans was inspired by her experience growing up watching her family's favorite German soccer team Waldhof Mannheim, which led to a fascination with the sport and its passionate fans. Inspired by this, Alexander co-wrote a screenplay with a former soccer hooligan turned writer, Dougie Brimson, and Joshua Shelov based on a story by Alexander and Brimson about the firm of West Ham United.

Released in 2005, Green Street Hooligans was only the second in the history of the South by Southwest festival to win both the Jury Award for Best Narrative Feature and Audience Award for Narrative Feature, after Alex Holdridge's Sexless in 2003.

In 2008, Alexander directed the film Punisher: War Zone starring Ray Stevenson as the Punisher. She was the first woman to direct a Marvel adaptation and it was her first studio film. At the time of its release, the film was considered a commercial and critical failure. The film has since become considered a cult classic. Comedian Patton Oswalt was an early and vocal defender of the film.

Alexander has been outspoken about her experience with Punisher. The film's budget shrank considerably, and Alexander wanted to work on a studio film so she said she was hired at a low rate. Then, during marketing, that budget was also low, and, in her opinion, the Christmas release date a mis-step. She also mentioned that due the film developing a cult following, she's since mainly been optioned scripts with extreme levels of violence, which she passes on because she's naturally "squeamish."

In 2010, Alexander wrote and directed the straight-to-video film Lifted, shot in Alabama, which had themes of Christianity. The film starred Dash Mihok, Nicki Aycox and Uriah Shelton. Lifted tells the story of a son's difficulty with his father's deployment in Afghanistan as a Marine, and features musical performances by Shelton and Mihok.

In 2012, Alexander directed an episode for Anthony Zuiker's BlackBoxTV YouTube channel entitled "Execution Style."

In 2014, the higher profile Alexander received from her advocacy work speaking out about gender parity in Hollywood on Twitter led to Alexander getting hired to direct episodic television. In 2015, Alexander directed an episode of the TV series, Arrow, called "Beyond Redemption." In 2016, she directed an episode of the TV series, Supergirl, called "Truth, Justice and the American Way," In 2016, Alexander also directed an episode of the TV series Limitless called "A Dog's Breakfast." In 2017, she directed an episode of the TV show Taken called "Hail Mary."

In 2016, it was reported that she would be directing a biopic called Crossface about the life of Canadian professional wrestler Chris Benoit. However, in January 2020, Benoit's son David stated that the project had been cancelled.

In February 2018, it was announced that Alexander was working on a TV series for Blumhouse Productions called You Bury Me, intended to be a war-torn love story set in modern-day Iraq, Syria and Turkey.

In June 2018, Alexander was invited to join the Academy of Motion Picture Arts and Sciences.

Alexander has a long-term working relationship with martial artist Pat Johnson, who she has hired as a stunt coordinator and choreographer since starting her directing her career. Alexander is a fan of film director Euzhan Palcy.

== Advocacy ==
In early 2014, on her Twitter feed and in a blog post that was republished and widely discussed, Alexander discussed the lack of women directors in Hollywood and lifted back the curtain on the lack of gender parity in the entertainment industry. Alexander has been outspoken on Hollywood sexism and has spoken at length about the directorial opportunities she says were denied to her because of her gender. In a 2014 interview she stated that she and director Catherine Hardwicke were denied a meeting to discuss possibly directing The Fighter, as the producers were not interested in hiring a woman to direct.

Alexander worked to support the American Civil Liberties Union investigation into gender bias in hiring practices, specifically for women directors, which cast a critical eye on the role of the Directors Guild of America. Film school graduates have gender parity, but once in the industry, the percentage of women hired ranges from 8% in 2017 to less than 6%. In 2015, Alexander testified about her experiences as part of an investigation by the Equal Employment Opportunity Commission on hiring practices in Hollywood.

Alexander has said she is against illegal file sharing but instead supports innovative file sharing over big businesses exploiting digital distribution models. Alexander has condemned the anti-piracy actions of the litigation and lobbying focused Hollywood entertainment industry especially regarding geoblocking, saying that "as a German living in the US it's difficult to get German news, and while in Germany it's difficult to get US shows." She said she approves of neither the millions Hollywood spends on anti-piracy efforts nor the wealth of Kim Dotcom "lining his own pockets". Alexander thinks the money used by the MPAA would be better spent improving diversity and more equitable distribution models. She does, however support Peter Sunde in relation to The Pirate Bay trial and fair use.

Alexander frequently advocates for Palestinian rights. In May 2025, she commented on the difficulty of promoting a film during the ongoing Gaza War and her evaluation of Hollywood as a place that promotes liberal ideas but not with respect to Palestine.

In September 2026 Alexander received criticism on social media after posting a meme in response to the fatal stabbing of Bank of America vice president Erin Piacenti. She explained her post by stating, "Israel doesn’t care about the woman who got killed, they care about the positive rating BofA gave them in the middle of a genocide. There is huge money at stake".

== Personal life ==
Alexander has metal screws in her knees from her time as a kickboxer.

As of 2017, Alexander has been practicing the Russian martial arts technique called Systema.

== Filmography ==
=== Film ===
| Year | Title | Director | Writer | Producer | Actress | Notes |
|---|---|---|---|---|---|---|
| 1997 | Executive Target | No | No | No | No | Production assistant (as Lexi Mirai) |
| 2001 | Pitcher Perfect | Yes | No | No | No | Short film |
| 2002 | Fool Proof | Yes | No | No | No | Short film |
| 2002 | Johnny Flynton | Yes | Yes | No | No | Short film |
| 2005 | Green Street Hooligans | Yes | Yes | Executive | No | |
| 2005 | Wheelman | No | No | Yes | No | |
| 2008 | Punisher: War Zone | Yes | No | No | No | |
| 2009 | Green Street 2: Stand Your Ground | No | Characters | Executive | No | |
| 2010 | Lifted | Yes | Yes | No | Yes | Role: Afghan Woman |
| 2025 | Absolute Dominion | Yes | Yes | Yes | No | |

=== Television ===
| Year | Title | Director | Writer | Producer | Actress | Notes |
|---|---|---|---|---|---|---|
| 1997 | Boy Meets World | No | No | No | Yes | Role: Sonya Blade; Episode: "Last Tango in Philly" |
| 2012 | BlackBoxTV | Yes | No | No | No | Episode: "AEZP: Execution Style" |
| 2015 | Arrow | Yes | No | No | No | Episode: "Beyond Redemption" |
| 2016 | Supergirl | Yes | No | No | No | Episode: "Truth, Justice and the American Way" |
| 2016 | Limitless | Yes | No | No | No | Episode: "A Dog's Breakfast" |
| 2016 | American Gothic | Yes | No | No | No | Episode: "Kindred Spirits" |
| 2017 | Taken | Yes | No | No | No | Episode: "Hail Mary" |
| 2017 | How to Get Away with Murder | Yes | No | No | No | Episode: "I Love Her" |
| 2018 | S.W.A.T. | Yes | No | No | No | Episode: "Day Off" |
| 2019 | L.A.'s Finest | Yes | No | No | No | Episode: "Thief" |
| TBA | You Bury Me | No | Yes | Executive | No | Pre-production |

=== Stunt work ===
- 1997: Batman & Robin

== Awards and nominations ==
- 1994: United States Marine Corps, Meritorious Service Award for Outstanding Service and Exemplary Performance of Duty, Trainer, Advisor to Marine Close Combat Instructor Staff
- 2003: Academy Award for Best Live Action Short Film (nominee) for Johnny Flynton – with Alexander Buono
- 2005: SXSW Film Festival, Jury Award for Best Narrative Feature for Green Street Hooligans
- 2005: SXSW Film Festival, Audience Award, Narrative Feature for Green Street Hooligans

== Selected writing ==
- Alexander, Lexi (14 January 2014). "An Oscar-Nominated Director Gets Real About How Women Are Treated in Hollywood". IndieWire.
- Alexander, Lexi (29 July 2014). "My Hell is for Hyphenates podcast about Euzhan Palcy". Lexi-Alexander.com.
- Alexander, Lexi (4 January 2016). "Crosspost: The Difficulties of Juggling Diversity Activism and a Directing Career in Hollywood". IndieWire.
- Alexander, Lexi (15 January 2016). "Make More Women and Minorities Members of the Motion Picture Academy". The New York Times.
- Alexander, Lexi (7 June 2018). "What time is it, Hollywood? Those whisper campaigns where you can anonymously ruin someone's Hollywood career forever need to stop. Now". The Tempest.
