= Dash Mihok =

American actor (born 1974)

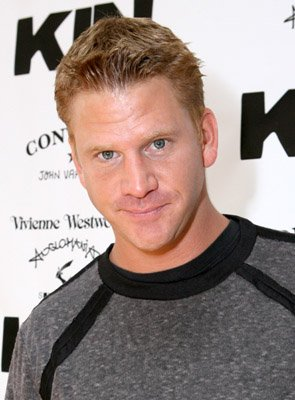
- Mihok in May 2007
- Born: Dashiell Raymond Mihok; May 24, 1974 (age 52); New York City, U.S.
- Other names: Diz Mihok; Diz and the Fam
- Education: Bronx High School of Science; Professional Children's School
- Occupation: Actor
- Years active: 1993–present
- Spouse: Valeria Mason (m. 2009)
- Children: 2
- Website: Diz and the Fam

Dashiell Raymond Mihok (/ˈmaɪhɒk/; born May 24, 1974) is an American actor. He is best known for his role as Brendan "Bunchy" Donovan in the Showtime series Ray Donovan.

== Early life ==
Mihok was born in New York City, the son of theater actors Andrea Mihok (née Cloak) and Raymond Thorne (né Mihok). He has two older sisters: Gwen Mihok, an actress, and Cecily Trenka, a science teacher. He is of Czech and British descent.

Mihok grew up in Greenwich Village and lived in the artist community Westbeth on Bank Street. Mihok went to PS 3, a public elementary school in Manhattan, currently named the John Melser Charrette School. He attended the Center School (MS 243) for middle school. While attending Bronx High School of Science, where he played baseball as a middle infielder, Mihok joined CityKids Repertory, and appeared in the short-lived TV show, CityKids, which featured local New York child actors and Jim Henson's The Muppets. Mihok also attended the Professional Children's School in Manhattan with best friend, actor Donald Faison.

== Career ==
=== Acting ===
Mihok got his start doing guest spots in local New York City productions of Law & Order, NYPD Blue, and New York Undercover. In 1994, Mihok debuted in the independent film, Black is White. In 1995, Mihok appeared in the CBS movie of the week, Murderous Intent.

In 1996, Mihok appeared in director Barry Levinson's film Sleepers, which was notable for its depiction of sexual abuse. The same year, Mihok also appeared in the Angelina Jolie film, Foxfire. His breakout role was in the Leonardo DiCaprio and Claire Danes-starring Romeo + Juliet. To prepare for his audition, Mihok studied Shakespeare and had five extensive audition sessions with director Baz Luhrmann before landing the role of Benvolio.

In 1998, for Terrence Malick's Thin Red Line, Mihok said he spent an intensive six months working on the film, with the amount of footage constituting a starring role, but during editing was reduced to an ensemble part as Private First Class Doll.

In 1996, Mihok was a featured regular in the role of Joey in the Rhea Perlman CBS sitcom Pearl. In 1999, he appeared on The WB series Felicity, where he portrayed Lynn, a competitive swimmer, in multiple episodes. He has been featured in roles in films such as The Day After Tomorrow, The Perfect Storm, I Am Legend, and Silver Linings Playbook. He has had starring roles in independent features such as Telling You and Loveless in Los Angeles.

In 2006, Mihok appeared in the film Hollywoodland and in 2007 in the film, Firehouse Dog. In 2008, he played Detective Martin Soap in the film Punisher: War Zone. In 2011, Mihok directed a short film called Abby. The film stars his sister, Gwen. He also directed the 2006 short film called That Guy.

As part of the 2011 straight-to-video film, Lifted, Mihok and the actor who plays his son in the film, Uriah Shelton, recorded a song called "I Miss You." The film features many musical and dance performances by Mihok. In 2013, Mihok portrayed the character "Gage" in Payday 2 web series.

From 2013 to 2020, Mihok co-starred as Brendan "Bunchy" Donovan in the Showtime drama Ray Donovan. Bunchy had been sexually abused by a priest as a child and is an alcoholic and has sexual anorexia. For the show the cast worked out at the Santa Monica, California boxing gym Wild Card West with boxer Rob Garcia. Mihok was slated to direct an episode in 2017, as he said he has been directing pilots to prepare. He directed the season 7 episode "An Irish Lullaby" which aired December 15, 2019.

In 2014, he portrayed Whelan, in the horror-thriller film, Before I Wake, co-starring in the Mike Flanagan-directed film Annabeth Gish, Thomas Jane and Kate Bosworth.

In 2016, Mihok appeared in the film, So B. It, which stars Alfre Woodard, Cloris Leachman, Jacinda Barrett, and John Heard. In 2017, Mihok appeared in the independent film, The Girl Who Invented Kissing, as Victor, a man who becomes mentally disabled after being in a car accident. He stars opposite Suki Waterhouse and Vincent Piazza, who plays his younger brother. In 2017, Mihok played a car salesman in the film Car Dogs, which features Patrick J. Adams, Octavia Spencer, Josh Hopkins, among others. In 2022, he played Derek, an intellectually disabled man, in Wildflower.

=== Music ===
When he was 12 years old, Mihok started a band with his friends called S.D.C. (Sam, Dash, Chris aka Strictly Devastating Crew).

In 2004, Mihok appeared on Sicilian-Puerto Rican New York-based rapper Sabac Red's record Sabacolypse: A Change Gon' Come, on the track "I Have A Dream." The lyrics refer to tics that people exhibit as symptoms of Tourette syndrome. For the 2005 movie Green Street Hooligans, Mihok wrote the title track "Test of a Man." During this time he also collaborated with Daniel Freedman, a jazz drummer, percussionist, and composer on various music projects.

Since 2015, Mihok has been in the band Diz and the Fam. Members of Diz and the Fam are Mike Choi, Kenny Echizen, Justin Frazier, Sharlotte Gibson, Morris Hayes, Joel Hellman, Brett Nolan, and Elliot Yamin. The band has released three singles. The 2015 video for Love (feat. Jeff Taylor) features many actors from Ray Donovan.

=== Other work ===
Mihok studied dance. He can be seen dancing opposite then-girlfriend Alanis Morissette in her music video "So Pure". Mihok is also a photographer. His photography of Morissette is used on the back cover of her "Thank U" single and is credited for Supposed Former Infatuation Junkie.

== Personal life ==
I'd say don't be afraid to tell people about your TS [Tourette's Syndrome]; don't hide it. The stress of hiding it is too much. If you're afraid that people won't understand, then they probably won't be in your life, anyway. Be as open as you can. It takes it off you and alleviates the worst of your TS. Don't be afraid. You can do anything you want to do. If you think you can, you can. There are top neurosurgeons with TS. The sky is the limit. Don't limit yourself.

— Dash Mihok, when asked what advice he'd give others with Tourette's

Mihok was named after writer Dashiell Hammett, the author of The Thin Man, The Glass Key and The Maltese Falcon. His Czech surname is pronounced "my"-Hawk.

Mihok was diagnosed with Tourette syndrome at age six, and is a spokesperson and is on the board for the nonprofit Jaylen's Challenge, founded by the then 9-year-old Jaylen Arnold. He is an active supporter of the Tourette Syndrome Association. Mihok's two older sisters both have Tourette's; it is often genetic.

Mihok once stated that an early reason he became an actor was because he had so much experience in hiding his Tourette's. He said the focus required of acting allows him to mask many of his tics. Mihok says the biggest misconception about Tourette Syndrome is about vocal tics, called coprolalia. Not everyone with Tourette's does that: "Tics tend to wax and wane, not everybody's screaming obscenities all the time." Mihok said he took medication during high school to treat Tourette's.

In 1997, Mihok met Alanis Morissette through mutual friend Leonardo DiCaprio during a trip to Cuba. The lyrics to the songs "So Pure" from Supposed Former Infatuation Junkie and "That Particular Time" from Under Rug Swept are about him.

In 2009, Mihok married singer Valeria Mason. They have two children and live in Los Angeles. Mihok has said that he is a Roman Catholic.

== Awards ==
- 1999: Satellite Awards, Special Achievement Award, Outstanding Motion Picture Ensemble for The Thin Red Line
- 2014: Tourette Association of America, Shining Star Award
- 2017: Beverly Hills Film Festival, Best Actor for The Girl Who Invented Kissing

== Filmography ==
=== Film ===
Year	Title	Role	Notes
1996	Foxfire	Dana Taylor	
1996	Sleepers	K.C.	
1996	Romeo + Juliet	Benvolio Montague	
1998	Telling You	Dennis Nolan	
1998	The Thin Red Line	Private First Class Doll	
1999	Whiteboyz	James	
2000	The Perfect Storm	Sergeant Jeremy Mitchell	
2001	The Journeyman	Walter P. Higgs III	
2001	Nailed	Danny McGooch	
2001	Finder's Fee	Bolan	
2001	One Eyed King	'Bug'	
2002	The Guru	Rusty McGee	
2002	Johnny Flynton	Johnny Flynton	Short
2002	Dark Blue	Gary Sidwell	
2003	Basic	Mueller	
2004	Connie and Carla	Mikey	
2004	The Day After Tomorrow	Jason Evans	
2004	Death Valley	Dominick 'Dom'	
2005	Kiss Kiss Bang Bang	Mr. Frying Pan	
2006	10th & Wolf	Junior	
2006	Hollywoodland	Sergeant Jack Paterson	
2007	Firehouse Dog	Trey Falcon	
2007	Sex and Death 101	Lester	
2007	Loveless in Los Angeles	Dave Randall	
2007	Superheroes	Ben Patchett	
2007	I Am Legend	Alpha Male	
2008	The Longshots	Cyrus	
2008	Punisher: War Zone	Detective Martin Soap	
2010	Lifted	William Matthews	
2011	The Mortician	Carver	
2011	The FP	Cody	Uncredited
2011	Trespass	Ty	
2011	On the Inside	Carl Tarses	
2012	Silver Linings Playbook	Officer Keogh	
2012	2nd Serve	Charles	
2014	Fort Bliss	Staff Sergeant Malcolm	
2015	Too Late	Jesse	
2016	Before I Wake	Whelan Young	
2016	Car Dogs	Scott	
2016	So B. It	Roy Franklin	
2017	The Girl Who Invented Kissing	Victor	
2017	Quest	Tim	
2018	A Million Little Pieces	Lincoln	
2019	Inherit the Viper	Kyle Knox	
2019	All Roads to Pearla	Oz Bacco	
2022	Deep Water	Jonas Fernandez	
2022	Wildflower	Derek	
2024	Junction	Matt	
2024	Armor	Smoke	
2026	Conspiracy of Thieves		

=== Television ===
Year	Title	Role	Notes
1993	CityKids		
1993	NYPD Blue		
1994	New York Undercover	Marcus	Episode: "School Ties"
1995, 2009	Law & Order	Ethan Quinn / Firefighter Walters	Episodes: "Performance" (1995) and "All New" (2009)
1995	Murderous Intent	Kevin	TV film
1996–1997	Pearl	Joey Cataldo	22 episodes
1999	Felicity	Lynn McKennon	7 episodes
2000	Live Girls	Brad	TV film
2003	Street Time	Randy Wiggins	Episodes: "Hostage" and "Anger Management
2004	CSI: Crime Scene Investigation	Will Marshall	Episode: "Dead Ringer"
2004	Hustle	Paul Janszen	TV film
2005	Confessions of a Dog		TV film
2007	Cavemen	Jamie	Episodes: "Pilot" and "Her Embarrassed of Cavement"
2007	Ghost Whisperer	Detective David Campbell	Episode: "No Safe Place"
2007	Pushing Daisies	Lemuel 'Lefty Lem' Weinger	Episode: "Pigeon"
2009	The Fish Tank	Lee	TV film
2009–2010	The Good Wife	Detective Frank Seabrook	Episodes: "Lifeguard" and "Infamy"
2010	Burn Notice	Jack Yablonski / Fleetwood	Episode: "Enemies Closer"
2010	How to Make It in America	Pete Powell	Episode: "Big in Japan"
2010	Human Target	Eddie Dunn	Episode: "Corner Man"
2010	Law & Order: Criminal Intent	Damon Kerrigan	Episode: "Love Sick"
2011	Paul the Male Matchmaker	James	Episode: "Dont' Be a Meanie"
2011	Prime Suspect	Detective Tachenko	Episodes: "Pilot" and "Carnivorous Sheep"
2011	Hawaii Five-0	Nick Drayton	Episode: "Kame'e"
2011	Grey's Anatomy	Clay Rolich	Episode: "Poker Face"
2012	Greetings from Home	Pete	12 episodes
2012	Breakout Kings	Jonah Whitman	Episode: "SEALd Fate"
2012	Blue Bloods	Eddie Stone	Episode: "Higher Education"
2013–2020	Ray Donovan	Brendan 'Bunchy' Donovan	82 episodes
2013	PAYDAY: The Web Series	Gage	2 episodes
2015	Gotham	Detective Arnold Flass	3 episodes
2015	Chicago P.D.	Jeff Frazier	Episode: "Actual Physical Violence"
2016	Hell's Kitchen	Himself	Episode: "Crepe Grand Prix"
2019	Whiskey Cavalier	Jimmy Coleman	Episode: "Spain, Trains, and Automobiles"
2021	Law & Order: Organized Crime	Reggie Bogdani	8 episodes
2022	Ray Donovan: The Movie	Bunchy Donovan	TV film
2023	Gossip Girl	Will	Episode: "Dress Me Up! Dress Me Down"
2023	Accused	FBI Agent	Episode: "NaaTaanii's Story"
2025	Long Bright River	Eddie Lafferty	7 episodes

=== Music videos ===
Year	Title	Artist	Ref.
1999	"So Pure"	Alanis Morissette	
2014	"Imagine" (UNICEF: World version)	Various	

=== Theater ===
- 1985: Romeo and Juliet by Sergei Prokofiev, American Ballet Theatre, Metropolitan Opera
- 1987: Carrying School Children by Thomas Babe, Theater for the New City

=== Miscellaneous ===
- Chakrabarti, Meghna; Mihok, Dash (October 5, 2016). "The Modern Love Podcast: Dash Mihok Reads 'A Path to Fatherhood, With (Shared) Morning Sickness'" (Audio podcast performance). The New York Times / WBUR Boston.

== Discography ==
- 2004: Sabacolypse: A Change Gon' Come by Sabac Red – track called "I Have A Dream" ft. Dash Mihok & Cenophia Mitchell
- 2005: "Test of a Man" by Dash Mihok – from the film Green Street Hooligans
- 2009: "I Miss You" by Uriah Shelton and Dash Mihok – from the film Lifted
- 2009: "Sunshine (Ft. Dash Mihok)" sung by Uriah Shelton featuring Dash Mihok – from the film Lifted
- 2015: "Stolen Hearts" by Dash Mihok – from Payday 2

DIZ and The Fam

- 2015: Love (feat. Jeff Taylor) – Single (DIZ Music Inc)
- 2015: The Evil That Men Do – Single (Diz and The Fam) – featured on Ray Donovan
- 2016: Be Better – Single (DZE Music)
