= Lifted (2010 film) =

- Directed by: Lexi Alexander
- Written by: Lexi Alexander
- Produced by: Deborah Del Prete
- Starring: Uriah Shelton; Dash Mihok; Nicki Aycox
- Cinematography: David Brower
- Edited by: Gregory Nussbaum
- Music by: Kurt Farquhar
- Production company: Listed Picture
- Release dates: August 14, 2010 (Feel Good Film Festival); August 9, 2011
- Running time: 108 minutes
- Country: United States
- Language: English

Lifted is a 2010 American drama film written and directed by Lexi Alexander, starring Dash Mihok, Nicki Aycox and Uriah Shelton. It premiered at the Feel Good Film Festival on August 14, 2010, and was released straight-to-DVD in 2011.

== Plot ==
Henry Matthews (Uriah Shelton) lives in a small town in Alabama with his parents, William (Dash Mihok) and Lisa (Nicki Aycox). His father is a garage mechanic, but is also in the Reserves, while his mother is unemployed, but goes to group-therapy sessions for a drug addiction. She has been clean for one year and four months. Henry is a middle-schooler, and deals with bullies after school, forcing him to eventually take refuge in the Baptist Church where Henry meets Pastor John (Ruben Studdard). Pastor John takes a liking to Henry when they begin to play worship music on the church's piano, and discovers Henry is a very talented singer. Pastor John gives Henry a flyer for the Alabama Teen Star Quest, a singing competition in Birmingham.

William's Reserve unit is activated and deployed to Afghanistan. While William is gone, Henry sends him songs to listen to, and to show off to his Marine buddies. While William is gone, Henry's mom cannot afford the mortgage on the house, and they move into Lisa's dad's trailer, without telling William. Lisa's dad hates the music Henry listens to and didn't agree with her marrying William. Henry skips school, but Lisa thinks he is gone. She begins to bike to her therapy session, but turns around. She walks to the neighbors and gets high, breaking her promise to William that she'd stay sober. Henry watches his mom get high out of the window, and unplugs his headphones from his radio. Lisa's dad returns and hits Henry for listening to his music and skipping school. He decides to leave and attend the competition. He tells his mom "bye," but she is too high to understand. Henry hitchhikes to Birmingham to enter the singing competition. His dad comes home while he's gone, and finds the house empty, and his wife high, then runs to Birmingham where he finds Henry and performs with him in the competition.

Henry gets far in the competition, and is covered on the news, where Lisa's dad sees him. Lisa and her dad go to Birmingham and find Henry. Lisa's father tells the competition officials that he hasn't had a parent with him the entire time. This confuses Henry, who is told his father died three months earlier. Henry looks at his dad, who says no one else can see him. His dad was killed by an Afghan woman back when he was deployed, but William's spirit was with Henry the whole time. Henry decides to drop out of the competition because his dad isn't there. William's spirit then visits his friend for his unit. The friend's remote breaks on the channel talking about Henry and he reads a letter William gave him. The letter tells him to help Henry in the competition if he ever dies. Back at the competition Henry can't sing because his dad is gone. The judges eliminate him but one of the other singers quits and let Henry have his place. Together Henry and William's friend win the competition and are offered a chance to meet with a record company in Los Angeles.

== Cast ==
- Uriah Shelton as Henry Matthews
- Nicki Aycox as Lisa Matthews
- Dash Mihok as William Matthews
- Trace Adkins as Jimmy Knox
- Thad Mickler as Jeb
- Craig Lembke as Konoa
- Ruben Studdard as Pastor John
- Kymrence Young as herself
- Todd Simpson as himself
- Howard Green as Carl
- Barbara Kincaid-Hill as Mrs. Declaire
- James Handy as Travis
- Danny Vinson as Mr. Shelton

== Production ==
The film was produced by Deborah Del Prete, who produced Lexi Alexander's first full-length feature film, Green Street Hooligans. It was executive produced by Tommy Alastra. Alan and Hugh Hunter were co-producers, and also produced Alexander's Oscar-nominated short, Johnny Flynton.

The film was shot entirely in Irondale, Morris/pinson and Birmingham, Alabama, in the United States.

The film was endorsed by HRock Church of Pasadena, California. The church's senior pastor, Ché Ahn, and his son, Gabe Ahn, were shown a special screening of the film. Gabe was quoted as saying, "What I liked so much about this film is that it centered on family relationships, but at the same time encourages us to dream big."

Lifted was the first film made under Alabama's new film incentive program.

== Reception ==
Reviewer Ted Grande Falcone on his website reviewed the film positively, saying that, "Lifted reminds us of the importance of unconditional love in the family unit and of pursuing dreams. Also, the film serves as a heartfelt tribute to the tremendous sacrifices all our servicemen and women and their families make every day. From a political standpoint, it successfully navigates the narrow road of depicting war as tragedy but warriors as vital heroes." The director dedicated the film "to all of our fallen heroes".

The film was actively promoted by GATE (Global Alliance for Transformational Entertainment), an organization co-founded by Jim Carrey and Eckhart Tolle.
