= Gigi Pritzker =

American billionaire and film producer (born 1962)

- Born: Jean Pritzker; 27 July 1962 (age 64); Chicago, Illinois, U.S.
- Education: Stanford University (BA)
- Occupation: Film producer
- Known for: Co-founder of OddLot Entertainment
- Spouse: Michael Pucker
- Children: 3
- Parent(s): Jay Pritzker (father); Cindy Friend (mother)
- Family: Thomas Pritzker (brother); John Pritzker (brother); Daniel Pritzker (brother); See Pritzker family

Gigi Pritzker (born 27 July 1962) is an American billionaire and film producer who is a member of the Pritzker family.

Pritzker is co-founder of the film production and financing company Odd Lot Entertainment, producing several films including Rabbit Hole, Drive, and Hell or High Water. Pritzker has also produced for TV, including The Dragon Prince, which won the 2020 Emmy for Outstanding Children's Animated Series.

== Early life and education ==
Jean Pritzker was born to the wealthy Pritzker family in Chicago, Illinois, the daughter of Marian "Cindy" (née Friend) and Jay Pritzker. Her maternal grandfather was Prague-born jurist Hugo Friend. Her father, along with his brothers, Robert and Donald Pritzker, diversified the Chicago-based family business, the Marmon Group. They created the Hyatt Hotel chain in 1957 and owned Braniff Airlines from 1983 until 1988, later divesting many assets.

Pritzker graduated from The Latin School of Chicago in Winnetka, Illinois, in 1980 and went on to receive a Bachelor of Arts (B.A.) in anthropology from Stanford University.

== Career ==
After taking courses in documentary filmmaking, Pritzker, along with Deborah Del Prete, co-founded the Culver City, California-based film production and financing company Odd Lot Entertainment. In 2010, Odd Lot produced the film Rabbit Hole, starring Nicole Kidman, and in 2011, the film Drive, starring Ryan Gosling. In November 2013, Odd Lot released Ender's Game a film, co-starring Harrison Ford and based on Orson Scott Card's science fiction novel.

Pritzker, along with her with partner Ted Rawlins, co-lead the company Relevant Theatricals, which develops and produces live stage productions, including the play Million Dollar Quartet.

== Personal life ==
Pritzker is married to Michael Pucker and has three children.

== Filmography ==
Pritzker was a producer in all films unless otherwise noted.

=== Film ===
| Year | Film | Credit | Notes |
|---|---|---|---|
| 1989 | The Phantom of the Opera | Line producer | |
| 1989 | Simple Justice | Executive producer | |
| 1997 | Hostile Intent | Executive producer | |
| 1998 | Ricochet River | | |
| 2001 | The Wedding Planner | | |
| 2004 | Mean Creek | Executive producer | |
| 2005 | Green Street | | |
| 2007 | Undead or Alive | | |
| 2007 | Suburban Girl | | |
| 2007 | Buried Alive | | |
| 2008 | The Spirit | | |
| 2009 | Green Street 2: Stand Your Ground | | Direct-to-video |
| 2009 | The Open Road | Executive producer | |
| 2010 | Rabbit Hole | | |
| 2011 | From Prada to Nada | | |
| 2011 | Drive | | |
| 2013 | The Way, Way Back | Executive producer | |
| 2013 | Ender's Game | | |
| 2014 | Draft Day | | |
| 2014 | Rosewater | | |
| 2015 | Mortdecai | | |
| 2016 | Hell or High Water | Executive producer | |
| 2017 | Landline | | |
| 2019 | Motherless Brooklyn | | |
| 2019 | 21 Bridges | | |
| 2020 | My Spy | | |
| 2021 | The Eyes of Tammy Faye | | |
| 2025 | Prime Minister | | |
| 2025 | Nonnas | | |
| 2026 | Miss You, Love You | | |

Thanks

| Year | Film | Role |
|---|---|---|
| 2015 | Everlasting | Special thanks |

=== Television ===
| Year | Title | Credit | Notes |
|---|---|---|---|
| 2008 | Living Hell | | Television film |
| 2017 | Sun Records | Co-executive producer | |
| 2018 | The Dragon Prince | Executive producer | |
| 2017−21 | Genius | Executive producer | |
