= Deborah Del Prete =

American film producer

Deborah Del Prete is an American producer. Her son, actor and musician Terence Jay has appeared in/composed a number of films that she has produced. She is the cofounder of OddLot Entertainment along with Gigi Pritzker.

== Producer filmography ==
Year	Film	Director
2001	The Wedding Planner	Adam Shankman
2005	Green Street	Lexi Alexander
2007	Buried Alive	Robert Kurtzman
2007	Suburban Girl	Marc Klein
2007	Undead or Alive	Glasgow Phillips
2008	The Spirit	Frank Miller
2008	Living Hell	Richard Jefferies
2009	Green Street 2: Stand Your Ground	Jesse V. Johnson
2011	Lifted	Lexi Alexander

== See also ==
- Terence Jay
