= OddLot Entertainment =

Defunct American film production company

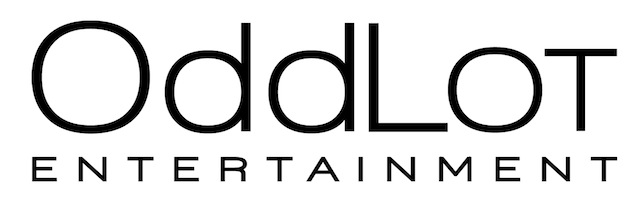
- OddLot's logo
- Type: Private
- Industry: Entertainment
- Founded: 2001; 25 years ago
- Founders: Gigi Pritzker; Deborah Del Prete
- Defunct: 2015; 11 years ago
- Fate: Folded Into Madison Wells Media
- Successor: Madison Wells Media
- Headquarters: Culver City, California, United States
- Divisions: DarkLot Entertainment
- Website: OddLotEntertainment.com

OddLot Entertainment was an American independent film studio, founded by Gigi Pritzker and Deborah Del Prete in 2001, which dealt with financing and production of films.

== History ==
=== OddLot Entertainment ===
In 2013, OddLot produced a cinematic version of Ender's Game. The cinematic version of the film was in development, in one form or another, for over a decade until its premiere. In the same year, OddLot signed a multi-year distribution and co-financing agreement with Lionsgate. OddLot and Lionsgate have previously collaborated on the production of Draft Day and Ender's Game. The collaboration officially began with the production of Mortdecai, an action comedy that was released in 2015.

=== DarkLot Entertainment ===
OddLot has launched horror production division DarkLot Entertainment, has produced films such as Undead or Alive: The Zombedy, Buried Alive, Living Hell and The Spirit.

== List of produced films ==
=== as OddLot Entertainment ===
Release date	Title	Co-production with	Distribution
September 9, 2005	Green Street	N/A	Universal Pictures (United Kingdom); Freestyle Releasing (United States)
March 15, 2007	Undead or Alive: A Zombedy	N/A	Image Entertainment
April 27, 2007	Suburban Girl	N/A	Image Entertainment
December 25, 2008	The Spirit	DarkLot Entertainment	Lionsgate
March 23, 2009	Green Street 2: Stand Your Ground	N/A	Lionsgate Home Entertainment
September 13, 2010	Rabbit Hole	Blossom Films	Lionsgate
January 28, 2011	From Prada to Nada	Gilbert Films; Lionsgate; Televisa; Hyperion Films	Pantelion Films
September 16, 2011	Drive	Bold Films; Marc Platt Productions; Motel Movies	FilmDistrict
January 21, 2013	The Way, Way Back	Sycamore Pictures	Fox Searchlight Pictures
October 24, 2013	Ender's Game	Chartoff Productions; Taleswapper; K/O Paper Products; Digital Domain; Sierra/Affinity	Summit Entertainment (through Lionsgate)
April 7, 2014	Draft Day	The Montecito Picture Company	Summit Entertainment; Lionsgate
August 29, 2014	Rosewater	Busboy Productions	Open Road Films
January 23, 2015	Mortdecai	Lionsgate; Infinitum Nihil; Mad Chance Productions	Lionsgate
May 16, 2016	Hell or High Water	Sidney Kimmel Entertainment; Film 44; LBI Entertainment	Lionsgate and CBS Films

=== as DarkLot Entertainment ===
Release date	Title	Production partners	Distributors
March 15, 2007	Undead or Alive: The Zombedy	N/A	Image Entertainment
October 23, 2007	Buried Alive	N/A	Dimension Extreme
June 10, 2008	Living Hell	N/A	N/A
December 25, 2008	The Spirit	OddLot Entertainment	Lionsgate
