= Tie a Yellow Ribbon (film) =

- Official poster
- Directed by: Joy Dietrich
- Screenplay by: Joy Dietrich
- Produced by: Joy Dietrich; Thomas Yong
- Starring: Kim Jiang; Jane Kim; Patrick Heusinger; Ian Wen; Theresa Ngo; Gregory Waller
- Cinematography: Lars Bonde
- Edited by: Rasmus Høgdall Mølgaard; Stephen Maing
- Production companies: Tie a Yellow Ribbon, LLC; ITVS; Shouting Cow Productions; Gigantic Pictures
- Release date: March 18, 2007 (CAAMFest)
- Running time: 90 minutes
- Country: United States
- Language: English

Tie a Yellow Ribbon is a 2007 drama film directed and written by Korean-American filmmaker Joy Dietrich. The film portrays the complex emotions for young adult East Asian American women through its main character, Jenny, a Korean adoptee in America struggling thorough life and difficult relationships. It was filmed and takes place in New York City.

Tie a Yellow Ribbon premiered on March 18, 2006 at the San Francisco International Asian American Film Festival. It was later aired on PBS television in the ITVS series on May 1, 2008.

== Plot ==
Jenny is a young Korean-American woman and aspiring photographer who was adopted by a white family as a child. As an adult, she lives in Manhattan and is estranged from her Midwestern family because of a childhood incident with her brother, Joe. She spends most of her days in the presence of white friends and colleagues, in addition to casual flings with white men that never develop into actual relationships.

When Jenny is kicked out of the apartment she shares with her roommate, she moves in with Beatrice Shimizu, a beautiful but insecure model and college student. She also meets graphic artist Simon Chang, who lives next door with his sister Sandy, a socially awkward nursing student. Initially, Jenny has difficulty bonding with Bea and Simon because she is not as connected to her Asian-American identity as they are. Jenny learns to help Bea, who struggles with her own self-esteem issues and has to deal with her philandering boyfriend, Phillip. Jenny also tries to help Sandy overcome her shyness, and opens herself to the possibility of a relationship with Simon. In return, Simon and Bea encourage Jenny's interest in photography. When Joe shows up out of the blue, Jenny must confront her unresolved feelings about her upbringing and her Asian-American identity.

== Cast ==
- Kim Jiang as Jenny Mason
  - Haemi Hong as teenage Jenny
- Jane Kim as Beatrice Shimizu
- Patrick Heusinger as Joe Mason
  - Zach Roerig as teenage Joe
- Ian Wen as Simon Chang
- Theresa Ngo as Sandy Chang
- Gregory Waller as Phillip
- Vincent Piazza as Ed

== Production ==
Writer and director Joy Dietrich, herself a Korean adoptee, said, "I wanted to make a film that gave nuanced portraits of young Asian-American women whose stories are seldom told in mainstream media. The dirty little secret is that Asian-American women have one of the highest rates of depression in the United States. While this film doesn't attempt to explain the reasons why, it does expose the isolating, alienating factors that make the young women feel the way they do -- the greatest among them the lack of acceptance and belonging. [The film] is ultimately about three young women's search for love and belonging."

In October 2005, ITVS optioned Dietrich's screenplay. Principal photography took place intermittently from early 2005 to June 2006.

== Film festivals ==
Tie a Yellow Ribbon was screened at a variety of film festivals, including the 2007 CineVegas International Film Festival, the 2007 San Diego Asian Film Festival, the 2007 DC Asian Pacific American Film Festival, 2007 San Francisco International Asian American Film Festival, the 30th Asian American International Film Festival, the 2007 VC Film Festival, the 2007 Urbanworld Film Festival, the 2008 Silk Screen Asian American Film Festival, and the 2008 Wisconsin Film Festival.

International film festival screenings included the 2007 International Emerging Talent Film Festival in Monaco, as well as the Women Make Waves Film Festival in Taiwan, the International Women's Film Festival in South Korea, and the Créteil International Women's Film Festival in France.

== Critical reception ==
Benjamin Spacek of Las Vegas Weekly gave a positive review, awarding it 4/4 stars. He wrote, "It's a sullen and moody work...it's also elegant and touching." Spacek continued, "Using gorgeous location photography in tandem with an evocative soundtrack, Dietrich gives the film a lyrical quality, as we drift in and out of Jenny's dreams. The deeper we dig, though, the more we find her fears and desires are universal. It's a personal and unique vision, but it is no longer alone." Reviewing the film for Variety, critic Dennis Harvey called the film "thoughtful" and said although its themes feel underdeveloped, its "virtues outweigh its flaws." Harvey added, "Character writing and situations could have been taken to the next level in terms of emotional impact, though what's here is still reasonably engrossing and poignant. If pic doesn't ultimately match its own thematic ambition and dramatic potential, it still makes a fresh, credible impression."

Writing for the Asia Pacific Arts magazine, Ada Tseng commented, "Dietrich has constructed a film that is not afraid to leave things murky and barely hopeful; the past keeps haunting, mistakes keep being made, and things that seem simple that may promote growth and healing may or may not work out." Tseng added, "Jiang carries the film with a compelling performance throughout while dealing with taboo subjects; Kim is nervously fragile and heartbreaking as the perfect-on-the-outside girl who might fall apart at any second; and the third female character, Sandy, provides some comic relief as a shy little sister who is learning how to speak up for herself and demand respect."

== Awards ==
- CineVegas International Film Festival 2007 — Special Jury Prize, Joy Dietrich, Best Director
- Urbanworld Film Festival 2007 — Grand Jury Prize, Best Narrative Feature, Joy Dietrich
- San Francisco Women's Film Festival 2008 — Best Feature Indy
- Delray Beach Film Festival, May 2008 — Director's Choice for Best Feature
