= The Bad Place =

1990 novel by Dean Koontz

- Cover for The Bad Place
- Author: Dean Koontz
- Cover artist: Don Brautigam
- Language: English
- Genre: Horror
- Publisher: G. P. Putnam's Sons
- Publication date: 1990
- Publication place: United States
- Media type: Print
- Pages: 382
- ISBN: 0-399-13498-0
- OCLC: 22778155

The Bad Place is a horror novel by American writer Dean Koontz, released in 1990. It includes elements of horror, suspense, and mystery, and is presented partially as a twist on the private eye drama.

== Synopsis ==
Frank Pollard wakes up in an alley at night, filled with confusion and fear. He knows nothing but his name, and that he must escape fast, or else he will be killed. Pursued by a mysterious assailant, Frank barely escapes with his life.

Every time he goes to sleep, he wakes up to find evidence of bizarre nighttime travels which he cannot remember. Afraid of his own actions, Frank enlists the help of husband-wife security team, Bobby and Julie Dakota. At first, the case merely seems absurd, but as they track deeper into the life and past of the mysterious Frank Pollard, the Dakotas uncover an increasingly bizarre and dangerous world threatened by a madman who thirsts for blood.

It is ultimately revealed that Frank Pollard is the brother to the mysterious madman as well as twin sisters. They were born from a mother who was the product of an incestuous relationship. Her father was a hallucinogenic drug-abuser and her mother was his sister. She is a hermaphrodite and impregnated herself with her own seed. As a result of this compounded inbreeding, Frank and his siblings developed unusual psychic abilities. Frank, wanting a normal life, tries to escape from his family while being pursued by his brother who seeks to either bring him back or kill him, and nothing will stand in his way. After a message from Julie's younger brother, who has Down Syndrome and possesses minor psychic ability himself, Bobby, Julie, Frank and his family begin speeding into a final confrontation.

== Powers ==
Frank Pollard

Suffering from amnesia for the majority of the novel, Frank's powers are not under his control until he regains his memory towards the end of the story. His sole power is the ability to "Travel" - instantly teleport himself to seemingly anywhere in the universe. Most of his Travelling is on Earth however there are occasions it's evidenced he can Travel to far off worlds, although his past experience on these worlds is never explained in the narrative. When Frank is about to teleport, a strange flute-like noise is heard. In addition, anything he is touching will teleport with him, as was with the hospital bed guard rail that was ripped from the bed when he traveled.

There are subtle indications he's also telepathic but like his powers of teleportation these are untrained and of no practical use.

Candy Pollard

Frank's brother is the most powerful of all the offspring. He possesses the same ability as Frank to Travel albeit with considerably more skill and control.

Candy also has psychometric skills, and is able to touch objects and people to learn about their previous actions and current whereabouts, which he uses to pursue Frank.

His final ability is the Blue Light which is some form of telekinetic energy discharge signified by a blue aura when he's channelling it. Able to destroy objects and buildings but unable to affect living tissue, he uses this power to both destroy a car Frank is fleeing in and level the nursing home that Julie's psychic brother is living in.

There are indications that he also has latent telepathic abilities but these are undeveloped, and he only uses them on a limited basis.

Violet and Verbina Pollard

Frank and Candy's identical twin sisters form a sort of hive mind, each of the pair knowing what the other is thinking, seeing, and sharing their physical sensations. They share this mind-link with the dozens of cats that occupy their home, and are able to extend their senses to any other animals they reach out to. Only humans are immune to the sisters' mental influence, which leads to their inability to identify with anyone other than themselves and their pets. Of the pair, only Violet is able to speak; Verbina is shy and withdrawn to the point of Autism, communicating only through her mental bond with Violet.

While not strictly violent or necessarily vicious, the Pollard twins possess the moral ambivalence of wild animals. They crave wild and evocative sensation, and will often share the minds of both predator and prey animals simultaneously, feeling the thrill of the hunt and the pain of death at the same moment. When one of their pets dies, Violet, Verbina, and the remaining cats feed on the corpse, so that they'll all remain together forever.

== Movie adaptation ==
According to Koontz in the afterword of a 2004 paperback reissue, rights for a movie version of The Bad Place were purchased by Warner Bros. in 1990. Actor Don Johnson and his wife Melanie Griffith were looking to play the leads of Bobby and Julie Dakota. Koontz wrote the screenplay and it drew considerable buzz at the studio until the then studio chief deemed it "confusing." The studio refused to sell the script back to Koontz.

Director Chuck Russell was signed to direct the film in 1991 with Richard Jefferies writing the screenplay. The film would have been produced by Lee Rich Productions. However, Jefferies left the project after writing 3 drafts, citing that he was "burned out". After his departure, Andrew Wolk was brought on as a writer. This version also never came into fruition.
