= The Girls' Guide to Hunting and Fishing =

1999 collection of short stories by Melissa Bank

- First edition
- Author: Melissa Bank
- Language: English
- Genre: short fiction, linked short story collection, coming of age
- Publisher: Viking Press
- Publication date: 1999
- Publication place: United States
- Media type: Print (Paperback)
- Pages: 288 pp
- ISBN: 0-670-88300-X
- OCLC: 40159073
- Dewey Decimal: 813/.54 21
- LC Class: PS3552.A487 G57 1999

The Girls' Guide to Hunting and Fishing is a 1999 collection of linked short stories by Melissa Bank. The stories follow the main character Jane Rosenal, starting with her life at age 14.

The Girls' Guide to Hunting And Fishing spent 16 weeks on The New York Times Best Seller list. It was a bestseller in both the United States and the United Kingdom. The Los Angeles Times wrote, "Bank writes like John Cheever, but funnier." Newsweek critic Yahlin Chang wrote, "Bank draws exquisite portraits of loneliness, and she can do it in a sentence." Others placed Bank in the school of restraint exemplified by Hemingway and Raymond Carver.

== Stories ==
- "Advanced Beginners"
- "The Floating House"
- "My Old Man"
- "The Best Possible Light"
- "The Worst Thing a Suburban Girl Could Imagine"
- "You Could Be Anyone"
- "The Girls' Guide to Hunting and Fishing"

== Adaptations ==
Two films are based on part or all of this work:

- The Girls' Guide to Hunting and Fishing — Francis Ford Coppola (who has the rights to the title and short story of that name) and American Zoetrope are developing a film which is adapted from the book's last short story.
- Suburban Girl (2008)
