= Car Dogs =

- Directed by: Adam Collis
- Written by: Mark Edward King
- Produced by: Adam Collis; Stefanie Epstein; Mark Edward King; Adam Robinson; F. Miguel Valenti
- Starring: Patrick J. Adams; Alessandra Torresani; Octavia Spencer; Dash Mihok; Stefanie Butler; Josh Hopkins; Nia Vardalos; Cory Hardrict; Chris Mulkey; George Lopez
- Cinematography: David Stump
- Edited by: Nicholas Ramirez
- Music by: Galactic
- Production company: Scotty Gelt Productions
- Release date: April 17, 2016 (Sarasota Film Festival)
- Running time: 104 minutes
- Country: United States
- Language: English

Car Dogs is a 2016 drama film which stars George Lopez, Dash Mihok, Patrick J. Adams, Octavia Spencer, and Josh Hopkins. The film is set in a car dealership where, in a single day, salesmen have to sell more cars than they ever have done.

== Plot ==
Malcolm Chamberlain runs the Chamberlain Auto Group, and his son Mark works for him as a general manager. Malcolm is a ruthless and manipulative car dealer. He offers his son a major part of a new store if he and the team of car salesmen can sell 35 cars in a day, and they have to do it by 5pm. Sales manager Mike Reynolds has his eyes on the new dealership for himself and is playing dirty tricks behind Mark's back to win the job.

== Cast ==
- Patrick J. Adams as Mark Chamberlain
- Alessandra Torresani as Sheri
- Octavia Spencer as Mrs. Barrett
- Nia Vardalos as Sharon
- Dash Mihok as Scott
- Chris Mulkey as Malcolm Chamberlain
- Josh Hopkins as Mike Reynolds
- George Lopez as Christian

== Production ==
Car Dogs was directed by Adam Collis, a film professor at Arizona State University (ASU), and developed through a partnership between private equity investors and ASU. Collis arranged for 85 ASU film students and 15 recent graduates to participate as interns on the production, working alongside a professional crew to gain practical filmmaking experience.

The screenplay was written by Mark Edward King, a former ASU student, who originally conceived the story as a short film about a group of salesmen attempting to break a one-day sales record. Collis encouraged King to expand the concept into a feature-length script, noting that the single-location setting would suit a low-budget production. He also emphasised that car buying was a broadly relatable theme in American culture.

Casting director John Jackson, known for his collaborations with Alexander Payne, helped assemble the film’s cast. One major revision involved reimagining a role initially written for a young “Ben Affleck–type” into one for an older Mexican-American salesman, leading to the casting of George Lopez.

Filming took place on an abandoned car lot in Scottsdale, Arizona, under the Screen Actors Guild Low Budget Agreement. Collis declined to reveal the budget but described it as modest while not a micro-budget project.

== Reception ==
Bill Goodykoontz of the Arizona Republic awarded the film 3 out of 5 stars, noting that while the story is familiar, the cast makes it "a lot more pleasant to spend time on this lot than a real one." He highlighted Josh Hopkins’ performance as particularly effective, calling him "excellent at making Reynolds devious, while still showing his skills as a salesman".

Mike Massie of Gone With the Twins rating it 2 out of 10, and described the dialogue as "entirely ordinary" and the story as "dreadfully average," arguing that the authenticity drawn from the writer’s car sales experience did not translate into entertainment.
