= Suburban Girl =

2007 film directed by Marc Klein

- DVD cover
- Directed by: Marc Klein
- Screenplay by: Marc Klein
- Based on: "My Old Man" and "The Worst Thing a Suburban Girl Could Imagine" by Melissa Bank
- Produced by: Deborah Del Prete; Gigi Pritzker; Daryl Taja
- Starring: Sarah Michelle Gellar; Alec Baldwin; Maggie Grace; James Naughton; Chris Carmack
- Cinematography: Steven Fierberg
- Edited by: Joan Sobel
- Music by: Heitor Pereira
- Production company: OddLot Entertainment
- Distributed by: Image Entertainment
- Release dates: April 27, 2007 (Tribeca); January 15, 2008 (United States)
- Running time: 97 minutes
- Country: United States
- Language: English
- Box office: $113,324 (foreign)

Suburban Girl is a 2007 American romantic comedy film directed by Marc Klein and produced by Gigi Pritzker and Deborah Del Prete. It stars Sarah Michelle Gellar and Alec Baldwin, with Maggie Grace, James Naughton, and Chris Carmack in supporting roles. It is adapted from the short stories "My Old Man" and "The Worst Thing a Suburban Girl Could Imagine" from Melissa Bank's 1999 best-selling book The Girls' Guide to Hunting and Fishing.

The film had its premiere at New York's Tribeca Film Festival on April 27, 2007. It was released on DVD and Blu-ray in the United States on January 15, 2008.

== Plot ==
Brett Eisenberg is an ambitious yet unconfident New York City assistant book editor living in the literary hotbed of Manhattan's Upper East Side. Struggling to become a full-fledged editor, she is shocked when she learns that her mentor and boss is fired and replaced by the glamorous Faye Falkner. At a book signing, Brett meets the notorious and much older publishing playboy Archie Knox. After spending time with him, she realizes how unhappy she is with her immature boyfriend Jed and breaks off their relationship in order to pursue one with Archie.

Archie is a recovering alcoholic, suffers from diabetes, and has an estranged daughter. The age gap between Brett and him is made clear through their different lifestyles, such as his lack of understanding of how to use a Blackberry and Brett taking him to a candy shop. Although this does not affect their relationship in the beginning — Brett appreciates the advice and confidence he gives her to stand up to Faye — she soon begins to resent his patronizing attitude. Brett and Archie fight about him treating her like his daughter and not telling her that he used to date Faye. He eventually begins drinking again and sleeps with another woman in order to break off their relationship.

Brett explains her situation to her father, Robert, and asks for his advice. While visiting her family home, she is shocked to discover that Robert has cancer; her family hid this from her, but told her brother Ethan, because they felt she would not be able to handle the news. Depressed and despondent, Brett makes a poor impression on a celebrity client until Archie appears and rescues the situation. They decide to give their relationship another try and Brett introduces him to her family, who are uncomfortable with the age difference. Robert especially becomes apprehensive after learning of Archie's alcoholism when he is admitted to hospital, and advises Brett that she should not have to spend her life taking care of Archie.

After Robert dies, Brett realizes she must finally deal with her problems without his support. Archie proposes using the Blackberry that Brett bought him but she turns him down, telling him that they see each other as teacher and student and not as equals. She says she needs time to be happy and grow up on her own.

Brett, finally confident in herself, wears a pair of leather pants she was previously too scared to wear. She begins to edit her work in a decisive way by using a pen instead of a pencil, as she used to do throughout the film.

== Cast ==
- Sarah Michelle Gellar as Brett Eisenberg
- Alec Baldwin as Archie Knox
- Maggie Grace as Chloe
- James Naughton as Robert Eisenberg
- Vanessa Branch as Faye Faulkner
- Peter Scolari as Mickey Lamm
- Marian Seldes as Margaret Paddleford
- Ebon Moss-Bachrach as Ethan Eisenberg
- Chris Carmack as Jed Hanson
- Jill Eikenberry as Marlene Eisenberg
- Marin Ireland as Katie
- Nate Corddry as Jason
- Amad Jackson as Seaver

== Production ==
The film was produced by Odd Lot Entertainment in association with Catch 23 Productions. Deborah Del Prete, Gigi Pritzker and Daryl Taja served as producers. It was the directorial debut of Marc Klein, who had written the screenplay for Serendipity (2001). By November 2005, both Gellar and Baldwin had been cast in the leading roles. It was filmed in various locations around New York City as well as Toronto, Canada, starting in May 2006.

During pre-production and filming, the filmmakers behind Suburban Girl used the title of the book, The Girls' Guide to Hunting and Fishing, for the project. However, director Francis Ford Coppola had the rights to the title and short story of that name, while his company American Zoetrope was to develop a film which was adapted from the book. The film's title was officially changed to Suburban Girl for its release.

== Reception ==
The film received generally mixed reviews from critics. On Rotten Tomatoes, the film has a rating of 50%, based on 8 reviews, with an average rating of 6.1/10.

Variety described it as "a blend of Sex and the City and The Devil Wears Prada", and a "pseudo-sophisticated romantic comedy". Gellar's onscreen chemistry with Baldwin was praised, with Eye for Film commenting, "The film works best when Baldwin and Gellar are together — aside from the fact that Gellar seriously needs to eat a bun or two." Film website moviepicturefilm.com stated, "Gellar and Baldwin both give wonderful performances and make their chemistry incredibly real and ultimately, quite heartbreaking. Containing a ton of laughs and killer fashion that could give The Devil Wears Prada a run for its money, this movie has something uncommon in most romantic comedies, tons of style and a huge heart."

== Soundtrack ==
No official soundtrack was released but tracks within the film include:

- "Love Song" — written and performed by Sara Bareilles
- "Smokin' Some Blues" — written and performed by Terance Jay
- "Silent Night" — written by Josef Mohr, performed by Terrance Jay
- "Start Being Nicer" — written by Ken Steen, performed by Torpedo Boys
- "Charm Attack" — written and performed by Leona Naess
- "Come to the Party" — written and performed by Sam Winch
- "Space Age Love Song" — written by Francis Maudsle et al., performed by Abra Moore
- "Having a Party" — written by Malissa Hunter and Billy J Stein, performed by Malissa Hunter
- "Funny Kind of Love" — written by Christopher Alan Livingston and Frank D Piazza, performed by Audio Paint
- "Your Love Beside Me" — written by Ray Greene et al., performed by Ray Greene
- "More Luck" — written by Ray Greene et al., performed by Ray Greene
- "Cause a Rockslide" — written by Damon Gough, performed by Badly Drawn Boy
- "Tokyo Boys" — written by Mladen Borosak and Tammy Plynn, performed by Running Red Lights
- "Concert Source" — written and performed by Drew Perrante
- "Speeding Cars" — written and performed by Imogen Heap
- "She Painted Pictures" — written by Liam Pickering, performed by Liam Frost
- "Slipping Under(Sing Along to Your Favorite Song)" — written and performed by William Tell
- "Cold Hearts" — written by Johan Andergard, performed by Club 8
- "No Fear" — written and performed by Melissa Tallon
