= Ross McCall =

Scottish actor (born 1976)

- Born: 13 January 1976 (age 50); Port Glasgow, Scotland
- Occupation: Actor
- Years active: 1989–present
- Partner(s): Jennifer Love Hewitt (ex-fiancée, 2005-2008)

Ross McCall (born 13 January 1976) is a Scottish actor best known for his roles as T-5 Joseph Liebgott in the miniseries Band of Brothers (2001) and Matthew Keller in the series White Collar (2010–2014). In 1989, he played the child version of Freddie Mercury in the music video for the Queen single "The Miracle".

== Early life ==
McCall was born in Port Glasgow to John and Maggie McCall but was raised in England from the age of seven, when his family relocated to Kent. His older brother, Stuart, is a policeman in Sussex. His father was in the Kent Fire Brigade and was a station officer, the highest rank. His mother was a nurse. His parents later amicably divorced. Both live in England.

== Career ==
McCall's first notable screen role was at the age of 13 when he appeared as Freddie Mercury in the 1989 music video for the Queen song "The Miracle". In 1993, he was featured in BBC children's television series The Return of the Borrowers.

In 2001, McCall acted in the HBO miniseries Band of Brothers. Years later, in 2005, he co-starred in the independent drama film Green Street (2005) and later reprised his role as Dave in the 2009 straight-to-video sequel Green Street 2: Stand Your Ground. He then played Kenny Battaglia in the television series Crash.

In 2008, McCall co-starred in an After Dark Horrorfest film, Autopsy. In 2010, he appeared as a guest star on White Collar in the episode "Bottlenecked" as Matthew Keller, an old rival of lead character Neal. He reprised the role in episode 14 of season 2, episodes 9–11 of season 3 and episodes 2–6 of season 6. Also in 2010, he appeared as a guest star on Luther. Serving Up Richard, shot at the Sunset Gower studios in LA, was released in 2011. He also had a recurring role as Ron Clark on 24: Live Another Day.

In June 2016, McCall released a short documentary detailing his trip to the Faroe Islands, and his support of Sea Shepherd's campaign, 'Operation Sleppið Grindini'. In the documentary, he interviewed several locals about their views on the controversial traditional pilot whale drive hunt known as the 'Grindadrap'. He also interviews several Sea Shepherd volunteers stationed in the Islands monitoring the activities of the hunters.

== Personal life ==
McCall and his brother were raised in the Roman Catholic faith. McCall was engaged to American actress Jennifer Love Hewitt, with whom he guest starred in an episode of Ghost Whisperer. On 5 January 2009, People magazine reported that Hewitt called off their engagement in late 2008.

After years of speculation, McCall and Italian actress Alessandra Mastronardi made their red-carpet debut at the Venice Film Festival in 2019. They became engaged in 2021, but have since broken up. They were together for four years.

== Filmography ==
=== Film ===
Year	Title	Role	Notes
1992	Waterland	Terry	
2003	LD 50 Lethal Dose	Gary	
2004	EMR	Derek	
2005	Green Street	Dave Bjorno	
2007	Trade Routes	Tim Knight	
2007	Saint Anthony	Anthony of Padua	
2008	Autopsy	Jude	
2009	Green Street 2: Stand Your Ground	Dave Bjorno	Direct-to-video
2009	Knuckle Draggers	Ethan	
2011	Serving Up Richard	Richard Rubens	a.k.a. The Guest Room
2013	Automotive	Nondescript	
2013	It's Not You, It's Me	Dave	
2016	In Embryo	Sean White	
2016	A Christmas in New York	Ben Haney	
2017	The Beautiful Ones	Gabriel Tancredi	
2018	Hex	Isaac	
2019	7 Days to Vegas	Sebastian	
2020	The Good Traitor	Mason Sears	
2020	About Us	Ryan Newman	
2021	A Violent Man	Luke Mackelson	
2021	Aftermath	Nick Scott	
2025	Mission: Impossible – The Final Reckoning	Agent Boulding	

=== Television ===
Year	Title	Role	Notes
1990	Jekyll & Hyde	Copy Boy	Television film
1991	The Brittas Empire	Boy Scout	Episode: "Opening Day"
1992	The Borrowers		Uncredited
1993	Bonjour la Classe	St. Bernard's Captain	Episode: "Red Card"
1993	The Return of the Borrowers	Ilrick	4 episodes
1993, 1995, 1998	The Bill	Various roles	3 episodes
1995	It Could Be You	Youth	Television film
1996	Bramwell	Man in Cap	Episode #2.6
1996	In Suspicious Circumstances	Jules Meyer	2 episodes
1997	The Broker's Man	Ross	Episode: "Dangerous Bends: Part 1"
1997	Pie in the Sky	Dean Hazelwood	Episode: "Cutting the Mustard"
1998	My Summer with Des	Football Fan	Television film
2001	Band of Brothers	Joseph D. Liebgott	Main role
2005	Snakeman	Timothy	Television film
2005	Icon	WHO Official	Television film
2005	CSI: NY	Mike Adams	Episode: "Youngblood"
2005	Bones	Scott Costello	Episode: "The Girl in the Fridge"
2006	Ghost Whisperer	Todd Darger	Episode: "Friendly Neighborhood Ghost"
2007	The Man	Paul	Television film
2008–2009	Crash	Kenny Battaglia	Main role
2010	Luther	Daniel Sugarman	Episode #1.5
2010–2014	White Collar	Matthew Keller	9 episodes
2011	Castle	Detective Seth Carver	Episode: "Kick the Ballistics"
2012	Willed to Kill	Gavin McNabb	Television film
2013	A Country Christmas Story	Trev Hailey	Television film
2014	24: Live Another Day	Ron Clark	9 episodes
2016	Lucifer	Onyx	Episode: "#TeamLucifer"
2017	Fear the Walking Dead	Steven	Episode: "Eye of the Beholder"
2019	Rome in Love	Dominic D'Andrea	Television film
2022	Suspicion	Owen Neilssen	6 episodes
2022	The Offer	Special Agent Moran	Episode: "Warning Shots"
2024	Silo	Rebellion Leader	Episode: "The Engineer"
