= The Girl Who Invented Kissing =

2017 American romantic drama film

- Film poster
- Directed by: Tom Sierchio
- Screenplay by: Tom Sierchio
- Produced by: Corey Large; George Zakk
- Starring: Vincent Piazza; Dash Mihok; Suki Waterhouse; Luke Wilson; Abbie Cornish
- Cinematography: Joe DeSalvo
- Edited by: Gordon Grinberg
- Music by: Matthew Ryan
- Production companies: An Olive Branch Productions; 308 Enterprises
- Distributed by: Momentum Pictures
- Release date: April 29, 2017 (Beverly Hills)
- Running time: 106 minutes
- Country: United States
- Language: English

The Girl Who Invented Kissing is a 2017 American romantic drama film written and directed by Tom Sierchio and starring Vincent Piazza, Dash Mihok, Suki Waterhouse, Luke Wilson and Abbie Cornish. It is Sierchio's directorial debut.

== Cast ==
- Vincent Piazza as Jimmy
- Dash Mihok as Victor
- Suki Waterhouse as The Girl
- Abbie Cornish as Patti
- Luke Wilson as Leo
- Corey Large as Nolan
- Johnny Messner as Freddy
- Michael Buscemi as Phil
- Brooke Hoover as Irene
- David Hennessey as Brady

== Reception ==
It won four awards: best feature film, best director (Tom Sierchio), best actor (Dash Mihok) and best supporting actor (Vincent Piazza) at the Golden Door Film Festival in 2017.
