= Joy Dietrich =

Korean American filmmaker

Joy Dietrich is a Korean-born American journalist, writer, filmmaker, and producer. Her 2007 film Tie a Yellow Ribbon won several awards. Although born in Korea, she is an American adoptee, who grew up in the United States.

== Background ==
She was the only Asian-American living in her American community and her family was dysfunctional. She experienced racism and finally left her hometown, not intending to return. As she described her background in a 2007 interview,

"So when I was young, obviously the racism was really depressing me. You know, racism in my community was—at one point I couldn’t bear it, I was always hanging my head or something. I was the only Asian in town. I think just getting out of that community helped me, to see that there was something else, an alternative life. I also come from a very dysfunctional family, so the combination of my dysfunctional family and my community being the way it was, it was very stifling and depressing. So I got out of it. I left my hometown. I haven’t gone back since. …"

She left home to study at university, earning two master's degrees: one in International Relations and another in Labor Economics.

== Film career ==
Dietrich began her professional career in publishing as an editor and reporter for magazines and news services in the United States and overseas, but in the late 1990s, she relocated to New York City and learned filmmaking.

In 2001, her autobiographical first film, Surplus, was a 16 mm short on the devastating effects of poverty on Korean family children.

In 2004, she was given a grant from the New York State Council on the Arts, and in 2006, got a residency from the Lower Manhattan Cultural Council. Later on, she was funded by the Independent Television Service’s Open Call for her first feature-length film, Tie a Yellow Ribbon, which won the Best Director Prize at the 2007 CineVegas Film Festival in Las Vegas and the Grand Prize for Best Feature at the Urbanworld Vibe Film Festival in New York.

== Personal life ==
Joy Dietrich works as a writer and research editor for The New York Times and on her filmmaking activities.
