= Serving Up Richard =

- Directed by: Henry Olek
- Written by: Henry Olek; Jay Longshore
- Produced by: Diane Levine
- Starring: Ross McCall; Susan Priver; Jude Ciccolella
- Cinematography: Bruce Alan Greene
- Music by: Stephen Graziano
- Production company: Dance On Productions
- Release date: 15 June 2011
- Running time: 106 minutes
- Country: United States
- Language: English

Serving Up Richard, also known as The Guest Room, is a 2011 American horror film directed by Henry Olek, starring Ross McCall, Susan Priver and Jude Ciccolella.

== Cast ==
- Ross McCall as Richard Rubens
- Susan Priver as Glory Hutchins
- Jude Ciccolella as Everett Hutchins
- Darby Stanchfield as Karen
- Michael Cambridge as Stanley
- Adam Kulbersh as Dennis

== Release ==
The film opened in Manhattan on 7 September 2012.

== Reception ==
Scott Hallam of Dread Central was rated the film 3.5 out of 5, calling it "entertaining, if not always completely believable". Neil Genzlinger of The New York Times rated the film 3 out of 5.

Chuck Bowen of Slant Magazine rated the film 1.5 stars out of 5 and wrote, "Serving Up Richard is ultimately a con itself, promising audiences disreputable vengeance only to deliver forgettable half-hearted pathos." The film received negative reviews in The Village Voice, Variety, and NPR.
