= Melissa Bank =

American author (1961–2022)

- Bank in 2006
- Born: Melissa Susan Bank; October 11, 1960; Boston, Massachusetts, U.S.
- Died: August 2, 2022 (aged 61); East Hampton, New York, U.S.
- Education: Hobart and William Smith Colleges (BA); Cornell University (MFA)
- Occupation: Novelist
- Partner: Todd Dimston
- Writing career
- Language: American English
- Notable work: The Girls' Guide to Hunting and Fishing
- Notable awards: Nelson Algren Award, 1993; Bestseller List, UK; Bestseller List, US

Melissa Susan Bank (October 11, 1960 – August 2, 2022) was an American author. She published two books—The Wonder Spot, a volume of short stories, and The Girls' Guide to Hunting and Fishing—and won the 1993 Nelson Algren Award for short fiction. She taught at Stony Brook University.

== Early life and education ==
Bank was born in Boston, on October 11, 1960. Her father, Arnold, was a neurologist who died during his late fifties of leukemia, a condition he concealed for almost ten years; her mother, Joan (Levine), worked as a teacher. Bank was raised in the Philadelphia suburb of Elkins Park, Pennsylvania.

In 1982, she graduated from Hobart and William Smith Colleges with a bachelor's degree in American studies. She then worked in publishing in New York City, and obtained a Master of Fine Arts in creative writing from Cornell University in 1987.

== Career ==
Bank published short stories and nonfiction in such publications as the Chicago Tribune, Ploughshares, Zoetrope, Cosmopolitan, Glamour, and Seventeen, as well as being broadcast on National Public Radio and the BBC. Her literary influences included Vladimir Nabokov, John Cheever, Billy Collins, and Grace Paley. She identified Janet Malcolm as her favorite non-fiction writer. Bank was conferred the Nelson Algren Literary Award in 1993 for her short story "Mr. Wilson and Dennis the Menace".

She also taught in the MFA program at Stony Brook Southampton.

=== The Girls' Guide to Hunting And Fishing ===
Bank began writing The Girls' Guide to Hunting And Fishing shortly after graduating from Cornell. It ultimately took her twelve years to complete. During most of that time, Bank worked as a copywriter, focusing on the novel in her spare time. She was involved in a serious bicycle accident where she was struck by a car in 1994, approximately five years before the book was published. She landed on her head, and even though she was wearing a helmet, she suffered post-concussion syndrome for almost two years. This condition affected her short-term memory and deprived her of the "top 10 to 15% of [her] vocabulary"; she was unable to order information or perform sequential thinking. Bank had to stop writing the book during this period.

Finally published in 1999, The Girls' Guide to Hunting And Fishing was a bestseller in both the United States and the United Kingdom, garnering mostly positive reviews. The novel has been translated into over 30 languages. The Los Angeles Times wrote, "Bank writes like John Cheever, but funnier." Newsweek critic Yahlin Chang wrote, "Bank draws exquisite portraits of loneliness, and she can do it in a sentence." Others placed Bank in the school of restraint exemplified by Hemingway and Raymond Carver. Stories from this popular book were later adapted into the 2007 romantic comedy film Suburban Girl.

=== Later works ===
Bank published her second novel, The Wonder Spot, in 2005. It took her five years to write the book, which did not fare as well as The Girls' Guide in terms of sales but was regarded by critics as the superior of the two works. She was writing a third book for Viking Press at the time of her death.

== Personal life ==
Bank was in a domestic partnership with Todd Dimston in the 18 years prior to her death. She did not have children. She divided her time between New York City and East Hampton. Bank was diagnosed with breast cancer in 1994, which she eventually recovered from. She also suffered from aphasia.

Bank died on August 2, 2022, at her home in East Hampton. She was 61, and suffered from lung cancer prior to her death.

== Publications ==
- The Wonder Spot (2005) OCLC 56840790 ISBN 0670034118
- Run run run run run run run away (short story) – 2005
- The Worst Thing a Suburban Girl Could Imagine (short story) – 1999 ISBN 9780141022796
- The Girls' Guide to Hunting and Fishing (1999) OCLC 40159073 ISBN 067088300X
