= Cold Creek Manor =

2003 horror film

- Theatrical release poster
- Directed by: Mike Figgis
- Written by: Richard Jefferies
- Produced by: Mike Figgis; Annie Stewart
- Starring: Dennis Quaid; Sharon Stone; Stephen Dorff; Juliette Lewis; Kristen Stewart; Christopher Plummer
- Cinematography: Declan Quinn
- Edited by: Dylan Tichenor
- Music by: Mike Figgis
- Production companies: Touchstone Pictures; Red Mullet
- Distributed by: Buena Vista Pictures Distribution
- Release date: September 19, 2003
- Running time: 119 minutes
- Country: United States
- Language: English
- Budget: $45 million
- Box office: $29.1 million

Cold Creek Manor is a 2003 American thriller film directed by Mike Figgis, and starring Dennis Quaid, Sharon Stone, Stephen Dorff, Juliette Lewis, Kristen Stewart, and Christopher Plummer. The screenplay by Richard Jefferies tells the story of a family terrorized by the former owner of the rural estate they bought in foreclosure. The film was released on September 19, 2003, and received negative reviews from critics.

== Plot ==
Cooper Tilson, his wife Leah, and their two children, Kristen and Jesse, leave New York after purchasing a country mansion. The previous owner, Dale Massie, convinces Cooper to hire him to help with repairs. Dale, recently released from prison, initially appears to be a good, kind worker. During renovations, Cooper discovers old documents and photographs and decides to record the history of the building on film. A series of unusual incidents unfold: Cooper is pursued by an unknown car, multiple venomous snakes are found on the property, and Kristen's horse is mysteriously killed. Cooper suspects Dale, particularly after seeing him strike his girlfriend Ruby in a crowded bar.

During his historical research of the manor, Cooper visits Dale's demented father in a nursing home. His disjointed comments convince Cooper that Dale murdered his wife and children. Dale claims his wife fled with the children when he was imprisoned years earlier. Sheriff Annie Ferguson, Ruby's sister, is skeptical about Cooper's accusation but slowly starts to believe him. Cooper finds a dental retainer and human teeth in the gravel of his driveway, which he matches to photos of Dale's daughter. Cooper sends his family back to the city while he attempts to gather more evidence against Dale.

Dale smothers his father to death after he reveals knowledge of Dale's crimes. Leah returns to the house alone, after the children inform her of a deep well on the property called the Devil's Throat. She and Cooper find the rotting corpses of Dale's wife and children with a video camera lowered into the well. Cooper contacts Sheriff Ferguson, unaware Dale has attacked her and left her unconscious in her office. Dale goes to the Devil's Throat, punctures Cooper's truck tires, and pushes Leah into the well. Cooper rescues her and they shelter in the house. Dale has torched Leah's car and cut the electricity to the home.

Dale chases Cooper and Leah through the house and onto the roof, threating to kill them and dump their bodies down the Devil's Throat. The couple charges him with rope, knock him down, and bind him to a roof lantern. When Cooper shatters the skylight, Dale falls to his death.

The remains of Dale's victims are entombed with him in the family graveyard at Cold Creek Manor where the Tilsons continue to live.

== Cast ==
- Dennis Quaid as Cooper Tilson
- Sharon Stone as Leah Tilson
- Stephen Dorff as Dale Massie
- Juliette Lewis as Ruby Ferguson
- Kristen Stewart as Kristen Tilson
- Christopher Plummer as Theodore Massie
- Ryan Wilson as Jesse Tilson
- Dana Eskelson as Sheriff Annie Ferguson, Sheriff of Bellingham County

== Production ==
The film was shot on location in Cambridge, Kitchener, Ayr, Brougham, and Toronto, Ontario.

== Release ==
=== Critical response ===
The film received negative reviews from critics. It holds a 12% rating on Rotten Tomatoes based on 109 reviews, with an average rating of 3.8/10. The site's consensus states: "The plot of Cold Creek Manor is too predictable and contrived to generate suspense". On Metacritic — which assigns a weighted mean score — the film has a score of 37 out of 100 based on 31 critics, indicating "generally negative reviews". Audiences surveyed by CinemaScore gave the film a grade "C−" on a scale of A+ to F.

Stephen Holden of The New York Times observed, "A serious filmmaker like Mike Figgis can be forgiven, I suppose, for slumming, when he's got a cast as stellar as the one that infuses the scream-by-numbers thriller Cold Creek Manor with more psychological credibility than its screenplay merits". He said the film "belongs to the Cape Fear tradition of thrillers in which the mettle of a civilized family man is tested in a life-or-death struggle with crude macho evil".

Roger Ebert of the Chicago Sun-Times rated the film 1½ stars and called it "an anthology of cliches" and "a thriller that thrills us only if we abandon all common sense". He added, "Of course, preposterous things happen in all thrillers, but there must be at least a gesture in the direction of plausibility, or we lose patience".

Edward Guthmann of the San Francisco Chronicle said, "As haunted-house thrillers go, Cold Creek Manor is more ludicrous than the average but at the same time more handsomely produced. Hokum with a big-budget gloss, it's a simple, formulaic nail-biter ... The script ... grafts from every possible thriller – most of which had pilfered their predecessors – and loads on implausibilities until we wonder why the actors play it seriously".

Peter Travers of Rolling Stone rated the film one star and commented, "It's sad to see risk-taking director Mike Figgis do a generic thriller for a paycheck and then not even screw with the rules . . . the only things haunting this movie are cliches".

Steve Persall of the St. Petersburg Times graded the film D and thought "all this bad acting and run-of-the-thrill dialogue might be entertaining if something would just happen besides a silly snake scare and a wan truck chase. The movie plays like an all-star episode of This Old House for the first hour, a telenovela for the next 30 minutes, then, finally, a hack boogeyman flick in the last reel. This isn't a movie, it's channel surfing".

Todd McCarthy of Variety called the film "a woefully predictable imperiled-yuppie-family-under-siege suspenser that hardly seems worth the attention of its relatively high-profile participants. Taking a break from his multiple-perspective digicam experiments, helmer Mike Figgis displays at best a half-hearted interest in delivering the commercial genre goods, while Dennis Quaid and Sharon Stone fish in vain to find any angles to play in their dimension-free characters".

=== Box office ===
The film opened in 2,035 theaters in the United States on September 19, 2003, and grossed $8,190,574 in its opening weekend, ranking #5 at the box office, behind Underworld, Secondhand Lions, The Fighting Temptations and Once Upon a Time in Mexico. It eventually earned $21,386,011 in the United States and $7,733,423 in foreign markets, for a total worldwide box office of $29,119,434.

=== Home media ===
Buena Vista Home Entertainment released the film on Region 1 DVD on March 2, 2004. It is in anamorphic widescreen format with audio tracks in English and French, and subtitles in Spanish. Bonus features include commentary with director Mike Figgis; deleted scenes and an alternate ending; Rules of the Game, in which Figgis discusses the components of a psychological thriller; and Cooper's Documentary, in which he discusses the process of making the film within the film. A Blu-ray edition was released on September 4, 2012.
