= Terence Jay =

American actor and musician (born 1985)

Terence Jay (born 1985) is an American actor and musician. He is best known for his role as Jeremy Van Holden in the 2005 film Green Street, playing alongside Elijah Wood, and for writing and performing several songs on the film's soundtrack, including the one played during the film's final sequence, "One Blood". He also played as Zane in the 2007 supernatural horror film Buried Alive in which he is shown playing the guitar and singing. In 2016 Terence Jay formed the company Nirvana Handpan, a business that fabricates custom steel musical instruments called Handpans.

Terence Jay is producer Deborah Del Prete's son.

== Filmography ==
Year	Film	Arranger	Composer	Musician	Actor	Role
2001	Ricochet River	No	No	No	Yes	Joey Goode
2005	Green Street Hooligans	No	Yes	Yes	Yes	Jeremy Van Holden
2007	Buried Alive	No	Yes	Yes	Yes	Zane
2007	Undead or Alive: A Zombedy			Yes	No	Performing the song "Undead or Alive"
2008	Punisher: War Zone	Yes	No	Yes	No	
2008	Living Hell		Yes	Yes	Yes	Sgt. Arbogast; performing the song "Demon"
2009	Green Street 2: Stand Your Ground			Yes	Yes	Joss Abbott
2018	Locating Silver Lake		No	Yes	Yes	Street musician

== See also ==
- Deborah Del Prete
