= The Wedding Planner =

2001 film by Adam Shankman

- Theatrical release poster
- Directed by: Adam Shankman
- Written by: Pamela Falk; Michael Ellis
- Produced by: Peter Abrams; Robert L. Levy; Gigi Pritzker; Deborah Del Prete; Jennifer Gibgot
- Starring: Jennifer Lopez; Matthew McConaughey; Bridgette Wilson-Sampras; Justin Chambers; Alex Rocco
- Cinematography: Julio Macat
- Edited by: Lisa Zeno Churgin
- Music by: Mervyn Warren
- Production companies: Columbia Pictures; Intermedia Films; Tapestry Films; Dee Gee Entertainment; Prufrock Pictures
- Distributed by: Sony Pictures Releasing
- Release date: January 26, 2001
- Running time: 103 minutes
- Country: United States
- Language: English
- Budget: $28–35 million
- Box office: $94.7 million

The Wedding Planner is a 2001 American romantic comedy film directed by Adam Shankman, in his feature film directorial debut, written by Pamela Falk and Michael Ellis, and starring Jennifer Lopez and Matthew McConaughey.

The Wedding Planner was released by Sony Pictures Releasing on January 26, 2001. The film received negative reviews from critics and grossed $94.7 million against a $28–35 million budget.

== Plot ==
Ambitious San Francisco wedding planner Mary Fiore is reintroduced to childhood acquaintance Massimo by her father Salvatore, who wants them to marry, but Mary declines. She hopes that her boss, Geri, will make her a partner at their company, and is hired to plan heiress Fran Donolly's society wedding to long-term boyfriend Eddie. While reporting her success to colleague Penny on the phone, Mary gets her shoe heel stuck in a manhole cover. As she struggles to free herself, a taxicab collides with a dumpster that hurtles towards her. A man pulls her out of the way, and she thanks him before fainting.

Waking up in hospital, Mary meets her rescuer, pediatrician Steve Edison. Penny invites Steve to attend an alfresco screening of Two Tickets to Broadway with them but makes an excuse to leave the pair alone. Mary and Steve dance but are interrupted by a downpour before they can kiss.

At a dance lesson with a client, Mary encounters Fran, who introduces her to her fiancé "Eddie", none other than Steve. Fran leaves them to dance together, and Mary rebukes Steve for leading her on behind Fran's back. Penny reminds Mary that her career is more important than her feelings and persuades her to continue planning Fran and Steve's wedding.

On a visit to a potential wedding venue in Napa Valley, Massimo appears and, to Mary's horror, introduces himself as her fiancé. While riding through the estate with Fran's parents, Mrs. Donolly's singing frightens Mary's horse. Steve rescues Mary again and admonishes her for condemning his actions when she was also engaged.

At home, Mary scolds her father for trying to set her up with Massimo. Salvatore reveals that his marriage to her mother, which Mary has viewed as the perfect relationship, was arranged and only became a loving relationship later, leaving Mary conflicted.

While visiting another venue, Fran reveals that she is going on a week-long business trip and leaves Mary and Steve to continue preparations. They apologize for their angry words and become friends. They run into Wendy and Keith, whom Mary reveals was her fiancé until she caught him cheating with Wendy on the night of their rehearsal dinner.

Intoxicated and struggling to get into her apartment, Mary breaks down, lamenting that Keith is married and expecting a baby while she is alone and miserable. Steve gets Mary inside and comforts her as she sobers. Steve leaves but quickly returns and confesses his feelings for Mary. She replies that she respects Fran too much to let anything happen between them and sends Steve away.

Fran confesses to Mary that she is unsure if she is still in love with Steve. Ignoring her own heart, Mary convinces Fran to continue with the wedding. At a birthday party, Massimo offers Mary a heartfelt proposal, and she reluctantly accepts; the two couples prepare for their respective weddings. Leaving Penny to coordinate the Donolly wedding, Mary goes to marry Massimo at the town hall. Steve asks Fran if they are doing the right thing, and she admits that she does not want to get married. They part amicably, Fran leaving to enjoy their honeymoon alone. Penny reveals Mary's marriage plans to Steve, and he rushes to stop her.

At the town hall, Massimo and Mary prepare to marry, but her father stops the ceremony, realizing the wedding is not what Mary wants. Mary, having given up on true love, insists that life is not a fairy tale and that marrying Massimo is the right thing to do, but realizes he is not the one for her and leaves.

Steve arrives to find Salvatore and Massimo, who reveals that he could not proceed with the wedding knowing Mary was in love with Steve. Steve reveals his feelings to Salvatore, who encourages him to go after her. Steve and Massimo ride off on Massimo's scooter to the park, where another outdoor movie is starting. Steve finds Mary and asks her to dance, and they kiss.

== Cast ==
- Jennifer Lopez as Mary Fiore
- Matthew McConaughey as Steve Edison
- Bridgette Wilson-Sampras as Fran Donolly
- Justin Chambers as Massimo Lenzetti
- Judy Greer as Penny Nicholson
- Alex Rocco as Salvatore Fiore
- Joanna Gleason as Mrs. Donolly
- Charles Kimbrough as Mr. Donolly
- Fred Willard as Basil St. Mosely
- Lou Myers as Burt Weinberg
- Frances Bay as Dottie
- Kevin Pollak as Dr. John Dojny
- Kathy Najimy as Geri

== Production ==
=== Casting ===
The original actors set to play Mary and Steve were Jennifer Love Hewitt and Brendan Fraser, respectively. They were replaced with Sarah Michelle Gellar and Freddie Prinze Jr. Both couples eventually dropped out due to scheduling conflicts with Buffy the Vampire Slayer for Gellar, leaving Lopez and McConaughey to be the eventual stars. Fraser would eventually star in Bedazzled rather than The Wedding Planner.

=== Filming ===
Many of the scenes were shot in Golden Gate Park in San Francisco, specifically at the Music Concourse (between the old De Young Museum and the old California Academy of Sciences), the Japanese Tea Garden and The Huntington Library and Gardens. The first wedding ceremony is filmed inside the chapel at Stanford University.

== Reception ==
The Wedding Planner was released in the United States on January 26, 2001, by Sony Pictures Releasing.

=== Box office ===
The Wedding Planner grossed $60.4 million in the United States and Canada, and $34.3 million in other territories, for a worldwide total of $94.7 million.

In the United States and Canada, the film grossed $13.5 million from 2,785 theaters on its opening weekend (the Super Bowl weekend), opening at number one at the box office. Lopez's second album J.Lo reached number one on the Billboard 200 the same week, making Lopez the first entertainer to achieve a number-one album and film simultaneously in the same week.

=== Critical response ===
The Wedding Planner received generally negative reviews from critics. On the review aggregator website Rotten Tomatoes, the film holds an approval rating of 17% based on 106 reviews, with an average rating of 3.9/10. The consensus reads, "Instead of being light and charming, this romantic comedy is heavy-handed and contrived in its execution. Also, it's too unoriginal." Metacritic, which uses a weighted average, assigned the film a score of 33 out of 100, based on 29 critics, indicating "generally unfavorable" reviews.

Entertainment Weekly's Lisa Schwarzbaum compared the film unfavorably to My Best Friend's Wedding, writing, "Where Julia Roberts turned the world on with her huggability, Lopez's vibe is that of someone afraid to get mussed. And where Rupert Everett was divine as a sidekick, McConaughey is mortally ordinary as a main dish who spends most of his time smiling like a party guest." Kimberly Jones of The Austin Chronicle noted that the two leading characters being mistreated was the biggest disappointment from The Wedding Planner, feeling that while Lopez and McConaughey have "enormous charisma" (referencing Lopez's work on 1998's Out of Sight as an example), the "blandness of The Wedding Planner burlap-sacks their appeal in an altogether dowdy outing for two stars who deserve much snazzier threads." A. O. Scott of The New York Times wrote that the "undeniable charisma" of the film's stars along with their "goofiness" makes "The Wedding Planner more painless than it has a right to be." Variety's Robert Koehler described The Wedding Planner as "an attractive bridesmaid but hardly a gorgeous bride among romantic comedies." Michael Thomson from the BBC wrote, "Unfortunately, after the two leads become less wired in each other's presence, and the sexual tension begins to droop, everyone seems to be reading an autocue." For her role in the film, Lopez was nominated for Worst Actress at the 22nd Golden Raspberry Awards.
