= Sabacolypse: A Change Gon' Come =

Studio album by Sabac Red
- Released: June 15, 2004
- Studios: Powerhouse Studios (New York, NY)
- Genre: Hip-hop
- Length: 1:03:17
- Label: Psycho+Logical-Records
- Producer: Necro (also exec.)

Sabac Red chronology
The Future Is Now (2002)	Sabacolypse: A Change Gon' Come (2004)	The Ritual (2008)

Professional ratings
Review scores
Source	Rating
AllHipHop	3.5/5 stars
AltRap.com	7/10
HipHopDX	8/10
RapReviews	7.5/10

Sabacolypse: A Change Gon' Come is the debut solo studio album by American rapper Sabac Red. It was released on June 15, 2004, via Psycho+Logical-Records. Production was handled entirely by Necro. It features guest appearances from Antwon Lamar Robinson, Cenophia Mitchell, Dash Mihok, Immortal Technique, Jamal Joseph, Mr. Hyde, Necro, Q-Unique, Roosevelt Phillip, Vinnie Paz, and his fellow Non Phixion groupmates. A music video was made for "A Change Gon' Come (Militant Metal Mix)"

The instrumental for "Positive and Negative" was originally used on a Non-Phixion demo that got them signed to Geffen Records when MC Serch from 3rd Bass was still in Non-Phixion.

== Track listing ==
No.	Title	Writer(s)	Length
1.	"Intro"	John Fuentes; Ron Braunstein	0:34
2.	"Organize"	Fuentes; R. Braunstein	3:59
3.	"Sabacolypse"	Fuentes; R. Braunstein	3:44
4.	"Positive and Negative" (featuring Necro)	Fuentes; R. Braunstein	4:22
5.	"Revelation 1" (featuring Jamal Joseph)	Fuentes; Jamal Joseph; R. Braunstein	1:02
6.	"Protest Music"	Fuentes; R. Braunstein	3:41
7.	"Bac's Anthem"	Fuentes; R. Braunstein	1:27
8.	"Fight Until the End" (featuring Immortal Technique and Roosevelt Phillip)	Fuentes; Felipe Coronel; R. Braunstein	5:24
9.	"Revelation 2" (featuring Jamal Joseph)	Fuentes; Joseph; R. Braunstein	1:18
10.	"The Scientist (AIDS)"	Fuentes; R. Braunstein	3:46
11.	"P.O.W.'s" (featuring Mr. Hyde, Necro, Goretex and Ill Bill)	Fuentes; Christopher Catenacci; R. Braunstein; Mitchell Manzanilla; William Braunstein	3:59
12.	"Vinyl (Bacapella)"	Fuentes; R. Braunstein	1:20
13.	"Unsolved Mysteries"	Fuentes; R. Braunstein	4:34
14.	"Revelation 3" (featuring Jamal Joseph)	Fuentes; Joseph; R. Braunstein	1:32
15.	"A Change Gon' Come" (featuring Antwon Lamar Robinson)	Fuentes; R. Braunstein	4:13
16.	"Urban Gorillas" (featuring Vinnie Paz and Q-Unique)	Fuentes; Vincenzo Luvineri; Anthony Quiles; R. Braunstein	4:42
17.	"Speak Militant"	Fuentes; R. Braunstein	3:18
18.	"Freestyle Freedom"	Fuentes; R. Braunstein	1:54
19.	"I Have a Dream" (featuring Dash Mihok and Cenophia Mitchell)	Fuentes; Dashiell Mihok; R. Braunstein	4:23
20.	"A Change Gon' Come (Militant Metal Mix)" (featuring Antwon Lamar Robinson)	Fuentes; R. Braunstein	3:54
Total length:			1:03:17

== Personnel ==
- John "Sabac Red" Fuentes – vocals, arranger, recording, mixing, artwork, photography
- Ron "Necro" Braunstein – vocals (tracks: 4, 11), Fender Jazz Bass (tracks: 15, 18), guitar & bass (track 20), producer, recording, mixing, executive producer, photography
- Jamal Joseph – spoken word (tracks: 5, 9, 14)
- Felipe "Immortal Technique" Coronel – vocals (track 8)
- Roosevelt Phillip – vocals (track 8)
- Christopher "Mr. Hyde" Catenacci – vocals (track 11)
- Mitchell "Goretex" Manzanilla – vocals (track 11)
- William "Ill Bill" Braunstein – vocals (track 11)
- Antwon Lamar Robinson – vocals (tracks: 15, 20)
- Vincenzo "Vinnie Paz" Luvineri – vocals (track 16)
- Anthony "Q-Unique" Quiles – vocals (track 16)
- Dash Mihok – vocals (track 19)
- Cenophia Mitchell – vocals (track 19), backing vocals (tracks: 4, 9, 14, 18)
- Eric "DJ Eclipse" Winn – scratches (tracks: 4, 17)
- Elliott Thomas – piano (tracks: 9, 14, 18), recording, mixing
- Charles De Montebello – mastering
- Hobin Choi – photography
- Ricky Powell – photography
- C. Ramirez – photography
- J.P. – photography
