= Vincent Piazza =

American actor

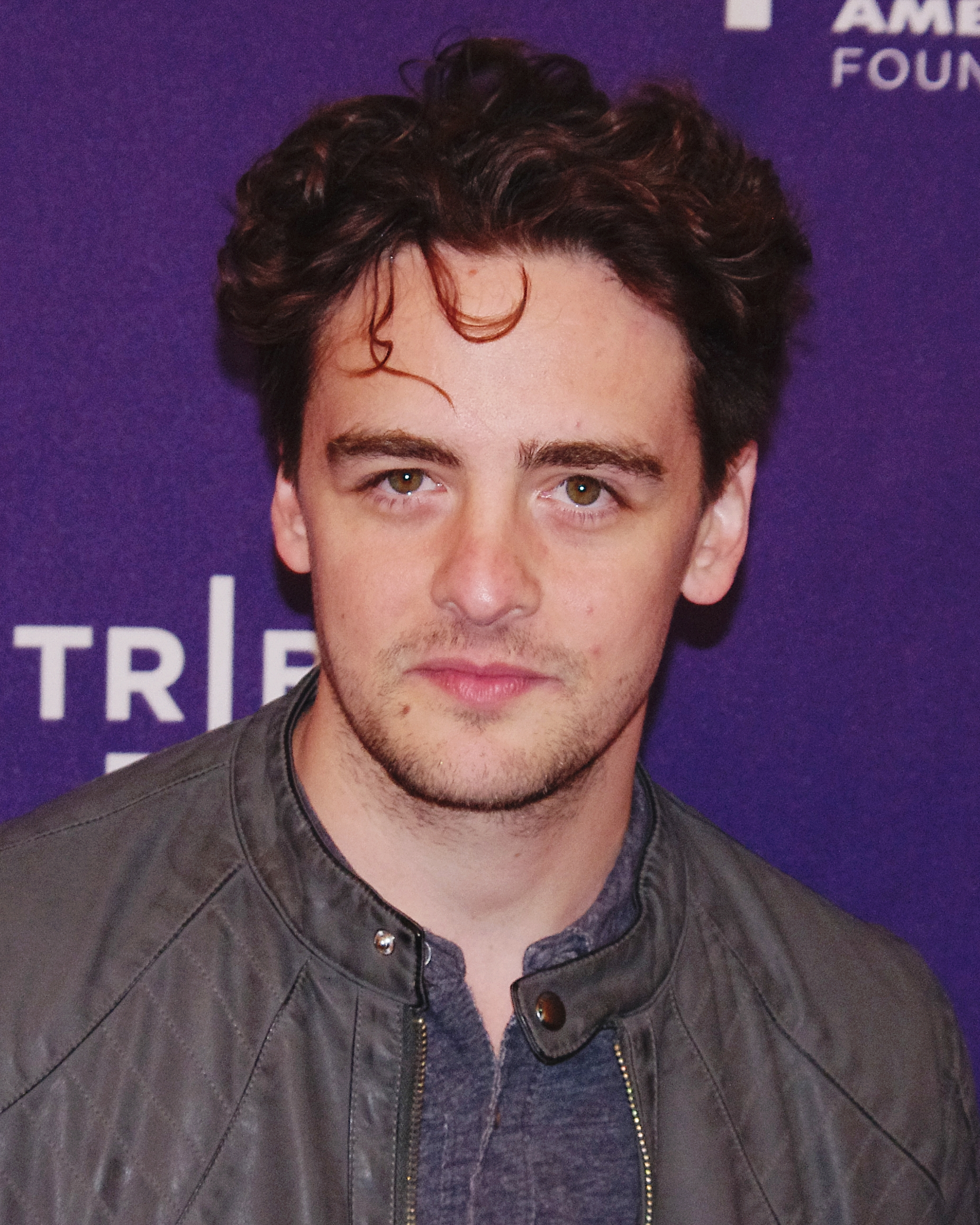
- Piazza in 2012
- Born: 1975 or 1976 (age 50–51); New York City, U.S.
- Occupation: Actor
- Years active: 2005–present

Vincent Piazza (born 1975 or 1976) is an American actor. He is best known for his portrayal of gangster Lucky Luciano in the HBO television series Boardwalk Empire. He has also played Earl Hefner in the comedy-drama Rocket Science (2007) and singer Tommy DeVito in Clint Eastwood's film adaptation of Jersey Boys (2014).

== Early life and education ==
Piazza was born in Middle Village, Queens, New York City, and raised in nearby Maspeth. His father is Italian, having immigrated to the United States in the early 1960s. His mother is of German descent.

Piazza played ACHA Division I-AA ice hockey for Villanova University, until a shoulder injury forced him to quit playing and leave the university after a year.

== Career ==
After retiring from hockey, he began to work with acting coach Alice Spivak and joined the TerraNOVA Collective theatre group in Lion Theatre along Theatre Row in New York City. After appearing in a number of New York Off Broadway productions, including Baby Steps, A Match Made in Manhattan and Much Ado About Nothing, he made his feature film debut in the 2006 film Stephanie Daley and went on to appear in the television movie The Dawn and an episode of Law & Order: Criminal Intent.

Piazza has appeared in three episodes of the television series The Sopranos; the eighth, eleventh and thirteenth episodes of the show's sixth season. He describes his experience working on the show as "incredible" and says he would appear in any prequels or sequels to the series if he was asked. He then featured in the 2007 film Rocket Science as Earl Hefner, the kleptomaniac older brother of the film's protagonist. After auditioning at a casting session held at a New York acting school, he ended up being one of the first actors cast, writer-director Jeffrey Blitz saying: "Vince brought just the right combination of humor and threat to the part ... [I] kept many of the rest of the choices Vince brought to Earl. He's a very physical actor and a very funny one, too." He went on to appear in the independent films Goodbye Baby, Tie a Yellow Ribbon and Apology, as well as guest-starring in an episode of Law & Order, before he landed the recurring role of Tony in Rescue Me's fourth season.

Piazza appeared in the 2008 film Assassination of a High School President in the role of Ricky Delacruz. He had originally unsuccessfully auditioned for a different part, but Brett Simon, the film's director, was fond of his performance in Rocket Science and so suggested that he take on another role. In order to master a Hispanic accent for the role, he visited a woman he knew who runs a Puerto Rican theatre in Manhattan and usually coached Puerto Ricans to adapt American accents, to have her coach him to read his lines in a thick Puerto Rican accent. He also completed a television pilot directed by Brett Ratner, Blue Blood, for which he had a seven-year contract if the series had been picked up by NBC.

Piazza was then cast as a series regular on Boardwalk Empire in 2009 as real life Italian-American mobster Lucky Luciano, appearing in all five seasons. In 2013, Piazza won the role of Tommy DeVito in the Clint Eastwood-directed adaptation of the Broadway musical Jersey Boys. Piazza had to take vocal, guitar, and dance lessons to play DeVito, one of the founding members of the band The Four Seasons.

== Personal life ==
Piazza was in a relationship with singer Ashlee Simpson from June 2011 to November 2012. As of May 21, 2018, he was engaged to actress Genesis Rodriguez but the relationship ended shortly after they became engaged.

== Filmography ==
=== Film ===
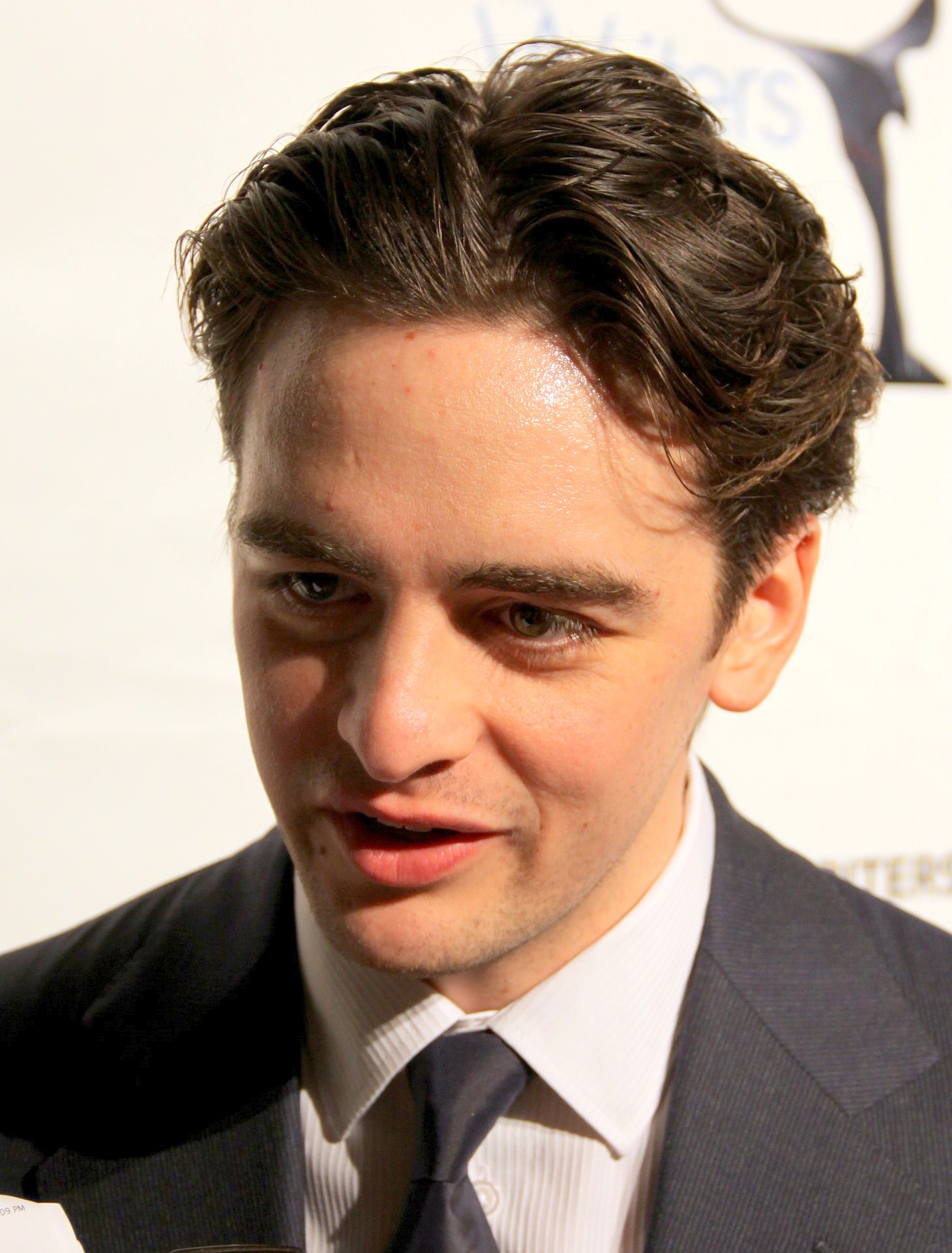
Vincent Piazza in February 2011

Year	Title	Role	Notes
2005	Color of a Doubt: an Urban Fable	Chris Parker	
2006	Stephanie Daley	Geoff	
2006	The Dawn	Scott	
2007	Rocket Science	Earl Hefner	
2007	Goodbye Baby	Dominick	
2007	Tie a Yellow Ribbon	Ed	
2008	Assassination of a High School President	Ricky Delacruz	
2010	Polish Bar	Reuben	
2014	3 Nights in the Desert	Barry	
2014	Jersey Boys	Tommy DeVito	
2015	The Wannabe	Thomas	
2016	The Intervention	Peter	
2017	Never Here	Andy Williams	
2017	The Girl Who Invented Kissing	Jimmy	
2020	Centigrade	Matt	
2020	618 to Omaha	Ed Merriweather	Short film

=== Television ===
Year	Title	Role	Notes
2006	Law & Order: Criminal Intent	Eric Newsome	Episode: "Wrongful Life"
2007	The Sopranos	Hernan O'Brien	3 episodes
2007	Law & Order	Peter Harris	Episode: "Over Here"
2007	Rescue Me	Tony	6 episodes
2008	Blue Blood	Bobby Moran	TV pilot
2009	How I Met Your Mother	Bus Boy	Episode: "The Rough Patch"
2010–2014	Boardwalk Empire	Lucky Luciano	Main Cast
2019	The Passage	Clark Richards	
2021	Pacific Rim: The Black	Joel	Animated series; voice role
2021	Money, Explained	Scam Artist	docuseries; Episode: "Get Rich Quick"
2022–present	Tulsa King	Vince Antonacci	Main role
2024	Batman: Caped Crusader	Tony Zito	Voice role
