= Johnny Flynton =

- Directed by: Lexi Alexander
- Written by: Lexi Alexander; Fabian Marquez
- Produced by: Christopher R. Mans
- Starring: Dash Mihok; Michele Matheson; Robert W. Hill; Austin Crim
- Cinematography: Alexander Buono
- Edited by: Christopher Klonecke
- Music by: Christopher Franke
- Production companies: Hunter Films; Red Corner Productions
- Release date: September 21, 2002
- Running time: 37 minutes
- Country: United States
- Language: English

Johnny Flynton is a 2002 American short film directed and co-written by Lexi Alexander. It was nominated for Best Live Action Short Film at the 75th Academy Awards.

== Plot ==
Based on a true story and starring Dash Mihok in the title role, the film follows an undefeated boxer, Johnny Flynton, in a small Alabama town on the day of a local exhibition fight that sparks a series of tragic events.

== Cast ==
- Dash Mihok as Johnny Flynton
- Michele Matheson as Samantha Flynton
- Robert W. Hill as Sheriff Mayer
- Austin Crim as Teddy
- Georgine Gainey as Mrs. Derouville
- Raymond Thorne as Coach Tagwood
- Jim Lampley as himself
- Pat E. Johnson as Referee (as Pat Johnson)

== Background ==
Johnny Flynton was the first film Alexander directed. She said that the film, about a boxer from Alabama who is charged with murder, is a fictional story that was inspired by meeting a boxer in Germany when she was 9 years old, an interaction that she remembered and was the basis of the idea for the film.

== Production ==
The film, which Alexander entirely financed with a year's income from coaching martial arts, had a budget of $35,000.

== Reception ==
A Film Threat review says, "Fuck 'Rocky,' this is the best film about a boxer that I've ever seen."
