= Rob Garcia =

Boxing coach

Rob Garcia is a professional boxing and conditioning coach, based out of San Diego, California.

== Biography ==
Garcia was born in Los Angeles, but was raised in Hawaii, where he had a long career as an amateur boxer. He eventually moved back to the mainland U.S., graduating from San Diego State University in 1997 with a degree in Exercise Science. After college, he started studying under renowned strength and conditioning experts such as Paul Chek, and then became the youngest coach ever selected for the U.S. Boxing Team.

He started training professional athletes immediately afterwards, and in 2001, was selected by Oscar De La Hoya to be his head Strength and Conditioning Coach. He stayed in this position for 8 years, working alongside De La Hoya's boxing coaches Freddie Roach and Floyd Mayweather Sr. continuously. Absorbing the knowledge learned from two of boxing's greatest coaches, Garcia became a professional boxing coach himself as well as continuing his conditioning career.

He currently coaches professional boxers and MMA fighters such as K. J. Noons and Joe Duarte at The Arena, the well-known MMA gym based out of San Diego.
