= Living Hell (film) =

2008 film by Richard Jefferies

- Written by: Richard Jefferies
- Directed by: Richard Jefferies
- Starring: Johnathon Schaech; Erica Leerhsen; James McDaniel
- Theme music composer: Ivan Koutikov
- Country of origin: United States
- Original language: English

Production
- Producers: David S. Greathouse; Deborah Del Prete; Gigi Pritzker
- Cinematography: Eric Leach
- Editor: Russell Denove

Original release
- Network: Sci Fi Channel
- Release: June 10, 2008

Living Hell (released on DVD as Organizm) is a 2008 horror television film written and directed by Richard Jefferies, which stars Johnathon Schaech and Erica Leerhsen. It premiered on Sci Fi Channel on February 23, and was released on DVD on June 10, 2008.

Budgeted at an estimated $4,500,000, the film was shot in only 29 days.

== Plot ==
In 1969, ten-year-old Frank Sears is confronted by his hysterical mother Eleanore, who carves the message "S3 V12" into the palms of his hands with a pencil and warns him to never forget her warning before murdering her husband and committing suicide.

In the present, Frank is now a biology teacher haunted by the night his mother died. Having tried to forget about her warnings, he conducted an internet search that led him to drive all the way from New Jersey to the town of Bennell, New Mexico in an attempt to visit the Army base Fort Lambert. After being turned away he is forced to break through the gates of the base and is detained, at which point he explains his story to Carrie Freeborn and her wheelchair-using husband Glenn: his mother once worked at the base and warned him that something terrible was stored there, in "Sublevel 3, Vault 12." The Freeborns find no evidence of Elenore Sears in their records, and their documents of the base's decontamination indicate that the vault was empty. However, on another check, they discover the back wall is hollow and immediately begin excavation against Frank's warnings. Inside is a sealed tank, and on the orders of Colonel Erik Maitland a quarantine is set up so the tank can be opened by Carrie's team, consisting of herself, Torbin Struss, Gayle Osterloh and Aneta McQueen.

They discover a man's corpse with evidence of disease inside, but when Carrie attempts to biopsy the infected tissue, the infection comes alive in the form of giant, rapidly growing plantlike roots. Struss is immediately killed when he tries to bolt the tank closed, and the organism grows out of the room in moments. An evacuation is declared, but Glen, Osterloh and many other soldiers are killed. Carrie frees Frank and confronts him with images of the man in the tank, but he is unresponsive. The soldiers withdraw into Bennell to form a response, and Frank realizes that Carrie meant that the man in the tank was his real father.

Frank and Carrie seek out Virgil Redwing, a shopowner who Frank thought recognized him when he asked for directions earlier. They learn that Virgil, Frank's father and Eleanore all worked at the base in 1958 and recover a package left to Virgil before Frank's father died. However, the organism reaches the abandoned church and kills Virgil. Frank and Carrie rescue Virgil's granddaughter Kaz and discover a film inside the package. Kaz advises them they can find a projector at her school, where the town has been evacuated to.

At the school, Frank and Carrie watch the film within the package, which is of Frank's father Yevgeni Tarasov, a Russian scientist who defected to the US and accidentally created the organism within his own body. Frank is infected by a sample given to Carrie by an elderly resident, but the organism dies within his body; he realizes that his blood possesses antibodies that can kill the organism due to his heritage.

The town is evacuated, and before his death, General Kenneth Lavigne orders a nuclear strike. However, Carrie and Frank realize this will cause disaster, as the organism can use any heat or light to grow further. Frank covers Carrie in his blood for protection and they fly in a stolen helicopter back to Fort Lambert so they can kill the organism. Inside, Carrie finds a boil on the vines with Glen's body inside and accidentally bursts it, washing off the blood. However, before she is killed, Frank uses his blood to kill the nucleus in his father's body. The nuclear strike is averted and the world is saved. Maitland, realizing they may have survived, sends an evacuation in to rescue them.

== Cast ==
- Johnathon Schaech as Frank Sears
  - Schaech also appears as Yevgeni Tarasov, the father of Frank Sears
  - Angelo Martinez as Young Frank Sears
- Erica Leerhsen as Carrie Freeborn
- James McDaniel as Colonel Erik Maitland
- Jason Wiles as Glenn Freeborn
- Terence Jay as Sergeant Arbogast
- Charissa Allen as Private First Class Aneta McQueen
- Dylan Kenin as Sergeant Teegarden
- Jude Herrera as Private First Class Una Fernandes
- Vic Chao as Sergeant Kinoshita
- Josh Berry as Torbin Struss
- Daniel Beer as Tristam Sears
- Rick Herod as General Kenneth Lavigne
- Joshua Rollins as Kermit Shourt
- Darlene Kegan as Eleanore Sears
- Liezl Carstens as Gayle Osterloh
- Lew Alexander as Virgil Redwing
- Haleigh Sanderson as Kaz Redwing
- Fredrick Lopez as Perry Redwing
- John Weitz as PA Announcer (voice)
- Daniel Hubbert as Air Traffic Controller
- Brad Hulleman as Army Soldier

== Reception ==
DVD Talk said the film "is fun midnight movie fare - and it's all right to laugh at it. Ultimately, it's forgettable, so I'll go with a Rent It recommendation." Dread Central said the film "fails to live up to its name in terms of horror, but at least it also fails to live up to its name in terms of horribleness. At best, it’s merely so-so."
