= Richard Jefferies (screenwriter) =

American screenwriter (born 1956)

- Born: Richard L. Jefferies; March 1956 (age 70)
- Education: California Institute of the Arts
- Occupations: Screenwriter, film producer, film director and editor

Richard L. Jefferies (born March 1956) is an American screenwriter, film producer, film director and editor. He wrote and executive produced Cold Creek Manor. He was a screenwriter on Tron Legacy for Disney Studios and directed the 2008 Syfy Original film Living Hell. Jefferies partners with writer/director/producer Ethan Wiley in transmedia production company Wiseacre Films.

== Career ==
Jefferies' father was a movie theater manager. He studied from 1974 to 1978 at California Institute of the Arts. Together with Mark Kirkland he won a Student Academy Award for his animated short film Fame about a song by David Bowie. After his studies, Jefferies founded New Hollywood Inc. together with David Koenigsberg, Osvaldo Zornizer and Mark Kirkland.

His work on Fantastic Four: Rise of the Silver Surfer and Tron: Legacy was not credited.

== Filmography ==
- 1982: Blood Tide
- 1984: Action Impossible
- 1988: 14 Going on 30
- 1988: Scarecrows
- 1992: The Vagrant
- 1995: Man of the House
- 2003: Cold Creek Manor
- 2007: Fantastic Four: Rise of the Silver Surfer
- 2008: Living Hell
- 2010: Tron: Legacy
- 2012: Elf-Man
- Canceled: adaptation of Dean Koontz's novel The Bad Place
- Canceled: Sonic: Wonders of the World
