= Buried Alive (2007 film) =

- Promotional poster
- Directed by: Robert Kurtzman
- Written by: Art Monterastelli
- Produced by: David Greathouse; Deborah Del Prete; Gigi Pritzker
- Starring: Tobin Bell; Terence Jay; Leah Rachel; Erin Michelle Lokitz; Lindsey Scott; Steve Sandvoss and Germaine De Leon
- Cinematography: Thomas Callaway
- Edited by: Cari Coughlin
- Music by: Terence Jay
- Production company: DarkLot Entertainment
- Distributed by: Dimension Extreme
- Release date: October 23, 2007
- Running time: 94 minutes
- Country: United States
- Language: English

Buried Alive is a 2007 supernatural slasher film starring Terence Jay, Leah Rachel, and Tobin Bell, about a group of college students stalked by a vengeful spirit during a New Mexico road trip. It was a straight-to-DVD release distributed by Dimension Extreme. This film was a Blockbuster Exclusive.

== Plot ==
Rene is in the bath having a conversation with her cousin Zane, who is in the bathroom with her. He pushes her underwater, and she begins to drown. While looking up at his face from under the water, she sees the visage of an old woman above her. She awakes with a start, having fallen asleep and begun to drown. Her boyfriend Danny wakes her up, and the two make out.

Zane, who has enlisted the help of Phil to research his family history, visits his family home with Phil, Rene, Danny, and her two sorority pledges, Julie "Cow" and Laura "Dog". The two pledges have been forced to dress up as animals as an initiation. Zane constantly sees an old woman on the side of the road, culminating in her appearance in the middle of the road, which causes him to almost crash.

Lester, the caretaker, is living in a trailer on the land, searching for gold. He has found some, but does not tell anyone. The college students marvel at his stuffed oddities, since he is an amateur taxidermist. He warns the group not to go into the subcellar, or to go outside after dark.

Settling in, Rene enslaves Julie and Laura and forces Phil to explain how he knows so much about Rene and Zane's family history. Phil goes outside to get a signal on his mobile phone, but is cut in half by a ghost armed with an axe.

The five remaining teens decide to learn more about the family history. Rene has fun with Julie and Laura by making them perform "The Godiva Run", a college sorority tradition of running with the participate only wearing one item of clothing and it can't be an overcoat. The girls are dared to perform The Godiva Run to Lester's caravan and bring back one of his stuffed animals. Julie chooses to wear her pants and Laura chooses to wear her boots with Laura boldly and happily streaking naked through the desert towards Lester's caravan and accomplishes the task, but Julie doesn't because she sprains her ankle.

Rene gives Julie one more task to take off her clothes, except for underwear, and be blindfolded. Rene takes Zane's belt and uses it on Julie as a test of trust. Soon, Rene and Laura depart, leaving Julie standing there. Danny decides to go get Phil but finds out that he's dead just before his face is cut off. When the lights go out, Zane goes out to check the machine to find it's still functioning normally, but the cable was cut. Zane finds Danny's faceless body, as do Rene and Laura. Zane, Rene and Laura dash back inside the house, thinking Lester is behind Danny's murder, but they find Lester dead as well.

They try to escape with their car, but find it has been sabotaged. They grab Lester's keys and Laura dashes to Lester's caravan to get his truck. While Zane and Rene are still in the house, Zane gets locked in another room and Rene is knocked unconscious with the spirit scratching the words "Sins Of The Father" on her back. Zane finally breaks through and kills the woman, but whilst barricading them in a room, the woman appears and knocks Zane unconscious.

Laura returns with Lester's truck and the woman is about to slaughter Laura, but disappears after seeing a tattoo that's similar to the necklace Rene had throughout the movie. Laura escapes, while Rene and Zane wake to find themselves in some kind of box. The old woman quickly grabs the necklace and drops the gold ring taken by the caretaker in the beginning of the movie. Rene and Zane scream in fear as the old woman buries them alive.

== Cast ==
- Tobin Bell as Lester
- Leah Rachel as Rene
- Terence Jay as Zane
- Erin Michelle Lokitz as Laura
- Lindsey Scott as Julie
- Steve Sandvoss as Danny
- Germaine De Leon as Phil
- Beth Biasella as the Desert Witch

== See also ==
- List of American films of 2007
