= Green Street 2: Stand Your Ground =

- Directed by: Jesse V. Johnson
- Written by: T. Jay O'Brien
- Produced by: Deborah Del Prete; Linda McDonough
- Starring: Ross McCall; Suzanne May; Vernon Wells; Graham McTavish; Marina Sirtis
- Cinematography: Jonathan Hall
- Edited by: Cari Coughlin
- Music by: Terence Jay
- Production company: OddLot Entertainment
- Distributed by: Lionsgate Home Entertainment
- Release date: 23 March 2009
- Running time: 94 minutes
- Countries: United Kingdom; United States
- Language: English
- Budget: $1 million

Green Street 2: Stand Your Ground (also known as Green Street 2, Hooligans 2:Stand Your Ground and Green Street Hooligans 2: Stand Your Ground) is a 2009 drama film directed by Jesse V. Johnson and written by T. Jay O'Brien.

It is a sequel to the 2005 film Green Street. Green Street 3: Never Back Down followed in 2013.

== Plot ==
Dave Bjorno, along with other members of the Green Street Elite, are arrested for participating in the fight at the end of the first film, and end up being sent to a tough prison. In prison, the GSE quickly discover the brutality of life on the inside, as they are constant targets of the superior numbered and better-financed Chelsea crew. After a quick brawl, the GSE get blamed for the assault and are transported to another prison where a huge number of Bushwackers are waiting for them. Soon after arrival the crew meet up with Marc and his crew, who declare their intentions to make the GSE's time in the prison a real misery. After throwing an insult about their deceased leader, Pete, they fight, are restrained and are, once again, blamed for the incident.

Soon after, Dave meets up with some Russian supporters, who offer him advice about surviving in prison. They soon find out that this is not easy, because the Bushwackers are aided by a high ranking prison officer, Veronica, who flagrantly abuses her power to aid them, and also provides them with cigarettes and drugs. She also gives them a key to go where they want, which they use to attack a GSE member in Segregation, who is only narrowly rescued by an officer, Officer Mason, who also aids the GSE. They also use this key to gain access to and punish inmates who either cross them or do not follow on with payments.

The GSE realize that in order to survive, they need to stand their ground and, with the assistance of Dave, they corner and assault two of the Millwall fans. Soon after this Marc threatens Dave. Dave uses Marc's tactic against him and by beating up the Millwall fans and pretending to be the victims. Angered, Marc gains access to segregation where Dave is sleeping after being sent there and assaults him. However, after one too many Pete taunts, Dave gains the upper hand and is seen to be winning the brawl until Veronica and several police officers break it up.

Due to lack of space, the prison Governor asks Veronica and Officer Mason to select 60 people to set free, under the circumstances that they will not damage society if let go. Veronica intentionally chooses most of the Millwall fans, even though they are mostly troublesome, but the Governor spots this. Officer Mason provides a more suitable list of which he agrees to, apart from the three members of the GSE who have been trouble since they came. Veronica then asks for three of her Millwall fans to be set free instead, but the Governor has an idea to let them compete for this prize by arranging a football match.

Marc notices Dave's girlfriend at several visiting days and orders two of his friends on the outside to keep her hostage. Marc threatens Dave that he will kill his girlfriend unless he throws the match. Before the match begins, Dave informs his friend, Max of what is going to happen and tells him to call his friend to go over to the house and save his girlfriend.

As the match begins, a gruesome fight breaks out while play is going on and Dave deliberately plays badly so Millwall can win. However, the GSE arrive at Dave's house to save his girlfriend. Max then gives Dave the signal that she is okay, and Dave stops throwing the game. Millwall stand no chance with West Ham outplaying them completely and Dave scoring the winning goal. After the game ends, Marc, now distressed at Dave, goes up to him and threatens him, but Dave laughs in his face. He then orders his men to kill Dave's girlfriend, only to discover that the GSE are at the other end of his phone. At that moment, he and his two friends are detained for kidnapping Dave's girlfriend and Veronica is also arrested on a charge of drugs trafficking (Officer Mason had secretly informed on her). Officer Mason is promoted and Dave and his friends are set free.

The film ends with the three boys out of prison and, though Dave wants to spend time with his girlfriend, the GSE have organized a party for them to celebrate, which they accept.

== Cast ==
- Ross McCall as Dave Bjorno
- Graham McTavish as Marc "Big Marc" Turner
- Luke Massy as Keith Morrison
- Nicky Holender as Ned Hastings
- Treva Etienne as Arthur Mason
- Vernon Wells as The Warden
- Marina Sirtis as Veronica Mavis
- Timothy V. Murphy as Max
- DeObia Oparei as Derrick Jackson
- Dominique Vandenberg as "Gonzo"
- Suzanne May as Michelle "Red" Miller
- Garrett Warren as Hegyes
- Matthias Hues as Football Player
- Jerry Trimble as Prisoner

== Development ==
Green Street 2 was filmed in around mid-2008 on a $1,000,000 budget, considerably lower than the film's predecessor. None of the original cast from Green Street returned except for Ross McCall, who reprised his role as Dave, and Terence Jay, who played a different character. The film was released straight-to-video in March 2009.

== Reception ==
DVD Talk said in its review: "Green Street Hooligans 2 is a sequel that nobody should have thought about", adding: "Don't corrupt your good memories of the first film by watching this rubbish".
