= Uriah Shelton =

American actor and singer (born 1997)

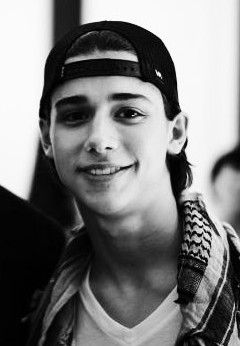
- Shelton in 2015, during filming of The Warriors Gate
- Born: March 10, 1997 (age 29); Dallas, Texas, U.S.
- Occupations: Actor, singer
- Years active: 2007–present

Uriah Shelton (born March 10, 1997) is an American actor and singer. He is known for his television roles, such as playing Jeff Cargill on The Glades, Josh on the web series Blue, and Joshua Matthews on Girl Meets World. Shelton was also the lead in the 2010 film Lifted.

== Early life ==
Shelton was born in Dallas, Texas, and has also lived in Magnolia Springs, Alabama. He took a modeling class at the age of 7, which led to the start of his acting career in television commercials. Shelton is also involved in mixed martial arts.

== Career ==
Shelton has starred in television shows, including: Without a Trace, Ghost Whisperer, Mad TV, Dirty Sexy Money, The Suite Life on Deck, Monk, Trust Me, Trauma, Hallmark's The Nanny Express, and the independent feature Alabama Moon.

Shelton starred in the lead role of Henry Matthews in the movie Lifted. Shelton wrote and sang the song "I Miss You," in the movie. He played the recurring role of Joshua Matthews on Disney Channel's Girl Meets World, the sequel series of the 1990s sitcom Boy Meets World.

Shelton also appeared in the A&E drama The Glades (2010-2013). He played Jeff Cargill, the son of a nurse played by Kiele Sanchez. In 2020, he portrayed the love interest of Kathryn Newton's lead character in the well-reviewed horror comedy film Freaky.

== Filmography ==
=== Film ===
Year	Title	Role	Notes
2008	Lower Learning	Prep School Kid	
2009	Opposite Day	Security Guard	
2010	Alabama Moon	Kit	
2011	Lifted	Henry Matthews	
2016	The Warriors Gate	Jack Bronson	
2020	Freaky	Booker Strode	
2022	Unhuman	Danny	

=== Television and web ===
Year	Title	Role	Notes
2007	Without a Trace	Brett Henbdricks	Episode: "Fight/Flight"
2007	Ghost Whisperer	Young William	Episode: "Holiday Spirit"
2008	Kamen Rider: Dragon Knight	Dakoda	Episode: "Search for the Dragon"
2008	Ring of Death	Tommy Wyatt	TV movie
2008	The Nanny Express	Ben Chandler	TV movie
2009	Little Monk	Brian	Web series, 2 episodes
2009	Monk	Nicky Phillips	Episode: "Mr. Monk Goes Camping"
2009	The Suite Life on Deck	Prince Jeffy	Episode: "Maddie on Deck"
2009	Trust Me	Jack McGuire	Episodes: "Before and After", "All Hell the Victors" and "Odd Man Out"
2009	Trauma	Rudy	Episode: "All's Fair"
2010–2013	The Glades	Jeff Cargill	Main role, 26 episodes
2011	R.L. Stine's The Haunting Hour	Pete	Episode: "My Sister the Witch"
2011	Franklin & Bash	Alex Carlisle	Episode: "Franklin vs. Bash"
2012	Last Man Standing	Ben Milbauer	Episode: "Ding Dong Ditch"
2012	Justified	Mitch	Episode: "Slaughterhouse"
2012–2015	Blue	Josh	Web series; main role, 24 episodes
2014–2017	Girl Meets World	Joshua Matthews	Recurring role, 8 episodes
2015	Instant Mom	Emmery	Episode: "Two Guys and a Gabby"
2017	13 Reasons Why	Pratters	Recurring role
2017	NCIS: Los Angeles	Finn	Episodes: "Mountebank", "All Is Bright"
2019	Looking for Alaska	Longwell	Recurring role, limited series
2025	Motorheads	Curtis	Main role
