= Green Street (film) =

2005 British-American crime drama film

Green Street Hooligans
- Theatrical release poster
- Directed by: Lexi Alexander
- Screenplay by: Lexi Alexander; Dougie Brimson; Josh Shelov
- Story by: Lexi Alexander; Dougie Brimson
- Produced by: Donald Zuckerman; Gigi Pritzker; Deborah Del Prete
- Starring: Elijah Wood; Charlie Hunnam; Claire Forlani; Marc Warren; Leo Gregory
- Cinematography: Alexander Buono
- Edited by: Paul Trejo
- Music by: Christopher Franke
- Production company: OddLot Entertainment
- Distributed by: Universal Pictures (through United International Pictures, United Kingdom); Freestyle Releasing (United States); Senator International (International)
- Release date: 9 September 2005 (United Kingdom)
- Running time: 109 minutes
- Countries: United Kingdom; United States
- Language: English
- Box office: $4.3 million

Green Street Hooligans (also known as Green Street and Hooligans) is a 2005 crime drama film about football hooliganism in the United Kingdom. The film is directed by Lexi Alexander and stars Elijah Wood, Charlie Hunnam, Claire Forlani, Marc Warren, and Leo Gregory.

Two sequels followed in the form of direct-to-video releases. The first, Green Street 2: Stand Your Ground, was released on various dates around the world between March 2009 to July 2010. The second, Green Street 3: Never Back Down, was released in the UK on 21 October 2013.

== Plot ==
Matt Buckner, an American college student studying journalism, is expelled from Harvard University after cocaine is discovered in his room. Though it belongs to his roommate Jeremy, Matt is afraid to speak up because Jeremy comes from a powerful family and is offered $10,000 for taking the blame. Matt reluctantly accepts the money and uses it to visit his sister Shannon, her husband Steve, and their son Ben in London.

There, Matt meets Steve's younger brother Pete Dunham, a school teacher and football coach who leads the local football hooligan firm – Green Street Elite (GSE). Steve asks Pete to take Matt to a football match. Though Pete is reluctant to take a "Yank" to a football match, he decides to take Matt to the game, thinking he might "learn something."

Matt meets Pete's friends and his firm in The Abbey, their local pub, and they befriend Matt, with the exception of Pete's stubborn right-hand man and assistant Bovver, who takes an immediate dislike to Matt. A few pints in, they head to the match. Afterwards, Pete, Bovver, and the other firm members go off to fight some Birmingham City fans, but Matt decides that it is not for him and heads to the train home. On his way back, Matt is attacked by three Birmingham fans, but is rescued by some GSE members. Though grossly outnumbered, the GSE manage to fight off the Birmingham firm until reinforcements chase them off. Matt does well in his first true fight, is inducted into the GSE, and moves in with Pete.

The GSE firm then head to an away game against Manchester United. Matt ends up sneaking onto the train to help when they are warned that 40 Manchester United firm members are waiting for them at the station. Bovver pulls the train's emergency stop handle and at Matt's initiative the firm persuades a van driver to take them into Manchester, posing as a moving equipment van for a film production. When past them, the GSE charge out to attack the United firm members. They win the fight and leave, taunting the United firm as they are arrested.

Jealous of Matt's rise in the ranks, Bovver talks to Tommy Hatcher, the head of GSE's rival firm, the NGO. After one of the members of the GSE sees Matt meeting his father, a journalist for The Times, for lunch, they assume Matt is a "journo" as well. Bovver informs Pete of this. Steve goes to the Abbey to warn Matt and discovers that Steve is the founder and former leader of the GSE, "The Major", who retired from football hooliganism after witnessing the death of Tommy's twelve-year-old son in a fight. Infuriated, Pete angrily confronts Matt in the pub toilets over his identity as a "journo".

Meanwhile, Bovver secretly informs Tommy and the Millwall firm of Steve's presence, who crash the Abbey and petrol-bomb the pub. Tommy confronts, fights and seriously wounds Steve by stabbing him in the neck with a broken bottle, telling him that if he dies tonight, then they are both even. Bovver, who had been knocked unconscious by Tommy's right-hand man upon arriving earlier, helps get Steve to the hospital, where Pete furiously berates Bovver for his betrayal. Shannon decides to return to the United States to ensure the safety of her family.

The two firms meet near the Millennium Dome the next day for a final violent battle. Matt and Bovver show up to fight for the GSE, but Shannon turns up with Ben and is subsequently attacked in her car by Tommy's right-hand man, only for Matt and Bovver to save her. Pete notices that Tommy is approaching the car and in order to allow Matt and Shannon to escape, distracts Tommy by goading him, saying to him that Tommy is to blame for his son's death by having failed to protect him. This eventually enrages Tommy, who angrily tackles Pete to the ground and violently beats him to death out of rage in front of both the GSE and NGO while Matt and Shannon escape. Witnessing this, the two firms stop fighting as they gather around Pete's bloodied and battered corpse in shock while Bovver, who had observed Tommy killing Pete, grieves over his dead friend.

Matt returns home to the United States and confronts the now wealthy and successful Jeremy in a restaurant, who is snorting cocaine. Jeremy admits to being the cocaine stash's owner and, as he is about to leave, Matt pulls out a tape recorder. Horrified that Matt has declared his confession as a "ticket back to Harvard", an enraged Jeremy lunges at him, but Matt fends Jeremy off with ease. Victorious, Matt walks down the street outside the restaurant, he sings "I'm Forever Blowing Bubbles", the anthem of the GSE and their associated club, West Ham United.

== Cast ==
- Elijah Wood as Matthew 'Matt' Buckner, nicknamed "The Yank": a 20-year-old American everyman, studying journalism at Harvard University. His mother has died, and his sister lives in London with her husband. He does not see his father very often, because he is away working most of the time.
- Charlie Hunnam as Peter 'Pete' Dunham: a primary school teacher of history and physical education who runs West Ham's firm the Green Street Elite, and is Steve's younger brother.
- Leo Gregory as Bovver: a member of the GSE and Pete's right-hand man.
- Claire Forlani as Shannon Dunham (née Buckner): Matt's older sister, married to Steve and mother of Ben.
- Marc Warren as Steven 'Steve' Dunham, nicknamed "The Major": a successful businessman and founder of the GSE who led the firm in 1990s before retiring, now living with his wife Shannon and son Ben.
- Ross McCall as Dave Bjorno: a commercial airline pilot and member of the GSE.
- Rafe Spall as Swill: a member of the GSE.
- Kieran Bew as Ike: a member of the GSE
- Geoff Bell as Tommy Hatcher: leader of Millwall's firm the NGO.
- James Allison and Oliver Allison as Benjamin "Ben" Dunham: son of Shannon and Steve, and Matt's nephew.
- Terence Jay as Jeremy Van Holden: a cocaine addict and dealer, son of a senator, currently studying at Harvard University.
- Joel Beckett as Terry: a retired GSE member who runs the Bridgett Abbey pub on Walsh Road, and Steve's former right-hand man.
- Henry Goodman as Carl Buckner: a world renowned journalist who is Matt and Shannon's father, Steve's father-in-law and Ben's grandfather.

== Cultural context ==
The name of the firm in the film, the Green Street Elite, refers to Green Street in the London Borough of Newham, where West Ham's old home stadium, Upton Park was located. West Ham is supported by one of Britain's notorious hooligan firms: the Inter City Firm (ICF).

== Release ==
Green Street Hooligans was released on September 9, 2005.

== Critical reception ==
On review aggregator website Rotten Tomatoes, Green Street has an approval rating of 45% based on 64 reviews, with an average of 5.5/10. The website's critics consensus reads, "When it comes to the subculture of soccer thugs, Green Street Hooligans lacks sufficient insight, and instead comes off as a Fight Club knock-off." On Metacritic, the film has a score of 55 out of 100 based on 22 reviews, indicating "mixed or average" reviews.

Roger Ebert gave the film a very favourable review, while the BBC described it as "calamitous". E! Online said while it is "full of exciting and immediate camerawork, visceral bone-crunching thrills and stout performances", it is also "saddled with a predictable storyline and such feckless dialogue that you can't help but view the whole thing as an exercise in stupidity". Lead star Hunnam's attempted Cockney accent was derided by many critics.

== Awards ==
Green Street won several awards including Best Feature at the LA Femme Film Festival, Best of the Fest at the Malibu Film Festival, and the Special Jury Award and Audience Award at the SXSW Film Festival.

The film was nominated for the William Shatner Golden Groundhog Award for Best Underground Movie. Other nominated films were Neil Gaiman's and Dave McKean's MirrorMask, the award-winning baseball documentary Up for Grabs and Opie Gets Laid.

== Sequels ==
Green Street 2: Stand Your Ground was released straight-to-DVD in March 2009. The film does not star most of the main cast of the first film but rather focuses on Ross McCall, who played Dave in the first film. The plot has Dave, who was caught at the fight at the end of the first film, in a prison where he must fight to survive.

Green Street 3: Never Back Down was released straight-to-DVD in the UK on 21 October 2013, starring Scott Adkins from The Expendables 2. Danny Harvey (Adkins) has spent all of his life fighting - in the playground, on the football pitch, and then heading up the West Ham firm the Green Street Elite (GSE). After having turned his back from violence fourteen years prior, Danny is thrust back into the GSE. Younger brother Joey, played by Billy Cook, is killed in an organised fight against a rival firm and Danny is desperate to seek revenge for his brother's death. Danny returns to the GSE and his past, the only way he knows to find out who killed his younger brother.

On 25 February 2024, Leo Gregory announced he has written a script with Dougie Brimson for a direct sequel to the original film, under the title Green Street 2.0.

== See also ==
- List of association football films
- Cass
- The Football Factory
- The Firm
- Inter City Firm
- I.D.
