= List of Prison Break episodes =

Episode list of American TV series "Prison Break"

Prison Break is an American serial drama television series that premiered on the Fox network on August 29, 2005, and finished its fifth season on May 30, 2017. The series was simulcast on Global in Canada, and broadcast in dozens of countries worldwide. Prison Break is produced by Adelstein-Parouse Productions, in association with Rat Television, Original Television and Twentieth Century Fox Television. The series revolves around two brothers: Michael Scofield (Wentworth Miller) and Lincoln Burrows (Dominic Purcell). In the first season, Lincoln is sentenced to death for a crime he did not commit, and Michael deliberately incarcerates himself to help him escape prison. Season two focuses on the manhunt of the prison escapees, season three revolves around Michael's breakout from a Panamanian jail, the fourth season unravels the criminal conspiracy that imprisoned Lincoln, and the fifth season focuses on breaking Michael out of a prison in Yemen and uncovering the conspiracy that forced Michael to fake his death and change his identity.

A total of 90 episodes of Prison Break have been aired, in addition to three special making-of episodes. The first season aired from August 29, 2005 to May 15, 2006, with a four-month break after Thanksgiving. The second season, which premiered on August 21, 2006, had a similar schedule as the first, although it had a shorter break. After an eight-week hiatus, the second season resumed on January 22, 2007 before ending on April 2, 2007. The third season began on September 17, 2007, with an eight-episode run. The show's third season went on hiatus over the 2007 Christmas period because of the 2007–2008 Writers Guild of America strike. It resumed on January 14, 2008, and the last five episodes of the season were aired. The fourth season, consisting of 22 episodes, began airing in September 2008, stopped in December 2008, and resumed on April 17, 2009. After being in development for several months, Fox announced in January 2016 that it had ordered a limited event series that would serve as a continuation to the original series. The season premiered on April 4, 2017, on Fox.

The first five seasons of Prison Break have been released on DVD and Blu-ray in Regions 1, 2, and 4. Each DVD boxed set includes all of the broadcast episodes from that season, the associated special episode, commentary from cast and crew, and profiles of various parts of Prison Break, such as Fox River State Penitentiary or the tattoo. Prison Break is also available online, including iTunes, Amazon Video, and Netflix. After the premiere of the second season of Prison Break, Fox began online streaming of the prior week's episode, though it originally restricted viewing to the United States.

== Series overview ==
Season	Episodes	Originally released	
Season	Episodes	First released	Last released
1	22	August 29, 2005	May 15, 2006
2	22	August 21, 2006	April 2, 2007
3	13	September 17, 2007	February 18, 2008
4	22	September 1, 2008	May 15, 2009
The Final Break		May 27, 2009 (Note: The television film first aired in the UK on May 27, 2009. The film was released direct-to-video on DVD and Blu-Ray in the United States on July 21, 2009.)	
5	9	April 4, 2017	May 30, 2017

== Episodes ==
=== Season 1 (2005–06) ===
No. overall	No. in season	Title	Directed by	Written by	Original release date	Prod. code	U.S. viewers (millions)
1	1	"Pilot"	Brett Ratner	Paul Scheuring	August 29, 2005	1AKJ79	10.51
2	2	"Allen"	Michael W. Watkins	Paul Scheuring	August 29, 2005	1AKJ01	10.51
3	3	"Cell Test"	Brad Turner	Michael Pavone	September 5, 2005	1AKJ02	8.49
4	4	"Cute Poison"	Matt Earl Beesley	Matt Olmstead	September 12, 2005	1AKJ03	9.15
5	5	"English, Fitz or Percy"	Randall Zisk	Zack Estrin	September 19, 2005	1AKJ04	7.96
6	6	"Riots, Drills and the Devil (Part 1)"	Robert Mandel	Nick Santora	September 26, 2005	1AKJ05	8.55
7	7	"Riots, Drills and the Devil (Part 2)"	Vern Gillum	Karyn Usher	October 3, 2005	1AKJ06	9.48
8	8	"The Old Head"	Jace Alexander	Monica Macer	October 24, 2005	1AKJ07	10.12
9	9	"Tweener"	Matt Earl Beesley	Paul Scheuring	October 31, 2005	1AKJ08	9.01
10	10	"Sleight of Hand"	Dwight H. Little	Nick Santora	November 7, 2005	1AKJ09	8.06
11	11	"And Then There Were 7"	Jesús Salvador Treviño	Zack Estrin	November 14, 2005	1AKJ10	9.58
12	12	"Odd Man Out"	Bobby Roth	Karyn Usher	November 21, 2005	1AKJ11	10.08
13	13	"End of the Tunnel"	Sanford Bookstaver	Paul Scheuring	November 28, 2005	1AKJ12	12.18
14	14	"The Rat"	Kevin Hooks	Matt Olmstead	March 20, 2006	1AKJ13	9.28
15	15	"By the Skin and the Teeth"	Fred Gerber	Nick Santora	March 27, 2006	1AKJ14	10.07
16	16	"Brother's Keeper"	Greg Yaitanes	Zack Estrin	April 3, 2006	1AKJ15	8.10
17	17	"J-Cat"	Guy Ferland	Karyn Usher	April 10, 2006	1AKJ16	8.12
18	18	"Bluff"	Jace Alexander	Nick Santora & Karyn Usher	April 17, 2006	1AKJ17	8.18
19	19	"The Key"	Sergio Mimica-Gezzan	Story by : Paul Scheuring; Teleplay by : Zack Estrin & Matt Olmstead	April 24, 2006	1AKJ18	8.63
20	20	"Tonight"	Bobby Roth	Zack Estrin	May 1, 2006	1AKJ19	8.54
21	21	"Go"	Dean White	Matt Olmstead	May 8, 2006	1AKJ20	9.13
22	22	"Flight"	Kevin Hooks	Paul Scheuring	May 15, 2006	1AKJ21	10.24

=== Season 2 (2006–07) ===
No. overall	No. in season	Title	Directed by	Written by	Original release date	Prod. code	U.S. viewers (millions)
23	1	"Manhunt"	Kevin Hooks	Paul Scheuring	August 21, 2006	2AKJ01	9.37
24	2	"Otis"	Bobby Roth	Matt Olmstead	August 28, 2006	2AKJ02	9.44
25	3	"Scan"	Bryan Spicer	Zack Estrin	September 4, 2006	2AKJ03	9.29
26	4	"First Down"	Bobby Roth	Nick Santora	September 11, 2006	2AKJ04	8.96
27	5	"Map 1213"	Peter O'Fallon	Karyn Usher	September 18, 2006	2AKJ05	9.55
28	6	"Subdivision"	Eric Laneuville	Monica Macer	September 25, 2006	2AKJ06	8.41
29	7	"Buried"	Sergio Mimica-Gezzan	Seth Hoffman	October 2, 2006	2AKJ07	8.99
30	8	"Dead Fall"	Vincent Misiano	Zack Estrin	October 23, 2006	2AKJ08	8.53
31	9	"Unearthed"	Kevin Hooks	Nick Santora	October 30, 2006	2AKJ09	8.94
32	10	"Rendezvous"	Dwight H. Little	Karyn Usher	November 6, 2006	2AKJ10	8.63
33	11	"Bolshoi Booze"	Greg Yaitanes	Monica Macer & Seth Hoffman	November 13, 2006	2AKJ11	9.21
34	12	"Disconnect"	Karen Gaviola	Nick Santora & Karyn Usher	November 20, 2006	2AKJ12	9.62
35	13	"The Killing Box"	Bobby Roth	Zack Estrin	November 27, 2006	2AKJ13	9.62
36	14	"John Doe"	Kevin Hooks	Matt Olmstead & Nick Santora	January 22, 2007	2AKJ14	9.86
37	15	"The Message"	Bobby Roth	Zack Estrin & Karyn Usher	January 29, 2007	2AKJ15	9.90
38	16	"Chicago"	Jesse Bochco	Matt Olmstead & Nick Santora	February 5, 2007	2AKJ16	10.12
39	17	"Bad Blood"	Nelson McCormick	Paul Scheuring & Karyn Usher	February 19, 2007	2AKJ17	9.55
40	18	"Wash"	Bobby Roth	Nick Santora	February 26, 2007	2AKJ18	9.42
41	19	"Sweet Caroline"	Dwight H. Little	Karyn Usher	March 5, 2007	2AKJ19	9.72
42	20	"Panama"	Vincent Misiano	Zack Estrin	March 19, 2007	2AKJ20	8.40
43	21	"Fin Del Camino"	Bobby Roth	Matt Olmstead & Seth Hoffman	March 26, 2007	2AKJ21	8.24
44	22	"Sona"	Kevin Hooks	Paul Scheuring	April 2, 2007	2AKJ22	8.12

=== Season 3 (2007–08) ===
No. overall	No. in season	Title	Directed by	Written by	Original release date	Prod. code	U.S. viewers (millions)
45	1	"Orientación"	Kevin Hooks	Paul Scheuring	September 17, 2007	3AKJ01	7.51
46	2	"Fire/Water"	Bobby Roth	Matt Olmstead	September 24, 2007	3AKJ02	7.41
47	3	"Call Waiting"	Milan Cheylov	Zack Estrin	October 1, 2007	3AKJ03	7.29
48	4	"Good Fences"	Michael Switzer	Nick Santora	October 8, 2007	3AKJ04	7.35
49	5	"Interference"	Karen Gaviola	Karyn Usher	October 22, 2007	3AKJ05	7.44
50	6	"Photo Finish"	Kevin Hooks	Seth Hoffman	November 5, 2007	3AKJ06	7.69
51	7	"Vamonos"	Vincent Misiano	Zack Estrin & Kalinda Vazquez	November 5, 2007	3AKJ07	8.00
52	8	"Bang & Burn"	Bobby Roth	Christian Trokey & Nick Santora	November 12, 2007	3AKJ08	7.18
53	9	"Boxed In"	Craig Ross, Jr.	Karyn Usher	January 14, 2008	3AKJ09	7.87
54	10	"Dirt Nap"	Michael Switzer	Matt Olmstead & Seth Hoffman	January 21, 2008	3AKJ10	7.81
55	11	"Under & Out"	Greg Yaitanes	Zack Estrin	February 4, 2008	3AKJ11	7.35
56	12	"Hell or High Water"	Kevin Hooks	Nick Santora	February 11, 2008	3AKJ12	7.84
57	13	"The Art of the Deal"	Nelson McCormick	Matt Olmstead & Seth Hoffman	February 18, 2008	3AKJ13	7.40

=== Season 4 (2008–09) ===
No. overall	No. in season	Title	Directed by	Written by	Original release date	Prod. code	U.S. viewers (millions)
58	1	"Scylla"	Kevin Hooks	Matt Olmstead	September 1, 2008	4AKJ01	6.53
59	2	"Breaking & Entering"	Bobby Roth	Zack Estrin	September 1, 2008	4AKJ02	6.53
60	3	"Shut Down"	Milan Cheylov	Nick Santora	September 8, 2008	4AKJ03	6.36
61	4	"Eagles & Angels"	Michael Switzer	Karyn Usher	September 15, 2008	4AKJ04	5.79
62	5	"Safe & Sound"	Karen Gaviola	Seth Hoffman	September 22, 2008	4AKJ05	5.84
63	6	"Blow Out"	Bryan Spicer	Kalinda Vazquez	September 29, 2008	4AKJ06	5.28
64	7	"Five the Hard Way"	Garry A. Brown	Christian Trokey	October 6, 2008	4AKJ07	5.37
65	8	"The Price"	Bobby Roth	Graham Roland	October 20, 2008	4AKJ08	5.45
66	9	"Greatness Achieved"	Jesse Bochco	Nick Santora	November 3, 2008	4AKJ09	5.23
67	10	"The Legend"	Dwight H. Little	Karyn Usher	November 10, 2008	4AKJ10	5.38
68	11	"Quiet Riot"	Kevin Hooks	Seth Hoffman	November 17, 2008	4AKJ11	5.52
69	12	"Selfless"	Michael Switzer	Kalinda Vazquez	November 24, 2008	4AKJ12	5.25
70	13	"Deal or No Deal"	Bobby Roth	Christian Trokey	December 1, 2008	4AKJ13	5.84
71	14	"Just Business"	Mark Helfrich	Graham Roland	December 8, 2008	4AKJ14	5.40
72	15	"Going Under"	Karen Gaviola	Zack Estrin	December 15, 2008	4AKJ15	5.37
73	16	"The Sunshine State"	Kevin Hooks	Matt Olmstead & Nicholas Wootton	December 22, 2008	4AKJ16	4.98
74	17	"The Mother Lode"	Jonathan Glassner	Seth Hoffman	April 17, 2009	4AKJ17	3.34
75	18	"VS."	Dwight H. Little	Christian Trokey & Kalinda Vazquez	April 24, 2009	4AKJ18	3.06
76	19	"S.O.B."	Garry A. Brown	Karyn Usher	May 1, 2009	4AKJ19	3.20
77	20	"Cowboys & Indians"	Milan Cheylov	Nick Santora	May 8, 2009	4AKJ20	2.99
78	21	"Rate of Exchange"	Bobby Roth	Zack Estrin	May 15, 2009	4AKJ21	3.32
79	22	"Killing Your Number"	Kevin Hooks	Matt Olmstead & Nicholas Wootton	May 15, 2009	4AKJ22	3.32
Prison Break: The Final Break
80	23	"The Old Ball and Chain"	Brad Turner	Story by : Christian Trokey; Teleplay by : Nick Santora & Seth Hoffman	May 27, 2009 (UK)	4AKJ23	N/A
81	24	"Free"	Kevin Hooks	Story by : Kalinda Vazquez; Teleplay by : Zack Estrin & Karyn Usher	May 27, 2009 (UK)	4AKJ24	N/A

=== Season 5 (2017) ===
No. overall	No. in season	Title	Directed by	Written by	Original release date	Prod. code	U.S. viewers (millions)
82	1	"Ogygia"	Nelson McCormick	Paul Scheuring	April 4, 2017	1AZM01	3.83
83	2	"Kaniel Outis"	Maja Vrvilo	Paul Scheuring	April 11, 2017	1AZM02	3.18
84	3	"The Liar"	Maja Vrvilo	Josh Goldin & Rachel Abramowitz	April 18, 2017	1AZM03	2.44
85	4	"The Prisoner's Dilemma"	Guy Ferland	Michael Horowitz	April 25, 2017	1AZM04	2.75
86	5	"Contingency"	Guy Ferland	Vaun Wilmott	May 2, 2017	1AZM05	2.35
87	6	"Phaecia"	Kevin Tancharoen	Michael Horowitz	May 9, 2017	1AZM06	2.37
88	7	"Wine Dark Sea"	Kevin Tancharoen	Vaun Wilmott	May 16, 2017	1AZM07	2.41
89	8	"Progeny"	Nelson McCormick	Michael Horowitz	May 23, 2017	1AZM08	1.90
90	9	"Behind the Eyes"	Nelson McCormick	Paul Scheuring	May 30, 2017	1AZM09	2.30

== Specials ==
No.	Title	Narrated by	Original release date
1	"Behind the Walls"	Mark Thompson	October 11, 2005
The first special episode recaps the first seven episodes of the first season. It also includes making-of footage, cast interviews and background information on the show and the main characters. In the United States and United Kingdom, this episode was shown after the seventh episode, "Riots, Drills and the Devil (Part 2)", while in Australia, a slightly edited version of this special aired on April 12, 2006 in between episodes 10 and 11. This episode was released on an exclusive DVD that could only be received at Target with the purchase of the Season 1 DVD in the United States.
2	"The Road to Freedom"	John Leader	January 8, 2007
Aired prior to the fourteenth episode, the second special episode previews the remaining episodes of the season. It also features interviews with cast members Wentworth Miller, Dominic Purcell, Sarah Wayne Callies, William Fichtner, Wade Williams, Paul Adelstein, Robert Knepper and Silas Weir Mitchell.
3	"Access All Areas"	Amanda Byram	September 23, 2007
The third special episode was aired only on Sky1 in the United Kingdom. Like the other two special episodes, it focuses on the beginning of its season. It includes making-of footage and interviews with the cast, and also provides additional background information on the show and the new main characters.

== Ratings ==
Prison Break : U.S. viewers per episode (millions)

Season	Episode number																					
Season	1	2	3	4	5	6	7	8	9	10	11	12	13	14	15	16	17	18	19	20	21	22
1	10.51	10.51	8.49	9.15	7.96	8.55	9.48	10.12	9.01	8.06	9.58	10.08	12.18	9.28	10.07	8.10	8.12	8.18	8.63	8.54	9.13	10.24
2	9.37	9.44	9.29	8.96	9.55	8.41	8.99	8.53	8.94	8.63	9.21	9.62	9.62	9.86	9.90	10.12	9.55	9.42	9.72	8.40	8.24	8.12
3	7.51	7.41	7.29	7.35	7.44	7.69	8.00	7.18	7.87	7.81	7.35	7.84	7.40	–								
4	6.53	6.53	6.36	5.79	5.84	5.28	5.37	5.45	5.23	5.38	5.52	5.25	5.84	5.40	5.37	4.98	3.34	3.06	3.20	2.99	3.32	3.32
5	3.83	3.18	2.44	2.75	2.35	2.37	2.41	1.90	2.30	–												

Audience measurement performed by Nielsen Media Research
