= Prison Break season 4 =

Season of television series

Prison Break
- Season 4
- DVD cover
- No. of episodes: 24

Release
- Original network: Fox
- Original release: September 1, 2008 – May 15, 2009

Season chronology
- ← Previous; Season 3 Next → Season 5

The fourth season of Prison Break, an American serial drama television series commenced airing in the United States on September 1, 2008, on Fox. It consists of 24 episodes (22 television episodes and 2 straight to DVD episodes), 16 of which aired from September to December 2008. After a hiatus, it resumed on April 17, 2009 and concluded on May 15, 2009 with a two episode finale. The fourth season was announced as the final season of Prison Break, however the series returned in a limited series format as Prison Break: Resurrection, which premiered on April 4, 2017.

== Cast ==
=== Main characters ===
- Dominic Purcell as Lincoln Burrows
- Wentworth Miller as Michael Scofield
- Michael Rapaport as DHS Special Agent Don Self
- Amaury Nolasco as Fernando Sucre
- Wade Williams as Brad Bellick
- Robert Knepper as Theodore "T-Bag" Bagwell
- Chris Vance as James Whistler
- Danay García as Sofia Lugo
- Jodi Lyn O'Keefe as Gretchen Morgan
- Sarah Wayne Callies as Sara Tancredi
- William Fichtner as Alexander Mahone

=== Recurring characters ===
- Leon Russom as General Jonathan Krantz
- Shannon Lucio as DHS Special Agent Miriam Hultz
- Stacy Haiduk as Lisa Tabak
- Cress Williams as Wyatt Mathewson
- Kathleen Quinlan as Christina Rose Scofield
- Ted King as Downey
- James Hiroyuki Liao as Roland Glenn
- Michael Bryan French as Gregory White
- Raphael Sbarge as Ralph Becker
- Ron Yuan as Feng Huan
- Barbara Eve Harris as FBI Agent Felicia Lang
- Steve Tom as Stuart Tuxhorn
- Dameon Clarke as Andrew Blauner
- Heather McComb as Rita Morgan
- Graham McTavish as Ferguson
- Jude Ciccolella as Howard Scuderi
- Shaun Duke as Griffin Oren
- Wilbur Fitzgerald as Bruce Bennett
- Michael O'Neill as DHS Director Herb Stanton
- Callie Thorne as Pam Mahone
- Paul Adelstein as Paul Kellerman
- Mark Pellegrino as Patrick Vikan
- Titus Welliver as Scott
- Ivar Brogger as Dr. Vincent Sandinsky
- Jason Davis as FBI Agent Mark Wheeler
- William Mapother as FBI Agent Chris Franco
- Reno Wilson as FBI Agent Wilson Wright
- Rockmond Dunbar as Benjamin Miles "C-Note" Franklin
- John Sanderford as Nathaniel Edison
- Crystal Mantecon as Carmelita
- Marshall Allman as L.J. Burrows
- Kim Coates as Internal Affairs Agent Richard Sullins
- Muse Watson as Charles Westmoreland

== Episodes ==
| No. overall | No. in season | Title | Directed by | Written by | Original release date | Prod. code | U.S. viewers (millions) |
|---|---|---|---|---|---|---|---|
| 58 | 1 | "Scylla" | Kevin Hooks | Matt Olmstead | September 1, 2008 | 4AKJ01 | 6.53 |
Scofield tracks Whistler, Morgan and Mahone to a party, where Whistler acquires a specific card before copying it secretly. Scofield arrives to kill Morgan for Tancredi's murder, but Morgan reveals that Tancredi is still alive. Scofield calls Lincoln, who is living a peaceful life with L.J. and Sofia in Panama. The General blames Morgan for bringing a copy instead of the original card and orders Wyatt Mathewson, his henchman, to take care of her. Scofield meets Whistler, who tells him about Scylla, the card that contains the Company's black book; but Mathewson arrives, kills Whistler and recovers the card. Lincoln kills a Company operative and is arrested. Mahone finds out that his son has been killed by Mathewson. Sucre and Bellick are revealed to have escaped Sona, which was burnt. Bagwell has also escaped and has plans to return to the U.S. to investigate Whistler's book. He is abandoned with his friend in the American deserts. Scofield reunites with Tancredi and they accept DHS agent Donald Self's offer to recover Scylla and defeat the Company in exchange for immunity, teaming up with Burrows, Mahone, Sucre and Bellick.
| 59 | 2 | "Breaking & Entering" | Bobby Roth | Zack Estrin | September 1, 2008 | 4AKJ02 | 6.53 |
The team arrives in Los Angeles; and the members are given ankle GPS devices and meet teammate Roland Glenn, a computer expert. Burrows promises revenge to Mahone after the mission is accomplished. Mahone manages to find the cardholder through his driver, whom Mahone saw at the party. Glenn states that they only need to copy the card using his special device, which can steal any electronic storage device's data in proximity. The team realizes that entering the mansion is impossible and instead put Glenn's device in a servant's handbag and have the card copied; but the servant leaves the device in the mansion and the team manages to enter and recover the device. Meanwhile, Mathewson tortures a Corrections Office worker for information and finds out that the brothers and the others aren't incarcerated; he finds Bruce Bennett and starts torturing him. Bagwell kills his friend and eats him in order to survive. He is given a ride by bikers to San Diego, mentioned in the book, where he recovers important material from a box. The team finds out that they only have one of the six cards that form the complete Scylla. Mathewson enters a room to torture someone, who turns out to be a still-alive Morgan. Scofield notices his nose bleeding.
| 60 | 3 | "Shut Down" | Milan Cheylov | Nick Santora | September 8, 2008 | 4AKJ03 | 6.36 |
The team investigates other data recovered from the mansion in order to find the other cardholders. Mahone asks FBI agent Lang to help him find his son's killer. Self's supervisor, agent Herb Stanton, convinces Senator Dallow to order the abort of the mission. The team recovers emails, which are incomplete and they infiltrate the server building and obtain the rest. Sucre and Bellick are arrested by DHS agents, Glenn stays behind and the others escape. They manage to find the meeting location and Scofield proceeds while the others are arrested too. Scofield returns with a film he recorded showing the faces of the six cardholders, one being the General himself. Self decides to let the team continue the mission. Meanwhile, Mathewson gets no information from Bennett and kills him. Bagwell begins having fun in Whistler's house and calls a company called "GATE" and is requested to go and receive his check. Mahone receives a file from Lang containing the possible shooters. The team discovers that his son is killed and Burrows finally reconciles with him.
| 61 | 4 | "Eagles & Angels" | Michael Switzer | Karyn Usher | September 15, 2008 | 4AKJ04 | 5.79 |
The team believes the Turkish consul is a cardholder, but realizes that his wife, Lisa Tabak who is also the General's daughter, is. They find her difficult to get close to before spotting Bagwell and capturing him; but they can't find the book and he escapes. The team finds out that Tabak will attend a police celebration. Scofield, Burrows and Mahone wear uniforms and successfully copy the card; but one of her bodyguards recognizes and follows Burrows and the latter kills him with Bellick's help. Meanwhile, Tancredi is informed of Bennett's death and gets depressed. She goes to a pub, where a man steals and uses her credit card, which is detected by the Company. Bagwell starts working at GATE, meeting Gregory White, the CEO, Trishanne Smith, the secretary and Blauner, another clerk. The former notices a name, Xing, in the book. In New York City, Xing is killed by his boss for his failure to get Scylla. Mahone instructs Glenn to help him find his son's killer. Mathewson arrives at the pub and starts chasing Tancredi.
| 62 | 5 | "Safe & Sound" | Karen Gaviola | Seth Hoffman | September 22, 2008 | 4AKJ05 | 5.84 |
Mahone's wife, Pam, identifies Mathewson and encourages him to kill the latter. Tancredi manages to lose the latter and the team realizes that he wants to kill them. They move for the next card while Mahone starts investigating Mathewson. Self enters the cardholder's room and fails to copy the card, but gives the specifics of the safe to the team and gets them in the building. Burrows notices Scofield's nose bleeding. They manage to copy the card while Oren, the cardholder, is meeting the General, who states that Scylla is the reason the Company has power. Meanwhile, Mahone finds the motel Mathewson was staying in and notices the acceptant calling Mathewson, and takes the number by force. Morgan manages to free herself. Sucre and Bellick search the nearby buildings for Bagwell and tell Smith that there is a prize for helping them find Bagwell; but she decides to get more from Bagwell instead. Bagwell is visited by Feng Huan, Xing's boss, who threatens to kill him if he doesn't get Scylla soon. The team deduces that the General is the head of the Company.
| 63 | 6 | "Blow Out" | Bryan Spicer | Kalinda Vazquez | September 29, 2008 | 4AKJ06 | 5.28 |
The team manages to copy the next card with an elaborate plan; but Mahone is arrested by the police while recovering Glenn's device; and Self only manages to get the device. The team is divided whether to save Mahone or move to the next card. They finally choose to rescue him in the court, where Mathewson has also arrived to kill him. Mahone is saved successfully. He calls Mathewson and promises to find him before throwing the number away, which is recovered by Glenn. Meanwhile, Gretchen reunites with her sister, Rita, and daughter, Emily, who believes Rita is her mother. Gretchen recovers a gun and some money from a gift she had given Rita previously and proceeds with plans of working for herself. The General has found out Self's investigation on him and orders a DHS double agent to search his computer and Mathewson to warn him. Blauner finds illegal background in Bagwell's faked career and the latter clears the house and attempts to escape before being attacked by Gretchen.
| 64 | 7 | "Five the Hard Way" | Garry A. Brown | Christian Trokey | October 6, 2008 | 4AKJ07 | 5.37 |
Bagwell offers Morgan to work together. Mahone advises Self to take the fight to the General instead of hiding; and Self makes the latter cancel the assault on him. The team realizes that Scuderi, the next cardholder, is currently in Las Vegas, while they are informed by Smith of Bagwell's whereabouts. Scofield, Mahone and Bellick stay to find Bagwell while the others travel to Vegas. Burrows tells Tancredi of Scofield's condition, which resembles to what killed their mother at that age. The card is successfully copied; but Glenn's indiscretion results in losing the device. Meanwhile, Scofield's team realizes that the call was a ruse by Bagwell; only Mahone manages to escape. Bagwell forces Scofield to reassemble the blueprint hidden in the papers of the book. Mahone finds the house by the GPS devices; but they are already gone as Morgan spotted the devices in time. Morgan kills Blauner as a caution. Scofield manages to complete the blueprint and leads Bagwell to an underground accessed by Bagwell's office in GATE. Mahone arrives and Bagwell is locked in a room. Scofield gets a call from Morgan, who hid herself the whole time.
| 65 | 8 | "The Price" | Bobby Roth | Graham Roland | October 20, 2008 | 4AKJ08 | 5.45 |
Morgan makes a truce with Scofield, giving him the rest of the papers. Bagwell is released. They decide to work together to bring down the Company. Burrows suggests an attack on Krantz' car and taking the last card, which is approved. Glenn is cast out of the plan because of his indiscretion that resulted in losing the device. He offers the team's whereabouts to Mathewson in exchange for money and proves his validity by giving the team's plan away, resulting in Sucre being critically shot, whose wounds Tancredi tends to. Glenn goes to meet Mathewson, who shoots and tortures him to tell the team's location. Having followed Glenn by a tracker Scofield put in his laptop, the team arrives and abducts Mathewson, everyone apart from Michael leaves Glenn to succumb to his wounds. Meanwhile, Feng tries to kill Bagwell as he promised; but Morgan convinces him to give them more time. Bagwell instructs Smith to investigate the others. Tancredi reconciles with Morgan because of the team. Deducing that the attempt was for his card not his life, Krantz decides to transfer Scylla.
| 66 | 9 | "Greatness Achieved" | Jesse Bochco | Nick Santora | November 3, 2008 | 4AKJ09 | 5.23 |
The team tortures Mathewson to make him tell Krantz that they are dead while preventing Mahone from taking his revenge until the deed is done. Tancredi is chosen to convince Mathewson; but she fails. It is revealed to be a plan to record his voice using different words and Self assembles those words, making a sentence stating the mission's accomplishment, which Self plays to Krantz on the phone; and he gets relieved and cancels the newspaper coverage he planned. Mahone tortures Mathewson until he agrees to express apology to Pam, after which he is killed. Meanwhile, White starts investigating Blauner's disappearance; but Bagwell solves the situation by manipulating the records, showing the illegal background in Blauner's career, making White to close the case in order to prevent the scandal. Morgan apparently reconciles with Krantz, revealed to have been involved with him before. She finds out about the transfer. The team finds a water pipe blocking their way and manages to get across it, but at the cost of Bellick's life.
| 67 | 10 | "The Legend" | Dwight H. Little | Karyn Usher | November 10, 2008 | 4AKJ10 | 5.38 |
The team forces Self to recover Bellick's body and send it to his mother. Sucre reveals that he would have died in the Sona riot, incited by Bagwell, if Bellick hadn't saved the former. Morgan informs the team of Krantz' plan. They realize that they can't translate the blueprint without the legend. They find an architect's name in the papers; and Mahone goes to the architect's house, where Krantz has sent his own men to recover the architect for his plan. The team finds mines in a room they reach on their way. Sucre puts his foot on a mine, which will detonate after the foot is pulled. Morgan tries to defuse it. Mahone recovers the legend and manages to defuse the mine and save Sucre. Bagwell realizes that Smith is knowing more than expected. He gets her call register and finds out that she is in contact with Self. Meanwhile, Scofield is diagnosed with hypothalamus hamartoma and Tancredi states that he will die if he doesn't have a surgery soon.
| 68 | 11 | "Quiet Riot" | Kevin Hooks | Seth Hoffman | November 17, 2008 | 4AKJ11 | 5.52 |
Scofield designates the plan for the team, as he will not join them because of his surgery. Morgan arranges a tryst with Krantz, in which she tries to steal his card; but he already knows and tries to kill her before she reminds him of their child; and he spares her and leaves. Scofield decides to join the team and finish the mission before surgery; and Tancredi goes to do her part, revealed to be involving Tabak. Morgan and Bagwell prepare to kill Scofield's team when they come back with Scylla. Smith intercepts Bagwell's call about a buyer and teams up with Self to enter the house, where Feng's men capture them. Scofield's team starts working silently because of the sound sensors. They get past the wall and make a ladder to reach the glass room while using nitrogen gas to avoid the temperature sensors. They finally enter the glass room, which contains a box. As Scofield touches it, Krantz finds out and takes a team to neutralize the threat.
| 69 | 12 | "Selfless" | Michael Switzer | Kalinda Vazquez | November 24, 2008 | 4AKJ12 | 5.25 |
The team takes Krantz hostage and uses the six cards to open the box and recover Scylla. They proceed to Krantz' room, where, he tries to allure them to surrender, reveling that he and Aldo Burrows worked closely. He finds out that Tancredi has taken Tabak hostage; and she will kill her if the team isn't allowed a safe passage outside. The team leaves the building with Scylla and Krantz orders their chase. Meanwhile, Self and Smith manage to free themselves and kill Feng and his men. At GATE, Bagwell and Morgan take the staff hostage and kill White. Smith arrives and saves them. Morgan escapes and Bagwell is captured by Smith, who reveals that she is DHS agent Miriam Hultz. The team separates, with the brothers taking the bag to an airport, where the Company operatives take it. But it is revealed that Mahone and Sucre actually have Scylla. The team gives Scylla to Self, who gives them a package containing their transfer papers and tells them to wait for the authorities. They wait for hours without anyone coming and find out that the package contains plain papers. Self kills Hultz and takes Scylla.
| 70 | 13 | "Deal or No Deal" | Bobby Roth | Christian Trokey | December 1, 2008 | 4AKJ13 | 5.84 |
Self makes Stanton believe that the team has killed him and seized Scylla. The team deduces Self's plan, to sell Scylla and disappear. They unite with Gretchen to find Self, who unites with Bagwell and they take Rita and Emily hostage, forcing Gretchen to give the team away to DHS and find a new buyer. The team is attacked by DHS agents and Burrows is captured. Burrows manages to convince Stanton and Dallow of the truth. They offer a new deal for the team to testify against Self. Scofield instructs Mahone to get Tancredi and Sucre outside the city and proceeds to the warehouse to testify with Burrows. Stanton and Dallow decide to kill the brothers to prevent the scandal. The Company mole kills Stanton and other agents before Sucre arrives and saves them, with the mole being killed. They let Dallow leave. Meanwhile, Krantz kills Scuderi for humiliating him. Bagwell stays at Rita's while Gretchen and Self meet a conduit, who reveals that a piece of Scylla is missing. Self calls Scofield and demands it, who defies him to come and get it.
| 71 | 14 | "Just Business" | Mark Helfrich | Graham Roland | December 8, 2008 | 4AKJ14 | 5.40 |
The team prepares for Self's attack. They capture Self, who convinces them to let him sell Scylla and the Company will be destroyed anyway. They let him leave, while Sucre hides in his trunk. Self and Gretchen arrive in a motel and Sucre informs the others, who arrive and attack the duo. Scofield's condition makes him collapse; and the duo escape. The Company recovers Scofield. Having put a camera in the warehouse, Self finds where Scofield has hidden the piece and obtains it before calling the conduit. Meanwhile, Bagwell is visited by a man pretending to be a bible salesman. The former finally decides to let Rita and Emily escape and is captured by the man, who is a Company man in fact. Self meets and kills the conduit in order to keep the whole money. Mahone meets FBI agents Lang and Wheeler, who can grant the team immunity in exchange for Scylla. The latter arrests the former after hearing that Scylla is gone. Tabak resigns from the Company. Burrows makes a deal with Krantz to return Scylla in exchange for Scofield's surgery.
| 72 | 15 | "Going Under" | Karen Gaviola | Zack Estrin | December 15, 2008 | 4AKJ15 | 5.37 |
Burrows tortures Bagwell and finds Self and Morgan's whereabouts. The former and Sucre arrive at the location; but they are already gone. They keep searching using the Company's surveillance technology and track the duo to a place where they are meeting the buyer's henchman, Scott. The latter takes Scylla and escapes while Self and Morgan are captured. Meanwhile, Scofield goes under surgery and meets Westmoreland in his dream, where he manages to deduce what Scylla really is. The operation is successful and Scofield reveals to Tancredi that Scylla contains next generations technologies that can end the energy crisis and provide infinite energy; and that is why Krantz believes Scylla to be the source of power. Mahone escapes the transfer car and Lang stops him; but he convinces her to let him leave. Sucre departs and Krantz forces Burrows to team up with Self, Morgan and Bagwell in order to recover Scylla. Scofield blames Burrows for his decision. Burrows reveals that their mother worked for the Company and he will continue the family business.
| 73 | 16 | "The Sunshine State" | Kevin Hooks | Matt Olmstead & Nicholas Wootton | December 22, 2008 | 4AKJ16 | 4.98 |
Burrows' team arrives in Miami, where Scott has been tracked to. Self attempts to force a vote to depose Burrows as the boss and take the position, but it is negated by Mahone's arrival. The team obtains surveillance footage which Morgan investigates and finds Scott, but she doesn't inform the team and arranges a meeting with Scott on her own. Meanwhile, Michael wakes up in a countryside mansion where a Company psychiatrist informs him that his mother, Christina Rose Scofield, is still alive and working for the Company. Michael demands to talk to her, but the psychiatrist replies that they will talk when he decides to join the Company. Tancredi meets Tabak, who gives her Michael's whereabouts. Krantz gives orders for Michael to be given a medical treatment that could kill him, but which will certainly damage his mind; however, he manages to escape with Tancredi's help. He tells Tancredi that he believes his mother is alive. Morgan takes the team to a location where they are ambushed by Scott's men. Morgan changes sides again, being shot by Scott, who is killed along with his men. Morgan is left for the police. Burrows answers the call from the buyer, who is Christina.
| 74 | 17 | "The Mother Lode" | Jonathan Glassner | Seth Hoffman | April 17, 2009 | 4AKJ17 | 3.34 |
Burrows' team members receive images of their loved ones, sent by Krantz to make them finish the mission. They possess a special key obtained from Scott. They track it and find two locations it is used. Self and Bagwell go for one that is in a church; but they are not allowed inside. Burrows and Mahone arrive in a house where they decrypt a message Christina has left for Burrows where to meet her. Burrows meets Christina in a restaurant, where she asks him to give her time to defeat Krantz, whom Oren attempts to kill as her plan. She has Oren killed for the failure, making Krantz suspect her. The other three attack the church and find guns and special keycards there. Meanwhile, Michael and Tancredi hide in a truck heading to Miami. They are attacked by a man, who is attacked and dies after stating that he doesn't work for Krantz. Michael recovers an encrypted note from him. Burrows decides to meet Christina again, what she instructed him not to. Thus she orders a sniper to shoot him.
| 75 | 18 | "VS." | Dwight H. Little | Christian Trokey & Kalinda Vazquez | April 24, 2009 | 4AKJ18 | 3.06 |
The team saves Burrows and kills the sniper. Michael and Tancredi arrive in Miami, where they meet Mahone and tell him that they will destroy the Company no matter the cost, making the two teams potential enemies. Burrows' team tracks Christina to the Indian embassy and enter it at the cost of Bagwell being beaten. Christina convinces Naveen Banarjee, a politician, to talk about Scylla in the upcoming energy conference, promising him to take care of a scientist named Sandinsky from causing trouble. Burrows' team recovers a note from the embassy. Michael and Tancredi decrypt their note and arrive at the airport Sandinsky's plane is landing. Burrows' team arrives too and abduct Sandinsky while the duo take his cell phone, realizing that he has been in contact with Christina, a claim he denies when asked by Burrows' team. Bagwell secretly informs Krantz that Christina has Scylla; and he decides to go to Miami personally. Michael calls Christina, who tries to reason with him; but he hangs up. Tancredi finds out that she is pregnant.
| 76 | 19 | "S.O.B." | Garry A. Brown | Karyn Usher | May 1, 2009 | 4AKJ19 | 3.20 |
Michael calls Christina again and she manages to track him. She arrives with her men; but this was revealed to be a ruse by Michael, who along with Tancredi abduct her and leave. Krantz arrives and blames Burrows for not telling him about Christina. He gives the team, excluding Bagwell, another chance; and they go to a house and then a bank to acquire a suitcase; but they realize that it was just taken; and they give chase. Meanwhile, Christina reveals to Michael that Burrows is not his true brother and Aldo adopted Burrows when he lost his parents, who worked for the Company. She also reveals that Burrows is falling in a trap she has set; and Michael rushes to save Burrows before locking her. She finds out about the baby before locking Tancredi and escaping. Bagwell kills Sandinsky on Krantz' order. Burrows' team tracks the man to the energy conference, where Burrows enters before Banarjee is assassinated and Burrows is framed for it. Michael arrives and teams up with him.
| 77 | 20 | "Cowboys & Indians" | Milan Cheylov | Nick Santora | May 8, 2009 | 4AKJ20 | 2.99 |
Michael and Burrows escape to one of the floors. Christina makes a deal with the Indian Prime Minister, who was also Banarjee's father, to sell him Scylla. Self tells Michael and Burrows how the police is going to capture them and kills a DHS agent who spots him. Michael finds a countermeasure and they escape the attacking unit, but are spotted by the captain, who is killed by Krantz' operative, who captures the duo. Mahone frees Tancredi and informs Michael, who is brought to Krantz with the others. Krantz punishes them by performing a lottery. Self is picked and Krantz has Self's wife killed and Self escapes, but is critically shot. Michael, Burrows and Mahone find Christina and take Scylla; but Burrows is captured. Bagwell, who overheard Michael and Mahone's conversation, captures Tancredi and brings her to Krantz, who calls Michael and demands Scylla in exchange for her. Christina calls Michael and makes the same demand in exchange for Burrows, critically shooting him to force Michael to hurry.
| 78 | 21 | "Rate of Exchange" | Bobby Roth | Zack Estrin | May 15, 2009 | 4AKJ21 | 3.32 |
While walking in the streets of Chicago, Sucre meets Benjamin Franklin, who reveals that there is a man, called Paul, who has great power and is ready to grant Michael and the others immunity in exchange for Scylla. Michael arranges a location with Christina and tries to kill her there; but the police arrive and both parties escape. Burrows tells Michael about the baby and asks him to let him die. Christina loses the deal with Banarjee because of failure to deliver Scylla. Mahone apparently betrays Michael and calls Christina, making a deal to bring Scylla in exchange for his wife, Pam, being saved from the Company. Michael arranges a transaction with Krantz, who leaves without Tancredi, intending to kill Michael after taking Scylla. Bagwell tries to rape her; but Michael arrives and rescues her. Meanwhile, the FBI interrogates Self in the hospital until Christina's assistant, posed as a doctor, arrives and injects him with toxic substance. Mahone gives a device to Christina for testing and enters the room Burrows is held. The device is revealed to be a bomb instead of Scylla; and this is all revealed to be Michael's plan to save everyone.
| 79 | 22 | "Killing Your Number" | Kevin Hooks | Matt Olmstead & Nicholas Wootton | May 15, 2009 | 4AKJ22 | 3.32 |
The bomb detonates and Mahone and Burrows escape; but Christina survives. Michael, Burrows, Mahone and Tancredi reunite and decide to destroy Scylla before Paul Kellerman, revealed to have been saved by Aldo's men during his transfer, calls and offers them freedom in exchange for Scylla. Self gets paralyzed as a result of the injection. Bagwell arranges a meeting with Sucre and is captured by him and Franklin. The duo starts torturing him to find the others. They take Burrows outside a hospital and Mahone covers for Tancredi to take the necessary tools, but is arrested by the FBI himself. The trio are captured by the Company operatives. Sucre and Franklin arrive and kill Krantz' men; Tancredi convinces Michael to spare Krantz' life and they lock him before leaving. They are attacked by Christina, whom Tancredi kills. Michael gives Scylla to Kellerman and Michael, Burrows, Tancredi, Sucre, Franklin and Mahone are given immunity. Krantz and Bagwell are arrested, with Krantz receiving the death penalty. Four years later, the team visits Michael's grave, stating his apparent death.
Prison Break: The Final Break
| 80 | 23 | "The Old Ball and Chain" | Brad Turner | Story by : Christian Trokey; Teleplay by : Nick Santora & Seth Hoffman | May 27, 2009 (UK) | 4AKJ23 | N/A |
Michael and Sara wed but happiness is short lived when Sara is arrested for the murder of Christina Scofield.
| 81 | 24 | "Free" | Kevin Hooks | Story by : Kalinda Vazquez; Teleplay by : Zack Estrin & Karyn Usher | May 27, 2009 (UK) | 4AKJ24 | N/A |
Michael, Lincoln, Sucre, and Alex reunite to break out Sara, who is ordered by the General to be killed. Michael sacrifices himself to help Sara escape. In the last scene of the series, Lincoln and Sara watch the DVD Michael left them explaining why he did what he did.

== Production ==
On January 13, 2009, Fox president Kevin Reilly confirmed the series would end at the conclusion of this season. He explained, "Prison Break got to a point where a lot of the stories had been told." At the time, he said there was a possibility of adding two extra episodes, he said "We want to finish strong." These extra two episodes became Prison Break: The Final Break, although they never aired on Fox, and became available only on DVD.

== Home media release ==
Prison Break: The Complete Fourth Season
| Set details | | Special features |
| 22 episodes; 6-disc Set; 1.78:1 aspect ratio; Subtitles: English; English (Dolby Digital 5.1 Surround) | | Audio commentaries: "Scylla" and "Breaking and Entering"; "Blow Out"; "Greatness Achieved"; "Quiet Riot"; "Just Business"; "Going Under"; "The Sunshine State"; "S.O.B."; "Cowboys and Indians"; Deleted scenes: Fade Out: The Final Episode featurette; The Plan, the Execution and the Bullet featurette; Director's World featurette |
Release dates
| United States; Canada | United Kingdom | Australia; New Zealand |
| June 2, 2009 | July 6, 2009 | July 15, 2009 |
