= Scylla (Prison Break episode) =

- Prison Break episode
- Episode no.: Season 4 Episode 1
- Directed by: Kevin Hooks
- Written by: Matt Olmstead
- Production code: 4AKJ01
- Original air date: September 1, 2008

Guest appearances
- Marshall Allman as L.J. Burrows; Wilbur Fitzgerald as Bruce Bennett; Rachel Loera as Theresa Delgado; Crystal Mantecón as Carmelita; John Rosenfeld as Jason Lief; Leon Russom as General; Callie Thorne as Pam Mahone; Steve Tom as Stuart Tuxhorn; Cress Williams as Wyatt; Nathan Castaneda as Sancho; Zachary Friedman as Cameron Mahone; Carolyn Wickwire as Edna Bellick

Episode chronology
← Previous "The Art of the Deal"	Next → "Breaking & Entering"
- Prison Break (season 4)

"Scylla" is the 58th episode of the American television series Prison Break and the first episode of its fourth season which premiered as a two-hour episode with "Breaking & Entering". It was broadcast in the United States on September 1, 2008 and on the next day on Sky One and RTÉ Two.

== Plot ==
Michael Scofield (Wentworth Miller) has tracked Gretchen Morgan (Jodi Lyn O'Keefe) and James Whistler (Chris Vance) to Los Angeles. The pair are negotiating for "Scylla", a card/disc of important Company data, and Whistler kills its current owner rather than pay for it. Before he and Gretchen can finish their operation, Michael arrives, planning to kill them as revenge for the death of Sara Tancredi (Sarah Wayne Callies). Gretchen claims that Sara is alive, but before she can say anything else, the police arrive in response to a murder committed by Whistler. Unbeknownst to Gretchen, Whistler has copied the Card, keeping the original for himself, and giving the copy to a Company representative on the way out. When the General (Leon Russom) discovers this, he orders Wyatt (Cress Williams), a Company assassin, to have Gretchen killed.

Lincoln Burrows (Dominic Purcell) is still in Panama with Sofia Lugo (Danay Garcia) and L.J. Burrows (Marshall Allman) when Michael calls him. They discuss the recent events in Sona: the prisoners rioted, burning the place down and allowing Theodore "T-Bag" Bagwell (Robert Knepper), Fernando Sucre (Amaury Nolasco) and Brad Bellick (Wade Williams) to escape. Michael also asks about how sure Lincoln is that Sara is dead. After the conversation, Michael is contacted by Alexander Mahone (William Fichtner) and Whistler, who are secretly working with Homeland Security to destroy the Company. Key to this plan is the Card, codenamed "Scylla", which contains information on all the Company's agents and operations, but can only be decoded from within an unknown facility. Whistler again hints that Sara is still alive when Wyatt arrives and attacks them, killing Whistler and retrieving the original copy of Scylla. To learn the truth, Michael travels to Chicago and contacts Sara's friend Bruce Bennett (Wilbur Fitzgerald) to find out for sure whether Sara is still alive, but gets caught by the police. Meanwhile, Lincoln, Sofia and L.J. are attacked by a Company agent. Lincoln kills the assassin in a fight, and gets arrested by the Panamanian police. Mahone returns to the home of his family only to discover that there is a police fence outside Pam's home. Fearing that something may have happened to Pam and Cameron, he quickly steps out of the car and runs towards the house, but the police officer stop him and tells him "that you don't want to go in there". Since he is still wanted in the United States, Mahone is immediately arrested as well.

Michael and Lincoln are reunited in custody by Agent Don Self (Michael Rapaport). Self is the Homeland Security agent who was working not only with Whistler, but with Aldo Burrows (Anthony Denison), in order to take down the Company. Unable to trust people within the government, Self arranges to have Michael and Lincoln be part of an unofficial, off-the-books operation to recover Scylla from the Company, with their freedom guaranteed when it's all over. The brothers refuse the offer. Bruce pays their bail, and when they're released, he reunites Michael with Sara, who has been hiding out from the Company in Chicago after being tortured by Gretchen. When Wyatt attacks the group at their supposedly secret hideout, Michael, Lincoln and Sara decide to join Self's team, believing that they can only be safe once the Company is destroyed. Also drafted into the team is Mahone, Bellick and Sucre - who were captured while trying to visit Sucre's baby girl.

In a subplot, T-Bag is making his way from Panama to the United States, looking for Michael in order to get his revenge. He tries to get to San Diego, following direction written in Whistler's bird book (which, unbeknownst to him, contains information on where to decode Scylla), but his drivers steal T-Bag's money and abandon him in the desert with their overweight companion.

== Reception ==
The premier received from the IGN readers "Last Week's Best Episode" award. IGN said though that this was because "the show didn't have a whole lot of competition this week".

=== Rating ===
The episode didn't get a good rating from multiple sources. IGN gave the double episode 6.5/10 saying that "this season [...] features the most drastic metamorphosis seen in the series".

== Production ==
This, and the following episode, were the first programs to ever be aired in a letterbox format on FOX. Prior t this, all the shows were aired in a Pan-Scan format.
