= Greatness Achieved =

- Prison Break episode
- Episode no.: Season 4 Episode 9
- Directed by: Jesse Bochco
- Written by: Nick Santora
- Production code: 4AKJ09
- Original air date: November 3, 2008

Guest appearances
- Michael Bryan French as Gregory White; Stacy Haiduk as Lisa Tabak; Shannon Lucio as Trishanne; Leon Russom as General Jonathan Krantz; Callie Thorne as Pam Mahone; Cress Williams as Wyatt; Michael Wiseman as Conor Mara

Episode chronology
| ← Previous "The Price" | Next → "The Legend" |
- Prison Break (season 4)

"Greatness Achieved" is the 66th episode of the American television series Prison Break and was broadcast on November 3, 2008 in the United States on the Fox Network. In this episode Michael, Lincoln, Sucre and Bellick tunnel into the Company's headquarters. Gretchen meets with The General. Michael's condition continues to deteriorate. The police question T-Bag regarding Andrew's disappearance. Wyatt propositions Sara while Mahone awaits his shot at his son's killer.

== Plot ==
=== At the warehouse ===
At the warehouse, Agent Self, Mahone, and Sara are deciding what to do with Wyatt. Self figures out a way to record Wyatt's voice onto a recorder and edit it to send a message to General Krantz that Lincoln and Michael are dead. The General believes the message, when Gretchen breaks into his office at this time and puts a gun on him. The General says that he wants Gretchen to work for him once again and that everything that happened was all part of his plan. Gretchen apparently complies, and hears about Scylla being moved. After the message from Wyatt goes out to the General, Self and Sara leave the warehouse so that Mahone can be alone with Wyatt. Mahone begins to torture him in revenge for the death of his son. Threatening further torture, Mahone forces Wyatt to call Pam and apologize for killing their son, realizing Wyatt now has an epiphany for the misdeed he's done. Mahone then takes Wyatt out to the harbour with a cinder block tied to his arms. Wyatt says, "You and I are the same Alex...I've done things-" but Mahone ignores him and pushes him into the water mid-sentence.

=== At GATE ===
Back at GATE Corporation, T-Bag's boss returns from his trip and discovers that T-Bag's co-worker Andrew is missing. He calls the police and a detective comes and asks T-Bag questions about Andrew and his relationship with him. After running out of options, T-Bag pulls his own falsified records and presents them to his boss as Andrew's, stating that Andrew's sales records are falsified and that it could cause a lot of trouble for the company if investigated. This makes his boss call off the investigation and T-Bag's involvement in Andrew's murder is covered up.

=== Beneath GATE ===
Michael, Lincoln, Sucre, and Bellick follow the blueprints from the bird book underneath GATE Corporation that leads them to a main water conduit. After failing to dig underneath the pipe, they decide to tunnel through it and into the Company headquarters. While Lincoln and Bellick are sabotaging the water main, Michael begins having severe health problems and Sucre is forced to cut into the water main on his own. Lincoln and Bellick return to place a pipe through the tunnel just before the water is turned back on. However, the pipe slips, and Bellick, knowing what the end result will be, decides to jump into the conduit. With Bellick hoisting the pipe from the inside of the water main, the pipe is successfully installed, but thus Bellick traps himself inside and subsequently sacrifices himself, so the team can continue.

== Reception ==
IGN gave the episode 8.8/10 saying that "Featuring several dramatic highs and two major character deaths, this episode continues the Prison Break tradition of not shying away from killing off major characters". As a result, the episode also received the IGN Editors Choice Award.
