= Five the Hard Way (Prison Break) =

- Prison Break episode
- Episode no.: Season 4 Episode 7
- Directed by: Garry A. Brown
- Written by: Christian Trokey
- Production code: 4AKJ07
- Original air date: October 6, 2008

Guest appearances
- Jude Ciccolella as Howard Scuderi; Dameon Clarke as Andrew Blauner; James Hiroyuki Liao as Roland Glenn; Shannon Lucio as Trishanne; Leon Russom as General; Cress Williams as Wyatt

Episode chronology
← Previous "Blow Out"	Next → "The Price"
- Prison Break (season 4)

"Five the Hard Way" is the 64th episode of the American television series Prison Break and was broadcast on October 6, 2008 in the United States on the Fox Network.

== Plot ==
The episode starts with T-Bag coming to his senses, tied up in a chair. Gretchen, his captor, asks T-Bag what he knows about Scylla. She proceeds to cut his good arm several times before T-Bag asks how he could be of service to her.

At the warehouse the team finds out that the next card holder is in Las Vegas, Nevada. Lincoln, Sucre, Roland, and Sara proceed to Las Vegas. The foursome tails the card holder in a casino to copy his card. Meanwhile, Sara becomes shaken when she learns from Lincoln that Michael may have a brain aneurysm and could die soon like his mother did. Roland's device fails to pick up any signal, and Lincoln deduces that the card holder is keeping his card in his room. At an outdoor swimming pool, Sara is wearing a string bikini with a transparent dress over it and is sent to hit up the card holder by faking that she was on a stagette party and her friends dared her to get a photo in a whale room. However, the card holder refuses and leaves. The bartender tells her that she "isn't his type" and that the card holder asked if he "liked to party." This leads to the team using Sucre instead, who accepts very reluctantly.

Back in Los Angeles T-Bag's assistant calls Bellick and tells the team that she wants to help and wants money. At the meeting, however, Michael, Mahone, and Bellick walk into a trap created by T-Bag. T-Bag has the girl tie up Bellick, Michael, and Mahone, but Mahone makes a run for it and calls Agent Self.

T-Bag forces Michael to help him decode Whistler's bird book by threatening the life of his assistant with a gun until Michael agrees. Gretchen, staying out of view in another room, notices Bellick has an ankle monitor and tells T-Bag they have to get them off. Michael arranges the pages from the book into a blueprint of the GATE office but secretly hides a page under the table.

In Las Vegas Sucre is seen walking to the pool deck, removing his shirt, and sitting down with a beer beside the card holder. Sucre is invited by the card holder to his room for a better drink. Once inside the room, Sucre secretly copies the fifth card while discovering that Scuderi's aim was to find a one-time bedmate for his wife and not for himself; this due to impotency caused by a Vietnam War wound in Hue City. Sucre then returns after a long time to the hotel room and tells them that the download was successful. Roland is then asking what happened, and Sucre answers, "It stays in Vegas," while Sucre gives Roland the device.

Mahone, with a GPS and a gun, breaks into the house where Michael and Bellick are supposedly held but only finds the ankle monitors. Mahone notices a paper crane, which is a page with the word GATE. Meanwhile, T-Bag, Gretchen, and their captives arrive at a new hiding spot, where Gretchen lures a GATE employee and kills him for snooping around. At GATE T-Bag takes Michael to the 8 x 10 closet in his old office, where he uses a screwdriver to remove the carpet and the floor tiles, revealing a metal trap door.

As Lincoln and his team are leaving the casino, Roland trails behind and uses the slot machines while holding the device, which allows him to hit jackpot many times. Unfortunately, this is noticed by the casino employees. The casino security confiscates the device (despite Roland telling him it's a battery pack) and kicks him out, much to the team's annoyance. Roland does say that he can make another device in a month.

After opening the trap door, Michael and T-Bag descend a ladder and arrive at a small underground hallway. Michael states that he is no longer helping T-Bag when Mahone jumps out and knocks out T-Bag. Mahone and Michael then throw T-Bag into a cell and leave him there yelling. Walking out from GATE, Mahone, Self, and Michael hear a cell phone nearby. Michael answers the call and realizes that it is Gretchen, still alive and involved.

== Reception ==
IGN gave the episode 9.2 saying that the episode "is a fine example of what can be done with this new series format". IGN also gave the episode the Editor's choice award.
