= The Legend (Prison Break) =

- Prison Break episode
- Episode no.: Season 4 Episode 10
- Directed by: Dwight H. Little
- Written by: Karyn Usher
- Production code: 4AKJ10
- Original air date: November 10, 2008

Guest appearances
- Jude Ciccolella as Howard Scuderi; Michael Bryan French as Gregory White; Stacy Haiduk as Lisa Tabak; Jennifer Hetrick as Elaine Baker; Shannon Lucio as Trishanne; Leon Russom as General Jonathan Krantz; Scott Alan Smith as Neurologist; Keith Szarabajka as David Baker

Episode chronology
← Previous "Greatness Achieved"	Next → "Quiet Riot"
- Prison Break (season 4)

"The Legend" is the 67th episode of the American television series Prison Break and was broadcast on November 10, 2008 in the United States on the Fox Network.

== Plot ==
The team members are angered when they find out that Agent Self is refusing to return Bellick's body to his mother. Sucre attacks him and Mahone threatens to call off the operation to uncover Scylla if Self goes back on his word. Self reluctantly agrees but warns Sucre to never attack him again or risk death. Michael and Self meet with Gretchen, who gives them the remaining pages from the bird book and lets them know that Scylla is being moved to a bunker in Pennsylvania the following day. Contrary to Lisa's wishes, the General wants to call in someone named David Baker to assist with moving Scylla. Michael and Mahone uncover a code and figure out that David Baker is the one who wrote the code and the blueprints in Whistler's bird book; to fully decipher it, they're going to need David Baker.

At GATE, Trishanne gives T-Bag Gretchen's fingerprints and background info from the California Highway Patrol. When she mentions Whistler's name to him, he immediately becomes suspicious of her, wondering how she could possibly know who he is. However, T-Bag runs into a bigger problem when he is asked by his boss to step in on a major presentation. Later that day, it turns out that Trishanne works with Homeland Security; she turns up to tell Self that she screwed up when she mentioned Whistler in front of T-Bag.

At the warehouse, Michael collapses again, forcing Sara to rush him to the hospital under fake identities. Michael is brought in for a CT scan as Sara patiently waits outside. In Michael's absence, Mahone heads to David Baker's house and is let in after he mentions Scylla. In the GATE basement, Lincoln and Sucre are looking for a way into the Company headquarters when Sucre accidentally steps on a trigger, possibly a land mine, which starts beeping. If he moves, it may go off and harm them both. At David Baker's house, after enquiring about Baker's model of a self-sufficient city comparable to the real-world Venus Project, Mahone is probed on his involvement with the Company, thereby betraying his purpose at the house while Baker insists that he has cut all ties to the Company. Back at GATE, T-Bag begins to deliver a much-practiced speech in front of potential clients, before breaking into a passionate, half-true speech about how he volunteered in prison and was friends with a CO named Brad, in honour of Bellick's memory.

The hospital is looking to admit Michael but he refuses treatment. Sara asks Michael to reconsider, but both are spooked when they spot the police in the hospital and hurriedly leave, asking the doctor to call back with the test results later. Meanwhile, agents from The Company barge into David Baker's house as Mahone is begging Baker for help. Mahone tries to take a call from Lincoln before hanging up as he spots the Company agents approaching; he hurriedly tries to bring Baker around then runs before Baker is captured and backup agents sweep the grounds for signs of an intruder. While fleeing, Mahone is met with Baker's wife, who delivers a legend for the blueprint and drives off.

Unable to reach Michael or Mahone, Lincoln drags Gretchen into the tunnels. Gretchen recognizes the type of land mine and orders Sucre to change the distribution of his weight on the trigger, so that she can disarm the firing pin. Lincoln and Sucre are distrustful of her, but she points out that she is risking her own life as well. After meeting up back at the warehouse, Michael and Mahone decode the blueprint, only to realize that Sucre isn't just stepping on a land mine, but also on an alarm trigger. Mahone rushes to GATE to stop them from dismantling the bomb, which will set off the alarm. He manually overrides the system and tells Sucre to step off the trigger, who eventually does so with great reluctance.

Everyone meets back up at the warehouse where they are met with Bellick's body, dressed in a proper suit, and placed in a coffin to be sent home to his mother for burial. Mahone places a police shield on Bellick's chest. Sucre makes the phone call to Bellick's mother, as he promised that he would in the event that anything happened to him. T-Bag discovers Trishanne's identity when he calls a number on Trishanne's resume and is greeted by Self's voice on the other end of the line.

Sara gives Michael his medical results: he has a Hypothalamus Tumor that has been growing and requires surgery. Michael asks for two days, but Sara tells him that he only has one – he has to have surgery tomorrow or he runs the risk of dying.

== Production ==
In the T-Bag speech scene, Prison Break writers Nick Santora, Matt Olmstead, Zack Estrin, Karyn Usher, Seth Hoffman and others appear, presumably in a tribute to Bellick's character.

== Reception ==
IGN gave the episode 8.8/10 saying that "the writers chose the right material to include in the episode" and that there were "great character moments in-between the action". As a result, the episode also received the IGN Editors Choice Award.
