= Safe & Sound (Prison Break) =

- Prison Break episode
- Episode no.: Season 4 Episode 5
- Directed by: Karen Gaviola
- Written by: Seth Hoffman
- Production code: 4AKJ05
- Original air date: September 22, 2008

Guest appearances
- Dameon Clarke as Andrew Blauner; Shaun Duke as Griffin Oren; James Hiroyuki Liao as Roland Glenn; Shannon Lucio as Trishanne; Leon Russom as General; Callie Thorne as Pam Mahone; Cress Williams as Wyatt; Ron Yuan as Feng Huan

Episode chronology
← Previous "Eagles & Angels"	Next → "Blow Out"
- Prison Break (season 4)

"Safe & Sound" is the 62nd episode of the American television series Prison Break and was broadcast on September 22, 2008, in the United States on the Fox Network.

== Plot ==
With the Scylla cards copied from Tuxhorn and Tabak, four cardholders remain. Although the resolution on the video taken with Scofield's camera phone is unclear, the FBI agent Donald Self recognizes one of the cardholders. Michael has Agent Self run high-resolution identity searches on the three unknown cardholders, while attempting to copy the next card. At the same time, he orders Sucre and Bellick to canvas Los Angeles for T-Bag, who is somewhere in the city with Whistler's bird book that contains the plan to break into the Company headquarters.

Meanwhile, Sara Tancredi, upon discovering she has lost Bruce Bennett's credit card, realizes she is being followed. She makes a run for it and manages to elude Wyatt, the Company's assassin.

Agent Self, by making up a story about Al-Qaeda using stolen bearer bonds, manages to barge into the cardholder's office in the Treasury Department. Unfortunately, he discovers that the card is inside the holder's office wall safe, which blocks the copying device and prevents the card from being copied.

After losing Sara, Wyatt visits the imprisoned Gretchen Morgan, whom despite repeated torture and a starvation diet has managed to resist. Wyatt proceeds to slowly suffocate and nauseate Gretchen by putting a tape over her mouth and leaving a bucket of urine and body parts in the room. Later, Gretchen kills her guard by stabbing him in the temple with a screw removed from the chair she was tied to and escapes.

Mahone obtains a picture of Wyatt, who killed his son. He meets with his estranged wife, Pam, who recognizes the photo of Wyatt among others. She makes him promise to hunt down and kill their son's murderer, and gives him a gun.

Sucre and Bellick arrive at GATE, and ask for T-Bag who is masquerading there as Cole Pfeiffer, Whistler's fabricated persona. The receptionist, intending to blackmail T-Bag, lies to the duo. After they leave, T-Bag agrees to pay the receptionist three percent of his commissions.

Scofield has come up with a plan to break into one of the most protected buildings in the world and copy the card. The occupant of the room adjacent to the card holder's is led out of the building by Agent Self, who has arranged a lunch meeting. Sucre and Bellick, disguised as janitors, performs vacuum cleaning outside the room, effectively blocking entry and covering any noise from the room. Scofield and Lincoln break into the room via air vents and drill through both the wall and the back of the safe in the next room. During the break-in, Lincoln discovers Scofield's nosebleed. Scofield brushes it off and asks Lincoln not to tell Sara, but Lincoln seems worried. The two successfully drill through the wall into the safe, when the "General" unexpectedly shows up in the card holder's room. Paranoid after recent events, he demands to see the card, but Michael manages to copy and replace the card and gets the wall back up just before the safe is opened.

Mahone has managed to find the motel where Wyatt is staying. Wyatt, already anticipating this since Sara escaped him, has hired the motel clerk to mislead any would-be followers and alert him immediately. The clerk, as per his orders, lies to Mahone that Wyatt has already checked out. When he calls Wyatt, however, Mahone suddenly appears behind him with a gun. Terrified, the clerk tells Wyatt that nobody has appeared. Mahone then takes Wyatt's number from the clerk.

The high-resolution identity scans have returned. Two of the three cardholders are identified, along with their locations, but the third, the General himself, is a complete ghost — no records of his identity, past, or location exists in the database. Sara, however, recalls hearing Gretchen reporting to a 'General' when she was in Gretchen's captivity. Meanwhile, the General and Wyatt discuss what to do about the escaped Gretchen, when a Company agent alerts them that someone called Agent Self has attempted to identify the general from the database.

== Reception ==
IGN gave the episode 8.8/10 saying that the episode is "Filled with some fantastic dramatic tension" and that through this episode the season is "finally moving forward with some much required plot advances" which point the show in the right direction.
