= The Price (Prison Break) =

- Prison Break episode
- Episode no.: Season 4 Episode 8
- Directed by: Bobby Roth
- Written by: Graham Roland
- Production code: 4AKJ08
- Original air date: October 20, 2008

Guest appearances
- Julie Berzon as Michelle Taylor; Shaun Duke as Griffin Oren; Stacy Haiduk as Lisa Tabak; James Hiroyuki Liao as Roland Glenn; Shannon Lucio as Trishanne; Karl Makinen as Derek Sweeney; Leon Russom as General Jonathan Krantz; John Sanderford as Nathaniel Edison; Steve Tom as Stuart Tuxhorn; Cress Williams as Wyatt; Ron Yuan as Feng Huan

Episode chronology
← Previous "Five the Hard Way"	Next → "Greatness Achieved"
- Prison Break (season 4)

"The Price" is the 65th episode of the American television series Prison Break and was broadcast on October 20, 2008 in the United States on the Fox Network.

== Plot ==
Michael and Agent Self strike a deal with Gretchen Morgan, who wants Scylla for herself but holds the pages of the 'bird book' that Michael needs. Sara is reluctant about this, as she is constantly disturbed by memories of imprisonment and torture at the hands of Gretchen. Meanwhile, now without the copying device, the team targets General Krantz to obtain the sixth and final card key. Recalling a successful job from his criminal days, Lincoln devises a plan to ram the General's limousine with a car and take his card. Lincoln and Sucre are to drive the car, Michael, Sara, and Bellick are to arrive at the crash scene in an ambulance, disguised as paramedics, and Mahone is to follow in an SUV to pick up Link & Sucre after the crash. An old car is obtained, and the ambulance is stolen from an impound while Self creates a diversion.

Roland faces an increasingly hostile attitude toward him from the team after he lost the device. He contacts Wyatt by text message on his phone, offering Michael and Lincoln for cash. When demanded for proof, Roland informs Wyatt of the impending ambush on the General.

Gretchen, T-Bag, and the receptionist plan to start digging for the decoding device of Scylla. They pretend to work at GATE as usual, when Mr. Feng arrives demanding Scylla from T-Bag. However, Gretchen steps in, reassuring him to deliver Scylla for $125 million, and sends him off. After he leaves, T-Bag and the receptionist are seen secretly copying Gretchen's fingerprints.

Having set up an ambush, the team waits. Mahone is gloomy as the pursuit after his son's murderer is all but abandoned by the team; Sucre refuses to leave when Lincoln suggests doing it by himself; Sara confronts Michael of his possible condition, but Michael insists he is fine. The plan fails when the General's limousine is alerted at the last second. Wyatt arrives and shoots at Lincoln and Sucre in their car; the pair escapes, but Sucre is shot in his side. Back at the warehouse, Sara performs an emergency surgery on Sucre, who survives. Michael is suspicious about Roland, but is seemingly convinced by Roland's denial. Roland later flees the warehouse.

Gretchen sets up a meeting with Sara and gives her an opportunity to settle the score; she offers to let Sara whip her on the back with an extension cord. Sara refuses, but puts a blade to her throat, cutting it lightly, and tells Gretchen that she will pay for killing a guard ('Michelle') who helped Sara escape.

After the failed ambush, the General realizes Michael and his team are after his card, not his life. In a meeting with all the card holders, the General orders to have Scylla moved immediately, putting the post-Laos plan of the Company on hold.

Instead of getting paid, Roland gets shot by Wyatt in both his knees. Roland reveals the location of the warehouse to save himself, but Wyatt still shoots him in the stomach. Wyatt is savagely beaten by Mahone, immediately knocked out, relieved of both his weapons and communication devices, and taken captive by Michael, Lincoln, Bellick, and Mahone, who followed a bug planted in Roland's laptop. Michael stays with Roland and holds his hand until Roland dies.

== Reception ==
IGN gave the episode 8.6/10 saying that "this episode featured some key developments that really pushed the storyline forward".
