= Michael Wiseman =

American television and film actor

Michael Wiseman is an American television and film actor. He is best known for his portrayal of Johnny Rizzo in the 2012 CBS series Vegas.

== Early life and career ==
Wiseman grew up in Lafayette, California. He knew as a boy that he wanted to be an actor; the caption of his eighth grade yearbook picture said, "Career Goal: football player or famous actor". He graduated from Saint Mary's College High School in Berkeley, California, in 1985.

Wiseman spent two decades working in Hollywood before landing the part of Rizzo, during which he played an outspoken student in the PBS series French in Action, performed supporting roles in Tim Burton's remake of Planet of the Apes and Surviving Gilligan's Island. He has acted in over 65 television series, including Cheers, ER, Melrose Place, NYPD Blue, NCIS and The X-Files.

== Personal life ==
Wiseman is married to Caroline Keenan-Wiseman, an Emmy-nominated hairstylist and makeup artist. The couple have two daughters. In 2011, Wiseman and his family moved back to his childhood city of Lafayette, California.

== Filmography ==
Key
†	Denotes works that have not yet been released

=== Film ===
Year	Title	Role	Notes	Ref.
1990	Caged Fury	Policeman #2	Film debut	
1990	Predator 2	Officer Zinck		
1993	Judgment Night	Travis	Adam Carolla was hired as a stand-in	
1994	The Stöned Age	Crump's Brother		
1995	Black Scorpion	Hacksaw		
1995	Excessive Force II: Force on Force	Bobby Tucci		
1995	Huntress: Spirit of the Night	Jacob	Co-produced with Romania; also known as The Beast Inside Her	
1996	The War at Home	Lieutenant		
1996	Crossworlds	Cop #2		
1998	Charades		Directed by Richmond Riedel	
2001	My Bonneville		Directed by Robert F. Lyons	
2001	Planet of the Apes	Specialist Hansen		
2001	Surviving Gilligan's Island: The Incredibly True Story of the Longest Three Hour Tour in History	Russell Johnson		
2004	Rancid	Det. Kent	English-language Swedish film	
2006	The Wicker Man	Officer Pete		
2006	Hiding Victoria	Lenny		
2010	Murder in Fashion	Agent Johnson	Also known as Fashion Victim	
2014	Atlas Shrugged Part III: Who Is John Galt?	Bartender		
2016	Retreat!	Lt. Fuller		
2017	Running Wild	Doug Ciocca		
2017	In Search of Fellini	Clive Montgomery		
2017	Pray for Rain	Ron Skinner		
2022	Holiday Harmony	Abe Crawford		

=== Television ===
Year	Title	Role	Notes	Ref(s)
1987	French in Action	Obnoxious Student	Episode: "Leçon 3: Planning and Anticipating II"	
1992	Cheers	Teammate #2	Episode: "Take Me Out of the Ball Game"	
1992	Tales from the Crypt	Rudy	Episode: "Beauty Rest"	
1992	Melrose Place	Duane	Episode: "House of God"	
1994	Renegade	Sam Ravallo	Episode: "Rabbit Redux"	
1994	Hot Line	Daryl Bradford	Episode: "The Homecoming"	
1996	Walker, Texas Ranger	Paul Croton	2 episodes: "El Coyote: Part 1" and "El Coyote: Part 2"	
1997	Perversions of Science	Barman	Episode: "Planely Possible"	
1997	Even Odds	Ron	Unsold TV pilot for MTV	
1998	Mike Hammer, Private Eye	Gareth McAllister	Episode: "The Cutting Edge"	
1998	Mowgli: The New Adventures of the Jungle Book	Travis	Episode: "What Goes Around..."	
1998	NYPD Blue	Tommy Richardson	3 episodes: "Don't Kill the Messenger," "The One That Got Away" and "I Don't Wanna Dye"	
1998	Diagnosis: Murder	Russell Westbrook	Episode: "Wrong Number"	
1998	Nash Bridges	David Pembrook	Episode: "Apocalypse Nash"	
1998	Martial Law	Andre Pitman	Episode: "How Sammo Got His Groove Back"	
1999	Profiler	Det. Mario Montagno	2 episodes: "Heads, You Lose" and "What's Love Got to Do with It?"	
2000	The Pretender	Mr. Cain	Episode: "Meltdown"	
2000	JAG	Jack Riggins	Episode: "Overdue & Presumed Lost"	
2000	Star Trek: Voyager	Beta-Hirogen	2 episodes: "Flesh and Blood: Part 1" and "Flesh and Blood: Part 2"	
2001	The Test	Self (panelist)	Episode: "The Debt Test"	
2001	ER	Danny	Episode: "Start All Over Again"	
2001	Philly	Ray Cook	Episode: "Truth or Consequence"	
2001	The X-Files	Dr. Rocky Bronzino	Episode: "Lord of the Flies"	
2002	Judging Amy	Mr. Weston	Episode: "People of the Lie"	
2003	Boomtown	Greg Wisnicki	Episode: "The Love of Money"	
2005–07	Boston Legal	D.A. Bret Haber	2 episodes: "Schmidt Happens" and "Hope and Gory"	
2005	CSI: Miami	Connor Meade	Episode: "Game Over"	
2005	Fat Actress	Stephen Wilcox	Episode: "Holy Lesbo Batman"	
2005	Blind Justice	Dean Bostic	Episode: "Dance with Me"	
2005	E-Ring	Commander	2 episodes: "Pilot" and "Snatch and Grab"	
2006	CSI: Crime Scene Investigation	Director of Surveillance	Episode: "Bang-Bang"	
2006	Cold Case	Charles Kozlowski	Episode: "The War at Home"	
2007	Lincoln Heights		Episode: "Betrayal"	
2007	State of Mind	Teddy Rivers	Episode: "Snow Melts"	
2007	The Closer	Jonathan Schafer	2 episodes: "'Til Death Do Us Part: Part I" and "'Til Death Do Us Part: Part II"	
2007	Chuck	Lon Kirk	Episode: "Chuck Versus the Crown Vic"	
2007	Nip/Tuck	Police Officer	Episode: "Dr. Joshua Lee"	
2008	Prison Break	Det. Conor Mara	Episode: "Greatness Achieved"	
2009	Without a Trace	Gabriel Macklin	Episode: "Wanted"	
2009	The Mentalist	Dreyer Whelan	Episode: "Red Badge"	
2010	Lie to Me	Prosecutor Crosby	Episode: "The Whole Truth"	
2010	Saving Grace	Rocky Porter	Episode: "I'm Gonna Need a Big Night Light"	
2012–13	Vegas	Johnny Rizzo	10 episodes: "Money Plays," "All That Glitters," "(Il) Legitimate," "Bad Seeds," "Exposure," "Estinto," "Palutes," "From This Day Forward," "Road Trip" and "The Third Man"	
2013	NCIS	Chet Tyber	Episode: "Seek"	
2015	Scorpion	Fire Chief	Episode: "Postcards from the Edge"	
2024	Scarlett †	Brooks	Post-production	

=== Theater ===
Year	Title	Role	Notes	Ref(s)
Unknown	True West		Third Stage Theatre	
Unknown	Hurlyburly		Chamber Theatre	
1987	Grease		Garvin Theatre	
1991	Savage in Limbo	Murk	Tamarind Theatre	
1992	Maps for Drowners		Tiffany Theater	
1998	Crooks	Bill	Tiffany Theater	

=== Video games ===
Year	Title	Role	Notes	Ref(s)
2002	Medal of Honor: Rising Sun	Guide	Voice; narration	
