= Selfless =

Selfless may refer to:

- Selflessness, the act of sacrificing one's own interest for the greater good
  - Selfless service
- Selfless (album), a 1994 album by English industrial metal band Godflesh
- Self/less, a 2015 film starring Ryan Reynolds
- "Selfless" (Buffy the Vampire Slayer), a 2002 episode of Buffy the Vampire Slayer
- "Selfless" (Prison Break), a 2008 Prison Break episode
- Selfless Gaming, esports team
- Selfless, a song from the 2020 album The New Abnormal.
