= Blow Out (Prison Break) =

- Prison Break episode
- Episode no.: Season 4 Episode 6
- Directed by: Bryan Spicer
- Written by: Kalinda Vazquez
- Production code: 4AKJ06
- Original air date: September 29, 2008

Guest appearances
- Dameon Clarke as Andrew Blauner; James Hiroyuki Liao as Roland Glenn; Regan Licciardello as Emily Morgan; Shannon Lucio as Trishanne; Heather McComb as Rita Morgan; Brian Poth as Brian Anderson; Geoffrey Rivas as Srgt. Salinas; Leon Russom as General; John Sanderford as Nathaniel Edison; Cress Williams as Wyatt

Episode chronology
← Previous "Safe and Sound"	Next → "Five the Hard Way"
- Prison Break (season 4)

"Blow Out" is the 63rd episode of the American television series Prison Break and was broadcast on September 29, 2008 in the United States on the Fox Network.

== Plot ==
Michael Scofield, Brad Bellick, Lincoln Burrows, Alex Mahone, Fernando Sucre and Sara Tancredi are at the horse track where they are to find their next card holder. Although they successfully manage to copy the card's contents on to Roland's device, Alex, who has the device with him, is arrested after punching a cop and trying to flee the scene. At the police station, Mahone is locked up and his possessions, including the device, are stored away. The gang informs Donald Self of the news and ask him to free Mahone. Don tries to use his federal badge to wriggle out of the mess, but only manages to strike a deal to get Mahone's possessions. Mahone reluctantly agrees and signs the papers so Don can do so.

Later, Don is confronted by Wyatt, who warns him that the Pad Man likes his privacy and tells Self to stay out of company business. Self stands his ground and walks off.

As Mahone is scheduled to go to court, he realizes that Wyatt intends to be at the hearing to kill him. He informs Michael, who convinces everyone to help rescue him instead of focusing on the next card holder. Sara, posing as Mahone's representative, manages to take his file and fingerprints to hide the evidence. Lincoln and Michael blow the power to the building, and in the confusion, Sucre helps Mahone escape. Wyatt notices the gang leaving, but is unable to shoot them due to the police around the area. Mahone thanks the gang at the warehouse for saving him and then makes a surreptitious call to Wyatt telling him that it is personal. Mahone throws Wyatt's number away, but Roland manages to dig it out of the trash.

Back at Gate Corporation, T-Bag uses the clues in Whistler's book to deduce there is something hidden in a supply closet connected to his office. Before he can investigate further, however, he is revealed to be a fraud and flees back to his suite. Meanwhile, Gretchen, having escaped confinement by Wyatt, hides out at her sister's house to wash up. She stays briefly before heading off to find Whistler, but it is also revealed she has a daughter. Gretchen then heads to the coroner's office to gather Whistler's file; although she claims to be his wife, Gretchen is forced to knock out the guard to claim Whistler's records and belongings. This leads her to the suite where T-Bag is staying. As T-Bag is frantically wiping down surfaces to hide his fingerprints, Gretchen arrives and knocks him to ground, demanding to know who he is.

== Reception ==
IGN gave the episode 6.4 saying that the only way to enjoy the episode is if you turn off "your brain and accept all of the ridiculous plot twists and character decisions at face value".
