= Philly (TV series) =

- Genre: Legal drama
- Created by: Steven Bochco; Alison Cross
- Starring: Kim Delaney; Tom Everett Scott; Rick Hoffman; Robert Harper; Dena Dietrich; Kyle Secor; James Denton
- Opening theme: "Philly Theme" by Mike Post
- Composer: Mike Post
- Country of origin: United States
- Original language: English
- No. of seasons: 1
- No. of episodes: 22

Production
- Executive producers: Steven Bochco; Kevin Hooks; Rick Wallace; Kim Delaney
- Producers: Bernadette Caulfield; Dayna Kalins; Jonathan R. Hiatt
- Running time: 50 minutes
- Production companies: Steven Bochco Productions; Paramount Network Television

Original release
- Network: ABC
- Release: September 25, 2001 – May 28, 2002

Philly is an American legal drama television series created by Steven Bochco and Alison Cross, which starred Kim Delaney as defense attorney Kathleen Maguire. The series aired on ABC from September 25, 2001 to May 28, 2002, broadcasting 22 episodes before it was canceled due to low ratings.

== Overview ==
Kathleen Maguire is a single mother and partner in a small Philadelphia law firm with Will Froman (Tom Everett Scott). She fights to get her clients out of trouble and deals with professional conflicts arising from her relationship with her ex-husband Dan Cavanaugh (Kyle Secor), the Deputy for Trials. She also starts to date Judge Augustus "Jack" Ripley (James Denton).

== Cast ==
- Kim Delaney as Kathleen Maguire, a frank, driven attorney and single mother forced to take on her firm after only a year of practice after her partner has a mental breakdown in court.
- Tom Everett Scott as Will Froman, Kathleen's womanizing law partner
- Rick Hoffman as Terry Loomis, an ADA whom Kathleen regularly goes up against, and whom she has formed a frenemy relationship with.
- Diana-Maria Riva as Trish, Kathleen's secretary
- Scotty Leavenworth as Patrick Cavanaugh, Kathleen's young son.
- Kyle Secor as Daniel Cavanaugh, Kathleen's ex-husband, a deputy who is bitter about her leaving him.

=== Recurring ===
- Robert Harper as Judge Irwin Hawes, a slimy, abrasive judge who has frequent run-ins with Kathleen.
- Dena Dietrich as Judge Ellen Armstrong
- James Denton as Judge Augustus "Jack" Ripley, a judge who Kathleen becomes romantically involved with.
- Kristanna Loken as Lisa Walensky, an ADA who has an on-again, off-again relationship with Will.
- Veronica Hamel as Judge Marjorie Brennan, the mistress of Will's father, whom Will himself gets involved with.
- Monique Edwards as ADA Teena Davis
- Anne Gee Byrd as Annie Maguire

=== Notable guest stars ===
- Joanna Cassidy as Marian Marshall, Kathleen's law partner, who she is forced to take over for after a mental breakdown in the middle of a trial.
- Pauley Perrette as Angela
- Dean Norris as Detective Duffy
- James Avery as Dean Mark Clivner
- Sharon Lawrence as Tabitha Davenport, a madam whose client list includes Judge Hawes. Lawrence had previously co-starred with Delaney on NYPD Blue.
- Zachery Ty Bryan as Brian Lee
- Judd Hirsch as Rabbi Nathan Wexler
- Red Buttons as Murray Klopman

== Episodes ==
No.	Title	Directed by	Written by	Original release date	Prod. code
1	"Philly" "Prototype"	Kevin Hooks	Story by : Steven Bochco & Alison Cross; Teleplay by : Alison Cross	September 25, 2001	D101
2	"Porn Again"	Rick Wallace	Story by : Steven Bochco & Alison Cross; Teleplay by : Alison Cross	October 2, 2001	D102
3	"Light My Fire" "Light My Fair"	Peter Werner	Jonathan R. Hiatt	October 9, 2001	D103
4	"Tempus Fugitive"	Rick Wallace	Tom Szentgyörgyi	October 16, 2001	D105
5	"Philly Folly"	Kevin Hooks	Alison Cross	October 23, 2001	D104
6	"Blown Away"	Jeannot Szwarc	Keith Eisner	November 13, 2001	D106
7	"Prisoner of Love"	Kevin Hooks	Story by : Steven Bochco & Alison Cross; Teleplay by : Alison Cross	November 20, 2001	D107
8	"Truth or Consequence"	Greg Beeman	Story by : Steven Bochco & Alison Cross & Tom Szentgyörgyi; Teleplay by : Tom Szentgyörgyi	November 27, 2001	D108
9	"Loving Sons"	Mark Tinker	Story by : Steven Bochco & Alison Cross & Jonathan R. Hiatt; Teleplay by : Jonathan R. Hiatt	December 4, 2001	D109
10	"Fork You Very Much"	Michael M. Robin	Story by : Steven Bochco & Alison Cross & Keith Eisner; Teleplay by : Keith Eisner	December 11, 2001	D110
11	"Live and Leg Die"	Michael Schultz	Story by : Steven Bochco & Alison Cross & Tom Szentgyörgyi & Jonathan R. Hiatt; Teleplay by : Tom Szentgyörgyi & Jonathan R. Hiatt	December 18, 2001	D111
12	"The Curse of the Klopman Diamonds"	Joe Ann Fogle	Story by : Steven Bochco & Alison Cross & Keith Eisner; Teleplay by : Keith Eisner	January 8, 2002	D112
13	"Ripley, Believe It or Not"	Rick Wallace	Alison Cross	January 15, 2002	D113
14	"Meat Me in Philly"	Charles Haid	Story by : Steven Bochco & Alison Cross & Tom Szentgyörgyi; Teleplay by : Tom Szentgyörgyi	February 5, 2002	D114
15	"Lies of Minelli"	Roy Campanella II	Story by : Steven Bochco & Alison Cross & Jonathan R. Hiatt; Teleplay by : Jonathan R. Hiatt	February 26, 2002	D115
16	"Here Comes the Judge"	Michael Switzer	Story by : Steven Bochco & Alison Cross & Keith Eisner; Teleplay by : Keith Eisner	March 5, 2002	D116
17	"There's No Business Like No Business"	Rick Wallace	Michael Rhodes	March 12, 2002	D117
18	"Brotherly Love"	Kevin Hooks	Story by : Steven Bochco & Alison Cross; Teleplay by : Alison Cross	March 19, 2002	D118
19	"San Diego Padre"	Michael Switzer	Story by : Steven Bochco & Tom Szentgyörgyi; Teleplay by : Tom Szentgyörgyi	April 16, 2002	D119
20	"Tall Tales"	Jesse Bochco	Story by : Steven Bochco & Keith Eisner; Teleplay by : Keith Eisner	April 23, 2002	D120
21	"Thanks for the Mammaries"	Joe Ann Fogle	Cheri Taylor	April 23, 2002	D121
22	"Mojo Rising"	Rick Wallace	Alison Cross & Jonathan R. Hiatt	May 28, 2002	D122

== Production ==
As Stephen Bochco had been developing a legal series, he was beginning to become weary of NYPD Blue. Feeling she was underutilized on the show, Bocho offered the lead role to cast member Delaney, who accepted. In March 2001, Scott and Hoffman were cast beside Delaney. ABC ordered the pilot to series in May, and Delaney officially departed NYPD Blue. Based on strong ratings, ABC ordered a full season in November. However, ratings declined over the season, and ABC officially canceled the series at its annual upfronts in May 2002.

== Broadcast ==
Philly was originally scheduled for premiere on September 18, 2001, and had a strong advertising push. However, following the September 11 attacks, the series was pushed to one week to September 25, 2001.

The complete series has not been released on DVD by CBS DVD but is for purchase to stream by episode or the entire season on Amazon Prime. The series briefly aired in syndication on Universal HD in 2008.

== Reception ==
The series received mixed reviews from critics. Ken Tucker of Entertainment Weekly gave the series a grade of "C", stating that the show "is like biting into a cold, stale version of the city's famous cheese steak — it gives you a lot to chew on, but it's pretty greasy, gummy fare." Phil Gallo at Variety gave a lukewarm review of the series, positively reviewing Delaney, but noting the show "lacked a distinctive tone".
