= Quiet Riot (Prison Break) =

- Prison Break episode
- Episode no.: Season 4 Episode 11
- Directed by: Kevin Hooks
- Written by: Seth Hoffman
- Production code: 4AKJ11
- Original air date: November 17, 2008

Guest appearances
- Michael Bryan French as Gregory White; Stacy Haiduk as Lisa Tabak; Shannon Lucio as Trishanne; Leon Russom as General Jonathan Krantz; Ron Yuan as Feng Huan

Episode chronology
← Previous "The Legend"	Next → "Selfless"
- Prison Break (season 4)

"Quiet Riot" is the 68th episode of the American television series Prison Break. It was broadcast on November 17, 2008 in the United States on the Fox Network. In this episode, the team finally breaks into the Scylla room in the Company headquarters.

== Plot ==
Michael Scofield and the team race against time trying to devise a plan to steal Scylla, as the Company will move Scylla to an unknown location on that same day. Michael, however, continues to suffer from his deteriorating health, and the team is forced to carry out the plan as Michael reluctantly agrees to have surgery that day. To reach Scylla, they must break through a concrete wall and a glass wall, without making any noise, changing the room temperature, or touching the floor.

Meanwhile, Gretchen dresses up to seduce the General and steal the sixth card that is necessary to decode Scylla. Having personally trained her, the General realizes that she is lying and threatens to kill her. Gretchen pleads with him, mentioning her daughter, whose father is supposedly the General. The General lets Gretchen go but tells her if he ever sees her again, he'll kill her.

T-Bag suddenly shows reluctance in continuing with the Scylla business, as he now has a respectable job and a comfortable life as Cole Pfeiffer. However, he forces himself to refuse his boss to go on a complementary cruise trip, as it leaves that same day. Mr. Xing barges into GATE again and demands Scylla, but Gretchen again promises him to deliver and asks for his help.

Even though Gretchen fails to steal the sixth card, Michael and his team proceed to steal Scylla. Michael, from a sense of guilt of leaving others in peril, changes his mind and postpones his surgery, joining the team after getting some injections from Sara. Via the underground from GATE to the Company headquarters, Michael, Lincoln, Sucre, and Mahone reach the concrete wall. They manage to break through with slow drilling, some umbrellas to catch the falling debris inside, and electromagnets to disrupt the steel linings inside the wall so that it can be dug silently.

Trishanne, T-Bag's assistant, listens to a call between T-Bag and Gretchen and alerts Agent Self. Don Self and Trishanne raid the address mentioned in the call, but end up in the hands of Mr. Xing after they are set up by Gretchen and T-Bag. Gretchen and T-Bag prepare to take Scylla for themselves once Michael and his team successfully retrieve Scylla.

In silence, Sucre assembles a ladder above the floor, one rung at a time, to traverse the alarm-rigged floor and reach the glass wall. To fool the temperature sensor, he releases liquid nitrogen inside the room. Sucre loses balance when the ladder shakes, but manages to grab the falling liquid nitrogen container and makes it back up. After tense moments, Sucre finishes the ladder to the glass wall. Although suffering from occasional pain, Michael crosses the ladder and makes a hole on the glass. As he approaches Scylla and places his hands upon it, a sensor beneath Scylla goes off, warning the General who calls for security and comes after Scylla himself.

== Reception ==
IGN gave the episode 8.8/10.
