= Selfless (Prison Break) =

- Prison Break episode
- Episode no.: Season 4 Episode 12
- Directed by: Michael Switzer
- Written by: Kalinda Vazquez
- Production code: 4AKJ12
- Original air date: November 24, 2008

Guest appearances
- Michael Bryan French as Gregory White; Stacy Haiduk as Lisa Tabak; Shannon Lucio as Miriam Hultz; Graham McTavish as Ferguson; Michael O'Neill as Herb Stanton; Leon Russom as General Jonathan Krantz; Ron Yuan as Feng Huan

Episode chronology
← Previous "Quiet Riot"	Next → "Deal Or No Deal"
- Prison Break (season 4)

"Selfless" is the 69th episode of the American television series Prison Break and was broadcast on November 24, 2008 in the United States on the Fox Network.

== Plot ==
The General and two of his bodyguards enter the vault to stop Michael from taking Scylla. However, when they exit the elevator, they are held at gunpoint by Lincoln, Mahone, and Sucre. The General reluctantly hands over the sixth final card. He gloats that the convicts are five cards short, but is shocked when he sees that the convicts possess perfect copies of the other cards, allowing Michael to access the unit and take Scylla. The convicts then take the elevator back upstairs and barricade themselves in the General's office. Meanwhile, Self and Trishanne are still being held captive by Feng, but Trishanne yells to create a distraction, and Self gets free and kills their captors, and Trishanne kills Feng instinctively, which seems to make Self concerned. At GATE, Mr White introduces himself to Gretchen, who is once again conferring with T-Bag, only to see their machine guns under the desk. Mr White slips back to his office, but Gretchen holds him at gunpoint while T-Bag forces the other hostages into the office. Back at Company headquarters, the General believes that the convicts have no plan and are trapped when he gets a phone call. It's from Sara, who has Lisa Tabak—a cardholder and the General's daughter—at gunpoint in a hotel bathroom. To save his daughter, the General allows the convicts to go free. They drive to the airport in a Company truck for a rendezvous with Self, where Sucre and Mahone go their own way while Michael and Lincoln head into the airport. Company agents stop the brothers and take their backpack (which contains the Scylla unit), only to be caught themselves by airport police tipped off by Mahone. When the agents and the police search the brothers' backpack, they realise Scylla isn't there: Sucre and Mahone had it the whole time. In the GATE offices, Trishanne returns to resume her cover only to discover the hostage situation. She tries to free the hostages, and although Mr. White is killed by Gretchen, she manages to force T-Bag and Gretchen out of the building. In the parking lot, Gretchen tries to double-cross T-Bag when Trishanne shows up in a car. Gretchen escapes, but T-Bag is caught and arrested by Trishanne, who reveals that she is actually Miriam Holtz from Homeland Security.

Self meets the group at the warehouse after the successful mission. Michael hands over Scylla, and Self gives them an envelope full of release papers and tells them that Homeland Security are sending vans to take them for final processing, and an ambulance to take Michael to the hospital. While the group contemplates their imminent freedom, Self meets Holtz in an abandoned lot, where she has T-Bag handcuffed in her car. Self verifies what she and T-Bag know about the potential Scylla buyers, before apologizing to her and pulling out his gun and shooting her dead. In the warehouse, the group has been waiting for an hour. Michael calls Self on his mobile phone, which is now disconnected. He opens the envelope that supposedly contains the group's release papers, but it's full of blank sheets of paper, and they realize that Self has betrayed them.

== Reception ==
IGN called it the best episode of the entire series, giving it a perfect score of 10 out of 10.
