= Quiet Riot (disambiguation) =

Quiet Riot is an American heavy metal band.

Quiet Riot may also refer to:

- Quiet Riot (1978 album), an album by Quiet Riot
- QR (album) also known as Quiet Riot, an album by Quiet Riot
- "Quiet Riot" (Dexter's Laboratory), a television episode
- "Quiet Riot" (Prison Break), a television episode
