= Hard Luck (2006 film) =

- Official DVD cover
- Directed by: Mario Van Peebles
- Written by: Larry Brand; Mario Van Peebles
- Story by: Larry Brand
- Produced by: Donald Kushner; Mario Van Peebles; Brad Wyman
- Starring: Wesley Snipes; Jacquelyn Quinones; Cybill Shepherd; James Liao; Bill Cobbs; Mario Van Peebles
- Cinematography: Alex Nepomniaschy
- Edited by: Edward R. Abroms
- Music by: Tree Adams and self-titled Single "Hard Luck" co-produced by TAMA GIRARD
- Production companies: MVP Films; Raamen Filmworks; Xit Financial Group
- Distributed by: Sony Pictures Home Entertainment
- Release date: October 17, 2006
- Running time: 101 minutes
- Language: English
- Budget: $12 million

Hard Luck is a 2006 American thriller film written, produced and directed by Mario Van Peebles, who also co-stars in the film. The film stars Wesley Snipes, Jacquelyn Quinones, Cybill Shepherd, James Liao and Bill Cobbs. The film was released direct-to-DVD in the United States on October 17, 2006.

Hard Luck features a collaboration between Wesley Snipes, Mario Van Peebles and Bill Cobbs. It reunited the trio for the first time since 1991's New Jack City. Wesley Snipes played Lucky, a down on his luck former criminal and drug dealer whose post prison trials and tribulations take him on a wild adventure.

== Plot ==
As the film begins, a former criminal and drug dealer named Lucky (Wesley Snipes) is released from prison. He tries to lead a respectable life, despite his troubled past. However, Lucky once or twice reflects on the wisdom of his grandfather who supposedly told him "sometimes without bad luck, it would seem you don't have any luck at all." Shortly after his release from prison, Lucky tries to get back on his feet but inexplicably ends up a victim of Hurricane Katrina's wrath, and loses his newly found life.

After Lucky returns to New York, Lucky is dealt another blow when the government withdraws funds for his yoga and samba dance classes which he uses to try to keep kids off the streets. This unfortunate event leads to Lucky enduring the bad influences of two old friends from his past life as a criminal, who lure Lucky to a strip club under the false pretense of his friend's birthday. When a drug deal with some dangerous mobsters goes bad, and Lucky is now on the run with a feisty Puerto Rican stripper from the strip club, Angela (Jacquelyn Quinones), and over $500,000 in American currency, which is wired with marking dye.

Later that night, there are short cuts of an unconventional and troubled couple, unexplained and also known to the police as the "Sawtooth Killers". Chang (James Liao), an egotistical and maniacal accomplice to his old-fashioned girlfriend Cass (Cybill Shepherd), the mother of a mentally challenged man named Eugene (Mike Messier). Motivated by Cass's son Eugene's unpleasant experiences with society's rejection of mentally challenged individuals, the couple brutally kidnaps, tortures, and presumably kills their abductees, recording their exploits on video, possibly for future viewing.

Angela and Lucky find themselves caught up in the path of violence, and Lucky ends up an unlikely hero by saving the life of a would be victim of the Sawtooth Killers. Lucky saves Captain Davis (Mario Van Peebles) from Cass's son Eugene, who is armed with a shovel. Lucky chooses to have a positive outlook on the events by using perspective gained from his grandfather, characterizes the events as being "the luckiest day in an unlucky man's life." Lucky and Angela go on to receive a $200,000 reward which had been offered by the police for information leading to the capture, arrest, and or prosecution of the Sawtooth Killers.

== Cast ==
- Wesley Snipes as Lucky
- Jacquelyn Quinones as Angela
- Cybill Shepherd as Cass
- James Liao as Chang
- Aubrey Dollar as "Rain"
- Kevin Thoms as Roland
- Adrian Washington as "Lucky"
- Noah Fleiss as Sol Rosenbaum
- Bill Cobbs as Cobb
- Kevin Chapman as Franklin
- Tom Kemp as Gino Gambetta
- Mike Messier as Eugene
- Mario Van Peebles as Captain Davis
- Tony Hua as Detective Lee
- Luis Guzmán as "Million Dollar" Mendez
- Melvin Van Peebles as Hospital Prophet

== Production ==
=== Filming ===
Hard Luck is set and was filmed in Rhode Island. Part of the film was made at the University of Rhode Island's W. Alton Jones Campus. Filming lasted 56 days, from 3 October to 28 November 2005.

== Release ==
=== Home media ===
DVD was released in Region 1 in the United States on October 17, 2006, and also Region 2 in the United Kingdom on 26 February 2007, it was distributed by Sony Pictures Home Entertainment.
