= The Primevals =

2023 sci-fi adventure film directed by David W. Allen

- Theatrical release poster
- Directed by: David Allen
- Written by: David Allen; Randall William Cook
- Story by: David Allen
- Produced by: Charles Band
- Starring: Richard Joseph Paul; Juliet Mills; Leon Russom; Walker Brandt; Robert Cornthwaite
- Cinematography: Adolfo Bartoli
- Music by: Richard Band
- Production company: Castel Film Romania
- Distributed by: Full Moon Entertainment
- Release dates: July 23, 2023 (Fantasia Film Festival); March 11, 2024 (United States)
- Running time: 90 minutes
- Country: United States
- Language: English

The Primevals is a 2023 American science fiction fantasy adventure film from Full Moon Entertainment, co-written and directed by David Allen, and starring Juliet Mills. The film was a passion project for stop motion animator Allen and completed posthumously after over 50 years in development.

== Plot ==
After a Yeti is killed by a group of Sherpa, a team of university scientists travel to Nepal to find the origins of the creature. Teaming up with a rugged tracker, the group set out from the Sherpa village and, after a large avalanche, discover a hidden primeval land populated by prehistoric creatures, ancient hominids, and an alien reptilian species.

== Cast ==
- Richard Joseph Paul as Matthew Connor
- Juliet Mills as Dr. Claire Collier
- Leon Russom as Rondo Montana
- Walker Brandt as Kathleen Reidel
- Robert Cornthwaite as Dr. Lloyd Trent
- Kevin Mangold as Hominid
- Eric Steinberg as Tenzang
- Tai Thai as Siku

== Production ==
The origin of The Primevals lay in an older project titled Raiders of the Stone Ring that was developed in the late 1960s by stop-motion animator David Allen, Dennis Muren, and Jim Danforth. The plot, which started as an Edgar Rice Burroughs pastiche, involved a group of explorers in the 1920s who discover an unevolved Viking society that was threatened by a race of malevolent lizard-men. The group filmed a promo reel for the film with the intent of garnering funding to complete the project. Through Danforth, the project came to the attention of Hammer Films, but negotiations stalled as the studio morphed the project into a different unrealized treatment titled Zeppelin vs. Pterodactyl.

In the early 1970s, Allen returned to the project with the hopes of fleshing out the treatment. An initial script was co-written with Mark McGee that was alternately called The Glacial Empire and later Primordium: The Arctic World. In the mid-1970s, Allen wrote an outline for the project, now called The Primevals, and was later contacted by Randall William Cook, who was curious about the status of the project, as he had a potential backer lined up. Together they wrote the first draft of film, however, the intended funding had dried up. This script - while altered and updated over time - proved to be the basis for the eventual film. While working on the low budget sci-fi picture Laserblast, special effects artist Steve Neill mentioned Allen's stop motion work to producer-director Charles Band. Band was later shown the promotional reel for the film and immediately agreed to finance the picture via his Charles Band Productions.

Despite making the cover of Cinefantastique magazine, the project stalled after only a few months of pre-production. In the early 1980s it found a new production home under Band's Empire Pictures, although Allen continued to seek funding on his own—even taking out a full-page ad in Variety as David Allen Productions in July 1980. While the project was heavily advertised as part of Empire's slate of upcoming pictures throughout the company's four-year run, it also never got past the pre-production stage while at the studio.

The project was revived again when Band started Full Moon Entertainment in the late 1980s. One of the most ambitious projects for the company, the film is said to have cost several million dollars. Principal photography was done primarily in Romania in the summer of 1994 and was projected to last 10–12 weeks. Filming also took place in the Dolomites mountain range in northeastern Italy. Band briefly considered retitling the film Hybrids for his family-oriented Moonbeam Entertainment line before eventually reverted to the original title.

Following a separation from Paramount Home Video, Full Moon suffered from financial difficulties that restricted the completion of the project. Allen continued to intermittently work on the film between projects before he died at the age of 54 in 1999. Allen left the film elements, storyboards, stop motion puppets and all of his equipment in the care of his colleague Chris Endicott. In the ensuing years, Endicott and Band thought of ways to resurrect and complete the project. In 2018, Band launched an Indiegogo campaign to seek completion funds, resulting in over $40,000 raised. Endicott worked with stop-motion animator Kent Burton, and a small army of visual effects artists—many of them friends of David Allen to donate their services in order to get Allen's film finished with the meager funds available.

== Release ==
In June 2023, it was announced the film would have its world premiere at the Fantasia Film Festival in Canada on July 23, 2023. The same month the company debuted the trailer for the finished film.

The film was released in the United States, in limited theaters on March 11, 2024.

== Home media ==
Not long after its limited theatrical release, the film was made available on video on demand on May 31, 2024. The same month Full Moon unveiled an "Ultimate Collector's Edition" of the film that showcases two cuts and a making of documentary over three discs to be available in July 2024. On October 1, the film was released on a single DVD and Blu-ray release.
