= Wilbur Fitzgerald =

American film and television actor

- Born: September 15, 1948 (age 77)
- Occupations: Film and television actor
- Years active: 1983–present
- Spouse: Dianna Fitzgerald

Wilbur Fitzgerald (born September 15, 1948) is an American film and television actor. He is best known for playing district attorney Gerard Darnelle in the American crime drama television series In the Heat of the Night.

Fitzgerald appeared in numerous television programs including NCIS: New Orleans, Matlock, Walker, Texas Ranger, Prison Break, Drop Dead Diva, Friday Night Lights, The Cape and October Road. He also appeared in numerous films such as The Hunger Games: Catching Fire, Anchorman 2: The Legend Continues, The Rose and the Jackal (as a reporter), RoboCop 3, The Greening of Whitney Brown, Baby Driver, Radioland Murders, That Darn Cat, and Are You There God? It's Me, Margaret.

Fitzgerald played Captain Will Fritz in the 2016 miniseries 11.22.63.
