= Kevin Hooks =

American actor (born 1958)

- Born: September 19, 1958 (age 68); Philadelphia, Pennsylvania, U.S.
- Occupations: Actor, director
- Years active: 1969–present
- Spouses: Regina Hooks (m. 1978; div. 1984): Cheryl Hooks
- Children: 3
- Parent: Robert Hooks

Kevin Hooks (born September 19, 1958)is an American actor and television and film director. His acting credits include Aaron Loves Angela,Sounder, and the television series The White Shadow, in which he portrayed Morris Thorpe.

== Early life and acting career ==
Kevin Hooks was born in Philadelphia, Pennsylvania, the son of Yvonne, a state employee, and Robert Hooks, a director and actor who starred in many films in the 1970s. Kevin's nickname among his friends is "King Royal".

Hooks lived in Southwest, Washington, D.C. in the late 1970s. He attended Potomac High School in Oxon Hill, Maryland.

At age 10, Hooks starred in J.T., a 1969 episode of the CBS Children's Hour about a young boy in Harlem who befriends a sick cat. Written by Jane Wagner, it was a Peabody Award winner.

Hooks appeared in the 1972 film Sounder as the eldest son of the characters portrayed by Paul Winfield's and Cicely Tyson. His character assumes family responsibilities on a sharecropping farm during the Great Depression. The adults were nominated for Best Actor and Best Actress Oscars respectively for their performances.

Hooks won a role in the last film directed by Gordon Parks Jr., Aaron Loves Angela (1975). Set in Harlem, the film portrays a romance between African-American and Puerto Rican teenagers and has been compared to Romeo and Juliet. Hooks portrayed a withdrawn teenager opposite 15-year-old Irene Cara. Jose Feliciano appears in a supporting role. The film follows the young lovers as they face opposition to their relationship, and their secret meeting place becomes the location of a drug deal. The film received mixed critical responses.

Hooks portrayed high school basketball player Morris Thorpe in the television series The White Shadow, which aired from 1978 to 1981. Morris Thorpe was reportedly voted one of America's 100 favorite characters in the history of television.

In 1986, he starred in the short-lived ABC sitcom He's the Mayor.

== Director roles ==
In 1991, Hooks directed the film Strictly Business, and also appeared in one scene opposite Kim Coles. He directed Wesley Snipes in Passenger 57, Cynthia Rothrock and Stacy Keach in Irresistible Force, Laurence Fishburne and Stephen Baldwin in Fled, and also Patrick Swayze in Black Dog. Hooks worked as a director and producer on the series Prison Break. He also directed two episodes from the first season of Lost, "White Rabbit" and "Homecoming".

In 2000, Hooks directed the Disney Channel original film The Color of Friendship, which was based on a true story.

In 2003, Hooks directed a television remake of Sounder. He directed ABC's Wonderful World of Disney's TV remake of the film, with Paul Winfield, his co-star from the original, playing a different role.

Hooks directed the following episodes of Prison Break:

- 1.14 – "The Rat"
- 1.22 – "Flight"
- 2.01 – "Manhunt"
- 2.09 – "Unearthed"
- 2.14 – "John Doe"
- 2.22 – "Sona"
- 3.01 – "Orientacion"
- 3.06 – "Photo Finish"
- 3.12 – "Hell or High Water"
- 4.01 – "Scylla"
- 4.11 – "Quiet Riot"
- 4.16 – "The Sunshine State"
- 4.22 – "Killing Your Number"

He directed the film Prison Break: The Final Break (2009) based on the series.

Hooks directed Madiba (2017), a three-part BET television miniseries about Nelson Mandela and the struggle against apartheid in South Africa, starring Laurence Fishburne as Mandela.

In 2020, Hooks directed an episode of The Good Lord Bird.

== Bibliography ==
- Holmstrom, John. The Moving Picture Boy: An International Encyclopaedia from 1895 to 1995. Norwich, Michael Russell, 1996, p. 324.
