= Michael Switzer =

American film and television director

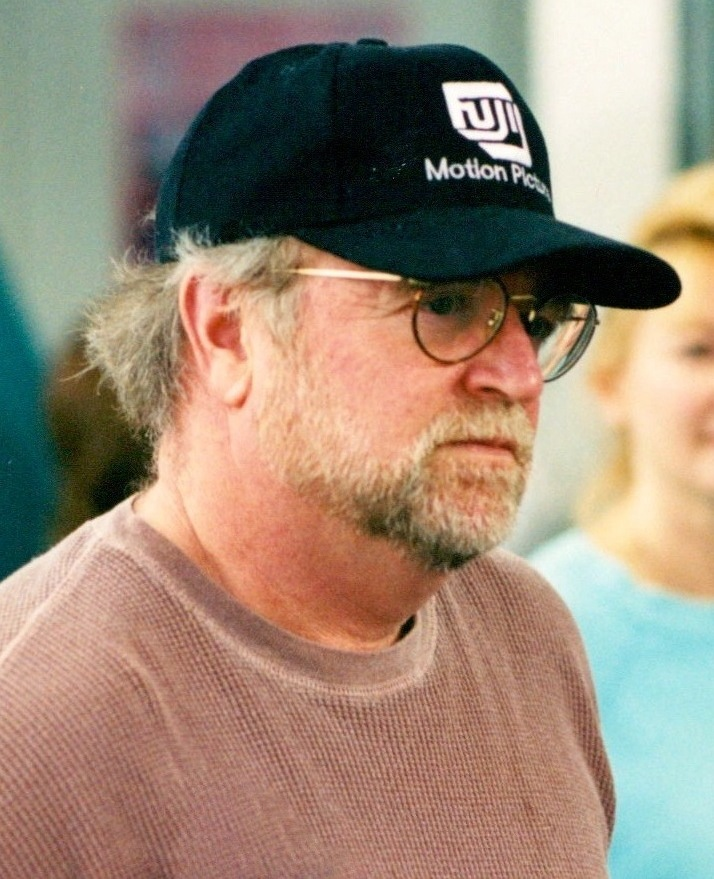
- Switzer on the set of Forever Love (1998)
- Born: May 27, 1948 (age 78); New York City, U.S.
- Education: American University, American Film Institute (AFI)
- Occupations: Film director, television director, university professor
- Years active: 1982–2008
- Spouse: Susan Goldberg

Michael Switzer (born May 27, 1948) is an American film and television director.

Some of his credits in episodic television include M*A*S*H, Hill Street Blues, Quantum Leap, Fame (writer for one episode), Rags to Riches, Misfits of Science, JAG, NYPD Blue. He has also directed a number of television films.

His last directing crediting credit was the Prison Break episode "Selfless" in 2008.
