= Michael Bryan French =

American actor

Michael Bryan French is an American stage, film and television actor known for his roles on Orange is the New Black, Prison Break, Madoff, CSI: Crime Scene Investigation, and As the World Turns.

== Early life ==
French was born in Lackawanna, New York and raised in Elmira, New York.

== Career ==
In 1990, he played the role of Sam on As the World Turns. Throughout the 1990s he guest starred on L.A. Law, Quantum Leap, Matlock, Roseanne, The X-Files, Step by Step, Cybill, ER, The Drew Carrey Show, Sliders, Diagnosis Murder, and The Pretender. He played a doctor in the 1998 film I Know What You Did Last Summer.

In the 2000s, he appeared on Judging Amy, The West Wing, Crossing Jordan, Cold Case, Boston Legal, Days of Our Lives, 24, Bones and the 2002 film Big Fat Liar.

In 2008, he appeared in six episodes of the Fox drama Prison Break as Gregory White, the boss of T-Bag, while Bagwell was working at the GATE corporation under the name Cole Pfeiffer in order to help secure Scylla.

He played Dr. Franks in seven episodes of CSI: Crime Scene Investigation from 2004 to 2009.

More recently he guest starred on Breaking Bad, The Good Wife, and Person of Interest and had a small role in the 2013 film The Wolf of Wall Street.

His most recent roles have been as Management and Correction Corporation employee Jack Pearson who is also the father of Danny Pearson on the Netflix comedy-drama Orange Is the New Black and Blake North on the ABC miniseries Madoff.

== Filmography ==
=== Film ===
Michael Bryan French' film credits
Year	Title	Role	Notes
1994	Independence Day	Man	Short film
1996	The Glimmer Man	Russian Detective #1	
2002	Big Fat Liar	Harry Shepherd	

=== Television ===
Michael Bryan French' television credits
Year	Title	Role	Notes
1956	As the World Turns	Sam	
1990	L.A. Law	Dennis O'Connell	Episode: "Watts a Matter?"
