= James Hiroyuki Liao =

American actor (born 1976)

- Born: February 6, 1976 (age 50); New York City, New York, U.S.
- Other names: James Liao; James Hirouki Liso; Jay Lee
- Education: Juilliard School (GrDip)
- Occupation: Actor
- Years active: 2004–present

James Hiroyuki Liao (born February 6, 1976) is an American actor. He is known for his television roles such as Roland Glenn in the Fox crime drama series Prison Break (2008), Jay Lee in the police procedural series Unforgettable (2013–2016), and Albert Nguyen in the HBO tragicomedy crime series Barry (2019–2022).

Liao also portrayed Kenji in the video game Ghost of Tsushima (2020) and General Stephen Mori in the DC Universe (DCU) superhero franchise.

== Early life, family and education ==
Liao was born on February 6, 1976, in Bensonhurst, Brooklyn, New York City, New York, where he was also raised. His father is Taiwanese, and his mother is Japanese.

He attended graduate school at the Juilliard School's drama division, finishing in 2004. He studied at the Marjorie Ballentine Studio, where he befriended Amaury Nolasco (they would later perform together in the TV series Prison Break during its fourth season).

== Career ==
Liao played Roland Glenn in season four of Prison Break. He starred in other television roles, such as 24, CSI: Crime Scene Investigation, Bones, CSI: Miami, and Law & Order. He was a recurring character in the TV series Barry. He also starred with Jennifer Aniston in the feature film Management.

His stage work includes playing Song Liling (Butterfly) in Washington DC's Arena Stage production of M. Butterfly.

In 2025, he played U.S. Secretary of Defense General Stephen Mori in the DCU film Superman, reprising the role in the subsequent second season of Peacemaker.

== Filmography ==
=== Film ===
| Year | Title | Role | Notes |
|---|---|---|---|
| 2009 | Management | AI | |
| 2011 | Battle: Los Angeles | LCpl. Steven Mottola | |
| 2012 | Frankenweenie | Toshiaki | Voice |
| 2013 | Star Trek Into Darkness | U.S.S. Vengeance Bridge Officer | |
| 2020 | Lost Girls | Michael Pak | |
| 2021 | Snake Eyes: G.I. Joe Origins | Yasuko | |
| 2025 | Superman | General Stephen Mori | |

=== Television ===
| Year | Title | Role | Notes | Source |
|---|---|---|---|---|
| 2004 | Law & Order | Bobby Ito | Episode: "Gaijin" | |
| 2004 | CSI: Miami | M.E. Assistant | Episode: "MIA/NYC Nonstop" | |
| 2005 | Law & Order: Trial by Jury | ADA Eddie Perkins | Episode: "Truth or Consequences" | |
| 2007 | Bones | Assistant Coroner | Episode: "The Man in the Mansion" | |
| 2007–2008 | CSI: Crime Scene Investigation | Eric 'Precious Ricky' Hong | 2 episodes | |
| 2008 | The Shield | Llewellyn Wang | Episode: "Game Face" | |
| 2008 | Prison Break | Roland Glenn | 7 episodes | |
| 2010 | 24 | Devon Rosenthal | 3 episodes | |
| 2011 | House | Luca | Episode: "Moving On" | |
| 2013–2016 | Unforgettable | Jay Lee | 34 episodes | |
| 2016 | NCIS | Brandon Pierce | Episode: "Radio Silence" | |
| 2016 | Heartbeat | Rafe Tollefson | Episode: "Sanctuary" | |
| 2017 | Preacher | Teddy Gunth | Episode: "Viktor" | |
| 2017–2018 | SEAL Team | Dr. Lucien | 3 episodes | |
| 2018 | Iron Fist | Albert | Episode: "The Fury of Iron Fist" | |
| 2018 | Manifest | Rob | Episode: "Turbulence" | |
| 2019–2022 | Barry | Albert Nguyen | Recurring; seasons 2–3 | |
| 2021 | Cowboy Bebop | Tanaka | Episode: "Cowboy Gospel" | |
| 2022 | The Dropout | Edmond Ku | Miniseries | |
| 2022–2024 | Blue Bloods | Lieutenant Fleming | Recurring | |
| 2023 | Orphan Black: Echoes | Paul Darros | Main role | |
| 2024 | Presumed Innocent | Herbert Kumagai | Recurring | |
| 2025 | Star Trek: Section 31 | San | Television film | |
| 2025 | Peacemaker | General Stephen Mori | Episode: "Full Nelson" | |
| 2026 | One Piece | Ipponmatsu | Episode: "The Beginning and the End" | |

=== Direct to Video ===
| Year | Title | Role | Notes |
|---|---|---|---|
| 2006 | Hard Luck | Chang | |

=== Video games ===
| Year | Title | Role | Notes |
|---|---|---|---|
| 2020 | Ghost of Tsushima | Kenji | English voice and motion capture |
