= Alexander Mahone =

Character on American television series Prison Break

- Prison Break character
- William Fichtner as Agent Alexander Mahone
- First appearance: "Manhunt" (2006)
- Last appearance: The Final Break (2009)
- Created by: Paul Scheuring
- Portrayed by: William Fichtner

In-universe information
- Aliases: Frank Zwan (S4E06); Bruce Liberace (S4E16)
- Occupation: US Army Infantry, US Army Spec OPS, Special Agent In Charge (FBI); The Company employee
- Family: Cameron Mahone (son)
- Spouse: Pamela "Pam" Mahone
- Significant other: Felicia Lang

Alexander "Alex" Mahone is a fictional character portrayed by William Fichtner in the American television series Prison Break. Mahone is introduced in the premiere of the second season as a special agent in the Federal Bureau of Investigation, specializing in manhunts for escaped prisoners for 14 years.

When the protagonist of the series, Michael Scofield (Wentworth Miller), successfully orchestrates the escape of eight prisoners from Fox River State Penitentiary, Mahone is assigned to spearhead the task force assembled to recapture the fugitives and manages to capture four of them. He is later arrested in Panama and imprisoned in Penitenciaría Federal de Sona in the second-season finale. Mahone manages to escape, and is coerced into taking down the Company, a secret group of multinationals which exerts an influence on the White House. An assassin is hired by the Company to murder his son, and Mahone spends the majority of season four seeking revenge.

The writers created Mahone's character for the second season as a fugitive pursuer who was not corrupt. As the number of antagonists increased, they developed Mahone as a foil to Scofield. The writers sought to portray Mahone as a morally ambiguous character, shifting the audience's sympathy toward him. Fichtner, attracted by the character's potential, was cast as Mahone just one day before filming began on the second season. He initially signed on for two seasons but was later persuaded to return for a third.

== Plot ==
=== Background ===
Mahone was born at Boardman, Ohio into an abusive family, and was repeatedly beaten by his father. After joining the military Mahone was transferred to Special Ops during the Gulf War, later becoming an FBI Special Agent. The nature of his quick advancement is questioned, and many of his files are classified.

He married a woman named Pamela (Callie Thorne) and they had a son, Cameron. The marriage lasts for 12 years until Mahone abruptly ends it without explanation, ordering his family out of the house.

Before separating from his wife Mahone pursued Oscar Shales, a murderer whom he struggled to capture; it is revealed that Mahone killed Shales and buried the body in his backyard. Fearful that his wife would discover his secret, he cuts her out of his life. Mahone is plagued with visions of Shales, which cause him to self-medicate with prescription drugs.

=== Season 2 ===
Mahone in Season 2.

After eight prisoners escape from the Fox River State Penitentiary, Mahone leads the investigation to capture them. Reviewing their files, he decides to concentrate his efforts on Michael Scofield, mastermind of the breakout. He tracks the escapees to Oswego, Illinois, but they manage to escape. Mahone continues to pursue Michael and his brother Lincoln Burrows (Dominic Purcell), who are able to avoid him on several occasions. While investigating a car explosion Mahone is shown to have a drug problem, swallowing pills concealed in a pen.

Mahone eventually tracks down John Abruzzi (Peter Stormare) and David "Tweener" Apolskis (Lane Garrison). Mahone orders his men to shoot Abruzzi to death when he fails to surrender, and later murders Tweener in cold blood. When he returns to his office, Mahone is questioned by Internal Affairs Agent Richard Sullins (Kim Coates) about their suspicious deaths.

It is revealed that Mahone was being blackmailed by Paul Kellerman (Paul Adelstein), a Secret Service agent forced to work for the Company. Kellerman threatens to reveal that Mahone killed Shales, and forces him to kill all the escapees in exchange for his silence. Although hesitant, Mahone agrees when an operative of the Company, Agent Kim (Reggie Lee), threatens to murder his family. Mahone continues his hunt for the remaining six escapees but is betrayed and shot by Kellerman, who transfers his allegiance to the brothers. He survives and decides to stop chasing the escapees, but is forced to resume his search when his son is injured in a car accident orchestrated by one of Kim's agents. Before returning to work, he murders the agent who arranged the accident. Mahone returns to his FBI field office, where he is informed by Agent Wheeler (Jason Davis) that Internal Affairs is investigating him.

When Charles "Haywire" Patoshik (Silas Weir Mitchell) murders a civilian, Mahone asks Brad Bellick (Wade Williams) (former captain of correctional officers at Fox River) to help him find Haywire. Bellick finds Haywire, chasing him up a grain mill; Mahone climbs the mill and talks Haywire into committing suicide.

Mahone's next target, Benjamin Miles "C-Note" Franklin (Rockmond Dunbar), narrowly evades him; C-Note soon offers to turn himself in, however, if his wife and child are cared for. C-Note is taken to jail, and Mahone tells him to commit suicide in order to guarantee the protection of his family. C-Note attempts suicide, but is rescued by the guards. Sullins makes a deal with him, and promises to release him if he testifies against Mahone.

Because he is unable to capture Michael, Mahone orders Agent Lang (Barbara Eve Harris) to follow Michael's girlfriend Sara Tancredi (Sarah Wayne Callies). Mahone's sanity begins to unravel from his determination to catch Michael and Lincoln, and from his benzodiazepine addiction. Michael and Lincoln travel to Panama, where Mahone lures them into a trap by impersonating fellow escapee Fernando Sucre (Amaury Nolasco). He captures Lincoln and contacts Michael, ordering him to surrender Charles Westmoreland's (Muse Watson) five million dollars and his boat, the Christina Rose. Michael plants drugs on the Christina Rose, which he gives to Mahone. After an attempt to kill Kim, Mahone takes the boat and leaves; however, he is arrested on drug-possession charges. Mahone is taken to Sona along with Michael, Bellick and Fox River escapee Theodore "T-Bag" Bagwell (Robert Knepper).

=== Season 3 ===
Inside Sona, Mahone attempts to convince Michael to form a partnership. Michael refuses to work with him, angry because Mahone killed his father. As new prisoners, Michael and Mahone are brought before Lechero (Robert Wisdom) (a prisoner who rules Sona and its residents). When Mahone learns about the bounty placed on fellow inmate James Whistler (Chris Vance), he manages to find him and deliver him to Lechero.

Mahone begins to suffer from drug withdrawal and is informed by his state-appointed lawyer that his trial is almost a full year away. When Whistler realizes that Michael is not entirely on his side, he forms an alliance with Mahone. Mahone deduces that Michael is planning to break Whistler out of the prison, and Michael eventually agrees to let him join the escape. After he begins hallucinating about Haywire, Mahone accepts heroin from T-Bag to calm himself.

Agent Lang visits Mahone and offers him a deal: eight years in a St. Louis prison in exchange for testifying against the government in the Lincoln Burrows conspiracy, or multiple homicide charges if he does not cooperate. Mahone eventually accepts the offer and confesses to Lang that he killed Shales, and that guilt made him turn to drugs. Because he is unable to maintain his composure while testifying, Mahone's testimony is dismissed, and Lang is forced to return Mahone to Sona.

Mahone (now rehabilitated) approaches Whistler and Michael and rejoins the escape. He is informed that their escape route (a tunnel leading to the edge of the prison) is almost complete, and that they will break out of Sona that night. Michael, Whistler, Mahone and fellow inmate McGrady (Carlo Alban) manage to escape; Lechero, T-Bag and Bellick are caught by the Sona guards.

Lincoln wants to shoot Mahone in revenge for killing his father, but Whistler escapes from Lincoln's custody and Lincoln is forced to chase him. Mahone takes advantage of the situation and flees, eventually making his way to a bar.

Mahone is approached by Whistler, who offers him a job in the Company with him and operative Gretchen Morgan (Jodi Lyn O'Keefe). Mahone warns Whistler that Gretchen is the "weak link", and that Michael will eventually hunt them down if Gretchen has indeed killed Sara.

=== Season 4 ===
Mahone accepts Whistler's offer to work for the Company, although the group is secretly working with Homeland Security to destroy the Company, focusing their attention on a card (code-named "Scylla"), which contains information on all of the Company's agents and operations. Whistler finds the card; however, he is killed by the Company's hitman, Wyatt (Cress Williams), who takes the card.

Mahone returns to his family home to find his son has been murdered and since he is a wanted criminal, he is arrested by the police. Mahone is contacted by Agent Don Self (Michael Rapaport), a Homeland Security agent who was working with Whistler to take down the Company. He offers Mahone freedom if he joins an unofficial operation to recover Scylla from the Company. Mahone accepts, learning that other members of the operation are Michael, Lincoln, Sara, Bellick, Sucre and computer hacker and identity thief Roland Glenn (James Hiroyuki Liao). The group devises a plan to regain the card, which succeeds, however, they learn that Scylla is actually made up of six cards held by different members of The Company. The group continues to look for the other cards, while Mahone asks Lang to find out who killed his son.

Mahone obtains a picture of Wyatt and meets with his estranged wife Pam, who makes him promise to hunt down and kill Wyatt. When Wyatt is captured Mahone tortures him, forcing him to apologize to his wife over the phone. He ties a cinderblock to Wyatt's wrists, and drowns him in the ocean. The group manages to complete Scylla, and Lincoln absolves Mahone for his role in his father's death. Self betrays the team and steals Scylla, forcing them to be fugitives once again.

While the others hunt Self, Mahone meets with Lang and asks for help. Lang calls Wheeler to help Mahone; however, Wheeler lies to Mahone about a meeting with the Attorney General and arrests him. While transporting Mahone to the airport, Lang allows him to escape and lies to Wheeler about the direction in which he has fled. Mahone returns to help Lincoln, Self, T-Bag and Gretchen retrieve Scylla. When Gretchen is shot while trying to double-cross the team, Mahone and the others leave her for the authorities.

After realizing Lincoln's mother (Christina Scofield) took Scylla, Mahone helps him stop her and retrieve Scylla after the Company threatens him with a photo of Pam. He later saves Lincoln from being assassinated by one of Christina's snipers. Mahone identifies one of the people who have connections with Christina, Vincent Sandinsky. The team does not find any connections with him and he believes his story. They catch him in the lie; after Krantz arrives to take charge they interrogate Sandinsky, who reveals some information about a hotel room. He and the team track a car rental slip and after more digging, eventually find the car (with their passports) outside the energy conference; they realize it is a set-up. It is revealed that Christina is setting the team up for the assassination of the Indian Prime Minister's son (who was thought to have brought Scylla). After the assassination of Naveen Banarjee, Mahone and Self are outside the hotel on the phone with Scofield and Burrows. The brothers tell Mahone to go to the apartment where Sara is holding Christina hostage, and make Christina talk by any means necessary. Mahone goes to the apartment, finding only Sara tied up and gagged; he unties Sara and heads back to the loft, where the General and T-Bag are. Mahone, Michael and Lincoln then head to a bank, where they believe Christina is with Scylla. They enter the bank wearing masks, to avoid being recognized. They take Scylla, and when they get outside a shootout begins. Mahone and Michael get away, but Linc is caught.

In the next episode, Mahone and Michael are the only ones left on the team. Linc and Sara are captured, and Self is in the hospital. Mahone and Michael decide it is time to bring the Company down and save everyone; they decide to go after Lincoln first. They set up a trap for Christina, but the police arrive; one of Christina's guards is killed in an explosion set up by Michael and meant for Christina. Later Michael gives Scylla to Mahone without the hard drive and has him save Lincoln, while Michael goes after Sara. Mahone has a bomb in Scylla which is large enough to kill Christina and her man, Downey. Christina has Mahone put in the same room Lincoln is in, moving Lincoln to the other side of the room. When the bomb fails to detonate and Christina realizes there is something wrong with Scylla, she calls on Mahone to check the device and threatens to kill him if he cannot activate it. He sets it manually. After a struggle with Christina and Downey, Mahone runs to the room where Lincoln is; the bomb detonates, killing Downey, but Christina survives. Michael and Sara come to pick up Lincoln and Mahone and head to another location, where Scylla's hard drive is. The remaining team then heads to a hospital for supplies to treat Lincoln's gunshot wound. Sara and Mahone go into the hospital, and Mahone is arrested by Federal agents. He is later freed and exonerated when Michael delivers Scylla to Kellerman. In the series' epilogue (set four years later), Mahone has begun dating Lang, and he, Lincoln, Sucre, Michael's child and Sara visit Michael's grave at a beach.

=== The Final Break ===
After the FBI finds out that Michael is going to try and break Sara out of prison they contact Mahone. Mahone is offered his old job back with the FBI if he agrees to give them credible information that leads to proof of Michael's plans. Mahone gives up the blind spot in the cameras that Michael had found, which the FBI fixes and then demands more information from Mahone. Mahone eventually decides not to turn his back on Michael but instead to use the connection to his advantage. Mahone informs the FBI that Michael is going to parachute into the prison, and when a dummy is parachuted into the prison Michael has enough of a distraction to break Sara out. Once Sara has escaped safely, Mahone gives her and Lincoln a tape from Michael that explained why he sacrificed himself for Sara.

=== Season 5 ===
In July 2016 it was revealed that Fichtner would not be reprising his role as Mahone in the upcoming fifth season. Robert Knepper told Digital Spy that "[writer] Paul Scheuring loves Bill Fichtner and I love Bill Fichtner. He's a brilliant actor – but Paul honestly said to me, 'I don't know what to do with that character'. He didn't want to just bring everybody back, so that the audience go, 'Oh, look, it's Bill Fichtner again!' – he honestly thought, 'I'm not sure where to do that in the plot.' So if someday there's another chapter of this, maybe then Bill will be back. But I think the characters that are there, each of our moments that we have, are key to the storytelling, which is how it should be."

Mahone's absence is somewhat explained in the final episode of the revival; in which Michael Scofield recounts to Theodore Bagwell how their mutual enemy Poseidon had been monitoring Michael's communications with anyone he believed could be a resource or ally. With those individuals, such as Mahone, unavailable; Michael is forced to turn to Bagwell himself for assistance.

== Characteristics ==
Mahone is depicted as an intelligent FBI agent with "an amazingly sharp mind", quickly discovering the secret of Michael's tattoos and his plans. His thoroughness and investigational skills allow him to extrapolate the fugitives' location, causing Michael to remark, "It's like he knows where we're going, what we're thinking." Mahone has been described as "intellectually matched with Scofield", mainly in his ability to analyze and interpret his surroundings. Craig Blanchard of The San Diego Union-Tribune describes Michael as the "brains of the operation" and Mahone as his "arch-nemesis, sort of his equal on the other side of the law." Michael and Mahone have been described as "two sides of the same brilliant coin"; however, Mahone notes, "there's one big difference between you and I (sic), Michael. And you just proved it. You can't kill. And that's what it's gonna take to stop me. Because I don't have the same reservations. I can." His willingness to commit murder in order to preserve his life is shown when Michael asks if he would kill two innocent men to "get his life back", to which he replies "Absolutely." Fichtner defends Mahone by saying that he "doesn't do everything he does because he wants to do it. He's not OK about it. It's going to start to come out."

Mahone is not a straightforward character, and his past is revealed as the series progresses. According to series creator Paul Scheuring, the writers try to let all the characters in the show "inhabit a gray area." Scheuring says that although Mahone's pursuit in the second season is very noble, "there are some things about him that we will learn that are slightly less than noble." Fichtner tries to play the character with a soft side, and believes that those characterizing him as "a hard guy" are "missing what I'm trying to do." Regarding the frequent intake of pills by Mahone, the series' executive producer and writer Matt Olmstead says:

Mahone has certain things in his past, as far as what he's done in the service of his country, things he's done around the world—he's starting to hear footsteps from all of that. It doesn't throw him off his game at all but the sum total of his life does begin to present itself.

Mahone's anxiety is evident when he reaches for the varatril pills hidden inside his pen. When Mahone runs out of pills, he is tense and easily agitated. Fichtner notes the erratic behavior of his character, commenting, "The more twisted the better! Who wants to play a straight-away FBI guy?" He says that the actions that Mahone takes are affected by "some of the things that Mahone has in the back of his closet—and in the back of his mind, the voices he is hearing about his own life." Andy Dehnart of MSNBC observes that Mahone, "as played by William Fichtner, always seemed to be on the edge of a nervous breakdown."

Although not a major characteristic, Mahone is depicted as remarkably good at unarmed combat (probably due to his military background). It is surprising when Lincoln attempts to kill him, he rapidly masters him and tries to choke him; Lincoln only manages to master him by squeezing his previous gunshot wound, only to be overcome again and have Mahone's gun on him. When one of Lechero's men attempts to stab Michael at the beginning of season three, Mahone stops him and breaks his neck in seconds. He is also the only one T-Bag believed could kill Sammy, but when the tunnel crumbles on top of Sammy Mahone rapidly masters his men. In season four when Christina Rose orders her bodyguard to kill Mahone, he beats both of them down within seconds.

== Development ==
The character of Mahone was not in the original plan of the Prison Break staff writers for the second season. When the writers approached the Fox network with their plans for the second season, Fox Entertainment president Peter Liguori suggested including a fugitive pursuer who was "not corrupt"; a character who is "like the Tommy Lee Jones character in The Fugitive." Along with Paul Kellerman and Brad Bellick, Mahone became a fugitive hunter at the start of the second season. The writers were aware of the increasing number of antagonists in the show, which led Olmstead to remark, "If there are too many people pursuing them, [the pursuers] are rendered inept because they're not all catching our convicts, and you can only have so many close calls." The writers decided that the character of Mahone was to be a "very formidable" nemesis for the protagonists, and the "flip side of Michael Scofield." Scheuring acknowledges comparisons made between Mahone and Les Misérables' character, Inspector Javert, "He certainly is Javert to Michael's Valjean, but you can express it however you want. He's his nemesis." One of the tricks used by the Prison Break writers is to constantly shift the sympathetic characters. Olmstead notes, "A white-hat character can be kind of boring." Fichtner does not believe that Mahone is a "bad guy"; rather, he has "a lot of demons driving him."

The bottom line is, if I didn't really have a good time doing it, I wouldn't have come back for one more year.

— William Fichtner on his return in the fourth season

Fichtner was cast as Alexander Mahone one day before filming began for the second season. After acting the previous year in the series Invasion, Fichtner did not intend to return to network television. When approached with the scripts for the first two episodes of the second season Fichtner was uncertain of his character's background, but attracted to "the potential of who this guy is." Fichtner was given two days to decide whether he wanted to play the character and, although he was unsure if the experience would be worthwhile, he later said that he was glad to have accepted the role. Fichtner has praised the quality of writing on the series, saying "Television shows live or die on writing. The joy of Prison Break has been the writers. They're great and they forever challenged me, which makes the journey worth it." Fichtner has also had several concerns with the scripts written for him, and talks to the writers to make sure that the character stays consistent. On at least one occasion, he has sat down with the writer and tweaked the entire script.

Fichtner said that his role on Prison Break ended up being "a lot longer" than he had originally thought. He was signed on to appear for a further two seasons, after being convinced by Olmstead to appear in a fourth (and final) one. The series' move from Dallas to Los Angeles for filming was also an inducement for Fichtner, who previously had to leave his family for filming. When Olmstead asked Fichtner to return for the fourth season, his only request was to make it challenging by making his character's journey difficult. Fichtner believes that in Mahone's journey, "All of a sudden the blinders went up... And little by little, he's trying to make his way back." He thinks that his character's journey should end with "something really out of the blue": "What if he totally loses it?"

== Reception ==
Mahone is often referred to by critics as Michael's nemesis. Rob Owen of the Pittsburgh Post-Gazette found Mahone to be "a far more worthy adversary for Michael than prison guard Brad Bellick... who's still after the convicts but seems like a cartoon compared to the Inspector Javert-like Mahone." Jeff Comings of the Arizona Daily Star comments that "William Fichtner is going to be the best actor on any show this season. He's brooding, sexy, enigmatic and a little scary as the FBI man waiting for the clan to cross state lines and make this a federal case. Add in the reliance on those pills he's hiding in that pen and I think I smell Emmy!" Brian Zoromski of IGN believes that the "strongest portions of 'Manhunt' deal with the introduction of a new character, an FBI agent named Alexander Mahone, played by the great character actor William Fichtner."

Digital Spy's Ben Rawson-Jones praised the "wonderful" Fichtner, claiming he "quickly became more appealing than the brooding hero himself," however, he did not enjoy Mahone's storyline in the third season. Rawson-Jones felt that Mahone had turned into a "gibbering, sweating wreck most of the time", with only "occasional glimpses" of his brilliance. Robert Bianco of USA Today said that although Fichtner was a welcome addition to the cast, he could not compensate for the "harebrained absurdities that have swamped this show." Dehnart called Mahone the best new character of the second season, but remarked that his ability to move from various locations in a short amount of time made him seem to possess "the power of super fast transportation."
