= Leon Russom =

American actor

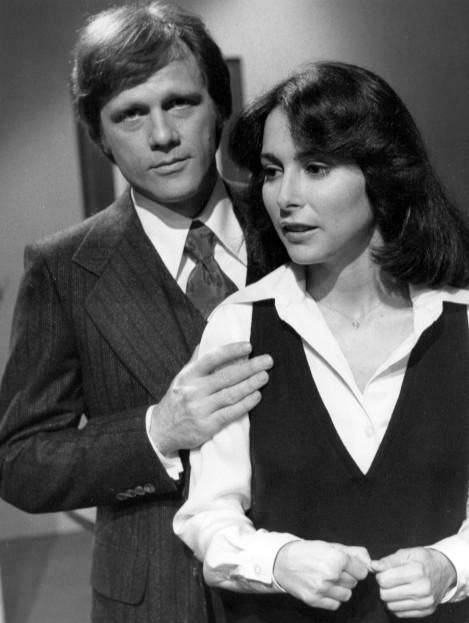
- Russom as Willis Frame and Toni Kalem as Angie Perrini in Another World, 1976.
- Occupation: Actor

Leon Russom is an American actor. He appeared in numerous television series, particularly soap operas. He portrayed Admiral Toddman (in the Star Trek: Deep Space Nine episode "The Die is Cast") and the Starfleet Commander-in-Chief in Star Trek VI: The Undiscovered Country. In his later years, he has appeared in shows such as X-Files, Bones, Jericho, Prison Break, and Cold Case. Russom worked with the Coen brothers twice, playing smaller parts in The Big Lebowski (1998) and True Grit (2010), as well appearing in John Krasinski's A Quiet Place (2018).

== Early career ==
Russom was in the original cast of the 1969 Off-Broadway show Oh! Calcutta!. His first television acting work was on the CBS soap opera Guiding Light in the late 1960s. He subsequently appeared in another CBS soap opera Love is a Many Splendored Thing as Joe Taylor from 1972 to 1973. Russom was the second actor to play the role of Willis Frame on the NBC soap Another World, a role that he kept for several years. His early film career included The Trial of the Catonsville Nine as David Durst and Stephen King's Silver Bullet. He also appeared on the TV show Mission: Impossible as Sam Evans.

== Later work ==
Russom's later work included many appearances in dramas, mainly legal or crime. He appeared in many TV shows in the 1990s and the early 2000s, including L.A. Law, Bones, Cold Case, Law & Order, JAG, NYPD Blue, John Doe, The X-Files, Dark Skies, Seinfeld and other shows. He played the police chief of Malibu in the Coen brothers' The Big Lebowski (1998). He appeared in Prison Break as General Jonathan Krantz, head of The Company.

Russom is also a stage actor, and in 2012, he was nominated for an LA Weekly Theater Award for his portrayal of Hamm in Samuel Beckett's Endgame at Los Angeles' Sacred Fools Theater Company, where he served as a co-artistic director for the company's sixteenth season, alongside fellow company members French Stewart and Alyssa Preston. In 2013, he appeared as the Earl of Gloucester in King Lear with The Porters of Hellsgate, alongside Larry Cedar as King Lear. In 2018, he appeared in John Krasinski's horror film, A Quiet Place.

== Filmography ==
=== Film ===
Leon Russom film credits
Year	Title	Role
1972	The Trial of the Catonsville Nine	David Darst
1985	Silver Bullet	Bob Coslaw
1987	Hotshot	Coach
1987	No Way Out	Kevin O'Brien
1988	The Rescue	Captain Miller
1988	Fresh Horses	Kyle Larkin
1991	He Said, She Said	Harry
1991	Star Trek VI: The Undiscovered Country	Chief-in-Command
1993	The Adventures of Huck Finn	Shanty Lady's Husband
1994	Double Dragon	Chief Delario
1995	Goldilocks and the Three Bears	Joshua Crane
1996	The Phantom	Mayor Krebs
1996	Reasons of the Heart	Drew Hadley
1998	The Big Lebowski	Malibu Police Chief
2000	Men of Honor	Decker
2000	A Visit from the Sergeant Major with Unintended Consequences	Mr. White
2000	Ascension	Old Man
2001	Behind Enemy Lines	Ed Burnett
2003	Buttleman	Reverend Buttleman
2010	True Grit	Sheriff
2012	Fuzz Track City	Victor Swick
2013	Lost on Purpose	Gene Lee
2016	The Binding	Uriel
2016	The Midnighters	Victor
2017	Bethany	Doctor Merman
2017	The Fuzz	Victor Swick
2018	A Quiet Place	Man in the woods
2023	The Primevals	Rondo Montana

=== Television ===
Leon Russom television credits
Year	Title	Role	Notes
1969	Guiding Light	Peter Wexler	1 episode
1971	Mission: Impossible	Sam Evans	Episode: "The Miracle" (S6.E5)
1972–1973	Love is a Many Splendored Thing	Joe Taylor	248 episodes
1975	Kojak	Gallen	1 episode
1978–1980	Another World	Willis Frame	272 episodes
1987	The Equalizer	Sergeant Worley	Episode: "Solo"
1988	The Equalizer	Lieutenant Borley	Episode: "Something Green"
1993	L.A. Law	Matthew Wilton	1 episode
1993	Law & Order	Gordon Bryce	Episode: "Benevolence"
1993	The X-Files	Detective Miles	Episode: Pilot
1995	NYPD Blue	William Crawford	1 episode
1995	Seinfeld	Clayton	Episode: "The Hot Tub"
1995	Star Trek: Deep Space Nine	Vice Admiral Toddman	Episode: "The Die is Cast"
1996	Nowhere Man	Dr. John Shayzin	Episode: "Forever Jung"
1996	Dark Skies	Admiral Roscoe Hillenkoetter	1 episode
1997	JAG	Captain Gayle Osbourne	Episodes: "Secrets" & "Ghosts"
1998	The Magnificent Seven	Mr. Wheeler	1 episode
1999	Diagnosis: Murder	Claude Campbell	1 episode
2000	The Practice	Brian Kerns	2 episodes
2000	The X-Files	Detective Miles	Episode: "Requiem"
2002	JAG	Lt. General Anthony Manzarek	Episode: "Ready or Not"
2002	John Doe	Lorne Barker	1 episode
2002	The West Wing	Network News President	1 episode
2004	NYPD Blue	Larry Praegitzer	1 episode
2005	Alias	James Lehman	1 episode
2006	Cold Case	Owen Murphy	1 episode
2006–2008	Jericho	Sheriff	2 episodes
2006-2009	Prison Break	General Jonathan Krantz	30 episodes
2007	Bones	Archbishop Stephen Wallace	1 episode
2007	Boston Legal	Colonel George Hegarty	1 episode
2019	Shameless (American TV series)	Chester	1 episode
