= Chicago Fire season 14 =

Chicago Fire
- Season 14
- Release poster
- Showrunner: Andrea Newman
- Starring: Taylor Kinney; David Eigenberg; Joe Minoso; Christian Stolte; Miranda Rae Mayo; Daniel Kyri; Hanako Greensmith; Jocelyn Hudon; Brandon Larracuente; Dermot Mulroney
- No. of episodes: 21

Release
- Original network: NBC
- Original release: October 1, 2025 – May 13, 2026

Season chronology
- ← Previous; Season 13 Next → Season 15

The fourteenth season of Chicago Fire, an American drama television series with executive producer Dick Wolf, and producers Derek Haas and Matt Olmstead, was ordered on May 6, 2025, and premiered on October 1, 2025. The season concluded on May 13, 2026, and consisted of 21 episodes. This season marks the final for show runner Andrea Newman who is set to depart after the season concludes and that executive producer Victor Teran would be promoted to show runner for the fifteenth season.

== Cast and characters ==
=== Main ===
- Taylor Kinney as Lieutenant Kelly Severide, Squad Company 3
- David Eigenberg as Firefighter Christopher Herrmann, Truck Company 81
- Joe Minoso as Firefighter Joe Cruz, Squad Company 3
- Christian Stolte as Lieutenant Randall "Mouch" McHolland, Engine Company 51
- Miranda Rae Mayo as Lieutenant Stella Kidd, Truck Company 81
- Daniel Kyri as Firefighter Darren Ritter, Truck Company 81 (episodes 1–2)
- Hanako Greensmith as Paramedic in Charge Violet Mikami, Ambulance Unit 61
- Jocelyn Hudon as Paramedic Lizzie Novak, Ambulance Unit 61
- Brandon Larracuente as Firefighter Sal Vasquez, Truck Company 81
- Dermot Mulroney as Battalion Chief Dom Pascal, District 4

=== Recurring ===
- Randy Flagler as Firefighter Harold Capp, Squad 3
- Anthony Ferraris as Firefighter Tony Ferraris, Squad 3
- Robyn Coffin as Cindy Herrmann
- Tim Hopper as Captain Tom Van Meter
- Leroy S. Williams III as Firefighter Ballard, Truck 81
- Kristen Gutoskie as Chloe Cruz

=== Special guest stars ===
- Jake Lockett as Firefighter Sam Carver
- Jesse Lee Soffer as Jay Halstead
- Tracy Spiridakos as Hailey Upton

=== Crossover characters ===
- S. Epatha Merkerson as Sharon Goodwin, executive director of Patient and Medical Services at Gaffney Chicago Medical Center
- Steven Weber as Dr. Dean Archer, Attending Physician and Board certified in Trauma Surgery
- Darren Barnet as Dr. John Frost, Emergency Pediatrics resident and former television actor

== Episodes ==
No. overall	No. in season	Title	Directed by	Written by	Original airdate	Prod. code	U.S. viewers (millions)
275	1	"Kicking Down Doors"	Reza Tabrizi	Andrea Newman & Alec Wells	October 1, 2025	1401	5.34
Firehouse 51 welcomes new recruit Sal Vasquez who immediately begins defying Stella's orders on truck. Meanwhile, Stella learns that her pregnancy turned out to be false leaving her devastated. Newly promoted lieutenant Mouch struggles with filling out paperwork and privacy when Hermann struggles to give up the officers quarters. Also, Violet looks into why 911 calls are being dismissed or ignored.
276	2	"Primary Search"	Matt Earl Beesley	Matt Whitney	October 8, 2025	1402	4.79
Violet and Novak look into a series of calls when patients are turning up with stab wounds in the same place. Meanwhile, Vasquez tries to prove himself at 51 following his first call to an icy reception. Also, Ritter considers moving to New York following his reunion with Dwayne.
277	3	"In the Blood"	Lisa Robinson	Victor Teran	October 15, 2025	1403	5.14
Pascal takes matters into his own hands when the budget for the CFD continues to be slashed. Meanwhile, Violet and Novak look into a solution following a call of an overturned ambulance which lead to a contribution to being overworked. Also, Stella continues to struggle with Isaiah.
278	4	"Mercy"	Reza Tabrizi	Alec Wells	October 22, 2025	1404	5.24
Firehouse 51 rally together to help Herrmann after responding to a call of his house burning down. Later on, Herrmann begins to think that it might be his fault for causing the fire. Meanwhile, Severide continues to bond with Isaiah while Stella continues to find a thing to bond with him. Also, Violet and Novak begin their paramedic pilot program by training with Capp first.
279	5	"Ghosts"	Lisa Demaine	Davon Briggs	October 29, 2025	1405	4.95
With chief Pascal still out, Severide remains in charge of 51. The team is called to a fire at an apartment building where Cruz is convinced he met a man who later turns out to be dead. 51 later investigate a warehouse fire which contains a gas leak causing Kidd to pass out. Meanwhile, Mouch organises a "pass the boot" for Hermann at Molly's much to Hermann's disgust.
280	6	"Broken Things"	Avi Youabian	Matt Whitney & Julia Keimach	November 5, 2025	1406	5.01
Violet and Novak are forced to call for help when they are stuck in dead still traffic when transporting a patient in critical condition. Meanwhile, Stella continues to help Isaiah with finding his mother a long term care facility. Severide works with Pascal in the city. Also, Vasquez receives new information about his dad’s case with trying to grant parole.
281	7	"Pierce the Vein"	William Eichler	Victor Teran	November 12, 2025	1407	5.11
Severide and the OFI work together to investigate a fire at a school that deemed suspicious after it was revealed that it was intentionally set near the school’s principals office. Meanwhile, Violet works with Vasquez on ambulance while Novak is dealt with an emergency involving her estranged sister. Also, Pascal learns that the city’s budget is looking to decommission rigs and one is Mouch’s rig. The episode ends with the mystery arsonist starting a fire to the apartment with Severide, Captain Van Meter, and the principal inside unaware of what has happened.
282	8	"A Man Possessed"	Reza Tabrizi	Alec Wells	January 7, 2026	1408	N/A
Severide, Tom and the Principal barely escape from the apartment engulfed in flames, but Tom is rushed to the ED after he suffered third-degree burns on his body.
283	9	"Crime of Passion"	Steve Robin	Teleplay by : Alec Wells; Story by : Matt Whitney	January 14, 2026	1409	N/A
Still reeling from Van Meter's condition, Severide, with assisance from Cruz, were able to discover a 20-year-old arson case that may be linked to the fire at the principal's house. Meanwhile, 51 bands together to salvage Mouch's job, but their efforts only result in Mouch being forced to transfer to Firehouse 44. Also, Severide and Kidd are forced to let Isaiah go, after his mother requests that he lives with a family friend during her recovery, so Isaiah can be close.
284	10	"Carry a Torch"	Sheelin Choksey	Andrea Newman & Davon Briggs	January 21, 2026	1410	N/A
Vazquez finds himself dragged into his father's incriminating issues, after a couple of thugs break into his apartment. Novak hooks up with Pediatric Dr. John Frost. Herrmann feels the strain of Mouch's absence at the firehouse. Severeide and Kidd are forced to confront their familial problems after Van Meter wakes up.
285	11	"Frostbite Blue"	Chris DeAngelis	Hussain Pirani	January 28, 2026	1411	N/A
51 is faced with legal issues after responding to a call, when the attorney who owned a billboard at the site of the rescue demands a report of the incident. Meanwhile, Violet's romantic life becomes complicated with the return of an old flame.
286	12	"Coming in Hot"	Lisa Demaine	Victor Teran	February 4, 2026	1412	N/A
Pascal is faced with old demons with Deputy District Chief Cranston, after Tony gets injured when responding to a call. Meanwhile, Hermann enlists the help of Violet when his daughter Annabelle begins to have nightmares following the trauma of the family losing their home. Also, Novak and Frost decide to end their relationship after realizing that they're not after the same thing. On the day of Pascal's hearing, Deputy Cranston dies of a heart attack, but not before managing to clear Pascal's name, after the latter insists he investigate the building fire a second time.
287	13	"Reckoning, Part I"	Reza Tabrizi	Victor Teran	March 4, 2026	1415	N/A
Firehouse 51 is called to an emergency when an airplane is not responding to control tower. When the airplane lands safely, they are shocked to discover the passengers onboard the airplane have passed out from some chemical exposure. One of the survivors who is pregnant is taken to Chicago Med. Note: This episode begins a crossover event that continues on Chicago Med season 11 episode 13 and concludes on Chicago P.D. season 13 episode 13.
288	14	"Hit and Run"	Anthony Nardolillo	Alec Wells	March 11, 2026	1413	N/A
While on a call, a white box truck hits Truck 81 with its ladder raised up with Stella on it, causing her to fall and hanging on to a wire. The team scramble and were able to save her on time. Severide, who almost lost Stella, wants to find the truck driver responsible for this. At night, Truck 81 is called to the scene of an accident and find the same truck that was responsible for hitting Truck 81 earlier.
289	15	"Do Not Resuscitate"	Sheelin Choksey	Matt Whitney	March 18, 2026	1414	N/A
Truck 81 is dispatched when a car loses control and crashed into the wet cement. While getting the driver out, Vazquez notices some foot prints and Stella questions the driver. Later Ambulance 61 is called to a person who stopped breathing. However the patient has a DNR, but Violet and Novak use the defibrator and take him to Chicago Med.
290	16	"Firehouse 66"	Paul McCrane	Hussain Pirani	April 1, 2026	1416	N/A
Severide clashes with the new chief. Cruz meanwhile sees his son’s history on his computer and learns that he wants to go to Honduras.
291	17	"Sway"	Matt Earl Beesley	Natalie Bartlett	April 8, 2026	1417	N/A
Truck 81 is dispatched when a clinic goes up in flames. Stella gets an anonymous call that the fire was not an accident and someone intentionally set the place up on fire. Elsewhere, Capp and Tony argue over a game of mahjong.
292	18	"Instinct"	Reza Tabrizi	Alec Wells	April 22, 2026	1418	N/A
Violet and Novak are called by a person in distress who needs help with the person who is in labor. They learn it's a trap and are forced by the abuser to help the person who is about to go into labor. Elsewhere, Vasquez notices that Violet and Novak have been gone for a long time and investigates this himself.
293	19	"Exit Point"	William Eichler	Matt Whitney	April 29, 2026	1419	N/A
Severide is faced with dereliction of duty after Hopkins files a complaint against him. Meanwhile, Mouch decides to write a memoir about his life as a firefighter.
294	20	"Speak of the Devil"	Steve Robin	Victor Teran	May 6, 2026	1420	N/A
Firehouse 51 gets called to an accident involving two trucks standing on top of each other. Meanwhile Severide looks through the files on his father and learns about the truth. Chief Hopkins calls out his partner for stealing a box that contained valuable items before the sprinkler system was triggered. This causes Hopkins to leave Firehouse 51 and Severide has a choice: Get promoted to OFI or stay at Firehouse 51.
295	21	"Thank You"	Reza Tabrizi	Andrea Newman	May 13, 2026	1421	N/A
Severide gets promoted as Captain of Firehouse 51. Cruz and Chloe head to Chicago Med and learn that Chloe is pregnant with twin daughters. Hermann and Cindy decide to renew their vows and get remarried at Molly's. Severide and Stella get an unexpected surprise. As Van Meter asks Severide what he is going to do next after being promoted, Firehouse 51 gets called to a building fire. As the smoke gets thicker and soon turns from gray to black, the building collapses on Severide, Mouch, and Squad 3 below and fire rises from above, engulfing Stella, Hermann, and the rest of Truck 81 in flames.

== Production ==
=== Casting ===
Jake Lockett and Daniel Kyri's exits from the series, due to budget cuts, were announced after Season 13 had aired. Kyri returned for the first two episodes of this season to wrap up his storyline while Lockett's exit was off-screen.Lockett made a surprise appearance in”Frostbite Blue”.

It was announced on June 25, 2025, that Brandon Larracuente would be joining the series as Sal Vasquez. His character first appeared during the season premiere.

Dermot Mulroney was announced that he was taking a break from the series after its 14th episode, with a possibility of coming back before the season ends. Rob Morgan was confirmed to be playing a replacement Battalion Chief on a recurring basis, appearing in at least four episodes including the season finale.

=== Crossover ===
A new three part crososver between Chicago Fire and its two sister shows Chicago P.D. and Chicago Med was announced on January 21, 2026. The episodes will form the 13th episodes of the season for each show, and they aired on March 4, 2026.

== Ratings ==
Viewership and ratings per episode of Chicago Fire season 14
No.	Title	Air date	Rating (18–49)	Viewers (millions)	DVR (18–49)	DVR viewers (millions)	Total (18–49)	Total viewers (millions)	Ref.
1	"Kicking Down Doors"	October 1, 2025	0.4	5.34	0.2	1.99	0.6	7.33	
2	"Primary Search"	October 8, 2025	0.3	4.79	0.1	1.91	0.4	6.70	
3	"In the Blood"	October 15, 2025	0.4	5.14	0.2	2.02	0.6	7.16	
4	"Mercy"	October 22, 2025	0.4	5.24	0.5	1.89	0.5	7.14	
5	"Ghosts"	October 29, 2025	0.3	4.95	0.2	1.94	0.5	6.90	
6	"Broken Things"	November 5, 2025	0.4	5.01	0.1	1.86	0.5	6.89	
7	"Pierce the Vein"	November 12, 2025	0.3	5.11	—N/a	—N/a	—N/a	—N/a	
