= Chicago Fire season 15 =

Chicago Fire
- Season 15
- Showrunner: Victor Teran
- Starring: Taylor Kinney; David Eigenberg; Joe Minoso; Christian Stolte; Miranda Rae Mayo; Hanako Greensmith; Jocelyn Hudon; Brandon Larracuente; Dermot Mulroney; Da'Vinchi
- No. of episodes: 7

Release
- Original network: NBC
- Original release: October 7, 2026 – present

Season chronology
- ← Previous; Season 14

The fifteenth season of Chicago Fire, an American drama television series with the executive producer Dick Wolf, and also producers Derek Haas and Matt Olmstead, was ordered on March 27, 2026 and began airing on October 7, 2026. It will be the first season with new showrunner Victor Teran.

== Cast and characters ==
=== Main ===
- Taylor Kinney as Captain Kelly Severide, Squad Company 3
- David Eigenberg as Firefighter Christopher Herrmann, Truck Company 81
- Joe Minoso as Firefighter Joe Cruz, Squad Company 3 (Episodes 1-5)
- Christian Stolte as Lieutenant Randall "Mouch" McHolland, Engine Company 51
- Miranda Rae Mayo as Lieutenant Stella Kidd, Truck Company 81
- Hanako Greensmith as Paramedic in Charge Violet Mikami, Ambulance Unit 61
- Jocelyn Hudon as Paramedic Lizzie Novak, Ambulance Unit 61
- Brandon Larracuente as Firefighter Sal Vasquez, Truck Company 81
- Dermot Mulroney as Battalion Chief Dom Pascal, District 4 (Episode 1)
- Da'Vinchi as Firefighter Marcus Burke

=== Recurring ===
- Randy Flagler as Firefighter Harold Capp, Squad 3
- Anthony Ferraris as Firefighter Tony Ferraris, Squad 3
- Leroy S. Williams III as Firefighter Ballard, Truck 81
- Matthew Daddario as Firefighter Candidate McCaffrey
- Kristen Gutoskie as Chloe Cruz
- Carlos Miranda as Jacob Morales

== Episodes ==
No. overall	No. in season	Title	Directed by	Written by	Original airdate	Prod. code	U.S. viewers (millions)
296	1	"New Blood"	Reza Tabrizi	Victor Teran	October 7, 2026	1501	5.13
3 months have passed since the warehouse fire, everyone survives but two victims were killed in the fire. Joe Cruz suffers a spinal cord injury where he may not be able to walk again.
297	2	"Rattle the Cage"	Lisa Demaine	Desta Tedros Reff	October 14, 2026	1502	5.24
298	3	"Take the Hit"	Paul McCrane	Hussain Pirani	October 21, 2026	1503	4.72
299	4	"A Perfect Arson"	Steve Robin	Alec Wells	October 28, 2026	1504	4.63
300	5	"Three Hundred"	Reza Tabrizi	Matt Whitney	November 4, 2026	1505	5.36
301	6	"Over the Edge"	Lisa Robinson	Christina Nieves	November 11, 2026	1506	5.34
302	7	"No Love Lost"	John Fortenberry	Amelia Swedeen	November 18, 2026	1507	4.53

== Production ==
=== Casting ===
Taylor Kinney and Miranda Rae Mayo both signed new deals in May 2026 with other cast members expected to sign on at a later date. It was announced in July 2026 that both Joe Minoso and Dermot Mulroney would be leaving the show. Mulroney departed in the first episode, and Minoso is expected to depart in the 5th episode (the series' 300th episode).

Da'Vinchi was confirmed to be joining the cast as Firefighter Marcus Burke on July 23, 2026. Matthew Daddario was also announced to be joining the cast in a recurring role as a new firefighter candidate.

=== Behind the Scenes ===
Victor Teran became the new showrunner from this season, following previous showrunner Andrea Newman who stepped down at the end of the previous season. The series will also mark its 300th episode this season, with the return of characters not seen in “a little while”.

== Ratings ==
Viewership and ratings per episode of Chicago Fire season 15
No.	Title	Air date	Rating (18–49)	Viewers (millions)	DVR (18–49)	DVR viewers (millions)	Total (18–49)	Total viewers (millions)	Ref.
1	"New Blood"	October 7, 2026	0.4	5.13	TBD	TBD	TBD	TBD	
2	"Rattle the Cage"	October 14, 2026	0.3	5.24	TBD	TBD	TBD	TBD	
3	"Take the Hit"	October 21, 2026	0.3	4.72	TBD	TBD	TBD	TBD	
4	"A Perfect Arson"	October 28, 2026	0.2	4.63	TBD	TBD	TBD	TBD	
5	"Three Hundred"	November 4, 2026	0.3	5.36	TBD	TBD	TBD	TBD	
