= Chicago Fire season 11 =

Chicago Fire
- Season 11
- Showrunners: Derek Haas; Andrea Newman
- Starring: Taylor Kinney; Kara Killmer; David Eigenberg; Joe Minoso; Christian Stolte; Miranda Rae Mayo; Alberto Rosende; Daniel Kyri; Hanako Greensmith; Eamonn Walker
- No. of episodes: 22

Release
- Original network: NBC
- Original release: September 21, 2022 – May 24, 2023

Season chronology
- ← Previous; Season 10 Next → Season 12

The eleventh season of Chicago Fire, an American drama television series with executive producer Dick Wolf, and producers Derek Haas and Matt Olmstead, was ordered on February 27, 2020, by NBC. The season premiered on September 21, 2022. The season concluded on May 24, 2023 and contained 22 episodes.

== Cast and characters ==
=== Main ===
- Taylor Kinney as Lieutenant Kelly Severide, Squad Company 3 (Note: Taylor Kinney was dealing with a “personal matter” and is absent for parts of the season).
- Kara Killmer as Paramedic in Charge Sylvie Brett, Ambulance 61
- David Eigenberg as Lieutenant Christopher Herrmann, Engine Company 51
- Joe Minoso as Firefighter Joe Cruz, Squad Company 3
- Christian Stolte as Firefighter Randall "Mouch" McHolland, Truck Company 81
- Miranda Rae Mayo as Lieutenant Stella Kidd, Truck Company 81
- Alberto Rosende as Firefighter Blake Gallo, Truck Company 81
- Daniel Kyri as Firefighter Darren Ritter, Engine Company 51
- Hanako Greensmith as Paramedic Violet Mikami, Ambulance 61
- Eamonn Walker as Deputy District Chief Wallace Boden

=== Recurring ===
- Randy Flagler as Firefighter Harold Capp, Squad Company 3
- Anthony Ferraris as Firefighter Tony Ferraris, Squad Company 3
- Jake Lockett as Firefighter Sam Carver, Truck Company 81
- Robyn Coffin as Cindy Herrmann
- Teddy Sears as Kyle Sheffield, Former CFD Chaplin
- Jimmy Nicholas as Paramedic Chief Evan Hawkins
- Caitlin Carver as Emma Jacobs, Paramedic and later an IAD Investigator before getting fired
- Kristen Gutoskie as Chloe Cruz
- Carlos S. Sanchez as Javier Cruz, Joe’s adopted son
- Andy Allo as Lieutenant Wendy Seager, OFI
- Katelynn Shennett as Kylie Estevez

=== Special guest stars ===
- Jesse Spencer as Captain Matthew Casey

=== Crossover characters ===
- Tracy Spiridakos as Detective Hailey Upton
- Amy Morton as Desk Sergeant Trudy Platt
- Nick Gehlfuss as Dr. Will Halstead
- Jessy Schram as Dr. Hannah Asher
- S. Epatha Merkerson as Sharon Goodwin
- Oliver Platt as Dr. Daniel Charles

== Episodes ==
No. overall	No. in season	Title	Directed by	Written by	Original release date	Prod. code	U.S. viewers (millions)
218	1	"Hold on Tight"	Reza Tabrizi	Andrea Newman & Michael Gilvary	September 21, 2022	1101	6.75
Kidd and Severide's honeymoon at their cabin is interrupted by a dangerous person from their past, who nearly kills them. Afterwards, Severide’s and Prima’s relationship becomes strained. Sam Carver, Kidd's former academy classmate joins Kidds’ crew at Firehouse 51. Brett and Violet reflect on their relationships with Casey and Hawkins, respectively. Violet reaches out to Hawkins when she learns from Gallo that Hawkins went to bat for her with DC Hill.
219	2	"Every Scar Tells a Story"	Brenna Malloy	Matt Whitney	September 28, 2022	1102	6.76
Javi spends a couple of shifts at Firehouse 51. Kidd and Carver work together to help Carver's former boss. As Hawkins and Violet's relationship blossoms, Gallo turns his attention elsewhere.
220	3	"Completely Shattered"	Matt Earl Beesley	Derek Haas	October 5, 2022	1103	7.35
Kidd recruits Carver, Capp and Tony to help prepare her new lieutenant's quarters. Severide and Detective Pryma reluctantly pair up to work a police investigation. Firehouse 51 comes together to fight a movie theater fire. Violet breaks down in tears after the team is unable to save Paramedic Field Chief Evan Hawkins.
221	4	"The Center of the Universe"	Stephen Cragg	Andrea Newman & Michael Gilvary	October 12, 2022	1104	7.16
Kidd gets a glimpse into Carver's chaotic personal life and Mouch and Hermann receive an unexpected gift.
222	5	"Haunted House"	Reza Tabrizi	Victor Teran	October 19, 2022	1105	7.03
Firehouse 51 hosts a Halloween open house. Kidd and Severide help a young girl after she gets kicked out of her home.
223	6	"All-Out Mystery"	Brenna Malloy	Andrea Newman & Michael Gilvary	November 2, 2022	1106	6.56
Severide and Kidd investigate an explosion at a jewelry store. Cruz and Chloe take steps to make Javi a permanent part of their family. Gallo, Ritter and Mouch try to bond with Carver.
224	7	"Angry Is Easier"	Kantu Lentz	Elizabeth Sherman	November 9, 2022	1107	6.19
Herrmann is tasked with fulfilling a man's dying wish. Kidd reflects on her Girls on Fire program after one of her students graduates from the Fire Academy. A heckler harasses Firehouse 51.
225	8	"A Beautiful Life"	Lisa Robinson	Teleplay by : Andrea Newman & Michael Gilvary; Story by : Ashley Cooper	November 16, 2022	1108	6.90
Detective Pryma asks for Severide's help on a case involving explosives. Gallo and Carver clash after Gallo improvises on a call. Violet encourages Brett to start dating again.
226	9	"Nemesis"	Reza Tabrizi	Victor Teran	December 7, 2022	1109	6.85
Severide struggles with the cost of helping Detective Pryma with the Martucci case. Gallo campaigns for Hermann to represent 51 at the National Firefighter's Association Winter Conference. A familiar face makes a shocking return and it’s not who 51 expected. Violet confronts the unexpected guest and learns exactly who she is.
227	10	"Something For the Pain"	Matt Earl Beesley	Matt Whitney	January 4, 2023	1110	7.06
Detective Pryma's case comes to an explosive end with Kidd and Carver's lives in danger. Brett installs an infant safe surrender box at Firehouse 51. Violet is determined to take Emma down. Kidd and Carver’s improving professional relationship is a work in progress.
228	11	"A Guy I Used to Know"	Oscar Rene Lozoya II	Michael Gilvary	January 11, 2023	1111	6.84
Firehouse 51’s preparation for their semi-annual firehouse inspection is thrown a curveball when a different commissioner arrives instead of the usual commissioner. Brett fights to save the funding for her paramedicine program. Hermann begins to fret about Cindy’s chronic cough. Commander Martin Pearce asks Severide to return an owed favor, which entails Kelly conducting a clandestine reinvestigation of Van Meter’s assessment (that Kelly believes should be above suspicion) that a previous fire was accidental. Violet obtains the evidence needed to permanently end Emma’s CFD career.
229	12	"How Does It End?"	Heather Cappiello	Matt Demblowski	January 18, 2023	1112	7.19
Truck and Squad clash after a tense call rescuing a doomsday prepper and Boden gives Severide and Kidd a stern talking to and an ultimatum. Hermann struggles with Cindy's diagnosis and Violet gives Brett and Gallo dating advice.
230	13	"The Man of the Moment"	Matt Earl Beesley	Andrea Newman	February 15, 2023	1113	6.73
Firehouse 51 helps a struggling Hermann put on a school fundraiser as Cindy goes through cancer treatments. Carver's troubled older brother comes to town asking for a huge favor. Later, Carver snaps at Stella. A grateful citizen is determined to thank Brett and Severide monetarily for saving his life from an archery accident.
231	14	"Run Like Hell"	William Eichler	Elizabeth Sherman	February 22, 2023	1114	6.99
Carver spins out after his brother’s visit and his annoying floater replacement takes a romantic interest in Violet. Hermann deals with Cindy’s chemotherapy. On a fire call to an art studio, Ritter catches Don Ramsey, the city treasurer and a powerful local politician, in a compromising position. Mouch and Severide help Trudy with an arson investigation at her friend’s apartment complex. Kidd gives Carver an ultimatum after his encounter with his brother. Severide shows Kidd a mysterious text from Van Meter to close the episode.
232	15	"Damage Control"	Lisa Demaine	Victor Teran	March 1, 2023	1115	6.72
Van Meter’s message turns out to be offer for Severide to enter an arson continuing education program in Alabama, which Kelly accepts. With Severide gone, Kidd, Seager and Carver investigate a suspicious fire at the city stables, where the stable manager died and Gallo was injured by a falling beam. Carver and Seager engage in a clandestine affair. Kylie clashes with some of 51’s firefighters, due to the austerity changes she has instituted (with Chief Boden’s blessings) at the firehouse due to budget cuts. Sylvie and Dylan’s relationship progresses. Hermann continues to struggle to keep it together as Cindy's condition worsens.
233	16	"Acting Up"	Reza Tabrizi	Andrea Newman & Michael Gilvary	March 22, 2023	1116	6.78
With Severide still in Alabama, Cruz feels the burden of his increased responsibilities as he deals with a disruptive new member to squad. Kidd, Gallo and Carver get caught up in the middle of a gang war shoot out while out on a wellness call. Carver is deeply affected when an 8 year boy receives a gun shot wound to the head. A desperate Herrmann wrangles Mouch for Trudy’s help in lifting Cindy's mood. Seager tries to distract Carver to no avail.
234	17	"The First Symptom"	Paul McCrane	Matt Whitney	March 29, 2023	1117	6.84
Kidd informs Chief Boden that her visit with Severide in Alabama was an enjoyable trip. Cruz continues to deal with the disruptive behavior and attitude of Severide’s replacement. After Mouch rescues a significant cache of transfusion blood packets, he continues to build a classical firetruck model for the Deputy District Chief. Soon he needs assistance from Gallo and Ritter securing an authentic replacement part to complete the model. Brett and Violet encounter multiple victims with a puzzling set of concerning symptoms. The results of Cindy's chemotherapy loom ominously over the Hermann family.
235	18	"Danger Is All Around"	Tayo Amos	Elizabeth Sherman	April 5, 2023	1118	6.77
Tony is days away from breaking Rutledge’s (Mouch’s nemesis) CFD's perfect attendance record while Mouch and Capp work to keep him safe. After an absence of many years, Gallo's Aunt Lacey returns to make amends and give him the key to a storage locker filled with old family memories. Casey returns to Firehouse 51 to serve with Kidd on a special task force. Cindy has a party at Molly’s to celebrate the remission of her cancer. Casey reunites with Brett and she has conflicted feelings about her new relationship with Dylan and her past relationship with Casey. Later on, Gallo’s aunt is involved in a serious car accident.
236	19	"Take a Shot at the King"	Stephen Cragg	Ashley Cooper	May 3, 2023	1119	6.11
Gallo finds and rescues his Aunt when she is involved in a brutal car accident, rendering her unconscious and trapped in a flaming car. He then assists and accompanies the paramedics in the ambulance ride to the ER. Meanwhile, the rescue squad responds to an apartment fire and they try to save as many people as they can from the toxic and caustic fumes that engulf the building. Carver collapses and lands in the hospital due to a victim knocking off his mask as he successfully carried her out of the building. Chief Boden clashes with Don Ramsey.
237	20	"Never, Ever Make a Mistake"	Lisa Demaine	Andrea Newman	May 10, 2023	1120	5.95
Engine 51 rescues a homeless man name Shep, who was pinned under an overturned garbage truck. Afterwards, Kidd takes an interest in helping him, but Shep mistakes her compassion for something else. When Carver confronts Shep outside of Kidd’s apartment, Shep physically attacks Carver and they fight. Unfortunately, Carver is then arrested by law enforcement and Kidd watches in disbelief as Carver is taken away in a police car. Herrmann tries meditation to work on his anger issues following Cindy’s experience with cancer, but he is subjected to some pranks at the firehouse. Meanwhile, when on a harrowing call to help Amber, a pregnant 16 year old, Brett and Violet are able to successfully save her baby girl who was born with severe complications, despite the problems caused by first shift not replacing the used OB kit in their call bag. Later, the same baby that Brett and Violet saved, is anonymously left at the firehouse drop box. Kylie takes and passes the firefighter final exams.
238	21	"Change of Plans"	Lisa Robinson	Victor Teran	May 17, 2023	1121	6.02
Stella and Boden bail out Carver, following his arrest. Later, Carver is suspended by IAD as his case goes through the legal system. As matters grow dire for Carver, Kidd manages to help Shep find a placement in a group home and he decides to drop the charges against Carver. Brett hopes to find closure with the abandoned baby when she learns it has been placed in foster care, but later she decides to seek to adopt the baby herself. Capp learns he is not part of Firehouse 51 group chat, and despite the others not being pleased about it, Ritter adds him to it. Cruz learns that Severide is done with his arson training in Alabama and is involved in a big investigation and he informs Stella, who is unaware his training had ended.
239	22	"Red Waterfall"	Reza Tabrizi	Andrea Newman & Michael Gilvary	May 24, 2023	1122	6.09
After Brett travels to Indiana to speak to Amber, she is hoping to receive life changing news. Meanwhile, Firehouse 51 is called to an accident scene involving multiple cars and a boat. According to one witness/victim/driver, another driver fled the scene with a duffle bag and Stella finds a large caliber bullet in the abandoned SUV and alerts Casey. Herrmann is upset by one of the victims he attended to at the scene and later he goes to her psychic parlor. Casey returns once again to follow up on Kidd’s new evidence and also learns that Brett is attempting to adopt Amber’s baby. Later, Violet, Stella and Matt visit Amber to assure her that Brett would be a great mother. Dylan decides to break up with Brett, as realizes they are at different places in their lives. The whole firehouse, responds to a fire at an electrical transformer depot station and become pinned down by sniper fire. In the events that lead to the arrest of one of the shooters, Mouch is wounded during the chaos and is rushed to Chicago Med. Initially Mouch seems fine but later, while Herman is visiting him, he loses consciousness and flatlines. Finally, the season ends with Sylvie learning that Amber will help her adopt the baby and Kylie shares the news with Ritter she’s been accepted into the academy, while Stella tells Carver she leaving town to get Kelly back and Casey proposes marriage to Brett.

== Production ==
=== Taylor Kinney's temporary departure/Return of Jesse Spencer ===
On January 20, 2023, NBC announced that Taylor Kinney who portrays Kelly Severide, would take a leave of absence to focus on a "personal matter." It was later announced that Kinney will not appear in the season finale. Former cast member Jesse Spencer who has portrayed Captain Matthew Casey returned in a guest starring role in Kinney's absence in the episode “Danger is All Around” and returned for the season finale episode “Red Waterfall”.

== Ratings ==
Viewership and ratings per episode of Chicago Fire season 11
No.	Title	Air date	Rating (18–49)	Viewers (millions)	DVR (18–49)	DVR viewers (millions)	Total (18–49)	Total viewers (millions)
1	"Hold on Tight"	September 21, 2022	0.7	6.75	—	—	—	—
2	"Every Scar Tells a Story"	September 28, 2022	0.7	6.76	—	—	—	—
3	"Completely Shattered"	October 5, 2022	0.8	7.35	—	—	—	—
4	"The Center of the Universe"	October 12, 2022	0.7	7.16	—	—	—	—
5	"Haunted House"	October 19, 2022	0.6	7.03	—	—	—	—
6	"All-Out Mystery"	November 2, 2022	0.6	6.56	—	—	—	—
7	"Angry Is Easier"	November 9, 2022	0.6	6.19	—	—	—	—
8	"A Beautiful Life"	November 16, 2022	0.6	6.90	—	—	—	—
9	"Nemesis"	December 7, 2022	0.6	6.85	—	—	—	—
10	"Something For the Pain"	January 4, 2023	0.7	7.06	—	—	—	—
11	"A Guy I Used to Know"	January 11, 2023	0.7	6.84	—	—	—	—
12	"How Does It End?"	January 18, 2023	0.7	7.19	—	—	—	—
13	"The Man of the Moment"	February 15, 2023	0.6	6.73	—	—	—	—
14	"Run Like Hell"	February 22, 2023	0.7	6.99	—	—	—	—
15	"Damage Control"	March 1, 2023	0.7	6.72	—	—	—	—
16	"Acting Up"	March 22, 2023	0.5	6.78	—	—	—	—
17	"The First Symptom"	March 29, 2023	0.6	6.84	—	—	—	—
18	"Danger Is All Around"	April 5, 2023	0.6	6.77	—	—	—	—
19	"Take a Shot at the King"	May 3, 2023	0.6	6.11	—	—	—	—
20	"Never, Ever Make a Mistake"	May 10, 2023	0.4	5.95	—	—	—	—
21	"Change of Plans"	May 17, 2023	0.5	6.02	—	—	—	—
22	"Red Waterfall"	May 24, 2023	0.5	6.09	—	—	—	—
