= Chicago Fire season 10 =

Chicago Fire
- Season 10
- Showrunners: Derek Haas; Andrea Newman
- Starring: Jesse Spencer; Taylor Kinney; Kara Killmer; David Eigenberg; Joe Minoso; Christian Stolte; Miranda Rae Mayo; Alberto Rosende; Daniel Kyri; Hanako Greensmith; Eamonn Walker
- No. of episodes: 22

Release
- Original network: NBC
- Original release: September 22, 2021 – May 25, 2022

Season chronology
- ← Previous; Season 9 Next → Season 11

The tenth season of Chicago Fire, an American drama television series with executive producer Dick Wolf, and producers Derek Haas and Matt Olmstead, was ordered on February 27, 2020, by NBC. The season premiered on September 22, 2021, and contains the series’ 200th episode. In the 200th episode, Matthew Casey left Chicago to move to Oregon. In the season finale, he returned to Chicago for Stella Kidd and Kelly Severide's wedding.

== Cast and characters ==
=== Main ===
- Jesse Spencer as Captain Matthew Casey, Truck Company 81 (episodes 1–5; special guest episode 22)
- Taylor Kinney as Lieutenant Kelly Severide, Squad Company 3
- Kara Killmer as Paramedic in Charge Sylvie Brett, Ambulance 61
- David Eigenberg as Lieutenant Christopher Herrmann, Engine Company 51
- Joe Minoso as Firefighter Joe Cruz, Squad Company 3
- Christian Stolte as Firefighter Randall "Mouch" McHolland, Truck Company 81
- Miranda Rae Mayo as Lieutenant Stella Kidd, Truck Company 81
- Alberto Rosende as Firefighter Blake Gallo, Truck Company 81
- Daniel Kyri as Firefighter Darren Ritter, Engine Company 51
- Hanako Greensmith as Paramedic Violet Mikami, Ambulance 61
- Eamonn Walker as Deputy District Chief Wallace Boden, District 4.

=== Recurring ===
- Randy Flagler as Firefighter Harold Capp, Squad Company 3
- Anthony Ferraris as Firefighter Tony Ferraris, Squad Company 3
- Cameron Scott Roberts as Griffin Darden
- Jimmy Nicholas as Paramedic Field Chief Evan Hawkins
- Brett Dalton as Lieutenant Jason Pelham, Truck Company 81, Truck Company 72 as replacement for Lieutenant Boswell
- Caitlin Carver as Paramedic Emma Jacobs
- Chris Mansa as Firefighter Mason Locke, Truck Company 81
- Katelynn Shennett as Kylie Estevez

=== Crossover characters ===
- Dominic Rains as Dr. Crockett Marcel
- Amy Morton as Desk Sergeant Trudy Platt
- LaRoyce Hawkins as Officer Kevin Atwater
- Tracy Spiridakos as Detective Hailey Upton

== Episodes ==
No. overall	No. in season	Title	Directed by	Written by	Original release date	Prod. code	U.S. viewers (millions)
196	1	"Mayday"	Reza Tabrizi	Andrea Newman & Michael Gilvary	September 22, 2021	1001	7.28
The members of the Rescue Squad narrowly escape a capsized boat while rescuing a victim. Cruz is rushed to the hospital after almost drowning and begins experiencing PTSD. Boden considers a new promotion. Casey and Brett’s romance escalates. Violet, Gallo and Ritter go in on a business venture together.
197	2	"Head Count"	Matt Earl Beesley	Matt Whitney	September 29, 2021	1002	7.36
Casey begins to experience unwanted attention after a video of him rescuing a victim goes viral. Boden makes the decision to take the promotion as the new deputy District chief. Herrmann breaks protocol when it comes to a child victim and he worries that he might get suspended or worse. Ultimately, it is Brett who takes the blame. Mouch sets up a community library at the firehouse. Griffin Darden unexpectedly arrives at the firehouse and Casey sees that something is up.
198	3	"Counting Your Breaths"	Heather Cappiello	Elizabeth Sherman	October 6, 2021	1003	7.18
Severide is forced to bench Cruz when his trauma gets the better of him again. While Griffin Darden is in town, Casey takes him down memory lane, only to learn why Griffin has returned to Chicago. Mouch steps in to help Brett's para-medicine program get off the ground after losing a patient. Gallo, Ritter and Violet struggle to get their home-brewed beer off the ground.
199	4	"The Right Thing"	Stephen Cragg	Andrea Newman & Michael Gilvary	October 13, 2021	1004	7.25
Casey travels to Oregon to visit Griffin only to realize that he and his brother have been living by themselves. Casey takes it upon himself to help them while considering moving to Oregon. Meanwhile, Chief Hawkins goes on a ride along with Brett and Violet after reconsidering her proposal for the EMT. Also, Ritter and his boyfriend get into an altercation with bar goers which leads into a car accident.
200	5	"Two Hundred"	Reza Tabrizi	Derek Haas	October 20, 2021	1005	7.36
Casey makes the life-altering decision to leave Firehouse 51 and move to Oregon to look after the Darden boys. All Members of 51 say their farewells and goodbyes and share hugs with Casey before he leaves. Brett and Mouch launch their new Para-medicine program. Meanwhile, Herrmann is put into a corner when a fire chief uses a past incident to force Molly’s to host a party for his spoiled son. Also, Cruz's baby, Brian, is born and Kylie figures out a way to get Boden back to 51. Note: This is the final regular appearance of Jesse Spencer as Matthew Casey.
201	6	"Dead Zone"	Matt Earl Beesley	Ashley Cooper	October 27, 2021	1006	6.80
Severide begins to look into the recent church fire as a new arson case. The team at Firehouse 51 is put on full alert when a major computer security breach affects the 911 dispatch center and they must act as a makeshift call center. Meanwhile, Brett deals with the fallout from Casey's sudden departure.
202	7	"Whom Shall I Fear?"	Reza Tabrizi	Victor Teran	November 3, 2021	1007	7.00
Firehouse 51 welcomes new Interim Truck Lieutenant, Jason Pelham, but he begins clashing with the team, especially Gallo. Mouch and Herrmann look into why Pelham has not found a permanent firehouse assignment within the past six years. Meanwhile, Severide continues looking into his arson case.
203	8	"What Happened at Whiskey Point?"	Stephen Cragg	Andrea Newman & Michael Gilvary	November 10, 2021	1008	6.63
Boden looks into Pelham's past after considering him to be permanent at 51. Brett and Ritter encourage Violet to confess her true feeling for Gallo which leads to Violet suffering appendicitis. Meanwhile, Gallo's feud with Pelham comes at a crosshairs after Gallo disobeys a direct order at a call. Also, Severide and Herrmann clash over office space when Herrmann assumes Casey's old office quarters.
204	9	"Winterfest"	Reza Tabrizi	Derek Haas	December 8, 2021	1009	6.77
Boden is forced to give Severide an ultimatum when it comes to filling in the vacant lieutenant truck spot as Stella continues her leave of absence. Meanwhile, Brett prepares for her presentation for her para-medicine program. Violet, Gallo and Ritter introduce their new beer at Winterfest. Also, Mouch lends a helping hand to a victim’s wife after her husband is impaled by a Christmas tree.
205	10	"Back with a Bang"	Matt Earl Beesley	Andrea Newman & Michael Gilvary	January 5, 2022	1010	7.15
Kidd deals with the fallout following her long absence with Severide putting himself at a distance. 51 struggles to put out a potassium fire in a tunnel. Pelham begins to worry about his place at 51. Ritter lends a helping hand to a young police officer who witnessed the death of a truck driver in a fiery crash.
206	11	"Fog of War"	Lisa Robinson	Matt Whitney	January 12, 2022	1011	7.41
Pelham's career as a firefighter is put in jeopardy when a fellow firefighter is struck by a live wire while at a call and she starts throwing all the blame on him. Boden begins to dig deeper into the fire commissioners past. Violet receives an award for heroism from Hawkins, leading her to believe that he has feelings for her. Also, Brett gets a surprise visit from Scott and her sister Amelia.
207	12	"Show of Force"	Lisa Demaine	Teleplay by : Andrea Newman & Michael Gilvary; Story by : Elizabeth Sherman	January 19, 2022	1012	7.27
Severide, Kidd and Boden work together to help Pelham save his career at 51. Meanwhile, Kidd also steps in as a temporary replacement for Pelham, with Boden observing from the sidelines. Hermann meets a young man from his past while visiting the fire academy. Finally, some of 51 get ready for the CFD gala.
208	13	"Fire Cop"	Kantú Lentz	Andrea Newman & Michael Gilvary	February 23, 2022	1013	6.83
Severide and Seager join forces to investigate a fire and Kidd wonders if there is something brewing between the pair. Violet and Gallo face the fallout from Violet hooking up with Hawkins.
209	14	"An Officer with Grit"	Stephen Cragg	Matt Demblowski	March 2, 2022	1014	6.89
Chief Hawkins goes above and beyond to help Brett and Violet with a problem. Kidd pursues an open lieutenant position. A blast from the past asks Mouch and Herrmann for a favor.
210	15	"The Missing Piece"	Daniel Willis	Andrea Newman & Michael Gilvary	March 9, 2022	1015	7.14
Following an injury in the aftermath of an industrial fire, Severide and Seager work together to investigate an anonymous tip. Kidd searches for the right person to fill the open spot on Truck 81. A possible new recruit to 51 gets tested at a call.
211	16	"Hot and Fast"	Lisa Demaine	Elizabeth Sherman	March 16, 2022	1016	6.66
Cruz forms a bond with a young immigrant boy he meets while fighting an apartment fire. Squad makes plans to prank the newest member of their team. Hawkins and Violet struggle to keep their relationship a secret.
212	17	"Keep You Safe"	Reza Tabrizi	Ashley Cooper	April 6, 2022	1017	7.39
Severide and Kidd work with CPD regarding a suspicious car wreck. Hawkins and Violet's relationship is in jeopardy. Chloe and Cruz adjust to a new family dynamic.
213	18	"What's Inside You"	Brenna Malloy	Derek Haas	April 13, 2022	1018	7.20
Firehouse 51 must band together when one of their own is taken hostage.
214	19	"Finish What You Started"	Carlos Bernard	Matt Whitney	April 20, 2022	1019	7.21
Firehouse 51 tackles a fire caused by a dropped jet engine, and one of their own is accused of a theft related to the incident. Kidd and Boden disapprove of Kylie's potential new love interest.
215	20	"Halfway to the Moon"	Lisa Robinson	Andrea Newman & Michael Gilvary	May 11, 2022	1020	6.78
A family friend asks Herrmann for some advice on opening a bar. Tensions run high between Emma and Violet. Kidd struggles to keep her team together.
216	21	"Last Chance"	Brenna Malloy	Victor Teran	May 18, 2022	1021	6.79
Mouch and Ritter work to solve the mystery of the broken couch; Severide and Cruz tackle a food truck fire.
217	22	"The Magnificent City of Chicago"	Reza Tabrizi	Andrea Newman & Michael Gilvary	May 25, 2022	1022	7.03
The big wedding day arrives and Firehouse 51 welcomes Casey back to celebrate the joyous occasion. Emma's plans to replace Violet come to a shocking end.

== Production ==
=== Casting ===
On June 25, 2021, NBC announced that recurring cast member Hanako Greensmith who portrays Paramedic Violet Mikami had been upped to series regular. Series regular Jesse Spencer departed the series after the fifth episode, but returned as a special guest star for the season finale. Executive producer Andrea Newman became co-showrunner during the season, joining incumbent showrunner Derek Haas. The season is the last to feature a Dalmatian dog named Tuesday who died after filming for the season finale.

=== Filming ===
Filming for the tenth season began on July 20, 2021. On January 5, 2022, it was reported that filming had been suspended after several cast and crew members tested positive for COVID-19.

== Ratings ==
Viewership and ratings per episode of Chicago Fire season 10
No.	Title	Air date	Rating (18–49)	Viewers (millions)	DVR (18–49)	DVR viewers (millions)	Total (18–49)	Total viewers (millions)
1	"Mayday"	September 22, 2021	0.9	7.27	—	—	—	—
2	"Head Count"	September 29, 2021	0.9	7.36	—	—	—	—
3	"Counting Your Breaths"	October 6, 2021	0.8	7.18	—	—	—	—
4	"The Right Thing"	October 13, 2021	0.8	7.25	0.5	2.71	1.3	9.96
5	"Two Hundred"	October 20, 2021	0.8	7.36	0.5	2.77	1.3	10.13
6	"Dead Zone"	October 27, 2021	0.7	6.80	—	—	—	—
7	"Whom Shall I Fear?"	November 3, 2021	0.8	7.00	—	—	—	—
8	"What Happened at Whiskey Point?"	November 10, 2021	0.7	6.63	—	—	—	—
9	"Winterfest"	December 8, 2021	0.7	6.77	0.5	2.78	1.2	9.55
10	"Back With a Bang"	January 5, 2022	0.9	7.15	—	—	—	—
11	"Fog of War"	January 12, 2022	0.9	7.41	—	—	—	—
12	"Show of Force"	January 19, 2022	0.9	7.27	—	—	—	—
13	"Fire Cop"	February 23, 2022	0.8	6.83	—	—	—	—
14	"An Officer With Grit"	March 2, 2022	0.8	6.89	—	—	—	—
15	"The Missing Piece"	March 9, 2022	0.9	7.14	—	—	—	—
16	"Hot and Fast"	March 16, 2022	0.8	6.66	—	—	—	—
17	"Keep You Safe"	April 6, 2022	0.8	7.39	—	—	—	—
18	"What's Inside You"	April 13, 2022	0.8	7.20	—	—	—	—
19	"Finish What You Started"	April 20, 2022	0.8	7.21	—	—	—	—
20	"Halfway to the Moon"	May 11, 2022	0.7	6.78	—	—	—	—
21	"Last Chance"	May 18, 2022	0.7	6.79	—	—	—	—
22	"The Magnificent City of Chicago"	May 25, 2022	0.8	7.03	—	—	—	—
