= Chicago Fire season 9 =

Chicago Fire
- Season 9
- Chicago Fire Season 9 DVD cover
- Showrunner: Derek Haas
- No. of episodes: 16

Release
- Original network: NBC
- Original release: November 11, 2020 – May 26, 2021

Season chronology
- ← Previous; Season 8 Next → Season 10

The ninth season of Chicago Fire, an American drama television series with executive producer Dick Wolf, and producers Derek Haas and Matt Olmstead, was ordered on February 27, 2020, by NBC. The season premiered on November 11, 2020.

== Cast and characters ==
=== Main cast ===
- Jesse Spencer as Captain Matthew Casey, Truck Company 81
- Taylor Kinney as Lieutenant Kelly Severide, Squad Company 3
- Kara Killmer as Paramedic in Charge Sylvie Brett, Ambulance 61
- David Eigenberg as Lieutenant Christopher Herrmann, Engine Company 51
- Joe Minoso as Firefighter Joe Cruz, Squad Company 3
- Christian Stolte as Firefighter Randy "Mouch" McHolland, Truck Company 81
- Miranda Rae Mayo as Firefighter/Lieutenant Stella Kidd, Truck Company 81
- Alberto Rosende as Firefighter Candidate Blake Gallo, Truck Company 81
- Daniel Kyri as Firefighter Darren Ritter, Engine Company 51
- Adriyan Rae as Paramedic Gianna Mackey, Ambulance 61
- Eamonn Walker as Chief Wallace Boden, Battalion 25

=== Recurring characters ===
- Randy Flagler as Firefighter Harold Capp, Squad Company 3
- Anthony Ferraris as Firefighter Tony Ferraris, Squad Company 3
- Jon Ecker as Lieutenant Greg Grainger
- Hanako Greensmith as Paramedic Violet Mikami, Ambulance 61
- Katelynn Shennett as Kylie Estevez

=== Crossover characters ===
- Marina Squerciati as Officer Kim Burgess
- Amy Morton as Desk Sergeant Trudy Platt
- Yaya DaCosta as Nurse April Sexton
- Nick Gehlfuss as Dr. Will Halstead
- Patrick John Flueger as Officer Adam Ruzek

== Episodes ==
No. overall	No. in season	Title	Directed by	Written by	Original release date	Prod. code	U.S. viewers (millions)
180	1	"Rattle Second City"	Reza Tabrizi	Derek Haas	November 11, 2020	901	7.23
The firefighters and paramedics at Firehouse 51 are put on full alert as COVID-19 continues to ravage Chicago and the rest of the world. Meanwhile, following Foster's departure to medical school, Ambulance 61 introduces Gianna Mackey as the newest paramedic. It is revealed that Mackey and Cruz grew up together and he fought for her to get to 51. While on a call, Brett and Mackey deal with an OD patient whose brother threatens Brett's life with a gun. Later on, the door to Brett's apartment is left open leading Casey to spend the night with her. After saving Severide's life at a call, Boden recommends Kidd to take the lieutenant's test in a few months. Also, to promote the latest addition to the Molly's brand, Hermann recruits Mouch and Ritter to come up with an idea to promote the business. Mackey and Brett get the sad news that their patient died at Chicago Med. Later, while on their way to a call, Mackey and Brett are rammed down a hill by the OD victim's older brother and Ambulance 61 crashes.
181	2	"That Kind of Heat"	Reza Tabrizi	Andrea Newman & Michael Gilvary	November 18, 2020	902	7.77
As Firehouse 51 rushes to the Ambulance 61 accident, Casey jumps out of the truck to rush to Brett's side solidifying their feelings for each other. Later on, the duo share a kiss but Brett asks Casey if he is still in love with Dawson. Meanwhile, Mackey begins to question her place in 51 following the accident. Kidd reaches out to one of her "Girls on Fire" students after she stops showing up to the program. Ritter puts himself in harms way at a call involving a woman falling on the train tracks. Gallo and Ritter inadvertently get themselves into dealing with piles of paper work in the bull pen. Also, Severide goes the extra mile to save a memory from being destroyed.
182	3	"Smash Therapy"	Eric Laneuville	Matt Whitney	January 13, 2021 (Note: This episode was originally scheduled to air on January 6, 2021, in the United States and Canada. In the United States it was replaced by a rerun of season 8 episode "Best Friend Magic" in the Pacific and Mountain time zone as a result of the January 6 United States Capitol attack, however the episode still partially aired on its originally scheduled air date for Canada's east coast on CityTV before being switched for a re-run of episode 2.)	903	7.26
Tensions run high with Casey and Brett following the aftermath of their kiss. Brett wants to forget about it however, Casey does not. Meanwhile, Mouch's abilities are questioned when the turntable on the ladder truck malfunctions injuring Casey in the process. Severide lends a hand to a man whose classic car was almost burned in a fire. Also, Boden receives a new assistant for the office.
183	4	"Funny What Things Remind Us"	Matt Earl Beesley	Elizabeth Sherman	January 27, 2021 (Note: This episode was originally scheduled to air on January 13, 2021 in the United States and Canada, but was replaced in the United States by "Smash Therapy", which was postponed from the previous Wednesday.)	904	6.95
While on an assignment from headquarters, Boden, along with Severide make an unforeseen connection with a man who suffers from dementia. Meanwhile, Mouch reignites an old feud with a fellow firefighter at a neighboring Firehouse. Kidd begins to fear that Severide is pulling away from her. In an attempt to move on from Brett, Casey contemplates getting back into the dating life. Also, Gallo makes a split second decision when saving Mackey's life in a building explosion.
184	5	"My Lucky Day"	Reza Tabrizi	Michael Gilvary & Andrea Newman & Derek Haas	February 3, 2021 (Note: This episode was originally scheduled to air on January 20, 2021, in the United States and Canada, but was preempted in the United States for news coverage of the Inauguration of Joe Biden.)	905	7.31
While at a call at a high rise building, Herrmann and Cruz along with two civiians become trapped in a service elevator when one of the cables snaps. Herrmann soon discovers that they have lost communication with the rest of the house. Later on, to keep calm, Herrmann and Cruz tell stories about their respective home lives outside the firehouse.
185	6	"Blow This Up Somehow"	Matt Earl Beesley	Andrea Newman & Michael Gilvary	February 10, 2021	906	7.50
After Gallo makes another split-second decision again while at a call involving a woman covered in gasoline, Casey is forced to discipline him for his actions. Later on, Casey considers his actions with his new love interest. Meanwhile, after a max dose of fentanyl failed to work on a victim whose leg was sawed open, the paramedic review board suspects that Mackey might be stealing drugs off the ambulance. Also, Kidd continues to question her relationship with Severide as he continues to pull away. Mouch begins to suspect that Cruz is hiding something from him as Cruz tries to keep the news that he is having a child.
186	7	"Dead of Winter"	Brenna Malloy	Kimberly Ndombe	February 17, 2021	907	7.29
Casey and Severide look into a possible arson call involving a homeless camp site when one of the members died from complications. Ritter lends a helping hand to a young homeless person who was at the same camp. Meanwhile, Cruz reveals to the firehouse that he is having a child and has a close call when a piece of metal cuts his face. Brett considers a new romantic path with a firefighter at another house. Also, Gallo and Mackey discuss their romantic encounter.
187	8	"Escape Route"	Matt Earl Beesley	Neil McCormack	March 10, 2021	908	7.04
Severide's professional past comes to haunt him while at a call involving a house fire caused by a defective refrigerator that nearly cost his life at another call several years ago. Meanwhile, while Hermann is on a family vacation, Casey discovers that his temporary replacement is a guy that Brett is dating and begins to take out his jealousy on him. Also, Cruz recruits the members of 51 on coming up with the next great idea for the firehouse following the success of the slamigan.
188	9	"Double Red"	Reza Tabrizi	Derek Haas	March 17, 2021	909	7.48
While at a car accident call, Casey inadvertently gets caught in a fight with a driver who is drunk behind the wheel and the driver starts to drive away and Casey receives a blow to the head. Later on, Casey reveals that he received an MRI back in 2013 as a result of another head injury where results state that his memories could deteriorate. At the same time, Casey's sister returns to Chicago and asks Casey to come with her to see what their deceased Uncle had left them. Mouch, Mackey, Ritter and Gallo attend TRA training where Mackey is offered to be transferred to another firehouse for a better opportunity. And Stella plans a big surprise for Severide much to his dismay.
189	10	"One Crazy Shift"	Milena Govich	Ashley Cooper	March 31, 2021	910	7.35
After a series of calls involving washer and dryers going up in flames at local laundromats, Severide and Casey search for the manufacturer of the laundry detergent that might have been the cause of the fires. Casey is still not normal after his head injury. Meanwhile, Brett searches for a new paramedic following Mackey's departure and lands a temporary one from another Firehouse much to Gallo's dismay. Gallo voices his concerns to Casey about him not getting a head examination from his head blow at the previous call and Casey briefly snaps at him. After a series of unusual incidents, Kidd begins to be convinced that she is being jinxed just before her lieutenants exam. Also, Mouch asks for Gallo and Ritter's help when an audition comes up for a Bagpipe Band.
190	11	"A Couple Hundred Degrees"	Brenna Malloy	Andrea Newman & Michael Gilvary	April 7, 2021	911	6.65
Brett and Violet respond to a call in which a man breaks his arm falling down stairs at a bakery and a bystander keeps pressing for his condition. Later on, they soon discover that the bystander is from a rival bakery trying to put him out of business. Severide makes a tough decision when teaching a firefighter class after finding out that a recruit is not following the protocols. Meanwhile, Brett grows concerned about Casey's health. Also, Hermann sets up Ritter on a blind date.
191	12	"Natural Born Firefighter"	Eric Laneuville	Matt Whitney	April 21, 2021	912	6.92
After receiving advice from Brett and Gallo, Casey decides to go to the doctor to get an MRI about his head injury. Casey begins to fear that results could mean that he might have to quit the CFD. Meanwhile, Hermann and Kidd lend a helping hand to a guy wanting to be a firefighter but they find out has a criminal background. Gallo and Ritter team up with Mouch to begin a commission to recruit young people to join the CFD. Brett begins to have doubts about her relationship with Greg. Also, Boden goes to war with a guy who steals his parking space.
192	13	"Don't Hang Up"	Reza Tabrizi	Derek Haas	May 5, 2021 (Note: This episode was originally scheduled to air on April 28, 2021, in the United States and Canada, but was preempted in the United States due to President Joe Biden's presidential address to the joint session of Congress.)	913	7.22
Stella is put into a stressful situation when a young woman calls for her at the firehouse saying that she is in danger and that she and her brother are about to be killed by gang members. Meanwhile, Casey and Brett grow distant from each other following Casey's test results. Cruz challenges Hermann in a baby swaddling contest. Also, Boden's wife, Donna is forced to teach her zoom classes at the firehouse due to their poor wifi connection at home.
193	14	"What Comes Next"	Eric Laneuville	Elizabeth Sherman	May 12, 2021	914	7.08
Severide and Casey look into the circumstances of what caused a fire at a local pet food factory when sulfuric acid was found on scene. Brett doesn't know what to do with her cat. Severide confides in Casey thinking that he might want to propose marriage to Stella. Casey considers his options with Brett. Meanwhile, Stella waits the results of her lieutenants exam. Later, 61 responds to a call where a man has something stuck inside his mouth. Also, Boden puts Gallo and Ritter in charge of the annual 51 garage sale. Later, Stella hears the word "Lieutenant" from Boden and is excited.
194	15	"A White-Knuckle Panic"	Reza Tabrizi	Andrea Newman & Michael Gilvary	May 19, 2021	915	6.84
Boden, Severide and Casey are put into an uncomfortable situation when discussing Stella's future at 51 after she got promoted to Lieutenant. Severide begins to rethink proposing to Stella following her statement on not wanting to marry again, but later he and Stella get engaged after he proposes to her during a fire. Meanwhile, Violet, Gallo and Ritter plan a ceremony for Mouch when he receives a medal for bravery and heroism. Also, Casey pours out his emotional feelings for Brett.
195	16	"No Survivors"	Lisa Robinson	Derek Haas	May 26, 2021	916	7.26
Boden contemplates a decision whether to leave 51 to become Deputy District Chief or to see Stella get transferred to another house. After revealing their engagement to the entire firehouse, Severide asks Casey to be his best man. Also, Brett tries to avoid Casey after he reveals his true feelings for her. Brett and Casey kiss after she confesses her feelings for him. Later Casey and Brett sleep together. Afterwards, a mysterious stranger shows up at the Firehouse. Severide and the rest of the Squad's life hang in the balance when at a call of a boat capsizing in Lake Michigan.

== Production ==
=== Casting ===
On April 16, 2020, it was announced that Annie Ilonzeh, who portrayed Paramedic Emily Foster, would depart the series after two seasons. On August 31, 2020, it was announced that recurring cast member Daniel Kyri who portrays Firefighter candidate Darren Ritter since the seventh season was promoted to series regular for season nine. On September 14, 2020, it was announced that Adriyan Rae was joining the cast as series regular Paramedic Gianna Mackey. Rae subsequently departed the cast following the season's ninth episode, showrunner Derek Haas stated that she left the series for personal reasons but that the possibility was open for her to return in a later episode. It was announced on March 19, 2021, that Hanako Greensmith, who had previously recurred as Violet Mikami would return in a recurring capacity to replace Rae's character as 51's latest paramedic. Former series regular Monica Raymund was set to return towards the end of the season but was unable to due to COVID restrictions.

=== Filming ===
Season 9 began filming October 6, 2020 amid the COVID-19 pandemic. The season contained 16 episodes. On November 11, 2020, it was reported that the ninth season had suspended production for two weeks due to multiple positive COVID-19 tests.

== Ratings ==
Viewership and ratings per episode of Chicago Fire season 9
No.	Title	Air date	Rating (18–49)	Viewers (millions)	DVR (18–49)	DVR viewers (millions)	Total (18–49)	Total viewers (millions)
1	"Rattle Second City"	November 11, 2020	1.0	7.23	0.7	3.35	1.7	10.59
2	"That Kind of Heat"	November 18, 2020	1.0	7.77	0.6	3.07	1.6	10.84
3	"Smash Therapy"	January 13, 2021	1.0	7.26	0.6	2.93	1.6	10.20
4	"Funny What Things Remind Us"	January 27, 2021	0.9	6.95	—N/a	—N/a	—N/a	—N/a
5	"My Lucky Day"	February 3, 2021	1.0	7.31	—N/a	—N/a	—N/a	—N/a
6	"Blow This Up Somehow"	February 10, 2021	1.0	7.50	0.6	3.09	1.6	10.60
7	"Dead of Winter"	February 17, 2021	1.0	7.29	0.5	2.94	1.5	10.23
8	"Escape Route"	March 10, 2021	1.0	7.04	0.6	3.22	1.6	10.27
9	"Double Red"	March 17, 2021	0.9	7.48	—N/a	—N/a	—N/a	—N/a
10	"One Crazy Shift"	March 31, 2021	1.0	7.35	—N/a	—N/a	—N/a	—N/a
11	"A Couple Hundred Degrees"	April 7, 2021	0.8	6.65	0.6	2.98	1.4	9.63
12	"Natural Born Firefighter"	April 21, 2021	0.9	6.92	—N/a	—N/a	—N/a	—N/a
13	"Don't Hang Up"	May 5, 2021	1.0	7.22	0.6	2.83	1.5	10.05
14	"What Comes Next"	May 12, 2021	0.9	7.08	0.6	2.75	1.5	9.83
15	"A White-Knuckle Panic"	May 19, 2021	0.8	6.84	0.5	2.88	1.3	9.73
16	"No Survivors"	May 26, 2021	0.9	7.26	0.5	2.79	1.4	10.05
