= Chicago Fire (TV series) =

American procedural drama series

- Genre: Procedural drama
- Created by: Derek Haas; Michael Brandt
- Showrunners: Derek Haas; Matt Olmstead; Michael Brandt; Dick Wolf; Andrea Newman; Victor Teran
- Starring: See List of Chicago Fire characters
- Composer: Atli Örvarsson
- Country of origin: United States
- Original language: English
- No. of seasons: 15
- No. of episodes: 302 (list of episodes)

Production
- Executive producers: Dick Wolf; Matt Olmstead; Danielle Gelber; Michael Brandt; Derek Haas; Joe Chappelle; Arthur W. Forney; Peter Jankowski; Todd Arnow; Andrea Newman; Michael Gilvary; Reza Tabrizi
- Producers: John L. Roman; Todd Arnow; Tim Deluca; Hilly Hicks Jr.; Carla Corwin; Michael Gilvary; Demetra Diamantopoulos; Matt Whitney; Victor Teran
- Production locations: Cinespace Chicago Film Studios, Chicago, Illinois
- Camera setup: Single-camera
- Running time: 40–44 minutes
- Production companies: Wolf Entertainment; Open 4 Business Productions; Universal Television

Original release
- Network: NBC
- Release: October 10, 2012 – present

Related
- Chicago Med; Chicago P.D.; Chicago Justice

Chicago Fire is an American procedural drama series broadcast by NBC. The series was created by Derek Haas and Michael Brandt and the series is the first installment of the Chicago franchise. It has a large ensemble cast including Jesse Spencer, Taylor Kinney, Monica Raymund, Lauren German, Charlie Barnett, David Eigenberg, Teri Reeves, Eamonn Walker, Yuri Sardarov, Christian Stolte, Joe Miñoso, Kara Killmer, Dora Madison Burge, Steven R. McQueen, Miranda Rae Mayo, Annie Ilonzeh, Alberto Rosende, Daniel Kyri, Adriyan Rae, Hanako Greensmith, Jake Lockett, Jocelyn Hudon and Dermot Mulroney, and premiered on October 10, 2012. As of November 11, 2026, the series has aired 301 episodes. In March 2026, the series was renewed for a fifteenth season, which premiered on October 7, 2026.

== Plot ==
The show explores the professional and personal lives of the firefighters, rescue personnel, and paramedics of the Chicago Fire Department at the fictional Firehouse 51, home of Engine 51, Truck 81, Rescue Squad 3, and Ambulance 61.

== Cast ==
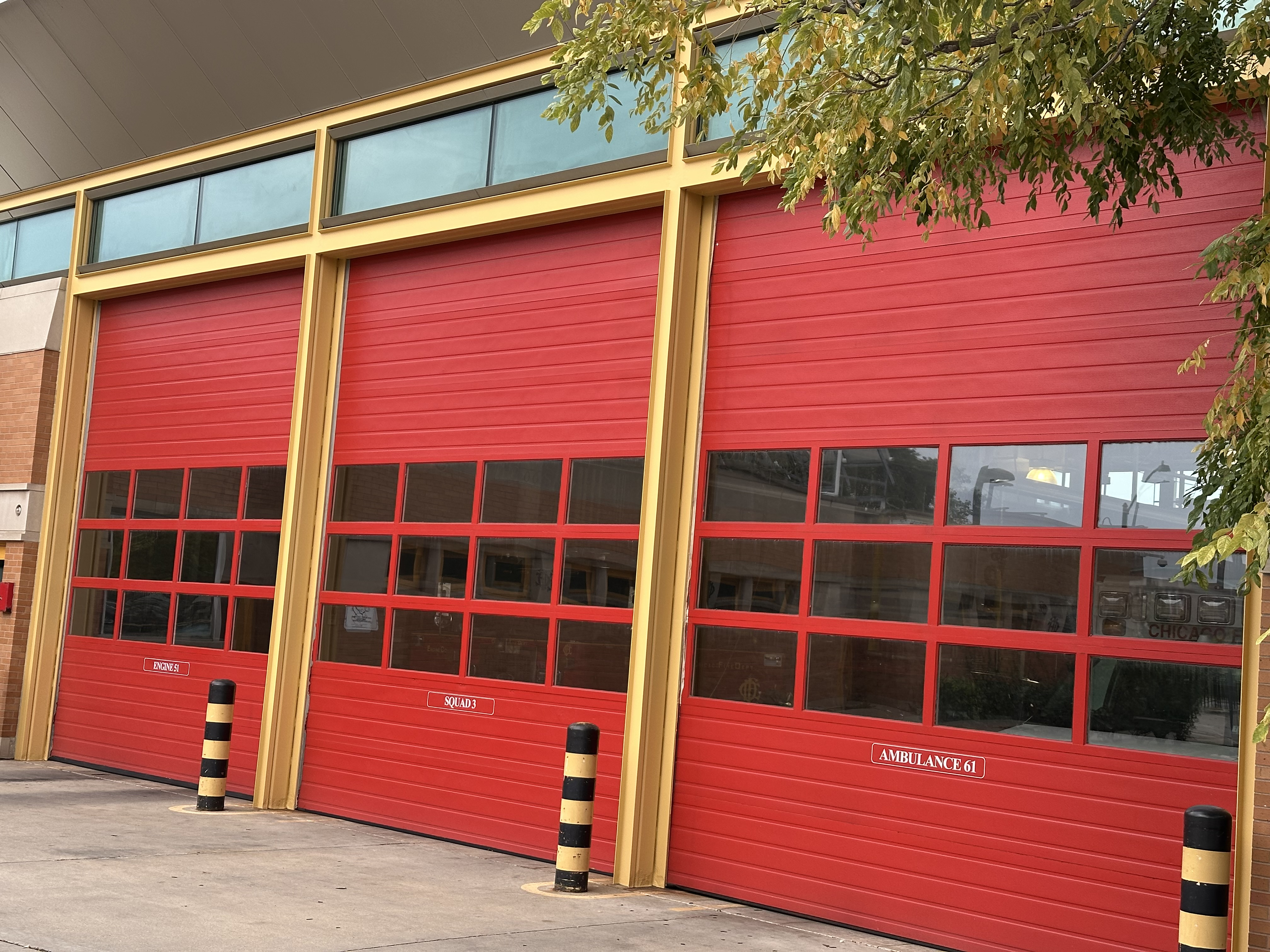

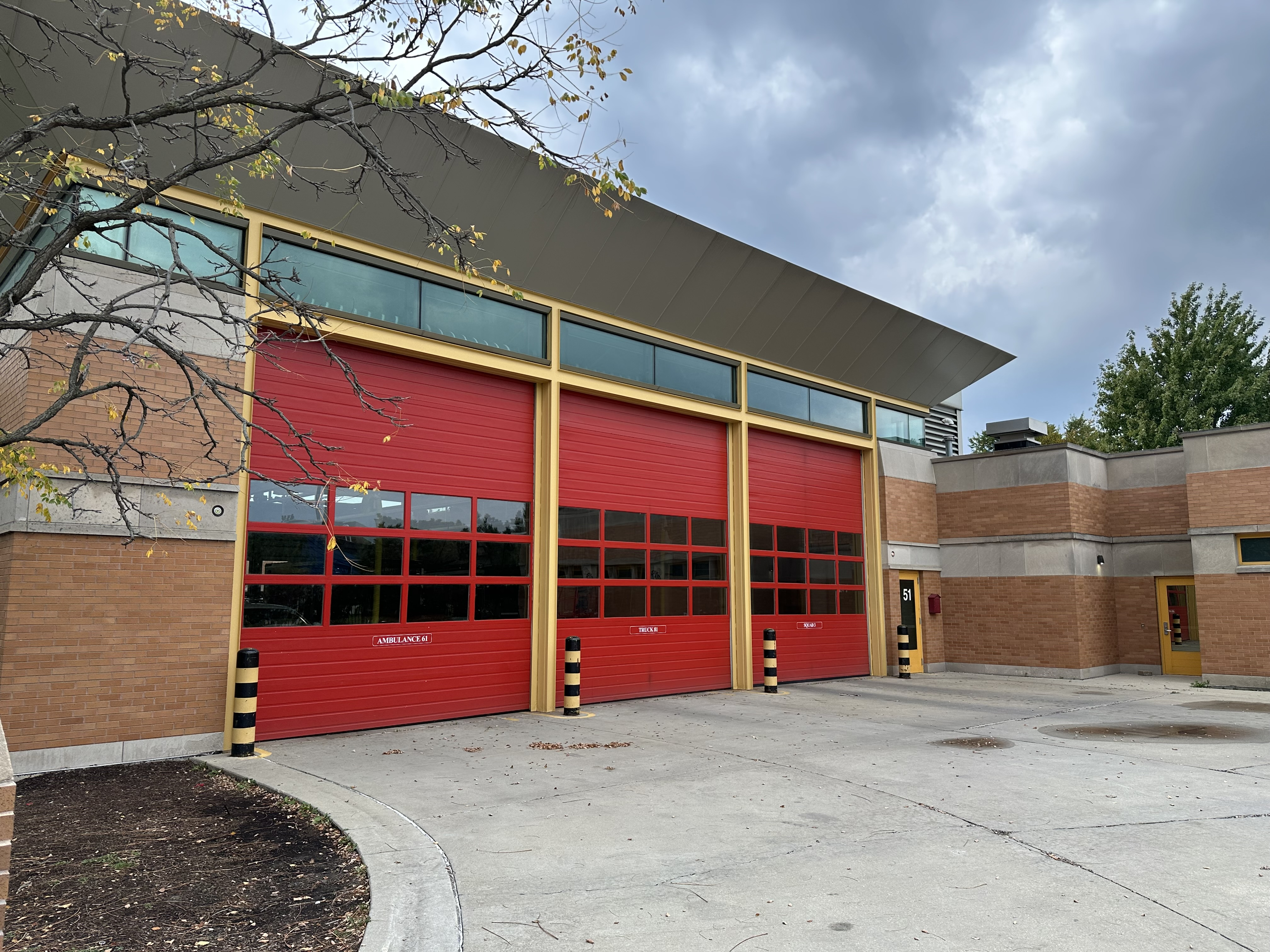
The bays and exterior set for “Chicago Fire” is the real-life Quarters of Engine 18, but here they are marked for filming as the Quarters of Engine 51, Truck 81, Squad 3, and Ambulance 61. The distinctions among these different entities are a key element in the series. Engine Company 18’s Quarters are a real-life firehouse. The Quarters of Engine 51, Truck 81, Squad 3 and Ambulance Unit 61 are fictional.

- Jesse Spencer as Captain Matthew "Matt" Casey, Truck Company 81 (seasons 1–10; guest seasons 11–12), a Lieutenant at Firehouse 51 and the officer in charge of Truck Company 81. He serves as Battalion Chief Wallace Boden's second-in-command. Casey is a skilled handyman and carpenter, freelancing as a construction contractor when off-duty. He is civic-minded and becomes an elected alderman to further serve the city. Despite his reticence and aloof demeanor, he is fiercely protective of the firefighters under him and commands their loyalty and respect. He was briefly engaged to Dr. Hallie Thomas in season 1 and, from seasons 5 to 7, was married to Gabriela Dawson. In season 6, he is promoted to Captain. In the season 9 finale, he begins dating paramedic Sylvie Brett. In season 10, Casey moves to Oregon to take care of Andrew Darden's sons while maintaining a long-distance relationship with Brett. He later returns in the season finale to attend Severide and Kidd's wedding. In the season 11 premiere, Brett breaks up with him, feeling they had grown apart due to the distance. In the season 11 finale, he returns to Chicago and proposes to Sylvie. They married in season 12.
- Taylor Kinney as Captain Kelly Severide, Rescue Squad 3, a Lieutenant at Firehouse 51, and the officer in charge of Squad 3. In contrast to Casey, he is charismatic and portrayed as something of a "ladies' man". He and Casey have been friends since their days at the CFD Academy. His father was Battalion Chief Benny Severide, a longtime friend of Boden and Henry Mills, father of Candidate Peter Mills. In the season 4 finale, he begins dating Stella Kidd. In season 9, they become engaged. In season 10, they get married. In season 14, he attempts to succeed Dom Pascal as Firehouse 51's Battalion Chief. In the season 14 finale, Chief Pascal informed him his promotion to Captain had gone through. After much consideration, Severide ultimately decided to become 51's commanding officer.
- Monica Raymund as Paramedic in Charge Gabriela "Gabby" Dawson, Ambulance 61 (seasons 1–6; guest seasons 7–8), the younger sister of Detective Antonio Dawson. Dawson is one of the few women at 51 and is usually treated as a sister by the men. She is the Paramedic in Charge of Ambulance 61, but also attends fire academy training to become a firefighter and joins Truck 81. She later transfers back to Ambulance 61 to provide cover for Jimmy Borelli and becomes a foster parent. In season 1, she briefly dates Peter Mills. From seasons 5 to 7, she was married to Casey. In the season 6 finale, she left Chicago to head a rescue-and-relief unit in Puerto Rico, but briefly returned to say goodbye to Casey in the season 7 premiere and again for a charity ball in season 8.
- Lauren German as Paramedic Leslie Elizabeth Shay, Ambulance 61 (seasons 1–2; guest season 3), an experienced paramedic. Shay was the designated ambulance driver and was well-liked by the predominantly male crew of 51. She and Kelly Severide shared an apartment as roommates and were best friends. She was openly lesbian and often cracked self-deprecating jokes about it. In the season 3 premiere's continuation of the season 2 finale, she was killed when a serial arsonist intentionally set a trap for first responders. She is then memorialized by her co-workers with an inscription painted on the cab door of Ambulance 61.
- Charlie Barnett as Firefighter/Paramedic in Charge Peter Mills, Truck 81, Squad 3, Ambulance 61 (seasons 1–3), a candidate on Truck 81, following in his deceased father's footsteps. After proving his capabilities as a firefighter, he earns a spot on Squad 3. After losing his firefighter certification due to injury, he transfers to Ambulance 61 to keep working. He eventually recovers and earns his spot back on Squad 3, but chooses to leave Chicago to work with his family in North Carolina. He briefly dates Gabriela Dawson in season 1.
- David Eigenberg as Senior Firefighter Christopher Herrmann, previously Truck 81, Engine 51, one of the veteran firefighters at 51. He serves on Truck 81 before he passes the Lieutenant exam, after five previous attempts, and is officially promoted to Lieutenant in season 7, taking over as officer in charge of Engine Company 51. As a Lieutenant, he serves as fourth-in-command to Battalion Chief Wallace Boden. A father figure to the firehouse, the men and women often come to him for advice. He, Otis, and Dawson jointly invest in a small bar, which they call Molly's. Molly's is also featured on Chicago P.D. and Chicago Med as a favorite hangout of cops and medical personnel. In season 13, Boden persuades Herrmann to take the Captain exam, and despite his doubts, Herrmann passes the exam and is promoted to Captain. In the season 13 finale, Herrmann voluntarily turns in his Captain bugles to allow for Mouch to take the Lieutenant spot on Engine and is demoted to firefighter. As part of this, he moved back to Truck 81.
- Eamonn Walker as Deputy Commissioner Wallace Boden, Battalion 25 (seasons 1–12; guest season 13), he oversees the firefighters and paramedics of Truck 81, Engine 51, Squad 3 and Ambulance 61 at Firehouse 51. A longtime veteran of the CFD, he is extremely protective of the men and women who serve under him, putting his career on the line several times to help them. He is married to Donna, a teacher, and they have a son named Terrance, who was born in season 3. In season 10, he was promoted to Deputy District Chief. In the season 12 finale, he was appointed as the new Deputy Commissioner of the CFD. In season 13, he returns to investigate a dangerous fire that caused a firefighter to be left trapped inside a burning building.
- Yuri Sardarov as Firefighter Brian "Otis" Zvonecek, Truck 81 (recurring season 1; seasons 2–8), the latest candidate assigned to 81 before Mills' assignment. He is routinely assigned to work on elevators, and his nickname came from the Otis Elevator Company. Otis became the driver after Cruz transferred to Squad 3. In the season 8 premiere's continuation of the season 7 finale, he was fatally wounded and died with Cruz by his side in the hospital.
- Christian Stolte as Lieutenant Randall "Mouch" McHolland, Truck 81 (recurring season 1; season 2–present), another veteran firefighter at 51. Mouch is the de facto "legal advisor" of 51 and is their union representative. His nickname is a portmanteau of "man" and "couch" since he is almost always seen sitting on the couch in the lounge watching television when not on a call. In season 4, he marries Sergeant Trudy Platt. In season 13, he is promoted to Lieutenant, although he remained Senior Firefighter aboard Truck 81 with Lieutenant Kidd as the senior officer until the season 13 finale, when he was promoted to Lieutenant of Engine 51. He later moved to another firehouse when his engine was decommissioned, but returned after Engine 51 was recommissioned.
- Joe Minoso as Firefighter Josef "Joe" Cruz, Squad 3 (recurring season 1; main seasons 2–15), a native of the gangster-infested neighborhood of Humboldt Park, he spends the first two seasons constantly trying to bail his younger brother out of trouble. In season 3, he briefly dates Sylvie Brett. In the season 3 finale, he transfers to Squad 3. In season 8, he marries Chloe Allen. He was formerly the designated driver for Truck 81 before his transfer to Squad 3. In season 10, his son is born, and they name him Brian Leon "Otis" Cruz. In the season 14 finale, his spine is injured during a warehouse fire, resulting in partial paralysis. In season 15, shortly after regaining his ability to walk, he chooses to retire from firefighting and move to Minneapolis with his family.
- Teri Reeves as Dr. Hallie Thomas (season 1), Casey's ex-fiancée. They broke up due to differing views, her hectic schedule, and his irregular hours, which prevented them from spending much time together, but they remained friends. They briefly rekindled their relationship until she was murdered in a fire as part of a cover-up after she discovered one of her colleagues was selling medication to drug dealers.
- Kara Killmer as Paramedic in Charge Sylvie Brett, Ambulance 61 (seasons 3–12), a paramedic who joins Ambulance 61 in season 3, replacing Leslie Shay after her death. She is from Fowlerton, Indiana and is a "runaway bride" who goes up I-65 to Chicago. Initially, she has difficulty adjusting to city life due to her naivety, as shown by how she leaves cash out on the table with the windows open and rents an apartment in a neighborhood known for crime because the rent was cheap. She briefly dates Joe Cruz in season 3 and shares an apartment with Dawson before the latter's marriage to Casey. After her third partner, Jessica Chilton, is fired for drinking on the job, Sylvie is promoted to Paramedic in Charge in season 4. She dates Dawson's brother, Antonio, from seasons 5 to 6 and is also briefly engaged to Chaplain Kyle Sheffield from seasons 7 to 8. In the season 9 finale, she begins dating Casey, and, in season 10, she begins a long-distance relationship with him when he moves to Oregon, which she later ends in the season 11 premiere after feeling they have grown apart by distance. In the season 11 finale, Casey returns to Chicago and proposes to Sylvie. They married in season 12.
- Dora Madison as Paramedic in Charge Jessica "Chili" Chilton (recurring season 3; main season 4), brought in to replace Peter Mills as the new Paramedic in Charge. Her arrival is initially met with some frostiness from the rest of the crew since they were still getting over Mills' sudden departure. She was previously with a firehouse in the West Side and is experienced in dealing with victims of major trauma. She briefly dates Jimmy Borelli in season 4. She is later fired by Chief Boden after the death of her sister causes her to nearly kill a patient by giving them the wrong medicine and relapse into alcoholism. After she is fired, she calls Severide for help, and he takes her to an Alcoholics Anonymous meeting.
- Steven R. McQueen as Firefighter Candidate James "Jimmy" Borrelli (seasons 4–5), introduced in the season 4 premiere as a new candidate assigned to Truck 81. He briefly dates Jessica "Chili" Chilton in season 4 and also briefly replaces her as a paramedic on Ambulance 61 after she is fired. Early in season 5, after his brother dies in a collapsed building, he blames Chief Boden and transfers back to Truck 81. Shortly thereafter, he is critically injured by an explosion that results in the loss of his left eye, thus ending his firefighting career.
- Miranda Rae Mayo as Lieutenant Stella Kidd, Truck 81 (recurring season 4; main season 5–present), introduced in season 4 as Jimmy Borelli's replacement on Truck 81. She briefly replaces Otis as driver in season 6 and permanently replaces him after his death in season 8. In season 9, after passing the exams, she is promoted to Lieutenant. In the season 4 finale, she begins dating Lieutenant Kelly Severide. In season 9, they become engaged. In the season 10 finale, they get married.
- Annie Ilonzeh as Paramedic Emily Foster, Ambulance 61 (seasons 7–8), a former medical student who replaces Gabriela Dawson on Ambulance 61. In the season 8 finale, she reapplies to medical school, and in the season 9 premiere, Brett says she was accepted back and is working in a COVID-19 ward.
- Alberto Rosende as Firefighter Blake Gallo, Truck 81 (seasons 8–12), Firehouse 51's latest recruit on Truck 81, replacing Otis after his death. Gallo became a firefighter after he lost his entire family and house in a fire. He leaves in the season 12 premiere, when it is revealed he has opted to move to Michigan to be near his relatives.
- Daniel Kyri as Firefighter Darren Ritter, Engine 51 (recurring seasons 7–8; main seasons 9–13, guest season 14), after Herrmann forcibly transfers Firefighter Barnes for his disrespect, Mouch suggests Ritter as a replacement. Previously with Engine 37, Mouch helped Ritter when he froze up during a fire and helped him make his first save. He is openly gay. In season 14, he leaves after his boyfriend, Officer Dwayne Monroe, is shot while on duty in New York City.
- Adriyan Rae as Paramedic Gianna Mackey, Ambulance 61 (season 9), Emily Foster's replacement on Ambulance 61. Gianna grew up in the same neighborhood as Cruz, who recommended her for the job after Foster left and is very protective of her. She quickly makes a good impression on her co-workers and enters a casual relationship with Blake Gallo. She transfers out of Firehouse 51 after being offered a spot at a new firehouse with better advancement opportunities.
- Hanako Greensmith as Paramedic in Charge Violet Mikami (recurring seasons 8–9; main season 10–present), a paramedic from Firehouse 20 and Blake Gallo's old rival from the CFD Academy. She and Gallo briefly dated in season 8. In season 9, Chief Boden asks her to temporarily transfer to Firehouse 51 to fill the spot on Ambulance 61 after Gianna Mackey leaves, and Brett soon convinces her to transfer to Firehouse 51 permanently. Following Sylvie Brett's departure in season 12, Violet was promoted to Paramedic in Charge. In season 14, Violet and Novak come up with the idea of starting a program to train firefighters as medics to take pressure off of ambulance crews.
- Jake Lockett as Firefighter Samuel "Sam" Carver (recurring seasons 11–12; main season 13; guest season 14), a former rival of Kidd's from the academy recruited to Truck 81. Proving himself a solid firefighter, Carver takes time to warm up to the crew. He works through issues of his own uncaring family and eventually accepts the genuine camaraderie of Firehouse 51. An off-duty carouser and occasional womanizer, he eases into a romance with Violet by the end of season 12. When the relationship stalls, Carver backslides into destructive behavior, resulting in his attending 12-step meetings for alcoholism and rehab. In the season 13 finale, he revealed he was transferring to the Denver Fire Department to support his sobriety and make a fresh start. In season 14, Carver returned to 51 with his Denver company to talk with Violet about her new program.
- Jocelyn Hudon as Paramedic Lyla "Lizzie" Novak, (recurring season 12; main season 13–present), Brett's replacement on Ambulance 61, a free-spirited paramedic who preferred to float from firehouse to firehouse until she embraced the stability of 51. Novak is flirtatious with a mischievous sense of humor, but shows herself to be an advocate for the victims she encounters daily on the job.
- Dermot Mulroney as Battalion Chief Dominic "Dom" Pascal, Battalion 25 (seasons 13–15), Boden's replacement as Battalion Chief of Firehouse 51. He is a stoic, dark-humored leader who has returned to Chicago to reunite with his estranged wife after dealing with corruption at his former post in Miami. Pascal's scrutinizing style differs from Boden's, but he quickly establishes respect and allegiance among the crew at 51. He is widowed by a car accident and works through his grief by staying on duty. He was let go by the CFD brass after being arrested by the FBI for obstructing a federal investigation, and after transferring to the Phoenix Fire Department, leaves Severide as Firehouse 51's commanding officer.
- Brandon Larracuente as Firefighter Salvador "Sal" Vasquez (season 14–present), a new firefighter and driver for Truck 81. He used to be in the police academy and has a reputation for disobeying his superiors' orders if he sees fit.
- Da'Vinchi as Firefighter Candidate Marcus Burke (season 15), a new candidate at 51. Initially cocky and disagreeable, he is eventually able to work past his issues and earns himself Cruz's old spot on Squad 3.

== Episodes ==
Season	Episodes	Originally released		Rank	Average viewers (million)
Season	Episodes	First released	Last released	Rank	Average viewers (million)
1	24	October 10, 2012	May 22, 2013	51	7.78
2	22	September 24, 2013	May 13, 2014	31	9.70
3	23	September 23, 2014	May 12, 2015	47	9.65
4	23	October 13, 2015	May 17, 2016	31	10.47
5	22	October 11, 2016	May 16, 2017	26	9.92
6	23	September 28, 2017	May 10, 2018	29	9.67
7	22	September 26, 2018	May 22, 2019	14	11.37
8	20	September 25, 2019	April 15, 2020	8	11.70
9	16	November 11, 2020	May 26, 2021	7	10.23
10	22	September 22, 2021	May 25, 2022	5	9.84
11	22	September 21, 2022	May 24, 2023	7	9.25
12	13	January 17, 2024	May 22, 2024	7	8.68
13	22	September 25, 2024	May 21, 2025	13	10.22
14	21	October 1, 2025	May 13, 2026	11	9.80
15	21	October 7, 2026	TBA	TBA	TBA

=== Crossovers ===
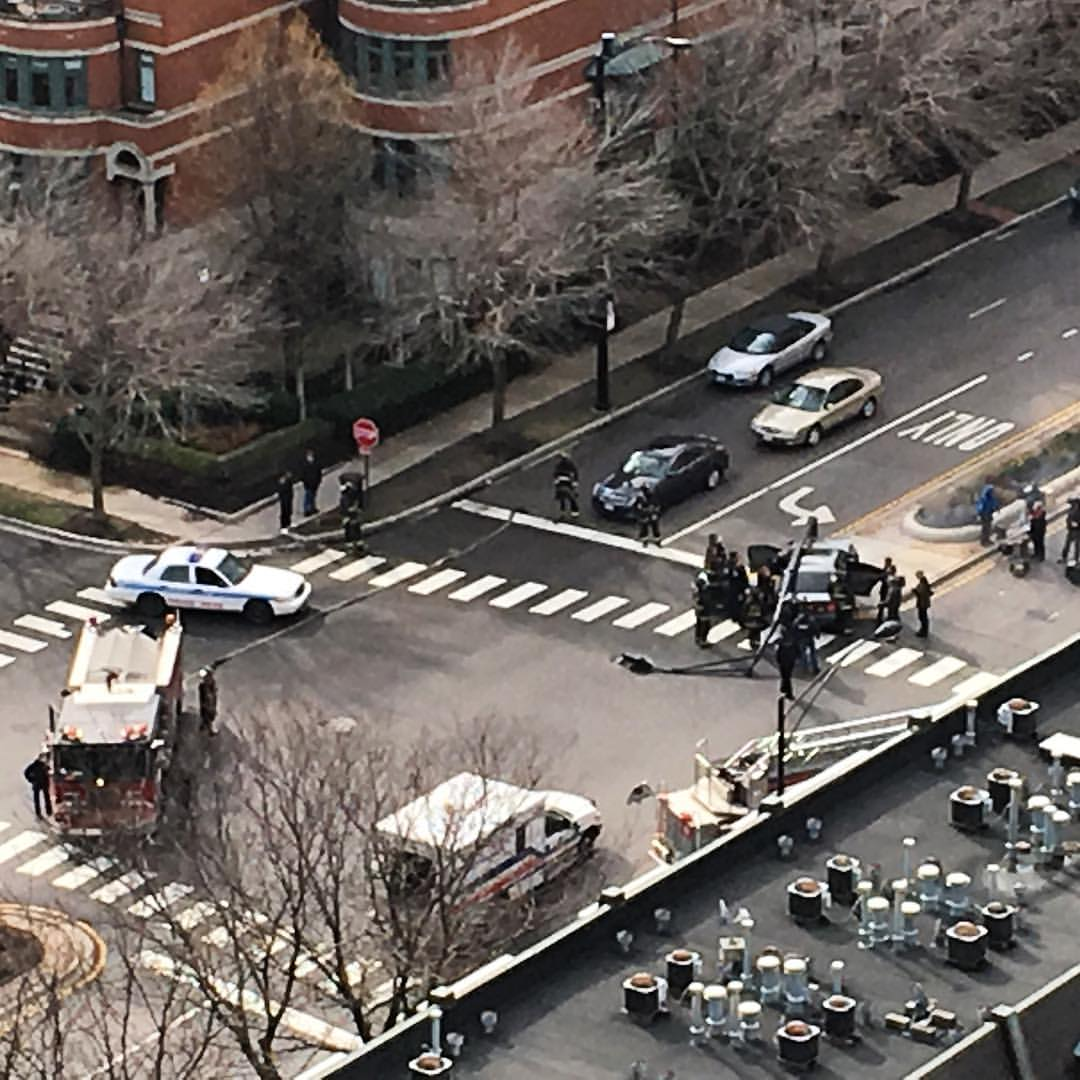
Filming of an episode in a residential neighborhood, 2016

- "8:30 PM" (Chicago P.D. Season 1, Episode 12) – In the first crossover with P.D., beginning on "A Dark Day", an explosion occurs at Chicago Med, sending the fire and police departments in a race against the clock to find the culprits.
- "Chicago Crossover" (Law & Order: Special Victims Unit Season 16, Episode 7) / "They'll Have to Go Through Me" (Chicago P.D. Season 2, Episode 7) – In the first crossover with P.D. and SVU, beginning on "Nobody Touches Anything", a routine house fire uncovers evidence of a pedophile ring spanning from Chicago to New York.
- "A Little Devil Complex" (Chicago P.D. Season 2, Episode 13) – In the second crossover with P.D., beginning on "Three Bells", Firehouse 51 and Intelligence search for the serial arsonist who killed Leslie Shay.
- "The Number of Rats" (Chicago P.D. Season 2, Episode 20) / "Daydream Believer" (Law & Order: Special Victims Unit Season 16, Episode 20) – In the second crossover with P.D. and SVU, beginning on "We Called Her Jellybean", a fire uncovers evidence of a serial arsonist suspected of committing rape and murder in Chicago and New York.
- "Malignant" (Chicago Med Season 1, Episode 5) / "Now I'm God" (Chicago P.D. Season 3, Episode 10) – In the first crossover with Med and P.D., beginning on "The Beating Heart", a member of Firehouse 51 is rushed to Chicago Med for a stabbing while an attempted suicide uncovers four cases of chemo overdose, leading to an investigation that becomes personal for Voight.
- "Don't Bury This Case" (Chicago P.D. Season 4, Episode 9) – In the third crossover with P.D., beginning on "Some Make It, Some Don't", Severide becomes the prime suspect in a case of vehicular manslaughter.
- "Emotional Proximity" (Chicago P.D. Season 4, Episode 16) / "Fake" (Chicago Justice Season 1, Episode 1) – In the only crossover with P.D. and Justice, beginning on "Deathtrap", the prime suspect in a warehouse fire is put on trial.
- "Profiles" (Chicago P.D. Season 5, Episode 16) – In the fourth crossover with P.D., concluding on "Hiding Not Seeking", Firehouse 51 helps Intelligence investigate a series of bombings targeting members of the media.
- "When to Let Go" (Chicago Med Season 4, Episode 2) / "Endings" (Chicago P.D. Season 6, Episode 2) – In the second crossover with Med and P.D., beginning on "Going to War", the victims of an apartment complex fire are rushed into Chicago Med and Intelligence races to find the culprit.
- "Good Men" (Chicago P.D. Season 6, Episode 15) – In the fifth crossover with P.D., beginning on "What I Saw", Cruz helps Intelligence track down robbers who have been using a firehouse lockbox key.
- "Burden of Truth" (Chicago P.D. Season 7, Episode 15) – In the sixth crossover with P.D., beginning on "Off the Grid", Sean Roman gets involved in the investigation of opioid overdoses connected to his sister.
- "Infection" (Chicago Fire Season 8, Episode 4/Chicago Med Season 5, Episode 4/Chicago P.D. Season 7, Episode 4) – In the third crossover with Med and P.D., a bioterrorist spreads a deadly bacteria throughout Chicago.
- "In the Trenches" (Chicago Fire Season 13, Episode 11/Chicago Med Season 10, Episode 11/Chicago P.D. Season 12, Episode 11)
- "Reckoning" (Chicago Fire Season 14, Episode 13/Chicago Med Season 11, Episode 13/Chicago P.D. Season 13, Episode 13)

== Production ==
=== Development ===
The series pilot, co-written by creators Michael Brandt and Derek Haas, was filmed in Chicago and, according to an NBC representative, the series would continue to be filmed there. Producer John L. Roman was involved from the beginning having worked with the Chicago Fire Department and Deputy District Chief Steve "Chik" Chikerotis on Backdraft. Mayor of Chicago Rahm Emanuel made an appearance in the series' pilot episode. Emanuel stated: "It's easier being mayor than playing mayor. I told them I'd do it under one condition: the TV show is making an investment to the Firefighters' Widows and Orphans Fund."

The title "Chicago Fire" sparked some confusion in the show's first season due to it duplicating the name of a local professional soccer team, the Chicago Fire Soccer Club (later renamed Chicago Fire FC). Actor Taylor Kinney has said "If you (say) 'We're working on Chicago Fire,' they ask you if you're a soccer player." Producer Dick Wolf hoped that fans of the team might watch the show. The Chicago Fire sports team accepted the shared name and showed the series premiere on October 2, 2012, at Toyota Park after a game with the Philadelphia Union.

The network placed an order for the series in May 2012. After receiving an additional script order in October, Chicago Fire was picked up for a full season on November 8, 2012. On January 29, 2013, Chicago Fire had its episode total increased from 22 to 23. One week later, on February 6, 2013, Chicago Fire received one more episode, giving it a total of 24 episodes for season one. The pilot episode had an early release at NBC.com, before the series' premiere on television.

On November 9, 2015, NBC renewed the series for a fifth season. The season premiered on October 11, 2016.

On May 9, 2018, NBC renewed the series for a seventh season, which premiered on September 26, 2018. On February 26, 2019, NBC renewed the series for an eighth season, which premiered on September 25, 2019. In February 2020, the series was renewed for its ninth, tenth, and eleventh season. The tenth season premiered on September 22, 2021. The eleventh season premiered on September 21, 2022. On April 10, 2023, NBC renewed the series for a twelfth season, which premiered on January 17, 2024. On March 21, 2024, NBC renewed the series for a thirteenth season which premiered on September 25, 2024.

For the first five seasons Matt Olmstead, Michael Brandt, and Derek Haas served as the series showrunners. Dick Wolf is also credited as a co-showrunner for the third season alongside Olmstead, Brandt, and Haas. Beginning with the sixth season, Haas took over as the sole showrunner. Executive producer Andrea Newman was promoted to co-showrunner with Haas for the tenth and eleventh seasons. Haas stepped down from his position ahead of the twelfth season while Newman took over as sole showrunner.

On May 5, 2025, NBC renewed the series for a fourteenth season which premiered on October 1, 2025. On March 27, 2026, the series was renewed for a fifteenth season. On April 24, 2026, it was announced that Newman would leave the series as show runner after the fourteenth season and that executive producer, Victor Teran would be promoted to show runner beginning with the fifteenth season.

=== Filming ===
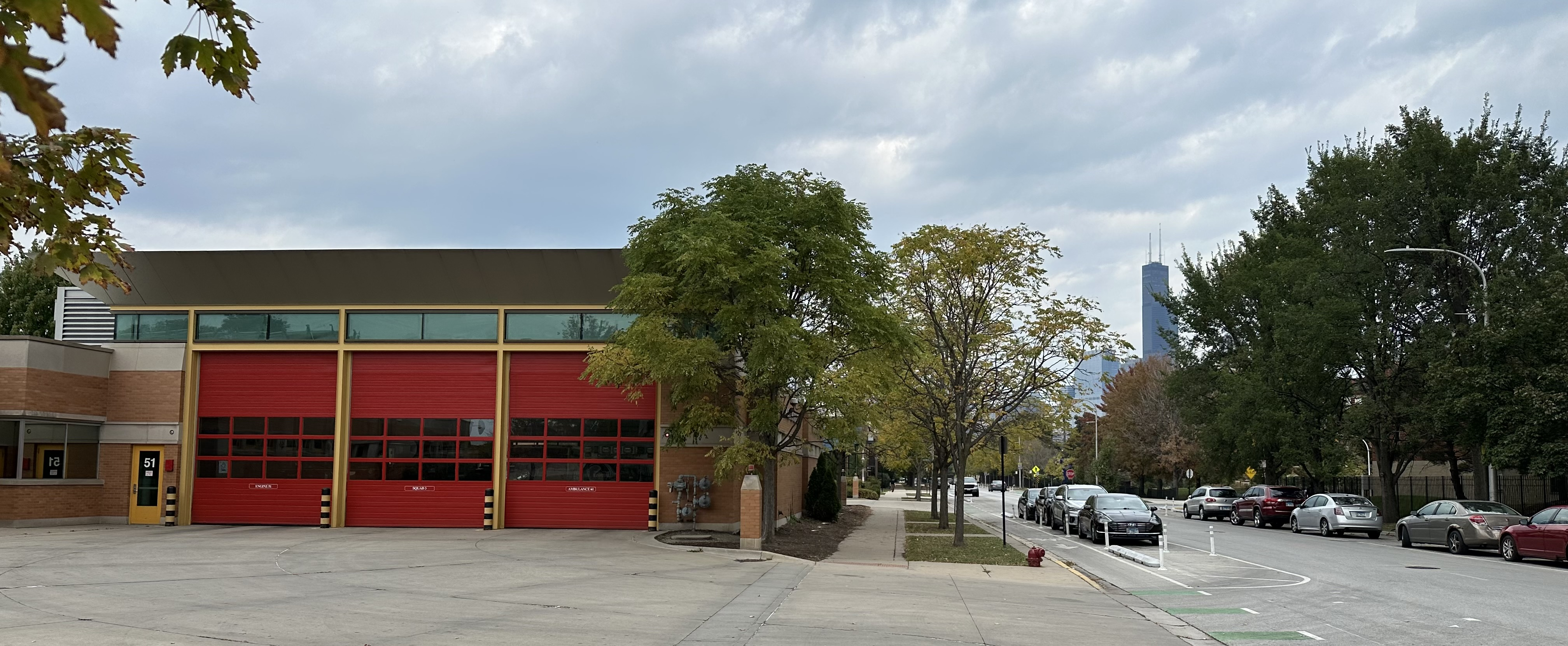
Firehouse 18 as the fictional Firehouse 51; the Sears Tower visible in the distance, a framing that is often used on the show

The building used in the show for the firehouse exteriors is a working Chicago Fire Department firehouse, and is the headquarters of Engine 18, located at 1360 South Blue Island Avenue at Maxwell Street, between 13th & Racine. Housed here is ALS Engine 18, 2–2–1 (Deputy District Chief – 1st District), 2–1–21 (1st District Chief), 6–4–16 (High-Rise Response Unit), and ALS Ambulance 65. The interiors of Firehouse 51 are filmed at Cinespace Chicago Film Studios. The station house used for exteriors in Chicago PD is just a few blocks away at 949 West Maxwell Street at Morgan Street (interiors likewise filmed at Cinespace).

Chicago artist and retired firefighter Lee J. Kowalski's oil paintings of fire scenes can be spotted in several episodes.

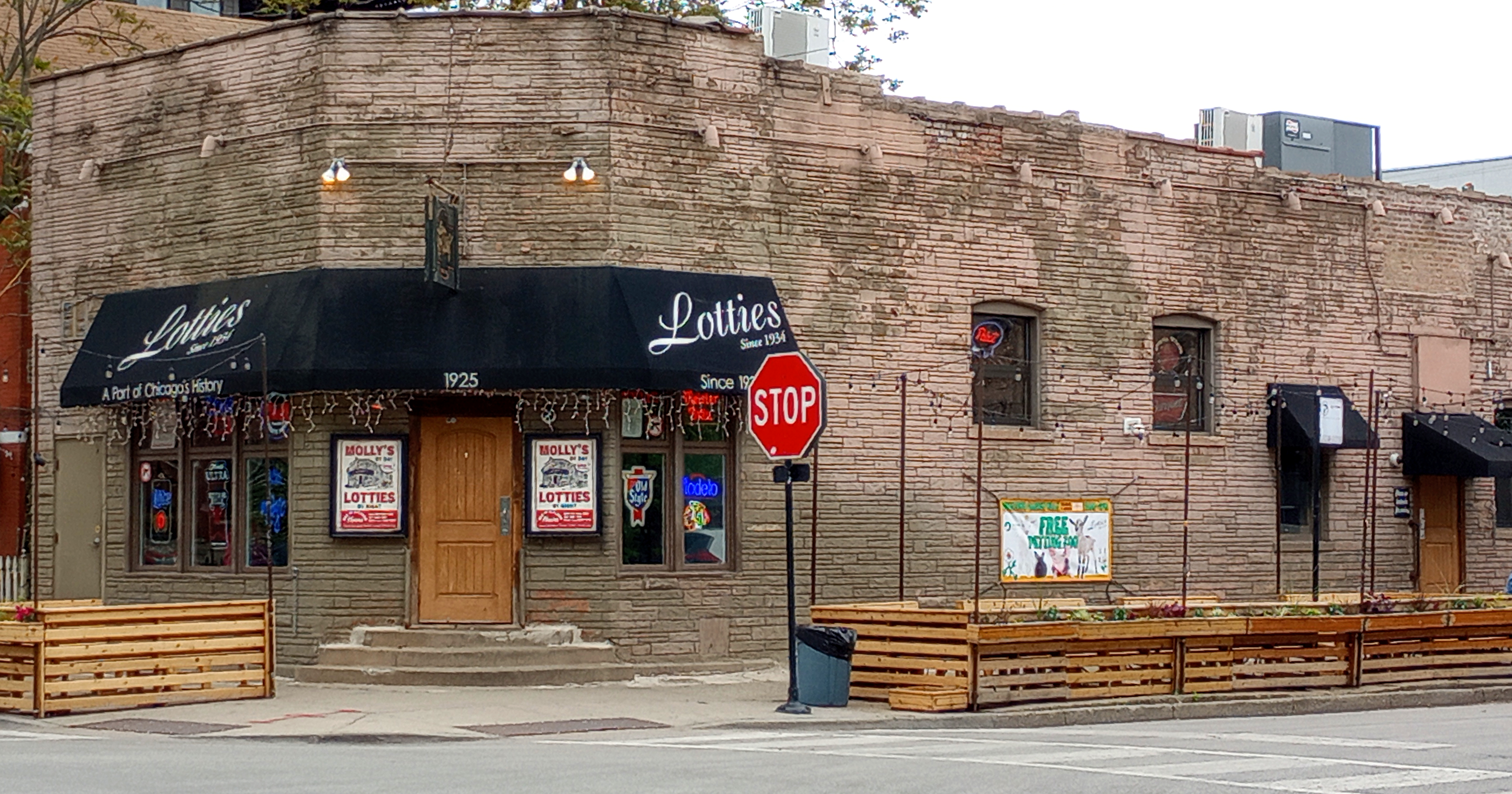
Lotties, the initial location and inspiration for the Molly's bar seen on the show

Molly's, a small bar owned by Herrmann, Dawson and Mouch, was filmed at Lotties in Bucktown. Filming no longer takes place on location to avoid disrupting business. Instead, the interior and exterior surroundings were recreated at Cinespace.

In November 2012, WGN-TV reported a plane crash at 29th and Martin Luther King Drive on their morning newscast and showed live footage for a few minutes before realizing it was merely a set piece staged for Chicago Fire and not an actual emergency situation.

On March 13, 2020, Universal Television shut down production on the series due to the COVID-19 pandemic.

Production on the series was temporarily halted on September 14, 2022, after a shooting occurred near the set.

== Reception ==
=== Ratings ===
Season	Timeslot (ET)	No. of episodes	Premiered		Ended		TV season	Rank	Viewers (million)
Season	Timeslot (ET)	No. of episodes	Date	Viewers (million)	Date	Viewers (million)	TV season	Rank	Viewers (million)
1	Wednesday 10:00 p.m.	24	October 10, 2012	6.61	May 22, 2013	6.13	2012–13	51	7.78
2	Tuesday 10:00 p.m.	22	September 24, 2013	8.90	May 13, 2014	7.12	2013–14	34	10.70
3	Tuesday 10:00 p.m.	23	September 23, 2014	9.14	May 12, 2015	6.66	2014–15	47	9.65
4	Tuesday 10:00 p.m.	23	October 13, 2015	7.37	May 17, 2016	7.91	2015–16	31	10.47
5	Tuesday 10:00 p.m.	22	October 11, 2016	7.52	May 16, 2017	6.30	2016–17	26	9.92
6	Thursday 10:00 p.m.	23	September 28, 2017	7.19	May 10, 2018	5.95	2017–18	29	9.67
7	Wednesday 9:00 p.m.	22	September 26, 2018	8.08	May 22, 2019	7.51	2018–19	14	11.70
8	Wednesday 9:00 p.m.	20	September 25, 2019	7.32	April 15, 2020	9.46	2019–20	8	11.70
9	Wednesday 9:00 p.m.	16	November 11, 2020	7.23	May 26, 2021	7.26	2020–21	7	10.23
10	Wednesday 9:00 p.m.	22	September 22, 2021	7.27	May 25, 2022	7.03	2021–22	5	9.84
11	Wednesday 9:00 p.m.	22	September 21, 2022	6.75	May 24, 2023	6.09	2022–23	5	9.25
12	Wednesday 9:00 p.m.	13	January 17, 2024	7.00	May 22, 2024	5.79	2023–24	8	8.79
13	Wednesday 9:00 p.m.	22	September 25, 2024	5.60	May 21, 2025	5.61	2024–25		
14	Wednesday 9:00 p.m.	21	October 1, 2025	5.34	May 13, 2026	N/A	2025–26		
15	Wednesday 9:00 p.m.		October 7, 2026	5.13			2026–27		

== Spin-offs ==
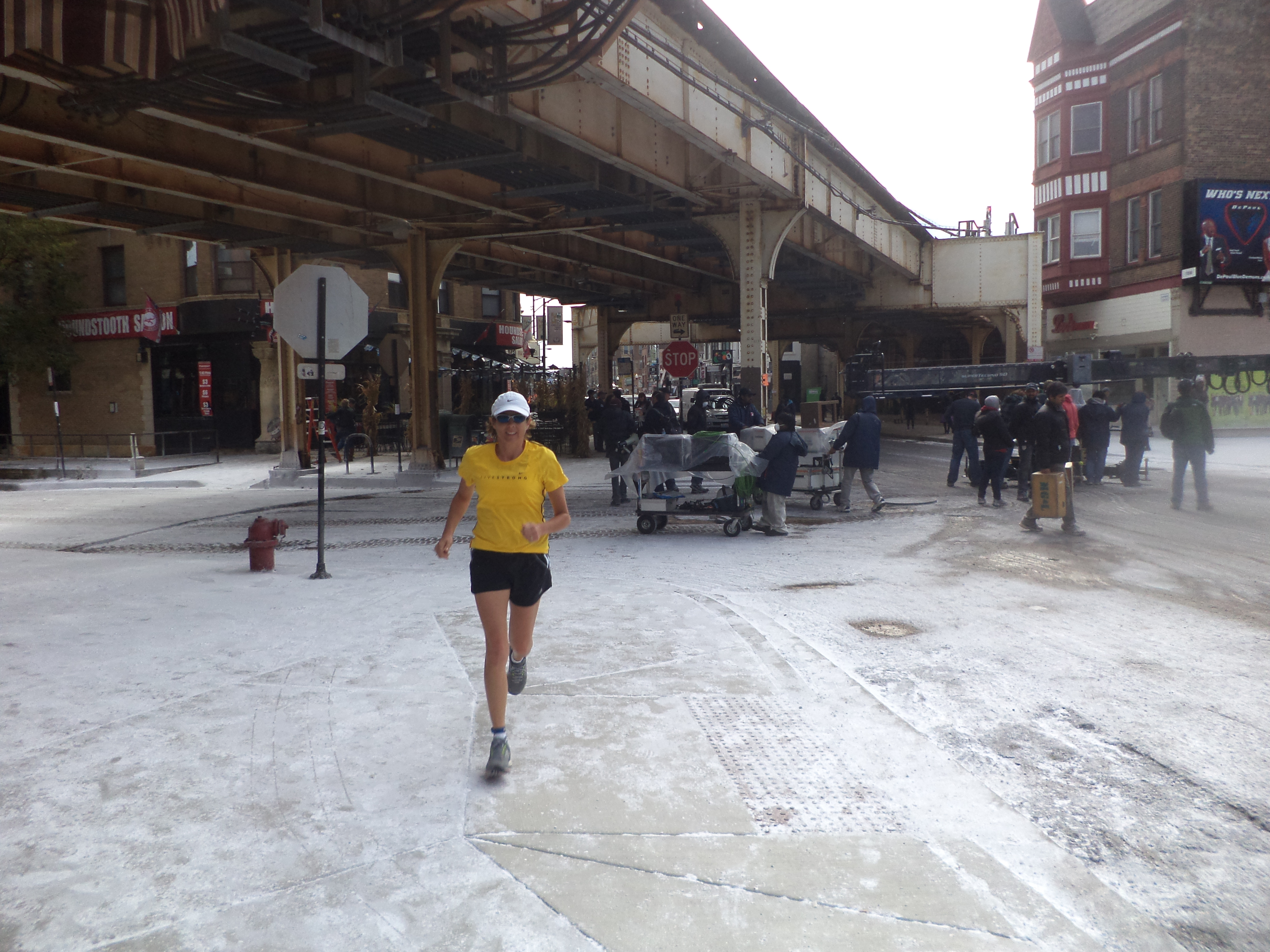
A jogger runs past Chicago Fire filming on location

On March 27, 2013, NBC announced plans for a proposed spin-off of Chicago Fire, the police procedural drama Chicago P.D. that would involve the Chicago Police Department, the spin-off series being created and produced by Dick Wolf, with Derek Haas, Michael Brandt, and Matt Olmstead serving as executive producers. It premiered on January 8, 2014.

The show follows an Intelligence Unit of the police and is filmed entirely in Chicago. The main cast includes Jason Beghe, Jon Seda, Sophia Bush, Jesse Lee Soffer, Patrick Flueger, Elias Koteas, Marina Squerciati, LaRoyce Hawkins and Archie Kao.

In February 2015, NBC announced plans to make another spin-off, the medical drama Chicago Med. A special backdoor pilot episode of the show aired during Chicago Fire's third season. On May 1, 2015, Chicago Med was officially ordered to a series, starring Oliver Platt, S. Epatha Merkerson, Nick Gehlfuss, Yaya DaCosta, Torrey DeVitto, Rachel DiPillo, Marlyne Barrett, Colin Donnell and Brian Tee. It premiered on November 17, 2015.

Chicago Fire was the first show of what would become the Chicago franchise. Additionally, Chicago P.D. aired a backdoor pilot of the short-lived legal drama series Chicago Justice, which ran from March 1, to May 14, 2017.

== Broadcast and streaming ==
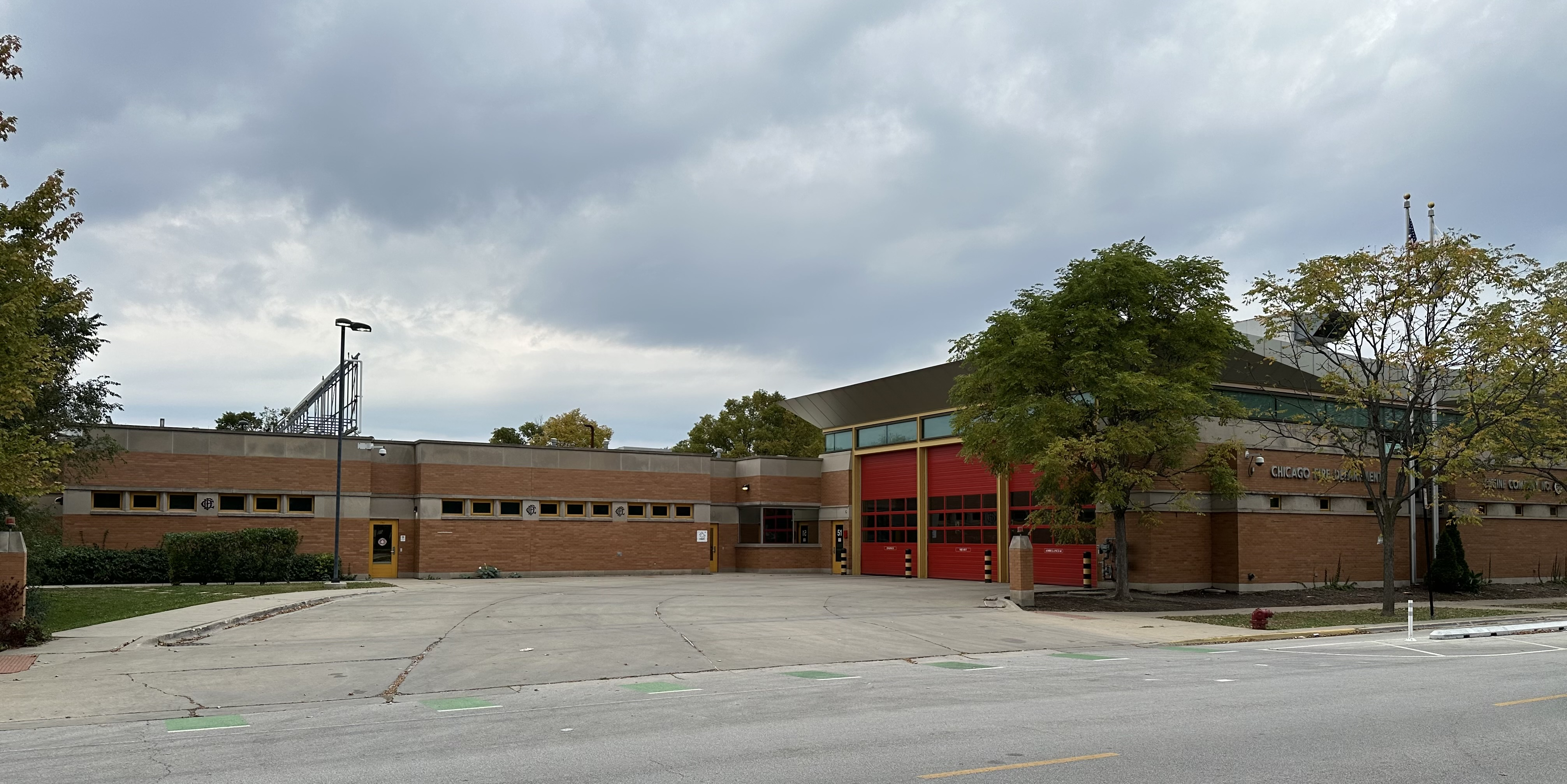
Another view of the fictional Engine 51

Chicago Fire is broadcast by NBC in the United States. The latest five episodes of Chicago Fire are available on Hulu with a subscription. Season 4 is available on NBC.com and the NBC app with a cable subscription. All episodes are available from electronic sell-through platforms such as iTunes, Amazon Instant Video, and Vudu. The series is available for streaming on Peacock along with Chicago P.D., Chicago Med, Law & Order, Law & Order: Special Victims Unit and Law & Order: Criminal Intent.

In Canada, the series aired on Global for seven seasons, then moved to Citytv.

In Malaysia, the series aired on PRIMEtime for eight seasons, then moved to HITS Now.

In the United Kingdom and Ireland, the series airs as part of the One Chicago block 8pm through 11pm. Earlier seasons were shown on the now defunct Universal channel before moving to Sky Witness. All episodes are available +7 days and on demand.

=== Syndication ===
Ion Television has acquired the off-network rights to air the series. Episodes began airing in June 2021. MyNetworkTV also acquired the off-network rights to air the series. Episodes began airing in September 2021. Fellow NBCUniversal network USA also acquired the off-network rights to air the series. Episodes began airing in January 2022.

== Awards and nominations ==
Awards and nominations for Chicago Fire
Year	Award	Category	Nominee(s)	Result
2013	ASCAP Film and Television Music Awards	Top Television Series	Chicago Fire	Won
2013	Imagen Foundation Awards	Best Actress/Television	Monica Raymund	Won
2013	Imagen Foundation Awards	Best Primetime Television Program	Chicago Fire	Nominated
2013	Imagen Foundation Awards	Best Actor/Television	Joe Minoso	Nominated
2013	Online Film & Television Association	Best Sound in a Series	Jeffery Kaplan, Todd Morrissey, Peter Reale, Alex Riordan	Nominated
2013	Prism Awards	Best Drama Episode – "Professional Courtesey"	Chicago Fire	Won
2013	Teen Choice Awards	Choice TV Show: Action	Chicago Fire	Nominated
2013	Teen Choice Awards	Choice TV Actor: Action	Jesse Spencer	Nominated
2013	Teen Choice Awards	Choice TV Actress: Action	Monica Raymund	Nominated
2014	Imagen Foundation Awards	Best Supporting Actor/Television	Joe Minoso	Nominated
2014	Imagen Foundation Awards	Best Supporting Actress/Television	Monica Raymund	Nominated
2014	People's Choice Awards	Favorite Network TV Drama	Chicago Fire	Nominated
2015	Imagen Foundation Awards	Best Supporting Actor/Television	Joe Minoso	Nominated
2015	Imagen Foundation Awards	Best Supporting Actress/Television	Monica Raymund	Nominated
2015	People's Choice Awards	Favorite Network TV Drama	Chicago Fire	Nominated
2015	People's Choice Awards	Favorite Dramatic TV Actor	Taylor Kinney	Nominated
2015	People's Choice Awards	Favorite TV Character We Miss Most	Lauren German	Nominated
2015	Prism Awards	Drama Series Multi-Episode Storyline – Mental Health	Chicago Fire	Won
2016	People's Choice Awards	Favorite Dramatic TV Actor	Taylor Kinney	Won
2016	Prism Awards	Drama Series Multi-Episode Storyline – Substance Use	Chicago Fire	Nominated
2016	Imagen Foundation Awards	Best Supporting Actor/Television	Joe Minoso	Nominated
2016	Imagen Foundation Awards	Best Supporting Actress/Television	Monica Raymund	Nominated
2017	People's Choice Awards	Favorite Network TV Drama	Chicago Fire	Nominated
2017	People's Choice Awards	Favorite Dramatic TV Actor	Taylor Kinney	Nominated
2017	Imagen Foundation Awards	Best Primetime Television Program – Drama	Chicago Fire	Nominated
2017	Imagen Foundation Awards	Best Supporting Actor – Television	Joe Minoso	Nominated
2024	People's Choice Awards	The Drama Show of the Year	Chicago Fire	Nominated
