= John L. Roman =

American television and film producer

John L. Roman is an American television and film producer. His major credits include Chicago Fire (2012–2014), Law & Order: Criminal Intent (2001–2010) and Deadline (2000–2001).

== Education ==
Roman studied Communications and Theater at Oakland University.

== Career ==
Roman worked as an assistant director on Groundhog Day, Backdraft, Gunsmoke: The Long Ride, Gladiator and The Untouchables.

== Filmography ==
Television

- Chicago Fire (46 episodes, 2012-2014)
- Eden (Pilot) 2011
- Law & Order: Criminal Intent (180 episodes, 2001 - 2010)
- Conviction (1 episode, 2006)
- Deadline (13 episodes, 2000-2001)
- D.C. (7 episodes, 2000)
- The Untouchables (1993)
- Gabriel's Fire (1990)

Television Movies

- Exiled (1998)
- Every Mother's Worst Fear (1998)
- Daughters (1997)
- The Perfect Daughter (1996)
- The Crying Child (1996)
- The Kid Who Loved Christmas (1990)
- The Haunting of Sarah Hardy (1989)

Film

- Groundhog Day (1993)
- Folks! (1992)
- Straight Talk (1992)
- Gladiator (1992)
- Backdraft (1991)
- Only the Lonely (1991)

== Personal life ==
As of December 2014, Roman resides in Los Angeles, California.
