= Exiled: A Law & Order Movie =

American TV movie

- Region 1 American DVD Cover
- Genre: Police procedural
- Based on: Law & Order by Dick Wolf
- Written by: Charles Kipps
- Story by: Charles Kipps; Chris Noth
- Directed by: Jean de Segonzac
- Starring: Chris Noth; Dabney Coleman; Dana Eskelson; John Fiore; Dann Florek; Paul Guilfoyle; Ice-T; Costas Mandylor; Tony Musante; Nicole Ari Parker; Benjamin Bratt; S. Epatha Merkerson; Jerry Orbach; Sam Waterston
- Theme music composer: Mike Post
- Country of origin: United States
- Original language: English

Production
- Executive producers: Dick Wolf; Charles Kipps
- Producers: John L. Roman; Judith Craig Marlin
- Cinematography: Glenn Kershaw
- Editor: Cindy Mollo
- Running time: 120 minutes (with commercials); 84 minutes (without commercials)
- Production companies: Studios USA Pictures; Spinnaker Films; Wolf Films

Original release
- Network: NBC
- Release: November 8, 1998

Exiled: A Law & Order Movie is a 1998 (two-hour-format) television film based on the police procedural and legal drama television series Law & Order. Written by Charles Kipps, from a story by Kipps and Chris Noth, and directed by Jean de Segonzac, the film originally aired on NBC on November 8, 1998. The film revolves around Noth's character, Detective Mike Logan. Kipps received a 1999 Edgar Award for his screenplay. It would also mark the debut of Ice-T as an actor in the Law & Order universe, though he would not play his renowned Law & Order Special Victims Unit character for the film.

== Plot ==
Detective Mike Logan has been reassigned to the Domestic Disputes Department on Staten Island following an assault on Kevin Crossley after the latter's acquittal, (Note: As depicted in the Season 5 finale "Pride" (1995) in Law & Order, which was Chris Noth's final appearance in that series.) a job he considers to be a "career dead-end". Three years later, a resentful and isolated Logan unexpectedly becomes involved in a homicide case when, after an altercation with his partner while handling a call to a domestic dispute, Logan's supervisor reassigns him to work with Staten Island homicide detective Frankie Silvera to investigate the murder of the girl, whose body Logan encountered earlier when she was found dead in New York Harbor. The victim was found to have been stabbed and her hands cut off.

After discovering that the victim had been a dancer at an exotic club in Manhattan owned by Gianni Uzielli, son of mafia godfather Don Giancarlo Uzielli, Logan meets with his former supervisor Captain Donald Cragen, who advises him that the case may involve a dirty-cop conspiracy leading back to the 27th Precinct, the very precinct from which Logan was banished. Logan's commanding officer repeatedly orders him to leave the case to the "real detectives" in the NYPD, but Logan sees solving the case as the long-hoped-for chance to resurrect his career and get reinstated as a homicide detective. He visits Executive Assistant District Attorney Jack McCoy, and convinces McCoy to authorize a cross-jurisdictional investigation.

Logan also becomes romantically involved with the victim's twin sister, a ballet dancer. Logan is shot at by a mystery assailant, whom he believes must be the murderer he is closing in on. Logan also suspects that Detective Sammy Kurtz is the dirty cop, but ultimately finds that it was Detective Tony Profaci who had long been on the take from the Uzielli family, and that Profaci had helped Gianni dispose of the girl's body after the latter had murdered her for refusing to abort a pregnancy of which Gianni was the father. Logan and Silvera go to the Staten Island home of Giancarlo Uzielli, who has decided to turn over his son for breaking the mafia's rules by attempting to assassinate a cop. Enraged, Gianni grabs a gun and shoots his father dead before being subdued and taken away by the police. The film ends with Logan walking down a Manhattan street while news reports detail the botched arrest of Gianni Uzielli.

== Cast ==
- Chris Noth as Detective Mike Logan
- Dabney Coleman as Lieutenant Dennis Stolper
- Dana Eskelson as Detective Frankie Silvera
- John Fiore as Detective Tony Profaci
- Dann Florek as Captain Don Cragen
- Jerry Orbach as Detective Lennie Briscoe
- Benjamin Bratt as Detective Rey Curtis
- S. Epatha Merkerson as Lieutenant Anita Van Buren
- Sam Waterston as Executive Assistant District Attorney Jack McCoy
- Costas Mandylor as Gianni, Don Giancarlo Uzielli's son
- Tony Musante as Don Giancarlo Uzielli
- Ice-T as Kingston
- Paul Guilfoyle as Detective Sammy Kurtz
- Nicole Ari Parker as Georgeanne Taylor
- Leslie Hendrix as Dr. Elizabeth Rodgers

Rapper-turned-actor Ice-T, who appears in this film as a pimp, later joined the cast of Law & Order: Special Victims Unit as Detective Odafin Tutuola.

Dana Eskelson, who played Logan's partner, was later featured as a suspect in season three of Law & Order: Criminal Intent. Eskelson was also featured in two episodes of Law & Order: Special Victims Unit, once as a rape victim in season four and again as the mother of a victim of molestation in season seven.

Paul Guilfoyle from CBS's CSI: Crime Scene Investigation portrays of the detectives working under Van Buren. Guilfoyle had previously appeared in the pilot episode of Law & Order, "Everybody's Favorite Bagman", as murder suspect Tony Scalisi.

Dabney Coleman, portraying Logan's boss Lieutenant Stolper, later appeared in a 2009 Law & Order: Special Victims Unit episode, "Snatched", as Frank Hager, a career criminal.

== Home media ==
First released in 2011 by Boulevard Entertainment as a region 0 DVD in widescreen but with no subtitles or extra features. Universal Studios Home Entertainment released this title on a region 1 DVD on June 12, 2012. The film was not however included in the Law & Order: The Complete Series DVD box set released on November 8, 2011.
