= Brandon Larracuente =

American actor (born 1994)

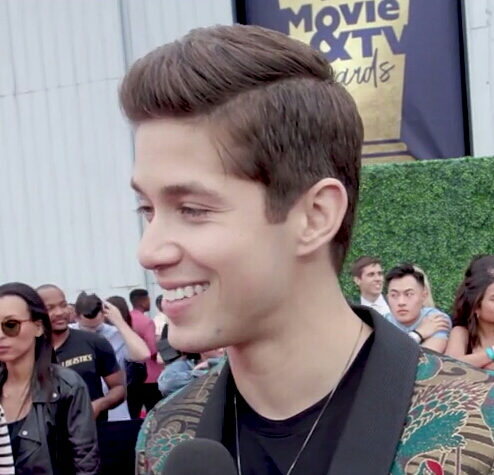
- Larracuente in 2018
- Born: Brandon A. Larracuente; November 16, 1994 (age 31); Pleasantville, New York, U.S.
- Occupation: Actor
- Years active: 2008–present
- Spouse: Jazmin Garcia (m. 2020)

Brandon A. Larracuente (born November 16, 1994) is an American actor known for his roles in Bloodline, 13 Reasons Why, and the Freeform drama series Party of Five. In 2022, he had a recurring role on the sixth season of the medical drama series The Good Doctor.

== Personal life ==
Brandon Larracuente was born in Pleasantville, New York. He is of Puerto Rican descent. At the age of four, he was introduced to theater when asked to be a part of two operas at the New Rochelle Opera House. He began acting at the age of eight, where he starred in an Off Broadway show called Desire. Upon relocating to Florida, he starred in Charlie and the Chocolate Factory and It's a Wonderful Life at Orlando Family Stage (then Orlando REP). He has been married to Jazmin Garcia since 2020.

== Filmography ==
=== Film ===
| Year | Title | Role | Notes |
|---|---|---|---|
| 2011 | Missing 24 Hours | Christopher | |
| 2016 | Max Steel | Attentive Kid | |
| 2017 | Baywatch | Skateboarder #1 | |
| 2017 | Bright | Mike | |
| 2019 | Confessional | Zach Turner | |
| 2020 | What We Found | Clay Howard | |

=== Television ===
| Year | Title | Role | Notes |
|---|---|---|---|
| 2013 | The Glades | Kid | Episode: "Happy Trails" |
| 2014 | Every Witch Way | Joshua | Episode: "The Big Chill" |
| 2014 | Constantine | Mateo Lopez | Episode: "The Saint of Last Resorts" |
| 2015–2017 | Bloodline | Ben Rayburn | 18 episodes |
| 2017–2018 | 13 Reasons Why | Jeff Atkins | 7 episodes |
| 2020 | Party of Five | Emilio Acosta | Main role |
| 2022 | The Rookie | Thackeray Bloomfield | Episode: "Backstabbers" |
| 2022–2024 | The Good Doctor | Dr. Daniel "Danny" Perez | Main role (Season 6), guest (Season 7); 20 episodes |
| 2025 | On Call | Officer Alex Diaz | Main role |
| 2025 | St. Denis Medical | Will | Episode: "Sometimes It's Good to Be Cautious" |
| 2025 | Chicago Fire | Sal Vasquez | Main role (season 14) |
