= Jocelyn Hudon =

Canadian actress

- Born: November 18, 1994 (age 31); Canada
- Occupation: Actress
- Years active: 2015–present
- Spouse: Jake Manley (m. 2021)

Jocelyn Hudon (born November 18, 1994) is a Canadian actress.

== Early life and education ==
Hudon trained at the National Ballet School of Canada.

== Career ==
She started her acting career in 2015 and is known for her roles in shows such as The Strain, Dave, and Chicago Fire, where she portrays paramedic Lizzie Novak.

== Personal life ==
Met her husband at mutual acting coach's party.

== Filmography ==
=== Film ===
Year	Title	Role	Notes
2015	Pixels	Cyber Chick	
2016	Below Her Mouth	Model / Nikki	
2021	Safer at Home	Jen	Starring role
2022	V for Vengeance	Emma	Starring role
2022	Sniper: Rogue Mission	Mary Jane	
2024	The Fall	Lacey Huxley	Starring role
2024	Dead Money	Kelly	
2025	The Sound	Dana Watkins	

=== Television ===
Year	Title	Role	Notes
2015	Single Ladies	Melia	Episode: "Consequences"
2015	Good Witch	Stacy	Episode: "Good Witch Halloween"
2015	Lost Girl	Victoria	2 episodes
2016	Slasher	Young Brenda	Episode: "Like as Fire Eateth Up and Burneth Wood"
2016	Four in the Morning	Milkshake Girl	Episode: "The Music"
2016	Gangland Undercover	Young Christine	Episode: "In-laws and Outlaws"
2016–2017	Incorporated	Amelia	
2017	Love Locks	Alexa	TV movie
2017	The Christmas Cure	Shelly	TV movie
2017	The Strain	Abby	5 episodes
2017	21 Thunder	Becka Jolie	6 episodes
2017	Christmas Wedding Planner	Kelsey	TV movie, starring role
2018	Ice	Willow	10 episodes
2018	Frankie Drake Mysteries	Audrey Smith	Episode: "The Last Dance"
2018–2019	When Calls the Heart	Grace Bennett	3 episodes
2019	From Friend to Fiancé	Jessica Parks	TV movie, starring role
2019	The Order	Ruby	2 episodes
2019	Ransom	Natasha	Episode: "Prima"
2019	Eat, Drink & Be Married	Billie	TV movie, starring role
2019	When Hope Calls	Grace Bennett	10 episodes
2020	Criminal Minds	Elizabeth Wise	Episode: "Saturday"
2020	9-1-1	Tiffany	Episode: "The Taking of Dispatch 9-1-1"
2021	One of a Kind Love	Kyra Tally	TV movie, starring role
2021	Baby, It's Cold Inside	Hannah	TV movie, starring role
2022	The Rookie: Feds	Katie Windsor	Episode: "Star Crossed"
2022	Acapulco	Kelly	2 episodes
2023	Love in the Maldives	Rae Parker	TV movie, starring role
2023	Dave	Campbell	Episode: "Texas"
2023	The Irrational	Camille Lawson	Episode: "Lucky Charms"
2024	Romance with a Twist	Luna	TV movie, starring role
2024	Falling in Love in Niagara	Madeline	TV movie, starring role
2024–present	Chicago Fire	Paramedic Lizzie Novak	Recurring (season 12), Main role (seasons 13-14)
2025–2026	Chicago Med	Paramedic Lizzie Novak	
2026	Chicago P.D.	Paramedic Lizzie Novak	

=== Short ===
Year	Title	Role	Notes
2018	Stories We Tell Ourselves	Vanessa	Starring role
2024	Inclusive Space	Corinna	Starring role
