= Daniel Kyri =

American actor

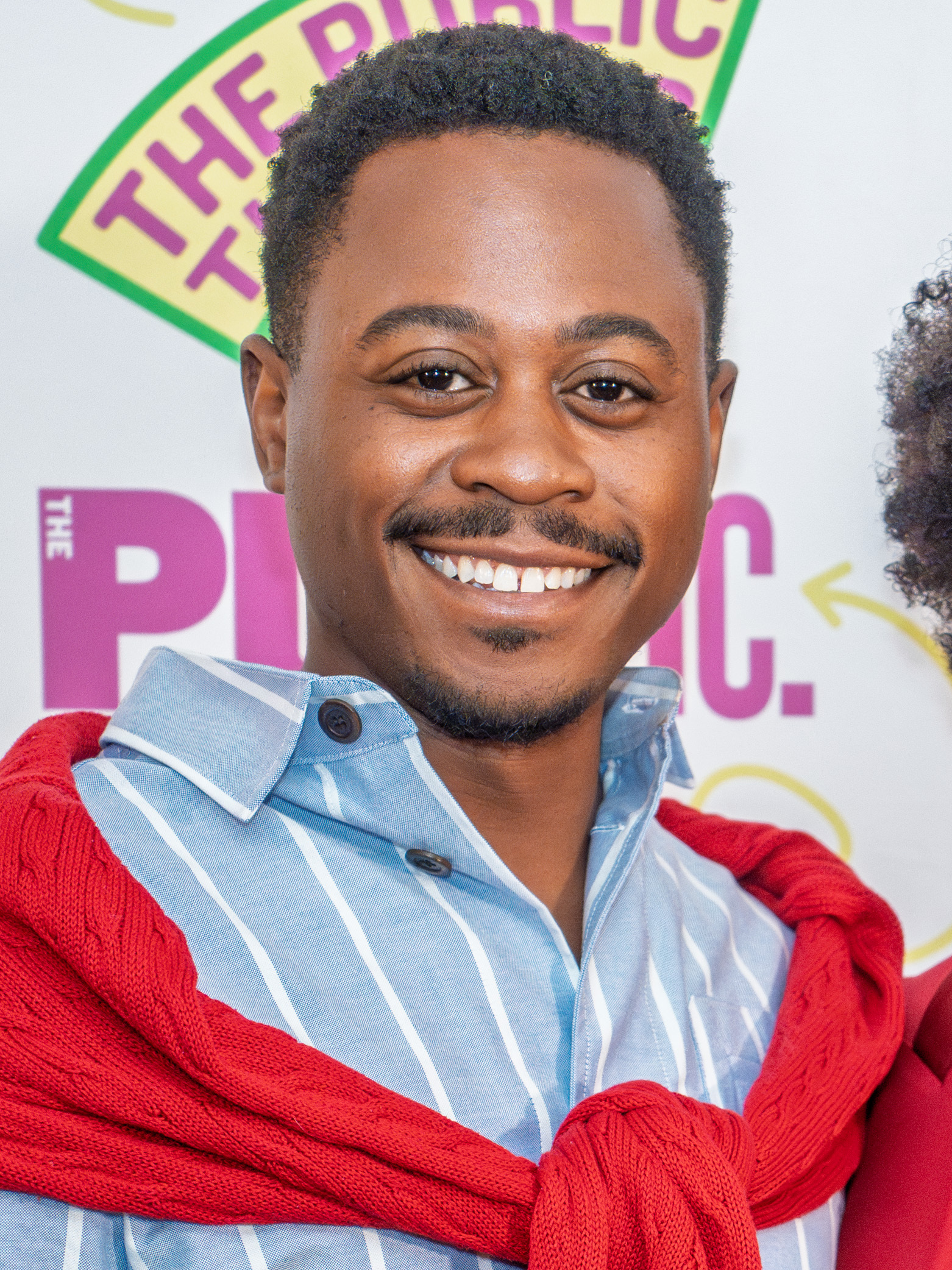
- Daniel Kryi at the 2025 Tribeca Festival
- Born: October 10, 1995 (age 31); Chicago, Illinois, U.S.
- Other name: D.K.
- Education: University of Chicago (BA)
- Years active: 2007–present
- Known for: Darren Ritter in Chicago Fire
- Website: danielkyri.com

Daniel Kyri (born October 10, 1995) is an American actor best known for portraying Darren Ritter on Chicago Fire.

== Early life and education ==
Kyri grew up on the South Side of Chicago. He performed in plays as a child, crediting his mother for his love of the arts and enrolling him in the After School Matters program when he was 13. In 2007, he appeared in the controversial CBS reality show Kid Nation when he was 14 years old, going by the name D.K. He won a $20,000 "gold star" awarded by his peers.

Kyri attended the University of Illinois at Chicago, graduating with a BA degree in Theater Performance.

== Career ==
Kyri starred in the 2014 short film Perfect Day as Desmond, a composite character based on Derrion Albert. He had roles in Chicago theater productions including Moby Dick, Macbeth and Ms. Blakk for President. In 2015, he portrayed Logan in the film Henry Gamble's Birthday Party, and Brock in the TV mini-series Saranormal. In 2017, he was nominated for a Joseph Jefferson Equity Award for Principal Actor in a Play for Objects in the Mirror at the Goodman Theatre.

In 2018, Kyri had the title role in the Gift Theatre production of Hamlet, giving what the Chicago Tribune called "a standout performance." With Bea Cordelia, he co-wrote and starred in a web series called The T about the relationship between a white trans woman and a Black queer man in Chicago. It premiered with a screening at the Chicago Cultural Center.

Kyri is best known for playing Darren Ritter on Chicago Fire. He auditioned for Chicago Fire in 2018, with the role of Ritter initially intended to last 2-3 episodes. He was a recurring guest appearing in most episodes over the next two years, before being promoted to series regular in August 2020. He played in 133 episodes over eight years in seasons 7 through 14.

Kyri has a role as a YouTube paranormal investigator in the 2022 Shudder lo-fi horror film Night's End.

== Personal life ==
Kyri identifies as queer. He has said, "I can't say I had very many examples, of Black queer people growing up ... I spent a lot of my youth lost at sea, reconciling with my sexuality."

== Filmography ==
=== Film ===
Year	Title	Role	Notes
2014	Perfect Day	Desmond	Short film
2015	Unexpected	David	Uncredited
2015	Henry Gamble's Birthday Party	Logan	
2019	Mantoru	Young Warrior	Short film
2020	The Thing About Harry	Volunteer	Television film
2020	Killing Eleanor	Will	
2022	Night's End	Dark Corners	

=== Television ===
Year	Title	Role	Notes
2007	Kid Nation	Himself	Reality show
2017	Sarahnormal	Brock	
2018	Chicago Med	Lane Tucker	Episode: "Devil in Disguise"
2018	The T	Carter	6 episodes
2018–2025	Chicago Fire	Darren Ritter	133 episodes
2019	Chicago P.D.	Darren Ritter	Episode: "Infection, Part III"
2020	Acting for a Cause	Mika	Episode: "Hit the Wall"

== Awards and honors ==
- Chicago Reader Best Actor 2017
- Windy City Times 30 under 30
