= Joe Miñoso =

American actor (born 1978)

- Born: September 25, 1978 (age 48); The Bronx, New York, U.S.
- Occupation: Actor
- Years active: 2005–present
- Spouse: Caitlin Murphy Miles (m. 2016)

Joe Miñoso (born September 25, 1978) is an American theater and television actor. He currently stars in NBC's Chicago Fire.

== Early life ==
He saw his first girlfriend in a school play at Lincoln High School where she took him backstage and he decided that he wanted to be involved in acting. Minoso joined the stage crew, eventually auditioning for a role in their production of Dracula the following year. He graduated from Adelphi University with a bachelor's degree in fine arts, and Northern Illinois University with a Master's in fine arts.

== Career ==
Joe Miñoso worked extensively in the theater prior to his television and film appearances. He worked at Chicago's Teatro Vista, the largest Latino theater company in the Midwest.

== Personal life ==
Prior to Chicago Fire, Joe Miñoso lived on the North Side of Chicago. During filming for Chicago Fire, Miñoso lived with co-stars Charlie Barnett and Yuri Sardarov. On October 16, 2016, Miñoso married Chicago Fire make up artist Caitlin Murphy Miles.

== Filmography ==
=== Film ===
Year	Title	Role	Notes
2010	Polish Bar	Jose	Minor role
2011	The Return of Joe Rich	Bernard	Main role
2013	Man of Steel	Metropolis Policeman	Minor role

=== Television ===
Year	Title	Role	Notes
2005	Prison Break	Chaz Fink	Episode: English, Fitz or Percy
2009	The Beast	Dennis	Episode: Counterfeit
2011	Shameless	Hector Aquilar	Episode: Killer Carl
2011	The Chicago Code	Task Force Officer / Officer Sanchez	2 episodes
2011	Boss	Moco Ruiz	4 episodes
2012–2026	Chicago Fire	Joe Cruz	Main role
2014–2019	Chicago P.D.	Joe Cruz	Recurring role; 8 episodes
2016–2023	Chicago Med	Joe Cruz	Recurring role; 8 episodes
2017–2019	Get Shorty	Hector	2 episodes

=== Shorts ===
Year	Title	Role	Notes
2009	October Surprise	Metropolis Policeman	Real Yelburton
