= Miranda Rae Mayo =

American actress

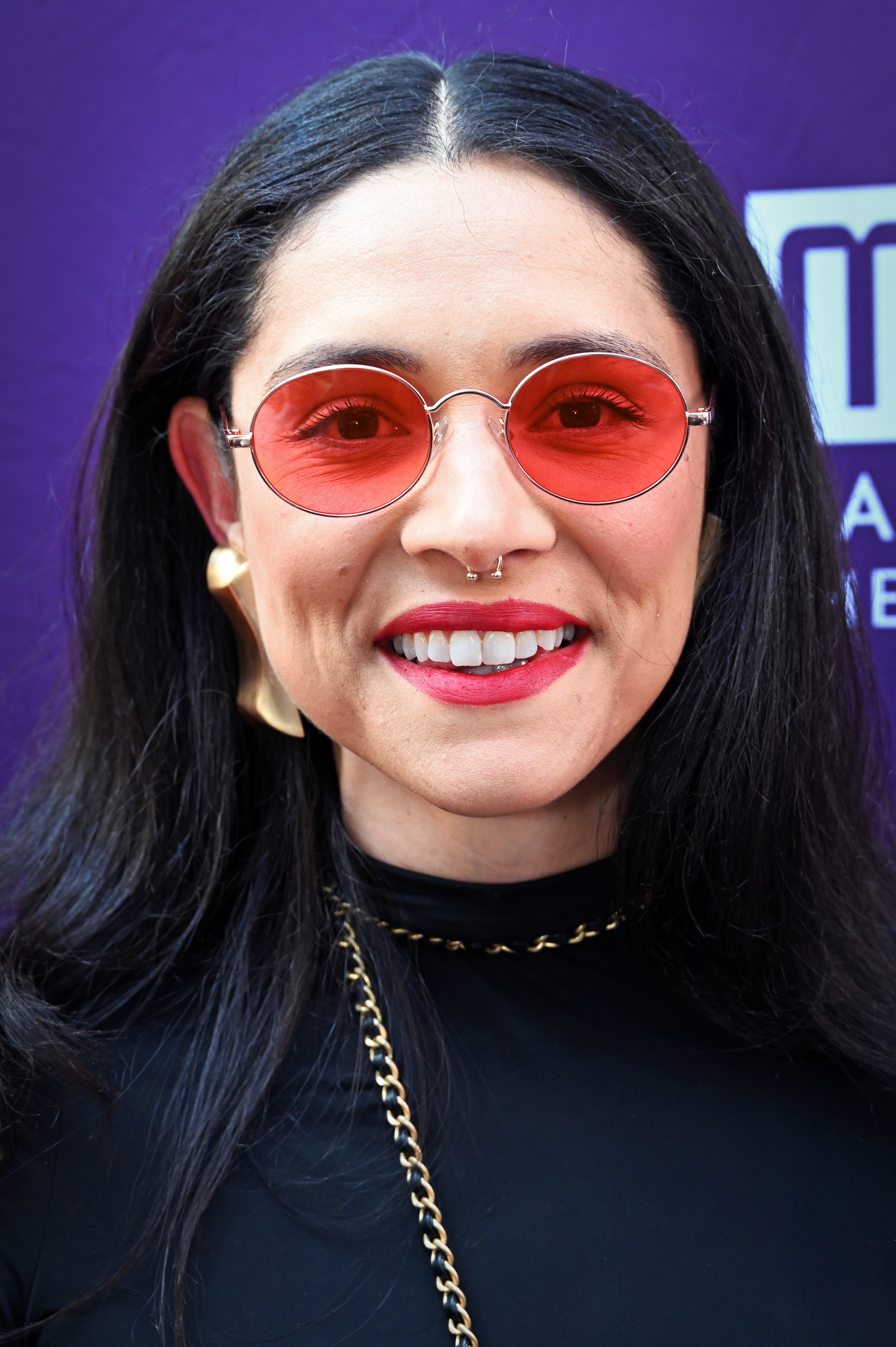
- Mayo in 2026
- Born: Fresno, California, U.S.
- Occupation: Actress
- Years active: 2011–present
- Known for: Blood & Oil; Chicago Fire

Miranda Rae Mayo is an American television actress. She starred as Lacey Briggs on Blood & Oil (2015) and has appeared on Chicago Fire as Stella Kidd since 2016.

== Life and career ==
Mayo was born in Fresno, California, and began her acting career appearing in the local stage productions and at her high school Roosevelt High School. She relocated to Los Angeles and began a modeling career before making her television debut. In 2011, Mayo guest-starred in an episode of the short-lived NBC police series, Law & Order: LA.

In 2013, she had a recurring role in the BET comedy series The Game. The following year she joined the cast of Days of Our Lives as Zoe Browning. She appeared on the show on a recurring basis from August 2014 to July 2015. In early 2015, Mayo had the recurring role as Talia Sandoval during the fifth season of the Freeform teen drama series Pretty Little Liars.

In 2015 she appeared in the second season of the HBO anthology crime series True Detective, and was cast in the recurring role of the Showtime drama series The Affair as the new love interest of Joshua Jackson's character. In the same year, Mayo was cast in the series regular role in the ABC prime time soap opera Blood & Oil as Lacey Briggs, the daughter of oil tycoon Hap Briggs (Don Johnson).

In 2016, she joined the cast of Chicago Fire playing Stella Kidd, a new firefighter.

In 2021, Mayo graduated from the Somatica Institute training as a sex and relationship coach. She was cast as one of the Institute's founders in the TV series Here She Comes, where she was also an executive producer.

She is queer and uses she/her and they/them pronouns.

== Filmography ==
=== Film ===
Year	Title	Role	Notes
2011	Inside	Emma Hickox	
2012	How Your P*ssy Works		Short film
2014	The Black Bachelor		Short film
2015	We Are Your Friends	Courtney	Uncredited
2015	The Girl in the Photographs	Rose	
2025	Going Places	Jules	

=== Television ===
Year	Title	Role	Notes
2011	Law & Order: LA	Anna	Episode: "El Sereno"
2011	Supah Ninjas	Assistant	Episode: "The Magnificent"
2013	The Game	Patreece Sheibani	Recurring role; 5 episodes
2013	American Caravan		Unaired reality television series
2013—2015	Days of Our Lives	Zoe Browning	Regular role; 15 episodes
2015	Stuck!	Brooke	Main role; 9 episodes
2015	Pretty Little Liars	Talia Sandoval	Recurring role; 7 episodes
2015	True Detective	Vera Machiado	Recurring role; 2 episodes
2015	Blood & Oil	Lacey Briggs	Main role; 10 episodes
2016–present	Chicago Fire	Stella Kidd	Recurring role (season 4), Main role (season 5–present); 96 episodes
2018, 2025	Chicago Med	Stella Kidd	2 episodes
2019, 2025	Chicago P.D.	Stella Kidd	2 episodes
