= Hanako Greensmith =

American actress (born 1996)

- Born: November 11, 1996 (age 29); New York City, New York, U.S.
- Occupation: Actress
- Years active: 2018–present

Hanako Greensmith (born November 11, 1996) is an American actress. She is best known for playing paramedic Violet Mikami in the drama series Chicago Fire.

== Early life ==
Greensmith was born in New York City on November 11, 1996, to classical cellist Clive Greensmith and violinist Chizuko Ishikawa. She lived in many different areas as a child such as Dobbs Ferry. She initially wanted to become a nurse but realized she did not have the skills. She graduated from Pace University in 2018 with a BFA in Musical Theater.

== Career ==
Early on in her career she made appearances in the drama series Bull and the crime drama series FBI. She is best known for playing paramedic Violet Mikami in the drama series Chicago Fire. She was originally intended to make only a guest appearance but became a recurring character in season 9, before becoming a series regular in season 10.

== Filmography ==
=== Film ===
| Year | Title | Role | Notes |
|---|---|---|---|
| 2019 | Cave XR | Ayara | Short |

=== Television ===
| Year | Title | Role | Notes |
|---|---|---|---|
| 2018 | Bull | Veronica Hill | Episode: Excessive Force |
| 2019 | FBI | Bonnie Snow | Episode: Appearances |
| 2021–2025 | Chicago Med | Violet Mikami | 3 episodes |
| 2020–Present | Chicago Fire | Violet Mikami | 92 episodes |
