= DuShon Monique Brown =

American actress

- Born: November 30, 1968; Chicago, Illinois, U.S.
- Died: March 23, 2018 (aged 49); Olympia Fields, Illinois, U.S.
- Education: Governors State University
- Occupation: Actress
- Years active: 2003–2018
- Notable work: Prison Break; Chicago Fire
- Height: 5 ft 10 in (178 cm)
- Children: 1

DuShon Monique Brown (November 30, 1968 – March 23, 2018) was an American actress known for her performances as Nurse Katie Welch on the Fox series Prison Break and Connie in the NBC series Chicago Fire from 2012 until her death in 2018.

== Early life and education ==
Brown was born in Chicago on November 30, 1968, to Zachary M. Brown and Liz Colburn. She was a graduate of Whitney M. Young Magnet High School and Governors State University, with a master's degree in school counseling. Brown previously worked at Chicago's South Shore International College Preparatory High School as the guidance counselor, and at Kenwood Academy High School as a crisis counselor and drama instructor.

== Career ==
=== Early career ===
Brown was active in theater in her hometown for many years. Her first performance on television was 2003's made-for-TV movie Skin Complex. From 2005 to 2007, she was on Prison Break. Brown appeared in 2011's The Dilemma in an uncredited role. Brown was in 2012's romantic comedy One Small Hitch.

=== Chicago Fire ===
In 2012, Brown began playing the recurring role of Connie on Chicago Fire. Of her time on the TV show, Brown said in an interview with Hidden Remote, "She was a secretary and had a single speech. But I auditioned because it was a new series in Chicago Fire and had the possibility that she could become. She sees herself, especially with the younger members of the team, as a kind of mother, aunt, teacher. Eamonn and I, we play when I'm on the set that Connie is the boss's working wife and all the rest are her kids, they wrote Connie as that motherly figure that everyone seems to run away from. I'm just a goofy, geeky Chicagoan who plays the violin, likes karaoke, embraces the trees, loves to be appreciated for her work and dreams of playing a superhero in the movies." She was asked how she would feel about a spinoff called Chicago Ed or Chicago Shelter by reporter Andrew Crist, who noted Brown's master's degree in counseling and background in social work; Brown replied, "I’m there! If they pull that show out, I will be an actor and a consultant! Trust me."

=== Later career ===
Brown guest-starred in Boss in 2012 and Shameless in 2013. She was in 2015's Unexpected. Brown was also in 2015's A Light Beneath Their Feet. In 2015, she guest-starred on Empire. Brown guest-starred on Electric Dreams in 2017. Also in 2017, she was in the comedy film Surprise Me! written and directed by Nancy Goodman and based on the book of the same name by Goodman. Her last role was in 2017's made-for-TV movie Public Housing Unit.

== Personal life and death ==
Brown had one child: a daughter, Zoe. She had one brother and two sisters: Zachary Brown Jr., Zaire King, and Jamyra Siek. Brown checked herself into the hospital earlier in the week of her death, after experiencing chest pains, but was released after undergoing tests. She died at St. James Olympia Fields Hospital on March 23, 2018. The Cook County coroner scheduled an autopsy on March 24, 2018. On May 31, 2018, the Cook County Medical examiner confirmed the death was the result of sepsis of an unknown etiology.

== Filmography ==
=== Film ===
Year	Title	Role	Notes	Ref.
2011	The Dilemma	Weiner Circle Worker	Comedy-drama film directed by Ron Howard and written by Allan Loeb; Uncredited	
2012	One Small Hitch	Unflappable Nurse	Romantic comedy film directed by John Burgess and written by Dode B. Levenson	
2015	Unexpected	Principal Clements	Drama film directed & co–written by Kris Swanberg and Megan Mercier; Credited as DuShon Brown	
2015	A Light Beneath Their Feet	Cindy	Drama film directed by Valerie Weiss	
2017	Surprise Me!	Shirley	Comedy film written and directed by Nancy Goodman; Based on the book of the same name by Goodman	

=== Television ===
Year	Title	Role	Notes	Ref.
2003	Skin Complex	Laurie	Made-for-TV-movie directed by Jim Friedman and Brad Pruitt	
2005–07	Prison Break	Katie Welch	Recurring (season 1), guest (season 2)	
2012–18	Chicago Fire	Connie	Recurring	
2012	Boss	Large Inmate	Episodes: "Louder Than Words" (S 2:Ep 1); "Through and Through" (S 2:Ep 2)	
2013	Shameless	Teresa	Episode: "May I Trim Your Hedges?" (S 3:Ep 3)	
2015	Empire	Ilene	Episode: "Poor Yorick" (S 1:Ep 10); Credited as DuShon M. Brown	
2017	Electric Dreams	Peace Sergeant	Episode: "Kill All Others"	
2017	Public Housing Unit	Commander Roberta	Made-for-TV-movie directed by Daniel Willis	

=== Theatre ===
Venue	Title	Role	Notes	Ref.
Pegasus Players Theatre	For Her as a Piano	Mutha Ku/Dirk	September 30 – November 1, 2015	
Chicago Dramatists	Hope VI	Queenie	2009	
Piven Theatre Workshop	Because They Have No Words	Actor 3 and Others	May 11 – June 15, 2008; March 6 – April 11, 2010	
Victory Gardens Theater	Shoes	Miss Viola		
Drury Lane Theatre	Little Shop of Horrors	Ronette		
Lookingglass Theatre Company	Summertime	Barbara/Violinist		
Chicago Theatre	Love Child	Miss Fanny		
Goodman Theatre	The Amen Corner	Ensemble		
MPAACT	Christ T	Maximillian		
Steppenwolf Theatre Company	Division Street: America	Louise/Lois		
Apple Tree Theatre	Once on this Island	Mama Euralie		
Chicago Theatre	Journal of Ordinary Thought	Actress #2		
Chicago Theatre	Train is Comin	Maggie Porter		
Chicago Theatre	Shakin' the mess Outta Misery	Miss Corrine		
Steppenwolf Theatre Company	Our Town	Stage Manager		
Lifeline Theatre	Praying for Sheetrock	Mary/Belle/Louise		
ETA Creative Arts Foundation	This Far By Faith	Viola Benson		
