= List of Chicago Fire characters =

This is a list of fictional characters in the television series Chicago Fire. The article deals with the series' main, recurring, and minor characters.

== Main characters ==
=== Overview ===
| Name | Portrayed by | Seasons | | | | | | | | | | | | | | |
| Name | Portrayed by | 1 | 2 | 3 | 4 | 5 | 6 | 7 | 8 | 9 | 10 | 11 | 12 | 13 | 14 | 15 |
|---|---|---|---|---|---|---|---|---|---|---|---|---|---|---|---|---|
| Matthew Casey | Jesse Spencer | Main (Note: Through episode 5 of season 10. Credited as "Special Guest Star" in the tenth-season finale episode.) | | | | | | | | | | Guest | | | | |
| Kelly Severide | Taylor Kinney | Main | | | | | | | | | | | | | | |
| Gabriela Dawson | Monica Raymund | Main | | | | | | Guest | | | | | | | | |
| Leslie Shay | Lauren German | Main | | Guest | | | | | | | | | | | | |
| Peter Mills | Charlie Barnett | Main | | | | | | | | | | | | | | |
| Christopher Herrmann | David Eigenberg | Main (Note: Received main billing only in the episodes in which they appeared during season 1.) | | | | | | | | | | | | | | |
| Dr. Hallie Thomas | Teri Reeves | Main | | | | | | | | | | | | | | |
| Wallace Boden | Eamonn Walker | Main | | | | | | | | | | | | Guest | | |
| Brian "Otis" Zvonecek | Yuri Sardarov | Recurring | Main (Note: Episode 1 of season 8 only.) | | | | | | | | | | | | | |
| Randall "Mouch" McHolland | Christian Stolte | Recurring | Main | | | | | | | | | | | | | |
| Joe Cruz | Joe Minoso | Recurring | Main | | | | | | | | | | | | | |
| Sylvie Brett | Kara Killmer | | | Main (Note: Credited as a Series regular until the sixth episode of the twelfth season.) | | | | | | | | | | | | |
| Jessica "Chili" Chilton | Dora Madison | | | Guest | Main (Note: Episodes 1–14 only.) | | | | | | | | | | | |
| Jimmy Borelli | Steven R. McQueen | | | | Main (Note: Episodes 1–2 of season 5 only.) | | | | | | | | | | | |
| Stella Kidd | Miranda Rae Mayo | | | | Recurring | Main | | | | | | | | | | |
| Emily Foster | Annie Ilonzeh | | | | | | | Main | | | | | | | | |
| Blake Gallo | Alberto Rosende | | | | | | | | Main (Note: Episode 1 of season 12 only.) | | | | | | | |
| Darren Ritter | Daniel Kyri | | | | | | | Recurring | | Main (Note: Episodes 1–2 of season 14 only.) | | | | | | |
| Gianna Mackey | Adriyan Rae | | | | | | | | | Main (Note: Through episode 9.) | | | | | | |
| Violet Mikami | Hanako Greensmith | | | | | | | | Recurring | | Main | | | | | |
| Sam Carver | Jake Lockett | | | | | | | | | | | Recurring | | Main | Guest | |
| Lyla Novak | Jocelyn Hudon | | | | | | | | | | | | Recurring | Main | | |
| Dom Pascal | Dermot Mulroney | | | | | | | | | | | | | Main | | |
| Sal Vasquez | Brandon Larracuente | | | | | | | | | | | | | | Main | |
| Marcus Burke | Da'Vinchi | | | | | | | | | | | | | | | Main |

Notes

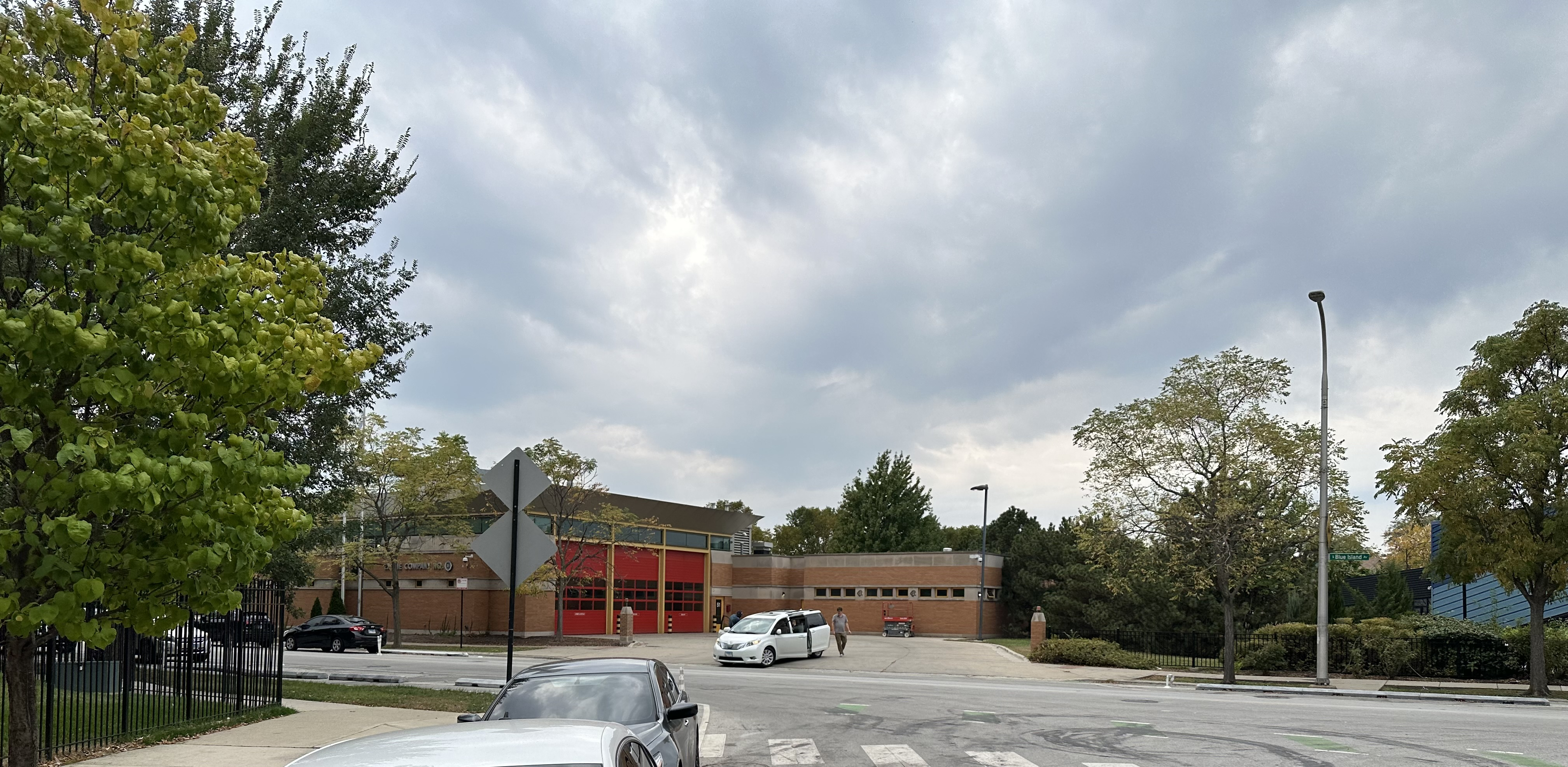
People leaving from the northeast bay side of actual Chicago Fire Department Engine 18, which doubles as Firehouse 51 in Chicago Fire

=== Kelly Severide ===
Kelly Severide
- Chicago Fire character
- First appearance: Chicago Fire: Pilot (episode 1.01)
- Created by: Matt Olmstead
- Portrayed by: Taylor Kinney

In-universe information
- Full name: Kelly Benjamin Severide
- Nicknames: Sev; Fire Cop
- Gender: Male
- Occupation: CFD Firefighter
- Family: Benjamin Severide (father; deceased); Jennifer Sheridan (mother); Katie Nolan (paternal half-sister); Jack Damon (paternal half-brother); John Sheridan (maternal grandfather); Unnamed paternal uncle
- Spouses: Brittany Baker (m. 2014; div. 2014) Stella Kidd (m. 2022)
- Significant others: Renée Whaley (former fiancée); Erin Lindsay (ex-girlfriend); Renée Royce (ex-girlfriend); Jamie Killian (ex-girlfriend); Anna Turner (ex-girlfriend; deceased); Hope Jacquinot (fling); April Sexton (fling)
- Children: Unborn child (miscarriage); Isaiah (former foster son)
- Relatives: Kenny James Herrmann (godson); Unnamed father-in-law (deceased); Unnamed mother-in-law (deceased); Laverne Williams (aunt-in-law); Ray (uncle-in-law); Cole Williams (cousin-in-law); Noah Williams (cousin-in-law)
- Nationality: American
- Date of birth: January 29, 1981

Career
- Department: Chicago Fire Department
- Years of service: 2002–present
- Rank: Lieutenant (S1 – S14); Captain (S15 — present)
- Badge No.: 1068 (season 1); 1751 (season 2 – present)

Portrayed by Taylor Kinney

Kelly Severide (season 1 – present) is the lieutenant at Firehouse 51 and the officer in charge of Squad 3.

In season 2, Severide is targeted by an arsonist twice before realizing that the arsonist is targeting firefighters. He makes the connection that the arsonist is also a firefighter, most likely Kevin Hadley, but they have no proof, until they eventually catch him in the act and he is arrested. In the episode "A Power Move", Severide spots his father Benny hugging a young woman and believes he is having an affair. Kelly meets Benny who tells him that he will succeed Boden as the new chief of fire house 51. In the episode "No Regrets", Severide confronts the young woman, Katie Nolan, who reveals Benny is her father, making her Severide's younger half-sister. Severide lashes out at Benny, who acknowledges that Severide is right about him and apologizes for not being there for him as a father. Benny decides not to take the job from Boden, and encourages Severide to get to know his half-sister. Kelly goes to find Katie and formally meets his sister for the first time.

In season 3, he struggles with the death of his best friend, Leslie Shay and is not being himself and goes out drinking every night, leaving everyone worried about him. This is until he goes to Vegas for a weekend and meets Brittany Baker, a graphic artist from Florida. Severide returns from Vegas, smiling and happy, and informs the house that he got married in Vegas. They think he is kidding at first, but soon realize he is serious.

In season 4, Severide is demoted from his Lieutenant rank due to accusations of him being a poor leader because of the number of firefighters that have either resigned or been dismissed, despite their valid reasons for leaving. Chief Boden does everything he can to get his position back and tells him to go to a meeting where his leadership skills can be improved. Severide is constantly undermined by Dallas Patterson, his replacement. In the episode "Short and Fat", Severide is promoted again to Lieutenant after Patterson's promotion to Battalion Chief. In the finale, "Superhero", he begins dating Stella Kidd.

In season 6, Stella moves in with Kelly. She tries to be cool with the idea of him dating, but she's still jealous when he sleeps with Brett's friend Hope Jacquinot.

In the season 9 premiere "Rattle Second City", the squad answer a call. Severide is nearly caught in the fire but it saved when Stella comes to his aid. In the episode "A White-Knuckle Panic", Severide and Stella become engaged and in the season 9 finale "No Survivors", they tell the firehouse that they are engaged.

In the season 10 finale "The Magnificent City of Chicago", Severide and Stella get married.

In season 11 episode "Run Like Hell", Severide has the opportunity to work on an arson investigation and gain some rigorous training. In the season 11 finale "Red Waterfall", Stella leaves Chicago to bring her husband back.

In the season 12 finale "Never Say Goodbye", Severide tells Stella that he wants them to start having children, a revelation that Stella wasn't expecting and leaves her in shock. Later he finds out that rookie firefighter, Jack Damon, is his younger paternal half-brother.

Crossover appearances

- Chicago P.D.: "Chin Check" (January 22, 2014)
- Chicago P.D.: "At Least It's Justice" (April 2, 2014)
- Chicago P.D.: "8:30 PM" (April 30, 2014)
- Chicago P.D.: "Justice" (May 11, 2016)
- Chicago P.D.: "Don't Bury This Case" (January 3, 2017)
- Chicago P.D.: "Infection, Part III" (October 16, 2019)
- Chicago P.D.: "Burden of Truth" (February 26, 2020)

=== Gabriela Dawson ===
Gabriela Dawson
- First appearance: "Pilot" (episode 1.01)
- Last appearance: "Best Friend Magic" (episode 8.09)
- Portrayed by: Monica Raymund

In-universe information
- Nickname: Gabby
- Occupation: Truck Company 81/Firefighter, CFD; Co-Owner of Molly's
- Family: Ramón Dawson (father); Camilla Dawson (mother); Antonio Dawson (brother)
- Spouse: Matthew Casey (ex-husband)
- Significant others: Peter Mills (ex-boyfriend); Jay Halstead (ex-boyfriend); Jake Cordova (ex-boyfriend)
- Children: Unborn child (miscarriage); Louie Thompson (former foster son); Bria Jamieson (former foster carer)
- Relatives: Eva Dawson (niece); Diego Dawson (nephew)
- Residence: Puerto Rico; Chicago, Illinois (formerly)

Career
- Department: Chicago Fire Department: Ambulance 61 (S1–3; 5–6); Truck 81 (S3–5); Paramedic-in-Charge.(S1–3); Firefighter Candidate (S3–4); Firefighter/Paramedic (S5–6)

Portrayed by Monica Raymund

Gabriela "Gabby" Dawson (Seasons 1–6, guest Seasons 7–8) is introduced as the Paramedic EMS in Charge of Ambulance 61, at Firehouse 51. Dawson gets in trouble for not strictly following procedure in order to save lives, which leads to her being written up several times and butting heads with Paramedic EMS Chief Hatcher. She is partnered with Leslie Shay for much of the first two seasons, and they share a close friendship, but their friendship is strained after a call goes bad. Both are well-liked by the all-male crew at 51, who are all very protective of them. She transfers to Truck 81 in season 3 after passing firefighter training.

Off-duty, she runs Molly's, a small bar jointly owned by Otis,and Herrman. The bar is also popular with her brother's colleagues from the 21st District and the staff at Chicago Medical Center, whom the paramedics regularly come into contact with. She is usually in charge of the food and beverage aspects, while Otis and Herrmann deal with the business and marketing aspects.

The younger sister of Detective Antonio Dawson, a main character in spin-offs Chicago P.D. and Chicago Justice, Gabby is well known for being able to hold her own in a largely male-dominated occupation and an all-male firehouse; she and Shay are the only women at 51 until Brett is assigned to Ambulance 61 in season 3.

Dawson shares a close friendship with longtime colleague Matthew Casey even though they are each in relationships with different people. Later, she and new candidate Peter Mills bond over their mutual love for cooking and begin a relationship in secret. When their relationship is brought to light, Casey seems to be jealous and pulls rank to keep them apart at work. She later discovers that Boden had an affair with Mills's mother, and she keeps this knowledge from him. When he finds out that she has known about it and that she still has feelings for Casey, he ends their relationship, but they remain friends. She has a brief relationship with Detective Jay Halstead at the beginning of season 2, but they mutually part ways. Following Casey's near-death accident in the season 2 episode "Not Like This", Dawson and Casey start a very serious romantic relationship, and Casey proposes to her. She later is a candidate at the Fire Academy. She fails her physical exam by several seconds, after injuring her ankle. In season 3, she has passed the Fire Academy. However, her relationship with Casey poses a problem due to fraternization rules, and she is initially assigned to Firehouse 105 in Austin under Casey's nemesis Lieutenant Welch. Welch is against her assignment to his truck company due to his misogyny. He fills the spot, and she is assigned as the candidate on Truck 81, under Herrmann's supervision. During her first few weeks on the job, Casey is extra protective of her, much to Herrmann's frustration, but she eventually settles in. In season 4, she suffers a miscarriage. Her return to duty coincides with Chief Riddle's quest to oust and make an example of Chief Boden so that he can make Fire Commissioner.

In season 5, Dawson decides to foster Louie, the child of one of the victims of a fire that Truck 81 attended, and the decision puts her at odds with Casey, who has doubts about having a child in their lives. Casey moves back in with her again and accepts Louie in their "family". After a close call involving both her and Casey, Dawson begins to consider the fact that if both of them remain at Truck 81, there is a possibility Louie could be orphaned. She decides to return to Ambulance 61 after the spot opens up when Borelli returns to the truck. She and Casey marry in the 100th episode as part of their plans to speed up Louie's adoption. However, Louie's biological father, who has up until then been listed as "unknown", shows up at both their apartment and the firehouse demanding to see his son. Louie eventually moves in with his biological father and paternal relatives.

Dawson and Casey reconnect after Dawson almost loses him in the fire that ends season 5. Dawson meets a girl named Bria in a fire. She finds out her father is addicted to meds and tries to help her, after not talking to Casey about it and instead talking to Severide. Casey finds out what they are up to and is upset. Dawson decides to let Casey help with Bria.

Dawson's old fling, Jake Cordova, comes to the firehouse since Otis is hurt, but things get crazy with Dawson. She doesn't tell Casey right away, which makes him mad when he finds out. When Otis is allowed back on the truck, everything goes back to normal. Dawson gets a call from Bria asking to help her with some "girl problems". She helps Bria get ready for prom. Casey decides they can ride in the truck, so with Stella driving, Bria and her date ride to prom in the truck. While watching the truck pull away, Dawson tells Casey she wants to start trying again. After trying for a while, Dawson wants to get to the doctor. Finding out Dawson has an aneurysm that could burst with pregnancy, Casey and Dawson stop trying. Dawson tells Casey she wants to take the risk, but Casey says no, not wanting to lose her. He brings up adoption, which sets Dawson off since she doesn't want to go through the same thing they did with Louie.

In the last episode, Dawson is offered a job in Puerto Rico, which she turns down at the beginning of the episode. During the episode, Brett and Dawson fight on one of the calls, and then Dawson and Casey fight when they get home. She departs Chicago after season 6 to help with relief work in Puerto Rico. In the Season 7 premiere, she briefly returns to Chicago and says goodbye to Casey. She returned briefly in the Season 8 episode "Best Friend Magic".

=== Sylvie Brett ===
Sylvie Brett
- Chicago Fire character
- First appearance: "Always" (3.01)
- Last appearance: "Port in the Storm" (12.06)
- Created by: Matt Olmstead
- Portrayed by: Kara Killmer

In-universe information
- Aliases: Sylvie Casey; Sylvie Brett-Casey
- Gender: Female
- Occupation: Paramedic
- Family: Julie (biological mother; deceased); Amelia (maternal half–sister); Scott (stepfather); Mr. & Mrs. Brett (adoptive parents); Unnamed adoptive brother Annie (adoptive aunt)
- Spouse: Matthew Casey (m. 2024)
- Significant others: Kyle Sheffield (former fiancé); Harrison (former fiancé); Antonio Dawson (ex-boyfriend); Joe Cruz (ex-boyfriend); Dylan (ex-boyfriend)
- Children: Julia Brett-Casey (adoptive daughter)
- Relatives: Gregory Casey (father-in-law; deceased); Nancy Casey (mother-in-law); Christie Casey (sister- in-law); Violet Jordan (niece)
- Nationality: American
- Date of birth: 1990
- Hometown: Fowlerton, Indiana
- Residence: Portland, Oregon; Chicago, Illinois (formerly)

Career
- Department: Portland Fire Department; Chicago Fire Department (formerly)
- Rank: Paramedic (seasons 3–4); Paramedic in Charge (seasons 5–12)

Portrayed by Kara Killmer

Paramedic Sylvie Brett (season 3 – season 12) joins Ambulance 61 following Leslie Shay's death. Initially, 51 is not enthusiastic about her arrival; most of the crew had known and worked with Shay for a long time and are still getting over her death. Despite a frosty beginning working together, Dawson becomes Brett's first friend in Chicago, and the others warm up to her soon after. She works alongside Peter Mills when he replaces Dawson after she transfers to Truck 81 as a candidate. Mills is not cleared for duty after an inner ear injury, which damaged his balance following the explosion where Shay died, so he is assigned to work on Ambulance 61. The two become good friends and partners while working together; as a Christmas gift, he gives her a wiggling hula-girl that sits on the rig's dashboard to this day. Like the rest of 51, Sylvie is upset when Mills chooses to leave for North Carolina with his family near the end of Season 3 and during his goodbye party, she breaks down in tears and hugs him goodbye. In late season 3, Mills gets replaced by Jessica "Chili" Chilton as the Paramedic In Charge (PIC); in mid season 4, Brett becomes PIC after Chili is fired and goes to rehab. Brett has appeared on the spin-off Chicago P.D. as the first responder on scene, crossing paths with members of the Intelligence Unit, and on Chicago Med and Chicago Justice.

Brett is a small-Midwestern-town girl from Indiana, where she grew up in a farm with her parents and a little brother. She frequented the church and even sang in the choir. She reveals to Dawson that she was adopted and never knew her birth parents. In her first episode, she self-proclaims she is a "runaway bride" who goes "up I-65 to Chicago" to escape her ex-fiancée Harrison after their engagement fell apart. However, a few episodes later her husband to-be finds her working at 51 and comes to visit her. He apologizes in front of everyone for leaving her before their marriage, revealing that he's the one who had cold feet. Nonetheless, she gets back together with him briefly until she realizes he has a very overbearing nature. He psychologically tries to dominate her by telling her how she should feel and where she should work. She tells him she's happy in Chicago but he tells her she isn't. She breaks up with him again and he leaves. Initially she has difficulty adjusting to city life due to her naivete, as shown by the fact that she leaves cash out on the table with the windows open and rents an apartment in a neighborhood known for crime because the rent is cheap. She also has a hard time handling some of the tough calls early on, but learns to deal with it and adapts quickly. She shares a new apartment with Gabby Dawson when the latter's relationship with Matthew Casey cools. Afterwards, she moves in with Cruz and Otis.

When Severide returns from a long furlough after Shay's death and first sees Brett going out to Ambulance 61, he does a double take, noticing the resemblance between her and Shay. While he is going through his grief process over losing Shay, he tries to hang out with her while deeply intoxicated, yet when sober and on the job, he treats her more coolly, a behavior that visibly throws her. After the two get closer while working together to help a single mom and her kid, Severide invites her to go to Vegas with him. She says she would love to, but doesn't know if that's a great idea so he leaves without her. This apparent mutual pull they feel for each other then ceases after he marries Brittany. Sylvie joins the best-rated Zumba class she finds on Yelp in her neighborhood and finds that the instructor is none other than Cruz. They agree to keep it a secret as long as she can teach him how to cook since he's opening Molly's 2 and she has skills that she no longer gets to use, but she ends up telling Casey due to his misunderstanding of her relationship with Cruz. She asks him to keep it a secret, but he ends up telling Dawson, who then tells Hermann, who then tells Mouch, who then tells everyone else. Joe then asks Sylvie out and she rejects him. However, she accepts some time later and they start dating. After a few months, the two break up once they realize they're not in love and remain good friends. At this point, Otis seems to realize he has feelings for her and considers asking her out. Later in Season 4 he asks her to the CFD gala and after initially rejecting him she agrees and they go together. He keeps meaning to ask her out again, but other people or things get in the way and in the end they remain just friends.

Brett appears to have a romantic interest in Officer Sean Roman from Chicago P.D. as they share an encounter in the season 3 finale of Chicago Fire. She reveals her feelings for Jimmy Borelli, when she finds out that Jimmy is leaving, she confesses her feelings for him, which she later tries to cover up when she finds out he is staying in the CFD and working alongside her as her new partner.

During a call in Season 4, Brett gets attached to a baby she delivers to a gunshot victim mother who dies in the ambulance. She visits the baby in the hospital several times until Chief Boden finds out and tells her to let it go and so does Chili. However, she still goes back, where she meets Dr. Charles (Chicago Med). He tells her secretly to check the father's details while the duty nurse is out. She goes to see him and tells him about the son but he ignores her. However, when she comes back to see the baby yet again, the dad is there and thanks her. She and Dawson also help host a wedding at Firehouse 51, where she sings.

In season 5, both Chili and Jimmy leave as paramedics, leaving Dawson to take their spot and work alongside Brett once more. During a case, Gabby's older brother Antonio Dawson shows up, and Sylvie instantly develops a liking for him. After some consideration, she asks him out but he refuses, saying his breakup with his ex-wife is still on his mind and he doesn't want her mixed up with this. She says she doesn't mind and they start going out. In the end of "An Agent of the Machine", Sylvie tries harder to impress Antonio's son Diego, who likes to play chess and whom she doesn't connect with. Joe teaches her the basics and Antonio asks her later to take care of Diego when he's called in to work. Antonio's ex-wife, Laura, shows up at the firehouse and takes Diego away, telling Sylvie to mind her own business and stay away from her family. This upsets Sylvie and she tells Antonio she doesn't want to be in the middle of his fight with his ex-wife. He says he warned her about this before but she replies that she didn't expect to be directly confronted by Laura. He lashes out and she breaks up with him. Antonio later shows up at Sylvie's door and apologizes, and even though she understands she tells him he's not ready and it's best if they stay apart. She later tries to get her mind off Antonio by doing extra exercise at the firehouse, trying to find online makeup classes, changing her look and even learning German. Dawson feels bad and tries setting her up with people Casey knows, but Casey doesn't want to get involved in her love life. In "A Man's Legacy", while in the hospital, she sees Antonio with his sister after visiting his father and talks with him. In "Foul is Fair", it was revealed that Brett breaks up with Antonio again, as they insist they should keep things casual but she fears if they keep seeing each other one of them will get hurt eventually. At the end of "Hiding Not Seeking", she has a one-night stand with Antonio in his car, then the two start seeing each other again. In "Looking for a Lifeline", Brett confides in Dawson, who suggests that Brett might be pregnant. She takes a pregnancy test, but is disappointed when it is negative, making her realize in "The Chance to Forgive" that she wants to spend her life with Antonio. She wants to talk to him about them making a real shot at a relationship, but before she can do so, finds out that he has been set up on a blind date. After the discovery, she clears her locker of anything to do with Antonio, declaring to Dawson that she is a new person.

In "It Wasn't Enough", her High School friend Hope Jacquinot comes for a visit and stirs up trouble, first by seeking out Severide's attention, despite Brett's warning that it is a bad idea to get involved with him as he is recovering from the death of his girlfriend. Then Hopes gets an office position working at the bullpen and Connie warns Brett that there are rumors that Hope had stolen money from her last employer. Hope says it was a misunderstanding following a bad break-up. Then she purposefully misplaces Stella Kidd's payment only so she can appear to come out as the hero in the situation, gaining Stella's favor. Hope forges a signature to get Kidd transferred to CFD's Public Relations Department to get her out of Firehouse 51 and away from Severide. Casey and Chief Boden find out, and she gets fired. Afterwards, Sylvie tells her to go back to Fowlerton and that she doesn't want anything to do with her anymore. Brett is very apologetic with her colleagues at 51 for bringing Hope into their lives and all the mess that followed, but people don't hold her responsible nor any grudges over what happened.

During the season 6 episode "Slamigan", Brett assists Cruz in creating a new firefighting tool since she grew up on a farm and has experience welding. This brings them closer, and it appears Cruz develops feelings for her once more. He spends the rest of season 6 battling his feelings for Brett, which gets her aggravated at his overprotectiveness in a few instances. In the season 6 finale, he considers confessing his feelings for her, but once she declares how much she cherishes his friendship he decides to keep this to himself and move on.

In "The Grand Gesture", Brett is distraught over a stabbing victim who dies in front of her after being stabbed by a mentally unstable man. She is seen crying in her car after the call. She eventually explodes when Dawson also becomes angry and yells at her when she grabs scissors instead of gauze during a call. She is upset at Dawson for being treated this way, and they have a fight right before Dawson leaves to work at relief efforts in Puerto Rico.

In "A Closer Eye", Brett turns away every paramedic she is partnered with, believing Dawson will come back. She is then partnered with Emily Foster by Chief Boden, who tells her to make it work. At first, the chemistry between the two is a little rocky. In "Going to War", she confronts Casey about letting Dawson leave. He replies that there was nothing anyone else could have done. He also gives her a goodbye gift from her recent ex-partner: a photo of the pair, on the back of which is written: “Love you, partner, and always will." In that same episode, she shows Foster an intubating technique on a severely burned victim, which impresses the new paramedic. Brett says her old partner was a master at it and taught her well; it's the very same technique that Dawson taught her during the first episode of Season 3. She also learns that Foster was a surgical resident at Lakeshore Hospital and got kicked out of the program for cheating on her medical boards evaluation, as she was going through a rough patch in her personal life during her mother's sudden illness and death. After a rocky start, they form a good partnership at work and become good friends too, with Brett even defending Foster and berating a doctor at Lakeshore who "ghosts" her on a date.

In season 7, she dates Kyle Sheffield, a chaplain with the CFD and friend of Foster. They break up in "Fault in Him", with Kyle saying their relationship has led to firefighters not being willing to confide in him after Brett asks him to talk to Casey about a bad call he experienced. She has a hard time moving on and sympathizes with Casey on the subject of tough breakups. She then attempts to help him out by setting him up with her spin class instructor, Olivia, in "Try Like Hell". After a game night with their friends, Olivia says Matt is great, but that Brett should be the one dating him as she and Matt are "meant for each other". Later, Brett confides this to Foster and Kidd, who seem to agree with Olivia's assessment, leaving Sylvie confused about her feelings for Casey. In "I'm Not Leaving You", Kyle comes to 51 and proposes to Sylvie in front of everyone after he tells her he's moving to Indiana. Brett accepts his proposal and tries to make it work with him, but misses her life in Chicago and isn't happy in her new quiet life with Kyle, so they break up.

Brett returns to 51 in the third episode of season 8 after leaving Fowlerton and resumes working on Ambulance 61 with Foster. Her feelings for Casey still seem confusing, and she gets overly defensive when he assumes she is dating a guy who meets her for drinks at Molly's. She also meets her birth mother who wants to make a connection with her before giving birth to her second child. Sylvie spends time with her mother Julie until the latter dies giving birth. The baby survives and Sylvie becomes a half-sister to a baby girl name Amelia. Although her stepfather initially does not want to take care of her, Sylvie is able to persuade him to keep his daughter to honor his wife.

In Season 9, Sylvie is assigned a new partner Gianna Mackey and they become fast friends. Sylvie's status with Casey also evolves, with the two sharing a kiss. However, Sylvie fears his former relationship with Dawson will be a problem and calls it off before things go further. Her relationship with Casey becomes awkward for a period of time, but they continue to support each other. When Casey goes through a health scare, Sylvie is there to support him, which results in her breaking up with her boyfriend at the time, Greg Grainger. After Casey confesses his love to Sylvie, she too admits to him that she loves him, and they finally consummate their relationship in the season 9 finale.

In season 10, Casey moves to Oregon to look after Andrew Darden's kids. He maintains a long-distance relationship with Sylvie until the start of season 11, they break up due to the distance and Sylvie feels they are growing apart. In season 11, Sylvie adopts a baby girl named Julia. In the season 11 finale "Red Waterfall" Casey returns to Chicago and proposes to Sylvie. They officially marry in season 12 episode 6 "Port in the Storm", then Sylvie moves to Oregon permanently to live with Casey, their adopted daughter Julia and the Darden boys.

=== Wallace Boden ===
Wallace Boden
- Chicago Fire character
- First appearance: CF: Pilot (episode 1.01)
- Last appearance: CF: Never Say Goodbye (episode 12.13)
- Created by: Matt Olmstead
- Portrayed by: Eamonn Walker

In-universe information
- Full name: Wallace Boden Jr.
- Nickname: Wally
- Gender: Male
- Family: Wallace Boden, Sr. (father; deceased)
- Spouses: Unnamed ex-wife Shonda Sherman (ex-wife); Donna Robbins (wife)
- Children: Terrance Boden (son); James (former stepson)
- Relatives: Julian Robbins (brother-in-law)
- Nationality: American

Career
- Department: Chicago Fire Department
- Years of service: 1980s–present
- Rank: Battalion Chief 25 (S1–10); Deputy District Chief (S10–12); First Deputy Fire Commissioner (S12–present)

Portrayed by Eamonn Walker

Chief Wallace Boden (seasons 1–12) is the chief in charge of Battalion 25 stationed at Firehouse 51. He is a scarred veteran of the fire department and served with Benny Severide and Henry Mills, the fathers of his subordinates, Kelly Severide and Peter Mills, respectively. Chief Boden has unwavering dedication to the firefighters under him and has earned their loyalty and respect. He will go to great lengths to protect the integrity of the firehouse and his men, even if it means having to antagonize them by disciplining them. His career is threatened after a feud with Gail McLeod when she tries to overthrow him and install his former colleague Benny Severide as the chief of Battalion 25. Boden refuses to give up his house and fights for it. Later she tries to "justify" the closing due to an incident at a call where the victim had to be cut out of a $40,000 trash compactor. McLeod is eventually removed and Firehouse 51 remains open. Despite his serious exterior, he is open to advice from his men, particularly regarding his personal life; for example, he asks Herrmann, who has five children, for tips on how to deal with his pregnant wife Donna and infant son and Mills for some insight while he was dating Donna. He also views his firefighters as his extended family, especially his two lieutenants, Matt Casey and Kelly Severide, who view him as a mentor and fatherly figure at 51. Stella Kidd looks up to chief Boden as a father figure since she lost her parents at such a young age.

Boden has an ex-wife, Shonda, and a stepson, James, who appear in season 1 and later in season 5. Shaunda owns a pancake and waffle restaurant on the south side of Chicago that Boden and his crew often visit. In season 2, while intervening on a fire in a building he meets one of the residents, Donna Robbins, an elementary school teacher. Being attracted to each other, they start dating until Boden breaks it off, being afraid of screwing up the relationship like he always does. After a while, he meets Donna again and learns that she's pregnant with his child. Soon after, he proposes to Donna, arguing that it would be better for the child since he will be able to support them financially. She turns him down, not convinced by his non-romantic point of view. Confused, Boden goes to Mills for some explanation. He understands then that he didn't speak about his feelings and, in full uniform, proposes to Donna again, successfully this time. He marries Donna in a small ceremony, the same day as her parents years ago. Herrmann is his best man and organizes the wedding ceremony in front of firehouse 51 with Mills as clergyman. Donna has some difficulties with her pregnancy, having a risk of fatal blood loss. At first she refuses to know the baby's gender unlike Boden who would like to know. She reveals to him later that they are expecting a boy. They have a son Terence who is born in Squad 3's truck en route to the hospital (Chicago Med).

Boden had an affair with Ingrid Mills, Peter Mills' mother, when she and her husband were separated. As soon as he realized they had still feelings for each other, he stepped back. Mills is very upset when he learns about the affair and remains angry at Boden for a long time. Boden has a bad relationship with Benny Severide due to their opposite views on the heroic death of Henry Mills. Benny Severide argues that Mills' death was due to his attempt to impress Boden who was having an affair with his wife. In season 5, Jimmy, now a high school student, comes to live with him and joins the crew at 51 to "observe" what life is like as a firefighter. However, Severide and Cruz both suspect that Jimmy is not telling the whole story. Jimmy finally confesses that his mother's new boyfriend had been abusing him physically whenever she is not around. In "Ignite on Contact", his wife Donna was almost killed when the high school she teaches is on fire and another teacher is seriously injured. It is later revealed to be arson and one of the students a suspect.

In "The One that Matters the Most", Boden contemplates moving up in rank after the CFD is considering promoting him. In "One for the Ages", after being encouraged by Casey and Severide to seek a promotion in "The Unrivaled Standard", he decides to run for Fire Commissioner of Chicago with the Mayor of Chicago endorsing him. In "The Grand Gesture", his run for the fire commissioner is stopped when allegations of bribery come to light. He then loses the campaign to Chief Carl Grissom.

Boden's father Wallace Sr. (Richard Roundtree) lives in Orlando, Florida. In the episode "Ambush Predator", Boden finds out that his father has stage four cancer and has been given four months to live. Wallace Sr. peacefully passes away at his son and daughter-in-law's home at the end of the episode "Call It Paradise".

In Season 1, Boden gets close to Ernie, a teenager he sees several times on garbage fire interventions. Thinking the boy may be responsible for those fires, he invites him to the firehouse to investigate with Herrmann's help. It turns out that Ernie was under his uncle Ray's influence and he eventually dies in a fire set by Ray. His death devastates Boden. In Season 4, Boden invites Capt. Dallas Patterson to command Squad 3 after Kelly Severide is demoted from lieutenant to firefighter. Boden and Patterson are later seen playing poker with Sgt. Whitaker of Chicago PD. Boden faces legal troubles after a neighbor, Serena Holmes, accuses him of home invasion and assault. Holmes had moved into the apartment next to Boden and Donna as a temporary Airbnb tenant and requests Boden's help after locking herself out of the apartment, claiming that she had left the stove on. Boden forces entry into the apartment at her request, only to find the stove off and Holmes acting seductively. She offered him a glass of wine, which he declines before leaving. Later, a detective with Chicago P.D. confronts Boden at home and says that Holmes claims that Boden broke into her apartment and assaulted her with a wine bottle. The detective produces photographs that show an obviously battered Holmes. Knowing that he did not commit the crime, Boden enlists the help of Firehouse 51 to uncover the truth. Boden first suspects that Deputy District Chief Ray Riddle, who had been attempting to remove Boden from his post, may have put Holmes up to the job of sullying Boden's reputation. But with the help of Kelly Severide's ex-girlfriend, attorney Jamie Killian, it is revealed that arsonist Roger Maddox - who was set to go to trial for his crimes and who was being represented by Killian - hired Holmes to accuse Boden. It is also revealed that Maddox set out to discredit members of the department's Office of Fire Investigation (OFI), including captains Greg Duffy and Suzie Wilder, who were to testify against Maddox at the trial.

In Season 8, after the death of Otis, Boden is reluctant to bring Blake Gallo into his firehouse due to his daredevil antics but is convinced by Casey and Severide to give him a chance. He soon learns of Gallo's tragic history of losing his family in a fire and it is implied that Boden was the one who saved him as a child. Throughout Season 8, as a way to cope after Otis and seeing her potential as a leader, Boden takes Stella under his wing, giving her opportunities to prove herself. However, in doing so, Stella exhausts herself trying and causes an accident. Afterwards, Boden apologizes for turning her into his project, but she thanks him for the opportunity to so, strengthening their relationship.

In Season 9, after seeing Stella use her ingenuity to save Severide and a civilian, he offers her the chance to take the Lieutenant's exam. During this time, Deputy Fire Commissioner offers him a potential promotion to Deputy District Chief, which he gets in Season 10. Despite the challenges of his new role he remains confident that the family at firehouse 51 will stay together, no matter what.

At the end of Season 12, after realizing the department could fall into the wrong hands with a new Deputy Fire Commissioner soon to be appointed, he applies for the position and is promoted to the Deputy Fire Commissioner of the Chicago Fire Department. As of Season 13, Boden is no longer listed as one of the main characters and is listed as a recurring guest character.

=== Christopher Herrmann ===
Christopher Herrmann
- Chicago Fire character
- First appearance: CF: Pilot (episode 1.01); CPD: Stepping Stone (episode 1.01)
- Created by: Matt Olmstead
- Portrayed by: David Eigenberg

In-universe information
- Gender: Male
- Occupation: CFD, Firefighter; Co-Owner of Molly's
- Family: Bill Herrmann (father); Larry Herrmann (brother); Tracy Herrmann (niece); Leslie (uncle)
- Spouse: Cindy Herrmann (wife)
- Children: Lee Henry Herrmann (son); Luke Herrmann (son); Annabelle Herrmann (daughter); Max Herrmann (son); Kenny James Herrmann (son)
- Nationality: American

Career
- Department: Chicago Fire Department: Truck 81 (seasons 1–7; season 14 – present); Engine 51 (seasons 7–13)
- Years of service: 1994–present
- Rank: Firefighter (seasons 1–7; season 13 – present); Lieutenant (seasons 7–13); Captain (season 13)

Portrayed by David Eigenberg

Christopher Herrmann (season 1 – present) is one of the senior firefighters of Truck 81. He is the third most-experienced firefighter at 51 (after Mouch and Boden), having served for nearly two decades. He passed the lieutenant's promotion examination during season 2 episode "Virgin Skin" and was wait-listed until the Season 7 episode "This Isn't Charity" when he was finally promoted. He is generally considered Casey's de facto right-hand man on the job by the rest of the truck company, as shown by the fact that he was made acting lieutenant whenever Casey is off-duty or unavailable and also oversees candidates assigned to Truck 81. Casey once described him as "the heart and soul" and "the beating heart" of Firehouse 51.

Outside his job, Herrmann was a self-described "day trader". There is a running gag in the show about how Herrmann would come up with ideas to solve his various problems and they would often backfire or go completely wrong. His sharp instincts on the job are in stark contrast to those when he is not at the firehouse, which include taking on several "get rich quick" schemes that have left him financially precarious. However, he seemed to have finally made a good investment by opening Molly's Bar, along with Dawson and Otis, after putting out a fire at the location and buying it out. Molly's was nearly another of his failed investments as paperwork mishaps, building code issues and competition from a large sports bar located across the street threatens closure. In season 1, one of his investments goes bad and he loses his home to foreclosure, forcing him and his family to move in with the in-laws for several months. In season 4, he attempts to run a rude and condescending couple out of town, after they sued Molly's for "breaching" the city's noise limits, by hosting karaoke night at Molly's and belting out the chorus of "Don't You (Forget About Me)" over the microphone. He also developed a near father-daughter relationship with Chili in season 3 as he immensely assists her design her dad's business idea, helping to fund and create it. The relationship greatly fades away by Season 4 as she breaks away from him and the rest of 51 after her sister's death and spirals into alcoholism. In season 5 he and Otis bring a discarded table tennis table back to the firehouse and end up smashing out a glass panel after the former challenges the rest of Truck 81 to a "show down".

Until the birth of Boden's son with his wife Donna, Herrmann is the only character on the show who is married with children. As such, he has a soft spot for young victims. In season 3, after learning that a young boy he had previously rescued died from a fire caused by his negligent alcoholic father, he has to be physically restrained by Casey from hitting the father in a fit of rage. Boden seeks his advice many times about dealing with his pregnant wife and infant son. Herrmann is also the first to notice Dawson's strange behavior prior to her and Casey revealing her pregnancy to the crew.

Herrmann is portrayed as a hands-on father and devoted family man who considers his fellow firefighters and paramedics at 51 as part of his extended family; most of his colleagues have babysat his five children at some point and Herrmann has no qualms about discussing the children with his wife in front of them. In the episode "Path of Destruction" it is stated that he and his family live in the West Lawn area of Chicago. At the start of season 1, Herrmann and his wife Cindy have three sons and a daughter. In season 4 he stated that they have been married for twenty-two years. Cindy had suffered a miscarriage before their first child Lee Henry. Their fifth child and youngest son was born in the season finale after a difficult birth. Severide and Shay are named as godparents. Herrmann is shown to be a doting father and husband who often speaks of his family. All five children were christened into the Catholic Church. Because Cindy is Catholic, she does not use birth control, which leads to Herrmann's much derided decision to have a vasectomy as his 20th anniversary present to her so that she does not have to go through another pregnancy without compromising her religious beliefs. His co-workers all try to dissuade him from going through with it but their "concern" backfires against them as Cindy reacts by laughing and hugging her husband.

When Rebecca Jones joins firehouse 51 as the new candidate, her cocky behavior does not sit well with any of the members. However, it is revealed that her father is constantly trying to stop her being a firefighter and shutting down all of her ambitions, which eventually drives her to suicide. Herrmann and Mills get into a heated argument following the cause of her suicide. Mills accuses Herrmann and the others of being uncaring and inconsiderate, which Herrmann fights against until revealing his guilt in that he saw her the night before and wondered whether him saying something to her would have changed the outcome. They get past this together. Herrmann looks into expanding Molly's into a franchise and pitches his idea to the group. Cruz and Mouch want in and after a good presentation, Herrmann happily accepts their proposal into expanding Molly's into a truck this time.

Herrmann and Dawson also have tension between them when she reveals she is going to be a firefighter at the end of season 1, due to a bad experience with a female firefighter. When she finally passes her physical exam and becomes a candidate, Welch of 81 rejects her and quickly recruits a male candidate. This upsets her, so Boden overlooks her and Casey's relationship and lets her be the new candidate at 51. This does not sit well with Herrmann since Casey makes a habit of overlooking all of her mistakes, forcing him to do the same and not question her. She reveals afterwards that she has been deliberately making mistakes in hopes that someone will overlook their friendship and correct her.

When Chili joins 51, despite the at-the-time cold welcome, she tries to make friends but does no't have a lot in common with the others. This is until she reveals she's in the midst of creating and designing a button on the side of beverages to cool them in five seconds. Being a business investor, Herrmann immediately jumps in and tells her she can sell it at Molly's as soon as she's finished. He helps her a lot until Sylvie and Dawson tell him to calm and slow down since Chili is spending all of her money on it without leaving any to pay her bills. He says this to Chili who thanks him for his help, saying Herrmann reminds her of her own father who died but created the idea in the first place. They get emotional and he says he will be right with her. Herrmann and Cindy give Chili Molly's funds to help her idea, for which she is very thankful. They then celebrate their success when she finishes her design and test to see that it works, which it does. However, she's left deeply hurt and upset when they find that someone else has already created and launched it on TV. She cries but Herrmann tells her she will definitely come up with something else and hugs her.

In season 1, Otis, Herrmann, and Dawson buy a bar, which they call Molly's. They had been called to a fire there and the owner wanted to sell it and move to Miami. After agreeing to buy it, they discover that a local mobster named Arthur had conned his way into being offered a "minority" stake. Arthur repeatedly harasses the threesome, even nearly setting Dawson on fire before Detective Jay Halstead takes him down and arrests him. After much difficulty, Molly's has become an established bar and is popular with firefighters and cops (it is featured multiple times in spin-offs Chicago P.D. and Chicago Med). After Captain Patterson, then chief, tells Cruz to tell Freddy he can no longer come to 51, Herrmann happily offers him a job at Molly's to get him out of the gang life he wants to escape. He's friendly towards him. At the end of "Short and Fat", Herrmann is stabbed by Freddy, Cruz's friend, at Molly's bar after he tells a joke that Freddy takes as an offense. The doctors reveal that he's lost a lot of blood and it would be difficult for him to pull through. Things heat up between Rhodes (Chicago Med) and Severide after he accuses him of not treating Herrmann properly after Halstead (Med) says something about this to one of the others. However, he pulls through and is back to 51 soon. Although, the encounter leaves him with a shaky feeling and he is constantly on edge his first shift back - constantly worrying about Cindy and his kids even though he tries to hide this. He also tells Cruz not to mention Freddy to him again. He was later discovered by his co-workers in the crossover episode "The Beating Heart" and was rushed to Chicago Med. Freddy was later arrested by Chicago PD detectives, after he was rescued by firefighters from hanging on the fire escape. He makes a statement against Freddy in court. In "Not Everyone Makes It", he had to testify against Freddy about the events that led up to the stabbing. Freddy's father, also in prison, requests Herrmann to see him. Cruz tells him not to, and he says he won't but ends up going. He reveals that he used to beat Freddy and is the reason why he is the way he is. When Cruz convinces him that Freddy came from a hard life, he convinces the judge to be lenient with him. He eventually retracts his statement and they let him out with watch. Cruz helps him through it. Herrmann as well as other members of Truck 81 report their concerns about Jimmy Borelli to Boden. He is in attendance at Matthew Casey and Gabriela Dawson's wedding. Many other story lines include him dealing with Lee Henry, continuing to operate Molly's Bar, etc. In the season 5 finale, he is seen performing CPR on Mouch, who appears to be having a heart attack. In the season 6 premiere, Hermann, as well as the rest of the firehouse fully return to normal lives. Luckily and surprisingly, he survives the fire that ended Season 5. In the season 7 Episode "Thirty Percent Sleight of Hand", he is promoted to Lieutenant of 51.

In season 8, he faces charges of conduct unbecoming when he moves a CPD squad car in order to help position Engine 51 for a hostage situation with a potential fire, and things get worse when he tries to make things square with the officer who filed the complaint. These charges are later dropped when Severide makes a deal to join the Office of Fire Investigation in exchange for Herrmann's charges being dropped.

In season 12, Chief Boden states that after a little assistance by Squad Lt. Severide that he would like Engine Lt. Christopher Herrmann to take the captain's and battalion chief's test and become the new chief of Firehouse 51.

Crossover appearances

- Chicago P.D.: "Stepping Stone" (January 8, 2014)
- Chicago P.D.: "Conventions" (February 26, 2014)
- Chicago P.D.: "Disco Bob" (January 21, 2015)
- Chicago P.D.: "Debts of the Past" (October 21, 2015)

=== Jessica "Chili" Chilton ===
Jessica Chilton
- First appearance: CF: "We Called Her Jellybean" (episode 3.21); Med: "Mistaken" (episode 1.04)
- Last appearance: CF: "All Hard Parts" (episode 4.14); Med: "Malignant" (episode 1.05)
- Portrayed by: Dora Madison

In-universe information
- Occupation: Paramedic, CFD
- Family: Unnamed Parents; Alissa Martin (twin sister; deceased); Margaret (older sister)

Career
- Department: Chicago Fire Department: Ambulance 61
- Years of service: ?–2016
- Rank: Paramedic in Charge

Portrayed by Dora Madison

Jessica "Chili" Chilton (seasons 3–4) replaces Peter Mills as the new Paramedic in Charge (PIC) in season 3 after the latter leaves the CFD. The crew at 51 are initially lukewarm to her as they are still getting over Mills' departure, having warmed up and grown to like their former Candidate.

She comes from a dysfunctional family; her parents divorced not long after marrying and her mother became a heroin addict and eventually abandoned the family. Her sister Alissa lives in Kansas City and they lost contact. Prior to being cast on Chicago Fire, Madison appeared as Alissa on Chicago P.D. in the episode "Call It Macaroni". Alissa was one of Antonio Dawson's CIs and using the cash paid by the district for her tip, leaves Chicago to start a new life. When Chili joins Firehouse 51, despite the at-the-time cold welcome, she tries to make friends but doesn't have a lot in common with the others. This is until she reveals she's in the midst of creating and designing a button on the side of beverages to cool them in five seconds. Being a business investor, Herrmann immediately jumps in and tells her she can sell it at Molly's as soon as she's finished. He helps her a lot until Sylvie and Dawson tell him to calm and slow down since Chili is spending all of her money on it without leaving any to pay her bills. He says this to Chili who thanks him for his help, saying Herrmann reminds her of her own father who died but created the idea in the first place. They get emotional and he says he will be right with her. Herrmann and Cindy gave Chili Molly's funds to help her idea, for which she is very thankful. They then celebrate their success when she finishes her design and test to see that it works, which it does. However, she's left deeply hurt and upset when they find that someone else has already created and launched it on TV. She cries but Herrmann tells her she will definitely come up with something else and hugs her. At the start of Season 4, Chief Boden is under watch and investigation up to the point he is arrested and demoted from Chief and replaced by Dallas Patterson. When Casey then sees Chili and Jimmy hanging out too closely with each other around the firehouse, he tells Jimmy to slow things since it isn't appropriate while they are under watch, especially with Patterson. Jimmy tells Chili this and she is okay. However, she shows inappropriate behavior again and when they're caught by Patterson, he gets worried but she laughs it off, which angers him and they break up.

Throughout the next few weeks, Chili behaves erratically and is constantly angry and raging at anyone who asks her anything or questions her. Sylvie assumes it's the breakup or the fact that Herrmann is in hospital but Jimmy tells her he doesn't think it's either of those. A brief moment of her crying in the hospital waiting room is shown but the reason still isn't revealed.

The next shift, the house is on lockdown from a tornado warning. Jimmy asks Chili if they can be friends, to which she agrees, but the next second, she lashes out and tells him he isn't worth it and that it's unbelievable he would break up with her just because Casey told him to. During a call later that day, Chili mistakenly injects a seizing victim with morphine instead of valium, which causes the girl to stop breathing altogether instead of stopping seizing. She zones out after this and Sylvie takes over, properly injecting the patient and therefore saving her life. Chili says it's no big deal. At the hospital, she lies to the attending when she says the reason the woman has morphine in her system is because she accidentally knocked over a bottle, causing it to break. Sylvie tries to talk to her about this later but she brushes her aside and is making plans to go out. Wary and finally tired of her behavior, Sylvie reports her actions and the syringe accident to Chief Boden. After Alissa's death, Chili starts drinking to cope and Borelli and Brett both witness her mood swings. While at Molly's, Dawson is talking to Antonio, who tells her that Chili's sister Alissa was found dead in her apartment a week ago. Boden asks her about this and she says she is fine, he gives her the second strike for the syringe incident though. She then apologizes to Dawson and Sylvie for acting rudely toward them, which they accept. However, they see her drinking the next night and are disappointed. She starts up again and during a call, Sylvie ignores a direct call from Chili, who then tells Boden she wants Sylvie gone. Sylvie also finds out that Chili was asked to leave from the last house because of her problem. Boden gets angry hearing this and asks her to work things out or she'll be gone from 51 too. They both work things out at a later case where she apologizes to Sylvie for nearly replacing her. She pushes them away by repeatedly brushing them off. Things go downhill again when Chili receives a package at her day off containing all of Alissa's belongings and she breaks down again. She then starts to make a habit of taking small breaks to drink and then come back and spray some breath spray and chew gum so the people don't notice. However, Severide notices her constant breaks and tries to talk to her but she ignores him and Sylvie tries to look past her issues. However, Severide eventually catches her out and tells her to talk to Boden or he will. She goes to see him and tells him she needs help and is willing to take time off to go to counselling but he fires her instead. He then tells her to ask for help and she says she just did and they did nothing. She goes to her locker and the whole of 51 follow, trying to talk to her. She says they aren't her family and leaves, including leaving her photos with them behind. Herrmann gets one of the photos and frames it and takes it to her apartment. He tells her through the door that she can always come to him and leaves the picture behind.

Chili calls someone and tells them she needs help. It's revealed it was Severide, who takes her to counselling and is glad she called. She tells him she'll call them and apologize. She thanks him and she goes to rehab. At Severide's urging she enters an alcohol rehabilitation program to get help.

In "Bad for the Soul", she is mentioned when Sylvie asks Jimmy if she's responded to their calls, which she hasn't.

=== Brian "Otis" Zvonecek ===
Brian Zvonecek
- Chicago Fire character
- First appearance: Chicago Fire: Pilot (episode 1.01); CPD: Stepping Stone (episode 1.01)
- Last appearance: CF: Best Friend Magic (episode 8.09)
- Created by: Matt Olmstead
- Portrayed by: Yuri Sardarov

In-universe information
- Full name: Brian Zvonecek
- Nickname: Otis
- Gender: Male
- Occupation: Firefighter, CFD; Co-Owner of Molly's; Podcaster
- Family: Unnamed father (deceased); Ms. Panchoulidze (mother); Nick Zvonecek (brother); Vlad Zvonecek (brother); Dimitri Zvonecek (brother); Baba (grandmother); Unnamed sister
- Significant others: Katie Nolan (ex-girlfriend); Lily (girlfriend)
- Relatives: Zoya (cousin)
- Nationality: American
- Date of death: May 22, 2019
- Status: Deceased

Career
- Department: Chicago Fire Department: Firehouse 51, Truck 81; Firehouse 67 (S1; temporary)
- Years of service: 2008–2019
- Rank: Firefighter/Engineer

Portrayed by Yuri Sardarov

Firefighter Brian "Otis" Zvonecek (seasons 2–8; recurring season 1) is a firefighter on Truck 81 and the most junior member at 51 until Peter Mills' arrival. Nicknamed after the eponymous elevator company as he is frequently assigned to elevator or ladder duty, Otis has just recently finished his candidacy before Mills joins the truck company. He is eager to move up the ranks within the firehouse but often feels overlooked and unappreciated by the rest of his truck company. The other more senior firefighters pull rank, including Lieutenant Casey, and assign him to do undesirable menial jobs around the firehouse or pull pranks on him. This leads him to consider transferring to another firehouse, but he ultimately decides to stay with Truck 81 after Severide pranks him into believing that the rest of the crew have placed a bet on how long he'll last at 51. In season 2 Otis begins a relationship with Katie, Kelly's half-sister. During "You Will Hurt Him", the house finally gets to meet Severide's half-sister Katie Nolan when she brings them lunch. Brian shows interest but Severide is very protective of his sister. She goes by the house again to bring them more food and tells Otis he should be home for dinner as Katie is coming over. They both bond over a game of Catan and end up kissing. Otis, then, asks Severide for his blessing as he wants to take Katie on a date. After messing up with him a little he eventually says yes. The two begin dating. Until she is kidnapped. Otis feels guilty he wasn't with her at the time it happened but Severide calms him and assures him it is not his fault. After she is found and taken to the hospital Katie makes the decision to move to Colorado. At the end of "Rhymes With Shout", Otis and Severide arrive to an empty and looted apartment. Shay gives Devon a key, and she steals all of their valuables, including Otis' collection piece (that later turns out to be completely worthless and fake). After this event Brian decides to leave the apartment and find his own space. Meanwhile, Cruz comes up to him and tells him that, since they are both "room-mateless", they should find a place together. It was revealed that Shay's runaway ex Devin absconded with their money and possessions. Later in the season, he and Cruz decide to room together. As the most tech-savvy of the crew, he becomes something of a cult figure amongst other firefighters due to his podcast, called "Good to be a goat" after Truck 81's mascot, about life as a firefighter. He often comes up with ideas and solutions for everything, much to his colleagues' amusement and derision. As of season 4, he was "promoted" to chauffeur as Cruz transferred to Squad 3. In "Joyriding", the day of the Union presidency vote, Mouch and his opponent Greg Sullivan have an all-important live debate on Otis' podcast. The debate is a disaster, Mouch opts to keep his integrity and to not use personal information on Sullivan that could ruin his run, thus losing the presidency. In "Just Drive the Truck", Cruz is suspended from driving for three months, pending investigation following the crash of Truck Co. 81 with Truck 66 from Welch's antagonistic Firehouse 105. Casey puts Otis as driver. In "The Nuclear Option", Otis' nephews come to visit the Firehouse and he is excited to take them on a ride while driving the Truck. Cruz's suspension is lifted, and he is now back in the driver's seat. However, on the last episode of the season Scott is kicked out of Squad 3 leaving a void. It's revealed that Cruz passed his squad certification and is now on squad. Otis is now the Truck driver. Dawson begins as a candidate, and Otis tries to prank her the same way the guys did to him when he first started, but since she was already at the house, she is aware of the pranks and manages to steer clear of them. Ever since Cruz broke up with Sylvie, Otis has shown interest in her. After the breakup, Sylvie comes up to him to return a book. After that conversation, Otis goes to Casey and says he might be in love with her. Casey tells him that it is crazy to even look at his best friend's ex the day after they broke up. During the entire season, Otis makes advances on Sylvie trying to go on a date with her. In "On the Warpath", he asks Sylvie if she has plans for the following night as Phantasm is showing at the Music Box. She has no idea what Phantasm is and the two are interrupted by Jimmy bringing Sylvie coffee. Brett gets herself into trouble, so Jimmy gives her a ride home. As they are both leaving, Otis tells Cruz that Phantasm was never going to happen. He stated his intentions, he even changed his looks but he finally realizes nothing would ever happen between him and Sylvie.

In season 1, Otis, Herrmann, and Dawson buy a bar, which they call Molly's. The bar is also seen on Chicago P.D. as it is popular with firefighters and cops. Otis is shown to be the more business-minded one and often had to remind Herrmann about paperwork for inspections and bills.

Otis is unabashedly proud of his Russian heritage and frequently speaks of his parents and his grandmother ("Baba"), although actor Yuri Sardarov is actually of Georgian and Armenian heritage. It is implied that Otis was either born in the United States or emigrated as a young child. He comes from a large family and every season has seen him introduce or speak of various relatives, with his grandmother even moving in and sleeping in his bunk bed. His father died of leukemia. Cruz was initially furious with Otis for only telling him the day "Baba", who spoke no English, shows up at their apartment but relents after Otis explains his reasons. In season 1 there was a running gag where he would tell his colleagues in any joint venture that he had "a cousin" who could come and help. For example, he gets his Russian cousin Zoya a job as a waitress at Molly's but incurs the wrath of business partners Herrmann and Dawson after they find out Zoya barely speaks any English.

In "I Will Be Walking", while changing in the locker room, Cruz asks him what happened to his back since he has a bruise the size of a bread basket. Otis gets suspicious about some bruises that appear on his back and hip. He asks Sylvie's opinion, who tells him to get it checked out by a doctor which he doesn't want to do fearing it might be something serious. He also asks Sylvie to keep it a secret from the house. In the episode "Kind of a Crazy Idea", eventually he decides to get it checked out by Dr. Halstead from Chicago Med. However, he still doesn't want to know the diagnosis and lies to Sylvie about having his blood results back and everything being ok. Later on, Sylvie finds out the truth and asks Cruz for help. Cruz enlists the help of Otis' grandmother, who after a visit to the Firehouse convinces him to get the tests done. Otis is diagnosed with immune thrombocytopenic purpura and went on medical leave. He returns to the firehouse, and he meets his temporary replacement and is convinced by Herrmann that Connie was trying to replace him permanently. Otis then takes Connie to the theater, and she tells him that he always has a place at 51. Otis, along with other Members of Chicago Fire Department Truck Company 81 are concerned about Borelli's Behavior following his brother's death. Other storylines include him still working at Molly's and still working as a member on truck.

In season 6, he goes into a relationship with Lily, whom he met when he visited a bar that was in the stages of closing, in what would become Molly's North.

In "The Chance to Forgive", while performing an evacuation on a house fire, he is shot in the neck and severely wounded. In a twist, the guns were inside the house and the ammunition was being fired due to the fire. He is eventually taken to Chicago Med, where Dr. Ethan Choi tells everyone that the bullet is lodged near his spinal cord and operating could cause serious problems. The owner of the guns won't be charged, since he owned them all legally and didn't intentionally hurt Otis. At the end, Otis gets through his surgery in one piece. Choi sticks his head into the room and realizes that Otis can't feel anything in his toes.

Otis returns to active duty in "The Strongest Among Us", having fully recovered from his injuries, and butts heads with Kidd over who gets to drive Truck 81. He dies in a mattress fire after failing to get to safety in the Season 8 premiere, devastating the entire firehouse, especially Cruz.

Crossover appearances

- Chicago P.D.: "Stepping Stone" (January 8, 2014)
- Chicago P.D.: "The Docks" (May 14, 2014)
- Chicago P.D.: "Life Is Fluid" (September 30, 2015)
- Chicago P.D.: "Natural Born Storyteller" (October 7, 2015)

=== Joe Cruz ===
Joe Cruz
- First appearance: Pilot (episode 1.01)
- Portrayed by: Joe Minoso

In-universe information
- Full name: Josef Ignacio Cruz
- Occupation: Firefighter, CFD; Dance instructor
- Family: Unnamed father Leon Cruz (younger brother); Luis (uncle)
- Spouse: Chloe Allen (m. 2020)
- Children: Javier Alejandro Cruz (adoptive son); Brian Leon Cruz (son); Unborn twin daughters
- Relatives: Earl Allen (father-in-law); Janine Allen (mother-in-law)
- Nationality: American

Career
- Department: Chicago Fire Department: Squad 3 (S4–present); Truck 81 (S1–3)
- Years of service: 2006–present
- Rank: Firefighter
- Badge No.: 6393

Portrayed by Joe Minoso

Firefighter Joe Cruz (season 2 – present; recurring season 1) is the designated chauffeur for Truck 81. In season 3, he tries out for squad and has transferred to Squad 3 by the season 4 premiere.

Having grown up in the gangster-infested neighborhoods of Humboldt Park where he was regularly "lulled to sleep by gunfire", many of his peers were gangsters and he is constantly trying to keep his younger brother Leon out of the local gang. He is haunted by a decision that he made on the job related to his brother that later affects his own safety and the safety of his fellow firemen, forcing Casey to discipline him. Indeed, during a fire, he lets Flaco, the boss of his brother's gang, die, so Casey threatens to go to the police about Flaco if Cruz does not resign. Casey later reconsiders his decision. When Leon realizes what his older brother did, he vows not to let Joe down and enrolls at a local community college. Sergeant Voight seeks Cruz's permission to send Leon back into the gang, albeit undercover, after a little girl is killed in a drive-by shooting in his neighborhood so that the Chicago PD can shut down the gang once and for all. The takedown is successful but comes at a cost: Leon takes a bullet and eventually leaves Chicago for his own safety and starts a new life away from gang influence in Florida.

Cruz is generally well-liked by his coworkers and is often seen cracking jokes and exchanging banter with the rest of the crew. He and Otis often bicker with one another in the lounge during downtime over the most trivial matters. They later share an apartment together, thus referring to their arrangement as "Crotis" (a portmanteau of Cruz and Otis).

At the end of season 1 into a portion of season 2, Joe begins a relationship with Zoya, Otis's Russian immigrant cousin, and decides he wants to marry her to get her to stay, but she feels that is not right, so she leaves. In season 3, he begins dating the new paramedic, Sylvie Brett.

Seeing the success of the bar Molly's owned by Dawson, Herrmann, and Otis, Cruz decides along with Mouch to be part of the project. Cruz comes up with the idea of making "Molly's II" a truck. This project convinces Herrmann and is accepted. Finding a truck is difficult, but Newhouse finds one on the condition of being a 20% associate.

Joe is the driver of Truck 81 but receives a suspension from Deputy District Chief Joel Tiberg when 81 gets involved in a T-bone collision with Truck 66 from Firehouse 105 in Austin as they ere both en route to the same structure fire. The collision results in Mouch sustaining a major eye laceration, two guys from Truck 66 having a broken arm for one and a broken leg for the other, and the driver, Jason Molina, being knocked unconscious. At first, he is accused of blowing a red light because he forgot the color of the traffic light and because he blew another red light 30 seconds before the accident. But when Molina wakes up, he confesses that his Lieutenant, Tommy Welch, ordered him to beat Truck 81 so they could take command of operations at the scene. Cruz is cleared of the accusation, and is not charged with manslaughter. He still gets 3 months suspension' from driving the truck and is temporarily replaced by Otis, who was next in line to drive 81. However, Chief Boden manages to reduce his suspension.

Cruz is a dance instructor and teaches Zumba when off-duty, a fact that he keeps a secret until Brett coincidentally turns up at his Zumba class because she lives nearby. He asks her to keep it a secret since he does not want to be ridiculed by his colleagues at 51. A running gag in the show is Cruz's inability to cook; he tries to fill in as the firehouse cook after Mills is promoted from Candidate status, but his cooking is often met with ridicule from the rest of the firehouse. He occasionally works as a bouncer at a bar. Since Cruz regularly talks to her about the class, Casey becomes suspicious and talks to Brett about romantic relationships inside the firehouse. To clear the misunderstanding, she reveals to him that Cruz is actually her instructor. Casey talks to Dawson, who tells Herrmann and so on until the whole firehouse knows about it. In "Chopper", the guys from Truck 81 and Squad 3 come to assist one of his classes. In "Spartacus", after Scott Rice is given the boot, Chief Boden announces that Cruz received his squad certification just before his shift started, and he is subsequently given Rice's spot just as a call comes in. At first, Otis is pissed Cruz did not tell him first due to the recent tensions between Truck and Squad but later congratulates him at Molly's.

In "Hiding Not Seeking", he grows increasingly concerned about Brett after she volunteers to go undercover to one of the bombing suspect's houses. After it is successful, he begins to take it out on her.

In "The Chance to Forgive", he becomes too personal when a call to a house fire goes awry and Otis is severely wounded. Cruz yells at the guy as he leaves the hospital in shame and vows revenge after Otis finally wakes up. Later in the hospital church, the father of the gun owner thanks Cruz for saving his life and says he didn't know his son had all those guns. When the call for another house fire at the same address as the first encounter comes in, the gun owner tries to kill himself due to his guilt over the events that play out. Cruz goes in and gets him. Moved by watching the kid nearly die, Cruz encourages him to stay alive.

At the start of Season 6's "Slamigan", Cruz creates a firefighting tool of the same name that combines a sledgehammer with a Halligan. Despite his annoyance of Mouch and Herrmann taking over the business side and credit for his hard work, the Slamigan proves to be an effective tool in the field, and he has used it on multiple occasions. Initially, his attempts to market the tool are hindered by his lingering feelings for Brett affecting his judgment, but in Season 8's "Welcome to Crazytown", he successfully proves the tool's worth at a firefighter expo against a flashier copy.

In "Going to War", Cruz saves a woman named Chloe Allen from a high-rise fire who in the next episode shows a romantic interest in him. Later, he asks her to accompany him to a firefighter picnic, and the two are officially dating by "The Solution to Everything". However, in "Always a Catch", Chloe is injured in a highway pileup and rushed to the hospital via helicopter. Cruz stays by her side with her parents, who remark he is good for her, and she recovers from her injuries. In Season 8's "Infection Part 1", Joe reveals his plans to propose to Chloe, but due to Otis's death and seeing the ramifications of being with a firefighter, Chloe breaks up with him. However, in the next episode, Brett manages to convince Chloe to give him another chance, and upon learning that Cruz was going to propose, she reconciles with him and happily accepts his engagement. Later, he asks Severide to be his best man.

In "My Lucky Day", Cruz reveals that Chloe is pregnant to Herrmann while they're trapped in an elevator, something that Cruz asks him to keep secret because he doesn't want to reveal it right away. He tells the rest of the firehouse in "Dead of Winter" when he gets good news from the doctor. In that same episode, Chloe reveals that they are having a boy. In "Two Hundred", Cruz and the rest of 51 are present for the birth of his son, Brian Leon, who is named after his late best friend, Otis. Later, Cruz rescues a boy named Javier, who he would adopt.

=== Randall "Mouch" McHolland ===
Randall McHolland
- First appearance: Pilot (episode 1.01)
- Portrayed by: Christian Stolte

In-universe information
- Full name: Randall McHolland
- Nickname: Mouch
- Occupation: Veteran Firefighter, CFD; Security guard
- Family: Seamus McHolland (grandfather; deceased); Unnamed father
- Spouses: Trudy Platt (m. 2016)
- Children: Lizzie Shaffer (daughter)
- Relatives: Robert Platt (father-in-law; deceased); Logan Platt (brother-in-law)

Career
- Department: Chicago Fire Department: Truck 81 (seasons 1–13); Engine 51 (season 13 – present)
- Years of service: 1983 - present
- Rank: Truck Engineer; Lieutenant (season 13 – present)

Portrayed by Christian Stolte

Firefighter Randall "Mouch" McHolland (season 2 – present; recurring season 1) is one of the veteran firefighters of Truck 81. As the longest-serving member of Truck 81, he, along with fellow veteran Christopher Herrmann, is often seen as the ringleaders and respected by the rest of the crew as such. Mouch serves as union representative for the members of the station whenever they face disciplinary action or a lawsuit and is knowledgeable in the legalities and political side of the fire department. He has a part-time job as a security guard. Instead of "McHolland", he has "Mouch" written on the back of his turnout coat. With the help of Herrmann, he joins the race for fire union president but loses his chance to win due to his refusal to play dirty. When Firehouse 51 is about to be shut down, Mouch is the one who rallies the union's executive committee to stand up to Gail McLeod.

Infrequently referred to as "Randy", Mouch gained his peculiar nickname due to the fact that he can almost always be found on the couch watching television when not on a call ("half man, half couch"). He offends Boden's secretary Connie, who has the couch moved to the space outside Boden's office. He spends much of the episode distressing over the loss of "his" couch before succumbing to Herrmann's advice to apologize to Connie. She finally returns the couch to the lounge after Mouch apologizes twice.

Mouch was in a long-distance relationship with a Japanese woman named Mari. In season 1, Mouch was taking Japanese lessons. She is from Japan and comes to visit Mouch in A Hell of a Ride. She leaves in A Problem House. Mouch says he will try to visit her, but this never happens and they end up breaking up. Later, Shay sets him up with a "Golden Oldies" dating profile, and he acquires a blind date. His lack of social skills around women hinders him and his colleagues have had to "coach" him on the idiosyncrasies of taking women out on dates. He meets Chicago PD Sergeant Trudy Platt (Amy Morton), who also appears in Chicago P.D., by accident at Chief Boden's wedding reception and they have been dating ever since. As such, Mouch has appeared on Chicago P.D., usually to visit Platt. In season 4, he finally finds the courage to propose to Platt but it goes down the drain and they have to part ways after he is called to an emergency. Platt eventually proposes to spare him the embarrassment and they agree to get married. They marry in an intimate ceremony at Molly's, in the presence of Mouch's co-workers from 51 and Platt's co-workers from the 21st District. They went to the Wisconsin Dells for their honeymoon.

In a Chicago PD episode "All Cylinders Firing", after Platt is a victim of brutal assault, Mouch goes to Chicago Med to see her and while there, is questioned by Voight and Lindsay. He takes offense when he is labeled a suspect by them. But he affirms his innocence and demands to know the truth about what had happened. He is seen on another Chicago PD episode "Profiles" consoling his wife after she is injured during a bombing of a TV station.

Towards the end of season 5, Mouch considers retiring from the fire department.

In the season 5 finale, Mouch, while trapped inside of a burning factory, seems to be having a heart attack. In the season 6 premiere, he is back at 51 with all members returning to normal lives. He delivers a moving speech about how close he came to "walking off of this job". He says "while I was lying down on the ground in that burning factory, the one thing I thought about was it wasn't enough". He treasures the time that he has with his brothers and sisters at 51. He hopes he will never have to look down that dark tunnel ever again. He realizes he has not had enough time with Trudy or his coworkers at 51. He signs the whole firehouse second shift up for a Firefighter's muster. He believes that his friends at 51 have been there for him day in and day out no matter what.

In "A Real Shot in the Arm", he and Trudy use their savings to buy out Otis' share of Molly's after his death. Initially unwilling to buy out his shares, he does so after Herrmann reveals to Ritter that he isn't as much fun anymore since Dawson gave away her piece of ownership and Otis' death meant that his shares would go to his brothers, who want nothing to do with Molly's.

=== Jimmy Borrelli ===
Jimmy Borelli
- First appearance: "Let It Burn" (episode 4.01)
- Last appearance: "A Real Wake-Up Call" (episode 5.02)
- Portrayed by: Steven R. McQueen

In-universe information
- Full name: James Borelli
- Occupation: Firefighter, CFD
- Family: Unnamed father Unnamed mother (deceased); Danny Borrelli (brother; deceased); Anthony Borrelli (cousin)
- Relatives: Stacy Borelli (sister-in-law); Unnamed nephews

Career
- Department: Chicago Fire Department: Truck 81
- Years of service: 2015–2016
- Rank: Firefighter (Candidate)

Portrayed by Steven R. McQueen

Firefighter Candidate Jimmy Borrelli (seasons 4–5) is the newest Candidate at Firehouse 51 introduced in the season 4 premiere. He comes from a family of firefighters "who drink testosterone for breakfast". His older brother Danny (Andy Ahrens), a firefighter at Engine 67, pranks him by dousing him with beer, dumping him in the trunk of his car wrapped up with duct tape, and dropping him off at 51 in front of a bemused Chief Boden, Lieutenant Casey, and most of Truck 81. An unimpressed Chief Boden tells Borrelli to go home and never come back to 51 but Jimmy returns to apologize and promises to earn his place. True to his word, he shows himself to be hardworking and dedicated, earning the acceptance of his truck company and the trust of his lieutenant. Casey comments that Borrelli was one of the best candidates he has had on 81 in recent years. Danny tries to get Jimmy into the same firehouse and is rebuffed by his younger brother. He later explained that he had promised their dying mother that he would protect Jimmy, hence his actions, but stops pursuing the matter after Jimmy explains that he wants to stay at 51 due to the "family" atmosphere. Like Mills before him, Borrelli is assigned to kitchen duty and menial tasks and occasionally subjected to pranks and good-natured ribbing from the more senior firefighters. For example, Gabby Dawson's brother Detective Antonio Dawson talks him into representing 51 at the "Battle of the Badges" boxing match organized by Mouch, but his co-workers at 51 intentionally leave out the fact that the detective is a seasoned amateur boxer.

Borrelli is attracted to Paramedic in Charge Jessica "Chili" Chilton, and they begin seeing each other until both Lieutenant Casey and Chief Patterson catch them making out and give Borrelli a stern warning about fraternization rules. Chili tries to brush it off, but Borrelli respects Casey and asks Chili if they could "cool it", to which she angrily accuses him of not being serious in their relationship. Their relationship is further strained after Chili spirals out of control when she starts drinking to cope with the death of her sister and repeatedly refuses help from him or Sylvie Brett. Chili is then fired from 51 and enter rehab and Brett becomes the new PIC. Borelli is transferred to Ambulance 61 as his spot as a Candidate at 51 is under threat due to budget cuts and reshuffling of manpower.

In "Where the Collapse Started", Danny comes over and asks Jimmy for some help with a bar deal. But after Jimmy finds out what's really going on, he refuses. Danny becomes angry and leaves. Later, the house gets a call for a structure collapse where Truck 70 and Engine 67, Danny's company, are already on scene. Danny goes into the building along with Truck 81 and Squad 3 and ignores Jimmy. After the firefighters find and evacuate victims with the building crumbling around them, Severide reports to Chief Boden and he gives the order to evacuate. But Danny believes he heard someone still call out and asks Boden to bring the victim out so he is given one minute. But the roof collapses moments later and Jimmy rushes in. Upon arrival, Jimmy requests Squad assistance for extrication since Danny is pinned but Boden is hesitant. Boden himself then goes inside and pulls Jimmy back just as more debris falls on Danny, killing him. Outside, firefighters, paramedics, and cops line up to form an aisle leading to Ambulance 61 and salute as some firefighters bring out Danny's body and Jimmy leads the way to the ambo. Jimmy then takes some time off after this incident. The next evening, Jimmy shows up at Casey/Severide's apartment and tells Severide that he believes Boden made a mistake by giving Danny one minute that he didn't have. He then storms off after Severide tells him to cool off. In "The Hose or the Animal", he files an official grievance against Boden.

Borrelli returns to Truck 81 in season 5 but the character was written out in the second episode after being injured on the job. He suffers serious injuries to his hand, face, neck and left eye in an explosion. It is implied, based on Dr. Halstead's prognosis, that his career as a firefighter is over. In the third episode, Boden mentions that Borrelli's family had him transferred to a long-term care facility.

=== Stella Kidd ===
Stella Kidd
- Chicago Fire character
- First appearance: Chicago Fire: Bad for the Soul (episode 4.15)
- Created by: Matt Olmstead
- Portrayed by: Miranda Rae Mayo

In-universe information
- Aliases: Stella Severide; Stella Kidd-Severide
- Gender: Female
- Occupation: CFD Firefighter; Manager of Molly's
- Family: Unnamed father (deceased); Unnamed mother (deceased); Laverne Williams (aunt); Ray (uncle); Cole Williams (cousin); Noah Williams (cousin)
- Spouses: Grant Smith (div. 2016) Kelly Severide (m. 2022)
- Significant others: Zach Torbett (ex-boyfriend); Keith (ex-boyfriend)
- Children: Unborn child (miscarriage); Isaiah (former foster son)
- Relatives: Benjamin Severide (father-in-law; deceased); Jennifer Sheridan (mother-in-law); Katie Nolan (sister-in-law); Jack Damon (brother-in-law); John Sheridan (grandfather-in-law); Unnamed uncle-in-law
- Nationality: American
- Hometown: Milwaukee, Wisconsin
- Residence: Chicago, Illinois

Career
- Department: Chicago Fire Department; Truck 81
- Years of service: 2012-present
- Rank: Firefighter (seasons 4–9); Lieutenant (seasons 9 – present)

Portrayed by Miranda Rae Mayo

Stella Kidd (season 5 – present; recurring season 4) is the newest transfer at Truck 81. She has known Gabby Dawson from the academy and transferred from a firehouse in Auburn. When news of her transfer first reached 51 it is met with much derision as Borelli, by then a popular figure with the crew of 81, had left his candidate position to join Brett at Ambulance 61 due to manpower changes. Like Dawson, she quickly shows that she is able to hold her own in a male-dominated firehouse. Her first appearance is "Bad for the Soul". When Kidd first arrives at the House, Dawson acts as if they have problems, just kidding around since it is revealed they are good old friends. When asked she says that the only thing she heard about Firehouse 51 was that they all live together. She tells the House that she is recently divorced and is enjoying the single life. Kidd says she goes out whenever she wants, eats at nice restaurants and whenever she's lonely she sleeps with her ex, something that apparently he is alright with. Kidd quickly proves to be a worthy firefighter and a great asset to the House.

While writing her name on her new locker, Kidd asks Dawson whose locker it was before hers since it smells like cologne. Dawson tells her that it used to belong to one of Severide's old friends, Scott Rice, which didn't end well. When Dawson says Severide's name, Kidd acts suspiciously shy and "blushy", but they are interrupted by Severide, cutting the conversation short. Severide then apologizes for "the most embarrassing night of his career" since he didn't know she was married and showed up with a six-pack at her back door. Her husband went crazy and actually wanted to press charges against Severide. The awkward situation is put behind them and everything seems ok. Grant shows up at the firehouse looking for Stella. Saying he misses her and feels so lonely it's like he is going to die. She then goes to the Turn-Out Gear room with him to administer him a B-12 shot.

It is implied that she and Severide have known each other at some point prior to her transfer. They begin a "no strings attached" relationship but it hits a hurdle when her ex Grant shows up. Stella shares with Severide that Grant is using again and that she is worried about him. During the last episode Grant shows up at Molly's, Stella and Severide walk in together causing Grant to fight with Kidd once again. A while later, Grant texts Kidd. She tries to call him back and realizes he is on something. Worried that something might have happened to him, she locates his phone. The team leaves the House to find an overdosing Grant. At the hospital, Stella tells him that he needs help to get clean. Grant insists she is all he needs. Nonetheless, Stella is done and Grant shouts at her to leave. Kidd leaves, worried. Dr Charles calms her down telling her that rock bottom always looks ugly but they will do their part to help him. His behavior becomes erratic and escalates but she tries to deny that there was a problem, even after he attempted to assault Severide and overdosed. The final straw came when he escaped from the hospital to sneak into her apartment with the intent of hurting Severide, but does not go through with it. She finally makes the decision to force him to go to rehab by severing all ties with him. Stella's parents died when she was a teenager. Her mom and dad were addicts and the latter was abusive to her and her brother.

Herrmann and Kidd get on a discussion about who is the best manager. Stella states that she ran the best pub in Milwaukee for 2 1/2 years. Dawson then proposes they settle things by doing the "Bar Olympics": 2 contestants, 10 events, winner takes all. Kidd wins. However, instead of the money she wants to help them manage Molly's. One of the changes she introduces to the bar is the artisan ice cubes, the giant perfectly clear ice cubes, that require a special machine to make them, so they can charge more per drink and sell more cocktails than beer. She finally convinces them to buy the machine. However, later on the House is called to a fire at Molly's that apparently started because of said machine. Stella feels awful about what happened so she decides to fix the damage herself.

Since then, Stella's biggest recurring theme is her on-again, off-again relationship with Kelly Severide, but even when they aren't together in season 5, she still cares for him greatly and encourages him in his new romance with Anna, a pediatric nurse in remission. However, when Anna's health takes a turn for the worse, she continues to support him emotionally and comforts him when Anna dies. In season 6, Stella is kicked out of her apartment and Kelly offers for her to stay at his place until then. However, she runs afoul with Hope, a deceitful friend of Brett's after discovering she and Kelly slept together. However, Brett points out she was merely jealous of Hope, but her friend's true colors came to light when she attempted to transfer Stella to the Public relations department.

Soon, Stella and Brett compete for the affections for Zach, a lieutenant in the HAZMAT unit, with Brett ultimately throwing in the towel. Initially, their relationship starts off great, but both her and Severide's lingering feelings for each other begin to bubble up again, especially when Kelly goes against orders to save Stella from a fire involving exploding ammunition. The two try a 'friends with benefits' relationship, but quickly evolves into something more. But, her insecurities about their relationship emerge from learning about his past relationships, his tenuous relationship with his father and an old ex-girlfriend returning seeking his help. Ultimately, after putting some distance between them by her moving into Hermann's guest house, her fears are put to rest when Kelly remains faithful after the business with his ex is finished.

Early in season 7, Stella is gravely injured during a twenty-five story fire in attempt to try and save Severide, almost losing her lung in the process. However, thanks to Doctor Rhodes, her lungs were saved and she returns to work. However, her relationship with Severide takes a hit when an old friend of her comes to town and Kelly thinks he has feelings for her. Things get worse when Kelly's father dies and his resulting grief causes them to split up again. The two deal with it differently with Stella leaning on her girl friends at the firehouse, but after helping Severide capture an arsonist his father was looking for, they ultimately restarted their relationship on firmer ground.

Following the death of Otis in Season 8, Kidd is made the chauffeur of Truck 81. During this time, Boden picks Stella to attend a leadership seminar, seeing she has potential. He was proven right and offers her chances to prove herself by teaching at the academy. However, the resulting exhaustion from trying to live up to expectations leads her to being zoned out on calls, and she gets told off by Casey. Eventually, she got into a small car accident in front of the firehouse. While Boden apologizes for putting too much on Stella, she ultimately thanks him for the chance and the two remain close, even offering to participate in a diet with him on his wife's behalf. Her ambitions grow again when she starts a program for at-risk teens called 'Girls on Fire'. With help from Brett, Foster and Seager (a Lieutenant Severide worked with in OFI), her program is a hit and has many girls signing up for her group. Girls on Fire is noted as a real development program for girls and young women providing "firefighting and resilience programs" in several parts of the world.

In Season 9, in the midst of COVID-19, Stella's Girls on Fire program is shut down, despite repeated attempts to get it back up and running. However, after showing she was capable of making command decisions and saving Severide's life from a fire, Boden recommends her to take the Lieutenant's exam and managed to get her program restarted at the firehouse. In the Season 9 Episode "What Comes Next", she takes the exam and later learns that she passed it. With Casey's encouragement, Severide proposes to her in a fire, and she happily accepts. The news of their engagement is first broken to Casey, who is elated to hear the news, and then to the rest of the firehouse.

In Season 10, she spends a couple of episodes starting a Girls on Fire program in Boston.

=== Emily Foster ===
Emily Foster
- First appearance: "A Closer Eye" (7.01)
- Last appearance: "51's Original Bell" (8.20)
- Portrayed by: Annie Ilonzeh

In-universe information
- Occupation: Paramedic, CFD; Spin instructor
- Family: Unnamed mother (deceased)

Career
- Department: Chicago Fire Department: Ambulance 61
- Years of service: 2018–2020
- Rank: Paramedic

Portrayed by Annie Ilonzeh

EMT Emily Foster (seasons 7–8) is introduced as the new paramedic at Firehouse 51, replacing Gabriella Dawson after she stays in Puerto Rico. Initially, she and Brett get off to a rough start due to Brett still being hurt by Dawson leaving. But Foster quickly gets settled into the firehouse and reveals to Brett she was a former medical student, but due to an unknown cause in her personal life, she cheated on her SATs and was promptly dismissed. However, her more advanced medical training allows her to accurately diagnose patients' afflictions, but she has overstepped her boundaries at times, as she is a paramedic, not a doctor. Later, she is revealed to be bisexual after Brett tries to defend her after she was stood up on a date, only to learn her date was with a woman. In "You Choose", she goes on a date with Dr. Jim Shaw, the doctor she suspected and later cleared, of overdosing a patient. In "Make This Right", she has a one-night stand with him and tries to break it off. At the end, he shows up in Molly's and whispers to her that he will back down. In "The Plunge", his continued harassment takes a toll on her job when she gets called to Lakeshore Hospital where an anonymous complaint, implied to be Dr. Shaw, has been filed against both Foster and Sylvie Brett, that could potentially cause the revocation of their paramedic licenses. Foster finally decides to come forward about the harassment to Chief Boden. Then, she decides to confront Shaw herself, and with Brett backing her up. In the middle of Lakeshore Hospital and with a half-dozen other women watching, Foster tells him to "come at me with all you got." So Shaw does literally, following her out into the parking lot—where Brett has called in Boden and the rest of Firehouse 51. She leaves to go to medical school in The Season 8 Finale "51's Original Bell".

=== Darren Ritter ===
Darren Ritter
- First appearance: "Going to War" (7.02)
- Last appearance: "Primary Search" (14.02)
- Portrayed by: Daniel Kyri

In-universe information
- Occupation: CFD Firefighter
- Family: Anthony (uncle; deceased)
- Significant others: Dwayne Morris (boyfriend); Eric Woodruff (ex-boyfriend)
- Nationality: American
- Date of birth: 1997

Career
- Department: New York City Fire Department; Chicago Fire Department (formerly); Engine 37 (Season 7); Engine 51 (Seasons 7–13); Truck 81 (Seasons 13–14)
- Rank: Firefighter

Portrayed by Daniel Kyri

Firefighter Darren Ritter (season 9 – present; recurring seasons 7–8) is a firefighter candidate at Firehouse 51, assigned to Engine Company 51. He was previously the candidate for Engine 37 but was kicked out of his firehouse after freezing up on an apartment fire call. He is sent to the "floater pool", where he took temporary assignments before initially resigning. He is offered a second chance by Mouch and assigned to Engine 51 under Herrmann after Herrmann kicks a firefighter off Engine. He owns a Dalmatian named Tuesday, who hangs around the firehouse when Ritter is unable to find someone to watch her while he is on shift. It is revealed that he became a firefighter because of his uncle, a New York firefighter who was working on 9/11. In "Make This Right", he tries to get Mouch and Otis to make amends after Mouch gets sick of Otis' old man jokes, even going as far as wearing a tacky costume in Molly's to help bring them together before Herrmann tells them to make up. In "Move a Wall", he injures his shoulder on a call after a car runs over a hose he was carrying, leading to Casey berating Herrmann. He is shown to be adept at picking up signs of depression, noticing that a retiring firefighter was showing signs of depression before others noticed. He later revealed that his firefighter uncle ended up committing suicide after retiring, showing signs of depression. In the season 8 premiere, "Sacred Ground", he is chastised by Herrmann after disobeying the latter's order to escape from the mattress fire that had later taken the life of Otis and is later transferred to Truck 81 at Herrmann's request. When Ritter goes to apologize to Herrmann, Herrmann reveals that he is not mad that Ritter disobeyed his command as it probably meant that he wasn't a good enough lieutenant to him. Herrmann also reveals that he will transfer Ritter back to Engine 51 when Casey finds the right firefighter to replace Otis. It is revealed in "A Real Shot in the Arm" that Ritter is gay, and seeing someone. In "Then Nick Porter Happened", his boyfriend Eric is introduced, where he is shown to be a travel agent helping Kidd plan a birthday trip for Severide.

=== Blake Gallo ===
Blake Gallo
- Chicago Fire character
- First appearance: Chicago Fire: A Real Shot in the Arm (episode 8.02)
- Last appearance: Chicago Fire: Barely Gone (episode 12.01)
- Created by: Matt Olmstead
- Portrayed by: Alberto Rosende

In-universe information
- Gender: Male
- Occupation: CFD Firefighter
- Family: Unnamed Father (deceased); Unnamed Mother (deceased); Madeline Gallo (sister; deceased); Lacey Hoffman (aunt); Carmine (uncle); Unnamed Cousin
- Significant others: Violet Mikami (ex-girlfriend); Gianna Mackey (fling); Tracy Herrmann (fling); Cara (fling)
- Nationality: American
- Residence: Detroit, Michigan; Chicago, Illinois (formerly)

Career
- Department: Chicago Fire Department: Engine 90 (Season 8, Episode 2); Truck 81 (Season 8, Episode 3–Season 11, Episode 22)
- Rank: Firefighter

Portrayed by Alberto Rosende

Firefighter Blake Gallo (seasons 8–12) is introduced as a young firefighter who is so committed to his career that he is willing to take significant risks to his life and disobey orders. He starts out as a candidate for Truck 90, where he catches the eye of Captain Matthew Casey as he free-climbs up a building to make a save. Casey attempts to transfer Gallo to Truck 81 but is initially rejected by Boden out of fear that Boden would lose another man. Casey attempts to convince Boden a second time but only gets the transfer after Kelly Severide convinces Boden to give Gallo a shot.

It was revealed in "Badlands", that Gallo was inspired to become a firefighter after he was rescued from a house fire in West Lawn when he was 12, and that he spent "everyday in the firehouse" after school and was a junior firefighter. It is later revealed by the West Lawn Battalion Chief that Gallo was the only survivor of the fire, and he lost both his parents and his younger sister.

In "What Went Wrong", he disobeys a direct order not to breach at a fire call and gets punished by Casey since his future in the CFD was put into question. After Boden reveals Gallo's past to Casey, Casey tries to get him to open up, but Gallo initially does not say anything other than the facts of what took place. It is only after fellow firefighter candidate Darren Ritter convinces Gallo to open up to Casey that it's revealed that Gallo feels guilty for not getting to his sister in the fire that took her and his parents' life since he had heard her crying for help, and he hid instead of helping her.

In "Shut It Down", he takes a call personally when a little girl is injured in a gas explosion and fire, visiting her in the hospital after he is treated for burns he received in that fire and even buying a blanket for her for whenever she wakes from her coma. It is implied by Casey to Kidd that he is feeling lost since the girl injured in the fire was around the age Gallo's sister was when she died.

In "Hold Our Ground", he begins a fling with Violet Mikami, an old rival from the academy and a paramedic over at Firehouse 20. They begin a relationship in "Then Nick Porter Happened", where Gallo reveals they're going on a date. In "Shut It Down", their relationship appears to gain traction when she purchases a Fitbit so that they can compete on their step counts.

During "51's Original Bell", Gallo becomes jealous of Violet seeing other men, despite him being the one who suggested they be open. Violet and Gallo argue over their relationship and presumably break up because of Violet being upset with him having trust issues.

In Season 9, Gallo becomes attracted to Gianna Mackey, who is a childhood friend of Joe. He attempts to ask permission but Joe refuses because of his over protective attitude with her though this does not stop Gianna who makes advances on him to his discomfort.

After Mackey's departure, Violet comes to Firehouse 51 as Mackey's replacement. Gallo is relieved when he finds out that it is for one shift only as he gets flustered around her. Later, when Violet reveals that she will be working full time, Ritter tells him that he has to pull himself together.

In Season 10, he yells at Lieutenant Jason Pelham "I'm not a Candidate anymore".

=== Gianna Mackey ===
Gianna Mackey
- Chicago Fire character
- First appearance: "Rattle Second City" (episode 9.01)
- Last appearance: "Double Red" (episode 9.09)
- Created by: Matt Olmstead
- Portrayed by: Adriyan Rae

In-universe information
- Full name: Gianna Christine Mackey
- Gender: Female
- Occupation: Paramedic
- Family: Unnamed Parents; Dex Mackey (brother; deceased)
- Significant other: Blake Gallo (fling)
- Nationality: American

Career
- Department: Chicago Fire Department: Ambulance 61; Firehouse 33
- Rank: Paramedic; Paramedic in Charge

Portrayed by Adriyan Rae

Paramedic Gianna Mackey (season 9) is introduced as the new paramedic on Ambulance 61, replacing Emily Foster after the latter decides to return to medical school. It is revealed in her opening scene that she and Joe Cruz grew up in the same neighborhood and that he was the one who recommended she fill the open position at 51. Her first call is shown to be harrowing, as she and Brett are forced to treat a man suffering from a drug overdose at gunpoint by the man's brother. They are then targeted after the man does not survive, eventually leading to Brett and Mackey going off a bridge at the end of "Rattle Second City". The beginning of the subsequent episode "That Kind of Heat" reveals that they both survived the fall, albeit with a minor head wound for Mackey. Throughout the same episode, Mackey is seen questioning whether she should continue to be at 51, eventually returning after some convincing from Cruz and a promise that he won't be as overprotective as he was in the previous episode. She is also shown to have an attraction to Blake Gallo, something that Cruz tries to shut down almost immediately.

Gallo saves Mackey's life during an explosion on a call, which Cruz is grateful for but still does not give him permission to pursue her. The two eventually sleep together in "Blow This Up Somehow", much to Cruz's dismay, but he eventually lets it go since his upcoming child distracts him from interfering. Mackey departs 51 in "Double Red" to take a paramedic position at Firehouse 33 that has a better opportunity for career advancement.

=== Violet Mikami ===
Violet Mikami
- Chicago Fire character
- First appearance: "Hold Our Ground" (8.10)
- Created by: Matt Olmstead
- Portrayed by: Hanako Greensmith

In-universe information
- Nickname: Vi
- Gender: Female
- Occupation: Paramedic
- Family: Unnamed father Unnamed mother
- Significant others: Evan Hawkins (boyfriend; deceased); Blake Gallo (ex-boyfriend); Flynn Calhoun (ex-boyfriend); Sam Carver (love interest)
- Nationality: American
- Date of birth: October 1997

Career
- Department: Chicago Fire Department: Ambulance 61; Ambulance 99
- Rank: Paramedic (seasons 9–12); Paramedic in Charge (seasons 8; 12 – present)

Portrayed by Hanako Greensmith

Paramedic Violet Mikami (season 10 – present; recurring seasons 8–9) is introduced in "Hold Our Ground" as a paramedic from Firehouse 20 and an old rival of firefighter Blake Gallo from their days at the Fire Academy. Their first interaction is shown at a car accident call, where she berates Gallo for removing a victim without properly putting a c-collar on him first. Gallo then defends his actions, saying that the fire would have killed the victim if he did. Their arguments are viewed as signs of flirtations, as viewed by fellow firefighter Darren Ritter. The episode ends with them sleeping together after Gallo admits that he was watching her at the academy. In "Where We End Up", their fling continues as they have sex in the exercise room at Firehouse 20 when Firehouse 51 has to share space with them. In "Then Nick Porter Happened", it is revealed by Gallo that they have started a relationship and that they are going on a date soon. In "Shut It Down", she buys Gallo a Fitbit so that she can compete with him on their step counts. During "51's Original Bell", Gallo becomes jealous of Violet seeing other men, despite him being the one who suggested they be open. The pair argue over their relationship and presumably break up because of Violet being upset with him having trust issues.

In season nine, Chief Boden asks her to temporarily transfer to Firehouse 51 to fill the spot on Ambulance 61 after Gianna Mackey leaves after a promotion. Afterward, Brett convinces her to permanently transfer to Firehouse 51, stating that they work well together. She is shown as a brainiac who knows a lot about chemistry. Gallo is flustered around her at first, but later, the duo, along with Ritter, become great friends. At the end of season 9, Gallo states that he is happy that there is no more sexual tension between them, prompting Violet to kiss him at Molly's. In the next episode, Gallo asks her out, but she coincidentally finds out that Gallo went out with Mackey too and rejects him, thinking he goes for all paramedics in 51.

In Season 10, she, Gallo, and Ritter start a brewery business together, although Violet and Gallo's constant bickering frustrates Ritter at times. In "Two Hundred", she is jealous when someone flirts with Gallo.

=== Sam Carver ===
Sam Carver
- Chicago Fire character
- First appearance: Chicago Fire: Hold on Tight (episode 11.01)
- Last appearance: Chicago Fire: Frostbite Blue (episode 14.11)
- Created by: Matt Olmstead
- Portrayed by: Jake Lockett

In-universe information
- Nickname: Carver
- Gender: Male
- Occupation: Firefighter
- Family: Unnamed father Unnamed mother Nathan Carver (brother)
- Significant others: Tori (ex-girlfriend); Violet Mikami (love interest); Wendy Seager (fling)
- Nationality: American
- Hometown: Texas
- Residence: Denver, Colorado; Chicago, Illinois (formerly)

Career
- Department: Denver Fire Department; Chicago Fire Department (formerly)
- Rank: Firefighter (seasons 11–13)

Portrayed by Jake Lockett

Firefighter Sam Carver (season 13; recurring seasons 11–12) is the newest transfer at Truck 81. He had known Stella Kidd from the fire academy.

In Season 11, his brother Nathan Carver shows back up in his life asking for a lot of money. Kidd pushes Sam to explain and he opens up about it. Kidd is supportive and sympathetic towards the firefighter. Carver decides to give the money that his brother asks for to him. Kidd crashes the exchange between the two brothers to make the point that Carver is a hero while being a firefighter. Kidd drops the news in front of Nathan that both herself and Sam are receiving the Firefighter Award of Valor for saving Detective Pryma and it is something that every firefighter should be proud of.

=== Lyla Novak ===
Lyla Novak
- Chicago Fire character
- First appearance: "Something About Her" (12.09)
- Created by: Matt Olmstead
- Portrayed by: Jocelyn Hudon

In-universe information
- Nicknames: Lizzy; Novak
- Gender: Female
- Occupation: Paramedic
- Family: Unnamed father (deceased); Unnamed mother (deceased); Will Novak (brother); Heidi Novak (sister)
- Significant other: Scott Osbourne (former fiancé)
- Nationality: American

Career
- Department: Chicago Fire Department; Lakeview Fire Department (formerly)
- Rank: Paramedic (seasons 12 – present)

Portrayed by Jocelyn Hudon

Paramedic Lyla Novak (season 13 – present; recurring season 12) joins Ambulance 61 following Sylvie Brett's departure.

She was reassigned from Lakeview to Ambulance 61 after Boden booted Jared Lennox. She revealed a situation where she hooked up with her instructor and faced the ire of his wife.

=== Dom Pascal ===
Dom Pascal
- Chicago Fire character
- First appearance: "A Monster in the Field" (13.01)
- Created by: Matt Olmstead
- Portrayed by: Dermot Mulroney

In-universe information
- Full name: Dominic Pascal
- Nickname: Dom
- Gender: Male
- Occupation: CFD Firefighter
- Spouse: Monica Pascal (m. 2010; died 2025)
- Relatives: Olivia (sister-in-law)
- Nationality: American

Career
- Department: Phoenix Fire Department Chicago Fire Department (formerly): Battalion Chief 25 (formerly); Miami Fire-Rescue Department (formerly)
- Years of service: 1997–present
- Rank: Chief

Portrayed by Dermot Mulroney

Chief Dom Pascal (season 13 – present) joins Firehouse 51 following the promotion of Wallace Boden.

Dom Pascal began his career with the CFD but spent the last decade as a chief in Miami. Characterized as a cheerful person who works well under pressure, and whose leadership style differs from Boden's.

=== Sal Vasquez ===
Sal Vasquez
- Chicago Fire character
- First appearance: "Kicking Down Doors" (14.01)
- Created by: Matt Olmstead
- Portrayed by: Brandon Larracuente

In-universe information
- Full name: Salvador Vasquez
- Nickname: Sal
- Gender: Male
- Occupation: CFD Firefighter; Police officer (formerly)
- Family: Ramon Vasquez (father)
- Nationality: American

Career
- Department: Chicago Fire Department: Truck 81; Chicago Police Department (formerly)
- Rank: Firefighter

Portrayed by Brandon Larracuente

Sal Vasquez (season 14 – present) joins Firehouse 51 following Sam Carver's departure.

=== Hallie Thomas ===
Hallie Thomas
- First appearance: Pilot (episode 1.01)
- Last appearance: Leaders Lead (episode 1.22)
- Portrayed by: Teri Reeves

In-universe information
- Nickname: Hal
- Gender: Female
- Occupation: Physician, Lakeshore Hospital
- Family: Vivian Thomas (sister); Unnamed niece Unnamed nephew
- Significant other: Matthew Casey (former fiancé)
- Nationality: American
- Date of death: May 8, 2013
- Status: Deceased

Portrayed by Teri Reeves

Dr. Hallie Thomas (season 1) is a resident at Lakeshore Hospital and Casey's former fiancée. In the pilot episode, the two break up, but reconcile soon after. Their relationship becomes strained when Hallie reveals that she does not want to have children and she leaves Casey. When she returns, the two mend their relationship. After reuniting with Matt, the clinic she worked in is set ablaze. Hallie is trapped in the drug lockup but was rescued by Casey. After being pulled from the blaze, she is transported with CPR in progress to Lakeshore Hospital, where she is pronounced dead.

=== Leslie Shay ===
Leslie Shay
- Chicago Fire character
- First appearance: Chicago Fire: Pilot (episode 1.01)
- Last appearance: Chicago Fire: Always (episode 3.01)
- Created by: Matt Olmstead
- Portrayed by: Lauren German

In-universe information
- Full name: Leslie Elizabeth Shay
- Nicknames: Les; Shay
- Gender: Female
- Family: Megan Shay (sister)
- Significant others: Clarice Carthage (ex-girlfriend); Devon (ex-girlfriend); Corrine (ex-girlfriend)
- Relatives: Kenny James Herrmann (godson)
- Nationality: American
- Date of birth: 1978
- Date of death: May 13, 2014
- Status: Deceased

Career
- Department: Chicago Fire Department: Ambulance 61
- Years of service: 2008–2014
- Rank: Paramedic
- Badge No.: 6827

Portrayed by Lauren German

Paramedic Leslie Shay (seasons 1–3) is Gabby Dawson's partner at Ambulance 61 and the designated driver. An experienced paramedic, she is well-liked by the mostly male crew of 51 and frequently seen joking and horseplaying with them in the lounge during downtime. She and Kelly Severide share an apartment as roommates and are best friends. Shay is openly gay, often cracking self-deprecating jokes about it, and entangled in a relationship with her ex-lover Clarice, who was most recently married to and impregnated by a man. She is fiercely loyal to her friends, particularly to Kelly, whom she has risked her job for several times. Toward the end of season 1 and the beginning of season 2, she tries to have a baby through artificial insemination with Kelly, but the process fails. She is also close with Dawson, but a rift comes between them when Dawson fails to be there for her during her downward spiral of guilt over a man's suicide. She then gets mixed up with a girl she meets, Devon, whom she really likes, but that all ends when Devon robs Shay and her roommates, Severide and Otis. Shay disappears, and Severide tries to look for her. He asks for Dawson's help, and when Dawson finds her, they rekindle their friendship, and Shay goes back to Firehouse 51. An accident in the cliff-hanger season finale of season two leaves Shay critically injured in the explosion of a building, and she dies in the third-season premiere, "Always". Her death affects the entire firehouse since she was popular with everyone and well-liked by the mostly male crew. The subsequent investigation and Severide's own observations reveal that Shay had been murdered. Chicago PD detectives later link the fire with a string of unsolved arson cases dating back several decades. The investigation proves that the arsonist and murderer of Shay is Trenton Lamont under the aliases of Adrian Gish and Ross McGowan. Shay is avenged for good when Lamont is later shot and killed by Chicago PD detective Antonio Dawson.

=== Peter Mills ===
Peter Mills
- First appearance: Pilot (episode 1.01)
- Last appearance: "You Know Where to Find Me" (episode 3.20)
- Portrayed by: Charlie Barnett

In-universe information
- Nickname: Pete
- Family: Henry Mills (father; deceased); Ingrid Mills (mother); Elise Mills (sister); Leonard Mills (grandfather; deceased)

Career
- Department: Chicago Fire Department: Squad 3/Ambulance 61 (S2–3); Truck 81 (S1–2)
- Years of service: 2012–2015
- Rank: Firefighter (S1–3); Paramedic/PIC (S2)

Portrayed by Charlie Barnett

Firefighter/Paramedic Peter Mills (seasons 1–3) is introduced as the Firefighter Candidate at Truck 81. Following in the footsteps of his father, Peter aspires to join the Rescue Squad. His father served with Chief Boden and Lieutenant Severide's father Benny. Just minutes after arriving at the firehouse, he quickly finds himself caught in the middle of a spat between the firehouse's two Lieutenants, who have been at odds with one another since Darden's death a month earlier. As the new Candidate of Truck 81, he is pranked by his more senior counterparts and referred to by his whole name instead of his last name as per custom. At the end of season 1, he picks up an application for the Chicago Police Department because he does not get promoted to squad and to avoid Chief Boden. However, Mills later gets rewarded with a promotion to Squad 3. After badly injuring his leg in the season two finale Mills is put off work for six weeks but returns after four weeks in the season three premiere. After revealing to Lt. Severide that he gets dizzy whenever he isn't up right, Severide tells him to see a doctor. The doctor tells him that he can no longer be a firefighter. This all happens after Dawson is named to be a candidate on Truck 81, so because Mills has EMT training, he applies to replace Dawson as PIC and gets the job and now works with paramedic Sylvie Brett. In season 3, he stated his desire to return to Squad 3, only to find that Severide had already filled the vacancy left by Newhouse. In late season 2, he asks Newhouse, one of Severide's men in Squad 3 who moonlights as a private investigator, to track down his father's side of the family as he wanted to know why his mother had forbidden him to talk about his paternal relatives or contact them all these years.

Mills begins dating Gabriela Dawson in secret, later breaking up with her because she keeps the knowledge of an affair between his mother and Chief Boden from him. He tells Dawson that he would be willing to start over with her if she can tell him for sure that she does not have feelings for Casey, but she cannot, and the two officially end their relationship. He later dates Isabella, a friend of Dawson's, and their relationship takes various turns: First they meet, and she takes him to a formal event with Senator Wheeler and reveals her future ambitions; they feud because he feels used since his feelings of insecurity take over. Later they get over the feud and grow closer, Finally when the firehouse is in severe danger of closing he asks her for help to save 51 and they work together.

His sister Elise and mother ran a family restaurant following his father's death and Mills quickly earns the favor of his colleagues at the firehouse for his cooking skills. After Mills is promoted from Candidate status, the men have a hard time finding a replacement, with Otis and Cruz both trying but failing miserably.

In season 3, Mills' family is notified that his paternal grandfather has left them a restaurant in Wilmington, North Carolina. As their family restaurant had been burned in the previous season, his mother and sister jumped at the chance but Mills was reluctant to leave as he just returned to duty with the rescue squad. He finally decides to move with his family.

== Recurring characters ==
| Name | Portrayed by | Seasons | | | | | | | | | | | | |
| Name | Portrayed by | 1 | 2 | 3 | 4 | 5 | 6 | 7 | 8 | 9 | 10 | 11 | 12 | 13 |
|---|---|---|---|---|---|---|---|---|---|---|---|---|---|---|
| Harold Capp | Randy Flager | Recurring | | | | | | | | | | | | |
| Tony Ferraris | Anthony Ferraris | Recurring | | | | | | | | | | | | |
| Kevin Hadley | William Smillie | Recurring | | Guest | | | | | | | | | | |
| Jose Varges | Mo Gallini | Recurring | | Guest | | | | | | | | | | |
| Connie | DuShon Monique Brown | Recurring | | | | | | | | | | | | |
| Cindy Hermann | Robyn Coffin | Recurring | | | | | | | | Guest | Recurring | | | Guest |
| Heather Darden | Chaon Cross | Recurring | | | | | | | | | | | | |
| Benjamin "Benny" Severide | Treat Williams | Recurring | | | Guest | | Guest | Guest | Guest | Guest | | | | |
| Elise Mills | Alexandra Metz | Recurring | Guest | Guest | | | | | | | | | | |
| Ingrid Mills | Linda Powell | Recurring | Guest | | | | | | | | | | | |
| Leon Cruz | Jeff Lima | Recurring | Guest | | | | Guest | Guest | Guest | | | | | Guest |
| Renee Royce | Sarah Shahi | Recurring | Guest | | | | Recurring | | | | | | | |
| Clarice Carthage | Shiri Appleby | Recurring | | | | | | | | | | | | |
| Christie Casey Jordan | Nicole Forester | Recurring | | Guest | | | | | | | Guest | | | |
| Nancy Casey | Kathleen Quinlan | Recurring | | | | | | | | | | | | |
| Ernie | Cody Sullivan | Recurring | | | | | | | | | | | | |
| Griffin Darden | Griffin Kane (Season 1) John Babbo (Season 2) Cameron Scott Roberts (Season 10 – present) | Guest | Recurring | | | | | | | | Recurring | | Guest | |
| Ben Darden | Charlie Babbo (Season 2) Liam Booth (Season 10) | Guest | Recurring | | | | | | | | | | Guest | |
| Eric Whaley | Shane McRae | Recurring | | | | | | | | | | | | |
| Jeff Clarke | Jeff Hephner | | Recurring | | | Recurring | | | | | | | | |
| Gail McLeod | Michelle Forbes | | Recurring | | | | | | | | | | | |
| Spellman | John Hoogenakker | | Recurring | | | | | | | | | | | |
| Devon | Vedette Lim | | Recurring | | | | | | | | | | | |
| Lisa Clarke | Victoria Blade | | Recurring | | | | | | | | | | | |
| Donna Boden | Melissa Ponzio | | Recurring | | | | | Guest | Guest | Guest | | | Guest | |
| Allen Chout | Alex Weisman | | Recurring | | Guest | Guest | | | | | | | | |
| Katie Nolan | Brittany Curran | | Recurring | | | | | Guest | | | | | | |
| Rebecca Jones | Daisy Betts | | Recurring | | | | | | | | | | | |
| Tom Van Meter | Tim Hopper | | Guest | | | | Guest | Guest | Recurring | Guest | Recurring | | | |
| Allison Rafferty | Christine Evangelista | | Recurring | | | | | | | | | | | |
| Rick Newhouse | Edwin Hodge | | Guest | Recurring | | | | | | | | | | |
| Scott Rice | Warren Christie | | | Recurring | | | | | | | | | | |
| Tommy Welch | Kenny Johnson | | Guest | Recurring | | | | | | | | | | |
| Brittany Baker | Serinda Swan | | | Recurring | | | | | | | | | | |
| Wallace Boden Sr | Richard Roundtree | | | Recurring | | | | | | | | | | |
| Jack Nesbitt | Eric Mabius | | Recurring | Guest | | | | | | | | | | |
| Katya | Izabella Miko | | Recurring | Guest | | | | | | | | | | |
| Chaplin Orlovsky | Gordon Clapp | | Guest | Recurring | Guest | Guest | Guest | Guest | | | | | | |
| Dallas Patterson | Brian White | | | | Recurring | | | | | | | | | |
| Bianca Holloway | Jenny Mollen | | | | Recurring | | | | | | | | | |
| Tamara Jones | Holly Robinson Peete | | | | Recurring | | | | | | | | | |
| Susan Weller | Lauren Stamile | | | | Recurring | Guest | | | | | | | | |
| Grant Smith | Guy Burnet | | | | Recurring | Guest | | | | | | | | |
| Louis Thompson | Aiden & Austin Cohen | | | | Recurring | | | | | | | | | |
| Tina Cantrell | Deanna Reed-Foster | | | | Recurring | | Guest | | | | | | | |
| Jamie Killian | Rachel Nichols | | | | Recurring | | | | | | | | | |
| Ray Riddle | Fredric Lehne | | | | Recurring | | | | | | | | | |
| Ryan Wheeler | Tom Amandes | | | | Recurring | | | | | | | | | |
| Serena Holmes | Ilfenesh Hadera | | | | Recurring | | | | | | | | | |
| Roger Maddox | Mark Hengst | | | | Recurring | | | | | | | | | |
| Freddie Clemente | Ralph Rodriguez | | | | Recurring | | | | | | | | | |
| Athena Bailey-Johnson | Susannah Flood | | | | Recurring | | | | | | | | | |
| Danny Borelli | Andy Ahrens | | | | Recurring | | | | | | | | | |
| Jason Kannell | Kamal Angelo Bolden | | | | | Recurring | | | | | | | | |
| Ramón Dawson | Daniel Zacapa | | | | | Recurring | | | | | | | | |
| Anna Turner | Charlotte Sullivan | | | | | Recurring | | | | | | | | |
| Dennis Mack | Nick Boraine | | | | | Recurring | | | | | | | | |
| Travis Brenner | Scott Elrod | | | | | Recurring | | | | | | | | |
| Marcy Prescott | Mia Hulen | | | | | Recurring | | | | | | | | |
| Jake Cordova | Damon Dayoub | | | | | | Recurring | | | | | | | |
| Zach Torbett | Daniel Di Tomasso | | | | | | Recurring | | | | | | | |
| Carl Grissom | Gary Cole | | | | | | Recurring | | Guest | | | | | |
| Hope Jacquinot | Eloise Mumford | | | | | | Recurring | | Guest | | | | | |
| Bria Jameson | Quinn Cooke | | | | | | Recurring | | | | | | | |
| Chloe Cruz | Kristen Gutoskie | | | | | | | Recurring | | Guest | Recurring | Guest | Guest | |
| Jerry Gorsch | Steven Boyer | | | | | | | Recurring | Guest | | | | | |
| Kyle Sheffield | Teddy Sears | | | | | | | Recurring | Guest | | | Guest | | |
| Naomi Graham | Kate Villanova | | | | | | | Recurring | | | | | | |
| Jim Shaw | Kate Villanova | | | | | | | Recurring | | | | | | |
| Wendy Seager | Andy Allo | | | | | | | | Recurring | | Recurring | Guest | | |
| Greg Grainger | Jon-Michael Ecker | | | | | | | | | Recurring | | | | |
| Kylie Estevez | Katelynn Shennett | | | | | | | | Guest | Recurring | | | | |
| Evan Hawkins | Jimmy Nicholas | | | | | | | | | | Recurring | | | |
| Jason Pelham | Brett Dalton | | | | | | | | | | Recurring | | | |
| Emma Jacobs | Caitlin Carver | | | | | | | | | | Recurring | | | |
| Mason Locke | Chris Mansa | | | | | | | | | Guest | Recurring | | | |
| Javier Cruz | Carlos S. Sanchez | | | | | | | | | | Recurring | | Guest | Guest |
| Derrick Gibson | Rome Flynn | | | | | | | | | | | | Recurring | |
| Danya Robinson | Laura Allen | | | | | | | | | | | | Recurring | |
| Jack Damon | Michael Bradway | | | | | | | | | | | | Recurring | |
| Monica Pascal | KaDee Strickland | | | | | | | | | | | | | Recurring |
| Tori | Holly Hinchliffe | | | | | | | | | | | | | Recurring |

=== Firefighters and paramedics ===
- Jose Vargas (Mo Gallini) is a former firefighter at 51. A sixteen-year veteran of the CFD, Vargas recently transferred from Truck 81 in the episode "Professional Courtesy" to Squad 3. Initially, Severide questions if his motivation was due to monetary benefits and a potential promotion but Vargas proves to be one of his most reliable men. He is forced to retire after he suffers serious injuries to his lungs in a warehouse fire and considers suicide by jumping from his apartment building rooftop, but Severide and Casey talk him out of it. At the beginning of season 3, he appears in a flashback on Shay's first day at Firehouse 51.
- Harold Capp (Randy Flagler) is a member of Squad 3. He is usually one of the less vocal firefighters at 51 and is particularly loyal to Severide. He and Tony are the only remaining men who have been with Severide in Squad 3 since the first season.
- Tony (Anthony Ferraris) is a member of Squad 3. Although his turnout coat has his last name, he is always addressed as "Tony" by Severide. Ferraris himself is a Chicago Fire Department firefighter and is one of several CFD current and retired firefighters involved in the show.
- Kevin Hadley (William Smillie) is a former member of Squad 3; he was transferred out of Squad 3 to another house because of an inappropriate prank on Peter Mills. In season 2 he targets Firehouse 51 and personally targets Severide for revenge with arson attacks and burns himself when pouring gas on himself and standing on top of an accelerant, leaving him badly scarred and in constant pain. He is currently in prison. He appears in a flashback on Shay's first day at Firehouse 51 in the season 3 premiere.
- Allen Chout (Alex Weisman) is a paramedic who was introduced in the season 2 episode "Rhymes with Shout", the episode title being a reference to how his last name is pronounced. He has also appeared on Chicago Med.
- Rick Newhouse (Edwin Hodge) transfers from the fictional Squad 6 based out of Firehouse 53 in the neighbourhood of South Side in the season 2 episode "One More Shot" to fill the empty spot left behind in Squad 3 after Clarke's promotion and subsequent transfer. His experience and charismatic personality quickly win over Severide and the rest of the men, although Herrmann initially antagonized him as he had yet to come to terms with the recent suicide of Candidate Rebecca Jones. When off duty, he moonlights as a skiptracer and has been seen entertaining his coworkers with stories of his "clientele". Mills looks up to him as an older brother figure. He hails from the crime-ridden Chicago area of Roseland and, despite getting out, still goes back to visit family. He is a single father with an elementary school-age daughter Naomi. In season 3, he leaves Chicago to visit family in Miami and Scott Rice takes over his spot on Squad 3 on a temporary basis. Whether or not Newhouse will return remains ambiguous.
- Pouch the dog: Peter is given a dog by a child from a family who could not take care of it. Hermann, Chief Boden, and Mouch decide against it. Eventually, the three agree after Hermann suggests the three should rethink the dog. She is given a name and adopted by the team. Pouch's name was decided by Hermann, who suggests she should be named after Mouch, which is half man, half couch, to Pouch: half pooch, half couch. Mouch was initially against them adopting Pouch because of a bad experience he had with the dog at his former firehouse but comes to enjoy Pouch's company. The two are often seen on the couch together. In the episode "The Last One for Mom", Pouch bonds with Detective Holloway's son JJ, who Kelly is watching over while she is working an undercover assignment. After Holloway is killed, the team decides to let Pouch go with JJ when he leaves the firehouse with his aunt.
- Firefighter Candidate Rebecca Jones (Daisy Betts) was a Candidate assigned to Truck 81 and the only daughter of Deputy District Chief Lionel Jones. She and Gabby Dawson were the only women in their cohort at the fire academy. Dawson catches her cheating in the theory test but decides not to say anything after Jones reveals the real reason why she wanted to become a firefighter. The men of Truck 81 are unsettled upon finding out that she was their new candidate. She turns against Dawson after being told to clean the toilets by Herrmann, backed up by Lieutenant Casey, both of whom already had reputations for being hard on candidates, since she thought that Casey and Dawson were colluding against her. After she begins to settle into a better relationship with the people of 51, her father orders Boden and Casey to provide a pretext to end her candidacy so he can transfer her to a safer position at headquarters. Boden and Casey plan to resist the order, but upon Dawson's telling her about her father's plot, Rebecca spirals into depression and takes her own life.
- Lieutenant Jeff Clarke (Jeff Hephner) is a former member of Squad 3. After his firehouse is closed, he is transferred to Firehouse 51, Squad 3. He is initially not liked by the rest of the crew since he is extremely private and prefers to read newspapers at the squad's table rather than socialize with them in the lounge. Additionally, his arrival at Firehouse 51 coincides with McLeod's efforts to find reasons to close it down, and he is falsely accused of being McLeod's mole. When the rest of the firehouse realizes that he had actually turned McLeod down, they befriend him and help him through his marital problems. He is also revealed to be a former Marine and Iraq veteran. His wife Lisa had cheated on him while he was on his final tour, and they are estranged when the character is first introduced. They reconnect after she asks for his forgiveness and he and the crew are nearly killed by a burning propane tanker on a call. Lisa's ex-lover Hayes turns out to be a loanshark who continuously harasses them to the point where Clarke is prepared to kill the man with his military-issue sniper rifle. When Hayes is found dead, Clarke becomes the prime suspect and tries to protect Lisa upon finding out that she had been involved. The detective in charge of his case, Jay Halstead, sympathizes with him (it is revealed in Chicago P.D. that Jay is also a military veteran) after Clarke explains that he had to protect Lisa since she was the only one who was there for him when he returned from his tour of duty suffering from PTSD. He transfers out of 51 after being promoted to lieutenant and is now the commander of Truck 25. His last appearance was in the episode "A Heavy Weight", when he drops by 51 to check up on his friends after Rebecca Jones' suicide. After his promotion, he hurts himself on the job and returns to med school and is now a Resident at Chicago Medical Center, thus becoming a recurring character on Chicago Med. He also reveals that he and Lisa eventually divorced.
- Lieutenant Spellman (John Hoogenakker) is introduced as a transfer to Firehouse 51, along with Clarke, after city budget cuts force downsizing in the CFD. He is later revealed to be the snitch to Gail McLeod and is "transferred" out of 51. Mills realizes that he was McLeod's "spy", and Spellman is quickly transferred out after the entire crew, Lieutenants Casey and Severide and Chief Boden included, stage a "rebellion" by handing him pink transfer forms and taping his locker with pink forms.
- Chaplain William Orlovsky (Gordon Clapp) is a CFD chaplain and long-time colleague of Boden. There was some tension between him and Boden due to unresolved issues from the past, but they put it behind them after Orlovsky explains what happened. He runs a boys' hockey team, which Herrmann's son Luke is part of. It was revealed in "Ambush Predator", that he had come up with Bobby Hull, but turned down an offer from the Blackhawks to become ordained. Boden would send his firefighters to the chaplain for counselling, especially after a traumatic experience.
- Paramedic in Charge Allison Rafferty (Christine Evangelista) joins Ambulance 61 as Leslie Shay's new partner and Dawson's replacement after the latter begins training at the fire academy. At first, Rafferty seems distant toward Shay, and when Shay later confronts her, she tells her that her previous partner at 24 was a lesbian and used to make "graphic" phone calls to her girlfriend that made Rafferty uncomfortable. In her second episode appearance, it is revealed she was a resident doctor at Chicago Med but dropped out when her fiancé developed Hodgkin's lymphoma; he died six months later. She is suspended for treating a patient who refused treatment, and Dawson regains her spot on Ambulance 61. She is the PIC for Ambulance 61 on first shift.
- Erik McAuley (David Pasquesi) is a paramedic who has appeared in several episodes on relief duty. He is known for his sarcasm and pessimism and was described by the crew at 51 as "the worst Mr. Doom and Gloom" and "Eeyore".
- Scott Rice (Warren Christie) is a former firefighter with 114 who rejoins the CFD and fills in the empty spot in Squad 3 vacated by Mills, who was out with an injury. He is widowed with a young son named Logan. Severide had recommended him and his arrival was met with suspicion, particularly by Otis. According to Otis, there were rumors going around about Rice shirking his duty or losing his concentration at critical moments. He pulls out of a fire on a call, claiming that his SCBA mask malfunctioned. Otis is suspicious as Rice had previously left a fire claiming he didn't have his Denver bar, but no one initially believes him. It is only when Cruz tests Rice's SCBA mask that he now starts to believe Otis. Otis then accuses Rice of being a ducker, causing Severide to throw a punch at him while off duty at Molly's. Tensions continue to rise between Truck 81 and Squad 3 when members of 81 sit at the table on the apparatus floor that Squad usually sits at. Rice is kicked off of Squad and out of 51 in "Spartacus" when Severide finds that Rice had never sent his SCBA mask in for repair and Rice reveals that he did duck dangerous calls in fear of orphaning his son. He is replaced by Cruz because the latter had just received his squad certification.
- Captain/later Battalion Chief Dallas Patterson (Brian J. White) was assigned by Chief Riddle to oversee Squad 3 during Severide's temporary demotion in the season 4 premiere. Severide tries to hide the fact that he resents Patterson, who attempts to win over the men of Squad 3 by taking the tab or buying pizza for them. He is given the promotion from Captain to Chief during Boden's legal troubles, much to everyone's dismay. It is later revealed that Patterson had actually been waiting for an opportunity to trap the much despised Chief Riddle and force him into retirement.
- Lieutenant Wendy Seager (Andy Allo) is a lieutenant in the Office of Fire Investigation (OFI). She initially attempts to recruit Severide to join her at OFI to help clear backlogged cases, which he initially declines. Severide is then assigned to OFI by Commissioner Grissom, and Severide accepts on the condition that Herrmann is cleared of misconduct charges. She and Severide proceed to clear cases until he returns to his command of Squad 3. She returns in "Protect a Child" when Kidd is trying to create a program to recruit female teenagers from public schools to become junior firefighters and Kidd needs a female officer in order to get the program started. She has expressed her romantic interest in Severide on several occasions.

=== Family members and significant others ===
- Nancy Annalyn Casey (Kathleen Quinlan) is the mother of Matthew and Christie Casey. She was incarcerated for murdering their verbally abusive father and her husband Gregory in 1997, fifteen years prior to the beginning of the series. She had grown estranged from her children while in prison; it was mentioned that Christie still could not forgive her and would testify against her at each parole hearing, thereby postponing Nancy's release, while Casey only visited on rare occasions. Casey is successful in getting Nancy released on parole after convincing Christie to let go of the past. Nancy stays with her son as part of her parole, but things become tense between mother and son when Casey voices his discomfort over her going out with "a penpal" just hours after being released. She moves in with her former cellmate but not before telling her children to mend their relationship. Prior to the character's introduction, Casey almost never mentioned any family members. Only Dawson knew about his having to testify at Nancy's parole hearing while his two most senior firefighters, Herrmann and Mouch, both mentioned that Casey's family was a taboo topic. When Nancy came to visit him at the firehouse, he was visibly uncomfortable with her presence.
- Renee Royce (Sarah Shahi) is the ex-girlfriend of Lieutenant Kelly Severide. Renee becomes attracted to Kelly after he saves her in a traffic accident, and they begin dating. In the season 1 finale, she announced that she is pregnant with Kelly Severide's child. In season 2, it is revealed that the baby is not Severide's.
- Benjamin "Benny" Severide (Treat Williams) is Kelly's father and a retired Battalion Chief of Battalion 22, who served with Chief Wallace Boden and Peter Mills' father Henry Mills. He is a skilled arson investigator with the CFD's Office of Fire Investigation Division (OFI). The elder Severide seems well known within the CFD, with various characters, mainly the "white shirts" (high-ranking officers), referring to Kelly as Benny's son. In season 2, Gail McLeod plots a way to overthrow Chief Boden and recruits Benny to see if he will command 51. He accepts but then he backs out because of his longstanding friendship with Wallace. He and Chief Boden had fallen out after the death of Henry Mills in the line of duty to the point where they even argued in front of Boden's men at the firehouse but both have been able to set aside their differences when needed. Benny had a love-hate relationship with his son as he had left Kelly and his mother when the latter was ten years old and had Katie, Kelly's half-sister, with another woman before abandoning them too. He lived in Kenosha, Wisconsin with his new wife Beth and two sons but abandoned them and moved to Chicago without Kelly's knowledge. Kelly only finds out when Beth personally introduces herself to him and asks him to tell Benny to come home for the boys' sakes. He ultimately sees the error of his actions after Kelly scolds him for his repeated abandonments. He goes back to Beth after telling Kelly to connect with Katie. In season 2, he was implied to be responsible for the disappearance of Vince Keeler, the mobster behind his daughter Katie's kidnapping, and confesses to Sergeant Voight in a bar. Voight, being a father himself, lets Benny off and Benny returns to Kenosha on his advice. He makes recurring appearances in later seasons. He ultimately dies in Season 7 of a stroke. Years later Severide discovered that Benny fathered another son Jack Damon.
- Cindy Herrmann (Robyn Coffin) is married to Christopher Herrmann, and mother of their five children (4 boys and 1 girl). In the episode "Under the Knife" Herrmann announces that Cindy is pregnant with their fifth child. In "Ambition" she has a medical episode as a result of the pregnancy and passes out and is rushed to the hospital. In "Hell of a Ride" she has a baby boy. As she is Catholic and does not use birth control because of religious restrictions, Herrmann surprises her on their twentieth anniversary by getting a vasectomy.
- Elise Mills (Alexandra Metz) is Peter Mills' sister. She helps run the family restaurant with her mom and is torn between being protective of Peter and encouraging him to follow his passion for public service.
- Katie Nolan (Brittany Curran) is Kelly Severide's half-sister, and Benny Severide's daughter. Kelly and Katie didn't know each other until they meet in the restaurant where Katie works as a chef. She initially did not trust Kelly, but he assured her that he was nothing like their father. After bonding, the pair accept each other as family. Katie briefly dated Otis while bonding with Kelly. She was kidnapped after "the blackout" by Vince Keeler, though is rescued by her brother but is badly injured. When her father learned this, he is implied to have had a role in Keeler's disappearance. Katie later moves to Colorado for a fresh start. She makes a brief return in season seven after her father died of a stroke.
- Clarice Carthage (Shiri Appleby) is introduced as the pregnant ex-girlfriend of Leslie Shay. In season 1, episode 13, Shay and Clarice reconcile their relationship, and Clarice moves back in with Shay, only for Clarice to break up with Shay for a second time at the end of season 1, episode 16.
- Donna Robbins (Melissa Ponzio) is married to Wallace Boden. A schoolteacher, she is introduced as a citizen Boden helps deal with her neglectful landlord, and in return she gives him a cooked dish. They initially broke up after Boden was fearful he'd screw up the relationship based on his relationship history. She later reveals that she is pregnant, and Boden proposes unromantically. He later proposes to her in front of her students in his dress blues, citing his love for her, and she accepts. They get married in the season 2 finale in front of Firehouse 51, with Peter Mills serving as the clergyman and Herrmann as Boden's best man. She gives birth to their son Terence in "Santa Bites" in the back of Squad 3 while en route to the hospital.
- Lily (Ariane Rinehart) was Otis's girlfriend introduced in season 6, episode 6 "Down Is Better". She is introduced as the owner of a bar near Otis' apartment that was closing and was later bought by Herrmann, Otis, and Dawson and rebranded Molly's North. After Otis' death, it's revealed that Lily did not feel like running Molly's North and closed down. She returned in "The Tendency of a Drowning Victim" with an investment opportunity for Herrmann.
- Chloe Allen (Kristen Gutoskie) is married to Joe Cruz. She is the head of research at a consulting company and has a degree in library science. They met in "Going to War", where he rescues her during the tower fire. She shows up at the firehouse in "Thirty Percent Sleight of Hand" to give Cruz and the firehouse cake pops, showing signs of attraction to Cruz. Cruz is initially unsure of whether she is just being nice or flirtatious with him, until he goes to her office to ask her out. She accepts immediately, with the entirety of her office watching. She suffers serious injuries in a car crash in "Always a Catch", and later recovers. Cruz discloses his intention to propose to her in "Infection", but she breaks up with him before he gets the chance to do so. In "Buckle Up", she reveals to Brett that she broke up with him out of fear that she would lose him like Lily did with Otis. Brett convinces her to give Cruz a second chance, and she later accepts his proposal outside of his apartment. They get married in the season 8 episode "Light Things Up". In Season 10, Chloe gives birth to a son, Brian "Otis" Leon Cruz, in honor of his late best friend and brother. They later adopt a young boy named Javier, who Cruz saved on a call.

=== Other ===
- Gail McLeod (Michelle Forbes) is a financial consultant hired by the state to help trim the budget of the CFD which includes closing some firehouses. She had Lieutenant Spellman, a transfer from a closed firehouse, "report" to her on the activities of the crew at 51, but Spellman was coerced into transferring out when the entire crew, led by Lieutenants Casey and Severide, staged a plan to run him out upon discovering that he was the mole. Mouch rallies the union to fight back when he discovers the reason why McLeod was so keen on closing down firehouses. The community and fellow firefighters rally behind 51, drawing the attention of State Senator Wheeler, who orders his assistant Isabella, then-girlfriend of Peter Mills, to reverse the closure of 51. When McLeod protests, Isabella threatens to have her $200,000 bribe regarding her actions exposed to the press, and crucify her with having her credentials blacklisted permanently so she won't, as Isabella put it, "get a government contract as a meter maid!" McLeod surrenders and signs the paperwork, but Isabella then tells her she is now persona non grata in Chicago and to never return.
- Connie (DuShon Monique Brown) is Boden's secretary. She is feared by the other firefighters for her no-nonsense attitude and acerbic wit. Mouch notably had "his couch" confiscated when he tried to push his union paperwork to her and only got it back after apologizing to her twice. Boden once quipped that his "entire relationship with Connie is based on asking her for as little as possible." Nonetheless, Connie has been known to be extremely protective of Chief Boden and Firehouse 51. She is implied to have been the one to file a complaint against Firefighter Candidate Rebecca Jones for her sexual innuendo-laced prank on Herrmann as she has repeatedly made known her dislike of Jones. She is well known for her inability to keep secrets. Executive producer Derek Haas commented that Brown's unexpected death towards the end of Season 6 posed a unique challenge for the writing team and they chose not to immediately address the character's absence in latter half of the season. In the season 7 premiere, during the firehouse meeting, Boden tells the team that Connie had completed her master's degree in counseling and left the CFD to fulfill her dream of becoming a counsellor.
- Jack Nesbitt (Eric Mabius) is a former firefighter who started a nightclub-cum-strip club called "Stilettos" and initially appeared to be a success story of a firefighter smoothly transitioning into civilian life. He contacts Casey, an old acquaintance, to do renovation work for the club. Casey begins to suspect something is going on after seeing some foreign-looking men in Nesbitt's office and Nesbitt attempts to get him to join as a "business associate". Detective Voight then alerts Casey that the CPD has been suspecting Nesbitt for human trafficking but were unable to nail him with solid evidence. One of the strippers, Katya, later tells Casey that she has collected information on the trafficking ring operating out of Stilettos, confirming Voight's suspicion. It is revealed that Nesbitt was actually a double agent; he was colluding with Bulgarian criminals and profiting from the trafficking ring while feeding the FBI information about the Bulgarians' criminal activities. He is eventually arrested by Voight and the FBI.
- Katya L. Antov (Izabella Miko) was a 27-year-old Bulgarian immigrant working at a nightclub Casey was contracted to do renovation work for during the latter half of season 3. She had gathered information on a trafficking ring running out of the nightclub and went to Casey's apartment to ask for his help. Casey tells her that he was helping Detective Hank Voight in doing undercover surveillance to find evidence so the Chicago Police Department could shut down the trafficking ring. They were ambushed by Bulgarian criminals and she was shot execution-style in front of him. Her death would haunt Casey for the first several episodes of season 4.
- Tom Van Meter (Tim Hopper) is the captain in the Office of Fire Investigation. He is often seen working with Severide on a fire investigation within 51's district or a fire that affected someone at 51. In the season 14 episode "A Man Possessed", Van Meter was severely burned and put in a medically-induced coma after someone set the apartment of a school principal on fire while he and Severide were talking with the principal.
- Mike Doherty (Mike Doherty) is the driver of Engine 51. Although his character has very few lines, Doherty is often seen walking around the firehouse or being instructed to man the engine pump panel. Every so often, he will be heard acknowledging an order from the Lieutenant or getting a beer at Molly's
- Clarence Norwood (Clarence Norwood) is a firefighter on Engine 51. Similar to Doherty, he has very few lines and is often seen moving hoses and is someone that Herrmann is seen teasing. His most storyline was when he came down with MONO in season 8. This led to Mouch acting as his floater.

== Crossover characters ==
=== Chicago P.D. ===
- Detective Antonio Dawson (Jon Seda) is a Chicago Police Department detective assigned to District 21 and older brother of Gabriela "Gabby" Dawson. He is enlisted by Casey for help when Casey runs into trouble with the seemingly dirty CPD Detective Hank Voight. He is later almost killed in an undercover job gone bad, and joins District 21's Intelligence Unit run by the newly out of prison Hank Voight. Whenever a firefighter at Firehouse 51, where Gabby works, has a run-in with the CPD, Antonio is often called in due to his good relationship with Boden and the firefighters. He and his (ex)wife Laura have two children: Diego and Eva.
- Sergeant (previously Detective) Hank Voight (Jason Beghe) is a seemingly dirty cop who clashes with Lieutenant Matthew Casey (in the episode "Professional Courtesy") after Voight's son's drunk driving paralyzes a teen. Voight covers for his son and targets Casey when he refuses to back down. He was imprisoned for trying to have Casey murdered but has since been released and promoted to sergeant. He heads up the Intelligence Unit of Chicago P.D. and has since been working with Casey to track down the person or people involved with the death of his ex-fiancée. At the end of season 1 episode 23, it is shown that Voight is actually posing as a dirty cop in an undercover collaboration with Internal Affairs to smoke out criminals and other dirty cops. Due to his history with Casey, Voight is still largely despised or viewed with suspicion by the men at Firehouse 51. He does earn their grudging respect with his dedication to finding justice for victims. Voight stated on Chicago P.D. that he considers firefighters "one of our own" and has gone out of his way a number of times to help them and their family members when necessary. He returns to seek Casey's help in investigating a suspected human trafficking ring operating out of a nightclub at which Casey was doing renovation work for. In season 4, he personally arrests Jack Nesbitt, owner of the nightclub, as the latter was about to shoot Casey to cover his tracks.
- Detective Erin Lindsay (Sophia Bush) is a colleague of Antonio's and Voight's adopted daughter who previously dated Lieutenant Kelly Severide. She was one of the detectives assigned to investigate the kidnapping of Severide's half sister Katie. They break up by season 3 when Severide spirals out of control after the death of his best friend and co-worker Leslie Shay. With the premiere of Fire spin-off Chicago P.D., she has had an on-off relationship with her partner Detective Jay Halstead.
- Detective Jay Halstead (Jesse Lee Soffer) is a detective with the Intelligence Unit who was first introduced as an undercover cop. He was posing as "Jay", a regular customer at Molly's, and begins a relationship with Gabriela Dawson, sister of his colleague Antonio. She discovers he was a henchman of Arthur, a mobster who has been harassing Gabby and her fellow firefighters and joint owners at their bar, Molly's. Feeling betrayed, she dumps him and is about to call the police when Antonio reveals to her that "Jay" was actually his co-worker Detective Jay Halstead. Halstead eventually successfully takes down and arrests Arthur, but not before taking a bullet to his shoulder. He and Gabby mutually agree to part ways. In season 2, he appears again, this time to investigate whether Clarke, one of Severide's men, was involved in the murder of his wife's ex-lover.
- Officer Kim Burgess (Marina Squerciati) is an officer with the Intelligence Unit. She often stops by Firehouse 51 to deliver information to various firefighters and other personnel who have asked her to look into a particular person or incident under investigation.
- Desk Sergeant Trudy Platt (Amy Morton) is married to Mouch, one of the firefighters at 51. They first met at Chief Boden's wedding reception in the season 2 finale and began dating. She often dotes on him, much to the envy of his colleagues.
- Greg "Mouse" Gerwitch (Samuel Hunt) is the tech analyst at the 21st District. Lieutenant Severide asks for his help regarding a potential cover-up after some files on Gabby's computer were deleted.

=== Chicago Med ===
- Dr. Will Halstead (Nick Gehlfuss) is the brother of Detective Jay Halstead. He was previously a plastic surgeon based in New York City but returned home to Chicago where he is now an emergency medicine resident at the (fictional) Chicago Medical Center. He is one of two main characters from the spin-off Chicago Med who has been introduced to the franchise prior to the episode "I Am the Apocalypse", which served as a backdoor pilot for Med.
- April Sexton (Yaya DaCosta) is a nurse at Chicago Med and was first introduced in the episode "Forgive You Anything". She went to high school with Lieutenant Kelly Severide and is one of the few characters who knew Severide prior to him joining the CFD and of his background. Her family welcomed Kelly into their home when he was going through a troubled phase due to his dysfunctional family life.
- Dr. Daniel Charles (Oliver Platt) is a psychiatrist at Chicago Med. He counselled Brett when she found herself too attached to an infant she helped deliver during a call.
