= Nancy Goodman =

American author, screenwriter, and director

Nancy Goodman (born April 9, 1959) is an American author, screenwriter, and director.

== Early life ==
Born to parents Myra Wolfe and Leonard Kipnis, she was raised in Evanston, IL, graduated from Evanston Township High School in 1977, and was a Journalism major at Indiana University.

In addition to her work as an author and filmmaker, Goodman also created Wish Puppies, a plush dog with a Velcro opening in the belly to tuck a letter detailing a wish, plan, or goal; the plush animals are sold in Walgreens and online.

Goodman also developed and ran CoreKids LLC, a four-part health program for preschoolers, which focuses on themes of exercise, nutritional & emotional awareness, art projects, and giving back to the community.

Goodman has three children. She resides with her family in Highland Park, IL.

== Works ==
It Was Food Vs. Me and I Won (2004), tells the story of Goodman's own struggles with bingeing, and the surprising role feelings play in food cravings. In the book Goodman speaks directly to readers and shares her inspiring story and lessons for beating binge-eating.

Surprise Me! (Diversion Books 2012), explores the connection between food and feelings, especially emotional eating.

Surprise Me! feature film, is Goodman's debut directorial. It speaks out against emotional eating, eating disorders, obesity, childhood obesity, and the struggle to lose five or ten pounds.

== Awards ==
Goodman won first place in the "How to Finance Your Film/Pitch Contest" (Los Angeles 2014) for her screenplay, Surprise Me!

== Works ==
It Was Food Vs. Me and I Won : book

Surprise Me! : book, adapted into a movie
