= Stark (novel) =

1989 novel by Ben Elton

- First edition cover
- Author: Ben Elton
- Cover artist: David Scutt
- Language: English
- Genre: Dystopian fiction, ecofiction
- Publisher: Sphere Books
- Publication date: 1 January 1989
- Publication place: United Kingdom
- Media type: Print
- Pages: 496
- ISBN: 0-7474-0390-2
- Followed by: Gridlock (1991)

Stark is a 1989 novel by comedian Ben Elton. It was commercially and critically successful in the United Kingdom and Australia. It was Elton's first novel, and launched his writing career. Stark was reprinted 23 times in its first year, and ultimately sold well over a million copies, making Elton one of a small number of novelists to sell more than a million copies of their first book. The novel was adapted into Stark, a television miniseries.

It is a comedy with environmental themes. The comedy style has been compared with the literary works of Douglas Adams and Grant Naylor. It is set mainly in Australia, in a dystopian near-future, and the lead protagonist is an expat Englishman. The story is told from the point of view of a large number of characters, and the point of view often temporarily shifts to that of an animal. Much of the early plot takes place in Carlton, a fictional town south of Perth, Western Australia. Most of the rest of the novel takes place in Kalgoorkatta and Bullens Creek, in the Western Australian desert. The final scene takes place at an unspecified location in outer space, perhaps on the Moon.

== Themes ==
The novel is largely a satire of business, government and social attitudes toward environmentalism during the late 1980s. It describes a world in which big business and the ultra-rich are uncaring. It also skewers environmental activists as being unwilling to take decisive action, but willing to take actions that are self-destructive and ineffectual.

The book often deals with serious themes and then delivers comic relief. These comic diversions usually come to an abrupt end, often due to the hapless sudden death of a gag character. The comedy draws on Elton's typical fodder. The book contains crude and cringe humour, with characters who often experience flatulence and drunkenness, and running afoul of the law. The narrative also pokes fun at religion, place names and foreigners. The capricious and sometimes unjust nature of male-female relationships is a constant theme. Corporate and military culture are ridiculed. As in much of Elton's comic work, the central character is an unsuccessful, self-loathing, 'farty' skinny Englishman who has trouble relating to women. The book's prominent themes include:

- Air pollution
- The Campaign for Nuclear Disarmament
- Displacement of Indigenous Australians from their land
- Far right politics
- Finance
- Global warming
- Nuclear power
- Racism
- Recreational drug use
- Unrequited love
- Uranium mining
- White supremacy

== Synopsis ==
Colin "CD" Dobson lives a humdrum life at a critical point in history. The environment is being destroyed by a series of 'avalanches' – sudden upsets in the Earth's ecosystem, causing widespread destruction. The Stark conspiracy is a cabal of the world's richest and most influential men, who have long been aware that the planet's ecosystem is approaching total collapse. For decades, they have been launching uncrewed spacecraft loaded with supplies into orbit around the Earth and the Moon. Seeking to save their own lives and leave everyone else to suffer from 'total toxic overload', they secretly build a fleet of spacecraft with the intention of colonising the Moon.

Using crude intimidation, they purchase land from Aboriginal people in Western Australia to use as a launch site. They sell their stocks and commodities to raise cash, dumping the assets at the same time and in high volumes to engineer a worldwide stock market crash and lower the price of the resources they need. They buy the Moon from the United States government, along with the hardware to reach it.

Six vessels are designed to travel to the Moon, three of which will carry humans, with room for 250 humans in total. The vessels are named 'Star Arks', referencing the Biblical story of Noah's Ark. The Star Arks contain human and animal embryos in suspended animation, as well as resources needed for life support. The Star Arks are prepared under the cover story that the consortium is building a desert resort.

CD and his friends form a group called 'EcoAction'. Each of them has their own reason for fighting the consortium, with the collective goal of trying to protect the environment. They take action against the consortium's activities, and in the process uncover the conspiracy. They infiltrate the launch site and wreak havoc. CD and one of the conspirators, Sly Moorcock, compete for the affections of Rachel, who eventually joins the conspiracy as Sly's intended partner.

EcoAction try to warn the rest of the world about the plan, but they are not taken seriously. The cabal kill many of those who have investigated or uncovered the conspiracy. Rachel turns on Sly at the last minute so she can sabotage the launch, but he overpowers and tries to abduct her. She escapes and rejoins the surviving members of EcoAction. The Stark Conspiracy blast off, but find that their existence is frustrating and lonely. Sly Moorcock eventually commits suicide. The narrative ends with an admonishment for the world's consumers over their inaction on environmental issues in the late 1980s and early 1990s.

== Characters ==
The novel features a large number of characters, both human and animal. The main protagonists are an ensemble of humans who form the EcoAction team. The main antagonists are a small group who form the Stark Conspiracy. There are also numerous gag characters, who are introduced for the purposes of narrating a humorous tale, and then quickly discarded. These characters are often animals. For example, Dave the dolphin is born, and Iggy the iguana eats a fly, and all die very shortly afterwards. Most of the human characters are derided by the narrative for comedic effect and as a vehicle for social commentary.

The animal characters are usually anthropomorphised. The author gives them human names and describes their thoughts and point of view as though the animal were a sentient human. Animals are often portrayed as being more intelligent than humans. Their simple lifestyles are compared with those of humans, particularly to the extent which human consumption impacts the environment. Late in the story, a camel named Walter Culboon (named by a human character after two of the EcoAction characters who die) becomes integral to the infiltration of the Stark base.

=== Human characters ===
EcoAction:

- Colin "CD" Dobson, a British-born loser living in Australia. He frequently acts out of a desire to impress women, to obtain sex.
- Rachel Kelly, CD's love interest, who eventually partners with Sly Moorcock.
- Zimmerman, a former Army commando who lost his genitals during a firefight in the Vietnam War.
- Walter, an environmentalist and hippie who is close friends with Zimmerman.
- Johnny and Maud Culboon, Aborigines whose land becomes the site of the Stark Conspiracy.
- Christine 'Chrissy' Kelly (apparently no relation to Rachel), an American journalist who investigates the financial dealings of the conspiracy.

The Stark Conspiracy:

- Silvester "Sly" Moorcock, a businessman who is indoctrinated into the Stark Conspiracy.
- Tex Slampacker, an American fast food magnate.
- Ocker Tyron, an Australian businessman whose rivalry with Moorcock causes tension.
- Mr Nagasyu, a Japanese technology businessman.
- Professor Durf, an ecological scientist who heads the Domesday Group (the research arm of the Conspiracy).
- Aristos Tyron, Ocker's hanger-on brother.
- Gordon Gordon, a white power skinhead who intimidates the Indigenous people into giving up their land.

== Connections with other works ==
Elton wrote a screenplay based on this novel, which was subsequently made as Stark, a television miniseries. It was a joint production by the British and Australian national broadcasters (BBC and ABC). Ben Elton played the lead role, with Colin Friels as Sly and Jacqueline McKenzie as Rachel. There were some differences between the novel and the miniseries; some characters were renamed, and the ending was different. Elton's subsequent two novels, Gridlock and This Other Eden, also deal with environmental themes and are set in a dystopian future.
