= Bomphiologia =

Rhetorical technique

Bomphiologia, also known as verborum bombus, is a rhetorical technique wherein the speaker brags excessively.

== History ==
The term verborum bombus is used by the sixteenth-century English rhetorician Richard Sherry in his 1550 book A treatise of Schemes & Tropes. In it, Sherry says

Verborum bombus, when small & triflyng thynges are set out wyth great gasyng wordes. Example of this have you in Terrence of the boasting souldiar.

Sherry mentions the miles gloriosus character from the plays of the Roman playwright Plautus. The miles gloriosus (meaning "braggart soldier") is a stock character from a play by Plautus. The miles gloriosus was a soldier who, although a coward, bragged excessively about past experiences.

The most famous miles gloriosus in theatre is probably Shakespeare's Sir John Falstaff. Falstaff is a fat old knight in the service of the English king who brags about his battle experiences, despite being cowardly and averse to battle. In one scene, Falstaff says

I would to God my name were not so terrible to the enemy as it is. I were better to be eaten to death with a rust than to be scoured to nothing with perpetual motion (Henry IV, Part 2 1.2.218-221).

Falstaff here is lamenting the fact that because his name is so terrifying, enemies avoid fighting him. This is obviously bomphiologia on Falstaff's part.

== Uses ==
Bomphiologia can be used to comic effect, as in the above hyperbolic instance with the character of Falstaff. This is an ironic use of the term, because Falstaff is an old, fat drunkard—-obviously in no condition to be scaring enemies as he claims to be.

Edgar Allan Poe used bomphiologia as a part of his style. One instance of this is in the following passage

two cats ... alighting opposite one another on my visage, betook themselves to indecorous contention for the paltry consideration of my nose. ("Loss of Breath" 2:159)

This could have been simply stated, "Two cats fought over my nose." Instead, Poe presents a more stylized version which fills out the personality of his narrator. It lets the reader know that the story is told by an unreliable narrator who is prone to exaggeration.
