= Blast from the Past =

Blast from the Past may refer to:

== Film and television ==
- Blast from the Past (film), a 1999 romantic comedy film
- "Blast from the Past!", an episode of The Raccoons
- "Blast from the Past" (Teenage Mutant Ninja Turtles episode), 1989
- "Blast from the Past" (Veronica Mars), 2005
- "Blast from the Past" (NCIS)
- "A Blast from the Past" (Diagnosis: Murder), 1995
- "A Blast from the Past" (Drop the Dead Donkey), 1990
- "Blast from the Past", a segment in the Hamish & Andy Show
- "Blast from the Past", an episode of Dallas
- "Blast from the Past", an episode of NCIS
- "Blast from the Past", an episode of the Happy Tree Friends TV show

== Music ==
- "Blast from the Past", a 2001 song by Quiet Riot from Guilty Pleasures
- Blast from the Past (album), a 2000 album by Gamma Ray
- "Blast from the Past", a song from the musical Zombie Prom

== Literature ==
- Blast from the Past (novel), a 1998 suspense novel by Ben Elton
- "Blast from the Past", a 1997 James Bond short story by Raymond Benson
- Blast from the Past, a book in the Geronimo Stilton series

== See also ==
- Blast from Your Past, an album by Ringo Starr
