= Calvin Simms =

Calvin Simms may refer to:

- Calvin Simms, a character in the 2006 film Little Man
- Calvin Simms, a character in the novel Chart Throb
