= Dead Famous =

Dead Famous may refer to:

- Dead Famous (novel), a 2001 comedy/mystery book by Ben Elton
- Dead Famous (TV series), a television series about the paranormal, presented by Gail Porter
- Dead Famous, a novel in the Mallory series by Carol O'Connell
