= This Other Eden =

This Other Eden may refer to:

- This Other Eden (film), a 1959 Irish comedy drama film directed by Muriel Box
- This Other Eden (Elton novel), a 1993 satirical novel written by Ben Elton
- This Other Eden (Harding novel), a 2023 novel by Paul Harding
- This Other Eden: Seven Great Gardens and 300 Years of English History, a 2005 reference book by Andrea Wulf and Emma Gieben-Gamal
