= Boasting =

To speak with excessive pride and satisfaction about oneself

Boasting or bragging is speaking with excessive pride and self-satisfaction about one's achievements, possessions, or abilities.

Boasting tends to be an attempt to prove one's superiority by recounting accomplishments so that others will feel admiration or envy. It is often done by those who are socially insecure and find other people's perception of them important.

Individuals construct an image of themselves, a personal identity, and present themselves in a manner that is consistent with that image. Theodore Millon theorized that in self-presentation, individuals seek to balance boasting against discrediting themselves with excessive self-promotion or being caught blatantly misrepresenting themselves. Studies show that people often have a limited ability to perceive how their efforts at self-presentation are actually impacting their acceptance and likeability by others.

== Forms of bragging ==
Although a brag can be as straightforward as a simple claim to riches or greatness, it often assumes a variety of more subtle forms in order to shield the speaker from any opprobrium they might otherwise receive for transgressing the social norms of humility. The most popular of these forms is the humblebrag, a term coined by comedian Harris Wittels, whereby the brag is masked in a complaint. For example, "Dating websites are so much work. Every time I log in, I have like a hundred new messages."

== Society and culture ==
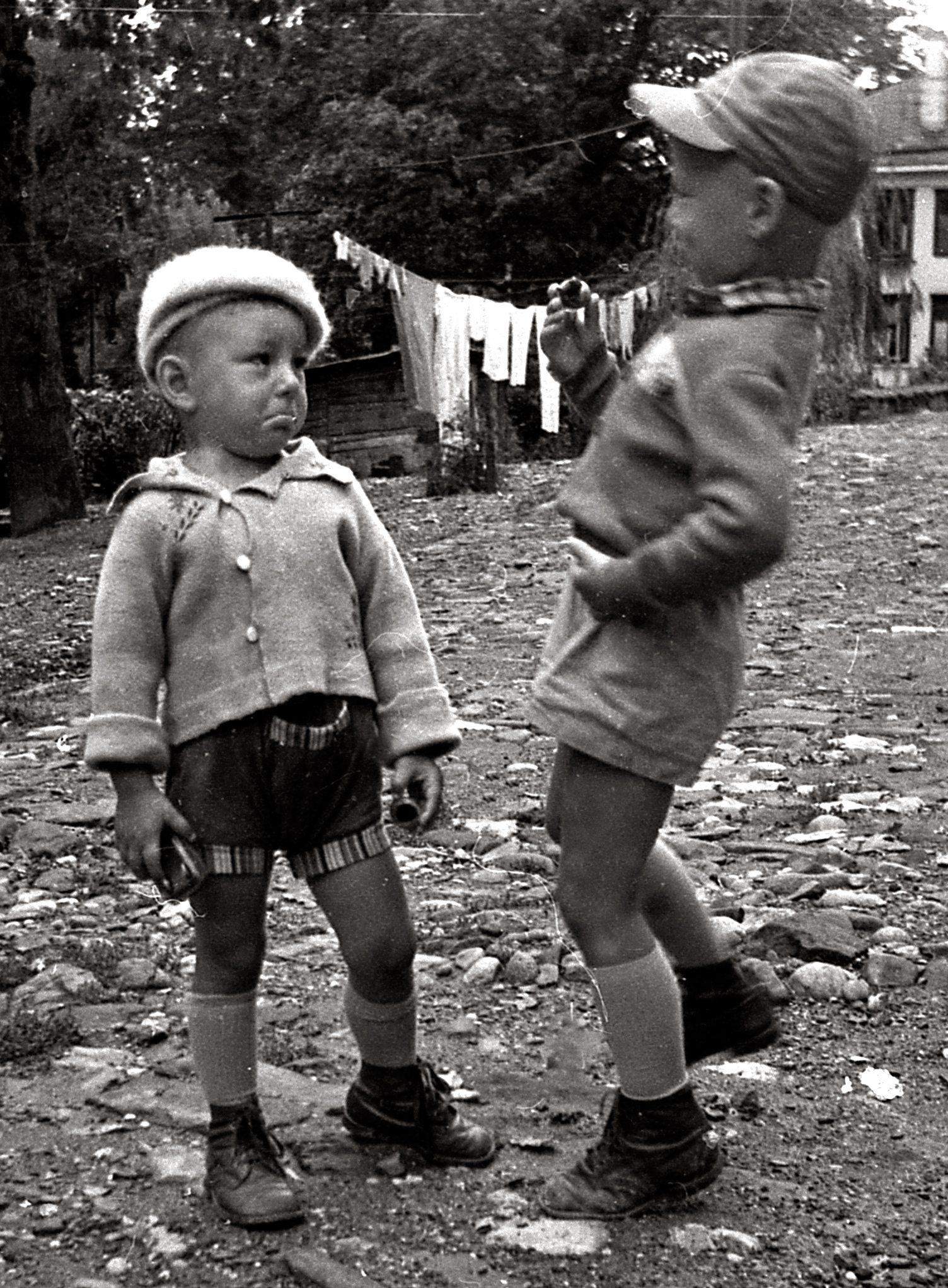
One child boasting to another

The Ancient Greek book The Characters of Theophrastus devotes a chapter to "The Boastful Man".

Bēot is Old English for a ritualized boast, vow, threat or promise, which was usually made by an Anglo-Saxon warrior on the eve of or during battle. Bēots can be found in the epic poem Beowulf, including by the hero himself, such as when he vows to fight Grendel without using any weapons or armor.

A gab (Old Occitan [ˈɡap] for "boast") is a troubadour boasting song.

Boasting and bragging are necessary components of maintaining "face" in some Arab societies.

According to Howard G. Schneiderman, a Sociology Professor at Lafayette College, "vanity and pride, as well as bragging and boosterism, have been the norm in America" since the inception of the country. He puts forth that the discourse around westward expansion was marked by boastfulness. Thus establishing the need to explain boastfulness (due to it being relevant to American history), he writes, "In America, success often counts more than achievement. When these lesser things count more than the greater, bragging and self-advertisement come to the fore because they pay, as they have throughout our history."

Boasting is generally frowned upon, due to its asssociation with arrogance.

=== Fictional characters noted for their boasting ===
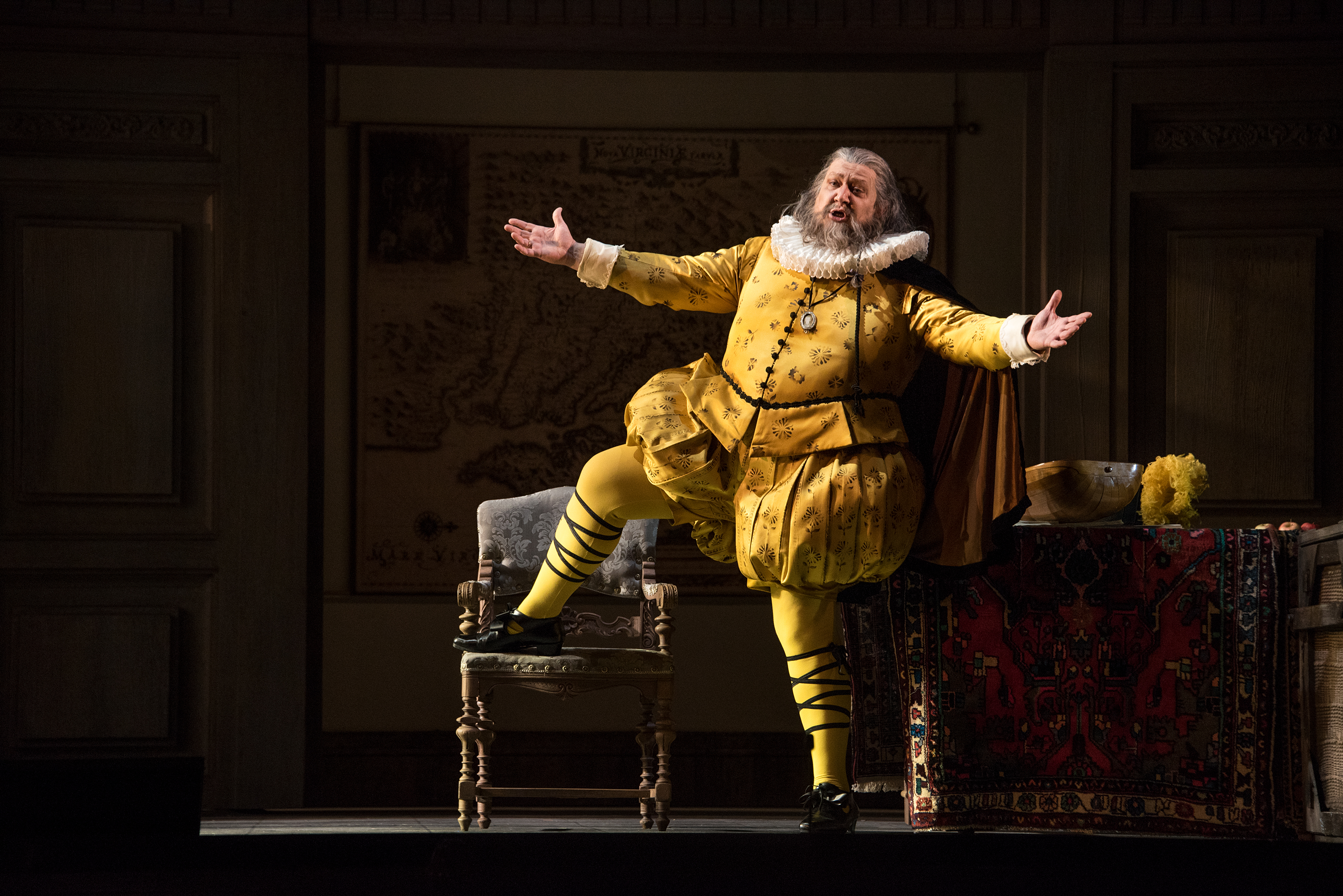
Ambrogio Maestri as Falstaff

- Miles Gloriosus, a stock character from ancient Roman comedy
- Rodomonte, a major character in the Italian romantic epic poems Orlando innamorato by Matteo Maria Boiardo and Orlando furioso by Ludovico Ariosto, which gave rise to the word rodomontade, meaning "boastful, bragging talk"
- Scaramouche, a stock clown character in Italian commedia dell'arte
- Falstaff, in three of William Shakespeare's plays
- Baron Munchausen, a baron made famous by the novel of Rudolf Raspe who enjoys telling fantastical and absurd stories about his adventures abroad. He was based on a real-life German baron who was known for his exaggerated tales.
- The Twelve Idle Servants, a fairy tale by The Brothers Grimm about twelve servants who boast about their incredible laziness.
- Daffy Duck: American cartoon character who often brags about himself. In all of the cartoons he appeared in since the 1950s, he is usually victim of his own overestimations.

== See also ==
- Alazon
- Bomphiologia
- Dozens (game)
- Flyting
- Hubris
- One-upmanship
- Puffery
- Self-promotion
- Virtue signalling
- Funk ostentação
