= Miles Gloriosus (play) =

Ancient Roman play by Plautus

- Original language: Latin
- Written by: Plautus
- Based on: Alazon (lost play)
- Characters: Acroteleutium; Artotrogus; Cario; Lurcio; Milphidippa; Palaestrio; Periplectomenus; Philocomasium; Pleusicles; Pyrgopolynices; Sceledrus; Slave boy
- Genre: Roman comedy
- Setting: Ephesus

Premiere
- Date: late 3rd century BC
- Place: Rome?

Miles Gloriosus is a comic play written by Titus Maccius Plautus (c. 254–184 BC). The title can be translated as "The Swaggering Soldier.” A now lost Greek play, Alazon, or The Braggart, served as a source. The comedy is set in Ephesus, a Greek city on the coast of Asia Minor.

The play is thought to date from early in Plautus's career, partly because it contains no polymetric cantica (songs that do not adhere to a single rhythm, which became frequent in the later plays), and partly because lines 210–211 have been taken as a reference to the temporary imprisonment of the poet Gnaeus Naevius in 206 BC.

At 1,437 lines, it is the longest of Plautus's surviving plays. Some scholars have suggested that it may combine two Greek originals; others have thought this unlikely. De Melo, however, suggests that Periplectomenus's long scene of self-praise (596–812) may come from another play; and the scene with Lurcio, which is not well integrated into the story, is also thought to be an addition invented by Plautus.

== Plot summary ==
=== Backstory and prologue ===
The play commences with the entrance of Pyrgopolynices (the alazon stock character 'Miles Gloriosus' of the play's title), looking heroic and posing in a pompous manner. Several minions carry the soldier's monstrous shield, and behind him is his "parasite", Artotrogus, who earns his meals by flattering the soldier excessively. The soldier constantly boasts about his accomplishments and portrays himself as a fantastic military hero. In reality, his accomplishments are far smaller, hence the play's title. These opening moments give the audience a sense of Pyrgopolynices' true nature.

After the soldier leaves the stage, Palaestrio, one of the main characters of the play, introduces himself. He tells the audience that he is a slave who formerly served a young Athenian, Pleusicles. Pleusicles had a girlfriend named Philocomasium, who was kidnapped from Athens by Pyrgopolynices, the soldier. When Palaestrio tried to reach his master with this bad news, the slave was seized by pirates and given, by chance, to the same soldier. Both he and the girl have been living in the soldier's house in Ephesus, but Palaestrio secretly sent a letter to his former master telling him where they are. Pleusicles has come to Ephesus and is staying with Periplectomenus, who lives next door to the soldier, and the cunning Palaestrio has cut a hole in the wall so the two lovers can meet one another.

=== Palaestrio's Trickery ===
Periplectomenus, an older man of Ephesus, then enters, worried because he has caught Sceledrus, one of Pyrgopolynices' slaves, on the roof, looking in through the skylight. This slave claims he was chasing a monkey, but Periplectomenus is sure that Philocomasium has been seen kissing her lover Pleusicles.

Palaestrio comes up with a plan to tell Pyrgopolynices that Philocomasium has a twin sister visiting Ephesus with her lover and mother and staying with Periplectomenus. Should Sceledrus make accusations, Palaestrio will refute the claim and say it is her twin. Periplectomenus goes back inside to tell Philocomasium what has happened and tell her the plan. Meanwhile, Philocomasium goes through the hole in the wall back into Pyrgopolynices' house, emerging from that house shortly afterward with Palaestrio. Philocomasium tells Sceledrus that she had a dream that her twin sister had arrived from Athens. Sceledrus has his doubts, so Philocomasium goes back into Pyrgopolynices' house, then through the hole in the wall and comes out of the other house as her twin sister. Meanwhile, Sceledrus stands guard outside Pyrgopolynices' house. Philocomasium comes out of Periplectomenus' front door, giving orders to slaves inside. She challenges Sceledrus when he addresses her as Philocomasium, and her manner is that of a free woman. She says her name is Dicea and that she has arrived the previous night from Athens and wants to try to find her twin sister Philocomasium. Sceledrus is now convinced. He promises Palaestrio that he will not speak of this again. Just then, Periplectomenus comes out and is furious at Sceledrus and how he has treated his "lady guest." He threatens to have him whipped but gets over it right away. Sceledrus is distrustful and believes that Periplectomenus and Palaestrio are plotting to catch him when the soldier returns home. He declares that he will lie low for a few days until the matter has cooled.

=== The Plan to Fight the Braggart ===
Palaestrio the slave, Periplectomenus the old man, and Pleusicles the young Athenian, all emerge from the house. Palaestrio has yet another plan to bring down Pyrgopolynices and get Philocomasium back. On request, Periplectomenus hands his ring to Palaestrio, who then explains his plan. He needs Periplectomenus to find an accomplished and beautiful woman, one who can act the part of Periplectomenus' wife and claim to be desperate to leave Periplectomenus for Pyrgopolynices. He also stipulates that this woman should have a maid. Periplectomenus knows just the woman: Acroteleutium, who has a maid called Milphidippa. He brings both women back to his house, explaining the scheme and their role in it. Meanwhile, Palaestrio tells Pyrgopolynices all about Periplectomenus' "wife" and gives him the ring. Pyrgopolynices agrees to meet her but doesn't know what to do with Philocomasium. Palaestrio tells him to let her go, and to let her keep all the gold and jewels that he got her so that she would not be upset.

Pyrgopolynices follows Palaestrio's advice and runs inside to tell Philocomasium. Moments later, he comes back and tells the audience he has succeeded. He gave her everything that she wanted, and he even gave her Palaestrio! At this time, Acroteleutium has come out of the house and begun to describe what she is feeling for the soldier. She proclaims that she can't take it anymore, and that her eyes will cut off her tongue when she catches a glimpse of him. The two meet, and Acroteleutium tells Pyrgopolynices to come to her husband's house. Pyrgopolynices is hesitant in this, but she explains that it was in her dowry that she is the one who gets to keep the house. The soldier tells her to wait inside for him. Just then, Pleusicles enters, dressed as a sailor, to inform Philocomasium that her boat is leaving.

=== The End of the Play ===
The soldier says his final good-byes to Palaestrio and Philocomasium. Then a boy comes out of Periplectomenus's house and informs him that Acroteleutium is expecting him. As he is entering, he is ambushed by Periplectomenus and some slaves including his cook, Cario, who threatens to castrate the adulterer with his knife and hang his testicles round his neck. The men drag him into the street and begin to beat him for trying to make advances on a married woman. Pyrgopolynices begs them to stop; eventually giving the men a hundred drachmae to halt their punches. The men leave the beaten soldier to his own devices, after carrying off his tunic, sword and cloak. Suddenly, Sceledrus returns from accompanying Philocomasium to the port, and tells the soldier what really happened. Pyrgopolynices realizes that he has been tricked by Palaestrio. The play comes to an end when an actor tells the audience to applaud.

== Metrical structure ==
The division of Plautus's comedies into five acts is not thought to go back to Plautus's time, despite the fact that his Greek models were so divided. Instead the plays seem to have been articulated by changes of metre. Often in Plautus's plays a metrical section will begin with iambic senarii (which were spoken without music), then optionally a scene of music in various metres, and finally a scene in trochaic septenarii, which were recited to the accompaniment of tibiae (a pair of reed pipes). Moore calls this the "ABC succession", where A = iambic senarii, B = other metres, C = trochaic septenarii. However, as in this play, the ABC order is sometimes varied.

Looked at in this light, the play can be divided into six sections, as follows:

ACBC, AC, ABCB, ACB, AC, AC

The Miles Gloriosus is unusual in that, unlike all of Plautus's other plays, there are no polymetric cantica, or any songs in cretic or bacchiac metres; in fact only four metres are used in the whole play. The four musical "B" passages, as Moore points out, are all scenes involving women, and use these two metres:

- Iambic septenarii (354–425): Philocomasium
- Iambic septenarii (874–946): Acroteleutium
- Anapaestic septenarii (1011–1093): Milphidippa
- Iambic septenarii (1216–1283): Acroteleutium and Milphidippa

Iambic septenarii were sung to, or accompanied by music, and are frequently used in Roman comedy in scenes associated with love.

It has been suggested that the Miles Gloriosus has a symmetrical construction. The opening, describing the arrogance of Pyrgopolynices and his abduction of Philocomasium, is mirrored by the ending, describing the rescue of Philocomasium and the humiliation of the soldier; while the two tricks played against the slave Sceledrus balance the two tricks played against Pyrgopolynices. A similar symmetrical scheme has been detected in the Bacchides.

=== The tricking of Sceledrus (i) ===
- Act 1–2.1 (1–155): iambic senarii (155 lines)

The soldier Pyrgopolynices orders some slaves to polish his shield and boasts about his prowess in imaginary battles. Artotrogus, a parasite in search of a meal, flatters him about his battles and his good looks. They leave for the forum so that the soldier can "enlist mercenaries for King Seleucus".

When the soldier has gone, the slave Palaestrio tells the audience the background to the play. He says that formerly he lived in Athens as slave to a young man who was in love with a courtesan who loved him equally. Once, when the young man was away, the soldier had carried off the girl against her will to Ephesus to be his concubine. Palaestrio himself had set out on a boat to inform his master, but had been captured by pirates and by chance ended up enslaved to the same Pyrgopolynices. He had managed to get a message to his former master, who had come to Ephesus and was staying in the next-door house; and Palaestrio had secretly made a hole in the dividing wall so that the lovers could meet.

- Act 2.2–2.3 (156–353): trochaic septenarii (200 lines)

Periplectomenus, the old man who owns the house next door, gives Palaestrio some bad news: one of Pyrgopolynices' slaves has climbed on the roof of the house, apparently chasing an escaped monkey, and through the skylight (impluvium) has spotted the young man and the girl kissing together. Palaestrio thinks for a while (it seems that here Palaestrio does a gestural dance in time to the music and Periplectomenus's words) and comes up with a plan: they must pretend that the girl he saw is her twin sister. Periplectomenus goes back inside to warn Philocomasium to return to the soldier's house immediately.

Sceledrus, the slave who had been on the roof, and who had been ordered to watch over the courtesan Philocomasium, tells Palaestrio what he has seen. Palaestrio points out that Sceledrus is in a bind: if Philocomasium left the house while he was supposed to be guarding her, he will be punished; if he says nothing, he will equally be punished. Palaestrio, however, after going inside to check, comes out and reassures him that Philocomasium is still at home.

- Act 2.4–2.5 (354–425): iambic septenarii (72 lines)

Palaestrio brings Philocomasium out into the street. Sceledrus is amazed to see her coming from the soldier's house. Philocomasium scolds him for inventing stories and then tells of a dream in which it seemed to her that her twin sister had come to Ephesus to find her. She goes back inside. Immediately afterwards, she comes out again, this time from Periplectomenus's door, pretending to tell a slave to prepare a sacrifice for her safe arrival by sea. Sceledrus calls her by name but she acts as if she doesn't know him.

- Act 2.5 (426–480): trochaic septenarii (55 lines)

When questioned by Palaestrio, Philocomasium says her name is Dicea, and she has just arrived by sea looking for her twin sister. Sceledrus grabs hold of her but she escapes back into Periplectomenus's house. Palaestrio pretends that he agrees with Sceledrus that the girl is Philocomasium and asks Sceledrus to go into the soldier's house to fetch a sword. A moment later a puzzled Sceledrus comes out to say that Philocomasium is at home after all. Advising him to keep quiet about the matter, Palaestrio goes into Periplectomenus's house.

=== The tricking of Sceledrus (ii) ===
- Act 2.6 (481–595): iambic senarii (114 lines)

Sceledrus remains in the street keeping watch. Suddenly Periplectomenus comes out and angrily threatens that he will have Sceledrus whipped for his rudeness to his guest, as well as for climbing on his roof and breaking his tiles. He invites him to go inside his (Periplectomenus's) house and see the girl for himself. As soon as Sceledrus has gone inside, he calls to Philocomasium, perhaps through a window, and tells her to go to the other house quickly. Sceledrus comes out and Periplectomenus suggests he go back to the soldier's house to check if Philocomasium is there. Sceledrus goes to check and comes out again confessing that he was wrong. Sceledrus resolves to hide until the matter has cooled down and goes inside. Periplectomenus, chuckling at how easy it has been to fool Sceledrus, goes back to his own house.

- Act 3.1 (596–812): trochaic septenarii (214 lines)

Palaestrio comes out into the street and after checking that the coast is clear he calls Periplectomenus and Pleusicles outside for a meeting. Pleusicles tells Periplectomenus that he is embarrassed to have caused him so much expense and trouble, but Periplectomenus assures him that it is no trouble at all. He goes on to describe his own character and describes the advantages of being a bachelor. This gives Palaestrio an idea for another plan. He tells Periplectomenus to find a clever woman who will pretend that she is his wife. Then she is to send her maidservant with a ring and a message that she is dying to see Pyrgopolynices.

=== The tricking of Pyrgopolynices (i) ===
- Act 3.2 (813–873): iambic senarii (59 lines)

Palaestrio calls for Sceledrus to come outside. But another slave, Lurcio, tells him that Sceledrus is fast asleep, apparently drunk. Palaestrio threatens to inform the master that both were drunk. Lurcio runs off, saying he has an errand for Philocomasium.

- Act 3.3 (874–946): iambic septenarii (71 lines)

Periplectomenus approaches bringing a courtesan called Acroteleutium and her maid Milphidippa. Acroteleutium reassures him that she is quite clever enough to carry out his plans. On meeting Palaestrio she tells him she is very ready to deceive the soldier. The women and Periplectomenus go inside.

- Act 4.1–4.2 (947–1010): trochaic septenarii (64 lines)

Pyrgopolynices approaches, boasting of having recruited a regiment for King Seleucus. Palaestrio shows him the ring and says that there is a young married woman who is dying to meet him. Pyrgopolynices is interested. The maid Milphidippa now comes out and, pretending not to see them, starts talking to herself about the soldier's handsome looks.

- Act 4.2 (1011–1093): anapaestic septenarii (82 lines)

While Pyrgopolynices listens, Palaestrio addresses Milphidippa and tells her that the person she is looking for is near at hand. Milphidippa starts wooing Pyrgopolynices on behalf of her mistress and promises that she will bring him a large dowry too. She goes back inside.

=== The tricking of Pyrgopolynices (ii) ===
- Act 4.3 (1094–1136): iambic senarii (43 lines)

Palaestrio suggests to Pyrgopolynices that he should send away Philocomasium, giving her her gold jewellery in compensation, so that he will be free to marry the new lady. The soldier goes inside, telling Palaestrio to keep watch for Acroteleutium.

- Act 4.4–4.5 (1137–1215): trochaic septenarii (78 lines)

Acroteleutium, her maid Milphidippa, and the young man Pleusicles now appear. Palaestrio tells them the news and gives final instructions what they are to do to complete the deception. He instructs Pleusicles to dress up as a ship-captain and come and inform Philocomasium that her ship is about to depart. Pyrgopolynices now comes out and tells Palaestrio that he has persuaded Philocomasium to leave, and that he has given Palaestrio to her as a gift to take with her.

- Act 4.6 (1216–1283): iambic septenarii (68 lines)

Acroteleutium and Milphidippa come out of Perplectomenus's house and, pretending not to see Pyrgoplynices, stage a conversation in which Acroteleutium says she will die if she can't be with Pyrgopolynices. Acroteleutium goes to the soldier's door and pretends to be desperate to enter. Milphidippa goes to the soldier and tells him that the house next door actually belongs to Acroteleutium and that she has already divorced her husband and sent him from the house. She invites the soldier to go to that house. The two women go back to Periplectomenus's house. Suddenly the soldier sees Pleusicles approaching, dressed as a ship-captain with an eye patch.

=== The escape of Philocomasium and Palaestrio ===
- Act 4.7 (1284–1310): iambic senarii (27 lines)

Pleusicles arrives. He says that his ship is about to sail and he requests that Philocomasium hurry to the ship. Pyrgopolynices gives his permission for her to go and even orders slaves to carry her possessions to the ship.

- Act 4.8 (1311–1377): trochaic septenarii (67 lines)

Philocomasium comes out, weeping and pretending to be sorry to leave Pyrgopolynices. She departs with Pleusicles. Palaestrio stays behind for a few moments to say farewell to Pyrgopolynices.

=== The humiliation of Pyrgopolynices ===
- Act 4.9 (1378–1393): iambic senarii (16 lines)

A boy comes out of Periplectomenus's house, greets the soldier politely and invites him inside.

- Act 5 (1394–1437): trochaic septenarii (44 lines)

As soon as he enters, Pyrgopolynices is seized by Periplectomenus's slaves and dragged outside into the street. He is beaten up severely, for having dared to seduce another man's wife. They refuse to let him go until he has promised to pay them a pound of gold, and given up his clothes and weapon. They go inside, and Sceledrus comes back from the harbour. Too late Pyrgopolynices learns from Sceledrus that Pleusicles and Palaestrio have tricked him.

== Characters ==
- Acroteleutium (meretrix 'courtesan'): she is hired to play the wife of Periplectomenus in the plot to deceive Pyrgopolynices. She pretends to be married but madly in love with Pyrgopolynices.
- Artotrogus (parasitus 'suck-up, sponge'; his name means "bread-eater"): a poor man who hangs around Pyrgopolynices, agreeing with him and entertaining him in exchange for food. Artotrogus also plays a subversive role, making snide, humorous comments off to the side about how idiotic Pyrgopolynices is. So daft is Pyrgopolynices that he genuinely believes Artotrogus is loyal.
- Cario (cocus 'cook'): Periplectomenus' cook. Along with the other slaves he beats up Pyrgopolynices and threatens to castrate him with his knife.
- Lurcio (or Lucrio?) (servus ebrius 'drunken slave'): slave to Pyrgopolynices, extra comedic fool, and drunkard.
- Milphidippa (ancilla 'maidservant, female slave'): the servant of the courtesan Acroteleutium. Her purpose in the narrative is to make Acroteleutium appear more wealthy and desirable by talking her up. She attracts Pyrgopolynices' attentions as well and must be saved from his affection by Palaestrio. Her interaction with Pyrgopolynices reveals his wanton lack of scruples and respect for women. Having taken Philocomasium without her consent, he barely retracts his intent to take a spoken-for Milphidippa.
- Palaestrio (servus callidus 'clever slave'): slave to Pyrgopolynices, he was originally Pleusicles' slave but was captured by pirates and given to Pyrgopolynices. He masterminds the deception of Sceledrus and his master so as to reunite his former master with his girlfriend. The only one who knows the full extent of the lies told to move the plot along, Palaestrio orchestrates the entire scheme to return Philocomasium to Pleusicles. The dramatic irony created by Palaestrio's asides adds interest and humor to the already hilarious predicament he expertly solves.
- Periplectomenus (lepidus senex 'jovial old man'): an 54-year-old bachelor of Ephesus and neighbor of Pyrgopolynices. He helps Palaestrio out with his plan to bring down his braggart neighbor. He houses Philocomasium's lover and suggests to Palaestrio to cut an opening through the party wall into the adjoining house so that Philocomasium can come and go as she pleases. He gives a long speech on the advantages of remaining single. He prefers freedom over children and worry. Happy living his life as he wishes, he says he does not regret leaving behind no heir. Though a bachelor and self-proclaimed crank, he is willing to risk himself for others as he helps connive to bring the lovers back together. His actions show an obvious soft spot in his heart for love. There is possibly something slightly effeminate about him: he complains that the soldier's servants take him for "a woman not a man"; he eschews boorish behavior, claims that he makes an excellent dinner-guest and boasts that he can dance better than a cinaedus malacus (camp homosexual).
- Philocomasium (meretrix 'courtesan'; her name means "Lover of little parties"): Athenian lover of Pleusicles, she is abducted by Pyrgopolynices. A cunning and intelligent woman, she masquerades as her own twin sister to aid in her escape from Pyrgopolynices.
- Pleusicles (adulescens amans 'young man in love'): a young man from Athens who has enlisted the help of his former slave, Palaestrio, to get back his girlfriend, Philocomasium, from the man who has taken her, Pyrgopolynices. He politely regrets causing trouble and expense to his host in Ephesus, Periplectomenus. In the duping of Pyrgopolynices he plays the role of ship-captain and dresses up in a cloak with an eye-patch which catches Pyrgopolynices' attention.
- Pyrgopolynices (miles gloriosus 'braggart soldier'; his name means "Taker of many towers"): the character the play is named after, he is a soldier who brags about the many feats he has accomplished on the battlefield and in the bedroom. From the opening scene to the play's end his great deeds are shown to be as hollow as his character is deluded. The other characters easily trick him by feeding his ravenous ego. He is described by Palaestrio as having "the hide of an elephant and no more intelligence than a stone", and by Acroteleutium as a "hated by the people" and a "swaggering, frizzle-headed, perfumed debauchee".
- Sceledrus (servus stultus 'stupid slave'): slave to Pyrgopolynices and at the play's start caught spying on the house of Periplectomenus. He sees Philocomasium embracing her true love Pleusicles. He must be duped lest he spoil Palaestrio's entire plot to restore Philocomasium to her lover. He is easily tricked by Palaestrio into thinking he has not seen what he really has. His confusion leads him to great distress and to a wine-induced sleep. His gullibility functions as a source of comic relief in the play. Palaestrio twice teases him about his name, because of its resemblance to the Latin word scelus 'crime'.
- A slave boy (puer 'slave boy'): appearing only briefly in the play, he invites Pyrgopolynices into Periplectomenus's home to meet Acroteleutium. He seems to remind the audience of what is about to happen, and prepare them for the drama at the end of the play when Pyrgopolynices realizes he was set up.

== Significance ==
Roman comedy normally presents an erotic intrigue between a young man and a young woman, usually blocked by some opposition, such as the father (figure) of the young woman. During the play, this opposition is dealt with through various twists in the plot, and everything works out for the hero. Roman Comedy always has a happy ending, often taking place in a festival or party. In Miles Gloriosus the slave and townspeople work together to overthrow the soldier. Although we don't know the true past of the Braggart Soldier, we do know that he is the opposition that the two lovers must get through to be with each other.

William S. Anderson suggests that the quality of "heroic badness" has transformed the main character from a conventional hero to a clever slave who outwits his master. The reason is that more people could relate to the slave, and he was the only character that did not look foolish by the end of the play. Palaestrio solved the problem and defeated the soldier using his mind and not his brawn.

The stock character of the Braggart Soldier originated from this play. Afterward, he became a familiar character in many plays, transforming into other types of characters in later years. The Italian Commedia character, Il Capitano is an adaptation of the Braggart Soldier, as is Shakespeare's Ancient Pistol.

== Models for the play ==
The Miles Gloriosus is believed to be adapted from a Greek comedy from the age of New Comedy, but it is not known from which author it is derived. Because there are two separate intrigues (the hole in the wall and the fake wife), and some puzzling details such as the lack of coherence between the end of Act 2 and the beginning of Act 3, it has been argued by some scholars that to make the plot Plautus may have joined two separate Greek plays; however, other scholars have argued that there is insufficient evidence for this assumption. In her article, Blanche Brotherton points out that double intrigues are fairly common in comedic plots, and one Greek comedy, the Δὶς Ἐξαπατῶν (Dìs Exapatôn) "The Twice Deceiving" (the original of Plautus's Bacchides) even indicates a double intrigue in the title.

A more likely suggestion is that not the double intrigue, but the long and amusing (but irrelevant) discourse of Periplectomenus on the advantages of being unmarried (Act 3.1, lines 596–765) comes partly from another play, and in part is invented by Plautus himself. It is also thought that the scene with the drunken slave Lurcio or Lucrio (Act 3.2) is a Plautine addition, not part of the original Greek play.

The story itself contains elements which are familiar from a number of folk-tales recounted in later centuries in oriental countries: the hole in the wall through which the lovers meet, their escape by ship, assistance by the dupe himself, the dupe's surrender of the faithful slave and gift of valuables to the departing heroine are found in tales from Albania, Syria, Iraq, and Central Asia.

== Themes ==
=== Archetype of the Boastful Soldier ===
The miles gloriosus is the archetype of the boastful soldier (alazon) trope, so much so that his ego becomes his downfall. He tells many lies about himself: he crushes an elephant's hind leg with his fist, his children live a thousand years, and his would be a kingship were he alive at a different time. He believes that everyone loves him. In actuality, he is universally despised. His hubris undoes him as the other characters are able to steal back from under his nose the girl that he previously had stolen. An old man, a prostitute, and a slave work together to deceive him and steal the girl back. Posing as his neighbor's wife the prostitute pretends to be in love with him. Because he is so egotistical, he believes her. Without suspecting a trick, he loses the girl, and the lovers are reunited.

=== Children and Wives ===
The debate about getting married and having children is one that Plautus, through the character Periplectomenus, brings up in the play. The senex, Periplectomenus, makes a long speech about his views on marriage and children. He states that it is not ideal to get married and that there is no use for having children. He thinks women only talk about frivolous matters and that they spend too much money; he does not want to be financially responsible for a wife or for children. He also states that he would worry too much about his children if he were to have any. This discussion of marriage and children shows the readers the positive and negative aspects of being married and having children. His views, however, run counter to other significant events in the play. The prostitutes show themselves as generous and kind when they help trick Pyrgopolynices and reunite the lovers. In doing so they also show their wit and resourcefulness. Periplectomenus himself shows a willingness to undergo hardship and risk in helping out a fellow creature. In sum his views on marriage and wives seem out of place in a play that otherwise offers kindness, generosity, and sacrifice as the antidote to ego, greed, and rapacity.

=== Drinking and Drunkards ===
Though not a major part of the play or plot Plautus does explore the theme of drinking and drunkenness through the characters of Lurcio and Sceledrus. A slave of Pyrgopolynices, Lurcio encounters Palaestrio as he searches for Sceledrus. During this encounter Lurcio admits, in a rather sarcastic manner, that Sceledrus is asleep and that both he and Sceledrus are drunk on their master's stolen wine. Initially upset because he is unable to speak with Sceledrus, Palaestrio soon regains his composure. Through this scene Plautus provides comic relief, portraying the unifying laughter that alcohol can promote. Alcohol is the vehicle that awakens a person's joviality, enhancing their, and thereby the audience's, overall level of enjoyment. In this same scene Plautus also displays its negative effects. A few of them are theft, addiction, and lethargy. Both Lurcio and Sceledra know full well that they will face severe punishment if they are caught stealing their master's wine, but their addiction is sufficiently deep for them to disregard the potential consequences of their actions. An additional negative of alcohol is its sloth-inducing effect. After drinking heavily Sceledrus, who is supposed to be watching over Philocomasium, abandons his duties and responsibilities and instead falls asleep. Though he does not make it a major part of the play, Plautus does offer a nuanced look into the highs and lows of drinking and drunkenness.

=== Pride Cometh and then the Fall ===
Pyrgopolynices exhibits characteristics of the stock character, miles gloriosus, who boasts in an arrogant and self-righteous manner. His relationship with his hanger-on, Artotrogus, the stock character of the parasitus, reveals that he relies on others to glorify his deluded sense of self. So conceited is Pyrgopolynices, constantly talking about his many victories on the battlefield and in the bedroom, that Artotrogus is hardly needed. At first glance a character used solely to boost his master's ego, Artotrogus is primarily driven by his incessant need for food. His shameless compliments are so outrageously offered that they reveal a hidden agenda for his seemingly superfluous part: the compliments he offers are really insults, earning him his board and exposing his master's idiocy. Pyrgopolynices' pride blinds him to it all. He is fooled consistently by his underlings and everyone else whom he considers beneath him. His overdeveloped pride stands in stark contrast to a severely underdeveloped intellect that leaves him easy prey to his slave Palaestrio's machinations. Palaestrio cleverly pulls the wool over his master's eyes and frees the stolen Philocomasium from him. Easily the biggest fool of the play, Pyrgopolynices is readily manipulated and tricked by Palaestrio and others around him. The very women Pyrgopolynices lists as his conquests and idolizers mock, dupe, and deflate him. Plautus's work shows that in creating characters who appear masculine and macho but lack basic intelligence he is commenting on the Rome of his time and suggesting that true virtue and character lie within the hearts and minds of Romans with the ability to self-reflect and see the world through another's eyes.

=== Substance Trumps Style ===
Pyrgopolynices, the miles gloriosus, thinks of himself as a great general with great achievements and with great looks. In reality, his achievements are insignificant, his actual military prowess is inept, and his looks rendered repulsive by his character. For conquest he steals from Athens a defenseless woman by tricking with gifts her mother into thinking he is a nice guy. When the mother's back is turned he steals the daughter from underneath her. His exceptional brawn will be overpowered by play's end by a lowly cook. Pyrgopolynices consistently refers to his handsomeness and how it is such a curse because women who come across him are instantly attracted to him and will not stop pestering him. In reality, women abhor him and his presence. Pyrgopolynices' tremendous ego is matched by his fabulous stupidity. He is easily tricked by his slave, Palaestrio, the callidus servus, and thereby loses the woman he had abducted. In presenting an authority figure as so inept and devoid of any sense of self or decency, Plautus comments on the Rome of his time and presages the generals to come who will wreak havoc on the common folk of the dying Republic.

=== The Triumph of Virtue over Vice ===
Over the course of the play, the protagonist Palaestrio and his cohort behave as good Greek (or, rather, Roman) citizens, exhibiting such virtues as hospitality and generosity (Periplectomenus), loyalty (Palaestrio to Pleusicles), and virtue (Philocomasium). Conversely, Pyrgopolynices and his household engage in vice, including womanizing and boastfulness (Pyrgopolynices) and sloth and excessive drinking (Lurcio and Sceledrus). Palaestrio and his cohort show the value of cooperation when they work together to convince Sceledrus (idiocy) that he did not see what he actually did. Later, by succeeding in tricking Pyrgopolynices (vanity and ego) and reuniting the lovers, Palaestrio and his allies show the superiority of virtue over vice. This is reinforced in the end as Pyrgopolynices, recognizing his defeat, remarks to the audience that they should 'serve all lechers so, and lechery will grow less rife'. His concession is a clear denunciation by the playwright of the soldier's corrupt ways.

=== Unexpected Heroes ===
The title of the play, The Swaggering Soldier, suggests that the hero is Pyrgopolynices, the Miles Gloriosus. Nothing could be further from the truth. The play's true hero comes from the unlikeliest of places—a slave. Before the play's start, Pyrgropolynices steals Philocomasium from her home, mother, and lover, Pleusicles. Palaestrio, Pyrgopolynices' slave and the play's true hero, seeks to right his master's wrong and reunite Philocomasium with her true love. He masterminds a plan to trick his fellow slave Sceledrus and his master Pyrgopolynices so that Philocomasium and Pleusicles can live happily ever after. Exploiting the stupidity of Sceledrus and Pyrgopolynices, Palaestrio succeeds. In this play Plautus shows his audience that anyone can be a hero, regardless of their situation.

== Translations ==
- Henry Thomas Riley, 1912: Miles Gloriosus full text
- Paul Nixon, 1916–38
- George E. Duckworth, 1942
- E. F. Watling, 1965
- Paul Roche, 1968
- Erich Segal, 1969
- Peter L. Smith, 1991
- Robert Wind, 1995
- Deena Berg and Douglass Parker, 1999
- Plautus. "The Braggart Soldier", Four Comedies, Oxford Press, 1996.
- Anderson, William S. Barbarian Play: Plautus' Roman Comedy. Toronto. University of Toronto Press, 1993.
- Eight Great Comedies, Ed. Sylvan Barnet, Morton Berman, William Burto. Penguin Books, USA Inc
- Frye, Northrop. Anatomy of Criticism: Four essays. Princeton, New Jersey. Princeton University Press. 1957.
- Bentley, Eric. The Life of The Drama. Atheneum, New York. 1964.
- Wolfang de Melo, 2011

== In popular culture ==
The character "Miles Gloriosus" in A Funny Thing Happened on the Way to the Forum takes his name from this play.
