= Gridlock (novel) =

1991 novel by Ben Elton

- First edition
- Author: Ben Elton
- Language: English
- Genre: Dystopian Fiction
- Publisher: Little, Brown
- Publication date: 1991
- Publication place: United Kingdom
- Media type: Print
- Pages: 448
- ISBN: 0356197107
- Preceded by: Stark (1989)
- Followed by: This Other Eden (1993)

Gridlock is a 1991 novel by Ben Elton.

== Plot ==
The novel depicts a near-future London in which traffic congestion has reached almost critical levels, such that accidents in a few key places could bring the entire city's traffic network to a halt. The government is aware of the problem and plans a major new road-building program to relieve the pressure. The alternative, heavy investment in public mass transport systems such as railways, is ignored because it clashes with the government's ideology. The author argues that this is a highly misguided policy since, in his view, more roads have historically tended to simply generate more traffic and so create an even bigger problem in the long run.

The climax of the book sees shadowy, possibly government-backed forces deliberately instigate the necessary simultaneous accidents which do indeed bring the whole of London to a standstill for several days. The resulting chaos is used as an excuse to press ahead with the road-building scheme.

== Allusions/references to actual history, geography and current science ==
The novel is a satire of Prime Minister Margaret Thatcher's government policies, which emphasised road traffic over rail or other public transportation.

Another major element in the novel revolves round a character with cerebral palsy – he is the inventor of a hydrogen-based power system for cars – green energy – that sinister forces, most likely representing the oil industry, seek to suppress. His disability is aggressive-sympathetically handled, for example he actively embraces the word 'spastic', claiming it back, taking it away from the term of abuse it had become (in the UK) at the time of publication.

== Reception ==
Graham Nowland of the Bucks Free Press complimented the book's density of humour, and recommended it for fans of Elton's previous works. On the other hand, Adrienne Hunter, writing in The Northern Echo, while agreeing that the messages of the book where important, criticised the work's lack of subtlety.
