= Time and Time Again (novel) =

2014 novel by Ben Elton

- Author: Ben Elton
- Language: English
- Genre: Novel
- Publication date: 2014
- Publication place: United Kingdom

Time and Time Again is a 2014 novel by Ben Elton. In a fictional 2024, former soldier and University of Cambridge graduate Hugh Stanton is summoned to go back in time and prevent the outbreak of World War I. A review of the book in The Guardian notes that it "has the makings of a decent Young Adult novel" A book review in the Irish Examiner was of the opinion that "the novel that started with such a bang, ended with a fizzle."
