= Twiggy The Musical =

Biopic musical

Twiggy
- The Musical
- Music: Various
- Lyrics: Various
- Book: Ben Elton
- Basis: The life of Twiggy
- Premiere: 18 September 2023: Menier Chocolate Factory, London
- Productions: 2023 Off-West End; 2025 UK tour

Twiggy The Musical is a jukebox musical with a book by Ben Elton, based on the life of British model Twiggy.

== Production history ==
=== World premiere: Off-West End (2023) ===
The musical originally titled as Close-Up: The Twiggy Musical had its world premiere Off West End at the Menier Chocolate Factory, beginning previews on 18 September 2023, running until 18 November. It was written and directed by Ben Elton, choreographed by Jacob Fearey, set designed by Tim Bird and costume designed by Jonathan Lipman, with a cast featuring Elena Skye as Twiggy.

=== UK tour (2025) ===
It was announced that the musical will begin a national tour (under the new name of Twiggy The Musical) at the Everyman Theatre, Cheltenham from 4 September 2025. It is produced by the Everyman Theatre in association with the Menier Chocolate Factory.
