= Identity Crisis (novel) =

2019 novel by Ben Elton

- Cover of the 2019 Random House edition
- Author: Ben Elton
- Language: English
- Publication date: 2019

Identity Crisis is a 2019 novel by British writer and entertainer Ben Elton. While described as "murder mystery", it is "about all kinds of politics" according to Elton as interviewed in New Zealand website Stuff. The novel has been described as a satire of identity politics: the novel's characters include transgender, incel and other contentious identities.
