= High Society (novel) =

2002 novel by Ben Elton

- First edition
- Author: Ben Elton
- Language: English
- Genre: Novel
- Publisher: Bantam Press
- Publication date: 7 November 2002
- Publication place: United Kingdom
- Media type: Print (Hardback)
- ISBN: 0-552-99995-4 (hardback edition)
- OCLC: 52057873
- Preceded by: Dead Famous (2001)
- Followed by: Past Mortem (2004)

High Society (2002) is a darkly comic novel by English author Ben Elton. The story focuses on Peter Paget, a Labour Party MP, and his mission to legalise all recreational drugs in the United Kingdom. The abridged audiobook was read by Rik Mayall.

== Plot summary ==
It also follows several other characters:

- Tommy Hanson. Tommy Hanson is Britain's most successful musical artist and became famous after winning Pop Hero (ostensibly a reference to Pop Idol). He is an abuser of several drugs and narrates his story to people at his NA and AA meetings. His character is possibly inspired by Robbie Williams, whose name is mentioned several times in the novel.
- Jessie. Jessie is a seventeen-year-old Scottish girl who, after running away from home to London, was coerced into prostitution. The story follows her battle to escape her pimp and her battle against her drug addiction.
- Commander Barry Leman, a high ranking police officer who becomes obsessed with a personal quest for justice when a friend of his daughter's is horrifically sexually assaulted (and subsequently commits suicide) as a way of threatening him over his involvement with Peter Paget's campaign.
- Emily Hilton-Smith, a drug-addicted socialite who publicly renounces drug use and joins Paget's campaign after the events of a night out force her to confront her addiction.
- Samantha Spencer, Paget's beautiful but psychologically unhinged mistress.
- Sonia, a teenage drug mule imprisoned in a Thai jail.

== Influence ==
Udta Punjab is a 2016 Bollywood film, based on drug abuse. Directed and written by Abhishek Chaubey, the film has been alleged to be inspired from the novel. Similarities between the film and the novel such as names and professions of the drug abusing protagonists of High Society and Udta Punjab (both are musical artist named Tommy), the circumstances of the meeting between Tommy and the female characters Jessie/Bauria (played by Alia Bhatt in the film), Jessie/Bauria's back story (both run away from home after their dreams of becoming sports stars are quashed), and several other specific instances, such as the tattoo Tommy (in both stories) has inked. The makers of the film however have denied any inspiration from the novel.
