= Popcorn (novel) =

1996 novel by Ben Elton

- First edition
- Author: Ben Elton
- Cover artist: Paul Campion
- Language: English
- Genre: Satire
- Publisher: Simon & Schuster
- Publication date: 5 August 1996
- Publication place: United Kingdom
- Media type: Print (Hardcover & paperback)
- Pages: 298 p.
- ISBN: 978-0552772976
- Preceded by: This Other Eden (1993)
- Followed by: Blast from the Past (1998)

Popcorn is a 1996 novel by the British writer Ben Elton. It shares themes with a number of movies from the mid-1990s, most notably Natural Born Killers by Oliver Stone and Pulp Fiction and Reservoir Dogs by Quentin Tarantino.

== Plot summary ==
The book takes place in different parts of Los Angeles, California. The date is never actually specified, but various clues suggest it is set in the near future. Mostly the story takes place in the centre of Hollywood. The book depicts the differences between different social groups in America, from rich people with guards like Bruce Delamitri to poorer people Wayne and Scout.

The protagonist, Bruce Delamitiri, is an artist who works in the motion picture industry. Many people in the US think that, by making these movies, Bruce makes killing cool. Numerous characters throughout the book imply that he encourages everyone who's watching these movies to kill for fun. Bruce, on the other hand, defends himself by telling everyone that he doesn't think he encourages anyone to do anything. He says that there has always been violence but humans are not like robots; seeing something on the screen does not necessarily make us want to do it ourselves (p. 13 "people get up from the movie theatre or the TV and do what they just saw"). He also claims that he is just showing existing violence.

Unfortunately for Bruce, Wayne and Scout (a pair of psychopaths known in the media as the "Mall Murderers") have formulated a plan to hold him hostage and have him publicly announce that his movies are responsible for their crimes so they can avoid the death penalty (Wayne has a lengthy speech giving examples of how in America it is possible to be guilty and innocent at the same time.) As the novel progresses, Bruce and a critically injured Brooke Daniels are joined inside his house by his wife and daughter and a TV camera crew. The siege reaches its climax as Wayne holds a ratings monitor and announces on live TV that he will spare the hostages if everyone stops watching the siege in the next few minutes - however, this does not happen and he begins firing as the LAPD begin a frantic attempt to subdue him.

Many of the characters die in the ensuing violence and the epilogue of the story reveals grim details as to how all the survivors have found a way of escaping responsibility for the tragedy using varying routes from lawsuits and finding religion to making documentaries which explicitly blame everyone else. The book ends with the line "No one has taken responsibility" — echoing an earlier rant by Bruce that we have created a blame free society in which any problem or shortcoming can be blamed on others rather than accepting responsibility for our own actions.

== Characters ==
- Bruce Delamitri – the main protagonist, an egocentric filmmaker who has become controversial for the celluloid violence he produces.
- Wayne – A cruel and immoral killer.
- Scout – Wayne's lover and confidant.
- Brooke Daniels – A vaguely abnormal model and aspiring actress.
- Velvet Delamitri – Bruce's estranged daughter.
- Farrah Delamitri – Bruce's estranged wife.
- Karl Brezner – Bruce's agent.

== Awards and nominations ==
It won the 1996 Crime Writers' Association's Gold Dagger Award.

== Theatrical version ==
Elton penned a play based on the novel, which premiered at the Nottingham Playhouse in 1996, and later played in London's West End.
