= Ben Elton =

British comedian and playwright (born 1959)

Ben Elton AM
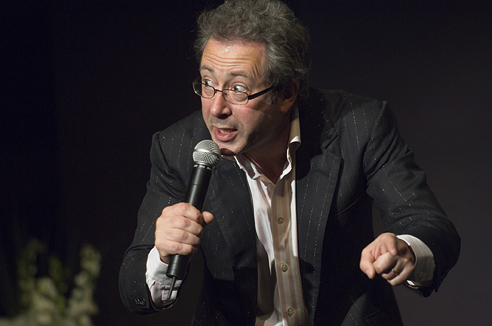
- Elton in 2009
- Born: Benjamin Charles Elton; 3 May 1959 (age 67); Fitzrovia, London, England
- Citizenship: United Kingdom; Australia
- Education: University of Manchester
- Occupations: Actor; author; comedian; director; writer
- Years active: 1981–present
- Notable work: The Young Ones; Blackadder; Filthy Rich & Catflap; Mr. Bean; The Thin Blue Line; Upstart Crow
- Spouse: Sophie Gare (m. 1994)
- Children: 3
- Father: Lewis Elton
- Relatives: Victor Ehrenberg (grandfather); Sir Geoffrey Elton (uncle); Dame Olivia Newton-John (third cousin); Victor Ehrenberg (great-great-uncle)

Benjamin Charles Elton (born 3 May 1959) is a British comedian and writer. He has written and produced for television, radio, films, novels, theatre and musicals, and has performed as a stand-up comedian and on screen. One of the major figures in the alternative comedy movement of the 1980s, he used a style of left-wing political satire in his early stand-up comedy.

Elton co-wrote the sitcoms The Young Ones, Blackadder and Mr. Bean, and was the sole writer for other sitcoms such as Filthy, Rich & Catflap, The Thin Blue Line and Upstart Crow. As of 2025, he has published sixteen novels in dystopian, comedy, and crime genres, and an autobiography. He wrote the stage musicals The Beautiful Game (2000), We Will Rock You (2002), Tonight's the Night (2003), and Love Never Dies (2010).

== Early life and education ==
Benjamin Charles Elton was born at University College Hospital in Fitzrovia, London, the son of Mary (née Foster), an English teacher from Cheshire, and physicist and educational researcher Lewis Elton. He is a nephew of the historian Geoffrey Elton and a third cousin of singer Olivia Newton-John. Elton's father is from a German-Jewish family and Elton's mother, who was raised in the Church of England, is of British background. Elton was raised in a non-religious home.

Elton grew up in Catford, South London, before moving with his family to Guildford in Surrey in 1968, where he became involved in amateur dramatics groups. Reflecting on those times at an event in Guildford in 2013, Elton said:

I started with the Curtain Raisers in Onslow Village. Yes, we did Peter Pan in 1969 and mum persuaded me to go along to the audition. For me it was literally an Epiphany. My road to Damascus was Friar's Gate. I had an absolute revelation. I loved the theatre and I knew I wanted to be involved in story telling and the public arts. From that moment onwards I was completely hooked.

Elton studied at Stillness Junior School and Godalming Grammar School in Surrey, before leaving home at the age of 16 to study theatre at South Warwickshire College in Stratford-upon-Avon, where he took and passed A-levels in English, History and Theatre Studies. In 1977, he went to study drama at the Victoria University of Manchester (now part of the University of Manchester), where he met Rik Mayall and Adrian Edmondson, and in 1980 he graduated with upper second-class honours.

== Career ==
=== Television ===
Upon university graduation in 1980, Elton joined the BBC and became their youngest ever scriptwriter. His first television appearance came in 1981 as a stand-up performer on the BBC1 youth and music programme Oxford Road Show. His first TV success, at 23, came as co-writer of the television sitcom The Young Ones, in which he occasionally appeared.

In 1983/84, Elton wrote and appeared in Granada Television's sketch show Alfresco, which was also notable for early appearances by Stephen Fry, Hugh Laurie, Emma Thompson and Robbie Coltrane. In 1985, Elton produced his first solo script for the BBC with his comedy-drama series Happy Families, starring Jennifer Saunders and Adrian Edmondson. Elton appeared in the fifth episode as a liberal prison governor. Shortly afterwards, he reunited Rik Mayall and Edmondson with their Young Ones co-star Nigel Planer for the showbiz send-up sitcom Filthy, Rich & Catflap.

In 1985, Elton began his writing partnership with Richard Curtis. Together they wrote Blackadder II, Blackadder the Third, Blackadder Goes Forth, and a failed sitcom pilot for Madness. Blackadder, starring Rowan Atkinson, was a worldwide hit, winning four BAFTAs and an Emmy.

Elton and Curtis were inspired to write Blackadder Goes Forth upon finding World War I to be apt for a situation comedy. This series, which dealt with greater, darker themes than prior Blackadder episodes, was praised for Curtis's and Elton's scripts, in particular the final episode. Before writing the series, the pair read about the war and found that:

All the lead up to the first World War was very funny. All the people coming from communities where they'd never bumped into posh people and all being so gung ho and optimistic. The first hundred pages of any book about the world war are hilarious, then of course everybody dies.

Elton and Curtis also wrote Atkinson's 1986 stage show The New Revue, and Mr. Bean's "exam" episode.

Elton became a stand-up comedian primarily to showcase his own writing, but became one of Britain's biggest live comedy acts. After a regular slot on Saturday Live – later moved and renamed Friday Night Live – which was seen as a UK version of the US's Saturday Night Live, he became the host of the programme.

In 1990, Elton starred in his own stand-up comedy and sketch series, Ben Elton: The Man from Auntie, which had a second series in 1994. (The title plays on The Man from UNCLE: "Auntie" is a nickname for the BBC.) In 1989 Elton won the Royal Television Society Writers' Award.

Elton wrote and produced The Thin Blue Line, a studio-based sitcom set in a police station, also starring Rowan Atkinson, which ran for two series in 1995 and 1996. A prime-time family show with traditional format and characters, it won the 1995 British Comedy Award and both the public and professional Jury Awards at Reims.

The Ben Elton Show (1998) followed a format similar to The Man from Auntie and featured Ronnie Corbett, a comedian of the old guard that the "alternative comedians" of the 1980s were the direct alternative to, as a regular guest. It was Elton's last high-profile network programme in the UK as a stand-up comedian.

Elton wrote the six-part sitcom Blessed, starring Ardal O'Hanlon as a record producer, first broadcast on BBC1 in 2005. No further series was commissioned.

In April 2007, Get a Grip, a new show, began on ITV1. Featuring comic sketches similar to those on The Ben Elton Show and staged studio discussion between Elton and 23-year-old Alexa Chung, the show's aim was to "contrast Elton's middle-aged viewpoint with Chung's younger perspective" (although Elton was responsible for the scripts).

In 2008, Elton accused the BBC of allowing jokes about vicars but not imams. "And I believe that part of it is due to the genuine fear that the authorities and the communities have about provoking the radical elements of Islam".

On 10 October 2010, Elton headlined the first episode of Dave's One Night Stand.

Elton worked on Ben Elton Live From Planet Earth, a live one-hour comedy show which debuted on 8 February 2011 on the Nine Network in Australia. Live from Planet Earth was axed by the Nine Network on Wednesday 23 February 2011 after three episodes, despite having six commissioned. The show's final airing rated 200,000 viewers.

In 2012, The Wright Way, a new sitcom for BBC1 was commissioned, written and produced by Elton and starring David Haig. Filming for a full six-part series of the sitcom (earlier titled Slings and Arrows) was completed in late February 2013. It debuted in April 2013 to negative reviews.

In 2016, Elton wrote the sitcom Upstart Crow, parodying the writing and family life of William Shakespeare, and starring David Mitchell as Shakespeare. This programme ran for a second series in 2017, and a third series in 2018. A Christmas Special was aired on 21 December 2020.

In June 2023, Elton presented Ben Elton: The Great Railway Disaster, a Channel 4 documentary about rail privatisation.

Elton returned to live British television on Channel 4 on 21 October 2022 as "Ringmaster"/host of a revival of Friday Night Live, celebrating the 40th anniversary of the founding of Channel 4 and as part of their Truth and Dare season. On the day of the broadcast, Elton admitted that because of the fluid British political situation, "I honestly haven't written the first five minutes yet!"

=== Radio ===
Elton starred with Adrian Edmondson in a sitcom based on the song "Teenage Kicks" for BBC Radio 2. A television version of Teenage Kicks for ITV has been made; Elton appeared in the pilot but was replaced by Mark Arden when it went to series production.

=== Novels ===
- Stark (1989)
- Gridlock (1991)
- This Other Eden (1993)
- Popcorn (1996)
- Blast from the Past (1998)
- Inconceivable (1999)
- Dead Famous (2001)
- High Society (2002)
- Past Mortem (2004)
- The First Casualty (2005)
- Chart Throb (2006)
- Blind Faith (2007)
- Meltdown (2010)
- Two Brothers (2012)
- Time and Time Again (2014)
- Identity Crisis (2019)

==== Autobiography ====
- What Have I Done? (2025)

=== Films ===
Elton appeared in amateur dramatic productions as a youth, notably as The Artful Dodger in the musical Oliver!

While in bit parts in his own television series, Elton began professional film acting as CD in Stark, the Australian/BBC TV series adaptation of his novel, in 1993. This was directed by Nadia Tass and filmed in Australia.

Elton played Verges in Kenneth Branagh's film adaptation of William Shakespeare's Much Ado About Nothing, also in 1993.

==== Writing and directing ====
Elton wrote and directed the film adaptation of his novel Inconceivable, under the title Maybe Baby (2000) starring Hugh Laurie and Joely Richardson. It was a moderate UK success and distributed globally. The film was also nominated for a prize at Germany's Emden Film Festival.

In 2015, Elton wrote a song for The Wiggles for the Wiggle Town DVD and CD: The Wonder of Wiggle Town.

Elton, interviewed in 2026 at Perth Film Studios by Sam Longley, who played Bob in Three Summers

Three Summers, a romantic comedy film written and directed by Elton, and filmed in Western Australia, was released in 2017.

Elton wrote All is True, released 2018, a speculative story of William Shakespeare's years in Stratford-upon-Avon after his retirement from the theatre and move from London. Along with the filmcraft and acting, returning to collaboration with Kenneth Branagh, All is True shows Elton giving a more serious and biographical perspective to some of the same characters who appear in Upstart Crow.

=== Musicals ===
Elton collaborated with Andrew Lloyd Webber on The Beautiful Game in 2000, writing the book and lyrics (Lloyd Webber wrote the music). The Beautiful Game won the London Critics Circle Award for best new musical.

He went on to write compilation shows featuring popular songs from the catalogues of pop/rock artists. The first was the musical We Will Rock You with music by Queen. Despite unfavourable early reaction, this was successful in the West End and won the 2003 Theatregoers' Choice Award for Best New Musical. It has since opened in the US, Australia, Russia, Spain, South Africa, Japan, Germany, Switzerland, Sweden, Canada, and The Netherlands. Elton also directed the 10th Anniversary Arena tour, in 2013. The musical ran for 12 years in London. The character of Pop was originally played by Elton's The Young Ones, co-star, Nigel Planer.

His second compilation musical was Tonight's the Night, based on the songs of Rod Stewart, which opened in London's West End in November 2003.

Elton worked with Lloyd Webber on the musical Love Never Dies, which opened in London's West End in 2010. It was the sequel to Lloyd Webber's The Phantom of the Opera (1986).

Elton directed a new 20th anniversary tour of We Will Rock You, that opened in February 2022 and visited more than 25 cities in the United Kingdom. He was scheduled to, make his theatre debut as the Rebel Leader (previously known as Pop) in a production of the show in 2023 at the London Coliseum from 2 June to 27 August. The 3 main cast members from the touring production will also be starring.

Elton wrote and directed Twiggy The Musical, a jukebox musical based on the life of Twiggy, which had its world premiere at the Menier Chocolate Factory, London in September 2023 (originally titled Close-Up: The Twiggy Musical) and will tour the UK from September 2025.

=== Plays ===
Elton has written five West End plays.

- Gasping (1990) was first performed at the Theatre Royal Haymarket, London. It starred Hugh Laurie and featured the voice of Stephen Fry.
- Silly Cow (1991) again at the Theatre Royal Haymarket, London. It was written for and starred Dawn French.
- Popcorn (1996) was adapted for the stage and went on a UK tour. It also toured Australia in a production starring Marcus Graham and Nadine Garner in its Eastern-States seasons. Popcorn won the TMA Barclays Theatre Award for new play and the Olivier Award for comedy. The Paris production of Popcorn ran for a year and was nominated for seven Molière awards.
- Blast From the Past (1998) was also adapted for the stage and was produced at the West Yorkshire Playhouse.
- The Upstart Crow, like the TV series Upstart Crow, a comic version of William Shakespeare's life and society, and sharing some of the same actors and characters, opened in London on 7 February 2020. Starring David Mitchell as Shakespeare and Gemma Whelan as Kate, the play was intended to run until 25 April 2020, but only ran up to mid-March, with the remainder cancelled as a result of restrictions put in place due to the COVID-19 pandemic. The play reopened in the West End at the Apollo Theatre for a ten-week season from 23 September until 3 December 2022.

=== Stand-up comedy ===
In 1981, Elton was hired by The Comedy Store in London as compère.

He made two albums of comedy, Motormouth (1987) and Motorvation (1988).

In 2005, Elton toured for the first time since 1997, touring the UK with Get a Grip. He toured Australia and New Zealand with the same show in 2006.

In September 2019, Elton embarked on a three-month UK stand-up tour, his first tour since 2005.

The New Zealand leg of the tour was interrupted in February 2020 by the COVID-19 pandemic. He resumed it over a year later once trans-Tasman quarantine-free travel was launched.

In 2022, his sell-out UK stand-up final show was held at the Palace Theatre Southend. It was filmed for broadcast on free to air, Channel 4.

His stand-up tour "Authentic Stupidity" toured the UK, Ireland, Australia and New Zealand in 2024 and 2025, touching on themes of AI and generational shifts.

== Recognition and awards ==
=== Personal honours ===
Elton received an honorary doctorate in 2004 from the University of Manchester.

In 2007, he was awarded an Honorary Rose for lifetime achievement at the Rose d'Or festival, and was also made a Companion of the Liverpool Institute for Performing Arts, in recognition of his work with students.

In September 2016, Elton was bestowed with a Doctor of Arts honoris causa by Edith Cowan University in Perth.

In June 2023, he was made a Member of the Order of Australia (AM), for "significant service to the entertainment industry as a comedian, actor, writer and director".

=== Awards for works ===
Elton has won three BAFTAs for Best Comedy Series, for The Young Ones, Blackadder the Third and Blackadder Goes Forth. Popcorn and We Will Rock You each won an Olivier Award and The Beautiful Game was awarded the Best Musical at the Critics' Circle Awards. The Man From Auntie won him a Royal Television Society Writer's Award and The Thin Blue Line won a British Comedy Award as well as Jury Award at Reims. The 2022 revival of Channel 4's Friday Night Live won a Royal Television Society Award and BAFTA for Best Comedy Entertainment programme.

His books have won the Crime Writers Association Gold Dagger Award for Crime Fiction (Popcorn), the Swedish Kaliber Award (Popcorn), WH Smiths People's Choice Fiction Award (High Society) and Prix Polar International Crime Writer Award (Amitiès Mortelles for Past Mortem, French edition).

== Personal life ==
Elton is atheist.

Elton first met Australian bass player Sophie Gare in 1986 while working in Melbourne. A year later in Edinburgh, a newly-single Elton rekindled their friendship and they became a couple. The two married in 1994 and have three children. They settled in North Fremantle, near Perth in Western Australia, while maintaining a home in East Sussex, England. Elton holds dual British/Australian citizenship, the latter since 2004. In 2014 he speculated on a future move back to London when their children have completed their schooling.

Elton has been nominated twice for the television series Room 101, first by broadcaster Anne Robinson in 2001, and secondly by comedian Mark Steel.

=== Political views ===
Elton champions left-wing politics. Prior to the 1987 general election, he supported Red Wedge by participating in a comedy tour organised by the campaign.

Elton was a Labour Party supporter and was one of the party's biggest private financial donors in 1998. He subsequently distanced himself from the party under Tony Blair, although in April 2015, he stated he was "back with Labour" for the general election.

Responding to criticism for writing a musical with Conservative Party supporter Andrew Lloyd Webber, Elton said: "If I were to refuse to talk to Tories, I would narrow my social and professional scope considerably. If you judge all your relationships on a person's voting intentions, I think you miss out on the varieties of life." He added, "I would have loved a honeymoon period, but I've been irritating journos from the beginning. Originally I was knocked for being too left-wing, and now apparently I've sold out and I'm too right-wing, but all the time I've been being me, and that certainly isn't the person I recognise in anything that's written about me." He has denied being anti-establishment. He also said he was a socialist at a time when "the media was on the whole slavishly worshipping of Thatcher". He said, "I believe in the politics of Clement Attlee. I'm a welfare state Labour voter."

Elton parodied himself in the sketch "Benny Elton" for Harry Enfield and Chums in 1994, using the style of Benny Hill to send up Elton's "right on" socialist image as a politically correct spoilsport, chasing Page 3 models around a park to chastise them and tricking heterosexual couples into becoming homosexual.

Elton is a supporter of the Australian Labor Party. In 2013, he was involved in a fundraiser for Fremantle MP Melissa Parke in 2013. Elton strongly supported the Online Safety Amendment (Social Media Minimum Age) Act 2024, as "a wonderful, brave decision by the current government to tackle the curse of social media depriving young people of their childhood," claiming he was "proud, as an Australian, that our government, uniquely in the world, has had the guts to stand up to the tech bros and say we will not let children's imaginations be stolen on our watch". In 2024, he performed a preview of his Authentic Stupidity show and donated all its proceeds to the Western Australian Labor Party for Fremantle re-election campaigns, which totalled out to a sum of thirty-tree thousand dollars.

Elton was a vocal critic of Prime Minister of Australia Scott Morrison, calling him a "grossly entitled middle-aged white m[a]n," "motivated by personal ambition." He accused him of lacking "political principle" and possessing a "strange conservative evangelicalism that makes him anti-environment." Elton regarded Morrison's response to Brittany Higgins' rape allegations as a display of manufactured empathy, commenting "how can he be so tone deaf as to feel he needs to refer to his wife and daughters?"
