= Blind Faith (novel) =

2007 dystopian novel by Ben Elton

- First edition cover
- Author: Ben Elton
- Language: English
- Genre: Dark comedy, satire, dystopian novel
- Publisher: Bantam Press
- Publication date: 5 November 2007
- Publication place: United Kingdom
- Media type: Print (hardback and paperback)
- Pages: 320 pp (first edition, hardback)
- ISBN: 978-0-593-05800-8 (first edition, hardback)
- OCLC: 163321153
- Preceded by: Chart Throb (2006)
- Followed by: Meltdown (2010)

Blind Faith is an English dystopian novel by writer and comedian Ben Elton, published in 2007.

== Setting ==
The story takes place in London approximately 100 years after many parts of the Earth have been subjected to rising water due to global warming, which happen in 2029. The remaining population believes that "only perverts do things in private", and obsessively blogs and uploads their lives in a sort of voluntary panopticon society. A wholesale rejection of science (which is blamed for "The Second Flood") has taken place, and religious faith is compulsory under new "Wembley Laws" (statutes passed by mob assent).

== Plot summary ==
Trafford Sewell, the novel's protagonist, sets off for work on a rare "Fizzy Coff", a rare day that he must be physically present in his office as he is predominately a remote worker, and, in the short distance he has to travel, he is confronted by the numerous maudlin "tributes" to dead "kiddies", massive overcrowding, and oppressive heat that are typical of his world. His "Confessor", Bailey, confronts him about his lateness in posting an explicit video of Trafford's newborn daughter Caitlin Happymeal, being born on the "WorldTube". Trafford's given excuse is forgetfulness, rather than the illegal desire for privacy that is his true reason.

A "Fizzy Coff" colleague, Cassius, begins to take an interest in Trafford and invites him to lunch at an "old-fashioned" falafel restaurant. There he tells Trafford that he is a "Vaccinator" who belongs to the "Humanist" group. This group believes in reason and science, opposing the Temple's message of blind faith. Having already lost an earlier child to a "plague" as all epidemics are called, Trafford tries to find a way to get Caitlin Happymeal vaccinated. Trafford's wife, Chantorria, is a devout Temple member and is against the idea. Trafford ignores her wishes and secretly gives Caitlin a MMR vaccine against measles, mumps, and tetanus.

Vaccination is banned under the "Wembley Laws" as interference in "God's will" and as a result, half of all children born die of preventable diseases such as measles, mumps, rubella and tetanus.

When a measles epidemic comes to London, thousands of children die, including all the children in the Trafford's apartment building, but Caitlin Happymeal survives. Chantorria is aware of the fact that Caitlin Happymeal has been vaccinated, but rather than accepting this cause and effect, she sees Caitlin Happymeal's survival as God's will. The Sewells become stars in their local community and Chantorria becomes the centre of attention, which she relishes. She gradually becomes convinced that she is one of God's chosen few and begins an affair with Confessor Bailey.

During this time, Trafford has fallen in love with Sandra Dee, another "Fizzy Coff" colleague. He has been "Goog'ing" her and discovers that the videos that she "tubes" are not of her and her blog entries have been lifted wholesale from other people's blogs. This fascinates Trafford as he sees a kindred spirit in her: someone else who values privacy in a world where everything is made public. Trafford introduces Sandra Dee to the books that Cassius has lent him from the Humanist group's library. The relationship between the pair develops.

The Sewells' world is then shattered by the death of Caitlin Happymeal due to a cholera epidemic, a disease against which she was not vaccinated. Chantorria becomes angry, telling Trafford that Caitlin's death is a punishment from God for his heresy in having her vaccinated at all. They are rejected by their community and arrested by the Temple and are tortured into implicating others. Chantorria accepts the torture as her "just punishment". As Trafford finally breaks and implicates Cassius, the Inquisitor tells him that they already knew everything, the torture was simply to test his endurance.

In his cell, Trafford is visited by Sandra Dee, who turns out to be an undercover police officer, and the reason that the Temple knows all about the Humanists. She tries to recruit Trafford. He refuses and he and Chantorria are taken to the stake to be burned as heretics.

On his personal PC, Trafford has set up an email bomb (containing a précis of the Theory of Evolution) which he tricks Sandra Dee into releasing under the pretense that it contains a love-letter from him to her. When being tied to the stake, Trafford notices a girl waving an Ev Love ("evolve" backwards) banner, showing that she received the e-mail. He goes to his death in hope of a better world, reasoning that a society which promotes ignorance over knowledge and values mediocrity will inevitably die out and "evolve" into one that values knowledge and excellence.

== Critical reception ==
"...this novel is too in your face, too ambitious and ultimately too obvious to be very funny, or actually very original. However, it will still sell shed-loads." – Henry Sutton, The Independent, 11 November 2007

"As post-apocalyptic futures go, this is pretty tame. There's no denying that Ben Elton can tell a good story but this one isn’t fleshed out enough..." – Angela Cook, Daily Express, 16 November 2007

"Funny as it is, it's an extremely disturbing book and readers are advised not to go anywhere crowded or to any fast-food outlet or beach for at least 24 hours after finishing it." – Kerryn Goldsworthy, The Sydney Morning Herald, 28 December 2007
