= Bomolochus =

Theatrical stock character in ancient Greece

In the theatre of ancient Greece, the bômolochus (Ancient Greek: βωμολόχος) was one of three stock characters in comedy, corresponding to the English buffoon. The bômolochus is marked by his wit, his crudity of language, and his frequent non-illusory audience address.

In modern Greek, the word refers to a foul-mouthed person.

== See also ==
- Alazôn
- Eirôn

== Sources ==
- Carlson, Marvin. 1993. Theories of the Theatre: A Historical and Critical Survey from the Greeks to the Present. Expanded ed. Ithaca and London: Cornell University Press. ISBN 978-0-8014-8154-3
- Frye, Northrop. 1957. Anatomy of Criticism: Four Essays. London: Penguin, 1990. ISBN 0-14-012480-2
- Janko, Richard, trans. 1987. Poetics with Tractatus Coislinianus, Reconstruction of Poetics II and the Fragments of the On Poets. By Aristotle. Cambridge: Hackett. ISBN 0-87220-033-7
