= Inconceivable (novel) =

1999 novel by Ben Elton

- First Edition (1999)
- Author: Ben Elton
- Language: English
- Genre: Comedy Novel
- Publisher: Bantam Press
- Publication date: 1 October 1999
- Publication place: United Kingdom
- Media type: Print (Paperback)
- Preceded by: Blast from the Past (1998)
- Followed by: Dead Famous (2001)

Inconceivable is a novel by Ben Elton which was published in October 1999, following one childless couple's efforts to conceive. The story is told in the form of journal entries by the two principal characters. It was adapted into the film Maybe Baby which was also directed by Elton, and which was released in June 2000. Filming commenced in the summer of 1999, with it being announced in June 1999.
