= The First Casualty =

2005 historical crime novel by Ben Elton

- First edition
- Author: Ben Elton
- Language: English
- Genre: historical, crime, murder mystery
- Publisher: Bantam Press
- Publication date: 2005
- Publication place: United Kingdom
- Media type: Print (hardback)
- ISBN: 0-593-05111-4
- OCLC: 61440828
- Preceded by: Past Mortem (2004)
- Followed by: Chart Throb (2006)

The First Casualty (2005) is a historical crime novel by English author Ben Elton, set during the First World War.

== Synopsis ==
In June 1917, whilst recovering from shell shock inside a military hospital, beloved war poet and dedicated soldier Viscount Abercrombie is inexplicably shot dead. Meanwhile, Douglas Kingsley, a liberal Inspector for Scotland Yard, has refused national service because he considers the war to be an affront to his highly prized sense of logic. As a result, he's hauled before a judge, branded a coward by those who love him - including his wife Agnes - and thrown into prison, where his fellow inmates routinely assault him, taking revenge for him putting them behind bars in the first place. However, the Home Office gives the disgraced Inspector a chance for redemption when it abducts him from his cell, fakes his death and orders him to investigate the Viscount's death behind the lines at Flanders.

As he begins his reluctant inquiries, encumbered by the presence of his psychopathic minder Captain Shannon, Kingsley discovers that not only was Abercrombie a homosexual, but that he had also become disillusioned with the war and was composing poetry to this effect before his untimely death.

== Reception ==
The novel was generally very well received by critics, although questions were raised regarding the historical accuracy of some details. The Daily Telegraph described it as a "work of formidable imaginative scope... the writing is so good, the language so surprisingly subtle and the characters so beautifully delineated."

== Characters ==
- Inspector Kingsley - A vaguely arrogant, but nevertheless kind and morally upstanding, intellectual, whose intricate sense of logic is frequently given superiority over self-preservation, a trait which proves his undoing. His brother Robert was killed in battle and he must now face the prospect of losing his wife, Agnes, and young son George. Despite his objection to the war, he is also a talented soldier, as proven when he wades into the middle of no man's land during a fray in order to obtain information.
- Captain Shannon - An unbalanced, sadistic psychopath whose warped mentality has clearly been exacerbated by his experiences of war. He is deeply misogynistic, but has no trouble attracting women because of his handsome face and surface charm. Kingsley narrowly prevents him from raping a teenage girl, and throughout the story Shannon displays a cold disregard for women, civilians, conscientious objectors and victims of shell shock.
- Nurse Murray - A staunch feminist and former suffragette, who abandoned her cause following the outbreak of war so she could lend her support to the military. She has a brief but passionate affair with Kingsley, who is both enamoured of and horrified by her unashamed vulgarity.
- Agnes Kingsley
- Viscount Abercrombie - The character of the Viscount Abercrombie may be based, at least in part, upon Siegfried Sassoon, a British soldier and poet who became disillusioned with the War and became an outspoken anti-war activist.
- Stamford
