= Past Mortem =

Novel by Ben Elton

- First edition cover
- Author: Ben Elton
- Language: English
- Genre: Crime novel
- Publisher: Bantam Books
- Publication date: 2004
- Publication place: United Kingdom
- Media type: Print (Hardcover) & (Paperback)
- Pages: 359 pp (hardcover edition) & 372 pp (paperback edition)
- ISBN: 0-593-05095-9 (hardcover) & ISBN 0-593-05096-7 (paperback)
- OCLC: 58976435
- Preceded by: High Society (2002)
- Followed by: The First Casualty (2005)

Past Mortem is a detective novel by Ben Elton first published in 2004. It is about a serial killer on the loose in England, mainly in the London area, and Scotland Yard's attempts at tracking him or her down. At the same time, Past Mortem raises a number of sociological, psychological and moral questions such as bullying, revenge, "getting a life" versus living in the past, domestic violence, and the changing market value of people as they get older. Apart from its serious aspects, the book also contains a lot of humour, especially when the respective private entanglements of Detective Inspector Edward Newson, the officer in charge of the police investigation, and his assistant, Detective Sergeant Natasha Wilkie, are described. However, as one critic put it, "some of the descriptions of the sex scenes might prove a bit much for the faint-hearted".

== Plot summary ==
When Adam Bishop, a middle-aged self-made man in the building trade, is cruelly murdered at his London home, Detective Inspector Ed Newson has a hunch that the crime has been committed by a psychopath who has killed before. He links up the new case with a number of older, unsolved ones, and a certain pattern emerges: It turns out that each victim was a bully many years ago when they went to school, and that they have now been killed in exactly the same way as they used to torture their peers. However, when Newson and Sergeant Natasha Wilkie talk to the former victims they soon find out that none of them could be the serial killer.

Although successful in his job, when it comes to his private life Edward Newson is a lonely, sex-starved man secretly in love with his assistant, Natasha. Now in his mid-thirties, he nostalgically looks back at his school days and the two girls with whom he was romantically involved when they were all 14—Helen Smart, the leftist intellectual, and Christine Copperfield, the "golden girl". Newson cannot resist the temptation and logs on to Friends Reunited. To his surprise, more of his former classmates than he would have thought are also online, and soon a class reunion is being organised—by Christine Copperfield, of all people.

This is the point where Newson's private life collides with his murder investigation. The serial killer uses the same web site—Friends Reunited—as the source of his knowledge about instances of bullying that happened decades ago. When Helen Smart posts a long account of how back at school she was forced by Christine Copperfield to stuff a tampon down her throat the murderer is supplied with one more story on which he or she might act. Christine Copperfield dies with a tampon stuffed down her throat.

In the tradition of the whodunnit, while new murders are committed, the identity of the killer remains unknown until the final pages of the novel.

== Critical reception ==
Jane Jakeman of The Independent said the book has "an obvious solution" and criticized the sexual aspects of the storyline saying that "Elton relentlessly exploits every crude possibility". Stephanie Merritt of The Observer called the book "engaging and smartly plotted" but felt the book has "potential to date quickly". Adam Lively of The Times praised the "warm-hearted characterisation" calling the lead character, Ed Newson, "engagingly characterised" but did feel it has a "predictable outcome".
