= Two Brothers (novel) =

2012 British novel by Ben Elton

- Author: Ben Elton
- Language: English
- Publication date: 2012

Two Brothers is a 2012 historical fiction novel by British writer and comedian Ben Elton. The story follows Otto and Paulus Stengel, two boys born on the same day in Germany. One to a Jewish family, and the other adopted into the same household that very same day.
