= Maybe Baby (film) =

- US Theatrical release poster
- Directed by: Ben Elton
- Written by: Ben Elton
- Based on: Inconceivable by Ben Elton
- Produced by: Phil McIntyre
- Starring: Hugh Laurie; Joely Richardson; Adrian Lester; James Purefoy; Tom Hollander; Joanna Lumley; Rowan Atkinson; Emma Thompson; Dawn French
- Cinematography: Roger Lanser
- Edited by: Peter Hollywood
- Music by: Colin Towns
- Production companies: Pandora; BBC Films
- Distributed by: Redbus Film Distribution
- Release date: 2 June 2000 (United Kingdom)
- Running time: 104 minutes
- Country: United Kingdom
- Language: English
- Box office: $173,763

Maybe Baby (released in the Philippines as Sex Bomb) is a 2000 British comedy film starring Hugh Laurie and Joely Richardson. It marks the second time Laurie and Richardson have starred in the same film; the first was 101 Dalmatians (although in that film they shared no scenes). It was written and directed by Ben Elton, with Laurie directing some scenes in an uncredited role, and based upon Elton's 1999 novel, Inconceivable.

Receiving a mixed critical reaction, the film did poorly at the box office, despite a cast including many of the best-known names within comedy in Britain.

== Plot ==
Sam Bell and his wife Lucy are struggling for a baby, having tried everything they can think of to improve their chances of conceiving. At the same time, Sam begins to find his job (as a commissioning editor of drama at the BBC) increasingly unfulfilling. While he resolves to write his own screenplay, he begins to suffer writer's block.

The idea dawns upon him to write about his own predicament, something to which Lucy objects strongly. He uses her diary entries to help him achieve authenticity, and the film is a success. Lucy finds out about the film and, shocked, leaves Sam. Eventually they reconcile, and at the end of the story are still trying for a baby.

== Cast ==
- Hugh Laurie as Sam Bell
- Joely Richardson as Lucy Bell
- Matthew Macfadyen as Nigel
- Adrian Lester as George
- Yasmin Bannerman as Melinda
- Joanna Lumley as Sheila
- Rachael Stirling as Joanna
- Dave Thompson as Dave the Comedian
- Emma Thompson as Druscilla
- James Purefoy as Carl Phipps
- Tom Hollander as Ewan Proclaimer
- Rowan Atkinson as Mr. James
- Kelly Reilly as Nimnh
- Dawn French as Charlene

== Soundtrack ==
The title song "Maybe Baby" is performed by Paul McCartney and co-produced by McCartney and Jeff Lynne. "I Don't Wanna Fight", a song from Westlife's self-titled debut album, is played in the last part of the movie. Melanie C's song "Suddenly Monday" also appears on the soundtrack, alongside tracks by Roxy Music, Lene Marlin, Atomic Kitten, Elvis Costello and the Attractions, George Michael and Madness.

Laurie co-wrote and performed the humorous blues song "Sperm Test in the Morning".

== Release ==
Maybe Baby was released in the United Kingdom on 2 June 2000 on 290 screens. In the Philippines, the film was released as Sex Bomb on 20 September 2000.

=== Reception ===
Rotten Tomatoes reported a 46% approval rating, with an average rating of 5.1/10 based on 28 reviews. Metacritic calculated an average score of 46 out of 100 based on 11 reviews, indicating "mixed or average reviews".

It opened at number 3 in the United Kingdom with a gross of £801,542 in its opening weekend, behind Gladiator and Final Destination.
