= Eiron =

Stock character in Ancient Greek comedy

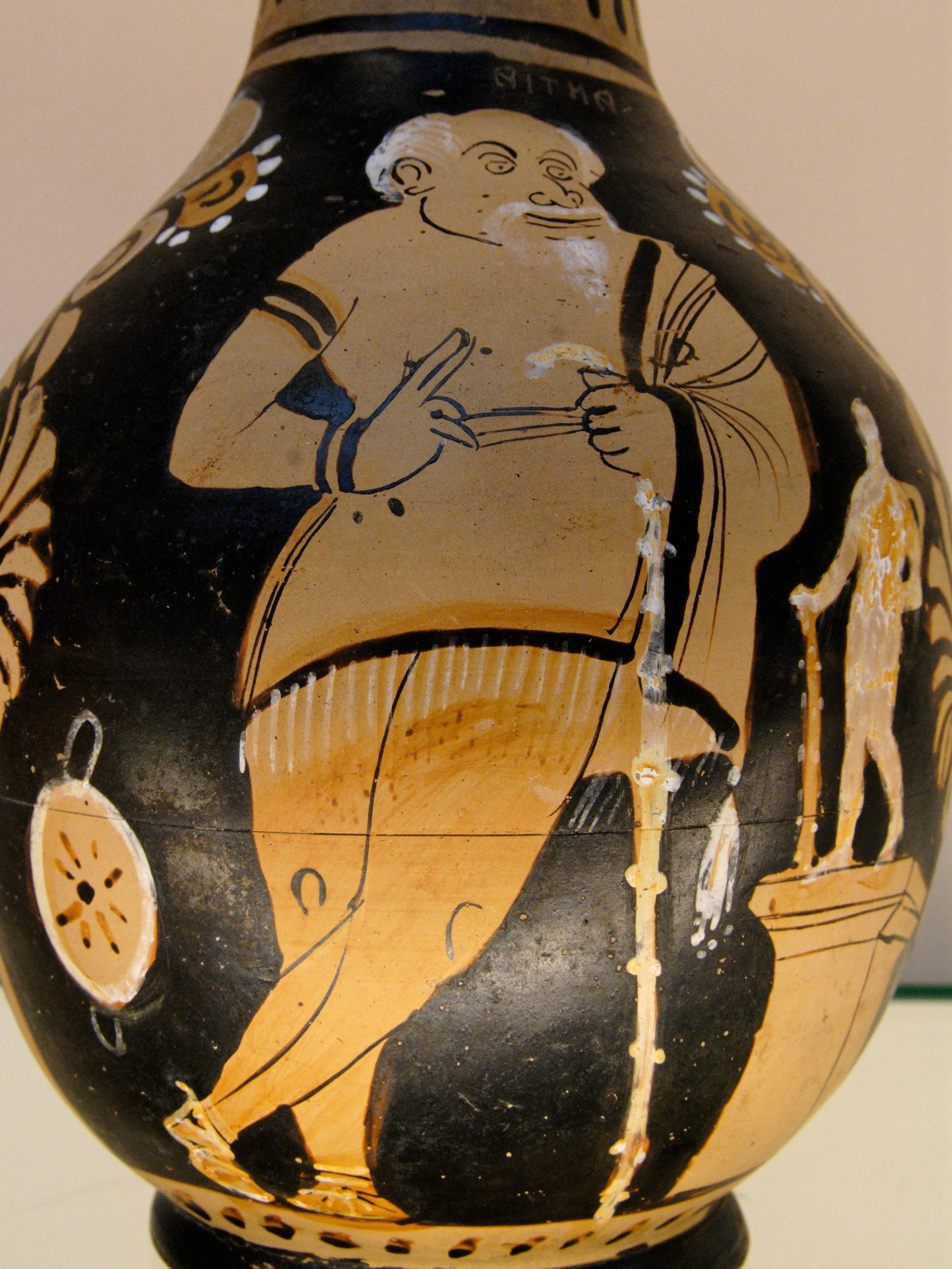
An actor dressed as the eirōn character Xanthias in Aristophanes' The Frogs

In the theatre of ancient Greece, the eirōn (Ancient Greek: εἴρων, “dissembler”) was one of various stock characters in comedy. The eirōn usually succeeded by bringing down his braggart opponent (the alazṓn "boaster") by understating his own abilities. The eiron lends his name to the related concept of irony.

== History ==
The eirōn developed in Greek Old Comedy and can be found in many of Aristophanes' plays. For example, in The Frogs, after the God Dionysus claims to have sunk 12 or 13 enemy ships with Cleisthenes (son of Sibyrtius), his slave Xanthias says "Then I woke up."

The philosopher Aristotle mentions the eirôn in his Nicomachean Ethics, where he says: "in the form of understatement, self-deprecation, and its possessor the self-deprecator" (1108a12). In this passage, Aristotle establishes the eirōn as one of the main characters of comedy, along with the alazōn.

=== Irony ===
The modern term irony is derived from the eirōn of the classical Greek theatre. Irony entails opposition (not mere difference) between the actual meaning and the apparent meaning of something.

== See also ==
- Bômolochus
- Maieutics

== Sources ==
- Abrams, M. H., ed. 1993. A Glossary of Literary Terms. 6th ed. Fort Worth: Harcourt Brace College.
- Carlson, Marvin. 1993. Theories of the Theatre: A Historical and Critical Survey from the Greeks to the Present. Expanded ed. Ithaca and London: Cornell University Press. ISBN 978-0-8014-8154-3.
- Frye, Northrop. 1957. Anatomy of Criticism: Four Essays. London: Penguin, 1990. ISBN 0-14-012480-2.
- Janko, Richard, trans. 1987. Poetics with Tractatus Coislinianus, Reconstruction of Poetics II and the Fragments of the On Poets. By Aristotle. Cambridge: Hackett. ISBN 0-87220-033-7.
