= Blast from the Past (novel) =

1998 novel by Ben Elton

- First edition
- Author: Ben Elton
- Language: English
- Genre: Thriller
- Publisher: Bantam Press (UK); Delacorte Press (US)
- Publication date: 3 September 1998 (UK); 7 September 1999 (US)
- Publication place: United Kingdom
- Media type: Print (Hardback & Paperback)
- Pages: 304 pp
- ISBN: 0-593-04414-2
- OCLC: 40564144
- Preceded by: Popcorn (1996),
- Followed by: Inconceivable (1999)

Blast from the Past is a 1998 novel by Ben Elton, published by Bantam Press and later adapted into a stage performance by the West Yorkshire Playhouse. The plot centres on Polly Slade, an ordinary woman with a highly unusual past, whose world is thrown into turmoil when the two men in her life show up at her front door in the middle of the night: Jack, a general in the United States Army with whom she had a short-lived affair as a teenager and Peter, an obsessive stalker who has been terrifying her for the past two years. Themes of the novel include obsession, rape, the morality of war, gender politics, and whether one can ever hope to return to the past and find that everything is just as one remembers it.

== Plot summary ==
Polly Slade is a 34-year-old woman with no money, no love life and a boring, run of the mill job at the local town council. She has attracted the obsessive attention of Peter, an ex-client, who continues to harass and threaten her in breach of several court orders she has brought out against him. The novel frequently changes perspective, and we see the depth of his obsession with her as he plots to come to her house late at night in a last-ditch attempt to prove his "love" to her.

Through a series of flashbacks, we investigate Polly's relationship with Jack Kent, a soldier who was once the youngest captain in the US Army. They had a short affair during the summer when Polly was seventeen years old. She was at that time an activist and saboteur living in a "peace camp" in the countryside, whom Jack met at a motorway service station while he was positioned in England with his work. The relationship ended when he took her to a hotel and then walked out on her as she slept, leaving her with no way of contacting him. Polly's memories of him are extremely bitter for this reason, and Jack, who is trapped in an unhappy marriage, finds he cannot escape Polly's influence over his life. He has risen to the rank of a general, partly with her assistance, as his memories of her have kept him from becoming involved in a number of scandals which could have ruined his career.

One night, Polly's phone rings in the small hours of the morning, and Jack unexpectedly announces his intention to come to visit her, despite the unsociable hour and the fact of them not having seen each other for sixteen years. Meanwhile, Peter is also making his way over to Polly's house, and he and Jack have a confrontation in a public phone booth. Jack arrives at Polly's house, and they spend several hours talking about the past, both memories of their relationship and details of Jack's life since he left her. They argue about politics; Jack is very right wing and something of a male chauvinist, whereas Polly is a pacifist and feminist. Polly's beliefs oppose everything he stands for, and he tells her that people like her are what has brought America to ruin.

When she complains that he cannot just reappear in her life after such a long absence, he comes to the point of his visit: he intends to kill her to prevent the details of his relationship with her becoming public. At the time they knew each other, Polly was an anarchist and below the legal age of consent for sex in America (at the time of their affair, Jack was stationed in England), and if Jack's involvement with her is found out, his career could be ruined. He is the top candidate to become the National Security Advisor and he has decided that nothing, not even the love of his life, can be allowed to stand in his way.

At this point Peter breaks into the house, having killed a milkman he initially mistook for Jack. As Jack is about to murder Polly, Peter bursts into the room, shouting a string of obscenities and threats. Jack shoots him dead, allowing Polly a chance to activate her alarm, alerting the police who arrive in minutes. Rather than have his history with Polly, and the murder of Peter, made public, Jack shoots himself. When his body is found, there is a major press scandal over his involvement with Polly and the details of his death, exactly what he feared would happen to him in life. Polly is now free of the terror of her stalker, but she has been left with nothing, and decides to rebuild her life. At the very end of the novel, she is visited by Jack's recently divorced brother, who feels he cannot hate her for what has happened and wants to know more about her and her relationship with Jack. As she lets him into the house, she is calm and feeling positive about the future, and she notices how like Jack he is but with one noticeable difference: his voice is "kinder, somehow".
