= The Twelve Idle Servants =

Folk tale
- Name: The Twelve Idle Servants
- Aarne–Thompson grouping: ATU 1950
- Country: Germany
- Published in: Grimms' Fairy Tales

"The Twelve Idle Servants" (German: Die zwölf faulen Knechte) is a fairy tale by The Brothers Grimm, published in Kinder- und Hausmärchen as KHM151a.

== Plot ==
The plot concerns twelve lazy servants who don't feel like working and instead boast about how lazy they are. Each one tells his story. The first one says he only takes care of himself and just eats, drinks and gets up late. The second goes so far that he ignores the fact that he has to take care of his master's horse, by simply claiming the animal has already eaten. The third servant once went to sleep in the sun and kept dreaming despite the fact that heavy rain suddenly came down and made a hole in his skull. The fourth servant claims he never starts quickly and always asks others to help him out. The fifth one only works one cart load a day.

The sixth servant boasts that he never changes clothes for three weeks and has no buckles on his shoes. He counts the stairs so that he knows when to take a rest. The seventh servant claims that he crawls, rather than walks, and that four men are needed to get him into motion. Once he fell asleep and had to be carried home, because he didn't wake up. The eighth servant doesn't lift his feet whenever he sees a rock on the road, but just lies down in front of it. When it rains he just keeps lying there until he is dry again. The ninth servant once nearly died from thirst because he was too lazy to reach for a loaf of bread in his vicinity. Even a jug with water was too heavy to lift, so he preferred to stay thirsty.

The tenth servant has a severed leg, because he was resting on the roadside when a vehicle ran over his legs. He hadn't heard it coming, because bugs were crawling through his mouth, nose and ears. The eleventh servant resigned from his job because he had to carry heavy books and his masters' clothes, which were already infested with moths because he never touched them. The twelfth servant once traveled by cart, but fell asleep during his trip, after which robbers stole everything without him doing anything about it.

== Sources ==
- Household Tales, by Brothers Grimm (chapter152)
