= Chart Throb =

2006 novel by Ben Elton

- First edition cover
- Author: Ben Elton
- Language: English
- Genre: Comic, Satirical novel
- Publisher: Bantam Press
- Publication date: 2006
- Publication place: United Kingdom
- Media type: Print (Hardback & Paperback) & AudioBook
- Pages: 427 pp
- ISBN: 978-0-593-05750-6
- OCLC: 225348435
- Preceded by: The First Casualty (2005)
- Followed by: Blind Faith (2007)

Chart Throb is a 2006 novel by Ben Elton. It was released in hardback on 6 November 2006 in the UK, and 9 January 2007 in the US. It is a satire of The X Factor/Pop Idol-style reality TV programmes.

== Plot summary ==
The story revolves around the occurrences during the latest series of the hit 'reality' star search programme, Chart Throb. The show was the brainchild of Calvin Simms, who assumed a Simon Cowell style role as the mean, English judge. He is accompanied by the extravagant but bitchy former rockstar-turned-transsexual reality TV star, Beryl Blenheim, and the ageing pop manager Rodney Root. Calvin's wife wants to divorce him, but as part of a bet she agrees that if he can rig the results of the new series of Chart Throb, she will leave him without taking any of his cash. Beryl Blenheim is trying to manage the scripted reality show she helms, The Blenheims, whilst coping with her drug-addled wife, Serenity, and the flagging pop career of one of her daughters, Priscilla. Meanwhile, Rodney is facing the challenge of judging his old flame, the beautiful Iona, whilst trying to revive some public interest in his life and work. All of these stories clash and reach a climax at the final of the TV series. At the end of the book, it is said that by the year 2050 everybody will be either a pop star or star of their own reality TV programme.

Chart Throb was the 11th novel by Ben Elton, and was released both in hardback and paperback.

== Mixed Reception ==
James Watson of The Daily Telegraph said Chart Throb would change readers' opinions of The X Factor. "Even so, it's difficult to imagine anybody who reads Chart Throb ever being able to enjoy The X Factor innocently again – which, as far as Elton is concerned, can only mean mission accomplished." while Bill Greenwell of The Independent said Elton's humor was hit and miss. "He can hit the mark: I did laugh at the parodies of judges' feedback ("You really owned that song"). But he's wasting paper ridiculing what is already utterly ridiculous."
