= Dead Famous (novel) =

2001 novel by Ben Elton

- First edition
- Author: Ben Elton
- Cover artist: Tony Stone
- Language: English
- Genre: Mystery, Comedy
- Publisher: Bantam Press
- Publication date: 2001
- Publication place: United Kingdom
- Media type: Paperback
- Pages: 384
- ISBN: 0-552-99945-8
- OCLC: 49394943
- Preceded by: Inconceivable (1999)
- Followed by: High Society (2002)

Dead Famous (2001) is a comedy/whodunit novel by Ben Elton in which ratings for a reality TV show, very similar to Big Brother, rocket when a housemate is murdered. Unlike a typical whodunnit, Elton does not reveal the identity of the victim until around halfway into the book.

The novel was first published by Bantam in the United Kingdom, and later by Black Swan in the United States.

== Plot ==
The novel is about a murder that occurs on a reality television programme called House Arrest, which is very similar to the program Big Brother, and the efforts of three police officers to identify the killer by watching all the video recordings of the ten housemates while the remaining housemates continue the reality television show. The novel jumps back and forth in time to show the events in the live video recordings, leading up to the night of the murder, where the remaining eight housemates at the time had to remain in an Indian sweat box—an old-style sauna with a pitch-black interior, the intention being to prompt the housemates to have sex. The victim left the box to go to the toilet and the killer apparently left the box wrapped in a sheet to conceal his or her identity and stabbed the victim twice in the neck and head.

Later, a note is found in an envelope that had been sealed weeks previously that says that the victim will be dead by the time the housemates read the note and that one of the three remaining housemates will be murdered. The police have to catch the killer before he or she strikes again.

The killer is revealed on the final night of the show to be the show's producer, who had set up the murder to attract increased ratings for the show, faking the video footage of the killer leaving the sweat-box with the aid of her deputy producer; Detective Coleridge, an amateur actor, provokes a confession by creating fake video evidence of the producer's rehearsal murders.

== Characters ==
The housemates:

- Dervla Nolan, a quiet and mysterious Irish trauma therapist (Revealed to have joined the show in an attempt to gain the prize money to help her family after a recent disaster in her home village)
- Garry "Gazzer", a stereotypical lager lout
- Kelly Simpson, a beautiful but unintelligent shop assistant; the murder victim
- David Dalgleish, a vain actor and secret porn star
- Layla, a snobbish fashion designer/shop assistant with "New Age" beliefs
- Hamish, an uninteresting doctor; who used a strategy of staying unnoticed in the house to avoid nomination while informing the public that he wanted to have sex on television to discourage them voting him out
- Sally Copple, a bodybuilding lesbian bouncer with a dark past
- William "Woggle" Wooster, an antisocial and unhygienic anarchist
- Moon, an exhibitionistic circus performer and topless model
- Jason "Jazz", an aspiring black standup comedian

The television crew:

- Geraldine Hennessy, the producer of House Arrest
- Bob Fogarty, the senior series editor
- Pru (Prudence), his assistant editor
- Larry Carlisle, a cameraman
- Chloe, the interviewer
- Andy, the narrator

The police:

- Chief Inspector Stanley Spencer Coleridge, an old-fashioned but dedicated police officer
- Sergeant Hooper (forename unknown), a young modern police officer
- Constable Patricia "Trish" (surname unknown), a closeted lesbian police officer

== Allusions and references ==
=== Allusions to other works ===
Elton makes references in this novel to both Shakespeare's Hamlet and Macbeth.

David, the actor, has the first four lines of Hamlet's soliloquy "To be, or not to be" tattooed around his ankle. This allows both Kelly and the police officers to identify him as a porn star who starred in a movie in which Kelly was an extra. This threatens his reputation, as he wishes to become a serious actor again.

Inspector Coleridge belongs to an amateur dramatics society that is starting rehearsals for a performance of Macbeth, one of Coleridge's favourite plays. He desperately wishes to play the lead, but the director wants someone younger to play the lead part. Coleridge's success in solving the murder wins him the part. The idea of Banquo's ghost is Coleridge's method of forcing a confession out of the murderer.

=== Allusions to actual history, geography and current science ===
The novel is dedicated to the contestants of the first Big Brother series in the UK, the second Big Brother series in the UK and the first Big Brother series in Australia. The book parodies the cult of celebrity brought on by simply being on television and says in the credits that "without [the Big Brother contestants] this novel would not have been written".

== Publication history ==
- Great Britain, Bantam Press (a division of Random House), ISBN 978-0-593-04804-7, Pub date 5 November 2001, Hardcover; ISBN 978-0-552-99945-8, Pub date 1 September 2002, Paperback.
