= Gag character =

Fictional character mainly used for comedy

A gag character is usually a character whose purpose is to entertain the audience, or in other words, for comedy.

== Narrative function ==
Gag characters usually appear in single panel cartoons that do not follow any main or centralized character (although they might follow similar types of jokes). Some examples include The Far Side, Bizarro, and Speed Bump. Because of this, gag characters are not given a broad depth of characterization, as to complement the lack of narrative continuity present in their format.

Gag characters also appear on television. However, a gag character on a syndicated or serialized show usually makes one appearance during the series' run. Any subsequent appearances make the character into a secondary character within the work.

Often, a gag character's usage is centered around humor rooted in the character's behavior or appearance. However, there are cases where a gag character may also be the main characters of a particular narrative or even series. In such cases, the narrative frequently utilizes one or more recurring jokes throughout the series unique to that main character. Examples include Arale Norimaki from the manga Dr. Slump, Marvel Comics' Squirrel Girl, or Saitama from the manga One Punch Man among other examples. Due to being protagonists of their own respective show, such characters tend to be given more characterization and be put in a variety of scenarios, typically in parallel or in contrast to potentially much more serious characters. Such characters are also known as Modern Day Gag Characters.

== See also ==
- Unseen character
