= This Other Eden (Elton novel) =

Novel by Ben Elton

- Author: Ben Elton
- Language: English
- Genre: Environmental Fiction; Dystopian Fiction; Satire
- Publisher: Simon & Schuster
- Publication date: 1993
- Publication place: United Kingdom
- Media type: Print
- ISBN: 0-552-77183-X
- Preceded by: Gridlock (1991)
- Followed by: Popcorn (1996)

This Other Eden is a satirical novel written by the British comedian and writer Ben Elton. As with Elton's other early novels, This Other Eden is a satire advocating greater environmentalism.

== Plot ==
The novel is set in the reasonably near future. Earth is being devastated by mankind's continued exploitation, and it seems obvious that the environment will collapse sometime in the near future. Rather than adopt a more eco-friendly approach to life, most people have instead invested in a "claustrosphere", a dome-shaped habitat in which all water, food and air is endlessly recycled in a completely closed environment. A person can therefore survive indefinitely within a claustrosphere no matter what ecological horrors may happen outside.

The bulk of the book focuses on a British writer, Nathan, who is attempting to sell an idea for a claustrosphere commercial to Plastic Tolstoy, owner and chief marketer of the company which builds them. The commercial represents a change in emphasis for the advertising campaign; up to now claustropheres have been sold as a kind of fall-back insurance, just in case the environment collapses. However, now that virtually everybody owns at least a basic model, sales are falling and the company is having to try and sell upgrade and improvement packages instead. The new advertising, therefore, attempts to convince people for the first time that the environment truly is doomed and they are inevitably going to have to live in their claustrospheres.

Tolstoy accepts Nathan's idea and assigns him to work with Max, a shallow and pretentious young actor. During a subsequent meeting with Tolstoy, Nathan makes a joking suggestion that it would be ironic if his company actually covertly sponsored the eco-terrorism movement led by Jurgen Thor, which despises the claustrosphere company since it represents, in their eyes, an abrogation of mankind's responsibility to care for the environment. Nathan is subsequently murdered as he plays a virtual reality game with Max. Max sets out to investigate the murder, falling in with Rosalie Connolly, an eco-terrorist working for Thor's organization.

Max ultimately discovers that Thor and Tolstoy are in fact partners. The eco-terrorists raids, whilst highly successful, never present more than a minor problem to the vast claustrosphere company, but do grab headlines and bring awareness of the looming eco-disaster into the public mind - prompting them to buy more claustrospheres. Tolstoy confesses that he has even geared his advertising campaign to work in perfect sync with the terrorists, with new commercials ready to roll out instantly after each attack.

After a confrontation between Max, Rosalie and Jurgen in which Jurgen is killed, Tolstoy decides to evade justice by leaking news indicating that the ecology is finally collapsing. The news is suddenly full of stories of environmental catastrophe, and people are told that they need to lock themselves in their claustrospheres for several decades. The "rat run", as it is termed, removes the large bulk of humanity from the world, effectively ending the current civilization. Ironically, one of the by-products of the vanishing of global society is that all industry ceases, ending further pollution of the environment. Freed of this burden, Earth begins to gradually recover from the damage inflicted to it.
