= Alazon =

Comedic stock character in the theatre of Ancient Greece

Alazṓn (Ancient Greek: ἀλαζών) is one of three stock characters in comedy of the theatre of ancient Greece. He is the opponent of the eirôn. The alazṓn is an impostor that sees himself as greater than he actually is. The senex iratus (the angry old man) and the miles gloriosus (the braggart soldier) are two types of alazṓn.

== Miles Gloriosus ==
Miles Gloriosus (literally, "braggart-soldier", in Latin) is a stock character of a boastful soldier from the comic theatre of ancient Rome, and variations on this character have appeared in drama and fiction ever since. The character derives from the alazṓn or "braggart" of the Greek Old Comedy (e.g. Aristophanes). The term "Miles Gloriosus" is occasionally applied in a contemporary context to refer to a posturing and self-deceiving boaster or bully.

=== Literary instances ===
In the play Miles Gloriosus ("Boastful Soldier") by Plautus, the term applies to the main character Pyrgopolynices. This foolish Miles Gloriosus brags openly and often about his supposed greatness, while the rest of the characters feign their admiration and secretly plot against him. Heavily borrowing from Plautus, the Stephen Sondheim-Burt Shevelove-Larry Gelbart musical A Funny Thing Happened on the Way to the Forum features a warrior named Miles Gloriosus.

An example in Terence of the alazon character is Thraso in the Eunuchus. Like Pyrgopolinices in the Miles Gloriosus, Thraso is attended by a flatterer or parasite who follows him round and attends to his wishes. Like Pyrgopolinices, Thraso is wealthy and is a rival of the young man in the story for the love of a courtesan.

Shakespeare uses the type most notably with the bombastic and self-glorifying ensign Ancient Pistol in Henry IV, Part 2, The Merry Wives of Windsor and Henry V. Other examples are "fashion's own knight", the Spaniard Armardo, in Love's Labour's Lost, the worthless Captain Parolles in All's Well That Ends Well, and Falstaff in Henry IV, Part 1 and Part 2, and The Merry Wives of Windsor. Sir Tophas of John Lyly's Endymion also fits the mold.

Baron Munchausen is a braggart soldier.

In Commedia dell'arte, the figure of Il Capitano is a miles gloriosus.

In Dr Strangelove, Gen. Jack Ripper reveals himself as a boastful soldier when we discover that his tough talk about torture is to cover up his own fear of it; whereas Capt. Mandrake - the eirôn - actually was tortured, and seems to have dealt with it.

=== Other media ===
In music, the title role of Háry János by Kodály is an example of the character.

In the PC game The Elder Scrolls III: Morrowind, there is a non-playable character named Miles Gloriosus, willing to brag about his accomplishments as a soldier.

== Senex iratus ==
The senex iratus or heavy father figure is a comic archetype character who belongs to the alazon or impostor group in theater, manifesting himself through his rages and threats, his obsessions and his gullibility.

His usual function is to impede the love of the hero and heroine, and his power to do so stems from his greater social position and his increased control of cash. In the New Comedy, he was often the father of the hero and so his rival. More frequently since, he has been the father of the heroine who insists on her union with the bad fiancé; as such, he appears in both A Midsummer Night's Dream, where he fails and so the play is a comedy, and Romeo and Juliet, where his acts are successful enough to render the play a tragedy.

Pantalone in Commedia dell'arte acts as a senex iratus.

In his Anatomy of Criticism, Northrop Frye considered all blocking humors in comedy to be variations on the basic function of the senex iratus.

== See also ==
- Boasting
- Bômolochus
- Eirôn
- Exaggeration

== Sources ==
- Carlson, Marvin A. (1993). Theories of the Theatre: A Historical and Critical Survey from the Greeks to the Present. Cornell University Press. ISBN 978-0-8014-8154-3.
- Aristotle (1987). Aristotle: Poetics. Translated by Janko, Richard. Hackett Publishing. ISBN 978-0-87220-033-3.
