= Michael Bradway =

American actor (born 1998)

- Born: December 30, 1998 (age 27); Boca Raton, Florida
- Occupation: Actor
- Years active: 2021–present

Michael Bradway (born December 30, 1998) is an American actor known for his roles in television series Chicago Fire (2024–2025) and Every Year After (2026–present).

== Early life and education ==
Bradway is from Boca Raton, Florida. He graduated from the New York Film Academy with a BFA in Acting for Film in 2020. He has worked as a model.

== Career ==
Bradway made his screen acting debut in 2021 with a short film Piece, followed by Tino in 2022. He appeared in the 2025 films Marked Men and Safe House.

Bradway portrayed recurring character Jack Damon, Kelly Severide's half-brother, in seasons twelve and thirteen of Chicago Fire. This was his first television role.

Since 2026, Bradway plays Charlie Florek in the Amazon Prime Video series Every Year After, based on Carley Fortune's book Every Summer After. He had not read the book before auditioning, but was cast after a chemistry read with Matt Cornett, who plays his brother Sam. A review in the Hindustan Times called Bradway the "standout" of the series, saying he often makes his character "more interesting than the show's central love story."

== Personal life ==
Bradway has been dating actress Veronica St. Clair since 2023. He announced their engagement on Instagram in February 2025.

== Filmography ==
Year	Title	Role	Notes	Ref.
2024–2025	Chicago Fire	Jack Damon	Recurring role	
2025	Marked Men	Gabe Davenport	Film	
2025	Safe House	Reeves	Film	
2026–present	Every Year After	Charlie Florek	Main role	
