= Sadie Soverall =

British actress (born 2002)

- Born: Sadie Aileen Soverall; 17 January 2002 (age 24); Wandsworth, England
- Occupation: Actress
- Years active: 2019–present

Sadie Aileen Soverall (born 17 January 2002) is an English actress. Her films include Rose Plays Julie (2019), Little Bone Lodge, Saltburn (both 2023) and Arcadian (2024). On television, she is known for her roles in Fate: The Winx Saga (2021–2022), The Gathering (2024) and Every Year After (2026–present).

She was named a 2025 Screen International Star of Tomorrow.

== Early life ==
Soverall was born in the South London Borough of Wandsworth. She is mixed-race, being of Trinidadian, Scottish, Irish and English descent. She attended Parkgate House School and then Emanuel School. Soverall was discovered by a talent agent through a school production of Twelfth Night.

== Career ==
Soverall made her feature film debut as Eva in the 2019 Irish drama Rose Plays Julie starring Ann Skelly, Orla Brady, and Aidan Gillen. This was followed by her television debut with a main role as antagonist Beatrix in the Netflix teen fantasy series Fate: The Winx Saga, a live-action adaptation of the animated series Winx Club. Soverall balanced sitting her A Levels with filming the first season in Ireland. The series premiered in 2021 and ran for two seasons.

In 2023, Soverall starred as Maisy alongside Joely Richardson and Neil Linpow in the thriller film Little Bone Lodge and had a supporting role as Annabel in Emerald Fennell's Saltburn. In 2024, she appeared in the Channel 4 drama The Gathering and the horror film Arcadian.

In 2025, Soverall was cast in the lead role of Percy in the Amazon Prime Video romantic drama Every Year After, a series adaptation of Carley Fortune's debut novel Every Summer After.

== Acting credits ==
=== Film ===
Year	Title	Role	Notes
2019	Rose Plays Julie	Eva	
2023	Little Bone Lodge	Maisy	
2023	Saltburn	Annabel	
2024	Arcadian	Charlotte	
2026	Finding Emily	Amelie	
2026	Elsinore	Alice	

=== Television ===
Year	Title	Role	Notes
2021–2022	Fate: The Winx Saga	Beatrix	Main role
2024	The Gathering	Jessica	6 episodes
2026–present	Every Year After	Persephone "Percy" Fraser	Main role

=== Theatre ===
Year	Title	Role	Notes
2024–2025	The Cherry Orchard	Anya	Donmar Warehouse, London; St Ann's Warehouse, New York
2026	John Proctor Is the Villain	Shelby Holcomb	Royal Court Theatre, London
