= Matt Cornett =

American actor (born 1998)

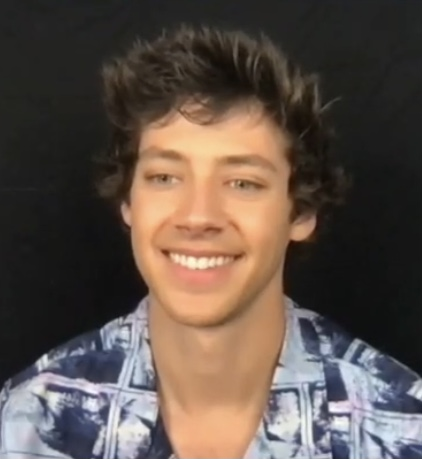
- Cornett in 2022
- Born: October 6, 1998 (age 28); Rogers, Arkansas, U.S.
- Occupation: Actor
- Years active: 2012–present

Matt Cornett (born October 6, 1998) is an American actor and singer. He is best known for his role as E.J. Caswell on the Disney+ series High School Musical: The Musical: The Series (2019–23), and Sam Florek in the TV series Every Year After on Amazon Prime Video.

== Early life ==
Cornett was raised in Rogers, Arkansas. He is the youngest son of Art and Rhonda Cornett. He moved to Los Angeles in 2012 to pursue acting.

== Career ==
Cornett started his acting career in the television series Nightmare U, where he played the role of Daniel. He starred in the film Can, in which he played the lead role as Diego. He played the guest role of Lou in the crime drama television series Southland, for which he earned a 2014 Young Artist Award for Best Performance in a TV Series - Guest Starring Young Actor.

In 2015, Cornett played Glenn in the film I Think My Babysitter's an Alien and the role of Carter in the television film The Dunes Club.

He is known for his recurring guest star role as Zach Barnes in the comedy television series Bella and the Bulldogs, for which he earned a 2016 Young Artist Award for Best Performance in a TV Series - Recurring Young Actor. In 2016, he shared the big screen with Natasha Henstridge in the feature film, Inconceivable.

In 2018, Cornett starred in the film Alex & Me, which was released on June 12, 2018, in which he played Logan Willis. He also starred in the role of Nathan Schurzer in the television film Perfect Citizens.

In 2019, Cornett played the role of Andrew Gallery in seventh season of The Goldbergs and was cast in the main role of E. J. Caswell on the Disney+ series High School Musical: The Musical: The Series.

In 2022, Cornett played the role of A-Lan in the sci-fi musical film Zombies 3, which was released on July 15, 2022.

In 2024, Cornett appeared in the thriller film Karma: Death at Latigo Springs. In 2025, he starred alongside Chloe Fineman and Sam Morelos in the sex comedy film Summer of 69, which premiered in theaters to positive reviews.

On March 6, 2025, it was announced that Cornett would star in the Christian indie film Bad Counselors, which will release in theaters on July 23, 2026. Four months later, Cornett was cast as the lead role of Sam in the Prime Video series Every Year After, an adaptation of Canadian writer Carley Fortune's novel Every Summer After. Every Year After premiered at the Tribeca Film Festival on June 8, 2026 and was released on Prime Video on June 10, 2026. Cornett also starred in the indie film Buster Brooks, which premiered at Zions Indie Film Fest on February 27, 2026.

== Filmography ==
=== Film ===
Year	Title	Role	Notes	Ref.
2013	Can	Diego		
2015	I Think My Babysitter's an Alien	Glenn		
2016	Inconceivable	Zach Emerson		
2018	Alex & Me	Logan Wills		
2022	Zombies 3	A-Lan		
2024	Karma: Death at Latigo Springs	Niles		
2025	Summer of 69	Max Warren		
2026	Buster Brooks	Buster Brooks		
2026	Bad Counselors †	Grayson Fuller		
2027	Jason	Asher	Post-production	

=== Television ===
Year	Title	Role	Notes
2012–2014	Nightmare U	Daniel	3 episodes
2013	Southland	Lou	Episode: "Off Duty"
2015	The Dunes Club	Carter	TV film
2015	Future Shock	Chad	
2015–2016	Bella and the Bulldogs	Zach Barnes	Recurring role; 6 episodes
2016	Criminal Minds	Austin Settergren	Episode: "The Anti-Terror Squad"
2016	The Middle	Duncan	Episode: "The Core Group"
2017	Speechless	Chase	Episode: "S-I- SICK D-A- DAY"
2017–2018	Life in Pieces	Ryan	4 episodes
2018	Alone Together	Logan	Episode: "Drama Story"
2018	Perfect Citizens	Nathan Scherzer	TV film
2019	Game Shakers	Blake	3 episodes
2019	Stressed to Death	Alston Garrett	TV film
2019–2020	The Goldbergs	Andrew Gallery	2 episodes
2019	School for Boys	Leo Grecco	
2019–2023	High School Musical: The Musical: The Series	E. J. Caswell	Main role (Season 1–3), Recurring role (Season 4); 33 episodes
2026–present	Every Year After	Sam Florek	Main role

== Awards and nominations ==
Year	Award	Category	Nominated work	Result
2014	Young Artist Award	Best Performance in a TV Series - Guest Starring Young Actor	Southland	Won
2016	Young Artist Award	Best Performance in a TV Series – Recurring Young Actor	Bella and the Bulldogs	Won
2017	Young Entertainer Award	Best Guest Starring Young Actor - Television Series	The Middle	Won
2017	Young Entertainer Award	Best Recurring Young Actor - Television Series	Bella and the Bulldogs	Nominated
