= Little Bone Lodge =

British thriller film

- Directed by: Matthias Hoene
- Written by: Neil Linpow
- Produced by: Mark Lane
- Starring: Joely Richardson; Sadie Soverall; Neil Linpow; Harry Cadby
- Cinematography: Job Reineke
- Edited by: Niles Howard
- Music by: Christopher Carmichael
- Production company: Tea Shop Productions
- Distributed by: Signature Entertainment
- Release date: 2023
- Running time: 93 Minutes
- Country: United Kingdom

Little Bone Lodge (also released as The Last Exit) is a psychological thriller film directed by Matthias Hoene, from a script written by Neil Linpow. The film premiered at the Glasgow Film Festival (GFF) in March 2023. It was picked up by Signature Entertainment for distribution. It stars Joely Richardson, Neil Linpow, Sadie Soverall, Harry Cadby, Clifford Samuel, Cameron Jack, Sharon Young, Roger Ajogbe, Jamie Melrose and Euan Bennett.

== Synopsis ==
Set over one night as a vicious storm sweeps across the Scottish highlands, two criminal brothers on the run are forced to seek sanctuary in a remote farmhouse. Taking the resident family hostage, they soon find themselves in a deadly struggle for survival, where the family set up is not quite as straightforward as it first appears to be. With the police and old ‘friends’ closing in fast, they must find a way to escape this new nightmare and in the process confront issues in their own fractured relationship.

== Cast ==
- Joely Richardson as Mama
- Neil Linpow as Jack
- Sadie Soverall as Maisy
- Harry Cadby as Matty
- Roger Ajogbe as Pa
- Clifford Samuel as PC Adams
- Sharon Young as Bella
- Cameron Jack as McCalister
- Euan Bennett as Duncan
- Jamie Melrose as DC Stanton

== Production ==
Little Bone Lodge began filming in February, 2022, in Westerham before moving to exteriors in Scotland.

== Reception ==
The film premiered at the 2023 GFF as part of the Frightfest strand, before releasing across the UK in May 2023. It holds an approval rating of 100% on Rotten Tomatoes, garnering strong reviews with focus going on the complex characterisations, twisting narrative and excellent performances from the cast. The Guardian described it as a 'Scarily fierce and tense thriller.'
