= Luca Legnani =

Italian-born producer

Luca Legnani (born Milan, 1980) is an Italian producer, noted art collector, former dancer, and one-time TV cop.

== Biography ==
He has done music videos for Ricky Martin, Snoop Dogg, Fabri Fibra, Cor Veleno, The Rain, Eros Ramazzotti, Stateless, Geri Halliwell, Gwen Stefani, Planet Funk, Gianluca Grignani, Katie Price and Peter Andre, and many more. For many years, he produced music videos, commercials, and TV content for the prominent Italian production company, Filmmaster. In 2007, he opened up an independent production house, Pines Films Limited, based in central London.

He is a noted art collector, as well as a former curator at Bocconi University with Luca Martinazzoli.

== Notable recent projects ==
In 2007, Legnani produced "Help Lorenzo," a project to help Italian film director Lorenzo Bassano who was jailed in Dubai for possession of a ridiculous amount of hashish. This effort included a free concert in Milan with performances by Elio e Le Storie Tese, Cor Veleno, Grandi Animali Marini, Le Vibrazioni, Fabri Fibra, Club Dogo, Coolio, J Ax, The Styles and more. The concert was supported by Radio DeeJay.

In 2008, Legnani became producer for Check-In Architecture, a cultural research project that's developing a cultural map of Europe, partnered with Google, which includes 300 short documentaries created by students and renowned cultural producers including Andrew Berardini, Olivia Fincato, Christophe Tassin, Vincent Moon, Alessandro Zuek Simonetti, Ed Rutherford, Giovanna Silva, Filippo Romano, Andrea Lissioni, Luca Martinazoli, Luca Molinari, Francesco Fei and Mario Benini. Also included is a free press magazine, a blog, and starting in April 2008, the project was shown on the Urban Screen, a 148-meter video screen overlooking Piazza del Duomo, Milan.

In 2008 worked as line producer on the Award-Winning short movie Afterville, directed by Fabio Guaglione and Fabio Resinaro and starring Giorgia Würth, Roberto Laureri, Paolo Giangrasso and David Traylor. The movie has been produced by BB Productions and FastForward, in association with FIlmmaster Clip.

In summer 2009 has filmed as executive producer on War Games: At the End of the Day, the first feature film of director Cosimo Alema, starring Andrew Harwood Mills, Sam Cohan, Michael Lutz, Stephanie Chapman Baker and Neil Linpow among others. The movie has been made under the executive production of The Mob and will be released in Italian cinemas on 22 July 2011 by Bolero Film. The film has been proved very successful in the international market and will be distributed throughout Europe by Universal Picture, in Australia by Transmission and in Japan by Nikkatsu among many others.

From the 13 to 30 December 2011 he opened MINEMA, a temporary mini cinema in Milan. The place was hosted by Mareselleria and was designed by Canedicoda.

Legnani was also the director behind the YouTube sleeper hit, "Trovami Un Modo Semplice Per Uscirne" (trans. "Find Me an Easy Way to Get Out of It").
