= War Games: At the End of the Day =

- Italian film poster
- Directed by: Cosimo Alemà
- Written by: Cosimo Alemà; Romana Meggiolaro; Daniele Persica
- Produced by: Andrea Biscaro; Fulvio Compagnucci; Lorenzo Foschi; Luca Legnani; Davide Luchetti; Daniele Persica; Alan Vele
- Starring: Stephanie Chapman-Baker; Sam Cohan; Valene Kane; Neil Linpow; Lutz Michael; Andrew Harwood Mills; Monika Mirga; Tom Stanley; Daniel Vivian
- Cinematography: Marco Bassano
- Edited by: Alessio Borgonuovo
- Music by: Anja Plaschg; Nico Vascellari
- Release date: 2011
- Country: Italy
- Budget: Estimated €400 000

War Games: At the End of the Day is a 2011 independent thriller film directed by Cosimo Alemà, who co-wrote it with Daniele Persica and Romana Meggiolaro. Luca Legnani is credited as executive producer. The film is distributed by Universal Pictures. It stars Stephanie Chapman Baker, Neil Linpow, Michael Lutz, Sam Cohan, Valene Kane, Andrew Harwood Mills, Tom Stanley, Monika Mirga, Daniel Vivian and Michael Schermi.

The film is claimed to be inspired by real events that took place on June 5, 1992.

== Plot ==
The film follows an adventure seeking group of friends who visit a National Park to spend the day playing Airsoft. However, after discovering a building filled with dark secrets they are hunted down one by one, by the building's vicious occupants: three ex soldiers intent on keeping them from telling anyone. Their war game is turned into a reality, where they will be forced to fight for their survival.

== Cast ==
- Stephanie Chapman Baker as Lara
- Neil Linpow as Riko
- Michael Lutz as Unkle
- Valene Kane as Monika
- Sam Cohan as Alex
- Andrew Harwood Mills as Chino
- Tom Stanley as Thomas
- Monika Mirga as Diana
- Daniel Vivian as Vinny
- Michael Schermi as Raw

== Production ==
War Games: At the End of the Day began filming in August, 2009, and in Bracciano, Italy.

=== Reception ===
The film attracted strong reviews during its theatrical release and has screened at festivals including Cannes Film Festival, Berlin film festival, Fantafest. Noir in Festival, Fantasy FilmFest, Sitges Film Festival and Raindance.
