= The Warriors Gate =

2016 French-Chinese film by Matthias Hoene

- Theatrical release poster
- 勇士之門
- Directed by: Matthias Hoene
- Written by: Luc Besson; Robert Mark Kamen
- Produced by: Mark Gao; Luc Besson
- Starring: Mark Chao; Ni Ni; Dave Bautista; Francis Ng; Sienna Guillory; Uriah Shelton
- Cinematography: Maxime Alexandre
- Edited by: Audrey Simonaud
- Music by: Klaus Badelt
- Production companies: EuropaCorp; Fundamental Films
- Distributed by: EuropaCorp
- Release date: 18 November 2016 (China)
- Running time: 108 minutes
- Countries: China; France
- Language: English
- Budget: US$48 million
- Box office: US$3.5 million

The Warriors Gate (Chinese: 勇士之門, also released as Enter the Warriors Gate) is a 2016 Chinese-French action-adventure-fantasy film directed by Matthias Hoene and written by Luc Besson and Robert Mark Kamen. It was released in China on November 18, 2016, in 2D, 3D and China Film Giant Screen 3D, and on video on demand in the United States on 5 May 2017.

== Plot ==
Jack Bronson is a teenager who spends his free time playing warrior video games and working at a Chinese curios and antiques shop. His mother is trying to sell the house they live in before it goes into foreclosure. When Jack goes to a biking park, Travis, a neighborhood bully and his friends chase after him and he hides inside his bosses shop and helps out. A family heirloom, The Warriors Gate, from Mr Cheng's cousin in Beijing arrives at the shop and he gives it to Jack as a gift.

Jack goes to sleep with the thing in his room and wakes up with a sword at his neck. A warrior, Zhao tells him that the ‘Black Knight’ has to look after the most precious thing in the kingdom; the Princess. Jack gets to know Princess Su Lin and she stays with him overnight. The next morning, barbarians from the game realm come to kill the Princess but she fights them off, destroying the house in the process. The barbarians take the Princess back into the other realm through the Warriors Gate but when Jack goes in after her, he arrives somewhere else. The Warrior who sent the Princess to stay with Jack is there and there is an army of barbarians trying to kill them. The Wizard stops time and the army is frozen.

The Wizard tells Jack that Zhao was one of seven children raised from birth to protect the Emperor and that the only person who could defeat them was Arun the Cruel, King of the barbarians. Arun poisoned the warriors and killed the Emperor and the only people left alive were Su Lin and Zhao. The wizard searched through his seeing stone to find the greatest Warrior to protect the Princess and found The Black Knight; Jack's in game avatar; a ferocious and clever Warrior. Jack and Zhao find out that Arun will marry the Princess, become Emperor and then have her killed; so their mission is to save her.

While on their way through the "Unknown Kingdom" Jack tries to get Zhao to dance and have fun. In the forest, Jack and Zhao encounter the mountain spirit who is cooking a pot of potatoes and blocking the duo's way. Zhao asks the witch to move but she refuses and they start fighting. Zhao falls off the cliff and the witch is trying to get him to fall off before Jack throws a burnt log at her, killing her afterwards. Zhao then says that Jack may not be worthless at all. At night Zhao starts to teach Jack how to fight. They get to a lake and Zhao says the trek around it will take days because he cannot swim. Jack agrees to teach him if Zhao continues teaching him how to fight like a Warrior.

When they arrive at Arun's kingdom they turn themselves in; as part of Zhao's plan to get into the kingdom and past all the guards and knights. They get free by working together to kill the guard when he gives them their food. Jack saves Su Lin but just as they're about to kiss Zhao barges in and interrupts them. On their way out they get recaptured and put back in their cell, Jack tells Zhao that he's too young to die, having never even kissed a girl. Zhao reveals that neither has he. A butterfly appears and Zhao has a conversation with it. Jack asks if the butterfly understood him and Zhao replies that he hopes so.

During the wedding when Arun lifts up her veil and goes to kiss Su Lin he sees that her face is of that of a reptilian monster with a long tongue and huge eyes. The Wizard uses his magic to distract everyone and frees Jack and Zhao just before hanging. The Wizard pours magic powder on Jacks shoes and tells him to jump. Jack saves the princess (whom the Wizard soon turns back to normal) and all the barbarians try to kill them. The wizard gives Jack bags of magic powder to throw at them. One of the bags makes one of the barbarians a huge monster, however; too large for Jack and a formidable foe for Zhao. Eventually, Jack and Su Lin catapult themselves faraway and Zhao and the Wizard get away as well.

Jack wakes up in a forest alone and after a search finds Su Lin tied up. Arun's guards attack Jack but he fights them off. Arun and Jack fight until Jack kills Arun and saves the Princess.

Su Lin is crowned Empress and sometime afterwards they kiss and she tells Jack that she never thought he was worthless; not even when they first met. The Empress's guards see her lipstick on Jack's face and try to kill him for touching her; but he gets home through the Warriors Gate; smashing it to pieces and rendering it useless to get back.

When he goes to school the next day Jack finally defeats his bully, Travis. At home, Jack tries to put the Warriors Gate back together but fails so he creates a video game called ‘The Warriors Gate’ and sells it for $25,000 so that he and his mom get to keep their house. Days later Jack is at the mall for some ice-cream and bumps into Su Lin. She had the Wizard make her another box/gate and made a new law that everyone gets holidays; even the Empress. Back in Empress's Kingdom, we see Zhao teaching all the knights to dance. Su Lin also dances a modern dance while standing on the balcony of her Forbidden City- like palace.

== Cast ==
- Mark Chao as Warrior Zhao
- Ni Ni as Princess Su Lin
- Dave Bautista as Arun The Cruel / The Mean / The Horrible / The Terrible / The Strong / The Miserable
- Francis Ng as Wizard
- Sienna Guillory as Annie Bronson
- Uriah Shelton as Jack Bronson / The Black Knight
- Ron Smoorenburg as The Black Knight
- David Torok as Viking Warrior
- Dakota Daulby as Travis Leigh

== Production ==
The film had a budget of CN¥300 million. Filming started on 4 May 2015. It was filmed on location at Hengdian World Studios in Jinhua, China and in British Columbia, Canada.

== Reception ==
The Hollywood Reporter compared the film to The Last Starfighter. Discussing the director, the review noted that "Hoene keeps things competent rather than creative, and shows little of the flair he did in Cockneys vs Zombies" and that the story wades into "familiar territory" that may attract a young adult audience "for YA audiences that are heavily into the 1980s".

== See also ==
- White savior narrative in film
