= Arcadian (film) =

2024 action horror film

- Theatrical release poster
- Directed by: Benjamin Brewer
- Written by: Michael Nilon
- Produced by: Michael Nilon; David Wulf; Arianne Fraser; Delphine Perrier; Braxton Pope; Nicolas Cage
- Starring: Nicolas Cage; Jaeden Martell; Maxwell Jenkins
- Cinematography: Frank Mobilio
- Edited by: Kristi Shimek
- Music by: Kristin Kontrol; Josh Martin
- Production companies: Highland Film Group; Redline Entertainment; Saturn Films
- Distributed by: RLJE Films (United States); Vertigo Releasing (Ireland); Renaissance Media (Canada)
- Release dates: March 11, 2024 (SXSW); April 12, 2024 (United States)
- Running time: 92 minutes
- Countries: United States; Ireland; Canada
- Language: English
- Box office: $993,764

Arcadian is a 2024 post-apocalyptic action horror film directed by Benjamin Brewer from a screenplay by Michael Nilon. It stars Nicolas Cage as the father of two teenage boys, all trying to survive in a post-apocalyptic world. The film is an international co-production between the United States, Canada, and Ireland.

Arcadian premiered at South by Southwest on March 11, 2024, followed by a theatrical release in the United States on April 12, 2024, by RLJE Films. The film received generally favorable reviews from critics.

== Plot ==
The film opens with Paul scavenging for supplies in a storehouse and then fleeing through deserted back alleys, with the pandemonium of an apocalyptic event in the background, sirens blaring, sounds of distant explosions, and people screaming. He seeks refuge in a secluded spot, cradling his two infant boys and reassuring them that everything will be okay.

15 years later, after a pandemic has wiped out most of the population and caused civilization to break down, Paul and his twin sons, Joseph and Thomas, live in a derelict farmhouse, eking out what livelihood they can during the day and sheltering from monstrous photophobic creatures at night. As Thomas returns home one evening from a nearby farm belonging to the Rose family, it becomes apparent that he is the greater risk-taker of the two brothers, while Joseph appears more intellectual and talks about ways to improve their situation beyond mere survival. After dinner, they hear loud banging coming from the cellar, which stops after three attempts by the creatures to enter the house.

The next morning, Paul finds deep gouges on the outside of the cellar door and decides to reinforce it. Joseph reveals that he has been working to restore an off-road vehicle in the barn, and Paul shows him how to start the engine. After Paul teaches Joseph how to drive it, he sends both his sons to salvage wood to reinforce the cellar door. Thomas, who is secretly in love with Charlotte Rose, wants to go to the Rose farm and leaves his brother, telling Joseph to pick him up before sunset so they can return home together.

On his way back from the Rose farm, Thomas trips and falls into a cave, concussed and unconscious. After Joseph returns home without his brother and the night falls, Paul sets out to find Thomas and discovers him in the cave, where they decide to stay until sunrise. When several creatures converge on them through the rocks beneath the cave later in the night, Paul lights a flare, but one of his hands gets trapped, and as the charge detonates in his hand, it kills the creatures and causes the cave to collapse.

Meanwhile, home alone, Joseph uses himself as bait and traps one of the creatures, intending to study it later. Driving the buggy in the morning, he finds Thomas and Paul, who is badly injured and unconscious, and takes them home. Thomas insists that they should take their father to the Rose farm, as better care can be provided there, and because Paul won't survive without medication. They arrive at the farm, and Mr. Rose and his wife announce they cannot spare any medicine to help him, though they are willing to let Thomas stay. Joseph and Thomas get into a fight, and Joseph returns home with Paul, while Thomas stays at the farm.

Thomas is caught by Charlotte looking for medicine to take to his father. He convinces her to show him where it is kept and promises to return, but as he attempts to sneak back home, he is stopped at the gate and held at gunpoint by a farmhand who takes him for a looter. He and the other farmhands restrain Thomas and threaten to punish him for his thievery.

Back home, Joseph finds a large hole forming under the floorboards and realizes the creatures have been digging under the house to get inside. At the Rose farm, they attack through a similar hole dug under the floor, killing everyone except Thomas and Charlotte, who escape to Paul's farm. There, Paul regains consciousness and suggests a course of action to fight the creatures. Joseph starts preparing a trap, planning to set off several gallons of fuel as an improvised fire bomb. In order to give the brothers and Charlotte more time to make it to safety, Paul locks the door behind them and holds the creatures off until the bomb explodes, sacrificing his life.

The next day, Charlotte buries her parents. She joins Joseph and Thomas, and the trio set off to check for possible survivors on the other farms in the area.

== Cast ==
- Nicolas Cage as Paul
- Jaeden Martell as Joseph
- Maxwell Jenkins as Thomas
- Sadie Soverall as Charlotte
- Joe Dixon as Mr. Rose
- Samantha Coughlan as Mrs. Rose

== Production ==
In October 2022, it was announced that Nicolas Cage would star in the film. In November, Jaeden Martell, Maxwell Jenkins, and Sadie Soverall joined the cast.

Principal photography began in Dublin, Ireland, in November 2022. In February 2023, it was announced that filming had wrapped and that the film was in post-production.

== Release ==
Arcadian premiered at SXSW on March 11, 2024.

RLJE Films acquired distribution rights for North America, the UK, Australia, and Ireland, scheduling the film's North American theatrical release for April 12, 2024, followed by a streaming release later in the year on Shudder and AMC+.

The film was released in the United Kingdom on June 14, 2024.

== Reception ==
On the review aggregator website Rotten Tomatoes, 78% of 115 critics' reviews are positive, with an average rating of 6.4/10. The website's consensus reads: "Led by a trio of strong performances, Arcadian blends family drama and post-apocalyptic horror to visceral, emotionally stirring effect." Metacritic, which uses a weighted average, assigned the film a score of 57 out of 100, based on 23 critics, indicating "mixed or average" reviews.

Steve Rose gave the film a 3/5 rating and wrote a review in The Guardian: "A lean and competent, albeit generic, thriller, with the added benefit of Nicolas Cage."

Reviewing the film for Daily Telegraph, Tim Robey was slightly less enthusiastic: "Brewer ... neglects the mightiest special effects at his disposal, which are Cage's face, voice and hands."

Barry Levitt of Empire Magazine wrote, "Though things go off the rails in the third act, Arcadian's intriguing premise and inspired monster design pack plenty of scares into this post-apocalyptic fable."
