= Every Year After =

American romantic drama television series

- Promotional poster
- Genre: Romantic drama
- Based on: Every Summer After by Carley Fortune
- Developed by: Amy B. Harris; Leila Gerstein
- Showrunner: Amy B. Harris
- Starring: Sadie Soverall; Matt Cornett; Michael Bradway; Abigail Cowen; Joseph Chiu; Aurora Perrineau
- Music by: Tom Howe
- Country of origin: United States
- Original language: English
- No. of seasons: 1
- No. of episodes: 8

Production
- Executive producers: Amy B. Harris; Lindsey Liberatore; Carley Fortune; Amy Rardin; John Stephens; Gillian Robespierre
- Producer: Grace Gilroy
- Cinematography: Brian Burgoyne; Mathias Herndl; Rob Marsh
- Editors: Kindra Marra; Jacquelyn Le; Shannon Mitchell; Garret Price; Steve Edwards
- Running time: 43–55 minutes
- Production companies: A.B. Baby Productions; Hook & Harmony Productions; Reunion Pacific Entertainment; Amazon MGM Studios

Original release
- Network: Amazon Prime Video
- Release: June 10, 2026 – present

Every Year After is an American romantic drama television series developed by Amy B. Harris and Leila Gerstein. Based on the Every Summer After novel series written by Carley Fortune. The series stars Sadie Soverall, Matt Cornett, Michael Bradway, and Abigail Cowen.

The series had its world premiere at the Tribeca Festival on June 8, 2026, and was released on Amazon Prime Video on June 10, 2026. In June 2026, the series was renewed for a second season.

== Premise ==
The story follows the second chance romance of Percy (Sadie Soverall) and Sam (Matt Cornett), who go from friends to lovers over several summers spent in Barry's Bay beside the lake. Percy returns to Barry's Bay after ten years following a tragedy, forcing her to confront her childhood first love, Sam, his brother Charlie (Michael Bradway), and the painful secret mistake that drove the couple apart.

Two lifelong friends, Percy and Sam, explore the question: what if your first love was destined to be your soulmate?

== Cast and characters ==
=== Main ===
- Sadie Soverall as Persephone "Percy" Fraser, a 28-year-old obituary writer who goes back to her childhood summer hometown, Barry's Bay, Ontario, Canada, for Sue's memorial
- Matt Cornett as Sam Florek, Percy's childhood best friend and ex-boyfriend, who is a cardiologist
- Michael Bradway as Charlie Florek, Sam's older brother and a hedge fund manager
- Abigail Cowen as Delilah Mason, Percy's childhood best frenemy and the Florek brothers' friend
- Joseph Chiu as Jordie, Sam's best friend and the owner of the Bay Breeze Motel
- Aurora Perrineau as Chantal, Percy's current best friend and an attorney

=== Recurring ===
- Elisha Cuthbert as Sue Florek, Sam and Charlie's mother
- Juliette Hawk as Young Percy
- Carson MacCormac as Young Charlie
- Blue Clarke as Young Sam
- Fred Ewanuick as Arthur Fraser, Percy's father
- Robyn Ross as Diane, Percy's mother
- Karl Walcott as Drew, Chantal's fiancé
- Roan Curtis as Taylor, Sam's current girlfriend, and a pediatrician

== Episodes ==
No.	Title	Directed by	Teleplay by	Original release date
1	"Every Summer After"	Gillian Robespierre	Amy B. Harris and Leila Gerstein	June 10, 2026
In Seattle 2026, Percy Fraser attends the engagement party for her friends, Chantal and Drew. She then goes home to sleep with her friend-with-benefits, Jake. She gets a call from an old friend, Charlie, who calls to let her know that his mother has died and asks her to come to her funeral. Flashbacks to 2011 show Percy, Charlie, and Sam's first meeting one summer many years ago when Percy moved there. Percy quickly grows close to the brothers and their mother, Sue. Flashbacks to 2016, show Percy ends up in a very deep, emotional relationship with Sam, but left for reasons unknown. Percy returns to Barry's Bay for the first time in ten years. She tries to avoid seeing Sam, due to something that happened between them. Sam's friend, Jordie, is unhappy to see her return due to whatever happened a decade ago. Sam is now a doctor, when he finds out that Charlie invited Percy, the two get into a fight. The brothers' childhood friend, Delilah, is now married, but she and Charlie are up to something, together. Percy finally sees Sam again, and the two have a romantic moment, until Sam's girlfriend, Taylor, comes in.
2	"Young Blood"	Jeff W. Byrd	Leila Gerstein and Julie Rottenberg & Elisa Zuritsky	June 10, 2026
Charlie and Delilah are sleeping together and also working together, both planning to sell Sue's bar. They have kept this a secret from Sam, who doesn't want to sell it. Flashbacks to 2012 show Percy, Sam, Charlie, and Delilah hanging out. During a game of spin the bottle, Sam refuses to kiss Percy, embarrassing her. But the two end up growing close through their shared love of horror movies. In the present, Chantal and Jordie grow closer. Taylor, a fellow doctor, is working on Sue's obituary, but Sam ends up asking Percy to review it. In the present, While Percy searches Sam's room for pictures for the memorial, she finds an engagement ring. Heartbroken, she runs back to her room. As it rains, there's a knock at the door. It's Sam.
3	"Playing with Fire"	Jeff W. Byrd	John Stephens	June 10, 2026
Percy helps Sam write Sue's obituary and plan the wake as Taylor is out of town. In the process, they keep having romantic moments together and keep breaking apart before anything can happen. Delilah breaks off her and Charlie's fling and Charlie drives Chantal to get a passport after hers expires. Flashbacks to 2013 show the last few days of summer break that year. Percy is scared when watching a horror movie and spends the night with Sam, both sleeping in the same bed during a hurricane storm. They both consider initiating something, but neither does. Delilah and Charlie each encourage Percy and Sam, respectively, to do something with the other, but they don't. At an end of summer bonfire, Sam dismisses Percy so she kisses a guy to make him jealous. The next day, he tells her to apologise but doesn't want to ruin their friendship, or whatever they have. In the present, Percy runs away after almost kissing Sam. Sam says he doesn't think when he's with Percy. As Percy tries to leave town and her hotel, she is approached by a lawyer who tells her she has to stay as she has been left in Sue's will.
4	"Anatomy of a Romance"	Tara Nicole Weyr	Amy Rardin	June 10, 2026
At Sue's will reading, everyone is shocked to learn Sue has left the bar to Percy. Sam and Charlie question her intentions, Sam believes she always knew what she was doing while Charlie reveals she wasn't always perfect, and that after their dad died, she fell into a deep depression and he had to take care of Sam. Delilah tries to get Percy to sell the tavern to her, but she refuses. Delilah reveals that Percy's childhood home is being demolished so they, and Chantal, break in where Percy finds her old writings. The three get drunk and reminisce. Percy has spent her twenties hooking up and Delilah wishes she had done that, rather than get married. She is now separated. Eventually the cops show up and Percy is arrested. Flashbacks to 2014 show Percy and Sam's first kiss. They grow close fast, but after a talk with Sue, Sam realizes he needs to focus on med school, breaking Percy's heart and ending things before they really begin. Sam bails Percy out of jail, where Percy confronts him for giving her mixed signals, saying sometimes it feels like he wants her and then others he wants nothing to do with her. After a call with her dad, Percy realizes Sue gave her the tavern so she could come back to Barry's Bay, the only place her writing and creativity flourishes. Charlie and Sam decide to contest the will. Sam thanks Charlie for always having his back, but a look on Charlie's face indicates there's something he doesn't know.
5	"I Choose You"	Tara Nicole Weyr	John Stephens	June 10, 2026
Flashbacks to New Year's Eve 2014 and then summer 2015 show Percy and Sam struggling with their breakup. At NYE, Sam is jealous when Percy brings a boyfriend and tries to get back with Percy, but she refuses. Also at the party, Delilah is left feeling hurt when Charlie hooks up with another random girl. She ends up kissing Jordie at midnight. In summer 2015, Sam has a new girlfriend, Lake, whom he works with at the tavern. Percy becomes jealous of their relationship and takes a job at the tavern to get close to him. In the present, Sam plans to propose to Taylor. Drew comes to town bringing Jake, who Percy tries to sleep with to hide her feelings for Sam. Chantal grows frustrated over Drew making her feel like a babysitter and not ever doing anything for her, and in the process grows closer to Jordie. Charlie's lawyer tells him they will not be able to contest the will and he's left feeling hurt that Sue would have given what was theirs to Percy. Delilah tells Charlie their relationship is over since the selling of the tavern isn't happening anymore. Charlie proposes they try to have a real relationship, but Delilah says he isn't capable of being that kind of guy. Struggling with her feelings for Sam, Percy is unable to sleep with Jake. Similarly, Sam realizes he has feelings for Percy and breaks up with Taylor. Upset, a drunk Charlie confronts Delilah over rejecting him, and asks her if they can give a relationship a try, while almost exposing a secret between him and Percy. Intercut between a love confession in 2015 and the present, Sam finds Percy at their special meeting spot. In both timelines, he confesses Percy is the one he wants to be with. In 2015, they kiss. But in 2026, right before they kiss, Percy tells Sam there's something she needs to tell him.
6	"Plan B"	Jeff W. Byrd	Julie Rottenberg & Elisa Zuritsky	June 10, 2026
Percy reveals to Sam that she and Charlie slept together many years ago, devastating Sam, who disappears. Chantal, Charlie, and Delilah are forced to find him, where they find him drunk in a bar. During the road trip to find him, Chantal and Jordie almost kiss, and later say they're glad they didn't make a mistake. Flashbacks to 2015 show Percy and Sam struggling to sleep together for the first time, while Delilah struggles with the shocking revelation that she's pregnant. Percy is too busy with Sam to notice, but they reconcile, Delilah later gets an abortion and Percy and Sam have their first time after. Chantal tells Drew that she doesn't know if she wants to marry him anymore. When Charlie is putting a drunk Sam to bed, Sam says that despite it all, he still loves Percy.
7	"The Boathouse"	Jeff W. Byrd	Amy Rardin	June 10, 2026
Flashbacks to 2016 show Percy's final summer before she never returned to Barry's Bay. She had planned a big summer with the brothers, until Sam tells her he is leaving early for med school, upsetting her. They try to do long distance but Sam is always busy and blows her off. In the meantime, she spends the summer with Charlie working on repairing his dad's old boat. Ultimately, Sam breaks up with Percy by email and when she calls him, another girl answers the phone. Hurt, she sleeps with Charlie to get back at Sam. In the present, Percy and Charlie get trapped in the garage where Percy has an anxiety attack. The time allows them to talk and both take responsibility for sleeping with each other. Meanwhile, Delilah, Chantal, and Jordie spend the day together where Chantal and Jordie try to avoid the feelings they have for each other. Sam destroys a bench he and Charlie made together. Percy tells Charlie she would sleep with other people to hurt Sam or other guys when she was hurt, but ultimately, she is in love with Sam. Just as Sam finds them together and opens the door, having heard her.
8	"Goodbye..."	John Polson	Amy B. Harris & Amy Rardin	June 10, 2026
The day of Sue's funeral is here. Sam still refuses to speak to Percy and Charlie, while Percy plans Sue's memorial. Flashbacks to 2016 show Percy and Sue's relationship. Sam and Charlie have left, which Sue finds odd. Percy leans on her, feeling heartbroken about her breakup. She and Sue grow closer and spend time together, with Sue comforting her. After the tense memorial, Sam tells Charlie he has no family left, while also mourning Sue dying unfairly young. Further flashbacks show Sam showing up in summer 2016 to make things right with Percy, but she says things are ruined and leaves Barry's Bay for the last time for ten years. In the present, Percy confesses to Sam she loved him her whole life and always missed him. They then have sex as a proper goodbye where Sam says she broke his heart. Percy leaves town. Back in Seattle, she writes horror stories that mirror her life and romance with Sam, about a girl, Persephone, banished to the underworld and a place (Barry's Bay) where she was happy. Sam reads her stories and eventually, sends her the key to Sue's tavern, saying its her place. In 2027, Percy becomes successful, she, Delilah, and Chantal become friends. Charlie throws himself into his work, where he suspiciously notices a photo of him, Sam, and Percy one summer, having been taken by someone unknown and sold at a gallery. When summer comes, the trio returns to Barry's Bay, where Percy and Delilah are re-opening the tavern. Chantal has started dating Jordie, but they disagree on making things serious. After the opening of the tavern, Percy is washing dishes in the kitchen when Sam returns. Happily, she turns to face him and says "you came home". At work, Charlie collapses of a heart attack.

== Production ==
=== Development ===
On July 31, 2024, Amazon Prime Video gave production a series order for Every Year After which is based on Every Summer After by Carley Fortune. The series is developed and showran by Leila Gerstein who is also expected to executive produce alongside Fortune. Upon series regulars announcement, it was reported that Gerstein left the series and Amy B. Harris is expected to be the new showrunner and executive producer. Later, Lindsey Liberatore, Amy Rardin, and John Stephens joined the series as executive producers. On June 27, 2026, Amazon Prime Video renewed the series for a second season which is set to be based on Fortune's sequel book One Golden Summer as a source material.

=== Casting ===
On July 17, 2025, Sadie Soverall, Matt Cornett, Michael Bradway, Abigail Cowen, Joseph Chiu, and Aurora Perrineau were cast in main roles. On September 24, 2025, Elisha Cuthbert was cast in a recurring role.

=== Filming ===
Principal photography for the series began on June 4, 2025, in Vancouver, and concluded on September 18, 2025.

== Release ==
Every Year After had its world premiere at the Tribeca Festival on June 8, 2026, and was released on Amazon Prime Video on June 10, 2026.

== Reception ==
On the review aggregator website Rotten Tomatoes, the series holds an approval rating of 71%, based on 28 reviews, with an average of rated reviews of 6.5/10. The website's critics consensus reads, "A standout amongst its peers, Every Year After is a familiar adaptation standing on solid genre bonafide's, delivering a sincere, sweet, picturesque, and wistful experience for all who visit." Metacritic, which uses a weighted average, assigned a score of 57 out of 100 based on 11 critics, indicating "mixed or average" reviews.
