= Fallen Angel (2003 film) =

2003 film directed by Michael Switzer

- Genre: Drama
- Based on: Fallen Angel by Don Snyder
- Written by: Don Snyder
- Directed by: Michael Switzer
- Starring: Gary Sinise; Joely Richardson
- Country of origin: United States
- Original language: English

Production
- Producer: Anne Hopkins
- Editor: Mark Rosenbaum
- Running time: 120 minutes
- Production company: Hallmark Hall of Fame

Original release
- Network: CBS
- Release: November 23, 2003

Fallen Angel is a 2003 Hallmark Hall of Fame television film directed by Michael Switzer and starring Gary Sinise and Joely Richardson. It was rerun in December 2004 and has been shown since then on the Feeln on-demand movie service, which shows many Hallmark Hall of Fame productions. It is based on the novel of the same name by Don Snyder, who also wrote the teleplay.

== Plot ==
Successful California attorney Terry McQuinn looks back on his childhood in Maine. He's the son of a widowed caretaker who is too engrossed in his work to spend much time with his son, possibly out of incurable grief following the early death of Terry's mother. When Terry's father dies, he returns to Maine to take care of and settle his father's small estate. While there, Katherine Wentworth, a New York social worker, asks Terry to re-open a house on the estate that her parents had once owned, wanting to show it to her adopted, blind daughter, Olivia.

Terry has flashbacks to his boyhood and his original meeting with Katherine as a young girl, when her parents came to his house one winter. He remembers going with Katherine and her father, a former professional football player, to deliver Christmas presents to hospitalised children, something her father did every year. One night, after the deliveries, her father's car skidded on an icy road and inadvertently killed a mother and her child. Though police ruled it an accident and planned not to pursue charges, Katherine's father disappeared completely. Terry also discovers his own father kept many pictures of their little family for years after his mother died.

When he meets Katherine again, Terry is taken by her warmth and her daughter's love of life. He learns Katherine's father' Charles, isn't dead, as his brother Warren had indicated, but alive and homeless, having worked many years at the hospital, where he still donated Christmas presents annually to children there. Terry becomes uncertain whether to tell Katherine her father is still alive, and Katherine is uncertain about falling in love with Terry.

== Cast ==
- Gary Sinise as Terry McQuinn
- Joely Richardson as Katherine Wentworth
- Dave Nichols as Charles Wentworth
- Michael Rhoades as Mac McQuinn
- Gordon Pinsent as Warren Wentworth
- Jordy Benattar as Olivia
- Jake Brockman as young Terry
- Ryan Simpkins as young Katherine
- Rick Roberts as Charles at 30
- Alisa Wiegers as Katherine's mother

== Production ==
Fallen Angel was filmed in and around Toronto.

== Reception ==
Fallen Angel was nominated for a PrimeTime Emmy award for its music score by Ernest Troost. Sinise, Richardson, and Benattar won as actors for Character and Morality in Entertainment Awards in 2005, as did Snyder (teleplay), director Michael Switzer, and producer Anne Hopkins.

TV Guide found that Sinise gave "a touching performance", while the Chicago Tribune described the film as a "gentle drama". A review at The Movie Scene stated. "What this all boils down to is that "Fallen Angel" is one of those Hallmark Christmas movies which whilst built on some familiar building blocks oozes charm as well as featuring a pleasant mystery which keeps you watching." Movie Guide praised the film as follows: "is beautifully produced, in the tradition of Hallmark Hall of Fame. It is a movie that deals with overcoming pain and suffering, dealing with the past, learning forgiveness, and seeing prayers answered in unexpected ways, many years after they were uttered. Although it’s a character study, it keeps you on the edge of your seat. Without sex or violence, there is a tangible sense of jeopardy and a concern for these characters". The Toledo Blade found it "light but satisfying".
