= Chicago Fire season 12 =

Chicago Fire
- Season 12
- Showrunner: Andrea Newman
- Starring: Taylor Kinney; Kara Killmer; David Eigenberg; Joe Minoso; Christian Stolte; Miranda Rae Mayo; Alberto Rosende; Daniel Kyri; Hanako Greensmith; Eamonn Walker
- No. of episodes: 13

Release
- Original network: NBC
- Original release: January 17 – May 22, 2024

Season chronology
- ← Previous; Season 11 Next → Season 13

The twelfth season of Chicago Fire, an American drama television series with executive producer Dick Wolf, and producers Derek Haas and Matt Olmstead, was ordered on April 10, 2023, by NBC. The season premiered on January 17, 2024. The season concluded on May 22, 2024 and contained 13 episodes. The season was affected by strikes undertaken by the Writers Guild of America (which began on May 2, 2023 and ended on September 27, 2023) and SAG-AFTRA (which began on July 14, 2023 and ended on November 9, 2023).

== Cast and characters ==
=== Main ===
- Taylor Kinney as Lieutenant Kelly Severide, Squad Company 3
- Kara Killmer as Paramedic in Charge Sylvie Brett, Ambulance 61 (Episodes 1–6)
- David Eigenberg as Lieutenant Christopher Herrmann, Engine Company 51
- Joe Minoso as Firefighter Joe Cruz, Squad Company 3
- Christian Stolte as Firefighter Randall "Mouch" McHolland, Truck Company 81
- Miranda Rae Mayo as Lieutenant Stella Kidd, Truck Company 81
- Alberto Rosende as Firefighter Blake Gallo, Truck Company 81 (Episode 1)
- Daniel Kyri as Firefighter Darren Ritter, Engine Company 51
- Hanako Greensmith as Paramedic in Charge Violet Mikami, Ambulance 61
- Eamonn Walker as Deputy District Chief Wallace Boden, District 4

=== Recurring ===
- Randy Flagler as Firefighter Harold Capp, Squad Company 3
- Anthony Ferraris as Firefighter Tony Ferraris, Squad Company 3
- Jake Lockett as Firefighter Sam Carver, Truck Company 81
- Rome Flynn as Firefighter Derrick Gibson
- Robyn Coffin as Cindy Herrmann, Christopher's wife
- Kristen Gutoskie as Chloe Cruz, Joe Cruz's wife
- Carlos S. Sanchez as Javier Cruz, Joe’s adopted son
- Katelynn Shennett as Firefighter Kylie Estevez
- Laura Allen as Paramedic Chief Danya Robinson
- Jocelyn Hudon as Paramedic Lizzie Novak
- Michael Bradway as Firefighter Jack Damon

=== Special guest stars ===
- Jesse Spencer as Captain Matthew Casey

=== Crossover characters ===
- Amy Morton as Desk Sergeant Trudy Platt
- Dominic Rains as Dr. Crockett Marcel

== Episodes ==
No. overall	No. in season	Title	Directed by	Written by	Original release date	Prod. code	U.S. viewers (millions)
240	1	"Barely Gone"	Reza Tabrizi	Andrea Newman	January 17, 2024	1201	7.00
Severide gets an icy reception upon returning to Firehouse 51. Kidd and Herrmann fight about Ritter. Firehouse 51 says goodbye to one of its own. Firehouse 17 temporarily shares quarters with 51. Both teams work together to investigate a series of explosions and Severide and the others band together after Herrmann gets hit by one of the explosions.
241	2	"Call Me McHolland"	Lisa Demaine	Matt Whitney	January 24, 2024	1202	6.58
Looking to change his image, Mouch tries to change his nickname to leave a better legacy. Cruz looks into taking the Lieutenant’s test and leaving 51 without Severide's knowledge. Meanwhile, Ritter urges Herrmann to go to the doctor out of fear that Herrmann may lose his hearing following the explosion. Brett turns to Tony to help her look for a wedding venue.
242	3	"Trapped"	Reza Tabrizi	Michael Gilvary	January 31, 2024	1203	6.73
Brett and Violet deal with a possible domestic disturbance situation when a young woman asks for help. Meanwhile, 51 welcomes the newest member to the Truck Co. Kidd begins to have doubts when Severide starts yet another arson case that might take him out of Chicago again. Herrmann receives his hearing test results.
243	4	"The Little Things"	Lisa Robinson	Victor Teran	February 7, 2024	1204	6.30
Kidd grows concerned about a situation about a little girl possibly starting fires on purpose. Boden's former stepson asks Boden for help to get his mother out of jail. Brett must bring her daughter to the firehouse after her babysitter canceled and Cruz begins to feel offended when he still has not received an invitation to Brett and Casey's wedding.
244	5	"On the Hook"	Matt Earl Beesley	Matt Demblowski	February 21, 2024	1205	6.40
Brett and Violet look into what could have caused their defibrillator to malfunction while at a call, and deal with the fallout. Meanwhile, Carver digs deeper into Gibson's life before he joined the CFD. Herrmann looks for a home for a recliner that he found while at a call.
245	6	"Port in the Storm"	Reza Tabrizi	Andrea Newman	February 28, 2024	1206	6.58
Firehouse 51 welcomes back some familiar faces as they prepare to say goodbye to Brett and celebrate Brett's and Casey's wedding. Violet scambles to decorate Brett's wedding venue and receives a promotion to paramedic in charge. A call at the expo center turns into a hostage situation for Brett. Stella grows concerned that she has not heard from Severide, who was supposed to return to Chicago.
246	7	"Red Flag"	William Eichler	Matt Whitney	March 20, 2024	1207	6.33
After discovering money hidden in the floorboards of a burning house during a call, Severide tries to protect a girl who is in trouble with a local gang. Meanwhile, Violet clashes with her new partner after he undermines her at their first call together. Ritter contemplates a new relationship. Mouch goes out of his way to dismiss a parking citation.
247	8	"All the Dark"	Paul McCrane	Natalie Wood	March 27, 2024	1208	6.26
Chief Boden looks into Paramedic Chief Robinson after Severide and Violet both receive complaints from the new paramedic. Meanwhile, after a call over a hazardous-materials situation at a dialysis clinic, Stella discovers her academy trainer is a patient and later learns he might be a victim of medical malpractice. Carver grows more concerned about Gibson's recent erratic behavior. Herrmann and Mouch pull pranks against each other.
248	9	"Something About Her"	Heather Cappiello	Victor Teran	April 3, 2024	1209	6.07
Severide and OFI investigator Van Meter look into a case following a call of a music studio building on fire with burn patterns seemingly suspicious. Meanwhile, Violet meets her new partner on Ambulance 61; Kylie works a floater shift on 81 and helps Boden’s stepson James with his new desk job. Mouch deals with boundary issues with one of his paramedicine clients.
249	10	"The Wrong Guy"	Reza Tabrizi	Danielle Nicki	May 1, 2024	1210	6.05
With Boden taking a leave of absence, Severide fills in for him as ranking officer. Meanwhile, Cruz has doubts when Javi’s uncle resurfaces to reconnect. Stella looks into trying to save her “Girls on Fire” program. Violet lends a hand to try to get Novak to join 51 permanently. Also, Herrmann asks for Ritter’s help with tracking his children on his cell phone.
250	11	"Inside Man"	Brenna Malloy	Matt Whitney	May 8, 2024	1211	6.08
Kidd and the rest of 51 race against time to find their truck after it was stolen from the firehouse, only to discover that Severide was kidnapped inadvertently. Meanwhile, Ritter considers going to Kidd about Damon's intentions as 51's newest replacement and whether to tell the firehouse he is dating a police officer. Cruz and his wife Chloe consider couples counseling.
251	12	"Under Pressure"	Lisa Demaine	Jessica D. Johnson	May 15, 2024	1212	5.86
After witnessing Lennox make a bad decision on a call, Violet and Severide consider turning him in despite the risk of rising more tension with Paramedic Chief Robinson. Meanwhile, Cruz and Chloe’s marriage comes to a head when Chloe asks Cruz to reduce his hours. Also, Tony and Capp compete with another squad to break a world record.
252	13	"Never Say Goodbye"	Reza Tabrizi	Andrea Newman	May 22, 2024	1213	5.79
Boden makes a life-changing decision when it comes to finally taking down Robinson for her impending promotion and considers Herrmann to be promoted as the next Battalion chief of 51. Meanwhile, a call comes in at a restaurant in which a father was abusing his child brings up bad memories for Damon. Violet and Carver's relationship takes a downturn. Mouch struggles with the new truck for 81.

== Production ==
=== Casting ===
On October 31, 2023, NBC announced that Taylor Kinney would return to the series following his leave of absence. On December 13, 2023, NBC announced that Rome Flynn would join the series in a recurring role as 51's latest recruit with a dark past. On March 29, 2024, NBC announced that Jocelyn Hudon would join the series as the newest paramedic replacing Kara Killmer in a recurring role with the potential to be upgraded to a series regular. On April 3, 2024, it was announced that newcomer Michael Bradway would replace Rome Flynn, who left the series after six episodes as 51’s newest firefighter Jack Damon. Bradway's role also has the potential to be a series regular in the upcoming thirteenth season. His first appearance was on the tenth episode of the season.

=== Kara Killmer's, Alberto Rosende's and Eamonn Walker's exits ===
On November 16, 2023, it was announced that longtime cast member Kara Killmer, who portrayed paramedic-in-charge Sylvie Brett, would leave the show midway through the twelfth season. Her final episode aired on February 28, 2024. On November 30, 2023, it was also announced that Alberto Rosende, who portrayed firefighter Blake Gallo since the eighth season, would leave the series as well. His final appearance was in the season premiere. It has been reported that both exits were creative decisions. On May 7, 2024, it was announced that original cast member Eamonn Walker who has portrayed Wallace Boden, would leave the series at the end of the twelfth season. It was later stated that Walker will return to the series in a recurring role.

== Ratings ==
Viewership and ratings per episode of Chicago Fire season 12
No.	Title	Air date	Rating (18–49)	Viewers (millions)	DVR (18–49)	DVR viewers (millions)	Total (18–49)	Total viewers (millions)
1	"Barely Gone"	January 17, 2024	0.6	7.00	—N/a	—N/a	—N/a	—N/a
2	"Call Me McHolland"	January 24, 2024	0.6	6.58	—N/a	—N/a	—N/a	—N/a
3	"Trapped"	January 31, 2024	0.5	6.73	—N/a	—N/a	—N/a	—N/a
4	"The Little Things"	February 7, 2024	0.5	6.30	—N/a	—N/a	—N/a	—N/a
5	"On the Hook"	February 21, 2024	0.5	6.40	—N/a	—N/a	—N/a	—N/a
6	"Port in the Storm"	February 28, 2024	0.6	6.58	—N/a	—N/a	—N/a	—N/a
7	"Red Flag"	March 20, 2024	0.5	6.33	—N/a	—N/a	—N/a	—N/a
8	"All the Dark"	March 27, 2024	0.5	6.26	—N/a	—N/a	—N/a	—N/a
9	"Something About Her"	April 3, 2024	0.4	6.07	—N/a	—N/a	—N/a	—N/a
10	"The Wrong Guy"	May 1, 2024	0.4	6.05	—N/a	—N/a	—N/a	—N/a
11	"Inside Man"	May 8, 2024	0.5	6.08	—N/a	—N/a	—N/a	—N/a
12	"Under Pressure"	May 15, 2024	0.5	5.86	—N/a	—N/a	—N/a	—N/a
13	"Never Say Goodbye"	May 22, 2024	0.4	5.79	—N/a	—N/a	—N/a	—N/a
