= This Summer Will Be Different =

Upcoming Canadian television series

- Genre: Romantic drama
- Created by: Dane Clark; Linsey Stewart
- Based on: This Summer Will Be Different by Carley Fortune
- Starring: Sophie Nélisse; Francesca Reale; Roby Attal
- Country of origin: Canada
- Original language: English

Production
- Executive producers: Dane Clark; Linsey Stewart; Carley Fortune; Jennifer Kawaja; Elise Cousineau; Samantha Levine; Karen Maine
- Producer: Anna Beben
- Production company: Sphere Media

Original release
- Network: Netflix

This Summer Will Be Different is an upcoming Canadian romantic drama television series created by Dane Clark and Linsey Stewart for Netflix. It is based on the 2024 novel of the same name by Carley Fortune.

== Premise ==
The series follows Lucy Ashby, a young woman navigating her 20s and her first real love with her best friend’s brother.

== Cast ==
=== Main ===
- Sophie Nélisse as Lucy Ashby
- Francesca Reale as Bridget Clark
- Roby Attal as Felix "Wolf" Clark

=== Recurring ===
- Jordan Rodrigues as Miles Lam
- Jude Wilson as Zach
- Natalie Brown as Christine
- James Tupper as Ken
- Tom Barnett as Peter
- Celia Owen as Joy
- Malin Akerman as Aunt Stacy
- Megan Follows as Cheryl
- Nadine Bhabha as Farah
- Matias Lucas as Carter

== Production ==
=== Development ===
In March 2026, it was announced that Netflix had ordered a 10-episode series adaptation of Carley Fortune's This Summer Will Be Different with Dane Clark and Linsey Stewart as co-creators and co-showrunners. Clark and Stewart would also executive produce the series alongside Fortune, Jennifer Kawaja, Elise Cousineau, and Samantha Levine for Sphere Media. In August 2026, it was announced that Karen Maine had joined the series as an executive producer and would direct the pilot episode. Other directors of the series include Jasmin Mozaffari and Fab Filippo.

=== Casting ===
In July 2026, Sophie Nélisse, Francesca Reale, and Roby Attal were cast as the leads. The following month, Jordan Rodrigues, Jude Wilson, Natalie Brown, James Tupper, Tom Barnett, and Celia Owen joined the cast in supporting roles. In September 2026, Malin Akerman, Megan Follows, Nadine Bhabha, and Matias Lucas rounded out the cast.

=== Filming ===
Principal photography began on Prince Edward Island on July 29, 2026, and concluded on October 23, 2026.
