= Statement of Regret =

- Written by: Kwame Kwei-Armah
- Characters: Kwaku Mackenzie; Michael Akinbola; Idrissa Adebayo; Issimama Banjoko; Lola Mackenzie; Kwaku Mackenzie Junior; Val; Adrian Mackenzie; Soby
- Original language: English
- Series: Elmina's Kitchen; Fix Up
- Setting: The offices of a Black policy think tank

Premiere
- Date premiered: 14 November 2007
- Place premiered: United Kingdom
- Official website

Statement of Regret is a play by black British actor and playwright Kwame Kwei-Armah. The play premiered in the National Theatre's Cottesloe Theatre, London, in 2007, directed by Jeremy Herrin.

== Synopsis ==
Kwaku Mackenzie, founder of a Black policy think tank, hits the bottle after his father's death. As media interest in the once dynamic Institute fades, his team grows fractious and then, disastrously, he favours a young Oxford scholar over his own devastated son. When, in a vain attempt to regain influence, he publicly champions division within the Black community, the consequences are shattering.

== Original cast ==
- Don Warrington - Kwaku Mackenzie
- Colin McFarlane - Michael Akinbola
- Chu Omambala - Idrissa Adebayo
- Angel Coulby - Issimama Banjoko
- Ellen Thomas - Lola Mackenzie
- Javone Prince - Kwaku Mackenzie Junior
- Trevor Laird - Val
- Clifford Samuel - Adrian Mackenzie
- Oscar James - Soby
