= Mercenaries (2011 film) =

- Film poster
- Directed by: Paris Leonti
- Screenplay by: Paris Leonti
- Produced by: Luc Chaudhary
- Starring: Billy Zane; Robert Fucilla; Rob James-Collier
- Cinematography: Philip Robertson
- Edited by: Anthony Willis; Iain Mitchel
- Music by: Haim Frank Ilfman
- Production companies: ABC Films; Angry Badger Pictures
- Distributed by: Kaleidoscope/ Lionsgate
- Release dates: May 2011 (Ibiza); 27 January 2012 (United Kingdom)
- Running time: 90 minutes
- Country: United Kingdom
- Languages: English; Serbocroatian

Mercenaries is a 2011 British action-adventure war film written and directed by Paris Leonti and starring Billy Zane, Robert Fucilla and Kirsty Mitchell.

== Plot ==
Andy Marlow is an ex-British S.A.S serviceman turned mercenary who is working covertly at an observation post in the Balkans after a military coup has resulted in the assassination of the Prime Minister of Serbia. The coup has been instigated by Olodan Cracovic, the ex-commander of the Croatian Army and wanted war criminal. During the unrest, Olodan’s troops raided the U.S. Embassy and has taken the U.S Ambassador and his aide captives. The decision is taken to send in mercenaries to carry out the top secret rescue.

Marlow and his team are sent into Srebrenica under the cover of darkness. US Armed Forces personnel posing as United Nations peacekeepers are playing a support role, but cannot take part in active operations. Covertly, Andy and his team infiltrate Olodan’s headquarters, taking him captive and releasing the Ambassador and his aide. However the rescue is far from over. Now they are faced with transporting them back to a safe area twenty five miles south where US troops are waiting. With Olodan’s right-hand man in pursuit, their mission takes an unexpected turn. They find themselves outnumbered, outgunned and fighting what could easily be a losing battle.

== Cast ==
- Billy Zane as Colonel Torida
- Robert Fucilla as Andy Marlow
- Kirsty Mitchell as Beatrice
- Rob James-Collier as Callum
- Antony Byrne as Olodan Gragovic
- Vas Blackwood as Zac
- Geoff Bell as Vladko
- Andrew Harwood Mills as Grigory

== Release ==
The film was set for a limited UK theatrical release date on 27 January 2012. It was announced as one of the official selection of films for the Ibiza Film Festival in 2011, and also had a showing the same year at the Cannes Film Festival.

== Reception ==
Having had several festival showings and been released in Germany, Mercenaries has received many reviews, most of which have been negative. Total Film gave a rating of one of five stars, particularly criticising the production values, "Gunshots sound like they were sampled off a videogame, muzzle flashes make the whole screen flash". David Hughes from Empire gave a similar review, however was not as critical, with a two out of five star rating. He said that the film had sufficient "fire power" but lacked any "substantial plot". Tom Huddleston from TimeOut singled out Rob James-Collier's performance, his accent specifically, saying he was "trying on a Texan accent so hysterically ripe he must have learned it from watching ‘Foghorn Leghorn’ cartoons". Overall he gave a one star rating out of five.

Not all reviews were so universally negative, some reviewers singled out particular actors performances such as Martin Daniel Mcdonagh from The Hollywood News who gave a two out of five star rating, praising Robert Fucilla's performance. Dan Collacott from the online site Close-upFilm, in contrast to the review in TimeOut, said that Rob James-Collier "is the most convincing mercenary of the bunch"
