= Safe House (2025 film) =

American thriller film

- Theatrical release poster
- Directed by: Jamie Marshall
- Written by: Leon Langford
- Produced by: Lucas Jarach; Timothy C. Sullivan; Tim Sullivan; Brian Pitt; Nicolas Chartier; Jonathan Deckter
- Starring: Lucien Laviscount; Hannah John-Kamen; Ethan Embry; Lewis Tan; Holt McCallany; Adam Levy
- Cinematography: Michael Merriman
- Edited by: Tommy Aagaard; Evan Schrodek
- Music by: Sam Ewing
- Production companies: Green Light Pictures; Voltage Pictures
- Distributed by: Vertical
- Release date: October 31, 2025
- Running time: 90 minutes
- Country: United States
- Language: English

Safe House is a 2025 American action thriller film directed by Jamie Marshall and written by Leon Langford. It stars Lucien Laviscount, Hannah John-Kamen, Ethan Embry, Lewis Tan, Holt McCallany, and Adam Levy.

== Plot ==
In Los Angeles, a motorcade transporting Vice President Davis is attacked by terrorists. Davis is evacuated, but Secret Service agent Choi’s colleagues are killed and he escapes with the backup nuclear football. General Marshall initiates code Whiskey Mike Delta and orders Choi to shelter in place at a CIA safehouse managed by “housekeeper” Anderson. He is joined by USSS agent Reeves, DoD liaison agent Owens, paranoid DHS agent Sorello and veteran CIA agent Halton.

Marshall tells Choi he will be extracted and not to reveal what he is carrying to the others. However, after tracing the attack's detonator signal to the safehouse, it is placed in lockdown. Owens and Reeves explain they work with DoD Special Projects and were to deliver C49, a classified device, to Davis. Civilians are evacuated and the Governor declares martial law in the city to locate the attackers. The safehouse is attacked by terrorists, who kill Reeves before being neutralised. Owens discovers the exits are rigged with Semtex. They torture a surviving terrorist who says they have been contained purposefully before taking cyanide and detonating a concealed IED. Sorello accuses Anderson of working with the terrorists.

Halton has Anderson detained, and demands Choi reveal he has the football. Owens confesses that C49 generates Gold Codes, meaning the terrorists targeted them all to obtain both. Another wave of terrorists attack, injuring Choi and Sorello. Sorello releases Anderson to assist, but he kills him and Choi. Owens discovers from CCTV that Anderson killed the real “housekeeper” before they arrived. Anderson kills Halton, and tells an injured Owens his real name is Elijah King. He explains his group is on a crusade for disillusioned veterans, planning to launch an ICBM from Montana at Washington, D.C. and remake America for the better.

Owens is able to disarm King and his colleague, shooting them both with the deceased Reeve’s sidearm and aborting the launch. However, it is Marshall who is revealed to be in charge of the conspiracy, coordinating the attack from the same building. He destroys his operations room with explosives and leaves on foot, unaware that Owens is following him with her weapon drawn.

== Cast ==
- Lucien Laviscount as Nathan Anderson / Elijah King, a former Marine who serves as “housekeeper” of Safe House 5102
- Hannah John-Kamen as Mia Angelica Owens, a Department of Defense special agent and former US Army Ranger liaising with the Secret Service
- Ethan Embry as Sorello, a paranoid Department of Homeland Security special agent
- Lewis Tan as Choi, a Secret Service special agent assigned to the Vice Presidential Protection Detail
- Holt McCallany as Halton, a veteran CIA agent
- Adam Levy as Victor, a terrorist
- Brett Cullen as Marshall, a General in the United States Army
- Michael Bradway as Daniel Reeves, a Secret Service special agent liaising with the Department of Defense

== Production ==
By January 2025, the film directed by Jamie Marshall was in post-production, with Vertical acquiring the distribution rights. Lucien Laviscount, Hannah John-Kamen, Ethan Embry, Lewis Tan, Holt McCallany, and Adam Levy had rounded out the cast.

== Release ==
Safe House was released in the United States on October 31, 2025.
