= Summer of 69 (film) =

- Release poster
- Directed by: Jillian Bell
- Written by: Jillian Bell; Liz Nico; Jules Byrne
- Produced by: Jeremy Garelick; Will Phelps; Molle DeBartolo; Jillian Bell; Breanna Bell-Singer; Adam Goodman; Matt Skiena; Lucas Carter
- Starring: Chloe Fineman; Sam Morelos; Matt Cornett
- Cinematography: Maria Rusche
- Edited by: Casey Brooks
- Music by: Matt Bowen
- Production companies: American High; Dichotomy; Champagne Video
- Distributed by: Hulu
- Release dates: March 13, 2025 (SXSW); May 9, 2025 (United States)
- Running time: 100 minutes
- Country: United States
- Language: English

Summer of 69 is a 2025 American sex comedy film directed by Jillian Bell in her directorial debut, and written by Bell, Liz Nico, and Jules Byrne. It stars Chloe Fineman, Sam Morelos, and Matt Cornett.

The film premiered at the 2025 South by Southwest Film & TV Festival and released in the United States on Hulu on May 9, 2025.

== Plot ==
Abby Flores is a socially awkward high school senior with a long-standing crush on her classmate Max. After finding out that Max has broken up with his longtime girlfriend Mercedes, she decides to take the opportunity to win his heart. She hears that Max is "obsessed" with the 69 sex position, and worries about her own lack of sexual experience. In order to learn more, she visits local strip club Diamond Dolls, taking an instant liking to stripper Santa Monica, but is ejected for being under 18. Santa Monica considers Diamond Dolls a second home, with club owner Betty acting as a mother figure to the girls working there. Betty announces to the dancers that Diamond Dolls will be closing due to her $20,000 of unpaid debt. Santa Monica resolves to figure out a way to earn the money and become a co-owner of the club along with Betty.

With her parents out of town for a week, Abby hires Santa Monica to come to her house to dance. When Santa Monica arrives, Abby asks her to act as a sexual "coach", agreeing to pay her $20,000 using the money she earns from live streaming video games. Santa Monica agrees, and begins to give Abby practical instruction, such as walking in high heels and sex education, as well as tips to improve her self-confidence. Santa Monica discovers that rival club owner Rick Richards is the one Betty owes money to, and that he will take possession of the club if the debt is not paid within a week.

Abby and Santa Monica continue to spend time together and become closer. Abby purchases a vibrator with Santa Monica's help, and gets a lesson in stripping from the dancers at Diamond Dolls. In turn, she helps Santa Monica prepare for her high school reunion, which she is nervous about attending due to her unglamorous occupation and jealousy towards former classmate Robin. While hanging out with Santa Monica, Abby continually puts off her scheduled streams, resulting in her not having the promised $20,000. After failing to come up with any other way to get the money, she meets up with Santa Monica to tell her, but the two instead watch Risky Business together. Later, Santa Monica tells Abby that she does not think Abby is ready to have sex with Max, which offends Abby. She reveals that she cannot pay Santa Monica, and the two fight, ending their friendship.

When Max cancels his planned house party, Abby offers her house as a venue. She ends up in her bedroom with Max, who confesses that he is interested in Abby, and is a fan of her streams. Abby realizes that she is not ready for sex, and tells Max that she cannot 69 with him, only for Max to reveal that the rumor about his obsession is a lie: he is actually a virgin, due to his ex-girlfriend's staunch Christianity. Meanwhile, Santa Monica attends her high school reunion. She admits that she is a stripper to Robin, who in turn shares about her failing realty business and unfaithful husband. The two become friends, and Robin encourages Santa Monica to reconcile with Abby.

When Santa Monica arrives at Abby's house to apologize, she finds out from Max that Abby and all of the party attendees over 18 have gone to Diamond Dolls. There, Abby performs an awkward striptease dressed as Tom Cruise’s character from Risky Business. She accepts donations from her classmates, the club patrons, and her live stream audience to pay off Diamond Dolls' debt. When the collected money still ends up $4,300 short, Robin arrives and agrees to cover the difference, since her husband is a regular patron of the club. A furious Rick Richards is ejected from the club.

Abby and Santa Monica apologize to each other, and Abby and Max share a kiss, Abby's first. The next morning, Abby and Santa Monica talk in Abby's backyard, only for her parents to arrive home, the house still ruined from the party the night before. Demanding an explanation, Abby tells them she made a friend.

== Cast ==
- Chloe Fineman as Santa Monica
- Sam Morelos as Abby Flores
- Matt Cornett as Max Warren
- Charlie Day as Rick Richards
- Natalie Morales as Robin Goode
- Alex Moffat as DJ Don
- Paula Pell as Betty
- Liza Koshy as Angel
- Nicole Byer as Destiny

== Production ==
The film is Jillian Bell's feature directorial debut. Principal photography took place from July to August 2024 in Syracuse, New York.

== Release ==
Summer of 69 premiered at the 2025 South by Southwest Film & TV Festival on March 13, 2025, and was released on Hulu on May 9, 2025.

== Reception ==
On the review aggregator website Rotten Tomatoes, 89% of 37 critics' reviews are positive, with an average rating of 6.9/10. The website's consensus reads: "Jillian Bell's raunchy, sex-positive debut captures the essence of '90s teen comedies while imparting a deeper sense of heart and distinguishable personality for the Summer of 69." Metacritic, which uses a weighted average, assigned the film a score of 64 out of 100, based on 10 critics, indicating "generally favorable" reviews.
