= Chicago Fire season 13 =

Season of television series

Chicago Fire
- Season 13
- Showrunner: Andrea Newman
- Starring: Taylor Kinney; David Eigenberg; Joe Minoso; Christian Stolte; Miranda Rae Mayo; Daniel Kyri; Hanako Greensmith; Jake Lockett; Jocelyn Hudon; Dermot Mulroney
- No. of episodes: 22

Release
- Original network: NBC
- Original release: September 25, 2024 – May 21, 2025

Season chronology
- ← Previous; Season 12 Next → Season 14

The thirteenth season of Chicago Fire, an American drama television series with executive producer Dick Wolf, and producers Derek Haas and Matt Olmstead, was ordered on March 21, 2024. The season premiered on September 25, 2024.

== Cast and characters ==
=== Main ===
- Taylor Kinney as Lieutenant Kelly Severide, Squad Company 3
- David Eigenberg as Lieutenant Christopher Herrmann, Engine Company 51
- Joe Minoso as Firefighter Joe Cruz, Squad Company 3
- Christian Stolte as Firefighter Randall "Mouch" McHolland, Truck Company 81
- Miranda Rae Mayo as Lieutenant Stella Kidd, Truck Company 81
- Daniel Kyri as Firefighter Darren Ritter, Engine Company 51
- Hanako Greensmith as Paramedic in Charge Violet Mikami, Ambulance 61
- Jake Lockett as Firefighter Sam Carver, Truck Company 81
- Jocelyn Hudon as Paramedic Lizzie Novak, Ambulance 61
- Dermot Mulroney as Battalion Chief Dom Pascal, District 4

=== Recurring ===
- Randy Flagler as Firefighter Harold Capp, Squad Company 3
- Anthony Ferraris as Firefighter Tony Ferraris, Squad Company 3
- Michael Bradway as Firefighter Jack Damon, Truck Company 81
- KaDee Strickland as Monica Pascal
- Robyn Coffin as Cindy Herrmann
- Tim Hopper as Captain Tom Van Meter

=== Guest ===
- Eamonn Walker as Deputy Chief Commissioner Wallace Boden

== Episodes ==
No. overall	No. in season	Title	Directed by	Written by	Original release date	Prod. code	U.S. viewers (millions)
253	1	"A Monster in the Field"	Reza Tabrizi	Andrea Newman	September 25, 2024	1301	5.60
Firehouse 51 welcomes new Battalion Chief Dom Pascal as Boden's replacement which turns icy as Severide and Stella keep a watchful eye as he begins to make changes to the firehouse while Hermann welcomes the changes. Meanwhile, Novak suspects a possible suicide of a family after a young daughter admits she heard that her father wanted to intentionally crash their car. Cruz grows suspect of Severide's bond with his long lost brother Damon. Also, Violet learns that Carver has moved on from their relationship after trying to make amends.
254	2	"Ride the Blade"	Paul McCrane	Matt Whitney	October 2, 2024	1302	5.65
After Damon disobeys a direct order, Stella turns to Severide for advice on how to discipline him. Meanwhile, Herrmann confides in Mouch about not taking the Battalion Chief test. Novak encourages Violet to get back out in the dating scene following her break up with Carver. Also, Pascal receives surprising news concerning his wife.
255	3	"All Kinds of Crazy"	Reza Tabrizi	Nancy Kiu	October 9, 2024	1303	5.43
Severide and the OFI investigate a kitchen fire at a restaurant that 51 responded to of possible arson with Ritter getting injured at the same call. Meanwhile, Pascal questions Stella's leadership referring to all the turnovers on truck after she requests to transfer Damon out of 51. Also, Violet receives bad vibes from Carver's new girlfriend.
256	4	"Through the Skin"	Brenna Mallory	Victor Teran	October 16, 2024	1304	5.64
Violet's job as a paramedic is put in jeopardy after bypassing protocol and performing an emergency c-section on a patient who was deceased at the scene. Meanwhile, Severide reaches out to Damon after he is transferred out of 51. Stella struggles with trying to find a replacement on truck. Also, Cruz asks for Capp and Tony's help with finding his son's stolen bike.
257	5	"Down the Rabbit Hole"	Lisa Demaine	Alec Wells	October 23, 2024	1305	5.90
Stella and Severide raise suspicions when a trucking company has many complaints of car accidents involving their trucks with six in the past three months. Meanwhile, Carver is torn between hanging out with Violet and trying to keep his relationship with his new girlfriend alive. Hermann asks for Kylie's help with getting new radios on the ladder truck. Also, Ritter asks for Novak's help to cover up evidence after the former had broken Pascal's trophy on his shelf in his office.
258	6	"Birds of Prey"	Matt Earl Beesley	Danielle Nicki	November 6, 2024	1306	5.77
Severide and Pascal work with the Illinois State Police after discovering illegal guns that were 3D printed while at a call of a fire. Meanwhile, Stella gives Carver an ultimatum as his attitude grows worse. Violet navigates a new relationship. Also, Mouch gets attacked by a rogue pigeon at the firehouse.
259	7	"Untouchable"	Lisa Robinson	Matt Whitney	November 13, 2024	1307	5.72
Severide and Pascal continue to investigate the arson in order to gather evidence to take down Captain Bishop. Meanwhile, Cruz helps Mouch with preparing to take the Lieutenant's test. Novak asks for Violet's help with getting a new paramedic program off the ground. Also, Carver's relationship with Tori begins to sour as he begins to refocus on work.
260	8	"Quicksand"	Heather Cappiello	Andrea Newman	November 20, 2024	1308	5.72
Herrmann and Mouch help each other as they prepare to take a rank test to become Captain and Lieutenant respectively. While as acting Lieutenant, Cruz receives mysterious omens of him and his brother Leon's past in the gang. Meanwhile, Novak is horrified after a call of a man trying to hang himself. Carver watches a dog from a call of a man who injured his leg. Also, Ritter considers moving in with his boyfriend and Pascal tries to reassure his wife that they are protected from his past in Miami.
261	9	"A Favor"	Reza Tabrizi	Nancy Kiu	January 8, 2025	1309	5.77
One of Cruz's brother Leon's former gang members returns to Chicago and blackmails Cruz for a favor involving going undercover as firefighters. Meanwhile, newly promoted Lieutenant Mouch goes above and beyond to find family of a man who died alone. Severide is asked to teach new students at OFI which annoys Pascal who questions about rank at the firehouse. Violet and Novak throw a celebratory party for Mouch and Herrmann after they are promoted to Lieutenant and Captain respectively.
262	10	"Chaos Theory"	William Eichler	Alec Wells	January 22, 2025	1310	5.64
Severide and Pascal are forced to look into a case from 12 years ago involving Cruz and his brother when he was formally in the gang after a witness comes forward. Meanwhile, Kidd helps a teacher victim cope with the trauma from a previous call. Also, Carver asks for Violet's help on a litigation case against him.
263	11	"In the Trenches: Part I"	Reza Tabrizi	Victor Teran	January 29, 2025	1311	6.31
Firehouse 51, the Chicago PD, and Gaffney work around the clock due to a major gas explosion at a high rise building that resulted in multiple casualties. Pascal and Severide investigate and believe it was a possible high stakes robbery. The episode ends with Desk Sergeant Trudy Platt getting severely wounded by one of the offenders & Stella and Officer Ruzek getting trapped in a subway car following a second explosion. Note : This episode begins a crossover event that continues on Chicago Med season 10 episode 11 and concludes on Chicago P.D. season 12 episode 11. The episode begins with a public service announcement featuring Chicago Fire star Dermot Mulroney, Chicago Med star S. Epatha Merkerson and Chicago P.D. star Jason Beghe, reminding viewers to donate to the American Red Cross amid the January 2025 Southern California wildfires.
264	12	"Relief Cut"	Paul McCrane	Matt Whitney	February 5, 2025	1312	5.92
Herrmann teams up with Kylie to investigate a series of missing fire hydrants following a call. Meanwhile, Stella's cousin makes a surprise visit and targets Severide with withholding Stella from seeing her family. Also, Ritter second guesses his placement on truck and reconsiders his relationship with his boyfriend.
265	13	"Born of Fire"	Lisa Robinson	Danielle Nicki	February 19, 2025	1313	5.89
After a daring call, Stella asks for Severide's help with a new "Girls on Fire" drill involving Squad. Meanwhile, Violet's former nemesis, Lenox returns for help after being charged for the same mistake he made while in the CFD. Hermann asks for Mouch's advice and expanding Molly's as a franchise. Also, Carver, now a recovering alcoholic, joins an AA meeting where he meets a member who instantly chummies up to him to a point where he breaks into Violet's home.
266	14	"Bar Time"	Sheelin Choksey	Nancy Kiu	February 26, 2025	1314	5.61
Novak's past begins to haunt her when her ex-fiancée shows up at the firehouse for ambulance 61's late night ride along. With Pascal on leave, Herrmann is overwhelmed with chief training paperwork and is reluctant to ask for help. Fearing that he had relapsed, Violet confronts Carver after being caught in a lie when he says he had been going to AA meetings leading to Carver asking Stella for a furlough to go to a treatment center. Also, with squad on an assignment without him, Cruz begins to get roped in a series of tasks.
267	15	"Too Close"	Pete Chatmon	Andrea Newman	March 5, 2025	1315	5.66
Damon reaches out to Severide for advice on how to handle a situation involving his new firehouse. Meanwhile, Severide and Stella are nervous about their adoption interview. Pascal informs Mouch about a Lieutenant spot that has opened at another firehouse and asks for advice about an anniversary gift for his wife. Also, Violet begins to feel the aftereffects of Carver's absence. The crew responds to a fatal auto accident and discover Monica Pascal is the victim.
268	16	"In the Rubble"	Matt Earl Beesley	Victor Teran	March 26, 2025	1316	5.73
Pascal searches for answers after the investigation into his wife, Monica's death concludes with no charges to the driver involved. Meanwhile, Violet works up the courage to write a letter to Carver as he continues his treatment. Also, Severide and Stella look into getting Jack Damon back to 51 permanently.
269	17	"A Beast Like This"	Chris DeAngelis	Julia Keimach	April 2, 2025	1317	5.86
Violet and Novak respond to a series of calls involving overdoses of steroids mixed with a sedative tied to a local gym. Meanwhile, Damon works with Herrmann as he settles in his new position at 51. Stella looks into a troubled teen with a mysterious past who signed up for her "Girls on Fire" program. Also, Pascal continues to mourn the loss of his wife Monica.
270	18	"Post-Mortem"	Reza Tabrizi	Alec Wells	April 16, 2025	1318	5.58
By the order of Commissioner Grissom, 51 undergoes an investigation by Deputy Commissioner Wallace Boden after a residential house fire rescue intensifies, which results in the hospitalization of one of their own in critical condition. Boden's investigation involves obtaining statements from Severide, Kidd, Hermann and Pascal relating their recollections of the series of decisions and events that finally led to leaving Damon behind during their emergency evacuation.
271	19	"Permanent Damage"	William Eichler	Matt Whitney	April 23, 2025	1319	5.28
Severide looks into a decade-old arson case when Stella rescued the now teenaged Natalie. Violet and Carver team up to track an unlicensed paramedic who botched a tracheostomy. Novak angles to room with Ritter after her rent is raised. Hermann inches closer to taking the Chief's exam. Damon learns from his doctor he will make a full recovery.
272	20	"Cut Me Open"	Lisa Robinson	Danielle Nicki Motley & Meridith Friedman	May 7, 2025	1320	5.41
Stella and Severide receive a call from their adoption agency about a woman that wants to put up her baby for adoption is going into labor recommends them. Things complicate quickly when it's revealed that the mother relapsed on drugs and that the baby might test positive for opioids. Meanwhile, with a staff shortage at 51, the firehouse are welcomed by an auditor.
273	21	"The Bad Guy"	Lisa Demaine	Victor Teran	May 14, 2025	1321	5.40
Pascal's career as a battalion chief is in jeopardy when 51 receives a call to a single car accident where the driver was also involved in the death of his wife, Monica. Severide discover that the car had been tampered with to set it up for failure. Meanwhile, Stella bonds with Natalie while on a roadtrip to Natalie's mother's place. Herrmann works up the courage to get a recommendation letter from Pascal to take the Chief's test. Also, Violet is interviewed after a story about her heroic work.
274	22	"It Had to End This Way"	Reza Tabrizi	Andrea Newman & Alec Wells	May 21, 2025	1322	5.61
Severide works with Pascal to try and clear his name when he is accused of attempted murder. Meanwhile, Stella tries to navigate a relationship with Natalie and her sister. Violet finally confesses her feelings for Carver only to discover that he had put in paperwork to move to Denver to continue his sobriety. Also, Herrmann prepares to take the Chief's test. The episode ends with Stella revealing to Severide that she is pregnant.

== Production ==
=== Casting ===
Both Jake Lockett and Jocelyn Hudon were promoted to series rgeulars for this season, with Dermot Mulroney also joining the cast as new chief Dom Pascal. Lockett and Hudon had been recurring cast members since Seasons 11 and 12 respectively.

As with the previous season, all of the main cast missed at least one episode due to budget reasons, which was a condition of the show being renewed

Jake Lockett and Daniel Kyri exited the series after this season due to budget cuts, with Lockett's final appearance being in the series finale and Kyri returning for two episodes in the next season for his exit storyline.

=== Crossover ===
In January 2025 the Chicago shows aired their first full crossover since 2019. The episodes, called "In the Trenches", were filmed in late 2024 and saw the casts of the three shows dealing with a gas explosion at a government building that also caused a subway car to be trapped underground. The episodes were described as a "three-hour action movie" by Anastasia Puglisi, Wolf Entertainment Executive Vice President and co-executive producer of the One Chicago series

== Ratings ==
Viewership and ratings per episode of Chicago Fire season 13
No.	Title	Air date	Rating (18–49)	Viewers (millions)	DVR (18–49)	DVR viewers (millions)	Total (18–49)	Total viewers (millions)	Ref.
1	"A Monster in the Field"	September 25, 2024	0.4	5.60	—N/a	—N/a	—N/a	—N/a	
2	"Ride the Blade"	October 2, 2024	0.4	5.65	—N/a	—N/a	—N/a	—N/a	
3	"All Kinds of Crazy"	October 9, 2024	0.4	5.43	—N/a	—N/a	—N/a	—N/a	
4	"Through the Skin"	October 16, 2024	0.4	5.64	0.2	2.03	0.6	7.67	
5	"Down the Rabbit Hole"	October 23, 2024	0.4	5.90	0.2	2.06	0.6	7.96	
6	"Birds of Prey"	November 6, 2024	0.5	5.77	0.3	2.28	0.7	8.05	
7	"Untouchable"	November 13, 2024	0.4	5.72	0.3	2.24	0.7	7.96	
8	"Quicksand"	November 20, 2024	0.4	5.72	0.2	2.06	0.6	7.78	
9	"A Favor"	January 8, 2025	0.4	5.77	0.2	1.82	0.6	7.58	
10	"Chaos Theory"	January 22, 2025	0.4	5.64	0.2	2.22	0.6	7.87	
11	"In the Trenches: Part I"	January 29, 2025	0.5	6.31	0.2	1.97	0.7	8.30	
12	"Relief Cut"	February 5, 2025	0.4	5.92	0.2	2.18	0.7	8.10	
13	"Born of Fire"	February 19, 2025	0.4	5.89	0.3	2.26	0.7	8.15	
14	"Bar Time"	February 26, 2025	0.4	5.61	0.3	2.24	0.7	7.85	
15	"Too Close"	March 5, 2025	0.3	5.66	0.2	2.06	0.6	7.74	
16	"In the Rubble"	March 26, 2025	0.3	5.73	0.2	2.27	0.6	7.99	
17	"A Beast Like This"	April 2, 2025	0.4	5.86	—N/a	—N/a	—N/a	—N/a	
18	"Post-Mortem"	April 16, 2025	0.3	5.58	—N/a	—N/a	—N/a	—N/a	
19	"Permanent Damage"	April 23, 2025	0.3	5.28	—N/a	—N/a	—N/a	—N/a	
20	"Cut Me Open"	May 7, 2025	0.3	5.41	—N/a	—N/a	—N/a	—N/a	
21	"The Bad Guy"	May 14, 2025	0.4	5.40	—N/a	—N/a	—N/a	—N/a	
22	"Up and Walking"	May 21, 2025	0.4	5.61	—N/a	—N/a	—N/a	—N/a	
