= Andrew Harwood Mills =

British actor

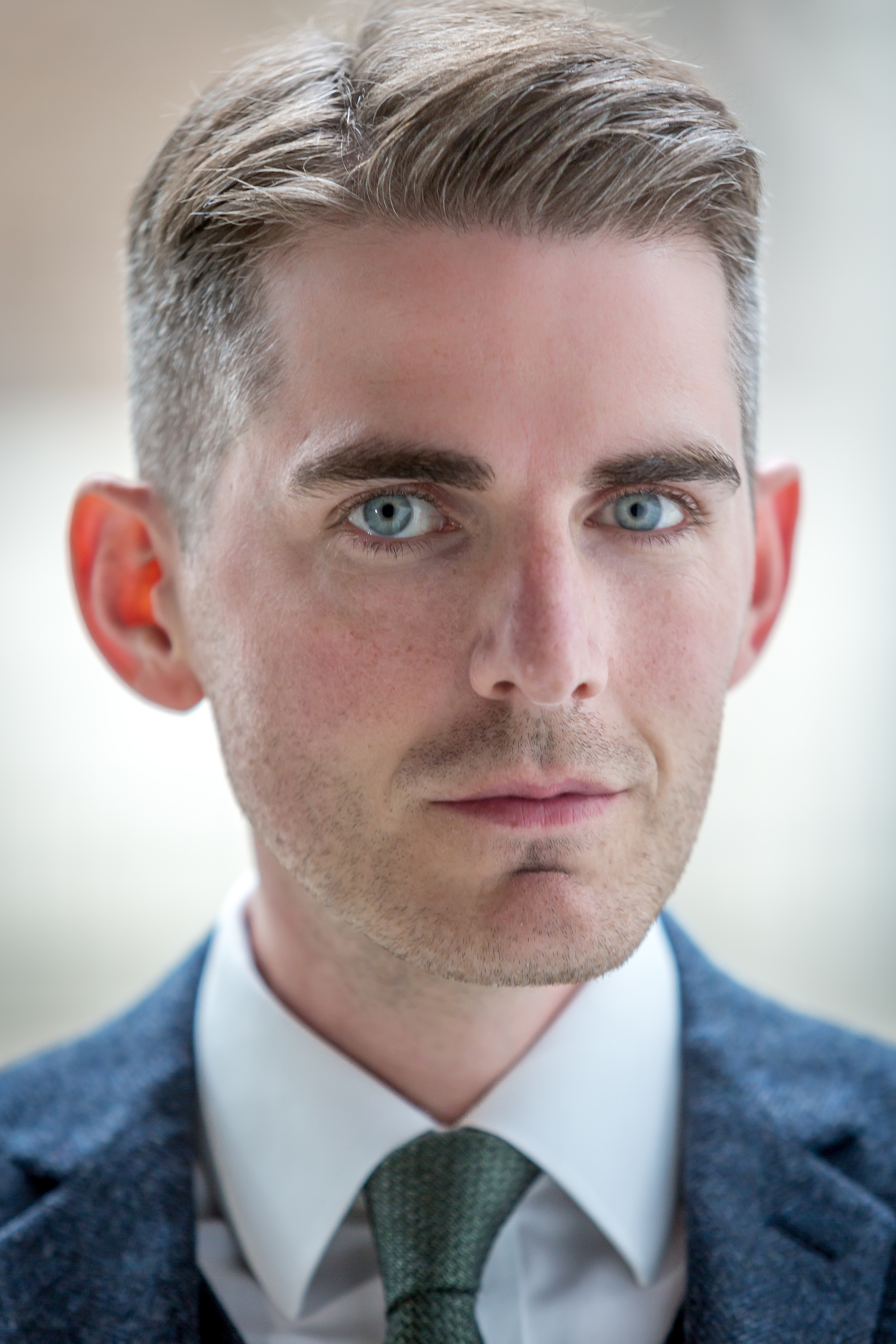
- Born: 5 January 1980 (age 46); Halifax, West Yorkshire, England
- Education: Royal Welsh College of Music & Drama
- Occupations: Actor, writer, musician,
- Years active: 2005–present
- Website: http://www.andrewharwoodmills.com

Andrew Harwood Mills (born 5 January 1980 in Halifax, West Yorkshire) is an English actor.

== Biography ==
=== Early life ===
Andrew Harwood Mills was born in Halifax, West Yorkshire. He grew up in the village of Heptonstall, famous for Ted Hughes, Sylvia Plath, and John Wesley among others. Heptonstall has been used many times as a location for various film and television productions including The Gemma Factor, and Happy Valley.

Andrew began acting at the Angles Theatre, Wisbech where he starred as the Tin Man in The Wiz and Captain Hardy in Journey's End by R. C. Sherriff.

Andrew studied acting at the Royal Welsh College of Music and Drama (RWCMD) in Cardiff graduating in 2005. He was sponsored by actors Richard Wilson, Tony Maudsley, Lesley Staples and Michael Burrell. He was in the same class as James Sutton, Zahra Ahmadi and Craig Gazey.

Andrew has appeared in numerous theatrical productions including Guys and Dolls, The Laramie Project and Merrily We Roll Along at the Sherman Cymru, Cardiff. He played the lead role of Leonard in Loon written by Katie Borland which premiered at the Theatre Royal Stratford East, the theatre made famous by Joan Littlewood.

Andrew is a grade 8 pianist.

=== Career ===
In 2009, he played Iago in Being Othello, a film adaption of Shakespeare's Othello, written and directed by the BAFTA nominated and award winning director Suri Krishnamma. Being Othello was premiered at BAFTA on 17 April 2009.

In 2010, he appeared in the feature film 4.3.2.1. directed by BAFTA award winner Noel Clarke. The film was released by Universal Pictures and starred Emma Roberts, Tamsin Egerton, Ophelia Lovibond, Mandy Patinkin, Kevin Smith and Sean Pertwee.

In 2011, Andrew starred in War Games: At the End of the Day directed by award winning Italian director Cosimo Alemà. It was released in Italian cinemas by Bolero and by Universal Pictures in the UK. The film premiered at the Raindance Film Festival where it competed for Best International Feature. The film also stars Sam Cohan, Valene Kane and Daniel Vivian.

Andrew stars in the debut music video for the single 'My Fault' by Senadee.

Andrew stars in the Mystery Jets music video for the single Someone Purer from the album Radlands.

Andrew stars in two music videos for the rock band Lacuna Coil. Both videos showcase tracks from the album Delirium and are directed by Cosimo Alemà. The first video, for the track "Blood Tears Dust" was released on Vevo on 22 March 2017. The second music video is for the track, "You Love Me 'Cause I Hate You".

== Filmography ==
Year	Title	Role	Notes
2009	Being Othello	Iago	Directed by BAFTA nominee Suri Krishnamma.
2010	4.3.2.1.	Phil	Written and directed by BAFTA winner Noel Clarke
2011	Mercenaries	Grigory	Directed by Paris Leonti and starring Billy Zane
2011	War Games: At the End of the Day	Chino	Directed by Cosimo Alema. Produced by Luca Legnani
2014	Gridiron UK	Sean	Directed by Gary Delaney and starring Paul Nicholas and Mem Ferda
2015	Retribution	Freddy	Directed by Danny Albury and David Bispham and starring Hugh Quarshie
2016	Brimstone	Man at Bar	Directed by Martin Koolhoven and starring Dakota Fanning, Guy Pearce and Kit Harington
2018	Victrix	Flaminius	Directed by Vic Armstrong and starring Rutger Hauer and Lily Cole

Music videos
Year	Title	Artist
2008	"My Fault"	Senadee
2012	"Someone Purer"	Mystery Jets
2012	"Ogni tanto"	Gianna Nannini
2017	"Blood Tears Dust"	Lacuna Coil
2017	"You Love Me 'Cause I Hate You"	Lacuna Coil
