= Cockneys vs Zombies =

2012 British zombie comedy film

- Theatrical teaser poster
- Directed by: Matthias Hoene
- Written by: James Moran; Lucas Roche
- Produced by: James Harris; Mark Lane; Matthias Hoene
- Starring: Harry Treadaway; Rasmus Hardiker; Michelle Ryan; Georgia King; Richard Briers; Honor Blackman; Alan Ford
- Cinematography: Daniel Bronks
- Edited by: Neil Farrell; John Palmer
- Music by: Jody Jenkins
- Production companies: Tea Shop Productions; Limelight; Molinare; StudioCanal; Kintop Pictures
- Distributed by: StudioCanal
- Release dates: 23 August 2012 (London FrightFest Film Festival); 31 August 2012 (United Kingdom)
- Running time: 87 minutes
- Country: United Kingdom
- Language: English
- Budget: £2.25 million (3,150,607.50$)
- Box office: $109,518 (worldwide)

Cockneys vs Zombies is a 2012 British zombie action comedy film directed by Matthias Hoene and written by James Moran and Lucas Roche. The plot centres on a group of Cockneys who arm themselves to rescue their grandfather and his friends from their retirement home as a zombie apocalypse takes place in the East End of London.

== Plot ==
In a building site being developed by Hartman Construction in the East End of London, two builders discover a catacomb from the year 1666, sealed by order of Charles II. Instead of alerting the construction crew or the authorities, they enter into the catacomb to search for treasure, but inadvertently awaken two zombies, which causes them to get attacked and bitten, becoming zombies themselves and starting a zombie outbreak in the area starting with the rest of the construction crew outside.

Elsewhere, Terry MacGuire and his younger brother Andy have planned a bank robbery so they can save their grandfather Ray's retirement home from being demolished. They recruit their cousin Katy, hopeless Davey Tuppence, and "Mental" Mickey, an unstable Iraq War veteran who has a metal plate in his forehead, and gather a large supply of weapons. During the robbery, the group find they have crashed an embezzlement deal between the bank manager and the head of Hartman Construction. Expecting to find a few hundred grand, they find themselves staring at £2,500,000 in cash. The bank manager had thought they were from Hartman due to their costumes, but quickly realises otherwise and presses an emergency button to summon the police. With the bank surrounded, Mickey takes charge of the escape plan and takes bank workers Emma and Clive hostage. However, upon attempting to leave the bank, the group find that the police have been killed by a growing horde of zombies. They escape in their van with the cash from the vault.

Meanwhile, at the retirement home, the zombies attack the residents. Ray and residents Peggy, former gangster Daryl, Doreen and Eric take refuge in the kitchen; Ray also rescues a resident named Hamish and gets him inside.

The MacGuires, Katy, Mickey, Davey and their hostages drive through a devastated East End until they reach their safe-house, where they stowed their car earlier. Mickey is bitten by a zombie, and the group finds out from the radio about the extent of the epidemic but don't know what to do with themselves. Emma pleads with Mickey and Davey to let her and Clive go, saying she does not care about their 'selfish' plans, and Katy tells her they are not robbing the bank for themselves, but to save the retirement home.

Mickey, growing more irrational and tired of the friendliness of his fellow bank robbers, decides to leave and takes Emma and Clive with him to a side room where he ties them up, and sits down to rest. Soon after, Mickey dies and turns into a zombie due to his previous bite wound. Realising shooting him in the head cannot kill Mickey due to the metal plate in his skull, Terry destroys him with a hand-grenade he confiscated earlier, shoving it into Mickey's mouth. In the subsequent confusion, Clive picks up Mickey's gun and insists on handing the group over to the police. However, he is promptly attacked and eaten by zombies who sneak up behind him while his attention is distracted, and reflexively shoots Davey dead by accident in the process.

The group pack the money and themselves into Terry's waiting car, intending to travel to the retirement home, but on the way they stop to look for Emma's younger sister. Terry and Emma find her as a zombie, but Emma decides not to kill her in case a cure is found. They set off again, deciding to arm themselves from Mickey's gun cache. However, the group realise that the car is inadequate for ferrying the pensioners, so Katy hot-wires a traditional red London double-decker bus.

Arriving at the care home, they manage to break the zombie siege and rescue Ray and the other surviving residents. They all escape aboard the bus, but it breaks down before it can reach safety and the group are forced to abandon it. Realising that they are close to the river, they head off to find a boat. Making their way to a mooring they find a boat, and Peggy finds the keys, but they realise as they try to pull away that it is still chained up. Ray decides to sacrifice himself to save the others, but he still manages to survive and joins the rest on the boat as they make their final escape. On the river, the group wonder what will happen next; Ray tells them they can take East London back for themselves.

== Cast ==
- Rasmus Hardiker as Terry
- Harry Treadaway as Andy
- Michelle Ryan as Katy
- Alan Ford as Ray
- Georgia King as Emma
- Jack Doolan as Davey Tuppence
- Ashley Thomas as Mental Mickey
- Tony Gardner as Clive
- Tony Selby as Daryl
- Georgina Hale as Doreen
- Dudley Sutton as Eric
- Richard Briers as Hamish
- Honor Blackman as Peggy
- Elizabeth Webster as Natasha

== Production and release ==
Director, Matthias Hoene and writer James Moran originally approached Alan Ford to play the character of Ray because "whoever this person is, he needed to symbolise what a cockney is -- he needed to be as cockney as you can be." After reading the script, Ford had joked that he felt like the script had been written for him and accepted the role because "It's an exciting action hero role. He's got a big, heroic arc in this film."

The film premiered at the 2012 London FrightFest Film Festival. It was released on Blu-ray and DVD on 3 September 2013 by Shout Factory! as part of their Scream Factory line up. It has a 20-minute behind-the-scenes featurette, a video to teach the extras how to act like a zombie, and the trailer.

Cockneys vs Zombies was Richard Briers' final acting credit as he died the following year. The film was also the final movie appearance of Honor Blackman, who died on 5 April 2020.

== Reception ==
The film was received mostly positively by critics. It holds a Rotten Tomatoes rating of 77%, based on 48 reviews. The website's consensus reads, "If you're interested in watching a battle between cockneys and zombies, this is the movie for you."
