= Clifford Samuel =

British actor

Clifford Samuel is a British actor.

Clifford Samuel began acting at the Anna Scher Theatre. He is from North London and born of Nigerian heritage. Clifford trained at the Guildhall School of Music & Drama, and graduated early to make his debut at the Royal Shakespeare Company, in Julius Caesar and The Two Gentlemen of Verona, in Stratford-upon-Avon and also toured in the United States.

Clifford played Octavius Caesar at the Lyric Theatre, Hammersmith, in London in 2005. He then went on to work for the Cheek by Jowl theatre company, in the classical play, The Changeling at the Barbican theatre in London. Clifford toured with The Changeling on an extensive European tour in 2006, where it was awarded Best Foreign Play 2006 in Spain. From that period onwards, he worked periodically with the English theatre and film director and innovator, Peter Brook. Clifford portrayed Tony Anderson, opposite actor Jack Shepherd, in the play Chasing the Moment at the Arcola Theatre.

He later appeared as the co-lead in the much anticipated two-part special of The Bill, which went on to win the Best Diversity in Drama Production at the Screen Nation Awards 2007, best continuing drama at the Royal Television Society Awards and nominated for Best Continuing Drama at the 2008 BAFTA TV Awards.

Clifford recently finished performing at the National Theatre as the co-lead in a new play by the actor/playwright Kwame Kwei-Armah called Statement of Regret.

Clifford was also in the recently released feature film Shoot on Sight, directed by Jag Mundhra.

He can be seen playing Charly Charles the 1970s drummer in the film biopic, Sex and Drugs and Rock and Roll about rock star Ian Dury and the Blockheads which is being shown in cinemas across the UK. He has recently finished playing 'Eilif' in Mother Courage and Her Children at the National Theatre opposite Fiona Shaw directed by Deborah Warner. Currently at the Finborough Theatre in the American play, In the Blood by Pulitzer prize-winning playwright Suzan-Lori Parks. This show has been nominated for three Offies. On 13 April 2023, it was announced Clifford would be joining the cast of 2:22 A Ghost Story from 14 May at the Apollo Theatre.

== Credits ==
2014, The Events, Actors Touring Company, as The Boy

2010, Sex & Drugs & Rock & Roll, (Upcoming Film)

2008, Statement of Regret, National Theatre as Adrian Mackenzie

2007, Shoot on Sight, as Elijah, Film

2007, The Bill, as Tyrone Brooks, TV Drama

2007, Roman’s Empire, as Frobisher, BBC TV series

Chasing the Moment, 2007, Arcola theatre as Tony Anderson, Best Play Timeout Critics Choice Award

The Changeling, 2006, Cheek by Jowl stage play, Barbican/European Tour as Tomazo, Best International play El Mundo & El Pais Awards Spain

Julius Caesar, 2005, Royal Shakespeare Company, as Octavius Caesar
