= Sam Morelos =

American actor

- Born: July 7, 2005 (age 21); Los Angeles, California
- Occupation: Actor
- Years active: 2016–present

Sam Morelos (born July 7, 2005) is an American actor. They (Note: Morelos is non-binary and uses they/them pronouns.) are best known for playing Nikki in the Netflix teen sitcom That '90s Show and Abby in the comedy film Summer of 69.

== Early life ==
Morelos was born in Los Angeles, California and was named after the fictional character Samantha "Sam" Baker from the John Hughes movie Sixteen Candles. They took up acting at a young age, attending California School of the Arts - San Gabriel Valley, in the acting conservatory. They are a first-generation Filipino-American.

== Career ==
Their breakout role came playing Nikki in the teen sitcom That '90s Show. Their biggest movie role so far has been playing Abby in the comedy film Summer of 69. They played Meadow in Descendants: The Rise of Red. They will appear in the upcoming film Laura Dean Keeps Breaking Up with Me based on the novel of the same name.

== Personal life ==
Morelos is non-binary and uses they/them pronouns, but often feels comfortable playing female roles.

== Filmography ==
=== Film ===
Year	Title	Role	Notes
2016	Extraordinary Night	Daughter	Short film
2022	Forgetting Nobody	Nobody	Short film
2023	Swallowing Shadows	Maddie Mendoza	Short film
2024	Descendants: The Rise of Red	Meadow	
2025	Summer of 69	Abby	
2025	Regretting You	Lexie	
TBA	Laura Dean Keeps Breaking Up With Me †	Freddie Riley	
TBA	This Land is Cursed †	Devin	Short film

=== Television ===
Year	Title	Role	Notes
2023	Table Read Podcast	Judy	Episode: "PV & Franny"
2023–2024	That '90s Show	Nikki Velasco	Main role
