= Joely Richardson =

British actress (born 1965)

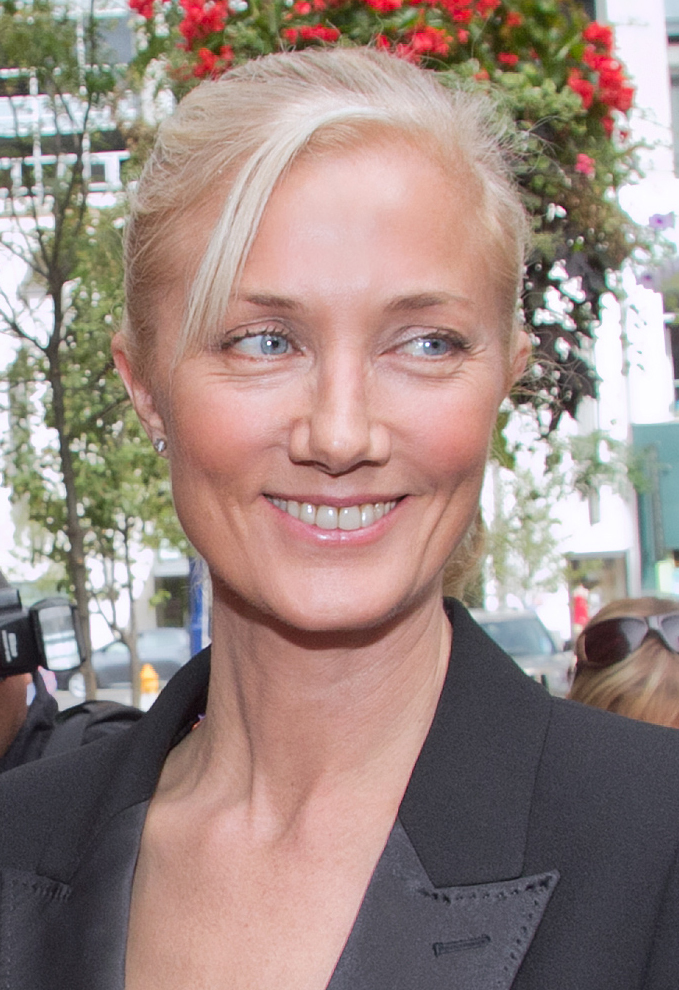
- Richardson at Toronto Film Festival 2011
- Born: Joely Kim Richardson; 9 January 1965 (age 61); Marylebone, London, England
- Education: Royal Academy of Dramatic Art
- Occupation: Actress
- Years active: 1968; 1985–present
- Spouse: Tim Bevan (m. 1992; div. 2001)
- Children: Daisy Bevan
- Parents: Tony Richardson; Vanessa Redgrave
- Relatives: Micheál Richardson (nephew); Natasha Richardson (sister); Carlo Gabriel Nero (half-brother); Lynn Redgrave (aunt); Jemma Redgrave (cousin)
- Family: Redgrave
- Richardson's voice recorded 2012, as part of an audio description of the Albert Memorial for VocalEyes

Joely Kim Richardson (born 9 January 1965) is a British actress. She is notable for her roles as Julia McNamara in the FX drama series Nip/Tuck (2003–2010), Katherine Parr in the Showtime series The Tudors (2010), and Ethel Cripps in the Netflix series The Sandman (2022). Her film credits include Drowning by Numbers (1988), King Ralph (1991), 101 Dalmatians (1996), Event Horizon (1997), The Patriot (2000), Anonymous (2011), the Hollywood film adaptation of The Girl with the Dragon Tattoo (2011), Endless Love (2014), Red Sparrow (2018), The Turning (2020), and Little Bone Lodge (2023).

== Early life ==
Joely Kim Richardson was born in Marylebone, London, to the theatrical Redgrave family, the daughter of actress Vanessa Redgrave and director Tony Richardson (1928–1991), and the granddaughter of actors Sir Michael Redgrave (1908–1985) and Rachel Kempson, Lady Redgrave (1910–2003). (Note: In his autobiography, Tony Richardson notes that Kim was the original chosen name in honour of the actress Kim Stanley (1922–2002), but at the last minute they copied Natasha's swimming teacher who named her daughter Joely. It was actually a misspelling of the French jolie.) Actress Natasha Richardson (1963–2009) was her sister and actor Liam Neeson is her brother-in-law. She is the aunt of Micheál Richardson and Daniel Neeson, the niece of Lynn Redgrave (1943–2010) and Corin Redgrave (1939–2010), and cousin of Jemma Redgrave, who is five days younger than Richardson.

Joely appeared as an extra at the age of three in the 1968 version of The Charge of the Light Brigade, directed by her father. Richardson and her sister Natasha's early education began at the independent St Paul's Girls' School in Hammersmith. At age 14, Richardson moved to boarding school at the independent Harry Hopman Tennis School in Tampa, Florida. In 1983, she graduated from the Thacher School in Ojai, California, then returned to London to study at the Royal Academy of Dramatic Art and graduated in 1985.

== Career ==
Possessing an early ambition to become a professional tennis player, she spent two years at a tennis academy in Florida. Richardson then turned to acting. In 1985, she portrayed, by flashbacks, the younger version of the leading character played by her mother in the film Wetherby. After a leading role in Peter Greenaway's cult success Drowning by Numbers (1988), her first major role in front of a mass audience was as Joanna Farley in a 1989 television episode of Poirot, based on Agatha Christie's detective series. In a 1989 episode of Jim Henson's The Storyteller, she was cast as a princess. She portrayed a teacher on the verge of a nervous breakdown in the 1989 Channel 4 serial Behaving Badly and fictional Finnish Princess Anna (with "a voice like a tuba") in the 1991 screen comedy King Ralph.

A year later she appeared in Shining Through alongside her future brother-in-law, Liam Neeson, with both actors playing Nazis.

In 1993, Richardson appeared in the BBC's Lady Chatterley opposite Sean Bean. In 1996, she appeared with Ted Danson in the film Loch Ness and also played fashion designer Anita Campbell-Green in the Disney live-action remake of the animated 101 Dalmatians opposite Glenn Close as Cruella de Vil. In 1998, in the television drama The Echo, she played Amanda Powell. The next year, she played in the science fiction horror film Event Horizon as Lieutenant Starck, executive officer of the research and rescue ship Lewis and Clark, sent to rescue crew of the long-lost experimental ship Event Horizon.

One year later, Richardson appeared opposite Mel Gibson in the film The Patriot, an American film set in the American Revolution. Also in 2000, she appeared opposite Hugh Laurie in Maybe Baby, Ben Elton's film adaptation of his book Inconceivable. She was cast in the 2001 film The Affair of the Necklace after director Charles Shyer noticed her resemblance to doomed 18th century French Queen Marie Antoinette.

In 2003, Richardson took on the role of Julia McNamara in the television drama Nip/Tuck, based on the complicated lives of two plastic surgeons filled with romance in Miami. Her mother, Vanessa Redgrave, appeared in several episodes, playing her character's mother.

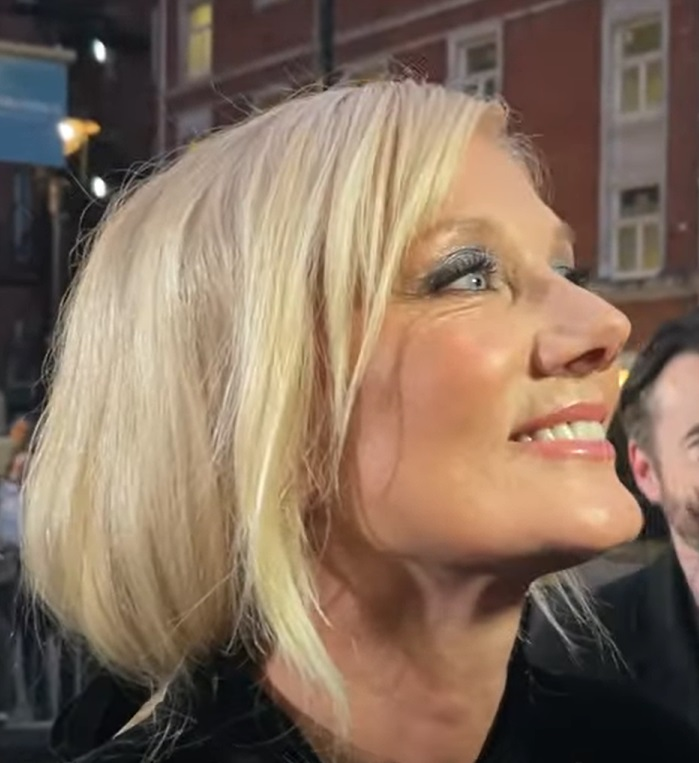
Richardson in 2024

In 2005, Richardson starred in Lies My Mother Told Me, based on a true story about a murderous con artist. In 2007, she played the mother in The Last Mimzy with Timothy Hutton and Chris O'Neil. She also starred in the television drama Wallis & Edward, playing the lead role of Wallis Simpson, lover of Edward, Prince of Wales.

In 2009–10, Richardson appeared as Katherine Parr, sixth wife of Henry VIII, in the fourth (and final) season of Showtime's hit period drama The Tudors. The role reunited her with her former husband Tim Bevan, who was part of the show's production team.

Richardson joined the cast of TV series Titanic: Blood and Steel in which she played the role of Countess Markievicz. In 2015, she co-starred alongside Arnold Schwarzenegger in the zombie thriller film Maggie.

== Personal life ==
Richardson had an affair with Archie Stirling, which broke up Stirling's marriage to actress Diana Rigg in 1990. Richardson married film producer Tim Bevan in 1992; they divorced in 2001. The couple had a daughter, actress Daisy Bevan, born in 1992. She was also one of several women romantically linked to Jamie Theakston before Theakston's marriage in 2007.

Richardson is an ambassador for The Children's Trust, the UK's leading charity for children with brain injury and neurodisability, as well as Save the Children.

== Filmography ==
Key
†	Denotes films that have not yet been released

=== Film ===
Year	Title	Role	Notes
1968	The Charge of the Light Brigade	Extra	Uncredited
1985	Wetherby	Young Jean Travers	
1987	Body Contact	Dominique	
1988	Drowning by Numbers	Cissie Colpitts 3	
1989	A proposito di quella strana ragazza	Giovanna Serafin (Maria)	aka About That Foreign Girl in English
1991	King Ralph	Princess Anna	
1992	Rebecca's Daughters	Rhiannon	
1992	Shining Through	Margrete Von Eberstein	
1994	Sister My Sister	Christine Papin	
1994	I'll Do Anything	Cathy Breslow	
1996	Loch Ness	Laura McFetridge	
1996	101 Dalmatians	Anita Campbell-Green-Dearly	
1996	Hollow Reed	Hannah	
1997	Event Horizon	Lt. Starck	
1998	Under Heaven	Eleanor Dunston	
1998	Wrestling with Alligators	Claire	
1998	The Tribe	Emily	
2000	Maybe Baby	Lucy Bell	
2000	Return to Me	Elizabeth Rueland	
2000	The Patriot	Charlotte Selton	
2001	The Affair of the Necklace	Marie-Antoinette	
2004	Fallen Angel	Katherine Wentworth	
2004	The Fever	Woman at 30	
2007	The Last Mimzy	Jo Wilder	
2007	The Christmas Miracle of Jonathan Toomey	Susan McDowel	
2011	Anonymous	Young Queen Elizabeth I	
2011	The Girl with the Dragon Tattoo	Anita Vanger/Harriet Vanger	
2012	Red Lights	Monica Handsen	
2012	Thanks for Sharing	Katie	
2013	The Devil's Violinist	Ethel Langham	
2014	Vampire Academy	Queen Tatiana Ivashkov	
2014	Endless Love	Ann Butterfield	
2014	Maggie	Caroline Vogel	
2015	Papa: Hemingway in Cuba	Mary Hemingway	
2016	Snowden	Janine Gibson	
2016	Fallen	Sophia Bliss	
2017	The Hatton Garden Job	Erzebet Zslondos	
2017	The Time of Their Lives	Lucy	
2018	Red Sparrow	Nina	
2018	In Darkness	Alix	
2018	The Aspern Papers	Miss Tina	
2018	Surviving Christmas with the Relatives	Lyla	
2019	Color Out of Space	Theresa Gardner	
2020	The Turning	Darla	
2022	The Lost Girls	Jane	
2022	Lady Chatterley's Lover	Mrs. Bolton	
2023	Little Bone Lodge	Mama	
2025	Downton Abbey: The Grand Finale	Sarah, Lady Petersfield	

=== Television ===
Year	Title	Role	Notes
1988	The StoryTeller	Princess	Episode: "The Three Ravens"
1989	Behaving Badly	Serafina	4 episodes
1989	Agatha Christie's Poirot	Joanna Farley	Episode: "The Dream"
1991	Heading Home	Janetta Wheatland	Television film
1993	Lady Chatterley	Lady Chatterley	4 episodes
2003–2010	Nip/Tuck	Julia McNamara	Main role, 72 episodes
2003	Fallen Angel	Katherine Wentworth	Television movie
2005	Lies My Mother Told Me	Laren Sims	Television movie
2005	Wallis & Edward	Wallis, Duchess of Windsor	Television movie
2006	Fatal Contact: Bird Flu in America	Dr. Iris Varnack	Television movie
2007	Freezing	Rachel	Episode: "1.1"
2009	The Day of the Triffids	Jo Playton	2 episodes
2010	The Tudors	Katherine Parr	Main role (season 4), 5 episodes
2012	Titanic: Blood and Steel	Countess Markievicz	Episode: "Stained Steel"
2012	BBC Shakespeare Uncovered	Host	Episode: "The Comedies" ("Twelfth Night", "As You Like It")
2017	Emerald City	Glinda	Main role
2019	The Rook	Lady Farrier/King	Main role; 8 episode miniseries
2020, 2022	The Blacklist	Cassandra Bianchi	Episodes: "Cornelius Ruck" and "Genuine Models, Inc."
2022	The Sandman	Ethel Cripps	11 episodes
2022	Suspect	Jackie Sowden	Main role
2024	Renegade Nell	Lady Moggerhanger	Main role
2024	One Day	Helen Cope	1 episode
2024–present	The Gentlemen	Lady Sabrina Halstead	Main role
2025	Bookish	Sandra Dare	Episodes: "Deadly Nitrate: Part 1" & "Deadly Nitrate: Part 2"

== Awards and nominations ==
Year	Association	Category	Nominated work	Result	Refs
1999	Independent Spirit Award	Best Supporting Female	Under Heaven	Nominated	
2004	Golden Globe Award	Best Actress in a Television Series – Drama	Nip/Tuck	Nominated	
2004	Satellite Award	Best Actress in a Television Series – Drama	Nip/Tuck	Nominated	
2005	Golden Globe Award	Best Actress in a Television Series – Drama	Nip/Tuck	Nominated	
2005	Satellite Award	Best Actress in a Television Series – Drama	Nip/Tuck	Nominated	
