= Neil Linpow =

English actor, writer and filmmaker

- Born: Bournemouth, England
- Occupation: Actor
- Years active: 2011–present

Neil Linpow is an actor, writer and filmmaker of Irish and Chinese heritage.

== Biography ==
=== Early life and career ===
Neil grew up between Bournemouth and Clonmel. He has written for directors including Michel Gondry, Tom Hooper, Michael Gracey, Colm McCarthy, Sam Miller and Bobby Farrelly.

=== Screen work ===
In 2019 Linpow wrote, directed, produced and starred in the short film Time. It was an Official Selection at the BAFTA qualifying 39th Cambridge Film Festival and nominated for Best Film and Best Performance awards at the Kinsale Sharks Awards.

His follow-up short, Lesson 7, starring Michelle Fairley, was released in 2020, winning awards across multiple festivals. It was an Official Selection at the BAFTA qualifying 11th Aesthetica Short Film Festival and at the Oscar and BAFTA qualifying Rhode Island International Film Festival in 2021.

In 2023, Linpow wrote and starred in the psychological thriller, Little Bone Lodge, directed by Matthias Hoene. Total Film said 'Linpow's desperate performance brings to mind a young Paddy Considine or Johnny Harris.

In 2026 he played Robby in the acclaimed, BIFA winning and BAFTA nominated Wasteman directed by Cal McMau and starring alongside David Jonsson, Tom Blythe, Alex Hassell and Corin Silva.
