= Carley Fortune =

Canadian writer

- Born: February 7, 1984 (age 42); Toronto, Ontario, Canada
- Education: Toronto Metropolitan University
- Occupation: Author
- Writing career
- Language: English
- Years active: 2022–present
- Website: carleyfortune.com

Carley Fortune (born February 7, 1984) is a Canadian best-selling author, living in Toronto, Ontario. Fortune's five novels—Every Summer After, Meet Me At The Lake, This Summer Will Be Different, One Golden Summer, and Our Perfect Storm—all have been New York Times Bestsellers.

== Career ==
Before becoming a novelist, Fortune was an award-winning journalist. She has been a contributor and editor for Refinery29, The Globe and Mail, Chatelaine, and Toronto Life.

Fortune published her debut novel Every Summer After in 2022. The novel was set in her hometown, Barry's Bay, Ontario. In 2024, Amazon Prime Video announced it would be releasing an adaptation of Every Summer After. The series, Every Year After, premiered on June 10, 2026.

Meet Me at the Lake, set in Muskoka, followed in 2023; the book made the bestseller lists in both Canada and the United States, and it attracted widespread press when it was optioned by Prince Harry and Meghan Markle's production company, Archewell, for development as a film. Meet Me at the Lake was selected for the 2024 edition of Canada Reads, where it was defended by Mirian Njoh.

In August 2024, her follow-up novel This Summer Will Be Different, a romance set on Prince Edward Island, topped the Canadian fiction bestseller list. In March 2026, Netflix Canada announced a 10-episode adaptation of This Summer Will Be Different, to be filmed on location on PEI and Toronto. The series will star Canadian actress Sophie Nélisse as Lucy Ashby, Francesca Reale as her best friend Bridget, and Roby Attal as Felix, Bridget's brother and Lucy's forbidden love interest. Canadians Malin Akerman and Megan Follows will also star as Aunt Stacy and Cheryl respectively.

In 2025, she published One Golden Summer. The story follows Charlie Florek, the brother of Fortune's male protagonist from her debut novel, Every Summer After. Both stories are set in Fortune's hometown of Barry's Bay, Ontario. In July 2026, Prime Video announced its series, Every Year After, would return for a second season, focusing on Fortune's second Barry's Bay novel, One Golden Summer.

In 2026, Fortune published Our Perfect Storm. The novel is set on Vancouver Island's idyllic beach town, Tofino. The novel debuted at number one on the New York Times Bestseller List and topped bestseller lists in Canada.

Fortune's sixth book, Only in Summer, will be released on May 18, 2027 and will be set in Barry's Bay, where Every Summer After and One Golden Summer were also set.

== Bibliography ==
=== Every Summer After series ===
- Every Summer After (2022)
- One Golden Summer (2025)
- Only in Summer (2027)

=== Other novels ===
- Meet Me at the Lake (2023)
- This Summer Will Be Different (2024)
- Our Perfect Storm (2026)

== Awards and recognition ==
- New York Public Library Best Books for Adults 2022 – Every Summer After
- #14 on Toronto Life's 50 Most Influential in 2025
