= List of Prison Break characters =

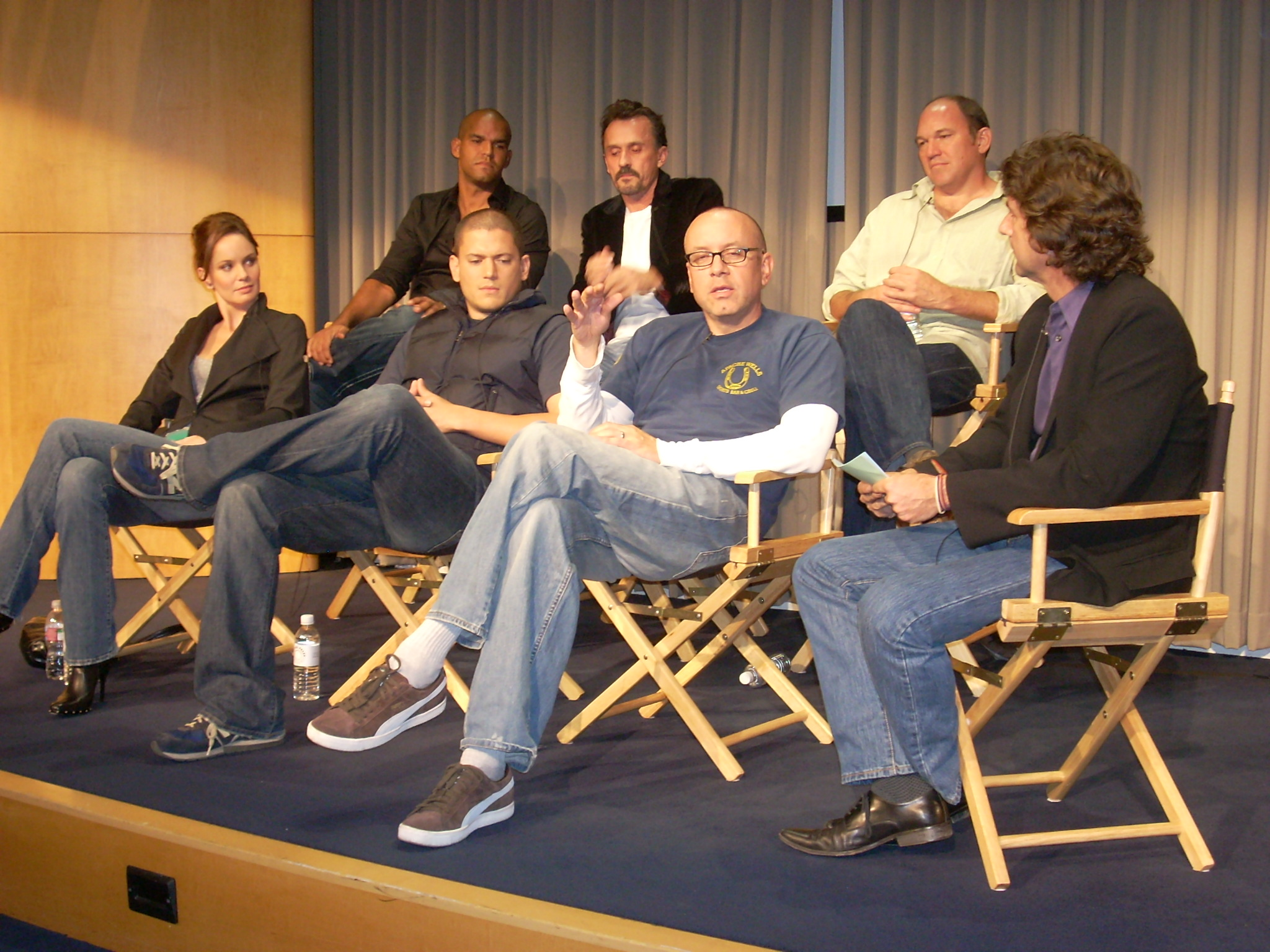
Cast members of Prison Break: Amaury Nolasco, Robert Knepper, Wade Williams, Sarah Wayne Callies, Wentworth Miller with executive producer Matt Olmstead

This is a list of characters in the American television series Prison Break. The characters are listed alphabetically by their last name or by the name which appears in the episode credits.

== Overview ==
Main cast (credited)
Recurring cast (3+)
Guest cast (1–2)

=== Main cast ===
Actor	Character	Seasons					
Actor	Character	1	2	3	4	The Final Break	5
Dominic Purcell	Lincoln Burrows	Main	Main	Main	Main	Main	Main
Wentworth Miller	Michael J. Scofield	Main	Main	Main	Main	Main	Main
Robin Tunney	Veronica Donovan	Main	Main				
Amaury Nolasco	Fernando Sucre	Main	Main	Main	Main	Main	Main
Marshall Allman	Lincoln "L. J." Burrows Jr.	Main	Main	Recurring	Guest		
Peter Stormare	John Abruzzi	Main	Recurring				
Wade Williams	Bradley "Brad" Bellick	Main	Main	Main	Main		
Sarah Wayne Callies	Sara Scofield (née Tancredi)	Main	Main	Stand-in	Main	Main	Main
Paul Adelstein	Paul Kellerman	Main	Main		Special Guest		Main
Robert Knepper	Theodore "T-Bag" Bagwell	Main	Main	Main	Main	Main	Main
Rockmond Dunbar	Benjamin Miles "C-Note" Franklin	Main	Main		Special Guest		Main
William Fichtner	Alexander "Alex" Mahone		Main	Main	Main	Main	
Chris Vance	James Whistler			Main	Main		
Robert Wisdom	Norman "Lechero" St. John			Main			
Danay Garcia	Sofía Lugo			Main (Note: Garcia only appears in two episodes of season four, although credited as a main cast member in only one episode and a guest star in the other.)	Main		
Jodi Lyn O'Keefe	Gretchen Morgan			Main	Main	Main	
Michael Rapaport	Donald "Don" Self				Main		
Mark Feuerstein	Jacob Anton Ness / Poseidon						Main
Inbar Lavi	Sheba						Main
Augustus Prew	David "Whip" Martin						Main

=== Recurring cast ===
Actor	Character	Seasons					
Actor	Character	1	2	3	4	The Final Break	5
Silas Weir Mitchell	Charles "Haywire" Patoshik	Recurring	Recurring	Guest			
Camille Guaty	Maricruz Delgado	Recurring	Recurring	Guest			
Stacy Keach	Warden Henry Pope	Recurring	Recurring				
Patricia Wettig	Caroline Reynolds	Recurring	Recurring				
Lane Garrison	David "Tweener" Apolskis	Recurring	Recurring				
Matt DeCaro	Roy Geary	Recurring	Recurring				
John Heard	Governor Frank Tancredi	Recurring	Recurring				
Cynthia Kaye McWilliams	Kacee Franklin	Recurring	Recurring				
John Billingsley	Terrence Steadman	Recurring					
Jeff Perry	Terrence Steadman		Recurring				
Phillip Edward Van Lear	Louis Patterson	Recurring	Guest				
Christian Stolte	Keith Stolte	Recurring	Guest				
DuShon Monique Brown	Katie Welch	Recurring	Guest				
Joe Nunez	Manche Sanchez	Recurring	Guest				
Anthony Fleming	Trumpets	Recurring	Guest				
Holly Valance	Nika Volek	Recurring	Guest				
Kurt Caceres	Hector Avila	Recurring	Guest				
Muse Watson	Charles Westmoreland	Recurring			Guest		
Jennifer Kern	Allison Hale	Recurring			Guest		
Frank Grillo	Nick Savrinn	Recurring					
Mac Brandt	Mick Andrews	Recurring					
Danny McCarthy	Daniel Hale	Recurring					
Mark Morettini	Rizzo Green	Recurring					
Michelle Forbes	Samantha Brinker	Recurring					
Jennifer Joan Taylor	Becky Gerber	Recurring					
Javon Johnson	JJ	Recurring					
Peter Reineman	Gus Fiorello	Recurring					
Rich Komenich	Maggio	Recurring					
Jessalyn Gilsig	Lisa Rix	Recurring					
Al Sapienza	Philly Falzone	Recurring					
Anthony Starke	Sebastian Balfour	Recurring					
Tom McElroy	Reverend Mailor	Recurring					
Antoine McKay	Roy Weston	Recurring					
Blaine Hogan	Seth "Cherry" Hoffner	Recurring					
Robert Michael Vieau	Christopher Trokey	Recurring					
Gianni Russo	Gavin Smallhouse	Recurring					
Philip Rayburn Smith	Adrian Rix	Recurring					
Helena Klevorn	Dede Franklin	Guest	Recurring				
K.K. Dodds	Susan Hollander	Guest	Recurring				
Anthony Denison	Aldo Burrows	Guest	Recurring				
Danielle Campbell	Gracey Hollander	Guest	Recurring				
Quinn Wermeling	Zack Hollander	Guest	Recurring				
Barbara Eve Harris	Agent Felicia Lang		Recurring	Recurring	Recurring	Supporting	
Leon Russom	Jonathan Krantz		Recurring	Guest	Recurring	Supporting	
Wilbur Fitzgerald	Bruce Bennett		Recurring		Recurring		
Callie Thorne	Pamela "Pam" Mahone (née Larson)		Recurring		Recurring		
Jason Davis	Agent Mark Wheeler		Recurring		Guest		
Rachel Loera	Theresa Delgado		Recurring		Guest		
Reggie Lee	Agent William "Bill" Kim		Recurring				
Kristin Malko	Debra Jean Belle		Recurring				
Steven Chester Prince	Agent Blondie		Recurring				
Diana Scarwid	Jeanette Owens		Recurring				
Alexandra Lydon	Ann Owens		Recurring				
Kim Coates	Agent Richard Sullins		Guest	Recurring	Guest	Supporting	
John S. Davies	Elliott Pike		Guest	Recurring			
Crystal Mantecón	Carmelita / Sister Mary Francis			Recurring	Guest		
Carlo Alban	Luis "McGrady" Gallego			Recurring			
Laurence Mason	Sammy Norino			Recurring			
Davi Jay	Papo			Recurring			
Joseph Melendez	Rafael			Recurring			
Curtis Wayne	Cheo			Recurring			
Christian Bowman	Agent King			Recurring			
Manny Rubio	Juan Nieves			Recurring			
Carlos Compean	Colonel Escamilla			Recurring			
Julio Cedillo	General Mestas			Recurring			
Reynaldo Gallegos	Cristobal			Recurring			
F.J. Rio	Augusto			Recurring			
Alex Fernandez	Captain Hurtado			Recurring			
Alec Rayme	Cyrus			Recurring			
Gustavo Mellado	Alphonso Gallego			Recurring			
Anthony Escobar	Gravedigger			Recurring			
Mike Seal	Octavio			Recurring			
Shannon Lucio	Miriam Holtz / Trishanne Smith				Recurring		
Cress Williams	Wyatt Mathewson				Recurring		
Stacy Haiduk	Lisa Tabak				Recurring		
James Hiroyuki Liao	Roland Glenn				Recurring		
Dan Sachoff	Krantz's Aide				Recurring		
Kathleen Quinlan	Christina Rose Scofield				Recurring		
Ted King	Downey				Recurring		
Raphael Sbarge	Ralph Becker				Recurring		
Michael Bryan French	Gregory White				Recurring		
Ron Yuan	Feng Huan				Recurring		
Steve Tom	Stuart Tuxhorn				Recurring		
Graham McTavish	Ferguson				Recurring		
Heather McComb	Rita Morgan				Recurring		
Dameon Clarke	Andrew Blauner				Recurring		
Regan Licciardello	Emily Morgan				Recurring		
Michael O'Neill	Herb Stanton				Recurring		
Jude Ciccolella	Howard Scuderi				Recurring		
Troy Ruptash	Jasper Potts				Recurring		
Shaun Duke	Griffin Oren				Recurring		
Chris Bruno	Agent Todd Wheatley					Supporting	
Aisha Hinds	Bo Cowler					Supporting	
Lori Petty	Daddy					Supporting	
Amy Aquino	Warden Alice Simms					Supporting	
Richmond Arquette	Joe Daniels					Supporting	
Alicia Lagano	Agatha Warrem					Supporting	
Dot-Marie Jones	Skittlez					Supporting	
Rainbow Borden	Snags					Supporting	
Marina Benedict	Emily "A&W" Blake						Recurring
Steve Mouzakis	Van Gogh						Recurring
Christian Michael Cooper	Mike Scofield						Recurring
Rick Yune	Ja						Recurring
Kunal Sharma	Sid al-Tunis						Recurring
Amin El Gamal	Cyclops						Recurring
Bobby Naderi	Mustapha						Recurring
Curtis Lum	Agent Henry Kawakami-Kishida						Recurring
Numan Acar	Abu Ramal						Recurring
Crystal Balint	Heather						Recurring
Akin Gazi	Omar						Recurring
Michael Benyaer	Zakat						Recurring
Leo Rano	Luca Abruzzi						Recurring
Faran Tahir	Jamil						Recurring
Devin Mackenzie	Andrew Nelson						Recurring

== Main characters ==
=== Lincoln Burrows ===
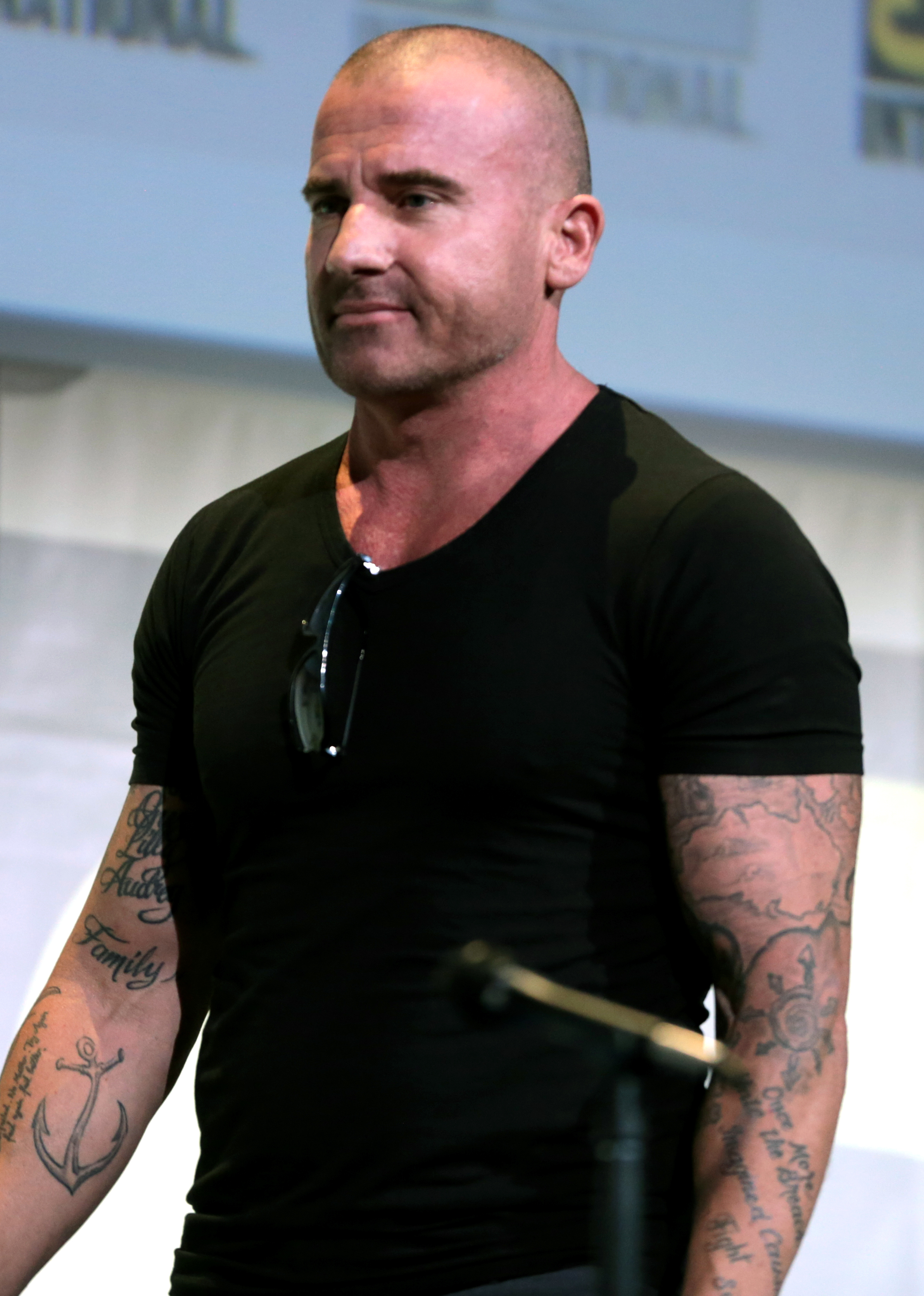
Dominic Purcell

Lincoln Burrows
- Prison Break character
- First appearance: "Pilot" (2005)
- Last appearance: "Behind The Eyes" (2017)
- Created by: Paul Scheuring
- Portrayed by: Dominic Purcell; Max Kirsch (young); Hunter Jablonski (young)
- Voiced by: Dominic Purcell (video game)

In-universe information
- Aliases: Linc the Sink; Linc; Archie Ryan; Sergio
- Family: Aldo Burrows (father); Christina Rose Scofield (mother); Michael Scofield (brother); Sara Tancredi (sister-in-law); Lincoln "L. J." Burrows Jr. (son via Lisa); Michael Scofield Jr. (nephew, adoptive son)
- Spouse: Lisa Rix
- Significant others: Veronica Donovan; Sofía Lugo; Sheba

Lincoln Burrows (played by Dominic Purcell) is falsely convicted of the murder of Terrence Steadman and sentenced to death for the crime. He is surprised to see his younger brother Michael Scofield in the same prison and who is planning to break him out of prison before his execution. He evaded authorities after escaping from prison and has been exonerated of all charges. In the second season of the series, the story continues to follow Lincoln, his brother and other escapees as they try to evade the authorities pursuing them. Away from the prison setting, Michael and Lincoln are frequently featured in scenes together in the first seven episodes. When they fail to retrieve L. J. Burrows before his trial, they decide to head to Utah to find Westmoreland's hidden money. In season 3 he is free and successfully assists Michael and James Whistler to break out of Sona. As of season 4, he is now part of Self's covert "A-Team" assembled to bring down The Company. He is also in the very last scene when he visits Michael Scofield's (his brother) grave, and he puts an origami crane on top of the grave so he can remember the time when he made them for him, so he would always know that his brother was caring for him. In season 5, he finds out Michael is still alive and incarcerated in Yemen, and leads an operation to save his brother.

Purcell was cast three days before the start of production and consequently, he was the last actor to join the original cast. He auditioned for the role while he had a recurring role as Tommy Ravetto on North Shore.

=== Michael Scofield ===
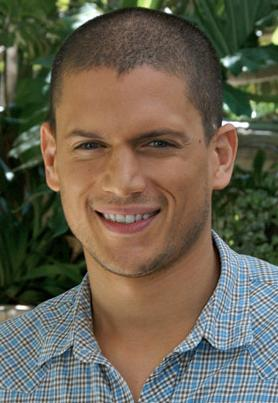
Wentworth Miller

Michael J. Scofield (played by Wentworth Miller) is the protagonist of the series and younger brother of Lincoln Burrows. He designs an elaborate escape plan and tattoos it to his body to free his older brother who has been framed for murder and sentenced to death via the electric chair. He successfully executes this plan, freeing himself, Lincoln and 6 other convicts, but ultimately fails to evade the police in Panama. In the second season of the series, the story continues to follow Michael, his brother and other escapees as they try to evade the authorities pursuing them. Away from the prison setting, Michael and Lincoln are frequently featured in scenes together in the first seven episodes. When they fail to retrieve L. J. Burrows before his trial, they decide to head to Utah to find Westmoreland's hidden money. Michael and Lincoln travel together, after the fugitives separate to accomplish each of their individual goals. Season 3 is centered around Michael breaking out of prison again, however, this time from the self-governed prison of Sona, situated in Panama. In season 4, he reunites with Sara after discovering her death in season 3 was faked, and she is part of Agent Donald Self's covert "A-Team", which is assembled to bring down The Company. Michael has low latent inhibition, a personality trait which allows him to notice things that others would not. This, along with his genius-level intellect, is what enabled him to break out of both prisons. He also suffers from a tumor of the hypothalamus, which causes nosebleeds, disorientation, and extreme pain. In season 5, he is revealed to be incarcerated in Yemen under a different name; Kaniel Outis. It is gradually revealed that Michael, along with a fellow prisoner named Whip, are undercover CIA operatives, but were betrayed by a mastermind agent known as Poseidon.

=== Veronica Donovan ===
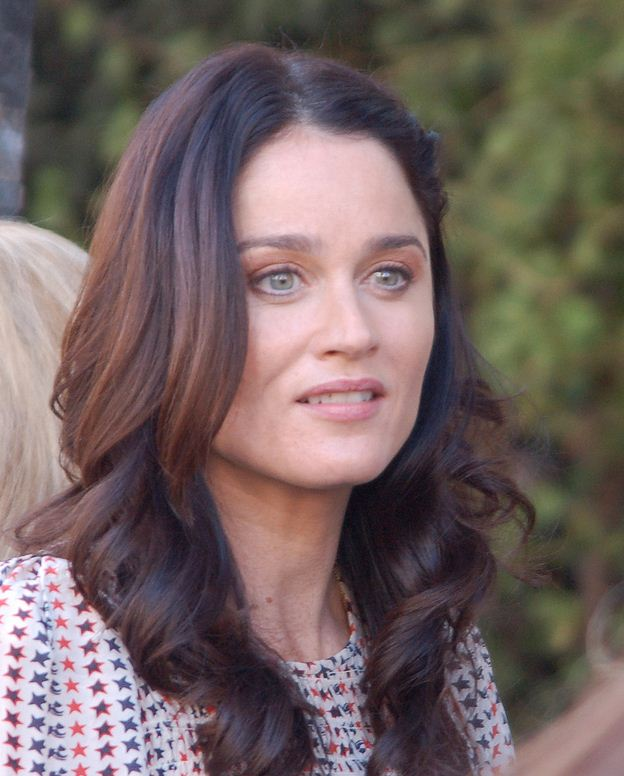
Robin Tunney

Veronica Donovan
- Prison Break character
- First appearance: "Pilot" (2005)
- Last appearance: "Manhunt" (2006)
- Created by: Paul Scheuring
- Portrayed by: Robin Tunney; Annie Yokom (young)

In-universe information
- Occupation: Lawyer
- Significant others: Sebastian Balfour; Lincoln Burrows

Veronica Donovan (played by Robin Tunney; seasons 1–2) is a real-estate lawyer and a longtime friend of the protagonists of the series, who unsuccessfully tries to find evidence to exonerate Lincoln Burrows. She serves as the primary ally of the brothers in the show's first season. Veronica had a relationship with Lincoln in High School and the two also dated each other after she graduated from Baylor law school. However, at the start of the show they have broken up since several years. When Lincoln is first framed for the murder of Terrence Steadman, Veronica assumes that he is guilty and moves on with her life. Sometime between the episode "Brother's Keeper", and the pilot, she gets engaged to Sebastian Balfour. Although she is a real estate lawyer and not a criminal lawyer, Veronica defends her childhood friend, Michael Scofield at his trial. Initially, she doesn't believe Lincoln's innocence and is convinced by the security tape footage. However, after the disappearance of Leticia Barris, a witness who could prove Lincoln's innocence and the death of a bishop who opposed Lincoln's death penalty, Veronica is led to believe that Lincoln might have been set up. Thus, Michael's arrest causes her to grow more involved with Lincoln's case, straining her relationship with Sebastian. Following the disappearance of Leticia in the episode "Cell Test", Veronica decides to postpone the wedding as she claims that she cannot focus on it at the time. Sebastian is hurt by this and breaks off the engagement.

She approaches Project Justice for help with Lincoln's case, knowing that she herself doesn't have any experience in death penalty cases. However, they refuse to partake in her case. Nick Savrinn later offers his help after telling her that his father was similarly accused of a crime he did not commit. Together, they work tirelessly, trying to uncover the truth behind Terrence Steadman's apparent murder. The original security tape which they were looking for is destroyed and in the subsequent episode, "Riots, Drills and the Devil Part 2", they are threatened via a public phone call in Washington, D.C. and are targeted by Paul Kellerman and Daniel Hale, who are members of the conspiracy. They were nearly killed by an explosion in Veronica's apartment and in the following episodes, LJ Burrows joins both of them after escaping from the agent's clutches. All three of them go into hiding. Their lives are once again in danger when an assassin called Agent Quinn manages to find out their secret location. Veronica eventually manages to knock him unconscious and escape with LJ and a wounded Nick. Veronica is then contacted by a secret informant, who claims to be willing to provide information. Knowing that hiding is not the answer, Veronica decides to go out into the open and reveal the conspiracy to the public. Veronica meets with the informant, agent Hale, the following night, where he reveals that Steadman is still alive. Hale is executed by Kellerman before he can provide proof, and Veronica barely has time to hide shortly before Kellerman arrives.

Now left more or less empty handed, Veronica and Nick nevertheless goes back to the court on Lincoln's execution day for one last time to appeal for Lincoln's case, but this ultimately fails as the judge rules against them. Fortunately, someone slips in evidence in the last minute which helps to stall Lincoln's execution. Veronica and Nick decide to send someone to do a test on Steadman's body, but the dental records matched Steadman's records. Following this, she decides to find out where the real Steadman is hiding. In "J-Cat", Nick, Veronica and L. J. return to New Glarus to visit the dead Quinn, where they obtain his cell phone. Eventually, they found out Terrence Steadman's hideout in Blackfoot, Montana. However, at the end of the episode "Tonight", Veronica is betrayed by Nick, who turned out to have made a deal with John Abruzzi to have her "ready and waiting" at the airport on the night of the escape in exchange for his father's freedom. Nick is conflicted, however, and ultimately lets her go to the airport as he doesn't want Veronica to be killed. Now alone, she travels to Blackfoot, Montana and manages to sneak into Steadman's house and confront him face to face.

In season 2, following her confrontation with Steadman (Jeff Perry), Veronica is executed in cold blood by secret service agents ordered to ensure that Terrence Steadman is kept hidden. Veronica is the first main character to be killed off in the series.

=== John Abruzzi ===
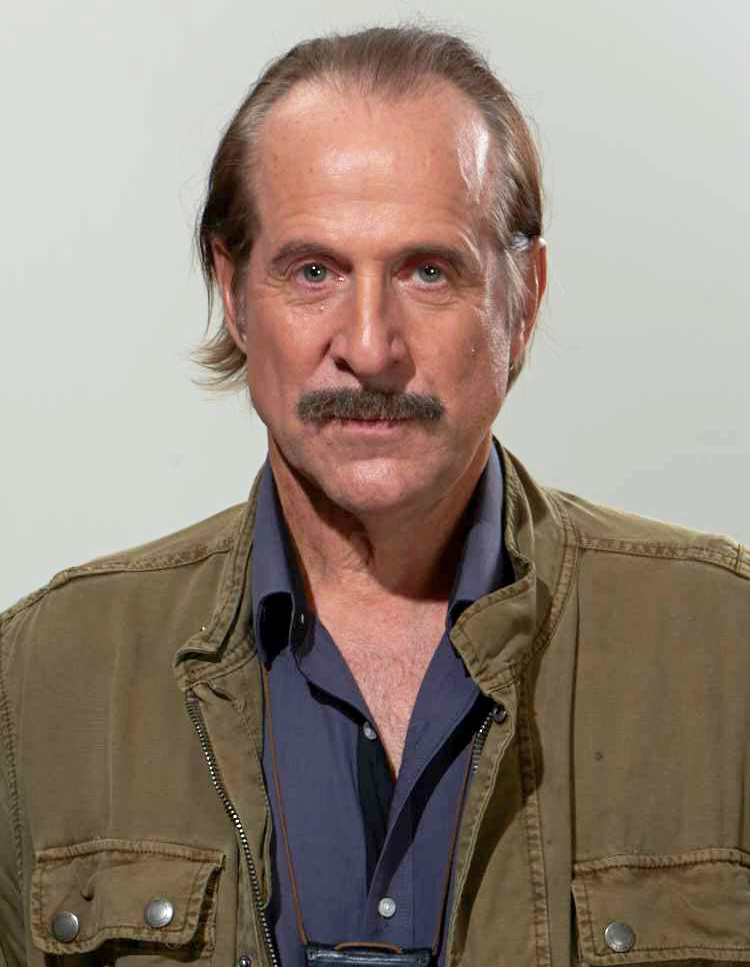
Peter Stormare

John Abruzzi
- Prison Break character
- First appearance: "Pilot" (2005)
- Last appearance: The Conspiracy (2010)
- Created by: Paul Scheuring
- Portrayed by: Peter Stormare
- Voiced by: Peter Stormare (video game)

In-universe information
- Occupation: Don of the Abruzzi Family of the Chicago Mafia
- Family: Nicole Abruzzi (daughter); John Abruzzi, Jr (son); Luca Abruzzi (son)
- Spouse: Sylvia Abruzzi

John Abruzzi (played by Peter Stormare; main: season 1; recurring: season 2) is an Italian-American mob boss and the Don of the Abruzzi crime family, who is imprisoned at Fox River with a life sentence. He controls Prison Industry, an internal work program for the convicts, thanks to his connections with Brad Bellick, who is on the payroll of Abruzzi's associates. He appears as an anti-hero where he is less of an antagonist than an unwanted ally to the protagonists. He is convicted based on the testimony of Otto Fibonacci, who saw him order the deaths of two men. Abruzzi plans to exact revenge on Fibonacci, who entered the witness protection program. In the pilot episode, he is approached by Michael Scofield with a PI membership request. Abruzzi at first dismisses the newcomer, but gives him his full attention after he learns that Michael somehow knows where Fibonacci is hiding. Although Michael claims that he will give up the information in exchange for help with his escape plan, Abruzzi has two of Michael's toes cut off trying to extract Fibonacci's location from him. This fails and Abruzzi decides to instead team up with Michael to break out of prison. Although their alliance is initially unstable, with both men being wary of each other, Abruzzi and Michael learn to get along as the season progresses. Abruzzi's status as head of PI proves valuable to Michael's escape plan, as the escape team is able to use work on PI to build an escape tunnel.

For some time, the escape plan is threatened when Abruzzi's associate on the outside, Philly Falzone, cuts off Abruzzi's cash stream and takes his prison privileges from him as payback for failing to find Fibonacci. Together, Michael and Abruzzi decides to frame Falzone in the episode "Sleight of Hand", allowing Abruzzi to restore his control of PI. When fellow escapee T-Bag becomes an obstacle, Abruzzi has one of his men on the outside kidnap T-Bag's cousin. The job goes bad, resulting in the death of the cousin as well as his young son. Abruzzi is deeply shaken over the death of the toddler and turns to religion as an outlet for his pain, causing him to spare T-Bag's life even though he had intended to kill him. This proves to be a big mistake, as T-Bag immediately takes the opportunity to slash Abruzzi's throat. He is evacuated by helicopter to receive treatment for his injuries. Abruzzi survives and returns six episodes later in "The Key". Upon his return he appears to have become very religious and friendly; it is soon discovered to be a ploy, as Abruzzi ruthlessly plans to kill most of the team and arranges to kidnap Veronica Donovan to force Fibonacci's location out of Michael, although this fails since Nick Savrinn released Veronica. After the escape, Abruzzi attempts to gun down T-Bag, but he handcuffs himself to Michael to avoid getting shot at. Abruzzi exacts revenge on T-Bag, cutting off his left hand with an axe, the one he attached himself to Michael with. He is one of the group of five who are forced to run on foot after his plane leaves them behind.

Abruzzi appears only briefly in season 2. After being on the run with the other four escapees, he separates from the group and reunites with his family in New York. No longer interested in finding out Fibonacci's location, he plans to flee with his family to Sardinia. He had a sudden change of mind when, one of his thugs informs him about Fibonacci's exact location, but is instead lured into a trap set up by Mahone and the FBI, using Fibonacci as bait. Rather choosing death over returning to prison, Abruzzi raises his weapon and is gunned down, with a cross in hand. He is the first member of the Fox River Eight to be taken down by the authorities.

In season 5, he is revealed to have an older son who did not appear in the original series, named Luca Abruzzi, who Lincoln began working for.

Production details

Peter Stormare, Abruzzi's portrayer, was a member of the regular cast and was featured in every episode before his character's injury in the thirteenth episode of the first season, "End of the Tunnel". After his return to the series six episodes later in "The Key", Stormare became a recurring guest star, appearing in the final four episodes of the first season and in the first, second and fourth episodes of the second season. The character was later killed off in the fourth episode of the second season, "First Down". He later appeared in a brief flashback in the episode "Fin Del Camino."

=== Fernando Sucre ===
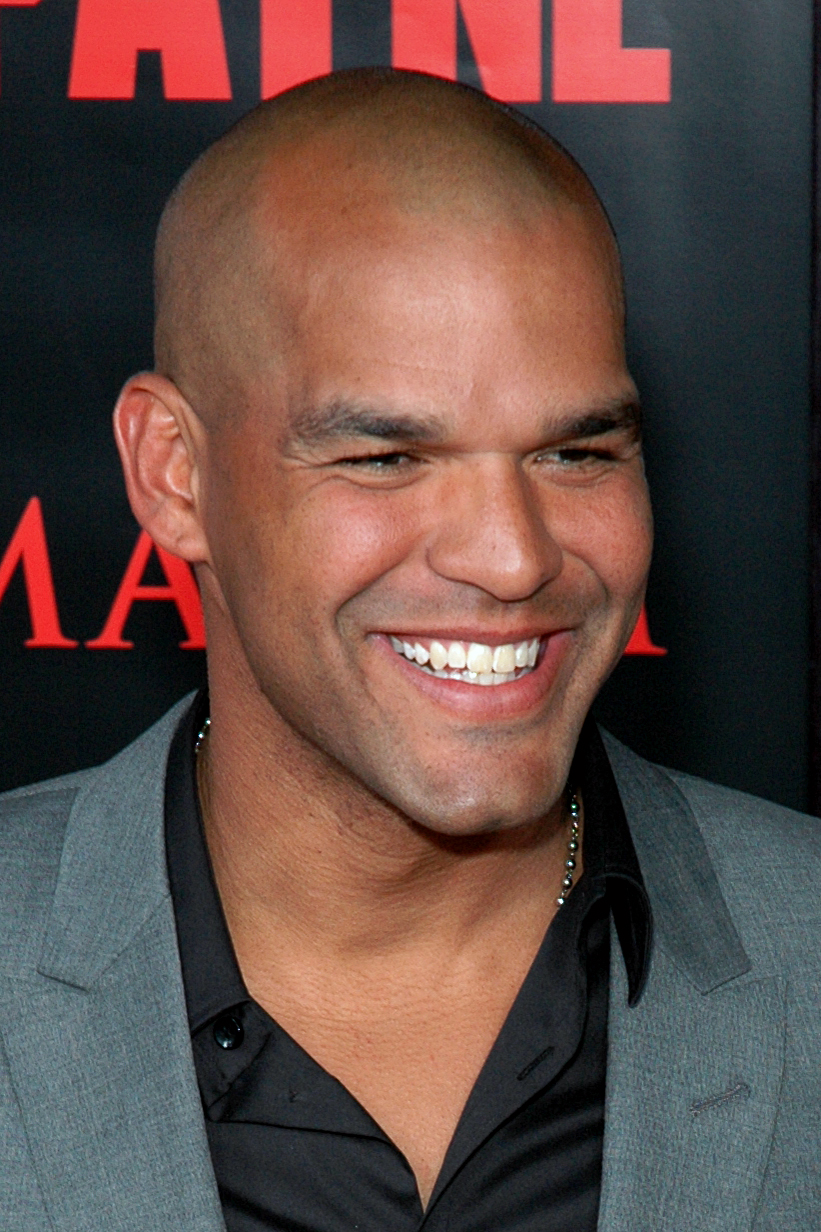
Amaury Nolasco

Fernando Sucre
- Prison Break character
- First appearance: "Pilot" (2005)
- Last appearance: "Progeny" (2017)
- Created by: Paul Scheuring
- Portrayed by: Amaury Nolasco

In-universe information
- Aliases: Jorge Rivera; Mr. Miller
- Occupation: Warehouse worker Sona Grave Digger (season 3)
- Family: Hector Avila (cousin), Manche Sanchez (cousin), Lila Maria Sucre (daughter)
- Spouse: Maricruz Delgado
- Crimes: Aggravated Robbery

Fernando Sucre (played by Amaury Nolasco) is imprisoned at Fox River State Penitentiary for aggravated robbery and was ratted out by the man trying to steal his girlfriend. Of Puerto Rican descent, Sucre grew up in Chicago where he had several run-ins with the law. However, he later finds a steady job at a warehouse and his girlfriend, Maricruz Delgado. He ends up in prison after he attempts to rob a liquor store. Sucre is Michael's cellmate and was one of the first members of the escape plan. Outside, he displayed being able to hot wire various vehicles in record time, which was a valuable asset for Michael and all the other cons that Scofield took with him on the night of the escape. Although the group split apart after the escape Sucre came back to help Michael multiple times. He is part of Self's "A-Team" and plays an important role in getting Scylla. In season 5, he is revealed to now be working on a freighter, and wants to help save Michael from Yemen. Lincoln gently rejects him out of safety, and decides instead to take C-Note, who has a better knowledge of Yemen. However, he does later return to help Michael and his team return to the States from Crete, and later misdirects the conspiracy out to kill them.

=== Lincoln "L. J." Burrows Jr. ===
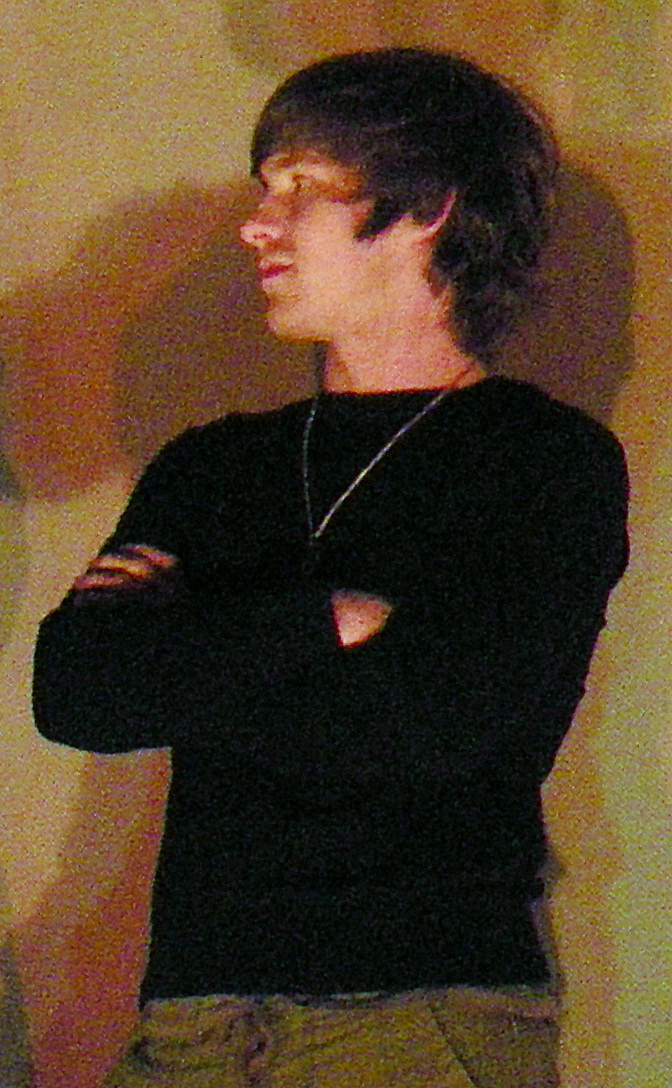
Marshall Allman

Lincoln "L. J." Burrows Jr.
- Prison Break character
- First appearance: "Pilot" (2005)
- Last appearance: "Killing Your Number" (2009)
- Created by: Paul Scheuring
- Portrayed by: Marshall Allman

In-universe information
- Alias: L.J.
- Family: Aldo Burrows (grandfather); Christina Rose Scofield (grandmother); Michael Scofield (uncle); Sara Tancredi (aunt); Lincoln Burrows (father); Lisa Rix (mother); Michael Scofield Jr. (cousin)

Lincoln "L.J." Burrows Jr. (played by Marshall Allman; main: seasons 1–2; recurring: season 3; guest: season 4) is Lincoln's estranged son. Marshall Allman was listed as part of the main cast until the fourteenth episode of the second season, "John Doe". In the pilot episode, despite his normally good behavior, L.J. is arrested for drug possession and put on probation. Part of his punishment is to visit a mentor, his father, once weekly. The first encounter is cold, but their relationship grows warmer, However, L.J. is targeted by conspiracy agents Paul Kellerman and Daniel Hale; after they frame him for the murders of his mother and stepfather, L.J. flees to Veronica Donovan and Nick Savrinn’s secret cabin. Upon discovering Kellerman's alias, he confronts him with a gun to avenge his mother. L. J. is arrested by the police after trying to shoot Kellerman. In season 2, L.J. is visited in jail by Alexander Mahone, who asks for his help to capture Lincoln and Michael; L.J. refuses to co-operate. His family nearly breaks him out of the courthouse, but the escape is foiled and L.J. is sent to an adult detention center. He is later set free in a move by The Company to find Lincoln. Though they are able to outsmart the agents and escape, they are arrested by the police in "Unearthed". They are later saved by people working for Lincoln's father, and L.J. is sent with his grandfather's friend Jane for safety.

In "Wash", L.J. is revealed to be living in Pullman, Washington under a false name. This ends in season 3, where L.J is kidnapped by The Company and held hostage as motivation for Lincoln and Michael to break Whistler out of Sona. After Whistler is broken out, the hostage exchange is successful at a museum, and L.J. is reunited with his father. L.J. appears briefly in the season 4 premiere and is briefly mentioned in the epilogue of the series finale when Lincoln says that L.J. is taking his finals in school, implying that wherever he is, he is doing well. L.J. does not appear in season 5, nor is he mentioned.

=== Bradley "Brad" Bellick ===
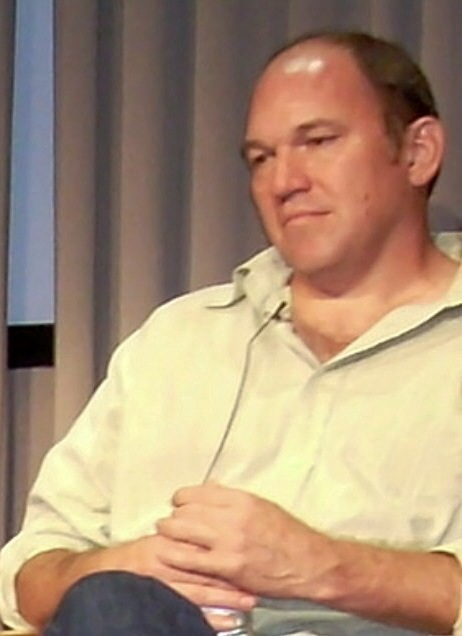
Wade Williams

Bradley Bellick
- Prison Break character
- First appearance: "Pilot" (2005)
- Last appearance: The Conspiracy (2010)
- Created by: Paul Scheuring
- Portrayed by: Wade Williams
- Voiced by: Wade Williams (video game)

In-universe information
- Aliases: Boss; Captain; Brad; Brian; Cap'n
- Occupation: Captain of Fox River Correctional officers Consultant for the FBI; Prisoner
- Family: Edna Bellick (mother)

Bradley Brian "Brad" Bellick (played by Wade Williams; seasons 1–4) is the main prison guard in the Fox River State Penitentiary correctional officers but is later dismissed. He goes after Charles Westmoreland's hidden $5 million, but fails. Set up for murder twice by T-Bag, he ended up incarcerated at Sona. He later escaped from Sona between season's 3 and 4 along with Sucre and T-Bag. After his escape he was recruited to be part of Self's covert "A-Team" assembled to bring down The Company. He drowned while trying to put up a pipe to cross a main water conduit, saving the Scylla plan. It was also stated that Bellick had tried and failed to pass the police academy entrance exam five times. Before his body was sent home to his mother, Mahone placed a badge on his suit which he had acquired from the ball during the episode "Eagles and Angels".

=== Paul Kellerman ===
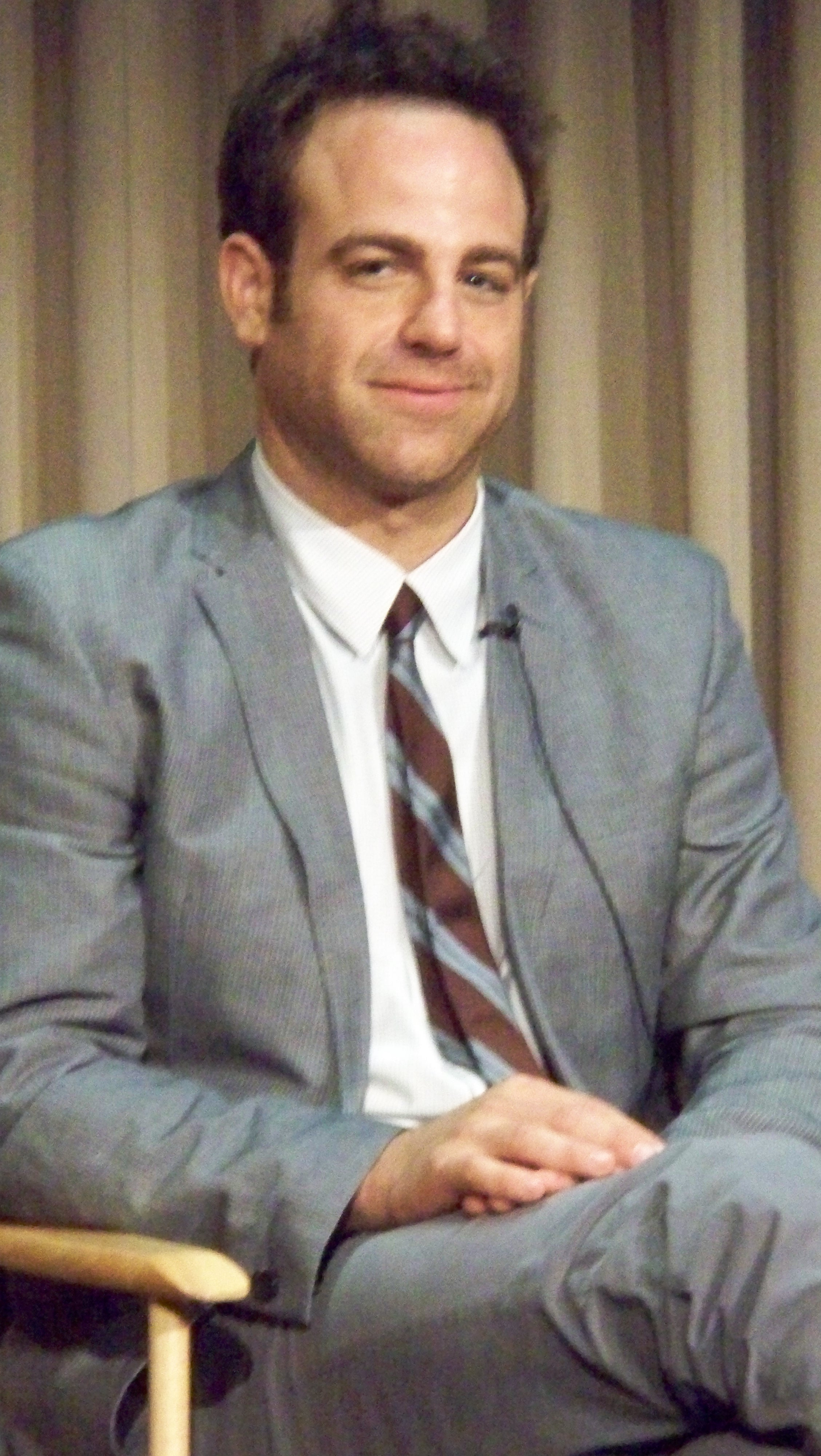
Paul Adelstein

Paul Kellerman (played by Paul Adelstein; main: seasons 1–2 & 5; guest: season 4) is a Secret Service agent who was ordered to make sure Lincoln Burrows is framed and convicted for murder, along with various other illegal acts. He was presumed dead after a shooting after releasing information about The Company at Sara Tancredi's trial at the end of season 2. He is revealed to still be alive at the end of season 4.

In season 5, he is still working for the government, and is also revealed to be married and divorced with joint custody of a daughter. He is killed by Van Gogh.

=== Theodore "T-Bag" Bagwell ===
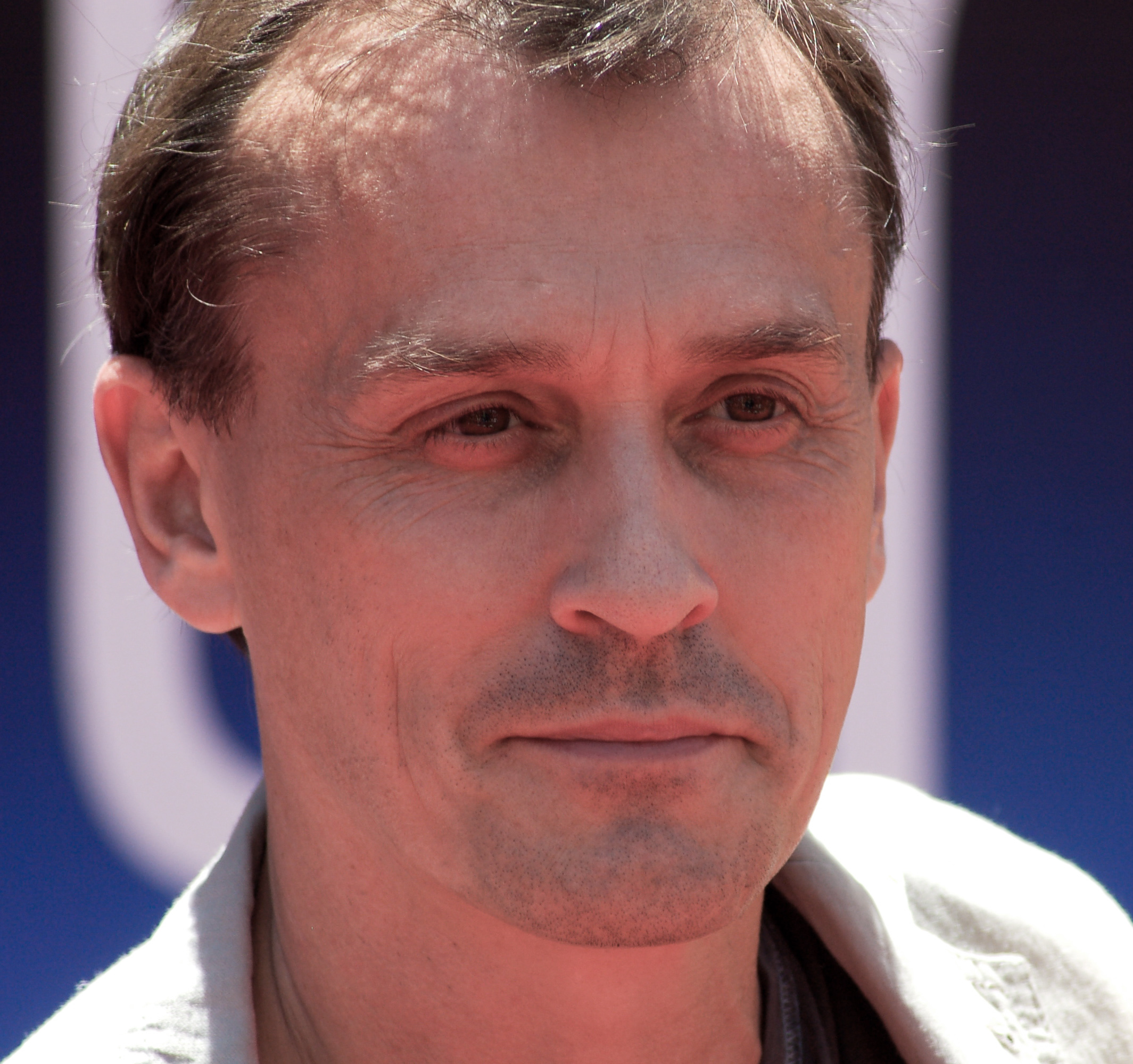
Robert Knepper

Theodore "T-Bag" Bagwell (played by Robert Knepper) is imprisoned at Fox River State Penitentiary with a life sentence for six accounts of kidnapping, rape, and murder. He escapes with Michael's help and reconnects with his previous family by kidnapping them. He frees them after an emotional outbreak, however. He goes to Panama and ends up in Sona for killing a number of prostitutes. T-Bag took over Sona after killing its former ruler, Lechero. However, sometime between season 3 and 4, a riot occurred at Sona, and he, left along with Sucre and Bellick, were on a mission to head back to the US to settle the score with Michael for double-crossing him on the escape from Sona at the end of season 3. He later is forced to be a reluctant member of Self's "A-Team". In season 5, he is released from Fox River and given an operation which gives him a prosthetic hand as functional as a natural one. he is also given a photo which shows Michael is still alive in Yemen, and becomes an unwanted ally of Sara. Though Bagwell initially believed himself to be incapable of fathering a child due to being conceived as a result of inbreeding, Michael reveals to him that he has an illegitimate son in David "Whip" Martin. The chance for a fresh start and family serves as T-Bag's motivation for continuing to assist Michael. When Whip is killed, T-Bag snaps the neck of his killer; and as a result finds himself imprisoned in Fox River; where he exacts further vengeance upon Poseidon, who is assigned his cellmate.

=== Sara Scofield (née Tancredi) ===
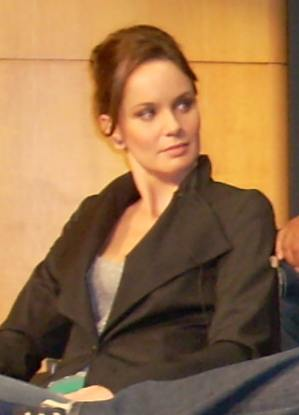
Sarah Wayne Callies

Sara Scofield
- Prison Break character
- First appearance: "Pilot" (2005)
- Last appearance: "Behind The Eyes" (2017)
- Created by: Paul Scheuring
- Portrayed by: Sarah Wayne Callies; Katie A. Keane (S3E3)

In-universe information
- Aliases: Kelli Foster (S2E10); Stephanie Reed (S4E03)
- Occupation: Former prison doctor
- Family: Frank Tancredi (father, deceased); Michael Scofield (husband); Michael (Mike) Scofield, (son); Lincoln Burrows (brother-in-law); L.J. Burrows (nephew)
- Spouses: Michael Scofield (husband); Jacob Anton Ness (ex-husband)
- Nationality: Italian-American

Sara Tancredi (played by Sarah Wayne Callies) is Michael's love interest, and later wife, daughter of the Illinois governor Frank Tancredi, and a doctor working at Fox River State Penitentiary before becoming involved in the conspiracy behind Lincoln Burrows' setup. Raised in Chicago, Sara's ambitions to be a doctor began when she was very young. While at Northwestern University, where she was a Phi Beta Kappa, she was introduced to the works of Mahatma Gandhi and decided to become a humanitarian, which later influenced her decision to work at Fox River State Penitentiary. Another factor which contributed to her occupational choice was her past morphine addiction, culminating in being unable to help a boy after he was run over, because she was high, which was revealed in a flashback episode of the first season, "Brother's Keeper". At 29 years old, Dr. Sara Tancredi was one of the few doctors working at Fox River. Her chosen occupation became a constant source of stress for her father. Sara is the only child of the Governor of Illinois, Frank Tancredi (portrayed by John Heard). Due to her father's hectic political career and vastly differing beliefs, she did not have a close relationship with him. In the episode "Buried", it was revealed that her mother had died.

She eventually shoots a corrupt government agent, William Kim, and Michael takes the fall for it, giving her freedom. Apparently brutally decapitated, her head was placed in the box at the beginning of season 3, though it was later discovered to be a ploy and she is in fact alive. As of season 4, she was part of Self's covert "A-Team" assembled to bring down The Company, and her and Michael are finally in a committed relationship. Despite being apart in previous seasons, throughout season 4 they are clearly at ease and comfortable in each other's company and rely heavily on each other throughout. When Michael is having tests done in the hospital, Sara tells the duty nurse that Michael is her husband so she has access to his test results. Michael responds with "that has a nice ring to it" when she tells him. Sara is devastated by Michael's apparent death at the end of the season, but finds comfort in carrying a part of Michael with her always in their son.

In season 5, she has remarried, is raising Michael's son alongside her husband, and is somewhat reluctant to believe Michael is still alive.

=== Benjamin Miles "C-Note" Franklin ===
Benjamin Miles Franklin
- Prison Break character
- First appearance: "Pilot" (2005)
- Last appearance: "Progeny" (2017)
- Created by: Paul Scheuring
- Portrayed by: Rockmond Dunbar

In-universe information
- Alias: C-Note
- Title: First Sergeant
- Affiliation: U.S. Army
- Family: Dede Franklin (daughter); Darius Morgan (brother-in-law); Trey Morgan (brother-in-law)
- Spouse: Kacee Franklin
- Religion: Islam

Benjamin Miles "C-Note" Franklin (played by Rockmond Dunbar; main: seasons 1–2 & 5; guest: season 4) is imprisoned at Fox River for possession of stolen goods. He escapes prison and reconnects successfully with his family. All charges against him are dropped after he reveals certain secrets about Alexander Mahone. He and his family are safe and were then put in witness protection at the end of season 2. C-Note returns at the end of season 4 with Sucre to help Michael, Lincoln & the rest of the team against The Company. In season 5, it is revealed that C-Note has converted to Islam, and accompanies Lincoln to Yemen after finding evidence that Michael is still alive.

=== Alexander Mahone ===
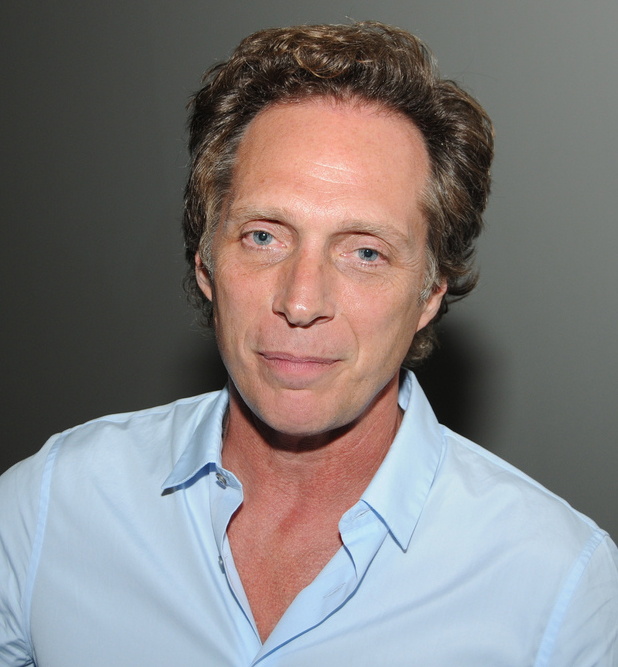
William Fichtner

Alexander Mahone (played by William Fichtner; seasons 2–5) is an FBI Special Agent, who is put in charge of the nationwide manhunt for the Fox River escapees. He is responsible for the deaths of three of the Fox River Eight. In turn, Michael sets him up for possession of cocaine, which leads to his incarceration at Sona, as well. He escaped from Sona with Michael and Whistler at the end of season 3, and is now part of Self's covert "A-Team" assembled to bring down The Company in season 4.

=== James Whistler ===
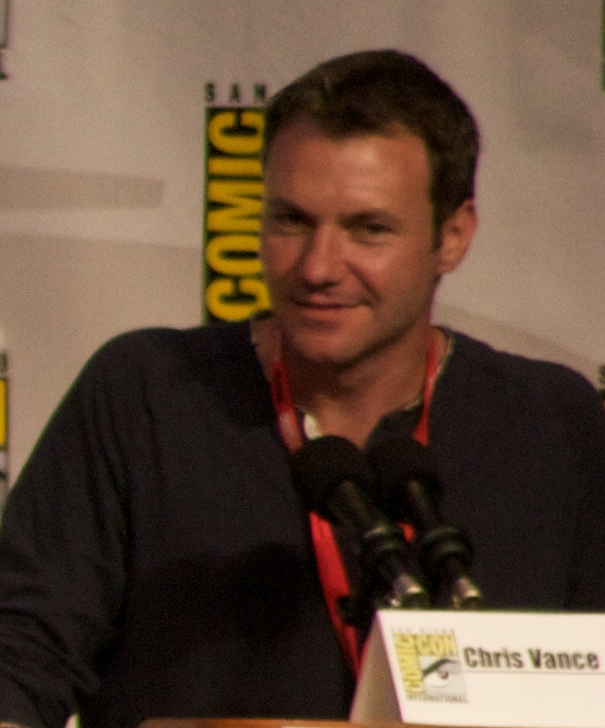
Chris Vance

James Whistler
- Prison Break character
- First appearance: "Orientación" (2007)
- Last appearance: "Scylla" (2008)
- Created by: Paul Scheuring
- Portrayed by: Chris Vance

In-universe information
- Aliases: McFadden; Gary Miller; Cole Pfeiffer
- Affiliation: The Company
- Significant other: Sofia Lugo
- Origin: Australia

Little is known about his background, though throughout season 3 James Whistler (played by Chris Vance; seasons 3–4) repeatedly claimed to be a simple fisherman from Kalbarri, Western Australia who ran charters between Panama and the Pacific North West.

He is in the Panamanian jail known as Sona for the murder of the son of the mayor of Panama City during a bar fight, although he claims he is innocent. This resulted in a bounty being placed on his head, as the mayor offered to free (via a corrupt judge) any inmate who would kill Whistler, forcing Whistler to go into hiding in the sewers after he arrived at the prison. His only contact with the outside world was his girlfriend Sofía, who obliviously believes in his innocence. Breaking him out of Sona became Michael Scofield's primary mission during season 3, though Whistler and his mysterious background causes tension between both men as various aspects of Whistler's background (most notably the story that he is needed to be freed in order to deliver vaguely explained "coordinates" recorded within a bird watcher guidebook Whistler carries with him at all times) cause Michael to question whether or not he is helping an innocent man caught in the vast web of conspiracies of The Company, as Whistler claims to be.

He is first seen in "Orientación" hiding within a crawlspace below the room of Lechero, the de facto leader of the prison. When he first saw Brad Bellick, he offered him food in return for a favor. When a fight broke out between two inmates (one of whom was Michael Scofield) Bellick was to place a note on each of the two inmates in order to get more food from Whistler. He was apparently attempting to send a message to Sofía Lugo. Sofía found the note, which read "VERSAILLES 1989 V. MADRID", and lead her to a bank lock-box containing what appeared to be a bird guide. The book was then stolen by Lincoln Burrows.

The Company seems to have an interest in Whistler, and this is apparently the reason Michael's incarceration in Sona was arranged in the first place. Due to the political spotlight on him, The Company were unable to get him out. Initially, Whistler is seemingly unaware of why The Company wants him. One of The Company's operatives, Elliott Pike, approached Michael and offered their support if he breaks Whistler out. When he refused, another operative, who called herself only by the obviously false name Susan B. Anthony, approached Michael's brother Lincoln Burrows and informed them that Lincoln's son L. J. Burrows and Michael's girlfriend Sara Tancredi were being held hostage by The Company and would be killed if Michael didn't break Whistler out within a week.

After the bounty on his head and his location is discovered by both Michael and Mahone, Mahone delivers him to prison boss Lechero. Fortunately, Lechero chooses to remove the bounty on Whistler at Michael's request, giving up the reward of freedom from the mayor, after Michael restores water to the prison. Whistler tries to befriend Mahone in an effort to get information on Scofield. Later he reveals why The Company is interested in him. They want to know where Whistler took a certain naturalist to during one of his charters. But he needs the bird guide, which is actually his trip log to retrace his steps and take The Company to that location.

In "Good Fences", the bird guide is returned to him with the warning that he is running out of time. Meanwhile, he asks Sofía to look into Scofield and Burrows because he doesn't trust any of them. Also he tells Sofía The Company is interested in him because of a charter he did in Seattle. Michael instructs Whistler to spy on one of the tower guards to learn their behavior. Whistler observes a window of 6 minutes where the sun's glare forces the guard to look away. When it is revealed he covers for Michael by claiming to be a bird lover. Meanwhile, a new inmate, Tyge claims to know him, calling him by the name McFadden and seeing him in 1997 in Nice at the Ambassador hotel, thus casting doubt on his story in Michael's eyes.

Tyge is murdered and Whistler is suspected after McGrady tips off Lechero that the two had an argument. His life is in danger until Michael manages to intervene. In Vamonos it is later revealed that Whistler has been deceitful with Michael, and has actually been working with Gretchen (Susan B. Anthony), and that it is he who is orchestrating his break from Sona. Susan aka Gretchen tells him the plan Bang and Burn is in effect, which both dismissed as suicide until Pad Man says it is the only option after Michael failed to take James out of Sona. While James gets to the roof of Sona during a military helicopter rescue of him, Michael Scofield, knowing his position is dead without him, stops the prison break. Scofield was then taken away to confess what he knew about the helicopter squad.

Scofield's confession caused Whistler to be implicated. In the subsequent torture, Whistler revealed Gretchen Morgan, the woman who had been orchestrating the entire escape. After learning that Gretchen escaped from the Sona guards clutches, both Whistler and Scofield returned to Sona. Whistler, Michael, Mahone, and McGrady later escape from Sona, Lechero is shot and injured, while T-Bag and Bellick are caught during the escape. He realizes he lost his book during his escape. After getting out of Sona, Whistler manages to escape from Michael and Lincoln but is then caught again. The exchange for L. J. and him goes well, but it is realized there never were coordinates in the bird book. He tries to explain to Sofía, but at this point she wants nothing to do with him. He escapes with Gretchen and The Company. He is later seen making a deal with Mahone to join up with The Company and Mahone, Gretchen, and he drives away.

Whistler appears briefly in the season 4 premiere. After he betrays The Company by planning to steal Scylla, he is shot and killed by Company hitman Wyatt. A later episode reveals that he had arranged to sell Scylla to the Chinese, rather than handing it over to the government.

=== Norman "Lechero" St. John ===
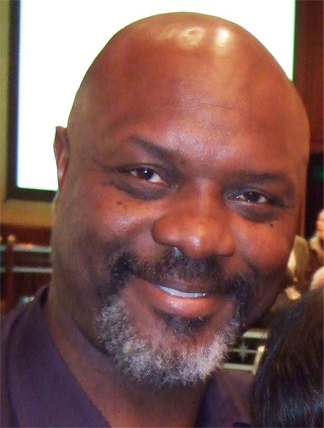
Robert Wisdom

Norman St. John
- Prison Break character
- First appearance: "Orientación" (2007)
- Last appearance: "The Art of the Deal" (2008)
- Created by: Paul Scheuring
- Portrayed by: Robert Wisdom

In-universe information
- Alias: Lechero
- Occupation: Drug kingpin
- Significant other: Mary Francis
- Origin: Panama

Norman "Lechero" St. John (played by Robert Wisdom; season 3) is a Panamanian drug kingpin incarcerated at Sona, where he is the leader of the prison and is at the top of the prison hierarchy. He appears only in season 3 where his role is similar of that of John Abruzzi in season 1. Ruthless and violent, he earned the nickname "Lechero" when he, at the age of 13, disguised himself as a lechero (milkman) in order to kill his mother's rapist. The character serves as an antagonist and enemy to the protagonists in the early episodes of season 3, but later becomes an uneasy ally. Lechero is introduced in the season 3 premiere episode "Orientación". Aware of Michael Scofield's ventures as a fugitive from the United States, Lechero views him as a threat to his rule and plots to get rid of him by setting Michael up in a fight to the death with another prisoner. However, Michael survives. Lechero also meets T-Bag in this episode and accepts him as his underling. The relationship between him and Michael continues to be characterized by deceit and mistrust in the next few episodes, like in "Call Waiting", when Michael steals Lechero's cell phone. But Lechero learns in "Fire/Water", that Michael can be useful as well when he restores water to the prison. Lechero grows increasingly paranoid as the season progresses, and is later tricked by T-Bag that his cronies are planning a coup against him, successfully manipulating Lechero to enlist T-Bag as a spy.

In "Good Fences", Lechero gets in trouble when the electrical system in the prison stops functioning. Remembering that Michael is an engineer, he quickly enlists Michael's help to fix the system, in exchange for a new cell in the prison block. He is later approached by Bellick, who warns him that Michael cannot be trusted and that he will trick Lechero as he tricked Bellick. At first Lechero is skeptical but then he decides to see for himself, and when Michael successfully outwits him and repairs the prison's electrical system, his trust in Michael is solidified. He later punishes Bellick for the bad information by scalding him with hot coffee. In "Photo Finish" Lechero slits Cheo for taking tribute from Augusto (It was actually Sammy). In "Vámonos" after Michael's failed escape, Lechero informs him that he will break out of prison, but with one catch—he must take Lechero with him. In the following episode "Bang & Burn", Lechero reveals a tunnel which they can use to escape. in the episode "Hell or High Water" Lechero is shot by the guards during the Sona Escape. In the following episode "The Art of the Deal" T-Bag and Bellick come to Lechero's aid. T-Bag tells Lechero that the guards will let them go for $50,000. Lechero calls his girlfriend who brings T-Bag the money. After getting the money T-Bag takes his place as the leader of Sona by suffocating Lechero with a pillow while Bellick stands by and watches in terror.

=== Sofía Lugo ===
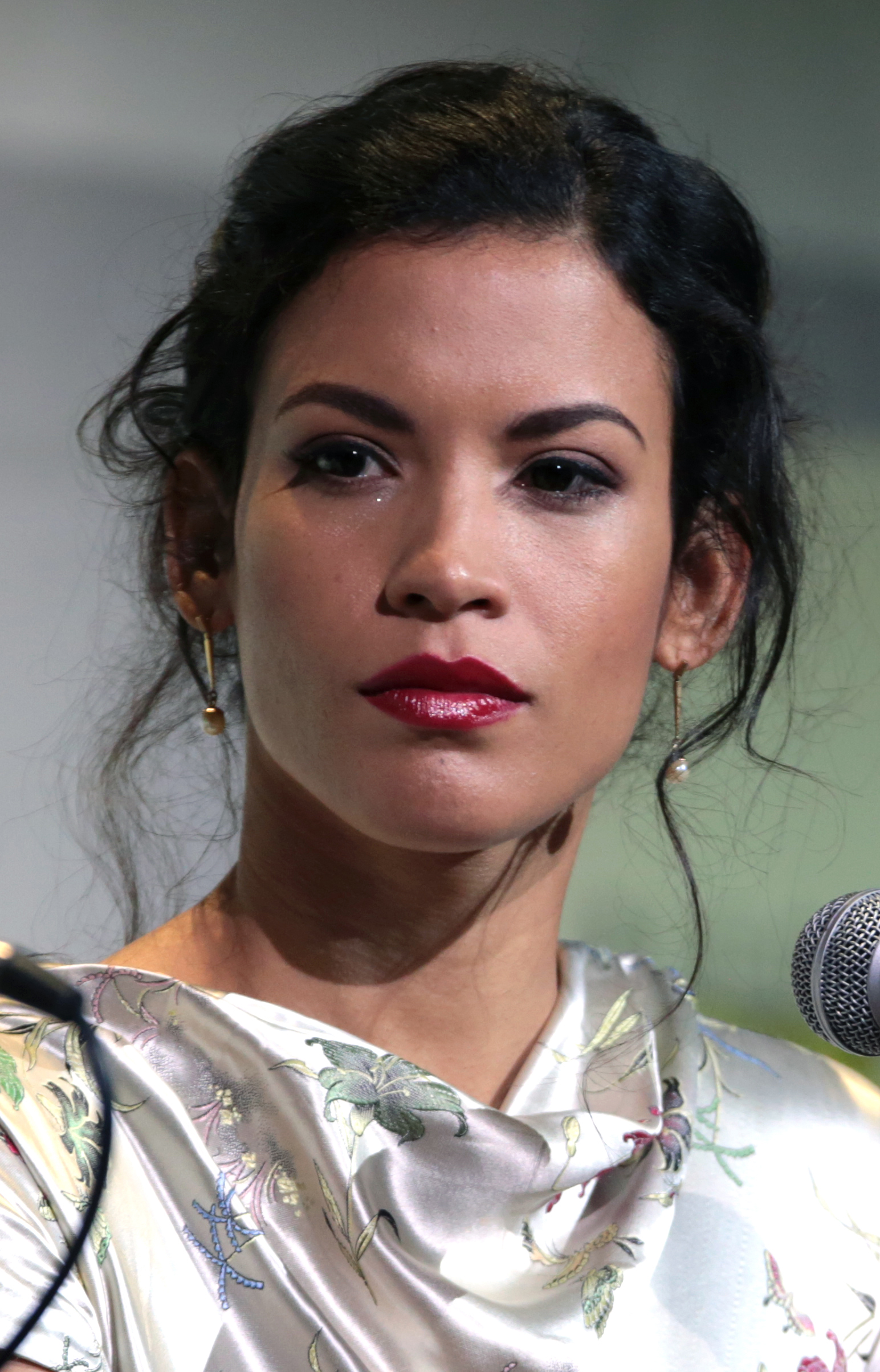
Danay García

Sofía Lugo
- Prison Break character
- First appearance: "Orientación" (2007)
- Last appearance: "Killing Your Number" (2009)
- Created by: Paul Scheuring
- Portrayed by: Danay García

In-universe information
- Significant others: James Whistler; Lincoln Burrows
- Origin: Panama

Sofía Lugo (played by Danay García; seasons 3–5) is the girlfriend of James Whistler. Having worked with Lincoln to help Michael break out Whistler in season 3, she is with LJ in season 4, though their whereabouts are unknown. The character is introduced to the series as a regular in the premiere episode of the third season of the series. Sofía Lugo is first seen posing as the wife of a dead inmate and a gravedigger, in order to get James Whistler's message written to her, transferred via the dead bodies. Sofía finds the note, which refers to a bank lock-box in a bank where a bird guide is contained. The book is then stolen by Lincoln Burrows and tells her to tell Whistler that he has it now. She meets Whistler in Sona, who keeps her in the dark about Scofield as he feared that Sofía might be killed if she knew too much. On her way out, she sees the visitation log, figures the connection, and notes Lincoln's hotel and room number. She tails Lincoln to Saint Rita and confronts him. Lincoln tells her about the escape plan.

In "Good Fences", Sofía meets Whistler who demands to know the truth. He relents, telling her of The Company's interest in him and telling her to gather information on the brothers. Afterward, she meets Lincoln at his hotel wanting to help in the escape. Lincoln enlists her as an impromptu translator for Lincoln and the gravedigger. Sofía helps to bargain with the price of the car of the gravedigger, who is killed shortly after by Gretchen. She also accompanies Lincoln to bury the scuba gear and provides assistance, such as helping to drug one of the guards and hatching the escape plan for Scofield and James Whistler. She seemed to not completely trust Lincoln but in "Bang & Burn", she discovers Whistler's other identity and house, which casts doubt into her mind. A romantic connection begins to appear between Lincoln and Sofía due to her problems of mistrust with her boyfriend James Whistler. Later, in an attempt to force Whistler to give the coordinates, Sofía is captured and tortured by Gretchen Morgan.

In the season finale, after the exchange, Sofía decided to break up with Whistler, when she realized that she could no longer trust him. Sofía was shot by one of The Company members in "The Art of the Deal", but has not yet given in to the extent of her injuries. As she recovers in the hospital, she tells Michael to retrieve a box from her apartment which she had found, containing files on a man named Jason Lief. As Michael leaves to find Whistler, Lincoln and LJ decided to stay back to take care of Sofía.

Sofía appears briefly in the premiere episode of season 4, shopping with Lincoln and LJ, but when Lincoln kills a Company agent and is arrested, Sofía and L. J. run for it.

She reappears in the finale of season 4. She is held captive by Company agents but is released unharmed by the General after Sucre and C-Note apprehend him. Four years later, she is shown to be romantically involved with Lincoln.

Sofía does not appear in season 5, but in "Progeny" Lincoln mentions that he and Sofía have broken up.

=== Gretchen Morgan ===
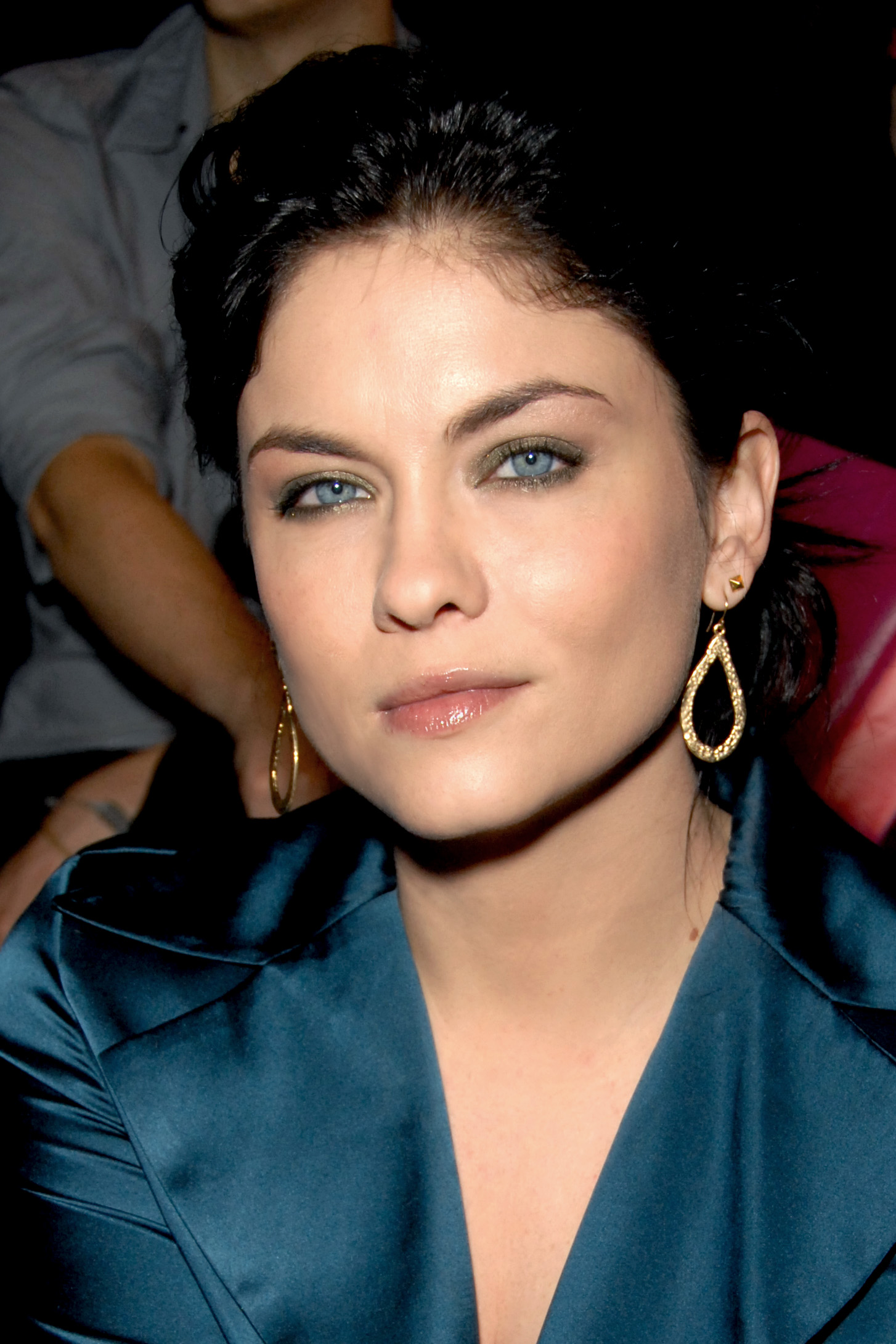
Jodi Lyn O'Keefe

Gretchen Morgan
- Prison Break character
- First appearance: "Orientación" (2007)
- Last appearance: The Final Break (2009)
- Created by: Paul Scheuring
- Portrayed by: Jodi Lyn O'Keefe

In-universe information
- Alias: Susan B. Anthony
- Family: Rita Morgan (sister); Emily Morgan (daughter)
- Significant other: Jonathan Krantz

Gretchen Louise Morgan (played by Jodi Lyn O'Keefe; seasons 3–4), sometimes operating under the alias Susan B. Anthony, is introduced to the series in the third season as a high-ranking Company field-operative in charge of Whistler's breakout from Sona. Despite claiming to have killed Sara, season 4 revealed she lied and Sara is in fact alive. Gretchen finds herself in The Company's cross hairs after the Whistler/Scylla disaster and later is forced out of necessity to aid Self's "A-Team" against her former employers. She is ruthless and impatient, performing swift executions without hesitation if there is any obstacle to her plan, but is known to have a soft side for the few individuals that she cares about, for example her daughter. She is shown to be able to withstand torture and is exceptionally skilled in martial arts. Her character is mainly an antagonist, and later an occasional, uneasy ally to the protagonists. Gretchen is the main antagonist of the third season. The character is first seen covering scratch wounds on her face with makeup. Later, she meets up with Lincoln at a bar and informs him that The Company has kidnapped both Sara and LJ, and that in order for them to survive, Michael must break James Whistler out of Sona prison. When Lincoln tries to rescue both of them, she claimed to have personally beheaded Sara and warned the brothers not to play games. Gretchen provides assistance to both of the brothers so that their plan would work, such as money for the gravedigger (whom she eventually executed as she suspected that he might report them to the police) and a drug that could help silence a guard. When she finds out that Lincoln is trying to drug the guard much earlier than the hostage exchange time, she becomes furious and moves to behead the fearful LJ, but is stopped when Lincoln reveals the truth. When the escape ultimately fails, Gretchen's supervisor, General Krantz, forced her to carry out the "Bang and Burn" Operation, which involved flying helicopters into Sona to retrieve Whistler. Due to Michael's intervention, this operation fails. Hoping that Lincoln could once again be included into the plan, Gretchen allowed Lincoln to meet his son at an abandoned shack. Michael's confession caused her to be subsequently tortured by waterboarding by Sona guards. However, Gretchen was able to escape from their clutches. James Whistler later revealed that her real name is Gretchen Morgan. Following Michael and Whistler's escape from Sona, Gretchen was able to extract Whistler safely, but she failed to eliminate the brothers. In her final appearance of the season, she is seen driving away in a car with Whistler and Mahone (who had seemingly made a deal with Whistler to work for The Company after the escape).

In the season 4 premiere, Gretchen appears with Whistler on a mission to retrieve one of the Scylla cards, which fails when Whistler betrays The Company by stealing the original card, and Gretchen is punished by the general for her failure. Initially assumed dead, she is revealed to be alive at the end of "Breaking and Entering", locked away and tortured for information. She has only a minimal role in the next few episodes, but finally escapes custody in the fifth episode. "Blow Out" fleshes out her character when Gretchen takes shelter at her sister's house. It is revealed that Rita's child Emily is actually Gretchen's daughter, and the character shows her first hints of a softer side when they appear in scenes together. Following this, Gretchen recovers and enters the main plot to obtain Scylla. She tracks down T-Bag, who is in possession of Whistler's bird book, and forces him to co-operate. She eventually becomes a reluctant ally to Michael and his team, which includes Sara. In an effort to make amends with Sara, whom Gretchen tortured in Panama, she meets with her in "The Price" and offers her to get even by whipping Gretchen with a bullwhip. Sara declines, instead stating that Gretchen will one day pay for the guard she murdered that helped Sara escape. In "Greatness Achieved", Gretchen is revealed to be a former lover of the General (who is also the father of her daughter, Emily) when she infiltrates his office with a gun seeking revenge. While she appears to soften at his manipulations, it is later revealed that she is merely playing along to gain inside information.

Gretchen and T-Bag serve mainly as wild cards in these episodes, playing Michael's team, with their real plan revealed to be using them to get Scylla, only to then steal it and sell it to a Chinese crime syndicate for 125 million. In their scenes together, Gretchen is often the more ruthless character, while T-Bag appears more hesitant as he grows attached to salesman Cole Pfeiffer, the alias he is living under to facilitate the break-in. In order to speed things along, Gretchen accepts the task of trying to steal the general's Scylla card by seducing him in "Quite Riot". He uncovers her true motivation, however, and she barely survives by pleading with him, confirming to the viewers that he is the father of her child. On the day of the break-in to steal Scylla, Gretchen and T-Bag stake out the Gate corporation with machine guns, preparing to ambush the team when they return. Gretchen and a reluctant T-Bag take the entire company hostage when someone spots her gun, and they are forced to flee when a federal agent arrives. In the next few episodes, Gretchen shares a plotline with Don Self, a Homeland Security agent that Michael's team reports to. After betraying the team and taking Scylla, Self threatens the life of Gretchen's daughter for her to help him find a new buyer. Gretchen complies and in "Going Under" they meet with the buyer, but fails when men appear to take them into Company custody. Following this, she is forced by the general to work with Self, Lincoln and T-Bag to recover Scylla. Her character is later written out when she is shot by the buyer and the rest of the team leave her behind to be arrested by the police.

In The Final Break, Gretchen is shown to be an inmate in the prison that, Sara is taken to, for the murder of Christina Scofield Hampton. When Gretchen sees Lincoln and Sucre standing outside the prison, she demands that, Sara take her along in any escape plan so that, they may be developing. Well initially threatening, Gretchen eventually reveals to Sara that, she simply desires to see her daughter, Emily and to give her a necklace, which she had made herself. She, proves her loyalty, by saving Sara from an attacker looking to collect a bounty put out, by the General, who is incarcerated in a neighboring prison. When the escape commences, Gretchen attacks a guard and gets stabbed in the leg. Knowing that, she cannot escape, without any help at all, Gretchen asks Sara to choose to, either leave her behind or help her and Sara lends her hand. Finally, as Sara and Gretchen are on their way, Gretchen is spotted by guards. When asked, whether or not she is alone, Gretchen refuses to reveal Sara's presence, and gets taken back into custody. This is the last time she is seen. But leaving, Sara sees the necklace that, Gretchen had, made for her daughter on the ground and knowing that, she would have been caught had Gretchen betrayed her, Sara secures it, so that, she may pass it along to Emily.

=== Donald "Don" Self ===
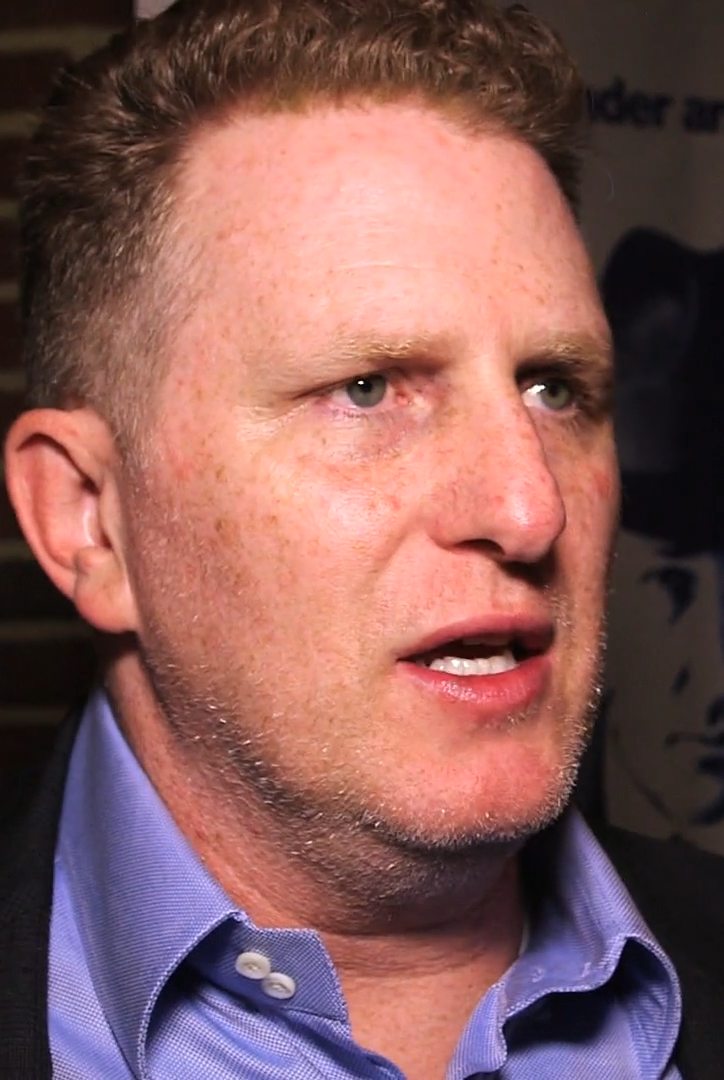
Michael Rapaport

Don Self
- Prison Break character
- First appearance: "Scylla" (2008)
- Last appearance: "Killing Your Number" (2009)
- Created by: Paul Scheuring; Matt Olmstead
- Portrayed by: Michael Rapaport

In-universe information
- Aliases: Don; Robert Walker
- Occupation: Agent of the Department of Homeland Security

Donald "Don" Self (played by Michael Rapaport; season 4) is an ICE Homeland Security Investigations (DHS) special agent introduced in the fourth-season premiere. After their arrest, he recruits the protagonists and several other characters into a covert "A-Team" of sorts in a mission to take down The Company once and for all. The character plays a prominent role in the last season. Not much is known about him but he is stated as a hardworking Homeland Security Agent who tries to bring down The Company but has yet to be successful. He has worked for five years to bring down The Company with James Whistler and Aldo Burrows (Michael and Lincoln's father), the latter has also tried to locate Scylla. According to a background check made on the character by The Company in the episode "Five the Hard Way", Self studied law on Long Island, before spending the next 18 years moving around DOD and DOJ. He began working for Homeland Security in 2002. Agent Self later told Mahone that he had a wife that died while giving birth - his unborn infant died too. A picture of his wife is seen at his desk several times and he once played a message of her voice at his answering machine. The truth about his wife's fate is revealed near the end of the season. Self's character plays the role of supervisor and ally to the team in the first half of the season, but later becomes an antagonist. In "Scylla", he tasks Lincoln Burrows and Michael Scofield with the mission of bringing down The Company and finding "Scylla", a key card that stores a wealth of information about The Company. He promises them full exoneration if the brothers can obtain Scylla and hand it over to the government. As Sucre, Mahone, Bellick, Sara, and Roland Glenn, a computer hijacker, come along with them, Self points out that if they do it there is no coming back and that he is their boss. The partnership with Self is not without friction, however. Most notably in "Shut Down" were Self, under pressure from his boss, reluctantly tries to cancel the mission after it is discovered that Scylla is six key cards, not just one. Self agrees to let them find the rest of the Scylla cards after the team successfully identifies the other cardholders. In other episodes throughout the season, however, the character provides active assistance to the team, like in "Safe and Sound" where Self, although overtly pessimistic about their chances, agree to help by first contriving an excuse to enter a cardholder's office and later in the episode by luring someone out of his office for lunch, leaving the team to get to a safe which contains a Scylla card. He also has his computer analysts identify the rest of the cardholders from the picture taken with Michael's cell phone.

When General Krantz, the leader of The Company, discovers Self had images of him enhanced, Wyatt confronts Self and tells him that the General "likes his privacy." Taking Mahone's advice; to get aggressive, Self meets the General face-to-face and blackmails him, threatening to reveal to the public missions he was involved in, thus making it harder for The Company to remain covert. As the season unfolds, Self's character begins to show tendencies of a more ruthless side. He often threatens to kill those who oppose him, and in "Blow Out", after Mahone becomes a liability to the mission by getting arrested by the police, Self wants to have Mahone killed, something Michael refuses to do. Instead the team rescue Mahone, without Self's assistance. In "The Legend" the team grows a dislike for Self when he seems unwilling to hold up his end of the deal and send Bellick's body home after he died in the previous episode. However, in "Quiet Riot", he is actively supportive of the mission and seems to genuinely want to bring down The Company. Self's character shows his true colours in the episode "Selfless", where he apparently works with the team as they finally manage to recover the Scylla, but ultimately betrays both them and his government superiors by stealing the recovered Scylla and keeping it for himself. His real character motivation is revealed to be finding a "buyer" for Scylla, an apparently private interest. Realizing that the needs to find a new buyer after the first one is killed, Self murders his partner, federal agent Miriam Holtz, in cold blood in order to get to T-Bag, a prisoner she was guarding. From this point onwards, the character begins to share a more active role in the plot by being out in the field and appearing in more action-oriented scenes. In the next few episodes, he is an antagonist to Michael and the rest of the team. After faking his death and attempting to frame Michael's team for it in "Deal or No Deal", Self uses T-Bag to track down the family of Gretchen Morgan, a former Company operative that has gone rogue. Self threatens the life of her daughter to gain her co-operation and the two characters share the same plotline for the next few episodes, as they use Gretchen's contacts to find another buyer for Scylla. However, at the end of the episode, Self finds himself with a problem: the mistrust of Michael Scofield, who removed a part of the Scylla device. While his apprehension of T-Bag led to Gretchen and a buyer, he cannot sell Scylla while it is incomplete. Thus, the episode ends with him ultimately demanding the missing part of Scylla from Michael, who instead suggests he "Come and get it".

In the next episode, "Just Business" Self seemingly makes a deal with Michael to sell Scylla together, while both parties are actually plotting against each other. Self and Gretchen plants an x-ray device in the warehouse to try to find the missing piece of scylla while the team are planning to take the rest of Scylla back from Self. In the end it is Self who is successful, as he and Gretchen obtains the missing piece and head out to meet Gretchen's contact, a conduit named Vikan. Self's character is again shown to be ruthless when, after asking Vikan if the buyer of Scylla is coming, Self shoots Vikan and his bodyguards and tosses their corpse into the sea so that he does not have to share a cut of the money with them. Self is next seen waiting with Gretchen for the Scylla buyer. After getting a call from Gretchen's sister, Rita, Gretchen tells Self that The Company has T-Bag and unfortunately he might have told The Company where they are. So before Lincoln and Sucre could track them, Self and Gretchen destroy their cell phones and flee. They're next seen at a phone store and look injured with bloody scratches on their faces. They buy a new phone and tell the store owner not to tell anyone they were there. They head to the warehouse to wait for the buyer. The buyer arrives and Self and Gretchen hold the buyer at gunpoint. Gretchen forces Self to hand Scylla to the buyer or they will be in grave danger. Self hands over Scylla. They hear noise and Self and Gretchen go to investigate, but are betrayed by the buyer when he points his gun at them and they run for cover and a shootout occurs. The buyer shoots Self in the shoulder and flees with the money and Scylla. Later they are to work with Lincoln and T-Bag to recover Scylla. Self's character plays a less prominent role in the season's final episodes, where he works with his new team to find Scylla and track down the new buyer, which turns out to be Lincoln and Michael's mother, Christina Rose Scofield. When the team fails in their assignment, the general decides to punish them by ordering the death of one of their family members and singles out Self's wife, who is actually alive and in a persistent vegetative state due to Self's drunk and reckless behavior. Self then escapes, but gets arrested at the hospital, where one of Christina's men injects him with a serum that gradually leaves him in the same state his wife was in. He refuses to help federal agents with locating Burrows and Scofield because they failed at protecting him, and is left in his vegetative state for the rest of his life. In his final appearance in the epilogue of the Series Finale, set four years after the events of the rest of the episode, Self is revealed to be living at a rest facility, using a wheelchair, mute and drooling.

=== Jacob Anton Ness ===
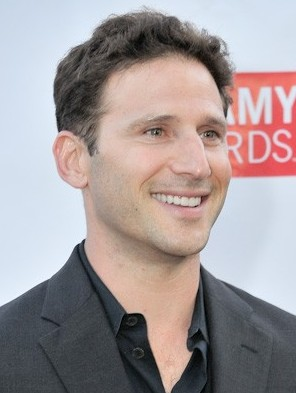
Mark Feuerstein

Jacob Anton Ness
- Prison Break character
- First appearance: "Ogygia" (2017)
- Last appearance: "Behind The Eyes" (2017)
- Created by: Paul Scheuring
- Portrayed by: Mark Feuerstein

In-universe information
- Alias: Poseidon
- Family: Michael Scofield Jr. (stepson)
- Spouse: Sara Tancredi

Jacob Anton Ness (played by Mark Feuerstein; season 5) is an economics professor at University of Syracuse, and Sara's second husband and Mike's stepfather. He and Sara were married sometime during the seven years after Michael's supposed death. In the season premiere, he is shot in the leg by someone supposedly sent to kill Sara and Mike due to Lincoln investigating Michael's death, and spends the next two episodes recovering in the hospital. During this time, Sara finds out Michael is still alive under the name Kaniel Outis, and tells him. He tells her that Michael may have succumbed to madness due to the choices he made. After being released, he, Sara and Mike lie low at his parents' lake house per Sara's choice, though he says the university has resources that can be used to find their attackers. T-Bag eventually tracks the attackers to a meeting with him. Sara confronts him on this, and he claims he was paying them off to leave him alone, and later seems to prove this by having them arrested with a tracker in the money, forgiving Sara for her paranoia. However, Michael later reveals him to be "Poseidon", a rogue CIA agent that he has been working for in exchange for exoneration of himself and others. Michael also reveals that he murdered the CIA agent Michael's alias is accused of having murdered. Sara returns to New York and tries to pretend she does not know, but he sees through this immediately, and captures her and Mike. Michael, Lincoln and their contacts try to catch him, and manage to track him to his lake house, but he seemingly turns the tables and has one of his subordinates ambush Michael and Mike, with Sara's fate unknown. He is ultimately caught and incarcerated at Fox River, where he is attacked by T-Bag as retribution for Whip's death.

=== Sheba ===
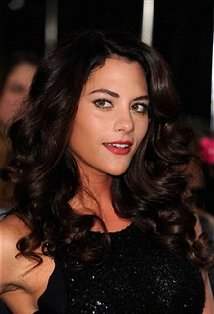
Inbar Lavi

Sheba
- Prison Break character
- First appearance: "Ogygia" (2017)
- Last appearance: "Behind the Eyes" (2017)
- Created by: Paul Scheuring
- Portrayed by: Inbar Lavi

In-universe information
- Occupation: Resistance smuggler
- Nationality: Yemeni

Sheba (played by Inbar Lavi; season 5) is a woman who leads a resistance movement in Yemen, and C-Note's contact when he and Lincoln arrive. She allows the two to visit Ogygia, and later helps them rescue a man who can help them facilitate Michael's escape, as well as his daughter and several schoolgirls, from ISIL. She and Lincoln later attempt to get fake passports, but are captured, and she is nearly raped by a one-eyed man who had a crush on her in high school, but is saved by Lincoln. She and C-Note bring the people they saved from ISIL to an airport and manage to get on board a small plane, but are forced to leave without Michael, Lincoln and their fellow escapees. They make it to Jordan, and eventually back to the States, where she and C-Note regroup with Michael and Lincoln, and help them track down Poseidon and his subordinates to find Sara and Mike. Eventually, when Michael figures out where they are, Lincoln kisses her and sends her back to take care of the others, claiming he could not forgive himself if something happened to her.

=== David "Whip" Martin ===
David Martin
- Prison Break character
- First appearance: "Kaniel Outis" (2017)
- Last appearance: "Behind the Eyes" (2017)
- Created by: Paul Scheuring
- Portrayed by: Augustus Prew

In-universe information
- Alias: Whip

David "Whip" Martin (played by Augustus Prew; season 5) is introduced as Michael's cellmate in Ogygia in season 5. He is quickly revealed to know that Michael is not Kaniel Outis, and that he and Michael have been breaking people out of prisons around the world for years. Michael repeatedly calls him his (Michael's) whip-hand, hence his nickname. He is loyal to Michael despite not knowing his real name, but as their time in Ogygia goes on and their escape plan doesn't seem to be working, he starts to become more paranoid that Michael will betray him, which only increases when Abu Ramal, the prisoner they are in Ogygia to break out, is released from solitary confinement. Michael repeatedly tells him he will not leave him, but he continues to be frightened, even fighting Michael and forcing a guard to break them up (though this is part of Michael's plan). He confronts Michael during the escape, where Michael finally reveals his plan to leave Ramal behind, satisfying Whip. However, the escape fails, and he, Michael, Ramal and their cellmate Ja are thrown into solitary confinement, where he starts to become paranoid once again as ISIL strikes land closer to the prison. After Michael convinces Ramal to help them escape, he and Ja are released from their cells when Michael gets the keys. They try to persuade Michael to leave Ramal behind, but Michael admits he is necessary. Eventually the four escape the prison along with Sid, another inmate, and formulate a plan to double-cross Ramal, but he turns the tables on them. Whip tells Ramal he was arrested for killing a man in a barfight, and when they are surprised by Lincoln, he takes the opportunity to kill Ramal, which ends up backfiring. With ISIL hunting them, he continues to follow Michael, now knowing his real name, despite two of their plans for escape failing. Eventually the group tries to escape across the desert to Phaecia, a small fishing village, and Whip kills several ISIL members following them. He accompanies Michael and Lincoln to Crete, Greece, and expresses his admiration for an injured Michael. He then accompanies them on to a freighter, arranged by Sucre, back to the States. When they are caught by NAVY Seals, he escapes with Michael, Lincoln and Sucre in a life raft, and is taken by fishing boat to France, from where Michael instead sends him to Chicago instead of New York. During this time, it is revealed that his real name is David Martin, and that he was a survivor in prison, which is why Michael chose him as his partner (and the cover story he told Ramal may have been why he was originally incarcerated). In Chicago, he follows coordinates given by Michael to Lake Michigan, where he meets T-Bag. T-Bag reveals that he is in fact his father, which is the reason why he Michael made him his whip-hand. During the final confrontation with Jacob Ness, aka Poseidon, he attacks him but is shot by A&W, and he dies in his father's arms. As a result, T-Bag kills A&W and goes back to Fox River prison, where he gets revenge for his son when Michael arranges Jacob to be T-Bag's cellmate.

== Characters affiliated with The Company ==
=== Jonathan Krantz ===
Jonathan Krantz
- Prison Break character
- First appearance: "The Killing Box" (2006)
- Last appearance: The Final Break (2009)
- Created by: Paul Scheuring
- Portrayed by: Leon Russom

In-universe information
- Nickname: Pad Man (by fans)
- Affiliation: The Company

Jonathan Krantz, or the "Pad Man" to fans (played by Leon Russom), is the main antagonist in the series. He is the leader of The Company and holds the rank of General. He appears only fleetingly in his first two seasons, as William Kim's shadowy superior and architect of Michael Scofield's incarceration at Sona. The character plays a large and important role in season 4, appearing in every episode although being credited as a guest star instead of being in the main credits. In earlier seasons, he is identified by his tendency to issue orders on notepads, to avoid being recorded, a tendency which he fully abandons by the fourth season. In his appearance in the fourth season premiere, he discovers that James Whistler, the man Michael was forced to break out of Sona, is a traitor. After Whistler's betrayal, he orders drastic measures to be taken against The Company's enemies, dispatching the ruthless assassin Wyatt to kill anyone and everyone necessary to achieve those ends. Meanwhile, in the initial stages of his season 4 character arc, the General is not aware of Michael's teams' efforts to steal Scylla and most early episodes of the season deals with him planning a sinister operation in Laos, and interacting mostly with Wyatt and the Scylla Cardholders. As the season unfolds, Michael and his team eventually learn of the General's identity and his place as the leader of The Company, and he gradually comes to the forefront of the plot with increased screen time with the protagonists as a consequence. When it is reported that Agent Don Self did an identity search on the General, he seems to be very shocked and gives Wyatt the order to keep an eye on Self. In "Safe and Sound", it is revealed to the viewers that the General's name is "Jonathan Krantz", as seen from the images of him. Learning that the General has one of the Scylla Cards, Michael's team plan an attack against his limo in "The Price". Due to the betrayal of team member Roland Glenn, the General is alerted and the attack is not successful.

Now knowing that Scylla is in danger, the General orders it to be moved and puts increasing pressure on Wyatt to kill the brothers. He is tricked in the next episode into thinking that Wyatt has killed the brothers, but decides to go ahead with moving Scylla anyway. He plays a large role in "Selfless", where he comes face to face with the Scylla team for the first time. When he goes to confront Michael in the underground bunker, he is forced to hand over his card by Michael's team at gunpoint. Thinking it is useless without the other cards, he's shocked when Michael unlocks Scylla with copies of the other five cards and takes him hostage. Under duress and the threat of his daughter Lisa's life, he allows the Scylla team to escape, only in the end realizing Michael has planned everything, including the getaway. In the following episodes, the General is put under immense pressure as he must direct efforts to retrieve Scylla while dealing with dissent amongst his own ranks. After learning in "Just Business" that Gretchen Morgan and Self has Scylla, he sends his men to retrieve it and eliminate all threats to The Company. His men fail, but capture Michael instead. Discovering that he is in an unstable condition, he is taken back to Company HQ. The General orders the doctors to look after Michael and keep him stable, and tells Lincoln that he can save Michael's life in exchange for the safe return of Scylla. The last third of the fourth season shows the General trying to use leverage to control and motivate Lincoln and his team in their pursuit of Scylla, while instructing his men to kill Michael, who escapes from Company security after the surgery.

The General has a somewhat reduced role in these final episodes, often having only a couple of scenes per episode. This is in part due to the introduction of a new prominent antagonist, Christina Rose Scofield (Michael and Lincoln's mother). A former employee of The Company, Christina turns rogue and acquires Scylla to set her own master plan in motion. This includes an assassination attempt against the General in "The Mother Lode" by one of the cardholders, who is working for Christina. For a while, the viewers are led to believe that the General dies in the explosion that destroys his limo, but he is later revealed to still be alive (if injured). As a consequence, the General grows increasingly desperate and paranoid, demanding the lives of all involved in the attempt on his life and the identity of the one holding Scylla. After he is informed that Christina is the buyer of Scylla, which Lincoln had neglected to tell him, the General travels to Miami with a number of henchmen to take charge himself. The General's screen time again increases somewhat in these final episodes, setting up for the eventual resolution of his character arc. Much of his screen time in these final episodes include him conspiring to get Scylla back, while also taking revenge on Christina, Michael and Lincoln. To this end, he takes Sara hostage in "Cowboys and Indians" and forces Michael to hand over Scylla. He promises to let them all go, which he actually has no intention of doing. Instead he states that he is planning a slow death for Michael and leaves Sara to be raped by T-Bag. In the last episode of the show, the General makes one last desperate attempt to get Scylla back, but is outwitted by Michael and the others and is left for the authorities. Michael then successfully releases Scylla to both the United States government and the United Nations. It is revealed in the series epilogue set four years after the events of the finale that Krantz was tried (possibly for treason and multiple counts of murder) and sentenced to death via the electric chair. In his final scene, the character is about to be executed. When asked if he is ready, he utters the last words "Semper Paratus". Krantz also appears briefly in The Final Break (a straight-to-DVD special set before the epilogue) where he is incarcerated at Miami Dade Prison and orders a hit on Sara in a last attempt to get revenge on Michael, but fails since Sara escapes successfully with the help of Gretchen who gets left behind.

=== William Kim ===
Bill Kim
- Prison Break character
- First appearance: "Map 1213" (2006)
- Last appearance: "Sona" (2007)
- Created by: Paul Scheuring; Karyn Usher
- Portrayed by: Reggie Lee

In-universe information
- Affiliation: The Company

William Kim (played by Reggie Lee) is a fairly high-ranking member of The Company who acts as an intermediary between the President and Paul Kellerman. He is introduced in the season 2 episode "Map 1213", and is the primary Company antagonist in the second season of the show. Kim becomes Kellerman's new supervisor shortly after the Fox River Eight escape. Kellerman is dismayed by this, as he has directly reported to Reynolds for 15 years, and the two characters have an antagonistic relationship throughout the first half of the season. Kim's character initially has a passive role, directing Kellerman's actions mainly through phone conversations. Throughout the season, Kim orders the deaths of all he perceives as a threat to the conspiracy, even including Governor Frank Tancredi, and orders Kellerman to murder Sara Tancredi as well. However, when Kellerman fails, Kim cuts him off, disavowing any records relating him to the President. In "The Killing Box", Kellerman calls Kim with a plan to eliminate the recently recaptured Lincoln and Michael. Kim agrees but then instructs an operative to kill Kellerman. This plot backfires when Kellerman betrays him.

Kim's role grows larger and more active in the season's later episodes. In the episode, "John Doe", Kim learns of Kellerman's betrayal, and fails to protect Terrence Steadman as Kellerman and the brothers get their hands on him. As Kellerman has now switched sides, Kim increasingly appears in scenes with Alexander Mahone, the leader of the FBI manhunt who is secretly under blackmail from The Company. Kim puts pressure on him to murder the fugitives. Kim also attempts to manipulate Kellerman by using a female operative and voice-alteration equipment to give him the appearance that President Reynolds is willing to make amends, though Kellerman eventually sees through this ploy. As the character's role grows bigger, he becomes the primary antagonist of the brothers in season 2, and Kim begins to share screen time with them, most notably in "Sweet Caroline" where he violently attacks Michael in an attempt to make him reveal Lincoln's whereabouts. After the brothers escape to Panama, Kim is ordered by his superior, a mysterious man known in season 2 only as "Pad Man", to kill Lincoln and frame Michael for it, thus ensuring Michael's incarceration at the prison called Sona. Although he hates being in the field, Kim personally travels to Panama in the season finale to complete The Company's plan. In the character's final appearance, he is shot and killed by Sara Tancredi just before he is about to kill Lincoln.

=== Caroline Reynolds ===
Caroline Reynolds
- Prison Break character
- First appearance: "Allen" (2005)
- Last appearance: "Sweet Caroline" (2007)
- Created by: Paul Scheuring
- Portrayed by: Patricia Wettig

In-universe information
- Title(s): Vice President of the United States, later President
- Occupation: Politician
- Affiliation: The Company

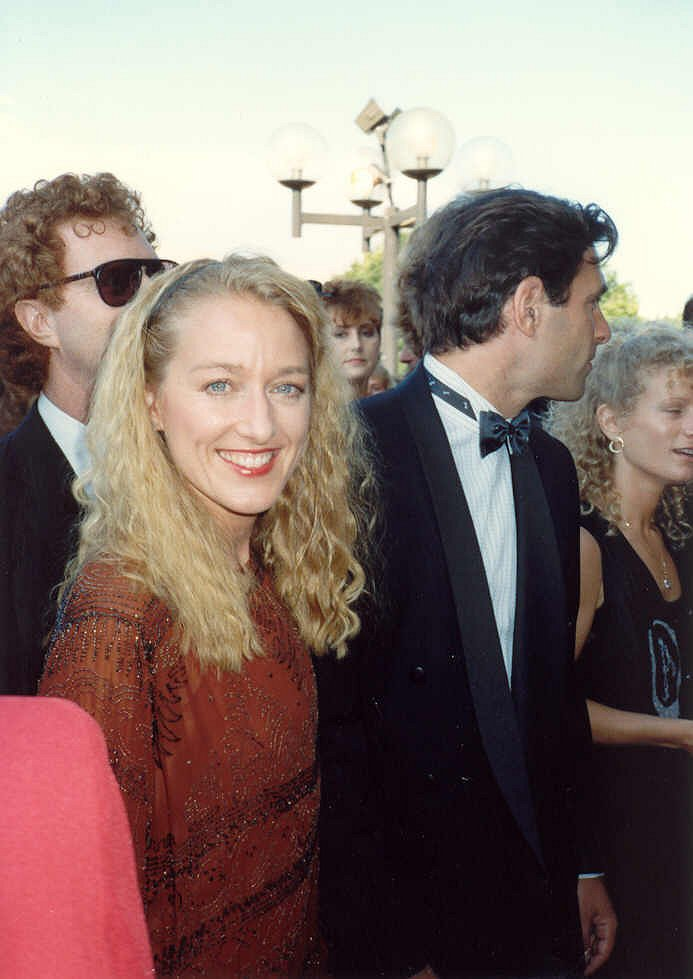
Patricia Wettig

Caroline Reynolds (played by Patricia Wettig) is a recurring character introduced in the second episode of the series, and is eventually revealed to be the Vice President of the United States. She is affiliated with The Company, and is portrayed as an ambitious politician who seeks to secure the presidency through any means necessary, including murder. She was the main antagonist for the first season. Reynolds is at the center of the show's conspiracy plot in the first season, having framed Lincoln Burrows for her brother Terrence Steadman's faked death. She goes to great lengths to preserve this conspiracy. The character initially appears only sporadically, ordering her agents to kill anyone who interferes, and later announces her candidacy for President. Her role eventually grows larger, focusing on her dealings with The Company, and her allegiance with her henchman Paul Kellerman. It is shown in the episodes "Brother's Keeper" and "Go" that Kellerman is very affectionate and loyal to her, having served her for 15 years, though she does not share the extent of his feelings, instead using them to turn Kellerman into her devoted lackey. In "The Key", her popularity in the polls begins to decrease and The Company decides to abandon her in "Go". However, after Reynolds secretly poisons and kills the President in the season finale, she is sworn in as the 46th President of the United States.

In season 2, due to Patricia Wettig getting a role on Brothers & Sisters, Reynolds is largely absent. She is often mentioned, but her only real appearance is in "Sweet Caroline", for which Wettig was credited as a "Special Guest Star". Michael Scofield allows himself to be captured and blackmails her for a presidential pardon with a tape that implicates her in the conspiracy, and also strongly suggests that she and Steadman were incestuous lovers. She caves, but is then threatened by The Company, and instead announces she has a malignant form of cancer, forcing her to resign the presidency. Later it is assumed that Reynolds was arrested after Kellerman revealed what she did at Sara's trial.

Production details

At the campaign rally in "Sweet Caroline", banners can be seen promoting Reynolds's campaign website, Reynolds-Again.com. The website is an easter egg, like Europeangoldfinch.net, and was once online in the real world. The website reveals that Reynolds has previously served as a US Senator and as a member of the Illinois State Board of Education. While Reynolds' political party is never stated, she is likely a member of the Democratic Party, as a news broadcast focused on her includes a pivot from her side to the Republican side.

=== Christina Rose Scofield ===
Christina Rose Scofield
- Prison Break character
- First appearance: "The Sunshine State" (2008)
- Last appearance: The Final Break (2009)
- Created by: Paul Scheuring; Matt Olmstead, Nicholas Wootton
- Portrayed by: Kathleen Quinlan

In-universe information
- Aliases: Christina Hampton; Christina Burrows
- Affiliation: The Company (anti-)

Christina Rose Scofield (portrayed by Kathleen Quinlan) is the mother of Michael Scofield and Lincoln Burrows. She is first referred-to in the episode "English, Fitz or Percy" (the first season; a flashback sequence to the childhood of brothers-as-protagonists). It is revealed that she died young of liver cancer. She is occasionally mentioned throughout the first and second seasons, such as in "Tweener" where Michael credits her with giving him his sense of right and wrong. She is mentioned again near the end of season 2 in the episode "Panama"; her name is revealed to be Christina Rose Scofield when Michael names his boat after her. In the early episodes of season 4, her cause of death is retconned to a brain tumor. In "The Sunshine State", she is revealed to be alive, living under the alias Christina Hampton, and working for The Company, though her exact position is unknown. The character makes her first onscreen appearance at the end of that episode and features as a prominent antagonist for the final six episodes of the show. As Scylla is stolen from Company headquarters in L.A., Christina betrays The Company and its leader General Jonathan Krantz by having one of her men secure it. Her appearances in "The Mother Lode" and "VS" are devoted towards setting the stage for her grand master plan, as she meets with the son of the Prime Minister of India to offer him Scylla technology. She also has her first scene with Lincoln, in which she attempts to convince him that she is seeking to reform The Company from within. Christina's character is portrayed as letting nothing stand in her way, which is shown when she later instructs one of her men to kill Lincoln when he interferes with her plan.

In "SOB" Christina is captured by Michael and his girlfriend Sara Tancredi in an effort to make her divulge Scylla's location. The character is often shown to share the same brilliant mind as her son Michael, which is evident when she manipulates him by claiming that Lincoln is adopted (the writer of the episode, Karyn Uscher, reveals on the episode audio commentary that this is a lie). Nevertheless, this puts Michael off balance and he leaves to try and save Lincoln, leaving Sara alone with Christina. She subsequently escapes. At the end of the episode, the real nature of her plan is revealed to be the assassination of the Prime Minister's son and shifting blame onto the Chinese, thereby provoking a war between India and China that she will profit from by selling Scylla weaponry data to both sides. However, Michael and Lincoln steal Scylla from her in "Cowboys and Indians", and she resorts to taking Lincoln hostage to try and force Michael to return Scylla to her. She also shoots him in the lung to give Michael extra incentive. Despite this, her character begins to unravel in the next episode when she is unsuccessful in getting Scylla back in time to profit from the technology. Michael finally outwits her when he sends Alexander Mahone with a fake Scylla containing a bomb. She survives the explosion in the series finale, however, and continues her pursuit of Scylla. In her final appearance, she attempts to kill Michael when he refuses to let her leave with Scylla, but is instead shot to death by Sara after a desperate Michael fails to kill her with his misfiring pistol. Her death at Sara's hands becomes the set-up for The Final Break.

=== Other conspiracy characters ===
Season 1

- Samantha Brinker (played by Michelle Forbes) is a member of The Company. She is introduced midway through the first season as an intermediary to Vice President Caroline Reynolds. She is shown to be openly condescending towards Reynolds, viewing her as merely a pawn to achieve Company interests, and is privy to The Company's true intentions behind the framing of Lincoln Burrows. Later, Brinker delights in humiliating Reynolds by informing her of The Company's decision to withdraw support to her campaign, only to have Reynolds turn the tables by secretly murdering the president. Her character only appeared in season 1.
- Aldo Burrows (played by Anthony Denison) is the father of Lincoln Burrows and Michael Scofield. In the early episodes of Season 1, he is offhandedly said by several characters to be a drunk who abandoned his family. He makes his first appearance in "By the Skin and the Teeth"; and his true background is revealed in "The Key". He tells Lincoln that he left to take a position with The Company as a data analyst, but he was in fact an executioner tasked with killing anyone who defected from The Company. Because of his commitments, he was forced to abandon his family when Lincoln was still a child and before Michael was born. The character is central to the plot, as he is the catalyst that set everything in motion. After leaving The Company and trying to expose them, Lincoln was framed for murder to draw Aldo out. Aldo returns for three episodes in season 2, arranging to have Lincoln and his son L. J. saved from the police, and reunites with Michael. Aldo's character is killed off in "Disconnect" when he is shot by Agent Alexander Mahone. His death prompts the protagonists to stay and fight against The Company. He continues to be mentioned occasionally in later seasons.
- Daniel Hale (played by Danny McCarthy) is a U.S. Secret Service Agent and old friend of Kellerman. Hale first appears in the pilot episode as Kellerman's nervous partner and a member of the Burrows conspiracy. The character appears with a minor role in the first 13 episodes. Hale is portrayed as less cold-blooded than Kellerman; and, while initially loyal to his cause, he grows increasingly disillusioned at the number of innocents killed. He later has a crisis of conscience. In "Odd Man Out", he offers to help Veronica reveal the conspiracy. In the next episode, he is confronted by Kellerman; upon discovering that Hale planned to name him in the conspiracy, Kellerman is visibly upset and promptly kills him.
- Quinn (played by Michael Gaston) is an agent from The Company. Put in charge of supervising Agents Kellerman and Hale, Quinn appears for a two-episode plotline. The character serves as an introduction to the Company story arc of the show. When he is first introduced he appears mild-mannered, friendly and somewhat bumbling, but is revealed to actually be observant, very intelligent, and ruthless. After he suspends Kellerman and Hale from duty, Quinn murders Veronica Donovan's ex-fiancé in order to track her down. He ends up capturing Nick Savrinn, Veronica and L. J. at their cabin in New Glarus. Quinn has a big part in the next episode, where he interrogates Veronica and a wounded Nick for information. His attempts fail when Veronica manages to escape. Quinn gives chase, but is pushed into the bottom of a well by L. J. Quinn is forced to call Kellerman and Hale for help at the end of the episode, though Kellerman merely pulls a cover over the well, leaving him there to die, threatening Hale to go along with it. This is retaliation as Quinn cracked Kellerman's finger, when he protested their suspension causing severe pain to him. It is shown in a later episode that Quinn scratches the names KELLERMAN and O. KRAVECKI into the wall before dying of thirst and starvation.

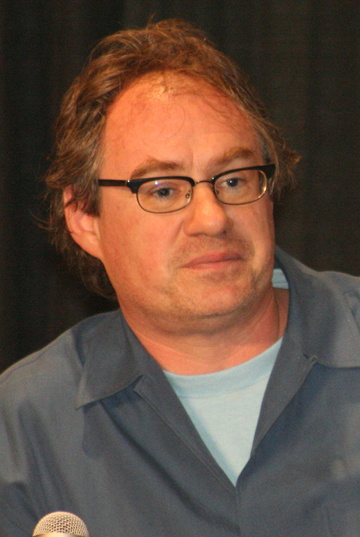
John Billingsley played Terrence Steadman in the first season.

- Terrence Steadman (played first by John Billingsley, then by Jeff Perry, decoy body played by David Lively) is Caroline Reynolds's brother, and at the center of the conspiracy framing Lincoln Burrows for his faked murder. Assumed dead, he is later shown to be alive and hiding in a house in Montana. Veronica later learns that he is alive and attempts to confront him, but is killed by Company agents. In season 2, the character is recast with Perry, as Billingsley left for The Nine. In "John Doe", he is kidnapped by Lincoln, Kellerman and Michael in an effort to bring down The Company. When Scofield and the others get a hold of a recorded conversation between him and Caroline implicating an incestuous relationship between the two, Steadman shoots himself in the head. He reappears briefly in a flashback in "Sweet Caroline".
- Tangrin (played by Jacqueline Williams) initially appears as a reporter to interview Lincoln at Fox River. She later reveals herself to be a conspiracy operative, when she threatens Lincoln, telling him that it is up to him whether L. J. lives or dies.

Season 2

- Jane Phillips (played by Kristin Lehman) is a close ally of Aldo Burrows that appears for two episodes in season 2. She helps rescue Lincoln and L. J. Burrows from the police and is then sent away to take care of L. J. She was probably killed after L. J. is kidnapped in season 3.
- Elliott Pike (played by John S. Davies) appears as a Company agent in the season 2 finale. In season 3, he is shown to be working for Gretchen to get Whistler out of Sona. He monitors Lincoln Burrows, and is later told to kill him. Pike fails and is shot and killed by Lincoln.
- Agent Blondie (played by Steven Chester Prince) is a Company agent in season 2. He kills Veronica in "Manhunt" and returns in "Dead Fall", trying to kill Sara. In his final appearance he arranges the hit-and-run accident of Agent Mahone's son, and is killed by Mahone as seen with bullets in his forehead in the boot of Mahone's car.

Season 4

- Ralph Becker (portrayed by Raphael Sbarge) first appears at the home of Gretchen's sister in "Just Business". He is captured by T-Bag, who spends the episode wondering if he is a bible salesman or with The Company. He is later revealed to be a Company agent. The character returns in "VS" and appears in the final episodes. He is killed off in the series finale.
- Downey (portrayed by Ted King) is Christina Scofield's right-hand man. He is introduced at the end of "The Sunshine State" and appears in every episode thereafter. The character's role is relatively small and he usually appears in scenes with Christina. He is portrayed as being very loyal to her and helps her to frame Lincoln for murder at the energy conference in the episode "SOB". Downey is killed in the series finale when a fake Scylla, containing a bomb devised by Michael, is detonated.
- Nathaniel Edison (played by John Sanderford) is a Scylla Cardholder appearing in 2 episodes.
- Ferguson (played by Graham McTavish) is first seen as a bodyguard for Krantz, and guarded a jailed Michael.
- Dr. Roger Knowlton (played by John Getz) is a Company psychiatrist. After Michael collapses in the street due to his tumor and is taken by the Company, the doctor, holding Michael captive in the woods, tells him his mother is alive and attempts to persuade him to join his mother in working for the Company.
- Jason Lief (played by John Rosenfeld) is a businessman who gained possession of one of the Scylla cards which the Company requires James Whistler to recover. Michael finds his schedule in the season 3 finale. In "Scylla", Whistler contacts him and gets the card back, by paying $50 million, afterwards killing him and his bodyguard, the only witness, to tie up loose ends.
- Wyatt Mathewson (played by Cress Williams) is a top level Company assassin introduced in the season 4 premiere episode, hunting for the "A-Team" under orders from General Krantz. Wyatt's character has a big role and plays a critical function to the plot of the early episodes in the fourth season, but is killed off after 9 episodes. He is a "hired contractor" by his own words to a startled Don Self when Krantz sent Wyatt to investigate why Self was pulling information on the General. Wyatt is portrayed as an emotionless killer, performing swift executions without remorse, which is shown when he kills James Whistler, Bruce Bennett, Cameron Mahone, and Jasper Potts, in his pursuit of the protagonists. He is highly effective in tracking, and has a working knowledge of truth serums. Having killed Alex Mahone's son to draw him out, a major plotline of these episodes include Mahone seeking revenge, most notably in "Blow Out" where they share screen time for the first time. Wyatt ultimately comes face to face with the A-Team in "The Price" when he tortures and kills Roland Glenn for information on their whereabouts. After shooting Roland in the stomach, he is ambushed and captured by the team. Wyatt spends his last episode, "Greatness Achieved" as a prisoner. After the rest of the team get what they need from Wyatt, Mahone tortures him and makes him apologize to his wife for the murder of their son, via cell phone. In his last scene, Wyatt is chained to a cinder block by Mahone and pushed off a pier, drowning the killer.
- Griffin Oren (played by Shaun Duke) appears as a Scylla Cardholder and a member of the US Treasury Department in "Safe and Sound". He reappears in "The Mother Lode", working for Christina Scofield to assassinate the General. When Oren fails, Christina has him killed.
- Jasper Potts (played by Troy Ruptash) was Don Self's informant, and killed by Wyatt.
- Vincent Sandinsky (played by Ivar Brogger) is a Company scientist, working with Christina, whose death was ordered by Christina after failing to kill the General.
- Howard Scuderi (played by Jude Ciccolella) is a Scylla Cardholder with an important role in "Five the Hard Way". He makes two additional but minor appearances, but is then written out when he is shot and killed by the General for questioning his decision to move Scylla.
- Lisa Tabak (played by Stacy Haiduk) is the chief logistician in SENSA and a high-ranking member of The Company. She is later revealed to also be a daughter of General Krantz. She first appears in "Eagles and Angels" as the wife of Erol Tabak, the Turkish consul and a Scylla Cardholder. She reappears in "The Price", and becomes a recurring character in the following episodes. She is in charge of arranging the transfer of Scylla and appears mainly in scenes with The General. Lisa's character plays a critical role in "Selfless", where she is taken hostage by Sara Tancredi to enable Michael Scofield and his team to steal Scylla. She is then released. Lisa resigns in the next episode after witnessing her father murdering his advisor, and in "The Sunshine State" she helps Sara to rescue Michael from The Company.
- Michelle Taylor (played by Julie Berzon) was one of the Company agents guarding Sara and L. J. during season 3. She helped Sara escape, and Gretchen executed her for doing this. Sara promises revenge for her death. She only appears in a flashback in "The Price".
- Stuart Tuxhorn (played by Steve Tom) is a Scylla cardholder that appears mostly in the early parts of season 4. He is killed in "VS" for possibly withholding information.
- Krantz's Aide (played by Dan Sachoff) is the aide of General Jonathan Krantz and a Company agent.

== Fox River characters ==
=== Prisoners ===
- David "Tweener" Apolskis (played by Lane Garrison) first appears in ninth episode of the first season as a prisoner of Fox River. It is later revealed that he was arrested after swiping a T206 Honus Wagner Baseball card and is charged with grand larceny. T-Bag gives him the nickname "Tweener" due to his affinity for African American culture, and harasses him until Michael Scofield intervenes. Tweener returns in "And Then There Were 7", doing a favor for Michael. In later episodes, however, Tweener becomes an obstacle to Michael and the rest of the escape team after he is coerced by Brad Bellick to become an informant. In "J-Cat", he fails to give good information and is put in a cell with a large man called "Avocado" who sexually abuses him. A desperate Tweener slashes his penis with a razorblade. Knowing that Avocado will soon recover, Michael takes pity on Tweener and tells him of the escape. Tweener in turn tells Bellick, and the plan is nearly derailed. Knowing of his betrayal, Michael forces Tweener to go his own way in the season finale. In season 2, Tweener initially has a separate subplot. After getting to St. Louis, he appears in "Otis" and hitches a ride to Utah with a college girl named Debra Jean Belle (Kristin Malko), a girl who wants to travel to Hawaii. The two become intimate in "First Down", but she learns of his fugitive status in the next episode. The two characters go separate ways, though she allows him to steal her car, reporting it stolen later. When he leaves the car, he writes "Aloha" on it. In the same episode, Tweener re-unites with the other main characters and helps them dig for Westmoreland's $5 million before he is captured by FBI Agent Mahone in "Subdivision". In his final appearance on the show in "Buried", Tweener denies a transfer to a better prison and refuses to give away Scofield's location, instead misleading the police. He tells the police that he is going to take them to Scofield's location, but instead, he visits Debra for the last time to tell her that he loves her and he wishes she could know Hawaii in the future. In his last scene, Mahone takes Tweener to a side road and guns him down in cold blood, planting a gun on him to give the appearance of a struggle. Tweener is the second member of the Fox River Eight to be taken down by the authorities.
- Charles Westmoreland (played by Muse Watson) is one of the key supporting characters in the first season. He is introduced as Fox River's longest-serving inmate (thirty-two years) and he tells Scofield that he has sixty more years left on his sentence. An important plot function of Westmoreland is that he is believed to be the airline hijacker D. B. Cooper, which he repeatedly denied. In the first half of the season, he is often shown with a tabby cat named Marilyn that he gets to keep due to a grandfather clause in the prison's policy. Portrayed as mild-mannered and quiet, he tries to stay out of other people's business. Westmoreland plays an important role in "The Old Head", in which Captain Bellick murders Marilyn after Westmoreland refuses to help him identify the convict who killed a guard in the previous episode. Westmoreland retaliates by starting a fire in the guards' break room, making it seem like Bellick's negligence caused the fire. He is again prominent in the plot in "And Then There Were 7", when his character motivation changes and he wants to escape in order to visit his terminally-ill daughter. In the episode, he confirms that he was indeed D. B. Cooper. Following this, Westmoreland joins Michael Scofield's escape team and participates in the first failed escape attempt in "End of the Tunnel". Westmoreland has a more minor role in most late season 1 episodes, but appears prominently in "Bluff". In addition, a subplot sees him building a bond with fellow escapee C-Note who also joined the escape to be with his daughter. Westmoreland is later fatally wounded while subduing Bellick when he discovers the escape hole in the guards' room. During the escape, he collapses from blood loss, telling Michael to go on without him and making him promise to visit his daughter and revealing the location of the $5 million D. B. Cooper money. He is found dead by Warden Pope in the season finale. Westmoreland reappears, along with Marilyn, in season 4, in a dream sequence in Michael's head, helping him discover Scylla's true nature.

Haywire in Season 1

- Charles "Haywire" Patoshik (played by Silas Weir Mitchell) is a prisoner at Fox River's Psych Ward. He is serving a 60-year sentence, for killing his parents. He has schizoaffective disorder with bipolar tendencies, and a fear of crowds. He is temporarily Michael's cellmate, becoming obsessed with his tattoos and recognizing a pathway. Michael fakes an assault and gets him sent back to the psych ward. 13 episodes later, Michael seeks Haywire's help to remember a part of the tattoo. Michael is forced to include him in the escape after he finds out about the plan, but soon abandons him. Haywire then escapes on his own on a stolen bicycle. In season 2, he is mostly used as comic relief. His plot line focuses on him building a raft to go to Holland. Haywire is later trapped by police up a silo and convinced by Mahone to commit suicide by jumping to his death. He is the third member of the Fox River Eight to be taken down by the authorities. In a third-season episode, he reappears as a hallucination to Mahone several times.
- Manche Sanchez (played by Joe Nunez) is Sucre's cousin, and is incarcerated at the same prison. Manche works in the laundry and becomes invaluable to the escape team when they have to reformulate their escape-plan; Sucre makes Manche a member of the team after he helps them frame C.O. Geary. Manche is captured on the night of the escape after his weight causes the cable wire used to climb over the wall to break. He later agrees to reveal Sucre's whereabouts in exchange for a transfer to a minimum security prison.
- Gus Fiorello (played by Peter J. Reineman) is Abruzzi's right-hand man at Fox River. Falzone later promotes him, prompting Abruzzi to take revenge by grinding a broken light bulb into Gus' eye. When Abruzzi's prison status is restored, he turns Gus into an outcast.
- "Avocado" Balz-Johnson (played by Daniel Allar) is an inmate who is assigned as Tweener's cellmate and repeatedly rapes and abuses him until Tweener takes revenge by slicing his penis with a razor blade. After Bellick himself is imprisoned in season 2, Avocado becomes his cellmate.
- Seth "Cherry" Hoffner (played by Blaine Hogan) is a young inmate who shares a cell with T-Bag. He pleads with Michael to help him, before hanging himself over the rail of the first tier in A wing leaving Michael feeling guilty. He uses the escape tunnel as leverage to warn T-Bag not to abuse other prisoners. His name is possibly based on that of Seth Hoffman, one of the writers for the series.
- Christopher Trokey (played by Robert Michael Vieau) is an inmate who was a friend of T-Bags until T-Bag asked Seth Hoffner to report Trokey as the person who murdered C.O. Robert "Bob" Hudson. T-Bag hid a picture of C.O. Bob's daughter that he took from his wallet under Trokey's bed and when the guards found it they took him to the SHU.
- Trumpets (played by Anthony Fleming) is C-Note's right-hand man in his black gang in Fox River. He wears a white Do Rag, Bad blood arises between him and C-Note when the latter joins the PI crew, leadership of the gang goes to Trumpets who banishes him and after a violent fight which C-Note initiated, after a beat down by his former gang, Trumpets issues a death mark on his head. He is unsuccessful in finding him. In season 2, when Bellick is incarcerated and beaten by the inmates, Trumpets coldly tells him to expect more attacks.
- Trumpets' right-hand man (played by David Dino Wells Jr) is Trumpets' cellmate and friend.
- Jason "Maytag" Buchanon (played by Brian Hamman) was T-Bag's cellmate until he was killed in the race riots by a black inmate who stabbed him several times with a blunt screw.
- Banks (played by Lester "Rasta" Speight) is the leader of another black gang at Fox River consisting of himself and four others. When Bellick is incarcerated at Fox River, he demands Bellick's dessert in exchange for protecting him from other inmates. However, when Bellick gives him the dessert, he demands four more for his friends. Bellick then beats him with a sock full of batteries. He and his gang later take revenge by beating up Bellick at night.
- Bank's right-hand man (played by Marcus M. Mauldin) is Banks friend during season 2 at Fox River Penitentiary.
- Turk (played by John Turk) is an inmate with an arm bracelet hired by Kellerman to kill Lincoln. During "Riots, Drills and the Devil" he leads Lincoln to an out-of-the-way area under the impression that he is taking him to his brother, and tries to kill him. Lincoln, however, manages to throw Turk off a ledge, Turk lands hard on his back, and dies from his injuries shortly afterward.
- "Stroker" Kuame (played by Kwame Amoaku) is an inmate who was in the sickbay at the time of the riot in "Riots, Drills and the Devil". When the inmates in the sickbay hear of the riot, he leads them in starting their own riot. They capture Rizzo Green and attempt to rape Sara Tancredi, but she makes it into the office. Stroker breaks part of the glass and tries to get her, but she is rescued by Michael. They follow them, and eventually he finds them. He fights Michael to try to get to Sara, but is beaten. He and others continue to follow them until they reach the exit. After Sara escapes, a sniper fires at Michael. Michael ducks, and Stroker, who was behind him, is hit in the chest and is never mentioned in the series following the shooting. His real name is Kuame, as mentioned by Sara.
- Theo (played by Brad Fleischer) was in the sickbay at the time of "Riots, Drills and the Devil". He is mentioned to have a recently fixed knee, held in place by nuts and bolts. He joins them in their own riot. He follows Stroker and others as they go after Michael and Sara. He at one point opens a tile in the ceiling and climbs through, but is kicked back down by Michael. When Stroker finds Michael and Sara and attacks Michael, he moves to help. However, Sara kicks him in his recently repaired knee, breaking it, and then kicks him away.
- Annie the Tranny (played by Kirk Anderson) is a transvestite inmate at Fox River. T-Bag finds him unattractive. When Sucre needs to fill in a hole in the guards' break room, which will most likely result in him being caught outside, he forces T-Bag to offer Annie a sexual favor to get his panties, to give him an excuse as to why he was outside. T-Bag is reluctant, but does so.
- Jesus (played by Jose Antonio Garcia) is an inmate in the kitchen who runs a poker game for inmates to earn money, which he participates in. T-Bag and C-Note enter it to earn money to buy Michael's cell, and win due to T-Bag cheating and C-Note bluffing. Jesus grudgingly admits defeat, but warns C-Note to stay away from him in the yard.
- Zach (played by Ellis Foster) is an older inmate at Fox River who participates in the poker game run by Jesus. He is called "Wrinkles" by C-Note. He seems happy when Jesus is beaten, but also forces C-Note to give up a card which lands face up.
- Pao (played by Roddy Chiong) is an inmate at Fox River who participates in the poker game run by Jesus. He is called "Ping-Pong" by C-Note. He at one point asks C-Note if the "horseshoe up your ass" hurts, showing he does not realize T-Bag and C-Note are working together to win the game.
- Wholesale (played by Malieek Straughter) is an inmate at Fox River Penitentiary who is Sucre's friend who was with Michael. They briefly chatted and seems to be a useful tool for Michael's escape plan.

=== Staff ===
==== Wardens ====
- Warden Henry Pope (played by Stacy Keach) is the dedicated warden of Fox River State Penitentiary. The character plays a major role throughout the first season, primarily playing the role of a father figure of sorts to the protagonist, Michael Scofield. Pope's character is portrayed as someone who believes in rehabilitation for the prisoners to make them productive members of society by organizing the prison industry (PI) and educational programs that allows inmates to receive their GED and even bachelor's degrees. On the audio commentary for the pilot episode, creator Paul Scheuring talks about how most TV and movie wardens are portrayed as corrupt, and that the purpose of Pope was to create a warden that was actually one of the good guys. In the pilot, it is revealed that he has been married to Judith for 39 years. However, a later episode shows that, years earlier while in Toledo, Pope had an affair and fathered a child, Will Clayton, who later had run-ins with the law and died at 18. Pope confessed to his wife about the affair, but did not tell her about Will. For his 40th wedding anniversary, Pope wants to give his wife a replica of the Taj Mahal. However, he constructs it poorly and has enlisted the help of Michael to make sure the structure is stable. Michael uses this time to help further his escape plan. Pope plays a central role in the episode "English, Fitz or Percy", where Secret Service Agents Paul Kellerman and Daniel Hale attempt to use the information about Pope's illegitimate child to blackmail him into allowing Michael to be transferred to another prison. Pope initially gives in to their demands, but later changes his mind and refuses the transfer and goes home to tell his wife about Will. His wife does not re-appear, but she presumably forgives him as Michael continues working on the Taj Mahal replica.

Michael's affiliation with Pope soon angers Captain Brad Bellick. While Pope shown to be an honest man, Bellick is a definite villain in the first season of the series, shown to be known for both taking bribes and inmate abuse. Pope does not know the extent of Bellick's corruption and even intends him as his heir after he would retire. It is revealed in the episode "Riots, Drills and the Devil (Part 2)" that Bellick secretly looks down on Pope, viewing him as a softy who is not hard enough on the inmates. But after Pope catches Bellick bad-mouthing him to Governor Frank Tancredi later in the same episode, he harshly reprimands him, frightening Bellick. Pope is not featured as heavily in the middle parts of the season, where he is used mainly to deliver bad news to various characters. However, Pope returns to prominence in the plot in later episodes, and his relationship with Michael continues to be explored. Pope and Michael's respect and trust between each other increases as Michael regularly visits Pope to help him with his Taj Mahal project. Their relationship is temporarily strained when Michael refuses to name the guard that apparently assaulted him, but the conflict is later resolved. Pope trusts Michael, often leaving him unattended in his office, and once even going as far as saying he feels fortunate that the two have met. On the night of the escape, in the episodes "Tonight" and "Go", Warden Pope is forced to release Lincoln Burrows from solitary by Michael while holding a shank against him, after which Michael ties Pope to a chair and knocks him unconscious. Pope is shocked and feels betrayed by Michael. After he is found by the guards in the season 1 finale "Flight", Pope immediately contacts the police and the governor upon the escape, and, along with Bellick, directs an extensive but ultimately fruitless manhunt against the fugitives.

In season 2, with the plot moving away from the prison, Pope is quickly written out of the show. He resigns in protest in the second episode, when the DOC decides to fire Bellick. After a 15-episode absence, Pope returns for a one-episode guest appearance in "Bad Blood", playing a vital role when Michael asks for his help to retrieve evidence that could exonerate Lincoln. Pope reluctantly agrees, but asks in return that Michael turns himself in. After he retrieves the evidence, though, he tells Michael he does not need to turn himself in. The two then part ways, on at least somewhat good terms. This is Pope's last appearance.

- Warden Ed Pavelka (played by Brandon Smith) took over as Warden at the prison after Pope quit after the Fox River Eight escaped. He was a much tougher Warden than Pope and refused to let Bellick stay in Ad-Seg even after he was attacked.

==== Guards ====
- Roy Geary (played by Matt DeCaro) was a correctional officer at Fox River. He is known for corruption and inmate abuse. After Michael is sent to the psych ward and Sucre is sent to the SHU, Geary auctions off their cell. Not wanting the escape plan exposed, C-Note offers $500 for the cell. Geary later demands $700, but when C-Note turns over the amount, Geary keeps the cash and smugly tells him that the cell has already been sold. In retaliation, the escape team frames him for burning Michael; Pope searches Geary's locker, finding a burnt guard uniform that appears to corroborate Michael's story. Geary is immediately fired. Geary returns in season 2, testifying against Brad Bellick, resulting in Bellick being fired. The two soon decides to work together as bounty hunters. They capture and torture T-Bag to make him reveal the location of Westmoreland's money. But upon finding it, Geary betrays Bellick and steals the cash. He is later killed by T-Bag, who uses a tracking device to find Geary.
- Louis Patterson (played by Phillip Edward Van Lear) is a correctional officer at Fox River, and is usually seen with C.O. Stolte. Initially a minor character, his screen time increases somewhat in later episodes. Patterson is more compassionate than most COs, particularly to Lincoln Burrows. Patterson even allows Lincoln to see his son without handcuffs in one episode. He is married, but has an affair with the Warden's secretary Becky. Patterson has the habit of referring to the inmates as "ladies" or other names with female associations. When the Fox River Eight escapes from the prison, Patterson joins Bellick and other correctional officers in pursuit of the convicts. He remains at Fox River in season 2, and re-appears when Bellick returns to the prison as an inmate.
- Keith Stolte (played by Christian Stolte) is a correctional officer at Fox River. He likes to talk about sports with C.O. Patterson and has a teen aged son called Josh. His role is at first very small, but increases significantly towards the end of the season. Stolte is a harsh guard, but shows compassion in helping Lincoln prepare for the impending execution, and has a good relationship with Lincoln throughout the first season. Stolte becomes suspicious when Bellick does not show up to work on the day of the escape, and convinces Patterson to inform Warden Pope. Following the Fox River Eight escape, Stolte remains at the prison reporting to Pope. He also advises Pope to contact the Governor. Stolte re-appears briefly in season 2, when Bellick becomes incarcerated at Fox River.
- Rizzo Green (played by Mark Morettini) is a correctional officer at Fox River. He is usually stationed in the medical wing where he has been knocked unconscious twice, once during the riot set of by Michael Scofield and then again on the night of the escape by T-Bag.
- Mack Andrews (played by Mac Brandt) is a correctional officer at Fox River. He has been drunk on the job at least once. He is seen having a sly drink in the corridors when Michael is on his way back from the psych ward. Michael burns his back leaning on a pipe, while trying to avoid being caught by Mack. Mack joins the efforts to recapture the Fox River Eight.
- JJ (played by Javon Johnson) is a correctional officer at Fox River. He usually works alongside C.O Coco on gardening detail during Prison Industries and patrolling the outside of the Prison. Once he saw C-Note's old crew waiting for C-Note and the other escapees outside on patrol but did not know who they were and believed their story about breaking down.
- Coco (played by Lea Coco) is a correctional officer at Fox River. He usually works alongside C.O. JJ on gardening detail during Prison Industries and patrolling the outside of the Prison. Once he saw C-Note's old crew waiting for C-Note and the other escapees outside on patrol but did not know who they were and believed their story about breaking down.
- Tyler Robert "Bob" Hudson (played by Michael Cudlitz) was a correctional officer at Fox River he usually was seen at the death row section with Buttorws. During the riot set of by T-Bag he is taken hostage and used as leverage in negotiation. He learns of tunnel being dug to escape, he is set free until he was killed by T-Bag to prevent the discovery of the hole at the back of Michael Scofield's cell.

=== Other Fox River characters ===
- Becky Gerber (played by Jennifer Joan Taylor) is Warden Henry Pope's secretary. She has an illicit affair with corrections officer Louis Patterson.
- Reverend Mailor (played by Tom McElroy) is the Prison Chaplain. He helps Lincoln through his ordeal of dying in the electric chair, and gives guidance to Abruzzi when he sees the image of Jesus Christ on his Prison Cell wall.
- Katie Welch (played by DuShon Monique Brown) is a nurse and friend of Sara Tancredi. She is shown to be the only person who Sara interacts with regularly inside and outside the prison. After the Fox River Eight escape, Katie reluctantly tells the warden that Sara may have aided Michael in his escape. In the second season, Katie visits Sara at the hospital. She returns in the fifteenth episode when Bellick is incarcerated at Fox River and is sent to the infirmary after he was beaten by other inmates. He tries to charm her, but fails.
- Kenny Sklar (played by Andrew Rothenberg) is an orderly in the psych ward at Fox River. He operates the door. He first appears in the episode "By The Skin and the Teeth" when Michael, posing as a guard, enters asking to use the bathroom, and lets him in, nearly discovering him going into the pipes beneath. He reveals that he believes it is better to work in the psych ward than in general population, due to having only one way to deal with inmates acting up in psych ward. His second appearance is in "Go" where Michael, posing as a guard again brings the rest of the escaping inmates through the psych ward to escape. Sklar realizes that the uniform Tweener is wearing is not from the psych ward, due to having blue stains, and also recognizes Abruzzi. He also seems to recognize Michael, though as the guard who came in to use the bathroom rather than as an inmate who has been in the psych ward before. Michael asks for some sedative to put Abruzzi down. When he hands it over, Michael injects Sklar himself in the neck with it, knocking him out.

== Characters affiliated with the Fox River 8 ==
=== Nick Savrinn ===
Nick Savrinn (played by Frank Grillo) is a lawyer working for Project Justice. After witnessing his boss’ refusal to assist Veronica Donovan in trying to exonerate Lincoln Burrows, Nick decides to take on the case himself. Together, he and Veronica set off to find evidence to support Lincoln's innocence. Thanks to Nick's connections, they discover that the security tape of Lincoln shooting was faked but when they go to find the original copy of the video tape, it was already damaged. Returning to Veronica's apartment, they find that the copy of the tape is lost. These events causes Veronica to question Nick's motives, as she suspects him to be in league with the conspiracy. He later deflects her accusations by providing possible new evidence. As the two continue to uncover the conspiracy In "Riots, Drills and the Devil (Part 2)", they are threatened via a public phone call in Washington, D.C. when they find the old offices of Ecofield, Terrence Steadman's company. This is followed by an explosion in Veronica's apartment causing the two to escape and go into hiding in Nick's father's cabin in New Glarus, Wisconsin. L. J. later joins them after he was also targeted by Agents Paul Kellerman and Daniel Hale. In later episodes, they finally have a break-through, learning of the real reason behind the framing of Lincoln and the complicity of the Vice President herself in this plot. In "And Then There Were 7", Nick, Veronica and L. J. narrowly escape from "The Company" agent Quinn. Nick is rushed to hospital with a gunshot wound. After he recovers, Nick and Veronica go to court for one last time to appeal for Lincoln on the day of his execution. They lose the appeal but fortuitously, an anonymous man gives the judge new evidence that allows him to stay the execution.

This renews their hope. Having learned that Terrence Steadman is still alive, they insist on having a medical examiner investigate Terrence Steadman's supposed body in "By the Skin and the Teeth". However, the dental records of the corpse match Steadman's. In "J-Cat", Nick, Veronica and L. J. return to New Glarus to visit the dead Quinn, where they obtain his cell phone. Following these phone records, they are able to find the location where Steadman is hiding. It is revealed in "The Key" that Nick had another motive for working with Veronica; he had struck a deal with John Abruzzi that in exchange for his father's freedom, he would keep watch on Veronica and deliver her at Abruzzi's request. When he is asked to bring Veronica with him to a landing strip in episode "Tonight", he is conflicted with Veronica and his father's safety. Ultimately in the next episode, Nick frees Veronica and tells her to get to Blackfoot to find Steadman. Empty-handed, Nick goes to his apartment to meet his father, where he witnesses his father being shot by one of Abruzzi's henchmen. Nick refuses to tell the henchman where Veronica is and as a result is killed.

=== Other affiliated characters ===
- Sylvia Abruzzi (played by Danielle Di Vecchio) is John Abruzzi's wife and mother to his children.
- Hector Avila (played by Kurt Caceres) is Sucre's cousin. A rival for Maricruz's affection, he is responsible for Sucre's incarceration, by calling in a police tip for a robbery. He later begins dating Maricruz, and tries to marry her in Las Vegas. She calls off the wedding after Sucre shows up, and an angry Hector learns she left on their honeymoon trip without him.
- Debra Jean Belle (played by Kristin Malko) is a college student from Utah who shares a ride there with Tweener after he responds to her advertisement on the campus ride board. Her suspicions of him wanes after she becomes infatuated with him. She later aids his escape by letting him take her car. Tweener later appears on her doorstep to make peace with her.
- Petey Cordero (played by Maurice Ripke) is Sucre's cousin. Sucre borrows his motorbike to get to Las Vegas to stop Hector and Maricruz's wedding.
- Maricruz Delgado (played by Camille Guaty) is Sucre's girlfriend. She was originally meant to be played by Nadine Velazquez. Maricruz becomes Sucre's primary motivation to escape after he learns that she is pregnant with his child, but is going to marry Sucre's cousin Hector. In season 2, Maricruz leaves Hector at the altar, and is briefly reunited with Sucre in Mexico, before Bellick chases Maricruz away and lies to Sucre about her whereabouts. In season 3, Sucre discovers his deception, but realizes that he has to stay away from her until he has gotten his life together. In season 4, Maricruz gives birth to their daughter, Lila Maria Sucre.
- Theresa Delgado (played by Rachel Loera) is Maricruz's sister, who travels with her to Mexico. Distrustful of Sucre, she later allows him to meet his newborn daughter, but sells him out to the cops and sets him up to be arrested.
- Philly Falzone (played by Al Sapienza) is part of the Chicago Mafia and a close associate of John Abruzzi. After Michael's incarceration, Falzone and other mobsters began pressuring Abruzzi to locate a witness called Fibonacci before the trial that will incriminate them all, even by threatening the lives of Abruzzi's children. Philly later takes Abruzzi's privileges from him and instead promotes Abruzzi's second-in-command, Gus, to the top of the prison hierarchy. Falzone is then tricked by Michael and Abruzzi to go to Canada to find Fibonacci, and Falzone and his men are arrested by the police.
- Dede Franklin (played by Helena Klevorn) is C-Note's daughter. She has a kidney disease. In season 2, her health deteriorates, forcing C-Note to turn himself in to save Dede's life.
- Kacee Franklin (played by Cynthia Kaye McWilliams) is C-Note's wife and the mother of his daughter Dede. Ignorant of her husband's incarceration until his escape, Kacee is reluctant to trust C-Note's plan for their family's reunion. However, when Agent Lang pressures her to make a choice, she chooses not to cooperate with the FBI. Kacee and her family escape to North Dakota before she is arrested for aiding and abetting her husband. She is later released as part of the deal her husband had with F.B.I. Special Agent Mahone.
- Susan Hollander (played by K.K. Dodds) is T-Bag's girlfriend in flashbacks in "Brother's Keeper". She turns him in to the police when she learns of his crimes. After escaping from prison, T-Bag holds Susan and her kids, Zack (Quinn Wermeling) and Gracey (Danielle Campbell), hostage in a delusional attempt to start a family, but she rejects him. Surprisingly, T-Bag spares their lives, and gives the police their location.
- Maggio (played by Rich Komenich) is a henchman for the Chicago mob. He is ordered by John Abruzzi to kidnap T-Bag's cousin, James. The job goes bad, resulting in the death of both Bagwell (Larry Neumann Jr.) and his young son (Bobby Linkhart). Maggio later attempts to aid Abruzzi's escape from Fox River.
- Mexican Man (played by Ismael 'East' Carlo) is an elderly man Sucre meets on his way to Ixtapa to meet Maricruz. After Sucre is ordered off the bus, the man gives him a place to stay overnight if he cooks for him. Sucre steals his car to carry on his journey and is caught by the local police, but the man covers for him, giving him petrol money and tells him to find his girl and then grace with God.
- Darius Morgan (played by Mike Jones) is C-Note's brother-in-law.
- Adrian Rix (played by Philip Rayburn Smith) is Lisa's husband. He is killed by Kellerman.
- Lisa Rix (played by Jessalyn Gilsig) is L. J. Burrows' mother. She and her husband Adrian are killed by agents Kellerman and Hale in "The Old Head". L. J. later attends her funeral.
- Gavin Smallhouse (played by Gianni Russo) is Abruzzi's henchman.
- Derek Sweeney (played by Karl Makinen) is Lincoln's friend who gives Lincoln tickets for a ferry to Panama.
- Trey (played by Andra Fuller) is a friend of C-Note, who helps him escape with Kacee & Dede.
- Nika Volek (played by Holly Valance) is Michael's wife, whom he married the day before his bank robbery, which landed him in prison. Nika was brought from the Czech Republic to America by sex traffickers. Michael paid them off for her freedom and arranged a deal; green card for smuggling a key card disguised as a credit card into prison for him. Nika is recognized by Bellick, who corners her at the strip club where she works. She eventually folds and "reveals" that she gave Michael a credit card, which Bellick is unable to find. Michael later calls for Nika's assistance again; now to steal a key that was crucial in the escape plan. Although she is reluctant, she agrees. After Michael and Lincoln escape from prison, Nika provides them with shelter and transportation. She ultimately feels, though, that while she has grown to love Michael, he just used her. Hurt, she pulls a gun on the brothers, only to find it empty. The brothers drive away, leaving Nika behind.

== Sona characters ==
=== Guards ===
- Colonel Escamilla (played by Carlos Compean) is the first commanding officer of Sona Federal Prison. He has shown himself to be a cold-blooded killer when he casually executes an inmate thought to have attempted an escape. He is later replaced by General Zavala because he was not an "effective leader".
- General Zavala (played by Castulo Guerra) is the second commanding officer of Sona after replacing Colonel Escamilla. Zavala is described as a powerful man in his province, and plays a central role in the episode "Boxed In", where he attempts to investigate the helicopter raid on Sona. After Michael reveals The Company's plot to break out James Whistler and his own involvement in the breakout attempts, Zavala captures Gretchen Morgan, the head of the Company mission, and authorizes her torture when she refuses to admit to her participation in the scheme. She eventually breaks, and offers to lead Zavala to where L. J. Burrows is held hostage. Instead, however, she leads him to the wrong location and ends up overpowering him and his guard. Zavala is then shot and killed by Gretchen. After being informed of his death, Michael commented that Zavala seemed like a good man.
- General Mestas (played by Julio Cedillo) is the short-tempered commander of Sona after General Zavala's death. In "Hell or High Water", he leads the efforts to capture the Sona 4.
- Captain Hurtado (played by Alex Fernandez) is a guard outside Sona Michael could not develop a plan to distract, leaving Lincoln and Gretchen to devise a plan.
- Rafael (played by Joseph Melendez) is one of the guards protecting the walls of Sona Federal Prison. He is immediately suspicious of Sucre upon his employment as the new Sona grave digger. After the Escape of the Sona 4, Rafael and the other guards discover that Sucre had aided the escape. They torture him for information on their whereabouts, but when Sucre proves unwilling to divulge any information, they throw him into the prison.
- Captain Sojo (played by Marco Rodriguez) is a guard at Sona. In "Hell or High Water" he leads the pursuit of the Sona 4, and reports back to General Mestas frequently.
- Gravedigger (played by Anthony Escobar) is the gravedigger at Sona. When Michael realizes they need his help to break out, Lincoln, Sofía and Gretchen try to recruit him. After they pay him the money he demands, he asks for more. Gretchen realizes that he will turn them in after getting all the money he can from them, and kills him. Sucre, using an alias, replaces him.

=== Inmates ===
- Luis "McGrady" Gallego (played by Carlo Alban) is a 17-year-old prisoner of Sona. He appears in every episode of season 3. He has a love for all things American, initiating his interest to befriend Michael Scofield in Orientación. McGrady (his nickname, based on the basketball jersey he wears of former NBA star Tracy McGrady) quickly becomes Michael's ally, helping him to obtain objects necessary to further his escape plan. When McGrady learns of the escape, he confronts Michael demanding to be included. Fearing for McGrady's safety, Michael at first refuses, but is unable to persuade him to stay and later relents, allowing McGrady into the escape, but tells McGrady he cannot be responsible for him on the outside. In "Hell or High Water" McGrady successfully escapes from Sona along with Michael and other inmates, but then separates from the group along with his father. McGrady is then reunited with his family in Colombia, when his father smuggles him through the border.
- Andrew Tyge (played by Dominic Keating) arrives as a new inmate in "Interference" who recognizes Whistler by a different name. Despite his prior social status, he finds himself at the bottom of the social ladder in Sona. Bellick attempts to bond with him by giving him food. He spied on Michael, Mahone, and Whistler while they plotting their escape which prompts Mahone to threaten Tyge to mind his own businesses. In "Photo Finish", Bellick once again tries to bond with him by inviting him to play dice with him. Tyge rudely brushes Bellick off saying he doesn't want to have sex with him, embarrassing Bellick in front of the other inmates. Later, he is found murdered and Michael suspects Mahone, Whistler, and Bellick as those three were the only inmates that Tyge interacted with who would have motive to kill him. Mahone is revealed to be his killer after his shiv is discovered.
- Pistachio (played by Joe Holt) is a transsexual inmate of Sona who serves as the prison barber. He first appears in "Call Waiting" in which Bellick unsuccessfully attempts to flirt with him in order to retrieve a shoe Pistachio took from a dead prisoner. He appears in several other episodes of season 3 usually in the background. His fate following the destruction of Sona is unknown.
- Sapo (played by Cullen Douglas) is a Costa Rican inmate in Sona who was arrested a week before the events of "Orientación". He is stripped to his underwear and along with Bellick, is forced to clean the prison and not given food. He steals the shoes off another dead inmate before Bellick can reach them. He somewhat befriends Bellick, due to them sharing the same misery. Due to his inability to get food, he attempts to escape the prison, but is shot and killed by the guards, upsetting Bellick.
- World (played by Sala Baker) is an inmate in Sona who Lechero sets up to fight Michael to the death in "Orientación" by tricking him into believing Michael has stolen his drugs. Michael breaks his knees, but is unable to kill him. Mahone kills him after he attempts to use a shank. Bellick places a note in his pocket before the fight, which Sofía finds. It is mentioned in a conversation overheard by T-Bag that he had six consecutive life sentences.
- Wyatt (played by Ravil Isyanov) is an inmate in Sona who leads a riot against Lechero after the water supply is lost. After the problem is resolved, he is drowned by Lechero, Papo and Sammy.

=== Lechero's gang ===
- Sammy Norino (played by Laurence Mason) is an inmate and Lechero's right-hand man. He is temperamental and violent, and is easily undefeated in the Sona death matches. Sammy dislikes Lechero's new henchman, T-Bag, and is increasingly uncertain of Lechero's leadership. He later expresses his desire to reinforce Lechero's gang with the inmate Cristobal and his men, which Lechero warily accepts. Sammy is outraged when Lechero refuses to kill Michael after Sammy's friend Papo is killed, falsely accused for Michael's escape attempt. Augusto, Lechero's cousin, has a gun delivered to Sammy, encouraging him to overthrow Lechero. Egged on by Cristobal, Sammy stages a coup to take control of Sona in the episode "Dirt Nap", though he allows Lechero to live, and places a bounty on Scofield's head. When Michael is captured, Sammy realizes that he and Lechero are secretly planning to escape. Visibly hurt, he plans to kill Michael but never gets the chance, as he dies when the escape tunnel caves-in on him. It collapsed due to being intentionally sabotaged by Michael. At the end of the episode, Lechero, back in power, kicks Sammy's dead body off his balcony. Lechero also mentions in this episode that he “couldn't even run shipments from one dock to another” implying this is why he is in Sona.
- Papo (played by Davi Jay) is one of Lechero's thugs. Falsely accused of attempting an escape, he is promptly shot by Colonel Escamilla.
- Cheo (played by Curtis Wayne) is one of Lechero's henchmen. He is falsely blamed for taking tribute from Augusto and is killed by Lechero. He mentions in "Good Fences" that he was a truck driver before his incarceration.
- Cristobal (played by Rey Gallegos) is a tough inmate in Sona. After joining Lechero's crew, he helps Sammy to overthrow Lechero. He is killed by Lechero when Sammy's rule ends.
- Cyrus (played by Alec Rayme) is an inmate in Sona in Cristobal's gang. After Cristobal's gang joins Lechero's crew, he helps Sammy overthrow Lechero. After Sammy is killed, he and Cristobal are shot and killed by Lechero when they attempt to escape. Their bodies are later kicked off Lechero's balcony, along with Sammy's.
- Juan Nieves (played by Manny Rubio) is Lechero's lieutenant in charge of Sona drug distribution. T-Bag kills him to climb in the ranks, staging the death to look like an overdose.
- Octavio (played by Mike Seal) is an inmate in Sona in Cristobal's gang. After joining Lechero's crew, he exercises his "power" by telling Bellick to clean up vomit. Bellick refuses, and pushes Octavio, causing him to step in the vomit. Octavio challenges him to a fight to the death due to this. After Sammy decrees the fight will take place, Bellick defeats Octavio by using knuckle wraps dipped in acetone.

=== Outside Sona ===
- Carmelita (played by Crystal Mantecón) is Lechero's prostitute, entering Sona disguised as a nun, Sister Mary Francis. She falls in love with T-Bag, and helps him take over Sona. She also appears in the first episode of season 4 with T-Bag.
- Alphonso Gallego (played by Gustavo Mellado) is McGrady's father. In "Hell or High Water", he aides his son's escape from Sona and reunites him with the rest of the family.
- Augusto (played by F.J. Rio) is Lechero's cousin and leads his organisation outside Sona. In a bid for power, Augusto smuggles a gun to Sammy and urges him to betray Lechero.
- Osberto (played by Felix Pire) is a criminal outside Sona. He does not speak English, requiring Lincoln to bring Sofía to translate for him. Lincoln buys a bomb from him, which Sucre plants on Gretchen, though it fails to kill her.
- Sancho (played by Nathan Castadena) is a criminal who gets T-Bag in touch with coyotes to transport him back to the States. He assures T-Bag he can trust them, but the coyotes, wanting all of T-Bag's money, betray him and T-Bag, leaving them in the desert to die. He tries to kill T-Bag to eat him, to avoid starving, but fails and dies himself. After T-Bag is rescued, he implies to his rescuers that he ate Sancho to stay alive. The actor who plays this character also portrays a Sona inmate (credited as "Mariano") in "Dirt Nap".

== Characters in Yemen ==
=== Ogygia Inmates ===
- Abu Ramal (played by Numan Acar) is the leader of the ISIL forces in Yemen, and incarcerated in Ogygia Prison. Michael and Whip are there to break him out. In "Kaniel Outis" he and Michael are revealed to be friends after he is released from solitary confinement, and he is revealed to be in on the escape. In the next episode, he tries to execute Michael's cellmate Sid for being homosexual, but Michael tries to stop him, as Sid's father is engineering their escape. Ramal refuses, though the guards then stop him. Michael has already made plans to abandon him, though, and by engineering a fight with Whip which the guards then break up, he steals a guard's watch and plants it on Ramal. Ramal, meanwhile, plans to bring his cellmates, also members of ISIL, along on the escape, despite the agreement being only he gets out. When the guards find the watch on him, he realizes the betrayal, and has his cellmates steal the guns from the guards and run for Michael's cell. When he gets there he shoots and kills Muza, another inmate trying to escape, before they are caught and detained. He, along with Michael, Whip and Ja, who were on the roof, is thrown into solitary where he vows to kill Michael for his betrayal. In the next episode, the ISIL strikes get closer, and he realizes when ISIL inevitably takes the city they will free him. When tools for an escape are revealed to be hidden in his cell, formerly Michael's, he refuses to help them escape. However, when Muza's brother tries to break into solitary to use him as a bargaining chip in revenge for Muza's death, he agrees, and opens Michael's cell. Michael releases Whip and Ja, and after some deliberation, Ramal as well. They make it to the infirmary, where Ramal calls ISIL to meet them outside an auto shop. Eventually, joined by Sid, the group makes it over the wall. Michael tries to double cross him again by sending Ja to the shop first, but Ramal sees through this and has his men capture the group. As he is about to kill them, Lincoln arrives and kills his men, allowing Whip to kill Ramal, which turns him into a martyr. As this was filmed, all of ISIL knows who killed him, and they declare war on Michael's group for Ramal's death.
- Cross (played by TJ Ramini) is an inmate at Ogygia. He and his brother Muza are Christians, and were arrested for chopping up people and hiding the pieces in the desert. When he and Michael were in solitary, Michael tried to convince him to escape together, but he refused, unwilling to abandon his brother. In "The Liar", he tries to convince Whip that Michael will betray him. When the escape is revealed, he and Muza attack a guard and race to Michael's cell, and open it, beating up Sid, who is inside. He tries to lift Muza up to the ceiling, but Michael says he will only pull them in if they give him Sid first. While they argue, Ramal arrives and kills Muza, devastating Cross. In the following episode, he rallies the other inmates to break into solitary, kill Michael and use Ramal as a bargaining chip so ISIL will let them go, in revenge for Muza's death. He eventually manages to steal a machine gun and shoot the door, but Michael's group has already escaped. He pursues them through the prison, but eventually is stabbed and killed by Sid.
- Ja (played by Rick Yune) is a Korean inmate in the same cell as Michael, Whip and Sid. He is incarcerated for identity theft, and possibly drug use, and is a genius. He is a drug addict, and also enjoys the music of Queen, mentioning multiple times that he owns Freddie Mercury's ashes in his apartment in Seoul. Michael obtains pills for his withdrawal to use a phone that he has snuck into the prison. He later joins the escape, but is caught and placed in solitary with Michael, Whip and Ramal. They escape, but he is supposedly declared a liability and ordered to leave by Michael, though Michael actually just put a note in his pocket to take a shortcut to the auto shop to ambush Ramal. He stays with Michael's group, trusting his judgement, and proves his worth on multiple occasions, such as tricking two ISIL members into shooting a mannequin covered in rubbing alcohol, and later following seagulls to Phaecia, where he is amazed by the freedom, as he is used to his apartment, his phone screen, his drug addiction and Ogygia. To enjoy this freedom, he decides to stay in Phaecia to start over while Lincoln, Michael and Whip head to Crete, Greece by boat.
- Muza (played by Shaun Omaid) is the brother of fellow Ogygia inmate Cross. He and his brother are Christians, and were arrested for chopping up people and hiding the pieces in the desert. In "The Liar", when the escape is revealed, he and Cross attack a guard and race to Michael's cell, and open it, beating up Sid. Cross tries to lift him up to the ceiling, but Michael says he will only pull them in if they give him Sid first. While they argue, Ramal arrives and kills Muza, devastating Cross.
- Sid al-Tunis (played by Kunal Sharma) is the cellmate of Michael, Whip and Ja, given a twenty-year sentence for homosexuality. His first lover was a friend's father, but when his wife found out, she had her brothers bury him alive. He worries constantly that Ramal and his men will kill him. His father is the one who is recruited to cause a blackout in Yemen, allowing them to escape under cover of darkness. When the escape fails, he is not put in solitary, as he was not found on the roof. He is ostracized by Cross for defending Michael, and later kills Cross to save Michael. After the escape, he continually shows fear, at one point even asking Whip to kill him while they are temporarily safe, as he wants to be able to go out on his terms if nothing else. When the group heads to the airport, he is attacked by Cyclops, a one-eyed ISIL sympathizer, and stabbed several times, though he handcuffs himself to Cyclops before he dies. Michael grieves over his death, but tells the group not to waste time killing Cyclops, as they need to get to the airport. His body appears one last time in "Phaecia", when other ISIL members cut Cyclops free of it.

=== Other ===
- Cyclops (played by Amin El Gamal) is a sympathizer of ISIL but looked down on by his peers because he is blind in one eye. He wears a pair of glasses with the lens of his blind eye shaded. He is first seen in "Kaniel Outis", in an ISIL-controlled suburb, where he and Sheba are revealed to know each other, and he is revealed to have feelings for her. He later appears in "The Liar" where he tries to rape Sheba after she and Lincoln try to obtain fake passports. He is stopped and severely beaten by Lincoln. After Ramal's death, he tries to help ISIL find the killers, but they reject his help, so he tracks them on his own, and manages to trace their movements well. He realizes they will be at the train station, and later finds them on the road to the airport, where he kills Sid before being beaten again by Lincoln. He is left handcuffed to Sid's corpse. ISIL releases him, but says he is no longer useful, angering him. When he sees them headed to the group's location, he hijacks a car, and arrives at the gas station after the other members of ISIL are killed. He then refuels and follows Michael's group into the desert, knowing he has more gas than them. Michael tricks him into following him and abandoning the others, and eventually they fight, in which Michael stabs him in his remaining eye and he stabs Michael with a blade poisoned by antifreeze. Michael leaves in his (Cyclops') car, leaving him behind to die in the desert, though he claims Michael will also die. He presumably dies. His real name, according to Sheba, is Reza, but after joining ISIL, he is called "Abu Amir".
- Ibrahim (played by Brian George) is a federal judge who went to school with Sheba's father. He gets a pardon for "Kaniel Outis" in exchange for a car to escape Yemen which Sheba's father provides (and had no use for). It is later revealed that he knew the pardon would be useless due to the guards abandoning the prison.
- Jamil (played by Faran Tahir) is Sheba's father, and a government official. After Lincoln rescues Sheba from Cyclops, he helps him get a pardon for "Kaniel Outis". Later, he escapes from Yemen with C-Note, Sheba and the rest of his family.
- Mohammed al-Tunis (played by Waleed Zuaiter) is Sid's father and the "Sheik of Light", in charge of the power in the city. He agreed to cause a blackout to allow his son to escape prison. When he was supposed to, however, he was trapped in an ISIL-controlled suburb searching for his daughter, a schoolteacher with several girls also stuck in that suburb. He, his daughter and the girls are rescued by Lincoln, C-Note and Sheba, and he and C-Note put the plan into action, though it fails. It is unknown if he knows what happened to his son.
- Mustapha (played by Bobby Naderi) is a guard at Ogygia prison. He dislikes "Kaniel Outis". He is willing to allow Sid to die. Michael steals his gold watch as part of a ploy to get Ramal detained, and he realizes what Michael has done, but finds the watch on Ramal. He later leads the guards in abandoning the prison when ISIL takes control. Lincoln pursues him to get the keys to the prison, but he is killed by ISIL, though Lincoln still manages to get the keys.
- Omar (played by Akin Gazi) is Sheba's friend. He trades Lincoln's passport for a visit to Ogygia. Later he informs Lincoln that his passport is long gone by now. After they miss the plane out of the country, Michael, Lincoln, Whip and Ja find him and ask for a ride out with him. He agrees if they bring another car. The group leaves Whip to watch him while going to get it, and realize he is trying to betray them to ISIL. They escape ISIL and bring both cars, and Omar, to a gas station on the way to Phaecia, the settlement Omar is headed to. At the gas station, they are ambushed by ISIL, where Omar is shot after being revealed to carry a gun with only one bullet (to shoot himself). He later dies after the group leaves the station. They bury him in the desert. When Lincoln, Whip and Ja reach Phaecia, they lie and say Omar had to go somewhere else due to the war, and asked them to bring the things in his car to Phaecia, as the residents recognize his car.
- Zakat (played by Michael Benyaer) is the captain of the guard at Ogygia Prison. He is dedicated to the law. He stops Ramal from executing Sid for homosexuality, and is later the only guard who does not abandon the prison when ISIL takes control. He continues to try to keep the prison in order by himself, taking a machine gun to do so, but is later killed by Cross, who takes the gun.

== In Ithaca, New York ==
- Andrew "Theroux" Nelson (played by Devin Mackenzie) is a computer analyst at University of Ithaca and friend of Jacob Ness. He tells Sara how A&W and Van Gogh hacked her phone. Later, he is revealed to be a member of 21-Void. He decodes Michael's new tattoo, and is later assigned to guard Mike by Jacob. However, Lincoln and Sara rescue Mike, and he is arrested. His testimony is later instrumental in causing the CIA to believe the evidence Michael found. His alias is "Theroux".
- Emily "A&W" Blake (played by Marina Benedict) is one of Poseidon's henchmen who, along with Van Gogh, chases Sara and Mike. She shoots Jacob in the leg in the first episode, and calls contacts in Yemen to kill Lincoln and C-Note. She and Van Gogh later track Sara's phone, though she escapes, and later track T-Bag to Kellerman's house, where Van Gogh kills Kellerman, though T-Bag escapes. She and Van Gogh later meet with Jacob Ness, and are later arrested when Jacob claims he paid them and put a tracker in the money. They are later bailed out, and she asks a former lover (revealing her to be lesbian) to put a drone on "Outis", and then calls ISIL in Yemen to attack Michael's crew. They once again escape and she is told off by her former lover. She later kills Agent Kishida when he investigates her and Van Gogh. She later helps Poseidon and Van Gogh try to find Michael, but he gets away. Later she disguises herself as Sara, and ambushes Michael and his son at the lake house. She shows disapproval of Van Gogh's decision to abandon Poseidon after the job is done. During the final confrontation between Michael and Poseidon, A&W shoots and kills Whip. In retaliation, T-Bag snaps her neck.
- Blue Hawaii (played by Duncan Ollerenshaw) is a man who Michael (before recruiting Whip) broke out of prison on one of his missions for Poseidon. He is very good at creating scenes, down to the detail. He is also an Elvis impersonator. He is first contacted by Michael from a gas station in Yemen, though when A&W and Van Gogh investigate him, they apparently do not find anything. He later is contacted again by T-Bag and Whip, and is revealed to be part of the plan to bring Poseidon down. He also says Michael broke him out in exchange for a favor in the future. It is revealed that this "favor" was to recreate the scene of the crime Michael was framed for committing in the back of a truck. Michael leads Jacob to this scene and lets Jacob fire a blank at him. The images of Jacob committing the crime, down to the detail, are all taken, framing Jacob for the crime he actually committed. Blue Hawaii later drives the truck away (and presumably takes apart the scene), to avoid the conspiracy being revealed.
- Heather (played by Crystal Balint) is Sara's best friend. Sara goes to her place when she suspects Jacob of working with those who shot him. Later, Sara sends her to pick up Mike from a friend's house, and when she brings him home they are ambushed by Van Gogh. Her fate is not revealed.
- Kishida (played by Curtis Lum) is an agent in Kellerman's division in the state department. He is later promoted after Kellerman's murder. When he confronts A&W and Van Gogh on their visit to the NSA, A&W kills him.
- Luca Abruzzi (played by Leo Rano) is John Abruzzi's son. Lincoln began working for him after the scuba shop failed. After botching a drug run, Luca is out to get him. He arranges for flights to bring Lincoln, Michael, Whip and Sucre back to the states, but when he confronts the brothers, C-Note and Sheba trick him into thinking DEA agents are arriving for his product, forcing him to run. When he realizes he has been tricked again, he pursues them. His men eventually shoot Lincoln outside the lake house. After escaping from the hospital, Lincoln ensures Luca's arrest by the FBI.
- Mike Scofield (played by Christian Michael Cooper) is Michael and Sara's son. He looks up to Michael and Lincoln, and enjoys drawing. He is revealed to leave Legos for a friend using the drawings as maps, showing he has the same creative genius as his father.
- Van Gogh (played by Steve Mouzakis) is one of Poseidon's henchmen who, along with A&W, chases Sara and Mike. They later track Sara's phone, though she escapes, and later track T-Bag to Kellerman's house, where Van Gogh kills Kellerman, though T-Bag escapes. A conversation he has with Kellerman before shooting causes him to start doubting his boss' motives. They later meet with Jacob Ness, and are later arrested when Jacob claims he paid them and put a tracker in the money. They are later bailed out, and put a drone on "Outis", and then call ISIL in Yemen to attack Michael's crew. They once again escape. Van Gogh later helps Poseidon and A&W try to find Michael, but he gets away. He also captures Mike to control Sara, but later reveals to A&W that he intends to abandon Poseidon after the job is done. Van Gogh is shot by A&W and though he initially survives, he is left on a ventilator and both a doctor and Van Gogh himself indicate that his wounds are mortal. Learning of his presence in the hospital, Sara is able to convince Van Gogh to give her Mike's location. They then share a nod before Sara departs. While not stated, Van Gogh presumably dies of his wounds.

== Miscellaneous characters ==
=== Roland Glenn ===
Roland Glenn (played by James Hiroyuki Liao) is a computer hacker, identity thief and a reluctant member of Self's covert "A-Team" to track down Scylla. His computer skills are essential to the group due to the advanced technology the company uses to shield Scylla. Prior to his conviction, he made a device that could download information off any electronic devices near it, which the "A-Team" uses to get information on Scylla. However, Roland's somewhat shady past and constant inappropriate comments make him disliked by most of the other members of the team, especially Lincoln and Sucre. Despite this, Roland works with the others in the early episodes of the season and serves the role of an uneasy ally, completing the team's objectives but also showing tendencies of greed and selfishness. As he is relentlessly threatened and bullied by several team members, Roland becomes increasingly disloyal. In the episode "Blow Out", he overhears Mahone's phone conversation with the Company hitman Wyatt and secretly obtains the phone number Mahone threw in the trash.

The rest of the "A-Team" come to resent him after learning that while on the Vegas mission, he ditched the team to gamble in a casino and had the device taken from him. Michael finally cuts him out of the mission in the next episode "The Price", causing Roland to take on the role of antagonist by double-crossing the team, offering Scofield and Burrows’ location to Wyatt for $1 million. When they meet at the end of the episode, however, Wyatt does not pay him. Instead he tortures Roland with bullets to the kneecaps until he gives up the warehouse's location and then delivers a fatal gunshot to Roland's abdomen. As Roland lies on the pavement dying, Michael holds his hand as he bleeds to death, unable to do anything else for him.

=== Felicia Lang ===
Felicia Lang (played by Barbara Eve Harris) is an FBI agent tasked with aiding Alexander Mahone in his pursuit of the Fox River Eight. Lang is introduced in the season 2 episode "Scan", where she is assigned by Mahone to urge Kacee Franklin to betray her husband, which she seems somewhat reluctant to participate in. She returns in "Unearthed", organizing a sting operation involving C-Note's wife in an attempt to capture C-Note and threatens Kacee's daughter for her to co-operate. Unlike Agent Wheeler, Lang never verbally criticizes Mahone's methods and seems supportive of his command. Because of this, Mahone appears to trust her more and assigns her to follow Sara Tancredi, who they hope would lead them to Michael Scofield. They fail to track Sara back to the brothers. Sara surrenders herself and Lang arrests her. Although Lang initially seems wary of Mahone's unstable temperament, she shows open concern for him when Internal Affairs close in on him at the end of season 2. In season 3, Lang visits Mahone in the Panamanian prison Sona, where he is incarcerated. She offers him a reduced sentence in exchange for his testimony against The Company. Lang soon becomes aware of Mahone's drug-addiction; she agrees to get pills for him, but arrives too late to see him testify, while strung-out and irrational. Reluctantly, she returns him to Sona. In season 4, Mahone calls her to help identify his son's killer. In a later episode, he asks her and Wheeler to help him bring down The Company, but is unable to provide proof so Wheeler forces her to arrest him. Mahone later escapes custody; Lang, unable to shoot him, lets him go. In the epilogue of season 4 Mahone is seen as having a relationship with Lang, leaving her behind to go visit Michael's grave.

=== Mark Wheeler ===
Mark Wheeler (played by Jason Davis) is an FBI agent that accompanies and helps Alexander Mahone track down the "Fox River 8" from the FBI Field Office in Chicago. The character is initially used mainly for expositional purposes, but later gets his own subplot as the agent attempting to expose Mahone's actions. After the death of John Abruzzi, Wheeler becomes suspicious of Mahone's motives, and later shows frustration that Mahone is keeping him in the dark about his activities in New Mexico. After Michael and Lincoln's speech is broadcast in "The Message", Wheeler directly questions Mahone's methods and soon announces that the FBI headquarters and Internal Affairs will be monitoring Mahone's actions. In "Sweet Caroline", when Wheeler finds out about C-Note's deal with Mahone, he goes to see C-Note to gather evidence on Mahone's misconduct. He promises C-Note full protection in exchange for his testimony against Mahone. Wheeler then notifies Internal Affairs Director Richard Sullins and together they begin to build up enough evidence to arrest Mahone. Sensing the impending betrayal, Mahone confronts Wheeler in the FBI parking garage, and although angry about the betrayal, expresses his admiration for Wheeler for having the courage to do the right thing and leaves him unharmed before fleeing the country. Wheeler returns in season 4. He reluctantly meets with Mahone and agrees to help in his struggle with The Company. But once Mahone is unable to provide any proof, Wheeler forces Agent Lang to arrest him. Mahone ultimately escapes, however.

=== Other miscellaneous characters ===
- Sebastian Balfour (played by Anthony Starke) is Veronica's fiancé, though they break-up in "Cell Test". He is later killed by Company hitman Quinn in order to find Veronica.
- Leticia Barris (played by Adina Porter) is the girlfriend of one of Lincoln's criminal associates, Crab Simmons (Tab Baker). Veronica persuades her to give an affidavit against the Company, but she is later kidnapped and killed by Kellerman and Hale.
- Edna Bellick (played by Carolyn Wickwire) is Bellick's elderly mother.
- Bruce Bennett (played by Wilbur Fitzgerald) is a close aid and long-time friend of Frank Tancredi. After Frank Tancredi is murdered and his daughter Sara Tancredi attacked, Bruce is believed to be a traitor. He later proves to have been innocent. Bruce returns in season 4, where he is revealed to have sheltered Sara after her return from Panama. He is later captured and killed by the Company hitman, Wyatt, after being tricked into disclosing Sara's location.
- Andrew Blauner (played by Dameon Clarke) is a salesperson at GATE. He is suspicious of T-Bag when he arrives as Cole Pfeiffer. Blauner investigates, and discovers that Pfeiffer is a fraud. Later, he is killed by Gretchen so that T-Bag can keep his identity as Pfeiffer.
- Coyote (played by José Zúñiga) is a man who Michael arranges a deal to provide nitro-glycerin in exchange for an escape plane to Panama. He double crosses Michael by alerting the authorities about the plane.
- Danielle Curtin (played by Demi Lovato) is a young girl travelling with her father Jerry. After T-Bag makes a pass at her, she is seen freaking as she watches him drive away in her father's car.
- Jerry Curtin (played by JB Blanc) is a man travelling with his young daughter Danielle, (Demi Lovato). He offers T-Bag (who is posing as an ex-army veteran, Clyde May) a ride.
- Denise (played by Sylva Kelegian) is a postal worker T-Bag seduces in order to get Susan Hollander's new address details. He kills her after she sees his wanted poster on the wall of her workplace.
- Georgie (played by Tara Karsian) is a bartender in Los Angeles. She is sympathetic toward Sara, and lies when Wyatt comes looking for her. Later she helps Mahone track Wyatt.
- Cooper Green (played by Kevin Dunn) is government official, the brothers seek assistance from to expose Reynolds and the tape and to seek their exoneration.
- Marty Gregg (played by Mark Harelik) is Sara's attorney when she is brought to trial after the escape.
- Dr. Marvin Gudat (played by Ranjit Chowdhry) is a vet who re-attaches T-Bag's severed hand. T-Bag kills him and steals his car.
- Allison Hale (played by Jennifer Kern) is Daniel Hale's wife.
- Feng Huan (played by Ron Yuan) is a Chinese businessman interested in purchasing Scylla from Cole Pfeiffer (Bagwell) and Gretchen. He has little or no remorse for associates who fail him. However, his efforts to acquire Scylla are thwarted, and he is killed by Agent Hultz.
- Miriam Holtz, who went by the alias Trishanne Smith (played by Shannon Lucio) is a GATE secretary/Homeland Security agent. She first appears in "Shutdown" and "Eagles and Angels" as a secretary at the GATE corporation when T-Bag arrives there under the alias Cole Pfeiffer. She soon becomes involved in T-Bag's affairs, and in "Five the Hard Way", he uses her to capture Michael Scofield. In the next episode she agrees to work with T-Bag and Gretchen in exchange for a cut of the Scylla money. In "The Legend", however, T-Bag finds out that she is actually an undercover federal agent working for Don Self. He and Gretchen arranges to set her up, but she escapes in time to return to GATE to rescue the employees, who have been taken hostage by Gretchen and T-Bag. She manages to arrest T-Bag, but is later betrayed and killed by Self, who steals Scylla to find another buyer.
- Kristine Kellerman (played by Tina Holmes) is Kellerman's younger sister.
- Judge Randall Kessler (played by Joel Hatch) is the judge presiding over the case suggesting Terrence Steadman's death was faked.
- President Richard Mills (played by Daniel J. Travanti) was the President of the United States. Caroline Reynolds poisoned him and took his position.

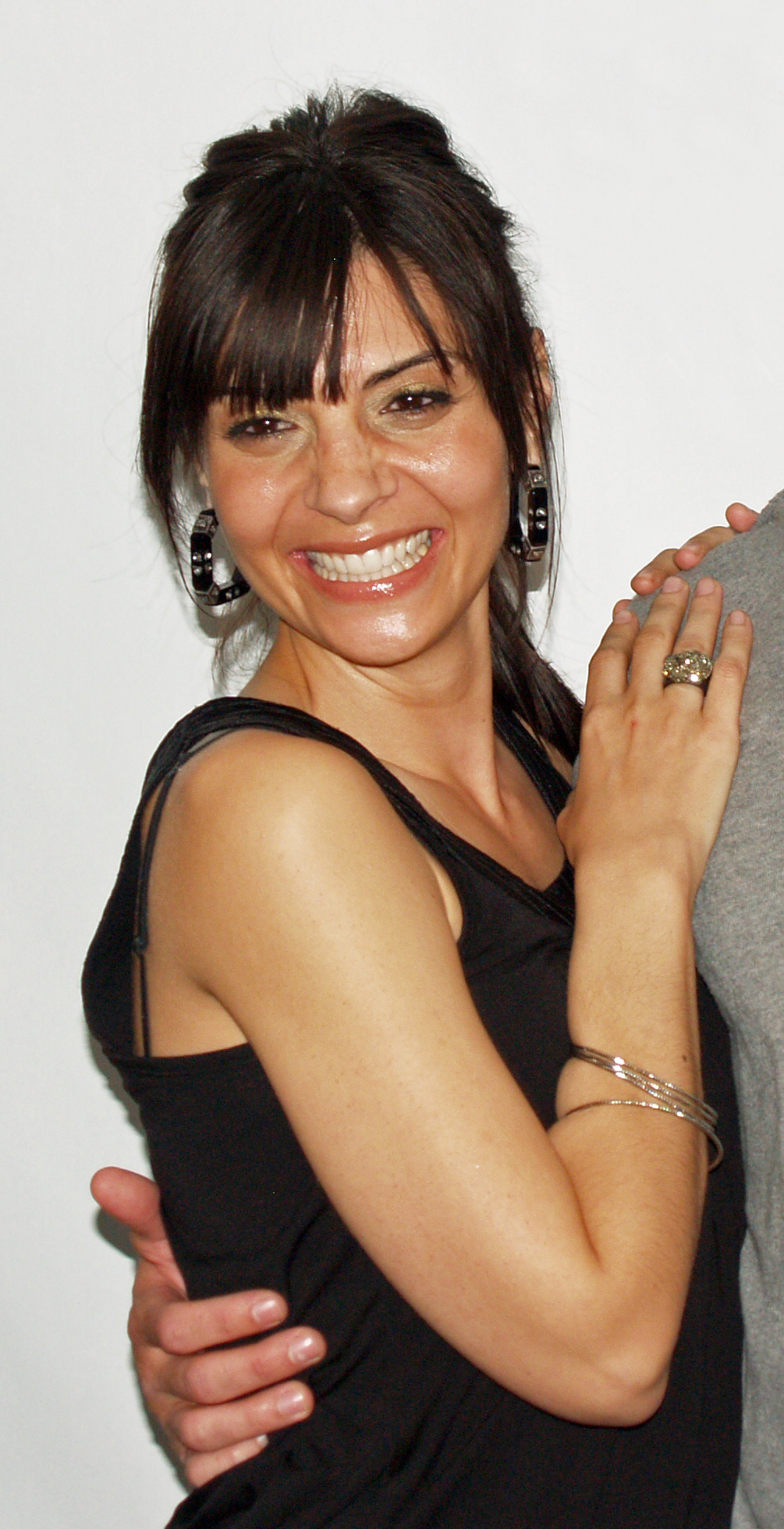
Callie Thorne – character: Pamela Mahone

- Pamela "Pam" Mahone (née Larson), (played by Callie Thorne) is Mahone's ex-wife who lives in Colorado with their son Cameron (Zachary Friedman). Michael visited her in "Unearthed" and learned that Mahone had kicked her out of the house to prevent her from discovering that he buried Oscar Shales after he murdered him. Mahone later attempts to reconcile, and pleads with her to take him back. She seems happy about this and starts making plans to meet him in Panama, but after being incarcerated, he calls her again and tells her to forget he ever existed. Her son is murdered by Company assassin Wyatt in season 4 as they seek to tie up loose ends, using his death to flush out Mahone. In "Safe and Sound", she meets Mahone and gives him a gun to kill Wyatt. After torturing Wyatt, Mahone makes him apologize to his wife for the murder of Cameron.
- Rita Morgan (played by Heather McComb) is Gretchen's sister. She is introduced in "Blow Out". Although she is taking care of Emily (Regan Licciardello), it is revealed that Gretchen is Emily's biological mother. Rita and Emily are later taken hostage by T-Bag and Self, and Rita is the catalyst of T-Bag's decision to seek redemption when she convinces him not to kill Ralph Becker.
- Jeanette Owens (played by Diana Scarwid) is a homeowner in Toele, Utah, where the $5 million is discovered, beneath the garage. She is taken hostage, along with her daughter, Ann when the escapees discover the location of the long lost millions.
- Ann Owens (played by Alexandra Lydon) the pregnant cop daughter of Jeanette Owens in Toele, Utah, taken hostage when the escapees are digging for the $5 million.
- Lucasz Peshcopi (played by Howie Johnson) A groundskeeper who walks Veronica inside when she thought that Nick Savrinn took the tape. He is seen later and helps Veronica and Nick take the boxes of papers inside and is burned alive by a trap set up by Paul Kellerman.
- Judith "Judy" Pope (played by Deanna Dunagan) is Henry Pope's wife.
- Sasha Murray (played by Kaley Cuoco) is a young girl who, with her boyfriend Matt (Daniel Ross Owens) meets Haywire shortly after his escape and asks him to buy them some beer. Haywire later kills her father, after seeing bruises on her arms from her father's mistreatment.
- Oscar Shales (played by Jimmy Daniels) is a man Mahone hunted and eventually caught, murdering him and burying him in his backyard, leading to the breakdown of his marriage to Pam and drug addiction.
- Sid (played by Laura Scott Wade) is the artist who Michael gets to put his tattoos on him.
- Crab Simmons (played by Tab Baker) is a criminal associate of Lincoln's who appears when he is persuaded to kill a supposed drug dealer in order to settle a $90,000 debt. According to his girlfriend Leticia Barris, his murder was covered up as a drug overdose, he "didn't use" as he had a bad heart.
- Kathryn Slattery (played by Romy Rosemont) is a detective in Kansas, who questions Bellick after Geary's death and arrests him for Geary's murder (framed by T-Bag, who killed Geary).
- Dr. Erik Stammel (played by Taylor Nichols) is a psychiatrist, who T-Bag visits, kills and steals his identity to escape to Panama.
- Herb Stanton (played by Michael O'Neill) is Don Self's boss and the director of Homeland Security in Los Angeles. He is introduced in the season 4 episode "Shutdown", where he attempts to cancel the Scylla operation. The character has a prominent role in "Deal or No Deal" where he is initially fooled by Self's ploy to frame the A-team for the theft of Scylla and sets out to re-capture them, though he and Senator Conrad Dallow (David Clennon) later discover the truth. However, in an effort to keep the failed operation a secret, Stanton convinces Dallow to murder the team. He is about to kill Michael when he is shot and killed by a Company operative.
- Leslie Steadman (played by Mary Beth Fisher) is Terrence Steadman's wife. Veronica and Nick (under aliases' Francette Kelly and Dick Sissler), come out of hiding to question her and investigate the conspiracy.
- Richard Sullins (played by Kim Coates) is an FBI Internal Affairs agent who has a serious grudge with Mahone. He is introduced in the episode "Dead Fall" where he investigates Mahone's role in the deaths of John Abruzzi and David "Tweener" Apolskis. He uncovers many inconsistencies in Mahone's report, but is then abruptly called off by a supervisor. However, Sullins returns to the show in the episode "Panama", where makes a deal with Benjamin Miles "C-Note" Franklin to release him in exchange for testimony against Mahone, but Mahone flees the country before Sullins can arrest him. Sullins also appears for three episodes in season 3. After Mahone is incarcerated at a Panamanian prison called Sona, Sullins and Agent Lang visits him and convince him to testify against The Company in exchange for a reduced sentence back in the U.S. Sullins arranges for a hearing in "Bang & Burn", but then discovers that Mahone is a drug addict and cannot testify because he is becoming worse at the need of his drugs to control himself. Sullin's character makes one last appearance in The Final Break during the now exonerated Mahone's reinstatement hearing. Sullins initially denies the reinstatement and then attempts to manipulate Mahone to report on the activities of Michael Scofield in exchange for being allowed back into the FBI.
- Frank Tancredi (played by John Heard) is the governor of Illinois and Sara's father. The character's strict policies on crime earned him the nickname "Frontier Justice Frank". He disapproves of Sara's decision to work at Fox River. Tancredi travels to Fox River when his daughter's life is threatened during a prison riot. After the crisis is over, Tancredi seems to have a more strained relationship with her. When Sara asks him to review Lincoln's case on the day of his execution, he ultimately decides not to grant clemency, at the request of the Vice President. After paying for his daughter's bail when she is made an accessory to Michael Scofield's escape, he visits her at her apartment and she apologizes for the problems she has caused for him, but reasserts her belief that Lincoln is innocent, prompting him to take a second look at the Burrows case, and in a later episode he becomes convinced that his daughter is right. Sara soon finds her father dead. Although it looks like suicide, Sara suspects he was murdered, as he had become a threat to the conspiracy.
- Trenchcoat (played by Scott Jaeck) is another of Abruzzi's goons, who blackmails Nick into setting up Veronica for Abruzzi. He later kills Nick and his father after Nick lets Veronica go to Montana to find Terrence Steadman.
- Peter Tucci (played by Tracy Letts) is Caroline Reynold's attorney, who argues the case against exhuming Terrence Steadman's body, when Aldo slips evidence to Judge Kessler, suggesting Steadman's death was faked.
- Gregory White (played by Michael Bryan French) is a high-level administrator at the GATE corporation. Like all of his colleagues, he knows Cole Pfeiffer by reputation only, and does not question anything when T-Bag arrives claiming to be Pfeiffer and readily gives him the office he requested. White leaves for a trip with his wife, but returns after Andrew Blauner disappears. He continues to run the day-to-day activities at GATE until he spots Gretchen Morgan's gun in her bag. Gretchen holds the company hostage before he can call the police. He attempts to make a run for it, only to be gunned down by Gretchen.
- Shan Xing (played by Clint Jung) is an associate of Feng Huan. He was sent to get Scylla from Whistler. However, Whistler does not show up, as he was killed beforehand. When he returns emptyhanded, Feng kills him.

== Family tree ==
Burrows-Scofield family tree

Unnamed Parents	Frank Tancredi	Aldo Burrows	Christina Rose Scofield
Jacob Anton Ness; Poseidon	Sara Tancredi	Michael Scofield	Nika Volek (Note: Unconsummated sham marriage used to acquire green card.)	Adrian Rix	Lisa Rix	Lincoln Burrows	Veronica Donovan	Sofía Lugo	James Whistler
Michael "Mike" Scofield Jr.	Lincoln "L. J." Burrows Jr.	Sheba

== See also ==
- Breakout Kings
