= Allen (Prison Break) =

- Prison Break episode
- Michael plots his escape route
- Episode no.: Season 1 Episode 2
- Directed by: Michael Watkins
- Written by: Paul Scheuring
- Production code: 1AKJ01
- Original air date: August 29, 2005

Guest appearances
- Robert Knepper as Theodore "T-Bag" Bagwell; Rockmond Dunbar as C-Note; Stacy Keach as Henry Pope; Danny McCarthy as Daniel Hale; DuShon Monique Brown as Katie Welsh; Paul Adelstein as Paul Kellerman; Muse Watson as Charles Westmoreland; Ashley Boettcher as Garlic cutter's granddaughter; Mac Brandt as C.O. Mack Andrews; Kurt Caceres as Hector Avila; John Conrad as Garlic cutter's grandson; Brandon DeShazer as Prisoner; Keith Diamond as Tim Giles; Anthony Fleming as Trumpets; Camille Guaty as Maricruz Delgado; Brian Hamman as Jason "Maytag" Buchanan; Ora Jones as Wendy; Phillip Edward Van Lear as C.O. Louis Patterson; David Lively as Terrence Steadman; Mark Morettini as Rizzo Green; Adina Porter as Leticia Barris; Chavez Ravine as Ms. Simmons; Gianni Russo as Gavin Smallhouse; Al Sapienza as Philly Falzone; Christian Stolte as C.O. Keith Stolte; Wesley Walker as Aryan brother; Patricia Wettig as Garlic cutter

Episode chronology
← Previous "Pilot"	Next → "Cell Test"
- Prison Break (season 1)

"Allen" is the second episode of the first season of the television series Prison Break, which was first broadcast on television on August 29, 2005. The episode is the second to air alongside the Pilot episode as part of the two-part start of the series. "Allen" was written by series creator Paul Scheuring and directed by Michael Watkins. Robert Knepper makes his first appearance as Theodore "T-Bag" Bagwell, but was not yet billed as a regular character until the following episode, "Cell Test". Also, Marshall Allman, despite appearing in the credits, does not appear as L. J. Burrows.

The episode's title refers to the hex key that Michael makes from a screw, the key being named "Allen Schweitzer 11121147". Also in this episode, Veronica Donovan continues her investigation, on Michael's urging, as to who framed Lincoln Burrows. At the same time, Michael deals with an impending race riot in Fox River, which could hinder his escape plans.

== Plot ==
Michael Scofield and his cellmate, Fernando Sucre (Amaury Nolasco), face a lockdown in order for the guards to search cells for contraband. Sucre passes a shiv to Michael and tells him to throw it out of the cell, but while he's holding it, Bellick (Wade Williams) stops by, sees the knife, and sends Sucre to SHU. Warden Pope (Stacy Keach) calls off the search for Michael's cell, giving him a break because he wants Michael, a structural engineer, to help him construct a miniature Taj Mahal for his wife on their 40th anniversary. However, Bellick is determined to find dirt on Michael, enters his cell when the prisoners are away, and finds the name "Allen Schweitzer" on a notepad. Bellick runs the name on the prison database, but finds no one matching it.

Michael asks C-Note (Rockmond Dunbar), the inmate who procures items outside the prison with the help of friends, to obtain PUGNAc so that he can make regular trips to the infirmary, where Dr. Tancredi will give him insulin shots. Michael gives him money. Meanwhile, Sucre urges Stolte to let him call his fiancée, Maricruz (Camille Guaty), but is refused. Veronica (Robin Tunney) investigates who is framing Lincoln Burrows. Lincoln's trial defense lawyer gives her the videotape the prosecution used, which shows Lincoln shooting Terrence Steadman dead in a parking garage. Lincoln tells her he brought the gun to kill him, but never pulled the trigger, because the man was already murdered in his car. She attempts to talk to Crab Simmons (Tab Baker), who knows Lincoln is innocent but who didn't testify at his trial, but is told that he was killed of a faked drug overdose. She is contacted by Leticia Barris (Adina Porter), Crab's girlfriend, but as they meet, Leticia is spooked because Secret Service agents Kellerman (Paul Adelstein) and Hale (Danny McCarthy) are watching.

Back in Fox River, Michael begins to unscrew a bolt from a bleacher, but T-Bag (Robert Knepper) and his friends stop him. He doesn't want Scofield on "his" bleacher unless he will join in their upcoming racist battle against the black inmates, but Michael declines. Later, when he succeeds in unscrewing the bolt, T-Bag sees it and takes it from him, so he decides to join his gang in order to retrieve the bolt. However, C-Note sees him in T-bag's cell trying to persuade him to return the screw, and when he later confronts Scofield, he refuses to hand over the PUGNAc pills. Soon, everyone comes out of their cell for body count, and T-bag and the other white inmates begin the riot. Michael struggles with T-Bag's cellmate (Brian Hamman) and gets the bolt back. C-Note sees this and a black inmate, stepping in between them, stabs the cellmate several times; the wounded man dies in Michael's arms, covering him with blood. T-Bag believes Michael killed the cellmate, and decides that later he will have revenge on him. The fight stops through lockdown. Michael abrades the bolt on his cell floor until the sharpened end forms a hexagon-shaped key, big enough to unscrew the cell's toilet. It is shown that "Allen" is the screw, and "Schweitzer" is the toilet.

After the lockdown is finished, C-Note gives Michael the PUGNAc due to his belief that he fought on the side of the blacks, but tells him he will eventually find out what he's up to. Michael takes the pills. Dr. Tancredi (Sarah Wayne Callies) tests him for diabetes and the test is positive, so she believes he is diabetic. She gives him an insulin shot and shows that she likes him. Afterwards, Bellick orders Michael to a Prison Industries (PI) shed, where convicted mob boss John Abruzzi (Peter Stormare) attempts to extract information regarding the location of Fibonacci, so that he can have him assassinated before he testifies against Abruzzi's friends outside the prison. Abruzzi has his men cut off two of Michael's toes to try to get him to talk, but Michael refuses to.

== Production ==
=== Casting ===
Rockmond Dunbar, Robert Knepper and Paul Adelstein, who play C-Note, T-Bag and Paul Kellerman respectively made appearances in the episode, but are not yet billed as regulars until the next episode, except for C-Note, who'll be billed as a series regular from "The Rat". Marshall Allman, who plays L. J. Burrows does not appear in this episode. Anthony Starke, who plays Sebastian Balfour, Veronica Donovan's fiance was credited, but didn't make an appearance either. Making her first appearance is Patricia Wettig, who was credited as "Garlic cutter". Another first appearance includes Kurt Caceres, who plays Hector Avila, Fernando Sucre's cousin and a rival for the affections of Sucre's fiancée, Maricruz. Gunner McGrath, singer of the Chicago punk rock band Much the Same appears as an extra in this episode. He is seen wearing a black bandana on his head just prior to the outbreak of the riot.

=== Music ===
Artist	Song
Black Toast Music	Willing to Die
Black Toast Music	This Is War

== Reception ==
Alongside the Pilot, "Allen" was given viewing figures of 10.5 million, with a rating of 4.6 among the 18-46 age group, making it the seventh most watched show in that week. After its UK release, the episode received figures of under 1 million viewers, and didn't register as the top 30 most watched programming for the week it aired, according to BARB.
