= Prison Break season 1 =

Season of television series

Prison Break
- Season 1
- DVD cover
- No. of episodes: 22

Release
- Original network: Fox
- Original release: August 29, 2005 – May 15, 2006

Season chronology
- Next → Season 2

The first season of Prison Break, an American serial drama television series, commenced airing in the United States and Canada on August 29, 2005, on Mondays at 9:00 p.m. (EST) on Fox. Prison Break is produced by Adelstein-Parouse Productions, in association with Rat Entertainment, Original Film and 20th Century Fox Television. The season contains 22 episodes, and concluded on May 15, 2006. In addition to the 22 regular episodes, a special, "Behind the Walls", was aired on October 11, 2005.

Prison Break revolves around two brothers: Lincoln Burrows, who has been sentenced to death for a crime he did not commit, and his younger brother Michael Scofield, a genius who devises an elaborate plan to help him escape prison by deliberately joining him on the inside.

A total of ten actors received star billing in the first season, with numerous supporting roles. Filming took place mostly in and around the Chicago area; Fox River was represented by Joliet Prison, which had closed in 2002. Critical reviews of the first season were generally favorable. The first season was released on DVD in Region One as a six-disc boxed set under the title of Prison Break: Season One on August 8, 2006.

== Cast ==
=== Main characters ===
- Dominic Purcell as Lincoln Burrows
- Wentworth Miller as Michael Scofield
- Robin Tunney as Veronica Donovan
- Peter Stormare as John Abruzzi
- Amaury Nolasco as Fernando Sucre
- Marshall Allman as L.J. Burrows
- Wade Williams as Captain Brad Bellick
- Paul Adelstein as Secret Service Agent Paul Kellerman
- Robert Knepper as Theodore "T-Bag" Bagwell
- Rockmond Dunbar as Benjamin Miles "C-Note" Franklin
- Sarah Wayne Callies as Dr. Sara Tancredi

=== Recurring characters ===
- Stacy Keach as Warden Henry Pope
- Phillip Edward Van Lear as C.O. Louis Patterson
- Frank Grillo as Nick Savrinn
- Muse Watson as Charles Westmoreland
- Christian Stolte as C.O. Keith Stolte
- Mac Brandt as C.O. Mack Andrews
- Patricia Wettig as Vice President Caroline Reynolds
- Danny McCarthy as Secret Service Agent Daniel Hale
- DuShon Monique Brown as Nurse Katie Welsh
- Lane Garrison as David "Tweener" Apolskis
- Matt DeCaro as C.O. Roy Geary
- Michelle Forbes as Samantha Brinker
- Joe Nunez as Manche Sanchez
- Anthony Fleming as Trumpets
- Silas Weir Mitchell as Charles "Haywire" Patoshik
- Camille Guaty as Maricruz Delgado
- John Heard as Governor Frank Tancredi
- Peter J. Reineman as Gus Fiorello
- Jessalyn Gilsig as Lisa Rix
- Al Sapienza as Philly Falzone
- John Billingsley as Terrence Steadman
- Michael Gaston as Quinn
- Blaine Hogan as Seth "Cherry" Hoffner
- Philip Rayburn Smith as Adrian Rix
- Holly Valance as Nika Volek
- Robert Michael Vieau as Christopher Trokey
- Anthony Denison as Aldo Burrows
- Mike Jones as Darius Morgan
- K. K. Dodds as Susan Hollander

== Episodes ==
No. overall	No. in season	Title	Directed by	Written by	Original release date	Prod. code	U.S. viewers (millions)
1	1	"Pilot"	Brett Ratner	Paul Scheuring	August 29, 2005	1AKJ79	10.51
Chicago structural engineer Michael Scofield gets himself imprisoned in Fox River State Penitentiary as part of an elaborate plan to break out his brother, Lincoln Burrows, who is facing execution for the murder of the Vice President's brother, but denies the charge. Arriving at the prison, Scofield attracts the displeasure of C.O. head Brad Bellick and befriends his cellmate Fernando Sucre. He forces mob boss John Abruzzi to recruit him into the Prison Industries (P.I.) program by proving that he knows the location of Fibonacci, the only witness against Abruzzi. Scofield also meets Charles Westmoreland, who is believed to be D. B. Cooper; Dr. Sara Tancredi, who injects him with insulin because of his apparent diabetes; and Benjamin Miles "C-Note" Franklin, who can provide him with an insulin-blocking drug. Scofield agrees to help the warden, Henry Pope, construct a model of the Taj Mahal. Scofield reunites with his brother and reveals that his mysterious full-body tattoo contains the prison's blueprints; meanwhile, Lincoln's son, L.J. Burrows, is arrested for drug dealing. The Secret Service is revealed to be part of a conspiracy against Lincoln. Veronica Donovan, a lawyer and Lincoln's former girlfriend, begins to believe his innocence.
2	2	"Allen"	Michael W. Watkins	Paul Scheuring	August 29, 2005	1AKJ01	10.51
Sucre is put in solitary confinement for keeping illegal materials. Outdoors, Scofield searches for a specific bolt in a bench, but discovers it is the territory of rapist and white supremacist Theodore "T-Bag" Bagwell, who refuses to give him the bolt when he denies Bagwell's sexual advance. Tancredi schedules a test, questioning Scofield's diabetes diagnosis. A race riot starts between the prisoners, during which Scofield obtains the bolt and manipulates it to unscrew his cell's toilet from the wall. Bagwell watches as Scofield appears to kill his lover in the fight. Franklin agrees to give Scofield the insulin blockers, granting him continued access to the infirmary for insulin. Abruzzi's accomplice, Falzone, pushes him to find Fibonacci. Bellick searches Scofield's cell, but finds nothing. Burrows tells Donovan that he didn't pull the trigger, which can be seen in video evidence, and that his "victim" was already dead. Donovan visits a witness named Leticia Barris; Secret Service agent Paul Kellerman reports her activities to a woman in Montana. Sucre's fiancée, Maricruz Delgado, is upset that he cannot call her from solitary, and goes out with his cousin Hector. Scofield is abducted by Abruzzi's men and tortured for Fibonacci's location.
3	3	"Cell Test"	Brad Turner	Michael Pavone	September 5, 2005	1AKJ02	8.49
Burrows vows to make Abruzzi pay, but Scofield reminds him that he is needed for the escape. Sucre is released from solitary and Scofield tests his loyalty before revealing the plan to him, but Sucre decides to switch cells and stay out of trouble as he is already soon to be released. Abruzzi realizes that he must befriend Scofield in order to find Fibonacci. As Bagwell plans to lynch Scofield, Abruzzi attempts to reconcile with Scofield by having his men beat up Bagwell and have him sent to solitary. Scofield tells Abruzzi of his plan and he agrees to cooperate. L.J.'s probation officer forces him to visit Burrows, and the father and son become closer. Before Barris can sign a testimony for Donovan and Burrows, Kellerman and fellow agent Daniel Hale abduct her and kill her. Donovan decides to leave her fiancé, Sebastian Balfour. Bellick introduces Charles Patoshik, a psychotic inmate from the psychiatric ward, as Scofield's new cellmate.
4	4	"Cute Poison"	Matt Earl Beesley	Matt Olmstead	September 12, 2005	1AKJ03	9.15
Patoshik becomes obsessed with Scofield's tattoo, having deduced that it marks a path. Abruzzi pushes Scofield to take care of Patoshik. When Sucre discovers that Hector is making advances on Delgado, he decides to rejoin Scofield's escape, but is told that Patoshik is an obstacle. Scofield burns a hole through an infirmary drainpipe using chemicals provided by Abruzzi combined with Patoshik's toothpaste. After a scenario made by Scofield, the guards take Patoshik away and Sucre is returned. As Sucre causes a distraction in the block, Scofield manages to break through the wall behind the toilet, gaining access to maintenance areas. Donovan is denied support by specialist solicitors from Project Justice, but one, Nick Savrinn, steps up to help her personally. Kellerman and Hale learn that Scofield and Burrows are brothers and arrange for Scofield to be transferred to a different prison the following day.
5	5	"English, Fitz or Percy"	Randall Zisk	Zack Estrin	September 19, 2005	1AKJ04	7.96
Pope at first denies Kellerman and Hale's request to have Scofield transferred out of Fox River, but approves it when they threaten to reveal his illegitimate son's history to his wife. Westmoreland advises Scofield to write a petition which can cause his transfer to be postponed for weeks as it is considered in court, but the agents tell Pope to throw the petition away. Scofield plans to investigate the best route away from the prison: he fakes an escape attempt and sees from a roof that the police vehicle response covers English St and Percy Ave but not Fitz St. Pope changes his mind at the last moment as Scofield is about to be transferred, and proceeds to tell his wife the truth. Donovan and Savrinn realize that Burrows's tape is doctored; Donovan then finds it stolen and suspects Savrinn.
6	6	"Riots, Drills and the Devil (Part 1)"	Robert Mandel	Nick Santora	September 26, 2005	1AKJ05	8.55
Bagwell is released from solitary and meets his vulnerable new cellmate. Scofield forces a lockdown of the prison by breaking the air conditioning to give himself and Sucre more time to take down a wall with dangerous gas lines in it. This backfires when Bagwell starts a full-scale riot that leads the prisoners outside the block, and Bagwell and a captured C.O. discover the breach in Scofield's cell, allowing Bagwell to join the escape by threatening to report it. Tancredi's life is threatened when the sickbay prisoners join the uprising, but Scofield sees this via the cameras and rescues her through the ceiling ducts. Kellerman and Hale use a retired contact to recruit Turk, a Fox River inmate, to kill Burrows; he lures him into an empty location. Donovan distances herself from Savrinn, but he regains her trust when he makes the discovery that an anonymous call linked to Burrows's arrest came from Washington, D.C. rather than Chicago.
7	7	"Riots, Drills and the Devil (Part 2)"	Vern Gillum	Karyn Usher	October 3, 2005	1AKJ06	9.48
Governor of Illinois Frank Tancredi, Sara's father, arrives at the prison with an armed response to the riot, which is welcomed by Bellick but angers Pope. Scofield and Sara evade and fight off their attackers, and Sara escapes outdoors to the safety of sniper cover. She realizes that Scofield could not have accessed the infirmary easily. Sucre and Abruzzi slowly break through the wall, avoiding the gas lines via Scofield's precise template. Burrows manages to kill Turk in a fierce fight, but fails to find out who he was working for. As the riot ends, Bagwell kills the captive C.O. and pockets a picture of his daughter. Donovan and Savrinn arrive in Washington, D.C. and track the call down to a phone booth outside an empty building. The phone rings and a mysterious voice threatens their lives.
8	8	"The Old Head"	Jace Alexander	Monica Macer	October 24, 2005	1AKJ07	10.12
Scofield explains that the team must dig together through the floor of the guards' breakroom. Westmoreland has the unique privilege of access to the room, but refuses to join the scheme. The C.O.s attempt to hunt down who killed one of them during the riot. Westmoreland chooses silence when Bellick interrogates him, and Bellick kills his cat in revenge; Bagwell sets up his friend, Trokey, to take the blame when he does not do so willingly. Westmoreland grants Scofield's request and starts a fire in the breakroom, putting the blame on Bellick, and Scofield's team is called to do repairs as P.I. work. The team struggles to work with Bagwell. An attempt on Donovan and Savrinn's lives results in a neighbor's death, but the duo escape, presumed dead. Kellerman and Hale kill L.J.'s mother and stepfather and frame L.J., but he evades them. The woman they report to is revealed to be the Vice President whose brother was killed.
9	9	"Tweener"	Matt Earl Beesley	Paul Scheuring	October 31, 2005	1AKJ08	9.01
Bagwell's young cellmate begs for Scofield to intervene in the sexual violence he is suffering, but Scofield reluctantly refuses in order to preserve the escape, and so he hangs himself. Pickpocket David "Tweener" Apolskis is another young new inmate harassed by Bagwell; Scofield forces Bagwell to stay away from him. The team's activities make Franklin suspicious. Bellick informs Abruzzi that Falzone has broken their agreement to bribe him for Abruzzi's P.I. privileges, and Abruzzi realizes that Falzone is trying to replace him, given his failure to track down Fibonacci. Abruzzi takes his revenge on his replacement, Fiorello, by gouging out his eye. Bellick gives the breakroom repair job to Fiorello's team, threatening the escape. Tancredi contacts Scofield's psychiatrist and learns that he has low latent inhibition, compelling him to help others and augmenting his intelligence. Donovan and Savrinn take refuge in Savrinn's father's house in the woods, and learn from the widow of Terrence Steadman, the Vice President's brother, that his commercial partners could be behind his death. L.J. seeks safety with Donovan on Lincoln's advice, as Kellerman and Hale continue their pursuit of him.
10	10	"Sleight of Hand"	Dwight H. Little	Nick Santora	November 7, 2005	1AKJ09	8.06
Franklin convinces Fiorello to let him work in the breakroom and discovers the hole. Abruzzi persuades Scofield and Falzone to meet. Scofield tells Falzone how he found Fibonacci, bypassing witness protection, and demands that Abruzzi be returned to power along with the P.I. funding. Abruzzi finally forces Scofield to give away Fibonacci's address by revealing his knowledge on Donovan; Falzone rewards him by reinstating him and casting Fiorello out. Falzone goes with his men to kill Fibonacci, but police ambush him at the supposed address in Canada, as Scofield and Abruzzi were conspiring to set him up. The escape team resumes their digging, now forced to include Franklin. Scofield and Tancredi's relationship grows closer. Vice President Caroline Reynolds informs Kellerman that "The Company" has sent its own operative, Quinn, to take over their work. Quinn tracks down Donovan by killing Balfour and impersonating him.
11	11	"And Then There Were 7"	Jesús Salvador Treviño	Zack Estrin	November 14, 2005	1AKJ10	9.58
Scofield is visited by his wife, Nika Volek, who smuggles in a credit card. Tancredi is hurt; Bellick realizes that Volek is a prostitute and forces her to talk. She tells him about the card, stating that she and Scofield are in a tenuous green card marriage. Scofield reveals that the card is a disguised door keycard and uses it to gain access to the clothing he wore on his arrival, from which he retrieves a recording device. He realizes that a crucial gold watch has been stolen from the storage by C.O. Roy Geary. Westmoreland hears that his daughter has terminal cancer and resolves to escape to see her, and so admits to Scofield that he is D.B. Cooper, proving that he owns Cooper's rumored fortune. Having persuaded Apolskis to steal the watch back, Scofield rigs the recording device with it and determines the timing of the guards' shifts around the final site of the escape: the infirmary window. Quinn captures Donovan, L.J. and Savrinn, who is critically shot, but the trio escape after trapping him in a well. Kellerman and Hale arrive, and spitefully leave their failed competitor to die.
12	12	"Odd Man Out"	Bobby Roth	Karyn Usher	November 21, 2005	1AKJ11	10.08
Scofield tells the team that the escape's timing requires one member to be left behind; they attempt to exclude Bagwell, but he informs them that his cousin outside knows of the plan and will alert the authorities if they escape without him. Abruzzi's men track down Bagwell's cousin, and the man and his young child are killed in a struggle. Abruzzi feels guilt for his crimes but decides to take care of Bagwell anyway. Bagwell, confronted, invokes their Christian beliefs and swears to atone for his mistakes as Abruzzi has; Abruzzi spares him, giving him a chance to slit Abruzzi's throat. Burrows is forced to assault a suspicious Geary to distract him from the dig and is taken away by the guards. Delgado informs Sucre that she is pregnant, and he tells her that he is getting out soon. Bellick forces Apolskis to spy on Scofield to avoid solitary for his theft from Geary. Savrinn is treated at a hospital; Hale feels disillusioned with Kellerman's violent work and plans to escape with his family.
13	13	"End of the Tunnel"	Sanford Bookstaver	Paul Scheuring	November 28, 2005	1AKJ12	12.18
Donovan meets with Hale, who discloses that Steadman is alive. Kellerman arrives and kills Hale for his betrayal, but Donovan narrowly avoids detection. Tancredi sends Abruzzi away on a medical helicopter. Burrows is beaten by the guards and thrown in solitary, and Pope denies Scofield's request to visit him there. Scofield decides to postpone the escape, but the others push to leave without Burrows. Franklin calls his brother-in-law, the only member of his family who knows he is in prison, to plan his movements after the escape. Scofield manages to send Burrows a drug with a message detailing when to take it. The team once again sabotages the breakroom, causing Bellick to order them to work into the night, when they can make their escape. When the time comes, Burrows takes the drug and is taken sick to the infirmary. The team proceeds to the room underneath the infirmary, but they realize that the drainpipe Scofield burned a hole in has been replaced, and are forced to retreat.
14	14	"The Rat"	Kevin Hooks	Matt Olmstead	March 20, 2006	1AKJ13	9.28
The team return to their cells without arousing suspicion. Donovan and Savrinn arrange for an appellate court to present their findings. Tancredi is unable to convince her father of Lincoln's innocence, as he rejects her lifestyle. Scofield learns from Westmoreland that Lincoln's execution will be delayed for weeks if the electric chair is malfunctioning, a conversation that is heard by Apolskis. Scofield exploits a chewing rat to cut the power to the chair. In court, Donovan has no evidence for what she saw, and the government attorney counters with documents certifying that no agents named Kellerman or Hale have ever worked with the Secret Service. Bellick forces Apolskis to share what he has heard and bullies an electrician into fixing the chair without the delay of the approval process. Lincoln surrenders to his fate, speaking to L.J. on the phone and saying his goodbyes to Scofield and Donovan, who has failed at the appeal. He takes his place on the chair.
15	15	"By the Skin and the Teeth"	Fred Gerber	Nick Santora	March 27, 2006	1AKJ14	10.07
Lincoln is surprised to see a specific man in the watching room. The judge calls and halts the execution. Lincoln tells Scofield that the man he saw was their presumed-dead father. The judge states that he has received a document showing a discrepancy in the coroner's reports and orders an exhumation of Steadman's body. Scofield formulates a new plan to reach the infirmary through the asylum. He gets a guard uniform from Sucre's cousin, Manche Sanchez, who does laundry work. At night, he enters the yard from a hatch in disguise and finds the way through the asylum, but burns his back while returning. Bellick accuses Sucre of burning Scofield, while Tancredi finds C.O. uniform fabric in the burn wound. The test on Steadman's body surprisingly shows a dental match, confirming him dead. Cameras show that Lincoln's father brought the new report; he is a member of The Company and Lincoln was not set up at random. Scofield realizes that a key part of his tattoo has burned away.
16	16	"Brother's Keeper"	Greg Yaitanes	Zack Estrin	April 3, 2006	1AKJ15	8.10
Three years ago, Scofield was living a comfortable life while Burrows was saddled with debt. His debts were paid by a man who forced him to kill Steadman in exchange; after his arrest, Scofield blamed him for not using his share of their mother's life insurance funds properly and ruining his life. Donovan revealed to Scofield that there had been no life insurance, and Burrows had borrowed to secretly support Scofield and afford him his engineering education. Feeling responsible for his brother's position, Scofield began to plan the breakout. Tancredi, a morphine addict, met Bellick at a rehabilitation group and was persuaded to work at Fox River. Sucre attempted to rob a store to buy Delgado a suiting ring and was arrested when Hector called the police. Franklin was a sergeant in the Army deployed in Kuwait, and reported prisoner torture, but he was dishonorably discharged in a coverup operation, keeping this a secret from his family, and arrested for transporting illegal goods to support them. Bagwell was in a relationship with a widow with two children, who had him arrested when she saw that he was wanted for child rape and murder. He promised to find her when he got out.
17	17	"J-Cat"	Guy Ferland	Karyn Usher	April 10, 2006	1AKJ16	8.12
Tancredi reports her discovery of the uniform fabric to Pope, who sends Scofield to solitary after he refuses to talk. Scofield apparently becomes mentally ill. Bellick decides to hire more professional workers for the breakroom and the team realizes that the hole must be carpeted over immediately. Since Sucre's cell has the only way out into the breakroom, he carries out this task, but is then caught in the courtyard. Aided by Bagwell, Sucre weakly justifies his actions, and is also put in solitary. Apolskis tells Bellick that the team is planning something related to the carpet, but Bellick finds nothing wrong with it, so he switches Apolskis to a cell with the violent Avocado. Scofield is taken to the psychiatric ward, where he is revealed to be healthy, as he planned to consult Patoshik about his tattoo. Patoshik does not remember the missing design. Meanwhile, Donovan's group recovers Quinn's cell phone to find clues. Alone in the well, L.J. sees Kellerman's alias "O. Kravecki" carved into the wall by Quinn. He runs away and ambushes Kellerman in his home, but is arrested.
18	18	"Bluff"	Jace Alexander	Nick Santora & Karyn Usher	April 17, 2006	1AKJ17	8.18
Scofield stops Patoshik from taking his medication, causing him to remember the tattoo. Geary decides to sell Scofield and Sucre's cell to the highest bidder, forcing the team to raise money to keep the escape route. Franklin tries with other black inmates, but one named Trumpets accuses him of betraying them by becoming too close with white inmates, and they beat him up. Bagwell wins the money through gambling, but Geary pockets it and withholds the cell. Sucre tells Sanchez about their plan and promises to include him if he helps the team. Having reconstructed his tattoo, Scofield tells Pope that it was Geary who burnt him, an accusation the team work to evidence; Geary is fired. Savrinn is approached by a man who instructs him to keep watching Donovan, who now also represents L.J. Lincoln is granted a visit to L.J.; as he is transferred, his vehicle is attacked on the road.
19	19	"The Key"	Sergio Mimica-Gezzan	Story by : Paul Scheuring; Teleplay by : Zack Estrin & Matt Olmstead	April 24, 2006	1AKJ18	8.63
Lincoln's father, Aldo Burrows, arrives and saves him from Kellerman's assault on the road. Aldo tells Lincoln that The Company, which he formerly worked for, controls the U.S. government, and that it used Lincoln to punish him after he defied it. The police and Kellerman pursue the pair; Lincoln turns himself in to evade Kellerman as Aldo escapes. When Scofield needs access through the infirmary door, Apolskis, raped by Avocado, refuses to steal the key for Scofield, but Volek lures Tancredi into conversation and steals her key. Scofield makes a copy and returns it to the infirmary, but Tancredi notices the theft and changes the lock. Apolskis slashes Avocado in the genitals. Abruzzi returns healed, frightening Bagwell, but he makes peace with Bagwell and prepares an airplane escape for the team. Abruzzi is also revealed to be the man instructing Savrinn to watch Donovan. Scofield includes Apolskis in the plan, but Apolskis reports it to Bellick, who finds the hole in the breakroom.
20	20	"Tonight"	Bobby Roth	Zack Estrin	May 1, 2006	1AKJ19	8.54
Westmoreland duels Bellick in the breakroom and traps him in the hole, but is gravely wounded. As a result, Scofield moves the escape forward to that night. The team alter their scents to throw off police dogs, Apolskis included, despite his betrayal being known. Franklin is tasked with bringing detergent from the kitchen, where he defeats Trumpets in a fight. Scofield finishes the Taj Mahal model for Pope, who allows him in return to visit Burrows in solitary. Scofield reveals his plan to Tancredi, begging her to leave the infirmary door unlocked when she leaves for the night. He emphasizes Lincoln's innocence even if he himself is an unworthy man to her. Abruzzi warns Savrinn to deliver Donovan on time; as Donovan prepares to fly to Montana for a clue, Savrinn pulls a gun on her. Vice President Reynolds fails to become her party's presidential candidate. The model Taj Mahal collapses, causing Pope to summon Scofield, who pulls a knife on him.
21	21	"Go"	Dean White	Matt Olmstead	May 8, 2006	1AKJ20	9.13
Scofield forces Pope to order Lincoln to be transferred to the infirmary, and locks him in a closet. Trumpets tries unsuccessfully to find and kill Franklin. The team bleach their shirts and begin their second escape attempt, silencing Bellick along the way. Scofield dresses in Bellick's uniform, and the others use their whitened shirts to blend in in the psychiatric ward. They find that Tancredi has left the infirmary door open. Patoshik follows the team and forces them to include him with a threat of raising the alarm. Westmoreland succumbs to his wound after telling Scofield the secret location of his 5 million dollars, but Apolskis, Bagwell, Franklin and Sanchez hear this. Breaking out of the window, the nine climb along a cable one by one, but Sanchez, going last, breaks the cable and falls because of his weight. Savrinn decides to release Donovan to catch her flight to Montana, causing Abruzzi's ally to kill him and his father. The Company decides to no longer work with Vice President Reynolds. Pope is rescued and raises the alarm.
22	22	"Flight"	Kevin Hooks	Paul Scheuring	May 15, 2006	1AKJ21	10.24
The eight escapees (Scofield, Burrows, Sucre, Abruzzi, Bagwell, Franklin, Apolskis and Patoshik) run to a van on Fitz St provided by Abruzzi's men and leave Patoshik behind as they drive it away. Fearful of Abruzzi, Bagwell handcuffs his left hand to Scofield and swallows the key to prevent his own killing. They leave the van behind and continue on foot. Scofield forces Apolskis to break away alone because of his betrayal, and Abruzzi cuts off Bagwell's hand to free Scofield. With Bagwell incapacitated, they run towards the airstrip. The President dies, supposedly as a result of a heart attack; Reynolds quickly swears in as President, regaining The Company's faith. Police find Tancredi suffering a morphine overdose in her apartment. Donovan encounters the toothless Steadman in a mansion in Montana. Apolskis passes the police checkpoint inside an animal transfer vehicle, while Patoshik escapes by toy bicycle, and Bagwell runs, carrying his hand. The other escapees arrive at the airstrip just as their plane leaves. As police approach, they run into the night.

== Production ==
=== Crew ===
The season was produced by Adelstein-Parouse Productions, in association with Original Television and 20th Century Fox Television. The executive producers were creator Paul Scheuring, Marty Adelstein, Neal H. Moritz, Dawn Parouse, Brett Ratner and Matt Olmstead. The staff writers were Scheuring, co-executive producers Nick Santora and Zack Estrin, supervising producer Karyn Usher and Olmstead. The regular director throughout the season was Bobby Roth; additional directors were Jace Alexander, Matt Earl Beesley and Dwight H. Little. Its incidental music was composed by Ramin Djawadi.

=== Filming ===
Most of the first season of the series was filmed on location in and around Chicago. After it was closed down in 2002, Joliet Prison became the set of Prison Break in 2005, standing in as Fox River State Penitentiary on screen. Scenes set in Lincoln's cell, the infirmary and the prison yard were all shot on location at the prison. Lincoln's cell is the same one in which John Wayne Gacy was incarcerated. Most of the production crew refused to enter the cell, thinking that it was haunted. Other sets were built at the prison, including the cell blocks that housed the general prison population; these blocks had three tiers of cells (as opposed to the real cell block's two) and had cells much larger than real cells to allow more space for the actors and cameras. Exterior scenes were filmed in areas around Chicago, Woodstock, and Joliet in Illinois. Other locations included O'Hare International Airport in Chicago and Toronto, Ontario in Canada. Prison Break spent $2 million per episode in the state of Illinois, which cost them a total of $24 million in 2005.

== Release ==
=== Critical reception ===
The season has a 77% rating on Rotten Tomatoes, with the site's consensus stating: "Prison Break is confident pulp with a crackerjack premise that spreads thinly enough to smooth over the show's more lunkheaded flourishes." Metacritic gave the season a score—a weighted average based on the impressions of a select 32 critical reviews—of 65. Based on its strong opening, The New York Times dubbed Prison Break "more intriguing than most of the new network series, and ... one of the most original" and a "suspenseful thriller", complementing its "authentic look". Entertainment Weekly called it an "original drama", noting the show's "edge-of-the-seat action". The Washington Post criticized the show for its "somber pretentiousness" and "uniformly overwrought [performances]".

=== Ratings ===
The two-hour pilot episode garnered approximately 10.5 million viewers, giving Fox its "best summertime Monday numbers since episodes of Melrose Place and Ally McBeal aired there in September 1998." The show's first season attracted an average audience of 10 million viewers each week, with "End of the Tunnel" reaching 12 million viewers, and led the debuts of television in the 2005 American fall season. Prison Break was originally planned for a 13-episode run, but was extended to include an extra nine episodes due to its popularity.

== Home media release ==
Prison Break: The Complete First Season
Set details		Special features
22 episodes; 6-disc set; 1.78:1 aspect ratio; Subtitles: English, Spanish, French; English (Dolby Digital 5.1 Surround); Audio commentaries: "Pilot"; "Cute Poison"; "Riots, Drills and the Devil, Part 1"; "Riots, Drills and the Devil, Part 2"; "Odd Man Out"; "Brother's Keeper"		Deleted scenes; The Making of Prison Break; If These Walls Could Speak: Profile of the Joliet Correctional Center featurette; Beyond the Ink tattoo featurette; Fox Movie Channel Presents Making a Scene; TV Spots
Release dates
United States; Canada	United Kingdom	Australia; New Zealand
August 8, 2006	September 18, 2006	September 12, 2006
