= Riots, Drills and the Devil =

- Prison Break episodes
- Michael has the drawing of the devil from his tattoo to break through a thick wall to the pipes behind it.
- Episode nos.: Season 1 Episodes 6 & 7
- Directed by: Robert Mandel (Part 1); Vern Gillum (Part 2)
- Written by: Nick Santora (Part 1); Karyn Usher (Part 2)
- Production codes: 1AKJ05 (Part 1); 1AKJ06 (Part 2)
- Original air dates: September 26, 2005 (Part 1); October 03, 2005 (Part 2)

Guest appearances
- Muse Watson as Charles Westmoreland; Frank Grillo as Nick Savrinn; John Heard as Frank Tancredi; Stacy Keach as Henry Pope; Danny McCarthy as Daniel Hale; Matt DeCaro as Roy Geary; James Alfred as Sniper; Kwame Amoaku as Stroker; Mac Brandt as Mack Andrews; Michael Cudlitz as Bob Hudson; Brad Fleischer as Theo; Anthony Fleming as Trumpets; Jessalyn Gilsig as Lisa Rix; Blaine Hogan as Seth "Cherry" Hoffner; Howie Johnson as Lucasz; Ora Jones as Wendy; Phillip Edward Van Lear as Louis Patterson; David McCoy as Adam Diamond; Braden Morat as Captain; Mark Morettini as Rizzo Green; Paul Noble as Eric Diamond; Morocco Omari as Ron; Peter J. Reineman as Gus Fiorello; Daniel Allen Ruben as Inmate; Philip Rayburn Smith as Adrian Rix; Michael Stoyanov as Fletch; Daniel J. Travanti as President Richard Mills; John Turk as Turk; Robert Michael Vieau as Christopher Trokey; David Dino Wells Jr. as Inmate; Cedric Young as Choppy

Episode chronology
← Previous "English, Fitz or Percy"	Next → "The Old Head"
- Prison Break (season 1)

"Riots, Drills and the Devil" is the sixth and seventh episode of the first season of the television series Prison Break. A two-part episode, the first part constitutes the sixth episode of the series and the second part constitutes the seventh. They were aired separately in the United States on September 26, 2005, and October 3, 2005, consecutively. The first part of "Riots, Drills and the Devil" was written by Nick Santora and directed by Robert Mandel with the second part being written by Karyn Usher and directed by Vern Gillum.

In this two-part episode, in order to keep his escape plan on schedule, protagonist Michael Scofield deliberately attempts to get his wing locked down which results in a riot in the prison, supposedly giving him enough time to drill through a wall without having to worry about cell counts. Also, two people discover the escape plan; an inmate is ordered to kill Lincoln Burrows; Veronica and Savrinn find a lead in the case; and Dr. Sara Tancredi is trapped by some of the rioting prisoners.

== Plot ==
=== Part 1 ===
Since Scofield's transfer was cancelled, the woman in Montana tells Kellerman to take care of Burrows quickly. He has an informant call an inmate in Fox River to kill Lincoln. The only form of identification of the inmate is an elastic bracelet. Veronica (Robin Tunney) avoids Nick Savrinn, until she realises that he is trying to help her all along, when he hears that the anonymous phone call to arrest Lincoln came from Washington, D.C. Meanwhile, Michael (Wentworth Miller) realizes that to complete a digging job inside the walls to some pipes, he needs to spend a good block of time there, which has been proving difficult as he has to keep coming back to his cell to make count. After explaining this to Sucre (Amaury Nolasco), he is told that the only time count doesn't take place is during a lockdown. Michael manages to disable the prison's air conditioning. T-Bag (Robert Knepper) returns from the infirmary, where he is given a new cell mate, Seth. Since the A/C is off, the inmates suffer in the heat, leading T-Bag to start a fight with Geary, who then initiates a lockdown while some of the prisoners are out of their cells. The prisoners riot and break into the prison cell control room, in which T-Bag opens all the cells and then finds a set of keys, giving him and the rioters access to the entire prison.

When news of the riot reaches the sick bay, the prisoners there also riot. After taking out the guard, they trap Dr. Tancredi (Sarah Wayne Callies) in the adjacent room. Michael uses a tracing of a devil from his tattoo to provide the coordinates (calculated using Hooke's law, also referred in this episode as hooker's law) needed to collapse part of the wall. This is vital to his escape plan as the wall prevents the team from entering a pipe that will take them to the infirmary. Meanwhile, after Lincoln is ambushed by T-Bag and his men, he holds new CO Bob Hudson hostage, who tries to escape, but T-Bag takes him to Michael's cell, where he learns of the escape plan, and blackmails Abruzzi (Peter Stormare) into getting in on the plan. Outside, the COs plan on stopping the riot, where Pope receives a call from Governor Tancredi, who is coming to Fox River.

Michael soon notices Dr. Tancredi's plight on CCTV and goes to rescue her through an air duct. Meanwhile, Charles Westmoreland stumbles upon a battered Lincoln and alerts him of the situation. A distraught Lincoln demands to know where Michael is. When Westmoreland is unable to answer, another prisoner named Turk steps forth to lead Lincoln to Michael, but it is revealed he is the inmate ordered to kill Lincoln.

=== Part 2 ===
Turk misleads Lincoln, by sending him into a secluded area, where he attempts to kill him. However, after the two men struggle, Lincoln pushes Turk over the edge, where he soon dies. Back in Michael's and Sucre's cell, T-Bag is keeping an eye on CO Hudson, who knows of the escape plan. Abruzzi enters the hole and helps Sucre with breaking down the wall. Sucre, a devout Roman Catholic, struggles with drilling through a depiction of the devil. Also adding to the dilemma is the fact that gas pipes lie behind the wall, and that drilling in the wrong place may cause a fatal explosion. However, together they are eventually both able to drill strategically placed holes and manages to break it down to see the pipe on the other side.

Sara is still trapped in the room, where the rioters almost break through, and try to set fire to it, where Michael manages to arrive through the vents and rescues her from them. However, the rioters follow her and Michael, who try to evade them. Sara asks how Michael knows about the pipes and he replies by saying that he has had PI duties to clean up toxic mold in the pipes. Soon, Michael is able to knock out one of the leading inmates and rush to an exit. However, when they arrive, a sniper, sent by Govorner Tancredi, who is adamant to do what it takes to rescue his daughter, aims at him. Michael quickly ducks as the pursuing inmates are fired at and Sara reunites with her father.

Veronica and Nick arrive in Washington, D.C., and receive the address from the placed phone call, a payphone. The payphone is next to the building of the company the Vice President uses. The phone rings and Veronica answers it. The caller tells them that they are dead. In a panic, Veronica and Nick run away from the payphone. Michael returns to gen-pop and reunites with Lincoln before heavily armed SORT teams invade the prison and force the inmates back to their cells. In Michael's cell, the team discuss what to do with Hudson. Michael, Lincoln and Sucre want to keep him alive. However, as he leaves, T-Bag kills him anyway, stabbing him in the stomach and throwing him down from the second level. Later, Sara asks a colleague why PI was ordered to clean up the toxic mold. The colleague replies that PI has never done such a job, which tells Sara that Michael's story was a lie. In the end, the prison is returned to normal and Michael can continue with his escape plan.

== Production ==
This episode was filmed in Chicago, Illinois, and Joliet, Illinois, in August 2005 where it was summer. The weather condition was reflected in the dialogue "hottest April on record", and the make-up and wardrobe of the characters. The song "Nine Thou" by Styles Of Beyond begins at the end of "Riots, Drills and the Devil (Part 1)" when Lincoln attacks T-Bag and is also used in the opening of the episode "Riots, Drills and the Devil (Part 2)".

=== Cast notes ===
In the first part of the episode, Marshall Allman (L. J. Burrows) does not make an appearance. Robert Knepper (T-Bag) returns after a two episode gap, in which his character recovers from his brutal beating in "Cell Test". The second part of this episode is the first episode in the series in which regular cast member Paul Adelstein (Agent Kellerman) does not appear. John Turk guests stars as Turk, the inmate ordered to kill Burrows. Also, making their first appearances are Matt DeCaro as CO Roy Geary, and John Heard as Frank Tancredi.

== Reception ==
Reviewstream.com reviewed the second part of the episode as "an absolutely fantastic episode", calling it "really nerve wrecking [sic], romantic", praising Michael's role in risking his plan to save Dr. Tancredi, as well as the prediction that "things are going to get uglier from now on, and their plan would not work". They also called the second part, "one of the best writing in television so far". Both the second, and first parts were rated 10 out of 10.

As far as US ratings go, the two episodes performed better than the previous two. The first part was given a rating of 3.0, and viewing figures of 8.55 million. The second part was given a greater increase, with a rating of 3.4 and figures of 9.48 million viewers. Both episodes were the ranked the 43rd and 39th most watched show on American television for the two weeks. In the UK, the first part was given total figures of 2.04 million viewers, and the second part achieved a total of 2.15 million viewers, an increase from the first part. Both episodes were respectively ranked the 10th and 9th most viewed programme on Five for the two weeks.
