= English, Fitz or Percy =

- Prison Break episode
- Episode no.: Season 1 Episode 5
- Directed by: Randall Zisk
- Written by: Zack Estrin
- Production code: 1AKJ04
- Original air date: September 29, 2005

Guest appearances
- Patricia Wettig as Caroline Reynolds; Stacy Keach as Henry Pope; Mac Brandt as Mack Andrews; DuShon Monique Brown as Katie Welsh; Deanna Dunagan as Judy Pope; Frank Grillo as Nick Savrinn; Max Kirsch as Young Lincoln; Phillip Edward Van Lear as Louis Patterson; Danny McCarthy as Daniel Hale; Dylan Minnette as Young Michael; Joe Minoso as Chaz Fink; Peter J. Reineman as Gus Fiorello; Christian Stolte as Keith Stolte; Jennifer Joan Taylor as Becky

Episode chronology
← Previous "Cute Poison"	Next → "Riots, Drills and the Devil"
- Prison Break (season 1)

"English, Fitz or Percy" is the fifth episode of the first season of the television series Prison Break. The episode was broadcast on September 19, 2005 in the United States. It is directed by Randall Zisk and credited to writer Zack Estrin. "English, Fitz or Percy" features another part of Michael Scofield's escape plan, involving the street names of the ones that are outside the infirmary section of the prison. Also, the case to exonerate Lincoln Burrows hits another twist, and agents Kellerman and Hale blackmail Warden Pope to have Scofield transferred out of Fox River State Penitentiary.

== Plot ==
Michael Scofield tells the team in his escape plan, now consisting of Sucre (Amaury Nolasco), Lincoln (Dominic Purcell), and John Abruzzi (Peter Stormare), that they have to take out either English, Fitz or Percy, the three names on his forearm from the tattoo. Meanwhile, Secret Service Agent Kellerman (Paul Adelstein) and Hale pay a visit to Warden Pope regarding Scofield's transfer. Pope denies the request, where the agents proceed in blackmailing him concerning the affair he had from Toledo, and threaten to tell his wife about this. Pope tells the agents that his wife already knows about the affair, but the agents know he did not tell her the whole truth. She knows nothing of the son he had there. Michael returns to his cell to find Pope, who tells him that some higher power wants him transferred out of Fox River. Michael plans to take the advice from Charles Westmoreland and get a transfer block letter, telling Pope he has sinusitis, to keep him in at least a month yet. However, Kellerman and Hale continue blackmailing him, and tells him to drop the paperwork, which he reluctantly does. Nick Savrinn and Veronica Donovan continue to try to find legal grounds to exonerate Lincoln. From the copy of the videotape of the murder, an expert believes that the gunshot sound was faked, but needs the original. However, they find it was destroyed in a "freak accident". When they return to Veronica's home, they find the copy has been stolen, and she suspects Nick may be involved.

Michael tells Abruzzi to get him a key to the warden's office. Abruzzi does this by melting toothbrushes into a stolen mold. Towards the end of the day, Michael, while constructing the model of the Taj Mahal, tells Pope that the structure will collapse if he does not remain there to hold the piece as the glue sets. Warden Pope leaves for the day and Michael immediately uses the replica key to leave the office through the back door and reach the roof. However, during count, Bellick realises a missing Scofield, and alerts the authorities. However, that was Michael's plan all along. English, Fitz and Percy are the names of the only three streets that lead to the prison and when the police cars come in response to the alarm, he learns that the cops only take English and Percy, leaving Fitz wide open. Now that he knows which road to take, he returns to the Warden's office, where he is found with the replica of the Taj Mahal. Nobody suspects anything. However, Pope says that Michael will be transferred, to Michael's dismay. The next morning, Michael is about to be transferred, but Pope decides to cancel it. Before Kellerman could get there, Pope admits to his wife the son he had during his affair. In another place, a mysterious woman tells the secret service to deal with Lincoln rather than Michael as he is Lincoln's weakness.

== Production ==
Marshall Allman, who played Lincoln "L. J." Burrows Jr. and Robert Knepper, who played Theodore "T-Bag" Bagwell were credited in the opening credits of the episode, but neither made an appearance. The music used in the scene where Michael is being escorted out of the prison is "Orange Sky" by Alexi Murdoch, which is subsequently used in The O.C. episode "The Homecoming", where it plays as Ryan has just finished visiting his brother, Trey, in prison.

== Reception ==
After its release in the United States, the ratings declined since the performance of the previous episode "Cute Poison", with a rating of 3.8/9 to the 18-49 demographic, and figures of approximately 7.9 million viewers. In the UK, it with the seventeenth most seen programme for the week it aired on Five, with total viewing figures of 1.75 million, which went down slightly since "Cute Poison".
