= Cute Poison =

- Prison Break episode
- Haywire, Michael's new cell mate
- Episode no.: Season 1 Episode 4
- Directed by: Matt Earl Beesley
- Written by: Matt Olmstead
- Production code: 1AKJ03
- Original air date: September 12, 2005

Guest appearances
- Frank Grillo as Nick Savrinn; Danny McCarthy as Daniel Hale; Camille Guaty as Maricruz Delgado; Patricia Wettig as Caroline Reynolds; Stacy Keach as Henry Pope; Silas Weir Mitchell as Charles "Haywire" Patoshik; Kurt Caceres as Hector Avila; Mac Brandt as Mack Andrews; Deanna Dunagan as Judy Pope; John Judd as Benjamin Forsik; Kevin Kelly as Officer Weston; Jennifer Kern as Allison Hale; Phillip Edward Van Lear as Louis Patterson; Haley Nero as Hale's daughter; Brandon Tyler Russell as Hale's son; Christian Stolte as Keith Stolte; Jennifer Joan Taylor as Becky; Michael Vieau as Christopher Trokey; Jason Wells as Bo; Cedric Young as Choppy

Episode chronology
← Previous "Cell Test"	Next → "English, Fitz or Percy"
- Prison Break (season 1)

"Cute Poison" is the fourth episode of the first season of the television series Prison Break. It first aired on September 12, 2005, in the United States. The episode is directed by Matt Earl Beesley and written by series producer Matt Olmstead. The words "Cute Poison", one of Michael Scofield's (Wentworth Miller) tattoos, are a mnemonic for CuSO_{4} (copper sulfate) and H_{3}PO_{4} (phosphoric acid), the two ingredients needed for the third part in his escape plan. Also, his new cellmate Charles "Haywire" Patoshik (Silas Weir Mitchell) notices Michael's tattoos and may expose his escape plans. Michael has to stop him and get his old cellmate, Fernando Sucre (Amaury Nolasco), back.

== Plot ==
Michael is three days behind on his plan to free his brother, particularly with his new insomniac cellmate, Haywire (Silas Weir Mitchell), whom he witnesses taking some tablets to stay lucid, but escape when the doctors leave, describing them as "invisible handcuffs". He then notices Michael's tattoo and sees the hidden "maze" in it.

Meanwhile, Veronica Donovan (Robin Tunney) meets with Nick Savrinn (Frank Grillo) from "Project Justice", who wants to assist. They question Lincoln regarding the evidence, which he insists was planted. Sucre (Amaury Nolasco) is visited by his cousin, Hector Avila (Kurt Caceres), who tells him that Maricruz (Camille Guaty) is with him now. He eventually gets hold of Maricruz, and learns that Hector told her lies to get her not to come. With this new development, Sucre urges Michael to get him back into the cell.

Michael manages to get hold of two chemicals and uses them to corrode a pipe underneath the infirmary as part of the escape plan. He returns to his cell and notices Haywire has drawn his entire tattoo and ponders the pathway. Michael purposely injures himself to get the officers to take Haywire away before the plan is exposed. Sucre gets transferred back to Michael's cell and continues the plan. Agent Kellerman (Paul Adelstein) suspects that Scofield may try to break Lincoln out and orders to transfer Scofield out the very next day.

== Production ==
Robert Knepper, who plays T-Bag, and Marshall Allman, who plays L. J. Burrows, were credited for this episode. However, neither made an appearance. Sucre's song to start the ruckus that Michael needed to knock down a wall was "Eres tú" by the Spanish band "Mocedades". The song was chosen as Spain's entry in the 1973 Eurovision Song Contest and won 2nd place.

== Broadcast and reception ==
The episode was released as "Quimicos", which means "Chemicals" in Latin America. The ratings increased since the previous episode "Cell Test", with a 4.5 rating from the 18–49 demographics, and viewing figures of 9.12 million, placing it the third most-watched show of the day. Since the release on Five on February 13, 2006, "Prison Break" had again risen in viewing figures, making the series the sixth most-viewed program that week, with a rating of 2.06 million.
