= Pilot (Prison Break) =

- Prison Break episode
- Michael reveals his escape plan to his brother.
- Episode no.: Season 1 Episode 1
- Directed by: Brett Ratner
- Written by: Paul Scheuring
- Production code: 1AKJ79
- Original air date: August 29, 2005

Guest appearances
- Rockmond Dunbar as C-Note; Paul Adelstein as Paul Kellerman; Jessalyn Gilsig as Lisa Rix; Muse Watson as Charles Westmoreland; Camille Guaty as Maricruz Delgado; Stacy Keach as Henry Pope; Danny McCarthy as Daniel Hale; James Azreal as Prisoner; Rolando Boyce as Cop; Cheryl Lyn Bruce as Judge; Billy Chase as Prisoner; Matthew H. Harrison as Corrections officer; Nicolas Iovino as Brian; Darnell Jackson as Prisoner; Ora Jones as Wendy; Rich Komenich as Maggio; Phillip Edward Van Lear as C.O. Louis Patterson; Dan Maxwell as Cronie; Danielle Mulligan as Nurse Ana; Larry Nazimek as Prisoner; David Pacheco as Prisoner; Jeff Parker as Tsili; Peggy Roeder as Teller; Chelcie Ross as Bishop McMorrow; Gianni Russo as Gavin Smallhouse; Brandon DeShazer as Prisoner; Philip Rayburn Smith as Adrian Rix; Anthony Starke as Sebastian Balfour; Robert Patrick Stern as Prisoner; Christian Stolte as C.O. Keith Stolte; Laura Wade as Syd; David Dino Wells Jr. as Inmate; Jay Whittaker as Sweatsuit; Alan Wilder as Prison chaplain; James Zahn as Prisoner

Episode chronology
← Previous —	Next → "Allen"
- Prison Break (season 1)

"Pilot" is the pilot episode and series premiere of the American television series Prison Break, which premiered on August 29, 2005, in the United States. That night, it was aired as the first of a two-part pilot special, along with "Allen", which was broadcast straight after this episode. The episode was directed by series producer Brett Ratner, noted director of such works as Rush Hour and Red Dragon, and written by series creator and producer Paul Scheuring. The episode was given numerous positive reviews in not just the US, but from the majority of the rest of world, reaching record ratings in various countries.

The episode introduces the two main protagonists of the series: Michael Scofield (played by Wentworth Miller) and Lincoln Burrows (played by Dominic Purcell). Lincoln Burrows has been sentenced to death for a crime he did not commit: the murder of Terrence Steadman, the brother of the Vice President of the United States. All avenues to delay or appeal Burrows’ execution have been exhausted owing to the high-profile nature of the case. Burrows' brother Michael Scofield, a structural engineer, plans to get himself incarcerated so he can save his brother from his death sentence, by using his new body tattoo.

== Plot ==
Michael Scofield receives a mysterious body tattoo, and then strips his apartment of articles of various people from Fox River, along with a hard disk which he throws into a river. The next day, he robs a bank, but surrenders without incident when the police arrive. Michael is sent to court, refusing to put up a fight, even after his lawyer, Veronica Donovan (Robin Tunney) attempts to defend him, so he is sentenced to 5 years at Fox River, the prison he requested to be sent to. Upon entering Fox River, Michael meets Capt. Brad Bellick (Wade Williams), whom he quickly discovers to be somewhat arrogant. He then meets his cellmate, Fernando Sucre (Amaury Nolasco), who tells him the only thing he can do is serve time. Sucre shows Michael around the outside, noting the territories throughout. He then shows Michael to the isolated Lincoln Burrows (or "Link the Sink" as they call him) who killed Terrence Steadman, the Vice President's brother.

Michael realizes the only way to get to his brother is to join PI (Prison Industries) of which John Abruzzi (Peter Stormare) is in charge. Michael approaches Abruzzi, but is rejected, where he calmly tells Abruzzi that he has something he needs - and leaves an origami crane, giving him a sign that he knows of Fibonacci, the informant who put Abruzzi in prison. Abruzzi allows him to join PI. In the infirmary, Michael introduces himself to Dr. Sara Tancredi (Sarah Wayne Callies), whom he tries to charm. She gives him his insulin shot, since Michael claims to have Type 1 diabetes. On Michael's second visit, Sara notices his abnormally low glucose level and tells him that he is reacting to the insulin as if he is not diabetic. She then says that on his next visit, she would like to run a test. To keep up his bluff, Michael approaches C-Note (Rockmond Dunbar), the prison "pharmacist" and pays him in advance for PUGNAc, an insulin blocker.

Elsewhere, Sucre proposes to his girlfriend, Maricruz Delgado (Camille Guaty), who visits him in conjugal, and accepts. Burrows' son, L.J. (Marshall Allman) starts dealing cannabis, but is arrested by the police. Veronica sees Michael, who tells her to find out who is setting Lincoln up. Bishop McMorrow (Chelcie Ross) attempts to delay Lincoln's death sentence, where he is visited by Secret Service agents Paul Kellerman (Paul Adelstein) and Daniel Hale (Danny McCarthy). After he ignores their warning, McMorrow is shot and killed, at which point, Veronica starts to suspect Burrows may be framed. Fox River's warden, Henry Pope (Stacy Keach) asks Michael if he can finish making a model of the Taj Mahal for his anniversary with his wife, where he eventually starts working. Later, Michael meets Lincoln, and tells him he is going to get him out. After PI, a skeptical Lincoln asks Michael if he's seen the blueprints to the prison. Michael says, "Better than that -- I've got them on me." He reveals his mysterious body tattoo, which is a series of geometric patterns that disguise the blueprints to Fox River, upon which Michael will base his escape plans throughout the series.

== Production ==
The original concept of Prison Break—a man deliberately getting himself sent to prison in order to help someone else (his brother, in this case) escape—was suggested to Paul Scheuring by producer Dawn Parouse, who wanted to produce an action-oriented series. Although Scheuring thought it was a good idea, he was initially stumped as to why someone would embark on such a mission or how he could develop it into a viable television show. He came up with the story of the wrongfully accused brother, and began working on the plot outline and devising the characters. In 2003, he pitched the idea to the Fox Broadcasting Company but was turned down as Fox felt nervous about the long-term possibilities of such a series. He subsequently showed the concept to other channels but was also turned down as it was thought to be more suited for a film project than a television series. Prison Break was later considered as a possible 14-part miniseries, which drew the interest of Steven Spielberg before his departure due to his involvement with War of the Worlds. Thus, the miniseries never materialized. Following the huge popularity of serialized prime time television series such as Lost and 24, the Fox Network had a change of heart and backed the production in 2004.

The pilot episode was filmed a year after Scheuring wrote the script. The majority of the pilot was filmed on location in and around Chicago. After it was closed down in 2002, Joliet Prison became the set of Prison Break in 2005, standing in as Fox River State Penitentiary on screen. Scenes set in Lincoln's cell, the infirmary and the prison yard were all shot on location at the prison. Lincoln's cell was the same one in which serial killer John Wayne Gacy was incarcerated, which at least one member of the production crew refused to enter, believing that it was haunted.

== Broadcast and reception ==
The Pilot, along with the following episode was released on Fox with an estimated audience of 10.5 million viewers, placing the series as the seventh most watched show in America that week, ranking first in both the 18–49 and 18–34 demographics. The critical and ratings success was also evident in various other areas around the world. In the UK, the Pilot episode aired 24 January 2006, and received viewing figures of 0.91 million, which was the 28th most viewed programme in the week on Five. Though not at first successful, the ratings increased as the season progressed.

In France, the episode aired on August 31, 2006, with around 5.5 million viewers (25.8% share). It was not as publicised in Germany since the airing on 21 June 2007, as it received an audience share of only 13.5%. In Poland, the episode aired on January 28, 2007, with an estimated 7 million viewers, the highest rated episode of any foreign series in Poland. The Pilot aired in Greece on 2 January, with a rating of 769,000 viewers, an unusually high figure for an American series to air on Greek television.

Charlie Brooker of The Guardian calls the pilot "possibly the dumbest story ever told" and opines that it is very unrealistic. Brooker jokes that the writing is "like they took a two-year-old to see The Shawshank Redemption, asked him to recount the plot three weeks later, wrote down everything he said, and filmed it."

== Awards and nominations ==
For the episode, Mark Helfrich was nominated for an Eddie Award in the category "Best Edited One-Hour Series for Commercial Television". However, his competitor, Stephen Semel, won the award for the American television series Lost. The pilot episode did, however win an Artios Casting Society of America award for "Best Dramatic Pilot Casting" in 2006. The award was handed to John Papsidera, Wendy O'Brien and Claire Simon.
