= Prison Break season 3 =

Season of television series

Prison Break
- Season 3
- DVD cover
- No. of episodes: 13

Release
- Original network: Fox
- Original release: September 17, 2007 – February 18, 2008

Season chronology
- ← Previous; Season 2 Next → Season 4

The third season of Prison Break, an American serial drama television series, commenced airing in the United States on September 17, 2007, on Mondays at 8:00 pm (EST) on Fox. Prison Break is produced by Adelstein-Parouse Productions, in association with Rat Entertainment, Original Film and 20th Century Fox Television. The season contains 13 episodes and concluded on February 18, 2008. The season was shorter than the previous two due to the 2007–2008 Writers Guild of America strike.

Prison Break revolves around two brothers: one who has been sentenced to death for a crime he did not commit and his younger sibling, a genius structural engineer, who devises an elaborate plan to help him escape prison. The two brothers escape prison in the first season but are hunted down during the second season and ultimately Michael is recaptured and sent to a Panamanian jail, Penitenciaría Federal de Sona, at the end of the second season. The third season revolves around Michael's breakout from Sona with several other inmates.

For the season, three characters are removed, and four new characters are added as series regulars. Filming continued to take place in Dallas, Texas.

== Cast ==
=== Main characters ===
- Dominic Purcell as Lincoln Burrows
- Wentworth Miller as Michael Scofield
- Amaury Nolasco as Fernando Sucre
- Wade Williams as Brad Bellick
- Robert Knepper as Theodore "T-Bag" Bagwell
- Chris Vance as James Whistler
- Robert Wisdom as Norman "Lechero" St. John
- Danay Garcia as Sofia Lugo
- Jodi Lyn O'Keefe as Gretchen Morgan
- William Fichtner as Alexander Mahone

=== Recurring characters ===
- Carlo Alban as Luis "McGrady" Gallego
- Laurence Mason as Sammy
- Davi Jay as Papo
- Marshall Allman as L.J. Burrows
- Joseph Melendez as Rafael
- Curtis Wayne as Cheo
- Christian Bowman as Agent King
- Barbara Eve Harris as FBI Agent Felicia Lang
- John S. Davies as Elliot Pike
- Crystal Mantecón as Carmelita
- Manny Rubio as Juan Nieves
- Carlos Compean as Colonel Escamilla
- Alex Fernandez as Captain Hurtado
- Julio Cedillo as General Mestas
- Kim Coates as Internal Affairs Agent Richard Sullins
- F.J. Rio as Augusto
- Gustavo Mellado as Alphonso Gallego
- Castulo Guerra as General Zavala
- Dominic Keating as Andrew Tyge
- Camille Guaty as Maricruz Delgado
- Silas Weir Mitchell as Charles "Haywire" Patoshik
- Leon Russom as General Jonathan Krantz

== Episodes ==
No. overall	No. in season	Title	Directed by	Written by	Original release date	Prod. code	U.S. viewers (millions)
45	1	"Orientación"	Kevin Hooks	Paul Scheuring	September 17, 2007	3AKJ01	7.51
Scofield, Mahone, Bagwell, and Bellick are incarcerated in Sona, a prison run by the inmates and where personal problems are solved in the ring, where two inmates duel until one is dead. Lincoln arranges for Scofield's transfer, but is approached by Susan B. Anthony, a woman working for the Company, who reveals that they have L.J. and Tancredi and will release them if Scofield breaks out an inmate called James Whistler within the week. In Sona, the inmate leader, Norman "Lechero" St. John tells Scofield that he knows the latter's identity and won't allow another breakout. Bagwell becomes one of Lechero's henchmen while Bellick is forced to clean toilets, where a man hidden behind a wall gives him food in exchange for an errand. An inmate develops a problem with Scofield, orchestrated by Lechero, and the two enter the duel. Bellick puts a note in each dueler's pocket. The fight starts and Scofield overpowers the other, who pulls a knife, which is illegal, before Mahone interferes and kills him. Lincoln tells Scofield of the Company's demand. Outside, a woman recovers the note from the body.
46	2	"Fire/Water"	Bobby Roth	Matt Olmstead	September 24, 2007	3AKJ02	7.41
Having befriended Luis "McGrady" Gallego, a basketballer, Scofield learns from him that Whistler is imprisoned for murdering the mayor's son; the mayor has offered a private and easy trial for anyone who kills Whistler. Bellick tells Scofield who gave him the note and he deduces that it is Whistler. The prison's water supply is cut, starting a progressive riot against Lechero. Meanwhile, Lincoln gets the note from Scofield and intercepts the woman, Sofia Lugo, taking the book she recovered from the address. Anthony forces Lincoln to give her the book, but he surrenders a copy and keeps the original. Sucre learns from Bellick that the latter never captured Maricruz. The former calls her and says that he will stay away from her for the good of her and the baby. Bellick reveals Whistler's whereabouts to Lechero in exchange for food and clothes. His men go to capture him, where they see Mahone, who has his own plan to kill Whistler; but Scofield manages to reestablish the water supply, ending the riot for Lechero and the protection of Whistler in exchange.
47	3	"Call Waiting"	Milan Cheylov	Zack Estrin	October 1, 2007	3AKJ03	7.29
Scofield receives a picture of Tancredi, in which she is pointing to a location in the newspaper. He tells Lincoln that he needs to talk to Tancredi. Lincoln refuses to give Sucre money since he wouldn't agree to help him. Scofield learns that Sona's phone lines are cut and only Lechero has a cell phone. He insists that Bagwell gets the phone, otherwise he will reveal his past as a rapist and pedophile to the inmates. Lugo tells Whistler about Lincoln's deed. Lincoln and Anthony arranged for the call. Tancredi gives Scofield another hint to find her and L.J. Lincoln manages to locate them but the Company operatives can disappear with them again. Lechero finds the unknown number in the call history and tells Sammy, his associate, to investigate it. Sammy and the rest of Lechero's men show displeasure with Bagwell, who then tells Lechero that his men are conspiring against him. As a result, Lechero begins to suspect that his drug business is being manipulated by others. Anthony tells Lincoln to get the package she left in the garage, which shocks him when he learns of the contents.
48	4	"Good Fences"	Michael Switzer	Nick Santora	October 8, 2007	3AKJ04	7.35
Scofield tells Lincoln that the gravedigger of Sona is needed for the plan. It is revealed that what Lincoln saw in the box was apparently Tancredi's head, but Lincoln decides not to tell the truth to Scofield. Sona's power supply is damaged and Lechero makes a deal with Scofield to fix the supply in exchange for the first cell to the East. Scofield tells Mahone that he is included in the plan. Bellick knows that Scofield is planning a breakout and after Scofield refuses to include him, he reveals it to Lechero. Scofield persuades him that Bellick is lying. Lechero punishes Bellick by burning his back with hot coffee. The power problem, which is revealed to have been orchestrated by Scofield, is fixed and he moves to his new cell to continue his plan. Mahone threatens him not to deceive him. Meanwhile, Lincoln returns the original book to Anthony and the two try to hire the gravedigger but his increasing demands make her kill him. Sucre quickly gets the job of gravedigger and as Scofield instructed, burns part of the fence surrounding Sona.
49	5	"Interference"	Karen Gaviola	Karyn Usher	October 22, 2007	3AKJ05	7.44
Scofield realizes that escaping at night is impossible because of the lights and patrolling jeeps. Mahone keeps watching Captain Hurtado, one of the tower guards. A French man arrives in Sona and is quickly deprived of his clothes and money by Sammy. He begins watching Whistler. Bellick tries to befriend him. He claims to know Whistler, making him anxious. Scofield and Whistler continue gathering the necessary tools and information, but Hurtado detects Whistler watching him and the guards storm in and close Scofield's cell, but Whistler manages to convince them of his innocence. Sucre is approached by Augusto, Lechero's partner outside, who pays him to get a package inside Sona; and Sammy recovers it. Bagwell gets involved with Lechero's concubine. While Lincoln and Lugo arrange for the plan outside, Scofield finds out that one of the tower guards is annoyed by the sunlight and turns his face to avoid it at a specific time; and Mahone reveals that Hurtado is addicted to coffee.
50	6	"Photo Finish"	Kevin Hooks	Seth Hoffman	November 5, 2007	3AKJ06	7.69
The Frenchman pushes Bellick away after the latter tries to get closer. The packages Sammy receives are revealed to contain special cigars, one of which Cheo, one of Lechero's henchmen, takes for smoking. The Frenchman is murdered and by Gallego, Lechero finds out that Whistler had a problem with the victim. He is brought for interrogation. Scofield accuses Bellick of the murder, but he denies it. Mahone is visited by FBI agent Lang, who states that Sullins has arranged a hearing for the former to testify against the Company, and he accepts it. Bagwell offers to save Whistler by giving Sammy's ring to Scofield and telling him to put it in the crime scene, giving the former the ground to accuse Sammy. Thinking about what to do, Scofield finds a bloody knife in Mahone's cell. He rushes and informs Lechero, who doesn't believe it because Mahone is leaving. However, instead of Whistler, he kills Cheo for receiving cigars behind his back. He forbids listening to football that day, ruining Scofield's plan to escape unnoticed. Lincoln finally tells Scofield the truth about Tancredi. He gets angry and arranges a duel with Whistler.
51	7	"Vamonos"	Vincent Misiano	Zack Estrin & Kalinda Vazquez	November 5, 2007	3AKJ07	8.00
Scofield reveals that the duel is a plan to gather everyone in the yard, giving the duo the chance. Hurtado is drugged by Lugo as planned and the other guard turns his face away; but as the duo prepares to exit through Sammy's cell, he arrives and delays their plan. They get in "no man's land", but are forced to return before the guard notices. Sammy arrives and takes them to the ring. They tell Lechero that the problem is solved, but he says that they must fight until one is down according to the rules. They start hitting each other until the guard sees the rope hanging from the window. The guards storm in and kill one of Lechero's henchmen, humiliating Lechero for his inability to run the prison. Lincoln and Sucre try to save L.J. before he is killed but fail and he is abducted. Meanwhile, Mahone feels that he needs to do the hearing soon because of showing withdrawal symptoms; but it is not possible. Lechero tells Scofield that he knows the latter was trying to break out and because of his actions, the former's position is threatened in Sona. Lechero demands Scofield to include him in the plan. Scofield sees Anthony visiting Whistler, who maintains their plan can still work if he escapes within the next four days.
52	8	"Bang & Burn"	Bobby Roth	Christian Trokey & Nick Santora	November 12, 2007	3AKJ08	7.18
Scofield tells Gallego to have his father give a message to Lincoln. Sammy convinces Lechero to recruit more men to consolidate their power. The General forces Anthony to get Whistler out by force; and she plans an assault on Sona and informs Whistler. Lechero shows a damaged underground corridor to Scofield. Whistler tries to kill Scofield before Lechero's return. The former claims to be claustrophobic and heads to the roof, followed by Scofield. As the assault starts, the two get to the roof and Scofield prevents Whistler from entering the helicopter and it is forced to retreat. Lincoln gets Scofield's message and realizes that they are in danger. The Company operatives attack them, being killed by Lincoln. The brothers' actions force the Company to rely on them again and not kill L.J. Meanwhile, Mahone asks Lang to get him the medication, which she doesn't in time and he fails the hearing. As a result of another escape attempt, the chief guard transfers Scofield out of Sona.
53	9	"Boxed In"	Craig Ross, Jr.	Karyn Usher	January 14, 2008	3AKJ09	7.87
General Zavala, the new chief guard, tortures Scofield to talk. Mahone is returned to Sona and he continues struggling with symptoms. Bagwell and Whistler agree to get Sammy killed. The former offers Mahone drugs in exchange for killing Sammy, which he refuses. Meanwhile, Sucre has an apparent argument with Lincoln, prompting Anthony to have the former spy on Lincoln; but the argument is revealed to be a ruse to get Sucre inside. Scofield tells the truth to Zavala, who forces Whistler to reveal Anthony's true name, Gretchen Morgan, and her whereabouts. Zavala arrests Morgan and starts torturing her, with Scofield promising her revenge for Tancredi. One of Sammy's men challenges Bellick to the ring, which the latter wins by soaking his hand wraps in acetone to intoxicate his opponent. Bagwell finds out about his trick. Morgan agrees to take Zavala and his soldiers to L.J.'s location, where she manages to free herself and kill them. Scofield and Whistler are returned inside by the new chief. Augusto tells Sammy to move on Lechero and open the last package, which contains a gun.
54	10	"Dirt Nap"	Michael Switzer	Matt Olmstead & Seth Hoffman	January 21, 2008	3AKJ10	7.81
Having dealt with the symptoms, Mahone is back to the plan and Bagwell is included. Sammy casts Lechero out while the team is working underground. Bagwell encourages Bellick to use the same trick to kill Sammy in exchange for getting into the team. Bellick challenges Sammy to the ring before realizing that the chemical is finished, making his death certain. The duel starts and before Sammy can finish him, his men inform him of Scofield's whereabouts. They force Lechero to open the inside door. The team tells Sammy about the plan. As the latter takes a look at the hole in the ceiling, it collapses, caused by Scofield, and kills him before Lechero kills the others and regains his position in Sona. Bagwell agrees to include Bellick anyway. Meanwhile, Sucre gives Morgan wrong information to maintain his cover. Lincoln buys a bomb and Sucre puts it in Morgan's car. Lincoln and Lugo get closer while they find out that Whistler is more than what he pretends to be.
55	11	"Under & Out"	Greg Yaitanes	Zack Estrin	February 4, 2008	3AKJ11	7.35
Gallego begs Scofield to include him, but he believes the former is safer inside because of what the latter has experienced. The rain makes the collapse of the tunnel certain, making Scofield move the plan for that night. The team starts digging faster for the schedule. Morgan finds the bomb Sucre had planted and takes Lugo as another hostage. The former gives Whistler a watch showing the remaining time before Lugo is killed. Scofield decides to include Gallego and tells him to have his father contribute to the plan. As Sucre tries to leave to do his part, he is stopped by a guard who has found an illegal background in his faked file. Scofield tells the team that the lights will be off for only 30 seconds and that is all they have. Lechero, Bagwell, and Bellick force Scofield to let them be the first ones in line because of the shortage of time. Lincoln hijacks a bus and uses it to bring down the electricity pole supplying Sona. The lights go off and the team has 30 seconds.
56	12	"Hell or High Water"	Kevin Hooks	Nick Santora	February 11, 2008	3AKJ12	7.84
The first three run towards the fence; but the lights go back on and Lechero is shot. The guards enter the no man's land and rush inside the prison. They start torturing Bellick, who finally breaks and shows the underground after the four use the cars as cover to escape. They keep running towards the beach with the guards on them. They team up with Lincoln and they use oxygen capsules to swim underwater towards their destination, which is a sea beacon. They await Sucre's arrival with the boat, but he is still stuck in Sona. Gallego's father arrives with the boat and takes them to the dock, where Gallego separates and the four get in a car before realizing that they are chased by the Company operatives. Scofield realizes that Whistler's watch has a tracker and throws it away. They manage to lose the Company men and get into a warehouse. Lincoln decides to kill Mahone for revenge; but is distracted by Whistler's escape and consequently, Mahone escapes. The brothers go after Whistler. In Sona, Bagwell recovers Whistler's book and reveals Sucre's identity to the guards.
57	13	"The Art of the Deal"	Nelson McCormick	Matt Olmstead & Seth Hoffman	February 18, 2008	3AKJ13	7.40
The brothers manage to find Whistler and arrange the exchange in a public place, which Scofield has designated, only to make certain that L.J. and Sofia are fine. Scofield arranges the real trade to be in a museum. Morgan is forced to remove her weapons to enter the museum. L.J. and Whistler are successfully exchanged. Sofia realizes that Whistler is a Company man and decides to go with Lincoln. Having predicted that Morgan has put an operative on every exit, Scofield triggers the alarm. They exit through the main door before a shootout ensues between the Company men and the police. Scofield moves to kill Morgan, but his hesitation allows her to flee. Sofia is wounded and taken to a hospital. Meanwhile, Bagwell gets money from Lechero's concubine and proceeds to kill him. The inmates accept him as the new leader. Sucre doesn't break after a long torture and is sent inside Sona. Mahone joins Whistler's plan. Gallego and his father successfully pass the border and rejoin their family. Scofield decides to continue to search for and kill Morgan, starting with Whistler's apartment.

== Reception ==
In their season review, IGN wrote, "With so much going against it, this shortened third season of Prison Break could have been disastrous. But instead, the writers managed to not only salvage the season, but tell a tightly woven, compelling and action-packed story" and gave it an 8.5 out of 10.

== Production ==
=== Filming ===
Unlike many other TV shows, Prison Break was primarily filmed outside of Hollywood. The first season was primarily shot in and around Chicago, Illinois. During the second season, filming was moved to Dallas, Texas. Filming for the third season continued to be done in Dallas, but the price tag increased to about $3 million per episode. Several of the exterior scenes with Lincoln and Gretchen negotiating the escape from the Panama jail were shot in the Casco Viejo quarter of Panama City.

== Home media release ==
Prison Break: Season Three
Set details		Special features
13 episodes; 4-disc set; 1.78:1 aspect ratio; Subtitles: English, Spanish, French; English (Dolby Digital 5.1 Surround)		Season 3: Orientacion featurette; Breakout Episode featurette; Director's Take featurette; Between Takes featurettes; Episode of The Unit: "Force Majeure"
Release dates
United States; Canada	United Kingdom	Australia; New Zealand
August 12, 2008	May 19, 2008	December 3, 2008
