= Matt Olmstead =

American television writer and producer

Matt Olmstead is an American writer and producer for television shows.

== Early life ==
Olmstead graduated from California State University, Chico in 1988. He is an alumnus of the college of Humanities and Fine Arts. He went to Hollywood in hopes of being a script writer. Olmstead eventually worked with an agent, who set him up with Steven Bochco. After 10 minutes of talking, Bochco offered him the opportunity to write an episode for the show NYPD Blue.

== Career ==
In 1993, Olmstead wrote for the television series NYPD Blue. The series was created by Steven Bochco and David Milch. It focused on a single homicide unit in New York City. Olmstead eventually became an Executive Producer of NYPD Blue, and became a Producer in 2002.

Olmstead worked as a writer on the series Brooklyn South in 1997. The series was created by Milch and Bochco along with William M. Finkelstein and ex-police officer Bill Clark. The show detailed the lives of a single precinct of police patrol officers. Olmstead wrote four episodes for the series' first season. The series was canceled after completing its first season.

He also worked as a writer and producer for NYPD 2069 in 2004. In 2005, he was one of the creators of the show Blind Justice. He wrote the Pilot and Episode 3. The show was canceled in June 2005 after just 13 episodes.

In 2012, Olmstead joined Chicago Fire as an executive producer. In 2014, he co-created the spin-off Chicago P.D..

Though Olmstead was initially the "writer/showrunner" for Law & Order: Organized Crime, he stepped down in October 2020.

== Credits ==
Stumptown (1 episode) (2019)

- 1.02 “Missed Connections” (October 2, 2019)

The Crossing (1 episode) (2018)

- 1.09 "Hope Smiles from the Thereshold" (writer)

Chicago P.D. (2014–present)

Olmstead is the co-creator of Chicago P.D. alongside Dick Wolf, and acts as the show's showrunner. He has written a number of episodes and is an executive producer on every episode.

- 1.01 – "Stepping Stone" (January 8, 2014)
- 1.12 – "8:30 pm" (April 30, 2014) (story co-written with Dick Wolf, teleplay by Michael Brandt & Derek Haas)
- 2.01 – "Call It Macaroni" (September 24, 2014)
- 2.07 – "They'll Have to Go Through Me" (November 11, 2014) (story co-written with Dick Wolf, teleplay by Maisha Closson)
- 2.17 – "Say Her Real Name" (March 25, 2015) (story co-written with Dick Wolf, teleplay by Craig Gore & Tim Walsh)
- 2.20 – "The Number of Rats" (April 29, 2015) (story co-written with Warren Leight, teleplay co-written with Cole Maliska)

Chicago Fire (2012–present) Olmstead is the showrunner of Chicago Fire, joining the show as an executive producer after the show's pilot. Olmstead has written a number of episodes and is an executive producer from episode 2 onwards.

- 1.03 – "Professional Courtesy" (October 24, 2012)
- 1.12 – "Under the Knife" (January 9, 2013) (co-written with Ryan Rege Harris)
- 1.14 – "A Little Taste" (February 6, 2013) (co-written with Hilly Hicks Jr.)
- 1.17 – "Better to Lie" (February 27, 2013) (co-written with Ryan Rege Harris)
- 1.21 – "Retaliation Hit" (May 1, 2013) (co-written with Hilly Hicks Jr.)
- 1.22 – "Leaders Lead" (May 8, 2013) (story co-written with Dick Wolf, teleplay by Michael Brandt & Derek Haas)
- 1.23 – "Let Her Go" (May 15, 2013) (story co-written with Dick Wolf, teleplay by Michael Brandt & Derek Haas)
- 2.04 – "A Nuisance Call" (October 15, 2013) (co-written with Hilly Hicks Jr.)
- 2.16 – "A Rocket Blasting Off" (March 11, 2014) (co-written with Hilly Hicks Jr.)
- 2.18 – "Until Your Feet Leave the Ground" (April 8, 2014) (co-written with Mick Betancourt)
- 2.20 – "A Dark Day" (April 29, 2014) (story co-written with Dick Wolf, teleplay by Michael Brandt & Derek Haas)
- 2.22 – "Real Never Waits" (May 13, 2014) (co-written with Derek Haas)
- 3.07 – "Nobody Touches Anything" (November 11, 2014) (teleplay co-written with Jill Weinberger, story by Dick Wolf and Jill Weinberger)
- 3.14 – "Call It Paradise" (February 10, 2015) (co-written with Michael A. O'Shea)
- 3.17 – "Forgive You Anything" (March 10, 2015) (story co-written with Dick Wolf, teleplay by Andrea Newman)
- 3.19 – "I Am the Apocalypse" (April 7, 2015) (story co-written with Dick Wolf, teleplay by Michael Brandt & Derek Haas)
- 3.21 – "We Called Her Jellybean" (April 28, 2015) (story co-written with Tiller Russell, teleplay by Tiller Russell)

Prison Break (13 episodes) Olmstead is credited for being a writer and an executive producer for the successful Fox network's television series, Prison Break.

- 1.04 – "Cute Poison" (September 12, 2005) (written)
- 1.14 – "The Rat" (March 20, 2006) (written)
- 1.19 – "The Key" (April 24, 2006) (co-written with Zack Estrin, story by Paul Scheuring)
- 1.21 – "Go" (May 8, 2006) (written)
- 2.02 – "Otis" (August 28, 2006) (written)
- 2.14 – "John Doe" (January 22, 2007) (co-written with Nick Santora)
- 2.16 – "Chicago" (February 5, 2007) (co-written with Nick Santora)
- 2.21 – "Fin Del Camino" (March 26, 2007) (co-written with Seth Hoffman)
- 3.02 – "Fire/Water" (September 24, 2007) (written)
- 3.10 – "Dirt Nap" (January 21, 2008) (co-written with Seth Hoffman)
- 3.13 – "The Art of the Deal" (February 18, 2008) (co-written with Seth Hoffman)
- 4.01 – "Scylla" (September 1, 2008)
- 4.16 – "The Sunshine State" (December 22, 2008) (co-written with Nicholas Wootton)
- 4.22 – "Killing Your Number" (May 15, 2009) (co-written with Nicholas Wootton)

Breakout Kings (23 episodes) Olmstead is credited with being a writer and an executive producer for A&E's television series Breakout Kings.

1. Pilot (March 6, 2011) – executive producer, (written)
2. Collected (March 13, 2011) – executive producer
3. The Bag Man (March 20, 2011) – executive producer
4. Out of the Mouths of Babes (March 27, 2011) – executive producer
5. Queen of Hearts (April 3, 2011) – executive producer, (written)
6. Like Father, Like Son (April 10, 2011) – executive producer
7. Fun with Chemistry (April 17, 2011) – executive producer
8. Steaks (April 24, 2011) – executive producer
9. One for the Money (May 1, 2011) – executive producer
10. Paid in Full (May 8, 2011) – executive producer
11. Off the Beaten Path (May 15, 2011) – executive producer
12. There Are Rules (May 22, 2011) – executive producer
13. Where in the World Is Carmen Vega (May 30, 2011) – executive producer
14. An Unjust Death (March 4, 2012) – executive producer
15. Round Two (March 11, 2012) – executive producer
16. Double Down (March 18, 2012) – executive producer
17. Cruz Control (March 25, 2012) – executive producer
18. Self Help (April 1, 2012) – executive producer
19. I Smell Emmy (April 8, 2012) – executive producer
20. Ain't Love (50) Grand? (April 15, 2012) – executive producer
21. SEALd Fate (April 22, 2012) – executive producer
22. Served Cold (April 29, 2012) – executive producer
23. Freakshow (April 29, 2012) – executive producer

Blind Justice (5 episodes)

- 1 – Pilot (March 8, 2005) (written)
- 3 – Rub a Tub Tub (March 22, 2005) (written)
- 8 – Past Imperfect (April 26, 2005) (written)
- 11 – Dance with Me (May 17, 2005) (written)
- 12 – Under the Gun (May 31, 2005) (written)

NYPD Blue (71 episodes)

- 6.10 – Show & Tell (January 12, 1999) (written)
- 6.16 – T'aint Misbehavin (April 13, 1999) (written)
- 7.06 – Brothers Under Arms (February 15, 2000) (written)
- 7.09 – Jackass (February 29, 2000) (written)
- 7.14 – Sleep Over (April 4, 2000) (written)
- 7.17 – Roll Out the Barrel (April 25, 2000) (written)
- 8.01 – Daveless in New York (January 9, 2001) (written)
- 10.01 – Ho Down (September 24, 2002) – (produced)
- 10.02 – You've Got Mail (October 1, 2002) (produced)
- 10.03 – One in the Nuts (October 8, 2002) (produced)
- 10.04 – Meat Me in the Park (October 15, 2002) (produced)
- 10.05 – Death by Cycle (October 22, 2002) (produced)
- 10.06 – Maya Con Dios (October 29, 2002) (produced)
- 10.07 – Das Boots (November 12, 2002) (produced)
- 10.08 – Below the Belt (November 19, 2002) (produced)
- 10.09 – Half-Ashed (November 26, 2002) (produced)
- 10.10 – Healthy McDowell Movement (December 10, 2002) (produced)
- 10.11 – I Kid You Not (January 7, 2003) (produced)
- 10.12 – Arrested Development (January 14, 2003) (produced)
- 10.13 – Bottoms Up (February 4, 2003) (produced)
- 10.14 – Laughlin All the Way to the Clink (February 11, 2003) (produced)
- 10.15 – Tranny Get Your Gun (February 18, 2003) (produced)
- 10.16 – Nude Awakening (February 25, 2003) (produced)
- 10.17 – Off the Wall (April 8, 2003) (produced)
- 10.18 – Marine Life (April 15, 2003) (produced)
- 10.19 – Meet the Grandparents (April 29, 2003) (produced)
- 10.20 – Maybe Baby (May 6, 2003) (produced)
- 10.21 – Yo, Adrian (May 13, 2003) (produced)
- 10.22 – 22 Skidoo (May 20, 2003) (produced)
- 11.01 – Frickin' Fraker (September 23, 2003) (produced)
- 11.02 – Your Bus, Ted (September 30, 2003) (produced)
- 11.03 – Shear Stupidity (October 7, 2003) (produced)
- 11.04 – Porn Free (October 14, 2003) (produced)
- 11.05 – Keeping Abreast (October 21, 2003) (produced & written)
- 11.06 – Andy Appleseed (October 28, 2003) (produced)
- 11.07 – It's to Die For (November 4, 2003) (produced)
- 11.08 – And the Wenner Is... (November 18, 2003) (produced)
- 11.09 – Only Schmucks Pay Income Tax (November 25, 2003) (produced)
- 11.10 – You Da Bomb (February 10, 2004) (produced & written)
- 11.11 – Passing the Stone (February 17, 2004) (produced)
- 11.12 – Chatty Chatty Bang Bang (March 2, 2004) (produced)
- 11.13 – Take My Wife, Please (March 9, 2004) (produced)
- 11.14 – Colonel Knowledge (March 16, 2004) (produced)
- 11.15 – Old Yeller (March 23, 2004) (produced)
- 11.16 – On the Fence (March 30, 2004) (produced)
- 11.17 – In Goddess We Trussed (April 6, 2004) (produced)
- 11.18 – The Brothers Grim (April 13, 2004) (produced)
- 11.19 – Peeler? I Hardley Knew Her (April 20, 2004) (produced)
- 11.20 – Traylor Trash (April 27, 2004) (produced)
- 11.21 – What's Your Poison? (May 4, 2004) (produced)
- 11.22 – Who's Your Daddy? (May 11, 2004) (produced)
- 12.01 – Dress for Success (September 21, 2004) (produced)
- 12.02 – Fish Out of Water (September 28, 2004) (produced)
- 12.03 – Great Balls of Ire (October 12, 2004) (produced)
- 12.04 – Divorce, Detective Style (October 12, 2004) (produced)
- 12.05 – You're Buggin' Me (October 26, 2004) (produced)
- 12.06 – The Vision Thing (November 9, 2004) (produced)
- 12.07 – My Dinner with Andy (November 16, 2004) (produced)
- 12.08 – I Like Ike (November 23, 2004) (produced)
- 12.09 – The 3-H Club (November 30, 2004) (produced)
- 12.10 – The Dead Donald (December 7, 2004) (produced)
- 12.11 – Bale Out (December 14, 2004) (produced)
- 12.12 – I Love My Wives, But Oh You Kid (December 21, 2004) (produced)
- 12.13 – Stoli with a Twist (January 11, 2005) (produced)
- 12.14 – Stratis Fear (January 18, 2005) (produced)
- 12.15 – La Bomba (January 25, 2005) (produced)
- 12.16 – Old Man Quiver (February 1, 2005) (produced)
- 12.17 – Sergeant Sipowicz' Lonely Hearts Club Band (February 8, 2005) (produced)
- 12.18 – Lenny Scissorhands (February 15, 2005) (produced)
- 12.19 – Bale to the Chief (February 22, 2005) (produced)
- 12.20 – Moving Day (March 1, 2005) (produced)

=== Short film ===
- The Tattooed Heart – Directed by Sheldon Wong Schwartz, written by Matt Olmstead, with Jennifer Morrison and Madison Wolfe
