= Dishdogz =

- Film poster
- Directed by: Mikey Hilb
- Written by: Steven Sessions
- Produced by: Anthony Fiorino; Donald Zuckerman
- Starring: Luke Perry; Haylie Duff; Marshall Allman; Ryan Sheckler
- Cinematography: Christopher Gosch
- Distributed by: Lionsgate
- Release dates: October 17, 2006 (Hungary); June 12, 2007 (United States)
- Running time: 90 minutes
- Country: United States
- Language: English

Dishdogz is a 2006 American film starring Luke Perry and Haylie Duff and directed by Mikey Hilb.

== Plot ==
When Kevin (Marshall Allman) looks for a way to escape his back-breaking summer job, he enlists in the kitchen at an extreme summer camp with the hopes of spending his breaks on the half-pipe. But Kevin gets more than he bargained for when he teams up with his fellow extreme skateboarder dishwashers, The Dishdogz. He'll have to be more radical than the competition and win the heart of the girl (Haylie Duff) if he's going to keep up with his new crew. But before he does, he'll have to get all his work done, if he's to avoid a thrashing from his surly boss Tony (Luke Perry), who's hiding a secret that's truly old school. In the end he learns the true meaning of skateboarding and how to never give up.

== Cast ==
| Actor | Role |
|---|---|
| Marshall Allman | Kevin |
| Haylie Duff | Cassidy |
| Luke Perry | Tony |
| Ryan Sheckler | Ele Mesmo |
| Tony Alva | Himself |
| Art Alexakis | Cop |
| Jane Brucker | Mãe de Kevin |
| John Cantwell | Sam Hooper |
| Francis Capra | Cooper |
| Michael Copon | Palmer |
| Timothy Lee DePriest | Malone |
| Carlos Sanz | Miles |
| Danny Gonzalez | Briggs |
| Ehren McGhehey | Fired Dish Boy |
| Kelvin Kane Gully | Camp Counselor |
