= The Chicago Code =

American crime drama television series

- Genre: Crime drama
- Created by: Shawn Ryan
- Starring: Jason Clarke; Jennifer Beals; Matt Lauria; Devin Kelley; Todd Williams; Billy Lush; Delroy Lindo
- Theme music composer: Robert Duncan
- Opening theme: Performed by Billy Corgan
- Composer: Robert Duncan
- Country of origin: United States
- Original language: English
- No. of seasons: 1
- No. of episodes: 13

Production
- Executive producers: Shawn Ryan; Tim Minear; Charles McDougall
- Production locations: Chicago, Illinois
- Cinematography: Rohn Schmidt
- Running time: 43 minutes
- Production companies: MiddKid Productions; 20th Century Fox Television

Original release
- Network: Fox
- Release: February 7 – May 23, 2011

The Chicago Code is an American crime drama television series created by Shawn Ryan that aired on Fox in the United States. The series was filmed in Chicago, Illinois, originally airing from February 7 to May 23, 2011, with Fox announcing cancellation on May 10, 2011.

== Plot ==
The series follows officers of the Chicago Police Department as they fight crime on the streets and try to expose political corruption within the city. Veteran Chicago Police Detective Jarek Wysocki leads the special unit fighting against the corruption. Wysocki was assigned to head the special unit by his boss, the newly appointed first-female Chicago Police Superintendent and his one-time partner, Teresa Colvin.

Also on the unit is Caleb Evers, a young detective and Wysocki's latest partner. During their investigations the detectives often encounter police officers Vonda Wysocki (Jarek's niece) and Vonda's partner Isaac Joiner. Undercover officer Chris Collier, who goes by the name Liam Hennessey while undercover, works the streets as he gets information on Hugh Killian and the Irish mob and their connection to the corruption. Believed to be a source of the corruption is Alderman Ronin Gibbons, a powerful and influential politician in Chicago.

== Cast ==
=== Main ===
- Jason Clarke as Jarek Wysocki, a tough Chicago Polish-American homicide detective seen as a legendary figure in the department, who hates profanity, loves the Chicago White Sox, and has a hard time finding a partner who can keep up with him on the streets of the city so he has detectives who can't make "the cut" reassigned "at each other's mutual request". He and Colvin were partnered when starting out as officers, and they share a close friendship, leading her to give him the authority to take over investigations of other officers' cases. Wysocki continues to look for the killers of his late brother who was also a Chicago police officer. Wysocki is divorced, and engaged to a 27-year-old woman (despite the fact that he is much older), but still intimate with his ex-wife.
- Jennifer Beals as Teresa Colvin, Chicago's first female police superintendent. She is a very tough and ambitious officer, unafraid to challenge government officials or demote officers she sees as incompetent, even at the risk of making enemies in the department. In the pilot she reveals that her parents' business and marriage were destroyed by the corruption in the city, and she has made cleaning it up a personal task.
- Matt Lauria as Caleb Evers, a young homicide detective who is Wysocki's latest partner, and impresses both Wysocki (despite the fact Evers is also a Cubs fan) and Colvin with his observational skills. He is a graduate of Northwestern University and has a pending application to the Federal Bureau of Investigation.
- Devin Kelley as Vonda Wysocki, Jarek's niece and a rookie police officer. Her father was killed in the line of duty when she was a young child, and her uncle helped raise her and supported her through the police academy.
- Todd Williams as Isaac Joiner, Vonda's partner, a young and ambitious officer whose hot-shot ways lead Wysocki to worry for his niece. It is later revealed that he is Vonda's boyfriend.
- Billy Lush as Liam Hennessey, introduced as a low-level thug, later revealed to be a police officer named Chris Collier working undercover in the Irish mob
- Delroy Lindo as Alderman Ronin Gibbons, a Chicago alderman with more than twenty years in office, widely seen as the most influential figure in the city's political machine. Colvin identifies him as the main target in her anti-corruption crusade.

=== Recurring ===
- Adam Arkin as FBI Division Chief Cuyler
- Steven Culp as Dennis Mahoney, the mayor's chief of staff
- Madison Dirks as Mikey, a man who works for Killian
- Colby French as Roger Kelly, Colvin's chief of staff as appointed by Gibbons
- John Heard as Mayor McGuinness
- Brad William Henke as Ernie "Moose" Moosekian, part of the CPD's Narcotics Division
- Warren Kole as Ray Bidwell, Colvin's driver, former Marine, and security detail
- Patrick Gough as Will Gainey, a man who works for Killian
- Camille Guaty as Elena, Jarek's fiancée, who breaks up with him after he tells her he is still in love with Dina
- Shannon Lucio as Elizabeth Killian, Hugh Killian's daughter
- Cynthia McWilliams as Lilly Beauchamp, Gibbons' secretary and lover
- Amy Price-Francis as Dina Wysocki, Jarek's ex-wife, with whom he carries on an affair while engaged to Elena
- Patrick St. Esprit as Hugh Killian, an Irish mob boss
- Phillip Edward Van Lear as Ellis Hicks, Gibbons' right-hand man

== Production and cancellation ==
Originally titled Ride-Along, Fox green-lit the pilot in January 2010. The series was created by Shawn Ryan, who grew up in Rockford, Illinois. Regarding the setting of Chicago, Ryan said, "It's a city I'm very familiar with, and one I haven't seen photographed much, at least on TV," and that Chicago is "the center of the universe." When describing the show, he stated, "There will be a few twists that make it different from other cop shows on the air and will make it Fox-like." When under its original title and concept, Ryan described the show as "a police show in Chicago that kind of made the viewer feel as if they were in the police car with the cops." As the concept grew, the series was re-titled to The Chicago Code, saying "It became much, much more than I originally intended. It became a show that I realized I wanted to be about a lot more than just police officers. So police officers are who we use to look at the city and look at the intersection of politics and its citizenry."

Fox announced the cancellation of the series on May 10, 2011. The final episode of the series aired May 23, 2011.

About Fox's decision to cancel the show, Jennifer Beals said: "They didn’t think to look at +3s and +7s. I’m guessing. This is a guess, and it could be technologically completely inaccurate. But it was such a well-written show, and the characters were so interesting, and the pace of the show was good, and it looked really good… I don’t totally understand why they let that go."

Creator Shawn Ryan also give his thoughts about the cancellation:

"I can’t say why it was canceled. I really liked the show. I thought FOX gave their best efforts to launch the show and put it in a position to succeed. We semi-succeeded, but we weren’t undeniably successful and when you aren’t undeniably successful, you are at the mercy of the executives and bean counters. I never got an answer to why the show was canceled. I certainly never got any complaints from a creative standpoint. That really was a passion project for me. To do a show that was very specific to Chicago and to sort of embrace the ethos and the way of life of those people and bring that to screen, I thought was something really exciting and jazzed me to come to work every day."

In 2023, he gave further insight about the show's cancellation: "One of the reasons I left 20th Television was I'd made The Chicago Code and they had to pitch this to Kevin Reilly at Fox. It was sold Fox and it got canceled after one year. I never thought it belonged there, but I had a sister studio that was insisting that it that it be first presented to its sister network, the sister network wanted it. As a result, I never got to make the case to go somewhere else and I really didn't like that."

== Episodes ==
No.	Title	Directed by	Written by	Original release date	Prod. code	US viewers (millions)
1	"Pilot"	Charles McDougall	Shawn Ryan	February 7, 2011	1ATA79	9.43
Members of the Chicago Police Department, led by Chicago's first female superintendent Teresa Colvin (Jennifer Beals), take aim at corruption which they believe is being supported by Alderman Ronin Gibbons (Delroy Lindo). When Colvin's request for an official task force is denied by corrupt officials, she decides to create an unofficial one, including her former partner, Jarek Wysocki (Jason Clarke).
2	"Hog Butcher"	Clark Johnson	Patrick Massett & John Zinman	February 14, 2011	1ATA01	7.35
After the death of Antonio Betz, a fellow officer, the Chicago Police Department track down his killer. Antonio's mother will not receive any death benefits because he was not wearing his bulletproof vest as he gave it to Colvin to save her life. Dealing with her grief, she blames Colvin and serves her with a notice. After catching the killer, Jarek visits church where he vows to find and kill his brother's killer.
3	"Gillis, Chase & Babyface"	Guy Ferland	Davey Holmes	February 21, 2011	1ATA09	7.87
Jarek and his partner Caleb Evers (Matt Lauria) chase down a bank robber, but when they get to him, he's already been shot dead. They continue to track down the other people involved with the robbery, including a security guard who was shot who may be involved. Undercover officer Liam Hennessey (Billy Lush) learns of a connection between the Irish mob and Alderman Gibbons regarding a construction site, and later tells Jarek. Superintendent Colvin clashes with Gibbons over the construction site, which she knows is full of no-shows collecting paychecks and overbilling the city, which she believes Gibbons orchestrated. Gibbons then has Colvin's chief of staff fired after publicly exposing a tape of him conspiring against Colvin. Gibbons then has him replaced with a man who he used to work with. Jarek and Colvin vow to continue to try and take down Gibbons.
4	"Cabrini-Green"	Jean de Segonzac	Tim Minear & Jon Worley	February 28, 2011	1ATA10	8.04
The Chicago Police Department track down an anonymous bomber whose MO matches the bombings by the Chicago Liberation Army from the 1970s. Alderman Gibbons is the target of a hit by a young boy. After the incident, he persuades the boy to tell him who set it up. Gibbons then arranges for the gang leader to be killed.
5	"O'Leary's Cow"	Clark Johnson	Kevin Townsley	March 7, 2011	1ATA03	7.46
After a teenage boy is murdered in Chinatown when spreading the word of his church, detectives Wysocki and Evers ask for Superintendent Colvin's assistance. When the unofficial mayor of Chinatown is uncooperative, Colvin gets the help of Gibbons who accelerates the investigation. Teresa's brother-in-law Robert (Rockmond Dunbar) asks for her help where he believes a rival company of his friends is laundering money. Unaware to her, Robert received $50,000 in exchange for Teresa to help with getting the rival company shut down. She is forced to turn him in to the FBI as her involvement in the business deal would implicate her and her department. Undercover officer Liam gets closer with the Irish mob when he's allowed on a job, to commit arson which leads to remodeling work where they would get paid. Liam then finds out that someone died during the fire.
6	"The Gold Coin Kid"	Lesli Linka Glatter	Heather Mitchell	March 14, 2011	1ATA02	7.30
A young woman is found dead and Wysocki and Evers link her to a call-girl club catering to Chicago's elite. Meanwhile, Teresa tries to replace the department's old radios after an incident where an officer could not call for backup as the battery was dead.
7	"Black Hand and the Shotgun Man"	Billy Gierhart	Davey Holmes	March 21, 2011	1ATA04	6.16
Wysocki and Evers capture a drug lord only to discover that the cash in his boat is ransom money for his son, who's been kidnapped. Wysocki's own domestic life gets more complicated when his son finds out that he and his mother (Wysocki's ex) are still sleeping together. Meanwhile, Liam's hired temporarily by Alderman Gibbons as his driver. He accompanies Gibbons on housecalls to bereaved constituents, one of whom, as Gibbons seems to know, is the widow of the man Liam killed in the fire. Afterwards, Liam vows to Superintendent Colvin that he will remain undercover, to see Gibbons brought down.
8	"Wild Onions"	Adam Arkin	Virgil Williams	April 11, 2011	1ATA05	5.94
With record-breaking summer heat and potential blackouts, violence escalates in the streets of Chicago, putting the Chicago Police Department in full force. Superintendent Colvin gets back in the field, while detectives Wysocki and Evers take on a case where a son witnessed his father's murder. Meanwhile, undercover officer Liam continues to get closer with Alderman Gibbons.
9	"St. Valentine's Day Massacre"	Michael Offer	Christal Henry	April 18, 2011	1ATA06	6.38
Superintendent Colvin is blamed for the city's rising crime problem by the Mayor after five merchants are killed in a restaurant in Lincoln Park, which receives media coverage. Colvin puts Wysocki and Evers on the case, hoping they will catch the killer and restore her credibility.
10	"Bathhouse & Hinky Dink"	Terrence O'Hara	Patrick Massett & John Zinman	May 2, 2011	1ATA07	5.60
As Colvin and Wysocki are preparing the final stages of their case against Alderman Gibbons, they mount an investigation after a deadlocked jury acquits a corrupt city official.
11	"Black Sox"	Michael Offer	Heather Mitchell & Kevin Townsley	May 9, 2011	1ATA08	5.67
Colvin takes on the police department's corrupt promotion system after a prominent gay man is murdered. Vonda receives an anonymous package that reveals more about the Wysocki family. Jarek meanwhile reveals his feelings for and his affair with Dina to Elena, causing their breakup and Dina to reject him.
12	"Greylord & Gambat"	Paris Barclay	Virgil Williams	May 16, 2011	1ATA11	5.86
Colvin, Wysocki, and Evers try to win Killian as star witness in their case against Alderman Gibbons. Meanwhile, undercover officer Liam continues to gather evidence for the case.
13	"Mike Royko's Revenge"	Lesli Linka Glatter	Shawn Ryan & Christal Henry	May 23, 2011	1ATA12	7.11
To seal the deal with Irish mobster Hugh Killian Superintendent Colvin needs the help of FBI Special Agent Cuyler (Adam Arkin). The deal becomes moot, however, as Killian is shot and killed right before testifying. Jarek deals with his dead brother who was a dirty cop after all, but in a surprise twist evidence he left behind helps the case against Alderman Gibbons come to a conclusion.

== Reception ==
The pilot received favorable reviews, scoring 75 out of 100 based on 25 professional reviews on Metacritic. James Queally of The Star-Ledger said that "Ryan's well-crafted characters are what truly carry the pilot, in what equates to an effective, but not groundbreaking, origin story." Noel Murray of The A.V. Club gave the pilot a B+, saying "the show, as a whole, makes great use of Chicago as a character, which in itself gives it a look and feel unlike other urban TV cop thrillers."

IGN gave the pilot an 8.5 out of 10, noting that "Chicago Code comes off as a 'tale'. Almost as a city legend-in-the-making, with Scorsese-eque voice-overs in place, letting you know that this story, in a sense, has already happened."

David Bianculli of NPR wrote that "[i]t borrows a little from The Wire, HBO's landmark series about entrenched, corrupted city institutions, and a little from EZ Streets, the vintage Paul Haggis cop series that gave equal weight to its good guys and its bad guys. But those are great places to start."

Brian Ford Sullivan of The Futon Critic named the pilot episode the 13th best episode of 2011, naming it his favorite pilot of the year, and calling it "everything a television series should be: a toy box of well-rounded characters put in a distinct landscape with stories and attitudes that can be anything from funny to terrifying to heart-breaking, never knowing which is coming next".

In 2019, Padraig Cotter from Screen Rant named the show "The best cop show nobody watched" and said about it: "Considering his experience with The Shield, Ryan was obviously the right pick for a new gritty new cop show that broke away from formula. The Chicago Code had a great cast, smart writing and it found a new approach to a genre that can feel a little played out."

== International broadcasts ==
The series aired on Global in Canada concurrently with the American broadcast. It began airing in the United Kingdom and Ireland on Sky1 on May 12, 2011.
