= Cupid (2009 TV series) =

2009 American TV series

- Genre: Comedy drama
- Created by: Rob Thomas
- Starring: Bobby Cannavale; Sarah Paulson; Rick Gomez; Camille Guaty
- Composer: Josh Kramon
- Country of origin: United States
- Original language: English
- No. of seasons: 1
- No. of episodes: 7

Production
- Executive producers: Rob Thomas; Jennifer Gwartz; Danielle Stokdyk; Dan Etheridge; Diane Ruggerio
- Running time: 60 minutes
- Production companies: Rob Thomas Productions; ABC Studios; Sony Pictures Television

Original release
- Network: ABC
- Release: March 31 – June 16, 2009

Cupid is an American comedy drama television series; a mid-season replacement, it aired seven episodes on ABC from March 31 to June 16, 2009, and was broadcast Tuesdays at 10:02 PM Eastern/9:02 PM Central. The series is a remake of the network's 1998 series of the same name, and, like the earlier series, was created by Rob Thomas, with both versions centering on a man, who may or may not be the Roman god Cupid, who believes he must bring 100 couples together in order to return to Mount Olympus. The series stars Bobby Cannavale and is set in New York City, whereas the earlier series stars Jeremy Piven and is set in Chicago. Like the original series, the 2009 Cupid lasted only one season, and was canceled on May 19, 2009.

== Premise ==
Like the 1998 series from which it draws inspiration, this series is about a larger-than-life character who may or may not be the Roman god of love – Cupid – sent to earth to bring one hundred couples together before he is allowed to return to Mount Olympus. Whether by fate or other circumstances, Trevor Pierce is under the care of psychiatrist and self-help author Dr. Claire McCrae, whose own work is often based the study of romantic relationships. Claire's philosophy on true love is that it's the result of building friendship and compatibility. Trevor, by contrast, views it as heat and passion conquering all.

== Cast and characters ==
- Cupid/Eros (Bobby Cannavale), a New York bartender of unknown origin on a mission to unite one hundred couples in true, lasting love. Though his apartment is leased under the name "Ed Ross" (based on his Greek title, Eros), he is known officially by the hospital and to most others as "Trevor Pierce" (a name taken from the marble inscription "…the world felt the tremor, and the darkness was pierced," on the hospital wall). According to Trevor, the gods of Olympus banished him to earth with the task of uniting one hundred permanent couples without the aid of divine omniscience or his bow and arrows as punishment for his poor performance as god of love. A string of hardwood beads hung in his apartment (and seemingly controlled by supernatural forces) tallies the couples he has effectively united (one). Though Trevor's claims of divinity lack sufficient proof, he displays an uncanny knowledge of Mediterranean culture, excels in archery, and is well versed in all Greco-Roman myths except the story of Cupid and Psyche (either indicating that he has forgotten this occurrence, that it has yet to happen, or that he is lying). But in the episode, 'My Fair Masseuse', as Claire is trying to dig out the truth of Trevor's identity, he tells a story of a professor who falls in love with one of his colleagues. A previous lover of his is jealous and tries to ruin it by making the man out to be a monster, and not being able to take it, the woman takes tons of pills and places herself in a deep sleep. (According to the legend of Cupid and Psyche, Psyche had jealous sisters who filled her head with lies about Cupid, which led her to open a box from the Underworld that she thought was filled with beauty, but was actually filled with an infernal sleep.) Which means he is really Cupid, but places a humorous spin on the legend to get Claire off his tracks, which works.
- Dr. Claire McCrae (Sarah Paulson), a New York psychiatrist who leads a support group for singles seeking lasting, meaningful romantic relationships based on shared interests and friendship. She has been assigned the task of supervising and studying Trevor Pierce (whose name she knows is an alias), and readmitting him to a mental institution if he poses any significant danger to the public. In her case study ("Cupid: A Case Study") she expresses the belief that Trevor's delusion is in response to the repressed memory of a former lover (explaining his lack of knowledge about Cupid's mythical wife, Psyche). However, there is some indication (if Trevor is, indeed, Cupid) that she herself may be Psyche: Greek psūkhē (psyche) means "soul – spirit", and she is a psychiatrist; furthermore, in the myth Psyche is a mortal who falls in love with Cupid but believes he is a monster, not a god (whereas McCrae, who has expressed an attraction to Trevor, believes he is mentally unstable, not a god).
- Félix Arroyo (Rick Gomez), Trevor's landlord and employer.
- Lita Arroyo (Camille Guaty), Félix's sister and Trevor's coworker.

== Episodes ==
No.	Title	Directed by	Written by	Original release date
1	"Pilot"	Bharat Nalluri	Rob Thomas	March 31, 2009
After being arrested for helping Irishman Dave (Sean Maguire) vandalize the New Year's celebration in New York to catch the eye of a girl he had met for twenty minutes years ago in Dublin, a man claiming to be Cupid is sent to a mental institution for three months before being released after he is determined no danger to the public. Publicly calling himself Trevor Pierce, "Cupid" is put under the surveillance of mental health professional and relationship guidance counselor Claire McCrae. Trevor attends Claire's group session, helping create a successful connection between Dave and group member Madelyn (Marguerite Moreau).
2	"Live and Let Spy"	Michael Fields	Diane Ruggerio	April 7, 2009
Trevor helps create a successful connection between relationship group member Riley (Julie Ann Emery), who turns out to be an heiress in disguise, and Mick (Erik Palladino), the private investigator whose work helped ruin Riley's previous relationship. Meanwhile, Trevor instigates an budding connection between Félix and Mira (Mary Stuart Masterson), who turns out to be Lita's boyfriend's mom. Félix breaks it off when Mira is only looking for a sex rebound from her recent divorce.
3	"The Great Right Hope"	Michael Grossman	David Walpert	April 14, 2009
Trevor assists Marshall (Colton James), a teen who is already trying to match his single mom, Hallie (Constance Zimmer), with his boxing instructor, Clint (Lee Tergesen). Marshall, a skilled hacker, had learned that Clint is his father – as an anonymous sperm donor. The strong connection between his "parents" is derailed by Clint being a staunch Republican, while Hallie is a firm Democrat Hallie. Their mutual love for Marshall, whom Clint had come to like before learning the truth, clears this last hurdle between the couple.
4	"The Tommy Brown Affair"	Matthew Diamond	David Walpert	April 28, 2009
Trevor helps Tommy (Adam Kaufman), a locksmith and former jewel thief who is in love with his parole officer, Paula (Shirley Rumierk).
5	"Shipping Out"	Michael Fields	Cindy Chupack	May 5, 2009
Trevor tries to reunite high-school sweethearts, soldier Joe Adams (Patrick J. Adams) and chef Robin (Aubrey Dollar).
6	"Left of the Dial"	Michael Grossman	Michael Oates Palmer	May 12, 2009
Trevor sets his sights on a radio DJ (Mather Zickel) and one of his listeners (Alexie Gilmore).
7	"My Fair Masseuse"	John T. Kretchmer	Rob Thomas	June 16, 2009
A dialect expert (Patch Darragh) is enlisted by Claire to seek clues to Trevor's origins, and by Trevor to act as Henry Higgins to a masseuse (Kerry Butler).

== Production ==
Daily Variety had reported as early as October 2007 that ABC had approved a new version of the series, to be set in Los Angeles, as part of a one-year development deal between ABC Studios and series creator Rob Thomas. A follow-up report published in The Hollywood Reporter in March 2008 noted that the network had received initial scripts for the series and approved production for episodes to be broadcast as a mid-season replacement for 2008 or 2009.

As production developed, the series' primary setting was shifted to New York City. Filming for the new series took place in locations including Albemarle Rd in Kensington, Brooklyn, 232 E. 3rd St. in Brooklyn, and 47th Avenue between 41st and 43rd Street in Sunnyside, Queens.

== U.S. Nielsen ratings ==
Episode Number	Episode	Rating	Share	Rating/Share (18-49)	Viewers (millions)	Rank (Timeslot)	Rank (Overall)
1	"Pilot"	4.8	8	2.3/6	7.56	unknown	#35
2	"Live and Let Spy"	3.8	6	1.6/5	6.22	3	47
3	"The Great Right Hope"	4.1	7	1.8/5	6.59	3	45
4	"The Tommy Brown Affair"	3.8	6	1.8/5	6.16	3	45
5	"Shipping Out"	3.5	6	1.7/5	5.14	unknown	59
6	"Left of the Dial"	3.6	6	1.4/4	5.50	4	54
7	"My Fair Masseuse"	1.5	3	0.6/2	2.31	4	23
