= Tab Baker =

American actor (1960–2010)

- Born: Terrence Alonzo Baker; November 15, 1960; Chicago, Illinois
- Died: August 9, 2010 (aged 49); Chicago, Illinois

Terrence Alonzo Baker (November 15, 1960 – August 9, 2010) was an American actor.

== Biography ==
Baker was born on November 15, 1960, in Chicago, Illinois. He was a graduate of Marquette University in Milwaukee. Baker had an acting career that spanned 30 years. He was a successful actor on stage, TV and in film. Some of Baker's credits include Prison Break, Cupid, ER, and Early Edition. He also acted in films such as Gladiator and The Ice Harvest. Baker also taught acting at Columbia College and at the Act One Studios.

Baker died in his home at the age of 49 on August 9, 2010, after suffering from a heart attack. He is survived by his daughter, five brothers and four sisters.

== Filmography ==
- Death of a President (2006) as Hat Man
- Stranger Than Fiction (2006) as Demolition Crew #2
- Prison Break as Crab Simmons (2 episodes, 2005–2006)
- The Ice Harvest (2005) as Dennis
- ER as Vendor (1 episode, 2001)
- Just Visiting (2001) as Cabbie
- Save the Last Dance (2001) as Mr. Campbell
- Cupid as Vaughn (1 episode)
- Hoodlum (1997) as Willie Brunder
- Due South as Lou Robbins (1 episode, 1996)
- Gladiator (1992) as Storm Trooper
