= Paul Scheuring =

American film director

- Born: November 20, 1968 (age 57); Aurora, Illinois, United States
- Occupations: Screenwriter, director
- Years active: 2000–present

Paul T. Scheuring (born November 20, 1968) is an American screenwriter and director of films and television shows. His work includes the 2003 film A Man Apart and the creation of the television drama Prison Break, for which he was also credited as an executive producer and head writer.

== Early life ==
Scheuring was born in Aurora, Illinois. He attended the UCLA School of Theater Film and Television and has worked as a courier, cable installer and factory worker.

== Career ==
After working on 36K in 2000 and A Man Apart in 2003, Scheuring made his first attempt at television show writing. After developing an idea given to him by a female colleague into a miniseries screenplay called Prison Break, he approached the Fox network with the script but was turned down due to its unconventional storyline. However, in 2004, after the successful premiere of Lost, Fox backed Prison Break's production and the first episode was aired approximately twenty months after Scheuring had written the script. The series proceeded to win the 2006 People's Choice Award for Favorite New TV Drama and was nominated for Best Drama Television Series at the 2006 Golden Globe Awards. Moreover, Prison Break was picked up by Fox for three more seasons. In 2005, he signed an overall deal with 20th Century Fox. He runs a production company, One Light Road Productions.

Scheuring has also co-written Mexicali, which was scheduled for release in 2010.

=== Future projects ===
Following the completion of Prison Break, Scheuring began production of AR2, a drama co-developed with The West Wing director/exec producer Thomas Schlamme. The series is about a group of Midwestern youths who spark a second American Revolution. AR2 will explore how the revolting college students -- as well as the military and the law enforcement officers who oppose them -- perceive patriotism. Scheuring lessened his work on Fox's Prison Break to focus on development and features through his Mercator Pictures, which he operates with partner Matt Fiorello. He has also produced Masterwork, a drama pilot script for Fox and 20th TV, and the Inferno-produced feature The Experiment.

Scheuring was also confirmed to be the writer for Halo: Nightfall. A 5 episode series which is based upon the video game franchise connecting the story line between Halo 4 and Halo 5: Guardians

== Filmography ==
Year	Title	Notes
2018	Den of Thieves	Writer
2013	Zero Hour	Creator, writer and executive producer
2010	The Experiment	Writer, director
2010	Mexicali	Writer
2005–2009, 2017	Prison Break	Creator, head staff writer and executive producer of television series. Credited for writing: 1x01, 1x02, 1x09, 1x13, 1x19 (story), 1x22, 2x01, 2x17 (co-written with Karyn Usher), 2x22, 3x01, 5x01, 5x02
2005	Briar & Graves	Creator and writer of television series (unaired)
2003	A Man Apart	Writer
2000	36K	Director, editor and writer
