= Anthony Fleming =

American actor

- Born: Anthony Fleming III
- Occupation: Actor
- Spouse: Kathryn Fleming (m. 2003)
- Children: 1

Anthony Fleming is an American actor who is known for his role as Trumpets on Fox's television series Prison Break and JP Gibbs on Starz's Power Book IV: Force. He also appeared in the film Divergent and in an episode of Chicago Fire. Fleming is active in the Chicago theater scene and has appeared in the play Denmark at the Biograph Theater in Chicago.

== Personal life ==
He has a son, Hunter, with his wife Kathryn.
