= Peter J. Reineman =

American actor

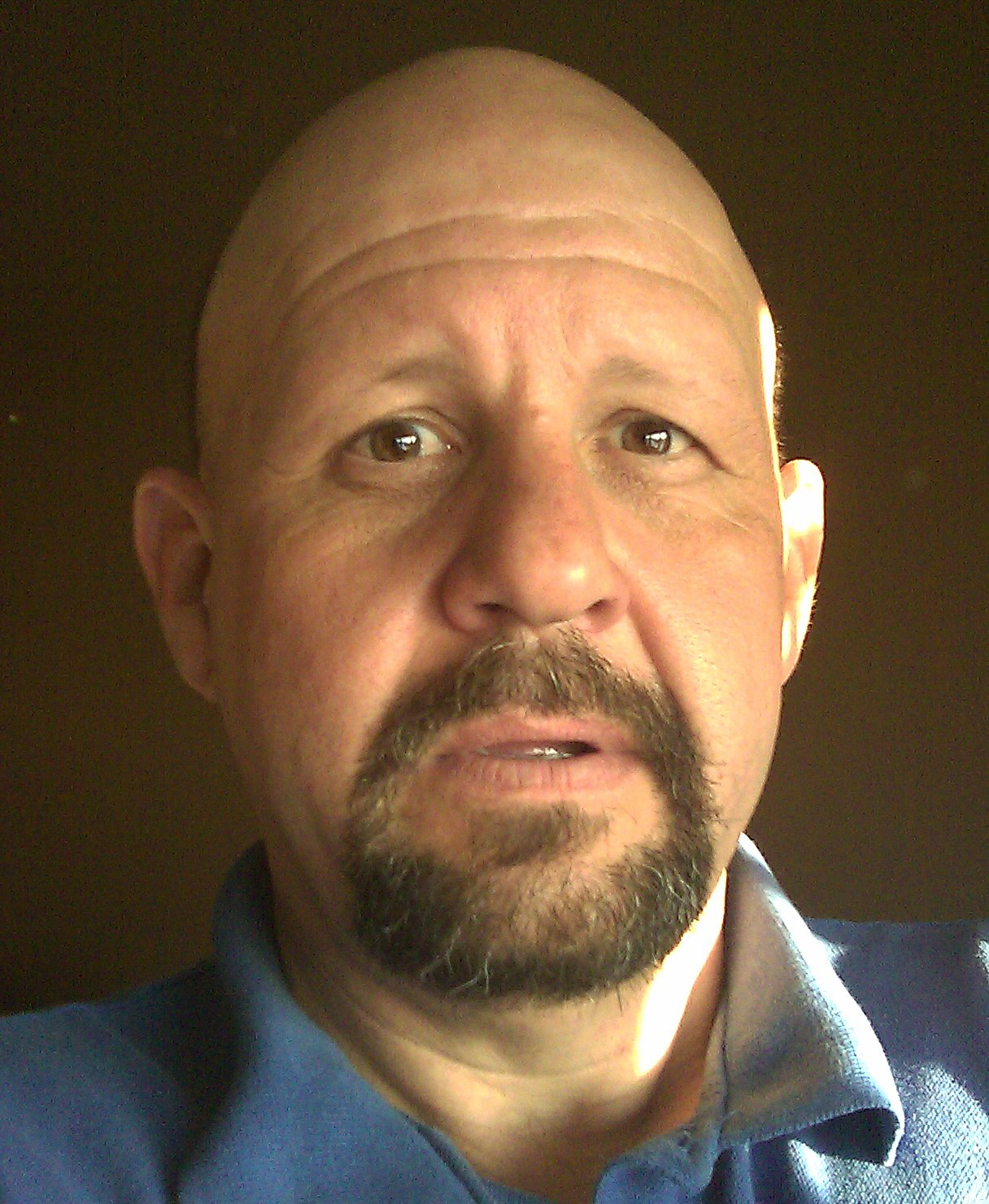
- Reinemann in 2010
- Occupation(s): Television actor, Carpenter

Peter J. Reinemann (also called Peter Reineman or Peter Reinemann) is an American actor. He is best known for playing the role of Gus Fiorello on the show Prison Break.

== Early life and career ==
Peter Reinemann was born in Sheboygan, Wisconsin. He is a graduate of the University of Wisconsin School of Business. In the mid eighties he moved to Chicago where he performed in numerous Chicago theaters doing both drama and improv comedy. Credits include the Improv Olympic, the Curious Theater Branch, Dan Sutherland, and others. He and his family currently live in Chicago.
