= Danny McCarthy =

American actor

Danny McCarthy (born February 9, 1969) is an American actor. He is best known as Agent Danny Hale on Fox series Prison Break (2005–2006).

== Career ==
He has acted in plays with the Steppenwolf Theatre Company and the Famous Door, and has performed twice at the Edinburgh Festival Fringe in Scotland. Other credits include The Amityville Horror, Early Edition, What About Joan, and Alleyball. McCarthy is an ensemble member at A Red Orchid Theatre in Chicago. McCarthy created, together with Alleyball writer/director Dan Consiglio, SOXTALK with Pat and Tony, a series of four 30-minute shows that aired on NBC Sports Chicago. McCarthy starred as "Pat", a longtime know-it-all White Sox supporter. He played Surly Joe's Brother in The Ballad of Buster Scruggs.

== Filmography ==
=== Film ===
Year	Title	Role	Notes
2003	The Company	Bartender	
2005	The Amityville Horror	Officer Greguski	
2005	Proof	Cop	
2005	Derailed	Correctional Officer Hank	
2006	Stranger than Fiction	Demolition Crew #1	
2006	Flags of Our Fathers	Reporter (in Chicago) #1	
2006	Alleyball	Nicholas	
2007	Fred Claus	Salvation Army Santa	
2008	The Express: The Ernie Davis Story	Bill Bell	
2011	Transformers: Dark of the Moon	NEST Guard	
2014	The Drop	Detective Dexter	
2016	Elvis & Nixon	Agent Duncan	
2017	Stronger	Kevin	
2018	The Ballad of Buster Scruggs	Curly Joe's Brother	
2021	Ghostwriter	Sa O'Halloran	Voice
2023	The Exorcist: Believer	Stuart	
2024	Good One	Matt	
2025	Our Hero, Balthazar	Gore	
2025	The Lost Bus	McKenzie	
2025	The Running Man	YVA Manager	
2026	The Debut	Male Testimonial	

=== Television ===
Year	Title	Role	Notes
2004	ER	Firefighter James	Episode: "Drive"
2005–2006	Prison Break	Agent Daniel Hale	14 episodes
2010	Detroit 1-8-7	Spencer Kona	Episode: "Déjà Vu/All In"
2011	The Chicago Code	Glenn	Episode: "Pilot"
2012	Boss	Rick Mathers	2 episodes
2012	Underemployed	Paul	7 episodes
2013	Chicago Fire	Trainer	Episode: "Retaliation Hit"
2013	Killing Kennedy	James P. Hosty	Television film
2013–2014	Betrayal	Detective Mitchell	3 episodes
2014	Boardwalk Empire	Pat Halligan	2 episodes
2014, 2015	Elementary	Detective Nash	2 episodes
2014, 2017	Blue Bloods	Lieutenant / Jerrie Demarest	2 episodes
2018	Chicago P.D.	Mark	Episode: "Profiles"
2019	Instinct	Randy	Episode: "Broken Record"
2022	Somebody Somewhere	Rick	7 episodes
2024	Elsbeth	Agent Fred Celetano	6 episodes
2026	Furious	Ed George	5 episodes
