= Camille Guaty =

American actress (born 1978/1979)

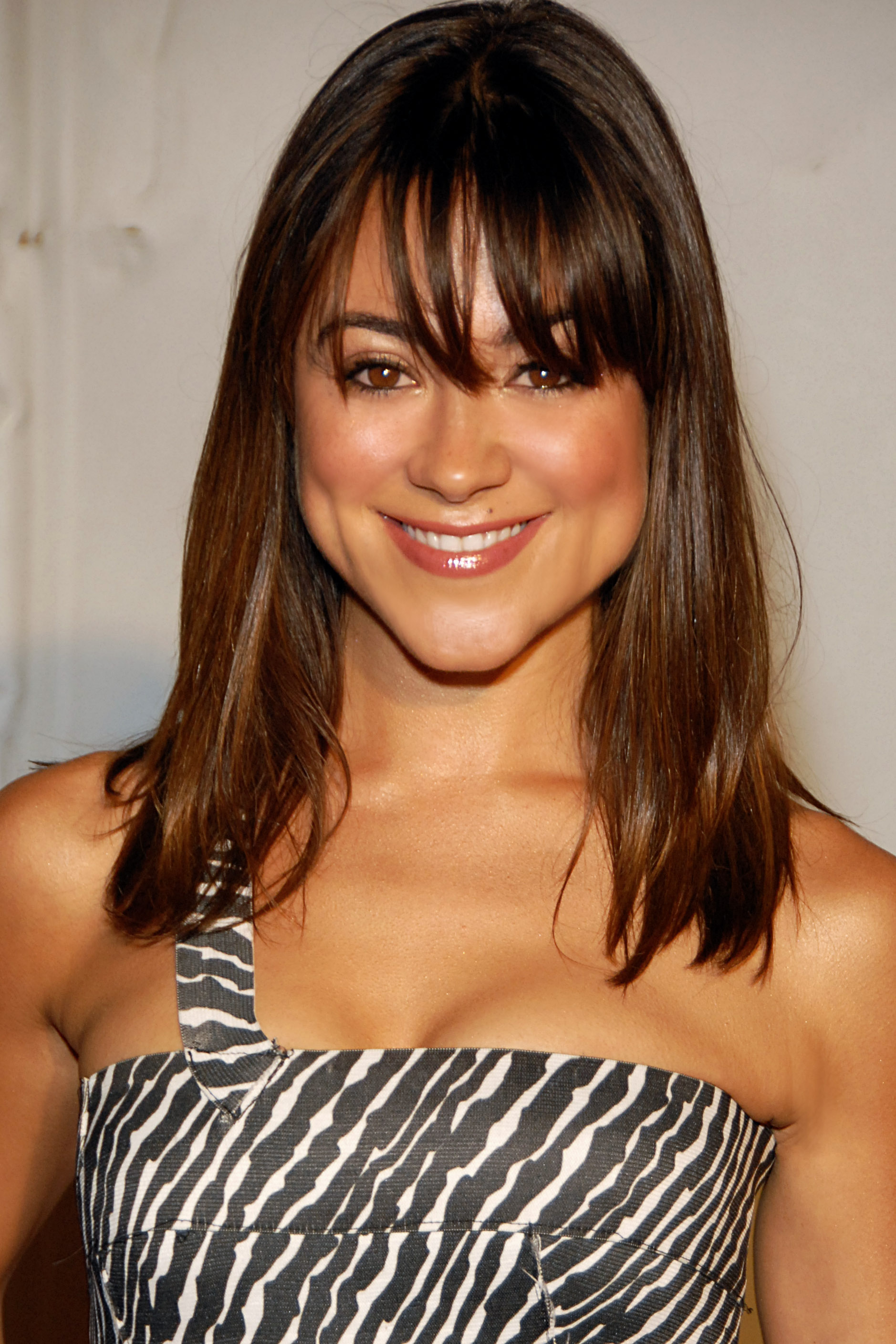
- Guaty at Maxim's 2009 Hot 100 Celebration
- Born: 1978/1979 (age 47–48); Sunnyvale, California, U.S.
- Occupation: Actress
- Years active: 2000–present
- Spouse: Sy Rhys Kaye (m. 2011)
- Children: 1

Camille Guaty-Kaye (born 1978/1979) is an American film and television actress. She portrayed Daisy in Gotta Kick It Up! (2002), Maricruz Delgado, Sucre's girlfriend, in Prison Break (2005–2007), and Walter O'Brien's sister, Megan, on the CBS series Scorpion (2014–2015).

== Early life ==
Guaty was born in Sunnyvale, California and is of Puerto Rican and Cuban descent.

She attended a summer program at the Royal Academy of Dramatic Art in London and studied at Boston University.

== Career ==
=== Singing ===
Camille auditioned for Popstars, a reality TV show that aired on the WB Network in 2000. She made it to the L.A. Workshop that included only the best 26 contestants. In the end, Camille was one of ten semi-finalists and eventually the last contestant not to win a spot as part of the winning girl group Eden's Crush.

=== Acting ===
In 2002, Guaty was the lead in the movie Gotta Kick It Up!, a Disney Channel Original movie. She was the leading role in the short-lived TV series The Help with Mindy Cohn, Megan Fox, and Antonio Sabato Jr.

In 2004, Guaty was the leading lady, Maggie Moreno, in the movie 30 Days Until I'm Famous. She also starred in Crossing Jordan as Det. Luisa Santana in the episodes "Blue Moon" and "Family Affair".

In 2005, Guaty had a recurring role Maricruz Delgado, the girlfriend of Fernando Sucre, in Prison Break. She starred as Franny Rios in ABC's The Nine, and played the role of Alex in The Brothers Garcia.

Guaty was cast as recurring character Piper Nielsen, a new Montecito concierge, in 2007 on NBC's Las Vegas. Guaty has also appeared in Cupid and Ghosts of Girlfriends Past. She appeared in a 2011 episode of The Chicago Code as Elena, as the fiancée of the main character, Jarek Wysocki. She had a recurring role in the TV show Scorpion as Megan O'Brien, the older sister of main character Walter O'Brien.

In 2025, she was part of the main cast of J.J. Abrams's TV show Duster.

== Personal life ==
Guaty is married to British songwriter Sy Rhys Kaye. In August 2019, Guaty announced her pregnancy with the couple's first child with the help of an egg donor. Their son was born in October 2019.

== Filmography ==
=== Film ===
Year	Title	Role	Notes
2000	Chaos Theory		
2003	Love Object	Counter Girl	
2007	Blink	Nicole	
2008	Consuming Love	Sarah	Short
2009	Ghosts of Girlfriends Past	Donna	
2012	Towing	Red	Short
2013	Crush	Mrs. Brown	
2013	The Smile Man	Irene	Short
2014	Cake	Tina	
2015	Stealing	Camille	Short
2017	The Wedding Invitation	Ryann	
2018	A Futile and Stupid Gesture	Alex Garcia-Mata	
2018	The Brownlist	Celeste	Short
2018	Lonely Hearts Club	Cam	
2018	Nappily Ever After	Wendy	
2024	Harold and the Purple Crayon	Junior Detective Silva	
2026	Dark Horse	Michelle Bolsonaro	Filming
20??	My Best Friend Depression	Phoebe	Post-production

=== Television ===
Year	Title	Role	Notes
2001	Popstars	Member of Eden's Crush	Left when she learned about the contract.
2001–02	Raising Dad	Olivia	Recurring role (12 episodes)
2002	Gotta Kick It Up!	Daisy Salinas	TV film
2002	What I Like About You	Liz	Episode: "Spa Day"
2003	ER	Mia	Episode: "When Night Meets Day"
2003	The Brothers García	Alex	Episodes: "Sisters Garcia: Parts 1 & 2", "Models Inc."
2004	American Family	Alicia	TV series
2004	The Help	Maria	Main role (7 episodes)
2004	30 Days Until I'm Famous	Maggie Moreno	TV film
2004	Everwood	Serena	Episode: "The Tipping Point"
2004	Joey	Debbie	Episode: "Joey and the Roadtrip"
2004	Grammercy Park	Maddy Kelly	Unaired ABC pilot
2004–05	Crossing Jordan	Det. Luisa Santana	Episodes: "Blue Moon", "Family Affair"
2005	Sex, Love & Secrets	Andrea	Episode: "Abandonment"
2005–2007	Prison Break	Maricruz Delgado	Recurring role (seasons 1–3)
2006–07	The Nine	Franny Rios	Main role (13 episodes)
2007	Without a Trace	Paula Solis	Episode: "Res Ipsa"
2007	Supreme Courtships	Amber Chavez	Unaired FOX pilot
2007–08	Las Vegas	Piper Nielsen	Recurring role (season 5)
2008	Dirt	Debbie Ann	Episode: "What Is This Thing Called?"
2009	Fear Itself	Karen / Zelda Flemming	Episode: "Echoes"
2009	Cupid	Lita Arroyo	Main role (7 episodes)
2008–2010	Family Guy	Various (voice)	Recurring role (5 episodes)
2009	CSI: Crime Scene Investigation	April Martin	Episode: "Death and the Maiden"
2010	Drop Dead Diva	Wendy Simon	Episode: "Good Grief"
2011	The Chicago Code	Elena	Recurring role (4 episodes)
2011	Friends with Benefits	Katie Finelli	Episode: "Pilot"
2011	Eden	Terri Garza	Episode: "Pilot"
2012	Breakout Kings	Emmy Sharp	Episode: "I Smell Emmy"
2012	Let It Go	Charlie	Unaired FOX pilot
2013	The Vampire Diaries	Caitlin Shane	Episodes: "Into the Wild", "Down the Rabbit Hole"
2013	Armed Response	Kara Sanchez	TV series
2013	How I Met Your Mother	Lisa	Episode: "Bedtime Stories"
2013	Spy	Caitlin Banks	Unaired ABC pilot
2014	Hart of Dixie	Connie Vincent	Episodes: "'Ring of Fire", "Carrying Your Love with Me"
2014	Happyland	Elena Velez	TV miniseries
2014–15	Scorpion	Megan O'Brien	Recurring role (seasons 1–2)
2015	Mix	Lola Ruiz	TV film
2016–17	The Exorcist	Olivia	Episodes: "And Let My Cry Come Unto Thee", "One for Sorrow"
2017	Daytime Divas	Nina Sandoval	Main role (10 episodes)
2018	The Good Doctor	Viola	Episodes: "Quarantine", "Quarantine Part Two"
2018	Get Christie Love	Juana	Unaired ABC pilot
2021	The Rookie	Sandra De La Cruz	Recurring role (5 episodes)
2025	Duster	Izzy Reyna	TV Series
2026	9-1-1: Nashville	Dr. Anita Linn	TV Series
