= Mac Brandt =

American actor

- Born: Chicago, Illinois, U.S.
- Education: Columbia College Chicago
- Occupation: Actor
- Years active: 2004–present
- Television: Prison Break, Kingdom, SEAL Team

Mac Brandt is an American actor best known for his roles as C.O. Mack Andrews on the Fox crime drama Prison Break (2005–2006), and as Mac Sullivan on the Audience Network sports drama Kingdom (2014–2017).

He is a native of the Lombard, Illinois area and a 1998 graduate of Montini Catholic High School, where he served as the president of student government and starting nose guard of the football team. He has a theater degree from Columbia College Chicago.

In 2025, Brandt made his Broadway debut in Good Night, and Good Luck, starring George Clooney and directed by David Cromer, who was Brandt's instructor in college.

== Filmography ==
=== Film ===
Year	Title	Role	Notes
2007	The Art of Stalking	The Cop	Short film
2011	The Family Tree	Young Police Officer	
2013	The List	The Sentry	
2013	Gangster Squad	Bruiser	
2014	Sleeping Dogs Lie	Harlow's Lawyer	Short film
2018	Venom	Jack the Bartender	
2018	Game Over, Man!	Jared	
2018	Elves' Day Off	Santa Claus	Short film
2020	Archenemy	Decker	
2021	No Man of God	Guard Paluger	
2022	To Leslie	Bert	
2022	Grey Elephant	James	
2023	Ambush	Crawdford	
2023	Barbie	Construction Worker	
2024	Joker: Folie à Deux	Arkham Guard	

=== Television ===
Year	Title	Role	Notes
2005–2006	Prison Break	Mack Andrews	15 episodes
2007	The Unit	MP#1	Episode: "The Outsiders"
2007	Without a Trace	Press	Episode: "Lost Boy"
2007	Lincoln Heights	Officer Ferguson	Episode: "Out with a Bang"
2007–2009	Grey's Anatomy	Paramedic 2 / Paramedic 3	4 episodes
2008	Jericho	Medic	Episode: "Condor"
2008	Entourage	Smoke Jumper 2	Episode: "Seth Green Day"
2009	Hammer of the Gods	Baldur	TV film
2009	Mental	Darren Knuth	Episode: "Book of Judges"
2009	Raising the Bar	Officer Tommy Boozang	Episode: "Fine and Dandy"
2009	The Mentalist	Xander	Episode: "Red Menace"
2009	Three Rivers	Mick	Episode: "Good Intentions"
2010	NCIS: Los Angeles	Mick Benelli	Episode: "The Bank Job"
2010	Cold Case	Preston Schmall	Episode: "The Last Drive-In"
2010	Bones	Jesse Wilson	Episode: "The Twisted Bones in the Melted Truck"
2011	The Event	Mall Cop	Episode: "One Will Live, One Will Die"
2011	Harry's Law	Marcus	Episode: "There Will Be Blood"
2011	CSI: Miami	Victor Shetland	Episode: "A Few Dead Men"
2012	CSI: NY	Nathan Brody	Episode: "The Real McCoy"
2013	Hawaii Five-0	Craig Brant	Episode: "Hoa Pili"
2013	Hello Ladies	Drunk Dude	Episode: "The Limo"
2013	NCIS	Jake Spoke	Episode: "Once a Crook"
2013	The List	The Sentry	TV film
2013–2019	Arrested Development	Coast Guard Phil / Coast Guardsman	6 episodes
2014	The 100	Tor Lemkin	Episode: "Twilight's Last Gleaming"
2014	Gang Related	Warren Davis	Episode: "Entre dos tierras"
2014	Hot in Cleveland	Mac	Episode: "Win Win"
2014–2017	Kingdom	Mac Sullivan	
2015	Castle	Jeremy	Episode: "Castle, P.I."
2015	Chasing Life	Vance Madill	Episode: "One Day"
2015	Scandal	Captain Weaver	Episode: "A Few Good Women"
2015	Major Crimes	Kenny	Episode: "Fifth Dynasty"
2015–2017	The Night Shift	Mac Reily	7 episodes
2016	Rizzoli and Isles	Wally Johnson	Episode: "Murderjuana"
2016	Longmire	Duncan Butler	2 episodes
2016	Supernatural	Bucky Sims	Episode: "Celebrating the Life of Asa Fox"
2016	General Hospital	Gene	2 episodes
2017	Colony	Sgt. Jenkins	6 episodes
2017	Grimm	Ralph Rotterman	Episode: "Tree People"
2017	APB	Vic Evans	
2017	Curb Your Enthusiasm	Truck Driver	Episode: "A Disturbance in the Kitchen"
2017	Valor	Crank Hendrix	6 episodes
2018	S.W.A.T.	Harley Stone	Episode: "Contamination"
2018	Reverie	Drew Sullivan	Episode: "The Black Mandala"
2018	FBI	Brick Peters	Episode: "Pilot"
2019	For the People	Agent Marin	Episode: "This Is America"
2019	Elementary	Patrick Meers	2 episodes
2019	Animal Kingdom	Swenson	Episode: "Ambo"
2019	Black Jesus	Jake Whiteman	Episode: "God's Team"
2019–2022	9-1-1	Eli Cobb	3 episodes
2020	Station 19	Agent Baxter	Episode: "No Days Off"
2020	Lovecraft Country	Captain Seamus Lancaster	5 episodes
2020	Shameless	Sgt. Ruger	Episode: "This Is Chicago"
2021	NCIS: New Orleans	Roland McCann	Episode: "Stashed"
2022	The Thing About Pam	Detective Ryan McCarrick	5 episodes
2022	Chicago Fire	Dell Cotner	2 episodes
2022	Dahmer – Monster: The Jeffrey Dahmer Story	Officer Rauth / Robert Rauth	2 episodes
2022	The Cleaning Lady	Jon Price	3 episodes
2022	Criminal Minds	Hal Sparks	Episode: "Moose"
2023	Law & Order: Organized Crime	Lloyd Bloom	Episode: "Pareto Principle"
2023	Winning Time: The Rise of the Lakers Dynasty	Joe Bird	Episode: "The Second Coming"
2023	For All Mankind	Tom Parker	Episode: "Glasnost"

=== Video games ===
Year	Title	Role
2011	Killzone 3	Kowalski
2012	XCOM: Enemy Unknown	Soldier
2016	Firewatch	Ned Goodwin
2019	Days Gone	Additional voices
