= Phillip Edward Van Lear =

American actor

- Born: Aurora, Illinois, U.S.
- Occupation: Actor
- Years active: 1992–present
- Children: 3

Phillip Edward Van Lear is an American actor. He is known for playing C.O. Louis Patterson on the Fox series Prison Break.

== Early life ==
Van Lear was born in Aurora, Illinois in 1951

== Career ==
He has also played in various other movies such as: Barbershop 2: Back in Business, Magic Mike, Chicago Cab, Night of the Lawyers, A Family Thing and Thieves Quartet. He also starred alongside Oprah Winfrey, in the film There Are No Children Here, where he plays a thug and a vandal hell-bent on corrupting youth for his own personal gain. He was originally cast to play Ray Charles in the movie Ray, but Jamie Foxx ended up with the role when funding for the movie he was filming fell through. Van Lear spent all of 2004 in the Cameroon on a spiritual journey. He is the father of three, Nathaniel, Tasha and Ethan.
