= Marshall Allman =

American actor (born 1984)

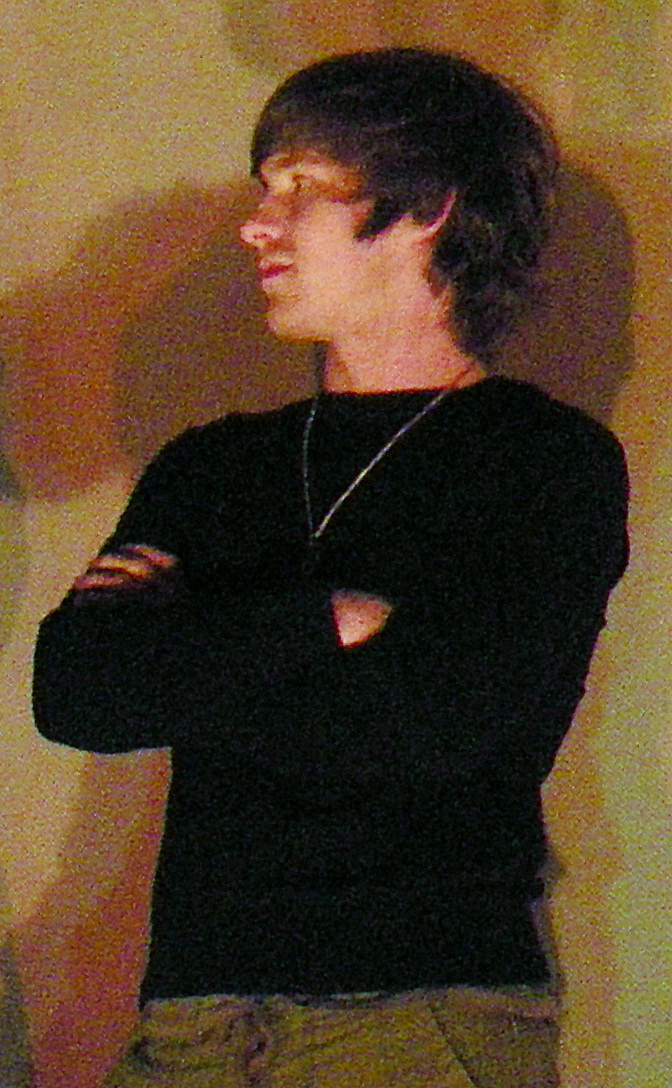
- Allman at the May 2009 Seattle International Film Festival
- Born: Marshall Scot Allman; April 5, 1984 (age 42); Texas, U.S.
- Occupation: Actor
- Years active: 2003–present
- Spouse: Jamie Anne Brown (m. 2006)
- Children: 3

Marshall Scot Allman (born April 5, 1984) is an American actor. He is known to television audiences for his role as L. J. Burrows on the Fox television series Prison Break. He is also known for playing Tommy Mickens on True Blood.

== Early life ==
Allman was born in Texas, the son of Idanell (née Brown) and James Martin Allman Jr. As he grew up he was talented in soccer and art. Allman played club and school soccer and is deeply interested in contemporary music. After graduating from Austin High School in 2002, he chose to pursue an acting career in Los Angeles over studying art in New York City. Allman is a Christian, and in an interview he stated, "Any time someone tries to represent their idea of God it's paramount to remember that you're an imperfect person leading a flawed life."

== Personal life ==
Allman married American actress Jamie Anne Allman (née Brown) of Parsons, Kansas on June 17, 2006, in Austin, Texas. They have twins who were born in 2013.

== Career ==
Allman has also made guest appearances on shows such as Without a Trace, Boston Public, Malcolm in the Middle, The Practice, Law & Order: Special Victims Unit, Phil of the Future, Close to Home, Cold Case, Saving Grace, Eli Stone, Grey's Anatomy, Mad Men, Bates Motel, and The Closer. In November 2009, Allman won the role of Tommy Mickens in the third season of True Blood. Allman has also done voice over work, such as on Breathe Bible. Allman's film credits include Shallow Ground, Little Black Book, Dishdogz and The Immaculate Conception of Little Dizzle.

== Filmography ==
=== Films ===
Year	Film	Role	Notes
2004	Shallow Ground	Victim #3	
2004	Little Black Book	Trotsky	
2005	Dishdogz	Kevin	
2005	Hostage	Kevin Kelly	
2008	Winged Creatures	Bellhop / Clerk	New title: Fragments
2009	Anytown	Mike Grossman	
2009	The Immaculate Conception of Little Dizzle	Dory	
2012	Jayne Mansfield's Car	Alan Caldwell	
2012	Blue Like Jazz	Donald Miller	
2013	Sugar	Marshall	
2015	A Year and Change	Victor	
2016	Six LA Love Stories	Pete Rouget	
2018	Thunder Road	Phil	
2020	The Wolf of Snow Hollow	Jeremy	
2023	A Great Divide	Wyatt Schlang	

=== Television ===
Year	Title	Role	Notes
2003	Malcolm In The Middle	Dylan	Episode: Thanksgiving
2005–2009	Prison Break	LJ Burrows	49 episodes
2010–2011	True Blood	Tommy Mickens	22 episodes
2016	Bates Motel	Julian Howe	4 episodes
2016–2018	Humans	Milo Khoury	

==== Guest ====
Year	Title	Role	Notes
2003	Without a Trace	Mark	Episode: "Revelations"
2003	Married to the Kellys	Young Tom	Episode: "Pilot"
2003	Threat Matrix	Teen Boy	Episode: "Natural Borne Killers"
2003	Boston Public	Hector	Episode: "Chapter Seventy"
2003	Malcolm in the Middle	Dylan	Episode: "Thanksgiving"
2004	The Practice	Todd Beck	Episode: "Police State"
2005	Phil of the Future	Roger	Episode: "Milkin' It"
2006	Close to Home	Billy Hampton	Episode: "Hot Grrrl"
2007	Cold Case	James Hoffman	Episode: "Knuckle Up"
2007	CSI: Crime Scene Investigation	Jonathan Alaniz	Episode: "Empty Eyes"
2007	Saving Grace	Wade Tyrell	Episode: "Keep Your Damn Wings Off My Nephew"
2008	Ghost Whisperer	Thomas Benjamin	Episode: "Slam"
2008	Grey's Anatomy	Jeremy West	Episode: "Freedom"
2008	The Closer	Kevin Ward	Episode: "Cherry Bomb"
2008	Law & Order: Special Victims Unit	Eric Byers	Episode: "Confession"
2008	Eli Stone	JJ Cooper	Episode: "The Humanitarian"; Episode: "Happy Birthday, Nate"
2009	Life	Clifton Garber	Episode: "Canyon Flowers"
2009	Mad Men	Danny Farrell	Episode: "The Color Blue"
2009	It's Always Sunny in Philadelphia	Bezzy	Episode: "The Gang Reignites the Rivalry"
2010	Men of a Certain Age	Travis	Episode: "Powerless"
2011	CSI: Miami	Kevin Bowers	Episode: Sinner Takes All
2012	Justified	Donovan	Episodes: "Guy Walks into a Bar" and "Measures"
2012	Sons of Anarchy	Devon	Episode: "Orca Shrugged"
2013	Longmire	Kellen Daves	Episode: "Election Day"
2015	iZombie	Chad Wolcoff	Episode: "Zombie Bro"
2016	Rosewood	Ben Kapono	Episode: "Prosopagnosia & Parrotfish"
2017	Chance	Pruitt	Episode: "Especially If You Run Away"
2018	NCIS	Donnie	Episode: "High Tide"
2019	For the People	Herbert Brooks	Episode: "You Belong Here"

=== Telefilm ===
Year	Title	Role	Notes
2013	Filthy Sexy Teen$	Nick	

=== Video games ===
Year	Title	Role	Notes
2016	Quantum Break	Charlie Wincott	

=== Short ===
Year	Title	Role	Notes
2005	Starcrossed	Connor	
2005	Sweet Pea	Ricky	
2007	A Day with the Urns	Bob	
2009	Love After Life	Unknown role	

== Music videos ==
- Drowning by Crazy Town from the album Darkhorse, 2002
