= Disconnect (Prison Break) =

- Prison Break episode
- Episode no.: Season 2 Episode 12
- Directed by: Karen Gaviola
- Written by: Nick Santora; Karyn Usher
- Production code: 2AKJ12
- Original air date: November 20, 2006

Guest appearances
- Anthony Denison as Aldo Burrows; Helena Klevorn as Dede Franklin; Cynthia Kaye McWilliams as Kacee Franklin; Justin Meeks as Pilot; Dylan Minnette as Young Michael; Reggie Lee as Bill Kim; Romy Rosemont as Kathryn Slattery; José Zúñiga as Coyote

Episode chronology
← Previous "Bolshoi Booze"	Next → "The Killing Box"
- Prison Break (season 2)

"Disconnect" is the thirty-fourth episode of the American television series Prison Break and is the twelfth episode of its second season. Aired on November 20, 2006, it was also one of the episodes that were aired during the 2006 sweeps in the United States. The episode is written by Nick Santora & Karyn Usher, and directed by Karen Gaviola.

Both Marshall Allman (who plays L. J. Burrows) and Robert Knepper (who plays Theodore "T-Bag" Bagwell) did not appear in this episode but a flashback of T-Bag from the previous episode was used. The events in this episode directly follow that of the previous episode, which takes place on June 4.

== Summary ==
C-Note (Rockmond Dunbar), his wife and daughter are relaxing in an RV, at a Harvey, North Dakota lakeside. When his daughter, Deedee (Helena Klevorn), is in need of her dexamethasone medicine, C-Note and his wife, Kacee (Cynthia Kaye McWilliams), risk public exposure in order to retrieve the medicine. However, Kacee is recognized by the pharmacist, and is later arrested by the Harvey police but not before she makes eye contact with C-Note and drops the medicine in a nearby trash receptacle.

In New Mexico, Sara Tancredi (Sarah Wayne Callies) remains submerged in the motel bathtub as Agent Paul Kellerman (Paul Adelstein) unwraps a body bag and a hack saw. After a visit from the motel attendant about the noise coming from his bathroom and television, Kellerman returns to the bathroom to an empty bathtub. Sara catches Kellerman by surprise and burns his chest with an iron. She jumps out the window and smashes into a car windshield below. Wounded, Sara hides in a public restroom and stitches her own wounds while wincing in pain.

After Kellerman lies about Sara's death, Agent Kim (Reggie Lee) has his subordinate erase Kellerman from all of the government records. When Kellerman calls Caroline Reynolds' office, he is told that the administration does not know his name. He tries to call Kim, pleading "Bill, don't do this", as Kim tells his subordinate "Make him a ghost".

Brad Bellick (Wade Williams) is investigated about Roy Geary's death by Detective Katherine Slattery (Romy Rosemont) inside a Tribune, Kansas police station. After Bellick evades her questions, Slattery replies that she doesn't care about what they were doing, she just wants to know the truth about what happened. Bellick finally tells her that they were tracking down Theodore Bagwell but does not mention Charles Westmoreland's money. Eventually, she is given the credit card receipt with Bellick's name on it found at the crime scene, as well as a copy of Bellick's death threat left on Geary's voice mail. Circumstantial evidence overwhelming, Slattery places Bellick under arrest for the first degree murder of Geary, despite his assertion of innocence and that he was somehow framed by T-Bag for the crime.

Michael Scofield (Wentworth Miller) is distraught when his brother Lincoln Burrows (Dominic Purcell) introduces Aldo Burrows (Anthony Denison) as his father. Michael announces that he knows Aldo. He recalls a childhood memory when he sustained child abuse at the hands of a foster parent. Aldo killed the man, which affected Michael greatly. This flashback also explains the source of Michael's low latent inhibition (which enabled him to formulate and execute the escape plan) and low self-worth (which is what made him go to such extreme lengths to help his brother in the first place), both of which were first alluded to in the first season episode "Tweener".

Aldo continues to explain to Michael about "The Company" but their gathering is interrupted by Agent Alexander Mahone (William Fichtner), who begins firing at them. Aldo is shot but escapes. However, Aldo dies in Michael's arms after telling his sons to find Sara Tancredi, who he believes can save Lincoln. Michael and Lincoln bury Aldo by the roadside. Along with Sucre (Amaury Nolasco), they head to the airplane rendezvous point but tell Sucre that they will stay behind and that they are through with running. Michael's parting words to Sucre are, "Fly safe, papi". A grinning Sucre replies, "Give 'em hell."

Agent Mahone phones the authorities, instructing them to "put an alarm out on a dark blue sedan. License: AE9268. 40 miles southeast of Las Cruces, New Mexico". He then goes to St. De Lorenzo Hospital in Carlsbad, New Mexico to meet with the coyote who tried to ambush Michael in the previous episode, "Bolshoi Booze". The coyote attempts to negotiate with Mahone for the location of the airfield, but Mahone quickly loses patience and proceeds to disconnect the coyote's medical equipment. Mahone discovers the location of the airfield and the time of the flight, and orders that the plane (an A36 Beech) to be shot down by military jets from a nearby Navy Reserve Airstation.

With Mahone behind them, Michael makes a desperate attempt to contact Sara on her cell phone while close to a transmission tower. As they set out to find a transmission tower, they notice what appear to be fighter jets and assume they are going after Sucre. Eventually Sara answers the telephone, but not before Mahone smashes his Ford Crown Victoria into Michael and Lincoln's car, causing a fire and totalling both cars but not seriously injuring anyone. Exhausted but madly determined, Mahone aims his gun at the brothers just as Michael's phone, thrown clear of the crash, connects to Sara's.

== Reception ==
On November 20, 2006, the show attained one of its largest audience since the second season premiere with an estimated 9.2 million viewers, which also improved on last week's viewer ratings. It also achieved its best rating in the 18-49 demographic since its season premiere in August with a 4.0 rating, finishing second in its timeslot behind NBC's Deal or No Deal.

As the show follows multiple characters, some critics commented on the diverging plots of those characters. A critic from Entertainment Weekly stated that although the storyline between Agents Kim and Kellerman was necessary, it was "Boring? Beyond words." A similar comment was made by a reviewer from TV Guide about C-Note's plot. The reviewer stated that she is "just not that invested in his story" because his character is completely cut off from the rest of the escapees and that he is less of a compelling character than T-Bag, who also has a separate plot. On the other aspects of the episode, the critic from the Arizona Daily Star commended the episode's pre-credits sequence, saying that "'Prison Break' is now at the top of the list for sheer shock value and tight storytelling". The pre-credits sequence involved the first five minutes of the episode which was about Michael's past and Sara's escape from Kellerman. There were also comments about the main turning point of Michael and Lincoln's plot as they decide to stop running. The critic from IGN commented that this "changes the direction of the show completely, and should provide fans with even more exciting dramatic possibilities in future episodes". However, the critic from the Arizona Daily Star disagrees, saying that the brother's decision to stay "was a dumb choice".

Overall, the episode received a 9.8/10 rating from IGN and a B+ grade from The San Diego Union-Tribune, whose critic also stated that it was "an eventful episode".

This episode was nominated for two Golden Reel Awards in the categories of "Best Sound Editing in Music for Television - Short Form" and "Best Sound Editing in Sound Effects and Foley for Television - Short Form".
