= Chicago (Prison Break) =

- Prison Break episode
- Episode no.: Season 2 Episode 16
- Directed by: Jesse Bochco
- Written by: Nick Santora &; Matt Olmstead
- Production code: 2AKJ16
- Original air date: February 5, 2007

Guest appearances
- Danielle Campbell as Gracey Hollander; Kaley Cuoco as Sasha; Jason Davis as Agent Wheeler; K. K. Dodds as Susan Hollander; Carole Farabee as Patty Wallace; Helena Klevorn as Dede Franklin; Reggie Lee as Bill Kim; Silas Weir Mitchell as Charles "Haywire" Patoshik; Channon Roe as Robber; Cara Serber as Woman; Quinn Wermeling as Zack Hollander

Episode chronology
← Previous "The Message"	Next → "Bad Blood"
- Prison Break (season 2)

"Chicago" is the thirty-eighth episode of the American television series Prison Break and is the sixteenth episode of its second season. It was written by Nick Santora and Matt Olmstead, and directed by Jesse Bochco. The episode first aired on February 5, 2007, making it the first episode to be aired during the February sweeps in the United States. It attained an average of 10.1 million viewers, which is the highest recorded audience for the second season.

The premise of this episode covers Michael Scofield and Lincoln Burrows' journey to Chicago with Sara Tancredi and Paul Kellerman. Other subplots include that of Agent Mahone, Bellick, T-Bag, C-Note and Haywire. In regard to the casting for this particular episode, regular cast member Amaury Nolasco (who plays Sucre) does not appear.

== Plot ==
At an Evansville, Indiana train station, Sara Tancredi (Sarah Wayne Callies) reunites with Michael Scofield (Wentworth Miller) and the two embrace. Sara also greets Michael's brother, Lincoln Burrows (Dominic Purcell) but also finds Paul Kellerman (Paul Adelstein) with them as he secretly converses with President Caroline Reynolds (Patricia Wettig) by mobile phone from around a corner. Michael strangles Kellerman while Lincoln holds him down, after finding out that Kellerman had tried to kill Sara. When they let go of him, Kellerman tells the group that he recognizes Sara's key as being from a private cigar club in Chicago, Illinois.

Kellerman successfully deceives the train conductor by explaining that Michael is a fugitive, and he needs an empty train to transport him to Chicago. In the meantime, Lincoln thanks Sara for helping them and assures her that Kellerman is a temporary ally. On the train, Sara is struggling with flashbacks of her ordeal with Kellerman. After noticing that Lincoln was asleep, Sara sends Michael away on a fool's errand to get water for her. Once he leaves, she gets behind Kellerman and attempts to strangle him with a cord from her sweatshirt; a makeshift garrote. Lincoln and Michael stop her and save Kellerman.

Wanting to be alone, Sara stays in the train car restroom. Kellerman calls the President, who promises him a job as "Chief of Staff". Michael enters the bathroom and talks to Sara. She asks him if he really believes they can "get it all back" and he replies that he has faith, and that it's kept him going the whole time. Sara says that she's motivated by justice for her father and her feelings for Michael. They kiss but are interrupted by a police rail block.

After running through the police rail block, the group of four has apparently jumped off the train. A police force chases the group, until their path is blocked by a helicopter. The group turns out to be the conductor and others, who explained that the real group of fugitives told them to jump off the train at gunpoint, to keep running, and not to look back. As Michael, Lincoln, Sara, and Kellerman leave the train without incident, Kellerman finds a car, and is again contacted by the president. Kellerman asks her what they did during his 35th birthday. When the voice on the other line cannot answer the question, Kellerman realizes that she is not actually the President. He says, "Hey. Whoever this is ... tell Bill Kim that he just screwed up ... big-time."

In Chicago, Kellerman offers to go to the cigar club with the key as he is not a "wanted fugitive". Michael and Sara go together instead. As they enter the club, Michael admits his feelings for Sara.

In Ness City, Kansas, T-Bag (Robert Knepper) forces his hostages, Susan Hollander (K. K. Dodds) and her children, to pretend that they are a family. A neighbour, Patty, arrives at the Hollander household. When Susan's son, Zach, attempts to take Patty aside to explain that they're being held hostage, T-Bag silently threatens Zach with his gun. Wary of their neighbours, T-Bag forces the Hollander family to leave the house with him.

In Benson, Minnesota, C-Note (Rockmond Dunbar) is at a diner with his daughter, Dede, where she is unable to digest her food and vomits in the bathroom. As C-Note prepares to leave the diner, an armed robber enters and attempts to rob the customers. C-Note attempts to defuse the situation by telling the hostages to stay in one corner and give the robber their money. After the diner robber acquires the money, he tries to take a young woman with him as the police approaches. C-Note saves the woman and in return for his good deed, the hostages help C-Note and Dede escape when the police arrived.

At the Federal Bureau of Investigation Chicago Field Office, Agent Wheeler (Jason Davis) reports to Agent Alexander Mahone (William Fichtner) that Haywire has killed a man in Wisconsin. When Mahone says to let the Madison, Wisconsin FBI office handle Haywire and to continue focusing on the brothers, Wheeler tells him that he will report back to the headquarters. Agent William Kim (Reggie Lee) phones Mahone and orders him to kill Haywire because he was Scofield's cellmate and there's no telling what he may know about the conspiracy.

Mahone returns to Fox River State Penitentiary where he tells Brad Bellick (Wade Williams) that since the prosecution violated his rights, the murder charge will be dropped upon a Habeas corpus hearing. However, in order for that to happen, Mahone wants his help to track down the fugitives like a "junkyard dog". Bellick complies. After Bellick is released from prison, he is given a car, a file with his name on it, along with a firearm and a badge.

On an Algoma, Wisconsin shore, Haywire (Silas Weir Mitchell) tries to make his escape on his makeshift boat with his Border Collie. Bellick arrives in Algoma and interrogates Sasha. After finding out where Haywire is, Bellick reports to Mahone. Bellick heads to the location and as he closes in on him, Haywire climbs up a silo. Mahone arrives and is angry at a surprised Bellick for not stopping a large crowd from gathering to watch Haywire climb up the silo. Mahone climbs up the silo to meet Haywire. Due to the crowd, he has to devise an alternative plan to kill Haywire. He decides to talk with him. After sympathizing with his situation, he ends up giving Haywire some subtle prodding to make him think there is only one way out. Mahone stands back as Haywire jumps to his death in dramatic slow motion.

== Production details ==
The episode was filmed in downtown Greenville, Texas and in areas near Greenville. Although the filming was scheduled to begin on December 13, 2006, it was delayed to December 15, 2006. The action sequence, which involved the train crashing into police cars, was also delayed to January 8, 2007 and was filmed in an area just north of Greenville.

== Music ==
The song that was used to link the scene where T-Bag leaves Ness City with the Hollanders and the following scene with C-Note in the diner is "Give Me Just a Little More Time". Towards the end of the episode where Haywire falls to his death, the song playing is "Home" by Alexi Murdoch. Another Murdoch song, "Orange Sky", was played during the Prison Break episode "English, Fitz, or Percy".

== Reception ==
Prison Break continued to be placed second in the Monday 8:00pm timeslot behind NBC's Deal or No Deal in total viewers and the key demographic of adults 18-49. This episode achieved a 6.4% household rating and a 9% household share with an average of 10.1 million viewers, which is the highest recorded audience so far for the second season.

Despite obtaining one of the series' highest recorded audience, the episode received moderate responses from some critics. A critic from UGO, Troy Rogers, gave "Chicago" a B grade, saying that "some aspects of the show are starting to feel tired". Similarly, Craig Blanchard of the San Diego Union-Tribune also gave the episode a B grade. Although Blanchard complimented on the characterization of Kellerman, describing him as "the man with a bottomless bag of tricks", he also commented on the character of Bellick, saying that "it's only a matter of time before Bellick is back to his role as a bottom-feeder. Talk about a riches-to-rags-to-riches story. He's even got a badge now." Peter Brown from IFMagazine gave the episode a B+ grade, saying, "The serve of the week wasn’t as good as some of previous twists with the train jumpers but still continues a nice little tactic of giving the viewers something each week that stays true to what made this series good." The episode received an overall rating of 9.2/10 from IGN's Ahsan Haque, who commented that "this episode continues the trend of bombarding viewers with extremely fast-paced and self-contained storylines for an ever-dwindling cast of characters".

Jeff Commings of Arizona Daily Star commented on the various subplots of the episode and says, "That’s more action than I see in a year, but probably not as much as Jack Bauer sees in an hour. Yes, it stretches credibility, but it still has some great moments." Jeff of TV Fodder reviewed the episode and also commented on the action sequence, stating, "The train escape was brilliant I think. Scofield is back in the driver's seat and running the show." On the other hand, Entertainment Weekly's Kate Sullivan described the protagonists' trip to Chicago as "sketchy". Sullivan also noted that the episode contained the "moment fans have been waiting for — perhaps more than the escape, more than the moment when the whole conspiracy will blow up — was Sara and Michael's reunion".
