= Karyn Usher =

American television producer and writer

Karyn Usher is an American television producer and writer. She produced twenty-four episodes for the television series Prison Break, and additionally wrote twelve episodes, rising from co-producer to co-executive producer on the series' four-season run. She also wrote episodes of the series One Tree Hill and long-running series Bones, where she served as co-executive producer for 45 episodes. In 2010, she signed an overall deal with 20th Century Fox Television, writing and executive producing a Fox CIA drama starring Angela Bassett and Julian McMahon in 2011. On June 20, 2013, Hulu aired YA pilot Delirium written and executive produced by Usher, starring Emma Roberts and directed by Rodrigo Garcia.

In 2016, Usher and Lisa Zwerling signed a multi-year overall television deal with Lionsgate to develop and produce original scripted programming through their new company, Carpool Entertainment. Usher and Zwerling had previously worked together at John Wells Productions before reuniting to form the company. At Lionsgate, along with Carpool Entertainment VP of Development Amanda Tudesco, they developed projects at AMC, HBO, Showtime and Hulu. Usher and Zwerling also executive produced the spy thriller series The Rook, starring Emma Greenwell, Adrien Lester, Joely Richardson and Olivia Munn and shot in London, UK via their Carpool Entertainment production company. It aired on Starz in the U.S. and across Liberty Global's international platforms in 2019.

In 2019, Usher and Zwerling's Carpool Entertainment signed a deal Universal Television, a division of NBCUniversal Content Studios. From there, they went on to write and executive produce limited series 56 Days, produced by Amazon MGM Studios and James Wan's Atomic Monster based on Catherine Ryan Howard's 2021 bestseller of the same title. The series, starring Dove Cameron, Avan Jogia, Karla Souza and Dorian Crossmond Missick received mixed reviews from critics but a warm audience reception, quickly rising to the No.1 position globally on the Amazon platform five days after its release on February 18, 2026.

== Prison Break (14 episodes) ==
- 1.07 - Riots, Drills, and the Devil (written)
- 1.12 - Odd Man Out (written)
- 1.17 - J-Cat (written)
- 1.18 - Bluff (co-written with Nick Santora)
- 2.05 - Map 1213 (written)
- 2.10 - Rendezvous (written)
- 2.12 - Disconnect (co-written with Nick Santora)
- 2.15 - The Message (co-written with Zack Estrin)
- 2.17 - Bad Blood (co-written with Paul Scheuring)
- 2.19 - Sweet Caroline (written)
- 3.05 - Interference (written)
- 3.09 - Boxed In (written)
- 4.04 - Eagles & Angels (written)
- 4.10 - The Legend (written)
