= Panama (Prison Break) =

- Prison Break episode
- Episode no.: Season 2 Episode 20
- Directed by: Vincent Misiano
- Written by: Zack Estrin
- Production code: 2AKJ20
- Original air date: March 12, 2007

Guest appearances
- Kim Coates as Richard Sullins; Jason Davis as Agent Wheeler; Barbara Eve Harris as Felicia Lang; Helena Klevorn as Dede Franklin; Reggie Lee as Bill Kim; Cynthia Kaye McWilliams as Kacee Franklin; Alex Meneses as Chi Chi; Leon Russom as General

Episode chronology
← Previous "Sweet Caroline"	Next → "Fin Del Camino"
- Prison Break (season 2)

"Panama" is the 42nd episode of the American television series Prison Break and is the 20th episode of its second season. The episode aired on March 12, 2007. The plot features the protagonists' escape to Panama while subplots include that of Sara Tancredi, Brad Bellick, Fernando Sucre, Theodore "T-Bag" Bagwell, Alexander Mahone and Benjamin Miles "C-Note" Franklin. Regarding the casting of this episode, Paul Adelstein (who plays Paul Kellerman) does not appear in this episode. This is Benjamin Miles "C-Note" Franklin's last appearance until Rates of Exchange in season 4.

== Summary ==
The bag containing Charles Westmoreland's millions is passed from hand to hand at the Mexico City International Airport. The chain of custody ends with T-Bag (Robert Knepper). When the airport employee asks T-Bag about the contents of the bag, T-Bag simply gives him a 20 dollar bill and tells him it's none of his business.

Fernando Sucre (Amaury Nolasco) and Brad Bellick (Wade Williams) are also in the airport. When the three cross paths, T-Bag runs, takes a taxi cab, and rides away. Sucre runs after the cab and tells T-Bag that he really needs the money. Sucre is able to grab the luggage tags, while T-Bag tells the driver to drive faster.

When Bellick balks at the luggage tags being shown to him by Sucre and threatens his freedom, Sucre grabs Bellick's gun. Bellick replies that he has Maricruz in a hiding place, with enough food to last for only three weeks. Although he accuses Bellick of bluffing, Bellick produces Maricruz' rosary as proof, and Sucre realizes that he has no choice but to work for Bellick.

Bellick and Sucre go to the Mexico City Department of Tourist building. The man at the desk insists that there is no record of Erik Stammel. Sucre tells the agent in Spanish that he does not like "that gringo" (Bellick) either, but if he cannot find Stammel, then a loved one will die. The man at the desk appears to agree to apprise Sucre of any updates to T-Bag's whereabouts. He later calls Bellick's cell phone, who passes the phone to Sucre. Sucre informs Bellick that T-Bag is en route to Panama City.

T-Bag and a sex worker (Alex Meneses) are making out. When the hour is up, the sex worker wants her money, T-Bag wants her to stay. He's been having her pretend to be Susan, T-Bag's ex. The sex worker wants her money. T-Bag prepares to pay her and insults her. The sex worker replies saying it's no wonder why Susan left him, calling Susan a "bitch." She attempts to leave, but T-Bag blocks her exit. She threatens to scream if he doesn't move. In anger T-Bag strangles her to death.

A maid later enters T-Bag's hotel room, picks up the wig with a look of disgust on her face. The maid then sees the dead body of the sex worker. T-Bag is on his way out of the hotel with his money, but is spotted by a Mexican police officer. He attempts to escape.

FBI Internal Affairs Agent Richard Sullins (Kim Coates) is in an interrogation room with Agent Wheeler (Jason Davis) Sullins presents a deal to C-Note (Rockmond Dunbar); his eighteen-year sentence (his original sentence in addition to penalties related to the escape) would become eighteen months.

C-Note balks at the offer, noting that the last time an offer was made to him, there was a string attached which he was to be hung at the end of. He further reasons that with Mahone's connections, he would not last eighteen days in custody and holds firm on his demand of being a free man. As C-Note calls for the guard to take him back to his cell, Sullins then offers no jail time, in addition to Witness Protection Program coverage for him and his family. C-Note agrees.

C-Note is later taken out of his cell, where he meets Kacee, Dede, and Richard Sullins. Sullins hands C-Note an envelope containing information pertaining to his new identity, as he advises C-Note to stay out of trouble and to attend the court dates. C-Note leaves the Cook County Correctional Facility with his wife and daughter.

Michael Scofield (Wentworth Miller) and Lincoln Burrows (Dominic Purcell) are aboard a freighter docked in Chicago, Illinois bound for Panama.

Sara Tancredi (Sarah Wayne Callies) is en route to the docks, as she hears about President Caroline Reynolds' resignation on the radio. Michael calls her, and they conclude it is best to disappear as he had originally planned.

FBI Agent Lang (Barbara Eve Harris) is tailing Sara, and informs Agent Alexander Mahone (William Fichtner) of their location. Mahone replies that he will be right there.

Sara realizes that she is being tailed by the authorities. Unwilling to lead them to Michael and Lincoln, Sara tells Michael by telephone that she is already aboard the ship and that she loves him. She then stops her car, and approaches Agent Lang with her hands up. She is arrested and read her Miranda Rights, as Mahone expresses frustration that she did not lead them to the brothers.

Michael sees police cars with their lights flashing and their alarms blaring. Shocked, Michael wants to pursue her, but Lincoln successfully convinces him that there is nothing he can do to save her.

One week passes. Agent Mahone is in an office covered with pictures related to the manhunt. He stares at a calendar littered with memos detailing a timeline of events concerning the Fox River Eight. A concerned Agent Lang enters the room and asks to be apprised of Mahone's progress. Mahone shows Lang copies of sketches recovered from Scofield's hard drive.

The sketches are those of Michael's tattoos, which included notations from the Greek Alphabet. The original sketches of the tattoos contained these notations, however they were not included on the actual tattoo. "Allen Schweitzer", the first tattoo which was used in "Allen" was "alpha", and an illustration of Jesus Christ in a rose was omega (the last letter of the Greek Alphabet), in addition to the number "617". Mahone believes this sketch is the key to the last step in Michael's game plan.

After reading through Michael's file, Mahone notices that Michael's mother's name is Christina Rose. He concludes that the sketch found on Michael's hard drive is a pictorial charade for "Christina Rose", and orders his men to get him a map of Panama, and any information regarding Michael's mother. He also orders them to do searches for her in Panama, and call the embassy there to make arrests if they have to. When Lang replies that international laws won't permit such an action, Mahone replies that the Patriot Act will allow it.

Mahone later receives a telephone call from Secret Service Agent William Kim. Agent Kim is at a beach, and informs Mahone that C-Note is not dead, but is in fact about to be released. He replies this is impossible and that he is on top of the situation. Kim begs to differ, as Mahone asks his underlings to find Agent Wheeler.

Kim is told by a suited man that "he'll see you now." Kim boards a row boat, and joins the enigmatic "Pad Man". When Kim remarks that it is an unusual place to meet, Pad Man verbally replies that a blind spot in surveillance equipment makes it a proper place to discuss the situation. He further says that there will be a "change of strategy" and mentions "SONA".

Wheeler is in his car in a parking garage, speaking to Agent Sullins on his cell phone. Wheeler is concerned for his safety, as he believes that Mahone will be able to read him and figure out that he is under investigation. When Wheeler asks Sullins about protection, he replies "just act normal". As Wheeler leaves his car, Mahone suddenly appears. He tells Wheeler that the penalty for traitors is beheading.

He further tells Wheeler that he did not do a good job of covering his tracks, as if he wanted it to be known who had betrayed him. Wheeler looks at Mahone with fear and says to his face, "You're a killer, Alex." He mentions Mahone's string of crimes, including the deaths of Oscar Shales, David Apolskis, and John Abruzzi, Mahone replies that Wheeler reminds him of a younger version of himself. He advises Wheeler "Don't let anyone scare you into doing the wrong thing."

Mahone rips the prints pertaining to the manhunt off the walls, and throws them in a trash bag. Kim suddenly appears, and asks "Going somewhere, Alex?" Kim assures Mahone that he can escape his indictment by going to Panama. He said that the change of strategy involved Theodore Bagwell. Kim further says that T-bag was caught in Mexico to which Mahone asks Kim if he wanted T-Bag killed. Kim replied that he is needed alive, due to a change in strategy.

Michael and Lincoln arrive in Cristóbal, Panama. Michael tells Lincoln that there is someone that they need to see. The brothers board a bus, and Lincoln remarks that this is his first bus ride since going to Fox River State Penitentiary. The brothers then go to a small store, where Michael meets an older woman. She remarks that Michael is late, although she recognizes him and gives Michael a small piece of paper with information on where to find Christina Rose. While talking with this woman, Michael refers to Lincoln as a business associate. Michael asks if she has a phone that he can use, and she replies affirmatively. As Michael asks for international assistance to call Sara, Lincoln presses the receiver, and says that making such a call is dangerous.

The brothers argue as Michael despairs the loss of Sara. Michael reminds Lincoln of the deaths of other members of the Fox River Eight, as well as the death of Veronica. Lincoln flies into a rage, and the two briefly grapple. After their scuffle, Lincoln reminds Michael that Sara made a choice while Veronica did not, and he had to listen to Veronica die while there was nothing he could do.

The brothers reach a dock, where a yacht called the "Christina Rose" is moored. Meanwhile, Lang calls Mahone, informing him that a boat of the same name was commissioned in Panama.

Aboard the yacht, Michael opens the padlock by using the combination "617", the number on his final tattoo. He surfs the web on his mobile phone, and notes that Sucre has recently posted on europeangoldfinch.net. He said that T-Bag will be at the Fin Del Camino Hotel in Panama City. Michael argues that it is no longer about Westmoreland's money, but the fact that T-Bag has killed and that there is blood on both their hands. Michael remarks that he must be stopped.

Lincoln ponders as to how T-Bag knew about Panama. In the meantime, Mahone is at an airport, waiting for a flight to Panama, as he adds the finishing touch to a post on europeangoldfinch.net, which he signs "Sucre".

As Lincoln explores the ship for a short time, he emerges from the cabin, looking to find Michael, when he discovers that he is completely alone.

== Production ==
The original airdate of the episode was scheduled two weeks after the 19th episode of the season instead of March 12, 2007 as the principal photography of the episode had yet to be finished. Portions of the episode were filmed at Pensacola Beach in Florida with approximately 120 cast and crew members, and 20 extras. The producers selected this particular location over other areas, which included South Padre Island, Texas and Destin, Florida, because "of the islands" and that it "gives you more to look at than just a long stretch of beach." Pensacola Beach was used to represent the Panama area in the final three episodes of the season (oddly enough, Pensacola is less than a hundred miles from Panama City, Florida). The filming of the 20th episode at Pensacola Beach finished on March 13, 2007.

== Reception ==
After a one-week break, the show returned with an average audience of 8.26 million. It obtained 5.3% household rating and 8% household share, while scoring a 3.5/10 rating for its key demographic (18-49). Although the episode received fewer viewers than the season average of 9.1 million viewers, the show was renewed for a third season by the Fox network three days later on March 22, 2007. At the time the show had the most audience in the 18-49 demographic in its 8:00 p.m. Monday timeslot.
