= Rendezvous (Prison Break) =

- Prison Break episode
- Episode no.: Season 2 Episode 10
- Directed by: Dwight H. Little
- Written by: Karyn Usher
- Production code: 2AKJ10
- Original air date: November 6, 2006

Guest appearances
- Kurt Caceres as Hector Avila; Jason Davis as Agent Wheeler; Matt DeCaro as Roy Geary; Anthony Denison as Aldo Burrows; Barbara Eve Harris as Felicia Lang; Reggie Lee as Bill Kim; Kristin Lehman as Jane Phillips; Rachel Loera as Theresa Delgado; Bill Wise as Hotel guy; Ron Tatar as Hotel manager

Episode chronology
| ← Previous "Unearthed" | Next → "Bolshoi Booze" |
- Prison Break (season 2)

"Rendezvous" is the thirty-second episode of the American television series Prison Break and is the tenth episode of its second season. It was first aired on November 6, 2006, making it the first episode to be aired during the November sweeps in the United States. The episode is written by Karyn Usher and directed by Dwight H. Little. Regarding the casting of this episode, Rockmond Dunbar (who plays Benjamin Miles "C-Note" Franklin), does not appear in this episode. "Rendezvous" features the meeting of the characters, Michael Scofield and Sara Tancredi, for the first time in the second season. The episode takes place on June 3 as revealed in the previous episode.

== Plot ==
The episode opens in Tribune, Kansas as Brad Bellick (Wade Williams) and Roy Geary (Matt DeCaro) continue to torture T-Bag (Robert Knepper) for the location of the five million dollars. While they torture T-Bag, they play the song, "Walking on Sunshine" continuously. After a fight, T-Bag swallows the locker key he had hidden in his sock which prompts Bellick and Geary to strap him to a toilet, where they force him to excrete the key. After retrieving the key, Bellick leaves T-Bag tethered to a radiator and calls 911 to tell them there is an intruder in the house, then he and Geary head to the train station and obtain the backpack from the locker. Bellick opens the bag to show the pile of money inside. Geary then threatens Bellick and hits him on the head twice with a meat tenderizer that they originally used to torture T-Bag in the house before leaving the station with the bag and an unconscious Bellick on the ground.

Sucre (Amaury Nolasco) is forced to continue on foot after his car broke down in Dinosaur, Nebraska. Once he gets to a gas station, he calls Theresa, Maricruz's sister. Theresa tells him that she and Maricruz are leaving on a trip to Ixtapa, Mexico but Sucre insists that Maricruz has to call him back on this payphone.

However, when the payphone rings, Sucre is unable to answer it due to the presence of the police. He later leaves a message on Theresa's answering machine telling her he will be waiting for Maricruz at an airport in Mexico when her vacation is finished. He also says the couple can go to his aunt's farm outside of Mexico City, and that there is a llama for the baby to ride on. Hector later enters Theresa's home in a jealous rage, asking for Maricruz.

After arriving in Gila, New Mexico, Agent Mahone (William Fichtner) calls Agent Kellerman, who is on his way to Willcox, Arizona, to tell him that he is closing on Michael Scofield (Wentworth Miller) and Sara Tancredi (Sarah Wayne Callies). Mahone visits several hotels in Gila and finally finds the one Sara stayed at under the alias, Kelli Foster. He retrieves the fax Michael had sent to Sara twenty minutes earlier and immediately heads to the location stated in the fax.

As Mahone searched through the hotels in Gila, Michael and Sara had their rendezvous. Sara asks about Michael's plan and is disappointed when he tells her about Panama. Michael tells her that he has many regrets and that his biggest regret was what he had done to her. Their conversation is interrupted by the arrival of Mahone. They get into Michael's car and are chased by Mahone. Ultimately, they crash into an abandoned factory, where Mahone continues to pursue them. Michael distracts Mahone in order to help Sara escape the factory. He later opens a propane valve and traps Mahone in a cage, where Mahone tells Michael that the difference between them is that he is willing to kill and Michael is not. He also reveals to Michael that he knows about Panama. In the meantime, Sara disables Mahone's car and retrieves her car to pick up Michael.

They proceed to a motel after making some purchases. As Sara cleans and wraps his wound, (which he sustained from accidentally knocking into the sharp end of the propane gas valve while hiding from Mahone) Michael asks her to stay with him for one more day; his meeting with the coyote is tomorrow. However, after she tells him to clean up, Sara leaves. Just as Michael finds her note, Sara changes her mind but is confronted by Kellerman, who had been told by Agent Kim (Reggie Lee) to interrogate her.

At the Chicago headquarters of the F.B.I., the federal agents celebrate after the arrests of Lincoln Burrows (Dominic Purcell) and his son in Willcox, Arizona were confirmed. However, the patrol car occupied by Lincoln and L. J. (Marshall Allman) is run off the road by a black van. Lincoln and L. J. escape from the crash but are stopped by a group of people who tell them that they were associates of Lincoln's father. They are taken to a secured house in Trinidad, Colorado, where Lincoln is questioned about the whereabouts of his brother. Suspicious of these people, Lincoln and L. J. attempt to escape just as his father arrives.

After Lincoln introduces his father, Aldo Burrows (Anthony Denison) to L. J., his father tells him to stop running and that they can exonerate him soon with the evidence he has gathered. However, Lincoln insists on meeting with Michael. Meanwhile, an agent who is watching over their discussion receives a call from Agent Kim. Kim tells him to kill the three Burrows at once.

== Reception ==
In terms of viewership, the Country Music Association Awards on ABC was in first place in the 8:00pm timeslot but Fox's Prison Break obtained the largest amount of audience in the 18-34 demographics. The viewer ratings for this episode placed Fox in fourth place in the timeslot with an average of 8.6 million viewers and a 3.5% household rating and 9% household share.

This episode attained varied responses from the critics. The San Diego Union-Tribune gave a positive criticism for the episode, giving it an A grade and the author commented that "the pacing is back, and I’m back on the edge of my seat". Similarly, the Victoria Times-Colonist called it a "briskly paced hour of entertainment television". On the other hand, the critic from the Arizona Daily Star stated that the episode "underwhelmed" him and that "all it did was create more cliffhangers". The TV Fodder made similar comments on the episode, stating that the episode was filled with small stories that "needed to be told in order to move on to some bigger plot points". The author concluded his review with "I was mostly bored during this episode".
