= The Message (Prison Break) =

- Prison Break episode
- Episode no.: Season 2 Episode 15
- Directed by: Bobby Roth
- Written by: Zack Estrin; Karyn Usher
- Production code: 2AKJ15
- Original air date: January 29, 2007

Guest appearances
- Steve Barnes as Agent Drucker; DuShon Monique Brown as Katie Welsh; Ismael Carlo as Old Mexican Man; Kaley Cuoco as Sasha; Jason Davis as Agent Wheeler; Steve Eagar as Fox News anchor; Anthony Fleming as Trumpets; Barbara Eve Harris as Felicia Lang; Reggie Lee as Bill Kim; Leo Marks as Greg Rydenour; Silas Weir Mitchell as Charles "Haywire" Patoshik; Daniel Ross as Matt; Leon Russom as Pad Man; Paul Mitchell Wright as Sasha's father

Episode chronology
← Previous "John Doe"	Next → "Chicago"
- Prison Break (season 2)

"The Message" is the thirty-seventh episode of the American television series Prison Break and is the fifteenth episode of its second season. Originally aired on January 29, 2007, the episode was written by Zack Estrin and Karyn Usher, and was directed by Bobby Roth. Regular cast members Robert Knepper (who plays T-Bag) and Rockmond Dunbar (who plays C-Note) do not appear in this episode. The episode mainly features the protagonists, Michael Scofield and Lincoln Burrows, trying to reach Sara Tancredi, who may help to prove Lincoln's innocence.

== Summary ==
The episode opens with a Fox News Channel broadcast of Lincoln Burrows (Dominic Purcell), proclaiming his innocence.

Six hours prior to this newscast, Lincoln is in the Cutback Motel room 11 in Montana, with his brother Michael Scofield (Wentworth Miller) and ex-agent Paul Kellerman (Paul Adelstein). The policeman outside is beckoning Michael to leave the motel room and surrender. Kellerman cracks the door open, flashes his badge, and announces that he is with the FBI and will take the brothers to Billings. As Kellerman herds the brothers who seemingly have their hands bound behind their backs, the police officer demands to see Kellerman's identification. With that, the trio explodes into action, seizing a cameraman from the newscrew, commandeering a car, and driving away.

Agent Alexander Mahone (William Fichtner) returns to the FBI Field Office in Chicago, Illinois. Mahone asks for updates; in reply, Agents Lang (Barbara Eve Harris) and Wheeler (Jason Davis) inform him that Brad Bellick (Wade Williams) has been apprehended for the death of another CO, Roy Geary, and that C-Note's wife Kacee has been apprehended in North Dakota. Mahone scoffs in response, demanding updates concerning the Fox River Eight.

Michael, Lincoln, and Kellerman are in a car, with their cameraman hostage still in tow. Michael asks Kellerman to stop at an abandoned warehouse and he complies. The trio discusses what to do, while the cameraman stares anxiously.

At Fox River State Penitentiary, a battered and bloodied Brad Bellick wakes up in the infirmary. Trumpets (Anthony Fleming) is there, acting as an orderly. He informs Bellick that although the inmates won't kill him, they'll continue to hurt him badly. After telling Trumpets to leave, Nurse Katie Welch (DuShon Monique Brown) tells Bellick that he will be returning to the General Population tonight. Bellick is reluctant to leave the infirmary. Bellick's behavior, particularly around Nurse Katie, at the start of this episode intentionally mirrors that of Michael's when he was in the infirmary at Fox River. He stares longingly at the now-severed cable that the Fox River Eight used to escape, and asks Katie to "leave the door open when she goes home", a reference to Michael's request of Sara to leave the infirmary door open so that he and Lincoln could escape.

In the state of Sinaloa, Mexico, Fernando Sucre (Amaury Nolasco) sits in an old bus, heading for Ixtapa. Sucre befriends an elderly passenger (Ismael 'East' Carlo), who notices his Puerto Rican accent. When they arrive in Calomatillo, Sucre unsuccessfully tries to stay aboard the bus as he did not have a paying ticket. Sucre's newfound friend, the elderly passenger, invites Sucre to his home, providing that he can cook. Sucre agrees to this proposal, as he sees the elderly man's vehicle, a Volkswagen Beetle, as a way of getting to Ixtapa to see Maricruz. After they finish dinner and the elderly host had retired for the night, Sucre stole the car but is later stopped by the Mexican police. The widower tells the police that he is glad they found Sucre, as he forgot to give him gas money. The police let him go, as the widower tells Sucre to "find your girl, then find grace" (contrary to the subtitles, however, the elderly man actually said "find the grace of God").

In Algoma, Wisconsin, Haywire (Silas Weir Mitchell) is with his dog, a Border Collie he named Larry, while he digs in a dumpster. A teen couple approaches Haywire and asks him to buy them some beer. Haywire agrees, but wants to buy dog food as well. The guy offers Haywire some money to buy his own beer, but Haywire refuses, and replies "My dad used to drink". Haywire delivers the beer to the teens, and shows the girl, Sasha (Kaley Cuoco), the raft that he is trying to build. He tells her enthusiastically that he is trying to get to Holland with the raft. Sasha's friend Matt replies, "Good luck, Gilligan." When Haywire notices bruises on Sasha's wrists, Sasha can only answer "my dad drinks too". Haywire follows Sasha to her home, where her father is about to beat her with a fireplace implement. The Fox River escapee attacks Sasha's father repeatedly upon entering.

A Montana television station is stunned to see their missing cameraman back safely, holding a video cassette.

In the Chicago FBI Field Office, Mahone demands that the roads in Montana be closed. As he makes demands, the office's attention is drawn to the television. Fox News is airing a video featuring Michael and Lincoln, where Lincoln declares his innocence. He further blames the murders on The Company, and explains their nature. Michael announces that Sara Tancredi (Sarah Wayne Callies) is innocent as well, and that FBI Agent Mahone has murdered Abruzzi, Tweener and also the missing Oscar Shales. As eyes around the office focus on Mahone, he announces that Michael is crazy.

As this video airs, Agent William Kim (Reggie Lee) is watching as well. Turning to his subordinate, he demands "Damage control immediately!" When the subordinate reminds him that it is already on the air, Kim yells in reply, "Start a wildfire in Florida! Find a lost storage unit full of Arabs! I do not care! As long as it's not about Lincoln Burrows!" He later meets with the mysterious man who communicates with a notepad, and they agree that while the President is in danger, she has some expendability.

Mahone is informed by a Montana FBI agent who interrogated the cameraman that the brothers mentioned driving to a location 450 miles away within six hours. Mahone comes to the conclusion that the brothers are headed toward Denver, Colorado, where President Caroline Reynolds (Patricia Wettig) will speak. Agent Wheeler interrupts Mahone's requests for information. When Mahone asks if Wheeler has a problem with the way he does things, Wheeler replies affirmatively and adds that "I'm not the only one." He further informs Mahone that FBI Internal Affairs wants to be kept posted of Mahone's moves.

Agent Mahone watches the Declaration of Innocence video with analysts who believe that Burrows is lying, based on subtle movements he makes. These subtle movements were actually orchestrated by Kellerman, who told the brothers that such movements would confuse the analyzers. "Tell them you're the Green Lantern", Kellerman flippantly told the brothers, "but I know how they break down these tapes."

The FBI analysts are transfixed on a Morse code message that Michael taps out with his hand ("the water is warm"), but Mahone knows that Michael is trying to throw them off the scent. It's when he and the analysts pay attention to Michael's apology to Sara that Mahone figures out that the message isn't a Declaration of Innocence at all, and the brothers aren't going after President Reynolds: they're going after Sara. He immediately demands that Sara's records, contacts and habits be analysed for clues.

At the same time, Sara Tancredi watches the video of Michael and Lincoln from the Jewell Glore Library in Kansas City, Missouri, flipping through a book as she does.

At Fox River, Mahone questions Nurse Katie, only to find no useful information. He attempts to question Bellick, who demands to be placed in Ad Seg. Mahone replies that he has no pull with the Department of Corrections, but the badly battered Bellick is adamant in his demand. Mahone agrees, and Bellick informs the Agent that the quotes used by Michael are chapter titles in the Alcoholics Anonymous book. By analysing the chapters in the book, Mahone quickly discovers that Michael is planning to rendezvous with Sara at the St. Thomas Hospital in Akron, Ohio.

As Michael, Lincoln, and Kellerman drive, they hear on the radio how their news story is being sidelined due to a lost storage unit full of Arabs (which raises the Homeland Security Advisory System into Orange Alert). They then stand close to the hospital lobby, while Michael hears a page asking for "Michael Crane". This is an allusion to the origami cranes he made for her. Michael answers the call, and speaks with Sara for the first time since their meeting in Gila, New Mexico. Sara tells Michael that she couldn't get to his location in time, but Michael promises her that they can end this soon. While Michael talks to Sara, Kellerman receives a telephone call from the President, telling him that he is the only one that cares about her, and that he should return to her side, but without the brothers.

Michael returns, and the trio return to their car. "In a few days, this should all be over," Michael said. "Absolutely." replied Kellerman. The episode ends with Kellerman's loyalties unclear.

== Production details ==
The scene which featured St. Thomas hospital in Akron, Ohio was actually filmed in a local Dallas hospital. Producers of the show explained that since the second season was mainly filmed in the Dallas area, the filming could not occur in Akron.

== Reception ==
Mediaweek again reports that Prison Break was second place for the Monday 8:00pm timeslot behind NBC's Deal or No Deal. The episode achieved a 6.3% household rating and 9% household share with an average of 9.9 million viewers and was closer behind Deal or No Deal's in terms of the ratings recorded for the 18-49 demographic.

Critical reviews for this episode mainly concerned the season's plot. Troy Rogers of UGO gave "The Message" a B+, stating, "This week, Prison Break went the distance in connecting as many dots as possible, while catching us up to speed on a few long lost players, including Haywire, Sara, and Sucre." Similarly, John Keegan of MediaBlvd muses that, "There's plenty of time left in the season to bring those to conclusion, but it's also possible that they will remain open-ended. Only time will reveal these intentions." A critic from Tv Fodder remarks that, "Peeking ahead to the preview for next week, it should be more action packed than anything we've seen in a while. Which will be a nice change of pace."

Entertainment Weekly's Kate Sullivan had this to say of "The Message": "Icy, but hilarious, was the infirmary nurse who turned down Bellick's try at Michael-esque charm when he asked her to leave the door open for him."

Overall, San Diego Union-Tribune's TV Tracker's Craig Blanchard gave "The Message" an A+ grade, stating that, "All in all, this was a great episode. One place in particular that I rather enjoy seeing is all of Mahone's fellow agents starting to second guess his decisions."
