= Bolshoi Booze =

- Prison Break episode
- Episode no.: Season 2 Episode 11
- Directed by: Greg Yaitanes
- Written by: Monica Macer &; Seth Hoffman
- Production code: 2AKJ11
- Original air date: November 13, 2006

Guest appearances
- Jason Davis as Mark Wheeler; Matt DeCaro as Roy Geary; Anthony Denison as Aldo Burrows; Reggie Lee as Bill Kim; Kristin Lehman as Jane Phillips; Romy Rosemont as Kathryn Slattery; Callie Thorne as Pam Mahone; John Heard as Frank Tancredi; José Zúñiga as Coyote; Luis Olmeda as Carlos; Rey Hernandez as Ernesto; Matthew Tompkins as Leon

Episode chronology
← Previous "Rendezvous"	Next → "Disconnect"
- Prison Break (season 2)

"Bolshoi Booze" is the thirty-third episode of the American television series Prison Break and is the eleventh episode of its second season. Aired on November 13, 2006, it was the second of the four episodes to be aired during the November sweeps in the United States. The episode was written by Monica Macer and Seth Hoffman, and directed by Greg Yaitanes, who directed "Brother's Keeper".

Rockmond Dunbar (who plays Benjamin Miles "C-Note" Franklin) was the only regular cast member who did not appear in this episode. The episode title refers to the coded location of the rendezvous between the protagonist Michael Scofield and a people-smuggler. The events in this episode take place on June 4 as indicated by Michael in "Buried".

== Plot ==
T-Bag (Robert Knepper) escapes Susan Hollander's house in Tribune, Kansas by severing his reattached hand, narrowly escaping apprehension by the Tribune police. He then proceeds to use his GPS device to track the location of Charles Westmoreland's money and finds it in Geary's possession. Geary (Matt DeCaro) is at an expensive hotel suite when three call girls arrive. When his indecent proposal costs him seven hundred fifty dollars, Geary reaches into the bag of money and notices the GPS tracking device. Before he can react, a more than usually disheveled T-Bag arrives and tells the call girls to leave. He threatens a frightened Geary with a champagne bottle as Geary suggests splitting the money, saying "Come on T, we can deal". T-Bag appears to disagree. The second-to-next scene shows T-Bag drinking champagne and going through the backpack, where he finds cigarettes and what appears to be a receipt, while studying this he gets a cunning look. The song playing in this scene is "The Only Hell My Mama Ever Raised" by Johnny Paycheck.

In the meantime, Brad Bellick (Wade Williams) is at a Tribune hospital talking to Detective Slattery (Romy Rosemont), telling her that a black male in his early twenties attacked him at the bus station. Slattery finds holes in Bellick's story; when she leaves the room, Bellick threatens Roy Geary on his voice mail. As Bellick leaves the hospital, he sees Geary dead on a gurney, admits that they were friends, and Slattery tells Bellick she needs to ask him more questions.

In Maljamar, New Mexico, Michael (Wentworth Miller) buys some supplies, but steals a GPS device. The elderly shopkeeper tries to stop Michael but is overpowered by him, and Michael escapes with the GPS. This is a catalyst for Michael, who realises what he is becoming. A montage of all the wrongs committed for the sake of the escape appears strongly in his memory, prompting him to go to a confessional to confess his sins. He vaguely describes his sins to the priest, and also explains that as a child, he saw a man bleed to death and was glad for it.

Michael then hitchhikes to Country Road 17 and uses his GPS to find the location of Bolshoi Booze. While waiting at the location, the Coyote (people smuggler) arrives with two associates in a blue Ford pickup. In exchange for the escape plane, Michael was to give a box of medical nitroglycerin as promised. However, when the "nitro" is tested, it is discovered to be sugar water. The real nitroglycerin Michael had prepared to bring was already confiscated by the F.B.I. in episode "Unearthed".

The head Coyote (Jose Zuniga) and his two men threaten to kill Michael but Fernando Sucre (Amaury Nolasco) suddenly appears and rescues Michael, shooting the ringleader in the shoulder. They tie up Michael's would be killers. Aware of the fact that the ringleader may die from his wound without medical attention, Michael, with his confession fresh on his mind, lets the men go, and discovers the true location of the plane - "The seven mile marker at Route 4". The ringleader further says that "It's going to stop for five minutes. Then it's going to go to Oaxaca, Mexico."

In the safe house at Trinidad, Colorado, Aldo Burrows (Anthony Denison) explains to his son Lincoln Burrows (Dominic Purcell) and his grandson L. J. Burrows (Marshall Allman) about the nature of the conspiracy. He explains how President Caroline Reynolds is serving The Company. He also says that an NSA analyst acquired a conversation between Reynolds and Terrence Steadman two weeks after Steadman's purported death. Although the analyst was apprehended, a digital copy of the conversation was sent to Sara Tancredi's father, Governor Frank Tancredi (John Heard). Aldo says of Sara (Sarah Wayne Callies), "She's the key to this whole thing, Lincoln."

Agent Kim's operative kills two of Aldo's men, and attempts to kill Lincoln as well. Lincoln rushes and stabs the operative, and Jane (Kristin Lehman) shoots the latter dead. The operative's mobile phone rings, and despite Aldo's warning, Lincoln answers the call. He threatens Agent Kim (Reggie Lee), who replies, "You don't even know who I am."

Lincoln and LJ part ways; LJ goes with Jane to safety, while Aldo and Lincoln head to Bolshoi Booze to meet Michael. Michael, Sucre, and Lincoln meet. When Michael sees Aldo, he recognizes him.

Agent Paul Kellerman (Paul Adelstein) gags Sara and ties her hands behind her back in a Gila, New Mexico motel room. Kellerman explains to Sara that he is not Lance, he is not an addict, and proceeds to interrogate her regarding the item her father took from Washington, DC. When Sara repeatedly denies knowledge of it, Kellerman tortures her by dunking her in a filled bathtub. When he still cannot get the information, Kellerman dons rubber gloves, dumps a working iron into the bathtub and dunking Sara again to add an electrocution effect to the torture routine. Agent Kim later calls Kellerman and orders him to kill Sara. After considering the matter and Sara's refusal to give in, Kellerman dunks her into the water and holds her down.

Agent Alexander Mahone (William Fichtner) is still in the factory near Gila when Agent Kim arrives to open the gate. He explains to Mahone that once Burrows crosses the border, he is of no use to The Company. Mahone roughs up Kim when he appears to threaten his son, Cameron.

Losing a desperate battle to discover the meaning of Bolshoi Booze, Mahone tries to call his wife Pam (Callie Thorne), but she does not pick up the phone. Upon re-examining the photograph of the tattoo, Mahone realizes that Bolshoi Booze upside down are geographical coordinates, located at 32°00′9″N 104°57′09″W. Agent Wheeler tells Mahone the exact location of the coordinates, and Mahone hangs up on him. Wheeler tells the other agents, "He's keeping us out of the loop."

Pam calls Mahone back. Mahone tells Pam that he would do things differently if he had a chance to change the way events transpired between them. Pam offers to pick him up, but Mahone tells Pam he loves her and hangs up.

== Production ==
The character, Aldo Burrows, reveals in the episode that the incriminating conversation between (now President) Reynolds and her brother happened a few months after the 9/11 terrorist attacks. Since the events of the show begin three years after Steadman's "death", this would place the show in the year of 2005. This was later confirmed in the episode, "Wash".

== Reception ==
This episode improved in viewer ratings and critical responses from earlier episodes. The episode attained 9.15 million viewers with 5.8% household rating and 9% household share for the Fox network on November 13, 2006, placing the network in third place behind CBS and NBC for the night. Although one reviewer from the Arizona Daily Star commented that the writers of the show had "squandered what could have been one of the most dramatic arcs of the series", the critic from IGN commended the episode for the "clever plot twists and a few character defining moments". Furthermore, the critic added, "'Bolshoi Booze' provides fans with a breathless foray of excitement and ingenuity." The episode received an overall rating of 9.5/10 from IGN. From TV Fodder, the reviewer gave a positive criticism for the episode and stated that it was among the top three episodes of the second season, along with the "Manhunt" and "Scan" episodes. There were further praises for the episode's "emotional struggles, double and triple crosses, last minute rescues" and "cliff-hanger of the type we all expect from this show". Similarly, a critic from The San Diego Union-Tribune gave the episode a grade A. He also commented on the number of deaths on Prison Break and cannot see a "realistic way of [Sara] getting out of that situation" but commends the show for having the courage to suggest the death of a major character.
