= Prison Break season 2 =

Season of television series

Prison Break
- Season 2
- DVD cover
- No. of episodes: 22

Release
- Original network: Fox
- Original release: August 21, 2006 – April 2, 2007

Season chronology
- ← Previous; Season 1 Next → Season 3

The second season of Prison Break, an American serial drama television series, commenced airing in the United States on August 21, 2006, on Mondays at 8:00 pm (EST) on Fox. Prison Break is produced by Adelstein-Parouse Productions, in association with Rat Entertainment, Original Film and 20th Century Fox Television. The season contains 22 episodes, and concluded on April 2, 2007. Series creator Paul Scheuring describes the second season as "The Fugitive times eight," and likens it to the "second half of The Great Escape."

Prison Break revolves around two brothers: one who has been sentenced to death for a crime he did not commit and his younger sibling, a genius who devises an elaborate plan to help him escape prison. The brothers, along with six other prisoners at Fox River State Penitentiary, manage to escape, and the second season follows a massive manhunt chasing the group. Dubbed the Fox River Eight, the group splits, and members go their way, occasionally meeting up to help each other. They struggle to escape from the police while avoiding a secret group of multinationals called The Company, that wants them all dead.

For the season, three characters are downgraded from series regular to recurring status, and a new character is introduced. Filming took place in Dallas, Texas, due to a close proximity of rural and urban settings. For the final three episodes, scenes were filmed in Pensacola, Florida, to represent Panama. Critical reviews of the season were generally positive, with the addition of William Fichtner to the cast receiving much praise. Fox Home Entertainment released the season in Region 1 on September 4, 2007.

== Cast ==
=== Main characters ===
- Dominic Purcell as Lincoln Burrows
- Wentworth Miller as Michael Scofield
- Robin Tunney as Veronica Donovan
- Amaury Nolasco as Fernando Sucre
- Marshall Allman as L.J. Burrows
- Wade Williams as Captain Brad Bellick
- Paul Adelstein as Secret Service Agent Paul Kellerman
- Robert Knepper as Theodore "T-Bag" Bagwell
- Rockmond Dunbar as Benjamin Miles "C-Note" Franklin
- Sarah Wayne Callies as Dr. Sara Tancredi
- William Fichtner as FBI Special Agent Alexander Mahone

=== Recurring characters ===
- Jason Davis as FBI Agent Wheeler
- Reggie Lee as Agent Bill Kim
- Barbara Eve Harris as FBI Agent Felicia Lang
- Matt DeCaro as Roy Geary
- Helena Klevorn as Dede Franklin
- Wilbur Fitzgerald as Bruce Bennett
- Lane Garrison as David "Tweener" Apolskis
- John Heard as Governor Frank Tancredi
- Cynthia Kaye McWilliams as Kacee Franklin
- Leon Russom as General
- Callie Thorne as Pam Mahone
- K. K. Dodds as Susan Hollander
- Silas Weir Mitchell as Charles "Haywire" Patoshik
- Anthony Denison as Aldo Burrows
- Camille Guaty as Maricruz Delgado
- Stacy Keach as Warden Henry Pope
- Jeff Perry as Terrence Steadman
- Steven Chester Prince as Agent Blondie
- Peter Stormare as John Abruzzi
- Patricia Wettig as President Caroline Reynolds
- DuShon Monique Brown as Nurse Katie Welsh
- Kim Coates as Internal Affairs Agent Richard Sullins
- Joe Nunez as Manche Sanchez
- Holly Valance as Nika Volek
- Phillip Edward Van Lear as C.O. Louis Patterson
- Anthony Fleming as Trumpets
- Christian Stolte as C.O. Keith Stolte
- Ranjit Chowdhry as Dr. Marvin Gudat
- John S. Davies as Elliot Pike

== Episodes ==
| No. overall | No. in season | Title | Directed by | Written by | Original release date | Prod. code | U.S. viewers (millions) |
|---|---|---|---|---|---|---|---|
| 23 | 1 | "Manhunt" | Kevin Hooks | Paul Scheuring | August 21, 2006 | 2AKJ01 | 9.37 |
FBI agent Alexander Mahone is tasked with capturing the "Fox River Eight" while the C.Os keep chasing them. The team (Scofield, Burrows, Sucre, Abruzzi and Franklin) steals a truck and Scofield says that they need to go to a warehouse in Oswego. The C.Os track them there, but to the wrong warehouse. Meanwhile, Mahone checks Scofield's apartment and realizes that the latter had been planning for months and orders the nearby river be searched. Mahone also finds the secret behind Scofield's tattoo. Bagwell forces a doctor to rejoin his hand. Donovan realizes that she can't leave the mansion. She calls the police; but suited men arrive instead and kill her. Tancredi regains consciousness and sees a message from Scofield about a plan. The team recovers shovels from the warehouse and start digging a grave, where Scofield had planted clothes and stuff needed for disappearing. Mahone, who's revealed to be addicted to a specific drug, arrives shortly after and attracts the attention of Scofield. Mahone vows to completely understand Scofield's plan and capture him.
| 24 | 2 | "Otis" | Bobby Roth | Matt Olmstead | August 28, 2006 | 2AKJ02 | 9.44 |
By previously fired C.O. Geary's testimony, the authorities suspend Pope because of giving special privileges to Scofield and fire Bellick for selling the P.I. rights to Abruzzi, who is one of the escapees. Bellick realizes that the government has put a bounty on the capture of each of the Fox River Eight. The team separates and Lincoln convinces Scofield to save L.J. They ride on a car Scofield had inserted in a garage. They stop to buy necessary material before being spotted by the police and are forced to leave the car behind. Lincoln calls L.J. and instructs him what to do; but the plan is stopped by Mahone and the brothers escape with Lincoln being shot. L.J. is transferred to be incarcerated in Arizona. Meanwhile, Bagwell has his hand rejoined before killing the doctor and taking his car, intending to go to Utah, where Westmoreland's money is hidden. Apolskis continues pickpocketing and accepts a girl's request to accompany her to Utah.
| 25 | 3 | "Scan" | Bryan Spicer | Zack Estrin | September 4, 2006 | 2AKJ03 | 9.29 |
Bellick faces Geary and fights with him, but they decide to work together to get the bounties. They force failed escapee Sanchez to talk. The brothers arrive in Volek's house, where Lincoln is treated. Scofield returns and gets his car back before getting caught; but when he searches the car, he realizes that the bag is gone. The brothers explode the car with two pieces of flesh in a road designated on the tattoo, making the authorities believe that they are dead; but Mahone becomes suspicious. They join Volek, who has been followed by Bellick and Geary. Meanwhile, Sucre learns from his friend that Delgado is going to marry Hector in Las Vegas. The former takes his friend's bike and starts riding towards Vegas. Franklin manages to convince his wife, Kacee, to understand him, as she didn't know he was in prison and why. Tancredi is arrested and joins rehabilitation on her father's advice, where Kellerman introduces himself as an addict with another name.
| 26 | 4 | "First Down" | Bobby Roth | Nick Santora | September 11, 2006 | 2AKJ04 | 8.96 |
Scofield, Volek and Lincoln are attacked and captured by Bellick and Geary, who want Westmoreland's money instead of the bounty. The duo have a tire puncture caused by Lincoln and Geary takes the tire back to town while Bellick locks the trio. Volek takes Bellick's knife while giving him a lap dance and frees the brothers, who imprison Bellick and later Geary. Bellick reveals Tancredi's condition, causing Volek to try to deliver the brothers for the bounty instead of Westmoreland's money; but she fails and is forsaken in the road. Meanwhile, Apolskis gets involved with the girl without telling her who he is. Abruzzi is informed of Fibonacci's whereabouts; and the former goes to kill the latter; but it is revealed to be a ruse by Mahone to capture him. He refuses to surrender and is fatally shot after pulling his gun. Mahone is blamed for the way he handled the situation. Kellerman and Tancredi get closer. The FBI discovers that the brothers are still alive.
| 27 | 5 | "Map 1213" | Peter O'Fallon | Karyn Usher | September 18, 2006 | 2AKJ05 | 9.55 |
Apolskis's girlfriend is informed who he is and allows him to steal her car and leave. The brothers arrive in Tooele; but no one knows about the farm. They go to the city hall to find the blueprint but realize that someone else has already taken that page. They find Bagwell, who states that he was late too and Apolskis has it. Apolskis is getting digging tools in a store, where the salesman spots him; but the brothers arrive and confront the salesman. Apolskis reveals that Bagwell is keeping the blueprint. Bagwell memorizes and eats it so that the brothers will need him. Sucre goes to the wedding church to meet Delgado; but Hector shows up and Sucre punches him before running. He proceeds to the money while Franklin is doing the same. Mahone finds out about the money and that everyone is converging to Utah. Kellerman is told by Kim, a Company operative, that he can't meet President Reynolds directly and he will report to Kim. Governor Tancredi begins to believe Lincoln's innocence. Scofield, Lincoln and Bagwell find out that a village is now built on the farm where the money is supposed to be.
| 28 | 6 | "Subdivision" | Eric Laneuville | Monica Macer | September 25, 2006 | 2AKJ06 | 8.41 |
Scofield finds out that the money is under the foundation of a house, where a middle-aged woman lives. Apolskis arrives with the stuff and they pose as electricity company contractors who wish to repair the house power supply, which is cut by them deliberately. The woman agrees and they start digging. Sucre meets Franklin on the road and gives him a ride. They join the others in digging. Apolskis is sent to fuel the car. He is spotted in the station and starts running before being captured by Mahone, who demands him the others' whereabouts. Meanwhile, Patoshik is roaming the streets without purpose. He gets in a house and is attracted by a painting of a countryside house and steals it. Governor Tancredi meets Kellerman, who introduced himself as Sara's friend. Bagwell gets the displeasure of the woman, who demands the escapees to leave. They notice a policewoman stopping by the house.
| 29 | 7 | "Buried" | Sergio Mimica-Gezzan | Seth Hoffman | October 2, 2006 | 2AKJ07 | 8.99 |
The policewoman is revealed to be the middle-aged woman's daughter. They lock both of them down and continue digging. Lincoln leaves the team when he hears that L.J. is exonerated and will be released, a trap made by Kellerman, to capture Lincoln. The team eventually finds the money. Sucre pulls a gun on them. Meanwhile, Mahone apparently succeeds in making a deal with Apolskis for taking the agents to the house; but the latter goes to his girlfriend's instead and tells her to wait for him before being taken away. Mahone decides to transfer Apolskis alone, stops the car on the road and kills Apolskis in cold blood. Meanwhile, Patoshik starts building a boat. Sara arrives in her father's house and finds him dead, seeming to be suicide. She gets a key which was in his possession. Kellerman blames Kim for how he handled the governor and reveals that the same thing is planned for Sara.
| 30 | 8 | "Dead Fall" | Vincent Misiano | Zack Estrin | October 23, 2006 | 2AKJ08 | 8.53 |
Sucre takes the whole bag without sharing the money. This is revealed to be Scofield's plan in order to have more share; but they realize that they have the wrong bag. Bagwell is revealed to have the money, intending to find Susan Hollander, the woman who informed the police and had him arrested. While running, Sucre gets stuck in a river; but Scofield manages to save him. Sucre finds out that Delgado canceled her marriage and decides to find her. Using the money they still have, they buy cars and separate. Lincoln finds L.J. and they flee the Company operatives. Bellick and Geary realize that Bagwell has the money and figure out where he is headed. Meanwhile, Tancredi narrowly escapes a Company operative after they mistake someone using a payphone as her. Tancredi calls Bruce Bennett, her father's associate, for help and realizes he sent the operative to kill her and is part of the Company. Kellerman recovers the encrypted messages Tancredi received from Scofield while she is decrypting them. Mahone is revealed to be working for the Company.
| 31 | 9 | "Unearthed" | Kevin Hooks | Nick Santora | October 30, 2006 | 2AKJ09 | 8.94 |
Scofield attempts to obtain the nitroglycerine vials he planted before he got imprisoned; but the FBI is revealed to be waiting for him and he narrowly escapes. He realizes that Mahone is killing everyone he catches and decides to find out more about him by debriefing his former wife, Pam, while posing as an agent. Scofield deduces that Mahone has killed Oscar Shales, a missing serial killer, and buried him in his garden. Scofield tells Mahone to stay away from him and his brother and he won't reveal Mahone's secret in exchange. Mahone refuses now that he's found where Scofield will meet Tancredi. Meanwhile, Franklin meets his friends and they break Kacee out of FBI watch, while he personally saves his daughter and reunites with his family. Bagwell arrives at Hollander's home, to find she has put it up for sale and escaped with her children. Bellick and Geary capture Bagwell and start torturing him to find the money. Kellerman finds out that Tancredi is headed to New Mexico. Lincoln and L.J. evade the police before being captured.
| 32 | 10 | "Rendezvous" | Dwight H. Little | Karyn Usher | November 6, 2006 | 2AKJ10 | 8.63 |
Tancredi arrives in the location and rendezvouses with Scofield before being attacked by Mahone. They lure Mahone into a factory before Tancredi escapes and Scofield locks him in a chamber. Tancredi tends to Scofield's wounds, reminding him that his plan brought Bagwell back to society. Lincoln and L.J. are rescued by Aldo's men while being transferred and taken to the latter's safehouse, where they meet Aldo and a Company mole reports the situation to Kim. Meanwhile, Bellick and Geary find torture useless but see Bagwell swallow a key and obtain it by using laxatives. They find the safety deposit box related to the key and obtain the bag of money before Geary betrays and attacks Bellick and takes it. Sucre gives a message to Delgado to call him; but fails to answer it because of the police being around. He gives her another message to meet him in Mexico, looking at Scofield's note. Tancredi is confronted by Kellerman.
| 33 | 11 | "Bolshoi Booze" | Greg Yaitanes | Monica Macer & Seth Hoffman | November 13, 2006 | 2AKJ11 | 9.21 |
Bagwell decides to recut his hand in order to escape. Since he doesn't have enough money, Scofield steals the material he needs, making him feel guilty. He goes to a church for confession before deciding to continue his plan. Aldo reveals that Governor Tancredi had a tape that can prove Lincoln's innocence. They are attacked by the Company's mole, whom Lincoln kills. Aldo's associate is instructed to take L.J. somewhere safe. Mahone is freed by Kim and finds Scofield's destination. Scofield arrives at his meeting with the people who will pass him from the borders in exchange for nitroglycerine. They find out that Scofield has brought faked nitroglycerine and decide to kill him; but Sucre arrives and saves him, critically shooting their boss. Scofield allows them to leave in exchange for the location of the airstrip. As the two leave, Lincoln and Aldo arrive, with Scofield recognizing his father. Meanwhile, Bellick leaves a message for Geary threatening him. Bagwell finds and kills Geary. Kellerman tortures Tancredi, but to no avail. Kim orders him to kill her; and the former starts suffocating her.
| 34 | 12 | "Disconnect" | Karen Gaviola | Nick Santora & Karyn Usher | November 20, 2006 | 2AKJ12 | 9.62 |
Scofield reveals that he was abused by his foster father before Aldo arrived, killed the man, and saved him. Aldo tells Scofield about the tape and mentions that they no longer need to run. They are attacked by Mahone, who fatally shoots Aldo. Tancredi manages to escape from Kellerman. Kim casts Kellerman out because of his failures and removes all evidence of his existence. After burying Aldo's body, Scofield and Burrows decide to stay and fight instead of fleeing, while Sucre boards the plane alone. Meanwhile, Bellick continues to lie to the police until the message he left for Geary is discovered, resulting in his arrest for murder. Kacee learns that they have left their daughter Dede's medications behind and heads to a drugstore, where she is spotted and arrested. Mahone is late in trying to stop the plane but manages to find Scofield and Burrows, who are attempting to contact Tancredi, and intercepts them.
| 35 | 13 | "The Killing Box" | Bobby Roth | Zack Estrin | November 27, 2006 | 2AKJ13 | 9.62 |
Before Mahone can kill the brothers, the police arrive and arrest them. Mahone requests the police to transfer the brothers alone, which is denied. Kellerman convinces Kim to give him a chance to prove his value by the former's plan to kill the brothers during transfer. Kim instructs Mahone to kill Kellerman after the brothers are dead. Meanwhile, Bellick is convicted and chooses Fox River to be comfortable using his former colleagues; but when he arrives, he finds out that the new warden won't give him special privileges and he is sent to Avocado's cell. Bagwell starts dating a woman who works at a post office, and convinces her to find Hollander's house. The woman finds out who Bagwell is and he kills her. He shocks Hollander and enters her house. Tancredi changes her hairstyle to avoid being spotted. During transfer, the brothers escape as planned before being stopped by Kellerman and Mahone. Kellerman shoots Mahone and offers to help the brothers; and the trio escape the scene.
| 36 | 14 | "John Doe" | Kevin Hooks | Matt Olmstead & Nick Santora | January 22, 2007 | 2AKJ14 | 9.86 |
Burrows recognizes Kellerman and tries to kill him; but he convinces the brothers to trust them by revealing to know Steadman's whereabouts. The trio take a plane to Montana. Mahone tells Kim what happened; and the latter orders the transfer of Steadman; but the trio arrive in time and abduct Steadman. Mahone refuses to work for the Company anymore before his son is attacked he is forced to finish his mission. Meanwhile, Bellick is annoyed by Banks and his fellow inmates. Bellick beats them up using the element of surprise. They plan revenge and at night, the shift guards, who work for Banks, open Bellick's cell for them. Bagwell stops Hollander and her children from leaving. Kellerman reveals that they have removed Steadman's identification documents and had him surged so that no one can recognize the latter now; but Scofield calls the press in order to reveal the truth anyway. Steadman takes a gun and kills himself. The police arrive and surround the motel.
| 37 | 15 | "The Message" | Bobby Roth | Zack Estrin & Karyn Usher | January 29, 2007 | 2AKJ15 | 9.90 |
The trio manage to escape by taking the filmer hostage. Bellick is revealed to have been beaten up and is told to keep his mouth shut. The filmer returns to the network building with his cassette and the network broadcasts it, in which Burrows restates his innocence and the brothers reveal the Company's actions and the truth about Oscar Shales. They are revealed to be transferring some messages, all of which Mahone deduces to be meaningless except one for Tancredi. Mahone asks Bellick to decipher that message and the latter agrees with the condition of being transferred to administrative segregation. Meanwhile, Patoshik befriends a girl and realizes that she is abused by her father and kills the man. Sucre has dinner with an old man and the man allows him to take his car in order to reach Delgado. Tancredi calls the hospital in which the trio are waiting for her while Kellerman is called by a woman sounding to be President Reynolds, who asks him to deliver the brothers.
| 38 | 16 | "Chicago" | Jesse Bochco | Matt Olmstead & Nick Santora | February 5, 2007 | 2AKJ16 | 10.12 |
The trio unite with Tancredi, who tells Scofield what Kellerman did to her; but Kellerman regains his position by revealing that Tancredi's key belongs to a private club in Chicago. They board a train, in which Tancredi tries to kill Kellerman anyway. The police catch four people who jump out of the train, but realize that they are not Scofield's team and the real four leave the station in Chicago. Hollander has a guest and Bagwell decides to move the family outside the city. While Benjamin and Dede are in a diner, it is attacked by a mentally unstable robber. Benjamin tries to solve the situation peacefully; but he finally attacks and locks the robber and the others help him escape the police with Dede. Mahone fails to convince the warden for Bellick's request, but offers Bellick freedom in exchange for doing the former's dirty work, which the latter accepts. He finds Patoshik and chases him to the top of a tower. Mahone arrives and allows Patoshik to kill himself as Kim has ordered the death of all the escapees. Kellerman finds out that the woman on the phone is not Reynolds and gets determined to help the brothers Scofield and Tancredi arrive in the club.
| 39 | 17 | "Bad Blood" | Nelson McCormick | Paul Scheuring & Karyn Usher | February 19, 2007 | 2AKJ17 | 9.55 |
Scofield and Tancredi are spotted and escape the club without recovering the tape. The four find out that Pope is a member and Scofield convinces him to get the tape in exchange for surrendering. After Pope gets the tape, Kim arrives to claim it; but Scofield, Burrows and Tancredi save him and leave Kellerman behind. Pope tells Scofield that the tape is valid and that he doesn't need to surrender. Meanwhile, Bagwell brings Hollander's family to his childhood house, where he was abused by his father. Hollander refuses to stay with Bagwell and he locks them in the basement; but he finally decides to free them and leave. Benjamin takes Dede to a hospital before escaping with her. He takes her to a doctor, but doesn't allow him to inject her anesthetics because of the pain. He finally surrenders and makes a deal with Mahone to deliver Scofield in exchange for Kacee's freedom and Dede's health care. Sucre finds Delgado in Ixtapa and the two escape the police.
| 40 | 18 | "Wash" | Bobby Roth | Nick Santora | February 26, 2007 | 2AKJ18 | 9.42 |
The trio listen to the recording and Lincoln finds a lawyer affiliated with Aldo's group. They arrange a meeting with the lawyer, where a man arrives and Burrows makes sure he is not followed and then leads him to Scofield. Meanwhile, Tancredi is approached by Bennett, who convinces her that he doesn't work for the Company. The two find the real lawyer and try to warn the brothers; but Scofield has already found out and escapes. The lawyer listens to the recording and states that its contents will not exonerate Burrows, but can be used to prosecute Reynolds; and the brothers decide to blackmail Reynolds with it to get pardoned. Meanwhile, Bagwell assumes an identity and takes a plane to Mexico. Sucre and Delgado arrive at his aunt's. Bellick convinces Sanchez to reveal Sucre's whereabouts. Kellerman meets his sister and says goodbye to her, intending to kill the president. Franklin sends several messages to Scofield's website, but receives no reply. Mahone gets a lead on Scofield and instructs Franklin to kill himself.
| 41 | 19 | "Sweet Caroline" | Dwight H. Little | Karyn Usher | March 5, 2007 | 2AKJ19 | 9.72 |
Franklin is saved by the guards and is interrogated by agent Wheeler, who works with internal affairs against Mahone. Reynolds gets a note from Scofield about the tape before the agents abduct him to a room; and Kellerman leaves the scene. Kim starts torturing him until Reynolds arrives and demands to hear the recording. Burrows plays it on the phone, revealing an incestuous relationship between Reynolds and Steadman. Reynolds agrees to pardon the brothers. Meanwhile, Bagwell arrives in Mexico and has a fight with a guard. Sucre sees him on TV and leaves to claim the money; but when he returns, Bellick captures him and he tells him about the money Bagwell has. Mahone finds Tancredi and fails to make her talk. She escapes and this is revealed to be Mahone's plan so that agent Lang can follow her. Before Reynolds moves to her press conference, Kim states that they know her secrets too. Reynolds announces her resignation, ruining Scofield's plan and the brothers decide to disappear.
| 42 | 20 | "Panama" | Vincent Misiano | Zack Estrin | March 19, 2007 | 2AKJ20 | 8.40 |
The brothers get in a ship headed to Panama and await Tancredi, who is arrested by the FBI. Mahone is obsessed with Scofield's plan and finds the last phase to be in Panama. Meanwhile, internal affairs agent Sullins makes a deal with Franklin to expose Mahone. Franklin is given witness protection with his family. Kim reports the situation to an old man. Kim offers to help Mahone disappear if he finishes his mission, with Bagwell being the exception. Mahone travels to Panama. Bagwell kills a prostitute who insults Hollander and narrowly escapes from Sucre and Bellick. Sucre tries to get rid of Bellick; but the latter reveals that Delgado is locked and won't be freed until he finds the money. Bagwell meets another prostitute. Scofield gets the boat he had ordered before getting incarcerated and the brothers start to sail before Scofield getting a message on his website from Sucre about Bagwell's situation, which is actually sent by Mahone.
| 43 | 21 | "Fin Del Camino" | Bobby Roth | Matt Olmstead & Seth Hoffman | March 26, 2007 | 2AKJ21 | 8.24 |
Scofield leaves Burrows and arrives at the hotel Bagwell is staying. He reunites with Sucre and Bellick and they decide to work together to reach their goals. They lock the Company agents outside after following Bagwell to another location and enter the house, where Bagwell has put a dead body and called the police, who arrive and arrest Bellick while the others escape, having captured Bagwell. Meanwhile, Mahone has been tailing Scofield too, but is intercepted by Burrows, who wants revenge for Aldo's death. Kellerman attempts to kill himself; but his gun is jammed and his sister states that he can begin anew. Bagwell escapes on the way to the embassy, with Sucre getting wounded. Scofield locks Bagwell for the police to capture him and leaves with the money. In the meantime, Tancredi is nearly convicted in the court until Kellerman arrives to testify for her. Scofield arrives at the boat before Mahone calling and telling him to bring the money and the boat in exchange for Burrows.
| 44 | 22 | "Sona" | Kevin Hooks | Paul Scheuring | April 2, 2007 | 2AKJ22 | 8.12 |
Scofield convinces a local drug-selling group to help him. Meanwhile, Kellerman reveals his missions and Burrows and Tancredi's innocence. She is exonerated and Kellerman is arrested. Scofield arrives with boat to the warehouse Mahone is keeping Burrows. Mahone calls the police and reports a murder. Kim arrives and a fight ensues between his men and Mahone. The brothers escape and Mahone gets in the boat before the police arriving and finding drugs in it, leading to Mahone's arrest. Bagwell is revealed to have been collaborating with the Company, but they leave him to go to jail. The brothers arrive in another boat Scofield has bought and find Tancredi, who reveals that Burrows is exonerated thanks to Kellerman's testimony. Kim arrives and is fatally shot by Tancredi. The police arrive and they start running. Scofield takes Tancredi hostage in order to get arrested and she be left alone. Tancredi disappears before Burrows can find her. Bellick tells Sucre to free him in order to find Delgado. Kellerman's transfer vehicle is attacked by masked men. Scofield and Mahone arrive in Sona Prison. The General states that this was exactly what they wanted.

== Production ==
=== Filming ===
Filming began on June 15, 2006, in Dallas, Texas due to a close proximity of rural and urban settings. Executive producer Matt Olmstead stated that the filming location was changed from Chicago in the first season to Dallas in the second season because the characters were on the run. Many locations were needed to represent various American towns, which Dallas provided, whereas locations within Chicago took several hours to travel between. Olmstead noted, "It really came down to a financial thing." Other locations that were considered for filming were New Mexico, Arizona and Louisiana. Dallas was chosen because of its "resourcefulness, cost effectiveness and variety with regard to activities available for the crew", which was considered to be a major component for the final decision. Filming took place in Dallas for nine to ten months, where 20 of the 22 episodes were shot. The series was expected to bring $50 million into the city of Dallas. For the final three episodes of the second season, filming took place in Pensacola, Florida to represent Panama. Filming for each episode took place over eight days, which contributed approximately $1.4 million to the local economy.

== Release ==
=== Critical reception ===
Mike Duffy of the Detroit Free Press commended the premiere for delivering "rocking good entertainment," and living up to the standard set by the first season. Duffy praised the "motley crew of cellblock characters" and the "taut, ingenious storytelling of series creator Paul T. Scheuring and his staff." Robert Bianco of USA Today commented on the "harebrained absurdities that have swamped this show", and accused the writers of being "incredibly lazy" for the continuous use of the tattoo as an "all-purpose plot fix". Ahsan Haque and Christopher Monfette of IGN credited the creators for not being afraid to take risks, which they felt "paid off for the most part". The reviewers found the biggest success factors to be "the constant swerves and twists" throughout the season, and "the development of the hero-villain relationship between Scofield and Mahone".

The addition of Mahone was well received by critics, who often referred to him as Michael's nemesis. Rob Owen of the Pittsburgh Post-Gazette found Mahone to be "a far more worthy adversary for Michael than prison guard Brad Bellick... who's still after the convicts but seems like a cartoon compared to the Inspector Javert-like Mahone." Brian Zoromski from IGN believes that the "strongest portions of 'Manhunt' deal with the introduction of a new character, an FBI Agent named Alexander Mahone, played by the great character actor William Fichtner." Digital Spy's Ben Rawson-Jones praised the "wonderful" Fichtner, claiming he "quickly became more appealing than the brooding hero himself". Robert Bianco of USA Today said that Fichtner was a welcome addition to the cast, and Andy Dehnart from MSNBC called Mahone the best new character of the second season.

=== Ratings ===
The premiere of the season obtained an average of 9.40 million American viewers, a decrease from the 10.50 million viewers who watched the series premiere, and the 10.24 million viewers who watch the first-season finale. The season obtained its largest audience with the episode "Chicago", which averaged 10.12 million viewers; however, the season finale received one of the lowest audiences in the series' history with 8.12 million viewers. The season averaged 9.30 million American viewers for all 22 episodes. Out of all regular primetime programming that aired during the 2005–2006 American television season, Prison Break ranked #51 out of #142, according to the Nielsen ratings system. In Australia, the season premiere was watched by an average of 1.22 million viewers, however ratings dropped consistently throughout the season. In the United Kingdom, ratings declined from an average audience share of 9% in the first season to 8.5% in the second. The season's penultimate episode, "Fin Del Camino", was viewed by an average of 1.20 million viewers, gaining a 7% audience share. As a result of the declining ratings during the season, Five decided not to air the third season and it was picked up by Sky1. Prison Break was simulcast in Canada on Global, where it ranked in the top ten of the highest rated television series.

=== Awards ===
The season was nominated for five awards, winning one. Dominic Purcell won the Australian Film Institute International Award for Best Actor. Work on the episode "Disconnect" was nominated for two Motion Picture Sound Editors Golden Reel Awards. Music editor David Klotz was nominated for Best Sound Editing in Music for Television — Short Form. The supervising sound editor, along with four Foley artists and four sound effects editors were nominated for Best Sound Editing in Sound Effects and Foley for Television — Short Form. At the 2007 Teen Choice Awards, Wentworth Miller was nominated for Choice TV Actor: Drama, and Robert Knepper was nominated for Choice TV: Villain.

== Home media release ==
Prison Break: The Complete Second Season
| Set details | | Special features |
| 22 episodes; 6-disc set; 1.78:1 aspect ratio; Subtitles: English, Spanish, French; English (Dolby Digital 5.1 Surround) | | Audio commentaries: "Manhunt"; "Otis"; "Map 1213"; "Dead Fall"; "Unearthed"; "Rendezvous"; "John Doe"; "The Message"; "Sweet Caroline"; "Panama"; "Sona"; Deleted scenes: Reinvention of a Series featurette; Turning Dallas into America featurette; Prison Break Theme: Ferry Corsten Breakout Mix |
Release dates
| United States; Canada | United Kingdom | Australia; New Zealand |
| September 4, 2007 | August 2, 2007 | September 19, 2007 |
