= John Doe (Prison Break) =

- Prison Break episode
- Episode no.: Season 2 Episode 14
- Directed by: Kevin Hooks
- Written by: Matt Olmstead &; Nick Santora
- Production code: 2AKJ14
- Original air date: January 22, 2007

Guest appearances
- Daniel Allar as "Avocado" Balz-Johnson; Steve Barnes as Agent Drucker; Danielle Campbell as Gracey Hollander; K. K. Dodds as Susan Hollander; Andra Fuller as Trey; Dell Johnson as IDOC captain; Helena Klevorn as Dede Franklin; Jeff Perry as Terrence Steadman; Steven Chester Prince as Agent Blondie; Lester "Rasta" Speight as Banks; Christian Stolte as Keith Stolte; Callie Thorne as Pam Mahone; Quinn Wermeling as Zack Hollander

Episode chronology
← Previous "The Killing Box"	Next → "The Message"
- Prison Break (season 2)

"John Doe" is the thirty-sixth episode of the American television series Prison Break and is the fourteenth episode of its second season. The episode was aired on January 22, 2007, after a seven-week break. It was written by Matt Olmstead and Nick Santora, and directed by Kevin Hooks. The title, "John Doe", commonly refers to an unidentified male or a male with no name. Coincidentally, John Doe is also the name of a television series in which Dominic Purcell (who plays Lincoln Burrows) was the title character. The episode mainly focuses on the meeting of the characters Lincoln Burrows and Terrence Steadman. Regarding the casting of this episode, series regulars Sarah Wayne Callies (who plays Sara Tancredi) and Amaury Nolasco (who plays Fernando Sucre) did not appear in this episode.

== Summary ==
C-Note (Rockmond Dunbar) is at a campground with his RV and his daughter Dede (Helena Klevorn) in Mound City, Nebraska. She asks him if her mother Kaycee is in trouble. Dissatisfied with C-Note's reply, she stays in the RV, while C-Note makes a telephone call to Trey (Andra Fuller).

Trey is at the North Dakota courthouse, waiting to see his incarcerated sister Kayce. He tells C-Note that after speaking to the lawyer, he believes that she will make bail. C-Note informs Trey that he plans to vanish with Dede and Kayce in Alaska, where C-Note's Army buddy knows where he can get a fish hatchery job, "no questions asked". Incensed, Trey asks his brother in law, "You want her to jump bail now?"

One phone call later, Trey tells C-Note that Kayce did not make bail as planned. C-Note offers to turn himself in, but Trey says that it will not get Kayce released, and that if both parents are incarcerated, Dede will be sent to a foster home.

T-Bag (Robert Knepper) is in Ness City, Kansas, in the home of his former girlfriend Susan Hollander (K.K. Dodds). T-Bag tells Susan that he believes that when she spit at him in Fox River State Penitentiary, it proves that she still has strong feelings for him. When she tries to plead with him, saying that she never told the children who he was, he is further convinced that redemption is within his reach. Susan attempts to grab a gun from her drawer, but is unable to reach for it in time.

Susan's children, Gracie (Danielle Campbell) and Zach (Quinn Wermeling) arrive at home. Blissfully unaware of T-Bag's true nature, they run to embrace him. Using Susan's story that he quickly took a job at an offshore oil rig, T-Bag told everyone that he lost his hand at the oil rig due to an accident, but his lawyers successfully sued them for five million dollars (one million dollars for "each finger"). He tells the Hollander family he can do whatever he wants now, and would like to do nothing more than to be with them.

As the children watch television with T-Bag and a tense Susan, the latter feigns a beverage spill to leave the room. T-Bag follows her and when he sees her attempting to get to the drawer with the gun in it, T-Bag yells at her loudly, brandishing the firearm. Hearing the commotion, the children approach, while Zach attempts to hit T-Bag with his skateboard. T-Bag evades the attack, takes the family hostage, and begins to board up the front door.

Former Captain of the prison guards Brad Bellick (Wade Williams), now an inmate, is standing in a Fox River recreation yard. He draws the attention of a robust African-American inmate named Banks (Lester "Rasta" Speight) who coerces him to give him his dessert during mealtime in exchange for protection. Banks strikes Bellick across the face, drawing the attention of Corrections officer Stolte (Christian Stolte), who breaks up the fight. Emasculated, Bellick agrees to Banks' proposal.

During mealtime, Bellick fulfills his agreement by giving Banks a chocolate brownie. Banks reneges on the deal by saying now he must now get five desserts, one for him, and four for his gang of inmates. Bellick replies that he has candy in his pocket; he brandishes a shlock (a sock filled with batteries, used in prison fights) and bludgeons Banks repeatedly. He walks away while sirens blare loudly.

Stolte appears outside Bellick's cell, telling him that tonight, some corrupt guards paid by Banks will open the cell doors, while Banks and his gang will attack him. Bellick asks Stolte for help, and Stolte replies that he is helping by warning him. He further explains that the night shift CO's are only there because Bellick assigned them there when he was captain of the guards, and that they will have no sympathy for him.

Bellick begs his cellmate Avocado (Daniel Allar) for help, but he replies that while Bellick may have the top bunk in their cell, he owes him nothing outside. As Banks' henchmen intimidate Bellick by repeatedly singing his name "Brad-lee", Bellick screams that he is not afraid of them. The next sound is the clanging of open cell doors.

A corrections officer covering the perimeter of the Albuquerque, New Mexico tunnel that the escaped brothers vanished from responds to a ringing mobile phone, only to find the body of FBI Agent Alexander Mahone (William Fichtner). He responds to the call, speaking to US Secret Service Agent William Kim (Reggie Lee). The officer identifies himself, and says that Mahone has been shot.

Agent Alexander Mahone is in an Albuquerque hospital bed, recovering from a gunshot wound he received from traitorous agent Paul Kellerman (Paul Adelstein). The moment he wakes up, the agent that killed Veronica and appeared in Sara's apartment gives Mahone a mobile telephone. He slowly reaches for it, holds it to his ear, and hears the voice of Agent Kim. Kim tells Mahone that Kellerman informed him that the escaped brothers had shot him, but that he managed to kill both of them shortly afterward; he replies with sardonic laughter that Kellerman is lying; he was the one that shot him, and that the brothers are most likely still alive.

Mahone informs Kim and the agent who killed Veronica that he will no longer work for The Company, even if it means doing his time for the death of Oscar Shales. Moments later, Mahone receives a frantic telephone call from his wife Pam (Callie Thorne), that their son Cameron had just been hit by a car. Mahone tells Pam that he will be there. Against medical advice, Mahone quickly left the hospital, presumably to see his family in Durango, Colorado. Once outside, the agent who killed Veronica taunted Mahone, saying that a broken tibia could mean a host of long term complications. Mahone responded with rage.

Agent Mahone called Agent Kim, telling him that he will return to his original mission. The body of the taunting agent who killed Veronica lies in Mahone's vehicle.

Michael Scofield (Wentworth Miller) and Lincoln Burrows (Dominic Purcell) ride in a black SUV with Kellerman. Before Kellerman can explain much beyond saying that "the enemy of the enemy is my friend", he instructs the brothers to hide as they approach a police roadblock.

The police officer is shown Kellerman's government identification, but he continues to insist that all vehicles must be inspected. Kellerman replies that precious seconds are being spent, and that he will take down every officer's name and make sure that they're all fired. A senior police officer appears and instructs them to let Kellerman, busy dialing on his mobile phone, pass unscathed.

Moments after they escape the roadblock, Lincoln quickly remembers that Kellerman was the man who tried to kill him days before he and Michael escaped from Fox River. Lincoln immediately brandishes his gun, and seizes Kellerman, while their SUV careens out of control. Their vehicle pulled over, Lincoln holds his gun to Kellerman's head demanding why he shouldn't kill him right now. Kellerman replies with, "Because I know where Terrence Steadman (Jeff Perry) is."

Kellerman arranges for the three of them to board a private jet, using his moniker "Owen Kravecki". They land at a Cutback, Montana airfield, en route to Steadman's hideout in Blackfoot, Montana.

Bill Kim's underling discovers that Kellerman and the brothers are en route to Terrence Steadman, and tries to stop their plane from taking off. The underling replies that the plane has already landed in Montana. Seething, Agent Kim contacts agents at Steadman's home and informs them of Kellerman's plan.

The agents stationed in Blackfoot talk to Steadman, informing him that he will have to leave the home immediately. As they're at the frontdoor, Kellerman, Scofield, and Burrows arrive in a car, and secure Steadman. Kim is quickly informed of the situation and orders an agent to kill everyone, including Steadman. The agent draws his weapon but before he can carry out this order, Kellerman shoots him and his partner.

The quartet arrive at the Cutback motel, where Kellerman tells the brothers that they will take Steadman to Washington, D.C. They would escape to Canada through Glacier National Park and re-enter the United States through New York. Once in Washington DC, they would show Steadman to politicians sympathetic to Aldo Burrows' cause.

Kellerman further informs the brothers that Steadman is just a John Doe; his fingerprints were burned off, his teeth were removed, and he even had plastic surgery to alter key physical features. It would be imperative to keep Steadman alive, so he could talk. Steadman takes the time to ridicule Kellerman by calling him the "Serf that would be King", alleging that Kellerman had proposed marriage to his sister Caroline Reynolds several years ago.

Unwilling to cooperate with Kellerman much less trust him, Michael takes the telephone, asks for a television news channel, and informs them of his identity and that he would like to turn himself in.

Unable to cope with the deaths of so many people including his beloved Veronica Donovan, Lincoln angrily points a gun at Steadman's face. Kellerman and Scofield successfully implore Burrows to back down, but Steadman quickly grabs Lincoln's gun hanging from the back of his pants, turns the gun on himself, and after unsuccessful negotiation from Michael, pulls the trigger.

The blood spattered painting and walls of the motel room were soon illuminated by the multicolored lights of police squad cars, as the sirens began to sound.

== Production details ==
Marshall Allman (who plays L. J. Burrows), who has been listed as a regular cast member from the series pilot, was removed from the opening credits. The car Kellerman drives is usually a Chevrolet Suburban but in one scene it was replaced with a Chevrolet Tahoe

== Reception ==
As the first episode to be aired in 2007, the episode obtained an average of 9.9 million viewers and was placed second in terms of viewership for the Monday 8:00pm timeslot, with a 6.6% household rating and 10% household share.

This episode received both positive and negative reviews. The critics mainly focused on the death of the character Terrence Steadman, who was the most important piece of evidence in proving the innocence of the protagonist Lincoln Burrows prior to this episode. Vinay Menon from the Toronto Star wrote a critique of the episode which included this comment: "It also contains confusion. And trace levels of frustration. I mean, what the hell? Terrence Steadman is now dead? Can I please have 35 hours of my life back?" Similarly, MediaBlvd Magazine's John Keegan was critical of the peripheral stories of the episode, stating, "Right now, many of these side stories suffer from the fact that they don’t really impact the main story, and they are easily dismissed as a result."

On the other hand, iFMagazine's Peter Brown remarked that, "It's obvious the series is taking another turn from them running from the law to proving that there is something going on other than just convicts escaping. All-in-all it will make for good viewing on one of the best shows on TV." Also, Bill Harris of the Toronto Sun commented that, "First up comes Prison Break, and we have to say, our heart almost jumped out of our chest at least three times when watching tonight's new episode, titled "John Doe". Even if you aren't an action connoisseur, this really is what action TV is all about."

Overall, Brian Tallerico of ugo.com gave "John Doe" a B+ grade, stating, "Sure, Prison Break is over-the-top, but, like its brother 24, it moves so quickly that you can't stop to notice the continuity errors and unbelievable behavior because you don't even have time to catch your breath."
