= The New Adventures of Zorro =

The New Adventures of Zorro can refer to:

- The New Adventures of Zorro (1981 TV series)
- The New Adventures of Zorro (1997 TV series)
