= The Killing Box =

- Prison Break episode
- Episode no.: Season 2 Episode 13
- Directed by: Bobby Roth
- Written by: Zack Estrin
- Production code: 2AKJ13
- Original air date: November 27, 2006

Guest appearances
- Daniel Allar as "Avocado" Balz-Johnson; Jason Davis as Agent Wheeler; Tim DeZarn as Salty vet; K. K. Dodds as Susan Hollander; Bruce DuBose as Greg Nagel; Dell Johnson as IDOC captain; Sylvia Kelegian as Denise; Max Kirsch as Young Lincoln; Phillip Edward Van Lear as Louis Patterson; Reggie Lee as Bill Kim; Justin Meeks as Pilot; Dylan Minnette as Young Michael; Leon Russom as Pad Man; Brandon Smith as Ed Pavelka

Episode chronology
← Previous "Disconnect"	Next → "John Doe"
- Prison Break (season 2)

"The Killing Box" is the thirty-fifth episode of the American television series Prison Break and is the thirteenth episode of its second season. Broadcast on November 27, 2006, it was also the last episode to be aired in 2006 in the United States. The episode is written by Zack Estrin and directed by Bobby Roth. The majority of the events in this episode take place on June 5, a day after Michael's rendezvous with the coyote. The fictional Fox News report in this episode announces that "less than ten days" has passed since the Fox River escape.

This episode marks the first time the series' protagonist, Michael Scofield, and agent Paul Kellerman, have appeared in a scene together, aside from a brief glimpse in a car in "English, Fitz or Percy". Regarding the casting of this episode, regular cast members Marshall Allman (who plays L. J. Burrows) and Rockmond Dunbar (who plays C-Note) do not appear in this episode.

== Summary ==
Michael Scofield (Wentworth Miller) and Lincoln Burrows (Dominic Purcell) are held at gunpoint by Agent Alexander Mahone (William Fichtner) while Michael's mobile telephone rings. Before Mahone can shoot the two brothers, the United States Border Patrol arrives. An officer tells Mahone to drop his weapon while they apprehend Michael and Lincoln.

Fernando Sucre's (Amaury Nolasco) plane is being chased by military jets near the American border into Mexico. Sucre believes that the military can't follow them past the border, but the pilot tells him that all changed after 9/11 and that their only hope of survival is to escape the plane with parachutes. The pair jump out of the plane, and land in the Sonoran Desert. Later, Sucre glances at the dead pilot (with an unopened parachute), killed on impact, before he walks away into the desert.

T-Bag (Robert Knepper) is at Pratt, Kansas veteran's hall. Pretending to be a veteran, T-Bag asks a veteran playing pool where to get a prosthetic hand. He tells him to go to a VA Hospital. When T-Bag says that money is no object for him, the veteran throws an orientation slur at him, while T-Bag gazes ominously at the veteran's prosthetic hand.

In Joliet, Illinois, the new Fox River warden Ed Pavelka is talking to the media, pledging not to make the same mistakes as his predecessor Henry Pope. He also announces his intention to swiftly execute Lincoln Burrows, while Michael Scofield will probably get life in prison for the escape.

The brothers are taken to a Las Cruces, New Mexico holding facility, where the authorities are preparing them for their return to Fox River. Michael's phone vibrates in an evidence bag and the brothers discuss how they will contact Sara Tancredi. Michael asserts himself, demanding to have a phone call. The officer replies that it will have to wait until he is back at Fox River.

Agent Kim tells Mahone to kill Michael and Lincoln, but Mahone protests, stating that they are in a room filled with law enforcement officers. Kim replies by threatening Mahone's family. In an adjacent room, Mahone brandishes his sidearm, briefly pointing it at himself.

Newly fitted with the veteran's prosthetic hand, T-Bag stalks a United States Postal Service worker named Denise at a nearby bus stop. Following her to a diner, he charms her and finds himself in her home. He promises to meet her at work to take her to a restaurant. Upon meeting her at work, T-Bag persuades her to give him the address of his ex-girlfriend Susan Hollander (K. K. Dodds), who turned him in to America's Most Wanted years ago. Denise is shocked to see a wanted poster behind T-Bag with his face on it, resulting in T-Bag murdering her.

Susan Hollander opens the door to her new Ness City, Kansas home, not expecting to see escaped serial killer Theodore "T-Bag" Bagwell at her doorstep, just where he promised her he would be during their previous meeting in Fox River State Penitentiary.

In the meantime, Brad Bellick (Wade Williams) is at the Greeley County, Kansas district court, as the county prosecutor (Andrew Sensenig) makes his case to deny bail. The prosecutor played a recording of the threatening phone call to the murdered Roy Geary for the courtroom to hear as the judge denies bail for Bellick. Later, in a holding facility, Bellick's public defender Greg Nagel (Bruce DuBose) tells him that there's a good chance he will get the death penalty unless he agrees to plead guilty and receive a 25-year sentence. Bellick agrees, under the condition that he be transferred to Illinois, so he can be near his mother.

Bellick later arrives, talking to Correctional Officer Louis Patterson (Phillip Edward Van Lear), asking him to put him in Ad Seg and to later enroll him in a work release program. Patterson replies that the CO's no longer run the prison, and that he will be sent to the general population. His new cellmate is Avocado (Daniel Allar), who, Bellick, in his CO capacity, earlier used to punish Fox River inmate David "Tweener" Apolskis. The scene of Bellick being placed in General Population is reminiscent of the shot of Michael in his prison cell in the series pilot (in fact the shot is the same one used in the pilot, with Bellick's cell pasted over Michael's upon close inspection you can see that the inmates in adjacent cells are all in the same positions as they are in the Pilot).

Sara Tancredi (Sarah Wayne Callies) continues to try to contact Michael with no success, not knowing the fate of the brothers until she sees the news report of their recapture at an electronics store. Shocked, she alters her appearance in a public restroom by cutting her hair with a razor. Dropping her real identification in a trash bin, Sara blends into the crowd.

Paul Kellerman (Paul Adelstein) speaks to Agent Kim (Reggie Lee), pleading for his job back. He threatens to use his information concerning Caroline Reynolds should Kim refuse. The Pad Man, a mysterious operative superior to agent Kim, writes instructions to him, telling him to switch the phone to speaker mode and to ask Kellerman what kind of plan he has in mind. Kellerman reveals a plan for an ambush of the brothers in Albuquerque, New Mexico, en route to the brothers' trip back to Fox River, where their murder will look like an accident. Agent Kim, on the Pad Man's instructions, later tells Mahone to kill Kellerman during the crossfire. Mahone protests, saying he is not Jack Ruby. Kim replies that Ruby acted alone, while the US Government would be behind his action.

Michael and Lincoln's transport van is stalled in an Albuquerque tunnel by a jackknifed semi, setting up the ambush. The brothers manage to escape their transport van, as Lincoln's shackles are left unlocked, and a guard (Kelly O'Neil Jackson), Kellerman's alleged contact in the Illinois DOC, suspiciously leaves his keys behind. Although suspicious that the set up is too easy, Michael eventually lets Lincoln convince him to make a break for it, and the brothers escape through a metal door, and through a series of small tunnels, until they are caught between Kellerman and Mahone. As the brothers prepare to die, Kellerman fires his weapon at Mahone who is shot and falls. Kellerman tells both Lincoln and Michael, "President Reynolds ruined your life, she ruined my life. You want to take that bitch down? You just found your inside man, but it's got to be right now." Both Lincoln and Michael follow Kellerman.

== Reception ==
This episode attained the largest audience so far for the second season in the United States with 9.6 million viewers, a 10% share of the 18–49 demographic. This surpassed the 9.4 million viewers recorded for the second-season premiere. Concerning T-Bag's storyline, reviewers from both the Arizona Daily Star and The Palm Beach Post commented on his appearance and his particular storyline in this episode. While the critic from The Palm Beach Post described T-Bag's "unsightly grille, tattered 'do, one hooded eye, and that butt-ugly hoodie he's always wearing" and questioned how the character could have "charmed a member of the opposite sex with ease", the critic from the Arizona Daily Star rhetorically asked about T-Bag's attraction, "What did she see in him? Was it the twinkle in that bruised eye? The bad dye job? The slimy innuendo? The probably stinky clothes he wore?".

The plot twist towards the end of the episode with Kellerman deciding to help Michael and Lincoln in the interest of self-preservation also prompted some reactions from the critics. The critic from TV Guide said that it was "quite shocking to see the moment when it all went down" while the critic from the Arizona Daily Star "wanted to give Kellerman a big wet kiss".

Overall, this episode obtained a positive feedback from most of the critics. While the reviewer from the TV Fodder began his review with "Holy crap. To the folks over at "Lost", this is how you do a Fall Finale. Where to begin?", the critic from The Palm Beach Post concluded his review with "Prison Break's fall finale was certainly appealing. Can't wait 'til Jan. 22." Similarly, the critic from The San Diego Union-Tribune commenced his review with "Nothing gets the heart beating like a finale episode of Prison Break." and gave the episode an A+ grade. Because a cliffhanger was expected for this episode since it was the last to be aired in 2006, the critic from TV Guide commented that this episode surpassed her expectations, "Since it was the fall finale, I knew we’d be in for one crazy Prison Break ride, and it actually was even better than I had expected." The critic from the Arizona Daily Star exerted his enthusiasm for the next episode in January, 2007 by ending his review with "It's only 56 days. Only 1,344 hours. 80,640 minutes. 4,838,400 seconds... Mark your calendars. Prison Break returns Jan. 22". He also compared this episode's cliffhanger with Desperate Housewives's cliffhanger, stating that, "I said yesterday that the Desperate Housewives cliffhanger was one of the best ever, but Prison Break just upped the ante."
