= Manhunt (Prison Break) =

- Prison Break episode
- Episode no.: Season 2 Episode 1
- Directed by: Kevin Hooks
- Written by: Paul Scheuring
- Production code: 2AKJ01
- Original air date: August 21, 2006

Guest appearances
- Peter Stormare as John Abruzzi; Stacy Keach as Henry Pope; Jeff Perry as Terrence Steadman; Phillip Edward Van Lear as Louis Patterson; DuShon Monique Brown as Katie Welsh; Steven Chester Prince as Agent Blondie; Laura Wade as Syd; Marc Macaulay as Agent Ives; Ranjit Chowdhry as Dr. Marvin Gudat; Charles Baker as Camper guy; Stuart Greer as Hunter; Terry Parks as C.O. Rivers; Carlisle Studer as Grace; Katherine Willis as Agent Foley

Episode chronology
← Previous "Flight"	Next → "Otis"
- Prison Break (season 2)

"Manhunt" is the second season premiere episode of the American television series Prison Break and the twenty-third episode overall. The episode was first aired on August 21, 2006 in the United States. It is written by series creator Paul Scheuring and directed by Kevin Hooks, who directed the season finale of season one, "Flight". William Fichtner is introduced as a new regular cast member, whose character is assigned to track down the eight escapees from Fox River State Penitentiary. The role of Terrence Steadman was recast to Jeff Perry, who replaces John Billingsley as the brother of Caroline Reynolds (based on how little time the character was seen clearly, series creator Paul Scheuring jokingly questioned in interviews whether Billingsley had ever even been on the show to begin with).

The episode's title refers to the subject of both the episode and the season as a whole; the statewide (which quickly becomes nationwide) manhunt for the Fox River 8. The series regular cast members who did not appear are Paul Adelstein (who plays Paul Kellerman) and Marshall Allman (who plays L. J. Burrows). Despite their roles as two of the eight prison escapees, the two recurring cast members Lane Garrison (who plays David "Tweener" Apolskis) and Silas Weir Mitchell (who plays Charles "Haywire" Patoshik) did not appear in this episode, though they did appear in brief flashbacks at the beginning of the episode.

== Plot ==
Eight hours after the escape, Michael, Lincoln, Abruzzi, C-Note and Sucre eventually manage to elude Captain Bellick and his team with the help of a freight train. Meanwhile, FBI Special Agent Alexander Mahone is assigned to lead a nationwide search for the escapees, this makes their escape even more difficult, as Mahone calls a press conference, and urges everybody watching the television broadcast to find the "Fox River 8." He also has a keen interest on Scofield, and wants to know everything about him. The escapees are found by a hunter, who attempts to turn them in. However, Abruzzi holds the hunter's young daughter hostage, and is able to get the hunter to drop his weapon, and gives Michael the keys to his Jeep Grand Cherokee. The five escapees board the SUV, en route to a storage room where Michael has some items ready.

Meanwhile, Mahone and Bellick use Michael's credit card invoices to find a storage room in Oswego, and each separately rush to the storage facility. It turns out to be a ruse of Michael's, as he is seen in a cemetery storage room, gathering shovels to unearth the ground at the grave of (R.I.P.) E. Chance Woods. Agent Mahone deciphers the message on Michael's tattoo ("Ripe Chance Woods") and arrives at the scene right after the escaped gang of five unearthed Michael's package and put on a fresh set of clothing. Lincoln takes the backpack Michael hid and found the brothers' fake passports. The five are able to escape to Oswego and blend in, despite being tailed by Agent Mahone.

Elsewhere, T-Bag finds a veterinary clinic of Dr. Marvin Gudat, and coerces him to reattach his left hand without the use of anesthesia. Dr. Sara Tancredi recovers from her drug overdose, and is interrogated by the FBI, who tells her that 8 prisoners escaped. After Nurse Katie's visit, Sara finds an origami swan inside her purse. Inside is a message "There's a plan to make all of this right", and a dotted code. The dot code on the origami swan that Sara found can be grouped into lines of numbers. The numbers are 3221243324 for the first line, 4221312231 for the second, and 23133121 for the third. Veronica discovers yet another secret from Terrence Steadman. He is being held captive, although somewhat willingly, inside the estate; the doors can be opened only from the outside, and the windows are bulletproof. Veronica receives a phone call from Lincoln after calling 911, and informs him of what she has learned. While she is on the phone with Lincoln, Company agents arrive and kill Veronica, where Lincoln could only listen and slips into grief. Mahone continues to study images of Michael's tattoos and other elements of his escape plan, saying it will tell him everything about where Michael and the others are going, so he can be there waiting for them when they get there.

== Production ==
"Manhunt" was the first episode of the series to be filmed in Texas after the cast and crew relocated due to the more suitable locations for the impending storyline. The cemetery scene and the following town scene are supposedly set in Oswego, Illinois in the episode. These scenes were actually filmed in McKinney, Texas. While the cemetery scene was filmed at Pecan Grove Cemetery in McKinney, the scene which followed as the fugitives escape into a neighbouring town, was filmed in downtown McKinney. Starting with this episode, the blue-tinted graphic used in the first season's commercial bumper which were shots of prison crawlways, is replaced by a sepia-tinted graphic of racing through fields and streets, reflecting the fact that the convicts have become fugitives.

== Reception ==
The premiere of the second season of Prison Break obtained an average of 9.4 million viewers in the United States, down from 10.5 million for the series premiere in August 2005. There was also a decrease of 20 percent in the 18-49 demographic compared to its series premiere, but its household rating grew from a 3.6 to a 3.9 during the last half hour. Australia's Ninemsn reports seemingly less than stellar ratings for the Australian premiere of the second season of Prison Break, "The second season opening of Prison Break attracted 1.2 million viewers, but that was hardly impressive for one of the network's most significant imports."

In the United Kingdom, the episode was given a rating of 2.29 million viewers, and was the fourth most viewed television broadcast for Five on that week. In France this episode was shown on November 6, 2006, not long after the finale of season one. It attracted 7.5 million viewers, and M6, the network that broadcasts Prison Break in France, received its fourth highest audience ever - 30.7% of the market share.
