= Stuart Greer =

American character actor (born 1959)

- Born: December 2, 1959 (age 66)
- Occupation: Character actor

Stuart Greer (born December 2, 1959) is an American retired character actor.

== Education ==
Greer began acting in stage productions while a student at the University of Arkansas at Little Rock before being accepted into the Professional Workshop at the Circle in the Square Theatre in New York City, where he studied from 1987 to 1989.

== Career ==
His first New York stage appearance was in the off-off Broadway production of Mayberry's Revenge at the Terry Schreiber Theater. After work in regional theater and years of jobs in warehouses and construction, he began acting in films and television at age 34. His feature film credits include I Know What You Did Last Summer, The Reaping, The Mechanic, Runaway Jury and Forty Shades of Blue, among others. He appeared in the Millennium Films release Homefront, as Lewis, which opened in November 2013. In seasons 2 & 3 of the Sundance series Rectify, he portrays Lid Comphrey. In five episodes of season two of the AMC series Turn: Washington's Spies, he portrays Warden Officer Yates. Greer plays Sheriff Bernie Watts in the 2015 film American Ultra. He plays Roman in the final two episodes of season six of The Walking Dead.

== Personal life ==
After suffering a stroke in October 2016, Greer retired from acting and relocated to Benton, Arkansas.

== Filmography ==
=== Film ===
Year	Title	Role	Notes
1995	The Expert	Joe Hazen	
1996	Box of Moonlight	Stinky	
1997	The Apostle	Texas State Trooper	
1997	I Know What You Did Last Summer	Officer	
1998	The Gingerbread Man	Detective Hal	
1998	Black Dog	Trooper	
2000	Remember the Titans	Marshall Assistant Coach	
2000	The Gift	Officer Huggins	
2000	Chasing the Dragon	Jack	
2003	Runaway Jury	Kincaid	
2004	Stateside	Drill Instructor #3	
2005	Forty Shades of Blue	Tom Skolnick	
2005	Glorious Mail	Bob McJunkins	Uncredited
2006	Glory Road	Kentucky Assistant Coach	
2006	Forgiven	Paul Blankenship	Uncredited
2006	Road House 2	Captain Chris Shilton	
2007	The Reaping	Gordon	
2011	The Mechanic	Ralph	
2011	Take Shelter	Army-Navy Dave	
2012	Mud	Miller	
2013	The Pardon	George McQuiston	
2013	Homefront	Lewis	
2015	American Ultra	Sheriff Watts	

=== Television ===
Year	Title	Role	Notes
1994	Crocodile Shoes	Pete	Episode: "The Trip"
1995	Big Dreams & Broken Hearts: The Dottie West Story	Owen	Television film
1995	A Horse for Danny	Slick	Television film
1996	American Gothic	Cody Parker	Episode: "Learning to Crawl"
1996	Country Justice	Man in Bar	Television film
1997	Orleans	Andre Biggs	Episode: "Pilot: Part 1"
1998	Mama Flora's Family	Foreman	2 episodes
1998–2000	Walker, Texas Ranger	Various roles	4 episodes
1999	Sons of Thunder	Doctor	Episode: "Underground"
2005	Elvis	Captain Beaulieu	2 episodes
2006	Thief	Billy Ray	2 episodes
2006	Prison Break	Hunter	Episode: "Manhunt"
2007	Ruffian	Dan Lasater	Television film
2014	Identity	Ericson	Television film
2014–2015	Rectify	Lid Comphrey	6 episodes
2015	Turn: Washington's Spies	Officer Yates	5 episodes
2016	The Walking Dead	Roman	2 episodes
