= Fin Del Camino =

- Prison Break episode
- Episode no.: Season 2 Episode 21
- Directed by: Bobby Roth
- Written by: Matt Olmstead; Seth Hoffman
- Production code: 2AKJ21
- Original air date: March 26, 2007

Guest appearances
- Jeremy Bacerra as Fireworks boy; Mark Harelik as Marty Gregg; Sean Hennigan as Judge; Tina Holmes as Kristine Kellerman; David Stokey as Junior Attorney; Callie Thorne as Pam Mahone

Episode chronology
← Previous "Panama"	Next → "Sona"
- Prison Break (season 2)

"Fin Del Camino" is the 43rd episode of the US television series, Prison Break and is the 21st episode of its second season. The English translation of the Spanish phrase, "fin del camino", is end of the road. Written by Matt Olmstead and Seth Hoffman, and directed by Bobby Roth, the episode first aired on March 26, 2007. The premise of the episode directly follows the events of the previous episode and includes two major plots with one taking place in Panama City and the other in Chicago. Regarding the casting of this episode, Rockmond Dunbar (who plays Benjamin Miles "C-Note" Franklin), does not appear in this episode.

== Summary ==
It is the third day of the trial of Doctor Sara Tancredi (Sarah Wayne Callies) in Chicago, Illinois. Despite objections from the prosecution, the judge allowed excerpts of Michael and Lincoln's "Declaration of Innocence" to be played for the jury and to be used as evidence. Meanwhile, Paul Kellerman (Paul Adelstein) hears about Sara's trial via a news report as he prepares to commit suicide. When his suicide attempt fails, due to his gun jamming, he calls his sister Kristine, who he confesses to about his previous misdeeds. Kristine (Tina Holmes) convinces him to start anew and that he can undo his wrongs. Paul Kellerman breaks into tears, as his sister embraces him tightly.

As Sara prepares herself to accept a plea bargain that will place her in a maximum security prison for twelve years, one of her lawyers announces that a new credible witness has come forward, willing to testify to Sara's accusation of conspiracy. To Sara's surprise, Paul Kellerman enters the courtroom.

Lincoln Burrows (Dominic Purcell) finds himself alone aboard the 'Christina Rose', docked in Panama and realizes his brother has gone to Panama City to find T-Bag (Robert Knepper).

Michael Scofield (Wentworth Miller) arrives in Panama City and quickly finds T-Bag at the Fin Del Camino hotel. He spots two undercover agents surveilling T-Bag. He is then met by Fernando Sucre (Amaury Nolasco) and Brad Bellick (Wade Williams). As Bellick brandishes his gun on Michael, Michael is told by Sucre that he had not posted the message on Europeangoldfinch.net. Michael puts two and two together and realizes the situation is a setup. Bellick and Michael reach a deal; while Bellick will get the money, Maricruz Delgado is to be unharmed and that T-Bag must be captured.

On his way to Panama City, Agent Alexander Mahone (William Fichtner) calls his wife, Pam (Callie Thorne). Their conversation leaves him with hope that he, his wife and his son might return to being a family again. Following this, Mahone makes telephone contact with the men surveilling T-Bag.

After setting off the fire alarm which forces T-Bag to leave the hotel, Michael, Sucre and Bellick stalk the two agents following T-Bag down a busy Panama City street. When Mahone attempts to join the fray, Lincoln suddenly strikes Mahone and drags him out of sight. The two fight, which Lincoln wins, before Mahone suddenly attacks him again and successfully captures him.

After T-Bag enters a building, Michael, Sucre and Bellick disarm the agents, who were following T-Bag, and eventually tie them up in an alley. Although Michael is suspicious of the two agents, he follows Sucre and Bellick into the building. It turns out to be a trap when T-Bag locks them in a room with a murdered prostitute as the police sirens draw near. They escape but Bellick is shot in the leg by T-Bag and is hindered from moving. As Bellick gets arrested by the Panamanian police, Michael and Sucre successfully capture T-Bag after he is hit by a car. While Sucre looks for a car, T-Bag refuses to reply Michael's questions about his "new friends". Sucre successfully hotwires an automobile and the three begin their trip to the American embassy, where they will leave T-Bag. However, T-Bag grabs a nearby screwdriver and stabs Sucre, which causes Michael to crash their car.

Leaving Sucre to a bystander to take him to a hospital, Michael chases T-Bag to a shack by a river. The two fight before Michael stabs T-Bag in his right arm and nails it to the floor. The police arrive at the shack, the police arrest T-Bag. After Michael leaves with the money and returns to the 'Christina Rose' to find his brother missing. As he attempts to make telephone inquiries to local hospitals to find Sucre, Michael receives a call from Lincoln. Lincoln tells Michael that he is sorry before giving Mahone the phone. Mahone tells Michael that he had captured Lincoln and that he needs to disappear as well. He gives Michael an ultimatum; his ship and the five million dollars (his plan) for his brother's life.

== Reception ==
On its original airdate, the episode was watched by an average of 8.01 million viewers, which was one of the lowest audience figures received by the series. In total viewership, the show was ranked behind ABC's Dancing With the Stars and a repeat episode of Deal or No Deal on NBC in its 8:00 pm timeslot. Overall, the episode obtained 5.2% household rating and 8% household share, with a 3.3/9 rating for the 18-49 demographic.
