= Monica Macer =

Monica Macer is a writer and producer. She is credited as the showrunner and executive producer of the new Netflix comedy-drama series Gentefied.

== Biography ==
Macer is a 1993 graduate of Vassar College. She began her career in theater arts in New York City.

She co-produced an independent feature film, Park Day, and won the Audience Award at the Urban World Film Festival for that movie.

She then focused on television. She worked as an assistant at Nickelodeon Movies and a creative executive for the Walt Disney Company. She was then selected by the Fox Writers Program. She was a producers' assistant for the second and third seasons of 24. She went on to become a writers' assistant for the first season of Lost in 2004. Macer and the Lost writing staff won the Writers Guild of America (WGA) Award for Best Dramatic Series at the February 2006 ceremony for their work on the first and second seasons. She became a story editor and writer on Prison Break. She was an executive story editor for the short-lived Knight Rider remake.

In February 2019, it was announced that Macer would be credited as an executive producer and showrunner for the upcoming Netflix comedy-drama series Gentefied. In July 2020, Macer was announced as showrunner for MacGyver after series creator Peter Lenkov was fired by CBS.

Macer is a member of the Motion Picture & Television Fund (MPTF) NextGen Board of Directors.

== Prison Break episodes ==
- 1.08 - "The Old Head" (written)
- 2.06 - "Subdivision" (written)
- 2.11 - "Bolshoi Booze" (co-written with Seth Hoffman)
