= Ismael 'East' Carlo =

Puerto Rican actor

Ismael "East" Carlo
- Born: Ismael Manny Carlo; January 29, 1942 (age 84); Cabo Rojo, Puerto Rico
- Other name: East Carlo
- Occupation: Actor
- Years active: 1975–present
- Children: 3

Ismael "East" Carlo (born January 29, 1942) is a Puerto Rican actor. He has sometimes been credited as East Carlo or Ismael East Carlo.

== Life and career ==
Carlo was born in Cabo Rojo, Puerto Rico, and raised in Spanish Harlem. He served in the U.S. Army after enlisting at age 17. He was stationed in Panama. From New York he moved to Florida, where he took a job as a janitor at a local theater and it was at that juncture his acting career started.

He started appearing in TV shows back in the 1970s, like his role in Caribe (1975) in the lady killer episode, he played lately the role of Don Diego in the comedy movie Bandidas (2006). He also appeared briefly in the series Prison Break, on episode 15 of the second season.

== Family ==
He has been married twice.

== Filmography ==
=== Television ===
Year	Title	Role	Episode Title(s)	Note
2011	True Blood	Don Santiago	"Me and the Devil"	
2009	Cold Case	Ramiro Valens	S07 Ep. 2 "Hood Rats"	
2007	Days of Our Lives	Alessandro Chavez	Ep. #1.10722	a.k.a.: Cruise of Deception: Days of Our Lives (USA: summer title); DOOL (USA: informal short title); Days (USA: short title)
2007	Ghost Whisperer	Man	"The Cradle Will Rock"	
2007	Prison Break	Old Mexican Man	"The Message"	aka Prison Break: On the Run (Australia: Season 2 title)
2005	Commander in Chief	Congressman Ferrer	"First Scandal"	
2003	George Lopez	Uncle Joe	S02 Ep. 13 "Super Bowl"	
2002	CSI: Miami	Basilio	S01 E03 "Wet Foot/Dry Foot"	aka "CSI: Weekends" (USA: promotional title)
2000	Family Law	Scott McClarran	S01 Ep. 21 "Second Chance"	
1999	The Parkers	Padre	"Quarantine"	
1998	Air America	Secretary Morales	"Hostage Situation"	
1998	Nash Bridges	Frank Dominguez, Joe's Father	"Special Delivery"	
1998	USA High	Hector	"Everybody Loves Raphael"	
1998	Michael Hayes	Varone	"Götterdämmerung"	
1997	413 Hope St.		"Redemption"	
1997	NYPD Blue	Ibarra	"Emission Impossible"	
1996	High Tide	Professor Don Arreggio	"Anything, Anytime, Anywhere: Part 2"	
1996	Nostromo	General Barrios		TV mini-series aka "Joseph Conrad's Nostromo" aka "Nostromo - Der Schatz in den Bergen" (Germany)
1994-1997	General Hospital	Hernando Rivera	unknown episodes	
1994	Murder, She Wrote	Sheriff Serafio Zuniga	"Crimson Harvest"	
1994	1993	Frank Fernandez	"Double Jeopardy"	
1994	1992	Juan Garcia	"Day of the Dead"	
1993	Roc	Mr. Mendez	"Shove It up Your Asprin"	a.k.a. "Roc Live"
1993	The Untouchables	Luis Murado	"Cuba: Part 1 & 2"	
1992	Silk Stalkings	Mariso	"Scorpio Lover"	
1992	Renegade		"Second Chance"	
1991	L.A. Law		"Monkey on My Back Lot"	
1991	The 100 Lives of Black Jack Savage	Gustavo	E04 "Deals Are Made to Be Broken"	aka "Black Jack Savage" (USA)
1990	Broken Badges	Enrique Cardenas	Pilot	
1990	Hunter	Pablo Torres	"Where Echoes End"	
1986	Hunter	Colonel Hector Ramirez	"High Noon in L.A."	
1990	Baywatch	Escudero	"Eclipse"	a.k.a. "Baywatch Hawaii" (USA: new title)
1990	Booker	Ricardo Flores	"The Life and Death of Chick Sterling"	a.k.a. "Booker, P.I."
1989	B.L. Stryker		"Auntie Sue"	
1989	Miami Vice	Chi-Chi	"Hard Knocks"	
1987	Miami Vice	Victor Vasquez	"Cuba Libre"	
1987-1988	Crime Story	Jorge Senterro	5 episodes	
1988	Supercarrier		"Rest and Revolution"	
1987	CBS Schoolbreak Special	Judge	"Juvi"	
1986	Sidekicks	Judge	"Catherine the Not-So-Great"	
1986	Hotel	Colonel Vargas / Hector	"Separations" / "Choices"	aka "Arthur Hailey's Hotel"
1986	Crazy Like a Fox		"The Road to Tobago"	
1986	Airwolf	Carlos / Sergeant / Sanchez	"Wildfire" / "Short Walk to Freedom" / "Mad Over Miami"	a.k.a. "Lobo del aire" (USA: Spanish title)
1983-1985	T. J. Hooker	Gunter Castro / Richard Garcia	"Rip-off" / "The Trial"	
1983-1985	The A-Team	Alvarez / Captain Cordoba / Salvador / Delgado	"Lease with an Option to Die" / "Sheriff of Rivertown" / "The Only Church In Town" / "A Small and Deadly War"	
1985	Fame	Perez	"Wishes"	
1984-1985	Santa Barbara	Ruben Andrade	23 episodes	
1984	Scarecrow and Mrs. King		"Savior"	
1984	Riptide	Bartender	"The Mean Green Love Machine"	
1982	Tales of the Gold Monkey	Dock Worker	"The Late Sarah White"	
1982	Cagney & Lacey	Enriquez	"Conduct Unbecoming"	
1982	Voyagers!	Jorge	"Bully and Billy"	
1981	The New Adventures of Zorro	Gaspar	13 episodes	
1981	Hill Street Blues	Coin Thief	"Fruits of the Poisonous Tree"	
1981	Lou Grant	Judge	"Reckless"	
1980	The Tarzan / Lone Ranger Adventure Hour	Gaspar		a.k.a. The Tarzan / Lone Ranger / Zorro Adventure Hour (USA: new title)
1979	Hart to Hart	Aguira	"Passport to Murder"	
1977	Baretta	First Junkie	"Open Season"	
1975	Caribe	Doctor	"Lady Killer"	

=== Film ===
Year	Film	Role	Note
2009	Double Duty	General Sloan	
2008	Polar Opposites	Alberto	
2006	For the Best	Boss	
2006	Wet Foot/Dry Foot	Man On Boat	
2006	Leila	Robbie	
2006	Bandidas	Don Diego	aka Bandidas (France)
2006	The Deal	Arias	a.k.a. El pacte (Spain: Catalan title)
2004	El padrino	Manny	a.k.a. El padrino: The Latin Godfather (USA: DVD title)
2003	El Matador	Mr. Ortega	
2002	Purpose	Fisherman	
2002	Fidel	Eddy Chibas	TV
2001	The Way She Moves	Ernesto	TV
2001	Almost a Woman	Don Julio	TV
2001	The Suitor	Mundo	TV
2000	A Family in Crisis: The Elian Gonzales Story		TV
1999	Y2K	Camarillo	aka Terminal Countdown (USA: DVD title)
1999	Wild Wild West	Mexican Dignitary	
1998	The Christmas Wish	Jose Rivera	TV
1998	Patch Adams	Hispanic Father	
1998	The Unknown Cyclist	Farm Worker	
1998	My Little Havana	Senor Grande	
1996	Eraser	Father Rodriguez	
1995	Criminal Hearts	Morcho	
1993	Huevos de oro	El Detective	aka Golden Balls aka Macho aka Uova d'oro (Italy)
1993	The Discoverers	Don Marcelino	
1992	Intent to Kill	Nick Gonzalez	
1992	Drug Wars: The Cocaine Cartel	General Fernando Osario	TV
1991	Wedlock	Chief Officer	a.k.a. Deadlock
1991	Fire: Trapped on the 37th Floor	Battalion Chief Rinosso	TV
1987	Love Among Thieves	Mazo	TV
1987	Juarez	Sergeant Quintana	TV
1983	Right of Way	Gardener	TV
1983	Sparkling Cyanide	Medical Examiner	aka Agatha Christie's Sparkling Cyanide (UK: complete title) TV
1983	Hotel	Hector	TV
1983	One More Chance	Gonzales	
1982	Farrell for the People	Judge Sanchez	TV
1980	Defiance	El Bravo	
1975	Beyond the Bermuda Triangle	aka Beyond This Place There Be Dragons (USA)	TV

=== Miscellaneous Crew ===
Year	Film	Role	Note
1994	Of Love and Shadows	ADR voice	aka De amor y de sombras (Argentina)
