= The New Adventures of Zorro (1981 TV series) =

- DVD Cover
- Genre: Western
- Created by: Johnston McCulley (characters)
- Written by: Arthur Browne Jr.; Robby London; Ron Schultz; Sam Schultz; Marty Warner
- Voices of: Henry Darrow; Julio Medina; Eric Mason; Don Diamond; Christine Avila; Socorro Valdez; Carl Rivas; Ismael 'East' Carlo
- Theme music composer: Ray Ellis; Norm Prescott
- Composers: Ray Ellis; Norm Prescott
- Country of origin: United States
- Original language: English
- No. of seasons: 1
- No. of episodes: 13

Production
- Producers: Don Christensen; Norm Prescott; Lou Scheimer
- Editors: Ron Fedele; Joe Gall; Hector C. Gika
- Running time: ~20 minutes
- Production companies: Filmation; Tokyo Movie Shinsha

Original release
- Network: CBS
- Release: September 12 – December 5, 1981

The New Adventures of Zorro is an American animated television series produced by Filmation in 1981. The series, which has 13 episodes, is based on the fictional character created by Johnston McCulley. It aired as part of The Tarzan/Lone Ranger/Zorro Adventure Hour.

This is the only series Filmation made in which they contracted an outside, third party animation studio (although the storyboards were created by Filmation themselves). The series was outsourced to Tokyo Movie Shinsha in Japan. All other series afterwards were animated internally by Filmation themselves. It was producer Norm Prescott's final series with Filmation, bringing to an end the 'rotating producers' wheel that Filmation was known for at the time. From Gilligan's Planet onwards, Lou Scheimer would handle production duties on his own.

== Plot ==
Don Diego de la Vega is a young man of high social position from the town of Los Angeles, who fights against tyranny under a secret identity: Zorro. He is helped by Tempest (originally "Tornado"), his black horse, and Miguel, a young swordsman (replacing Don Diego's traditional mute butler Bernardo). Miguel wears a disguise very similar to Zorro’s (but with different colors and without a cape) and rides a Palomino.

Ramón, the captain of the garrison, is Zorro’s main foe. Captain Ramón is helped in his task of capturing Zorro by González, a foolish sergeant who is friends with the De La Vega family. Sergeant González was a character from the original Zorro story 'The Curse of Capistrano'. He had been replaced by Sergeant Garcia on the Disney series. The actor who voiced González, Don Diamond, played Sergeant Garcia's companion Corporal Reyes.

== Voice cast ==
- Henry Darrow as Zorro
- Julio Medina as Miguel
- Don Diamond as Gonzales
- Eric Mason as Ramon
- Christine Avila as Maria
- Socorro Valdez as Lucia
- Carlos Rivas as Don Alejandro
- Ismael 'East' Carlo as Fray Gaspar

== Episodes ==
No.	Title	Written by	Original release date	Prod. code
1	"Three Is a Crowd"	Arthur Browne Jr.	September 12, 1981	101
Zorro sets out to recover the people's tax money from a band of pirates before the government's men can get their hands on it. But when a gang of thieves hear about the money and go after it as well, Zorro has his hands full.
2	"Flash Flood"	Arthur Browne Jr.	September 19, 1981	102
Zorro has his work cut out for him when a dam threatens to burst and flood the countryside. What doesn't help matters any is when a gang of crooks try to exploit the panic of the citizens.
3	"The Blockade"	Arthur Browne Jr.	September 26, 1981	103
Zorro risks his life to attack an enemy French man-of-war that has blockaded the port of San Pedro. But what Zorro doesn't know is that the enemy has set various traps for him.
4	"The Frame"	Ron Schultz; Sam Schultz	October 3, 1981	104
Zorro fights to clear his name when he is accused of crimes he did not commit. But as all the evidence he finds keeps pointing to him, Zorro realizes there are higher powers involved.
5	"Turnabout"	Ron Schultz; Sam Schultz	October 10, 1981	105
The tide starts to turn against Zorro. Now he has to find his way back and get himself back to the Zorro he once was.
6	"The Tyrant"	Marty Warner; Arthur Browne Jr.	October 17, 1981	106
A corrupt military ruler steals from the rich and taxes the poor, with no one but Zorro to stop him. But in order for Zorro to stop him he will have to go about it intelligently or risk being branded a traitor.
7	"Terremoto"	Arthur Browne Jr.	October 24, 1981	107
Things get off to a shaky start when Zorro attempts to free the prisoners from the island of Santa Catalina. At first Zorro is considered a traitor but once officials see how the prisoners were being treated he is cleared.
8	"The Trap"	Arthur Browne Jr.	October 31, 1981	108
En route to Santa Barbara, Zorro and Miguel fall victim to one of Captain Ramon's evil plans. Now they are at the mercy of the Captain, until Zorro comes up with an escape plan.
9	"Fort Ramon"	Robby London	November 7, 1981	109
Zorro tries to break into Fort Ramon to free a prisoner.
10	"The Take Over"	Robby London	November 14, 1981	110
Zorro must think fast when a bandit kidnaps the Governor General, and has himself declared ruler of California. But, unbeknownst to Zorro, the bandit is an old enemy.
11	"Double Trouble"	Arthur Browne Jr.	November 21, 1981	111
Two of Zorro's enemies team up to try to take him down.
12	"The Conspiracy"	Arthur Browne Jr.	November 28, 1981	112
Zorro gets wrapped up in a conspiracy and now the only way out is to solve it.
13	"The Mysterious Traveler"	Robby London	December 5, 1981	113
Zorro tries to figure out if recent events have been caused by an unknown stranger.

== Educational messages ==
Zorro showed the viewers information about California and the influence of Spanish language and culture in the region at the end of each episode. These kinds of educational messages were common in 1980's animated television series of Filmation. Other examples of this are the moral advice found in episodes of He-Man and the Masters of the Universe.

== Merchandising ==
In 1981, toy manufacturer Gabriel released a line of Zorro action figures that tied in with Filmation's animated series. The characters included in the toy line were Zorro, Miguel, Captain Ramon, Sergeant Gonzalez, Tempest (horse) and Picaro (horse).
