= Nick Santora =

American screenwriter (born 1970)

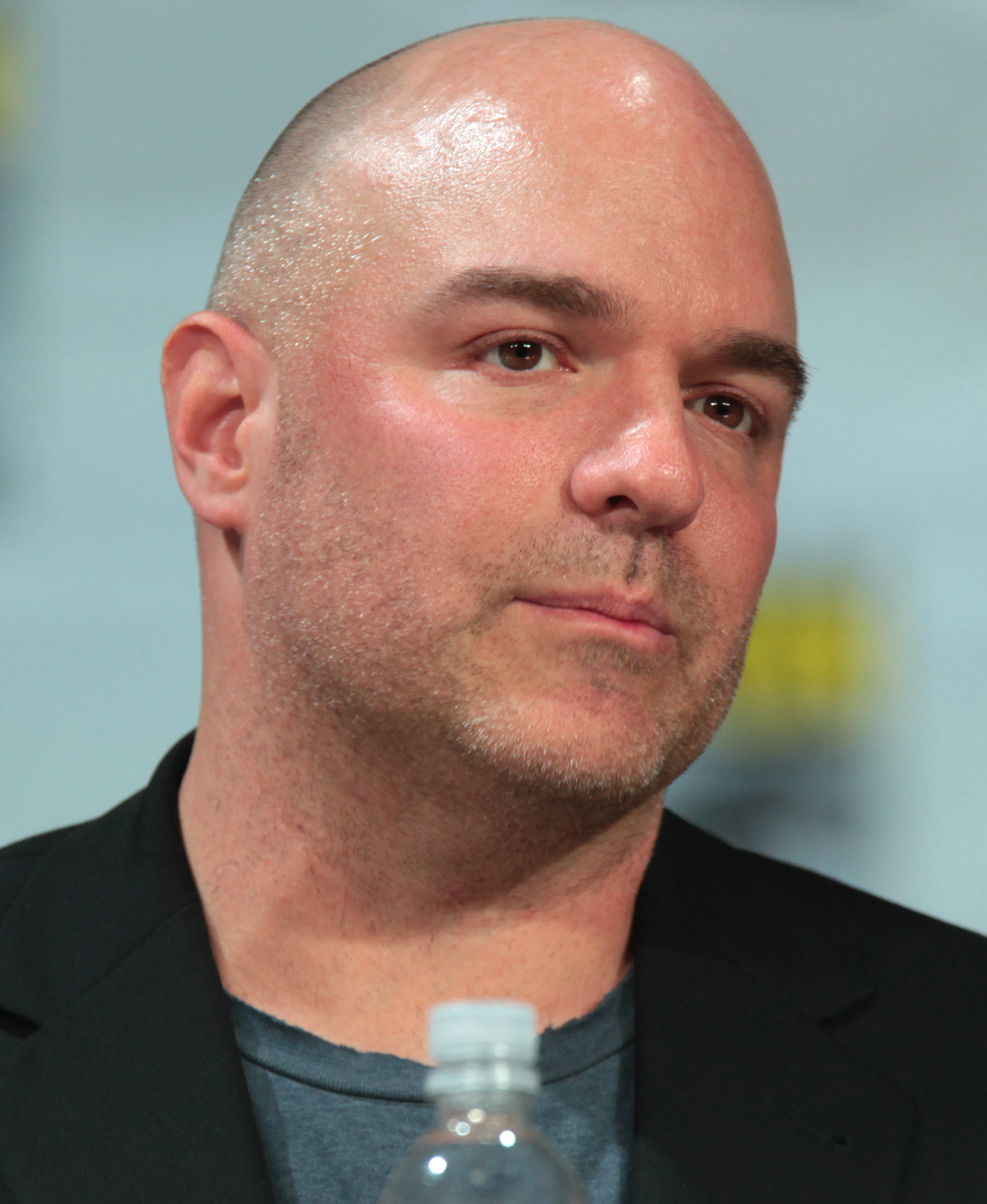
- Santora at the 2014 San Diego Comic-Con International
- Occupations: Writer, producer, author

Nick Santora (born 1970) is an American writer, producer, and author. He has written for and/or produced The Sopranos, The Guardian, Law & Order, Prison Break, Lie to Me, and Scorpion, and created and executive produced Breakout Kings.

== Career ==
Santora graduated from Washington University in St. Louis before attending Columbia Law School and practiced law for six years before giving up a full-time practice to write and produce television.

Santora also wrote and produced The Longshots, a film starring Ice Cube and Keke Palmer, and was a credited writer on the Lionsgate/Marvel Studios film Punisher: War Zone.

== Other work ==
Santora's first novel, Slip & Fall, was selected by Borders Books Stores to be the debut novel for their newly created publishing division. It was a National Best Seller. His second novel, Fifteen Digits, was published in 2012 by Little Brown's suspense/thriller imprint, Mulholland Books.

== Filmography ==
Film

- The Longshots (2008)
- Punisher: War Zone (2008)
- Safety (2020)
- Dog Gone (2023)
- Mr. Irrelevant: The John Tuggle Story (2026)

TV

Year	Title	Credited as	
Year	Title	Writer	Producer
2002	The Sopranos	Yes	No
2002–2004	The Guardian	Yes	Yes
2004–2005	Law & Order	Yes	Yes
2005–2009	Prison Break	Yes	Yes
2005–2009	Beauty and the Geek	No	Yes
2009–2010	Lie to Me	Yes	Yes
2011–2012	Breakout Kings	Yes	Yes
2012–2013	Vegas	Yes	Yes
2013	Hostages	Yes	No
2014–2018	Scorpion	Yes	Yes
2019	FBI	Yes	No
2020–2023	Most Dangerous Game	Yes	Yes
2020	The Fugitive	Yes	Yes
2022–present	Reacher	Yes	Yes
2023–2025	FUBAR	Yes	Yes
2026	Neagley	Yes	Yes
