= Paul Kellerman =

Character on American television series Prison Break

- Prison Break character
- Congressman Paul Kellerman
- First appearance: "Pilot" (2005)
- Last appearance: "The Prisoner's Dilemma" (2017)
- Created by: Paul Scheuring
- Portrayed by: Paul Adelstein

In-universe information
- Full name: Paul Kellerman
- Aliases: Owen Kravecki (S1E17); (S2E13 - S2E14); Roy Hawkings (S1E19); Lance (S2E03 - S2E07)
- Occupation: Former United States Army Special Forces Major; Former USSS Special Agent; Former employee of The Company; U.S. Congressman; Director US State Department
- Family: Kristine Kellerman (sister)

Paul Kellerman, also known as Owen Kravecki, is a fictional character from the American television series, Prison Break. Played by Paul Adelstein, the character was introduced to the series as a Secret Service special agent in the series pilot, but the actor was not listed as a regular cast member until the third episode. The character's role is most prominent in the series' conspiracy plot.

== Arc ==
=== Background ===
After graduating with honors from West Point, Paul Kellerman served in U.S. Army as part of the 2nd Ranger Battalion, 75th Ranger Regiment and eventually the U.S. Special Forces; achieving the rank of major. Kellerman served in the Gulf War and his awards include a Silver Star, a Bronze Star, a Purple Heart, an Army Commendation Medal and an Army Achievement Medal.

Although he had a promising future in the military, he received a better offer from the federal government: a leadership position within the Secret Service, and was soon assigned to Caroline Reynolds (Patricia Wettig), whom he has served for fifteen years. He eventually hardened into a ruthless fanatic, capable of suppressing his humanity to commit horrible crimes in the name of Caroline Reynolds. Due to his commitment to her plans, he became a key figure in the conspiracy that framed Lincoln Burrows (Dominic Purcell) for murder. Officially, as revealed in episode "The Rat", he is no longer listed as a member of the Secret Service or even as an employee of the Federal Government, and lives under the alias Owen Kravecki. Kellerman is at least 35 years old.

=== Season 1 ===
Along with his partner and long-time friend Danny Hale, Kellerman's role in the first half of the season is to prevent anyone from uncovering the Lincoln Burrows conspiracy. He goes to great lengths to do this, blackmailing and even murdering a number of innocent people on Reynolds' orders. Kellerman keeps a cool head throughout this, showing no remorse for what he has to do. But when Caroline Reynolds is revealed to be dealing with sinister corporate powers- simply called "The Company"- Kellerman is shown making his opposition known to her about this. Although Kellerman's position is briefly threatened by Company operative Quinn in the episode "Sleight of Hand", he is later able to handle the situation in the episode "And Then There Were 7" by secretly leaving Quinn to his death, and continues his mission to find and eliminate those who threaten the conspiracy. Kellerman is eventually forced to kill his partner Hale, who has a crisis of conscience and attempts to betray the conspiracy in the episode "End of the Tunnel". It marks the first time in the series that the character shows true remorse and complexity. He is visibly upset that Hale planned to name him as a co-conspirator, giving Kellerman incentive enough to murder his old friend and partner.

The second part of the season often finds Kellerman at odds with Samantha Brinker, the Company intermediary to Reynolds. Discovering that The Company had ulterior motives for the framing of Burrows, Kellerman shows his first hint of disillusionment and he demands that Reynolds reassures him that he is working for her and not for The Company. Episodes such as "Brother's Keeper", and "J-Cat" also explores his ever more obvious affection towards Reynolds, revealing that he has served her loyally for 15 years. He is very familiar with Caroline Reynolds and seems to genuinely care about her and supports her, especially after The Company threatens her in the episode "Tonight". In the final episode of the season, Kellerman helps her assassinate the sitting president, and is by her side as she is being sworn into office.

=== Season 2 ===
Kellerman's role is larger in the second season. His first appearance is in the episode "Scan". Instead of directly involving himself in the manhunt for the "Fox River Eight", Kellerman decides to track Sara Tancredi (Sarah Wayne Callies), who he thinks will lead him to Michael Scofield (Wentworth Miller) and Lincoln Burrows. The next two episodes follow Kellerman as he attempts to befriend Sara, identifying himself as a drug addict named "Lance". He remains ruthless and loyal to the conspiracy at the start of the season, manipulating Sara into trusting him. After being disallowed from contacting President Reynolds in the sixth episode, instead being forced to report to Company operative Mr. Kim, Kellerman confirms his growing fear that Reynolds is no more than a pawn of The Company. He begins to grow disillusioned with his cause and bitter and resentful towards Reynolds for deceiving him. In the next several episodes, Kellerman clashes with Kim; he begins to protest against the taking of innocent peoples' lives, to which Kim is indifferent. Kellerman continues to follow Kim's orders, and puts pressure on the leader of the FBI manhunt, Special Agent Alexander Mahone, who is under blackmail from The Company, to secretly ensure the deaths of all the fugitives. As his character arc unfolds, Kellerman becomes increasingly uncertain of his continued allegiance to the conspiracy.

In "Bolshoi Booze", he tortures a captured Sara for any information her father might have given her, and is then told by Kim to kill her. At this point, his growing doubts causes him to falter and he has a crisis of conscience. Kellerman does however reluctantly attempt to kill her, but she manages to escape. His failure prompts Kim to authorize a total disavowal of Kellerman and erasure of all records pertaining to him. The rest of the season follows Kellerman as a rogue agent. In the episode "The Killing Box", he supposedly engineers a trap for Michael and Lincoln to be allowed back into the conspiracy. His true motives are revealed when Kellerman instead allies himself with the brothers in hopes of seeking revenge on the President and The Company. With Kellerman's help, they manage to find and capture Terrence Steadman. While keeping Steadman hostage, Kellerman has to endure humiliation as Steadman reveals to Michael and Lincoln that Kellerman not only harbored romantic feelings for Reynolds but proposed to her as well, only to be rejected. Kellerman continues to serve as an ally to the protagonists in the following episodes, helping them to broadcast a message to the country in "The Message", though a minor plot point includes him contemplating betrayal when he is apparently contacted by the President at the end of the episode. In the next episode, however, Kellerman eventually discovers that the woman is an imposter working for Mr. Kim.

Following these events, Kellerman grows increasingly bitter. After he helps to obtain an audio file that could exonerate Lincoln in the episode "Bad Blood", Kellerman is abandoned by Sara and the brothers and instead decides to seek revenge on his own terms. He obtains a sniper rifle in "Wash" and attempts to kill President Reynolds, but is unsuccessful. His character comes full circle when his suicide attempt fails and he calls his long estranged sister Kristine in the episode "Fin Del Camino". Realizing that he did terrible things for nothing and that he has dedicated his life to a lie, a genuinely remorseful Kellerman breaks down in tears while his sister comforts him. She convinces him to repent for his crimes, prompting him to come forward at Sara's trial. Kellerman's testimony exonerates Sara and Lincoln, but he is himself arrested. In his final appearance of the season and his last appearance on the show as a regular cast member, Kellerman is seemingly killed by Company operatives. Two masked gunmen open the doors of his transport van, and Kellerman looks at them and tells them "Took you long enough." He smiles as the masked gunmen shoot into the van, though the shooting occurs offscreen and his final fate is left open at the end of the season.

=== Season 4 ===
Paul Adelstein resumes his role as Kellerman for the series finale. Kellerman is revealed to be alive, having been freed by people working for Aldo Burrows. Now fully changed, the character plays a critical role in the episode, providing crucial help to bring down The Company. In the series epilogue set four years later, Kellerman is shown to have become a popular Congressman who is running for president. As a reminder of his past, however, the widow of his former partner Hale approaches him and spits in his face, after which he looks remorseful for his past deeds.

=== Season 5 ===
In the second episode of Season 5, Kellerman is shown to be working for the US State Department as a director. Sara goes to the State Department to report Michael as a US citizen missing after Lincoln sends her a video proving that Michael is still alive and incarcerated in Yemen. Kellerman offers assistance with enlightening Sara as to Michael's whereabouts over the past 7 years, and explains that someone is trying to erase Michael from history. Later in Season 5, Sara believes Kellerman to be the one pulling the strings as Poseidon, and enlists T-Bag to obtain information from him. Kellerman is shown talking on the phone to his ex-wife, discussing custody of his daughter, when Bagwell breaks into his home and holds him at gunpoint. Kellerman explains that he is not in fact Poseidon, but due to his history working in the government, is familiar with him. During the interrogation, Kellerman is shot in his chest through a window, and Bagwell flees. The gunman and Kellerman have a brief interaction, culminating in Kellerman being shot off-screen.

== Characteristics ==
Throughout the series Kellerman is depicted as someone who believes what he is doing is for the good of the country. In one of the first-season episodes he remarks to then-Vice President Reynolds that everything he has done has been for her, her family and most importantly this country. He plays both the villain and the ally in the series and portrays characteristics of both parts. Although perceived to be a cold-blooded killer, he loves his sister very much, and shows reluctance to carry out Mr. Kim's operations. Furthermore, according to Paul Adelstein, who portrays Paul Kellerman, the character's moral compass told him that Reynolds was the best leader for the country, and that anything or anyone who jeopardizes her position must be eliminated, "He is a patriot, if a misguided one. If a few people have to die to ensure her status, so be it."

There is a clear difference to his portrayal throughout the series. In the first season, Kellerman was not only a cold-blooded murderer but also consistently cruel. The best example of this is in the episode Tweener where Kellerman, after having assisted in the murder of L.J. Burrows' mother, taunts the boy about his mom's death.

In the second season, however, Kellerman is portrayed as more human. He starts to object to the taking of innocent people's lives, and shows genuine remorse when he is ordered to kill Sara Tancredi. We are also introduced to his sister, whom Kellerman clearly loves very much.

In the fourth season, he returns as a Congressman of great influence, well loved by the press and seemingly fighting corruption in the government, almost being completely the opposite of where he started out in the series. He eventually becomes the key person to exonerate every member of Donald Self's team, except for T-Bag. He is here shown to be honest and charismatic, though somewhat distant and reserved towards the other protagonists.

== Conceptual history ==
=== Concept and creation ===
The character was initially conceived to be a merely stereotypical villain. Show creator Paul Scheuring comments that the complexity Adelstein has added to Kellerman's character has convinced the writers to make the character more of a regular and a fulcrum of the second season's second half. Paul Adelstein initially auditioned for the role of Lincoln Burrows. Scheuring said the Burrows character needed to possess heart and yet be a physically imposing presence in prison. Adelstein portrayed a vulnerability that sufficiently impressed the directors to hire Adelstein for the role of Kellerman.

=== The fate of Kellerman ===
Before the season two finale aired, Adelstein said in a TV Guide article that, "There's a cliff-hanger to Kellerman's story line in the finale, and I think there will be some passionate discussion about exactly what happened. It's not really ambiguous, but it's still open to various interpretations."

According to issue #4 of the Official Prison Break Magazine, writer and co-producer Karyn Usher discussed Paul Kellerman. When asked about his fate, she replied "...this is Prison Break, and I wouldn't be surprised if Kellerman appeared again."

An easter egg on the Season Two DVD release, in part a slideshow of all the characters that had been killed on the show, did not include Kellerman.

Nick Santora said in an interview that he can't reveal anything about Kellerman's current state and possible comeback: "That's not how it works. It's not up to Paul Adelstein… He is under contract to a show, they own his services. As for confirming his death, I cannot confirm or deny that. Sorry but I am not allowed to do that, could cost me my job."

The final episode of Season 4 reveals that Kellerman was not killed. However, the character was ultimately killed off during the fourth episode of season 5.
